= Kadhalil Sodhappuvadhu Yeppadi (soundtrack) =

Soundtrack album by Thaman S
- Released: 27 January 2012
- Recorded: 2011–2012
- Genre: Feature film soundtrack
- Length: 17:04
- Language: Tamil
- Label: Think Music
- Producer: Thaman S

Thaman S chronology
Nippu (2012)	Kadhalil Sodhappuvadhu Yeppadi (2012)	Ishtam (2012)

Kadhalil Sodhappuvadhu Yeppadi is the soundtrack album to the 2012 film of the same name directed by Balaji Mohan and starring Siddharth and Amala Paul. The film's musical score is composed by Thaman S and featured six tracks with lyrics written by Madhan Karky and one song written by Mohan himself. The Telugu version Love Failure featured lyrics written by Sri Mani. The soundtrack for both Tamil and Telugu versions were distributed under the Think Music label and released on 27 January 2012.

== Development ==
The soundtrack and background score were composed by Thaman S, who previously acted with Siddharth in Boys (2003). Siddharth recorded two songs for the film, in his second stint as a playback singer in Tamil, after previously singing "Adada Adada" for Santosh Subramaniam (2008). Siddharth described the music to be "quirky, but catchy nevertheless" and goes with the mood of the film. Balaji Mohan himself wrote the lyrics of the song "Ananda Jaladosam", while the rest of the songs were written by Madhan Karky. Sri Mani wrote all lyrics in the Telugu version.

== Release ==
The soundtrack was launched at Sathyam Cinemas in Chennai on 27 January 2012, with the cast and crew, alongside Ravi Mohan and Shiva in attendance. The audio for the Telugu version was launched the same day at Prasads IMAX in Hyderabad.

== Track listing ==
=== Tamil ===
Kadhalil Sodhappuvadhu Yeppadi
No.	Title	Lyrics	Singer(s)	Length
1.	"Parvathi Parvathi"	Madhan Karky	Siddharth	3:25
2.	"Azhaipaya Azhaipaya"	Madhan Karky	Karthik, Harini	4:16
3.	"Ananda Jaladosam"	Balaji Mohan	Siddharth	2:08
4.	"Thavarugal Unargirom"	Madhan Karky	Thaman S	3:05
5.	"Azhaipaya Azhaipaya" (Reprise)	Madhan Karky	Karthik	4:14
Total length:				17:08

=== Telugu ===
All lyrics are written by Sri Mani.

Love Failure
No.	Title	Singer(s)	Length
1.	"Parvathi Parvathi"	Siddharth	3:25
2.	"Inthajarae"	Karthik, Suchitra	4:16
3.	"Happy Heart Attack"	Siddharth	2:08
4.	"Melukora Melukora"	Thaman S	3:05
5.	"Inthajare" (Reprise)	Karthik	4:14
Total length:			17:03

== Reception ==
Karthik Srinivasan of Milliblog commented it as "charming music from Thaman". The New Indian Express critic wrote "Thaman's songs peppy, and youthful are well placed." N. Venkateswaran of The Times of India stated "'Parvathi, Parvathi' (Siddharth) is a catchy number scored by Thaman, the other one being 'Azhaipaya' (Karthik and Harini)." Karthik Subramanian of The Hindu wrote "Thaman's music is adequate when it comes to songs, but he excels when it comes to the BGM." Sify wrote "Thaman's music enhances the story telling". For the Telugu version, Jeevi of Idlebrain.com stated "Thaman comes up with refreshing songs and a soothing background music."
