= Radiance Media Group =

Indian film production company

- Company type: Private
- Industry: Film production
- Founded: 2013
- Headquarters: Chennai, India
- Area served: India, International
- Key people: Varun Manian (Managing Director)

Radiance Media Group is an Indian film production company led by filmmaker and entrepreneur Varun Manian. Based in Chennai, Radiance Media makes films for audiences in India as well as international markets.

== History ==
Radiance Media is led by Manian who serves as Managing Director, and established the company in 2013. He earned a bachelor's degree in business at New York University in New York City.

Tamil films will be part of Radiance's portfolio.

== Films ==
In 2013, Radiance Media announced its first film project, the upcoming Tamil romantic comedy film, Vaayai Moodi Pesavum (Samassaram Aarogyathinu Haanikaram), directed by Balaji Mohan, and starring Dulquer Salman and Nazriya Nazim in the lead roles, appearing together in their third film. Nazim plays a doctor, and Salman plays a guy who loves to talk. The story focuses on the importance of communicating right, as Salman said, "... what is lost in translation, what happens with speaking too much or not speaking at all..." Filmed in Munnar and Chennai, the movie will feature music by Sean Roldan, and is slated to open in summer 2014. Filmed in both Tamil and Malayalam languages to reach a larger audience, both versions of the film will be launched simultaneously. This will be the first of five films that Radiance will co-produce, working with S. Sashikanth.

Radiance and Saskikanth also are co-producing Kaaviya Thalaivan, a fictional Tamil historic movie directed by Vasanthabalan. Set in the 1930s, the movie will feature Prithviraj Sukumaran, Siddharth and Vedhika, and will tell a story about a group of theatre actors. Oscar Award-winner AR Rahman is composing the music.

Manian is co-producing with director Selvaraghavan a yet unnamed Tamil movie featuring actors Simbu and Trisha Krishnan in the lead roles. Yuvan Shankar Raja will produce the music. Film production will start in February 2014, and it is slated for a mid-2014 release.

== Filmography ==
Year	Film	Director	Cast	Notes
2013	Vaayai Moodi Pesavum	Balaji Mohan	Dulquer Salman, Nazriya Nazim	Music by composer Sean Roldan
2014	Kaaviya Thalaivan	Vasanthabalan	Prithviraj Sukumaran, Siddharth, Vedhika	Music by composer AR Rahman
