= As I'm Suffering From Kadhal =

2017 Indian TV series

- Genre: Romantic comedy
- Created by: Balaji Mohan
- Written by: Balaji Mohan
- Directed by: Balaji Mohan
- Starring: Sunder Ramu; Balaji Mohan; Dhanya Balakrishna; Baby Yuvina; Nakshathra Nagesh; Sananth; Abishek Joseph George; Sanchana Natarajan
- Composer: Satish Raghunathan
- Original language: Tamil
- No. of seasons: 1
- No. of episodes: 10

Production
- Executive producers: Dhanya Balakrishna; Balaji Mohan
- Cinematography: Shiva GRN
- Editors: Prasanna GK; Balaji Mohan
- Running time: 20–27 minutes
- Production companies: Trendloud; Open Window Productions

Original release
- Network: Hotstar
- Release: 16 June 2017

As I'm Suffering from Kadhal (transl. As I'm suffering from love) is a 2017 Indian Tamil-language romantic comedy television series created, directed and written by Balaji Mohan. Set in urban Chennai, it narrates the story of three uniquely different young couples and a young divorced father and his 8-year-old daughter, and their quirky take on the varied aspects of modern-day love. The principal characters of the series include Sunder Ramu, Yuvina Parthavi, Sananth, Sanchana Natarajan, Dhanya Balakrishna, Balaji Mohan, Nakshathra Nagesh and Abhishek Joseph George. The ten-episode series was released on 16 June 2017 on Hotstar, and opened to positive reception from audiences. The series was renewed for a second season.

== Plot ==
The show revolves around the lives of Bala Kumar, a divorcee who shares the custody of his daughter Smriti; Divya and Badri, a live-in couple, who completely oppose the fact of getting married; Meera and Santhosh, a married couple, who absolutely hate each other; Raghav and Tanvi, who are in the process of getting married.

The series starts with Meera crashing her car and ruining Tanvi-Raghav's Pre-pre-engagement party. Divya then tells Raghav to check on Meera, and it is later discovered that Meera cheated on Santhosh with Raghav as Santhosh too cheated on her at his Bachelor party with a girl called Nii-vaa-suin in Bangkok. Badri hears their conversation and struggles to hide the truth. He eventually tells it to Divya.

At Raghav and Tanvi's pre-engagement party, Meera learns that she is pregnant. She throws the pregnancy-kit in the dustbin that is later seen by Divya. Santhosh and his friend add alcohol to Divya & Badri's juice. A drunk Divya and Badri blurt out the truth in front of everybody and even confess to Divya's dad that they don't want to get married.

Tanvi breaks up with Raghav. Meera tells Santhosh that she is pregnant with his baby and they both reconcile. Divya's dad warns Badri to marry Divya. Bala Kumar gets extremely sad and upset because his ex-wife shifts with Smriti and her husband to Bangalore. This story ends with a lot of confusion and happiness.

== Cast ==
=== Main cast ===
- Sunder Ramu as Bala Kumar
- Yuvina Parthavi as Smrithi
- Sananth as Badri
- Sanchana Natarajan as Divya
- Dhanya Balakrishna as Meera
- Balaji Mohan as Santosh
- Nakshathra Nagesh as Tanvi
- Abhishek Joseph George as Raghav

=== Guest appearance ===
- RJ Love Guru (Vivaswan Rajesh) voiced as an Interviewer
- Arjunan as Balaji Mohan friend
- Robo Shankar as associate director
- Andrea Jeremiah as psychiatrist
- RJ Vigneshkanth as a photographer
- Vaidhyanathan as Divya's father
- Radha Shekar as Divya's mother
- Vijay Varadharajan as producer
- Vignesh Vijayakumar as assistant director
- VJ Ramya as Sara, Divya's friend

== Episodes ==
No.	Title	Directed by	Written by	Original release date
1	"Meet the Sufferers"	Balaji Mohan	Balaji Mohan	16 June 2017
2	"Suffering for Chaos"	Balaji Mohan	Balaji Mohan	16 June 2017
3	"Suffering from Chronic Fighting"	Balaji Mohan	Balaji Mohan	16 June 2017
4	"Suffering from Perfection Deficiency"	Balaji Mohan	Balaji Mohan	16 June 2017
5	"Suffering from External Problem"	Balaji Mohan	Balaji Mohan	16 June 2017
6	"Suffering from High Expectations"	Balaji Mohan	Balaji Mohan	16 June 2017
7	"Suffering From Pressure To Perform"	Balaji Mohan	Balaji Mohan	16 June 2017
8	"Suffering From Dependency"	Balaji Mohan	Balaji Mohan	16 June 2017
9	"Suffering From A Secret Overdose"	Balaji Mohan	Balaji Mohan	16 June 2017
10	"Suffering From Kadhal"	Balaji Mohan	Balaji Mohan	16 June 2017

== Production ==
In our scenario, in Tamil films or south Indian films for that matter, a large side of reality is not shown. It's mostly about two people meeting and how they fall in love. I'm more interested in what happens after the relationship starts [...] There's so much potential and content there which I feel we haven't explored. I thought it's high time we did it...and a platform like this offers me the space to say what I believe in and a lot of people are happy to see their life being shown on screen.

— Balaji Mohan on the narrative of As I'm Suffering From Kadhal

Balaji Mohan initially planned As I'm Suffering from Kadhal as a feature film, but ultimately decided it was better made as a series, saying, "as I explored the concept further with parallel storylines falling into place, it didn't make sense to fit it into a two-hour film". He added that the decision to make it a series was mostly due to the advice of Dhanush and Soundarya Rajinikanth, before he began work on Maari 2. Balaji also stated that the series is a more mature and deeper version of Kadhalil Sodhappuvadhu Yeppadi (2012), his feature film debut.

Balaji opined that the moral compass of the characters in the series is different from feature films, stating, "The whole audience that watches a feature film won't watch this web series [sic]. The people watching this series are also people who watch films... but I'm not targeting this for the whole of Tamil Nadu or all age groups. This is for people who've seen all this happening around them, and they understand that this is what happens today." He also said that making it a series ensured significant freedom, due to less restrictions and censoring when compared to feature films.

The digital distribution of the series' rights were sold to Hotstar, which was owned and operated by Star India. Balaji produced the film under his Open Window banner and Trendloud, an original content studio tied up with the platform as his creative team ensured the creative freedom needed to create the show as he had envisioned.

== Soundtrack ==
The team released a song teaser in Hotstar composed by Satish Raghunathan on 31 May 2017, followed by the music video and the single on 2 June 2017. The lyrics for the song was penned by Balaji Mohan and sung by Anand Aravindakshan, Balaji Mohan, Dhanya Balakrishna, Karthika Vaidyanathan, Satish Raghunathan and choreographed by Gayathri Raguram.

== Release ==
As I'm Suffering from Kadhal was the first ever Indian series for Hotstar Originals. All the ten episodes of the series were released simultaneously on Hotstar on 16 June 2017. The series opened to positive reception from audience and followed by the response, the makers renewed for a second season during the time of release. Balaji Mohan said that he had finished writing of the second season and ensured that the series will progress soon.

== Critical reception ==
Sujatha Narayanan of Firstpost wrote "The story of As I'm Suffering From Kadhal is bold with a capital B – without harming value systems or taking sides or passing judgement." Sruthi Raman of The Times of India assigned a score 3.5 (out of 5) and wrote "The show loses steam towards the end, culminating in a played-out revelation. But the characters seem to stay with us till the end." Vikram Venkateshwaran of The Quint wrote "As I’m Suffering From Kadhal is a refreshing rom-com that anyone living in a metro city can relate to. It comes with subtitles, so even if you don't speak Tamil or Telugu, you might enjoy it."
