= Sunder Ramu =

Indian film and stage actor

- Born: Sunder Ramu; 27 June 1973 (age 53); Chennai, Tamil Nadu, India
- Occupations: Actor, photographer
- Years active: 2011–present
- Relatives: Jaggesh (brother-in-law)

Sunder Ramu (born 27 June 1973) is an Indian photographer and actor, who works predominantly in Tamil-language films and English plays. He is best known for appearing in the Dhanush-starrers Mayakkam Enna (2011) and 3 (2012).

== Career ==
After completing his secondary education at The Valley School, Bengaluru, Sunder went to and consequently dropped out of the National School of Drama in Delhi halfway because he could not cope with Hindi. He returned to Chennai to join the Visual Communication course at Loyola College and happened to shoot a portfolio for model Sunita Punjabi who reached the semi-finals of the Femina Miss India competition. This began a career in fashion photography and he has since gone on to work for several different brands. He juggled this with a career as a stage actor, featuring in pantomimes for The Little Theatre for over 10 years. Since the early 1990s, Sunder has acted in about 600 shows with 12 different groups.

Sunder then collaborated with actor and friend Dhanush in acting with him in short films, one of which Selvaraghavan took over and turned into Mayakkam Enna. Sunder played a key role in the film alongside Dhanush and Richa Gangopadhyay, and the film released in November 2011 to critical acclaim with a critic from The Hindu mentioning that "Sundar was impressive". In 3, Sunder played Dhanush's friend and also was as a part of the popular Why This Kolaveri Di song. He co-starred with his childhood friend Udhayanidhi Stalin in Idhu Kathirvelan Kadhal. Then he featured in Balaji Mohan's web series As I'm Suffering From Kadhal as one of the leads. He transitioned to Malayalam films before taking a hiatus from acting.

In 2015, he planned to go on a date every day of the year and donated the money he saved during meals to local charities in order to raise awareness about women's rights. He said the Delhi gang rape case was the breaking point for him. Due to the Chennai floods, he stopped 30 dates short of his goal.

== Filmography ==
- Note: all films are in Tamil, unless otherwise noted.

Year	Film	Role	Notes
2011	Mayakkam Enna	Sundar	Nominated, Filmfare Award for Best Supporting Actor – Tamil
2012	3	Senthil	
2013	David	The Man who stabs the politician	Guest appearance
2014	Idhu Kathirvelan Kadhal	Gautham	
2014	Naan Sigappu Manithan	Karuna	
2016	Kanithan	Senthil	
2019	Love Action Drama	Venkit	Malayalam film
2021	Saajan Bakery Since 1962	Michel	Malayalam film
2021	Sivaranjiniyum Innum Sila Pengalum	Mani	

=== Television ===
Year	Title	Role	Platform	Notes
2017	As I'm Suffering From Kadhal	Bala Kumar	Hotstar	
