= Vijay Award for Best Costume Designer =

Indian film award

The Vijay Award for Best Costume Designer is given by Star Vijay as part of its annual Vijay Awards ceremony for Tamil (Kollywood) films.

== The list ==
Here is a list of the award winners and the films for which they won.

Year	Costume Designer	Film	Link
2014	Perumal and Niranjani Ahathian	Kaaviya Thalaivan	
2013	Poornima Ramaswamy	Paradesi	
2012	S Rajendran	Aravaan	
2011	Anu Vardhan, Moorthy	7aam Arivu	
2010	Deepali Noor	Madrasapattinam	
2009	Anu Vardhan	Sarvam	
2008	Gouthami Tadimalla	Dasavathaaram	
2007	Anu Vardhan	Billa	
2006			

== Nominations ==
- 2008 Gouthami Tadimalla - Dasavathaaram
  - Moorthy - Santosh Subramaniam
  - Nalini Sriram - Vaaranam Aayiram
  - Natarajan - Subramaniyapuram
- 2009 Anu Vardhan - Sarvam
  - Chaitanya and Sai - Kanthaswamy
  - Moorthy - Naan Kadavul
  - Nalini Sriram - Ayan
  - Sai Babu - Kanchivaram
- 2010 Deepali Noor - Madrasapattinam
  - Erum Ali - Aayirathil Oruvan
  - Nalini Sriram - Vinnaithaandi Varuvaayaa
  - Manish Malhotra - Enthiran
  - Sai - Irumbukkottai Murattu Singam
- 2011 Anu Vardhan & Moorthy - 7 Aum Arivu
  - Nalini Sriram - Engeyum Kadhal
  - Swetha Srinivas - Ko
  - Natarajan - Vaagai Sooda Vaa
  - Vasuki Bhaskar - Mankatha
- 2012 S. Rajendran - Aravaan
  - Gabreilla Wilkins - Mugamoodi
  - Ganesh - Kumki
  - Kunal Rawal, Deepali Noor, Sai - Nanban
  - Vinesh Arora, Sarin - Podaa Podi
- 2013 Perumal Selvam & Poornima Ramaswamy - Paradesi
  - Chaitanya Rao, Deepali Noor, Kaviza Raebhela & Sathya - Raja Rani
  - Chaitanya Rao, Nikhila Sukumar & Malinipriya - Endrendrum Punnagai
  - Deepali Noor - Irandam Ulagam
  - Gautami - Vishwaroopam
- 2014 Perumal & Niranjani Agathiyan - Kaaviya Thalaivan
  - Deepali Noor - Kaththi
  - James - Mundasupatti
  - Nikhaar Dhawan - Lingaa
  - Sathya NJ, Vasuki Bhaskar & Moorthy - Maan Karate

== See also ==
- Tamil cinema
- Cinema of India
