= Hulchul =

Hulchul (lit. 'commotion') may refer to these Indian films:

- Hulchul (1951 film), a Hindi film
- Hulchul (1971 film), a Bollywood thriller film
- Hulchul (1995 film), a Hindi action film
- Hulchul (2004 film), a Hindi-language romantic comedy-drama film
- Hulchul (2019 film), a Telugu-language film
