= Arjunan (actor) =

Indian actor (born 1986)

- Born: Arjunan Nandakumar; 8 August 1986 (age 40); Madras, Tamil Nadu, India
- Occupation: Actor
- Years active: 2011–present
- Spouse: Gayathri
- Children: 3

Arjunan is an Indian actor known for his supporting roles in predominantly Tamil-language films. He made a breakthrough as Siva, a hopeless romantic college student, in Balaji Mohan's bilingual film, Kadhalil Sodhappuvadhu Yeppadi (2012), receiving critical acclaim for his portrayal.

== Career ==
Arjunan made his breakthrough with Balaji Mohan's romantic comedy Kadhalil Sodhappuvadhu Yeppadi portraying Siddharth's friend, a hopeless romantic. The film, a remake of a short film by the director, which Arjunan also featured in saw him double up duty as an assistant director. A critic from The Hindu noted "despite appearing gawky and untrained as an actors", he "makes that up by being natural and uninhibited." After winning good reviews, he went on to feature in Siddharth's next Telugu film Jabardasth (2013) and then played a supporting role in Suseendran's Aadhalal Kadhal Seiveer (2013), where a critic praised his contribution, writing he "ensures some laughs even in the most serious scenes." Arjunan next played a supporting role in Balaji Mohans's following bilingual film, Vaayai Moodi Pesavum (2014).

== Personal life ==
Arjunan has twin children: son Ilan and daughter Iyal, both of whom are child actors. His third child was born in December 2023.

== Filmography ==
- All films are in Tamil, unless otherwise noted.

Year	Film	Role	Notes
2011	Uyarthiru 420	Doctor	
2012	Kadhalil Sodhappuvadhu Yeppadi	Siva	
2013	Jabardasth	Bairraju's friend	Telugu film
2013	Oruvar Meethu Iruvar Sainthu		
2013	Aadhalal Kadhal Seiveer	Jai	
2014	Bramman	Lakshmi's ex-lover	
2014	Samsaaram Aarogyathinu Haanikaram	Sathish	Malayalam film
2014	Vaayai Moodi Pesavum	Sathish	
2014	Arima Nambi	Raj	
2014	Yaan	Siva	
2014	Kappal	Kalyanasundaram	
2016	Aviyal	Dosa	Acted in segment Kanneer Anjali
2016	Aagam	Sai's friend	
2016	Darling 2	Shankar	
2016	Oyee	Krish's Uncle	
2016	Idhu Namma Aalu	Shiva's friend	
2016	Nambiar	Arjun	
2016	Meendum Oru Kadhal Kadhai	Abu	
2016	Kadavul Irukaan Kumaru		
2017	Senjittale En Kadhala		
2017	Bongu	Bhaskar	
2017	Vanamagan	Arjun	
2017	Ivan Yarendru Therikiratha	Arivu's friend	
2017	Puriyaadha Pudhir	DJ	
2017	Nenjil Thunivirundhal	Janani's lover	
2017	C/o Surya	Janani's lover	Telugu film
2018	Tik Tik Tik	Appu	
2019	Bodhai Yeri Budhi Maari	Joy	
2021	Chakra	Hacker	
2021	Gaadi Ulla Body		
2022	Oke Oka Jeevitham	Santhosh	Telugu film
2022	Kanam	Santhosh	
2022	O2		
2022	Nitham Oru Vaanam	Shiva	
2022	Oh My Ghost	Pushpa	
2023	Theerkadarishi		
2023	Uyir Thamizhukku	Admin	
2024	Emakku Thozhil Romance	Prashanth	
2025	Ring Ring	Sundar	
2025	Dinasari	Arjun	
2025	Yaman Kattalai		
2026	Carmeni Selvam	Female Rideshare passenger's boyfriend	

=== Television series ===
Year	Series	Role	Notes
2017	As I'm Suffering From Kadhal	Santosh's friend	Hotstar
2022	Anantham	Ramany	

=== Short films ===
Title	Notes
Kadhalil Sodhappuvadhu Yeppadi	
Chronos	
