= Lucky Star (2013 film) =

- Theatrical Poster
- Directed by: Deepu Anthikkad
- Written by: Deepu Anthkkad
- Produced by: Milan Jaleel
- Starring: Jayaram; Mukesh; Rachana Narayanankutty; Pooja Ramachandran
- Cinematography: Vijay Ulaganath
- Edited by: V T Sreejith
- Music by: Ratheesh Vegha
- Production company: Galaxy Films
- Distributed by: Galaxy films
- Release date: 8 March 2013
- Country: India
- Language: Malayalam
- Budget: 2.6cr
- Box office: 12 cr

Lucky Star is a 2013 Malayalam comedy-drama film written and directed by Deepu Anthikkad in his directorial debut, and produced by Milan Jaleel under his banner Galaxy Films. The film stars Jayaram and Mukesh alongside Rachana Narayanankutty, who debuts in cinema. The film is about how a child brings a sea of change in the life of his surrogate parents. Lucky Star released on 8 March 2013.

== Cast ==
- Jayaram as Ranjith
- Mukesh as Dr. George Chitillapally
- Rachana Narayanankutty as Janaki
- Viroj Dasani as Lucky
- Pooja Ramachandran as Swapna
- Mamukoya as Pappan
- T. G. Ravi as Bhaskaran
- Ammu Ramachandran as Sumithra
- P. Sreekumar

== Reception ==
Oneindia gave the film 3 stars out of 5 and stated "the first half is extremely funny and entertaining, the second half gets a little serious" while Indiaglitz called it "A light-hearted entertainer that's an easy watch." A review in The Times of India gave the film 3.5 stars out of 5. Sify wrote "this film is not entirely bad and has its moments as well, but it could have been much better.” Rediff gave it 2.5 stars out of 5 and wrote "Lucky Star could have been a much better film if a little more thought had been given to how the film should progress in the second half."

== Soundtrack ==
The film's soundtrack contains 4 songs, all composed by Ratheesh Vegha. Lyrics by Rafeeq Ahamed and Arjun Vinod Varma (Ajju).

#	Title	Singer(s)
1	"Anchithal Poo Pookkum"	Haricharan
2	"Angry Birds"	Arjun Vinod Varma
3	"Kunjuvava Kayyil"	Thulasi Yatheendran
4	"Parayoo Njaanoru"	Sithara Krishnakumar, Deepu Anthikkadu
