= Idhu Kathirvelan Kadhal =

2014 Indian film by S. R. Prabhakaran

- Theatrical release poster
- Directed by: S. R. Prabhakaran
- Written by: S. R. Prabhakaran
- Produced by: Udhayanidhi Stalin
- Starring: Udhayanidhi Stalin; Nayanthara
- Cinematography: Balasubramaniem
- Edited by: Don Bosco
- Music by: Harris Jayaraj
- Production company: Red Giant Movies
- Distributed by: Red Giant Movies
- Release date: 14 February 2014
- Running time: 156 minutes
- Country: India
- Language: Tamil

Ithu Kathirvelan Kadhal (transl. This Is Kathirvelan's Love) is a 2014 Indian Tamil-language romantic comedy drama film written and directed by S. R. Prabhakaran, starring Udhayanidhi Stalin and Nayanthara. Santhanam, Sunder Ramu, Saranya Ponvannan and Chaya Singh play supporting roles. Produced by Udhayanidhi via Red Giant Movies, the film has cinematography by Balasubramaniem and editing by Don Bosco. Shot between February 2013 and January 2014, it was released on 14 February 2014.

== Plot ==
The film opens with a prologue, in which a person is being taken to a hospital and the doctor later reporting that the person's condition will be known only after sometime. The scene then shifts a few months back, where we are introduced to Kathirvelan "Kathir", a Madurai-based minibus owner who is a devout Hindu and devotee of Lord Anjaneya since the age of five. Due to his devotion for Lord Maruti, he does not show any interest in women.

One day, while returning from a Sri Anjaneya temple, he sees his elder sister, Vineethra crying outside his house after his father refused to take her in, having disowned her for eloping with a Coimbatore-based mill owner Shanmugham against his wishes. Vineethra, however, now has issues with Shanmugham, as a result of which, she left him and returned to her father's house. On Kathir's cajoling, his father reluctantly accepts Vineethra into the house. Kathir then decides to find out what caused the standoff between Vineethra and Shanmugham and leaves for Coimbatore, lying to his father that he is headed for Salem to do some work related to his minibus business. Before leaving, he is warned by Vineethra not to fall for Shanmugham's neighbour, Pavithra, as her father and Shanmugham are sworn enemies.

In Coimbatore, Kathir successfully resolves the conflict between Vineethra and Shanmugham, with Vineethra returning to Coimbatore eventually. He, however, does not return to Madurai immediately, staying back in Coimbatore after noticing Pavithra and falling in love with her, despite Vineethra's warning and his devotion to Lord Bajrangbali. Determined to win Pavithra's heart, he takes the help of his college friend Mayilvaganam aka Mayil, who is a medical doctor, finds out that Pavithra is working as a manager in a Panasonic showroom. The duo go there so that Kathir can speak to Pavithra, but end up creating a scene, forcing Pavithra to throw both of them out. After Pavithra notices Kathir constantly following her, she confronts him and threatens to take him to the police, which increases the friction between them. However, when Pavithra finds out how Kathir had saved Vineethra's marriage, she forgives him and becomes his friend, but later reveals that she is in love with a businessman, Gautham, which breaks Kathir's heart. To add to Kathir's woes, Shanmugham finds out that he is in love with Pavithra, and kicks him out of his house for showing interest in his enemy's daughter. Meanwhile, back in Madurai, his father too disowns him after finding out that he had not gone to Salem after all. Without a place to stay now, Kathir moves into Mayil's home.

Kathir soon finds out that Pavithra's boyfriend Gautham is a womaniser, planning to dump Pavithra after having a one-night stand with her at his friend's upcoming marriage in Ooty. He tells her about this, but she rubbishes his claims and admonishes him for still hitting on her. However, she soon realises the truth about Gautham after he attempts to kiss her in his car causing her to dump him. She and Kathir reconcile, but she now realises that she has feelings for Kathir. With the help of Mayil and Pavithra's Malayali friend, who Mayil has fallen in love with, they soon express their feelings for each other.

Trouble soon erupts however, after Shanmugham and Pavithra's father find out that Kathir and Pavithra are in love. Kathir and Pavithra decide that the only way Shanmugham and Pavithra's father can accept their relationship is to make them reconcile, as it is revealed by Shanmugham, that he and Pavithra's father are sworn enemies due to the enmity which existed between the latter and Shanmugham's deceased father, who happened to be Pavithra's paternal uncle. They take the help of a mimicry artist, Balaraman, who mimics both Shanmugham's and Pavithra's father's voices in the presence of the real Pavithra's father and Shanmugham respectively, which eventually leads to Shanmugham and Pavithra's father reconciling.

With the initial hurdle cleared, Kathir and Mayil then plan to convince Kathir's father, who has now reconciled with Kathir, but is also searching for a bride for him, to allow Kathir to marry Pavithra. However, while trying to tell Kathir's father about Pavithra, Mayil consumes poison and is immediately rushed to the hospital, which it is later revealed that Mayil pretended to poison himself by pretending to swallow laxatives, fearing the wrath of Kathir's father, and thereby revealing the identity of the person in the prologue. On returning home, Kathir tells his father about Pavithra, who, as expected, becomes furious and locks himself up in his room. Later, Kathir manages to calm down his father and adds that he will not marry Pavithra as long as he refuses to accept their relationship, whilst also saying that, unlike Vineethra, he does not want to marry without seeking his father's permission. On hearing of this, his father forgives Kathir, accepts his relationship with Pavithra and gives the go ahead signal for their marriage.

The film ends with Kathir and Pavithra getting married happily.

== Cast ==
- Udhayanidhi Stalin as Kathirvelan
- Nayanthara as Pavithra Mahalingam (Voice Dubbed by Savitha Reddy)
- Santhanam as Mayilvaganam
- Sunder Ramu as Gautham
- Chaya Singh as Vineethra Shanmugam (Voice Dubbed by Mahalakshmi)
- Dr. Bharath Reddy as Shanmugam
- Saranya Ponvannan as Yasothammal
- Aadukalam Naren as Kathirvelan's father
- Aadukalam Murugadoss as Kathirvelan's friend
- Jayaprakash as Mahalingam
- Vanitha Krishnachandran as Pavithra's mother
- Kala Kalyani as Pavithra's friend
- Mohana as Pavithra's friend
- Neethu Neelambaran as Vinotha
- Mayilsamy as Pala Kural Mannan Balaraman (cameo appearance)
- Swaminathan as a man in Hanuman getup (cameo appearance)

== Production ==
Filming for Idhu Kathirvelan Kadhal started on 22 February 2013 in Chennai. The film was also shot in Coimbatore, while a 10-day schedule was planned for filming two songs in European countries like Portugal, Spain and Switzerland. Filming wrapped in January 2014. Cinematography was handled by Balasubramaniem, and editing by Don Bosco.

== Soundtrack ==
The music was composed by Harris Jayaraj. The audio launch was held on 20 January 2014. Srinivasa Ramanujam of The Times of India rated the album 2.5 out of 5 stars. He felt the background music and tunes of "Maelae Maelae" were too similar to "Yele Keechan" from Kadal (2013), but singer Karthik "sound[s] his best in this foot-tapping song", that "Anbae Anbae" uses the "quintessential stock Harris musical phrase" as the composer did countless times, and "Sara Sara" too repeats the "same stock phrases", but appreciated the song's "delightful violin and neat instrumentation". Srinivasa Ramanujam criticised "Vizhaiyae Vizhiyae" for its "sedate and quite unadventurous musicality", and noted that "Palaakku" might satisfy the "front-benchers" and masses with its lyrics and "fast beats".

Track listing
No.	Title	Lyrics	Singer(s)	Length
1.	"Maelae Maelae"	Yugabharathi	Karthik	4:46
2.	"Anbae Anbae"	Thamarai	Harish Raghavendra, Harini	5:44
3.	"Sara Sara Saravedi"	Yugabharathi	KK, MK Balaji, Srilekha Parthasarathy, Raju Krishnamurthy	5:20
4.	"Vizhiyae Vizhiyae"	Thamarai	Aalap Raju	6:05
5.	"Palakku Devathaiya"	Yugabharathi	Jassie Gift, Velmurugan, Jayamoorthy	4:43
Total length:				25:65

== Release ==
Idhu Kathirvelan Kadhal was released on 14 February 2014, Valentine's Day. The film was distributed by Red Giant Movies in Tamil Nadu, and Fox Star Studios internationally. It was dubbed into Telugu as Seenugadi Love Story.

== Critical reception ==
Baradwaj Rangan wrote for The Hindu, "A few laughs, but overstuffed with subplots". Sify wrote, "the story is wafer-thin and weak and none of the characters are well-etched out. Every scene looks contrived and manipulated. This film doesn't work because it's hard to empathize with any of the characters and the actors fail to rise above the flawed script". Malini Mannath of The New Indian Express wrote, "Idhu Kathirvelan Kadhal may not be a great film. But it's a fairly decent family entertainer that wouldn't bore one".

M Suganth of The Times of India gave 3/5 and wrote, "The film isn't bad per se but displays very little ambition and is only mildly interesting". S. Saraswathi of Rediff.com gave 2.5/5 and wrote, "Idhu Kathirvelan Kadhal is a simple love story with a good mix of romance, comedy and sentiment. Though nothing extraordinary, the film makes a good Valentine's Day watch", calling it a "feel good entertainer". IANS gave 2/5 and concluded, "Idhu Kathirvelan Kadhal is a done to death rom-com that hardly entertains".
