= Pooja Ramachandran =

Indian actress, VJ and model

- Born: Bengaluru, Karnataka, India
- Occupations: Actress, VJ, model
- Years active: 2009–present
- Spouses: VJ Craig (m. 2010–2017) John Kokken (m. 2019)

Pooja Ramachandran is an Indian actress, VJ and model. After her studies, she participated in beauty pageants, winning the 'Miss Coimbatore 2004' title and was the runner up for Miss Kerala 2005. She then went on to become a VJ at SS Music before venturing into acting. She entered as a wild card contestant in the Telugu reality TV show Bigg Boss Telugu 2.

== Early life ==
Pooja Ramachandran is the daughter of an army officer. She did her schooling in Stanes Anglo Indian Higher Secondary School, Coimbatore and later studied visual communication at the CSI Bishop Appasamy College of Arts and Science in Coimbatore.

== Career ==
Pooja first featured in an advertisement when she was eight. Before the Miss Coimbatore title she had already done some assignments in Coimbatore and Bangalore. Pooja had also played a cameo in the Jayaram-Soundarya starrer Yathrakarude Sradhakku.

In February 2006, Pooja became a VJ at SS Music after she, along with Anuj Gurwara, Purnima Maudgil and Gibran, were selected as the winners out of 3000 contestants in SS Music's pan-India talent hunt show VJ Factor 2. She hosted shows like PCO, Gana Bajaana, Connect and Cinema Central. Later she hosted the show Ulagam Muzhuthum Paranthu Paranthu on Jaya TV. She was also a contestant in Anu Alavum Bayamillai becoming the winner of the first season, and acted in the thriller serial Kanchana, both on STAR Vijay.

After 2012, Pooja became a full-time actress, signing feature films across Tamil, Telugu and Malayalam industries. She was seen in minor roles in the romantic comedy Kadhalil Sodhappuvadhu Yeppadi, its Telugu version Love Failure and the thriller Pizza in 2012. The following year, she played supporting roles in the Telugu film Swamy Ra Ra and the Malayalam films Lucky Star and D Company. With regard to her performance in Swamy Ra Ra, Sify called her "perfect", Her first 2014 release, Adavi Kaachina Vennela, saw her playing a homemaker.

Pooja completed filming for the romantic drama Ore Nyabagam, which is reportedly India's first 2D high frame rate film. She is further more working on the suspense thriller Andhaghaaram, the horror-comedy Muni 3: Ganga, the romantic comedy Nanbenda and Swamy Ra Ra's Tamil remake Saamiyattam, while she also has been signed for two Telugu films.

She married VJ Craig in 2010 but divorced him in 2017.

== Personal life ==
She married actor John Kokken on 15 April 2019. She was earlier married to former SS Music VJ, Craig Gallyot.

== Filmography ==
Year	Title	Role	Language	Notes
2011	7am Arivu	Subha's Research Friend	Tamil	Debut film
2012	Kadhalil Sodhappuvadhu Yeppadi	Cathy	Tamil	
2012	Love Failure	Cathy	Telugu	Telugu debut; Bilingual film
2012	Nanban	Senthil's Wife	Tamil	Uncredited Role
2012	Pizza	Smitha	Tamil	
2013	Swamy Ra Ra	Bhanu	Telugu	
2013	Lucky Star	Swapna	Malayalam	
2013	D Company	Teena	Malayalam	
2014	Adavi Kaachina Vennela		Telugu	
2015	Nannbenda	Jenny	Tamil	
2015	Kanchana 2	Pooja	Tamil	
2015	Dohchay		Telugu	
2015	Tripura	Eesha	Telugu	
2015	Puriyadha Anandam Puthithaga Arambam	Amudha's friend	Tamil	
2015	Ore Nyabagam		Tamil	
2015	Saamiyattam		Tamil	
2016	Dalam		Telugu	
2016	Siddharta		Telugu	
2016	Black Coffee		Tamil	
2016	Marala Telupana Priya		Telugu	
2016	Kalam	Neela	Tamil	
2017	Devi Sri Prasad	Leela	Telugu	
2017	Koditta Idangalai Nirappuga	Cameo	Tamil	
2018	Inthalo Ennenni Vinthalo	Thara	Telugu	
2018	Krishnarjuna Yudham	Nikki	Telugu	
2018	Law	Ghost	Telugu	
2019	Venky Mama	Bride	Telugu	
2019	Tholu Bommalata	Bhavana	Telugu	
2020	Entha Manchivaadavuraa	Balu's friend	Telugu	
2020	Andhaghaaram	Pooja	Tamil	
2021	Power Play		Telugu	
2021	Ippudu Kaaka Inkeppudu		Telugu	
2022	Repeat		Telugu	
2022	Boyfriend for Hire	Natasha	Telugu	
2023	My Name Is Shruthi	Anu	Telugu	
2025	Hathya	Salima	Telugu	
2025	45		Kannada	

=== Television ===
Year	Title	Role	Network	Language	Notes
2014	3rd South Indian International Movie Awards	Host	Sun TV	Tamil	Co-hosted with Shiva
2023	The Village	Happy	Amazon Prime Video	Tamil	
