= Niranjani Ahathian =

Indian costume designer and fashion stylist

Niranjani Agathiyan
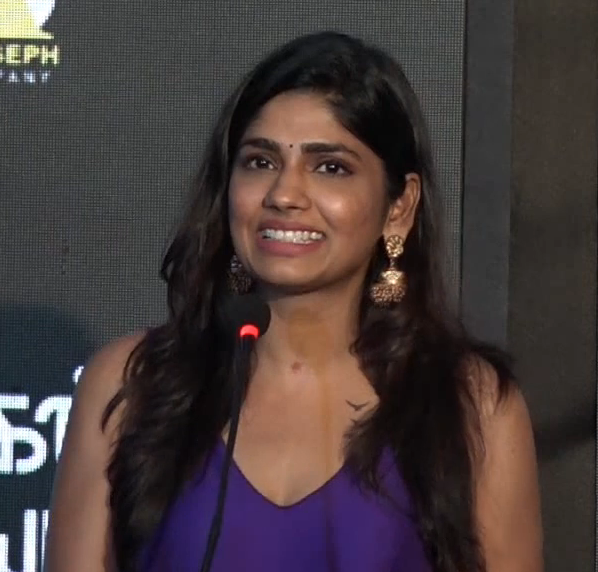
- Agathiyan at the premier of Kannum Kannum Kollaiyadithaal in 2020
- Born: Chennai, Tamil Nadu, India
- Occupations: Actress, costume designer, fashion stylist
- Years active: 2014–present
- Spouse: Desingh Periyasamy
- Relatives: Kani Thiru (sister); Vijayalakshmi Ahathian (sister)

Niranjani Agathiyan is an Indian actress, costume designer and fashion stylist who works in the Tamil film industry. She is the daughter of film director Agathiyan.

== Career ==
After she gained experience working with Nalini Sriram, Agathiyan worked on Sigaram Thodu (2014), Kaaviya Thalaivan and Kabali (2016).

== Filmography ==
=== As costume designer ===
- Vaayai Moodi Pesavum (2014)
- Sigaram Thodu (2014)
- Kaaviya Thalaivan (2014)
- Trisha Illana Nayanthara (2015)
- Kathakali (2016)
- Pencil (2016)
- Kaballi (2016)
- Enakku Vaaitha Adimaigal (2017)
- Bairavaa (2017)
- Namma Veettu Pillai (2019)
- Kannum Kannum Kollaiyadithaal (2020)

=== As actress ===
- Kannum Kannum Kollaiyadithaal (2020) as Shreya/Varsha/Thenmozhi

== Awards ==
- Vijay Awards for Kaaviya Thalaivan
- Ananda Vikatan for Kabali
