= Hathya =

2025 Indian Telugu-language film by Srividya Basawa

- Theatrical release poster
- Directed by: Srividya Basawa
- Written by: Srividya Basawa
- Produced by: S Prashanth Reddy
- Starring: Dhanya Balakrishna; Ravi Varma; Pooja Ramachandran; Bindu Chandramouli; Srikanth Iyengar
- Cinematography: Abhiraj Rajendran Nair
- Edited by: Anil Kumar Pasala
- Music by: Naresh Kumaran P
- Production company: Mahaakaal Pictures
- Release date: 24 January 2025
- Running time: 148 minutes
- Country: India
- Language: Telugu

Hathya is a 2025 Indian Telugu-language political crime thriller film written and directed by Srividya Basawa. The film features Dhanya Balakrishna, Ravi Varma, Pooja Ramachandran, Bindu Chandramouli and Srikanth Iyengar in important roles.

The film was released on 24 January 2025.

== Plot ==
"Hathya" is a 2025 Telugu-language political crime thriller film written and directed by Srividya Basawa. The movie is loosely based on the real-life murder of YS Vivekananda Reddy, a popular politician in Andhra Pradesh.

The story revolves around the investigation of the murder of Dayananda Reddy (played by Ravi Varma), a powerful politician. The Chief Minister assigns a top cop, Sudha Rao (played by Dhanya Balakrishna), to uncover the truth behind the murder. As Sudha delves deeper into the case, she faces obstacles and uncovers a complex web of deceit.

== Cast ==
- Dhanya Balakrishna as Sudha Rao
- Ravi Varma as V. S. Dayananda Reddy (based on Y. S. Rajasekhara Reddy)
- Pooja Ramachandran as Shaheen
- Bindu Chandramouli as Anitha
- Srikanth Iyengar
- Raghunath Raju
- Sivaji Raja
- Bharath Reddy as V. S. Jeevan Reddy
- Jay Chandra
- Venkatesh Prasad as Sheik Das

== Release and reception ==
Hathya was released on 24 January 2025. It was released on Amazon Prime Video on 12 March 2025.

Sowmya Sangam of The Hans India wrote that "The performances, direction, and narrative structure make it a noteworthy addition to the genre". Avad Mohammad of OTTPlay gave a rating of 2.5 out of 5 and wrote, "Despite the lack of a strong supporting cast and a slightly prolonged narrative, the suspenseful storyline and engaging moments make it worth a watch".
