= Krishna Leela (2025 film) =

2025 Indian Telugu film by Devan

- Theatrical release poster
- Directed by: Devan
- Screenplay by: Devan
- Story by: Anil Kiran Kumar G
- Produced by: Jyothsna G
- Starring: Devan; Dhanya Balakrishna
- Cinematography: Satish Muthyala
- Edited by: Karthika Srinivas
- Music by: Bheems Ceciroleo
- Production company: Mahasen Visuals
- Release date: 7 November 2025
- Country: India
- Language: Telugu

Krishna Leela is a 2025 Indian Telugu-language supernatural film co-written and directed by Devan, who also plays the lead role alongside Dhanya Balakrishna.

The film was released on 7 November 2025.

== Plot ==
Vihari, a yoga expert, returns to India, where he meets Brundha and begins to uncover a connection between them that dates back to a previous life. As they investigate their shared past, they become entangled in a centuries-old curse that continues to affect their lives. Their relationship develops against the backdrop of reincarnation, fate and their attempts to overcome the forces that have kept them apart.

== Cast ==
- Devan as Vihari and Shiva
- Dhanya Balakrishna as Brundha and Dakshayani
- Tulasi
- Vinod Kumar
- Babloo Prithiveeraj
- Ravi Kale
- Sarayu Roy
- Anand Bharathi
- Gagan Vihari

== Music ==
The background score and songs are composed by Bheems Ceciroleo.

All lyrics are written by Bhaskarabhatla.

Track listing
No.	Title	Singer(s)	Length
1.	"Emo Emo"	Nakash Aziz	3:09
2.	"Asalenduke"	Yazin Nizar	2:58
3.	"Kadhalo Nuvvele Raja Kumari"	Javed Ali	3:20
4.	"Soori Ori Soori"	Jassie Gift	4:14
5.	"Kadhile Megham"	Sindhuja Srinivasan	2:22
Total length:			17:41

== Release and reception ==
Krishna Leela was film was released on 7 November 2025.

Bhanuprasad Rangaiahgari of News18 Telugu rated the film 2.75 out of 5 and appreciated lead performances. Ramu Chinthakindhi of Times Now Telugu too gave the same rating.
