= Kaaviya Thalaivan (2014 film) =

2014 Indian film by Vasanthabalan

- Theatrical release poster
- Directed by: G. Vasanthabalan
- Written by: B. Jeyamohan (dialogue)
- Screenplay by: G. Vasanthabalan; B. Jeyamohan
- Story by: G. Vasanthabalan
- Produced by: Varun Manian; S. Sashikanth
- Starring: Prithviraj Sukumaran; Siddharth; Vedhika; Anaika Soti
- Cinematography: Nirav Shah
- Edited by: Praveen K. L.
- Music by: A. R. Rahman
- Production companies: YNOT Studios; Radiance Media
- Distributed by: Dream Factory
- Release date: 28 November 2014
- Running time: 150 minutes
- Country: India
- Language: Tamil
- Budget: ₹20 crore (US$2.1 million)

Kaaviya Thalaivan (transl. Epic Hero) is a 2014 Indian Tamil-language historical drama film written and directed by Vasanthabalan and produced by S. Sashikanth and Varun Manian under their production companies YNOT Studios and Radiance Media Group. It stars Prithviraj Sukumaran and Siddharth in the lead roles along with Vedhika, Anaika Soti, Nassar, Thambi Ramaiah, Ponvannan, Mansoor Ali Khan and others in supporting roles. The film's music was composed by A. R. Rahman. Set in the early 20th century, the film is about the lives of two theatre artistes and the competition that exists between them in a small drama troupe.

The project was announced by YNOT Studios in September 2012, and principal photography of the film commenced in June 2013. The soundtrack and background score were composed by A. R. Rahman; while cinematography was handled by Nirav Shah and editing by Praveen K. L.. The costume designs were done by Perumal Selvam and Niranjani Ahathian, and Pattanam Rasheed was the make-up artist.

The film was released on 27 November 2014, and won positive reviews from critics. It received awards in four categories at the Tamil Nadu State Film Awards, including Best Actor (Siddharth), Best Villain (Prithviraj), Best Music Director (A. R. Rahman) and Best Make-up (Mohammed Rashid). At the 2015 Vijay Awards, the film was nominated into eight categories, with receiving a win in two of them – Best Costume Designer and Best Make Up. The film was dubbed into Malayalam as Pradhi Nayagan, which was released in 2014 and into Telugu as Premaalayam, which released in 2016.

== Plot ==
Thavathiru Sivadas Swamigal runs a drama troupe in which Thalaivankottai Kaliappa " Kali " Bhagavathar and Melachivilberi Gomathi Nayagam " Gomathi " Pillai are his direct disciples. Gomathi is left by his father in Swami's troupe. Kali is found by Swami during a train trip where the boy is singing and begging for alms. Impressed by his singing talents, Swami takes the boy with him. Gomathi and Kaliappa have a relationship like brothers. They grow up together and stage many plays where Gomathi often plays the "sthripart" (female role), and Kali plays the "sidepart" (supporting characters). Vadivambal joins as the female member of the group and soon falls in love with Kali. Meanwhile, Gomathi falls for Vadivu; however, Kali loves Rangamma, the princess of the zameen. S. V. Bhairava Sundaram, who is another student of Swami, is a popular "Rajapart" (performing main title characters of a stage play). He becomes headstrong over his acting capabilities and does not attend the rehearsals, for which he gets scoldings from Swami. After a quarrel, he leaves the troupe as he could not bear Swami's torture. Swami does not give up and conducts an audition for the main character role of Soorapadman, in which Kali and Gomathi perform. Kali gets selected, which leaves Gomathi angry. The reason behind Swami's bias towards Kali is never answered clearly by Gomathi, which leaves him more frustrated.

After following Kali secretly, Gomathi informs Swami about Kali's love to take revenge on him. Swami scolds Kali and curses him that he will never play any characters on stage, but Kali wants Swami to pardon him and keep him with the troupe as a servant. Swami agrees and asks him to forget the princess if he wants to continue in the troupe. Kali promises, but Swami agrees to keep him with the troupe like a servant but does not take back the curse. The following day, the entire troupe leaves the village and heads to another place. Kali cannot forget Rangamma, and she is also shown to be searching for Kali, and one night, a man from the village comes to Kali while he was sleeping to inform him that Rangamma has committed suicide due to the forcing of her parents to get married. The man also says that she was pregnant when she died. Kali, fully drunk, comes to the troupe and curses Swami that he is the reason for Rangamma's and his unborn child's death. Swami gets ill suddenly and dies, but before dying, he blesses Kali, who pardons to forgive him, which drives Gomathi into more anger and jealousy. After Swami's death, Gomathi takes charge of the troupe and wants Kali to be out of it. Kali fights with Gomathi and leaves.

It is shown that the troupe travels to Ceylon, Malaysia, and Singapore in five years' time and becomes popular. Now, Gomathi is a famous "Rajapart" as he wished to be, and Vadivu is known to be the famous "Ganakokilam" Vadivambal. They return to Madurai and join hands with a famous stage play producer named Contract Kannaiah, who produces the plays. When they are getting ready to stage the play "Karnamotcham", Gomathi falls severely ill. He asks the people from his troupe to go in search of other drama actors to perform his role. A man goes and brings Kali, who is a drunkard now. Feeling delighted to see his troupe members, he agrees to play the role of "Karnan", though he is given the role of "Arjuna" by Gomathi, who says that it has been long since they performed together. Gomathi performed well, but was surpassed by Kali as he sings a song and drives the attention of the audience to himself, Gomathi still feels ill and could not perform in any plays. Meanwhile, Kali fills the gap and earns a good reputation as "Rajapart", which makes Gomathi even more jealous. He knows the interest of Kali towards freedom movement stage plays and arranges for a person to get Kali arrested for performing in plays, which is against the British. Gomathi visits him in jail on the pretext of taking him on bail.

Inside the jail, Kali meets other people involved in the freedom movement and encouraged by them, he agrees to do stage plays on that topic. Meanwhile, Gomathi falls in love with Vadivu and pesters her to marry him. Meanwhile, her mother makes arrangements to make her the mistress of a Jamin king. Distressed Vadivu leaves the troupe and waits for a call from Kali to join his "Bharatha Gana Sabha", in which he stages plays based on the freedom movement, due to which he frequently goes to jail. Meanwhile, the audience becomes interested in Kali's plays rather than Gomathi's epic plays. Vadivu gets a call after so much persuasion for which she was waiting and joins there eagerly. She expresses her love, and it is lately accepted by Kali. Gomathi's life changes, and he turns from a rich man to a poor man. Kali is informed about Gomathi's situation. Therefore, he approaches Gomathi and asks him to join his troupe and offers him the "Rajapart" role with fondness, to which Gomathi agrees. They get ready to stage a play on Bhagat Singh, for which the British announce a shooting warrant. However, a brave Kali performs on stage, but when the play ends, the police come and chaos starts. The troupe people ask Gomathi, Kali, and Vadivu to escape. Police follow them, Kali goes alone, and Vadivu and Gomathi escape together inside a forest. A gun sound is heard, and Gomathi leaves back Vadivu to go and see what it was. He meets Kali, who is safe. Kali tells a plan to meet the next morning. While he leaves, he is shot by Gomathi.

Kali is shocked and asks why he did this to his brother. Gomathi vents out his anger for the first time to Kali saying that Kali snatched the "Rajapart" role of Soorapadman, his love interest Vadivu, regained his "Rajapart" status when he fell ill and states that he is now poor because of the increased popularity of Kali's plays. Kali says that he knows it was Gomathi who told Swami about his frequent visits to Rangamma's place, and he also says that he knows the person who made him sent to jail was Gomathi's arrangement, but he took all these as good deeds that his elder brother did for him for positive changes in his life and forgave Gomathi each and every time. Gomathi now feels guilty, but Kali asks Gomathi to shoot him to death and fights with Gomathi. During the quarrel, the trigger is accidentally pressed, and Kali dies.

In the last rites ceremony, when everyone is mourning, Vadivu says that she is pregnant with Kali's child and says that he will be reborn. Gomathi feeling guilty for killing Kali takes his ashes to Varanasi, and while dipping in the Ganges, he drowns himself.

== Cast ==
- Prithviraj Sukumaran as Gomathi Nayagam Pillai (Gomathi)
- Siddharth as Thalaivankottai Kaliyappa Bhagavathar (Kaali)
- Vedhika as 'Ganakokilam' Vadivambal (Vadivu)
- Anaika Soti as Yuvarani Rangamma (Ranga)
- Nassar as Guru Thavathiru Sivadas Swamigal (Swami)
- Ponvannan as S. V. Bhairava Sundaram Pandian
- Mansoor Ali Khan as Contract Muthuvel Kumara Pandian Kannaiah
- Thambi Ramaiah as Koduvaai
- Singampuli as Palavesam Alagiyaperumalarasan
- Kuyili as Valayampattu Valliyammal (Vadivu's mother)
- Babu Antony as Zamindar (Rangamma's father)
- Anjalidevi as Zamindharini (Rangamma's mother)
- V. K. Thanabalan as Viswanath Das
- Karikalan as Inspector Nanjandu Rao
- George Maryan as Oviyar Muthurama Lingam
- T. P. Gajendran as Dr. Venkataraman
- Kottachi as Drama Artiste

== Production ==
=== Development ===
Through one of the discussions between director Vasanthabalan and script writer Jeyamohan about old drama schools of Madurai, Jeyamohan introduced Vasanthabalan to a book called Enathu Naadaga Vazhkai, an autobiography of theatre doyen Avvai Shanmugham which helped him script the film. Vasanthabalan was inspired by the musical drama based 1979 film Sankarabharanam and the 1983 film Salangai Oli by director K. Viswanath.

Kaaviya Thalaivan was announced in September 2012 as a venture by the production house YNOT Studios teaming with Vasanthabalan and Siddharth, the latter as the lead actor of the film. The team signed A. R. Rahman to compose the music for the film in December 2012. Research work for the final script was carried out for nearly a year wherein facts, references and whereabouts were collected from veteran theatre artists belonging to different theatre clubs existing in Madurai, Dindigul, Karur and Pudukottai. As the film portrays the lives of theatre artists, the facial looks of characters were given prime importance for which make-up artist Pattanam Rasheed was signed. Perumal Selvam and Niranjani Ahathian have designed the costumes for the characters. In May 2013, convinced by the script, Prithviraj Sukumaran was signed to play the other leading role alongside Siddharth. In a press release of June 2013, the team revealed that actresses Vedhicka and Anaika Soti were also added to the cast thereafter, as were supporting actors Nassar and Thambi Ramaiah. Lakshmi Rai was also linked to play a role in the film but her inclusion remained unconfirmed. Pre-production works had begun by May 2013. Niranjani Ahathian did additional make-up for the film.

=== Filming ===
Principal photography for the film started in early June 2013, wherein reports suggested that the film would be based on the lives of yesteryear singers K. B. Sundarambal and S. G. Kittappa. However, only Vedhika's role is inspired by Sundarambal's life and the film is a musical drama of theatre artistes. Prithviraj revealed, "It is (Kaaviya Thalaivan) based on the popular theatre tradition that existed in Tamil Nadu during the 1920s and 1930s before movies took over." First and second filming schedules were completed in July and August 2013. In October 2013, the film entered its third schedule and shooting took place in Kothamangalam, Kerala. In December 2013, filming continued for an 18-day schedule in Chennai and 90% of the shooting was completed. Vasanthabalan stated there were hardly any technical challenges involved while filming, comparing the situation of cues to his previous outing Aravaan. In an interview to The Hindu, Vedhika said that each of the cast members had to sport 20-25 different looks in the film to get the feel of their characters. Jeyamohan also said the settings used for shooting the play sequences in the film provided ample space to explore the past. Vedhika prepared for her role by watching the 1966 Tamil fim Saraswathi Sabatham and drama videos. However, all the actors were asked to 'add their personal touch to their respective characters to make everything look authentic'. Being trained in Bharata Natyam, late choreographer Raghuram master choreographed her for the song "Thiruppugazh" sung by Vani Jairam. In May 2014, actor Siddharth confirmed that filming had been completed and the post-production had begun. Siddharth would reportedly be seen in 25 get-ups in the film.

== Themes and influences ==
In an interview with The Times of India, director Vasanthabalan stated that the characters of Nassar and Vedhika were inspired by real-life legends. Nassar's character Thavathiru Sivadas Swamigal, from the film, is modeled on Thavathiru Sankaradas Swamigal, whom he is considered as the father of Tamil theatre, while Vedhika's character Ganakokilam Vadivambal, has been inspired by the stage artist and singer K. B. Sundarambal.

== Music ==
The original songs and background score were composed by A. R. Rahman. Rahman underwent six months of research for the music of the film to relate it with the era of 1920s. The soundtrack has seven original songs and fourteen bit songs that form the score of the film. The first single "Vanga Makka Vaanga" (set in Bilahari raga) was released on 1 September 2014, and the second single "Yaarumilla" was released exactly a month later, on 1 October 2014. The second single made its debut on eight position on iTunes–India single tracks. The third single titled "Aye! Mr. Minor" was released on 17 October. The album was digitally released on 31 October 2014, and was aired through Suryan FM. The album for the Malayalam version Pradhi Nayagan was released on 2 November 2014.

== Release ==
The film was initially planned to release in August 2014, later pushed to release on September, then it was finally announced that the film would be released on 14 November 2014, but the release was postponed again to 28 November 2014. Dream Factory was selected to distribute the film in other countries, including India.

Kaaviya Thalaivan was declared as tax-free all over Tamil Nadu. The film was dubbed in Malayalam as Pradhi Nayagan and released on 28 November 2014, along with the Tamil version. A Telugu dubbed version titled Premaalayam was released on 1 April 2016.

== Marketing ==
The official Twitter handle of the film was launched on 23 February 2014, followed by the title logo which was released on 24 February 2014. The first look poster was released on 27 February 2014. Further, on 28 February 2014, separate posters; one featuring actor Prithviraj Sukumaran and the other featuring actor Siddharth were released. Another still featuring Prithviraj's women role was unveiled by the team on 3 March 2014. The first teaser of the film was released on 18 July 2014. The official trailer was launched on 22 October 2014, coinciding with Diwali. The second trailer of the film was released on 17 November 2014, days before its release.

== Home media ==
The satellite rights of the film were sold to Star Vijay, and the television premiere took place on 14 April 2015, coinciding with Tamil New Year's Day.

== Reception ==
According to International Business Times India, the film opened to positive reviews; Vasanthabalan was appreciated for his efforts in making a historic fiction drama, though the film's script was criticised. Sify called the film "Good" and remarked "Vasantabalan’s Kaaviya Thalaivan is a class act. A big reason the film never feels contrived is its remarkable cast and their pitch-perfect performances, authentic production designs of the period, and great camerawork" and added "Vasanthabalan deserves a pat on his back for coming out with a brave and unflinching film that oozes the kind of sincerity that you long for in most Tamil films these days." R. S. Prakash of Bangalore Mirror called the film as a "well-made fictional film crafted with a touch of class rich in aesthetics and artistry" and stated "The film's technical crew -cinematographer Nirav Shah, art designer Santhanam - have immensely contributed to the making of this extravaganza. It may have had its drawbacks, but Vasanthabalan has delivered a telling film." A reviewer from Deccan Chronicle stated "Some aspects of the script could have had a makeover, but these short coming are adequately made up by Siddharth's excellent performance. Similarly, Prithiviraj as the villain balances things out really well. This is an excellent movie straight from Balan’s heart. Although conflict may be painful; a painless solution doesn't exist in most cases. All said and done, the movie is worth a watch" and gave the rating "Good".

S. Saraswati of Rediff.com felt that the film is worth a watch, giving it a rating of 3.5 out of 5 and wrote "This is a role of a lifetime for Siddharth, a truly memorable performance. He sports innumerable looks in the film and is perfect in every one of them, totally at ease with the character and the body language. Equally adept are Prithviraj, Vedhika, Nassar and Thambi Ramaiah. On the downside, the spotlight seems to be focused a little longer than necessary on Siddharth, strengthening his character. Prithviraj and Vedhika are left holding the short end of the stick." Behindwoods rated the film 3 out of 5 and stated "Technically very sound, Kaaviya Thalaivan is marked by excellent performances and production values. Balan has brought alive in front of us the stage, the makeup, the color and the myriad other things that go into a drama production of those days. Credits are definitely due to Vasanthabalan for his efforts to showcase the tradition of performing arts in a bygone era to the WhatsApp generation. Kaaviya Thalaivan sure is a different viewing experience, give it your time and patience." At Behindwoods, Dilani Rabindran wrote "Kaaviyathalaivan deserves to be seen widely and appreciated internationally, not just because it is richly made – but because it is differently made, and the results are reverentially entertaining. It is truly sad that we don’t see more ambitious films like this in South Indian cinema, but perhaps that is what makes it such a gem. I highly suggest you do not miss seeing this rare commodity on the big screen."

However, Baradwaj Rangan of The Hindu remarked that the film had a great premise which doesn't fulfill its potential. He felt that Siddharth and Prithviraj struggled with ill-defined parts and extremely predictable events and after criticizing the film for the modernization of sequences and dialogues, selection of singers and lack of proper confrontation scenes between the protagonists, he concluded "There is no denying Vasanthabalan’s desire to make good cinema, but like his other films, Kaaviya Thalaivan makes us give him an A for effort, even as we rummage down the alphabet when it comes to aspects of the execution." Haricharan Pudipeddi of IANS stated "At the end of Kaaviya Thalaivan, there's a side in you that wants to laud the effort of auteur G. Vasanthabalan, who has always strived to give us good cinema, especially for recreating a bygone era in grand style on screen. Then, there's another side that will ask why all his films with great potential don't get their due treatment. You would salute the effort that has gone into its making, but never the final product" and rated the film 3 out of 5 and praised Vasanthabalan for extracting good performances from the principal cast and the film's offbeat theme. However, he felt that the film had a heavy reference from Mahabharata and compared the characters of Nassar, Prithviraj and Siddharth with Drona, Arjuna and Ekalavya respectively; though he felt that Arjuna and Ekalavya are pitted against each other in this film. Cinemalead rated a 3.5 out of 5 and wrote, "A classic from Vasantha Balan!".

== Accolades ==
| Award | Category | Recipient | Result | Ref |
|---|---|---|---|---|
| Tamil Nadu State Film Awards | Best Actor | Siddharth | Won | |
| Tamil Nadu State Film Awards | Best Villain | Prithviraj Sukumaran | Won | |
| Tamil Nadu State Film Awards | Best Music Director | A. R. Rahman | Won | |
| 62nd Filmfare Awards South | Best Film | YNOT Studios; Radiance Media | Nominated | |
| 62nd Filmfare Awards South | Best Director | Vasanthabalan | Nominated | |
| 62nd Filmfare Awards South | Best Actor | Prithviraj Sukumaran | Nominated | |
| 62nd Filmfare Awards South | Best Actress | Vedhika | Nominated | |
| 62nd Filmfare Awards South | Best Supporting Actor | Siddharth | Nominated | |
| 62nd Filmfare Awards South | Best Supporting Actress | Anaika Soti | Nominated | |
| 62nd Filmfare Awards South | Best Music Director | A. R. Rahman | Nominated | |
| 62nd Filmfare Awards South | Best Lyricist | Pa. Vijay | Nominated | |
| 62nd Filmfare Awards South | Best Male Playback Singer | Haricharan for "Sandi Kuthirai" | Nominated | |
| 62nd Filmfare Awards South | Best Female Playback Singer | Swetha Mohan for "Yaarumilla" | Nominated | |
| 9th Vijay Awards | Best Actor | Siddharth | Nominated | |
| 9th Vijay Awards | Best Actress | Vedhika | Nominated | |
| 9th Vijay Awards | Best Villain | Prithviraj Sukumaran | Nominated | |
| 9th Vijay Awards | Best Cinematographer | Nirav Shah | Nominated | |
| 9th Vijay Awards | Best Male Playback Singer | Haricharan for "Sandi Kuthirai" | Nominated | |
| 9th Vijay Awards | Best Choreographer | Raju Sundaram for "Sandi Kuthirai" | Nominated | |
| 9th Vijay Awards | Best Make Up | Pattanam Rasheed, Pattanam Sha, Siva, Pramod | Won | |
| 9th Vijay Awards | Best Costume Designer | Perumal Selvam, Niranjani Ahathian | Won | |
| Norway Tamil Film Festival Awards 2015 | Best Director | Vasanthabalan | Won | |
| Norway Tamil Film Festival Awards 2015 | Best Actor | Siddharth also for Jigarthanda | Won | |
| Norway Tamil Film Festival Awards 2015 | Best Actress | Vedhika | Won | |
| Norway Tamil Film Festival Awards 2015 | Best Supporting Actor | Nassar | Won | |
| Norway Tamil Film Festival Awards 2015 | Best Supporting Actress | Kuyili | Won | |
| Norway Tamil Film Festival Awards 2015 | Best Male Playback Singer | Haricharan for "Sandi Kuthirai | Won | |
| 4th SIIMA Awards | Best Actress | Vedhika | Nominated | |
| 4th SIIMA Awards | Best Music Director | A. R. Rahman | Nominated | |
| 4th SIIMA Awards | Best Female Playback Singer | Swetha Mohan for "Yaarumilla" | Nominated | |
| Edison Awards | Extreme Performance - Female | Vedhika | Won | |

== See also ==
- List of Asian historical drama films
