= Baapu =

2025 Indian Telugu-language film by Daya

- Theatrical release poster
- Directed by: Daya
- Written by: Daya
- Produced by: Raju; Ch Bhanu Prasad Reddy
- Starring: Brahmaji; Aamani; Kethiri Sudhakar Reddy; Dhanya Balakrishna
- Cinematography: Vasu Pendem
- Edited by: Aalayam Anil
- Music by: RR Dhruvan
- Production companies: Comrade Film Factory; Atheera Productions
- Release date: 21 February 2025
- Running time: 120 minutes
- Country: India
- Language: Telugu

Baapu is a 2025 Indian Telugu-language comedy drama film written and directed by Daya. The film features Brahmaji, Aamani, Kethiri Sudhakar Reddy and Dhanya Balakrishna in important roles.

The film was released on 21 February 2025.

== Plot ==
Mallanna (Brahmaji) is a marginal farmer with neck-deep debt after his cotton crop gets damaged, leaving him with no other go to repay his debt. His wife Saroja suggests him to kill his old father for the insurance amount deposited on his name. Will he take the unimaginable step and what happens at the end, is the story.

== Cast ==
- Brahmaji as Mallanna
- Aamani as Saroja
- Kethiri Sudhakar Reddy as Rajayya
- Dhanya Balakrishna as Varalakshmi
- Racha Ravi as Chanti
- Srinivas Avasarala
- Mani Aegurla

== Music ==
All music is composed by RR Dhruvan.

No.	Title	Lyrics	Singer(s)	Length
1.	"Allo Neredallo Pilla"	Raghuram	Ram Miriyala	3:20
2.	"Re Rela"	Kasarla Shyam	Madhu Priya	3:15
3.	"Kangaree Padaku Ra"	Ala Raju	Anurag Kulkarni	4:08
4.	"Saami Soodaraa"	Poorna Chary	Mangli	3:16
5.	"Baapu Oggu Katha"	Raviteja Gara	Narra Sathish Yadav	3:39

== Release and reception ==
Baapu was released on 21 February 2025. It was released on JioHotstar on 7 March 2025.

Sangeetha Devi Dundoo of The Hindu was positive towards lead cast performances, while stating that "lacklustre writing squanders the film’s potential". Aditya Devulapally of The New Indian Express wrote, "Baapu is a film that could have been extraordinary had it trusted its own cynicism. Daya constructs a world that is primed for a ruthless, pitch-black satire, but then hesitates, afraid of alienating our audiences with the film’s ambitious surgical grim".
