= Dhanya Balakrishna =

Indian actress (born 1991)

- Born: 6 August 1991 (age 35)
- Occupation: Actress
- Years active: 2011–present
- Spouse: Balaji Mohan (m. 2022)

Dhanya Balakrishna is an Indian actress who appears in Telugu and Tamil films. After making her debut in A. R. Murugadoss's 7 Aum Arivu (2011), in a supporting role, she appeared in ventures including Gautham Vasudev Menon's Neethaane En Ponvasantham (2012), Atlee's Raja Rani (2013) and Srikanth Addala's Seethamma Vaakitlo Sirimalle Chettu (2013). Dhanya made her debut as female lead in Telugu with Chinni Chinni Aasa (2013).

== Personal life ==
Dhanya Balakrishna was born in Bangalore, Karnataka. She was educated at MES. She married Tamil filmmaker and actor Balaji Mohan in January 2022 after falling in love while filming As I'm Suffering From Kadhal (2017).

== Career ==
Dhanya began her acting career with performances in theatre, before playing a supporting role in A. R. Murugadoss's 7 Aum Arivu (2011) alongside Suriya and Shruti Haasan. She was next seen in two bilingual projects, portraying supporting roles in Kadhalil Sodhappuvadhu Yeppadi (2012) and then Gautham Vasudev Menon's Neethaane En Ponvasantham (2012).

Dhanya, portrayed supporting role in the 2013 Telugu film Seethamma Vakitlo Sirimalle Chettu as a girl who proposes to the character played by Mahesh Babu; while in Raja Rani (2013), she was seen as Nivitha, a friend of Nayantara's character. Her first leading role was in the Telugu film Chinni Chinni Aasa (2013), released in November 2013, while other projects, Amrutham Chandamamalo and Second Hand, were released thereafter. She has been part of nearly 40 movies and 10 web series. She is able to speak Kannada, Tamil and Telugu fluently.

== Filmography ==
=== Films ===
List of Dhanya Balakrishna film credits
Year	Title	Role	Language	Notes
2011	7 Aum Arivu	Malathi	Tamil	Debut film
2012	Kadhalil Sodhappuvadhu Yeppadi	Rashmi	Tamil	Bilingual film; Telugu debut
2012	Love Failure	Rashmi	Telugu	Bilingual film; Telugu debut
2012	Neethaane En Ponvasantham	Nithya's friend	Tamil	Bilingual film
2012	Yeto Vellipoyindhi Manasu	Nithya's friend	Telugu	Bilingual film
2013	Seethamma Vakitlo Sirimalle Chettu	girl who proposes to Chinnodu	Telugu	
2013	Raja Rani	Nivetha	Tamil	
2013	Chinni Chinni Aasa	Nisha	Telugu	Debut as lead actress in Telugu
2013	Second Hand	Sahasra / Deepu / Swecha	Telugu	Triple Role; Also singer for "Jo Tera Hi Ho Mera Hai"
2014	Amrutham Chandamamalo	Sanjeevani "Sanju"	Telugu	India's first space comedy film
2014	Run Raja Run	Soundarya / Bangaram	Telugu	Cameo Appearance
2014	Chinnadana Nee Kosam	Nandhini's friend	Telugu	
2015	Raju Gari Gadhi	Bala Tripura Sundari	Telugu	
2015	Bhale Manchi Roju	Maya D'Souza	Telugu	
2016	Nenu Sailaja	Keerti	Telugu	
2016	Thanu Vachhenanta	Keerti	Telugu	India's first Zombie Comedy film
2016	Savitri	Gayathri	Telugu	
2017	Veedevadu	Dr.Gouthami Ramakrishna	Telugu	Bilingual film
2017	Yaar Ivan	Dr.Gouthami Ramakrishna	Tamil	Bilingual film
2017	Jaya Janaki Nayaka	Sweety's friend	Telugu	
2019	Love Action Drama	Priya	Malayalam	Malayalam debut
2019	Puzhikkadakan	Anna	Malayalam	Debut as lead actress in Malayalam
2019	Hulchul	Swathi	Telugu	
2019	Sarvajanikarige Suvarnavakasha	Jahnavi	Kannada	Kannada debut
2019	Software Sudheer	Swathi	Telugu	
2020	Anukunnadi Okati Ayinadi Okati	Dhanya	Telugu	
2022	Carbon	Swapna	Tamil	Debut as lead actress in Tamil
2022	Jagamemaya	Chitra	Telugu	25th film; released on Hotstar
2022	Nodi Swamy Ivanu Irode Heege	Gajalakshmi	Kannada	
2023	Undenama	Preethi	Kannada	
2024	RAM	Dr. Jahnavi	Telugu	
2024	Lal Salaam	Ammani	Tamil	
2024	Sharma & Ambani	Sitara	Telugu	Direct release on ETV Win
2025	Hathya	Sudha Rao	Telugu	
2025	Baapu	Varalakshmi	Telugu	
2025	Sikandar	Saisri Rajkot's Maid	Hindi	Hindi debut
2025	The 100	Madhu	Telugu	
2025	Krishna Leela	Brundha and Dakshayani	Telugu	
2025	Radheyaa	Anupama Niranjan	Kannada	
2026	Amaravathiki Aahvanam		Telugu	

=== Television ===
List of Dhanya Balakrishna television credits
Year	Title	Role	Network	Language	Notes
2016	5th South Indian International Movie Awards	Host	YouTube	Tamil	Co-hosted with Sathish
2017	6th South Indian International Movie Awards	Host	YouTube	Tamil	Co-hosted with Sathish

=== Web Series ===
List of Dhanya Balakrishna webseries credits
Year	Title	Role	Network	Language	Notes
2017	PillA	Sahasra	Viu	Telugu	Web Debut
2017	As I'm Suffering From Kadhal	Meera	Hotstar	Tamil	
2018	What's Up Velakkari	Jessi	ZEE5	Tamil	Bilingual webseries; Also dialogues in Tamil version
2018	What's Up Panimanishi	Jessi	ZEE5	Telugu	Bilingual webseries; Also dialogues in Tamil version
2019	Rakta Chandanaa	DSP Janaki Atholi IPS	Watcho	Kannada	
2021	Alludu Garu	Ammu	Aha	Telugu	Official remake of What the folks webseries
2022	Loser	Maya Krishnan	ZEE5	Telugu	Season 2
2022	Recce	Gouri	ZEE5	Telugu	
2022	Mad Company	Roshini	Aha	Tamil	

== Controversy ==
=== Offensive post targeting Tamil community ===
In 2012, when the IPL team Chennai Super Kings qualified for the playoffs, Dhanya took to Facebook and wrote a disparaging message, alleging that people from Chennai were dependent on the people of Bangalore for basic necessities. She claimed that Chennai residents (Tamils) relied on Bangalore for water and electricity, further asserting that they contributed to making Karnataka's capital unclean when visiting.

These remarks sparked significant backlash at the time. Dhanya Balakrishna initially announced her departure from Tamil cinema. However, despite this declaration, she continued to feature in Tamil films such as Raja Rani, Carbon, and Yaar Ivan, as well as in Tamil web series like As I'm Suffering From Kadhal.

In 2024, as the release of Lal Salaam, directed by Aishwarya Rajinikanth, approached, Dhanya's past comments resurfaced as she was cast as a lead in the film. People questioned the director's decision to cast someone who held negative views about the Tamil community in a Tamil film.

Responding to the controversy, Dhanya issued a statement denying authorship of the post. The actress asserted that the post was fabricated by a troll, vehemently denying ever making such derogatory comments. She pledged her professional integrity, affirming that she had never expressed such sentiments in the past.
