= Deepali Noor =

Indian fashion designer

- Born: Mumbai, India
- Occupation: Fashion designer
- Awards: Vijay Award for Best Costume Designer for her work in the film Madrasapattinam. also won the Norway Tamil Film Festival Awards for Best Costume Design
- Website: www.deepalinoor.com

Deepali Noor is an Indian fashion designer. She was born in Mumbai, Maharashtra. She was involved in advertising and modelling before joining the fashion industry.

== Achievements ==
Deepali has won several awards for her work. She won the Vijay Award for Best Costume Designer for her work in the film Madrasapattinam in 2012. She was also nominated for the same award for her work in Nanban (film) in 2010. She also won the Ananda Vikatan award in the year 2012 and the Norway Tamil Film Festival Awards for Best Costume Design in the year 2011 for her work in Madrasapattinam.

| Year | Film | Actor(s) |
|---|---|---|
| 2024 | Pushpa 2: The Rule | Allu Arjun, Rashmika Mandanna |
| 2023 | Varisu | Vijay |
| 2021 | Pushpa: The Rise | Allu Arjun, Rashmika Mandanna |
| 2021 | Minnal Murali | Tovino Thomas (only superhero costume) |
| 2018 | Sarkar | Vijay, Keerthy Suresh |
| 2018 | Thaanaa Serndha Koottam | Keerthy Suresh |
| 2016 | Mudinja Ivana Pudi | Sudeep, Nithya Menen |
| 2016 | Sarainodu | Allu Arjun |
| 2016 | Theri | Samantha |
| 2014 | Bangalore Days | Dulquer Salmaan, Fahadh Faasil, Nivin Pauly, Nazriya Nazim, Isha Talwar, Parvathy, Nithya Menen |
| 2015 | Puli | Vijay |
| 2015 | Son of Satyamurthy | Samantha |
| 2015 | Meagamann | Arya |
| 2015 | 10 Enradhukulla | Samantha |
| 2015 | Vasuvum Saravananum Onna Padichavanga | Arya |
| 2015 | Kaaki Sattai | Sivakarthikeyan, Sri Divya |
| 2015 | Pencil (film) | G V Prakash Kumar, Sri Divya |
| 2015 | I | Vikram, Ramkumar |
| 2014 | Kaththi | Vijay, Neil Nitin Mukesh, Samantha |
| 2014 | Anjaan (2014 film) | Suriya, Vidyut Jamwal, Samantha (actress) |
| 2013 | Irandaam Ulagam | Arya, Anushka Shetty |
| 2013 | Raja Rani (2013 film) | Arya |
| 2013 | Settai | Arya, Santhanam (actor), Ravikumar (actor), Hansika Motwani |
| 2013 | Thalaivaa | Vijay (actor), Amala Paul |
| 2012 | Nanban (film) | Vijay (actor), Illeana D'Cruz |
| 2012 | Run Baby Run (2012 film) | Mohanlal, Amala Paul |
| 2012 | Muppozhudhum Un Karpanaigal | Atharvaa, Amala Paul |
| 2012 | Vettai | R. Madhavan, Arya, Sameera Reddy, Amala Paul |
| 2011 | Rowthiram | Shriya Saran |
| 2010 | Chikku Bukku | Shriya Saran, Arya (actor) |
| 2010 | Boss Engira Bhaskaran | Arya (actor) |
| 2010 | Deiva Thirumagal | Vikram (actor) and entire cast |
| 2010 | Madrasapattinam | Arya, Amy Jackson & Entire Film |
| 2006 | Sillunu Oru Kaadhal | Suriya |
