= Ring Ring (2025 film) =

- Theatrical release poster
- Directed by: Shakthivel
- Written by: Shakthivel
- Produced by: Jegan Narayanan; Shakthivel
- Starring: Vivek Prasanna; Sakshi Agarwal; Daniel Annie Pope; Praveen Raj; Arjunan; Swayam Siddha; Sahana; Jamuna
- Cinematography: Prasad
- Edited by: PK
- Music by: Vasanth
- Production companies: Diya Cine Creations; Rule Breakers Productions
- Distributed by: Darwin Pictures
- Release date: 31 January 2025
- Running time: 121 minutes
- Country: India
- Language: Tamil

Ring Ring is a 2025 Indian Tamil-language comedy drama film written, directed, and co-produced by Shakthivel along with Jegan Narayanan under Diya Cine Creations and Rule Breakers Productions banners. The film has an ensemble cast including Vivek Prasanna, Sakshi Agarwal, Daniel Annie Pope, Praveen Raj, Arjunan, Swayam Siddha, Sahana and Jamuna. It was theatrically released on 31 January 2025.

== Plot ==
Four childhood friends with their respective partners get together for a birthday celebration. As the evening progresses they decide to play a dare game. Where they keep their respective phones on the table, the messages or calls that come in to be shared by all. But what begins on a light hearted note goes awry when secrets come tumbling out of closets, hidden desires are exposed, betrayal and infidelity makes its play and friendship is challenged.

== Cast ==
- Vivek Prasanna as Thyagu
- Sakshi Agarwal as Pooja
- Daniel Annie Pope as Kathir
- Praveen Raj as Shiva
- Arjunan as Sundar
- Swayam Siddha as Shailaja
- Sahana Sheddy
- Jamuna

== Production ==
The film is produced by Jegan Narayanan and Shakthivel under Diya Cine Creations and Rule Breakers Productions while the technical teams consists of cinematographer Prasad, music composer Vasanth, art director Dinesh, editor PK, and lyricist P Hariharan. Principal photography entirely took place in a huge set erected in East Coast Road, Chennai.

== Release and reception ==
Ring Ring was released in theatres on 31 January 2025. Abhinav Subramanian of The Times of India rated the film two out of five stars and wrote, "Ring Ring wants to be an intimate chamber drama about relationships and secrets. But like its trapped dinner guests, it never finds a way to make the evening worthwhile". Akshay Kumar of Cinema Express rated the film one-and-a-half out of five stars and wrote, "Ring Ring, in short, is made without being aware of the opportunities the premise offers", noting its similarities to the Italian film Perfect Strangers (2016).
