= Carbon (2022 Indian film) =

2022 Indian Tamil film

- Theatrical release poster
- Directed by: R. Srinuvasan
- Written by: R. Srinuvasan
- Produced by: A. Bhagyalakshmi; M. Anandhajothi; R. Srinuvasan
- Starring: Vidharth; Dhanya Balakrishna
- Cinematography: Vivekanand Santhosham
- Edited by: Praveen K. L.
- Music by: Sam C. S.
- Production company: Benchmark Films
- Release date: 13 January 2022
- Running time: 108 minutes
- Country: India
- Language: Tamil

Carbon is a 2022 Indian Tamil-language action thriller film written and directed by R. Srinuvasan and produced by Benchmark Films. The film stars Vidharth and Dhanya Balakrishna in the lead roles. This marks the 25th film for Vidharth. The film's music is composed by Sam C. S., with cinematography handled by Vivekanand Santhosham and editing done by Praveen K. L. The film released in theatres on 13 January 2022.

== Synopsis ==
A man with a special ability, tries to discover the identity of a mysterious hit-and-run driver who has put his father in critical condition, only to realise that the mastermind is Swapna his girlfriend who along with four men trap men for money and kill them. A furious Shankar wanted to kill Swapna, who also wanted to kill him for disrupting her plans but later he leaves her stating that he can’t kill his girlfriend. Swapna later realises her mistake

== Cast ==
- Vidharth as Shankar
- Dhanya Balakrishna as Swapna
- G. Marimuthu as Subbarayan
- Munnar Ramesh as Inspector Divakar
- Jananni as Blind Girl
- Ajay Natraj
- Vikram Jagadish
- Powlin
- Vinod Sagar
- A. Govindamoorthy

== Production ==
Benchmark Films signed on director R. Srinuvasan (who earlier directed Annadurai) to direct a film for their production house during the middle of 2020, with Vidharth to portray the leading role. The shooting of the film was started in August 2020 with the majority of the portions was shot in Chennai and the remaining portions in Tirukoilur.

== Release ==
The film got released in theatres on 13 January 2022.
