= Accidental Farmer & Co =

Tamil web series airing on SonyLiv

- Poster
- Genre: Comedy drama
- Written by: Sugan Jay
- Directed by: Sugan Jay
- Starring: Vaibhav; Ramya Pandian; Badava Gopi
- Music by: Vagu Mazan
- Country of origin: India
- Original language: Tamil
- No. of seasons: 1
- No. of episodes: 8

Production
- Executive producer: Balaji Mohan
- Producer: Raja Ramamurthy
- Editor: M. Niranjan Antony
- Running time: approx.25-30 minutes per episode
- Production companies: Trend Loud; Open Window

Original release
- Network: SonyLIV
- Release: 10 March 2023

Accidental Farmer & Co is a 2023 Indian Tamil-language comedy drama streaming television series, written and directed by Sugan Jay. It is produced for SonyLIV under the banners of Trend Loud and Open Window.

The principal characters of the series include Vaibhav, Ramya Pandian and Badava Gopi. It premiered on SonyLIV on 10 March 2023.

== Cast ==
- Vaibhav as Chellakannu
- Ramya Pandian as Sheela
- Badava Gopi as Postman
- Chutti Aravind as Moorthy
- Vinodhini Vaidyanathan as Nallamakka
- Venkatesan as Engaalu
- Inba Ravi as Durai
- Vinoth as Mani
- Naga Vishal as Sevala
- Dhanam as Engaalu's wife

== Development ==
=== Release ===
It was announced on Tuesday, 28 February 2023, that the series will be released on SonyLIV from 10 March 2023.

== Reception ==
A critic from Cinema Express wrote that "Despite a premise that offers plenty of eccentricities to play with, it is let down by blandness and needed a fleshed-out screenplay". A critic from OTTplay wrote that "Sugan Jay's eight-part series effortlessly segues from one episode to another, but as a whole, doesn't really leave an impact, thus relegating it to a one-time watch". A critic from Scroll.in wrote that "The eight-episode show could easily have been wrapped up at half the length. There is actually a fine and fun movie here, about stereotypically clueless villagers sitting on the equivalent of the discovery of oil in their backyard". A critic from India Today wrote that "An example of an excellent village-based comedy drama is Panchayat, which has all the elements in the right proportion, from performances to story to narrative style. A leaf must definitely be taken out of that show by Sugan Jay".
