= The Little Theatre (India) =

Indian theatre company for children

The Little Theatre Group is an Indian theatre company started by Aysha Rau in 1991. It was started to promote theatre for children and tap their creative potential.

The Little Theatre Group has a membership of around 70 children between the age of 5 and 14. The group promotes creative aptitude and talent through workshops in dance, mime, music, art and craft, drama, magic, photography, puppetry, pottery and 3-D projects conducted by professionals. The children, besides being in the workshop, also get to participate in their annual pantomime. In 2011 the Little Theatre produced the Indian Pantomime show called Alice in iLand which was played in The Museum Theatre in Chennai.

As of October 2018 the organization has declared that they do not have a formal internal complaints committee as required by law.

== Notable people from The Little Theatre ==
- Sunder Ramu
