= Vaayai Moodi Pesavum =

2014 Indian film by Balaji Mohan

- Theatrical release poster in Tamil
- Directed by: Balaji Mohan
- Written by: Balaji Mohan; Bipin Chandran (Malayalam dialogue)
- Produced by: S. Sashikanth; Varun Manian
- Starring: Dulquer Salmaan; Nazriya Nazim
- Cinematography: Soundararajan
- Edited by: Abhinav Sunder Nayak
- Music by: Sean Roldan
- Production companies: YNOT Studios; Radiance Media
- Release date: 25 April 2014
- Country: India
- Languages: Tamil; Malayalam

Vaayai Moodi Pesavum (transl. Speak with the mouth shut) is a 2014 Indian satirical romantic comedy film directed by Balaji Mohan. Produced by Varun Manian and S. Sashikanth under their respective production houses, Radiance Media Group and YNOT Studios, the film stars Dulquer Salmaan and Nazriya Nazim. It was filmed simultaneously in Tamil and Malayalam, the latter titled Samsaaram Aarogyathinu Haanikaram (transl. Speaking is injurious to health) with a slightly changed supporting cast. The story revolves around a flu that causes muteness.

Principal photography commenced in November 2013 and concluded a month later, taking place at Munnar. The film's technical crew includes newcomer Sean Roldan as the music composer, Soundararajan as the cinematographer and Abhinav Sunder Nayak as the editor respectively. Both the versions were released on 25 April 2014.

== Plot ==
The following plot focuses on the Tamil version only.

The story takes place in Panimalai, a hill city, during the spring season. The film begins with RJ Balaji coming to Panimalai to be a guest of a live radio show. In the middle of the show, he starts coughing severely and suddenly loses his voice. He is diagnosed with a new type of virus called the mute flu that causes sudden muteness and sometimes even death.

Aravind is a sales representative working with a glue company. His dream is to become a radio jockey, and he even attends interviews with an FM station. As the mute flu spreads across the city, the state government sends Health Minister Sundaralingam to Panimalai to take care of the situation. The people are asked to undergo a medical checkup to check whether they are affected by the virus or not. Aravind goes to the hospital and meets Anjana, a junior doctor and attends the check up. While Anjana is testing Aravind, some young boys waiting for the test tease Anjana and in frustration, Anjana pokes a cotton bud into Aravinds' nose with which he starts choking and feels like vomiting, but is comforted by Anjana and they both start talking and here we learn more about Anjana, who believes that talking is the only cause of all the problems in the world and if people keep things to themselves, then things will be very fine. Anjana is in a relationship with Vinodh, a possessive guy who always commands her on what she should do and what she should wear. Anjana lives with her father and stepmother Vidhya. Since Anjana lost her mother at a young age, she is reluctant to accept Vidhya as her mother, though she is a sweet and caring woman and always maintains a distance from her. Vidhya is an award winning writer who is trying to get her husband's attention and support to write her third book. Her husband finds no time to talk to her as he is too busy with his work.

Panimalai comes into the news for another issue, where "Nuclear Star" Bhoomesh, a film superstar who has gone to shoot one of his films, is being opposed by Mattai Ravi, a drunkard who is President of the Drinkers Association, over the issue of Bhoomesh showing drunkards in a bad light in his films. The Drinkers Association and Bhoomesh's fans, led by Ganesh, form groups to fight over this issue.

Aravind and Anjana begin a friendship, and he insists to her that if everything is spoken directly from the heart, then there would be no problem between anyone. He asks her to speak openly with Vinodh and sort out the difference of opinion between them. She does not agree to this, and Aravind challenges her that if he successfully stops the feud between Bhoomesh and Ravi just by means of speaking, Anjana should talk openly with Vinodh to sort out their issues. However Aravind hates Bhoomesh to core, even the photo of him makes Aravind feel nauseous & disgusted. They both agree on the challenge and mark a deadline day. Aravind tries so many ways to stop the feud between Bhoomesh's fans and the Drinkers Association, but it ends up in an even bitter fight. As time goes by, Aravind falls in love with Anjana, not knowing that she is engaged to Vinodh.

Aravind is brought up in an orphanage that belongs to Adhikesavan, a stubborn old man who is constantly asking the orphanage to be vacated so that he can rent it to richer tenants. Though Aravind helps the children in the orphanage by donating some of his money, it is not enough to save the orphanage. Aravind tries to speak to Adhikesavan and sort the issue, but the latter is too hesitant to speak with him. Aravind and his friend Sathish kidnap Adhikesavan and leave him in his son's house, making a close relationship.

The final report by the health organisation says that the dumb flu spreads only by means of speaking, and issues a speaking ban in the town. Everyone in the town tries to adjust to living with not speaking. Aravind conducts the meeting with the Drinkers Association and Bhoomesh's fans, and they reconcile. A cure for the illness is invented, but if the virus has already infected but has not removed the voice of a person, the cure has a 50% probability of a side effect that the patient might lose the ability to speak. The film ends with everyone getting cured, but Sundaralingam, who has been faking the illness being given cure medicine on the stage for a photo op, loses his voice for real.

== Cast ==
Actor (Tamil)	Actor (Malayalam)	Role (Tamil)	Role (Malayalam)
Dulquer Salmaan		Aravind	Aravind
Nazriya Nazim		Anjana	Anjana
Madhoo		Vidhya	Sridevi
Arjunan		Sathish	Sathish
Dev Ramnath		Vinodh	Vinodh
Pandiarajan	Maniyanpilla Raju	Sundaralingam	Prabhakaran Thanchappuzha
Kaali Venkat	Dinesh Prabhakar	Palani	Chettupara Sasi
John Vijay		"Nuclear Star" Bhoomesh	"Nuclear Star" Bhoomesh
Ramesh Thilak		Ganesh	Ramesh
Robo Shankar	Chemban Vinod Jose	Mattai Ravi	Salsakuttan
Abhishek Shankar		Vidhya's husband	Sridevi's husband
Vinu Chakravarthy		Thambidurai	Adhikesavan
Nakshathra Nagesh		Saraswathi	Saraswathi
Sathyapriya		Thambidurai's wife	Adhikesavan's wife
Leo Sivadass		Thambidurai's son	Adhikesavan's son
Surabhi Lakshmi		Arguing Wife	Arguing Wife
Rony David		Arguing Husband	Arguing Husband
Nandan Unni		Ganesh's friend	Ramesh's friend
Kamala Krishnaswamy		Orphanage's patron	Orphanage's patron
Mareena Michael Kurisingal		A girl who Sathish falls in love with	A girl who Sathish falls in love with

Tamil version

- Mime Gopi as Politician
- RJ Balaji as himself
- Venkatesh as Watchman
- Balaji Mohan as TV News Reporter for News Prime

Malayalam version

- Vijayan as Thomas Kuzhuvelikunnel
- Vineeth Sreenivasan (voice role)

== Production ==
In June 2013, the Radiance Group, led by Varun Manian entered a five-film deal with S. Sashikanth's YNOT Studios and venture into film production with a new entertainment company called Radiance Media. Varun stated that the company will be producing their first film with director Balaji Mohan for a bilingual film and plan to launch Dulquer Salmaan as the male lead, thus making his feature film debut in Tamil. Nazriya Nazim was signed as the heroine. About her role Nazriya said, "Anjana, my character, is somebody I haven't played in my career yet". Soundararajan was signed up as the cinematographer, and Abhinav Sunder Nayak as the editor.

Principal photography began in Munnar on 4 November 2013, with Madhoo joining the cast, making her comeback in the Tamil and Malayalam film industries. Each scene was first shot in Tamil and then in Malayalam. Filming concluded in December after 52 working days. Dulquer Salmaan dubbed himself in Tamil for this film.

== Themes and influences ==
Balaji Mohan described Vaayai Moodi Pesavum as a "sort of social and political satire. It presents a critique of our country's political and social setup." He described the fictional flu, which renders people incapable of speaking, as a "metaphor for society's refusal to communicate freely, which, I believe, is the root cause of all problems — personal, social and political."

== Soundtrack ==
The soundtrack and score for the film was composed by newcomer Sean Roldan. The audio launch of the Tamil version was released on 21 March 2014, while the Malayalam version was released on 11 April 2014.

== Marketing and release ==
Vaayai Moodi Pesavum and its Malayalam version, Samsaaram Aarogyathinu Haanikaram were released worldwide on 25 April 2014. As a part of the film's marketing strategy, the multiplex partner SPI Cinemas showcased exclusive game kiosks for audiences on 23 April 2014, where people would participate in the game and win exclusive tickets for the film on 25 April.

== Critical reception ==
Sify wrote, "Vaayai Moodi Pesavum is refreshingly fresh, quirky and innovative. It is one of the best romcoms laced with satire in recent times, and a lead pair that crackles", going on to add, "Balaji Mohan has reinvented the romcom formula". Malini Mannath of The New Indian Express wrote, "The film may fall short in its entertainment quotient as compared to the director's earlier film. But Mohan should be appreciated for his wacky, daring and innovative attempt". Subha J. Rao of The Hindu wrote, "While the laughter is loud and frequent in the theatre, half an hour later you wonder what the reason was for all the fuss. The film doesn't have a taut storyline that lingers in your mind. If that had been nailed, this would have been an experiment that really worked". M. Suganth of The Times of India gave the film 4/5 and wrote, "Vaayai Moodi Pesavum is truly an ambitious effort, at least by Indian cinema standards, and what's truly heartening is that Balaji Mohan succeeds in his attempt. Deccan Chronicle gave it 3.5/5 and wrote, "there are many subtexts to the film – a little too many to delve into. However, like fine wine and certain genres of music, it does take a little getting used to. Vaayai Moodi Pesavum is definitely a bold attempt". IANS also gave 3.5/5 and called it "an almost brilliant film that contradicts itself at several junctures for reasons that are never explained and left to be figured out by the viewer".

S. Saraswathi of Rediff.com gave a 3.5/5 rating and wrote, "A totally new concept coupled with the director's unique narrative style and a screenplay loaded with satire and comedy, makes Vaayai Moodi Pesavum, a thought-provoking and thoroughly enjoyable film". In contrast, Gautaman Bhaskaran of the Hindustan Times gave 2/5 and wrote, "For a good part, the film runs without dialogues, though the loud, almost irritatingly intrusive, background score robs the work of, what could have been otherwise, beautiful silence", concluding, "If only there was greater finesse in treatment and the excision of some scenes, Vaayai Moodi Pesavum could have been gripping." Aswin J Kumar of The Times of India gave the Malayalam version a rating of one-and-a-half out of five stars and opined, "At the end what we feel for this film and its director is the same emotion we reserve for a naughty kid who just wandered into a dense forest and just lost his way".
