= Hulchul (2019 film) =

- Film poster
- Directed by: Sripathi Karri
- Written by: Sripathi Karri
- Produced by: Ganesh Kolluri
- Starring: Rudraksh Utkam; Dhanya Balakrishna
- Cinematography: Raj Thota
- Edited by: Prawin Pudi
- Music by: Bharath Madhusuhanan
- Production company: Sri Raghavendra Art Creations
- Release date: 13 December 2019
- Running time: 111 minutes
- Country: India
- Language: Telugu

Hulchul is a 2019 Indian Telugu-language comedy thriller film starring newcomer Rudraksh Utkam and Dhanya Balakrishna. The film premiered was theatrically released on 13 December 2019.

== Plot ==
After returning from Dubai, Rudra receives a purse and a hulchul (drink) from his friend. He is told to give the drink to Narasimha. In a sudden turn of events, Rudra drinks the hulchul and imagines that his girlfriend, Swathi, is always in front of him. A villain and his gang comes to retrieve the purse and the hulchul. How Rudra fixes this issue forms the rest of the story.

== Cast ==
- Rudraksh Utkam as Rudra
- Dhanya Balakrishna as Swathi
- Preeti Nigam as Rudra's mother
- Krishnudu as Rudra's friend
- Madhunandan
- Ravi Prakash
- Gemini Suresh
- Shanmukh
- Jogi Naidu
- Banda Raghu

== Production ==
Hulchul finished shooting in May of 2018 and post-production work began that same month. The film was scheduled to release on 13 December 2019.

== Reception ==
The Times of India gave the film a rating of three out of five stars and wrote that "Despite the flaws, Hulchul is definitely worth a watch because it attempts to tell a different kind of tale".
