= Kadhalil Sodhappuvadhu Yeppadi =

2012 Indian film by Balaji Mohan

- Theatrical release poster
- Directed by: Balaji Mohan
- Written by: Balaji Mohan
- Based on: Kadhalil Sodhappuvadhu Yeppadi (short) by Balaji Mohan
- Produced by: S. Sashikanth; Siddharth; Nirav Shah
- Starring: Siddharth; Amala Paul
- Cinematography: Nirav Shah
- Edited by: T. S. Suresh
- Music by: Thaman S
- Production companies: YNOT Studios; Etaki Entertainment
- Distributed by: Etaki Entertainment
- Release date: 17 February 2012
- Country: India
- Languages: Tamil; Telugu

Kadhalil Sodhappuvadhu Yeppadi (transl. How to mess up in love) is a 2012 Indian Tamil-language romantic comedy film written and directed by Balaji Mohan in his feature debut. Based on Balaji's short film of the same name, it revolves around the romantic relationship between collegemates Arun (Siddharth) and Parvathy (Amala Paul).

Kadhalil Sodhappuvadhu Yeppadi was produced by S. Sashikanth under YNOT Studios, and Siddharth and Nirav Shah under Etaki Entertainment. The film was shot in Chennai, Hyderabad and Bangalore within 35 working days. It features music composed by Thaman S, cinematography is handled by Nirav Shah and editing done by T. S. Suresh. The film was partially reshot in Telugu as Love Failure.

Kadhalil Sodhappuvadhu Yeppadi and Love Failure were released worldwide on 17 February 2012 during the Valentine's Day week and were critically and commercially successful. Amala Paul received a nomination for the Filmfare Award for Best Actress – Tamil, and the film received three nominations at the South Indian International Movie Awards.

== Plot ==
Arun and Parvathi give an interview about their love story, but they fight even before the interview gets over. The film then rewinds five months earlier. Arun meets Parvathi in a college canteen, and they soon become friends. Parvathi has problems at her home, as her mother Saroja wants to divorce her father Akilan/Aravind. Arun and Parvathi fight for trivial reasons and then get together. The film revolves around how little things may contribute to break-up of a relationship.

One day, while Parvathi is stressed and wants to talk to Arun, he does not answer his phone. They fight on that issue, and gradually, the frequency of their fights grows. Arun introduces her to his parents, and Arun's father Prabhu recognises her as one of his client's daughter. He tells his son that Parvathi's parents are getting divorced. As time progresses, they break up, but the reason is not revealed. Arun's friend Vignesh tries to propose to his college junior Rashmi, but she addresses him as brother and then introduces her boyfriend, who is Vignesh's college senior. Arun tries to recover from the break-up just as his friend invites him to a trip to Pondicherry/Yanam to see his friend John. John's girlfriend Cathy starts chatting up with Arun and asks him why they broke up. Arun says that he does not have any reason, and that is his problem. Since Cathy becomes friendly with Arun, a misunderstanding crops up between Cathy and John.

Meanwhile, Prabhu advises Akilan/Aravind to reconcile with Saroja after learning that Akilan/Aravind is Parvathi's father. Akilan/Aravind and Saroja unite during Parvathi's grandparents' marriage anniversary. Consequently, John realises that Arun and Cathy are just being friendly, and he reunites with Cathy. Also, while Rashmi realises that her boyfriend is a playboy and accepts Vignesh true love. At last, Parvathi and Arun reunite after a silly quarrel in the same canteen that they met earlier.

== Cast ==
- Siddharth as Arun
- Amala Paul as Parvathi
- Suresh as Akilan/Aravind Venkatesan
- Ravi Raghavendra as Prabhu
- Surekha Vani as Saroja
- Sriranjani as Vasanthi
- Balaji Venugopal as Ramakrishnan
- Dhanya Balakrishna as Rashmi
- Shyam as John
- Arjunan Nandakumar as Siva
- Vignesh Vijayakumar as Vignesh
- Pooja Ramachandran as Cathy
- Balaji Mohan as a director in a special appearance
- Shiva as a college professor
- Jayasimha as Rashmi's boyfriend
- Aruna Bharathi as the director's girlfriend
- Iswarya Menon as Shivani
- Radhika Prasidhha as a college student
- Sree Vishnu as Rupesh (uncredited)
- Gayathri Raguram as a yoga instructor (uncredited appearance in the song "Azhaipaya")

== Production ==
"My love for my film made it easy to take on way more responsibility than would seem practical. All my risks were, at the end of the day, still conservative because the budget was fairly low. So money did not drive any decisions. I refused to let people who don't understand my film be part of it in any way. This was one of the more enjoyable and positive working experiences of my career"

— Siddharth, on turning producer for Kadhalil Sodhappuvadhu Yeppadi

Siddharth watched the 10-minute Tamil short film Kadhalil Sodhappuvadhu Yeppadi by Balaji Mohan and found it interesting, developing his ambitions to turn it into a full-length feature film. Incidentally, Balaji was holding talks with S. Sashikanth of YNOT Studios then and was planning to approach Siddharth to play the male lead role; Siddharth joined the crew and also decided to co-produce the venture with cinematographer Nirav Shah on their newly launched banner Etaki Entertainment. Balaji completed the script in three months. Regarding the title, Siddharth added that the term sodhappal (transl. messing up) was commonly used by students and is "very sub-urban in nature". He further described it as a tribute to international films.

Amala Paul joined the project in August 2011 as the lead actress. Balaji's assistant directors, Arjunan and Vignesh, played the role of Siddharth's friends; Siddharth ensured Balaji gave importance to those characters in the screenplay. Deepa Venkat dubbed for the speaking voice of Amala Paul in Tamil. The film also marked Bobby Simha's first major appearance in a feature film, where he was credited as Jayasimha. He noted that his role was larger than what it became onscreen, and although Balaji was apologetic, Simha did not mind. Siddharth wore checked shirts, a sling bag and a pair of chappals for his look in the film, owing to the attire he wore during college.

The project began production in late 2011. Filming took place in Chennai, Hyderabad and Bangalore; the locations were finalised during the pre-production stage itself. Siddharth found it challenging to complete the film in eight months in both Tamil and Telugu, but added that it helped him to be consistent in the project. He later confirmed that filming was completed in a record 35 days. The film was edited by T. S. Suresh.

== Soundtrack ==
The soundtrack was composed by Thaman S. While Madhan Karky penned the lyrics for three songs, director Balaji Mohan wrote the lyrics of the song "Ananda Jaladosam"; Sri Mani wrote all lyrics in the Telugu version.

== Marketing and release ==
Kadhalil Sodhappuvadhu Yeppadi's marketing campaign included comic book-style print advertisements. The first teaser was released on 18 December 2011 to positive response from netizens. Kadhalil Sodhappuvadhu Yeppadi and Love Failure were released on 17 February 2012, during the Valentine's Day week. They were distributed by Siddharth via his banner. The films released alongside Muppozhudhum Un Karpanaigal (another film also starring Amala Paul), Udumban, Kattupuli (dubbed version of This Weekend) and Ambuli.

=== Critical reception ===
Sify's reviewer said that the film was an "enjoyable romantic ride" that worked "largely due to its fresh script which dwells on the magic of love and its illusions", going on to label it as "jolly good fun". The Times of India critic N. Venkateswaran gave it 4 out of 5 and commented that Balaji Mohan had made an "impressive debut with his tale of love and forgiveness", while pointing out that the screenplay was "cleverly written" and the dialogues were written in an "easy, conversational tone and are sure to strike a chord with youngsters". Karthik Subramanian from The Hindu wrote: "KSY [...] is not just an experience. It is a festival. Make sure to take your entire gang along". The New Indian Express wrote, "Targeted at the urban youth, [Kadhalil Sodhappuvadhu Yeppadi] is refreshing, engaging and definitely worth a watch".

The Times of India critic Karthik Pasupleti gave the Telugu version 3.5 out of 5 and said: "Right from its unusual-yet-amusing characterization, the background score and the writing, the film is loaded with humour. As if that wasn't enough, it is nicely sugar coated from inside out". Radhika Rajamani from Rediff.com gave it 3.5 out of 5 and noted that the film was "refreshing", further citing: "It is well written and talks about love and failure in the context of life today. It gives an urbane, contemporary and realistic take on the subject. well written and talks about love and failure in the context of life today". Vishnupriya Bhandaram of The Hindu claimed, "Love Failure is a remarkably easy film to watch – no pressure, no headache. Right from the word go, its fresh, the narrative, the characters and the music". Idlebrain.com reviewer Jeevi too gave the film 3.5 out of 5, concluding that it was a "well-made urban romantic comedy told in a fresh an novel [sic] style".

=== Accolades ===
Event (Note: Awards, festivals and organisations are in alphabetical order.)	Category	Nominee(s)	Result	Ref.
Chennai Times Film Awards	Best Actress	Amala Paul	Nominated	
60th Filmfare Awards South	Best Actress – Tamil	Amala Paul	Nominated	
2nd South Indian International Movie Awards	Best Actress in a Leading Role – Tamil	Amala Paul	Nominated	
2nd South Indian International Movie Awards	Best Debutant Director – Tamil	Balaji Mohan	Nominated	
2nd South Indian International Movie Awards	Best Debutant Director – Telugu	Balaji Mohan	Nominated	

== Legacy ==
Kadhalil Sodhappuvadhu Yeppadi and Pizza became trendsetters and sparked a short-lived boom of short film directors making their feature debut in Tamil cinema and revolutionising it. Furthermore, the film's success with other contemporaneous Tamil films: Marina, Oru Kal Oru Kannadi and Kalakalappu, initiated a short-lived trend of comedy films becoming successful. Trade analyst Sreedhar Pillai noted a shift in Tamil cinema from violent revenge-based films to comedies, which were found to be more commercially viable. Sify noted that although Siddharth debuted with a Tamil film Boys (2003), he had avoided the industry for years, and the success of Kadhalil Sodhappuvadhu Yeppadi meant that Siddharth found a new market in Tamil cinema. Siddharth's Telugu film Oh My Friend (2011) was dubbed in Tamil as Sridhar and had a wide release in Tamil Nadu in May 2012. Trade attributed it partially to Siddharth's career surge after Kadhalil Sodhappuvadhu Yeppadi.
