= Siddharth (actor) =

Indian actor (born 1979)

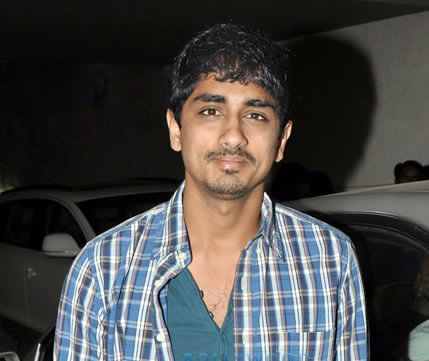
- Siddharth in 2013
- Born: Siddharth Suryanarayan; 17 April 1979 (age 47); Madras, Tamil Nadu, India
- Education: Kirori Mal College, S. P. Jain Institute of Management and Research
- Occupations: Actor; producer; playback singer
- Years active: 2003–present
- Spouses: Meghna (m. 2003; div. 2007) Aditi Rao Hydari (m. 2024)

Siddharth Suryanarayan (born 17 April 1979), known mononymously as Siddharth, is an Indian actor who primarily works in Tamil, Telugu, and Hindi language films. Apart from acting, he has also been involved in films as a screenwriter, producer and playback singer. Siddharth is a recipient of several accolades including three Filmfare Awards South and a Tamil Nadu State Film Award.

After completing his business management studies, Siddharth chose to work in film making and assisted Mani Ratnam, before going on to make an acting debut in S. Shankar's coming-of-age Tamil film Boys (2003). The success of the film provided an opportunity to feature in Mani Ratnam's multi-starrer Aayutha Ezhuthu (2004), before he branched off to receive critical and commercial acclaim in Telugu and Hindi cinema through Nuvvostanante Nenoddantana (2005), Rang De Basanti and Bommarillu (2006). The former earned him the Filmfare Award for Best Actor – Telugu. In the late 2000s, he established himself as a bankable lead actor in Telugu films and subsequently chose to become more selective with his projects, while also winning acclaim for playing a carrom player in Striker (2010) and a blind warrior in Anaganaga O Dheerudu (2011).

In 2011, Siddharth returned to Tamil films after a sabbatical and produced Balaji Mohan's commercially successful romantic comedy Kadhalil Sodhappuvadhu Yeppadi (2012). The actor then had a prolific year in 2014, winning critical acclaim and box office success for his two ventures: Jigarthanda, where he portrayed an aspiring film maker, and Kaaviya Thalaivan, in which he played an actor from the 1920s Madras theater scene. The latter earned him Tamil Nadu State Film Award for Best Actor. Following few unsuccessful films, Siddharth has received commercial success with Aranmanai 2 (2016), Sivappu Manjal Pachai (2019) and Chithha (2023). Chithha earned him the Filmfare Critics Award for Best Actor – Tamil.

Alongside his acting career, Siddharth is a philanthropist and celebrity endorser. He is married to actress Aditi Rao Hydari.

== Early life ==
Siddharth was born on 17 April 1979 in a Tamil-speaking Brahmin family in Madras (present-day Chennai), Tamil Nadu, India. He began his education at D.A.V. Boys Senior Secondary School, Madras and then studied at Sardar Patel Vidyalaya, Delhi. He subsequently graduated with a Bachelor of Commerce (Honors) degree from Kirori Mal College, New Delhi. Siddharth participated extensively in extra-curricular activities during college, serving as the president of the college's debating society and attending the World Debating Championships. He then went on to complete his MBA from S. P. Jain Institute of Management and Research, Mumbai, while also ultimately winning a speaking skills competition which earned him the CNBC Manager of the year award in 1999.

Siddharth's first tryst with media came through dubbing for the Banish mosquito repellent ad in eight different languages in 1988, as instructed by his father's close friend, ad director-cum-film director, Jayendra Panchapakesan. He noted that he knew he was headed for a career in films since childhood, showing particular fascination for writing and directing, and thus only signed up for business school as a "safety cushion" as insisted upon by his father. He then briefly pursued amateur theatre during his time in Delhi through live stage performances with the theatre group Players, while also honing his writing and directorial skills.

== Career ==
=== Early work and breakthrough (2001–2005) ===
After finishing his education, he apprenticed with ad film maker Jayendra and cinematographer P. C. Sreeram, who both helped him join as an assistant director for Mani Ratnam's Kannathil Muthamittal. He worked on the film throughout 2001, also making an uncredited appearance as a passenger on a bus. The script writer of that film, Sujatha, was insistent that Siddharth audition for Shankar's ongoing project Boys (2003), where the director had hoped to cast new actors. After consulting with Mani Ratnam, Siddharth met Shankar for an audition and was signed on the following day to play the lead role of Munna. Siddharth shot for the film in 2002 alongside fellow debutants Genelia D'Souza, Bharath, Nakul, Thaman and Manikandan, while also suffering an injury which led to him being hospitalised for three days. The story centred on six youngsters, conveying a message about the importance of a good education and career over other distractions, such as romance and sex, and marked a move away from Shankar's usual brand of vigilante films, gaining much hype and publicity prior to release. The film opened to mixed reviews but emerged as a success at the box office, with reviewers noting the ensemble cast as "excellent". Before the release of Boys, Siddharth signed on to feature in his mentor Mani Ratnam's political drama film, Aayutha Ezhuthu (2004) where he played the student Arjun Balakrishnan, a role which he described was similar to his real life persona. Featuring in an ensemble cast including Madhavan, Suriya and Trisha, Siddharth revealed that the sync sound method of filming that the team had employed, worked in his favour, as he was able to draw experience from his stage performances. The film was released in May 2004 to positive reviews, with a critic from The Hindu noting Siddharth's portrayal as "neat", while another reviewer noted that Siddharth "is cool and discovers his comic side with some great one-liners."

Siddharth then ventured into Telugu cinema by signing on to appear in the directorial debut of Prabhu Deva, the romantic drama Nuvvostanante Nenoddantana (2005), in which he was again paired alongside Trisha. Portraying the NRI youngster Santhosh, Siddharth revealed he worked hard to depict his character as "hyperactive, and unpredictable, to the point that the audience does not know what to expect from him", in order to differentiate the role from other NRI depictions in Indian films. He also was insistent that he dub for himself and learnt Telugu during the production of the film. It released in January 2005 to widespread critical acclaim, with several critics dubbing it a "must-see". A reviewer from Idlebrain.com noted Siddharth is "the surprise package" of the film, adding "he epitomized the essence of his character and won the hearts of audiences with his zest portrayal of mischievous yet lovable guy". Similarly Sify.com added "the surprise packet is Siddharth as the hyperactive, young man and he is just a riot". The film consequently went on to become an all-time blockbuster in the Telugu film industry, and Siddharth became a much sought after actor in Telugu films. The film also dominated award ceremonies the following year, with his performance fetching him his first Filmfare Award for Best Actor – Telugu for his portrayal of Santhosh. He then wrote the story and worked on the screenplay for his next release, the Telugu film Chukkallo Chandrudu (2006) directed by Sivakumar, also being credited as a playback singer for the first time. Described as a "sophisticated comedy film for multiplex crowds", it opened to mixed reviews with Siddharth's contribution described as a "redeeming factor", but failed at the box office.

=== Critical acclaim in Telugu and Hindi films (2006–2010) ===
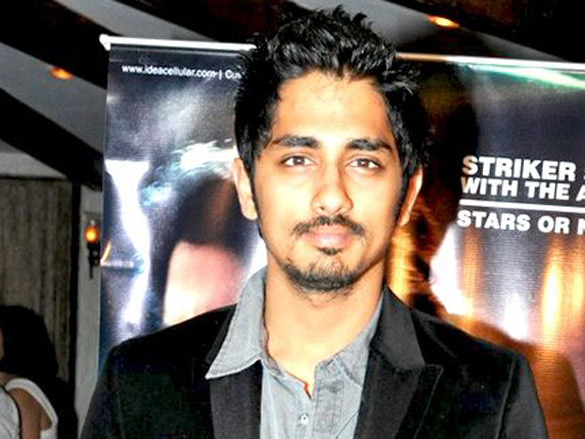
Siddharth at an event in 2010

The success of Nuvvostanante Nenoddantana saw Siddharth shift base to Hyderabad and pursue a career primarily in Telugu films, and was non-committal about taking up films in other languages. After rejecting an initial approach by Rakeysh Omprakash Mehra's team, he later agreed to work on the drama film Rang De Basanti (2006) after being impressed upon reading the film's script. He was further attracted to the offer through the opportunity of working with Aamir Khan as well as by the film's ensemble cast of Madhavan, Sharman Joshi, Kunal Kapoor and Soha Ali Khan. The film tells the story of an incident of government corruption radicalising a group of friends from being carefree to passion-driven individuals. Rang De Basanti opened in January 2006 to positive reviews and went on to become a super-hit at the box office. It was chosen as India's official entry for the Golden Globe Awards and the Academy Award for Best Foreign Language Film category, while also winning the National Film Award for Best Popular Film Providing Wholesome Entertainment and the Filmfare Award for Best Film. Portraying an angry, young man named Karan Singhania, Siddharth's performance was highly appreciated by critics, who stated he was "excellent". He received nominations for Best Supporting Actor and Best Male Debut at the Filmfare, IIFA and Zee Cine Awards.

Siddharth's next release was the Telugu family drama Bommarillu (2006), directed by Bhaskar. The film portrayed the relationship between a father and son, in which the father's excessive concern for his son, and interference in his life, leads to the latter harbouring bitterness towards his overbearing father. Cast opposite Genelia for the second time, Bhaskar revealed he chose Siddharth to play the lead role because of his similarities in body language with the character. During the shoot, the director praised the actor's versatility and dedication to the role, adding he was "mesmerised" after Siddharth performed a scene close to four minutes without a cut. Upon release in August 2006, several critics gave the film an "instant classic" status, with Idlebrain.com noting it was "picture-perfect". The lead pair won widespread critical acclaim for their performances and chemistry, with a reviewer from Sify.com stating that it was "another tailor-made role for Siddharth. He is very natural, charming and elegant" and he "melds effortlessly from a casual sangfroid to utter seriousness". Bommarillu emerged as a blockbuster at the domestic box-office, in addition to becoming the highest-grossing Telugu film internationally at the time of its release. His performance in the film earned him his second nomination for the Filmfare Award for Best Actor – Telugu. He then worked with director Vishal Bhardwaj and cinematographer Guillermo Navarro on a short film titled Blood Brothers, which premiered at the 2007 Toronto International Film Festival as part of Mira Nair's AIDS Jaago project. His next release was Aata (2007), an action drama film alongside Ileana D'Cruz, which received mixed reviews from critics. Following this, Siddharth chose to become cautious about his future ventures, revealing he "rather achieve with one good film at a time, as opposed to a barrage of mediocrity" and rejected a series of offers in Hindi and Telugu films.

Siddharth then went twenty months without a film release, taking a sabbatical and then working extensively on the making of his second Hindi film. He had two Telugu films which released in 2009, with the family drama Konchem Ishtam Konchem Kashtam opposite Tamannaah receiving mixed reviews from critics and audiences. Anand Ranga's Oy!, saw Siddharth appear in another role as a romantic hero and paired opposite actress Shamili, while he also contributed as the film's soundtrack album producer working with Yuvan Shankar Raja. The film opened to mixed reviews and had an average run at the box office, with a critic noting "Siddharth has given a brilliant performance as a lover boy, but his acting is not up to the mark in some emotional scenes". His second Hindi film, Striker (2010), was a period drama set in the 1990s portraying the life of a carrom player. Siddharth became extensively involved with the making of the film and in order to adapt into the role, he took training in the sport for two months and relocated to the Malwani district in Mumbai. Prior to release, Siddharth noted that his career as an actor in Hindi films would depend on how well the film is received and contemplated relocating his base to Mumbai. Striker became the first Indian film to be released in theatres and on YouTube on the same day, but failed to do well at the box office. However, Siddharth won positive reviews for his performance with a critic from Rediff.com noting that "this is a Siddharth vehicle from start to finish" and that "to his credit, he channelises his spontaneous presence to slip nimbly under the skin of a carrom genius, shifting his body language from a concentrating player to a smooth-talking, snarky lad entangled in a web of crime with restraint and conviction." His other release that year was the Telugu film Baava, a romantic family entertainer, which he accepted because it would show him in the different light of a village-based character. The film opened to negative reviews, with an industry pundit noting the film was "another misplaced attempt for a break" for the actor.

=== Career fluctuations (2011–2013) ===
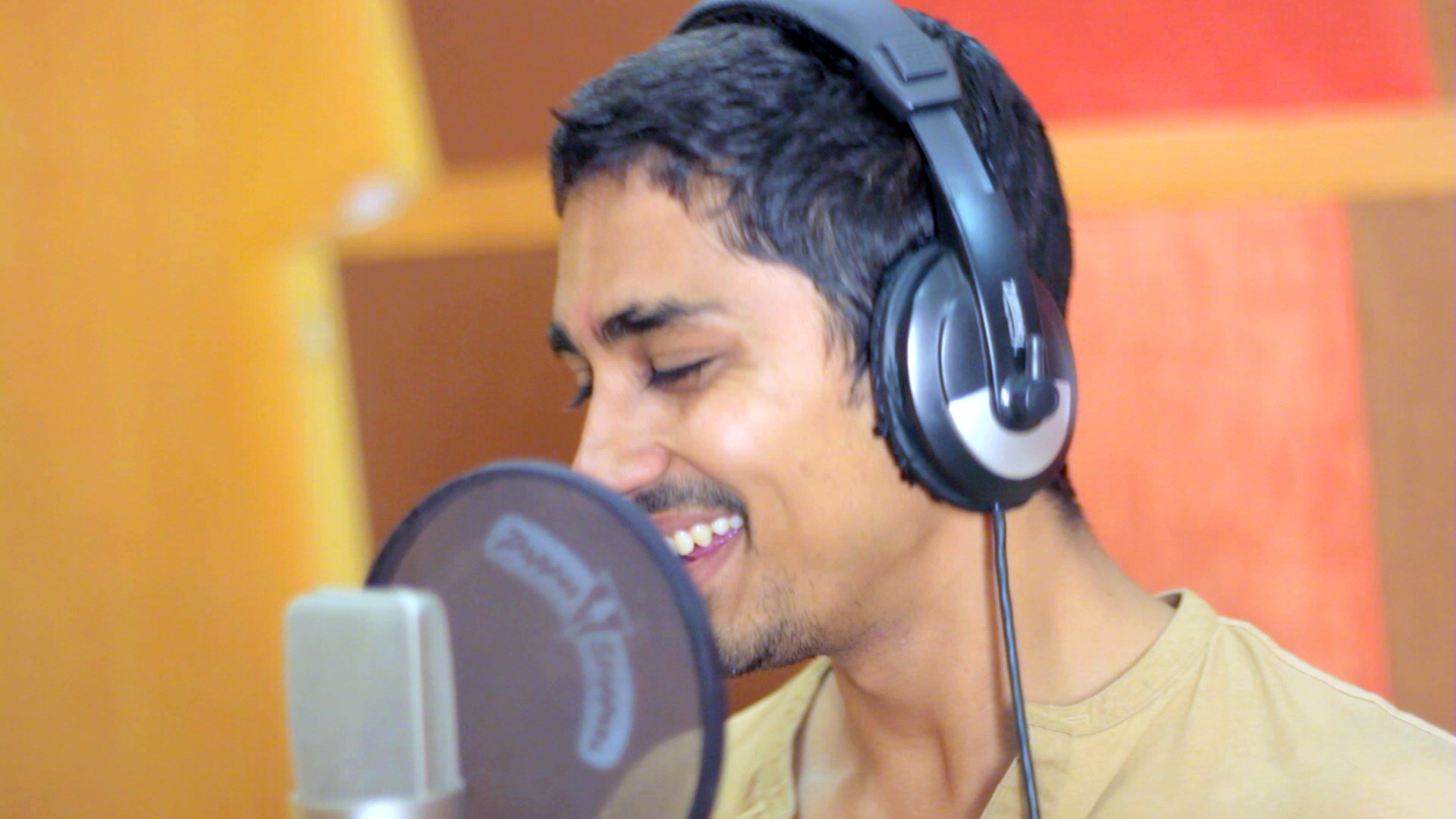
Siddharth at TeachAids recording session in 2013

The actor was then selected to portray the lead role of a blind warrior in Prakash Kovelamudi's fantasy epic Anaganaga O Dheerudu co-produced by Walt Disney Pictures and veteran director K. Raghavendra Rao. Beginning production in June 2009, it became the actor's most expensive film till date and marked the debuts of actresses Shruti Haasan and Lakshmi Manchu in Telugu cinema. The film opened with high expectations following positive pre-release promotions, but only garnered average collections and reviews from critics. While a critic from Rediff.com noted Siddharth "shines in his first true-blue action film" and that "he displays quick reflexes, agility, and keenness as the swordsman", another reviewer was more critical, stating that Siddharth "tried his best to get into the shoes of a warrior, the attire does not suit him and he displayed much innocence on his face, rendering the show a pale drama." He was next seen in the Tamil and Telugu bilingual 180 directed by his mentor, the ad director Jayendra. The venture marked his return to Tamil films after a seven-year hiatus, and he was seen portraying a doctor who flees from his American life to begin fresh in India. The film had an average run at the box office, though garnered positive reviews from critics. His third release of the year was the romantic college drama, Oh My Friend co-starring Shruti Haasan and Hansika Motwani, which opened to mixed reviews but proved to be a commercial success at the box office.

Siddharth then chose to produce his first film under his newly launched production studio, Etaki Entertainment Private Limited, which he had registered in October 2010. He financed the college romantic comedy Kadhalil Sodhappuvadhu Yeppadi (2012), based on the same-titled short film by Balaji Mohan, and featured in the lead role alongside Amala Paul. He revealed that after watching the 10-minute Tamil short film, he found it interesting and developed an interest to turn it into a mainstream full-length feature film. The film was shot over a period of eight months under a moderate budget. The film was partially reshot in Telugu as Love Failure. The film opened in February 2012 in both languages to commercial success, becoming a profitable venture at the box office. Both the film and Siddharth won positive reviews, with a critic calling it "earnest" and "well-written". In 2013, Siddharth had his most prolific year and appeared in seven film across four languages. Siddharth was selected to be a part of the ensemble cast for Deepa Mehta's Midnight's Children, a 2012 British-Canadian film adaptation of Salman Rushdie's 1981 novel of the same name. He sped read the book to prepare for his role and attended a series of workshops to portray the role of Shiva, earning positive reviews for his performance. Siddharth then worked on Nandini Reddy's Telugu romantic comedy Jabardasth opposite Samantha, with the pair portraying wedding planners. Despite hype prior to release, as a result of the pair's off-screen relationship, the film garnered poor reviews with critics noting their characters "were poorly written". The film became a commercial failure, while also becoming entangled in a legal tussle soon after release of story theft. He also was subsequently seen in Srinu Vaitla's Baadshah, performing a guest appearance in a flashback sequence. His fourth release was David Dhawan's Hindi comedy film Chashme Baddoor, a remake of the 1981 film of the same name, which received negative reviews from critics. Next, Siddharth collaborated with debutant director Manimaran for the romantic thriller Udhayam NH4, written by Vetrimaaran. The film won positive reviews and performed strongly at the box office, with a critic from Rediff.com adding the actor "has given a very mature, yet understated performance". He then featured in Sundar C's commercially successful Tamil comedy film Theeya Velai Seiyyanum Kumaru portraying a timid IT employee who seeks the help of a love guru. His popularity in Telugu cinema meant that the makers partially reshot the film in Telugu as Something Something.

=== Return to Tamil films and further success (2014–2020) ===
By early 2014, Siddharth worked simultaneously on three Tamil projects claiming in an interview to The Hindu newspaper that the year was likely to "be a turning point in his career". His first release of the year was Karthik Subbaraj's musical gangster film Jigarthanda, where he portrayed an aspiring film director who travels to Madurai to make a film based on the life and times of a notorious rowdy. Siddharth was chosen by the director as "he had not done a role like it before", and his on screen character was named after and drew allusions to Karthik Subbaraj's career as a filmmaker. Co-starring Bobby Simha as the rowdy and Lakshmi Menon, Jigarthanda opened to positive reviews in August 2014. Reviewers noted Siddharth "gives a commendable performance" and that he "was simply terrific in the scenes where he plays a cat and mouse game with the gangster". The film subsequently went on to become among the most profitable Tamil films of the year, while earning "cult status" amongst the audience. The success of the film meant that Siddharth had four successive commercially successful films in Tamil and was at the peak of his career in the industry.

His next release was Vasanthabalan's historical fiction film, Kaaviya Thalaivan, depicting the life of performers from the Madras theatre circuit from the 1920s. Siddharth was associated with the project right from the scripting stages in 2011, and was instrumental in helping bring the producers and A. R. Rahman become a part of the venture. Working alongside Prithviraj and Vedhika, he portrayed the leading role of Thalaivankottai "Kaali"appa Bhagavathar, a Madras theatre artiste, loosely based on the life of actor S. G. Kittappa. To prepare for the role, he studied the work of actors from the 1920s and made himself familiar with the lives of artistes from that time period, noting his stint in theatre was helpful. The film opened to unanimously positive reviews in November 2014, with Siddharth's performance receiving critical acclaim. A reviewer from Rediff.com noted "This is a role of a lifetime for Siddharth, a truly memorable performance. He sports innumerable looks in the film and is perfect in every one of them, totally at ease with the character and the body language", while Sify.com added "he has done a magnificent job and his eyes speak the sadness of his character." His performance in the film earned him his first nomination for the Filmfare Award for Best Actor – Tamil. Siddharth's next on-screen appearance was in Enakkul Oruvan (2015), a remake of the successful Kannada film Lucia (2013), which was produced by C. V. Kumar. Appearing in two roles as a successful actor and as a village theatre operator, Siddharth appeared in one sporting a dark complexion for the first time. The film opened to positive reviews, with a critic from Sify.com stating that Siddharth does "an extraordinary job of sinking his teeth into the two characters with consummate ease", adding that the film was a "bold and unique attempt with sharp performances and a tight script". Similarly, a reviewer from Behindwoods.com stated he gave "a neat and apt enactment" in the two roles. However both Kaaviya Thalaivan and Enakkul Oruvan failed commercially at the box office, prompting the actor to take a break from films. After a six-month sabbatical, Siddharth announced that he had finished work on another acting and production venture, Jil Jung Juk by newcomer Deeraj Vaidy. He has also worked on Sundar C's horror comedy, Aranmanai 2 alongside Trisha and Hansika Motwani. It was a commercial success at the box office.

After a series of template horror-comedy films, Siddharth and Milind Rau have come up with Aval, a smartly made thriller mixed with emotions. The script is considered to be based on a real-life incident. Apart from producing and acting, Siddharth has also co-written the movie with Milind Rau. The film was made as a bilingual in Hindi (titled The House Next Door) and dubbed in Telugu as Gruham. In 2018, he expanded to Malayalam films with Kammara Sambhavam, which later gained cult following.

Siddharth made his web debut with the Hindi series Leila, his first release of 2019. The series was short with one season and 6 episodes, appearing on the Netflix site. In September 2019, Sasi's Sivappu Manjal Pachai was released. GV Prakash Kumar is a street racer while Rajasekar (Siddharth) is a traffic cop. Siddharth sheds his ‘chocolate boy’ image to play an astute, hyper-masculine. The film was released to positive reviews. The film was a box office success. In October 2019, he appeared in Aruvam, a supernatural thriller film which received mixed reviews and was a box office average.

=== Career progression and streaming projects (2021–present) ===
In 2021, Siddharth played a corrupt civil services aspirant in the Telugu film Maha Samudram opposite Aditi Rao Hydari. It opened to mixed-to negative reviews and underperformed at the box office. In the same year, he also played a calligrapher in a segment of the Tamil series Navarasa opposite Parvathy. The series opened to positive reviews. Siddharth started 2022 with the Hindi series Escaype Live, where he played a content moderator. Abhimanyu Mathur stated, "Siddharth is effortless as the show’s moral compass but seems restricted somehow, because of the writing."

Siddharth's first release of 2023 was the long delayed Tamil film Takkar. Siddharth then played a paternal uncle fighting for his niece, who faced abuse opposite Nimisha Sajayan in the Tamil film Chithha. He also produced the film, when was released to critical acclaim. The film became a commercial success. Kirubhakar Purushothaman of The Indian Express called it Siddharth’s "best performance" and added, "His scream when he realises his nephew is alive is haunting. The moment where he breaks down realising even his family perceives him as a criminal is devastating." His performance earned him Filmfare Critics Award for Best Actor – Tamil.

Following Chithha success, Siddharth had two Tamil film releases in 2024. He first played an online media reporter opposite Rakul Preet Singh in Indian 2. The film released to mixed review but emerged as one of the highest grossing film of the year. Latha Srinivasan noted, "It is Siddharth who has a very meaty role in this film. The actor has delivered; he and Kamal Haasan match up in their scenes together." Siddharth later played an aspiring director facing memory loss opposite Ashika Ranganath in Miss You. Avinash Ramachandran stated, "It is a thorough Siddharth star vehicle and the actor makes the maximum use of a character that offers him the best of both worlds." It was a moderate success at the box office.

In his first release of 2025, Siddharth played an ageing cricketer opposite Meera Jasmine in Test. Nandini Ramnath of Scroll.in stated, "Siddharth’s near-robotic Arjun comes to life when the cricketer faces his worst nightmare." Despite mixed reviews, the film achieved high viewership. He then played a middle class man struggling to buy his own home in 3BHK, opposite Chaithra J. Achar. Vishal Menon from The Hollywood Reporter India was appreciative of his performance with "understated softness". The film became a box office success.

Siddharth had two streaming releases in 2026. He first portrayed Squadron leader Ajay Ahuja opposite Amrita Bagchi, in Operation Safed Sagar, based on the Operation Safed Sagar, of Kargil War. Shomini Sen opined "Siddharth lead a formidable cast and is pitch-perfect in his character."

== Other work and media image ==
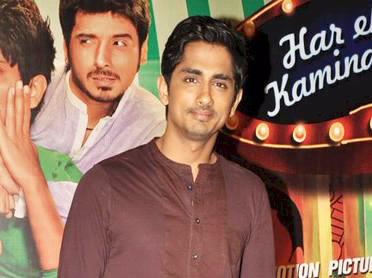
Siddharth at an event for Chashme Baddoor, in 2013

In Rediff.com's "Top Telugu Actors" list, Siddharth was placed 5th in 2006. In its "Top Tamil Actors" list, he was placed 5th in 2012. In the Chennai Times Most Desirable Men list, Siddharth was placed 12th in 2015, 13th in 2016, 14th in 2017 and 16th in 2018. In the Hyderabad Times Most Desirable Men list, he was placed 29th in 2016. Siddharth lend his support to various causes. In 2013, he gave his voice for an HIV/AIDS education animated software tutorial created by the nonprofit organization TeachAids. Siddharth actively coordinated relief measures, organized supplies, and helped those stranded in the 2015 South India floods. He also lend his voice to "Spirit of Chennai", a song made as a flood relief anthem in response to the floods. Siddharth is a celebrity endorser for several brands such as Frooti, Lux and Cinthol.

=== Etaki Entertainment ===
Siddharth produces films under the company Etaki Entertainment. It derives its name from the Bengali word "Etaki" (transl. What is this?), which was the first word Siddharth recorded for a Bengali commercial during his stint as a child model. Since the term is a question, he made the company's logo a question mark.

== Personal life ==
In November 2003, Siddharth married Meghna after growing up together in New Delhi. The couple divorced in January 2007.

Siddharth met actress Aditi Rao Hydari while working on the film Maha Samudram (2021), and the two began dating the same year. The couple announced their engagement on 28 March 2024. Siddharth married Hydari on 16 September 2024 at Sri Ranganayaka Swamy Temple, Wanaparthy.

== Filmography ==
Key
†	Denotes films that have not yet been released

=== Films ===
List of films and roles
Year	Title	Role(s)	Language	Notes	Ref.
2002	Kannathil Muthamittal	Bus passenger	Tamil	Uncredited role	
2003	Boys	Munna	Tamil	Debut film	
2004	Aayutha Ezhuthu	Arjun Balakrishnan	Tamil		
2005	Nuvvostanante Nenoddantana	Santosh	Telugu		
2006	Chukkallo Chandrudu	Arjun / Krishna	Telugu	Also writer	
2006	Rang De Basanti	Karan Singhania / Bhagat Singh	Hindi		
2006	Bommarillu	Siddharth Addala	Telugu		
2007	Aata	Sri Krishna	Telugu		
2009	Konchem Ishtam Konchem Kashtam	Siddharth	Telugu		
2009	Oy!	Uday	Telugu		
2010	Striker	Suryakant Sarang	Hindi		
2010	Baava	Veera Babu / young Seetharamudu	Telugu		
2011	Anaganaga O Dheerudu	Yodha	Telugu		
2011	180; Nootrenbadhu	Ajay Kumar alias Mano alias José	Telugu; Tamil		
2011	Oh My Friend	Chandu	Telugu		
2012	Kadhalil Sodhappuvadhu Yeppadi	Arun	Tamil	Partially reshot in Telugu as Love Failure; Also producer	
2012	Midnight's Children	Shiva	English		
2013	Jabardasth	Bairraju	Telugu		
2013	Baadshah	Siddhu	Telugu	Cameo appearance	
2013	Chashme Baddoor	Jai	Hindi		
2013	Udhayam NH4	Prabhu	Tamil		
2013	Theeya Velai Seiyyanum Kumaru	Kumar	Tamil	Partially reshot in Telugu as Something Something	
2014	Jigarthanda	Karthik Subramaniam	Tamil		
2014	Kaaviya Thalaivan	Thalaivankottai Kaliappa Bhagavathar	Tamil		
2015	Enakkul Oruvan	Vicky / Viknesh	Tamil		
2016	Aranmanai 2	Murali	Tamil		
2016	Jil Jung Juk	Jil	Tamil	Also producer	
2017	Aval; The House Next Door	Doctor Krishnakanth	Tamil; Hindi	Also producer and co-writer	
2018	Kammara Sambhavam	Othenan Nambiar	Malayalam		
2019	Sivappu Manjal Pachai	K. Rajasekar	Tamil		
2019	Aruvam	Jagannathan	Tamil		
2021	Maha Samudram	Vijay	Telugu		
2023	Takkar	Gunashekharan	Tamil		
2023	Chithha	Eeswaran	Tamil	Also producer	
2024	Indian 2	Chitra Aravindan	Tamil		
2024	Miss You	Vasudevan	Tamil		
2025	Test	Arjun Venkataraman	Tamil		
2025	3BHK	Prabhu Vasudevan	Tamil		
2026	Lust Stories 3	Badru	Hindi	Netflix film	

=== Short film ===
List of short films and roles
Year	Title	Role(s)	Language	Notes	Ref.
2007	Blood Brothers	Arjun Dutt	Hindi		

=== Television ===
List of television roles
Year	Title	Role	Language	Notes	Ref.
2019	Leila	Bhanu	Hindi		
2021	Navarasa	Farooq	Tamil	Also producer	
2022	Escaype Live	Krishna Rangaswamy	Hindi		
2023	Baakiyalakshmi	Eeswaran	Tamil	Cameo appearance	
2026	Operation Safed Sagar	Squadron leader Ajay Ahuja	Hindi		

=== Voice artist ===
List of films and roles
Year	Title	Role(s)	Language	Notes	Ref.
2019	The Lion King	Simba	Tamil	Dubbed version	
2024	Ayalaan	Tattoo	Tamil		

== Discography ==
List of songs
Year	Title	Language	Song(s)	Composer(s)
2006	Chukkallo Chandrudu	Telugu	"Everybody", "Edhalo Epudo"	Chakri
2006	Bommarillu	Telugu	"Appudo Ippudo"	Devi Sri Prasad
2007	Aata	Telugu	"Ninu Chusthunte"	Devi Sri Prasad
2008	Santosh Subramaniam	Tamil	"Adada Adada"	Devi Sri Prasad
2009	Oy!	Telugu	"Oy Oy"	Yuvan Shankar Raja
2009	Seeta Ramula Kalyanam Lankalo	Telugu	"Konchem"	Anup Rubens
2010	Striker	Hindi	"Haq Se"	Yuvan Shankar Raja
2010	Striker	Hindi	"Bombay Bombay"	Amit Trivedi
2010	Baava	Telugu	"Baava Baava"	Chakri
2011	Oh My Friend	Telugu	"Maa Daddy Pockets", "Sri Chaitanya Junior College"	Rahul Raj
2012	Kadhalil Sodhappuvadhu Yeppadi	Tamil	"Parvathi Parvathi", "Ananda Jaladosam"	S. Thaman
2012	Love Failure	Telugu	"Parvathi Parvathi", "Happy Heart Attack"	S. Thaman
2013	NH4 (D)	Telugu	"Neevevvaro"	G. V. Prakash Kumar
2014	Enakkul Oruvan	Tamil	"Prabalamagavey"	Santhosh Narayanan
2014	Naalo Okkadu (D) ^{Telugu dub of Enakkul Oruvan}	Telugu	"Pramukha Thaararaa"	Santhosh Narayanan
2015	Strawberry	Tamil	"Strawberry"	Taj Noor
2016	Jil Jung Juk	Tamil	"Shoot The Kili"	Vishal Chandrasekhar
2017	Taramani	Tamil	"Unn Badhil Vendi"	Yuvan Shankar Raja
2019	Simba	Tamil	"Bow Wow Vadai"	Vishal Chandrasekhar
2019	Ninu Veedani Needanu Nene	Telugu	"Excuse Me Rakshasi"	S. Thaman
2020	Arivum Anbum (song)	Tamil	"Arivum Anbum"	Ghibran
2023	Takkar	Tamil	"Nira – Reprise Version"	Nivas K. Prasanna
2023	Takkar (D)	Telugu	"Nuvvo Sagam"	Nivas K. Prasanna
2024	Lover	Tamil	"Apple Crumble"	Sean Roldan
2024	Yezhu Kadal Yezhu Malai	Tamil	"Marubadi Nee"	Yuvan Shankar Raja
2024	Miss You	Tamil	"Nee Enna Paathiye"	Ghibran
2025	Paranthu Po	Tamil	"Daddy Romba Paavam"	Santhosh Dhayanidhi

== Accolades ==
List of awards and nominations
Year	Title	Award	Category	Result	Ref.
2004	Boys	International Tamil Film Awards	Best New Actor	Won	
2005	Nuvvostanante Nenoddantana	Filmfare Awards South	Best Actor – Telugu	Won	
2007	Bommarillu	Filmfare Awards South	Best Actor – Telugu	Nominated	
2007	Bommarillu	Filmfare Awards South	Best Male Playback Singer – Telugu (for "Apudo Ipudo")	Nominated	
2007	Rang De Basanti	Filmfare Awards	Best Supporting Actor	Nominated	
2007	Rang De Basanti	International Indian Film Academy Awards	Star Debut of the Year – Male	Won	
2007	Rang De Basanti	Screen Awards	Best Male Debut	Nominated	
2007	Rang De Basanti	Zee Cine Awards	Best Supporting Actor	Nominated	
2007	Rang De Basanti	Zee Cine Awards	Best Male Debut	Nominated	
2007	Rang De Basanti	Stardust Awards	Superstar of Tomorrow - Male	Nominated	
2007	Rang De Basanti	Global Indian Film Awards	Best Male Debut	Nominated	
2015	Jigarthanda	South Indian International Movie Awards	Best Actor – Tamil	Nominated	
2015	Jigarthanda	Norway Tamil Film Festival Awards 2015	Best Actor	Won	
2015	Kaaviya Thalaivan	Norway Tamil Film Festival Awards 2015	Best Actor	Won	
2015	Kaaviya Thalaivan	Tamil Nadu State Film Awards	Best Actor	Won	
2015	Kaaviya Thalaivan	Filmfare Awards South	Best Actor – Tamil	Nominated	
2015	Kaaviya Thalaivan	Vijay Awards	Best Actor	Nominated	
2022	Maha Samudram	South Indian International Movie Awards	Best Actor in a Negative Role – Telugu	Nominated	
2024	Chithha	Ananda Vikatan Cinema Awards	Best Actor	Won	
2024	Chithha	Filmfare Awards South	Best Film - Tamil	Won	
2024	Chithha	Filmfare Awards South	Best Actor – Tamil	Nominated	
2024	Chithha	Filmfare Awards South	Best Actor Critics - Tamil	Won	
2024	Chithha	South Indian International Movie Awards	Best Actor – Tamil	Nominated	
