= Balaji Mohan =

Indian filmmaker and actor (born 1987)

- Born: 25 May 1987 (age 39); Tiruchirappalli, Tamil Nadu, India
- Occupations: Filmmaker; Actor
- Years active: 2012–present
- Known for: Kadhalil Sodhappuvadhu Yeppadi; Vaayai Moodi Pesavum; Maari
- Spouses: Aruna (m. 2012; div. 2016); Dhanya Balakrishna (m. 2022)

Balaji Mohan (born 25 May 1987) is an Indian filmmaker and actor in Tamil-language films. After discontinuing his engineering studies to pursue his passion for becoming a director, he enrolled at a film academy and attended courses and workshops, besides participating in short film contests. After shooting over half a dozen short films, he directed his first full-length film, a romantic comedy Kadhalil Sodhappuvadhu Yeppadi based on one of his short films.

== Early life ==
Balaji was born on 25 May 1987 in Tiruchirappalli to a Telugu father and Tamil mother. He pursued his schooling at Campion Anglo-Indian Higher Secondary School, Tiruchirappalli, and later joined the Sri Sivasubramaniya Nadar College of Engineering in Chennai for his higher studies, albeit he had decided in 10th grade already that he wanted to become a director. He recalls that his parents bought him a handycam in his third semester, and he made his first short film called Velicham, which was also sent to film festivals and won. Although he had initially planned to complete his education before following his passion and pursuing a career in filmmaking, he did not want to "wait for too long" after making Velicham. After convincing his parents, he discontinued his engineering course two years later and went on to join the L. V. Prasad Film and TV Academy in Vadapalani, Chennai, to learn editing and sound design. He also studied acting at the Alchemy Institute, Adyar, Chennai.

== Personal life ==
Balaji Mohan got married in June 2012 to Aruna. In May 2016, Balaji announced his divorce due to irreconcilable differences. In January 2022, he married Dhanya Balakrishna, who co-starred with him in his directorial As I'm Suffering From Kadhal (2017).

== Career ==
Balaji began his career as an assistant director for the Tamil film called Kulir 100° (2009). While the film was in its pre-production stage, he got the opportunity to join the Gateway to Hollywood, a show that was aired in Sony TV. His short film Treasure was featured in the contest and Balaji became one of the 6 finalists of the show. He later joined as an assistant director for Sudha K. Prasad's Tamil film Drohi (2010), while simultaneously participating in Kalaignar TV's first season of Naalaya Iyakunar. He directed five short films namely Kodi, The Juniors, Addi Tail, Mittai Veedu and Kadhalil Sodhappuvadhu Yeppadi for the show and was one of the winners of the series award for consistent performance.

Among his works, Kadhalil Sodhappuvadhu Yeppadi was most popular and went viral on YouTube, garnering overwhelming response. Cinematographer Nirav Shah saw the short film and initiated the idea to make it into a full-length feature film. Balaji took three months to develop the script, while Nirav Shah reached out to producers and actors, introducing him to producer Sashikanth of YNot Movies. Siddharth, who too was keen on turning the short film into a feature film after he had seen it, entered the project, playing the lead role besides co-producing the venture. The film was partially reshot in Telugu. The project was completed in a record 36 days, and the film was released in February 2012. Opening to highly positive critical response, the film went on to become a sleeper hit.

Balaji Mohan collaborated with Dulquer Salmaan for his second directorial venture, a bilingual titled Vaayai Moodi Pesavum in Tamil and Samsaaram Aarogyathinu Haanikaram in Malayalam. The film marked Balaji Mohan's debut in Malayalam cinema and Dulquer Salmaan's debut in Tamil cinema. His third film was Maari, starring Dhanush and it released in July, 2015. Next, he teamed up with actor Dhanush again for Maari 2, a sequel to Maari.

He then produced, written and directed a web series titled As I'm Suffering From Kadhal, in which he also played an important role. The series was made in Tamil and dubbed in Telugu. It was released in Hotstar Originals on 15 June 2017. In late 2022, he began directing Kaadhal Konjam Thookala, an adaptation of the novel Make it 2 by Sharada Subramanian, with Kalidas Jayaram and stand-Up comedian Nirmal Pillai in the lead roles; the film, despite some filming progress, ended up languishing in production hell.

In 2023, Mohan produced the Tamil-language comedy drama television series Accidental Farmer & Co which streamed on SonyLiv.

== Filmography ==
=== As a film director ===
| Year | Title | Language | Notes | Ref. |
|---|---|---|---|---|
| 2012 | Kadhalil Sodhappuvadhu Yeppadi | Tamil | Nominated—SIIMA Award for Best Debut Director | |
| 2012 | Kadhalil Sodhappuvadhu Yeppadi | Tamil | Partially reshot in Telugu as Love Failure | |
| 2014 | Vaayai Moodi Pesavum | Tamil | Bilingual film | |
| 2014 | Samsaaram Aarogyathinu Haanikaram | Malayalam | Bilingual film | |
| 2015 | Maari | Tamil | | |
| 2018 | Maari 2 | Tamil | | |
| 2026 | Nayyi Navelli | Hindi | | |

=== As an actor ===
List of Balaji Mohan film acting credits
| Year | Title | Role | Notes |
|---|---|---|---|
| 2010 | Thurumbilum Iruppan | Balu | Short film |
| 2012 | Kadhalil Sodhappuvadhu Yeppadi | Narrator | |
| 2014 | Vaayai Moodi Pesavum | News reporter | |
| 2015 | Maari | Man in auto rickshaw | |
| 2017 | Pa. Pandi | Raghavan | |
| 2017 | Velaiilla Pattadhari 2 | Balaji | |
| 2021 | Vinodhaya Sitham | Doctor | |
| 2023 | Thrishanku | Himself | Malayalam film |

=== As a producer ===
List of Balaji Mohan film producing credits
| Year | Title | Credited as | Notes |
| Year | Title | Producer | Notes |
|---|---|---|---|
| 2021 | Mandela | Yes | |
| 2022 | Mad Company | Creative | |
| 2023 | Accidental Farmer and Co | Creative | |

=== Television ===
List of Balaji Mohan film producing credits
| Year | Series | Notes | Ref. |
|---|---|---|---|
| 2017 | As I'm Suffering From Kadhal | Hotstar | |
| 2022 | Putham Pudhu Kaalai Vidiyaadhaa | Anthology – Amazon Prime Video; Segment: Mugakavasa Mutham | |
| 2026 | #Love | Netflix | |

=== Short films ===
| Title | Notes |
|---|---|
| Velicham | |
| Kadhalil Sodhappuvadhu Yeppadi | |
| Chronos | credited as M. Balaji |
