= List of accolades received by Paradesi (2013 film) =

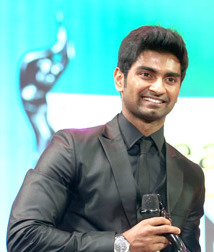
- Atharvaa's performance in Paradesi garnered him several awards and nominations
Accolades
Award	Won	Nominated
Ananda Vikatan Cinema Awards	6	6
BFI London Film Festival	2	8
Chennai International Film Festival	1	1
Edison Awards	6	6
Filmfare Awards South	3	9
National Film Awards	1	1
Norway Tamil Film Festival Awards	4	4
South Indian International Movie Awards	2	5
Tamil Nadu State Film Awards	3	3
Techofes Awards	5	5
Vijay Awards	4	11
- Total number of awards and nominations (Note: Awards in certain categories do not have prior nominations and only winners are announced by the jury. For simplification and to avoid errors, each award in this list has been presumed to have had a prior nomination.)
Totals	37	59
- References

Paradesi (transl. Vagabond) is a 2013 Indian Tamil-language period drama film written, produced and directed by Bala. The film features Atharvaa and Vedhika in the lead roles, with Sai Dhanshika, Uday Karthik, Riythvika and Jerry in supporting roles. The soundtrack and score were composed by G. V. Prakash Kumar. The cinematography was handled by Chezhiyan, while Kishore Te and L. V. K. Das were in charge of the editing. Based on Paul Harris Daniel's 1969 novel Red Tea, the film's story revolves around Raasa (Atharvaa), an unemployed villager who is misled into bonded labour at a tea plantation after being promised generous accommodation and wages by its supervisor (Jerry).

Paradesi was made on a budget of ₹400 million (Note: The average exchange rate in 2013 was 60.936 Indian rupees (₹) per 1 US dollar (US$).) and was released on 15 March 2013 to critical acclaim, but failed at the box office. The film won 37 awards from 59 nominations; its direction, performances of the cast members, music, cinematography, and costumes have received the most attention from award groups.

At the 60th National Film Awards, Poornima Ramasamy won for Best Costume Design. Paradesi led the 61st Filmfare Awards South with nine nominations including Best Film (Bala) and Best Actress (Vedhika). It went on to win for Best Director (Bala), Best Actor (Atharvaa) and Best Supporting Actress (Dhanshika). At the 8th Vijay Awards, the film received eleven nominations including those for Best Film and Best Actor, and won four, Best Director, Best Supporting Actress, Best Make Up Artistes and Best Costume Designer. Paradesi was nominated for eight awards at the BFI London Film Festival and won for Best Cinematography and Best Costume Designer. It garnered five nominations at the 3rd South Indian International Movie Awards ceremony and won two awards, Best Director and a Special Appreciation. Among other wins, the film received six Ananda Vikatan Cinema Awards and Edison Awards each, five Techofes Awards, four Norway Tamil Film Festival Awards, three Tamil Nadu State Film Awards and a Chennai International Film Festival award.

== Awards and nominations ==
Award	Date of ceremony (Note: Date is linked to the article about the awards held that year, wherever possible.)	Category	Recipient(s) and nominee(s)	Result	Ref(s)
Ananda Vikatan Cinema Awards	8 January 2014	Best Film	Bala	Won	
Ananda Vikatan Cinema Awards	8 January 2014	Best Director	Bala	Won	
Ananda Vikatan Cinema Awards	8 January 2014	Best Actor	Atharvaa	Won	
Ananda Vikatan Cinema Awards	8 January 2014	Best Supporting Actress	Sai Dhanshika	Won	
Ananda Vikatan Cinema Awards	8 January 2014	Best Cinematographer	Chezhiyan	Won	
Ananda Vikatan Cinema Awards	8 January 2014	Best Costume Designer	Poornima Ramasamy and Perumal Selvam	Won	
BFI London Film Festival	13–18 October 2013	Best Film	Bala	Nominated	
BFI London Film Festival	13–18 October 2013	Best Foreign Language Feature Film	Bala	Nominated	
BFI London Film Festival	13–18 October 2013	Best Director of a Foreign Film	Bala	Nominated	
BFI London Film Festival	13–18 October 2013	Best Director of a Foreign Feature Film	Bala	Nominated	
BFI London Film Festival	13–18 October 2013	Best Lead Actor	Atharvaa	Nominated	
BFI London Film Festival	13–18 October 2013	Best Cinematography	Chezhiyan	Won	
BFI London Film Festival	13–18 October 2013	Best Costume Designer	Poornima Ramaswamy	Won	
BFI London Film Festival	13–18 October 2013	Best Music	G. V. Prakash Kumar	Nominated	
Chennai International Film Festival	19 December 2013	Special Jury Award	Atharvaa	Won	
Edison Awards	16 February 2014	Best Director	Bala	Won	
Edison Awards	16 February 2014	Extreme Performance – Male	Atharvaa	Won	
Edison Awards	16 February 2014	Extreme Performance – Female	Vedhika	Won	
Edison Awards	16 February 2014	Best Character Award – Female	Sai Dhanshika	Won	
Edison Awards	16 February 2014	Best Cinematographer	Chezhiyan	Won	
Edison Awards	16 February 2014	Best Costume Designer	Poornima Ramasamy	Won	
Filmfare Awards South	12 July 2014	Best Film – Tamil	Bala	Nominated	
Filmfare Awards South	12 July 2014	Best Director – Tamil	Bala	Won	
Filmfare Awards South	12 July 2014	Best Actor – Tamil	Atharvaa	Won	
Filmfare Awards South	12 July 2014	Best Actress – Tamil	Vedhika	Nominated	
Filmfare Awards South	12 July 2014	Best Supporting Actor – Tamil	Jerry	Nominated	
Filmfare Awards South	12 July 2014	Best Supporting Actress – Tamil	Sai Dhanshika	Won	
Filmfare Awards South	12 July 2014	Best Music Director – Tamil	G. V. Prakash Kumar	Nominated	
Filmfare Awards South	12 July 2014	Best Lyricist – Tamil	Vairamuthu for "Sengaade"	Nominated	
Filmfare Awards South	12 July 2014	Best Female Playback Singer – Tamil	Vandana Srinivasan for "Avatha Paiyaa"	Nominated	
National Film Awards	3 May 2013	Best Costume Design	Poornima Ramaswamy	Won	
Norway Tamil Film Festival Awards	27 April 2014	Best Film	Bala	Won	
Norway Tamil Film Festival Awards	27 April 2014	Best Director	Bala	Won	
Norway Tamil Film Festival Awards	27 April 2014	Best Actor	Atharvaa	Won	
Norway Tamil Film Festival Awards	27 April 2014	Best Cinematographer	Chezhiyan	Won	
South Indian International Movie Awards	12–13 September 2014	Best Film – Tamil	Bala	Nominated	
South Indian International Movie Awards	12–13 September 2014	Best Director – Tamil	Bala	Won	
South Indian International Movie Awards	12–13 September 2014	Best Cinematographer – Tamil	Chezhiyan	Nominated	
South Indian International Movie Awards	12–13 September 2014	Best Actress in a Supporting Role – Tamil	Sai Dhanshika	Nominated	
South Indian International Movie Awards	12–13 September 2014	Best Film – Special Appreciation	Bala	Won	
Tamil Nadu State Film Awards	13 July 2017	Best Editor	L. V. K. Das	Won	
Tamil Nadu State Film Awards	13 July 2017	Best Art Director	C. S. Balachandar	Won	
Tamil Nadu State Film Awards	13 July 2017	Best Female Dubbing Artist	Divya	Won	
Techofes Awards	13 February 2014	Best Director	Bala	Won	
Techofes Awards	13 February 2014	Best Actor	Atharvaa	Won	
Techofes Awards	13 February 2014	Best Actress	Vedhika	Won	
Techofes Awards	13 February 2014	Best Music Director	G. V. Prakash Kumar	Won	
Techofes Awards	13 February 2014	Best Editor	Kishore Te	Won	
Vijay Awards	5 July 2014	Best Film	Bala	Nominated	
Vijay Awards	5 July 2014	Best Director	Bala	Won	
Vijay Awards	5 July 2014	Best Actor	Atharvaa	Nominated	
Vijay Awards	5 July 2014	Best Actress	Vedhika	Nominated	
Vijay Awards	5 July 2014	Best Supporting Actress	Sai Dhanshika	Won	
Vijay Awards	5 July 2014	Best Cinematographer	Chezhiyan	Nominated	
Vijay Awards	5 July 2014	Best Art Director	C. S. Balachandar	Nominated	
Vijay Awards	5 July 2014	Best Female Playback Singer	Vandana Srinivasan for "Avatha Paiyaa"	Nominated	
Vijay Awards	5 July 2014	Best Make Up Artistes	Dasarathan	Won	
Vijay Awards	5 July 2014	Best Costume Designer	Poornima Ramasamy and Perumal Selvam	Won	
Vijay Awards	5 July 2014	Favourite Director	Bala	Nominated	

== See also ==
- List of Tamil films of 2013
