= 11th Chennai International Film Festival =

Film festival edition

- Official poster
- Opening film: Like Father, Like Son
- Location: Chennai, India
- Founded: 2003
- Hosted by: Suhasini Maniratnam
- No. of films: 165
- Festival date: 12 December 2013 – 19 December 2013
- Website: chennaifilmfest.com

The 11th Chennai International Film Festival took place in Chennai, Tamil Nadu, India from 12 to 19 December 2013. The event was organised by the Indo Cine Appreciation Foundation (ICAF) with support from the Government of Tamil Nadu. The festival was curated by actress-director Suhasini Maniratnam and inaugurated by Kamal Haasan and Aamir Khan. The Japanese drama Like Father, Like Son marked the beginning of the fest.

Director Rakeysh Omprakash Mehra presided over the valedictory function and presented the awards. Thanga Meenkal, Haridas and Paradesi won the Tamil film competition and composer Anirudh Ravichander was awarded the newly instituted Amitabh Bachchan award for "Youth Icon of the Year".

== History ==
The Chennai International Film Festival (CIFF) was instituted in the year 2003 by the Indo Cine Appreciation Foundation (ICAF), a non-profit organisation. ICAF is a registered film society and works for the promotion of meaningful cinema by organising country centric festivals throughout the year by obtaining films from Embassies and Consulates, and has around 500 members, including film directors, cinematographers and technicians. In 2008, the Government of Tamil Nadu began supporting the event by sponsoring a part of it. The fest was reinvented in 2010 following the involvement of actor-director Suhasini which spiraled the direct involvement of film personalities in coordinating the fest. Later, when the funds raised through well-wishers were not substantial enough to support the event, the state government extended its support and financed the fest with a donation of ₹5 million (US$52,000). Since then, the government has been supporting the subsequent editions of the festival. The fest is conducted every year during the month of December.

The festival awards the best of Tamil cinema through a Tamil Feature Film Competition where 12 shortlisted films compete every year for the prize money of ₹ 6 lakh. Apart from awards for the Best Feature Film and the Second Best Feature Film, there is a Special Jury Award and a Film Buff Award, which is a web-based award given to the person who watches the maximum number of films and gives his own personalized account of the films watched.

== 11th CIFF ==
The 11th edition of the film festival was also organised by the ICAF. Emanadar Thangaraj, General Secretary of ICAF, invited actor-director Suhasini Maniratnam to curate the event. The fest was conducted between 12 and 19 December 2013 and a total of 165 films were screened in 8 screens across 5 venues. Presented by the national newspaper The Hindu and the Tamil satellite channel Pudhuyugam, the event saw the participation of 58 countries. The film festival celebrated the spirit of international cinema and the Centenary of Indian Cinema. Though the festival was supported by the state government, the funds were raised mainly through sponsorship and donations by celebrity volunteers. A specially designed poster was unveiled on 6 November 2013. An anthem song was set to tunes by Prakash Nikki. The lyrics was written by Rohini and sung by Andrea Jeremiah, Vallavan and Yuki. The song was used for promotional purpose and was released a day before the fest began.

As is the norm, the fest has a Tamil Feature Film Competition. In a press conference held on 6 November 2013, Thangaraj made the official announcement while the registration for the same began in early June 2013 with the last date being extended from 30 September to 15 November. Producers of Tamil films censored between 16 October 2012 and 15 October 2013 were invited to apply for the competition. The 11th edition also saw the institution of a new award, the 'Amitabh Bachchan Youth Icon Award', as a token of respect to Bachchan who graced the closing ceremony of the fest the previous year. Ironically though, the CIFF Documentary Contest that took place the previous year was absent.

=== Inauguration ===
Actress Shabana Azmi, who was expected to be present for the inaugural following an invite by Thangaraj, could not make her presence. The event was set in motion at around 5:30 PM on 12 December 2013 at Sir Mutha Venkata Subba Rao Concert Hall. The fest was inaugurated by Tamil actor-director Kamal Haasan and Bollywood actor-director-TV anchor Aamir Khan in the presence of celebrities including Mohanlal. Khan who resides at Mumbai attended the event in Chennai at his own expense following the example set by Amitabh Bachchan the previous year. A week prior to the inauguration, in a curtain-raiser interview to The Hindu, Khan emphasised the need for social commitment in films. Following the inauguration, in an open stage interaction with Suhasini, Haasan underlined the importance of script writing and was quoted saying "There are books, but books will not make cinema. Even Shakespeare will have to learn script-writing." In response to a question raised by singer S. P. Balasubrahmanyam on the need for qualified critics in censor board, Haasan also called for the film industry to take the responsibility of censoring films as he felt that those on the Censor Board were not qualified enough to do so. As part of his inaugural speech, Khan wished for a chain of theatres to showcase world cinema and Indian art-house films throughout the year claiming "these films do attract considerable audience."

The inauguration was compered by actress Abhirami and Ramya of the CIFF. The event began with poetry reading of select Tamil film songs by actresses Rohini and Poornima Bhagyaraj followed by a music session with performances by vocalist Karthik and pianist Anil Srinivasan, who rendered songs of Ilaiyaraja. As part of the event, dancers Shobana, Swarnamalya and their students presented thematic dance performances.

=== Main Event ===
The main event of the fest constitutes the screening of 165 films that includes 12 Tamil films as part of the Tamil Feature Film Competition, 17 films of Indian Panorama, and three documentaries, one each on Ellis R. Dungan, Gemini Ganesan and K. Subramanyam. The film festival featured retrospectives of Goran Paskaljevic from Serbia (seven films), Claire Denis from France (five films) and Istvan Szabo from Hungary (three films). The event also included a special section showcasing six films from contemporary Turkey apart from a country focus on Taiwan and Iran. The fest had a special focus on award-winning films from international film festivals like Cannes, Berlin and Venice some of which were screened. The venues for the screening were the Woodlands Multiplex (2 screens), Inox (2 screens), Abhirami Mega Mall (2 screens), Casino Theatre and Rani Seethai Hall.

Three documentary films were screened in a Special Section. An American in Madras is a documentary on American-Tamil film director Ellis R. Dungan. The documentary was the a result of a research by Karan Bali of Upperstall.com, a film website that focuses on classic and independent Indian cinema and its luminaries. The Tamil romantic-drama Kadhal Mannan is a documentary on veteran actor Gemini Ganesan, who was popularly known by the moniker 'Kadhal Mannan'. The third was a documentary on director K. Subramanyam titled He Swam Against the Colonial Current. The docu was made for the Public Service Broadcasting Trust (PSBT), New Delhi, by S. Krishnaswamy, Subrahmanyam's son.

The fest got rolling with the screening of the Hirokazu Koreeda directed Like Father, Like Son, the English remake rights of which have been bought by Steven Spielberg. The red carpet screenings include The Hunt, Walesa: Man of Hope, The Past, Omar, The Great Beauty and Harmony Lessons. Claudia Lacotte of Eye on Films, a France-based distribution company, addressed the film industry and aspiring filmmakers on the importance of circulating feature films across film festivals around the globe.

=== Forum Discussions ===
The event conducted three Forum Discussions, two in English and one in Tamil. The first of the three held at Inox, 'How to crowd fund your movie?' was moderated by filmmaker Alphonse Roy. Director Pawan Kumar who had directed the Kannada hit Lucia completely through crowd-funding and documentary filmmaker Amudhan R.P., discussed the possibility and ways of crowd-funding a film project. Rohini and independent filmmaker-journalist-film critic Sudhish Kamath also participated in the lively discussion. In another discussion on 'Women behind Cinema' moderated by Suhasini, the panel, including female producers and entrepreneurs Pushpa Kandasamy of Kavithalayaa Productions, Archana Kalpathi of AGS Cinemas, Sitara Suresh and Nivedha Priyadarshini discussed the difficulties faced by women filmmakers and technicians. The third forum also held at Inox titled 'Realising Novel Ideas Successfully' discussed bringing novel ideas to films. The team behind Naduvula Konjam Pakkatha Kaanom along with writer-filmmaker Amshan Kumar, Gautami and Sudhish Kamath took part where the question of 'why do we make films?' cropped up. Suhasini quoted Walt Disney saying "We don't make movies to make money. We make money to make more movies."

Excluding the aforementioned, 'Cinema of Cruelty', a discussion on Tamil cinema, pondered over the excessive violence found in Tamil films and its influences, citing that Paruthiveeran and Subramaniapuram started the trend inspiring even acclaimed filmmaker Anurag Kashyap to make a film like Gangs of Wasseypur.

=== Reception ===
The Great Beauty Parviz Walesa: A Man of Hope The Hunt Blue Is The Warmest Colour Omar Midhunam Like Father, Like Son

=== Jury ===
The jury members for the Tamil feature film competition was introduced by Rohini. The jury was headed by producer-director R. V. Udayakumar and constitutes actor-director Sripriya and prominent writer S. Ramakrishnan. Twelve films were short listed from a total of 17 entries.

=== Closing ceremony ===
The 8-day film festival came to a close on 19 December 2013. The closing ceremony was held at Sir Mutha Venkata Subba Rao Concert Hall. While Mohanlal was reported to be one of the chief guests of the evening, he skipped it having made it to the inauguration. Director Rakeysh Omprakash Mehra was the sole chief guest. The closing was anchored by Karthi and Anu Hasan. Following a live concert by composer Anirudh Ravichander, the chief guest handed over the various awards. Thanga Meenkal and Haridas won the first and second place in the Tamil Competition while its child actors won the newly instituted award for Best Child Artistes. The Special Jury Award for Individual Excellence was presented to Adharvaa for his performance in Paradesi. Anirudh won the maiden Amitabh Bachchan award for Youth Icon of the year. The winner of the Online Film Buff Award was announced as Pavithran Sivam through their Facebook page.

== Promotion ==
The organisers decided to get the city involved in the event. Suhasini says, "That’s when we decided to stage a flash mob. This year, we also have Zumba. We have festival tees, student volunteers, more cinema halls, and several stars." In a move to publicise the fest among the public, the organisers held flash mob dances and Zumba by the beach. On 11 December 2013, a day before the event began, dancers from the professional dance group 'The S Community of Entertainment', created a flash mob at the atrium of Express Avenue. They were joined by Vijay Sethupathi, Jayam Ravi, Suhasini, etc. for the five-minute performance. During the after-party following the inauguration, professional dancers who were rehearsing Zumba was joined by the Khan, Mohanlal, Suhasini and a few more who would perform later. On the morning of 15 December, a set was erected at the Schmidt Memorial, Besant Nagar Beach and Zumba was performed by celebrities including Suhasini, Anita Ratnam, Shanthanu Bhagyaraj, VJ Ramya Subramaniam, Ashok Kumar, Maanu and Abhirami.

== Screenings ==
=== Retrospectives ===
Retrospective of Goran Paskaljevic

S. No	English Title	Original Title (Year)	Language	Director	Country	Venue	Date & Time
1	Beach Guard in Winter	Čuvar plaže u zimskom periodu (1976)	Serbo-Croatian	Goran Paskaljevic	Yugoslavia	Woodlands Symphony	16, 10:45 AM
2	Special Treatment	Poseban tretman (1980)	Serbo-Croatian	Goran Paskaljevic	Yugoslavia	Inox 3	15, 11 AM
3	When Day Breaks	Kad svane dan (2012)	Serbian	Goran Paskaljevic	Serbia	Woodlands Symphony	13, 1:45 PM
4	Cabaret Balkan	Bure baruta (1998)	Serbian	Goran Paskaljevic	Yugoslavia	Inox 3	18, 11 AM
5		How Harry Became a Tree (2001)	English	Goran Paskaljevic	Italy; France; UK	Woodlands Symphony	18, 10:45 AM
6	Midwinter Night’s Dream	San zimske noci (2004)	Serbian	Goran Paskaljevic	Serbia; Montenegro	Inox 3	19, 4:30 PM
7	Honeymoons	Medeni mesec (2009)	Serbian; Albanian	Goran Paskaljevic	Serbia; Albania	Woodlands Symphony	17, 1:45 PM

Retrospective of István Szabó

S. No	English Title	Original Title (Year)	Language	Director	Country	Venue	Date & Time
8	The Door	Az ajtó (2012)	English	István Szabó	Hungary	Woodlands Symphony	15, 6:45 PM
9	Sweet Emma, Dear Böbe – Sketches, Nudes	Édes Emma, drága Böbe - vázlatok, aktok (1992)	Hungarian	István Szabó	Hungary	Woodlands Symphony	16, 4:15 PM
10	Budapest Tales	Budapesti mesék (1976)	Hungarian	István Szabó	Hungary	Rani Seethai Hall	19, 11 AM

Retrospective of Claire Denis

S. No	English Title	Original Title (Year)	Language	Director	Country	Venue	Date & Time
11	No Fear, No Die	S'en fout la mort (1990)	French	Claire Denis	France	Woodlands Symphony	18, 1:45 PM
12	Good Work	Beau Travail (1999)	French; Italian; Russian	Claire Denis	France	Woodlands Symphony	17, 10:45 AM
13		Trouble Every Day (2001)	French; English	Claire Denis	France	Woodlands Symphony	14, 10:45 AM
14	The Intruder	L'intrus (2004)	French	Claire Denis	France	Woodlands Symphony	13, 10:45 AM
15	35 Shots of Rum	35 Rhums (2008)	French; German	Claire Denis	France; Germany	Woodlands Symphony	16, 1:45 PM

=== World Cinema ===
S. No	English Title	Original Title (Year)	Language	Director	Country	Venue	Date & Time
16	Young & Beautiful	Jeune & Jolie (2013)	French	François Ozon	France	Woodlands	15, 7 PM
17		Salvo (2013)	Italian	Fabio Grassadonia; Antonio Piazza	France; Italy	Casino	16, 4:30 PM
18		Suzanne (2013)	French	Katell Quillévéré	France	Casino	17, 11 AM
19		My Sweet Pepper Land (2013)	Kurdish	Huner Saleem	France; Germany; Iraq	Inox 3	18, 2 PM
20	Six Acts	Shesh Peamim	Hebrew	Jonathan Gurfinkel	Israel	Woodlands	19, 11 AM
21	Harmony Lessons	Uroki garmonii (2013)	Kazakh; Russian	Emir Baighazin	France; Germany; Kazakhstan	Woodlands	19, 2 PM
22		Cheap Thrills (2013)	English	E.L. Katz	USA	Swarna Sakthi Abirami	14, 11 AM
23	The Missing Picture	L'image manquante (2013)	French	Rithy Panh	Cambodia; France	Inox 3	18, 4:30 PM
24	The German Doctor	Wakolda (2013)	Spanish	Lucía Puenzo	Argentina / France / Spain / Norway	Inox 3	17, 11 AM
25	Little Lion	Comme un lion (2012)	French	Samuel Collardey	France	Swarna Sakthi Abirami	14, 2 PM
26		12 Ans D'âge (2013)	French	Frédéric Proust	France	Casino	14, 4:30 PM
27	The Amazing Catfish	Los insólitos peces gato (2013)	Spanish	Claudia Sainte-Luce	Mexico	Woodlands	18, 11 AM
28	Two Mothers	Zwei Mütter (2013)	German	Anne Zohra Berrached	Germany	Woodlands	16, 7 PM
29	What They Don't Talk About When They Talk About Love	Yang tidak dibicarakan ketika membicarakan cinta (2013)	Indonesian	Mouly Surya	Indonesia	Woodlands	17, 2 PM
30	The Eternal Return of Antonis Paraskevas	I aionia epistrofi tou Antoni Paraskeua (2013)	Greek	Elina Psikou	Greece	Inox 2	14, 1:45 PM
31	The Major	Mayor (2013)	Russian	Yuri Bykov	Russia	Robot Bala Abirami	13, 4:15 PM
32	Coming Forth by Day	Al-khoroug lel-nahar (2012)	Arabic	Hala Lotfy	Egypt	Inox 2	17, 1:45 PM
33	After the Battle	Baad el Mawkeaa (2012)	Arabic	Yousry Nasrallah	Egypt	Rani Seethai Hall	18, 11 AM
34	Chaos, Disorder	Harag W' Marag (2012)	Arabic	Nadine Khan	Egypt	Rani Seethai Hall	19, 2 PM
35	Chinese Zodiac	CZ12 (2012)		Jackie Chan	China; Hong Kong	Rani Seethai Hall	12, 2PM
36	A Simple Life	Tao jie (2012)	Cantonese	Ann Hui	Hong Kong	Rani Seethai Hall	13, 7 PM
37	Back to 1942	Yi jiu si er (2012)	Mandarin	Xiaogang Feng	China	Rani Seethai Hall	17, 11 AM
38	The Old Man	Shal (2012)	Kazakh	Ermek Tursunov	Kazakhstan	Woodlands Symphony	12, 10:45 AM
39	—	Don Jon (2013)	English	Joseph Gordon-Levitt	USA	Robot Bala Abirami	15, 10:45 AM
40	—	Mystery Road (2013)	English	Ivan Sen	Australia	Woodlands Symphony	13, 6:45 PM
41	90 Minutes	90 minutter (2012)	Norwegian	Eva Sørhaug	Norway	Woodlands	13, 11 AM
42	The Tree and the Swing	To dentro kai i kounia (2013)	Greek	Maria Douza	Greece	Robot Bala Abhirami	17, 4:15 PM
43		Fynbos (2012)	English	Harry Patramanis	South Africa; Greece; USA	Casino	19, 11 AM
44	Tangerines	Mandariinid (2013)	Russian	Zaza Urushadze	Estonia; Georgia	Robot Bala Abirami	14, 1:45 PM
45	A Stranger	Obrana i zastita (2013)	Croatian; Bosnian	Bobo Jelcic	Croatia; Bosnia and Herzegovina	Inox 2	14, 6:45 PM
46	The Bag of Flour	Le sac de farine (2012)	Arabic; French	Kadija Leclere	Belgium, Morocco, and France	Robot Bala Abirami	13, 6:45 PM
47	The Past	Le Passé (2013)	French; Persian	Asghar Farhadi	France; Iran	Woodlands	18, 2 PM
48		Olli (2013)	Tamil	P. Rameesh	Malaysia	Inox 3	16, 2 PM
49	How to Describe a Cloud	(2013)		David Verbeek	Netherlands	Robot Bala Abirami	13, 1:45 PM
50	Something in the Way	(2013)	Indonesian	Teddy Soeriaatmadja	Indonesia	Casino	13, 11 AM
51	Like Father, Like Son	Soshite chichi ni naru (2013)	Japanese	Hirokazu Koreeda	Japan	Casino	14, 2 PM
52	The Whirl	Vir (2012)	Serbian	Bojan Vuk Kosovcevic	Serbia	Woodlands	13, 4:30 PM
53	—	Illusion (2013)	German	Roland Reber	Germany	Inox 2	17, 6:45 PM
54	Walesa. Man of Hope	Walesa. Czlowiek z nadziei (2013)	Polish	Andrzej Wajda	Poland	Woodlands	17, 7 PM
55	Life Feels Good	Chce sie zyc (2013)	Polish	Maciej Pieprzyca	Poland	Swarna Sakthi Abirami	15, 11 AM
56	A Long and Happy Life	Dolgaya schastlivaya zhizn (2013)	Russian	Boris Khlebnikov	Russia	Woodlands	15, 11 AM
57	Rock the Casbah	Rock Ba-Casba (2012)	Hebrew	Yariv Horowitz	Israel/France	Robot Bala Abirami	18, 10:45 AM
58	Floating Skyscrapers	Plynace wiezowce (2013)	Polish	Tomasz Wasilewski	Poland	Robot Bala Abirami	19, 1:45 PM
59	Roa	(2013)	Spanish	Andrés Baiz	Colombia	Casino	19, 2 PM
60		El Mudo (2013)	Spanish	Daniel Vega Vidal; Diego Vega Vidal	Peru; France; Mexico	Swarna Sakthi Abirami	17, 11 AM
61	Stray Dogs	Jiao you (2013)	Mandarin	Tsai Ming-liang	Taiwan; France	Woodlands	14, 2 PM
62	Mother, I Love You	Mammu, es tevi mīlu (2013)	Latvian	Jānis Nords	Latvia	Swarna Sakthi Abirami	16, 11 AM
63	Cannibal Vegetarian	Ljudožder vegetarijanac (2012)	Croatian	Branko Schmidt	Croatia	Inox 3	14, 2 PM
64	Fatal Sin	Pecado Fatal (2013)	Portuguese	Luís Diogo	Portugal	Casino	13, 7 PM
65	The Future	Il Futuro (2013)	Italian; Spanish; English	Alicia Scherson	Chile; Germany; Italy; Spain	Woodlands Symphony	17, 4:15 PM
66		XL (2013)	Icelandic	Marteinn Thorsson	Iceland	Rani Seethai Hall	13, 11 AM
67	Spooks and Spirits	Ófeigur gengur aftur (2013)	Icelandic	Ágúst Guðmundsson	Iceland	Rani Seethai Hall	15, 7 PM
68	Rock Bottom	Þetta Reddast (2013)	Icelandic	Börkur Gunnarsson	Iceland	Woodlands Symphony	17, 6:45 PM
69	Ferox	Falskur Fugl (2013)	Icelandic	Thor Omar Jonsson	Iceland	Woodlands Symphony	19, 10:45 AM
70	A Coffee in Berlin	Oh Boy! (2012)	German; English	Jan-Ole Gerster	Germany	Woodlands Symphony	13, 4:15 PM
71	The Wild Ones	Els nens salvatges (2012)	Spanish	Patricia Ferreira	Spain	Swarna Sakthi Abirami	15, 4:30 PM
72	A Touch of Sin	Tian Zhu Ding (2013)	Mandarin	Zhangke Jia	China	Swarna Sakthi Abirami	17, 7 PM
73	Ken & Mary: The Asian Truck Express	Ken to Merî: Ame-agari no yozora ni (2013)	Japanese	Kenta Fukasaku	Japan	Swarna Sakthi Abirami	18, 11 AM
74	The Shooter	Skytten (2013)	Danish	Annette K. Olesen	Denmark	Casino	14, 7 PM
75	The Hunt	Jagten (2013)	Danish	Thomas Vinterberg	Denmark	Woodlands	16, 2 PM
76	Northwest	Nordvest (2013)	Danish	Michael Noer	Denmark	Swarna Sakthi Abirami	19, 2 PM
77	The Cleaner	El limpiador (2013)	Spanish	Adrián Saba	Peru	Robot Bala Abirami	16, 1:45 PM
78	The Photograph	Zdjecie (2012)	Polish	Maciej Adamek	Poland	Casino	15, 11 AM
79	If Only	Sana Dati (2013)	Filipino	Jerrold Tarog	Philippines	Casino	16, 11 AM
80	The Girl and Death	Het Meisje en de Dood (2012)	Russian; German; French	Jos Stelling	Dutch	Casino	17, 4:30 PM
81	—	Let Me Survive (2013)	English	Eduardo Rossoff	Belgium; France	Inox 3	15, 4:30 PM
82	Arrest Me	Arrêtez-moi (2013)	French	Jean-Paul Lilienfeld	France	Robot Bala Abirami	16, 6:45 PM
83	Blue Is the Warmest Colour	La Vie d'Adèle (2013)	French	Abdellatif Kechiche	France	Casino	18, 7 PM
84	Jonathas' Forest	A Floresta de Jonathas (2012)	Portuguese	Sergio Andrade	Brazil	Robot Bala Abirami	18, 4:15 PM
85	The Priest's Children	Svecenikova djeca (2013)	Croatian	Vinko Brešan	Croatia; Serbia	Swarna Sakthi Abirami	19, 11 AM
86	Cold Bloom	Sakura namiki no mankai no shita ni (2012)	Japanese	Atsushi Funahashi	Japan	Inox 3	17, 2 PM
87	Tricked	Steekspel (2012)	Dutch; English	Paul Verhoeven	Netherlands	Robot Bala Abirami	19, 10:45 AM
88	Fill the Void	Lemale et ha'halal (2012)	Hebrew	Rama Burshtein	Israel	Casino	17, 2 PM
89	Waiting for the Sea	V ozhidanii morya (2012)	Russian	Bakhtyar Khudojnazarov	Russia; Belgium; France; Kazakhstan; Germany	Woodlands	14, 7 PM
90	Trapped	Darband (2013)	Persian	Parviz Shahbazi	Iran	Swarna Sakthi Abirami	13, 2 PM
91	—	Puppylove (2013)	French	Delphine Lehericey	Belgium; Switzerland; France; Luxembourg	Woodlands	15, 2 PM
92	Black Diamonds	Diamantes negros (2013)	Spanish	Miguel Alcantud	Spain; Portugal	Swarna Sakthi Abirami	16, 2 PM
93	—	Errata (2012)	Spanish	Iván Vescovo	Argentina	Casino	17, 7 PM
94	Inertia	Inercia (2013)	Spanish	Isabel Muñoz Cota Callejas	Mexico	Woodlands	17, 11 AM
95	Club Sandwich	Club Sándwich (2013)	Spanish	Fernando Eimbcke	Mexico	Robot Bala Abirami	17, 10:45 AM
96	—	No (2012)	Spanish	Pablo Larraín	Chile; USA; France; Mexico	Robot Bala Abirami	16, 4:15 PM
97	The Last Floor	Ostatnie pietro (2013)	Polish	Tadeusz Król	Poland	Inox 2	14, 10:45 AM
98	Secrets of Love	Sekrety milosci (2013)	French; Russian; Polish	Krystian Matysek	Poland	Robot Bala Abirami	14, 6:45 PM
99	Disciple	Lärjungen (2013)	Swedish	Ulrika Bengts	Finland	Woodlands	12, 11 AM
100	—	Lincoln (2012)	English	Steven Spielberg	USA	Inox 2	13, 6:45 PM
101	In Bloom	Grzeli nateli dgeebi (2013)	Georgian	Nana Ekvtimishvili	Germany; France; Georgia	Casino	18, 11 AM
102	—	Ilo Ilo (2013)	Mandarin; English; Tagalog	Anthony Chen	Singapore	Robot Bala Abirami	18, 6:45 PM
103	Another House	L'autre maison (2013)	English; French	Mathieu Roy	Canada	Casino	15, 4:30 PM
104	The Great Beauty	La Grande Bellezza (2013)	Italian	Paolo Sorrentino	Italy; France	Woodlands	18, 7 PM
105	Feed Me with Your Words	Nahrani me z besedami (2012)	Slovenian; Italian	Martin Turk	Slovenia	Robot Bala Abirami	14, 10:45 AM
106	My Name Is Viola	(2013)	Armenian	Ruben Kochar	Armenia; USA	Woodlands Symphony	16, 6:45 PM
107	—	White Lie (2013)	English	Nyima Cartier	UK; France	Swarna Sakthi Abirami	15, 2 PM
108	—	Omar (2013)	Hebrew	Hany Abu-Assad	Palestine	Woodlands	18, 4:30 PM
109	Before Snowfall	Før snøen faller (2013)	Kurdish	Hisham Zaman	Norway; Germany; Iraq	Inox 3	16, 4:30 PM
110	—	Chambaili (2013)	Urdu	Ismail Jilani	Pakistan	Woodlands Symphony	14, 6:45 PM

=== Country Focus: Taiwan ===
S. No	English Title	Original Title (Year)	Language	Director	Venue	Date & Time
111	Blue Brave: The Legend of Formosa in 1895	1895 (2008)	Mandarin; Japanese; Hakka	Chih-yu Hung	Rani Seethai Hall	12, 11 AM
112	Orz Boyz	Jiong nan hai (2008)	Mandarin; Min Nan	Ya Che Yang	Rani Seethai Hall	19, 4:30 PM
113	10 plus 10			20 directors	Inox 3	14, 11 AM
114	Night Market Hero	Ji pai ying xiong (2011)	Min Nan	Tien-Lun Yeh	Rani Seethai Hall	17, 7 PM
115	—	Yang Yang (2009)	Mandarin; French	Yu-Chieh Cheng	Rani Seethai Hall	14, 7 PM

=== Country Focus: Iran ===
S. No	English Title	Original Title (Year)	Language	Director	Venue	Date & Time
116	The Green Umbrella	Chatr-e Sabz (2013)	Persian	Nasser Refaie	Inox 2	19, 10:45 AM
117	Hush! Girls Don't Scream	Hiss... Dohktar-ha Faryad Nemi-Zanand (2013)	Persian	Pouran Derakhshandeh	Woodlands Symphony	12, 1:45 PM
118	Berlin - 7		Persian	Ramtin Lavafipour	Inox 2	18, 6;45 PM
119	—	Parviz (2012)	Persian	Majid Barzegar	Woodlands	17, 4:30 PM
120	Reclamation	Esterdad (2013)	Persian	Ali Ghaffari	Woodlands Symphony	15, 4:15 PM
121	Sunlight, Moonlight, Earth	Aftab, Mahtab, Zamin (2013)	Persian	Ali Ghavitan	Inox 2	17, 4:15 PM

=== Contemporary Films: Turkey ===
S. No	English Title	Original Title (Year)	Language	Director	Country	Venue	Date & Time
122	Thou Gild'st the Even	Sen Aydinlatirsin Geceyi (2013)	Turkish	Onur Ünlü	Turkey	Robot Bala Abirami	18, 1:45 PM
123	The Circle Within	Icimdeki Cember (2013)	Turkish	Deniz Çinar	Turkey	Inox 2	18, 4:15 PM
124	Love Me	Sev Beni (2013)	English; Russian; Ukrainian; Turkish	Maryna Gorbach; Mehmet Bahadir Er	Turkey; Ukraine	Swarna Sakthi Abirami	16, 4:30 PM
125	Jin	Jîn (2013)	Turkish; Kurdish	Reha Erdem	Turkey	Casino	16, 7 PM
126	Strangers in the House	Evdeki Yabancilar (2012)	Turkish	Dilek Keser, Ulas Gunes Kacargil	Turkey	Inox 3	13, 2 PM
127	Mold	Küf (2012)	Turkish	Ali Aydin	Turkey; Germany	Woodlands	14, 11 AM

=== Eye on Films ===
S. No	English Title	Original Title (Year)	Language	Director	Country	Venue	Date & Time
128	House with a Turret	Dom s bashenkoy (2012)	Russian	Eva Neymann	Ukraine	Woodlands Symphony	19, 1:45 PM
129	Snails in the Rain	Shablulim Ba'geshem (2013)	Hebrew	Yariv Mozer	Israel	Inox 2	18, 10:45 AM
130	Water			A film by 7 Directors	Israel, Palestine	Swarna Sakthi Abirami	18, 4:30 PM
131	Jo's Neighbourhood	Un p'tit gars de Ménilmontant (2013)	French	Alain Minier	France	Woodlands	13, 2 PM
132	Arrows of the Thunder Dragon	(2014)	Dzongkha	Greg Sneddon	Bhutan; Australia	Inox 2	17, 10:45 AM
133	—	Hide Your Smiling Faces (2013)	English	Daniel Patrick Carbone	USA	Robot Bala Abhirami	15, 4:15 PM

=== Indian Panorama ===
S. No	Original Title (Year)	Language	Director	Venue	Date & Time
134	Ajanata Batas (2013)	Bengali	Anjan Das	Inox 3	16, 11 AM
135	Astu	Marathi	Sumitra Bhave–Sunil Sukthankar	Inox 2	15, 1:45 PM
136	Baga Beach (2013)	Konkani	Laxmikant Shetgaonkar	Woodlands Symphony	15, 10:45 AM
137	Jal (2011)	Hindi	Girish Malik	Robot Bala Abirami	15, 6:45 PM
138	Ko:Yad	Mising	Manju Borah	Woodlands Symphony	15, 1:45 PM
139	Sala Budha (2012)	Oriya	Sabyasachi Mohapatra	Robot Bala Abirami	17, 1:45 PM
140	Ship of Theseus (2013)	English/Hindi	Anand Gandhi	Robot Bala Abirami	17, 6:45 PM
141	Tapaal	Marathi	Laxman Utekar	Robot Bala Abirami	16, 10:45 AM
142	Bhaag Milkha Bhaag (2013)	Hindi	Rakeysh Omprakash Mehra	Swarna Sakthi Abirami	16, 7 PM
143	Kanyaka Talkies (2014)	Malayalam	K. R. Manoj		
144	Barefoot to Goa (2013)	Hindi	Praveen Morchhale	Inox 2	16, 10:45 AM
145	Munsif	Kannada	Umashankar Swamy	Woodlands Symphony	14, 4:15 PM
146	Not a Fairy Tale; Rupkatha Noy (2013)	Bengali	Atanu Ghosh	Inox 2	15, 10:45 AM
147	Sringhal	Assamese	Prabin Hazarika	Woodlands Symphony	18, 4:15 PM
148	101 Chodyangal (2013)	Malayalam	Sidhartha Siva	Woodlands Symphony	18, 6:45 PM
149	Lucia (2013)	Kannada	Pawan Kumar	Inox 2	16, 4:15 PM
150	Midhunam (2012)	Telugu	Tanikella Bharani	Woodlands Symphony	14, 1:45 PM

=== Tamil Competition ===
S. No	Original Title (Year)	Director	Venue	Date & Time
151	Aadhalal Kadhal Seiveer (2013)	Suseenthiran	Rani Seethai Hall	18, 4:30 PM
152	6 Melugu Vathigal (2013)	V. Z. Durai	Rani Seethai Hall	17, 4:30 PM
153	Annakodi (2013)	Bharathiraja	Rani Seethai Hall	14, 2 PM
154	Haridas (2013)	G.N.R.Kumaravelan	Rani Seethai Hall	13, 2 PM
155	Kumki (2012)	Prabhu Solomon	Rani Seethai Hall	15, 4:30 PM
156	Maryan (2013)	Bharat Bala	Rani Seethai Hall	17, 2 PM
157	Moodar Koodam (2013)	Naveen	Rani Seethai Hall	16, 7 PM
158	Moondru Per Moondru Kadal (2013)	Vasanth	Rani Seethai Hall	13, 4:30 PM
159	Paradesi (2013)	Bala	Rani Seethai Hall	14, 4:30 PM
160	Ponmaalai Pozhudhu (2013)	AC Durai	Rani Seethai Hall	18, 7 PM
161	Soodhu Kavvum (2013)	Nalan Kumarasamy	Rani Seethai Hall	16, 4:30 PM
162	Thanga Meenkal (2013)	Ram	Rani Seethai Hall	15, 2 PM

=== Special Screening ===
S. No	Original Title	Language	Director	Country	Venue	Date & Time
163	An American in Madras	English; Tamil; Hindi	Karan Bali	India	Rani Seethai Hall	14, 11 AM
164	Kaadhal Mannan	Tamil	Ashok Kumar	India	Rani Seethai Hall	15, 11 AM
165	He Swam Against the Colonial Current; Documentary on K. Subrahmanyam	Tamil	Dr. S. Krishnaswamy	India	Rani Seethai Hall	16, 11 AM

== Awards ==
- Best Feature Film: Thanga Meenkal (₹ 1 lakh each for producer and director)
- Second Best Feature Film: Haridas (₹ 1 lakh each for producer and director)
- Special Jury Award: Adharvaa for Paradesi
- Amitabh Bachchan Youth Icon of the Year: Anirudh Ravichander
- Best Child Artistes: Sadhana for Thanga Meenkal and Prithiviraj Das for Haridas
- Online Film Buff Award: Pavithran Sivam

== Sponsors ==
The event, jointly presented by The Hindu and Pudhuyugam, was sponsored by the South India Shelters Pvt Ltd (SIS) with Foams India being the associate sponsor. Other sponsors were Qube Cinema Network, Real Image Technologies (award sponsor), PVP Cinema, TVS, Madras Talkies, Indian Overseas Bank, The Savera, Gamesa, Hot Breads, Tripadam Logistics, Casino Theatre, Woodlands Multiplex, Inox, Abirami Mega Mall, Nithra, IndiaGlitz, Rani Seethai Hall, Fingrid, Deco aro, Ticket New, Reliance Entertainment, Institut Français, Goethe-Institut.
