= 49th International Film Festival of India =

Indian film festival in 2018

- Opening film: The Aspern Papers
- Closing film: Sealed Lips
- Location: Goa, India
- Founded: 1952
- Awards: Golden Peacock Award (Donbass); Lifetime achievement Award (Dan Wolman)
- Hosted by: Sophie Choudry; Arjan Bajwa; Amit Sadh; Mandira Bedi
- Festival date: 20–28 November 2018
- Website: iffigoa.org

International Film Festival of India
- 50th 48th

The 49th International Film Festival of India was held from 20 to 28 November 2018 in Goa. In the 49th edition of the festival, new sections such as "Sketch on Screen (Animation Film Package)", "A Retrospective of Masters" were inculcated. 212 films were showcased during the event, with Israel being the country of focus.

== Winners ==
- Golden Peacock (Best Film): Donbass by Sergei Loznitsa
- IFFI Best Director Award: Lijo Jose Pellissery for Ee.Ma.Yau
- IFFI Best Actor Award (Male): Silver Peacock Award: Chemban Vinod Jose for Ee.Ma.Yau
- IFFI Best Actor Award (Female): Silver Peacock Award: Anastasiia Pustovit for When the Trees Fall
- IFFI ICFT UNESCO Gandhi Medal: Praveen Morchhale for Walking With the Wind
- IFFI Best Debut Director Award: Treb Monteras II for Respeto
- Silver Peacock Special Jury Award: Milko Lazarov for "Ága"
- Special Mention: Chezhiyan for To Let (India)

== Special awards ==
- Life Time Achievement Award - Dan Wolman
- IFFI Indian Film Personality of the Year Award: Salim Khan

== Official Selections ==
=== Opening Film ===
- The Aspern Papers

=== Closing Film ===
- Sealed Lips

=== International Competition ===
Original title	Director(s)	Production country
53 Wars	Ewa Bukowska	Poland
A Translator	Sebastian Barriusco	Cuba, Canada, Spanish, Russia
Aga	Milko Lazarov	Bulgaria, Germany, France
Divine Wind	Merzak Allouache	Algeria, France, Qatar, Lebanon
Donbass	Sergey Loznitsa	Germany, Ukraine, France, Netherlands, Romania
A Family Tour	Ying Liang	Taiwan, Hong Kong, Singapore, Malaysia
Here	Hadi Mohaghegh	Iran
Our Struggles	Guillaume Senez	Belgium, France
The Manslayer/The Virgin/The Shadow	Sulev Keedus	Estonia, Lithuania
The Unseen	Nicholas Pueno	Argentina
Vang Goghs	Sergey Livnev	Russia
When The Trees Fall	Marysia Nikitiuk	Ukraine, Poland
Ee.Ma.Yau	Lijo Jose Pellissery	India-Malayalam
To Let	Chezhiyan	India-Tamil
Bhayanakam	Jayaraj	India-Malayalam

=== Indian Panorama ===
Title	Language	Director(s)
Olu	Malayalam - Inaugural film	Shaji N Karun
Sa	Bengali	Arijit Singh
Bunkar - The Last of the Varanasi Weavers	English with Hindi	Satyaprakash Upadhyay
Nagarkirtan	Bengali	Kaushik Ganguly
Uma	Bengali	Srijit Mukherjee
Abyakto	Bengali	Arjun Dutta
Somoy	Bengali	Suryoday De
Uronchodi	Bengali	Abhishek Saha
October	Hindi	Shoojit Sircar
Bhor	Hindi	Kamakhya Narayanan Singh
Sinjar	Jasari	Pampally
Walking with the Wind	Ladakhi	Praveen Morchhale
Bhayanakam	Malayalam	Jayaraj
Makanna	Malayalam	Raheem Khader
Poomaram	Malayalam	Abrid Shine
Sudani From Nigeria	Malayalam	Zakariya
Ee.Ma.Yau	Malayalam	Lijo Jose Pellissery
Dhappa	Marathi	Nipun Avinash Dharmadhikari
Aamhi Doghi	Marathi	Pratima Joshi
To Let	Tamil	Chezhiyan
Baaram	Tamil	Priya Krishnaswamy
Pariyerum Perumal	Tamil	Mari Selvaraj
Peranbu	Tamil	Ram
Paddayi	Tulu	Abhaya Simha

=== State Focus - Jharkhand (Special Section) ===
Title	Language	Director(s)
A Death in the Gunj	Hindi	Konkona Sen Sharma
M.S. Dhoni: The Untold Story	Hindi	Neeraj Pandey
Panchlait	Hindi	Prem Prakash Modi
Begum Jaan	Hindi	Srijit Mukherji

=== Mainstream Cinema Section ===
Title	Language	Director(s)
Mahanati	Telugu	Nag Ashwin
Tiger Zinda Hai	Hindi	Ali Abbas Zafar
Padmaavat	Hindi	Sanjay Leela Bhansali
Raazi	Hindi	Meghna Gulzar

== Controversy ==
On 22 November 2018 delegates who had gathered to watch the Danish crime thriller The Guilty began protesting at Kala Academy when they were not allowed to enter the theater. This led to a clash between them and the organizers. In the resulting argument, Rajendra Talak, vice-chairman of the Entertainment Society of Goa (ESG), was quoted as asking delegates from Kerala to "go back home". A complaint was filed by Kerala-based director Kamal KM to IFFI CEO, Ameya Abhyankar. Following this, 29 other Malayali delegates, including 11 National Film winners like Dileesh Pothen and Dr Biju, signed a petition requesting a formal apology from Talak. When asked to comment, Talak replied that he had told the delegates to go back as the show was housefull.
