= Kangani =

Kangani may refer to:

- Kangani, Anjouan, a village in the Comoros
- Kangani, Mayotte, a village on Mayotte
- Kangani, Mohéli, a town in the Comoros
- Kangani system, a form of labour recruitment and management
