= Vijay Award for Best Actress =

Indian film award

The Vijay Award for Best Actress is given by STAR Vijay, an Indian TV channel, as part of its annual Vijay Awards ceremony for Tamil (Kollywood) films. The award in this category was given from the second ceremony onwards.

== Winners ==
Year	Actress	Film
2017	Nayanthara	Aramm
2014	Amala Paul	Velaiyilla Pattathari
2013	Nayanthara	Raja Rani
2012	Samantha Ruth Prabhu	Neethane En Ponvasantham
2011	Anjali	Engaeyum Eppothum
2010	Anjali	Angadi Theru
2009	Pooja Umashanker	Naan Kadavul
2008	Sneha	Pirivom Santhippom
2007	Priyamani	Paruthiveeran

== Multiple wins ==
The following individuals have received two or more Best Actress awards:

Wins	Actress
2	Anjali; Nayanthara

== Winners and nominations ==
- 2007 Priyamani – Paruthiveeran
  - Asin – Pokkiri
  - Bhavana – Deepavali
  - Jyothika – Mozhi
  - Padmapriya – Mirugam
- 2008 Sneha – Pirivom Santhippom
  - Asin – Dasavathaaram
  - Parvathy Thiruvothu – Poo
  - Genelia D'Souza – Santosh Subramaniam
- 2009 Pooja Umashanker – Naan Kadavul
  - Padmapriya – Pokkisham
  - Sindhu Menon – Eeram
  - Tamannaah Bhatia – Kandein Kadhalai
  - Vega Tamotia – Pasanga
- 2010 Anjali – Angadi Theru
  - Amala Paul – Mynaa
  - Reema Sen – Aayirathil Oruvan
  - Aishwarya Rai – Ravanan
  - Trisha – Vinnaithaandi Varuvaayaa
- 2011 Anjali – Engaeyum Eppothum
  - Nithya Menen – Nootrenbadhu
  - Anushka Shetty – Deiva Thirumagal
  - Iniya – Vaagai Sooda Vaa
  - Richa Gangopadhyay – Mayakkam Enna
- 2012 Samantha Ruth Prabhu – Neethane En Ponvasantham
  - Kajal Aggarwal - Thuppakki
  - Shruti Haasan - 3
  - Sunaina - Neerparavai
  - Viji Chandrasekhar - Aarohanam
- 2013 Nayanthara – Raja Rani
  - Parvathy Thiruvothu - Maryan
  - Pooja Umashanker - Vidiyum Munn
  - Sneha - Haridas
  - Vedhicka - Paradesi
- 2014 Amala Paul – Velaiyilla Pattathari
  - Nithya Menen - Malini 22 Palayamkottai
  - Lakshmi Menon - Naan Sigappu Manithan
  - Sridivya - Jeeva
  - Vedhicka - Kaaviya Thalaivan

== Multiple Nominations ==
The following individuals have received two or more Best Actress nominations:

Wins	Actress
2	Asin, Padmapriya, Sneha, Parvathy Thiruvothu, Sneha, Pooja Umashankar, Anjali, Amala Paul, Nithya Menen, Nayanthara, Vedhicka

== See also ==
- Tamil cinema
- Cinema of India
