= Red tea =

In English, red tea normally refers to rooibos.

Red tea may also refer to:

- Black tea, which is referred to in various Asian languages as 紅茶 (literally "red tea")
  - The completely oxidized bud leaves of Camellia sinensis from which black tea is made
- Hibiscus tea, tisane made from sepals of Hibiscus sabdariffa
- Red Tea, a 1969 English-language novel by Paul Harris Daniel
- Red phosphorus methamphetamine (slang)
