= Anaika Soti =

Indian actress and model

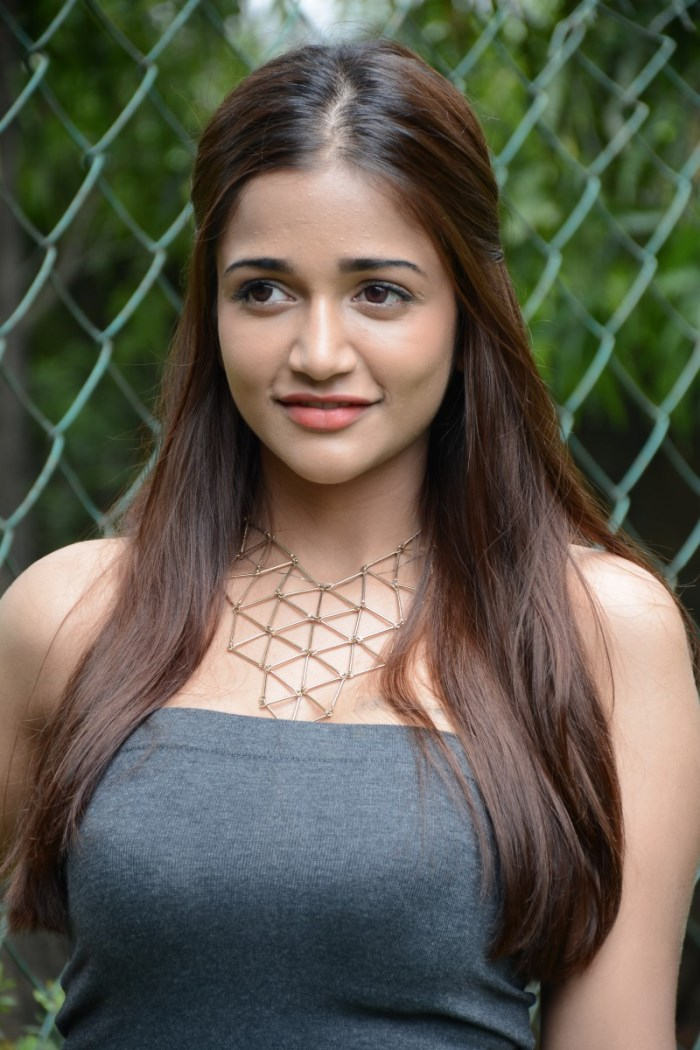
- Soti in 2014
- Occupations: Actress; model
- Years active: 2013–present

Anaika Soti is an Indian actress and model. She predominantly works in Tamil films and in a few Malayalam, Telugu and Hindi films.

== Career ==
Director Ram Gopal Varma met her in an elevator and finding her attractive and appealing, asked her to star in his movies, but she was not interested in the offer. Still RGV convinced her and she subsequently signed on to appear in his bilingual crime film, Satya 2 (2013), shot in Hindi and Telugu, based on the Mumbai underworld.

Her second release was Vasanthabalan's Tamil period fiction film Kaaviya Thalaivan starring alongside Prithviraj Sukumaran, Siddharth and Vedhika. She was signed for the film while working on Satya 2, and subsequently shot for the film in rural Tamil Nadu, revealing she worked on acting like a princess to get into character. Both, the film and her portrayal of a Zamindar's daughter, won positive reviews upon release. She teamed up with Ram Gopal Varma again for the Telugu venture 365 Days, noting that it was her most involving role till date.

== Filmography ==
Key
†	Denotes films that have not yet been released

List of films and roles
Year	Title	Role	Language(s)	Notes	Ref.
2013	Satya 2	Chitra	Hindi; Telugu	Bilingual film	
2014	Kaaviya Thalaivan	Yuvarani Rangamma	Tamil		
2015	365 Days	Shreya	Telugu		
2018	Semma Botha Aagathey	Nina	Tamil		
2019	Kee	Vandana	Tamil		
2021	Parris Jeyaraj	Divya	Tamil		
2021	Plan Panni Pannanum	Item Number	Tamil	Special appearance in the song "Plan Panni"	
