= Semma Botha Aagathey =

- Directed by: Badri Venkatesh
- Produced by: Atharvaa; V. Madhiazhagan
- Starring: Atharvaa; Mishti; Anaika Soti
- Cinematography: Gopi Amarnath
- Edited by: Praveen K. L.
- Music by: Yuvan Shankar Raja
- Production companies: Kickass Entertainment; Etcetera Entertainment
- Release date: 29 June 2018
- Running time: 133 minutes
- Country: India
- Language: Tamil

Semma Botha Aagathey (transl. Don't get too high) is a 2018 Indian Tamil-language action thriller film directed by Badri Venkatesh and dialogues written by G. Radhakrishnan. The film stars Atharvaa, who also produces the film, alongside Mishti and Anaika Soti. Featuring music composed by Yuvan Shankar Raja, the film began production during January 2016 and was released in India on 29 June 2018.

== Plot ==
The movie begins with Ramesh (Atharvaa) waking up with a hangover and remembering the previous day's events. After a breakup with his girlfriend Madhu (Mishti), he is sad and heavily drinks with his friend Nandhu (Karunakaran). On his advice, Ramesh calls for a female escort and sneaks her into his apartment. Ramesh has to step out of his house due to his neighbor Devi's (Devadarshini) emergency. He asks the escort, Nina (Anaika Soti), to wait inside his house, promising to come back soon. While he returns, he finds that she is dead under mysterious circumstances. Ramesh is shocked and tries to find details about her. He sees restaurant receipts in her bag, checks the CCTV footage, and finds that another man named Ravi (Prinz Nithik) had accompanied her before meeting Ramesh. From her cell phone, he finds her house address, travels to Palakkad, and asks Nandhu to stay behind and guard the dead body. He is unable to find any information from Nina's family and leaves, but Nina's sister calls Sekar (John Vijay) and informs him about Ramesh.

Sekar tracks Ramesh down and asks about Nina and Ravi. He says Ravi was a henchman who had usurped money and documents from the politician whom he worked for. Ramesh escapes from Sekar. Nandhu calls him with information about a series of numbers that he found from Nina's purse and also says that he is hiding with the dead body in the attic because of Ramesh's intruding neighbors—Devi's father (Manobala) and husband Ram (Chetan), who came to use his gas stove for emergency purposes and would not leave. Ramesh goes to a railway station and finds that the cloakroom lockers are the series of numbers that Nina had noted down. He sees Ravi opening the lockers, beats him up, and asks why he killed Nina. Ravi says that he escaped with his boss's money and had picked up Nina to escort him. During his stay with her, fake police threatened and looted all the money. He finds that all of this was part of Nina's plan and that she had taken the money, hid it in the lockers, and left for Chennai. Ravi found her, and after getting information about the money's location, he poisoned her drink as revenge. It is then that Ramesh met Nina, and she ended up dying at his apartment.

After recording Ravi's confession, Ramesh strikes a deal with him that he should get rid of Nina's body from his house and takes him in his car. Ravi tries to escape, and after a chase, falls to his death. Disappointed, Ramesh returns to Chennai and plans to dispose of the dead body himself. Along with Nandhu, he drives Nina's body to the place where Ravi died. Keeping both of the dead people together along with the money, he informs Sekar of the whereabouts of Ravi, Nina, and the money. Sekar comes to the location, takes back his boss's money, and disposes of both Ravi and Nina's bodies.

Finally relieved of all the unwanted trouble, Ramesh and Nandhu return to their homes in Chennai. Ramesh patches up with Madhu when Nandhu informs him that Sekar and his men died in a road accident. Ramesh and Nandhu are overjoyed because there is no living proof now of their unwitting involvement in Ravi and Nina's murders.

== Cast ==
- Atharvaa as Ramesh
- Mishti as Madhu
- Anaika Soti as Nina
- Karunakaran as Nandhu
- John Vijay as Sekar
- Prinz Nithik as Ravi
- Devadarshini as Devi
- Chetan as Ram
- Manobala as Devi's father
- Yogi Babu as Soosai
- M. S. Bhaskar as Kunjunni
- Aadukalam Naren as Varghese
- G. K. Reddy as Annachi
- Gayathri
- Iti Acharya as Bindhu
- Billy Murali

== Production ==
On 1 January 2016, Atharvaa launched a new productions studio named Kickass Entertainment and revealed that he produce a film directed by Badri Venkatesh, who had introduced him in films through Baana Kaathadi (2010). In a turn of events a week later, Atharvaa revealed that he would portray the lead role himself. In April 2016, actresses Mishti and Anaika Soti joined the film's cast, as did John Vijay and Karunakaran. The film was shot across early 2016 in Tamil Nadu and Kerala.

== Soundtrack ==
Semma Botha Aagathey

Soundtrack album by Yuvan Shankar Raja
- Released: 22 November 2017
- Genre: Feature film soundtrack
- Length: 13:53
- Language: Tamil
- Label: U1 Records

Yuvan Shankar Raja chronology
Oxygen (2017)	Semma Botha Aagathey (2017)	Balloon (2017)
External audio
- Audio Jukebox on YouTube

The soundtrack of Semma Botha Aagathey consists of five songs composed and arranged by Yuvan Shankar Raja.

Tracklist
No.	Title	Lyrics	Singer(s)	Length
1.	"Semma Botha Aagathey"	Rokesh, Badri Venkatesh	Yuvan Shankar Raja	02:58
2.	"Itemkaaran"	Rokesh	Ranjith, Anitha Karthikeyan	03:51
3.	"Idhayathai Oru Nodi"	Niranjan Bharathi	Yuvan Shankar Raja	03:46
4.	"Gaali Pannura"	Badri Venkatesh	Remya Nambeesan	02:25
5.	"Survival Theme"		Instrumental	00:58
Total length:				13:53

== Reception ==
Rakesh Mehar of The News Minute wrote, "The one thing that could be said about Semma Botha Aagathey is that it doesn’t get boring at any point, mostly because you spend most of the film just trying to figure out why so many random elements have been packed into the story." M Suganth of The Times of India gave 2/5 stars and wrote, "This is the kind of film where plot and plausibility are secondary, and keeping things moving in a somewhat interesting manner is more important." Ashameera Aiyappan of The Indian Express gave 1/5 stars and wrote, "Atharvaa tries his best and gives a fair performance. But the writing is so outrageous that nothing can save this film." Srinivasa Ramanujam of The Hindu wrote, "Semma Botha Aagathey translates to ‘don’t get too high’. In case you are and you don’t want to be, watch the film."

== Release ==
Tamil Nadu theatrical rights of the film were sold for ₹4.5 crore. The satellite rights of the film were bagged by Raj TV.
