= Plan Panni Pannanum =

2021 Tamil Film

- Poster
- Directed by: Badri Venkatesh
- Written by: A.C.Karnamurthy, G.Radhakrishnan; Badri Venkatesh
- Starring: Rio Raj; Ramya Nambeesan; Bala Saravanan
- Cinematography: B. Rajasekar
- Edited by: Sam RDX
- Music by: Yuvan Shankar Raja
- Production company: Positive Print Studios
- Release date: 30 December 2021
- Country: India
- Language: Tamil

Plan Panni Pannanum (transl. You have to plan before you do it) is a 2021 Indian Tamil-language romantic comedy film directed by Badri Venkatesh, produced by Rajesh Kumar and Sinthan L from Positive Print Studios. The story is written by A. C. Karunamurthy (Karnamurthy), dialogues by Radhakrishnan, and the film stars Rio Raj and Ramya Nambeesan. The music for the film is composed by Yuvan Shankar Raja while cinematography is handled by Rajasekar and editing is done by Sam RDX.

The film’s title was taken from a dialogue spoken by Vadivelu in Pokkiri (2007).

== Plot ==
Two friends, Sembi and Raju, end up kidnapping a girl Aambal to know about the whereabouts of Raju's sister Radha, who had eloped with her boyfriend Bharath Raj. The film involves a bride-seeing event that spoofs the 1961 Tamil film Pasamalar; a driver Thilagam, who offers to give the protagonists a short ride but ends up travelling with them all the way to Kodaikanal; Arokkiyasaamy, a guy who shoots videos of men in a state of undress and blackmails them; Captain Kandasamy, the manager of a glamorous star, who is taken for a ride by the friends, who owe him money; and a monologue by Radha, which is amusing, even though it is representation of a young woman from a supposedly down market locality like Royapuram is troubling.

== Cast ==
- Rio Raj as Sembiyan (Sembi)
- Ramya Nambeesan as Aambal
- Bala Saravanan as Raju
- Robo Shankar as Manmadhan
- M. S. Bhaskar as Captain Kandasamy / Vazhukkai Kandasamy (VKS)
- Poornima Ravi as Radha, Raju’s sister
- Siddharth Vipin as Bharathwaj Mittal, Radha’s lover
- Tiger Garden Thangadurai as Paavadai aka Thilagam
- Munishkanth as Singam, Ambal’s uncle
- Santhana Bharathi as Karikalan, Sembiyan’s father
- Viji Chandrasekhar as Sembiyan’s mother
- Aadukalam Naren as Ayyaavvu, Ambal’s father
- Rekha as Ambal’s mother
- Ashvin Raja as Arokkiyasaamy / Eruma Saani
- Sujatha Sivakumar as Raju and Radha’s mother
- G. Marimuthu as Sengalvarayar
- Cheeniamma as Kaaliyamma
- Sriranjini Sundaram as Ambal’s friend
- Sujatha Babu as Bharath’s mother
- Ram Rajendran as one of the kidnapper
- Ravi Venkatraman
- Anaika Soti as herself (special appearance in the song "Plan Panni")
- Badri Venkatesh as himself (special appearance as Director)

== Production ==
The principal production of the film started with a formal Pooja on 17, October 2019 with the main cast and crew being present. Rio Raj, a television artist, was selected to play the male lead. The film's shoot happened in Chennai, Vagamon, Idukki, Gangtok and Kupup located near China border. The shoot was wrapped upM. S. Bhaskar signed to appear as a astrologer in the movie. The movie was completed in three schedules with less than 45 shooting days. The film's post-production works began thereafter. The first look motion poster of the film was released by Sivakarthikeyan and Vijay Sethupathi.

== Music ==
The music and score is composed by Yuvan Shankar Raja. The audio rights have been acquired by Sony Music India. The lyrics for the songs are written by Arunraja Kamaraj and Niranjan Bharathi. The first single track, "Ennodu Vaa" was released on 27 February 2020. The song, was released live on Sun Music and was uploaded on YouTube at the same time.

"Ramya Nambeesan, who has previously sung in Natpuna Ennanu Theriyuma and Damaal Dumeel, has picked up the mic again for her upcoming film, Plan Panni Pannanum. With music by Yuvan Shankar Raja, Ramya has sung a folk song in the film."

The audio launch happened on 11 March 2020 at Sathyam Cinemas. The trailer of the film was released alongside the audio to the press, followed by an online launch.

Track listing
No.	Title	Lyrics	Singer(s)	Length
1.	"Ennodu Va"	Niranjan Bharathi	Rajaganapathy, Ramya NSK	3:25
2.	"Allola Kallolam"	Niranjan Barathi	Remya Nambeesan	3:33
3.	"Plan Panni"	Arunraja Kamaraj	Premgi Amaren	2:52
4.	"Kanave Urave"	Niranjan Barathi	Shreya Ghoshal	3:32
5.	"Neengum Bothil"	Niranjan Barathi	Yuvan Shankar Raja	3:45
Total length:				17:07

== Reception ==
Thinkal Menon of OTTPlay gave 2.5/5 wrote, "Despite having talented actors on board and a not-so-bad plot, the movie falters because of the partly unengaging screenplay." M Suganth of The Times of India gave 2/5 stars and wrote, "Many of the things that might have appeared funny on paper do not translate to the screen or remain just ideas."

== Release ==
=== Home media ===
The satellite rights of the film were sold to Star Vijay and the streaming rights acquired by Disney+ Hotstar.
