= A Little Dream =

- Directed by: P. Dhanapal
- Written by: P. Dhanapal
- Produced by: Minveli Media Works
- Starring: Shobana
- Cinematography: Chezhiyan
- Release date: 21 January 2008

A Little Dream is a 2008 Indian documentary film about the journey of former Indian President A. P. J. Abdul Kalam's life from Rameswaram to Rashtrapati Bhavan. It was produced by Minveli Media Works and scripted-directed by P. Dhanapal of Coimbatore, and unfolds in the form of a story-in-story.

"Importance of education" is the theme of the film, which also contains audio and video clips of important people associated with Dr. A.P.J. Abdul Kalam. Dancer and actress Shobhana played the lead role in the film. The short film concludes with a visual presentation of a poem "A Song of Youth", written by Dr Kalam.

The DVD was released on 21 January 2008 at Chennai by film director K. Balachander in the presence of Dr. A. P. J. Abdul Kalam. The first copy was received by Prof. C. Ramaswamy of the Dr. Mahalingam College of Engineering and Technology.

The special function also marked the launch of 'Inaindunaam 99' (meaning 'Together We 99'), a project inspired by Dr. Kalam, targeting at preparing 66 youngsters into social entrepreneurs under the guidance of 33 mentor organizations.
