= Revathi Sankaran =

Indian American television personality and Harikatha storyteller

- Years active: 1957–present
- Known for: Television and film actor

Revathi Sankaran is an Indian television personality, actress and Harikatha storyteller. She was born in November 15, 1942, in Madurai.

== Awards ==
In 2010, she received Kalaimamani award.

=== Television ===
- Marmadesam
- Anni
- Kasalavu Nesam as Mohana (Gautham's mother)
- Mangayar Choice Sun TV, 2000 - 2008
- Alli Darbar
- Jannal - Ammavukku Rendula Ragu
- Jannal - Adutha veettu kavithaigal
- Paatti Vaithiyam Vijay TV International Channel
- Kalyana Parisu
- Pathi Vaithiyam

== Filmography ==
- All films are in Tamil, unless otherwise noted.

Year	Film	Role	Notes
1998	Kaathala Kaathala	Raasalakshmi	
2000	Pandavas: The Five Warriors	Demoness (voice)	English film
2001	Middle Class Madhavan	Madhavan's mother	
2005	Ullam Ketkumae	Priya's mother	
2008	Vaazhthugal	Kabilan's mother	
2010	Enthiran	Vaseegaran's mother	
