= 365 Days (2015 film) =

- Theatrical release poster
- Directed by: Ram Gopal Varma
- Written by: Ram Gopal Varma
- Produced by: D. Venkatesh; Sudheer Chandra
- Starring: Nandu; Anaika Soti
- Cinematography: Anith Madadi
- Edited by: Anwar Ali
- Music by: Nag Srivatsav
- Production company: ZED3 Pictures
- Distributed by: DV Cine Creations
- Release date: 23 May 2015
- Running time: 110 minutes
- Country: India
- Language: Telugu

365 Days is a 2015 Indian Telugu-language romantic family drama film written and directed by Ram Gopal Varma. Produced by D. Venkatesh, with soundtrack by Nag Srivatsav, the film stars Nandu and Anaika Soti in lead roles. Upon release, the film received mixed reviews.

== Plot ==
Apoorva and Shreya find themselves at a turning point in their marriage as their once-strong bond becomes weaker as a result of increasing miscommunications. They seek the help of a seasoned marriage counselor in a desperate attempt to salvage their relationship, hoping to sort through the tangled problems and find the happiness that first drew them together.

== Cast ==
- Nandu as Apoorva
- Anaika Soti as Shreya
- Krishnudu as Prashant, Apoorva's friend
- Posani Krishna Murali as Apoorva's boss
- Satya Krishnan as Anita, Shreya's friend
- Surekha Vani
- Anand
- Raavi Kondala Rao as Shreya's grandfather

== Soundtrack ==
All music is composed by Nag Srivatsav.

No.	Title	Singer(s)	Length
1.	"Modatisari"	Raman Bharadwaj, Uma Neha
2.	"Thanu Cheyu Duty"	Hemachandra, Yamini
3.	"Adiginappudu"	Deepu, Geetha Madhuri
4.	"Andaaniki Nirvachanam"	Sreeram, Malavika
5.	"Vaddura Pelloddura"	Posani Krishna Murali, Srikanth
6.	"Aa Devudu Puttinchadu"	Sri Krishna, Malavika
7.	"Natakam"	Mani Nagaraj

== Reception ==
Suresh Kaviyarani of the Deccan Chronicle rated the film 2 out of 5 stars and wrote, "365 Days is going to be another disappointment for RGV. Though, he chooses a new genre, he disappoints".
