= Badri Venkatesh =

Indian film director (born 1974)

- Born: Venkatesh; 2 May 1974 (age 51); Chennai, Tamil Nadu, India
- Occupations: director, screenwriter
- Years active: 1996–present

Badri Venkatesh (born 2 May 1974) is an Indian film director and television professional of work experience in film direction, film writing, television fiction writing, reality show direction, event direction, and film making, cinematic teaching, creative management, novel writing and short fiction film making. Venkatesh made his directorial debut with the 2010 Tamil film Baana Kaathadi.

== Career ==
Venkatesh won the National award for his short film, VIdiyalai Nokki, which also is the first Tamil short fiction film to win this accolade.

Venkatesh's popular works include screenplay and direction for the Tamil feature film Baana Kaathadi, released in 2010 and starring Atharvaa, Samantha, and Prasanna.

Apart from mainstream Tamil cinema, Venkatesh has been credited for leading a large number of TV shows including Nalaya Natchathiram Thangamazhai and Amul Super Kudumbam which is a wide-ranging mix of reality shows. He is also directing Miss South India, who is a beauty pageant for all 4 South Indian States.

Venkatesh hails from the Nesapakkam district of Chennai. He is well known as the show director of the popular Celebrity Cricket League (3rd Edition), and the Mirchi Music Awards, the biggest Music awards in South India and various other events in South India.

Badri Venkatesh is back to feature films after a hiatus with the Atharvaa starrer Semma Botha Aagathey (2018). The long-delayed comedy-entertainer Plan Panni Pannanum starring Rio Raj and Remya Nambeesan was released in December 2021.

== Filmography ==
Year	Film	Notes
1996	Vidiyalai Nokki (Short film )	National Film Award for Best Short Fiction Film First Tamil Short Fiction Film to win this accolade.
2010	Baana Kaathadi	
2018	Semma Botha Aagathey	
2021	Plan Panni Pannanum	
