= Vedhika =

Indian actress

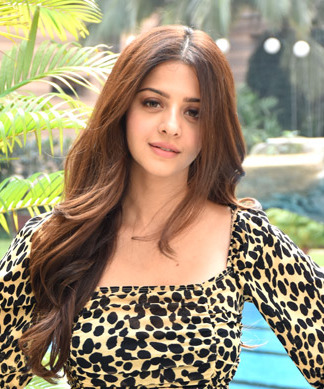
- Vedhika in 2019
- Born: Vedhika Pooja Kumar; Solapur, Maharashtra, India
- Occupations: Actress; model

Vedhika Kumar, known mononymously as Vedhika, is an Indian actress and model who primarily works in Tamil, Telugu, Kannada and Malayalam films. Vedhika is a recipient of an Asiavision Award and two Edison Awards, along with nominations for two Filmfare Awards South.

Vedhika started her acting career with the Tamil film Madrasi. She had her breakthrough with Paradesi (2013). She later established a career with successful films such as Kaaviya Thalaivan (2014), Shivalinga (2016), James & Alice (2016), Kanchana 3 (2019) and Home Minister (2022). In 2019, Vedhika also made her debut in Hindi films with The Body.

== Early life ==
Vedhika was born and brought up in Mumbai. In an interview, Vedhika revealed that her family hails from the border areas of Maharashtra–Karnataka states. Her mother tongue is Kannada.

== Career ==
=== Early work and fluctuations (2006–2012) ===
Early in her career, she was involved in modelling assignments and did a notable advert for biscuits alongside prominent actor Suriya. She was subsequently approached by Arjun to essay the lead role in his production Madrasi and Vedhika accepted the role. After the release of Madrasi, Vedhika went on to sign a big budget Hindi language film, Jai Santoshi Maa, a remake of the 1975 film of the same name, but the film failed to subsequently materialize and Vedhika continued acting in South Indian films. She went on to feature in Raghava Lawrence's comedy horror Muni, but her role was minimal once again and the film went to become an average grosser commercially. Her maiden Telugu venture was in Vijayadasami, a remake of the Tamil film Sivakasi, where her performance was described as "okay" and "average" by critics.

Her first release in 2008, the Silambarasan-starrer Kaalai, received negative reviews and became a commercial failure. However, the film became notable for the dance number, "Kutti Pisase" with Vedhika's dancing being critically appreciated. She went on to appear in a second successive film which was panned by critics and which became a financial failure with a role in Sakkarakatti. The long-delayed film featured Shanthnoo Bhagyaraj making his debut in the lead role and A. R. Rahman providing the soundtrack, however Vedhika's role was described as one of the sole positives from the project. Later that year, she starred in a Kannada film, Sangama opposite Ganesh. In 2009, she appeared as the radio jockey Anjali in A. Venkatesh's Malai Malai with the film consequently going on to become a success commercially. The film had little scope for Vedhika and reviews cited her role as "pure eye candy" whilst claiming she was "apt" for the role. She made a comeback to Telugu films in the same year, with a role in the critically acclaimed Baanam. Her role won her plaudits, whilst her on screen presence with Nara Rohit was praised with a critic citing she gives "good company as the naïve girl" and it is "refreshing to see them together". After the release of Baanam, Kumar took a sabbatical and did not sign any other films until, despite making an appearance in a notable advert with Karthi for mobile company Airtel. She signed and next featured in the Telugu film Daggaraga Dooranga opposite Sumanth, which opened to average reviews in August 2011.

=== Breakthrough and success (2013–present) ===
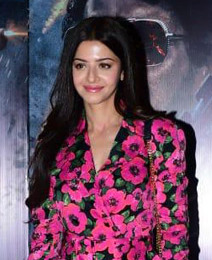
Vedhika at the premiere of Kabzaa

The actress was signed up by director Bala for Paradesi (2013), an adaptation of the 1969 tragic novel Red Tea, which saw her play a village girl opposite Adharvaa. Critics raved about her performance as Angamma, with the critic from Rediff.com noted, "Vedhika plays the role of a young village belle to perfection", while Sify.com labelled that she delivered a "spellbinding performance". Her second release in 2013, the Malayalam film Sringaravelan, became one of the commercial successes of the year. She then appeared in Vasanthabalan's 2014 film Kaaviya Thalaivan, which was set in the backdrop of Madras theatre scene of the 1920s, and featured her opposite Prithviraj Sukumaran and Siddharth. Portraying a character inspired by K. B. Sundarambal, Vedhika called it was a "once-in-a-lifetime opportunity" and did extensive preparations. A reviewer from Deccan Chronicle stated that she "shines in a substantial role".

Vedhika played a possessed women opposite Shiva Rajkumar in the 2016 Kannada film Shivalinga. The film emerged as one of the biggest commercial success of the year. Sunayana Suresh noted, "Vedhika shines in a demanding role, which gives her enough scope for versatility." Most of Vedhika's next releases were either commercial failures or average grosser, except for the Tamil film Kanchana 3 (2019) and Kannada film Home Minister (2022). In Kanchana 3, she played the lead opposite Raghava Lawrence, and the film was a success at the box office. In Home Minister opposite Upendra, she played an investigative reporter. A Sharadhaa stated that she plays her part well. In 2019, Vedhika also made her Hindi film debut with The Body opposite Emraan Hashmi. The film was an official remake of the 2012 Spanish film of the same name. A reviewer of Filmfare wrote, "Vedika looks pretty and she does whatever she could with the ill-written material she was provided with."

== Media image ==
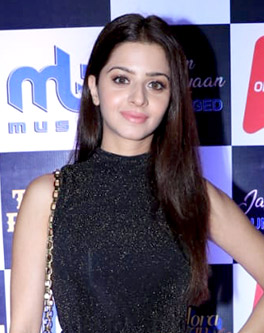
Vedika in 2019

In the Chennai Times Most Desirable Women list, Vedhika was placed 20th in 2013 and 17th in 2014. In its Bangalore Times Most Desirable Women list, she was placed 10th in 2016 and 21st in 2018. In 2024, Vedhika along with PETA, donated a mechanical elephant to a temple in Kannur.

== Filmography ==
Key
†	Denotes films that have not yet been released

=== Films ===
Year	Title	Role(s)	Language	Notes	Ref.
2006	Madrasi	Anjali	Tamil		
2007	Muni	Priya Ganesh	Tamil		
2007	Vijayadasami	Devi	Telugu		
2007	Sakkarakatti	Reema	Tamil		
2008	Kaalai	Brindha	Tamil		
2008	Sangama	Lakshmi	Kannada		
2009	Malai Malai	Anjali	Tamil		
2009	Baanam	Subbalakshmi Panigrahi	Telugu		
2011	Daggaraga Dooranga	Meenakshi	Telugu		
2013	Paradesi	Angamma	Tamil		
2013	Sringaravelan	Radha	Malayalam		
2014	Kaaviya Thalaivan	Ganakokilam' Vadivambal "Vadivu"	Tamil		
2014	Cousins	Arathi	Malayalam		
2016	Shivalinga	Satyabhaama "Satya"	Kannada		
2016	James & Alice	Alice	Malayalam		
2016	Welcome to Central Jail	Radhika	Malayalam		
2017	Gowdru Hotel	Rishi's girlfriend	Kannada		
2019	Kanchana 3	Priya	Tamil		
2019	The Body	Ritu Jha / Isha Rawal	Hindi		
2019	Ruler	Sandhya	Telugu		
2022	Bangarraju	Menaka	Telugu	Cameo appearance	
2022	Home Minister	Surekha	Kannada		
2024	Razakar	Shanthavva	Telugu		
2024	Petta Rap	Janaki	Tamil		
2024	Fear	Sindhu and Indu	Telugu		
2025	Gana	Sujatha	Kannada		
2025	Gajaana	Hema	Tamil		
2026	Aadu 3	Dancer	Malayalam	Special appearance	

=== Television ===
Year	Title	Role	Language	Ref.
2024	Yakshini	Maya	Telugu	

== Awards and nominations ==
Year	Film	Award	Category	Result	Ref.
2014	Paradesi	Edison Awards	Best Extreme Performance – Female	Won	
2014	Paradesi	Techofes	Best Actress	Won	
2014	Paradesi	Vijay Awards	Best Actress	Nominated	
2014	Paradesi	Filmfare Awards South	Best Actress – Tamil	Nominated	
2015	Kaaviya Thalaivan	Filmfare Awards South	Best Actress – Tamil	Nominated	
2015	Kaaviya Thalaivan	Edison Awards	Best Extreme Performance - Female	Won	
2015	Kaaviya Thalaivan	South Indian International Movie Awards	Best Actress – Tamil	Nominated	
2015	Kaaviya Thalaivan	Vijay Awards	Best Actress	Nominated	
2015	Kaaviya Thalaivan	Norway Tamil Film Festival Awards	Best Actress	Won	
2016	James & Alice	Asiavision Awards	Performer of the Year	Won	
2016	James & Alice	South Indian International Movie Awards	Best Actress – Malayalam	Nominated	
2016	Shivalinga	South Indian International Movie Awards	Best Actress – Kannada	Nominated	
