= Pandavas: The Five Warriors =

2000 film by Usha Ganesh Raja

- DVD cover
- Directed by: Usha Ganesh Raja
- Screenplay by: Sujatha
- Based on: Mahabharata by Vyasa
- Edited by: B. Lenin; V. T. Vijayan
- Music by: Ilaiyaraaja
- Production company: Pentamedia Graphics
- Release date: 2000
- Running time: 110 minutes
- Country: India
- Language: English

Pandavas: The Five Warriors is a 2000 Indian English-language animated film directed by Usha Ganesh Raja and produced by Pentamedia Graphics. Based on the five Pandava brothers from the Indian epic Mahabharata, it is India's first computer-animated theatrical film and won the National Film Award for Best English Feature Film.

== Plot ==
King Pandu rules Hastinapur but has to leave the kingdom due to a curse. He cannot have a child, but his wife Kunti has a boon that she could have children by praying to the gods. They invoke the gods of the elements and have five children: Dharm, Bhim, Arjun, Nakul and Dev. The five sons become known as the Pandavas. Pandu has a blind brother, King Dhiru, whose wife gives birth to 101 children, known as the Kauravas.

Pandu dies due to his curse and instructs Kunti to take the five children to Hastinapur so Dhiru can take care of them. The cousins all grow up attending school together. From a young age, Bhim demonstrates his strength and Arjun demonstrates his skill in archery. Dhuri, the eldest Kaurava, becomes jealous of the Pandava brothers. The cousins' uncle, Shakuni, excites Dhuri. He plans to light a palace with the Pandavas in it on fire. Arjun is sceptical of the palace, and a well-wisher warns them, telling them to find the tunnel for an escape route. When the palace is lit on here, the Pandavas and their mother escape into the forest but everyone believes they died in an accident.

In the forest, the Pandavas learn about a demon who terrorises and devours people. Bhim instigates her by eating the food she had prepared for herself. After a quarrel in which he kills her, the demoness transforms into a princess. She thanks Bhim for saving her. She was a princess who got cursed by a scholar for making fun of him due to her vanity. The scholar said she would be saved by a true saviour, and that she would marry the one who saved her.

King Panchala conducts a ceremony to find a suitor for his daughter, Panchali. The Pandavas attend in disguise and Arjun wins the competition. Dhuri also attends recognises them. Dhiru tells him to invite them to their palace apologise, while Shakuni suggests they invite the Pandavas to kill them another way this time. The Pandavas arrive, and Dhuri gives them a separate small palace in Indraprastha. The palace is built of illusions, so when Dhuri visits, he thinks he is stepping on the floor, but he falls into a pool of water. Panchali laughs at him, and he feels insulted. This incident sparks his desire for war against the Pandavas.

Dhuri tells Shakuni he seeks revenge. Shakuni advises him that the family will look down on Dhuri starting a war, but that he has a better idea. Shakuni arranges for a game of gambling between the cousins, with loaded dice unbeknownst to the Pandavas. In the heat of the moment, Dharm loses and has to give his kingdom up to Dhuri and Shakuni. In an effort to win back his kingdom, Dharm loses his brothers, palace, and finally Panchali, too. The brothers become slaves to Dhuri and Shakuni. Dhuri begins to disrobe Panchali to humiliate her. She prays to Krishna, who ensures her cloth does not run out and protects her honour.

The Pandavas go into exile in the forest for thirteen years. After their twelfth year in the forest, Yaksha appears to Sahadev and says he must answer questions before drinking water from the lake. Sahadev does not comply, so when he drinks the water, he falls dead. The other brothers also fail to answer the questions before drinking. Dharma answers satisfactorily, and Yaksha resurrects all of his brothers.

After the thirteen years of exile are over, Dhuri refuses to give the Pandavas back their kingdom. In consulting Krishna, Dhuri asks for a large army, and Arjun asks for Krishna to be his charioteer. Arjun expresses his hesitation in fighting against his family, but Krishna explains to him about his duty and the nature of life and death. When Arjun's son Abhi enters the battlefield, Dhuri unfairly kills him. Krishna devises a plan to help defeat Dronacharya, by spreading the news that Ashwatthama has been killed. Karna uses his most powerful weapon on Bhim's son, Ghatot, which means he cannot use it on Arjun.

In a fit of rage, Dhuri violates the code of conduct and sets the Pandava's tents on fire, but Krishna protects them with rain. Dhuri jumps into a river to avoid being killed. Krishna tricks him into thinking it is beyond sunset, after which he comes out and fights with Bhim. Bhim kills him and the Pandavas rule Hastinapur righteously and justly.

== Voice cast ==
- Vijay Adhiraj as Arjun
- Nilkant as Bhim
- Shaleen Sharma as Dharm
- Noel James as Krishna
- Thalaivasal Vijay as Shakuni
- Vinod Anand as Dhuri
- Vishwa as Dev
- Sanjay Bokaria as Nakul
- Sundarrajan as Bhishma
- Lakshmi Ratan as Drona
- Yog as Pandu
- Gerard Sudhakar A. as Abhi
- Ramanathan N. as Sanjay
- Savitha Radhakrishnan as Kunti
- Shalini as Princess
- Revathi Sankaran as Demonness
- Revathi as Gandhari

== Production ==
Pandavas: The Five Warriors is the first computer-animated theatrical film to be produced by an Indian company — the Chennai-based multimedia and graphics company Pentamedia Graphics and is an adaptation of the Mahabharata, focusing specifically on the Pandava brothers. As the film was mainly targeted at western audiences, some of the characters' names were either anglicised or shortened. Ilaiyaraaja composed the film's music, and J. D.–Jerry were signed as the creative directors. Sujatha served as the screenwriter, while B. Lenin and V. T. Vijayan were the editors. The motion capture cast featured artistes from Koothu-P-Pattarai.

== Release and reception ==
S. R. Ashok Kumar of The Hindu positively reviewed Pandavas: The Five Warriors and its technical aspects, saying "Each and every frame of the nearly 110-minute-long picture is a marvel and it is the best form of expression on celluloid". It won the National Film Award for Best English Feature Film at the 48th National Film Awards. The film had its television premiere on 8 September 2001 on Cartoon Network India, where it aired in both English and Hindi languages.

== See also ==
- Animation industry in India
- List of Indian animated films
