= Home Minister (film) =

Indian Kannada film

- Theatrical Release Poster
- Directed by: Sujay K. Shrihari
- Written by: Sujay K. Shrihari
- Produced by: Poorna Naidu
- Starring: Upendra; Vedhika
- Cinematography: Kunjunni S Kumar
- Edited by: Antony
- Music by: Ghibran
- Production company: Sreeyas Chitra
- Release date: 1 April 2022
- Country: India
- Language: Kannada

Home Minister is a 2022 Indian Kannada-language action comedy film written and directed by Sujay K. Shrihari and produced by Poorna Naidu. The cinematography done by Kunjunni S Kumar. The film stars Upendra, Vedhika, Tanya Hope, Suman Ranganathan and Aadhya.

== Premise ==
Renuka Prasad aka Renu is a homemaker living with his wife Surekha, an investigative reporter and daughter Kundana at an apartment complex. When Renu loses ₹20 lakh (US$21,000) which was entrusted by Surekha for her father's operation. Why did Renu took responsibility as a homemaker and whether he would recover the money forms the rest of the plot.

== Cast ==
- Upendra as Renuka Prasad
- Vedhika as Surekha
- Tanya Hope as Jessie
- Suman Ranganathan
- Abhimanyu Singh
- Avinash as Renuka's Father
- Sadhu Kokila
- Suman
- Vijay Chendoor
- Tilak Shekar
- Rajesh Nataranga

== Soundtrack ==
The soundtrack album has five singles composed by Ghibran, and released on Anand Audio.

Home Minister (Original Motion Picture Soundtrack)
No.	Title	Singer(s)	Length
1.	"Summane Beeso"	Midhun Mukundan, Anuradha Bhat	4:09
2.	"Home Minister Title Track"	Shashank Sheshagiri	3:16
3.	"Seetha Geetha Mala"	Koushith, Supriyaa Ram	3:34
4.	"Jaadu Maadu Nee"	Sanjith Hegde
5.	"Gira Gira"	Vyasaraj
Total length:			16:38

== Release ==
The film was released on 1 April 2022.

== Reception ==
=== Critical response ===
Jagadish Angadi from Deccan Herald wrote "The pathetically choreographed action sequences make stunt scenes of the 90s look better. Upendra excels in some scenes. Those valuing their money and time must skip the film". A Sharadhaa from Cinema Express wrote "Home Minister is a family entertainer that aims to tell a powerful message to young parents. Hope it reaches its target audience and becomes a conversation starter". Pratibha Joy from OTT Play says "Home Minister is a much-delayed film and the better late than never maxim really doesn’t apply here. This is a film that you can give a skip".
