= Donbass (film) =

2018 film

- Film poster
- Russian: Донбасс
- Ukrainian: Донбас
- Directed by: Sergei Loznitsa
- Written by: Sergei Loznitsa
- Produced by: Heino Deckert
- Cinematography: Oleg Mutu
- Edited by: Danielius Kokanauskis
- Release dates: 9 May 2018 (Cannes); 20 September 2018 (Ukraine)
- Running time: 122 minutes
- Countries: France; Germany; Netherlands; Romania; Ukraine
- Languages: Russian; Ukrainian
- Budget: € 2.5 million
- Box office: $78,133

Donbass (Russian: Донбасс, romanized: Donbass, Ukrainian: Донбас, romanized: Donbas) is a 2018 black comedy war film written and directed by Sergei Loznitsa. It was selected as the opening film in the Un Certain Regard section at the 2018 Cannes Film Festival. At Cannes, Loznitsa won the Un Certain Regard award for Best Director, as well as the Silver Pyramid at the 40th Cairo International Film Festival. It was selected as the Ukrainian entry for the Best Foreign Language Film at the 91st Academy Awards, but it was not nominated. It was filmed in Kryvyi Rih, 300 km west of separatist-occupied Donetsk. At the 49th International Film Festival of India it received the Main Prize - Golden Peacock for Best Feature Film.

== Plot ==
The film consists of a series of episodes about the realities in the occupied territories of eastern Ukraine. The scenes are interconnected according to the principle of plotting in Buñuel's The Phantom of Liberty, where a new character from one episode moves to another. The storylines are reconstructions of real events recorded in professional reports, amateur YouTube videos, and memories of local residents. For example, in one scene, a German journalist and a Ukrainian cameraman meet with Russian soldiers who wear no insignia and pretend to be Donetsk militia. Loznitsa learned about this incident from documentary filmmaker Oleksandr Techynskyi, who starred in Donbas as himself. The incident of the lynching of a captured Ukrainian volunteer by the population of the occupied territories actually took place in Zugres. A grotesque episode with a solemn event at the Novorossiysk registry office represents the wedding of the militia members "Kukla" and "BMW".

== Production ==
=== Budget ===
The film became one of the winners of the Eighth Competition of the Ukrainian State Film Agency. In November 2017, the Ukrainian State Film Agency signed an agreement to provide a share of state funding for the film's production. The total budget of the project amounted to UAH 71 million 340 thousand (EUR 2.5 million), of which Ukrainian funding amounted to UAH 16.7 million. "Donbas was co-produced by Germany, Ukraine, the Netherlands, France, and Romania. The Ukrainian co-producer was Denys Ivanov and the Arthouse Traffic film company. In December 2017, the project was financially supported by Eurimages.

=== Filming ===
Filming began on February 8, 2018, on the outskirts of Kryvyi Rih in the Ternivka district of the Dnipro region and lasted for 4 days.

== Reception ==
=== Critical response ===
Donbass has an approval rating of 88% on review aggregator website Rotten Tomatoes, based on 57 reviews, and an average rating of 7.3/10. The website's critical consensus states, “Brutally powerful and brilliantly filmed, Donbass illustrates man's inhumanity with visceral effectiveness.” It also has a score of 78 out of 100 on Metacritic, based on 17 critics, indicating “generally favorable reviews”.

=== Awards ===
Loznitsa won the Un Certain Regard award for Best Director at the 2018 Cannes Film Festival. He also won the Silver Pyramid, also known as the Special Jury Prize for Best Director, at the 40th Cairo International Film Festival, tied with Thai director Phuttiphong Aroonpheng for Manta Ray. It won Golden Peacock (Best Film) at the 49th International Film Festival of India.

== See also ==
- List of submissions to the 91st Academy Awards for Best Foreign Language Film
- List of Ukrainian submissions for the Academy Award for Best Foreign Language Film
