= To Let (film) =

2019 Tamil drama film by Chezhiyan

- Theatrical release poster
- Directed by: Chezhiyan
- Written by: Chezhiyan
- Produced by: Prema Chezhiyan
- Starring: Santhosh Sreeram; Sheela; Dharun; Aadhira Pandilakshmi
- Cinematography: Chezhiyan
- Edited by: A. Sreekar Prasad
- Production company: zha Cinema
- Release dates: November 2017 (Kolkata International Film Festival); 21 February 2019
- Running time: 99 minutes
- Country: India
- Language: Tamil

To Let is a 2017 Indian Tamil-language drama film written, directed and filmed by Chezhiyan. Produced by his wife Prema, the film stars Santhosh Sreeram, Suseela and Dharun as a family living in a rented house who are ordered by their landlady (Aadhira Pandilakshmi) to vacate within 30 days.

To Let premiered in November 2017 at the Kolkata International Film Festival. At the 65th National Film Awards, it won in the category Best Feature Film in Tamil. The film was theatrically released on 21 February 2019.

== Plot ==
In 2007, Illango is an assistant film director living with his wife Amudha and their five-year-old son Siddharth in a rented apartment. Their landlady is eager to lease that house to IT professionals for a higher rent, so she issues the family a 30-day notice to vacate.

== Cast ==
- Santhosh Sreeram as Illango
- Sheela Rajkumar as Amudha
- Dharun as Siddharth
- Aadhira Pandilakshmi as the landlady
- Ravi Subramaniyan as the landlord
- T. Arul Ezhilan as Selva
- Arumuga Velu as Illango's friend

== Production ==
To Let is the directorial debut of Chezhiyan, and was produced by his wife Prema under the couple's own company La Cinema. Chezhiyan also handled the cinematography and wrote the script. Unlike in most Tamil films, he avoided including songs, claiming, "As we move closely towards realistic cinema, the first element that make an exit is the music. The sound of radio and television, the conversation of people and an auto on the road compensate for the music". The film was completed in 25 days, and the cast were all newcomers.

== Release and reception ==
To Let premiered in November 2017 at the Kolkata International Film Festival, and was screened at numerous film festivals in 2017 and 2018. It was theatrically released on 21 February 2019. Baradwaj Rangan wrote, "Chezhian manages to put his premise through on his own terms". At the 65th National Film Awards, it won in the category Best Feature Film in Tamil. It won the Best Indian film award in the Kolkata International Film Festival.
