= An American in Madras =

An American in Madras is a feature-length documentary film directed by Karan Bali. The film highlights American-born Ellis R Dungan's pioneering contribution to the then-developing Tamil film industry in South India between 1935 and 1950.

== Synopsis ==
The film primarily traces Barton born American Ellis R. Dungan's years in South India from 1935 to 1950. During this period he made quite a name for himself as a successful director in the Tamil film Industry. The great MG Ramachandran (MGR) was introduced in Dungan's debut film as well, Sathi Leelavathi (1936), and among the 13th feature films that Dungan directed, they include famed Carnatic singer MS Subbulakshmi's Sakuntalai (1940) and Meera (both in Tamil (1945) and Hindi (1947)). Besides his feature filmmaking, Dungan also served the Madras Government as their official photographer during World War II and photographed many key moments around the Indian Independence movement. After leaving India in 1950, Dungan returned regularly to the country as an expert on the wildlife films and television serials made in India like Harry Black and the Tiger (1958) and Tarzan Goes to India (1962). The film traces his entire Indian connection till 1994, when on what was to be his last trip to India. the Tamil film industry felicitated him for his pioneering contribution to its early development.

== Screenings and Film Festivals ==
The film had its first ever screening on 1 December 2013 on Ellis R Dungan's 12th death anniversary at the LV Prasad Film and TV Academy auditorium, Chennai. It has since then had various screenings in Chennai including it being part of Madras Day celebrations in 2014, besides showings in Bangalore and Mumbai as well. On the festival circuit, the film has been shown at...

- The Chennai International Film Festival, Chennai, December, 2013
- Mumbai International film Festival for Documentary, Short and Animation Films (MIFF), Mumbai, February 2014
- New York Indian Film Festival (NYIFF), New York, May 2014 (Best Documentary Nominee)
- South Asian International Documentary Festival (SAID), Seattle, June 2014
- London Indian Film Festival, London, July 2014
- International Documentary and Short Film Festival of Kerala (IDSFFK), Trivandrum, July 2014
- Prague Indian Film Festival, Prague, October 2014
- Seattle South Asian Film Festival (SSAFF) Seattle, November 2014
- International Film Festival of India (IFFI), Goa, November 2014
