= Paradesi (2013 film) =

2013 Indian film by Bala

- Theatrical release poster
- Directed by: Bala
- Screenplay by: Bala
- Based on: Red Tea by Paul Harris Daniel
- Produced by: Bala
- Starring: Atharvaa; Vedhika; Dhansika
- Cinematography: Chezhiyan
- Edited by: Kishore Te; L. V. K. Das
- Music by: G. V. Prakash Kumar
- Production company: B Studios
- Distributed by: JSK Film Corporation
- Release date: 15 March 2013
- Running time: 126 minutes
- Country: India
- Language: Tamil

Paradesi (transl. Vagabond) is a 2013 Indian Tamil-language historical drama film written, produced and directed by Bala. The film starrs Atharvaa, Vedhika, and Dhansika, with Jerry and Riythvika in supporting roles. It is based on Eriyum Panikadu, a Tamil translation of the 1969 English novel Red Tea by Paul Harris Daniel. Set during the British Raj, the film revolves around an unemployed villager who is misled into bonded labour at a tea plantation after being promised generous accommodation and high wages by a Kangani, who tyrannically rules it.

The music of Paradesi was composed by G. V. Prakash Kumar, with cinematography by Chezhiyan and editing by Kishore Te and L. V. K. Das. The film was released on 15 March 2013 to positive reviews from critics. It won the National Film Award for Best Costume Design, and three Filmfare Awards South: Best Tamil Director (Bala), Best Tamil Actor (Atharvaa) and Best Tamil Supporting Actress (Dhansika).

== Plot ==
Raasa is a carefree young man living in a rural village in the Madras Presidency, during the British Raj. Orphaned at a young age, he is brought up by his grandmother. Angamma, a local belle, falls for him and takes pleasure in bullying him. When she finally confesses her feelings for him, they become intimate and soon reveal the fact that they are in love before the entire village. Angamma's mother objects as Raasa is unemployed and irresponsible, making him undeserving of marrying anyone.

Raasa then goes to the nearby village in search of work. He comes across a friendly Kangani, who then follows Raasa back to his village. The Kangani offers work for the villagers at the British tea plantations at the hillside. He promises them proper accommodation and high wages. Like many of the villagers, Raasa signs up with the Kangani, hoping that he can send home money every month for his ailing grandmother. Both Angamma and his grandmother are sad to watch him leave.

When Raasa and his villagers arrive at the tea plantation, they realise they have been tricked into bonded labour. The Kangani and his henchmen tyrannically rule the plantation, and the British plantation manager does not care for the welfare of the workers. Raasa befriends Maragadham and her little daughter. They are the wife and child of the only worker who has ever escaped the plantation alive. Raasa soon gets a letter from his grandmother stating that Angamma now lives with her after her family found out she is pregnant with his child.

It is soon revealed that all the workers' daily wages go to their food and lodging. Raasa will have to work there for many more months if he wishes to leave the place. Maragadham too has to work for both her time and for her husband's contract. The workers finally realise that they have been made slaves to the British businessmen. Feeling homesick, Raasa tries to escape, but he is caught by the Kangani's henchmen and gets his left fibula cut, just like every other worker who tried to escape and failed.

An epidemic soon kills many workers in the plantation, including one of Raasa's villagers. During a tea party, an English socialite asks the plantation manager to bring in a real doctor to treat the workers. A doctor from Madras, in the form of an Indian Christian convert, and his English wife come to the plantation. However, rather than treating the sick workers, they spend all their time trying to convert them.

Raasa's time at the plantation draws to an end, but he cannot rejoice as Maragadham becomes ill and eventually dies. He then adopts her daughter and awaits his time to leave. However, he is told that by adopting Maragadham's daughter, he has also inherited both her parents' debt to the plantation and will have to work there for almost 10 more years to pay it all off. As he is lamenting his fate on top of a hill, he notices a new group of slaves being brought in. Among them, he sees Angamma and their son. He runs after them and in tears, tells them that they have both walked into misery.

== Cast ==
- Atharvaa as Raasa
- Vedhika as Angamma
- Dhansika as Maragadham
- Jerry as the Kangani
- Riythvika as Karuthakanni
- K. Sivasankar as Parisutham
- Kalpana Shree as Angamma's mother
- Gachamma Paatti

== Production ==
The film was adapted from Eriyum Panikadu, a Tamil translation of the 1969 novel Red Tea by Paul Harris Daniel which explores Harris's encounters with enslaved tea plantation workers in the Madras Presidency in colonial India. It was tentatively titled Eriyum Thanal, before being officially titled Paradesi. Poornima Ramaswamy, in her film debut, was the costume designer. Atharvaa was signed on to play the lead role, in his third leading role after Baana Kaathadi and Muppozhudhum Un Karpanaigal, and Bala asked him to shed 10 kilograms (22 lb). Vedhika was signed as the lead actress after a successful audition and makeup tests; Bala felt only she was apt for that role. To portray her character, she wore dark makeup. Pooja, who had appeared in Bala's Naan Kadavul (2009), was originally cast in another major role, but opted out after the 2012 FEFSI strike caused scheduling conflicts. She was subsequently replaced by Dhansika.

Riythvika, then a college student who was appearing in short films, made her feature film debut. Jerry, one half of the filmmaking duo J. D.–Jerry, made his acting debut as the main antagonist. Bala cast about 200 junior artistes and had them all go bald, ensuring they stayed that way throughout the 200-day schedule. Srinivasan revealed that he was approached by Bala to act in the film but declined due to scheduling conflicts with Kanna Laddu Thinna Aasaiya. Aishwarya Rajesh later revealed that she had auditioned for an undisclosed role in the film. Paradesi was shot in numerous locations including Salur and Manamadurai in Sivagangai district, Munnar and Talaiyar in Kerala, and the forest areas in Theni district. Dhansika starved for six days to achieve her look in the climax portions. Filming was completed in 90 working days.

== Soundtrack ==
The soundtrack was composed by G. V. Prakash Kumar. The audio launch was held on 25 November 2012 at Sathyam Cinemas, Chennai.

== Marketing and release ==
It was initially announced that Paradesi would release on 21 December 2012. Eventually it was released on 15 March 2013. A one-minute reality trailer, released a few days before, drew controversies as it showed Bala hitting and abusing the actors. The final shot, showing Bala smiling, only added to the controversies. Later, it was explained that Bala was simply enacting the scenes for the actors, and the sticks used to hit them were fake.

=== Critical reception ===
S Saraswathi of Rediff.com rated the film 4 stars out of 5, saying "Bala's Paradesi stays with you long after you walk out of the theatre. In fact you need a few minutes to reorient yourself back to the present, Bala captivates with his authentic script, unadorned visuals and down-to-earth characters. A must-watch." Sify said, "Paradesi may be too dark for some viewers. But here is a definitive movie that touches a deep emotional chord and will leave a lump in your throat. Paradesi is definitively a classic with grace and power", going on to call it "brilliant". Vivek Ramz of In.com rated it 4 out of 5 and stated that "Paradesi is dark, gritty and bloody realistic" & concluded that it is "film-making at its best. A must watch!" Ramesh Ganapathy of IBNLive called the film "pure unadulterated cinema and the screenplay and the plot rank high above everything else" and "a master class in great filmmaking".

Baradwaj Rangan wrote for The Hindu, "[The] traditional commercial-film elements are an odd fit in a film that's attempting to be something wholly different. Paradesi is an important lesson on a forgotten chapter of history, but as cinema, Bala's truest isn't up there with Bala's best." Nandini Ramnath of Mint said, "During Paradesi's most heightened moments, it appears as though Bala is single-handedly trying to undo that cinematic legacy" and concluded, "Paradesi clocks a crisp 120 minutes– not enough to replicate the richness of Pithamagan and Avan Ivan, and not enough to accommodate new ideas on age-old forms of exploitation". N Venkateswaran of The Times of India wrote, "Art director C S Balachander and costume designer Poornima faithfully recreate the pre-independence era, while editor Kishore T E ensures a crisp and satisfying watch. But what shines through all this is the vision of Bala".

=== Box office ===
Paradesi collected approximately ₹4.86 crore (US$500,000) in Tamil Nadu in its first weekend. The film collected ₹16.08 lakh (US$17,000) in the United Kingdom and ₹22.48 lakh (US$23,000) in the United States in first weekend.

== Accolades ==
Poornima Ramaswamy won the National Film Award for Best Costume Design for her work in Paradesi. The film received nine Filmfare Awards South nominations including Best Tamil Film (Bala) and Best Tamil Actress (Vedhika), and went on to win for Best Tamil Director (Bala), Best Tamil Actor (Atharvaa) and Best Tamil Supporting Actress (Dhansika).

== See also ==
- List of films featuring slavery
