= Kangani, Mohéli =

Town in the Comoros

Coordinates: 12°20′24″S 43°49′18″E

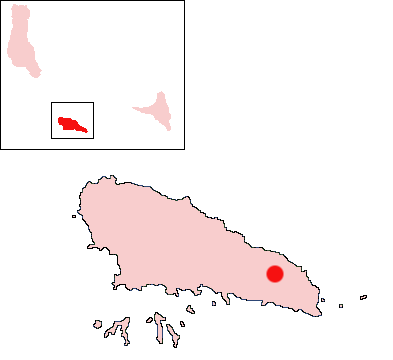
Location of Kangani on the island of Mohéli

Kangani is a town located on the island of Mohéli in the Comoros.
