= Jonathas' Forest =

2012 film directed by Sergio Andrade

- Theatrical release poster
- Directed by: Sergio Andrade
- Written by: Sergio Andrade
- Produced by: Sergio Andrade
- Starring: Begê Muniz; Francisco Mendes; Ítalo Castro; Viktoria Vinyarska; Socorro Papoula
- Cinematography: Yure Cesar
- Edited by: Fábio Baldo
- Music by: Ian Fonseca
- Production company: Rio Tarumã Films
- Distributed by: Vitrine Filmes (Brazil); BildKraft (Germany)
- Release date: October 8, 2012 (Festival do Rio)
- Country: Brazil
- Language: Portuguese

Jonathas' Forest (Portuguese: A Floresta de Jonathas) is a 2012 Brazilian drama film written and directed by Sergio Andrade.

The film premiered at the Festival do Rio, where participated in the competitive exhibition of Première Brazil.

== Plot ==
Jonathas lives with his parents and his brother, Juliano, at a small farm in the rural areas of Amazonas. The brothers meet Milly, a visitor from Ukraine, and the indigenous Kedassere. The group decides to spend the weekend in a camping. Even against paternal wishes, seduced by Milly and through the woods, Jonathas takes on the most transformative of his journeys.

== Cast ==
- Begê Muniz as Jonathas
- Francisco Mendes as Father
- Viktoryia Vinyarska as Milly
- Ítalo Castro as Juliano
- Socorro Papoula as Mother
- Alex Lima as Kedassere
- João Tavares as Jonathas 2
- David Almeida as Mateiro
- Maria Maciel as Maria das Patas

== Production ==
=== Development ===
The director Sergio Andrade said that the great challenge of the film was to show the Amazon by a perspective beyond the stereotypes. "People who aren't from here look here thinking that is a place very exotic, very mystical, and I wanted to unravel what really is our forest," he said.

== Festivals ==
- Festival do Rio
- São Paulo International Film Festival
- Amazonas Film Festival
- International Film Festival Rotterdam
- Museum of Fine Arts, Boston
- Prague Febiofest
- Curitiba International Film Festival
- Taipei Film Festival
- Maine International Film Festival
