= Inercia =

- Directed by: Isabel Muñoz Cota Callejas
- Produced by: Henner Hofmann; Liliana Padro; Karla Bukantz
- Cinematography: Miguel Angel Garcia
- Edited by: Francisco X. Rivera; Ana Laura Castro
- Music by: Tomas Barreiro
- Release date: March 1, 2013 (Mexico City)
- Running time: 70 minutes
- Country: Mexico
- Language: Spanish

Inercia (lit. 'Inertia') is a 2013 Mexican drama film directed by Isabel Muñoz Cota Callejas, who also wrote the screenplay in collaboration with Claudia Sainte-Luce. The cast includes Maricela Penalosam, Flavio Medina, Mauricio Isaac and Veronica Langer. Filming locations included Colonia Roma and Narvarte in Mexico City.

Inercia was featured in the 2013 Montreal World Film Festival and the 2013 Guadalajara Film Festival.

== Plot ==
Lucia (Maricela Penalosam) meets her ex-boyfriend Bruno (Flavio Medina) after 12 years when she comes to a hospital with her friend. She realizes that Bruno is admitted there for a kidney ailment and then decides to stay to look after him, slowly the only person he can count on.
