= Sneha =

- Gender: Female
- Language: Sanskrit

Origin
- Origin: India
- Meaning: Love, affection (friendship)
- Region of origin: India

Sneha (Hindi: स्नेहा) is a popular Hindu Indian feminine given name, which means "Affection".

== Notable people named Sneha ==
- Sneha (actress) (born 1981), Indian actress in South Indian films - Tamil, Telugu, Malayalam and Kannada languages
- Sneha Jawale (born 1977), Indian social worker, TV presenter and activist
- Sneha Khanwalkar (born 1983), Indian music director
- Sneha Anne Philip (1969–2001), Indian-American physician who disappeared in the September 11 attacks
- Sneha Kishore (born 1993), Indian cricketer
- Sneha Sharma (born 1990), Indian racing driver and pilot
- Sneha Solanki (born 1973), British artist and educator
- Sneha Ullal (born 1987), Indian actress in Hindi and Telugu films
- Sneha Wagh (born 1987), Indian actress in Hindi and Marathi TV series
