= J. D.–Jerry =

Indian filmmaking duo

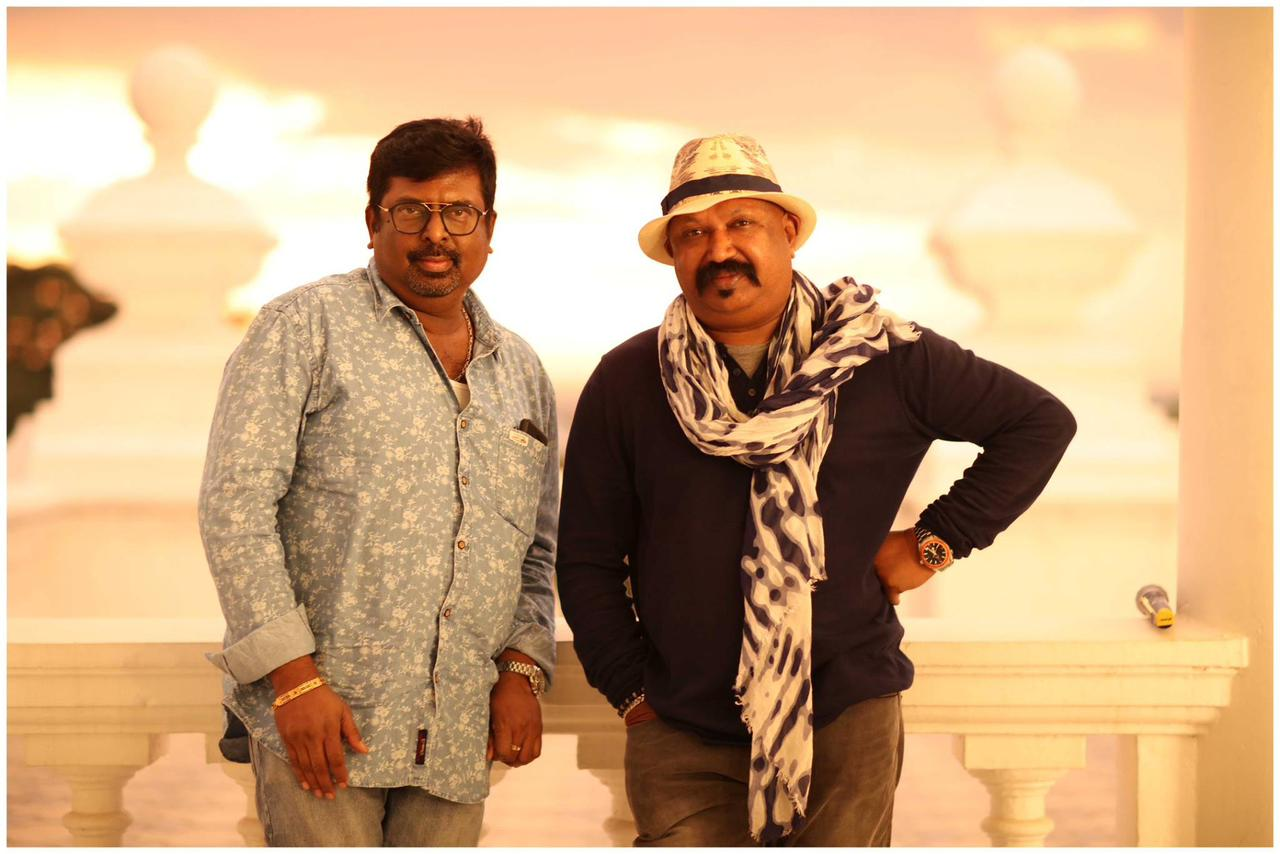
- J. D. (left) and Jerry (right)
- Born: Joseph D. Sami; July 31, 1964 (age 61); Jerald Arockiam; June 1, 1964 (age 61); Tamil Nadu, India
- Occupation: Filmmakers
- Years active: 1997–present
- Website: jdjery.com

Joseph D. Sami and Jerald Arockiam, collectively known as J. D.–Jerry, are an Indian filmmaking duo, who work predominantly in Tamil cinema.

== Career ==
Their first film as directors was Ullaasam (1997), a romantic action movie, which had Ajith Kumar and Vikram in the lead roles and produced by Amitabh Bachchan. The duo made an animation feature film Pandavas: The Five Warriors (2000). The movie adapted from Mahabharata, an Indian epic and went on to claim the National Film Award for Best Feature Film in English. They have directed their next movie Whistle (2003), was their next directorial in the horror genre with a cast of then new faces.

They have directed television serials. The duo subsequently next worked as assistant directors to Shankar in Sivaji (2007), helping with story discussion.

Their latest movie The Legend (2022), is a science fiction action film.

== Filmography ==
List of J. D.–Jerry directorial credits
Year	Film	Director	Notes
1997	Ullaasam	Yes	
2000	Pandavas: The Five Warriors	Creative	credited as J.D.–Jery
2003	Whistle	Yes	credited as J.D.–Jery
2022	The Legend	Yes	

As actor

- Paradesi (2013) (Jerry only)
