= Kangani system =

British-ruled Southeast Asian form of labor recruitment and organization

The kangani system was a form of labour recruitment and organisation in parts of Southeast Asia under British colonial rule, generally in operation from the early 19th century until the early 20th century, specifically the areas now known as Myanmar, Malaysia, Singapore, and Sri Lanka. The system was similar to indentured servitude and both were in operation during the same period, with the kangani system becoming more popular from late 19th century onward. Under the kangani system, recruitment and management were taken up by people called the kangani (from the Tamil word for 'the one who observes' an equivalent for the English word foreman, the root word kan in Tamil meaning 'eye'), who directly recruited migrants from India, especially South India in Tamil-majority areas, via networks of friends, family and other contacts, with the same person then responsible for the supervision of the labourers they recruited.

The leader of those groups of immigrants had considerable control over their affairs and generally forced them to enter debt-bondage relationships by illegally deducting their wages. In smaller groups, they might work as labourers themselves in addition to their other responsibilities, but in larger groups, their role was more one of organisation, supervision and dealing with the landowner. With certain estimates showing that nearly one eighth of Indian labourers in Burma were kangani, some have argued that stepping into the role of recruiter and supervisor, with its accompanied rise in income and status, was a relatively achievable form of social mobility for the labourers of the plantations.

== Etymology ==
The word kangani is derived from the Tamil language. It comes from the root word kan (கண்), meaning "eye," combined with ani (அணி), meaning "one who observes" or "foreman." Thus, the term roughly translates to "the one who oversees" or "supervisor," reflecting the role of the kangani as the overseer of labourers on plantations. This etymology highlights the hierarchical nature of the system, with the kangani acting as the "eyes" of the plantation owner in managing workers.

== Origins and development ==
The kangani system originated in Ceylon during the 1820s, when the British colonial administration began developing the island’s central highlands for coffee cultivation. Initially, the colonial authorities experimented with indentured labour recruitment, similar to the contracts used in the Caribbean and Mauritius. However, this system required substantial government oversight and was unpopular with planters, who preferred a more informal and cost-effective approach.

The kangani system emerged as a solution by placing the responsibility for recruitment in the hands of trusted Indian labourers already working on plantations. These individuals would travel back to their home villages in South India to recruit relatives, friends, and caste associates. By the mid-19th century, the system had spread beyond Ceylon to Malaya, where it became essential to the rapidly expanding rubber industry. In Burma, a closely related structure known as the Maistry system developed. While similar in function, the Maistry system featured a stricter hierarchy and was reinforced by colonial laws, such as the Workmen’s Breach of Contract Act of 1869, which penalised desertion.

== Recruitment and structure ==
=== Recruitment process ===
Recruitment under the kangani system relied heavily on personal networks. A kangani returning home to South India would approach individuals from his own village or caste, offering advances of money to cover travel and initial expenses. These advances were often framed as gestures of generosity, but in reality, they created binding debt obligations for the recruits. Once they arrived on the plantations, wages were systematically deducted to repay these advances, often at inflated or fabricated rates.

Because recruitment was based on kinship and caste relationships, many labourers trusted the kangani’s promises of high wages and better living conditions overseas. This system of “chain migration” meant that entire families or groups of neighbours would migrate together, creating tightly knit plantation communities. While this provided a sense of familiarity and mutual support, it also reinforced the kangani’s authority, as workers were reluctant to challenge someone with deep social ties to their community. The informality of this system also meant there was minimal government oversight, allowing abuse to flourish unchecked.

=== Structure and role of the Kangani ===
The kangani was the key intermediary between the European plantation owner and the workers. His duties included recruiting labourers, supervising work in the fields, distributing wages and rations, enforcing discipline, mediating disputes, and managing the day-to-day life of the workers on the estate. In smaller plantations, a kangani might work alongside his recruits, but in larger estates he typically served as a full-time supervisor, assisted by “sub-kanganis” who reported directly to him.

The position of kangani came with both power and profit. Kanganis received higher wages than ordinary workers and often earned additional income by making unauthorized deductions from wages or operating side businesses such as selling provisions. Their elevated status gave them considerable influence within the migrant community, and for some, becoming a kangani was one of the few opportunities for social mobility in the rigid plantation hierarchy. At one point, nearly one-eighth of all Indian labourers in Burma were kanganis themselves, indicating how widespread the system became.

== Exploitation and debt bondage ==
Despite appearing to offer voluntary migration, the kangani system often functioned as a form of debt bondage. Workers arrived already indebted to the kangani for advances and were rarely able to repay these debts due to low wages and constant deductions. Some labourers remained trapped in this cycle for years, effectively binding them to the plantation.

Physical coercion was also common. Cases were documented where workers who attempted to leave were subjected to violence, had their passports confiscated, or faced threats of social ostracism within their caste networks. Because recruitment operated through tightly knit kinship groups, deserting a plantation could bring dishonour to an entire family, further discouraging resistance. Reports by reformers and Indian nationalists highlighted widespread abuses, including the recruitment of children, misrepresentation of wages, overcrowded and unhygienic living conditions, and violent suppression of strikes.

== Comparison with indenture and Maistry systems ==
The kangani system differed significantly from the indentured labour system used elsewhere in the British Empire. Under indenture, workers signed fixed-term contracts and were transported under formal agreements supervised by colonial authorities. In contrast, the kangani system relied on personal trust and informal arrangements, with minimal paperwork or government involvement. While this made migration appear voluntary, it also meant that workers lacked legal protections and had limited recourse against exploitation.

The Maistry system in Burma shared many similarities with the kangani system, but was more tightly controlled through legal mechanisms. Laws like the Workmen’s Breach of Contract Act of 1869 criminalised desertion, giving employers and maistries even greater authority over workers. In practice, both systems blurred the lines between free labour and coercion, combining elements of slavery, indenture, and modern labour brokerage.

== Regional spread and scale ==
The kangani system was widespread across Southeast Asia, though it operated differently in each region. In Ceylon, it became the dominant recruitment method for tea plantations from the 1820s until the 1940s. In Malaya, the system gained prominence after 1910, as the booming rubber industry required a steady influx of Indian labour. By this time, it had largely replaced indentured labour as the primary mechanism for migration. In Burma, the Maistry system was integral to rice cultivation in the Irrawaddy Delta and to major construction projects in Rangoon and other urban centres.

Between 1840 and 1942, approximately 1.7 million Indians migrated to Malaya, 1.6 million to Burma, and 1 million to Ceylon through a combination of indentured and kangani recruitment. These migrations profoundly reshaped the demographic landscape of Southeast Asia, creating enduring South Indian diaspora communities in these regions.

== Regulation and criticism ==
As reports of abuse spread, the kangani system came under increasing criticism in the early 20th century. Indian nationalists, reformers, and organisations such as the Indian National Congress condemned the system as a disguised form of slavery. In response to public pressure, colonial governments introduced regulatory measures, including the licensing of kanganis, the establishment of the Indian Immigration Committee to oversee recruitment, and the creation of the Indian Immigration Fund to provide welfare services for migrant workers. Despite these efforts, enforcement remained weak, and the personal authority of kanganis continued largely unchecked until the late 1930s.

== Decline and abolition ==
The Great Depression of the 1930s caused a sharp decline in global commodity prices, leading to widespread unemployment and reducing the demand for migrant labour. In 1938, the Government of India formally banned assisted emigration to Malaya, effectively bringing the kangani system to an end. World War II and the Japanese occupation of Southeast Asia further disrupted migration flows and labour structures. After the war, Indian migration to the region continued, but it occurred on a free-migrant basis without the kangani acting as intermediary. Nevertheless, many of the social hierarchies and community structures established under the system persisted for decades.

== Legacy ==
The kangani system profoundly shaped the South Indian diaspora in Southeast Asia. Tamil, Telugu, and Malayali communities in Sri Lanka, Malaysia, Singapore, and Myanmar trace their origins to the migration networks established under this system. While it provided limited upward mobility for some individuals who became kanganis, it also entrenched deep economic inequalities and reinforced colonial hierarchies. The memory of exploitation under the kangani system helped inspire later workers’ rights movements, trade unions, and anti-colonial activism across the region.

Today, the kangani system is studied as an example of how colonial labour regimes combined coercion with informal social mechanisms, bridging the gap between older forms of slavery and modern systems of migrant labour.
