= Baana Kaathadi =

- Theatrical release poster
- Directed by: Badri Venkatesh
- Written by: Badri Venkatesh; Lakshmikanth; G.Radhakrishnan (dialogues)
- Produced by: Sendhil Thyagarajan; T. Arjun
- Starring: Atharvaa; Samantha Ruth Prabhu; Prasanna
- Cinematography: Richard M. Nathan
- Edited by: Suresh Urs
- Music by: Yuvan Shankar Raja
- Production company: Sathya Jyothi Films
- Release date: 6 August 2010
- Running time: 146 minutes
- Country: India
- Language: Tamil

Baana Kaathadi (transl. Kite) is a 2010 Indian Tamil-language romantic action film written and directed by Badri Venkatesh. The film stars Atharvaa, Samantha and Prasanna. Featuring music scored by Yuvan Shankar Raja, cinematography by Richard M. Nathan and editing by Suresh Urs, the film was released on 6 August 2010. It is the last movie of Atharvaa's father Murali, who made a special appearance in this movie before his death in September 2010. The movie received critical acclaim and an above average success at the box office. The film marked both Atharvaa's and Samantha's lead debut film in Tamil cinema.

== Plot ==
One day, in his rush to grab hold of a falling kite, Ramesh (Atharvaa) bumps into Priya (Samantha), a fashion technology student. In the process, her pendrive falls into his pocket, without either of them realising. The pendrive consists of six months' worth of Priya's project work, and she needed to submit it. Asking the principal for an extension, Priya searches for Ramesh and finds him. She humiliates him while he denies that the pendrive is with him. One day after college, Ramesh and his friends see Priya on the road. They tease and infuriate her, eventually leading to her slapping him.

A few days later, while Ramesh's mother (Mounika) is washing his pants, she finds the pendrive. Ramesh realizes that the fault is his and immediately goes to return the pendrive. Priya is impressed with his attitude, as she had expected him to keep the pendrive because she slapped him. This marks the beginning of their friendship. As time passes, Priya and Ramesh become closer. Urged by his friends, Ramesh goes to tell Priya that he loves her. However, while asking for money from his friend Kumar (Karunas), he accidentally takes the condom from Kumar's pocket. When Ramesh sees the condom, he tries to hide it from Priya. However, just then, the police arrive, and he is forced to drop it. Priya sees the condom and is shocked. She denies knowing Ramesh, resulting in him being taken to the police station.

Ramesh is finally brought home and refuses to talk to Priya. His friends try to talk to her, but she does not listen. However, when her friend tells her how much Ramesh actually loves her, she is finally convinced. Ramesh had actually bought Priya a grain of rice with her name written on it. Priya thus realizes that she also loves Ramesh and begins trying to get him to accept her. However, he refuses to accept her because he believes she views him as lower-class.

In a subplot, Ramesh witnesses a murder committed by the local gangster "Maanja" Ravi (Prasanna). In shock, Ramesh runs away and eventually trips over an elderly man. The next day, Ravi sends Ramesh to Gujarat, as he fears for his safety. A few days later, the deceased's son appears in the commissioner's office with the elderly man, who claims that he can identify the boy who ran into him. The deceased is an ex-MLA, and the commissioner decides to handle the matter himself. The inspector warns Ravi and his gang, implying to them that the witness should be killed.

Meanwhile, Priya receives a call from her mother telling her that her father is going for surgery and asking her to return to the US. Priya tells Ramesh that she will be waiting at the bus stop the next day, at the same place where they first met. If he loves her, he would come. The next day, eventually being coaxed by Kumar, Ramesh goes to see her. On the way, Ravi tries to kill him, but his conscience gets the better of him. However, he also knows that there is another goon on the same bus as Priya waiting to kill Ramesh. Ramesh manages to stand in front of Priya, and they hold hands for a while. Unfortunately, Ramesh slips off the steps and is run over by the bus. His mother, friends, and Priya mourn his death, while the goon who was supposed to kill him slips away.

The movie ends with Priya in a car, looking at the grain of rice with her name on it, which Ramesh gave her for her birthday.

== Cast ==
- Atharvaa as Ramesh
- Samantha as Priya
- Prasanna as "Maanja" Ravi
- Karunas as Kumar
- Mounika as Ramesh's mother
- Rajendran as Gang Leader
- Manobala as Conductor
- T. P. Gajendran as Kumar's father
- Udayaraj as Ramesh's friend
- Alex as Councillor
- Imman Annachi as a Police Constable
- Murali as "Idhayam" Raja (guest appearance)
- Debi Dutta in an item number

== Production ==
A major portion of the film was shot at the International Kites Festival of Gujarat, which would be the first time in the history of Tamil cinema.

== Soundtrack ==
Baana's soundtrack is composed by Yuvan Shankar Raja. The soundtrack album was released on 30 April 2010 at Sathyam Cinemas in Chennai.

Track listing
No.	Title	Lyrics	Singer(s)	Length
1.	"Thaakkuthe Kann Thaakkuthe"	Vaali	Yuvan Shankar Raja	4:08
2.	"Oru Paithiyam Pidikkudhu"	Na. Muthukumar	Karthik	5:29
3.	"Kuppathu Rajakkal"	Snehan	Haricharan, Rahul Nambiar, Sathyan	4:43
4.	"En Nenjil"	Na. Muthukumar	Sadhana Sargam	5:10
5.	"Ullara Poondhu Paaru"	Gangai Amaran	Roshini	5:02
Total length:				24:32

== Reception ==
The Times of India wrote "Clearly the screenplay hasn’t played out all that smoothly. The kite could have soared, but falters and dips too often". Sify wrote, "Baana Kaathadi is one of the better films to have emerged out of Kollywood this year. It has a realistic feel about it, but post interval moves at a snail pace and climax is a bit of dampener".
