= Chezhiyan =

Indian cinematographer and director (1968/1969-2026)

Chezhiyan ISC
- Chezhiyan in 2021
- Born: 1968 or 1969; Sivaganga, Tamil Nadu, India
- Died: 10 July 2026 (aged 57); Tharamani, Chennai, Tamil Nadu, India
- Education: Alagappa Chettiar College
- Occupations: Cinematographer; film director; writer
- Years active: 1987–2026

Chezhiyan (1968 or 1969 – 10 July 2026) was an Indian filmmaker and director of photography who worked primarily in the Tamil film industry. He received critical acclaim for his work in Kalloori (2007), Paradesi (2013) and To Let (2017).

== Early life and education ==
Chezhiyan was born in Sivaganga, Tamil Nadu, where he did his early schooling. His parents were primary school teachers. His father was an artist who drew and made toys with clay, and his mother was a storyteller and singer. He completed his diploma in civil engineering from Alagappa Chettiar College in Karaikudi. Chezhiyan was also interested in photography from an early age and enjoyed drawing and painting.

== Career ==
After completing his civil engineering degree, he began his career as an apprentice to P. C. Sreeram before establishing himself as a cinematographer. He worked as an assistant director in the film Thambi (2006). When the film's cinematographer left the production after 60 days, the director, Seeman, asked him to double up as cinematographer. He then shot the climax and all the songs and worked for the remaining 30 days. His name was featured as "additional cinematographer" in Thambi.

Chezhiyan made his debut as a full-fledged cinematographer with Kalloori (2007). Kalloori opened to critical acclaim in December 2007, with a critic stating that "Chezhian's cinematography is perfection itself, capturing the dustiness of the surrounds and the college accurately". He then worked on S. Shankar's production Rettaisuzhi, on V. Gowthaman's Magizhchi and on Seenu Ramasamy's Thenmerku Paruvakaatru, the latter winning the National Film Award for Best Feature Film in Tamil.

He received critical acclaim for his work in Bala's Paradesi (2013) and went on to win many awards, including the Best Cinematography Award at the 2013 BFI London Film Festival Awards.

Chezhiyan then worked on the thriller film Sawaari (2016), on Tharai Thappattai (2016) where he teamed up with director Bala for the second time, and the critically acclaimed film Joker (2016).

He made his directorial debut with To Let, produced by his wife Prema under the couple's production company "La Cinema". The film, inspired by real-life incidents, portrayed the ordeal of a lower-middle-class family hunting for a rented house. At the 65th National Film Awards, it won in the category Best Feature Film in Tamil.

== Death ==
Chezhiyan died after a long illness in Tharamani, on 10 July 2026, at the age of 57.

== Other work ==
Chezhiyan received the Katha award for his short story Harmoniam in 2004. He has also authored a series of books on cinema titled Ulaga Cinema (World Cinema) in Tamil, and the series was published by the Tamil weekly Ananda Vikatan between 2005 and 2007. The recognition earned him a two-year fellowship from the Department of Culture to explore the theme of imagery in short stories. He worked as a cinematographer in many documentaries, including A Little Dream (2008), a biographical docu-fiction about former Indian president A. P. J. Abdul Kalam, and a documentary about Tamil writer Jayakanthan.

== Filmography ==
=== Feature films ===
Year	Film	Cinematographer	Director	Notes
2007	Kalloori	✓		
2010	Rettaisuzhi	✓		
2010	Magizhchi	✓		
2010	Thenmerku Paruvakaatru	✓		
2013	Paradesi	✓		Edison Award for Best Cinematographer; Ananda Vikatan Cinema Awards for Best Cinematographer; Norway Tamil Film Festival Best Story Award; BFI London Film Festival; Nominated, SIIMA Award for Best Cinematographer - Tamil; Nominated, Vijay Award for Best Cinematographer
2016	Tharai Thappattai	✓		
2016	Sawaari	✓		
2016	Joker	✓		
2019	To Let	✓	✓	65th National Film Award for Best Feature Film in Tamil
2022	Kondraal Paavam	✓		
2026	Mylanji	✓		
2026	The Paper Flower(kagitha malar)	✓	✓	Final directorial film; premiered at the 39th Tokyo International Film Festival, Asian Future section.

=== Short films and documentaries ===
- Thiruvizha (2002)
- A Little Dream (2008)
- Ellaigalai Vistharitha Ezhuthu Kalaignan (2011)
