= Atharvaa =

Indian actor

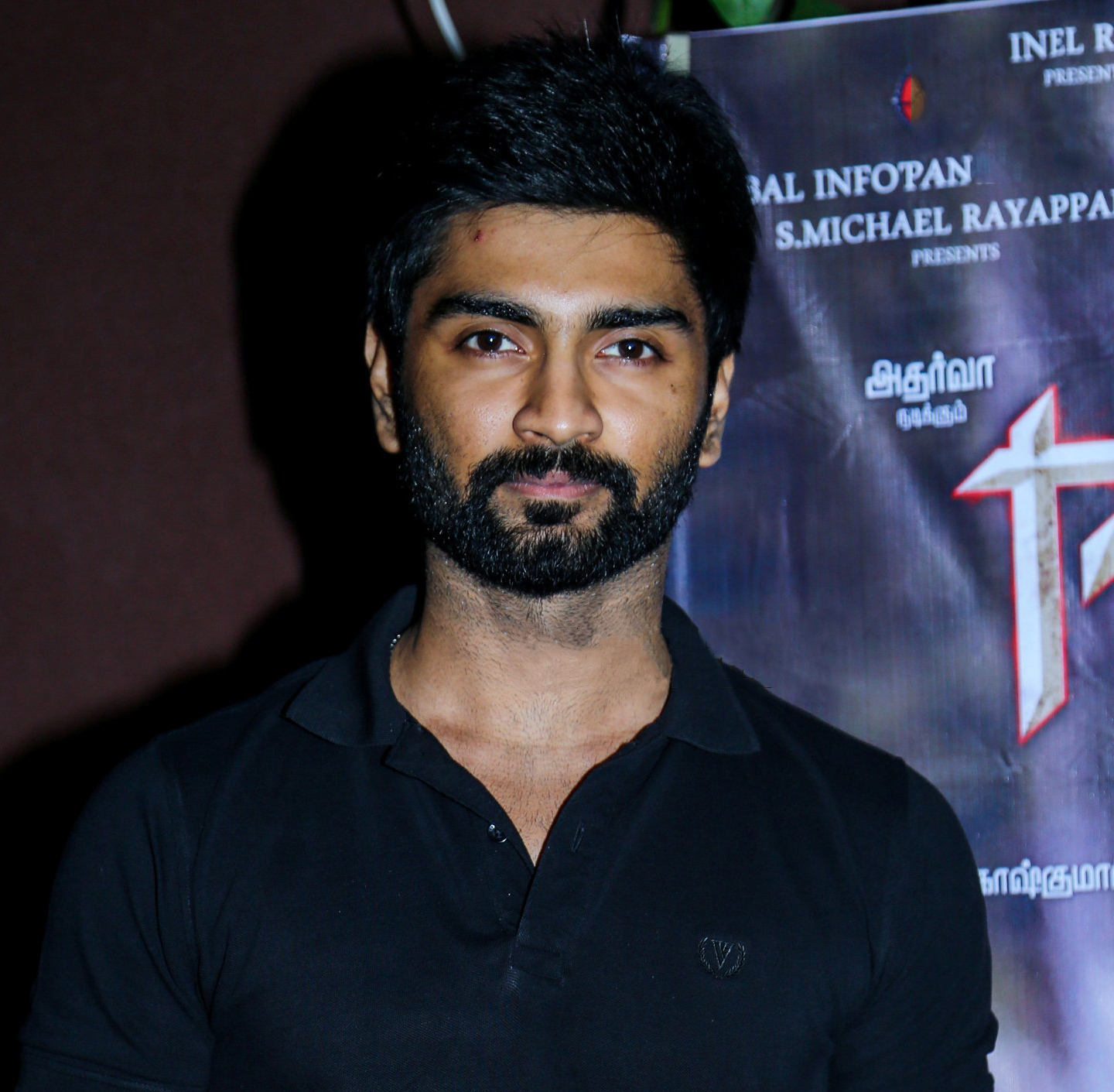
- Atharvaa Murali at Eetti Success Meet
- Born: Vijay Murali; 7 May 1989 (age 37); Chennai, Tamil Nadu, India
- Occupation: Actor
- Years active: 2010–Present
- Parents: Murali; Shobha Murali
- Relatives: S. Siddalingaiah (Grand Father); Daniel Balaji (Uncle); Akash Murali (brother)

Atharvaa Murali (born Vijay Murali) is an Indian actor who works in Tamil cinema. The son of late actor Murali and grandson of late director S. Siddalingaiah, Atharvaa began his acting career with Baana Kaathadi (2010). He then garnered critical acclaim for his performance as a youngster suffering from delusion in the romantic thriller Muppozhudhum Un Karpanaigal (2012), before signing on to feature in Bala's period film Paradesi (2013). His role as a rural villager held as a slave in a tea plantation became his breakthrough performance, earning Atharvaa a Filmfare Award for Best Actor in Tamil.

== Career ==
=== 2010–2017 ===
In 2009, his father found him an offer to play the lead role in a film to be produced by Sathya Jyothi Films and directed by Badri Venkatesh. Titled Baana Kaathadi, the film launched in March 2009 and had Atharvaa pair up with fellow rookie actress Samantha. Portraying a youngster from the Royapuram slum area, he stayed in the locality for forty-five days to learn about the lifestyle, while he also learned to fly a kite for the film, canning scenes at the Gujarat Kite Festival. The film, which also had Murali making a special appearance, released in August 2010 with critics mostly praising his debut performance with Sify.com writing he "makes a promising debut and he dances and emotes well". Similarly a critic from Rediff.com added "romance is a cake-walk" for the actor, drawing comparison with his father's performances in romantic roles, though noted "his dialogue delivery is a little too melodramatic". He subsequently gained recognition at the Edison Awards for Best Debut Actor, while also receiving a nomination from the Vijay Awards in the same category. The success of the film prompted Murali to begin pre-production on a Tamil and Kannada bilingual film which would feature Atharvaa. However, a month after Baana Kaathadi's release, his father Murali died after suffering cardiac arrest. Atharvaa consequently took a break to spend time with his family, before beginning work on a different venture.

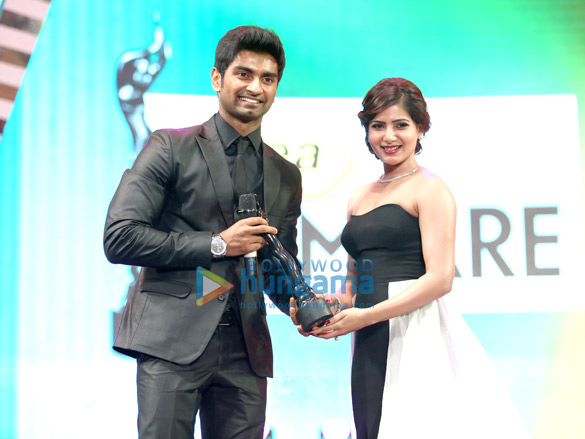
Atharvaa receiving Best Actor – Tamil Award at the 61st Filmfare Awards South from Samantha Ruth Prabhu for his performance in the film Paradesi (2013)

Gautham Vasudev Menon had previously shown interest in directing Atharvaa for a film. A year later, his next release was Muppozhudhum Un Karpanaigal where he played a youngster suffering from hallucinations, film had an average collection and his performance was stated by Sify.com as “good but has miles to go in the histrionics department and voice modulation”. His biggest movie was Paradesi under the direction of Bala, for which he won multiple awards including the Filmfare Award for Best Actor – Tamil. His next film was Sargunam's Chandi Veeran alongside actress Anandhi, which was a flop the box office.

Atharvaa's Eetti, a sports drama film produced by S. Michael Rayappan, in which he pairs up with Sri Divya and the thriller Kanithan in which he features alongside Catherine Tresa, were hits in the box office. In January 2016, he announced that he had set up a production studio called Kickass Entertainment. The first film under his banner would be directed by Badri Venkatesh, who had introduced Atharvaa as an actor. In 2017, Gemini Ganeshanum Suruli Raajanum was released, starring the movie along with Aishwarya Rajesh, Regina Cassandra, Pranitha and Aaditi Pohankar.

=== 2018–present ===
After several delays, Atharvaa's debut production Semma Botha Aagathey (2018), directed by Badri Venkatesh released and was an average success. He later appeared in 2018’s Imaikkaa Nodigal in which he acted as Nayanthara's brother (Arjun), a role that received major recognition. In March 2019, Boomerang, featuring alongside Megha Akash, was released to average reviews. In September 2019, Atharvaa made his Telugu debut in the film Gaddalakonda Ganesh.

In 2021, Atharvaa was seen in Navarasa, an anthology streaming television series on Netflix. He then starred in Thalli Pogathey, remake of the Telugu film Ninnu Kori. Next year, he was seen the action films such as Kuruthi Aattam (2022), Trigger (2022) and Pattathu Arasan (2022). In 2023, he plays as DCP in the gangster drama television series Mathagam. Atharvaa joined with R. Sarathkumar and Rahman in Karthick Naren's Nirangal Moondru (2024), a hyperlink thriller that explores the various emotions and dimensions of a person. In 2025, he appears in two action thrillers titled DNA and Thanal. Then, Atharvaa played an important role in director Sudha Kongara's Parasakthi (2026) followed by his next film, Idhayam Murali (2026).

== Filmography ==
Key
†	Denotes films that have not yet been released

Year	Film	Role	Notes
2010	Baana Kaathadi	Ramesh	Debut film
2011	Ko	Himself	Special appearance in "Aga Naga" song
2012	Muppozhudhum Un Karpanaigal	Ramachandran	
2013	Paradesi	Raasa	
2014	Irumbu Kuthirai	Michael Prithviraj Narayanan	
2015	Chandi Veeran	Paari	
2015	Eetti	Pugazhenthi Subramaniam	
2016	Kanithan	Gowtham Ramalingam	
2017	Gemini Ganeshanum Suruli Raajanum	Gemini Ganeshan	
2018	Semma Botha Aagathey	Ramesh	Also producer
2018	Imaikkaa Nodigal	Dr. Arjun Prabhakar	
2019	Boomerang	Shiva and Shakthi	Double role
2019	100	SI Sathya Ganesh	
2019	Gaddalakonda Ganesh	Abhilash	Telugu film
2021	Thalli Pogathey	Karthik	
2022	Kuruthi Aattam	Shakthivel	
2022	Trigger	Prabhakaran IPS	
2022	Pattathu Arasan	Chinnadurai	
2024	Nirangal Moondru	Vetri Selvam	
2025	DNA	Anand	
2025	Thanal	R. Akilan Ranganathan	
2026	Parasakthi	Chinnadurai "Chinna"	
2026	Idhayam Murali	Idhaya	

=== Music Videos ===
Year	Title	Co-actor	Director	Ref(s)
2018	"Bodhai Kodhai"	Aishwarya Rajesh	Gautham Vasudev Menon	

=== Television Web Series ===
Year	Title	Role	Streaming Platform	Notes	Ref
2021	Navarasa	Vetri	Netflix	Segment: Thunitha Pin	
2023	Mathagam	DCP Ashwath Rathnakumar IPS	Disney+Hotstar		

=== TV Shows ===
Year	Title	Role	Channel	Notes	Ref
2023	Kadhanayagi	Guest	Vijay TV	Guest	

== Awards and nominations ==
Film	Award	Category	Result	Ref.
Baana Kaathadi	Edison Award	Best Male Debutant	Won	
Baana Kaathadi	Vijay Award	Best Debut Actor	Nominated	
Paradesi	Ananda Vikatan Cinema Awards	Best Actor	Won	
Paradesi	BFI London Film Festival	Best Actor	Nominated	
Paradesi	11th Chennai International Film Festival	Special Jury Award	Won	
Paradesi	Edison Awards	Extreme Performance – Male	Won	
Paradesi	61st Filmfare Awards South	Best Actor – Tamil	Won	
Paradesi	Norway Tamil Film Festival Awards	Best Actor	Won	
Paradesi	Techofes Awards	Best Actor	Won	
Paradesi	8th Vijay Awards	Best Actor	Nominated	
Gaddalakonda Ganesh	South Indian International Movie Awards	Best Supporting Actor	Nominated	
