= Red Tea =

1969 novel by Paul Harris Daniel

- Second edition (1984)
- Author: Dr. Paul Harris Daniel
- Language: English
- Publisher: Higginbotham's
- Publication place: India

Red Tea is an English historical novel written by Paul Harris Daniel. It was published in Madras by Higginbotham's in 1969. It is based on the experiences of tea plantation workers in the Madras Presidency during the British Raj.

== Background ==
Daniel was born on May 22, 1910. Daniel was a medical doctor and had worked in a series of Assamese tea plantations in South India as chief medical officer from 1941 to 1965. He also acted as a union organiser. During that time, he had interviewed workers, obtaining signed statements, developing material from which he used to write the novel. Though a work of fiction detailing the lives of Karuppan and Valli, Red Tea was written with an "explicit documentary purpose". It details how the Madras Planters Act of 1903 led to the poor conditions of plantation workers. Debt bondage of the workers, their poor working conditions, their inability to escape their life are all captured in the novel.

== Translation and adaptation ==
It was translated into Tamil as Eriyum Panikaadu by Ira. Murugavel. The name of the translator has been rendered as Era, Ira, or Ra.

The 2013 Tamil film Paradesi was adapted from the novel.
