= John Doe (film) =

2026 film directed by Madhumita

- Theatrical release poster
- Directed by: Madhumita
- Written by: Madhumita; Nicholas Chevaillier
- Produced by: Shobu Yarlagadda; Prasad Devineni
- Starring: Arjun Das; Sanchana Natarajan; Srishti Singh
- Cinematography: Preetha Jayaraman
- Edited by: Vijay Venkataramanan
- Music by: Mujeeb Majeed; The Artist 404
- Production company: Arka Media Works
- Distributed by: AGS Entertainment
- Release date: 13 November 2026
- Running time: 149 minutes
- Country: India
- Language: Tamil

John Doe is a 2026 Indian Tamil-language psychological crime thriller film directed by Madhumita from a screenplay she wrote with Nicholas Chevaillier and produced by Arka Media Works. The film stars Arjun Das, Sanchana Natarajan and Srishti Singh while Zaara Vineet, Niirav S, Badava Gopi, Karthik Kumar, Anupama Kumar, Jayaprakash and Archana Chandhoke play supporting roles. It follows an SI who investigates a missing child, leading him towards a bigger case.

The film was officially announced in October 2026 under the tentative title ArkaProduction09, denoting Arka's ninth production, and the official title was announced in same month. It has music and background score by Mujeeb Majeed and The Artist 404, cinematography handled by Preetha Jayaraman and editing by Vijay Venkataramanan.

John Doe was released in theatres on 13 November 2026 and received positive reviews from critics.

== Plot ==
SI Chandru takes charge in Kadampuzha, Kerala, where his first major case involves the mysterious death of an unidentified eight-year-old boy classified by authorities as a "John Doe". Across the border in Kurinjipadi, Tamil Nadu, a woman named Darshana relocates from Dubai with her two children, Lakshmi "Lucky" and Hridhay. When young Hridhay suddenly vanishes without a trace, local inspector A. Rao launches a search that soon intersects with Chandru's murder inquiry.

As Chandru and Rao connect clues from both sides of the border, the isolated tragedy spirals into a serial murder investigation tied to 17 other missing children. Throughout the hunt for the killer, Chandru must also overcome deep-seated trauma and self-doubt caused by his abusive police-officer father, turning the effort to give the unidentified victim his name into a personal journey of redemption.

== Cast ==
- Arjun Das as SI Chandru
- Sanchana Natarajan as Inspector A. Rao
- Srishti Singh as Darshana
- Zaara Vineet as Lakshmi "Lucky"
- Niirav S as Hridhay
- Badava Gopi as Chandru's father
- Karthik Kumar as a Dr. Ranjan
- Anupama Kumar as Latha Kurien
- Jayaprakash as Dr. Joseph Shaji Kurien
- Archana Chandhoke as Chandru's mother
- Bhavana Vijayan as Constable Rani

== Production ==
After directing K.D. (2019) and its Hindi remake Kaalidhar Laapata (2025), Madhumita wanted to experiment outside her "comfort zone" of romantic comedies or "feel-good" films. She decided to direct a psychological thriller which later became John Doe. The film, initially titled Sleep Tight, was written by Madhumitha and Nicholas Chevaillier during the COVID-19 lockdown in India. It was produced by Shobu Yarlagadda and Prasad Devineni under Arka Media Works, photographed by Preetha Jayaraman and edited by Vijay Venkataramanan. The film was officially announced to the public in on 16 October 2026 under the tentative title ArkaProduction09, denoting Arka's ninth production, with the final title being announced two days later. It is the Tamil debut of Arka Media Works, not counting the Telugu-Tamil bilingual Baahubali: The Beginning (2015).

== Soundtrack ==
The soundtrack was composed primarily by Mujeeb Majeed, while The Artist 404 is credited for additional music. The audio rights were acquired by Divo. The first single titled "Naan Podhumaa" was released on 28 October 2026. The Artist 404, who made their film debut composing this song, attended a pre-release event for the film masked without revealing their true identity. The second single titled "Address Illa Emotion" was released on 5 November 2026. The last single titled "Re Re Kannamoochi Re Re (Chandru Theme)" was released on 11 November 2026. The entire soundtrack album was released on 14 November 2026, after the film's release.

Track listing
No.	Title	Lyrics	Music	Singer(s)	Length
1.	"Naan Podhumaa"	Arcus Aryian, The Artist 404	The Artist 404	Arjun Das, Malavika	4:13
2.	"Address Illa Emotion"	The Artist 404	The Artist 404	Vijay Narain	3:15
3.	"Re Re Kannamoochi Re Re" (Chandru Theme)	Sabarivaasan Shanmugam, The Artist 404	Mujeeb Majeed	Deepak Blue	2:55
4.	"Mugavari"	Sabarivaasan Shanmugam	Mujeeb Majeed	Athira Janakan	3:26
5.	"Aararo Aarirao"	Sabarivaasan Shanmugam	Mujeeb Majeed	Sindhu Delson	3:29
Total length:					17:18

== Release ==
=== Theatrical ===
John Doe was released on 13 November 2026, which was Friday the 13th. AGS Entertainment distributed the film in Tamil Nadu.

=== Home media ===
The post-theatrical satellite and streaming rights have been acquired by Zee Tamil and Netflix respectively.

== Reception ==
=== Critical response ===
Bhuvanesh Chandar of The Hindu wrote, "Though it mostly gets its casting right, in a whodunit, when you see a familiar face amidst a group of non-actors, you tend to look closer, which spoils the fun. A more experienced genre filmmaker could have done it differently to drive home the fact that anyone can commit crimes" and despite being predictable, "John Doe would compel your attention and keep you hooked throughout its runtime". Akshay Kumar of The New Indian Express wrote, "For the most part, the film is an absorbing thriller. Given how its riveting narrative spends so much time making us wonder about the people inhabiting its world, John Doe deserved a far more satisfying final reckoning". Roopa Radhakrishnan of The Times of India appreciated the cinematography and background score for remaining "firmly in the background, complementing the film without drawing attention to themselves" but felt certain interactions lack naturality, "often making the dialogues feel like an attempt to establish character relationships rather than conversations that organically unfold" and concluded, "A more convincing climax and tighter writing could have made this a far more satisfying investigative thriller".

Vishal Menon of The Hollywood Reporter India wrote, "Despite the hard exterior of an investigative thriller, it's the dramatic moments that reveal the writer's sensitivity [...] What you'd enjoyed so much in the earlier parts of the film, suddenly begin to go missing and a clever drama about bad parenting gets lost in a middling thriller about the most generic of twists". Sreeju Sudhakaran of Rediff.com wrote, "Despite a somewhat predictable central mystery and over-explained antagonist motivations, the film excels in its character development, especially for Chandru and the antagonist". Latha Srinivasan of NDTV wrote, "John Doe has an interesting premise and some good performances, but a tighter screenplay and a more impactful final reveal could have made it a far more engaging thriller". Gayathri Kallukaran of Eastern Eye wrote, "John Doe is more successful as a character-driven crime thriller than as a tightly constructed murder mystery" and praised the performance of the lead actors.
