= Rangammal =

Indian actress

- Died: 29 April 2022(83years); Telungupalayam, Coimbatore District, Annur
- Occupations: actress, sales person
- Years active: 1967 – 2022
- Children: 12

Rangammal K. R. (died 29 April 2022), also known as Rangammal Paati, was an Indian actress who appeared in comedic and supporting roles in Tamil-language films. She acted in over 1,000 films in a career spanning nearly six decades. She shared screen space with different generations of actors.

== Career ==
She began her acting career starring in films which had M. G. Ramachandran in the main lead roles. She initially acted as a junior artist and in minor roles in films and she had acted in films starring opposite MGR and Sivaji Ganesan during the initial phase of her career. She made her acting debut through Vivasayi (1967) directed by M. A. Thirumugam which had MGR in the main male lead role. She appeared in a minor role in her debut film as a dancer in song portion. She made dupe in fight sequences for actresses including Latha and for several other actresses during the early phase of her cinema career. She appeared in a song sequence "Paramasivan Kazhuthil" where she sat alongside J. Jayalalithaa in the film Suryagandhi (1973).

She had a breakthrough role in Seevalaperi Pandi (1994) where she starred in the role as the mother of Napoleon. She appeared in song sequence "Yaaro Yaarodi Unnoda Purushan" in Alai Payuthey (2000) starring opposite Shalini. She then predominantly appeared in several films in comedy sequences regularly featuring alongside prominent comedians Vadivelu and Vivek. She had mostly appeared in films for a short timeframe but had made an impact on the viewers with her comedy performances. Her most notable iconic memorable comedy performance came in Kee Mu (2008) where she collaborated with Vadivelu in a scene involving a stray dog where she says, "porathu than pora appdiye antha naaya shunnu sollitu poppa", "karuppa irukkuravana kadikkathunu ninaichi sonnen". She also made notable performance again collaborating with Vadivelu in a ghost chasing scene in Muniyandi Vilangial Moonramandu (2008). She also featured in comedy roles in films alongside Ganja Karuppu and Santhanam. She played a titular role in the film Paatti (2013) which had its theatrical release in February 2013.

== Biography ==
She hailed from Coimbatore District in Telungupalayam near Annur. She pursued an interest in cinema at young age and she started acting in stage dramas. She was married to Rangasamy who was a police officer. Her husband Rangasamy died on 21 December 1987 and the couple had twelve children in the family including six sons and six daughters.

She returned to her hometown Telungupalayam during the latter part of her life owing to poverty and ageing concerns while it was also reported that her children did not financially support her. During the latter part of her life, she sold handkerchiefs and handicrafts to people at Marina Beach in Chennai for her livelihood as she struggled to cope with the economic situation owing to a lack of film opportunities. Her age was regarded as the prime reason for her being sidelined by filmmakers. However, Rangammal herself claimed that she got inspiration from her idol MGR to work hard in order to earn money and refuted rumors about her being left out by people around her, which propelled her to sell handkerchiefs at the beach.

== Death ==
She died on 29 April 2022 at the age of 83 in Teleguyupalyam, Coimbatore due to age-related ailments. She was very active up until the end of her lifetime, selling items on the beach.

== Selected filmography ==
=== Films ===
- Vivasayi (1967)
- Kaavalkaaran (1967)
- Nam Naadu (1969)
- En Annan (1970)
- Nalla Neram (1972)
- Naan Yen Pirandhen (1972)
- Rajaraja Cholan (1973)
- Suryagandhi (1973)
- Ninaithadhai Mudippavan (1975)
- Needhikku Thalaivanangu (1976)
- Meenava Nanban (1977)
- Padikkadavan (1985)
- Panakkaran (1990)
- Roja (1992)
- Uthama Raasa (1993)
- Seevalaperi Pandi (1994) as Pandi's mother
- Aval Varuvala (1998)
- Rojavanam (1999)
- Alai Payuthey (2000)
- Aai (2004)
- Mercury Pookkal (2006; uncredited)
- Muni (2007)
- Marudhamalai (2007)
- Muniyandi Vilangial Moonramandu (2008)
- Kee Mu (2008)
- Bale Pandiya (2010)
- Magizhchi (2010) as Thiravi's grandaunt
- Kola Kolaya Mundhirika (2010)
- Kanchana (2011)
- Pattathu Yaanai (2013) as K. R. as Gouravam's servant
- Paatti (2013)
- Paranjothi (2015)
- NOTA (2018)
- Pistha (2022)

=== Web series ===
- Putham Pudhu Kaalai Vidiyaadhaa (2022)

=== Short films ===
- Kuttimaa (2013)
- The Yellow Festival (2015)
- Renuka (2018)
- Postman

== See also ==
- Paravai Muniyamma
- Rockstar Ramani Ammal
