= Memu Saitham =

Indian talk show

- Season 2 poster
- మేము సైతం
- Genre: Reality talk show
- Presented by: Lakshmi Manchu
- Country of origin: India
- Original language: Telugu
- No. of seasons: 2
- No. of episodes: 66

Production
- Producer: Lakshmi Manchu
- Production location: Hyderabad
- Camera setup: Multi-camera
- Running time: approx. 40-45 minutes per episode
- Production company: Manchu Telefilms

Original release
- Network: Gemini TV
- Release: 2 April 2016 – 12 August 2018

Related
- Sun Naam Oruvar; Sada Nimmondige

Memu Saitham is an Indian Telugu-language reality social television talk show aired on Gemini TV presented by actress and producer Lakshmi Manchu. The show was produced by Manchu Telefilms. The main concept of this show was celebrities lending their hands to the people who are facing turmoil in their lives in order to help them.

== Concept ==
The celebrities who are part of Tollywood turn themselves into the concept of being common men and women among the society in order to help the people who are facing turmoil in their lives. The celebrities help the needy people by earning money through the course of the show and bring confidence to the people by giving them that money.

== Overview ==
Season	No. of episodes	Airing history
Season 1	39	2 April 2016 – 24 December 2016
Season 2	27	11 February 2018 – 12 August 2018

== Guests included ==
=== Season 1 ===
Episode	Guest(s)
1 (2 April 2016)	Rana & Brahmani
2 (9 April 2016)	Akhil Akkineni
3 (16 April 2016)	Rakul Preeth Singh
4 (23 April 2016)	Mohan Babu
5 (30 April 2016)	Tapsee Pannu
6 (7 May 2016)	Regina Cassandra
7 (14 May 2016)	Srikanth
8 (21 May 2016)	Kajal Agarwal
9 (28 May 2016)	Ravi teja
10 (4 June 2016)	Rashi Khanna
11 (11 June 2016)	Nani
12 (18 June 2016)	Shreya Saran
13 (25 June 2016)	Suma Kanakala
14 (2 July 2016)	Allari Naresh
15 (9 July 2016)	Ali
16 (16 July 2016)	Posani Krishna Murali
17 (23 July 2016)	Sandeep Kishan & Swathi
18 (30 July 2016)	Jayaprada
19 (6 August 2016)	Manchu Vishnu
20 (13 August 2016)	Lavanya Tripathi
21 (20 August 2016)	Aadi Saikumar
22 (27 August 2016)	Sunil
23 (3 September 2016)	Manchu Manoj
24 (10 September 2016)	Navdeep & Pragya Jaiswal
25 (17 September 2016)	Raj Tarun & Nikhil
26 (24 September 2016)	Samantha Akkineni
27 (1 October 2016)	Tanikella Bharani
28 (8 October 2016)	Naga Chaitanya
29 (15 October 2016)	Pranitha Subhash
30 (22 October 2016)	Sai Dharam Tej
31 (29 October 2016)	Charmy Kaur
32 (5 November 2016)	Sumanth
33 (12 November 2016)	Vijaya Nirmala
34 (19 November 2016)	Sudheer Babu
35 (26 November 2016)	Priyamani
36 (3 December 2016)	Jayasudha
37 (10 December 2016)	Naresh
38 (17 December 2016)	Koratala Siva
39 (24 December 2016)	Nagarjuna

=== Season 2 ===
Episode	Guest(s)
1 (11 February 2018)	Success story of season 1
2 (18 February 2018)	Anushka Shetty
3 (25 February 2018)	Rakul Preeth Singh
4 (4 March 2018)	Naga Shaurya
5 (11 March 2018)	Jayasudha & Naveen
6 (18 March 2018)	Catherine Tressa
7 (25 March 2018)	Hebah Patel
8 (1 April 2018)	Boyapati Srinu
9 (8 April 2018)	Allu Sirish
10 (15 April 2018)	Mohan Babu
11 (22 April 2018)	Nivetha Thomas
12 (29 April 2018)	Keerthy Suresh
13 (6 May 2018)	Sundeep Kishan
14 (13 May 2018)	Ram charan
15 (20 May 2018)	Ritu Varma & Tharun Bhaskar
16 (27 May 2018)	Rithika singh
17 (3 June 2018)	Anjali
18 (10 June 2018)	Nani
19 (17 June 2018)	Suma Kanakala & Rajeev Kanakala
20 (24 June 2018)	Mehreen Kaur
21 (1 July 2018)	Renu Desai
22 (8 July 2018)	Renuka Chowdary
23 (15 July 2018)	Shalini Pandey
24 (22 July 2018)	Surabhi
25 (29 July 2018)	Rajashekar & Jeevitha
26 (5 August 2018)	Seerath Kapoor & Siddhu
27 (12 August 2018)	Tamannaah Bhatia

== Adaptations ==
Language	Title	Host	Network(s)	Airing history
Tamil	Sun Naam Oruvar	Vishal	Sun TV	7 October 2018 – 13 January 2019
Kannada	Sada Nimmondige	Lakshmi	Udaya TV	15 July 2018 – 13 January 2019
