= Kola Kolaya Mundhirika =

- Film poster
- Directed by: Madhumitha
- Written by: Madhumitha; Crazy Mohan (dialogue)
- Produced by: Nalini Sundar Raman; Trisakti Sundar Raman
- Starring: Jayaram; Karthik Kumar; Shikha; Anandaraj; Pandiarajan; M. S. Bhaskar
- Cinematography: L. K. Vijay
- Edited by: Vijay Venkataramanan
- Music by: V. Selvaganesh
- Production company: Giriguja Films International
- Release date: 21 May 2010
- Country: India
- Language: Tamil

Kola Kolaya Mundhirika (transl. Bunches and Bunches of Cashew Fruit) is a 2010 Indian Tamil-language comedy film co-written and directed by Madhumitha. The film stars Jayaram, Karthik Kumar, and Shikha along with numerous popular Tamil comedy artists including M. S. Bhaskar, Pandiarajan, Anandaraj, Vasu Vikram and Vaiyapuri playing supporting roles. It was released on 21 May 2010.

== Plot ==
A rich man asks his trusty colleague to help him hide some priceless diamonds inside a chair. The rich man dies, and the chair goes missing – it is now up to the colleague to try and retrieve it. Unfortunately, trying to get their hands on the chair are also two thieves, three con men, and a whole host of other characters.

== Cast ==
- Jayaram as Inspector Mathrubhootham
- Karthik Kumar as Krish
- Shikha as Veni
- Radha Ravi as Dada Thulukkanam
- Anandaraj as Veerappan
- M. S. Bhaskar as Santhanam
- Pandiarajan as Advocate Madan
- Delhi Ganesh as Ganesan
- Vasu Vikram as Kittu
- T. M. Karthik as Dilli
- Vaiyapuri as Constable Rajappan
- "Eeramana Rojave" Siva as Jamindar
- Devadarshini as Jamindar's wife
- Master Ashwin as Young Krish
- V. S. Raghavan as Masilamani, retired jailor
- Sathish as Raju
- Crane Manohar as Thief
- Kuyili as Gomathi
- Neelu as Thirumalachari
- Rangammal as Kolam Lady
- Kadugu Ramamoorthy as Bank Customer
- Crazy Mohan as Deaf Judge (special appearance)
- Sarath Kumar as Karan Muthiah (Cameo appearance)

== Soundtrack ==
Music was composed by V. Selvaganesh.

Track listing
No.	Title	Singer(s)	Length
1.	"Aasaimachane"	Shankar Mahadevan, Anuradha Sriram
2.	"Oru Varam"	S. P. Balasubrahmanyam, K. S. Chithra
3.	"Notta Kudu"	Karthik, Suchitra
4.	"Ada Engengum"	Benny Dayal, Kalpana
5.	"Pootti Vaitha Vairam"	Maya

== Critical reception ==
Sify wrote, "KKM is jolly good fun ride as the director takes us on a treasure hunt, with an adorable lead pair and great supporting actors who will have you in splits. A welcome relief from those larger-than-life heroes, mindless action, this comedy caper is a silly yet surprisingly enjoyable film about misunderstandings and mistaken identities". Rediff.com wrote, "Madhumita's Vallamai Tharayo might have been a dull reworking of Mani Ratnam's Mouna Ragam, but her attempt at comedy sparkles." The Hindu wrote, "This family entertainer banks heavily on some classic Crazy Mohan one-liners and PJs hurled at the audience almost relentlessly in its pursuit of the laugh-a-minute promise."
