= T. K. Murthy =

Indian musician (born 1924)

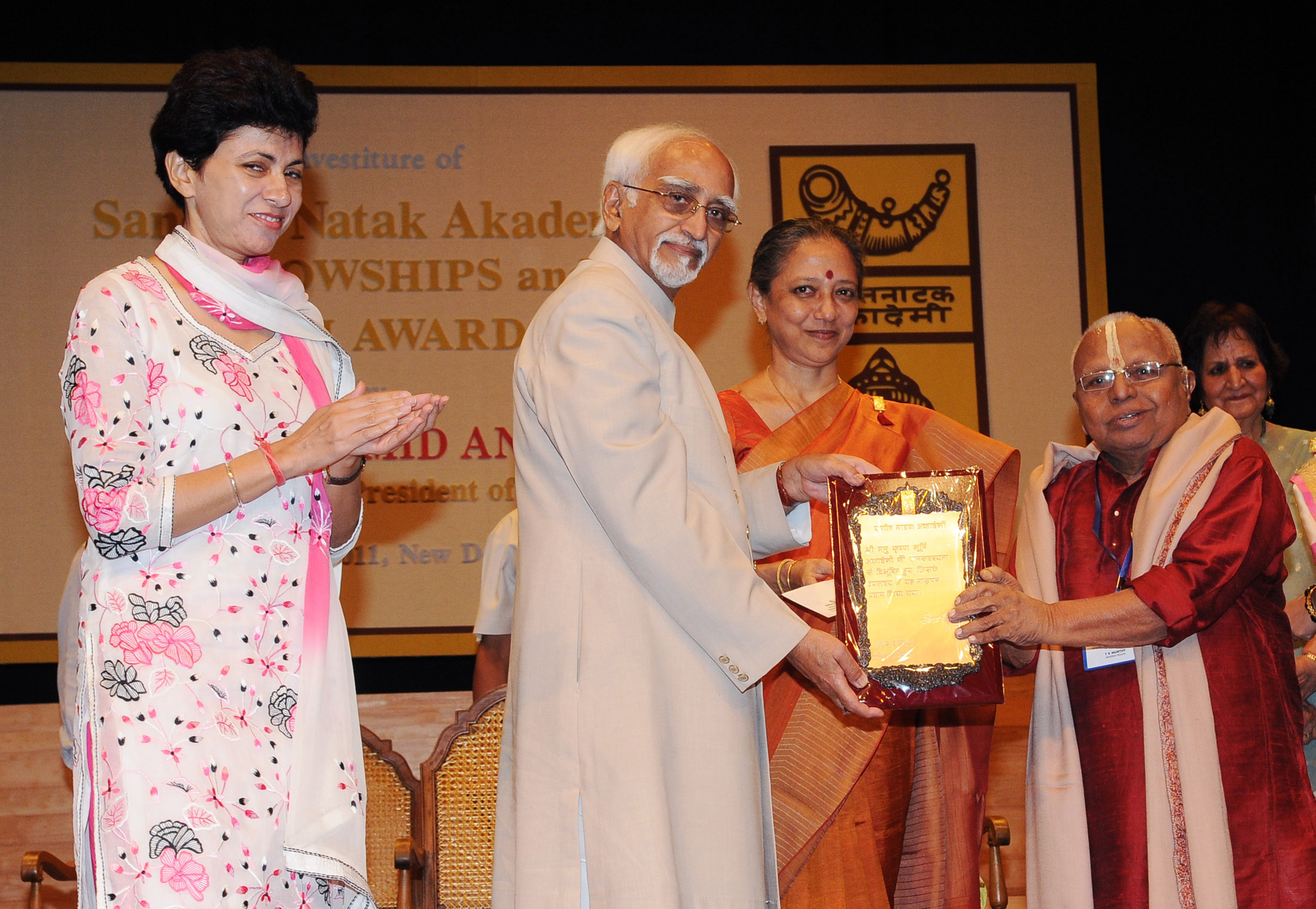
- Hamid Ansari presenting the Sangeet Natak Akademi Fellowship-2010 to the Mridangam vidwan T. K. Murthy, at the investiture ceremony of the Sangeet Natak Akademi Fellowships and Sangeet Natak Akademi Awards-2010

Background information
- Also known as: TKM, Chittu, Krishna Murthy
- Born: 13 August 1924 (age 102)
- Genre: Carnatic music
- Instruments: Mridangam, Konakkol
- Years active: 1934–present
- Website: T K Murthy

Thanu Krishna Murthy (born 13 August 1924), better known as T. K. Murthy, is an Indian Mridangam player. Murthy is a recipient of the Padma Shri and Sangeetha Kalanidhi awardee awards.

== Personal life ==
Thanu Krishna Murthy was born on 13 August 1924 to Thanu Bhagavathar and Annapurni.He belonged to Seevalaperi of Palayamkottai, Tamil Nadu. His pet name was ‘sittu’, after the sparrow — small, alert and dynamic. His father, a Carnatic musician, began teaching him music at the age of three, recognizing his interest in percussion instruments. He was given a Mridangam by his mother, Annapurni, and began taking lessons from his elder brother, Gopalakrishnan. Murthy later received formal training from Thanjavur Vaidyanatha Iyer(Vaitha), the founder of the Thanjavur style of Mridangam. Under Iyer's guidance, Murthy traveled to Tanjore for advanced training alongside Palghat Mani Iyer and Thambuswami (the brother of Carnatic vocalist T. M. Thiagarajan). Murthy made his debut at the age of 12 in Coimbatore at a concert of Musiri Subramania Iyer, with Karur Chinnaswami Iyer on the violin and Tanjore Vaidyanatha Iyer on the mridangam. His talent caught the attention of M. S. Subbulakshmi, who chose him as her accompanist for over 40 years, performing together across the USA, Europe, the Edinburgh Festival, and the United Nations.

Murthy came from a lineage of court musicians and was the fifth generation in his family to pursue music. The family's musical heritage extends across seven generations. His son, T.K. worked as a music composer at All India Radio. and his grandson, Karthikeya Murthy, is a film score composer. ‘Mrudanga Chakravarthy Dr T K Murthy School of Music and Trust’ was formed to provide scholarships to deserving students.

== Recognition ==
Murthy's honors and awards include:

- Kerala Sangeetha Nataka Akademi Fellowship in 1989
- Sangeet Natak Academy Fellowship, 2010 (See List of Sangeet Natak Akademi fellows § List of fellows)
- Padma Shri by the Government of India, 2017
- Mahaguru (The great Mridangam Master) from TSN's Percussive Arts Centre Inc (TSNPAC), New Jersey in 2022
