= S. P. Charan =

Indian actor, singer, film producer

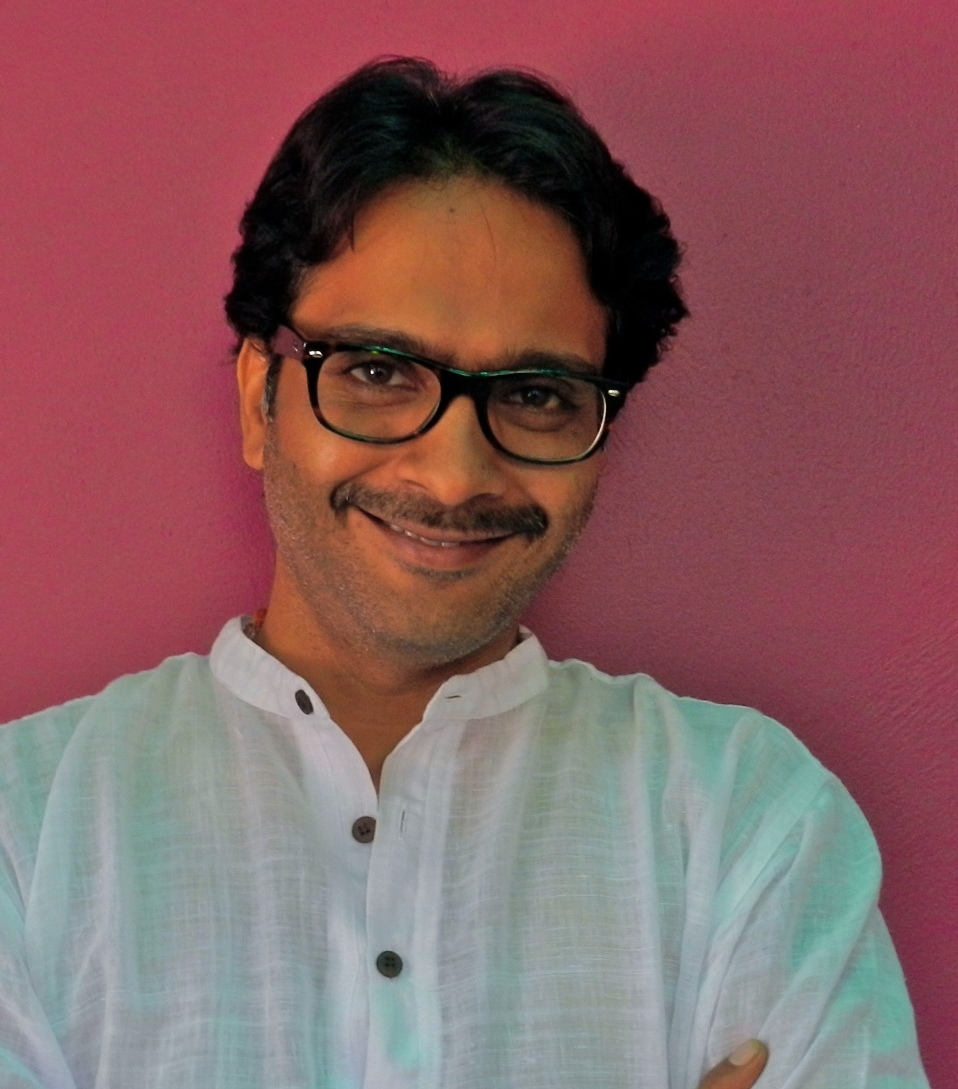
- Born: Sripathi Panditharadhyula Charan; 7 January 1972 (age 54); Madras (present-day Chennai), Tamil Nadu, India
- Occupations: Singer; actor; producer
- Years active: 1997–present
- Parents: S. P. Balasubrahmanyam (father); Savithri (mother)
- Relatives: S. P. Sailaja (Aunt); Subhalekha Sudhakar (Uncle)

Sripathi Panditharadhyula Balasubrahmanyam Charan, credited as S. P. B. Charan, is an Indian playback singer and actor who works predominantly works in Tamil cinema and Telugu cinema.

He is the son of the singer S. P. Balasubrahmanyam. He first worked as a playback singer in Tamil and Telugu. He made his acting debut in Maha Edabidangi (1999) and is best known for his performance in the Saroja (2008). He has established the film production company Capital Film Works, and produced Chennai 600028 (2007), Aaranya Kaandam (2012) and others.

== Early life ==
Sripathi Panditaradhyula Charan was born to the singer S. P. Balasubrahmanyam and his wife Savitri in a Telugu family on 7 January 1972. He was raised in Chennai, India. He studied at Asan Memorial School, Chennai, where actor Ajith Kumar also studied and was a school friend. He received a bachelor's degree in business administration from Pace University in New York, United States in 1994 and completed a two-year course in film and television.

== Career ==
Charan began working as a playback singer in 1997 with "Deepangal Pesum" from Devathai, with music composed by Ilaiyaraaja. About being the son of an icon, he stated: "my voice sounds so much like appa, people might not want to use a similar voice. When SPB himself is rocking, why would composers need his clone?". He has sung for composers M. M. Keeravani, A. R. Rahman and Devi Sri Prasad. Charan's most popular songs include "Nagila Nagila" from Alai Payuthey, "Mellaga" from Varsham, "Nenu Nenuga Lene" from Manmadhudu, "I Love you Shailaja" from Mazhai, "Please Sir" from Boys, "Maaja Maaja" from Sillunu Oru Kaadhal, "Oru Nanban Irundhal" from Enakku 20 Unakku 18, "O Shanti" from Vaaranam Aayiram, "Nee Naan" from Mankatha. In 2010, he recorded a song in Kadhal 2 Kalyanam, composed by Yuvan Shankar Raja. He also recorded alongside his father for the first time in Aadukalam, for which they both won the Vijay Award for Best Male Playback Singer.

Charan first acted with his father in a film called Maha Yedabidangi, directed by K. S. L. Swamy, but the film was not released. Balachander's son Kailasam approached him to act in the television show Oonjal, produced by K. Balachander and directed by Sundar K. Vijayan. It was followed by Radan's Annamalai. He also starred in a TV serial named Bommaigal in Tamil and Akka Chellulu in Telugu. His first release was the Kannada film Hudugigagi in 2003, directed by B. Manjunath. In 2008, he played one of the lead roles in Venkat Prabhu's Saroja. On his performance, Sify wrote: "S.P.B Charan as Jagapathy Babu suits the role and is fantastic". He acted in Va, in which he played Shiva's prospective brother-in-law. He acted in two Tamil films Vanavarayan Vallavarayan and Vizhithiru.

=== Other works ===
Charan established the film production company Capital Film Works, in 2002. Their first production was Unnai Charanadainthen, in which Charan played the lead role, alongside his friend Venkat Prabhu. The film, which notably featured musical score by Charan's father, Balasubrahmanyam, received four Tamil Nadu State Film Awards. Charan revealed that he decided to produce the film after hearing Samuthirakani's narration. He further produced the Jayam Ravi-starrer Mazhai (2005), a remake of the Telugu film Varsham, which was a failure at the box office. His next production was Venkat Prabhu's directorial debut Chennai 600028 (2007), featured eleven newcomers in the lead and became one of the year's most successful Tamil films. In 2011, his sixth production Aaranya Kaandam, was released to critical acclaim and became noted for getting 52 cuts by the regional Central Board of Film Certification. Although it did not achieve the expected box office success, Charan won a National Film Award as a producer of the film. His next production was Thirudan Police, by another debutant, Caarthick Raju.

SP Charan designed and produced SPB50 concert tour with his father SP Balasubrahmanyam and was felicitated for his 50 years of journey in the industry. The concert tour held in Toronto, Russia, Sri Lanka, Malaysia, Singapore, Dubai and few places in the United States like Seattle, Los Angeles, New Jersey. Other singers like KS Chithra, Kalpana Raghavendra, SP Sailaja were part of the series.

Starting from Dubai expo 2020, SP Charan has been part of Ilayaraaja's shows and has accompanied him in various other shows that has been conducted in United Kingdom, the US, Australia, Singapore, Malaysia, Muscat and in various cities in India including Yuva Dasara Mysore 2024.

As a tribute to his father, he toured "Simply SPB" in 2023 and performed in various venues across the United States in many of the same venues where his father had performed before. Singers SP Sailaja, Sai Vignesh and Srisha were part of the series. An event in the series also happened in Bangalore, where singers in the Kannada industry, including Rajesh Krishnan, VijayaPrakash, Anuradha Bhat, also performed.

In June 2025, on the occasion of Lal Salam movie release in OTT platform Sun Nxt, the music director AR Rahman published in his social media handles that, SP Charan's song 'Ena senji Ena senji ena valaccha" will be part of this release version.

In 2025, he has been part of stage shows performed by music director Deva in India and Australia along with Srikanth Deva, Anuradha Sriram.

== Personal life ==
In 1996, he and childhood friends Venkat Prabhu and Premgi Amaren set up a music band called Next Generation, which also had Yugendran and Thaman as members.

Charan underwent a weight loss in late 2010. In response to speculation, he stated it was in response to becoming health-conscious.

== Filmography ==
=== Film ===
==== As actor ====
Year	Title	Role	Language	Notes
1999	Maha Edabidangi		Kannada	
2003	Hudugigagi	Prasad	Kannada	
2003	Unnai Charanadainthen	Nandha	Tamil	
2004	Naalo		Telugu	
2007	Nyabagam Varuthe	Babu	Tamil	
2008	Saroja	Jagapathi Babu	Tamil	
2010	Drohi	Venkat	Tamil	Guest appearance
2010	Va	Marthandan	Tamil	
2013	Ayo Na lIinga		Tamil	Short film
2014	Vanavarayan Vallavarayan	Siva	Tamil	
2015	Moodu Mukkallo Cheppalante	Muddu Krishna	Telugu	Bilingual film; Guest appearance
2015	Moone Moonu Varthai	Sethuraman	Tamil	Bilingual film; Guest appearance
2017	Vizhithiru	Saravanan	Tamil	
2021	Tamil Rockers		Tamil	
2025	LYF: Love Your Father	Kishore	Telugu	
2025	Patang	Sekhar	Telugu	

==== As producer ====
Year	Title	Notes
2003	Unnai Charanadainthen	Debut as producer
2005	Mazhai	
2007	Chennai 600028	
2009	Kunguma Poovum Konjum Puravum	
2010	Naanayam	
2011	Aaranya Kaandam	
2014	Thirudan Police	
2015	Moone Moonu Varthai	
2016	Chennai 600028 II	

==== As dubbing artist ====
Year	Title	Language	Dubbed for
2003	Boys	Telugu	Siddarth

=== Television ===
Year	Title	Role	Network	Language	Notes	Ref.
1999	Oonjal		Vijay TV	Tamil		
2001	Aataina Paataina	Host	ETV	Telugu		
2001	Idho Boopalam		Raj TV	Tamil		
2001	Sayyam Ponavargal		Raj TV	Tamil		
2002	Annamalai / Sivayya	Ulaganathan	Sun TV / Gemini TV	Tamil / Telugu		
	Akka Chellellu		Gemini TV	Telugu		
	Bommaigal			Tamil		
2014–2015	Nenjathai Killaadhe	Murali	Zee Tamil	Tamil		
2018	Super Singer Junior 6	Judge	Vijay TV	Tamil		
2015–present	Swarabhishekam	Performer	ETV	Telugu		
2021	Ede Thumbi Haaduvenu	Guest judge	Colors Kannada	Kannada		
2021	Star Singer 8	Guest performer	Asianet	Malayalam		
2021	Super Singer Junior 8	Judge	Vijay TV	Tamil		
2021–present	Padutha Theeyaga	Presenter	ETV	Telugu		
2022	Bhale Manchi Roju	Performer	ETV	Telugu		
2022	Fall	Rohit Selvakumar	Disney+ Hotstar	Tamil	Also producer	
2022	Mad Company	Amaran	Aha	Tamil		
2024	Sa Re Ga Ma Pa Li'l Champs 4	Judge	Zee Tamil	Tamil		
2025	Family Stars	Guest performer	ETV	Telugu		
2025	Sa Re Ga Ma Pa Seniors 5	Judge	Zee Tamil	Tamil		
2025	ETV 30-Year Celebration	Guest performer	ETV	Telugu		
2025	Sa Re Ga Ma Pa Li'l Champs 5	Judge	Zee Tamil	Tamil		

== Discography ==
=== Tamil ===
Film	Song	Composer(s)	Co-singer(s)	Notes
Darling, Darling, Darling	"Oh Nenje"	Sankar Ganesh	S. P. Balasubrahmanyam, S.P. Pallavi, S.P Vasantha, Pallavi	Lyrics by Karuvikkarambai Shanmugam
Punniyavathi	"Unakkoruthi"	Illayaraja	Sunitha	Unreleased movie
Sundari Neeyum Sundaran Naanum	"Bagunnara"	Deva	Yugendran	
Devathai	"Deepangal Pesum"	Illayaraja	Sandhya & KP Mohan	
Kanmani oru Kavithai	Neenga Partha Ulagam	Illayaraja	Swarnalatha	
Nila Kaalam	"Aathangarayila Koothu"	Bharani		
Pasapookal	"Panu Pennai"	TJ Christy		
Maayavi	"Kadavul Thandha"	Devi Sri Prasad	Kalpana	
Saroja	"Aaja Meri Soniye"	Yuvan Shankar Raja	Premji Amaren, Vijay Yesudas	
Goa	"Adidaa Nayaandiyaa"	Yuvan Shankar Raja	Yugendran	
Aadukalam	"Ayyayo Nenju"	G. V. Prakash Kumar	S. P. Balasubrahmanyam, Prashanthini	
Azhagana Naatkal	"Chik Chik Chinna"	Deva	Sujatha	
Adhi Narayana	"Happy New Year"	Srikanth Deva	Preethi	
Tharagu	"Hey Vaada"	Bharani	Sadhana Sargam	
Inidhu Inidhu Kadhal Inidhu	"Inithu Inithu"	Devi Sri Prasad	Sumangali	
Rishi	"Jumbo"	Yuvan Shankar Raja	Sujatha	
Murari (D)	"Enge Enge"	Mani Sharma	Harini	
Kungama Poovum Konjum Puravum	"Kadaloram"	Yuvan Shankar Raja		
Alai Payuthey	"Kadhal Sadugudu"	A. R. Rahman		
Sillunu Oru Kadhal	"Maja Maja"	A. R. Rahman	Shreya Ghoshal	
Mazhai	"Mannile"	Devi Sri Prasad	Sumangali	
Mankatha	"Nee Naan"	Yuvan Shankar Raja	Bhavatharini	
Vaaranam Aayiram	"Oh Shanthi"	Harris Jayaraj	Clinton	
Enakku 20 Unakku 18	"Oru Nanban"	A. R. Rahman	Chinmayi	
India Pakistan	"Oru Ponna Parthein Mama"	Deena Devarajan		
Boys	"Please Sir"	A. R. Rahman	Chinmayi, Clinton, Kunal	
Chennai 600028	"Yaro Yarukkul"	Yuvan Shankar Raja	Venkat Prabhu, S. P. Balasubrahmanyam	
Kadhal 2 Kalyanam	"Vellaikodi"	Yuvan Shankar Raja		
Udhayam NH4	"Maalai Pon Maalai"	G V Prakash Kumar	Bela Shende	
Pannaiyarum Padminiyum	"Enakkaaga Poranthaayae"	Justin Prabhakaran	Anu Anand	
Love Express	"Kadhal Ennum"	Gnani		
Thirudan Police	"Dheivam"	Yuvan Shankar Raja		
Vaazhthukal	"Unmela Aasapattu"	Yuvan Shankar Raja	Anuradha Sriram	
Maaran	"Felomina Ni Enthan"	Deva	S. P. Balasubrahmanyam, Mathangi	
Student Number 1 (D)	"Vizhamale irukka mudiyuma"	M. M. Keeravani	K. S. Chithra	
Moone Moonu Varthai	"Pa Paba Pa"	Karthikeya Murthy	Mukesh	
Moone Moonu Varthai	"Ketta News"	Karthikeya Murthy	Ilaiyaraja	
Naan Pon Ondru Kanden	"Adiyae Enna Viraga"	Azhagar Ponraj		
Annakodi	"Porale"	G V Prakash Kumar	Manasi MM	
M.S. Dhoni: The Untold Story (D)	"Ulagam engum Dhoni Yee"	Rochak Kohli		
Putham Pudhu Kaalai	"Oho endhan Baby"	G V Prakash Kumar	Bhavani Sre	
Putham Pudhu Kaalai	"Manmadhan Naan Dhaana"	G V Prakash Kumar		
Appu	"Punnagaiku"	Deva	Sukhwander singh, Anupama deshpande	
Anandham	"Choodithandha"	SA Rajkumar	Yugendran, Unni Menon, Sujatha	
Nilave Vaa	"Chandira Mandalathai"	Vidyasagar	Vijay, Harini	
Arasiyal	"Varai En thozhiyae"	Vidyasagar	Harini, Shubha Mudgal	
Magalirkkaga	"Kosuvam Sorugi"	Varshan	Swarnalatha	
Aathi Narayana	"Thiruvizha (Happy New year)"	Srikanth Deva	Preethi, Samyuktha	
Savaale Samali	"Penne Penne"	Thaman		
Sonna Puriyathu	"Kaaliyana Saalayil"	Yatish Mahadev	Chinmayi	
Nalanum Nandhiniyum	"Vaadagai Koodu"	Ashwath Naganathan	Shreya Ghosal	
Moodar Koodam	"Achamillai"	Natarajan Sankaran		
Moodar Koodam	"Oru Oorula"	Natarajan Sankaran		
Thozha	"Oru Nayagan"	Premji Amaran	Venkat Prabhu, Premji Amaren	Remix
Kallazhagar	"Oh Manalea"	Deva	Anuradha Sriram	
Seerivarum Kaalai	"Raathiri Nadu Raathiri"	Sirpy	Harini	
Akilandakodi Brahmandanayagan (D)	"Kamaniyam Suba Ramaniyam"	Maragathamani		
Jairam (D)	"Oh Manase"	Anup Rubens		
Gajendra	"Unnai Partha"	Deva	Sharmila	
Meyyazhagi	"Empaera"	SP Abhishek	Chinmayi	
Unakkaga Ellam Unakkaga	"Thulli Thuli"	Yuvan Shankar Raja	Sujatha Mohan	
Kannan Varuvan	"Kooda Mela Koodu Vechi"	Sirpy	Chithra, Yugendran	
Live Telecast (Web Series)	"Naam Indru"	Premgi		
Kutty Story - Lokham	"Nee Puthiradi"	Premgi		
Adida Melam	"Mangkuyilea Punkuyilae	Abhishek	Padmapriya	
Pottu Amman	"Vennilave Vennilave"	S. D. Shanthakumar	Devi Kunjarambal, Harini, Kalpana, Swarnalatha	
Anbarivu	"Thanga Sela"	Hiphop Tamizha		
Sita Ramam (D)	"Hey Sita"	Vishal chandrasekhar	Sinduri	
Kodai	Nalladhey Nadakkum	Subash Kavi		
Chandramukhi 2	"Mourniye"	M. M. Keeravani	Harika Narayanan	
Buildup	"OttiVaarene"	Ghibran Vaibodha		
Rathnam	"Ethanaala" (Version II)"	Devi Sri Prasad		Lyrics by Viveka
Raghu Thatha	"Poruthhiru Selva"	Sean Roldan		
Kalki 2898 AD	"Keshava Madhava" (Wait of Ashwatthama)	Santhosh Narayanan		
Kozhipannai Chelladurai	"Yelay Yelay"	N. R. Raghunanthan		
Saindhav	"Pooraname"	Santhosh Narayanan		
Tourist Family	"Vaazhndhu Paaru"	Sean Roldan		Lyrics by Mohan Rajan
Madras Matinee	"Kai Mel Nilavai"	K.C.Balasarangan		Lyrics by Snehan
Lal Salaam	"Ena Senji Ena Senji"	A R Rahman		Released in SunNXt
School	"Comparison Pannamale"	Ilayaraja	Swetha Mohan, Haricharan, Srisha Vijayasekar, Priya Mali	Seetha payanam Vazhvin payaname

=== Telugu ===
Year	Film	Song	Composer(s)	Co-singer(s)
1988	Vivaha Bhojanambu	"Jum Tanana"	S.P.Balasubramanian	
1997	Kurralla Rajyam	"Pe Pe Pelandi"	Vandemataram Srinivas	Mano, Murali
1997	Kurralla Rajyam	"Kusti Patee"	Vandemataram Srinivas	Mano, Murali
1997	Kurralla Rajyam	"Osi Pillo"	Vandemataram Srinivas	Swarnalatha
1997	V.I.P	"Rekkalu Vachina"	Ranjit Barot	Harini
1997	Aho Brahma Oho Sishya	"Peeche Personality"	Sasi Preetam	
1998	Daddy Daddy	"Love Paatalu"	Vandemataram Srinivas	SPB
1998	Daddy Daddy	"Andhamaina Guvvalu"	Vandemataram Srinivas	SPB
1998	Swarnakka	"Thumparla Thumparla"	Vandemataram Srinivas	
1998	Swarnakka	"Eelo Eennello"	Vandemataram Srinivas	
1998	Jolly	"Mustabayye Muddlula Gumma"	Kavi	
2000	Chiru Navvutho	"Ninnala Monnala"	Mani Sharma	
2000	Sakhi (D)	"Kailove Chedugudu"	A. R. Rahman	Naveen
2000	Annayya	"Bava Chandamamalu"	Mani Sharma	SPB, K. S. Chithra
2000	Yuvakudu	"Maikam Kadidi"	Mani Sharma	
2000	Thenali	"Poredabatai"	A. R. Rahman	S.P Pallavi
2000	Thenali	"Thenali"	A. R. Rahman	
2000	Premani Cheppara (D)	"O Pilla Rasagulla"	Rajesh Roshan	Parthasarathi, Harini
2000	Premani Cheppara (D)	Gayaale Geyaalai	Rajesh Roshan	
2000	Premani Cheppara (D)	Yededo Avuthunnadi	Rajesh Roshan	Harini
2000	Premani Cheppara (D)	Premakai Puttanu	Rajesh Roshan	Harini
2000	Rupaayi	Bharatha Desam	Mani Sharma	
2000	Rupaayi	Computer Computer	Mani Sharma	
2001	Nuvvu Nenu	"Priyathama"	R. P. Patnaik	Usha
2001	Murari	"Ekkada Ekkada"	Mani Sharma	Harini
2001	12B (D)	"O Punami Puvva"	Harris Jayaraj	Gopika Poornima
2001	Manasantha Nuvve	"Cheppave Prema"	R. P. Patnaik	Sujatha Mohan
2001	Chirujallu	Hai Rama		S.P.B, Sujatha Mohan
2001	Naalo Unna Prema	"Veeche Chirugaali"	Koti	
2001	Pandanti Samsaram	"Hello Naa Cheli"	Vandemataram Srinivas	Harini
2001	Darling Darling	"Vandamandi Brahmalanta"	Koti	Ganga
2001	Apuroopam	"Hyderabad babu"	Chakri	
2002	Manamiddaram	"Cheppaleni andalenno"	Koti	
2002	Kalusukovalani	"Tala Talamani"	Devi Sri Prasad	Harini
2002	Takkari Donga	"Bagundammo"	Mani Sharma	Usha
2002	Manmadhudu	"Nenu Nenuga Lene"	Devi Sri Prasad	
2002	O Chinadana	"Vonti Meeda Pattu Koka"	Vidyasagar	Mano, Sujatha Mohan, Swarnalatha
2002	Thotti Gang	"Nuvve Kaavali"	Devi Sri Prasad	Sumangali
2002	Sreeram	"Monalisa"	R. P. Patnaik	
2002	Sreeram	"Chinna Chitunavvutoti"	R. P. Patnaik	Usha
2002	Okato Number Kurradu	"Orey Nuvvu Naaku"	M. M. Keeravani	K. S. Chithra
2003	Ee Abbai Chala Manchodu	"Kanipinchaavamma"	M. M. Keeravani	
2003	Gangotri	"Railu Bandi Railu"	M. M. Keeravani	Ganga
2003	Gangotri	"Oka Thotalo Oka Kommalo"	M. M. Keeravani	Malavika
2003	Gangotri	"Ganga Nijanga"	M. M. Keeravani	Sunitha
2003	Kalyana Ramudu	"Sitakokamma"	Mani Sharma	Shankar Mahadevan
2003	Neeku Nenu Naaku Nuvvu	"Telugu Bhasha"	R. P. Patnaik	
2003	Evare Athagadu	"Ee Jagame Oka Aakasham"	Mani Sharma	
2003	Evare Athagadu	"Evaramma Athagadu"	Mani Sharma	Sri Vardhini
2003	Ninne Ishtapaddanu	"I Love You"	R. P. Patnaik	Kousalya
2003	Simhadri	"Cheema Cheema"	M. M. Keeravani	Ganga
2003	Simhadri	"Chiraku Anuko"	M. M. Keeravani	K. S. Chithra
2003	Boys (D)	"Please Sir"	A. R. Rahman	Kunal Ganjawala, Chinmayi
2003	Chantigadu	"Chirugalilaa"	Vandemataram Srinivas	Usha
2003	Maa Alludu Very Good	"Muthyala Pallakilo"	M. M. Keeravani	K. S. Chithra
2003	Maa Alludu Very Good	"Mavagaru Pilla Nachindi"	M. M. Keeravani	SPB, Pallavi
2003	Seetayya	"Adhishankarula"	M. M. Keeravani	Sunitha
2003	Taarak	"Vennela Kala"	Mani Sharma	
2003	Ori Nee Prema Bangaram Kaanu	"Swagathama"	Mani Sharma	
	Goodachari No 1	Tholi prema	Pravin Mani	Gopika Poornima
2004	Tapana	"Gundello Penchukunna"	Shambu Prasad	Usha
2004	Gudumba Shankar	"Chiguraaku Chatu Chiluka"	Mani Sharma	Sunitha
2004	Gudumba Shankar	"Emantaro"	Mani Sharma	Harini
2004	Varsham	"Mellaga Karagani"	Devi Sri Prasad	Sumangali
2004	Yagnam	"Em Chesavo Naa Manasu"	Mani Sharma	Shreya Ghoshal
2004	Samba	"Tagilanidi Rabba"	Mani Sharma	Ganga
2004	Samba	"Nandamuri Chandamama"	Mani Sharma	Sujatha Mohan
2004	Manmadha (D)	"Kadanna Preme"	Yuvan Shankar Raja	
2004	Sakhiya	"Vaana Vatsayana"	Mani Sharma	Sunitha
2004	Ammayi Bagundi	"Ammayi Bagundi"	M. M. Srilekha	
2004	Arjun	"Aey Pilla"	Mani Sharma	Shreya Ghoshal
2004	Athade Oka Sainyam	"August Padihedu"		Sunitha
2004	Vidyardhi	"Oke Okkasari"	Mani Sharma	
2004	Shatruvu	"Only U"	Madhukar	Sunitha
2004	Idho Taareeku	"Manasa Manasa"	Vandemataram Srinivas	Usha
2004	Idho Taareeku	"Santhoshamga"	Vandemataram Srinivas	Nishma
2004	Kala	"Maru Mallechendu"	Oruganti Dharmateja	Febi
2004	No	"College Kanne Pettaroi"	Pappu	
2005	Allari Bullodu	"Andhamante Evaridi"	M. M. Keeravani	Sunitha
2005	Avunanna Kadanna	"Gudi Gantala"	R. P. Patnaik	Usha
2005	Dhairyam	"Neetho Cheppana"	Anup Rubens	Sravani
2005	Modati Cinema	"Jallu Manada"	Swaraj	Sunitha
2005	Relax	"Tholakarivo Kalavo"	Ramana Gogula	
2006	Shock	"Nee Venta Nene"	Ajay–Atul	Kousalya
2006	Happy	"Yegire Mabbulalona" (Version l)	Yuvan Shankar Raja	
2006	Nuvvu Nennu Prema (D)	"Maja Maja Maaja"	A. R. Rahman	Shreya Ghoshal
2006	Sri Ramadasu	"Chaalu Chaalu"	M. M. Keeravani	Sunitha
2006	Roommates	"Haire Haire Sarigama"	Mani Sharma	
2006	Dongodi Pelli	"All Andhra"	S.Raj Kiran	
2007	Maharajasri	"Suppose Nenu Puttakunte"	M.M.Keeravani	
2007	Chennai 600028/Kodithe Kottalira	"Evaro"(Friendship)	Yuvan shankar Raja	
2007	Brahma	Naaku Nuvvunte Chalu	Krishna Sai	K.S.Chithra
2007	State rowdy	Telusa Telusa	MM Srilekha	K.S.Chithra
2008	Swagatam	"Okarikokaru"	R. P. Patnaik	Madhushree
2008	Surya s/o Krishnan (D)	"Om Shanti Shanti"	Harris Jayaraj	Kriss
2008	Maa Vaadu	"Vacha Vacha"	Yuvan shankar Raj	Sumangali
2008	Ontari	"Cheppalanundhi"	Mani Sharma	
2008	Karthikamasam	Nevu Leni Vela	Lakshmi Vinayak	Chinmayee
2008	Bhuma	Changubhalaa Chandrakala	Vandemataram Srinivas	K.S.Chithra
2008	Mr.Medhavi	"Neeli Kanula Chinadana"	Chakri	Kousalya
2008	Saroja(D)	"Aaja Meri Soniye"	Yuvan Shankar Raja	
2008	Naa Anevadu	"Chilakamma Rave"	Saketh Sairam	Sujatha Mohan
2009	Kasko	"Nachchavey"	Premgi Amaren	Saindhavi
2010	Shopping Mall	"Thana Roopam"	VijayAnthony	-
2010	Awaara	"Yedho"	Yuvan Shankar Raja	
2010	Padmavyuham(D)	"Andinantha Dochayi"	James Vasanthan	KG Ranjith
2010	Padmavyuham(D)	"Virise roja poove needi"	James Vasanthan	Sunitha Sarathy
2011	Pilla Dorikithe Pelli	"Siri Siri Muvva (Gundello)"	Bombay Bhole	Harini
2012	Mask	"Naataina"	Krishna Kumar	
2013	Callcenter	"Tellani Megaalu"	Sai Karthik	
2013	Mallikalustha	Etelli Pothundo Manasu	Usha	
2013	NH4	"Neelakasham"	G.V.Prakash	Pooja
2014	Oka Laila Kosam	"Oka Laila Kosam"	Anup Rubens	Divya
2014	Aaaah (D)	Anthala meda	Sam CS	
2014	Kulfi (D)	Unmadivai	Vivek siva, Yuvan Shankar Raja, Mervin Solomon	
2015	Krishnamma Kalipindi Iddarini	"Madana Mohana"	Hari	Pranavi
2016	M.S. Dhoni: The Untold Story	"Prathi Gaalilo Dhoni yee"	Rochak Kohli	
2018	Inttelligent	"Chamak Chamak"(Remix)	S. Thaman	Harini Ivaturi
2021	Ippudu Kaaka Inkeppudu	"Kannulo Thadi Rusuva"	Sahityyasagar	
2021	Akhanda	"Adigaa Adigaa"	S. Thaman	M L Sruthi
2021	Peddhanna	"Annayya Annayya"	D.Imman	
2022	Induvadana	"Kallalloki Kallu Petti Chudu"	Shiva Kakani	Sahithi
2022	Panchathantram	"Arere Arere"	Prashanth R Vihari	Chinmayi Sripada
2022	Sita Ramam	"Hey Raama"	Vishal Chandrasekhar	Ramya Behara
2022	Sita Ramam	"Inthandham"	Vishal Chandrasekhar	
2022	Sita Ramam	"Inthandham"(Reprise)	Vishal Chandrasekhar	
2022	Darja	"Vellipove Vellipove"	Rap Rock Shakeel	
2022	First Day First Show	"Ode to Cinema"	Radhan	
2023	Amigos	"Ennorathrulu"(Remix)	Ghibran	
2023	IPL (It's Pure Love)	"Naatho Nadiche"	Vengi	
2023	Samajavaragamana	"Choti Choti"	Gopi Sundar	
2023	Annapurna Photo Studio	"Rangamma"	Prince Henry	
2023	Bhagavanth Kesari	"UyyaaloUyyaala"	S. Thaman	
2023	Saindhav	"Bujjikondave"	Santhosh Narayanan	
2023	Shantala	"Cheli Mohame"	Vishal Chandrasekhar	
2024	Jayamundhi Bhayamela Manasaa	"Ye Kastam"	Kalyan Nayak	
2024	Samudrudu	"Kola Kalla Vasari"	Subash Anand	
2024	Aarambham	"Anaga Anaga"	Sinjith Yerramilli	
2024	Purushothamudu	"Pacha Pachani"	Gopi Sundar	
2024	Sandeham	"Manase Marala"	Subash Anand	K. Pranati
2024	The Greatest of All Time (D)	Ninni Kanna Kanulae	Yuvan Shankar Raja	K. S. Chithra
2024	Aa Okkati Adakku	"Mangalyam"	Gopi Sundar	Ramya Behara
2024	Narudi Brathuku Natana	"Kalaa Nuvve"	NYX Lopez	
2024	Bachhala Malli	"Ade Nenu Asalu Lenu"	Vishal Chandrasekhar	Ramya Behara
2024	Vidudala Part 2 (D)	"Manasulo"	Ilaiyaraja	Ananya Bhat
2025	Sahakutumbaanaam	"Sahakutumbaanam"	Mani Sharma	Shrutika Samudhrala
2025	Artiste	"Navvy Naa oopirive"	Suresh Bobbili	
2025	Katha Kamamishu	"Thaddim Dhirana"	RR Dhruva	Sunitha Upadrashta
2025	Shashtipoorthi	"Iru Kanula Kanula"	Illayaraja	Vibavari
2025	Shashtipoorthi	"Ottu Petti Raaja"	Illayaraja	
2025	Meghalu Cheppina Prema Katha	"Oka Merupu"	Justin Prabhakaran	Shashaa Tirupathi
2025	Kishkindhapuri	"Needi Naadi O chiru Lokam"	Chaitan Bharadwaj	
2025	Akhanda 2	"Hara Hara"	Thaman S	Sri Krishna
2025	Mario	"Haayi Haayigaa"	Rakendu Mouli	Vinaita Sivakumar
2026	Itlu Mee Yedhava	" Unnata Mari Lenatta"	RP Patnaik	Shruthika Samudhrala

=== Hindi ===
Year	Film	Song	Composer(s)
2005	Chandramukhi (D)	"Devuda Devuda - Devare Devare"	Vidyasagar
2005	Chandramukhi (D)	"Athindom -Kali ho tum koi mehki re mehki"	Vidyasagar
2005	Chandramukhi (D)	"Annanoda Pattu - Shart Mila Laga Paise"	Vidyasagar
2003	Boys (D)	"Please Sir"	A. R. Rahman
2024	Saindhav (D)	Laado Meri	Santosh Narayanan

=== Kannada ===
Year	Film	Song	Composer(s)	Co-singer(s)
1997	Bhoomi Geetha	"Are Kamali Kamali"	Illayaraja	Sunitha Updrashta
1997	Bhoomi Geetha	"Goroo Gorookanna"	Illayaraja	
1998	Hoomale	"Jhum Jhum Jhenkarava"	Illayaraja	Manjula Gururaj
1998	Hoomale	"O Mahaniyare"	Illayaraja	Manjula Gururaj, Raju Ananthaswamy
1998	Hoomale	"Hennigondu Gandu Beku"	Illayaraja	Manjula Gururaj, Raju Ananthaswamy, Chandrika Gururaj, B. Jayashree, Nagathihalli Chandrashekar
1999	Maha Edabidangi	"Usheya Udayadaa"	Vijaya Bhaskar	SPB, Manjula Gururaj
2024	Kalki 2898 AD	"Keshava Madhava"	Santhosh Narayanan	

=== Malayalam ===
Year	Film	Song	Composer(s)	Co-singer(s)
2023	14 February	Anthikoru Kallu	Vijay Chambath	M Ajithkumar
2024	Kalki 2898 AD (D)	"Keshava Madhava"	Santhosh Narayanan	
2025	Hridayapoorvam	Hridayavathil	Justin Prabhakaran	

=== Independent songs ===
Year	Song	Album	Composer	Language	Notes
2025	Vaanindru - Kural 11	The Thirukkural 1330	LydianNadhaswaram	Tamil	
2025	Gana Gana Ganapathy	Saregama	M Esakkiappan	Telugu	Mukesh Mohammed
2025	Gana Gana Ganapathy	Saregama	M Esakkiappan	Tamil	Mukesh Mohammed
2025	Kalyana Vaibhogamey		Symonpeter Chevuri	Telugu	Sireesha Baghavatula
2025	Manthralaya mahan		Sriraman	Tamil	
2025	Guru Raghavendraaya Namah		Sriraman	Telugu	
2024	The Ayodhya anthem	Homecoming	Darbuka Siva	Telugu	Released on account of Ayodhya Ram Pranaprathistha
2024	Jillellamudi Amma		Tangilra Ravindra kumar	Telugu	
2022	Saadhinchanu	"Desh seva ki kasam"	Vijay Prakash	Telugu	Vijay Prakash, Sunitha, Bombay Jayshri
2022	Thelugintamma Velingintamma	Krishna Tharangalu	Madhavapeddi Suresh	Telugu	Gopika Purnima
2022	Enna Meera		Ravi Visvanathan	Baduga	
2022	Naa Madilo	C NA RE Geetha Raagini	Sai Madhukar	Telugu	C Narayana Reddy lyrics. JAn 2022 release
2021	Sri Guru Datta Saranam	Jai Guru Datta	Santhi Sri	Telugu	S.P Shailaja, Phani Narayana
2021	Etela Rajender		Vidya Sagar Nagavelli	Telugu	
2021	Pramidainaa	RaagaSudha	Surendra Dara	Telugu	
2021	Christian marriage	Peace in Christ	Johnson Victor	Telugu	
2021	Ninadinchu Hrudaya Ravali		Deena Devarajan	Telugu	Tribute to S.P.B
2021	Endhan Nenjelam Unadhu Ninaivugal		Deena Devarajan	Tamil	Tribute to S.P.B
2021	Ammayemo Aakaasam lekka	Oohala Pallaki	Murthy Nookala	Telugu	
2021	Jai Jawan		Subhodhayam Media	Tamil	
2021	Gaanapatyudanu Nenu	Naada Yogamu	Parthu Nemani	Telugu	
2020	Nemali Kantam	Vayyaram	Krishna Teja	Telugu	
2020	సెల్యూట్		S. P. Balasubrahmanyam	Telugu	
2020	Tarala Tarala Tarangini		Sri Madhavapeddi Sureshchandra	Telugu	
2020	KALAGANTI KALAGANTI		JONAH SAMUEL	Telugu	
2018	Naadha Naadha		Maartin Manayani	Malayalam	
2018	Naadha Varoo		Maartin Manayani	Malayalam	
2017	Kula Pichodni	Christmas Koila	YP.Jadson	Telugu	
2014	Entha Bagyavanthulu	Dhanyosmi		Telugu	S P Pallavi
2016	Spirit of Chennai		C.Girinath	Tamil	Produced by Vikram
2013	Ellam Sai		K S Deekshith	Tamil	
2013	Nalo Tolisariga	Nalo Tolisariga	M S Naveen Kumar	Telugu	
2013	Priyathama Ila	Nalo Tolisariga	M S Naveen Kumar	Telugu	
2012	Baarayya Sri Guruve			Kannada	
2012	Settu Putta Datukuntu	Om Om Ayappa	N Surya Prakash	Telugu	
2012	Enni metlu enni metlu	Om Om Ayappa	N Surya Prakash	Telugu	
2010	Nee enge en thaaiye	Planet Galatta	Premgi amaren	Tamil	Murali Krishna, Praveen KL, Gangai Amaren, TantaTubeTV.com
2008	Singapore Thaadi mama	Beauty	Jai	Tamil	Pushpavanam Kuppusamy, Harish Ragavendra
2008	1 4 3 Kadalikku	Lover's Special	Jai	Tamil	Shalini
2005	Anbennum Mandiram	Deiva thaai - Divine Mother	Gangai amaren	Tamil	Gita Cassette
2003	Annai Neeyum	Amma The Mother	Gangai amaren	Tamil	Yugendran, Venkat Prabhu
2002	O Sai Maa Sai	Shirdi Puravasa		Telugu	Aditya Music
2002	Malligai Poovil	Kamban oru Kannile	Devan Ekambaran	Tamil	Sony Music Entertainment, Devan Ekambaram
2002	Unakkagave	Kamban oru Kannile	Devan Ekambaran	Tamil	Sheel
2002	Flight 283	Kamban oru Kannile	Devan Ekambaran	Tamil	Devan ekambaram
2002	Lost on My Way	Kamban oru Kannile	Devan Ekambaran	Tamil	Devan ekambaram
2002	Thirumagal	Kamban oru Kannile	Devan Ekambaran	Tamil	
2001	Sandanala Devaradu	Sri Varamahalakshmi Narasimha		Telugu	

== Awards and nominations ==
Year	Award	Category	Work	Result	Ref.
2008	Vijay Awards	Best Film	Chennai 600028	Nominated	
2011	National Film Awards	Best Debut Film of a Director	Aaranya Kaandam	Won	
2011	Vijay Awards	Best Male Playback Singer	Ayyayo from Aadukalam	Won	
2012	Vijay Awards	Best Film	Aaranya Kaandam	Won	
2013	Tamil Nadu State Film Awards	Best Male Playback Singer	"Enakkaaga Poranthaayae" (from Pannaiyarum Padminiyum)	Won	
2023	South Indian International Movie Awards	Best Male Playback Singer – Telugu	"Oh Sita Hey Rama" (from Sita Ramam)	Nominated	
2023	Filmfare Awards South	Best Male Playback Singer - Telugu	"Inthandham" (from Sita Ramam)	Nominated	
