= Putham Pudhu Kaalai Vidiyaadhaa =

2022 anthology web television series

- Release poster
- Genre: Drama; Anthology
- Written by: Balaji Mohan; Halitha Shameem; Madhumitha; Sabarivasan Shanmugam; S. Guhapriya; Richard Anthony; Praveena Shivram
- Directed by: Balaji Mohan; Halitha Shameem; Madhumitha; Surya Krishna; Richard Anthony
- Starring: Nadhiya; Joju George; Arjun Das; Aishwarya Lekshmi; Lijomol Jose; Sananth; Teejay Arunasalam; Gouri G. Kishan; Dhilip Subbarayan; Arun Kurian; Nirmal Pillai
- Theme music composer: G. V. Prakash Kumar
- Opening theme: "Putham Pudhu Kaalai Vidiyaadhaa – Title Track"
- Composers: Sean Roldan; Goutham Vasu Venkatesan; Karthikeya Murthy; Kaber Vasuki; Pradeep Kumar
- No. of episodes: 5

Production
- Cinematography: Preetha Jayaraman; Vikas Vasudevan
- Editor: T. S. Suresh
- Production companies: Mindscreen Cinemas; Phoenix Inspired; Hammock Productions; Wallwatcher Films; Room 101 Productions

Original release
- Network: Amazon Prime Video
- Release: 14 January 2022

Putham Pudhu Kaalai Vidiyaadhaa (transl. Won't a brand new dawn rise?) is a 2022 Indian Tamil-language anthology series, consisting of five episodes directed by Balaji Mohan, Halitha Shameem, Madhumitha, Surya Krishna and Richard Anthony. The series features an ensemble cast of Aishwarya Lekshmi, Arjun Das, Dhilip Subbarayan, Gouri G. Kishan, Joju George, Lijomol Jose, Nadhiya, Nirmal Pillai, Sananth and Teejay Arunasalam.

A successor to the anthology film Putham Pudhu Kaalai (2020), the series was set and shot during the second wave of the COVID-19 pandemic. The series premiered on Amazon Prime Video on 14 January 2022, coinciding with the Pongal festival.

== Premise ==
The five-episode series is set during the lockdown restrictions, followed by the second wave of COVID-19 pandemic.

== Plot ==
Mugakavasa Mutham - Police constables Murugan and Kuyuli undertake a heartwarming adventure to reunite two lovers. This adventure gives Murugan an opportunity to pursue his own love interest.

Loners - After going through a breakup in the pandemic, Nalla serendipitously meets Dheeran at a virtual wedding. What follows is a series of deep, meaningful conversations that enables them to develop a bond virtually and be alone together.

Mouname Paarvayaai - Yashoda and Murali have not spoken to each other in years despite living in the same house, in the shadow of their unforgotten love. When Yashoda begins to show symptoms of the virus, Murali takes care of her, which brings them together.

The Mask - Arjun, an IT professional working from home, struggles to tell his overbearing parents about his secret relationship. An out-of-the-blue rendezvous with an old friend, Velu, alters the course of both their lives and inspires self-acceptance like never before.

Nizhal Tharum Idham - When 30-year-old Shobi receives the news of her father's death, she travels to Pondicherry, her hometown. There, she discovers what it means to feel alive again through the redemptive power of the acceptance of grief.

== Cast ==
Mugakavasa Mutham	Loners	Mouname Paarvayaai	The Mask	Nizhal Tharum Idham
Teejay Arunasalam as Murugan; Gouri G. Kishan as Kuyili; Saraswathi Menon as Manasa; Sharada Subramanian as Hemalatha; Anbu Thasan as Lokesh; Vignesh as Guru; Kalloori Vinoth as Farook	Lijomol Jose as Nallathangaal; Arjun Das as Dheeran; Abhinaya Melusub as RJ Abhinaya; Bala Vignesh as Nallathangaal's ex-boyfriend	Nadhiya as Yashoda; Joju George as Murali; Rithika as Yashoda's daughter	Sananth as Arjun; Dhilip Subbarayan as Velu; Arun Kurian as Paul; Daya Shankar Pandey as Arjun's father; Tulasi as Prameela; Anand Murali as a waiter	Aishwarya Lekshmi as Shobi; Nirmal Pillai as Eric; Viji Chandrasekhar as Rita; Veera as Muzzammil; Bava Chelladurai as Arokiyadass; Roshni Kalyanakumar as Sarina; Nishanth Naidu as Pawan; Niraimathi as Lourde

== Episodes ==
Title	Director	Writers	Cinematographer	Music	Editor
Mugakavasa Mutham	Balaji Mohan	Balaji Mohan	Om Prakash	Sean Roldan	Prasanna GK
Loners	Halitha Shameem	Halitha Shameem	raghav adithya	Goutham Vasu Venkatesan	Halitha Shameem
Mouname Paarvayaai	Madhumitha	Madhumitha, Sabarivasan Shanmugam	Preetha Jayaraman	Karthikeya Murthy	T. S. Suresh
The Mask	Surya Krishna	S. Guhapriya	Yamini Yagnamurthy	Kaber Vasuki	Ruben
Nizhal Tharum Idham	Richard Anthony	Richard Anthony, Praveena Shivram	Vikas Vasudevan	Pradeep Kumar	Sangathamizhan E.

== Production ==
A successor to the Tamil-language anthology drama Putham Pudhu Kaalai (2020) was announced on 30 December 2021, by Amazon Prime Video, which exclusively produced and distributed the film to the streaming platform. It was titled as Putham Pudhu Kaalai Vidiyaathaa, whose teaser was released on the same day. The anthology consists of five short films directed by Balaji Mohan, Halitha Shameem, Madhumitha, Surya Krishna and Richard Anthony. Unlike its predecessor, which was made in a feature film format, the anthology was made as a five-episode web television series. Aparna Purohit, creative head of Amazon Prime Video in India, had stated, "This anthology tells deeper, personal stories. Both the anthologies prove that art can thrive in the toughest of periods".

== Music ==
Putham Pudhu Kaalai Vidiyaadhaa

Soundtrack album by G. V. Prakash Kumar, Sean Roldan, Goutham Vasu Venkatesan, Karthikeya Murthy, Kaber Vasuki, Pradeep Kumar
- Released: 10 January 2022
- Recorded: 2021–2022
- Genre: Amazon Original Series Soundtrack
- Length: 19:07
- Language: Tamil
- Label: Amazon Music

The music and original score for the short films is composed by Sean Roldan, Goutham Vasu Venkatesan, Karthikeya Murthy, Kaber Vasuki and Pradeep Kumar. G. V. Prakash Kumar who worked on its predecessor, scored music for the title track of the film. It was released on 10 January 2022, with a promotional music video being uploaded to YouTube. The soundtrack album consisting of six tracks were released on the same day. It featured lyrics written by Kaber Vasuki, Halitha Shameem, Balaji Mohan and Sabarivasan Shanmugam.

The New Indian Express stated that "the album brings out the essence of the anthology of five heartwarming and buoyant stories". A cover version of the title track was performed by the students of IIT Madras, during the annual cultural festival Saarang. Their rendition was individually released on 12 January.

Track listing
No.	Title	Lyrics	Music	Singer(s)	Length
1.	"Putham Pudhu Kaalai Vidiyaadhaa – Title Track"	Kaber Vasuki	G. V. Prakash Kumar	G. V. Prakash Kumar, Yamini Ghantasala	3:10
2.	"Mugamoodi"	Kaber Vasuki	Kaber Vasuki	Kaber Vasuki	4:30
3.	"Kitta Varudhu"	Balaji Mohan	Sean Roldan	Sean Roldan	2:28
4.	"Whistler"	Sabarivasan Shanmugam	Karthikeya Murthy	Karthikeya Murthy	2:30
5.	"Nizhal Tharum Idham"	Kaber Vasuki	Pradeep Kumar	Pradeep Kumar	3:35
6.	"Thanimai Ennum"	Halitha Shameem	Goutham Vasu Venkatesan	Goutham Vasu Venkatesan, Amritha Susanthika	2:52
Total length:					19:07

== Release ==
Putham Pudhu Kaalai Vidiyaadhaa premiered through the streaming platform Amazon Prime Video, on the occasion of Pongal festival (14 January) 2022.
