= Namma Ooru Hero =

- Genre: Reality talk show
- Directed by: Arjun Karthikeyan
- Presented by: Vijay Sethupathi
- Music by: Karthikeya Murthy
- Country of origin: India
- Original language: Tamil
- No. of episodes: 16

Production
- Executive producer: Sanjay Subashchandran
- Camera setup: Multi-camera
- Running time: 50–55 minutes
- Production companies: Noise & Grains, Maximize Media, Sun Entertainment

Original release
- Network: Sun TV
- Release: 20 January – 12 May 2019

Namma Ooru Hero is a 2019 Tamil reality talk show which is currently telecasted on Sun TV airing every Sunday which started from 20 January 2019 and 12 May 2019. The TV programme is presented by popular actor Vijay Sethupathi who eventually made his full-fledged television debut as a host.

The title of the show itself reveals about the many unknown or lesser known unsung heroes in the society who selflessly toil for the betterment of the society and content of the show is reported to have not included any other famous celebrities including actors and politicians except the presenter of the show.

The announcement about the launch of the programme was revealed by Sun TV during November 2018 and it eventually replaced Sun Naam Oruvar which was hosted by actor Vishal.

== List of episodes ==
Episode	Air Date	Guests
1	20 January	Teachers Annapurna Mohan (Empowered Poor Children Through her phonetic Teaching Methods) and Theruvilakku Gobinath (Uses Classical Arts Like Therukoothu)
2	27 January	Transgender Achievers Tasleema (Social Activist) and Ponni (Bharatanatyam Exponent)
3	3 February	Ambulance Mani (Saves Lives Through His Free Ambulance Service), Mohammed Gadaffi (Maa Ula: The Chennai Bike Taxi Service run By Differently Abled Persons)
4	10 February	Daisy Victor (87-Year-Old Athlete), Mariyappan (Football Coach and Social Worker)
5	17 February	Pachayamma (Former Slave labour Rescuing People from Slave labour), Parthiban (Retired Bank Manager Helps Poor People Get Loans)
6	24 February	Pon Thangavelu (Runs an Organization Uncovering Graft and Corruption), "Tholgal Manika Bharathi" (Runs an organization providing Employment Training at juvenile detention centers)
7	3 March	Young Trend Setters Hanifa Zaara(Young Swachh Bharat Ambassador), Nandhini (Social Activist for Child marriage)
8	10 March	Samuel Velankanni (Integrator of safai karmachari andolan), Ezhumalai (Cloth Merchant, Creates awareness about Tree Planting)
9	17 March	Kuliyal Govindasamy (Creates awareness about water usage), "Wake our Lake" Saravanan (Recovered dead lakes back)
10	24 March	'WhatsApp' Veeraraghavan (Creates Job Opportunities Through WhatsApp Messenger), Sandhiyan (Run a NGO called "Aware India" Raising Awareness on Respecting Women and fighting against Gender Based Violence)
11	31 March	'Sigaram' Kandhasamy (Oranganises free tours for the elderly aiming to make them happy), 'Chicago' Sukumaran (The joint secretary of the Tea Stall Owners Union and Helps Labourers working in tea Shops)
12	7 April	'Pallanguzhi' Iniyan (Spreads Awareness on Traditional Games), Uma Muthuram (Runs Siragu Montessori School providing free education to children from the begging community and Suyam Charitable Trust for their welfare.)
13	21 April	T. Anand (Teacher at Govt High School, Kalachery North Spreads awareness on Preventing suicide in the village), Dr.Gopi Nallaiyan (Cardiothoracic surgeon conducts free heart Surgeries)
14	28 April	'Ocean Awareness' Vinod (Spreads Awareness about Ocean Cleanliness and Indulges in Removing garbage from the ocean), 'Makkal Nesan' Ashok Priyadarshan (Adopted a Village Called Vanjivakkam doing Social Service)
15	5 May	Review of Earlier Guests.
16	12 May	Review of Earlier Guests.
