= Badava Gopi =

Indian actor and stand-up comedian

- Born: Gopinath; 2 September 1967 (age 59); Chennai, Tamil Nadu, India
- Occupations: Stand-up comedian, mimicry artist, actor, radio jockey
- Years active: 1999–present
- Spouse: Haritha

Badava Gopi is an Indian stand-up comedian and actor, known for his work in Tamil cinema.

== Career ==
Badava Gopi is an Indian stand-up comedian, actor, singer, hailing from Chennai, Tamil Nadu. He was introduced into films in 2005 in the movie Poi, shot in Sri Lanka by the veteran director Thiru K. Balachander (who is the guru to Kamal Haasan, Rajinikanth and many others in the film industry), he has performed his comedy shows globally and the show performed exclusively for Abdul Kalam has earned him many accolades. He was a radio jockey and host, with Hello FM and Radio city. Gopi has worked as an actor, often portraying supporting comedic characters. He has often been cast in films directed by Venkat Prabhu, while he has also portrayed major roles in Samuthirakani's Poraali & Nimirndhu Nil. Gopi portrayed a television journalist in Thodari (2016), and to prepare for his role, he observed several television hosts and incorporated their body language into his performance.

Gopi has also worked as a cricket commentator, initially working on Celebrity Cricket League matches, before working for professional players in the Tamil Nadu Premier League. Gopi acted as a cricket commentator in the film Chennai 28, again he acted in its sequel.

== Filmography ==
=== Films ===
Year	Film	Role	Notes
2006	Poi	Banerjee	
2007	Chennai 600028	Commentator	
2008	Saroja	Himself	
2009	Vaalmiki	Mental patient	
2011	Payanam	Gopinath	
2012	Poraali	Groundfloor Tenant	
2012	3	Tuition Master	
2013	Onbadhule Guru	Kamal	
2013	Naveena Saraswathi Sabatham	Rajendran	
2013	Biriyani	Gopi	
2013	Pattathu Yaanai	Teacher	
2014	Aaha Kalyanam	Hyder	
2014	Pulivaal	iPhone service person	
2014	Nimirndhu Nil	Design Seenu	
2014	Aindhaam Thalaimurai Sidha Vaidhiya Sigamani	Sigamani's friend	
2015	Janda Pai Kapiraju	RTO Officer	Telugu film
2015	Massu Engira Masilamani	Registrar	
2015	Moone Moonu Varthai	Karna's boss	
2015	Moodu Mukkallo Cheppalante	Karna's boss	Telugu film
2016	Thodari	Journalist	
2016	Kodi	Reporter	
2016	Chennai 600028 II: Second Innings	Commentator	
2017	Enakku Vaaitha Adimaigal	TV Show Anchor	
2017	Thondan	Reporter	
2018	Koothan	Asian Dance Competition Host	
2019	K.D.	Gurukal	
2019	Panam Kaaikkum Maram		
2020	Naan Sirithal	Gopi	
2021	Friendship	Professor	
2021	Maanaadu	politician	
2021	Operation JuJuPi	Gopi	
2022	Nitham Oru Vaanam	Arjun’s Boss	
2023	Iraivan	Journalist and TV Anchor	
2024	Dear	Advocate Adaikalasamy	
2024	Vasco Da Gama	Rajangam	
2024	Emakku Thozhil Romance	Umashankar's uncle	
2024	Miss You	Association secretary	Uncredited
2025	Yolo		
2026	L.S.S: Love Subscribe Share		
2026	Carmeni Selvam	Passenger	
2026	Singgaramm		
2026	John Doe	Chandru's father	

=== As singer ===
Year	Film	Song	Notes
2016	Rajini Murugan	"Aaviparakkum Teakadai"	

=== Television ===
Year	Title	Role	Network	Notes
1999	Galata Sirippu	Pichai		Galatta Kudumbam, season 2, by AVM
2001	Pitchathibathi		Jaya TV	Satire; spoof of Kaun Banega Crorepati
2004	Poi Alla Pottu Kudu		Raj TV	Satire; spoof of Kadhai Alla Nijam
2006	EQ	Judge	Vijay TV	College cultural competition
2007	King Queen Jack		Vijay TV	first standup comedy show in Tamil
2008	Jodi No 1	Contestant	Vijay TV	season 3
2013	60 Nodi Are You Ready ?	Contestant	Vijay TV	
2019	Adhu Enga Raja Kaalam	Computer science teacher	Eruma Saani	
2021	Mr. and Mrs. Chinnathirai	Contestant	Vijay TV	season 3
2021	Jungle Resort	Manager	Eruma Saani	
2022	Ill Thakka Saiya	Vikram’s father	Eruma Saani	
2022	Meme Boys	Professor Kadir	SonyLIV	
2023	Accidental Farmer and Co	Postman	SonyLIV	
2026	Resort	Uthaman	JioHotstar	
