= K.D. (film) =

2019 Tamil film

- Poster
- Directed by: Madhumitha
- Written by: Madhumitha
- Screenplay by: Sabarivaasan Shanmugam
- Story by: Madhumitha
- Produced by: Vikram Mehra; Siddharth Anand Kumar
- Starring: Mu Ramaswamy; Naga Vishal
- Cinematography: Meyyendiran Kempuraj
- Edited by: Vijay Venkataramanan
- Music by: Karthikeya Murthy
- Production company: Yoodlee films
- Distributed by: YNOTX
- Release date: 22 November 2019
- Running time: 123 minutes
- Country: India
- Language: Tamil

K.D. (also known as KD Engira Karuppudurai or simply Karuppudurai), is a 2019 Indian Tamil-language comedy drama film written and directed by Madhumita and produced by Yoodlee Films, a production venture of Saregama India Limited. The film stars Mu Ramaswamy and Naga Vishal. The music was composed by Karthikeya Murthy.

Nagavishal won Best Child Actor National Award in 2021 and Best Actor Award at the Jagran Film Festival 2019. Madhumita was awarded the Best Director at the UK Asian Film Festival 2019. K.D. released worldwide on 22 November 2019.

It was remade in Hindi as Kaalidhar Laapata (2025) by Madhumita herself, starring Abhishek Bachchan portraying Mu Ramaswamy's character.

== Plot ==
Karuppu Durai, an 80-year-old man, bedridden for the past three months in a coma, suddenly wakes up one fine day to overhear his family planning to kill him by performing an ancient euthanasia or thalaikoothal ritual. Hurt, heartbroken, and afraid, Karuppu Durai runs away from the only home he has ever known. On an aimless path with nowhere to go, he accidentally meets an 8-year-old orphan named Kutty. Kutty is everything that Karuppu Durai is not: smart, spunky and full of life. The fiercely independent Kutty encourages KD to chalk out a bucket list and start living for himself. Thus begins an eventful road trip of this unlikely pair – an old man running away from his family and a young boy who never had one. The duo set out to complete KD's bucket list during which a strong bond forms between the two. Eventually, Kutty gets an offer to get admitted in a school in Chennai, and KD, although initially hesitant to let him go, decides that Kutty should go to Chennai to lead a good life. KD then returns to his home, and signs the document handing over the property to his sons. The morning before KD's family decides to kill him by performing euthanasia, KD leaves his family once again for good.

== Cast ==
- Mu Ramaswamy as Karuppudurai alias KD
- Naga Vishal as Kutty
- Yog Japee as Easan
- Badava Gopi as Gurukal
- Ganesan Kaliamoorthy as Muthu
- Guna Babu as Raja
- Pari as Ganesan
- Jawarhlal as Thyagu
- Gabriella Sellus as Selvi
- Jyothi as Pichai
- Gnasekaran as Palani
- Arunika as Lakshmi
- Bhagyalakahmi as Chitra
- Bharath Nellaiyappan as Muni
- Krishna as Velu
- Mahesh as Dharmakartha
- Ramar as Kodangi
- Vijaylakshmi as Valli

== Awards and nominations ==
| Award | Category | Recipient | Result | Ref |
|---|---|---|---|---|
| Ananda Vikatan Awards | Best Director (Special Mention) | Madhumitha | Won | |
| Ananda Vikatan Awards | Best Dialogues | Sabarivaasan Shanmugam | Won | |
| Ananda Vikatan Awards | Best Child actor | Naga Vishal | Won | |
| Ananda Vikatan Awards | Best Production | Saregama | Won | |
| Critics Choice Film Awards | Best Writing | Madhumitha, Sabarivaasan Shanmugam | Nominated | |
| Jagran Film Festival | Best Actor Award | Naga Vishal | Won | |
| UK Asian Film Festival | Best Director Award | Madhumita | Won | |
| Singapore South Asian Film Festival | Jury Award | Yoodlee films | Won | |
| Indian Film Festival of Cincinnati | Best Director Award | Madhumita | Won | |
| Caleidoscope Indian Film Festival of Boston | Unorthodox Roleplay Award for Acting | Mu Ramaswamy, Naga Vishal | Won | |
| New York Indian Film Festival | Best Actor | Mu Ramaswamy | Nominated | |
| New York Indian Film Festival | Best Child Actor | Naga Vishal | Nominated | |
| Asian American International Film Festival | Best Actor | Mu Ramaswamy | Nominated | |
| Asian American International Film Festival | Best Child Actor | Naga Vishal | Won | |
| Ottawa Indian Film Festival Awards | Closing film | - | | |
| Tasveer South Asian Film Festival | Best Film | Yoodlee films | Nominated | |
| 67th National Film Awards | Best Child Artist | Naga Vishal | Won | |

== Soundtrack ==
K.D. (a) Karuppu Durai

Soundtrack album by Karthikeya Murthy
- Released: 8 November 2019
- Genre: Feature film soundtrack
- Language: Tamil
- Label: Saregama
- Producer: Yoodlee films

Karthikeya Murthy chronology
| Moone Moonu Varthai (2015) | K.D. (a) Karuppu Durai (2019) |

Karthikeya Murthy wrote and composed music for this film, consisting of 3 songs apart from the OST. The album & OST received positive reviews from critics with Times of India reviewing the music as "jaunty and moving in the right places, do the magic" and Firstpost said "With a bubbly score that feels like childlike mischief made tangible" amongst others.

| No. | Title | Lyrics | Singer(s) | Length |
|---|---|---|---|---|
| 1. | "Tuckulingu" | Sabarivaasan Shanmugam | Benny Dayal, Andrea, Karthikeya Murthy |
| 2. | "Adi Adi Aathi" | Sabarivaasan Shanmugam | Karthikeya Murthy, Diwakar |
| 3. | "Kaatrodu" | Karthikeya Murthy | Balram |

== Critical response ==
KD (a) Karuppu Durai opened to strong critical acclaim with Times of India, The New Indian Express, The Indian Express and several other critics giving 4/5, while popular Tamil weekly Ananda Vikatan gave a very positive review and 48 marks for the movie. Baradwaj Rangan of Film Companion South wrote "One part of why KD is so entertaining is the chemistry between the old man and the young boy — the other part is that their characters have been sketched out so well. Mu Ramaswamy plays Karuppudurai movingly, but with a twinkle in the eye".

Jigar Ganatra of Mumbai Live gave the film 4.5 stars and wrote "Madhumita's vision to share a message thereby connecting emotionally with the audience comes across thoroughly in this project. KD aka Karuppudurai is more like embarking on a journey only two observe the lives of two beautiful souls who have no other intention but to keep each other happy and entertained. This film, as expected, fills your heart with various emotions."
