= Alaipayuthey =

2000 Indian film by Mani Ratnam

- Poster
- Directed by: Mani Ratnam
- Screenplay by: Mani Ratnam
- Story by: Mani Ratnam; R. Selvaraj
- Produced by: Mani Ratnam; G. Srinivasan; K Karunamoorthi; Rohan Manickavasagar
- Starring: R. Madhavan; Shalini
- Cinematography: P. C. Sreeram
- Edited by: A. Sreekar Prasad
- Music by: A. R. Rahman
- Production company: Madras Talkies
- Distributed by: Ayngaran International
- Release date: 14 April 2000
- Running time: 138 minutes
- Country: India
- Language: Tamil

Alaipayuthey, also spelled as Alai Payuthey (/əlaɪpɑːjʊðeɪ/ transl. Waves are flowing), is a 2000 Indian Tamil-language romantic musical film co-written, co-produced, and directed by Mani Ratnam, starring R. Madhavan and Shalini (in her penultimate film role). The film explores the tensions of married life between two young people who elope and the maturing of love among urban Indians who are conflicted between tradition and modernity. The score and soundtrack were composed by A. R. Rahman.

The film's story is mostly recollected in flashbacks by Karthik (Madhavan), on how he and Shakthi (Shalini) fall in love against the backdrop of Chennai and its suburban trains, against the wishes of their parents. The film had a mostly positive reception by critics.

The film made its European premiere at the Berlin International Film Festival in 2001. It was shown at various film festivals nationally and internationally. It was dubbed and released in Telugu under the title Sakhi. Alaipayuthey was later remade and released in Hindi in 2002, as Saathiya, directed by Shaad Ali.

== Plot ==
Karthik Varadarajan is an independent software engineering graduate from an affluent family who runs a tech startup with his friends. At a wedding, he meets Shakthi Selvaraj, an idealistic medical student from a traditional middle-class background. After a series of chance encounters on their daily commuter trains, Karthik aggressively pursues Shakthi and proposes marriage. Shakthi is initially reluctant, citing their disparate socio-economic backgrounds, but eventually reciprocates his feelings. Karthik convinces his parents to formally approach Shakthi's family for her hand. However, the parents clash bitterly during the meeting over class differences, prompting a devastated Shakthi to call off the relationship and leave for a medical camp in Kerala.

While separated, Karthik and Shakthi realize the depth of their bond. They reunite and secretly marry via a civil registration without their families' knowledge or consent. To prevent familial distress, they continue living separately with their respective parents, keeping the marriage a secret while waiting for an opportune time to disclose it. Tensions erupt when an affluent family arrives at Shakthi's house to negotiate an alliance for her elder sister, Poorni. The visiting family unexpectedly proposes a double wedding, intending to marry their younger son to Shakthi as well. Left with no choice, Shakthi confesses her existing marriage to Karthik. Concurrently, Karthik confesses the truth to his family. Outraged by the perceived deception, both sets of parents disown and evict the newlyweds from their respective homes.

Karthik and Shakthi move into a modest, half-constructed apartment to begin their lives together. While initially blissful, they soon find that domestic life introduces unforeseen financial and emotional friction, leading to frequent ego-driven arguments. The strain deepens when Shakthi learns that her estranged father has been hospitalized with severe illness. When she asks Karthik to accompany her to the hospital, he hesitates, citing her father's intense resentment toward him. Though he relents the following day, her father dies before they arrive. Wracked with guilt and grief, Shakthi emotionally distances herself, and the couple enters a period of bitter, silent alienation.

Anxious to repair the damage to Shakthi's family, Karthik secretly intervenes to salvage Poorni’s broken marriage alliance. He facilitates private meetings between Poorni and her original suitor, successfully helping them reconcile and secure their engagement. Karthik keeps this intervention a secret, intending to surprise Shakthi once the wedding is officially finalized. However, Shakthi spots Poorni hugging Karthik at a railway station in a moment of pure gratitude. Misinterpreting the embrace as an extramarital affair, Shakthi returns home deeply embittered.

Shakthi eventually visits Poorni, who discloses Karthik's selfless efforts on her behalf. Overcome with remorse for doubting her husband, Shakthi rushes home to reconcile. Simultaneously, Karthik's startup secures a lucrative contract. Eager to celebrate the milestone and reconcile with his wife, Karthik heads to the railway station to meet her for their usual evening routine. Meanwhile, in her frantic rush to return home, Shakthi is struck by a speeding vehicle. When Shakthi fails to arrive, a panicked Karthik launches a desperate search across the city's medical facilities, ultimately locating her in a critical care unit, where she lies in a coma following emergency neurosurgery.

An Indian Administrative Service (IAS) officer named Ram steps forward, claiming responsibility for the accident and explaining that he admitted her to the hospital under a temporary alias to expedite her treatment. As a frustrated Karthik vents his anger, Ram’s wife intercedes, confessing that she was the one driving the vehicle and that Ram was merely taking the blame to shield her from prosecution. Witnessing Ram's profound protective devotion to his wife, a chastened Karthik reflects on his own shortcomings as a spouse. Sitting by Shakthi's bedside, he confesses his regrets and vows to be a better partner. Shakthi subsequently regains consciousness, and the couple tearfully reconciles.

== Cast ==
- R. Madhavan as Karthik Varatharajan
- Shalini as Dr. Sakthi
- Jayasudha as Saroja
- Swarnamalya as Poorani
- Vivek as Sedhu
- Pyramid Natarajan as Varatharajan
- Raviprakash as Selvaraj
- Sriranjani as Karthik's sister-in-law
- Venu Arvind as Aarumugam
- K. P. A. C. Lalitha as Karthik's mother
- Sukumari as Sakthi's aunt
- Azhagam Perumal as Nayar
- Hari Nair as Raguraman
- Karthik Kumar as Shyam
- Medha Ragunath as Karthik's colleague
- R. Sundaramoorthy as Nadar
- Kumar Natarajan as Ganesh
- Prema as Prema
- Chitra as Chitra
- Raj Naveen as Raj
- Arvind Swamy as Ram I.A.S (cameo)
- Khushbu as Meena Ram (cameo)
- Sophiya Haque (special appearance in the song "September Madham")
- Rangammal (special appearance in the song "Yaro Yaarodi")

== Production ==
=== Development ===
Mani Ratnam opted to make a romantic film with relative newcomers after his 1998 Hindi film Dil Se.. and signed on small screen actor R. Madhavan to make his acting debut in Tamil films. Madhavan had done a sandalwood talc ad for Santosh Sivan in 1996 and the veteran cinematographer gave photographs of the actor to Mani Ratnam during the casting process of Iruvar. The director had made Madhavan audition for a role in the film but turned him down citing that "he thought his eyes were too young" and assured "that they would work together some other time". In 1999, Mani Ratnam rang Madhavan up suddenly and told him to "Come down and we will do a photo session. I am starting a film with you", much to the actor's surprise.

P. C. Sreeram renewed his collaboration with Mani Ratnam after seven years, with the director toggling between Santosh Sivan and Rajiv Menon for his other projects. A. R. Rahman was initially signed on just to compose the background score for the film as the film was originally planned to be songless; however after a change of heart, nine songs were recorded.

=== Casting ===
Mani Ratnam initially wanted to cast a debutant in the lead female role as well and carried out a screen test with Vasundhara Das, before signing on Shalini to play the role in the film in April 1999. Swarnamalya was selected to play the role of Poorni after the director spotted her on a television show and subsequently asked her to screen test for the film. The actress appeared without make-up in the film and also dubbed her own lines. Theatre actor Karthik Kumar also marked his film debut with a minor supporting role as a potential suitor to Shakti. Karthik initially screen tested for the lead role but was rejected due to being too young. Prior to the release of his breakthrough film Sethu (1999), Vikram was approached by Mani Ratnam to play the role of Swarnamalya's fiancé but turned down the offer.

Television actress Sriranjani made her film debut with this film appearing as Madhavan's sister-in-law while Raviprakash appeared as Shalini's father thus making his acting debut with the film. Pondy Ravi appeared as a police officer, and the film is considered his "first break". Mani chose producer Pyramid Natarajan to portray the character of Madhavan's father. Azhagam Perumal who was one of the assistant directors in the film was chosen to portray the small role of a house owner as Mani Ratnam was looking for "someone like Jagathy Sreekumar to play the quirky house owner". The film also required two leading actors to appear in supporting roles with Khushbu chosen to do a role. After reports that either Shah Rukh Khan, Mammootty, or Mohanlal were considered, Mani Ratnam signed Arvind Swamy to play another role, with Alai Payuthey becoming the pair's fourth production together.

=== Filming ===
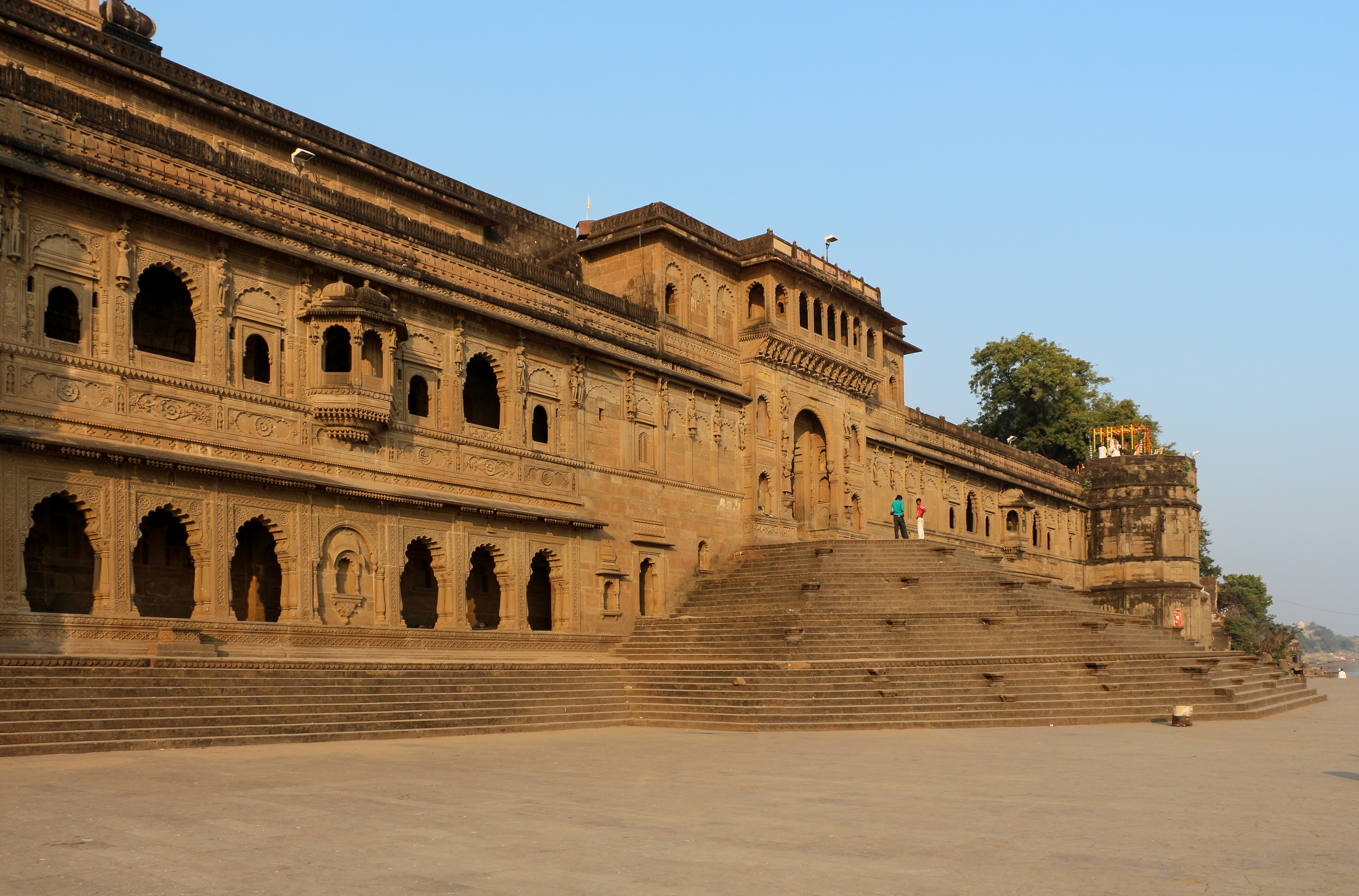
The song "Snegithane" was shot at Fort Ahilya of the Holkar dynasty, in Maheshwar.

The film began without an official launch, like other Mani Ratnam projects, and it was initially expected that filming would be wrapped up in under four months. During the first seven days of the shoot, Mani Ratnam filmed portions featuring Shalini and made Madhavan stay on the sets and watch his process of film-making. The first scene the actor shot was the post-interval scene featuring Shakthi's mother played by Jayasudha. The song sequences Evano Oruvan, and September Matham was shot at Western India Plywood Guest house and the Dharmadam Island respectively. "Evano Oruvan" was shot at Kannur as the song sequence demanded rain and the crew had to wait for many days for monsoon to shoot. The team shot at Srinagar in late for 25 days, becoming the last production team to shoot in the area until 2003 as a result of the Kashmir conflict.

The song "Pachai Nirame" was shot at Kashmir. For the song, Sreeram revealed since the song "called for vibrant colours in pastel shades", he used a graduated filter to enhance colour and used lot of filters. A "meet the stars" publicity event was held at Music World in Spencer Plaza in March 2000, with the gathering being described as a success. About the production process, Madhavan revealed that he learnt about the technical aspects of film-making from the director and mentioned that he even learned the entire script of the film, irrespective of whether he was in the scene or not, claiming that working with Mani Ratnam inspires that sort of involvement and dedication.

== Soundtrack ==
The music score that accompanies the film was composed by A. R. Rahman. Upon release, the album met with widespread critical acclaim, selling over six lakh cassettes, and went on to win the Filmfare Award for Best Music Director in 2000. This was Rahman's 50th film as composer. The soundtrack features 10 songs composed by Rahman, with lyrics by Vairamuthu, except for the title song "Alai Payuthey" (which was created by the 18th-century Carnatic music composer Oothukkadu Venkata Kavi, who also set it to the raagam Kanada). The song "Yaro Yarodi" later appeared in the 2008 American film, The Accidental Husband. The audio rights were sold to Saregama, a prominent music label in the 1999s.

Karthik worked as chorus singer for the film while Clinton Cerejo made his debut as playback singer. Song "Kadhal Sadugudu" provided major breakthrough for its singer S. P. Charan.

== Release and reception ==
Alaipayuthey was released on 14 April 2000, during Puthandu (Tamil New Year). The Hindu said, "The wavy movements are not restricted to the title card alone. Alaipayuthey goes backward and forward in time and the movement holds a thin thread of suspense too. The oscillation from joy and levity to seriousness and sorrow creates impressive waves", The lead pair performance was praised saying, "Shalini once again proves that she is a natural performer while Madhavan sails through the litmus test with ease". Shobha Warrier of Rediff.com gave the film a middling review citing that the film is "old wine in an old bottle" and that "the only person who scores good marks in the film is P. C. Sreeram", saying "he has used his camera as a paintbrush and the strokes are so stunningly beautiful that, once the film is over, one remembers only the visual treat". In regard to performances, the critic mentions that Madhavan "looks pleasant and handsome and does his job splendidly until the end, where he looks totally lost in the most crucial scene" and that Shalini "is very beautiful but not as open as she used to be as a child star".

Tamil Star wrote "A technically near-perfect film but lacking in intensity". Krishna Chidambaram of Kalki praised the performances of Shalini and Madhavan while also appreciating the cameos of Aravind Swamy and Kushboo and also for showing post-marriage friction beautifully. Sify praised the music, direction, acting and cinematography but felt Lalitha and Sukumari were underutilised and also noted that "concentrating more on technical perfection has affected the emotional content of the film".

== Accolades ==
Award	Category	Nominee	Result	Ref.
Filmfare Awards South	Music Director – Tamil	A. R. Rahman	Won	
Filmfare Awards South	Best Male Debut – South	R. Madhavan	Won	
Filmfare Awards South	Best Cinematographer – South	P. C. Sreeram	Won	
Filmfare Awards South	Best Actress – Tamil	Shalini	Nominated	
Tamil Nadu State Film Awards	Special Prize	Shalini	Won	
Tamil Nadu State Film Awards	Best Female Playback Singer	Swarnalatha – "Evano Oruvan.."	Won	

== Other versions ==
Alaipayuthey was dubbed and released in Telugu under the title Sakhi. It was later remade in Hindi as Saathiya by Shaad Ali in 2002. This was the first time where the director had sold off production rights' of his films to be remade in another language as he had previously opted to dub and release the film himself.

== Legacy ==
Alaipayuthey began a successful film career for Madhavan and launched him as a romantic hero. He has since gone on to become a regular part of the cast in Mani Ratnam's productions and featured in leading roles in Dumm Dumm Dumm (2001), Kannathil Muthamittal (2002), Aayutha Ezhuthu (2004) and Guru (2007). Meanwhile, Shalini had already agreed to call time on her career before release due to her pending marriage with Ajith Kumar and Alaipayuthey became her penultimate release. Swarnamalya also received several film offers after her critically acclaimed performance, but consecutive failures of eight of her ten movies since failed to catapult her into the leading bracket of actors. Post-release, the actress had also expressed her disappointment at several of her scenes being edited out of the film. In July 2011, Janani Iyer said she considered a role like Shalini's character from the film as "really challenging". Gautham Vasudev Menon revealed that the scene prior to the song "Evano Oruvan" was "almost straight out of real life" and that he "tried to incorporate such moments" in his films. The film created an interest for weddings held in temples. The song "Yaaro Yaarodi" was used in the American film The Accidental Husband.

== In popular culture ==
Several other directors have made cultural references to Alaipayuthey, with both scenes and songs being alluded in their films. The scene where Madhavan proposes Shalini in the train was spoofed in Boss Engira Bhaskaran (2010) where Bhaskaran (Arya) tries to do the same with Chandrika (Nayanthara) but fails. When Madhavan saw that film, he said "It was a pleasant shock to see this clip feature in [Boss Engira Bhaskaran]. It was such a sweet tribute to me. After watching this sequence, I was quite amused to see how thin I was back then!" In Budget Padmanabhan (2000), Vivek speaks to Bhuvaneswari through cups attached with wires. Vivek utters Madhavan's dialogue from the film by mimicking his voice, he then hurts Theni Kunjarammal's eye by singing the film's song. In Majunu (2001), Vivek impresses lady by singing "Yaro Yarodi" in a telephone booth with his friends while she was speaking on the telephone but lady reveals that her husband was a police inspector, then he sings 'En Garuvam Azhindhadhadi' from the line of a song "Snegithane". In Shahjahan (2001), Vivek and Kovai Sarala's characters sing "Snegithane" in a humorous vein. In the Telugu film Athanu (2001) when AVS's character turns to look at Sana's character, "Snehithudaa" plays in the background.

The Hindi television series Beintehaa was dubbed in Tamil as Alaipayuthe. Songs from the film inspired several film titles – Snegithiye (2000), Kadhal Sadugudu (2003), Evano Oruvan (2007), Pachai Nirame (2008), Ragasiya Snehithane (2008) and Endrendrum Punnagai (2013). The initial publicity posters of Vinnaithaandi Varuvaayaa (2010) were inspired from various films including Alai Payuthey. Karthik Subbaraj also gave the music of Alaipayuthey as a musical reference for the 2025 Tamil film Retro (2025).

== Bibliography ==
- Prasad, Vrinda (March 2011). "Poster Mania". South Scope.
