= Carmeni Selvam =

2026 Tamil film by Ram Chakri

- Theatrical release poster
- Directed by: Ram Chakri
- Written by: Ram Chakri
- Produced by: Arun Rangarajulu
- Starring: P. Samuthirakani; Gautham Vasudev Menon; Lakshmi Priyaa Chandramouli; Abhinaya
- Cinematography: Yuvaraj Dakshan
- Edited by: Jagan RV; Dinesh S
- Music by: Musicloud Studio and Technology
- Production company: Pathway Productions
- Release date: 3 April 2026
- Running time: 144 minutes
- Country: India
- Language: Tamil

Carmeni Selvam (/kɑːrmeɪni/) is a 2026 Indian Tamil-language drama film written and directed by Ram Chakri. The film stars P. Samuthirakani, Gautham Vasudev Menon, Lakshmi Priyaa Chandramouli, and Abhinaya. The music is composed by Musicloud Studio and Technologies, with cinematography by Yuvaraj Dakshan and editing by Jagan RV and Dinesh S. The film was released in theatres on 3 April 2026.

== Plot ==
Selvam is a simple and honest man who lives a modest but content life with his wife Shanthi and their young son. Selvam works as a chauffeur for a wealthy businessman, Sampath, whose affluent lifestyle stands in contrast to Selvam’s humble existence.

Selvam's peaceful life is disrupted by social and financial pressures. At a family function, Shanthi feels humiliated by their inability to match societal expectations and, in an attempt to preserve dignity, sells her mangalsutra to purchase an expensive gift. This incident becomes a turning point, triggering a growing obsession with wealth and social status within the family.

When Sampath leaves for a month-long trip, Selvam begins using his employer’s car as a taxi to earn additional income. Encouraged by people around him and influenced by the culture of easy credit, he gradually becomes entangled in risky financial decisions, including purchasing land through multiple loans and relying heavily on credit cards. What begins as a pursuit of stability turns into a cycle of debt and mounting pressure.

As Selvam struggles to cope with his financial burdens, his personal life and relationships begin to deteriorate. In parallel, Sampath—despite his wealth—faces his own emotional void, unable to spend time with or support his ailing wife, highlighting that financial success does not guarantee personal fulfilment.

The narrative contrasts these two lives to explore the broader reality that every family faces its own struggles—some lack money, while others lack time and emotional connection. Ultimately, Selvam seeks a way out of his situation, taking up a driving job abroad as a final attempt to restore balance and reclaim the peace he once had.

He leaves his job in Sharjah, not able to bear the separation from his family, and flies back home. The story turns again when Sampath asks Selvam to drop him at the station, because his wife asks him to travel with their daughter. Sampath reveals that he knew Selvam used his car for taxi services, and gives his car away to Selvam, saying that it was his wife's last wish.

The story ends when Selvam finally gets a pick up request, upon whose completion, Rs 5000 will be paid.

== Cast ==
- P. Samuthirakani as Selvam
- Gautham Vasudev Menon as Sampath
- Lakshmi Priyaa Chandramouli as Shanthi
- Abhinaya as Devi
- Karthik Kumar as the insurance advisor
- Badava Gopi as a Rideshare passenger
- Jangiri Madhumitha as a female Rideshare passenger
- Arjunan as the female Rideshare passenger's boyfriend
- Sankara Narayan V
- Haritha Parakod
- Kothandam
- Karan Chakravarthi

== Production ==
This film was directed by Ram Chakri and was his second film after Kurai Ondrum Illai (2014), for which he was credited as Karthik Ravi. It was produced by Arun Rangarajulu under Pathway Productions, photographed by Yuvaraj Dakshan and jointly edited by Jagan RV and Dinesh S.

== Music ==
The soundtrack was composed by Musicloud Studio and Technologies. It was claimed to introduce a technique called "Music as a Service" (MaaS). The first single, the title track, was released in September 2025. The single "Adada Adada" was released on 17 March 2026. The last single to release was "Ennai En".

Track listing
| No. | Title | Singer(s) | Length |
|---|---|---|---|
| 1. | "Carmeni" | Kulls, Shreya Sriranga | 3:02 |
| 2. | "Adada Adada" | K. S. Harisankar, Ajay Sathyan, Ruhee Ahamed, Jeevan Joy, Ajay Narayan Swamy | 2:55 |
| 3. | "Ennai En" | Rakshita Suresh, K.S. Harisankar, Shreya Sriranga | 4:12 |
| 4. | "Kuru Kuru" | Chinnaponnu, Anthony Daasan | 2:38 |
| Total length: | | | 12:47 |

== Release ==
The film was scheduled to be released theatrically on 17 October 2025, but eventually released on 3 April 2026.

== Reception ==
Abhinav Subramanian of The Times of India wrote, "We all know Samuthirakani is a very capable actor, but he keeps accepting more scripts than quality control allows, and this is one of those picks. Fleeting stretches of atmospheric cinematography and an orchestral score hint at something more textured, almost dreamlike, but they never hold". Jayabhuvaneshwari B of Cinema Express wrote, "In no way is Carmeni Selvam perfect. For some, it could come across as preachy. For some, it could be predictable". Metro India wrote, "Carmeni Selvam is a simple story told in an extraordinary way. With its strong emotional core and emphasis on family values, it is a must-watch for those who appreciate meaningful, heartfelt cinema". News Today wrote, "It may not rely on high drama, but its strength lies in its honesty, making it a thoughtful watch that quietly leaves behind an important message about living within one’s means and facing life with integrity". Dinamalar rated the film 2/5, criticising the writing in the second half and felt the editing was confusing.
