= Karthik Kumar =

Indian actor and comedian

- Born: 21 November 1977 (age 48); Chennai, India
- Occupations: Actor; Stand-up comedian
- Years active: 2000–2016; 2022–present
- Spouses: Suchitra (m. 2005–2017) Amrutha Srinivasan (m. 2021)

Comedy career
- Medium: Stand-up comedy
- Genres: Observational comedy, improvisational comedy, physical comedy, political satire
- Website: www.evamstanduptamasha.in

Karthik Kumar (born 21 November 1977) is an Indian stand-up comedian and actor who works in Tamil films and television.

== Early life and education ==
He studied chemical engineering in Sri Venkateswara College of Engineering. After earning his Bachelor's degree, Karthik and his friend Sunil Vishnu quit their jobs and started the event management company "Evam", which today is a theatre company.

== Career ==
Karthik made his acting debut with Alaipayuthey (2000) portraying a small role as the female lead character's prospective suitor. He was first tested for the role of R. Madhavan in the film but was rejected as he was too young with no acting experience at the time. He went on to portray supporting roles notably in films like Yaaradi Nee Mohini (2008) and Poi Solla Porom (2008).

In November 2016, Karthik lamented getting typecast in particular roles, especially as the American mappillai, and announced his retirement from the film industry. However, he returned with a role in Rocketry: The Nambi Effect (2022).

Karthik Kumar is also a stand-up comedian who has done three stand-up specials. His first special, "#PokeMe" has more than half a million views on YouTube. His second special was titled "Second Decoction" followed by "Blood Chutney" streaming on Amazon Prime. He has performed over 1000 shows across India, USA, UK, Singapore, Malaysia and Hong Kong. He is managed by Evam Standup Tamasha, a stand-up movement in South India.

== Personal life ==
Karthik Kumar married Suchitra, an RJ and singer, in 2005. The couple divorced in 2017. In December 2021, he married actress Amrutha Srinivasan. In 2024, Suchitra alleged that the reason for her divorce was that Karthik had homosexual encounters with his co-star Dhanush during the filming of Yaaradi Nee Mohini and even with Bollywood stars Shah Rukh Khan and Karan Johar.

== Filmography ==
=== Actor ===
| Year | Film | Role | Language | Notes |
|---|---|---|---|---|
| 2000 | Alaipayuthey | Shyam | Tamil | |
| 2002 | Saathiya | Shyam | Hindi | |
| 2004 | Vaanam Vasappadum | Karthik | Tamil | |
| 2004 | Yuva | Vishnu | Hindi | |
| 2005 | Kanda Naal Mudhal | Aravind | Tamil | |
| 2007 | Framed | Sanjay | English | Dubbed in Hindi as Sapno Ke Desh Mein |
| 2007 | Chaurahen | Nandu | English | |
| 2008 | Yaaradi Nee Mohini | Cheenu | Tamil | |
| 2008 | Poi Solla Porom | Uppilinathan | Tamil | |
| 2009 | Ninaithale Inikkum | Vasu | Tamil | |
| 2009 | Edhuvum Nadakkum | Naga | Tamil | |
| 2010 | Kola Kolaya Mundhirika | Krish | Tamil | |
| 2011 | Deiva Thirumagal | Karthik | Tamil | |
| 2011 | Veppam | Vishnu | Tamil | |
| 2015 | Pasanga 2 | Akhil | Tamil | |
| 2015 | Vellaiya Irukiravan Poi Solla Maatan | Dr. Raghu | Tamil | |
| 2017 | Ticket | Athif Hussain | Tamil | |
| 2018 | Mannar Vagaiyara | Arivazhagan | Tamil | |
| 2022 | Rocketry: The Nambi Effect | P. M. Nayar | Tamil / Hindi | |
| 2023 | Annapoorani | Chef Aswin | Tamil | |
| 2026 | Carmeni Selvam | Insurance advisor | Tamil | |
| 2026 | John Doe | Dr. Ranjan | Tamil | |

=== Director ===
| Year | Title | Notes |
|---|---|---|
| 2022 | Super Senior Heroes | Direct Television release in Sun TV |

=== Discography ===
| Year | Film | Song | Language | Composer | Co-singers |
|---|---|---|---|---|---|
| 2010 | Manmadan Ambu | "Oyyale" | Tamil | Devi Sri Prasad | Mukesh Mohamed, Suchitra |
| 2010 | Manmadha Banam (D) | "Uyyala" | Telugu | Devi Sri Prasad | Mukesh Mohamed, Suchitra |

=== Television ===
| Year | Title | Role | Language | Channel |
|---|---|---|---|---|
| 2012 | Dharmayutham | Arjun | Tamil | Vijay TV |
| 2025–present | Heart Beat | Dr. Vijay | Tamil | JioHotstar |

=== Voice artist ===
- For Atul Kulkarni in Aval (2017, Tamil)
