= Sun Naam Oruvar =

- Genre: Reality talk show
- Presented by: Vishal
- Country of origin: India
- Original language: Tamil
- No. of seasons: 01
- No. of episodes: 15

Production
- Producers: Nandha Durairaj; Ramana
- Production location: Chennai
- Camera setup: Multi-camera
- Running time: approx. 40–45 minutes per episode
- Production company: Rana Events

Original release
- Network: Sun TV
- Release: 7 October 2018 – 13 January 2019

Related
- Namma Ooru Hero; Memu Saitham

Sun Naam Oruvar is a 2018 – 2019 Tamil talk show telecasted on Sun TV at 9:30 PM on every Sunday which aired from 7 October 2018 to 13 January 2019. The TV programme was presented by actor and TFPC President Vishal who eventually made his television debut through this show. The TV show is the remake of Telugu language show Memu Saitham which was aired on Sun TV's subsidiary channel Gemini TV. The TV program is replaced by Namma Ooru Hero from 20 January 2019 which is hosted by Vijay Sethupathi.

== Rules ==
The celebrities who are part of the Tamil film industry (Kollywood) have to turn themselves into the concept of being common men and women among the society. They should help needy people by earning money through the course of the show and give that money that they earned to those people in order to achieve their dreams.

== Guests included ==
Episode	Guest(s)
1 (7 October 2018)	Karthi
2 (14 October 2018)	Keerthy Suresh
3 (21 October 2018)	Soori
4 (28 October 2018)	Andrea
5 (4 November 2018)	Jiiva
6 (11 November 2018)	Varalaxmi
7 (18 November 2018)	Aishwarya Rajesh
8 (25 November 2018)	R. Parthiepan
9 (2 December 2018)	Sathish
10 (9 December 2018)	Samuthirakani
11 (16 December 2018)	S. J. Surya
12 (23 December 2018)	Robo Shankar
13 (30 December 2018)	Khushbu
14 (6 January 2019)	Special Show
15 (13 January 2019)	Special Show
