= Karthikeya Murthy =

Indian composer

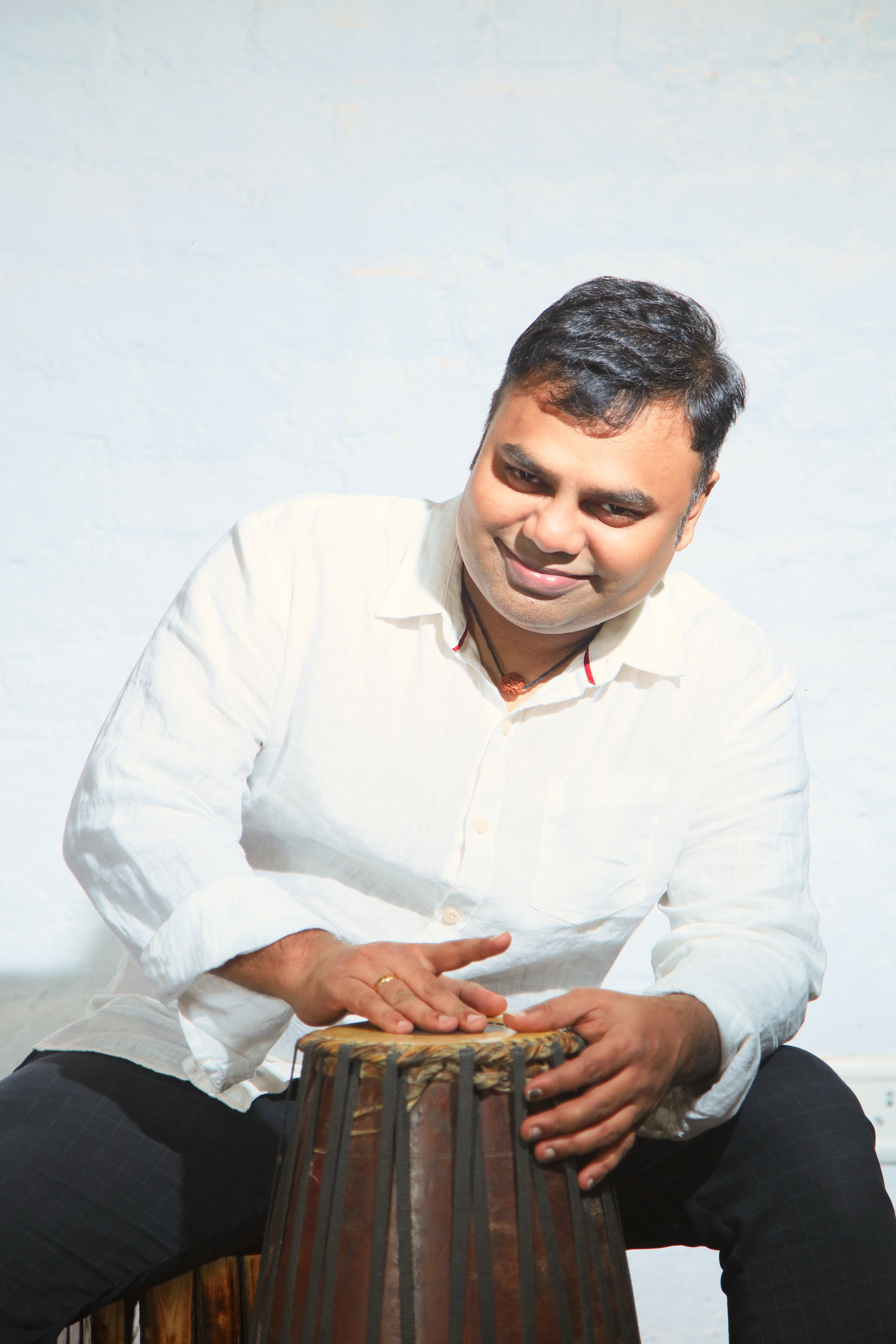

Background information
- Also known as: Karthik Iyer, KM
- Born: 16 May 1985 (age 41); Chennai, Tamil Nadu, India
- Genres: Film score, world music
- Occupations: Music composer, singer, songwriter, arranger
- Instruments: Piano, keyboard
- Years active: 2014–present
- Labels: Warner Music, Saregama, Think Music
- Website: karthikeyamurthy.com

Karthikeya Murthy is an Indian composer, singer-songwriter and music producer. A BAFTA Breakthrough India Talent. He made his debut in Tamil/Telugu bilingual movie Moone Moonu Varthai/Moodu Mukkallo Cheppalante (2015). He is known for his score in the movie KD (a) Karuppudurai.

== Personal life ==
Karthikeya was trained in Carnatic Classical Music by Chengalpet Ranganathan, DKJ.Sukanya, Premalatha and in Western Classical music by Abdul Sattar. Karthikeya is the grandson of ace mridangam player T.K.Murthy. His father T.K.Jayaraman was a music composer at All India Radio, Chennai. He is the 7th generation musician in his family with his musical roots tracing to Bowdeeshwara Bagavathar (Carnatic Singer), Thanu Bhagavathar (Carnatic Singer), Subramaniya Bhagavathar (Carnatic Singer), Thanu Subramaniya Bhagavathar (Violinist), Dr.T.K.Murthy (mridangam) and T.K.Jayaraman (Music Composer). His early ancestors were court musicians.

== Career ==
He began his career in music by forming a band in school known as Pro-teens which was later renamed to Madras Tunes for a band hunt competition in Sun TV. He then ventured into short films, ad films, documentaries as an independent composer before getting into films. As a part of Madras Tunes he won the band hunt show "Oh La La La" conducted by renowned music director A. R. Rahman and music label Saregama. Post winning and recording an album in Rahman's studio, he went on to write music for ace director K.Balachander's last stage show "Oru Koodai Paasam" under the stage name "Karthik Iyer". The music of the show was well appreciated with Hindu reviewing the music as "lilting and one of the good production values". He further did more theater works including the one for Dancer Dhananjayans and Olliyum Oliyum production's INSTINCT. Also he worked on several short films including the critically acclaimed Thuvandha Yuddham, Jagathinai Azhithidivom to name a few.

Acclaimed producer/singer/actor S.P.Charan met Karthikeya while recording a song for a college project that led him to rope Karthikeya as a composer in his production Moone Moonu Varthai directed by Madhumita - a bilingual (in Telugu Moodu Mukkallo Cheppalante). At the single launch show of the Moone Moonu Varthai, veteran singer S. P. Balasubrahmanyam for the very first time performed a song from the movie with Karthikeya on Piano during which he compared his music-composing prowess to that of Oscar-winning music director A. R. Rahman.

Karthikeya has composed title track & theme music for Vijay Television Tamil mythological serial Tamil Kadavul Murugan being aired from 2 October 2017 and actor Vijay Sethupathi starrer Namma Ooru Hero in Sun TV.

== Discography ==
MOVIES

Year	Title	Language	Notes
2023	Gowri Shankara	Kannada	Produced by N S Rajkumar
2023	Untitled	Hindi	Remake of a Malayalam Feature film
2023	La Mirada Oculata	Spanish	In collaboration with Ms. Victoria De La Vega
2023	Amma's Pride	Tamil	Based on first legal transgender marriage in TN
2019	K.D.	Tamil	
2017	Moodu Mukkallo Cheppalante	Telugu	
2015	Moone Moonu Varthai	Tamil	

TV SERIES

Year	Title	Language	Channel	Notes
2022	Putham Puthu Kaalai - Vidiyaadhaa - Mouname Paarvaiyaai	Tamil	Amazon Prime	
2021	LOL Enga Siri Paapom	Tamil	Amazon Prime	starring Vivek
2019	Namma Ooru Hero	Tamil	Sun TV	starring Vijay Sethupathi
2017	Tamil Kadavul Murugan	Tamil	Star Vijay	

THEATRE WORKS

Year	Title	Language	Notes
2011	The Instinct	Tamil	
2010	Oru Koodai Paasam	Tamil	Directed by K.Balachander
2009	Folk Dance of India	Multi	Directed by Dhananjayans

NOTABLE SINGLES

Title	Publisher	Notes
Yaar Veetilo	Doopaadoo	Feat. Karky (lyrics) and Andrea Jermiah
Jigulu Jigulu	Star Vijay	
Country Side	Put Chutney Music	Feat. Madras Tunes
Neeye Neeye	Trend Music	
A capella	Put Chutney Music	Feat. Santhosh Narayanan Songs
Roots of Jazz	Put Chutney Music	Feat. Madras Tunes
Naatai	Put Chutney Music	Feat. Madras Tunes

== Awards & Recognitions ==
- 2021 - BAFTA Breakthrough (India) Honoree - BAFTA
- 2021 - Special Mention Original Score (Sweetness) - FICOCC
- 2021 - Honorable Mention Original Score (Sweetness) - SFAAF
