= Moone Moonu Varthai =

2015 Indian film by Madhumita

- Poster in Tamil
- Directed by: Madhumita
- Written by: Madhumita
- Produced by: S. P. B. Charan
- Starring: Arjun Chidambaram; Rakendu Mouli; Aditi Chengappa; Venkatesh Harinathan
- Cinematography: Srinivasan Venkatesh
- Edited by: Kiran Kanti
- Music by: Karthikeya Murthy
- Production company: Capital Film Works
- Release dates: 13 March 2015 (Telugu); 26 June 2015 (Tamil)
- Country: India
- Languages: Tamil; Telugu

Moone Moonu Varthai (transl. Just three words) is a 2015 Indian comedy film written and directed by Madhumita. The film stars Arjun Chidambaram, Aditi Chengappa and Venkatesh Harinathan. It was simultaneously made in Tamil and Telugu with the latter version titled Moodu Mukkallo Cheppalante (transl. To say in three words) with Rakendu Mouli replacing Chidambaram and a slightly different supporting cast. The film is produced by S. P. B. Charan and marks the debut of several technicians, including the music director Karthikeya Murthy, the art director Mani Karthik and the editor Kiran Ganti.

== Plot ==
In a hospital, Arjun narrates his story to Bhagyaraj / 'Idly' Vishwanath who became a flop director and searches for a different story.

Arjun is a talented and carefree youngster who always changes job and wants to lead a carefree life. Having lost his parents, he was raised by his grandparents. His grandfather Subramanyam taunts him for not being responsible but has a soft spot for his grandson. On the other hand, his grandmother is easygoing but is worried about nonchalant attitude.

His best friend Karna, a frustrated IT employee who always butters his boss to save his job, because of Arjun which leads to some comical circumstances finally loses his job. Meanwhile, Arjun's grandparents went to United States to give a visit of their grand daughter who is pregnant. While going his grandfather completely restricts Arjun through financially and he rented his house to his friend and secretly they hopes Arjun to become responsible. So being homeless he came to Karna's home to stay for three months though Karna was angry on him but he allows him to stay and later they makeover.

Arjun and Karna decided to start a business which should be different from others. In a bar they accidentally meet another frustrated drunk IT employee called Muddu Krishna who was very angry on his boss and gives him an offer to conveys his frustration to his boss. Then the drunk duo accepts his offer and they went to his boss residence and scolds him and runs away.

The next morning, realising what they have done Karna is tense but Arjun encourages him to take this act as a business. They convey the bad messages of their clients who cannot convey it to their beloved ones but they need to do. They earn money and promote their services through the rinternet and soon earn some more.

Meanwhile, the duo start wooing Anjali and Keerthi, IT professionals who are new to their locality. Soon Anjali falls in love with Arjun but Keerthi rejects Karna's proposal because she has been in love with someone else for two years.

Meanwhile, one of their assignments they went for a marriage they successfully convey the message to Bridegroom's father that 'Bride is loving someone and she was not interested in the marriage and her family was forcing to do' then the chaos ensues the Bride Darshini and her family denies all the allegations are false and they questions who informed them the false statements. Understanding the situation is going out of hands the duo leaves from the place secretly on the notice of Darshini. Later Karna founds that the client Srinivas who is the bridegroom had lied to them to call off his marriage then feeling bad the duo went to Darshini's hometown to apologize her for their act. But there Arjun is stunned to see Anjali as Darshini's younger sister. However he managed from her and returned with Karna. On Karna's insistence they decided to kept it as secret.

Later in a critical circumstance ensues on another assignment they went to convey the new recruits in a company was actually lost their jobs due to recession. The families are hurt after hearing the news and they taunt them severely. Later Arjun's sister calls him to inform that their grandmother had injured her leg. After hearing this Arjun feels sad which thinking their taunts as a bad omen and decided to tell the truth to Anjali. Then he came to tell the truth then Darshini is at her home recognized him and scolds him. Then Arjun tries to apologize to both the sisters but Anjali breaks up with him.

Later in another assignment Arjun is suspicious and he cancels it which angers Karna and they quarrel, which leads to break up their friendship. Arjun's grandparents came back from the states after observing his new behaviour (actually they are expected the same behavior from him) and they question him. A depressed Arjun quarrels with them. However Subramaniam makes the situation cool and suggests him to set it right. Later Arjun ask apologies to his grandparents.

Meanwhile, Karna comes to Keerthi's office and reveals that her lover is a fraudster who used his service to convey his breakup with her. Keerthi feels sad and Karna tells that he came to her out of friendship and not for his business. Later Arjun comes to his home and they both patch up and decide to leave this business and do jobs again. Later however the duo proved the Srinivas is a fraud who is marrying another girl rather than his loved one (which is the prime reason to call off Darshini's marriage) and set it right.

Later Karna learned that Anjali is leaving it may forever the feared Arjun chases her to stop. But the story was interrupted by a nurse for an emergency issue. The director became tensed to know the climax it makes some comical circumstances and in the ICU he was shocked to see Keerthi in the emergency ward absence of Anjali and Karna thinking that Arjun married Keerthi. Then Keerthi baring her labor pains and reveals to Idly that he was successfully married Karna a year ago and Arjun and Anjali are going to marry in a week meanwhile Karna and Anjali comes to safeguard her with doctors. After looking this incident Idly feels happy to have found a new story for directing his next film. Then the film ends with Karna breaking the fourth wall and revealing the climax with his swear word 'in my family'.

== Cast ==
Cast (Tamil)	Cast (Telugu)	Role (Tamil)	Role (Telugu)
Arjun Chidambaram	Rakendu Mouli	Arjun	Arjun
Aditi Chengappa		Anjali	Anjali
Venkatesh Harinathan		Karna	Karna
Darshana Rajendran		Keerthi	Keerthi
S. P. Balasubrahmanyam		Subramaniam	Subramaniam
Lakshmi		Malini	Lakshmi
S. P. Charan		Seturaman	Muddhu Krishna
Nithin Sathya		Karthik	Karthik
K. Bhagyaraj	Brahmanandam	Bhagyaraj	"Idly" Vishwanath
M. S. Bhaskar		Raaman	Rama Rao
Tanikella Bharani		Dhayanidhi	Dhayanidhi
Aarthi Ganeshkar		Raaman's wife	Rama Rao's wife
Robo Shankar	Ali	Veera Dheera Parakrama; Sivasubramani a.k.a. Veerasamy	Samarasimha Reddy
Raja Ravindra		Anjali's father	Anjali's father
Badava Gopi		Karna's boss	Karna's boss
Boys Rajan		Interviewer	Interviewer
Kadambari Kiran		Nachiappan	Muddhu Krishna's boss
Vishalini Diana		Darshini	Darshini
Rekha Suresh		Doctor	Doctor
Robert		Special appearance in the song "Ketta News"/"Newse Mose"	Special appearance in the song "Ketta News"/"Newse Mose"

== Soundtrack ==
Karthikeya Murthy composed the soundtrack for this film, consisting of five songs and three instrumental tracks. On 7 January 2015, two songs from the movie were released as singles at Luxe Cinemas, Phoenix Mall where S. P. Balasubrahmanyam performed Vaazhum Naal, a solo song penned by lyricist Ko Sesha and Porruppu to Parruppu was sung by the music composer himself. The album received positive reviews from critics

The Times of India rated the album 3/5 stating "On the whole, an impressive debut by Karthikeya Murthy" (Tamil version). Behindwoods rated the album at 2.50/5 stating the "Moone Moonu Varthai is a fun-filled album from Karthikeya" (Tamil version).

Tamil Track listing
No.	Title	Lyrics	Singer(s)	Length
1.	"Pa Paba Pa"	Sabarivaasan	S. P. B. Charan, Mukesh Mohamed	4:19
2.	"Ketta News"	Subu	S. P. B. Charan, Ilaiyaraja, Rajiv Rajaram	4:23
3.	"Height of Bad News"	—	—	2:14
4.	"Saayore Saayore"	Madhan Karky	Karthikeya Murthy, Latha Krishna, Keerthana Nath, Sooraj Santosh	3:59
5.	"Irish Coffee Duel"	—	—	1:28
6.	"Porruppu To Parruppu"	Karthikeya Murthy, Dongli Jumbo	Rakendu Mouli, Venky	2:11
7.	"Salsa Ki Jalsa"			1:38
8.	"Vaazhum Naal"	Ko Sesha	S. P. Balasubrahmanyam	2:54
Total length:				22:33

Telugu Track listing
No.	Title	Lyrics	Singer(s)	Length
1.	"Pa Paba Pa"	Rakendu Mouli	S. P. B. Charan, Mukesh Mohamed	4:19
2.	"Newse Mose"	Kittu Vissapragada	S. P. B. Charan, Rakendu Mouli	4:23
3.	"Height of Bad News"	—	—	2:14
4.	"Maayore Maayore"	Vennelakanti	Karthikeya Murthy, Keerthana Nath, Sooraj Santosh	3:59
5.	"Irish Coffee Duel"	—	—	1:28
6.	"Bewarse to Business Mode"	Rakendu Mouli	Rakendu Mouli	2:11
7.	"Salsa Ki Jalsa"			1:38
8.	"Thoduga Ne Needaga"	Rakendu Mouli	S. P. Balasubrahmanyam	2:54
Total length:				22:33

== Reception ==
Moone Moonu Varthai

Moodu Mukkallo Cheppalante

Reviewing the film on aha, a critic from Binged.com rated the film 2/5 and wrote, "Overall, Moodu Mukkalo Cheppalante is a silly fun movie that comes across as a ‘silly attempt’ to be taken seriously".
