= Kaalidhar Laapata =

2025 Indian Hindi film

- Official release poster
- Directed by: Madhumita
- Written by: Madhumita; Amitosh Nagpal
- Based on: K.D. (Tamil) by Madhumita
- Produced by: Monisha Advani; Madhu Bhojwani; Nikkhil Advani; Umesh KR Bansal; Pragati Deshmukh
- Starring: Abhishek Bachchan; Mohammed Zeeshan Ayyub; Daivik Baghela; Nimrat Kaur
- Cinematography: Gairik Sarkar
- Edited by: Gairik Sarkar
- Music by: Songs: Amit Trivedi; Background Score: Tajdar Junaid
- Production companies: Zee Studios; Emmay Entertainment
- Distributed by: ZEE5
- Release date: 14 August 2025
- Running time: 109 minutes
- Country: India
- Language: Hindi

Kaalidhar Laapata (transl. Kaalidhar is missing) is a 2025 Indian Hindi-language drama film written and directed by Madhumita. The film stars Abhishek Bachchan in the lead role as Kaalidhar, alongside Mohammed Zeeshan Ayyub and child actor Daivik Baghela in supporting roles. Produced by Zee Studios and Emmay Entertainment, it is the Hindi remake of Madhumita's 2019 Tamil film K.D.

It premiered on the ZEE5 streaming platform on 4 July 2025 to mixed reviews.

== Plot ==
The story follows Kaalidhar, a middle-aged man experiencing memory loss and a sense of abandonment after overhearing his family's plan to leave him behind during a religious gathering. Choosing to leave on his own, Kaalidhar embarks on a journey during which he meets Ballu, an eight-year-old orphan. The unlikely duo forms a bond and sets out on a road trip across India to fulfill items on Kaalidhar's bucket list, leading him to rediscover joy and purpose.

== Cast ==
- Abhishek Bachchan as Kaalidhar (KD)
- Mohammed Zeeshan Ayyub as Subodh
- Daivik Baghela as Ballu
- Nimrat Kaur as Meera (Special appearance)
- Vishwanath Chatterjee as Manohar
- Madhulika Jatoliya as Neetu
- Priyank Tiwari as Sundar
- Priya Yadav as Gudiya

== Production ==
Kaalidhar Laapata is Madhumita's first Hindi-language feature film. It is a remake of her Tamil movie K.D. (Karuppu Durai) (2019). The film was produced by Monisha Advani, Madhu Bhojwani, Nikkhil Advani, Umesh Kr Bansal, and Pragati Deshmukh under the banners of Zee Studios and Emmay Entertainment. Principal photography took place in Madhya Pradesh, India.

== Soundtrack ==
Kaalidhar Laapata

Soundtrack album by Amit Trivedi
- Released: 23 June 2025
- Recorded: 2024–2025
- Genre: Feature film soundtrack
- Length: 10:59
- Language: Hindi
- Label: Zee Music Company

Amit Trivedi chronology
Azaad (2025)	Kaalidhar Laapata (2025)
External audio
- Kaalidhar Laapata - Full Album on YouTube

The music of the film is composed by Amit Trivedi while lyrics are written by Geet Sagar.

The Original Background Score is composed by Tajdar Junaid.

Track listing
No.	Title	Lyrics	Singer(s)	Length
1.	"Dil Banjaara"	Geet Sagar	Raghav Chaitanya	3:38
2.	"Hans Ke Jaane De"		Chirag Kotwal, Amit Trivedi, Rajiv Sundaresan, Rishikesh Kamerkar, Arun Kamath	3:46
3.	"Haseen Pareshaaniyaan"		Jubin Nautiyal, Shahid Mallya, Deepali Sathe	3:35
Total length:				10:59

== Release ==
The film is scheduled for an exclusive direct-to-digital release on ZEE5 on 4 July 2025.

== Reception ==
On the review aggregator website Rotten Tomatoes, 80% of 10 critics' reviews are positive, with an average rating of 6.5/10. Indicating mixed or average reviews. Shubhra Gupta of The Indian Express gave 2 stars out of 5 and writes that "Child actor Daivik, a wide smile lighting up his face, is a natural. He settles into a rhythm which makes their journey somewhat palatable: it is Abhishek Bachchan who struggles to match up."

Shweta Keshri of India Today rated 3/5 stars and said "'Kaalidhar Laapata' reminds us that life can surprise us with joy, even in tough times. And shows how friendship can cross age barriers, healing our pained hearts." Snehal Dhingra of Times Now gave 4 stars out of 5 and said that "Abhishek Bachchan once again proves his emotional depth in this film, delivering a performance that brings life and connection to the screen."

Devesh Sharma of Filmfare rated 3.5/5 stars and said that "This is a film that doesn’t shout. It meanders, like memory. But stay with it, and you’ll be rewarded with a story that not only brings a smile to your face but also stays long after the credits roll." Deepa Gahlot of Rediff.com gave 2.5 stars out of 5 and commented that "Watch Kaalidhar Laapata because clean family-viewing films are getting scarcer by the week." Rahul Desai of The Hollywood Reporter India observed that "Abhishek Bachchan stars as a dementia-afflicted character in this 'Baghban'-coded remake of a Tamil film."

Shilajit Mitra of The Hindu observed that "A man goes on a transformative journey in a safely placid film." Sreeparna Sengupta of The Times of India gave 3.5 stars out of 5 and said that "'Kaalidhar Laapata' is a touching, slice-of-life drama that ends on an uplifting note and makes for a decent watch." Nandini Ramnath of Scroll.in said that "While Kaalidhar Laapata is sluggishly paced and doesn’t capture the sheer ordinariness of its anguished hero or his milieu, the remake does portray the ways in which love and empathy transcend familial ties."

Swathi P. Ajith of Onmanorama described the film as "an emotionally ambitious but uneven drama," noting that Abhishek Bachchan "anchors" the story effectively. Abhishek Srivastava of Moneycontrol wrote that Bachchan "shines in a film that has heart and soul but somehow forgets to feel." Shreyanka Mazumdar of News18 rated 2.5 out of 5 stars, stating, "Kaalidhar Laapata is a film that means well but delivers too little. Daivik Baghela's delightful performance and Abhishek Bachchan’s restraint offer moments of charm, but they are trapped in a film that doesn’t know how to fully use them." Similarly, Jaya Dwivedi of India TV gave it 2.5 out of 5 stars and remarked that "Abhishek Bachchan shines in parts but the film falls short of expectations." Kaashif Hajee of The Quint rated the film 2 out of 5 stars, commenting that "earnest performances can’t save this remake." In contrast, Sajin Shrijith of The Week offered a more favorable view, stating that "Abhishek Bachchan is in top form in an imperfect, yet necessary film."
