= Madhumitha (director) =

Indian film director

- Born: Madhumitha Sundararaman; Chennai, Tamil Nadu, India
- Occupations: Director, writer
- Years active: 2008–present

Madhumitha is a Tamil film director.

== Career ==
Madhumita was born in Chennai, Tamil Nadu, India and grew up in Indonesia. She later moved to Singapore for college and did her master's degree in Los Angeles, US.

During her stay in Singapore she made several short films, one of which won the best of the world category in BBC and she was honoured with the Singapore Student Award. In USA, she briefly worked with the Pirates of the Caribbean team before returning to Chennai to become a film director.

Her debut film was the romantic drama Vallamai Tharayo starring R. Parthipan and Chaya Singh. In spite of mixed reviews, with Sify calling her direction "amateurish", the film completed a 100 days-run at the box office and won the Tamil Nadu State Film Award for Best Family Film in 2008. According to Madhumitha, the film was also screened at various international film festivals including the Newport Beach Film Festival in Los Angeles. Her second film was the comedy flick Kola Kolaya Mundhirika, which was co-written by Crazy Mohan. After a five-years hiatus, 2015 will see the release of her next projects, the bilingual romantic comedies, Moone Moonu Varthai (Tamil) / Moodu Mukkallo Cheppalante.

== Filmography ==
Year	Film	Language	Notes
2008	Vallamai Tharayo	Tamil	Tamil Nadu State Film Award for Best Family Film
2010	Kola Kolaya Mundhirika	Tamil	
2015	Moone Moonu Varthai	Tamil; Telugu	Simultaneously shot in Telugu as Moodu Mukkallo Cheppalante
2019	K. D.	Tamil	
2022	Putham Pudhu Kaalai Vidiyaadhaa	Tamil	Segment: Mouname Paarvayaai
2025	Kaalidhar Laapata	Hindi	Remake of K.D.
2026	Love Always	Tamil	Web Series, Remake of We are so over or... Not
2026	John Doe	Tamil	
