= Adithya Varma (soundtrack) =

Soundtrack album by Radhan
- Released: 18 October 2019
- Recorded: 2019
- Genre: Feature film soundtrack
- Length: 26:45
- Language: Tamil
- Label: Aditya Music
- Producer: Radhan

Radhan chronology
RDX Love (2019)	Adithya Varma (2019)	Amaram Akhilam Prema (2020)
External audio
- Audio Jukebox on YouTube

Singles from Adithya Varma
- 1. "Edharkadi" Released: 16 August 2019; 2. "Yaen Ennai Pirindhaai" Released: 23 September 2019

Adithya Varma is the soundtrack album to the 2019 film of the same name directed by Gireesaya; a remake of the Telugu film Arjun Reddy (2017), it stars Dhruv Vikram in his acting debut. The film's soundtrack was provided by Radhan with lyrics written by Thamarai, Vivek, Viveka, Sivakarthikeyan, Dhruv and Radhan himself. The songs "Edharkadi" and "Yaen Ennai Pirindhaai" were released as singles prior to the album on 18 October 2019, which featured seven tracks.

== Background ==
The film's soundtrack was composed by Radhan who also scored for Arjun Reddy. Harshavardhan Rameshwar who also worked in the original film and its Hindi remake Kabir Singh (2019), retained the background score from the two films. Likewise, Radhan also retained most of the songs from the original film, with the exception of "Telisindey Naa Nuvvey (The Breakup Song)", where instead, an original song "Yaen Ennai Pirindhaai" was composed.

Previously, Radhan was involved in the first version of the proposed remake, Varmaa directed by Bala. He also composed new songs for the film, one of them being titled "Vaanodum Mannodum", written by Vairamuthu and sung by Vignesh G. was released on 27 December 2018 as a single. That song was not included in this version. Besides acting, Dhruv made his debut as a playback singer and lyricist through the song "Edharkadi". The audio rights were acquired by Aditya Music.

== Release ==
The song "Edharkadi" was released as the film's first single on 16 August 2019. Another single, "Yaen Ennai Pirindhaai", sung by Sid Sriram was released on 23 September 2019, which coincided with the lead actor's birthday. The rest of the songs, along with the full album was released on 18 October 2019, at a launch event held at Sathyam Cinemas in Chennai, with the presence of the cast and crew, with actor Vikram preceding the event.

Aditya Music released two additional songs, post the film's release: "Nenjukulle" (based on "Gundelona" from Arjun Reddy), written by Mohan Rajan and sung by Shweta Mohan, and an instrumental number titled "Aditya Varma Theme" which has vocals from Dhruv himself.

== Reception ==
Writing for The Times of India, Sruthi Raman reviewed "The album's smart soundtrack ends up evoking memories of Radhan's best work." Janani K. of India Today wrote "Composer Radhan's background score is the soul of the film. When the theme music plays, you can't help but watch Dhruv waltz through the frame with much aplomb. The background music and the songs are almost the same with just a change in lyrics."

== Track listing ==
No.	Title	Lyrics	Singer(s)	Length
1.	"Edharkadi"	Vivek, Dhruv Vikram	Dhruv Vikram	4:09
2.	"Yaen Ennai Pirindhaai"	Radhan	Sid Sriram	3:18
3.	"Dhooram"	Viveka	Dhvani Bhanushali	3:04
4.	"Yaarumillaa"	Vivek	Sid Sriram	4:08
5.	"Kanaa"	Thamarai	Krithika Nelson	2:56
6.	"Amudhangalaal"	Thamarai	Priyanka	5:45
7.	"Idhu Enna Maayamo"	Sivakarthikeyan	Ranjith Govind	3:22
Total length:				26:45

Bonus songs
No.	Title	Lyrics	Singer(s)	Length
8.	"Nenjukulle"	Mohan Rajan	Shweta Mohan	4:02
9.	"Adithya Varma Theme"	—	Dhruv Vikram	0:49
Total length:				31:36
