= Adithya Varma =

2019 film directed by Gireesaaya

- Theatrical release poster
- Directed by: Gireeshaaya
- Based on: Arjun Reddy by Sandeep Reddy Vanga
- Produced by: Mukesh Mehta
- Starring: Dhruv Vikram; Banita Sandhu
- Cinematography: Ravi K. Chandran
- Edited by: Vivek Harshan
- Music by: Soundtrack: Radhan; Score: Harshavardhan Rameshwar
- Production company: E4 Entertainment
- Distributed by: E4 Entertainment
- Release dates: 21 November 2019 (worldwide); 22 November 2019 (India)
- Running time: 167 minutes
- Country: India
- Language: Tamil

Adithya Varma is a 2019 Indian Tamil-language romantic drama film directed by Gireeshaaya in his directorial debut and produced by Mukesh Mehta under E4 Entertainment. The film stars Dhruv Vikram in his acting debut and Banita Sandhu in her Tamil debut, while Priya Anand appears in a supporting role. A remake of the Telugu film Arjun Reddy (2017) directed by Sandeep Reddy Vanga, it follows the titular character, a high-functioning alcoholic surgeon who has anger management problems. He pushes himself down a self-destructive path after the marriage of his girlfriend Meera; following which, the film focuses on his downfall and subsequent resurgence.

The film was originally directed by Bala under the title Varmaa and shot between March and September 2018; however, in February 2019, due to creative differences, E4 Entertainment decided to re-launch it with a new cast and crew; only Dhruv and music composer Radhan were retained. While the original version had cinematography and editing by M. Sukumar and Sathish Suriya, the new version had Ravi K. Chandran and Vivek Harshan. The new version, titled Adithya Varma, began filming in March 2019 and ended in May.

Originally scheduled to release on 8 November 2019, the film was postponed due to distribution issues. The film was released worldwide on 21 November 2019, and in India, the next day. The film opened to positive reviews from critics and became a successful venture at the box office. Dhruv was awarded the Best Debut Actor at the 13th Ananda Vikatan Cinema Awards and Zee Cine Awards Tamil.

== Plot ==
Adithya Varma is the youngest son of wealthy business tycoon Vasudevan Varma. He is studying MBBS in Mangalore, India. Despite being a brilliant student, he has severe anger management issues that earn the wrath of the dean of the college. Adithya's aggressive nature also earned him a reputation among his juniors as a college bully. After having a brawl alongside his friend Tarun against members of the opposing team during an inter-college football match, the dean asks Adithya to either apologise or leave the college. Adithya initially chooses to leave, but stays back after meeting an introverted first-year student, Meera Shetty because he experienced love at first sight.

Adithya and his friend Parthi enter a third-year classroom and announce that Adithya is in love with Meera and asserts that she is exclusive to him. Initially afraid, Meera starts adjusting herself to Adithya's overbearing attitude. She eventually reciprocates his feelings and they develop an intimate relationship. Adithya graduates with an MBBS degree and leaves for Mussoorie to pursue a master's degree in orthopaedic surgery. Over the course of three years, Adithya's and Meera's relationship becomes stronger. Months later, Adithya visits Meera's house, where her father Manohar Shetty sees them kissing and throws Adithya out.

Manohar opposes her and Adithya's relationship due to Adithya's brash behaviour and also because they belong to different castes. Adithya demands that Meera must make a decision within six hours; otherwise he will end their relationship. Following this incident, Meera's parents seize her phone, making her unable to contact Adithya. By the time she manages to visit Adithya's house, he is drunk, injects morphine into himself, and becomes unconscious for two days. Meera is then forcibly married to someone from her caste. Adhi learns about the marriage from Parthi and goes to her house in protest. He is assaulted and gets arrested for making a scene. Adhi's father, Vasudevan Varma, ostracises him from the family home for damaging his reputation.

With Parthi's help, Adhi finds a rented apartment and joins a private hospital as a surgeon. To cope with his emotions, he starts taking drugs, attempts one-night stands, buys a pet dog and names it after Meera and drinks alcohol; all of which are unsuccessful. Within months, he becomes a highly successful surgeon and a high-functioning alcoholic who is both respected and feared by the hospital's staff members, one of the reasons being his high surgery count. Adhi's self-destructive behaviour and refusal to move on worry Parthi and Tarun. He persuades one of his patients, Priya Menen, a leading film star, to have a no-strings relationship with him, which he ends when she falls in love with him.

On a day off, Adhi unwillingly agrees to perform life-saving surgery and collapses with dehydration. The hospital staff examine his blood samples, which show traces of alcohol and cocaine. The hospital chief files a case against Adhitya, who accepts the truth on the grounds of violating his professional ethics during an in-house court hearing, despite Parthi making arrangements to bail him out. Adhi's medical license is cancelled for five years and he is evicted from the flat. The next morning, Parthi manages to reach Adithya to convey his grandmother's death; he meets Vasudevan, and they reconcile. Adhi gives up his self-destructive habits soon after.

While leaving for a vacation, Adhi sees a pregnant Meera sitting in a park. Convinced that she is unhappy with her marriage, Adhi meets her after returning from his vacation. Meera reveals that she left her husband days after their marriage and continued to work in a clinic. She tells Adhi that he is the child's father, and they reunite. The pair marries, and Meera's father apologises for misunderstanding their love for each other.

== Cast ==
- Dhruv Vikram as Dr. Adithya Varma (a.k.a. "Adi"), an alcoholic surgeon
- Banita Sandhu as Dr. Meera Shetty, Aditya's lover
- Priya Anand as Priya Menen, an actress who consults Dr. Adi for treatment but later she falls in love with him
- Raja as Vasudevan Varma, Adithya's father
- Dheepa Ramanujam as Bhavani Varma, Adithya's mother
- Anbu Thasan as Dr. Parthi, Adithya's best friend
- Ashwin Kumar Lakshmikanthan as Siddharth Varma, Adithya's brother
- Soundariya Nanjundan as Dr. Keerthy, Adithya's friend
- Gireesh Krish Nair as medical college Dean
- Kartavya Kabra as Samar (Aditya's enemy)
- Dhanush as Dr .Tharun, Adithya's friend also Keerthy's lover
- Leela Samson as Adithya's grandmother
- Achyuth Kumar as Manohar Shetty, Meera's father
- Meena Vemuri as Mallika Shetty, Meera's mother
- Usha Elizabeth as Usha, Adithya's maid
- Alekhya Harika as Nurse
- Bhagyalakshmi as Judge
- Bagavathi Perumal as Lawyer
- Anitha Sampath as Newsreader

Additionally, Priya Anand's Shih Tzu Bumblebee plays the title character's pet dog. Vikram made an uncredited cameo appearance in the song "Dhooram" as a visitor in Dehradun.

== Production ==
=== Original ===
In September 2017, it was announced that E4 Entertainment had bought the rights to remake the Telugu film Arjun Reddy (2017) in Tamil and Malayalam languages. The following month, Bala was chosen to direct the yet-untitled Tamil remake. On 10 November 2017, the title was announced as Varma, later amended to Varmaa. Raju Murugan was chosen to pen the dialogues. M. Sukumar was selected to handle the cinematography and Sathish Suriya was chosen as the film editor, after having earlier worked for Bala's Naachiyaar (2018). Producer Mukesh Mehta said the remake would be 20 minutes shorter than the Telugu original. Actor Vikram's son Dhruv Vikram was cast as the male lead, in what would have been his acting debut. It would have been the debut for the Kolkata-based model Megha Chowdhury, who was chosen to play the female lead. Akash Premkumar was chosen to play the lead character's best friend.

Principal photography began in early March 2018 at Kathmandu, Nepal, and a week later, after completing the first schedule there, the crew shifted to Chennai for the second schedule. However, shooting of the film was briefly stalled due to the Tamil Film Producers Council strike, but resumed in April after the strike ended. The final schedule of the film took place in August 2018, for which the team had shifted to Tiruvannamalai. It was completed in September 2018, thus principal photography of the film has wrapped.

=== New version ===
On 7 February 2019, E4 Entertainment issued a press statement stating that they would go for a re-shoot of the entire film as they were not satisfied with the final cut provided by Bala. They added that the film would be relaunched with a completely new cast and crew while retaining Dhruv. Bala decried these comments, saying it was his own decision to quit the film "in order to safeguard creative freedom" because he was asked to make changes. This became the first such incident in the history of Tamil cinema that the producer of the film refuses to release the film due to unsatisfactory final cut despite the completion of the film. On 19 February 2019, the new title Adithya Varma was announced.

Mehta said the new version would begin filming in March 2019, with Arjun Reddy writer-director Sandeep Reddy Vanga's assistant Gireesaaya was announced as the new director, making his directorial debut. Banita Sandhu was announced as the heroine, in her Tamil film debut, as well as Priya Anand as the supporting actress. Anbu Thasan joined the cast in March as the title character's friend, replacing Akash Premkumar. Ravi K. Chandran and Vivek Harshan were announced as the cinematographer and the editor respectively. Principal photography for Adithya Varma began on 11 March. Following the filming of a song sequence in Portugal (including Lisbon) in mid-April 2019, 65% of the film's shoot was complete. Major portions of the film had been completed in mid-May, with the exception of patchwork scenes, for which Ravi K. Chandran's son Santhana Krishnan handled the cinematography. Principal photography wrapped in July 2019.

== Music ==
The film's soundtrack and score were respectively provided by Radhan and Harshavardhan Rameshwar, who also contributed for Arjun Reddy. The soundtrack album was preceded by two singles: "Edharkadi" and "Yaen Ennai Pirindhaai", released on 16 August and 23 September 2019, respectively. The album in its entirety was launched on 18 October 2019. For all the songs (with the exception of "Yaen Ennai Pirindhaai"), Radhan reused the tunes from his own compositions from Arjun Reddy.

== Release ==
Adithya Varma was initially scheduled to release on 8 November 2019. In a turn of events, the makers postponed the release due to distribution problems and did not initially reveal the new release date. Later, the makers announced that the film will be released on 21 November 2019.

Adithya Varma was given an A certificate, from the Central Board of Film Certification, despite the makers of the film hoping it would receive a U/A certificate. E4 later pushed the film's Indian release to 22 November, a day after the worldwide release. Shakthi Film Factory acquired the film's Tamil Nadu distribution rights when it was titled Varmaa, but E4 later acquired them for Adithya Varma. The film opened in 350 screens worldwide, making it the biggest for a debut hero's film, and according to trade analyst Sreedhar Pillai, the film had made a pre-release business of ₹16 crore (US$1.7 million), including the theatrical, digital and satellite rights. Adithya Varma collected ₹6.86 crore (US$710,000) during its opening weekend.

== Marketing ==
The teaser trailer for Varmaa was released on 23 September 2018. It was widely ridiculed and criticised on social media, while a critic from The New Indian Express called it "a failed attempt to remake the original". The teaser for Adithya Varma was released on 16 June 2019. It was positively received by a number of critics, in contrast to the teaser for Varmaa. The official trailer of the film was unveiled on 19 October 2019, coinciding with the film's audio launch event.

== Home media ==
The film's television premiere took place on Sun TV on 26 January 2020, coinciding with Republic Day.

== Reception ==
Adithya Varma received positive reviews from critics praising the performance of Dhruv, and the adaptation of the film from the original. M. Suganth of The Times of India gave 3.5 out of 5 stars rating "A well-made, if overtly faithful, remake of Arjun Reddy with Dhruv". India Today gave 3 out of 5 stars stating "Dhruv Vikram makes a strong debut with Adithya Varma, but the story gets repetitive if you have watched Arjun Reddy and Kabir Singh." Sify rated 3.5 out of 5 and summarised "Adithya Varma has proved that Dhruv is a super talented performer who can be the next chocolate boy of Tamil cinema."

Hindustan Times reviewed it as "The highlight of this faithful remake of Telugu hit Arjun Reddy is the performance of debutant Dhruv Vikram. He is refreshing and sincere as a flawed medical student." Sreedhar Pillai, writing for Firstpost gave 3.25 out of 5 and reviewed "Adithya Varma is a raw and hard-hitting film which rides on Dhruv Vikram's performance. This is a star in the making; truly, a chip off the old block." The Indian Express gave the film 3 out of 5 stated "Dhruv Vikram shines in this faithfully-remade problematic film."

S. Srivatsan of The Hindu wrote "The third installment of this script still has no proper justification for the lead character's aggressiveness, despite a decent showing from Dhruv Vikram in his Tamil debut." Baradwaj Rangan wrote for Film Companion, "Like Arjun Reddy, this is a beautifully made film. The director allows it to breathe. Ravi K Chandran doesn't romanticise the already Romantic story. Except in a few shots, his palette is neutral, natural.., the editor Vivek Harshan cuts many scenes a few frames earlier than you'd expect the “finish” (the segues are amazingly dynamic)...I don't recall the editing pattern of Arjun Reddy, but these rhythms feel refreshingly new for Tamil cinema".

== Accolades ==
Year	Award	Category	Nominee	Result	Ref.
2020	13th Ananda Vikatan Cinema Awards	Best Debut – Male	Dhruv Vikram	Won	
2020	Zee Cine Awards Tamil	Best Debut Actor (Male)	Dhruv Vikram	Won	
