= Megha Chowdhury =

Indian actress

- Megha Chowdhury
- Born: 7 February 1997 (age 29); Kolkata, West Bengal, India
- Education: Amity University, Noida (BA)
- Occupations: Actress; television presenter; model; dancer
- Years active: 2012–present
- Known for: Amar Prem; Varmaa; Marshal; Mission Everest; Tenant; Made in Kolkata

Megha Chowdhury (born 7 February 1997) is an Indian actress, television presenter, model, and trained dancer who works predominantly in Bengali, Telugu, and Tamil cinema. Beginning on stage at age four and later entering broadcasting at fifteen as a video jockey (VJ) on Sangeet Bangla, Megha gained early behind-the-scenes experience in Mumbai as a casting assistant and assistant director before making her mainstream screen acting debut in the Bengali romantic drama Amar Prem (2016).

Over her career, Megha has maintained a strong artistic presence in Bengali cinema alongside major ventures across South Indian industries. While she earned pan-regional recognition starring in Bala's Tamil romance Varmaa (2020) and headlined notable Telugu projects including the investigative thriller Marshal (2019), Oorantha Anukuntunnaru (2019), and the acclaimed suspense mystery Tenant (2024), she returned to Bengali cinema in 2022 with the Himalayan expedition drama Mission Everest. Megha later starred in the Bengali digital romantic comedy series Khanikta Premer Moto (2026), and her upcoming slate features high-profile Bengali auteur productions including Mainak Bhaumik's ensemble drama Made in Kolkata, Tathagata Mukherjee's experimental one-take feature Gopone Modh Charan, and Biswajit Das's Sankhobelai, alongside the Telugu family entertainer Kothikommachi, helmed by National Award-winning director Satish Vegesna.

== Acting career ==
=== Tamil breakthrough with Varmaa (2018–2020) ===
In mid-2018, National Film Award-winning director Bala cast Megha as the female protagonist opposite Dhruv Vikram in Varmaa, the official Tamil adaptation of the Telugu blockbuster Arjun Reddy (2017).

Megha portrayed Megha, an understated medical student navigating an intense, turbulent romance that drives the central narrative. Filming took place across Chennai, Varkala, and Kathmandu. Following post-production developments, Bala's original cut of the film was officially released on over-the-top (OTT) streaming platforms worldwide in October 2020, bringing Megha significant exposure across South Indian entertainment media.

=== Telugu cinema, thriller roles, and acclaim (2019–2024) ===
Her industry visibility from Varmaa facilitated her entry into Telugu cinema. In September 2019, Megha made her Tollywood debut in Jai Raja Singh's medical-action thriller Marshal, co-starring Srikanth and Abhay Adaka. Rather than taking on a conventional romantic role, Megha played an assertive television news journalist investigating corporate clinical malpractice, learning conversational Telugu to deliver her dialogue with natural inflection.

In 2024, Megha received widespread critical praise for her central performance in the suspense drama Tenant, directed by Y. Yugandhar and co-starring Satyam Rajesh. Playing Sandhya, an educated homemaker whose sudden death inside a high-rise gated community sparks a homicide investigation, critics noted that Megha gave the film its poignant emotional anchor, subtly portraying the vulnerabilities and isolation of urban middle-class marriage.

=== Return to Bengali cinema and streaming projects (2022–present) ===
In early 2026, Megha expanded into digital streaming platforms by headlining the Bengali romantic comedy web series Khanikta Premer Moto on Platform 8, playing opposite Rahul Dev Bose. Her portrayal of Ahana, a contemporary Kolkata woman dealing with modern relationships, dating dilemmas, and situationships, was warmly received by critics for its relatable humor and dynamic on-screen chemistry.

=== Upcoming projects ===
- Made in Kolkata: An ensemble urban drama written and directed by celebrated filmmaker Mainak Bhaumik, exploring the aspirations, interpersonal relationships, and professional lives of young adults in contemporary Kolkata, featuring Megha alongside Soumya Mukherjee, Angana Roy, Aishwarya Sen, and Saptarshi Maulik.
- Gopone Modh Charan: Directed by Tathagata Mukherjee, this experimental thriller marks an industry milestone as the first continuous single-shot (one-take) Bengali feature film, filmed uninterrupted in Kolkata between 2:00 AM and 4:15 AM, starring Megha alongside Rishav Basu, Soumya Mukherjee, Soham Majumdar, and Rooqma Ray.
- Kothikommachi: A Telugu youthful family entertainer directed by National Film Award winner Satish Vegesna, produced by M. L. V. Sathyanarayana under Lakshya Productions, where Megha plays one of the central female leads opposite Meghamsh Srihari, Sameer Vegesna, and Riddhi Kumar, with veteran actors Rajendra Prasad and Naresh in supporting roles.

== Filmography ==
Year	Title	Role	Language	Notes
2016	Amar Prem	Megha	Bengali	Feature film debut; produced by Eros International
2019	Marshal	Megha	Telugu	Telugu cinema debut
2019	Oorantha Anukuntunnaru	Gouri	Telugu	
2020	Varmaa	Megha	Tamil	Tamil cinema debut; released on Simply South
2022	Mission Everest	Paromita	Bengali	Return to Bengali cinema; based on true Everest summit expedition
2023	Phalana Abbayi Phalana Ammayi	Pooja	Telugu	
2024	Tenant	Sandhya	Telugu	
2025	Jigel	Radha	Telugu	
TBA	Made in Kolkata	TBA	Bengali	Directed by Mainak Bhaumik; post-production
TBA	Gopone Modh Charan	TBA	Bengali	Directed by Tathagata Mukherjee; single-shot feature
TBA	Kothikommachi	TBA	Telugu	Directed by Satish Vegesna; post-production
TBA	Sankhobelai	TBA	Bengali	Post-production

== Television, web series & music videos ==
Year	Title	Format	Role	Network / Platform
2012–2014	Various Music Shows & Live Countdowns	Television	Video Jockey (VJ) / Presenter	Sangeet Bangla
2021	"Tum Aaye"	Music Video	Lead model (with Aryann Bhowmik)	Skillify Music
2026	Khanikta Premer Moto	Web Series	Ahana (lead)	Platform 8

== Production credits ==
Year	Title	Language	Department	Director
2016	M.S. Dhoni: The Untold Story	Hindi	Casting assistant	Neeraj Pandey
2017	Haseena Parkar	Hindi	Assistant director	Apoorva Lakhia
