= Raj Thota =

Indian cinematographer

- Born: Thota Raju; Suryapet, Andhra Pradesh (present-day Telangana), India
- Other name: Raj
- Occupation: Cinematographer
- Spouse: Jayanthi Thota

Raj Thota is an Indian cinematographer who works in Telugu cinema. He received praise for the film Arjun Reddy.

== Early life ==
Raj was born in the Kasarabad village, grew up in Suryapet, Nalgonda, Telangana, and moved to Hyderabad. He was very enthusiastic in building teams to play village-level cricket and kabaddi, from a very young age. His mother, Mani Thota, is a house wife, while his father, the late Venkat Thota, was a makeup artist for Telugu films, mainly doing make-up for Mohan Babu. He showed keen interest in photography since an early age.

== Career ==
He worked under DOP Mohana Krishna, as an assistant, in Hindi films, such as Ishqiya, R... Rajkumar, Do Lafzon Ki Kahani, and Force 2. He also worked in several commercials, as a second unit cameraman.

== Filmography ==
Year	Film	Notes
2017	Arjun Reddy	
2018	Needi Naadi Oke Katha	
2018	Husharu	
2019	iSmart Shankar	
2019	Hulchul	
2020	Entha Manchivaadavuraa	
2021	Mahasamudram	
2022	Alluri	
2022	Sivudu	Only dubbed version released
2024	Ooru Peru Bhairavakona	
2024	Om Bheem Bush	
2025	Dear Uma	
2027	Spirit †	
