= Pisaasu =

2014 Indian film by Mysskin

- Theatrical release poster
- Directed by: Mysskin
- Written by: Mysskin
- Produced by: Bala
- Starring: Naga; Prayaga Martin
- Cinematography: Ravee Roy
- Edited by: Gopinath
- Music by: Arrol Corelli
- Production company: B Studios
- Distributed by: Sri Thenandal Films
- Release date: 19 December 2014
- Running time: 114 minutes
- Country: India
- Language: Tamil

Pisaasu (lit. 'Pishacha'; transl. Demon) is a 2014 Indian Tamil-language supernatural horror film written and directed by Mysskin and produced by Bala under B Studios. The film stars Naga and Prayaga Martin alongside Radha Ravi, Rajkumar Pitchumani, Ashvatt, Kalyani Natarajan, and Harish Uthaman. It was released on 19 December 2014 and became a box office success. The film was remade in Kannada as Rakshasi (2015) and in Hindi as Nanu Ki Jaanu (2018). A sequel Pisasu 2, also directed by Mysskin, was produced but remains unreleased.

== Plot ==
Siddharth Soundaarajan is an upcoming violinist in Chennai, who stumbles upon an accident where a girl is lying in a pool of blood. He rushes her to the hospital with the help of an auto rickshaw driver Adaikalam and a couple. However, he is too late, and the girl passes away holding his hand. Traumatized by the whole episode, Siddharth comes home with one of her slippers. He then drives around the city aimlessly with his red car while helping homeless people, unable to come out of the depression due to the girl's death.

After the incident, strange things start happening at Siddharth's apartment. He begins to feel a supernatural presence at his house. The house is cleaned up even if he makes it messy and his bottle opener goes missing whenever he tries to drink beer. With the help of his friend Badri, he employs a psychic to exorcise the ghost, but she turns out to be a fraud and is scared out of the apartment by a strange apparition. Siddharth also comes to realise that his next-door neighbour's autistic son plays with an imaginary friend. When Siddharth's mother Janaki comes to visit him, she is hit by a drunk neighbour, who is abusing his wife. The neighbour is then attacked by a mysterious ghost. The following day, Janaki meets with a freak accident in the bathroom and is saved by the ghost who alerts the neighbours. However, Siddharth mistakes that the ghost had attacked his mother and threatens the ghost that he would kill himself and come as a ghost to take revenge on her. All the many rituals of various religions Siddharth performs to drive the ghost away are proven futile, and the ghost continues to stay. Also, a petty thief is stabbed while trying to steal from Siddharth's apartment.

Siddharth is assured that the ghost of the girl whose life he tried to save is behind all these strange occurrences and goes in search of her family to see if they can help get rid of her. He finds that girl's name is Bhavani and her father runs a local ice factory. Siddharth confronts the father and asks him to cremate his daughter to save him from her ghost. Siddharth brings the father to his apartment to show him the ghost, when his mother calls from the hospital to tell him that it was actually the ghost who has saved her life. Bhavani's father then tries to see if the ghost is actually trying to protect Siddharth. When the ghost appears as expected, her father begs her to come home with him, but she remains at the apartment. Siddharth understands that Bhavani's spirit never meant him any harm.

Realizing that the only way Bhavani can rest in peace is by bringing her killer to face justice, Siddharth and his friends attempt to solve the mystery of her death themselves. They track down Adaikalam, who tells them that he saw a green car driving away after the accident. They then manage to track down the green car at a shady workshop. Adaikalam is revealed to have stolen an orphaned child from the hospital since he and his wife cannot have children of their own. Adaikalam's cousin, who was in the car that day, tells Siddharth that she saw the actual car that hit Bhavani that day and that it was not green but red, much like Siddharth's own car. Siddharth then goes back to Adaikalam and asks him to differentiate between red and green apples, which he cannot since he is colorblind.

Finally realising that he himself is the killer, Siddharth goes to tell Bhavani's father the truth. The ghost tries to stop him, but he still does so. Over-ridden with guilt, Siddharth tries to commit suicide. Bhavani's spirit saves him by cremating her own body that her father had preserved all this time in the ice, thus moving on to the next world. Bhavani's father comforts Siddharth by saying that he is a very kindhearted person, he would have never done that intentionally, and that is why his daughter fell in love with him and stayed with him.

== Cast ==
- Naga as Siddharth Soundarrajan
- Prayaga Martin as Bhavani/Ghost
- Radha Ravi as Bhavani's father
- Rajkumar Pitchumani as Yugi
- Ashvatt as Badri
- Kalyani Natarajan as Janaki Soundarrajan
- Harish Uthaman as Angry husband
- Kani Kusruti as Angry husband's wife
- Vinodhini Vaidyanathan as Mahesh's mother
- A. Dinesh Kumar as Mahesh's father
- Nimmy Raphael as Aavi Amala
- Siddhanth as Plato
- Samarth as Mahesh
- Amudhan as Sampath
- Supergood Subramani as Adaikalam (Auto Driver)
- Mohan Natarajan as Inspector
- Regan Rajendran as himself
- Vincent Arul as Mechanic

== Production ==
After receiving positive reviews for Onaayum Aattukkuttiyum (2013), Mysskin was signed up by director Bala to make a film under his production house, B Studios. Mysskin subsequently left for the US to research and write the script for the horror film, before a launch ceremony for the venture was held in Chennai in May 2014 at midnight, contrary to typical morning time launches. Newcomers Naga and Prayaga Martin were cast in the principal roles, with the latter being selected to play a ghost after a successful audition. Naga had been selected by Bala, whom he had associated with as an assistant director for the director's project Tharai Thappattai (2015). Harish Uthaman was signed up to play a pivotal role and shot for his portions in June 2014. The team shot action scenes with Hong Kong stuntman Tony Leung Siu Hung, who collaborated with Mysskin after Mugamoodi (2012), while Ravi Roy, Jayashree Lakshminarayanan and newcomer Arrol Corelli joined the team as cinematographer, art director and music composer respectively. Malayalam actress Kani Kusruti, who had earlier featured in the film Burma, was also cast for a supporting role. The film was in post-production as of October 2014.

== Music ==
The soundtrack and score were composed by debutant Arrol Corelli, in his debut. "Pogum Paadhai", sung by Uthara Unnikrishnan and written by Thamizhachi Thangapandian is the only song in the 22-track album; the others are instrumentals.

Track listing
No.	Title	Lyrics	Singer(s)	Length
1.	"Pogum Paadhai"	Thamizhachi Thangapandian	Uthara Unnikrishnan	3:59

== Release ==
Pisaasu was released on 19 December 2014. In Tamil Nadu, it was distributed by Sri Thenandal Films.

=== Critical reception ===
Writing for The Hindu, Baradwaj Rangan called Pisaasu a "terrific addition to one of the most exciting oeuvres in Tamil cinema", adding, "With most of our movies, we sense pages from the script being transposed to screen -- there's so little that can be called cinema. Mysskin's cinema is all cinema, and it appears to rise from some place deep within him, some place even he may not be aware of. And he's at a point now where he can execute the must-haves of commercial cinema in increasingly inventive ways...The filmmaking is more than clean. It's...pure". S. Saraswathi of Rediff.com gave the film 3.5 stars out of 5 and wrote, "Deliberately paced, with stunning music and an intriguing plot, Pisaasu is a typical, thought-provoking Mysskin film that deserves much applause. The taut screenplay, simple dialogues, excellent characterisation and admirable performances coupled with perfect execution, make Mysskin's Pisaasu a must watch".

Sify called it a "very satisfying horror movie. The film works to a large extent because there is a level of acting here that's rarely seen in films in this genre. Simple filmmaking techniques like camera angles, keen concepts and fantastic sequencing to create a truly terrifying horror experience that is mostly free of blood and gore, makes it an edge-of-the-seat thriller". Sinndhuja Ramprasad of Silverscreen.in wrote, "The director's fascination for everything morbid is what drives the script. He's one of those artistes that paints penury in flattering colours, glorifies everything that is bare and poor, and gets lyrical with the dark and the dismal. Pisaasu is elementally Mysskin that way. It is dotted with the specially-abled, set against a grim canvas".

Anupama Subramanian of Deccan Chronicle gave 2.5 stars and wrote, "It may not scare you to death, but has interesting elements in it to keep you entertained. It is a different conceptualization of ghost and can be watched once for its novel experience". M. Suganth of The Times of India gave the film 3 stars out of 5 and wrote, "the film, the second half to be specific, suffers from the same problem as Naga's Anandhapurathu Veedu. Once we realize the attitude of the ghost towards the protagonist, it takes away quite a bit of the tension. We know he will remain unharmed and so, there is nothing to dread anymore, and horror films need an element of fear to keep the viewer on the edge of the seat. But, the climax compensates for this..."

=== Box office ===
Pisaasu released in 212 screens throughout Tamil Nadu and grossed ₹11.8 million on its first day, which was the best opening for a Mysskin film. Its opening weekend gross was estimated at ₹ 28.6 million. According to Sify, Pisaasu was one of the most profitable Tamil films of the year.

== Sequel ==
In 2020, a sequel titled Pisasu 2 was announced by Mysskin, produced by Rockfort Entertainment and starring Andrea Jeremiah and Rajkumar Pitchumani. Though filming began in December 2020 and was completed in September 2021, the film remains unreleased due to legal and financial issues. In October 2026, Mysskin expressed sadness over the film's delay and was unsure if it would ever release.
