= Varmaa =

2020 film directed by Bala

- Official release poster
- Directed by: Bala
- Based on: Arjun Reddy by Sandeep Reddy Vanga
- Produced by: Mukesh R. Mehta
- Starring: Dhruv Vikram; Megha Chowdhury
- Cinematography: M. Sukumar
- Edited by: Sathish Suriya
- Music by: Radhan
- Production company: E4 Entertainment
- Distributed by: The Ally; Shreyas ET; ShemarooMe; Simply South; Tentkotta
- Release date: 6 October 2020
- Running time: 120 minutes
- Country: India
- Language: Tamil

Varmaa is a 2020 Indian Tamil-language romantic drama film directed by Bala and produced by Mukesh Mehta of E4 Entertainment. A remake of the 2017 Telugu film Arjun Reddy, directed by Sandeep Reddy Vanga, the film stars Dhruv Vikram and Megha Chowdhury, the latter in her Tamil debut. The film features music composed by Radhan, with M. Sukumar handling the cinematography and Sathish Suriya, taking in-charge of the editing.

Filmed between March and September 2018, its release was initially cancelled after E4 Entertainment was unsatisfied with the output and re-shot the remake in 2019 as Adithya Varma with a largely different cast and crew. Despite E4's initial refusal to release Varmaa, the film was released on 6 October 2020 on over-the-top (OTT) platforms to negative reviews from critics.

== Plot ==
Varmaa Vasudevan is a rich medical student. Despite being a brilliant student, he has severe anger management problems that earn the wrath of the college dean. Varmaa's aggressive nature also earns him a reputation among his juniors as a college bully. After a brawl alongside his friend Kamal against members of the opposing team during an inter-college football match, the dean asks Varmaa to either apologise or leave the college. Varmaa initially chooses to leave the college but stays back after meeting the first-year Malayali student Megha.

Varmaa and his friend Ashok enter a 1st-year classroom and announce that Varmaa is in love with Megha and asserts that she is exclusive to him. Initially afraid, Megha starts adjusting to Varmaa's overbearing attitude. She eventually reciprocates his feelings and they develop an intimate relationship. Varmaa graduates with an MBBS degree and leaves to pursue a master's degree in orthopaedic surgery. Over the course of 15 days, Varmaa's and Megha's relationship becomes stronger. Days later, Varmaa visits Megha's house, where her father sees them kissing and throws Varmaa out.

Megha's father opposes her and Varmaa's relationship due to Varmaa's brash behaviour and also because they belong to different castes. Varmaa demands Megha decide within six hours otherwise he will end their relationship. Following this incident, Megha's parents seize her phone, preventing her from contacting Varma. By the time she manages to visit Varmaa's house, he is drunk, injects morphine into himself, and becomes unconscious for two days. Megha is then forcibly married to someone from her caste. Varmaa learns about the marriage from Ashok and goes to her house. He is assaulted and gets arrested for making a scene. Varmaa's father throws him out of the family home for ruining his reputation.

With Ashok's help, Varmaa rents a flat and joins a private hospital as a surgeon. To cope with his emotions, he starts taking drugs, attempts one-night stands, buys a pet dog, and names it after Megha and drinks alcohol; all of which are unsuccessful. Within months, he becomes a successful surgeon and a high-functioning alcoholic who is feared by the hospital's staff members, one of the reasons being his high surgery count. Varmaa's self-destructing behaviour and refusal to move on worries Ashok. He persuades one of his patients, Raiza Wilson, a leading film star, to have a no-strings relationship with him, which he ends when she falls in love with him.

On a day off, Varmaa unwillingly agrees to perform life-saving surgery and collapses from dehydration. The hospital staff examines his blood samples, which show traces of alcohol and cocaine. The hospital chief files a case against Varma, who accepts the truth on the grounds of violating his professional ethics during an in-house court hearing, despite Ashok making arrangements to bail him out. Varmaa's medical licence is cancelled for five years and he is evicted from the flat. The next morning, Ashok manages to reach Varmaa to convey his father's death; he and they reconcile. Varmaa gives up his self-destructive habits soon after.

While leaving for a vacation, Varmaa sees a pregnant Megha sitting in a park. Convinced that she is unhappy with her marriage, Varmaa meets her after returning from his vacation. Megha reveals that she left her husband days after their marriage and continued to work in a clinic. She tells Varmaa that he is the child's father, and they reunite.

== Cast ==
- Dhruv Vikram as Varmaa Vasudevan
- Megha Chowdhury as Megha Hariharan
- Easwari Rao as Bhavani
- Raiza Wilson as Herself
- Jai Bala as Prem Vasudevan
- Mathew Varghese as Varmaa's father
- Akash Premkumar as Ashok
- Priyadarshini Rajkumar as Varmaa's mother
- Sandra Amy as Devi
- Gomathi Priya as Deepa
- Brigida Saga as Anu (uncredited)

== Production ==
=== Development ===
In September 2017, it was announced that E4 Entertainment had bought the rights to remake the Telugu film Arjun Reddy (2017) in Tamil and Malayalam languages. The following month, Bala was chosen to direct the yet-untitled Tamil remake. On 10 November 2017, the title was announced as Varma, although it would later be amended to Varmaa. Raju Murugan was chosen to pen the dialogues. M. Sukumar was selected to handle the cinematography and Sathish Suriya was chosen as the film editor, after having earlier worked for Bala's Naachiyaar (2018). Producer Mukesh Mehta said the remake would be 20 minutes shorter than the Telugu original. Actor Vikram's son Dhruv Vikram was cast as the male lead, in what would have been his acting debut. It would have been the debut for the Kolkata-based model Megha Chowdhury, who was chosen to play the female lead. Sandra Amy, then on a hiatus from one of her television serials, was contacted by Bala's office about acting in the film and accepted as "I would have to be out of mind to not have taken up an offer by Bala sir". She was cast after a successful audition.

=== Filming ===
Principal photography began in early March 2018 at Kathmandu, Nepal, and a week later, after completing the first schedule there, the crew shifted to Chennai for the second schedule. Filming was briefly stalled due to the Tamil Film Producers Council strike, but resumed in April after the strike ended. The final filming schedule took place in August 2018, for which the team had shifted to Tiruvannamalai. Principal photography wrapped in September 2018.

=== Shelving ===
On 7 February 2019, E4 issued a press statement stating that they would go for a complete reshoot as they were not satisfied with the final cut provided by Bala. Bala's version of the film contained deviations from Arjun Reddy, which resulted in the conflict. Changes included the absence of many characters from Arjun Reddy, including the male lead's grandmother. Varmaa was also two hours long while the original was three. In their press statement, E4 added that the film would be relaunched with a completely new cast and crew while retaining Dhruv.

In a separate press statement, Bala decried E4's comments, saying it was his own decision to quit the film "in order to safeguard creative freedom" because he was asked to make changes. He shared an agreement signed with E4, revealing he had been granted complete creative control but was not willing to make changes, and if they were adamant, they could proceed as long as he was completely removed from the project. This was considered an unprecedented move in Tamil cinema. The new version, directed by Gireesaaya, was titled Adithya Varma, and did not retain any scene shot by Bala for Varmaa.

== Soundtrack ==
Varmaa

Soundtrack album by Radhan
- Released: 2020
- Recorded: 2018
- Genre: Feature film soundtrack
- Language: Tamil
- Label: H1 Creation
- Producer: Radhan

Radhan chronology
Amaram Akhilam Prema (2020)	Varmaa (2020)	Biskoth (2020)

Singles from Varmaa
- 1. "Vaanodum Mannodum" Released: 27 December 2018

The soundtrack for the film was composed by Radhan who signed the project in July 2018. The song "Vaanodum Mannodum", written by Vairamuthu and sung by Vignesh G., was released on 27 December 2018 as a single.

Track listing
No.	Title	Lyrics	Singer(s)	Length
1.	"Sumanasa Vanditha"	—	Saindhavi	02:37
2.	"Enthan Kannile"	Mohan Rajan	Ranjith Govind	04:09
3.	"Mazhai Illai Megham Illai"	Mohan Rajan	Priyanka NK	03:26
4.	"Ratham Sottum"	Vairamuthu	Arun Krishnan	—
5.	"Aazhiyin Nadhiye"	Mohan Rajan	Ramya NSK	—
6.	"Poguthe Kaalame"	Mohan Rajan	Jithan	01:30
7.	"Vaanodum Mannodum"	Vairamuthu	Vignesh G.	03:40
8.	"Mudhal Nodi"	—	—	02:37
9.	"Adai Mazhai Thuli"	—	—	03:16

== Marketing ==
The teaser for Varmaa was released on 23 September 2018. It was widely ridiculed and criticised on social media, while a critic from The New Indian Express called it "a failed attempt to remake the original". The teaser received five million views within fifty hours of release. The trailer was released on 9 January 2019.

== Release ==
When Varmaa was scheduled for a theatrical release in January 2019, Shakthi Film Factory acquired the Tamil Nadu distribution rights. Despite E4's initial refusal to release it, Mehta said in March 2020 that the release was still possible. The film was eventually released on 6 October 2020 on over-the-top (OTT) platforms. It was released on Simply South and Tentkotta internationally, and within India on The Ally, Shreyas ET and ShemarooMe.

== Critical reception ==
Varmaa received generally negative reviews from critics, many of whom compared it unfavourably to Adithya Varma.

M. Suganth of The Times of India rated the film 2 stars out of 5, saying, "Instead of feeling new age-y, Varmaa comes across as old-fashioned and even crass at times. It gets Arjun Reddy all wrong." Suganth also felt many of the actors like Chowdhury were miscast and criticised the lack of onscreen chemistry between her and Dhruv. He concluded that Dhruv looks "sure-footed in some scenes and like a novice in some". Baradwaj Rangan of Film Companion wrote, "Not a single frame is distinctive, or shows that a major filmmaker is behind the camera. You get the feeling Bala was forced to direct this with his hands tied." Ranjani Krishnakumar of Firstpost wrote, "Varmaa is not rooted anywhere. The milieu does nothing for the film. Varma’s pain, which is what made Arjun Reddy intense, is heavily diluted. In fact, for the most part, he is just your average alcoholic, only too pampered."

Manoj Kumar R of The Indian Express wrote, "After watching Varmaa, I could see why the producer thought it was not a good idea to release it in theaters. Bala's interpretation of Sandeep Vanga's material strips the larger-than-life aura around the self-indulgent, inconsiderate, alcoholic and self-destructive protagonist." However, he concluded that the film "is a unique, honest and bold interpretation of a character that we all love despite the breathtaking level of faultiness." Srivatsan S. of The Hindu wrote that "the Bala Cut, as it would come to be known, is surprisingly cold and lifeless — even by the standards set by Adithya Varma — and edits out the dramatic bits of the Telugu original, only limiting to its plot points" and felt that the film was a "reinterpretation" of the director's 1999 film Sethu. Sudhir Srinivasan of Cinema Express gave the film a rating of one-and-a-half out of five stars and noted that "What would the Bala of today change about/add to this story that’s been told so many times now that you can predict its every beat? Well, it turns out that he hasn’t. He has settled to giving us a jaded, curtailed version instead".
