= Marshal (film) =

2019 Indian Telugu-language film

- Theatrical release poster
- Directed by: Jai Raaja Singh
- Produced by: Abhay Adaka
- Starring: Srikanth; Abhay Adaka; Megha Chowdhury
- Cinematography: R. M. Swamy
- Edited by: C. P. Jambulingam; G. Kalyanasundaram
- Music by: Songs: Varikuppala Yadagiri; Score: Ravi Basrur
- Production company: AVL Productions
- Release date: 13 September 2019
- Country: India
- Language: Telugu

Marshal is a 2019 Indian Telugu-language medical thriller film directed by Jai Raaja Singh. The film stars Srikanth, Abhay Adaka, and Megha Chowdhury. The music was composed by Varikuppala Yadagiri and Ravi Basrur, and the film released on 13 September 2019.

== Plot ==
Abhi, a medical salesman, is a big fan of "Super Star" Sivaji, to the chagrin of his family, friends, and coworkers. Despite his efforts, he is unable to take a selfie with his favorite film actor. Meanwhile, Megha, a journalist, exposes a hospital that is severely underpaying and mistreating surrogate mothers and charging high prices to couples who wish to have children through surrogacy. In addition, there are some criminals kidnapping women for mysterious medical experiments ending in failure and death.

One day, Abhi is promoted and becomes an area manager, and is charged with distributing beauty pills to the contestants of a beauty pageant. On his way, he and the original gang notice another set of kidnappers abducting Megha. Despite help from his father, a police officer, the culprits escape. At the pageant, Abhi notices the men who kidnapped Megha and is then shocked to see the "victim" herself. She reveals that it was simply a prank, and Abhi scolds her for her irresponsibility. She starts to fall for him, and after she stays with his family for a while, he also confesses his love.

Abhi's sister, who has been struggling with infertility, goes to a hospital for fertility treatments but also goes through the same experiment and enters a coma. After an argument with a careless doctor, Abhi is arrested, and it is revealed that the women who consumed the pills experienced stomachaches and lost consciousness. To clear his name, Abhi and his father investigate the source of the pills, and learn that the number on the back is linked to the hospital. When they investigate, they find out that all the women were forced to become test subjects of a procedure to reverse infertility, which has finally succeeded for the first time, and the doctor responsible is none other than Sivaji.

Abhi, his father, his brother-in-law (who is an ethical hacker), and Megha join forces to stop this conspiracy. Through further investigation, they bug the hospital and find out that Sivaji is organizing the kidnappings in order to make "designer babies". They interrogate the head doctor, who reveals that Sivaji has always been an intelligent but cold man ruthlessly pursuing what he sees as "advances" in science. After hearing that a certain type of sterility where eggs are not released is incurable, he started "Project Marshal", but his ideas were continually rejected. Only recently had he been able to start clinical trials in order to prove his idea to medical officials in Japan. As the country has been facing a demographic crisis due to infertility caused by the atomic bombings of Hiroshima and Nagasaki and the Fukushima Daiichi nuclear disaster, Japanese officials were interested in his ideas, and wanted proof before they could implement it.

Sivaji flees to Japan, but Megha broadcasts a video recording from their secret camera, and the officials tell him he must clear up everything in order to get his procedure accepted. Despite the evidence, Sivaji gets off scot-free by claiming it was for a TV show, and takes a mocking selfie with Abhi. Sivaji's fans protest the case and start causing trouble across the city and to Abhi. Later on, Sivaji's mother tells him that he was born to a surrogate mother, and that his personality is due to her influence.

The next day, Sivaji calls Abhi and taunts him, saying that a car with a famous athlete inside will be attacked and that he must save it. Abhi finds Sivaji's fan club and gets them to help by claiming that Sivaji is in the car, barely managing to stop the attackers. To his shock, Sivaji exits the car instead. After he comes back, a man suddenly shoots him and gets away. As he dies, Sivaji reveals that he donated the method to the government to atone for his misdeeds. The other members of "F-Club", who wanted to profit, decided to kill him. The film ends with Abhi's sister giving birth and Sivaji being revered for his medical advances.

== Cast ==
- Srikanth as Sivaji
- Abhay Adaka as Abhi
- Megha Chowdhury as Megha
- Reshmi Singh
- Suman as Sivaji's father
- Priyadarshini Ram as Abhi's father
- Pragathi as Abhi's mother
- Babloo Prithiveeraj as G. M. Ravindar Reddy
- Ravi Prakash as Abhi's brother-in-law
- Sharanya Pradeep as Suma
- Sudharshan as Abhi's friend
- Muralidhar Goud
- Kalpa Latha as Abhi's mother

== Critical reception ==
The Hindu wrote that "Every frame looks lavish and the music and background score are good, but one wishes a little more care in execution to give the story more credibility". The Times of India gave the film a rating of two out of five stars and noted that "To its credit, Marshal is definitely not regular commercial fare. But with weak scripting and acting, it’s only Srikanth’s grace that saves this film".
