= Tenant (film) =

2024 Indian Telugu-language thriller film

- Theatrical release poster
- Directed by: Y. Yugandhar
- Screenplay by: Y. Yugandhar
- Story by: YS Srinivasa Varma
- Produced by: Mogulla Chandrashekhar Reddy
- Starring: Satyam Rajesh; Megha Chowdhury
- Cinematography: Jemin Jom Ayyaneth
- Edited by: Vijay Mukthavarapu
- Music by: Sahityya Sagar
- Production company: Mahateja Creations
- Release date: 19 April 2024
- Running time: 96 minutes
- Country: India
- Language: Telugu

Tenant is a 2024 Indian Telugu-language thriller film directed by Y. Yugandhar. Produced by Mahateja Creations, the film stars Satyam Rajesh and Megha Chowdhury in lead roles. It was theatrically released on 19 April 2024.

== Cast ==
- Satyam Rajesh as Goutham
- Megha Chowdhury as Sandhya
- Chandana Payaavula as Sravani
- Bharathkanth as Rishi
- Tejadilip as Rohin
- Aadukalam Naren as Raghava Rao, Sravani's father
- Ester Noronha as Investigation Officer Esther
- Dhana Bala
- Anuraag Binnu
- Chandu
- Ramya Ponduri
- Meghna

== Production ==
The film was officially announced in November 2023. The trailer launch event was held on 13 April 2024.

== Music ==
The film's soundtrack album and background score were composed by Sahityya Sagar

All lyrics are written by Sahityya Sagar; all music is composed by Sahityya Sagar.

Track list
No.	Title	Singer(s)	Length
1.	"Naa Kadhalo" (Children vocals : Tanishka Balaraju, Veda Vagdevi, Ujwal Sridatta)	Surendranath N J, Jaya Sri Pallem	4:11
2.	"E Kshanam"	Shaik Sabiha	2:50

== Reception ==
News18 in its review wrote that "Despite the drawbacks, Tenant is a film worth watching for its performances and its deft handling of a socially relevant topic". Times Now gave a rating of 2.5 out of 5 and praised the screenplay and performances of Satyam Rajesh, Megha Chowdhury and Esther.
