= Oorantha Anukuntunnaru =

- Film poster
- Directed by: Balaji Sanala
- Written by: Ramya Gogula; Srihari Mangalampalli; Balaji Sanala
- Produced by: Srihari Mangalampalli; Ramya Gogula; PLN Reddy
- Starring: Nawin Vijay Krishna; Srinivas Avasarala; Megha Chowdhury; Sophia Singh
- Cinematography: G. L. Babu
- Edited by: Madhu
- Music by: K. M. Radha Krishnan
- Production company: Rowaskair Entertainments
- Release date: 5 October 2019
- Running time: 144 minutes
- Country: India
- Language: Telugu

Oorantha Anukuntunnaru (transl. The whole village is talking about it) is a 2019 Indian Telugu-language romantic drama film directed by Balaji Sanala and starring Nawin Vijay Krishna, Srinivas Avasarala, Megha Chowdhury, and Sophia Singh.

== Cast ==
- Nawin Vijay Krishna as Mahesh
- Srinivas Avasarala as Shiva Raman Iyer
- Megha Chowdhury as Gowri
- Sophia Singh as Maya
- Jayasudha as Leelavathi
- Rao Ramesh as Shivanaidu
- Kota Srinivasa Rao as Oori Pedda
- Ashok Kumar as Iyer's father
- Raja Ravindra as Police Inspector
- Gautham Raju

== Production ==
Nawin Vijay Krishna, who was last seen in Nandini Nursing Home (2016), plays one of the leads in the film. In addition to starring in the film, he has also worked as the trailer editor for the film. The other leads were played by Srinivas Avasarala, Megha Chowdhury, and newcomer Sophia Singh. The narrative of the film follows two parallel love stories. Filming began on 22 January 2018. The film was shot at Palakollu and Lakshmi Parvathi's house. Jayasudha and Rao Ramesh were cast in pivotal roles.

== Soundtrack ==
The songs were composed by K. M. Radha Krishnan. Raashii Khanna sang the reprise version of "Kanna" in the film.

No.	Title	Lyrics	Singer(s)	Length
1.	"Kanna"	Vanamali	K. M. Radha Krishnan, K. S. Chithra	4:45
2.	"Alavaatu Lo Leni"	Srihari Mangalampalli	S. P. Balasubrahmanyam, Sunitha Upadrashta	3:36
3.	"Nee Romba Romba"	Srihari Mangalampalli	Manisha Eerabathini	2:51
4.	"Marriages Are Made In Heaven"	Peddada Murthy	Pavan, Vaishnavi	3:21
5.	"Aatanu Aaduthunnadhevaro"	Srihari Mangalampalli	S. P. Balasubrahmanyam	3:49
6.	"Kanna (Reprise)"	Vanamali	Raashii Khanna, Anurag Kulkarni	3:20
Total length:				21:42

== Release ==
The film was originally scheduled to release in May, but was postponed to 5 October, around the time of Dussehra.
