= Chandi Veeran =

2015 Indian film by A. Sarkunam

- Directed by: A. Sarkunam
- Produced by: Bala
- Starring: Atharvaa; Anandhi
- Cinematography: P. G. Muthiah
- Music by: S. N. Arunagiri (songs); Sabesh–Murali (score)
- Production company: B Studios
- Distributed by: Sri Green Productions
- Release date: 7 August 2015
- Running time: 115 minutes
- Country: India
- Language: Tamil

Chandi Veeran (transl. Chandi warrior) is a 2015 Indian Tamil-language romantic action film directed by A. Sarkunam and produced by director Bala. The film stars Atharvaa and Anandhi, while Lal, Rajashree, and Bose Venkat essay supporting roles. The music was composed by S. N. Arunagiri with the score composed by Sabesh–Murali. The film was released on 7 August 2015.

== Plot ==
As a child, Paari lost his father, who tried to stop the war between his native and neighboring village as they fought over sharing a pond water. Years later, Paari is a young man who returns from Singapore, but the battle between the two villages is still on. Meanwhile, Paari is in love with Thamarai, the daughter of a rich village man, who also owns the pond and is adamant not to supply water to the nearby village. Paari tries many ways to impress Thamarai but all end in vain. One day at the village carnival, Paari helps Thamarai win in a bike race and slips a cell phone into the prize pot. The two start to fall for each other while the other villagers complain about the polluted water. Thamarai's father learns of Paari and Thamarai's affair and tries to put an end to it. Paari comes up with a plan after hearing that the villagers are planning an attack on the nearby village. Paari stops the villagers and gives them a heartfelt message which makes the other villagers sympathize but Thamarai's father still remains adamant to keep the water. The villagers then ask Thamarai's father if he will marry his daughter to Paari. Paari doesn't ask for money but that the water gets supplied to the nearby village. Thamarai's father refuses to give the water but says that his daughter can marry Paari. Later, it is revealed that Paari and Thamarai didn't get married unless the water gets supplied to the other village. Thamarai's father says that until his death, he will not give one drop of water to the nearby village. The water does go to the nearby village after a smart trick done by Paari. Paari and Thamarai also get married. All together, everyone is happy as justice had been served.

== Cast ==
- Atharvaa as Paari
- Anandhi as Thamarai
- Lal as Thamarai's father and rice mill owner
- Rajashree as Saradha, Paari's mother
- Bose Venkat as Paari's father
- Shankar Devarajan as a Police Inspector
- Santhakumar as President of Vayalpaadu
- Supergood Subramani
- N. Ilambharathi
- Ravichandran

== Production ==
The film began production in June 2014, with Bala opting to fund a film to be directed by Sarkunam starring Atharvaa in the lead role. Despite early reports that the film would be titled Puzhudhi Parakkum Ooru, the makers denied the claim. The film progressed without a title till January 2015, when the team christened the project as Chandi Veeran. Bala sold the film to Sri Green Productions thereafter, after the film was completed and the third schedule was finished at KASANGADU, Rajapalayam, mannarkudi and Alathur.

== Soundtrack ==
The soundtrack was composed by S. N. Arunagiri.

No.	Song	Singer(s)	Lyricist(s)
1	"Altamappu"	Velmurugan, Mahalingam	
2	"Alunguren Kulunguraen"	Namitha Babu, Prasanna Rao	Mani Amuthavan
3	"Eechampazha"	Guru	
4	"Kothani"	Anitha Karthikeyan, M. L. R. Karthikeyan	
5	"Thaaipaalum Thanneerum"	Chinnaponnu, Anthony Daasan	

== Reception ==
Baradwaj Rangan from The Hindu called Chandi Veeran a "disappointingly generic drama". The Times of India gave 2.5 stars out of 5 and wrote, "The problem is that the film cannot find its tone and so, the narration suffers. The filmmaking, too, lacks grace, with hurried camerawork and choppy editing that makes the film visually inelegant. We never see the confident Sarkunam of Kalavani and Vaagai Sooda Vaa." Sify wrote, "Though the intention...to convey a message on water scarcity and nonviolence is laudable, the film is too preachy and loud with an abrupt comedy ending...Chandi Veeran is yet another half baked movie from Sarkunam".

In contrast, Rediff wrote, "at just under two hours, with a decent plot, some good performances and great visuals, director Sarkunam's Chandi Veeran is worth a watch". Indiaglitz wrote, "The film is definitely worth your time and money for presenting a vital issue in a largely engaging manner".
