= Maayavi =

2005 Tamil film

- Poster
- Directed by: Singampuli
- Written by: Singampuli; Viji (dialogues)
- Produced by: Kalaipuli S. Thanu; Bala
- Starring: Suriya; Jyothika; Sathyan
- Cinematography: R. Rathnavelu
- Edited by: Suresh Urs
- Music by: Devi Sri Prasad
- Production companies: B Studios; V. Creations
- Release date: 10 March 2005
- Running time: 135 minutes
- Country: India
- Language: Tamil

Maayavi (transl. Magician) is a 2005 Indian Tamil-language black comedy film directed by Singampuli that stars Suriya and Jyothika (who plays a fictional version of herself), whilst Vijayakanth makes a cameo. The film's score and soundtrack were composed by Devi Sri Prasad. The plot is loosely based on the novel The Fan Club by Irving Wallace.

== Plot ==
Abhes Balayya (Suriya), the guide conman thief, is footloose and fancy-free. He and his acolyte Sathyaraj (Sathyan) have no hangups in life. Balayya's problems start when he and Sathyaraj land up in a huge villa on the beachfront. It is actually actress Jyotika's (Jyothika) house. When they realize it, they want to replace what they have taken. As it happens, the actress catches them and creates a huge issue out of it. For their efforts, they are put behind bars. Jyotika does not like Balayya at all. Balayya goes out to take revenge on her and kidnap her. Just about when the whole industry and her family tries to trace Jyotika, she understands the real Balayya. In the end, Balayya comes to see her and gives her a gift, which is the photographs they took together.

== Cast ==
- Suriya as Abhes Balayya
- Jyothika as herself
- Sathyan as Sathyaraj
- Sangili Murugan as Asari
- Himani Shivpuri as Jyothika's mother
- Vishnupriya as Sigappi
- Shanmugaraj as Shanmugam
- Aarthi as Constable Eshwari
- Srilekha Rajendran as Asari's wife
- Besant Nagar Ravi as himself
- S. Ramana Girivasan as Inspector Neelakandan
- Ramu as Police officer
- Halwa Vasu as Pickpocket
- Muthukaalai as Chepauk railway station henchman
- Suruli Manohar as Watchman

=== Special appearances ===
- Vijayakanth as himself (uncredited)
- K. S. Ravikumar as himself
- R. B. Choudary as himself
- Roja as herself
- Veerasamy as himself
- R. Sundarrajan as himself
- R. Pandiarajan as himself
- Vikram Dharma as himself (uncredited)
- Rocky Rajesh as himself (uncredited)
- Appukutty as Volleyball player (uncredited)

== Production ==
Director Bala forayed into production with this film. Suriya plays a tour guide in Mahabalipuram.

== Soundtrack ==
Maayavi

Soundtrack album by Devi Sri Prasad
- Released: 11 February 2005
- Genre: Feature film soundtrack
- Length: 24:45
- Labels: Ayngaran Music; An Ak Audio
- Producer: Devi Sri Prasad

Devi Sri Prasad chronology
| Thirupaachi (2005) | Maayavi (2005) | Bunny (2005) |

The film's soundtrack was scored by Devi Sri Prasad, marking his first collaboration with Suriya. Prasad reused the songs "Gongura Thotakada" and "Silakemo" from Venky and reused them as "Kaathadi Pole" and "Tamizh Naattil", respectively. The song "Kadavul Thandha" is based on "Eppudu" from Sontham.

| No. | Title | Lyrics | Singer(s) | Length |
|---|---|---|---|---|
| 1. | "Jo Jo Jothika" | Palani Bharathi | Tippu, Sudha | 5:32 |
| 2. | "Kadavul Thandha" | Palani Bharathi | Kalpana, S. P. B. Charan | 4:34 |
| 3. | "Tamizh Naattil" | Kabilan | Palakkad Sreeram, Malathy Lakshman | 3:37 |
| 4. | "Oru Dhevaloga Raani" | Yugabharathi | Sumangali | 4:22 |
| 5. | "Maayavi" | Pa. Vijay | K. S. Chithra, Ranjith, Devi Sri Prasad | 4:21 |
| 6. | "Kaathadi Pole" | Na. Muthukumar | Pushpavanam Kuppusamy, Kalpana Raghavendar | 2:19 |

== Release and reception ==
The Hindu wrote how the idea of an actress being kidnapped was present in the film Vaaname Ellai. Chennai Online gave a negative review citing "It's meant to be a total comic entertainer, but the comedy being mostly juvenile, it starts grating on your nerves after a time." Visual Dasan of Kalki wrote a rusted screenplay doesn't need a grand plot. The first requirement is interesting and non-boring incidents. Mayavi is a colorful example of this. Sify wrote "Mayaavi is a jolly fun ride in the first half for its cute concept and silly slapstick comedy. The storyline has been explored earlier by Hollywood directors and later by Ramgopal Varma with Mast and recently in a Malayalam film Immini Nalloral. But the second half lags with too many unwanted sentiments and offers little in the way of surprise in the climax". Deccan Herald wrote "Bala, who has produced this film and let his protege weird the megaphone, is behind almost all the scenes and sees to it that the film moves at a good pace. Only in the second half he seems to have taken rest and the film drags a bit. Nothing much to write about the songs but the camerawork is noteworthy. In short, Mayaavi is an entertainer".
