= B Studios =

Indian film company

- Type: Film production Film distribution
- Industry: Entertainment
- Founded: 2004
- Headquarters: Chennai, India
- Key people: Bala
- Products: Motion pictures (Tamil)

B Studios is an Indian film production and distribution company headed by Bala. In the recent past, B Studios has financed several of Bala's directorial ventures, and other films by filmmakers including Mysskin and Sarkunam.

== History ==
In September 2004, director Bala revealed that he had launched his own production house, B Studios, to "give opportunity for new talent". He announced his intentions of producing two films a year and also venturing into ad films. Subsequently, the first venture was Maayavi (2005) directed by Singampuli, a comedy film starring Suriya and Jyothika in the lead roles. As a result of their association in Naan Kadavul in late 2005, B Studios agreed to produce Ajith Kumar's Paramasivan (2006), but later opted out. B Studios were also briefly involved with the production of Vishnuvardhan's Sarvam (2009) during June 2006, when the film was announced with Suriya and Ileana D'Cruz in the lead roles. Initially planned as a co-production with Studio Green, the film failed to progress and was released with different makers and a different cast in 2009.

Following the release of Naan Kadavul in early 2009, Bala announced that he would finance another film with Suriya for director Singampuli and a film with Jayam Ravi for Aacharya Ravi, but neither materialised. Bala has since financed his own projects, as well as individual films from Mysskin and Sarkunam.

== Filmography ==
Title	Year	Director	Cast	Synopsis	Ref.
Maayavi	2005	Singampuli	Suriya, Jyothika, Sathyan	A famous actress, after being kidnapped by a fan of hers, starts liking him.	
Paradesi	2013	Bala	Atharvaa, Vedhika, Sai Dhanshika	A rural man is lured by the promise of money signs up to work on a faraway tea plantation for colonisers.	
Pisaasu	2014	Mysskin	Naga, Prayaga Martin, Radha Ravi	A man experiences paranormal activities at his house after the death of a girl who he tried to save.	
Chandi Veeran	2015	Sarkunam	Atharvaa, Anandhi, Lal	A young man returning from abroad tries to stop a village feud on water sharing.	
Tharai Thappattai	2016	Bala	Sasikumar, Varalaxmi Sarathkumar, R. K. Suresh	The leader of a struggling dance troupe is torn over whether he should fall in love with its principal dancer.	
Naachiyaar	2018	Bala	Jyothika, G. V. Prakash Kumar, Ivana	The police work to uncover the truth after a young man is accused of assaulting his girlfriend.	
Vanangaan	2025	Bala	Arun Vijay, Roshni Prakash, Ridha		
