= Vanangaan =

2025 film by Bala

- Theatrical release poster
- Directed by: Bala
- Written by: Bala
- Produced by: Bala; Suresh Kamatchi
- Starring: Arun Vijay; Ridha; Roshni Prakash
- Cinematography: R. B. Gurudev
- Edited by: Sathish Suriya
- Music by: Songs: G. V. Prakash Kumar; Score: Sam C. S.
- Production companies: B Studios; V House Productions
- Release date: 10 January 2025
- Running time: 121 minutes
- Country: India
- Language: Tamil

Vanangaan (transl. One Who Will Not Bow Down) is a 2025 Indian Tamil-language action drama film written, directed and co-produced by Bala under B Studios, along with Suresh Kamatchi under V House Productions. The film stars Arun Vijay, Ridha and Roshni Prakash, with P. Samuthirakani and Mysskin in supporting roles. It revolves around the deaf-mute security guard of an orphanage who pursues vengeance after girls in the orphanage are sexually abused.

The film was officially announced in March 2022, with Suriya starring and producing under his banner 2D Entertainment, under the tentative title Suriya 41, while the official title Vanangaan was announced that July. Despite some filming progress, Suriya and 2D Entertainment withdrew from the project that December following storyline changes. Arun replaced him while Bala took over producing alongside Suresh Kamatchi. Principal photography with Arun commenced in March 2023 and wrapped in April 2024. The film has music composed by G. V. Prakash Kumar, cinematography handled by R. B. Gurudev and editing by Sathish Suriya.

Vanangaan was released worldwide on 10 January 2025 in theatres. The film received mixed-to-negative reviews from the critics, and underperformed at the box-office.

== Plot ==
Koti, a deaf-mute man, resides in Kanyakumari with his sister Devi, relying on odd jobs for sustenance. Orphaned by the 2004 Indian Ocean earthquake and tsunami, they were rescued and sheltered by a compassionate local church priest. Despite his disability, Koti possesses a strong sense of justice, particularly regarding violence against women. He uses his physical strength to punish offenders, often landing himself in trouble.

Tina, a local guide, has harboured a childhood crush on Koti, but he remains indifferent. Undeterred, Tina frequently teases Koti, who responds with physical aggression, yet she persists in her pursuit. Tina's parents disapprove of her feelings, but she disregards their concerns. Tina assists Koti in shutting down a wine shop near the church, and soon, Koti falls in love with Tina. With Tina and Devi's help, Koti secures a security guard and helper job at Mira Orphanage, run by Saradha Devi. Koti forms strong bonds with the children, particularly the teenage visually impaired girls.

One day, Koti discovers three workers exploiting the girls' disability to voyeur them while they are bathing. Enraged, Koti murders two of the perpetrators and voluntarily surrenders to the police. This act shocks Devi, who abhors her brother's resort to violence. At the court, Koti declines to disclose the reason behind the murders, infuriating the judge, who orders his immediate imprisonment and a probe by DSP Kathiravan. Kathiravan struggles to uncover the motive behind the murders and resorts to a narco-analysis test. However, even under sedation, Koti remains resolute and refuses to reveal the motive. The psychiatrist refuses to co-operate with Kathiravan, citing concerns that increasing the sedative dosage could prove fatal for Koti.

Due to lack of evidence, the judge releases Koti on bail. Upon release, he becomes fixated on finding the third perpetrator, who had escaped, to exact revenge. Devi grows frustrated with Koti's relentless pursuit of violence. Kathiravan, determined to uncover the motive, delves into Koti's past and discovers that Devi is not his biological sister. He uses this information to manipulate Devi emotionally, hoping she can extract the truth from Koti. However, Koti remains tight-lipped, fearing that revealing the truth could compromise the modesty of the visually impaired girls at the orphanage. Koti eventually tracks down the third perpetrator and kills him after castrating him. This crime sends shockwaves as the killer, who was out on bail for the previous two murders, struck again.

As Kathiravan reviews the narco-analysis recordings, he discovers that the three victims killed by Koti had indeed misbehaved with the visually impaired girls. He shares this information with the judge and secretly arranges for the girls to testify at the court. As a result, the judge, now aware of the circumstances, releases Koti, citing that circumstantial evidence alone is insufficient for conviction. The orphanage inmates and local community rejoice at Koti's release. Devi, unaware of the truth, takes her own life, fearing that Koti would receive the death penalty, leaving Koti shattered.

== Cast ==
- Arun Vijay as Koti
- Ridha as Devi
- Roshni Prakash as Tina
- P. Samuthirakani as DSP R. Kathiravan IPS
- Mysskin as a Judge Kuberan
- Chhaya Devi as Saradha Devi
- Bala Sivaji as a church priest
- Shanmugarajan as Joseph
- Yohan Chacko
- Kavitha Gopi as Tina's mother
- Deepika Deedoll
- Brinda Sarathy
- Mai Pa Narayanan as an advocate
- Aruldoss as a bar owner
- Munish Sivagurunath
- Pondy Ravi as Inspector Manikandan
- Cheranraj as an Inspector
- Gadam Kishan as a Public prosecutor
- Janaki Suresh

== Production ==
Suriya announced officially on 28 March 2022 that his next film, tentatively titled Suriya 41, would be directed by Bala and produced by himself and Jyothika under 2D Entertainment. On Bala's birthday, 11 July 2022, Suriya released the first look poster and the title Vanangaan in Tamil and Achaludu in Telugu. This would have been the third collaboration of Suriya and Bala after Nandhaa and Pithamagan. Suriya was reportedly playing dual roles, one of them deaf and mute. Krithi Shetty and Mamitha Baiju were signed on to play the female leads.

Filming was initially planned to be completed entirely in three months; however, work on the film stopped in June due to a reported tiff between the lead actor and director. Following this, Vanangaan was rumoured to have been dropped, which Suriya debunked with a social media post in which he stated that he was "waiting to be back on sets". However, on 4 December 2022, Bala announced that Suriya and 2D Entertainment were no longer part of the project, citing changes in the film's story. By March 2023, Arun Vijay was confirmed as Suriya's replacement and had begun filming, while Roshni Prakash replaced Shetty, and Ridha joined as the other lead actress. The final filming schedule took place in Tiruvannamalai. Filming wrapped in April 2024.

== Controversies ==
In late February 2024, Mamitha Baiju allegedly accused Bala of physically and mentally assaulting her during production, which eventually made her opt out of the film. Later, she clarified that it was misinterpreted by the media and she did not experience any such incidents, but she opted out of due to other commitments. Later, film producer S. Saravanan of Orange Productions attempted to restrain the film's release via the Madras High Court due to its title, claiming he registered the title Vanangaan first in 2020. However, the court rejected his request.

== Music ==
Vanangaan

Soundtrack album by G. V. Prakash Kumar
- Released: 18 December 2024
- Genre: Feature film soundtrack
- Language: Tamil
- Producer: G. V. Prakash Kumar

G. V. Prakash Kumar chronology
Matka (2024)	Vanangaan (2024)	Emergency (2025)

Singles from Vanangaan
- 1. "Irai Nooru" Released: 21 December 2024; 2. "Mounam Pole" Released: 30 December 2024; 3. "Mugilin Mele" Released: 6 January 2025

External audio
- Vanangaan Songs | Juke Box on YouTube

The music is composed by G. V. Prakash Kumar. Following the audio launch event on 18 December 2024, the audio jukebox was released. The first single "Irai Nooru" was released on 21 December 2024. The second single "Mounam Pole" was released on 30 December 2024. The third single "Mugilin Mele" was released on 6 January 2025.

Track listing
No.	Title	Lyrics	Singer(s)	Length
1.	"Irai Nooru"	Karthik Netha	Madhu Balakrishnan
2.	"Mugilin Mele"	Selvamira	Saindhavi
3.	"Mounam Pole" (Male Version)	Karthik Netha	Sathya Prakash
4.	"Mounam Pole" (Female Version)	Karthik Netha	Rakshita Suresh
5.	"Yaaro Nee Yaaro"	Karthik Netha	Madhu Balakrishnan

== Release ==
=== Theatrical ===
Vanangaan was released in theatres on 10 January 2025, during the week of Pongal.

== Reception ==
=== Critical response ===
Vanangaan received mixed-to-negative reviews from critics, who criticised its problematic portrayal of sensitive issues, writing and lack of emotional depth. However, the cast performances (especially Arun Vijay's) were praised.

A critic from Hindu Tamil Thisai rated the film 3/5, while another critic from Dinamalar rated it 2.75/5. M Suganth of The Times of India gave 2.5/5 stars and wrote "Some portions of Vanangaan and the Bala-isms work, but most often, Bala's storytelling and the filmmaking seem past their expiry date. [...] Everything feels perfunctory, and even Arun Vijay's robust performance cannot elevate the routine nature of the film's proceedings." Avinash Ramachandran of The Indian Express gave 2/5 stars and wrote "Watching Vanangaan unfold on screen, it makes one wonder why there is a distinct lack of cohesiveness in the narrative.[...] It is such writing shockers that pull Vanangaan down, and makes Bala, the man who would bow to no one, feel like he compromised a bit too much." Janani K of India Today gave 2/5 stars and wrote "Arun's performance and how the court proceedings make the film interesting. However, the way Bala chose to end the film with the death of a character, once again questions his intentions. If you love films where heroes turn saviours for women, then Vanangaan might be for you."

Anusha Sundar of OTTPlay gave 1.5/5 stars and wrote "Vanangaan takes up the done-to-death issue of sexual assault as if there is nothing else that is plaguing society. [...] Vanangaan is grotesque and would have done more good than bad had it was not made." Prashanth Vallavan of Cinema Express gave 1.5/5 stars and wrote "With a plethora of problematic takes and half-baked ideas, Vanangaan's biggest issue remains its complete disinterest in giving us a cohesive story.[...] However, if the film's intention to milk strong emotions out of the audience is not in proportion to the overall theme, intent, and storytelling purposes, then it comes across as a weak effort." Bhuvanesh Chandar of The Hindu wrote "A major setback for Vanangaan is the lack of a strong antagonist; you get nothing in seeing a typical vigilante easily take down one-dimensional perverts. The bigger issue is how the film uses the plight of these underprivileged women as mere pawns to milk our sympathies." Vishal Menon of The Hollywood Reporter India negatively called the film a mixture of Bala's earlier films and his "weakest film yet, one that repeats everything Bala is known for, albeit without the sting".
