= Jigel =

- Theatrical release poster
- Directed by: Malli Yeluri
- Produced by: Y Jagan Mohan; Allam Nagarjuna
- Starring: Thrigun; Megha Chowdhury; Posani Krishna Murali
- Cinematography: Vasu
- Edited by: Kotagiri Venkateswara Rao
- Music by: Mantra Anand
- Production companies: Apple Creations; Sri Indira Combines
- Release date: 7 March 2025
- Country: India
- Language: Telugu

Jigel is a 2025 Indian Telugu-language romantic thriller film directed by Malli Yeluri. The film stars Thrigun and Megha Chowdhury in the lead roles, alongside Posani Krishna Murali, Sayaji Shinde, and Raghu Babu. The film was produced by Y Jagan Mohan and Allam Nagarjuna under the banner of Apple Creations and Sri Indira Combines.

== Cast ==
- Thrigun
- Megha Chowdhury
- Posani Krishna Murali
- Sayaji Shinde
- Raghu Babu
- Balireddy Pruthviraj
- Madhu Nama Dan
- Mukku Avinash
- Jayavani

== Production ==
The film is directed by Malli Yeluri. Vasu is the cinematographer, editing is done by Kotagiri Venkateswara Rao. The film has music composed by Mantra Anand.

== Reception ==
Deccan Chronicle critic wrote that "Overall, Jigel successfully captivates the audience with its mix of romance, comedy, and suspense-thriller elements. It’s a fun and engaging watch. Go and watch it!" Suhas Sistu of The Hans India wrote that "If you’re looking for a feel-good heist comedy with romance and suspense, Jigel is definitely worth watching!" and rated three out of five. News18 wrote that "This film will entertain the audience of all centers."
