= Tharai Thappattai =

2016 film directed by Bala

- Directed by: Bala
- Written by: Bala
- Produced by: M. Sasikumar; Bala
- Starring: M. Sasikumar; Varalaxmi Sarathkumar
- Cinematography: Chezhiyan
- Edited by: G. Sasikumar
- Music by: Ilaiyaraaja
- Production companies: Company Production; B Studios
- Distributed by: Ayngaran International Media
- Release date: 14 January 2016
- Country: India
- Language: Tamil

Tharai Thappattai is a 2016 Tamil-language psychological action drama film written, produced and directed by Bala. The film features M. Sasikumar and Varalaxmi Sarathkumar in the leading roles, while Ilaiyaraaja composed the film's music based on karakattam. This film also happened to be Ilaiyaraaja's 1000th film. The film began production in 2013 and released on 14 January 2016. Ilaiyaraaja won the National Film Award for Best Background Score at the 63rd National Film Awards.

== Plot ==
The story opens with an Indian guide woman leading a Discovery channel TV team asking an elderly villager named Saamipulavan to perform his mridangam art for their documentary. While he performs but refuses to change for the commercial angle, his son, Sannasi, and his troupe perform.

Sannasi is the head of a dance troupe, while Sooravali is the chief dancer who loves him. Times are tough, and the ensemble jumps at a chance to perform in the Andaman Islands for a hefty sum, but they soon discover that the sponsors are more interested in the women than their dance. The hotel's security throws them out, and the event manager rips their tickets back home when Sooravalli physically assaults them for their improper advances. The troupe saves money by doing manual labour at a construction site. Sooravalli decides to dance to collect money to reach home by ship. Her performance ends in unconsciousness from fatigue and blood loss.

Humiliated, they return home, only to continue their struggle without work. At this time, Sooravali receives a marriage proposal from Karuppaiah, who seems decent and claims to have a government job and a decent salary. Sannasi is initially angry and beats up Karuppaiah, but after Sooravali's mother pleads with him, he eventually forces Sooravali to accept the proposal.

After Sooravali's marriage and departure, the troupe attempts to continue working, but people reject them as Sooravali is the main attraction. Sannasi finds a replacement but is forced to compromise with his principles and perform at a funeral. Saamipulavan, who has always disapproved of what he considers his son's adulteration and lowering of the art form, lambasts him for this. Sannasi retaliates and insults Saamipulavan's knowledge and talent, leaving him hurt. One day, Samipulavan gets called to perform a concert in front of high-ranking foreign officials, including the Governor of Australia. His singing performance is appreciated, and the governor lauds him, finally validating him after years of rejection and obscurity. He returns home and tells Sannasi that he has won, but suddenly he coughs and passes away.

After the funeral, Sooravali's mother visits Sannasi. He expresses his disappointment that Sooravali has never checked in after her marriage, not even upon his father's death. Sooravali's mother breaks down and tells Sannasi that she has not heard from Sooravali since the wedding. Sannasi is shocked to learn that Karuppaiah lied about his job and has disappeared with Sooravali. Sannasi tracks Sooravali down and finds her in an unfamiliar house. She reveals what happened. It turns out that Karuppaiah is a pimp who smokes and drinks. He also tonsures women who run brothels. He married Sooravali to fulfill the request of a man who wanted her in return for a favour. Karuppiah eventually forces Sooravali to be the surrogate for a wealthy man whose astrologer has divined that he requires a female heir born on a specific day and time with the man's sperm.

Karuppaiah discovers Sannasi and beats him unconscious. Karuppaiah then takes Sooravali away for delivery to the hospital. The hospital doctor refuses to perform a C-section because of complications that would endanger Sooravali or her child. Karuppaiah pays a mortuary technician to perform the C-section secretly. Because the birth has to occur at a specific time, Karuppaiah instructs the technician to begin when he whistles. As he and his men wait outside, Sannasi appears and attacks them. He dispatches Karuppaiah's men and then goes after Karuppaiah, demanding to know Sooravali's whereabouts. However, Karuppaiah refuses to divulge it. Sannasi kills Karuppaiah by stabbing him in the throat with a wooden spike.

Sannasi then enters the mortuary and kills the technician. He finds Sooravali and tries to wake her, but discovers that she has died after the technician performed the C-section on his own. Sannasi is grief-stricken, but upon hearing cries, he discovers that Sooravali's baby has survived. He takes the baby and returns home.

== Cast ==
- M. Sasikumar as Sannasi
- Varalaxmi Sarathkumar as Sooravali
- G. M. Kumar as Saamipulavan, Sannasi's father
- R. K. Suresh as Karuppaiah
- Gayathri Raghuram as replacement dancer after Sooravali's departure
- Anthony Daasan as Nadaswaram instrumentialist in dance group
- Ramya NSK as Ramya, Indian guide woman
- Dr Kingmohan as fake collector
- Amudhavanan as parai drummer and dancer in dance group
- Anandhi Ajay as Kalaivani, a dancer
- K. Ramaraj
- Arjun Maravan as Vellaiyan
- Kaavya Sha as Karuppuchellam, a dancer
- Chevvalai Rasu as mrindangam instrumentalist in dance troupe
- Akshaya Kimmy as Tholaimalar
- Sahana Sheddy as Sothiyam

== Production ==
Director Bala finalised his next project following Paradesi (2013) only in October 2013 and revealed that he would make a film starring his former protege Sasikumar in the lead role, while G. V. Prakash Kumar and Kishore would be the film's composer and editor respectively. In January 2014, Bala decided to call Ilaiyaraaja in to the project to replace G. V. Prakash.

A number of actresses, including Shriya Saran, Shravanthi Sainath, auditioned for the lead actress before Varalaxmi Sarathkumar was finalised, and Bala asked her to lose ten kilograms for the film. Sasikumar was asked to shave his trademark beard and sport a thin moustache, in order to reportedly play a Nadaswaram player. Furthermore, to look the part, he had to train for a month with folk singers and dancers brought in by Bala. Sasikumar also sported long hair for the film. Producer R. K. Suresh of Studio 9 Media Works, was signed on to play the antagonist in the film and undertook training in fight scenes with action choreographer Pandian. The team also selected Hindi film maker Satish Kaushik to portray a character in the film, and he joined the team in the third schedule, while director Haricharan of Thoovanam (2007) was also signed to portray his first acting role. In January 2015, reports revealed that Kannada actress Kaavya Sha had been given a pivotal role in the film, which will mark her Tamil debut, after singer Pragathi Guruprasad had opted out of the role. Sahana Sheddy, who is well known for her role as Kavya on the Tamil serial, Azhagu (TV series) plays the role of one of the troupe dancers in this film. The title of the film was announced in March 2014 to be Tharai Thappattai, after titles including Karagattam and Paarai had been considered. Also by March 2014, it was revealed that Ilaiyaraaja had finished recording 12 songs for this film using a live orchestra, in a span of six days. Furthermore, since folk dance is an integral part of the film, he had used folk musicians who are not associated with the film industry. The film's shoot took over 100 days to finish, while the makers had a three-month break in 2015, owing to Sasikumar's hand injury, which he suffered while filming the climax.

== Soundtrack ==
The soundtrack has been composed by Ilaiyaraaja. The film was promoted as the 1000th film score of him. The album was released in on 25 December, after the Chennai floods. The soundtrack consists of seven tracks: five songs and two theme scores. Six of the tracks were released by Think Music in CDs, iTunes and on Store while one song was released as a single by Saregama. The single released by Saregama was the song "Aarambam Aavadhu", a Viswanathan–Ramamoorthy number from the 1959 film Thanga Padhumai, remixed in this film. The teaser of the film was also released on the same day. The first paragraph of the song Idarinum is from the third Thirumurai, penned by Thirugnanasambandar. The remaining portions of Idarinum, from En Ullam Kovil, have been penned by Ilaiyaraaja. Paaruruvaaya is from Manickavasagar's Thiruvasagam.

The album became popular on iTunes and on social media and was widely lauded by the media.

Tamil track listing
No.	Title	Lyrics	Music	Singer(s)	Length
1.	"Hero Intro Theme"		Ilaiyaraaja		1:31
2.	"Vathana Vathana Vadivelane"	Mohan Rajan	Ilaiyaraaja	Kavitha Gopi, Priyadarshini	2:47
3.	"Paruruvaaya"	Maanikkavaasagar (Thiruvasagam)	Ilaiyaraaja	Surmukhi Raman, D. Sathyaprakash	3:34
4.	"Idarinum"	Ilaiyaraaja	Ilaiyaraaja	Sharreth	4:44
5.	"Aattakkari Maman Ponnu"	Ilaiyaraaja	Ilaiyaraaja	M. M. Manasi, V. V. Prasanna	3:06
6.	"Thaarai Thappattai Theme"		Ilaiyaraaja		3:05
7.	"Aarambam Aavadhu"	Pattukkottai Kalyanasundaram	Viswanathan–Ramamoorthy (redone by Ilaiyaraaja)	Ananthu	4:42

== Critical reception ==
Rediff wrote "Thaarai Thappattai has all the elements that you expect from the brilliant director and while it may not appeal to all, it is definitely worth a watch." Baradwaj Rangan of The Hindu wrote "Bala essentially keeps making the same movie. He’s, repeatedly, to darkness, and love is but another stop on the tortuous road to doom. Plus, the highly stylised performances, which don’t seem to come from the actor so much as the director.". Gautaman Bhaskaran critic of The Hindustan Times gave 4 out of 5 rating and stated that" Sasikumar has always been a great actor, but the surprising find has been Varalaxmi Sarathkumar, who plays the dancer with a kind of unbelievable strength. In a way, the movie belongs to her".

A critic from Dinamalar gave mixed review.Samayam critic gave 3.5 out of 5 rating. A critic from Ananda Vikatan gave mixed reviews.

== Awards ==
At the 63rd National Film Awards, Ilaiyaraaja won for Best Background Score, a category bifurcated from Best Music Direction. However, he refused to accept the award, due to his displeasure with the awards committee's decision to bifurcate the Best Music Direction award, and explained, "What is the meaning of giving me an award for Best Music Direction – Background Score, and M. Jayachandran an award for Best Music Direction? It not only means that I have done an incomplete job as music director but also implies that only half of my work is good."

== See also ==
- Tharai
- Thappattai
