= Dhruv Vikram =

Indian actor, singer and lyricist

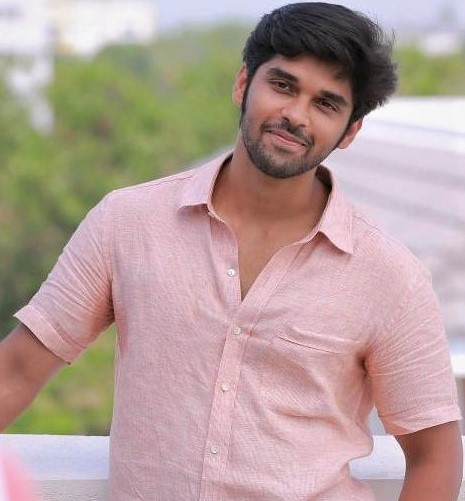
- Dhruv in 2019
- Born: Dhruv Vikram; 23 September 1997 (age 29); Chennai, Tamil Nadu, India
- Education: Lee Strasberg Theatre & Film Institute, New York
- Occupations: Actor, singer, lyricist
- Years active: 2019–present
- Father: Vikram
- Relatives: Vinod Raj (grandfather)

Dhruv Vikram (born 23 September 1997) is an Indian actor, singer and lyricist who works in Tamil films. The son of actor Vikram, he made his acting debut with the 2019 film Adithya Varma and starred with his father in Mahaan (2022).

== Early life ==
Dhruv was born on 23 September 1997 in Chennai to actor Vikram and his wife Shailaja. His elder sister Akshita is married to Manuranjith, who is the great-grandson of politician M. Karunanidhi. Dhruv's paternal grandfather Vinod Raj was also an actor who acted in a few Tamil films.

== Career ==
Dhruv had been approached by Pandiraj to play the role of Anbukkarasu in Pasanga (2008); however, Vikram was then not keen on letting his son get into acting and the role subsequently went to Kishore DS. An English-language short film titled "Goodnight Charlie" directed by Dhruv based on child abuse was released in 2016 on YouTube while he was pursuing a six-month filmmaking course at MetFilm School.

Dhruv was to have made his feature film debut with Bala's Varmaa, a remake of the Telugu film Arjun Reddy (2017); however, the release of the film was stalled after the producer was not content about the final product. The film was relaunched as Adithya Varma, directed by Gireesaaya, with Dhruv continuing his role, and released in 2019 with M. Suganth of The Times of India noting that "Dhruv Vikram comes up with a performance that captures Vijay Deverakonda's intense and raw act from the original note for note, but there is an assuredness and honesty here that makes us appreciate it rather than dismiss it just as mimicry". Varmaa had a delayed release in 2020 and Suganth stated that "As for Dhruv Vikram, he is rawer here, looking sure-footed in some scenes and like a novice in some".

Dhruv acted alongside his father in the latter's 60th film, Mahaan (2022) which was released directly on Amazon Prime Video. He also wrote and sang a song named "Missing Me" for the film. Later the same year, Dhruv wrote, sang and directed the music video of "Manase", a non-film song composed by Ujwal Gupta. The same year he sang another non-film song "Oru Kaayam", also composed by Gupta, and the following year "Poomadhiye", composed by Santhosh Narayanan. After a near-three hiatus, Dhruv returned to acting with Bison Kaalamaadan (2025). He has signed up for Jackie to be directed by Karan Aravind Kumar.

== Legal issues ==
On 12 August 2018, Dhruv was arrested after a car driven by him crashed into three auto rickshaws, injuring three people including an auto driver who had to be hospitalised. Dhruv was released on bail the same day but never charged with drunk driving.

== Filmography ==
Year	Title	Role(s)	Notes	Ref.
2019	Adithya Varma	Dr. Adithya Varma		
2020	Varmaa	Varmaa Vasudevan		
2022	Mahaan	Dadabhai "Dada" Naoroji		
2025	Bison Kaalamaadan	Kittan		
TBA	Jackie	Jackie		

== Discography ==
Year	Song(s)	Album	Composer	Lyrics	Language	Ref.
2019	"Edharkadi"	Adithya Varma	Radhan	Vivek, Dhruv Vikram (Rap)	Tamil	
2019	"Adithya Varma Theme" (Additional track)	Adithya Varma	Radhan		Tamil	
2022	"Missing Me"	Mahaan	Santhosh Narayanan	Vivek, Dhruv Vikram (Rap)	Tamil	
2022	"Manase"	Non-album single	Ujwal Gupta	Dhruv Vikram	Tamil	
2023	"Oru Kaayam"	Non-album single	Ujwal Gupta	Dhruv Vikram	Tamil	
2023	"Poomadhiye"	Non-album single	Santhosh Narayanan	Vivek	Tamil	
2023	"Odiyamma"	Hi Nanna	Hesham Abdul Wahab	Anantha Sriram	Telugu	
2023	"Odiyamma" (D)	Hi Nanna	Hesham Abdul Wahab	Vivek	Tamil	
2024	"Need Ya"	Non-album single	Ujwal Gupta	Vivek	Tamil	
2026	"Kudikara Nenju"	Hi	Jen Martin	Vishnu Edavan	Tamil	

== Awards and nominations ==
Year	Award	Category	Work	Result	Ref.
2020	13th Ananda Vikatan Cinema Awards	Best Debut – Male	Adithya Varma	Won	
2020	Zee Cine Awards Tamil	Best Debut – Male	Adithya Varma	Won	
2020	South Indian International Movie Awards	Best Debut – Male	Adithya Varma	Nominated	
2026	South Indian International Movie Awards	Best Actor	Bison Kaalamaadan	Won	
