= High-functioning alcoholic =

Person who maintains jobs and relationships while exhibiting alcoholism

A high-functioning alcoholic (HFA) is a person who maintains jobs and relationships while exhibiting alcoholism.

Many HFAs are not viewed as alcoholics by society because they do not fit the common alcoholic stereotype. Unlike the stereotypical alcoholic, HFAs have either succeeded or overachieved throughout their lifetimes. This can lead to denial of alcoholism by the HFA, co-workers, family members, and friends. Functional alcoholics account for 19.5 percent of total U.S. alcoholics, with 50 percent also being smokers and 33 percent having a multigenerational family history of alcoholism. Statistics from the Harvard School of Public Health indicated that 31 percent of college students show signs of alcohol abuse and six percent are dependent on alcohol. Doctors hope that the new definition will help identify severe cases of alcoholism early, rather than when the problem is fully developed.

High-functioning alcoholics may exhibit signs of alcohol dependence while still managing to fulfill their professional and personal responsibilities. Some common characteristics include denial, maintaining responsibilities, high alcohol tolerance, physical and mental health issues, and social isolation.

== Causes ==
=== Social drinking ===
Social drinking refers to consuming alcohol in casual settings like bars, nightclubs, or parties, focusing on the company rather than the amount of alcohol. However, unlike responsible drinking, it does not necessarily specify moderation or safety practices, but focuses on socializing and spending quality time with others. Occasional social drinking might not be a problem. However, regular social drinking can lead to dependence, including the development of high-functioning alcoholism. This means someone may appear to function normally in daily life while struggling with alcohol dependence.

== See also ==
- Alcohol (drug)
- Holiday heart syndrome
