= Naachiyaar =

- Film poster
- Directed by: Bala
- Written by: Bala
- Produced by: Bala
- Starring: Jyothika; G. V. Prakash Kumar; Ivana
- Cinematography: Theni Eswar
- Edited by: Sathish Suriya
- Music by: Ilaiyaraaja
- Production companies: B Studios; EON Studios
- Distributed by: Madhumathii Films
- Release date: 16 February 2018
- Running time: 100 minutes
- Country: India
- Language: Tamil

Naachiyaar is a 2018 Indian Tamil-language action crime film written, produced and directed by Bala. The film featured Jyothika in the title role, with G. V. Prakash Kumar and Ivana in other leading roles. The film tells the tale of the policewoman working to uncover the truth after a young man is accused of sexually assaulting his minor girlfriend. Featuring music composed by Ilaiyaraaja and cinematography by Eashwar, the film began production during March 2017 and was released on 16 February 2018.

== Plot ==
Assistant Commissioner Naachiyaar is a tough policewoman in Chennai who is put in charge of solving an underage rape case. She tracks down a heavily pregnant Arasi, the victim, on the run from her uncle and his goons, who plan to get her an abortion. Although Naachiyaar saves Arasi, her uncle and his friends escape and go into hiding. Meanwhile, Naachiyaar's colleague, Feroz, arrests the suspect, Kaathu. He is then sent to a juvenile detention facility, where he recounts his story to one of the wardens, who is sympathetic towards him.

Through flashbacks, we see how Kaathu and Arasi first met. Both are still teenagers from the slums, but they do not go to school and are forced to work to help support their respective families. Arasi works as a maid for wealthy families, while Kaathu does odd jobs for a living. One day, while her employers are away, Arasi invites Kaathu into the house where they (impulsively) make love. However, Arasi quickly regrets this and pushes Kaathu away, who leaves upset.

Back in the present day, Arasi gives birth to a healthy baby boy, and Naachiyaar lets Arasi stay with her until the local government can ensure the mother and baby have a safe place to stay. However, DNA test results reveal that Kaathu is not the father of Arasi's child. Naachiyaar decides to keep this a secret from Arasi until they can investigate this case even further.

Feroz arrests Arasi's uncle and manipulates him into leading them to a fake doctor who conducts illegal abortions. After Naachiyaar threatens him, the fake doctor reveals that one of his most powerful clients, a wealthy North India-based moneylender, Thangamani Prabhu, is the one who raped Arasi. One day, when Arasi was working alone at his home, the moneylender took advantage of her when she fainted. The elderly moneylender, who holds a powerful position in society, immediately calls the fake doctor who lies about it being safe despite him not using a condom, planning to blackmail the moneylender once Arasi becomes pregnant.

Naachiyaar and Feroz go to the moneylender to arrest him, but are summoned back to their superior's office since the culprit is very wealthy and well-connected. After getting information about her suspension, Naachiyaar abducts and thrashes the moneylender late at night and castrates him at a dumpyard. She then faces an enquiry and is transferred because the police department fears bad press if action is taken against Naachiyaar, who gained immense popularity due to the case. She took the initiative to reunite Kaathu with Arasi. Her husband tells Kaathu the truth, but Naachiyaar refrains from revealing the truth to Arasi.

Kaathu requests Naachiyaar not to reveal the truth to Arasi. As far as Kaathu is concerned, the baby boy is his, and he plans to make sure Arasi never learns the truth. The couple with the baby happily board a bus.

== Cast ==
- Jyothika as P. Naachiyaar Kumari IPS
- G. V. Prakash Kumar as Kaathavarayan (Kaathu)
- Ivana as Kottaiarasi (Arasi)
- Rockline Venkatesh as Feroz Khan
- Dr. Gurushankar as Naachiyaar's husband
- Thangamani Prabhu as Moneylender
- Kulappulli Leela
- Dharani Vasudevan

== Production ==
In February 2017, Bala confirmed that his next project would be a crime thriller starring Jyothika in the lead role, and chose to postpone the shoot of a proposed film featuring Yuvan and Pragathi Guruprasad. To accommodate dates for the film, Jyothika opted out of her commitments to play a role alongside Vijay in Mersal (2017). The film was reported to be set in the slums, with actor Sri signed to portray another leading character. Bala later replaced Sri with G. V. Prakash Kumar, who agreed to work on the film simultaneously with several other projects. Film producer Rockline Venkatesh also joined the cast to play a supporting role, after Bala spontaneously enquired about his interest in working as an actor. Malayalam actress Ivana was cast in a role after Bala had spotted a news article about her work in the film, Anuraga Karikkin Vellam (2016). He requested her to find a new stage name rather than use her original name of Aleena Shaji, prompting her to use Ivana. Prior to release, the media reported that the story was based on the life of psycho killer Jayaprakash, who killed nine of his relatives in the 1980s at Valasaravakkam, Chennai.

The principal shoot of the film began in March 2017, with a first look poster released featuring Jyothika and G. V. Prakash Kumar. As Prakash Kumar was working simultaneously on four other projects, he requested some time before starting the shoot. Instead of delaying the project, Bala worked solely on Jyothika's scenes to ensure the film was shot within the projected time of forty days. By the time he joined the set, Prakash Kumar reported to sets by 6 am every day, took an hour to put three layers of dark make-up and coloured his hair to a brownish-orange colour. Unlike several of Bala's previous films, Naachiyar completed production quickly and by early July 2017, "ninety percent" of the shoot was revealed to be over, with most scenes filmed in North Chennai and studios in the city. The shoot of the film was completed in mid-July 2017 in the Cuddalore district. Jyothika dubbed for the role herself and Bala wanted a base voice from the actress, so sat throughout the dubbing to get the desired output. Jyothika had earlier changed her diet plans by avoiding rice, wheat and bread to reduce nearly 10 kilograms for her work in Naachiyaar.

Following the release of a teaser trailer, a man named Rajan from Mettupalayam filed legal case over the use of vulgar language in the teaser. Jyothika later stated that such outrage was only registered because a woman had spoken the dialogue and that the dialogue was a necessity in the film.

== Soundtrack ==
The soundtrack features one song composed by Ilaiyaraaja. As the album featured only one song, Bala opted against releasing the soundtrack of the film prior to its release.

- "Unna Vitta Yaarum Illa" - G. V. Prakash Kumar, Priyanka

== Release and Reception ==
Upon release, the film received positive response from both critics and audience. As a result the film was dubbed and released in Hindi as Tejasvini 2 in 2020 and in Telugu as Jhansi.
