= Bala (director) =

Indian film director and screenwriter

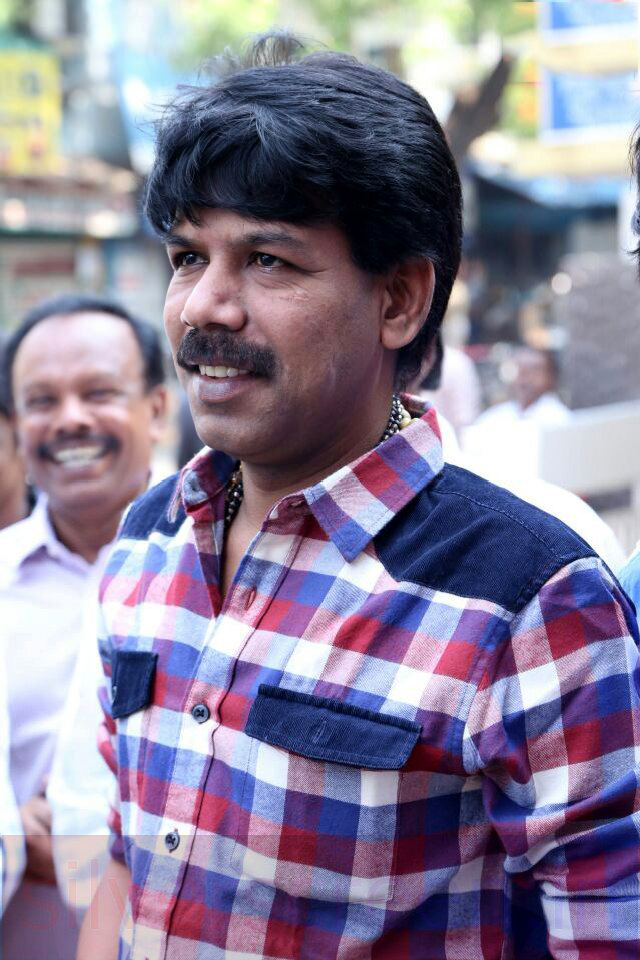
- Bala at the audio launch for Salim
- Born: Bala Palanisamy; 11 July 1966 (age 60); Uthamapalayam, Madras State, India
- Education: American College, Madurai
- Occupations: Film director, Screenwriter, Film producer
- Years active: 1998–present
- Spouse: Muthumalar (m. 2004; div. 2022)
- Children: 1

Bala is an Indian film director, screenwriter, and film producer who predominantly works in Tamil cinema. He has been praised for "revolutionizing Tamil cinema" through his realistic, dark, and disturbing depiction of the working class on celluloid screen. His films are known to be tragic and disturbing.

== Film career ==
=== Early work before directorial ===
Bala was introduced by lyricist Arivumathi to director Balu Mahendra. Initially, he began working as a production assistant under him. Later Bala turned to work with him as assistant director in his movies.

=== 1999-2008: Debut and breakthrough ===
Bala made his directorial debut with Sethu in 1999, which gave a break to Vikram, the film's lead actor, who was also struggling in the Tamil film industry for almost a decade without a hit and recognition. More than 60 distributors saw the film and hesitated to screen it because of its tragic ending. The film was released on a low profile without any advertisement, but after the first few days, the film picked up pace and started running to packed houses just through word of mouth. The film was said to have initiated a 'new wave' as it received critical acclaim and became a hit. Its success led to remakes in Kannada (Huchcha), Telugu (Seshu), and Hindi (Tere Naam) languages. He next made Nandhaa in 2001, which gave a breakthrough for Suriya in the industry.

After delivering superhit films each with Vikram and Suriya, Bala reunited with both actors for the second time, and he made the two leading actors come together for the first time in Pithamagan (2003). Bala sketched the lead characters of the film well and impressed fans with the twists and turns. Pithamagan mixed with different emotions made the audience enjoy the film, and the director gave an emotional climax to make the film remembered by fans for a long time.

=== 2009-2019: Continued success ===
In 2009, Naan Kadavul featuring Arya and Pooja Umashankar, won its first National Film Award for Best Direction. In 2011, Arya and Vishal playing the lead roles in the comedy drama Avan Ivan. Produced by Bala himself under the banner of B Studios, Paradesi (2013), takes on the challenge of transforming the boy-next-door looks of Atharvaa into an almost bald, unsophisticated village simpleton of a bygone era. After working with Ilaiyaraaja and Yuvan Shankar Raja in his earlier films, director Bala for the first time teams up with G. V. Prakash Kumar for the music of Paradesi. In 2016, overall the performances in Tharai Thappattai are of superior quality and so is the technical aspects. In 2018, Naachiyaar stars Jyothika in the titular role, while G. V. Prakash Kumar and newcomer Ivana play important supporting characters in this engaging crime thriller.

=== 2020-present: Career slump ===
In 2017, Bala was chosen as the director of Varmaa, the Tamil remake of Arjun Reddy, for which the rights were bought by E4 Entertainment. In February 2019, E4 Entertainment issued a press statement stating that they would go for a complete re-shoot as they were not satisfied with the final cut provided by Bala. They added that the film would be relaunched with a completely new cast and crew while retaining lead actor Dhruv Vikram. Bala disagreed with these comments, saying it was his own decision to quit the film "in order to safeguard creative freedom" because he was asked to make changes. This became the first such incident in Tamil cinema that the producer of the film refused to release the film due to unsatisfactory final cut despite the completion of the film. The relaunched film ended up being directed by Gireesayya and titled Adithya Varma. It was released in 2019 to positive reviews, while Varmaa was released in 2020 and received negative reviews.

In 2022, Bala announced the launch of his film Vanangaan. Suriya was initially supposed to be the lead actor (reuniting with Bala after Pithamagan), producing the film under his banner 2D Entertainment. Krithi Shetty and Mamitha Baiju were the initial heroines for the film. Filming was initially planned to be completed entirely in three months; however, work on the film stopped in June due to a reported tiff between Suriya and Bala. Following this, Vanangaan was rumoured to have been dropped, which Suriya debunked with a social media post in which he stated that he was "waiting to be back on sets". However, in December, Bala announced that Suriya and 2D Entertainment were no longer part of the project, citing changes in the film's story. By March 2023, the film's new cast was confirmed to be Arun Vijay, Roshni Prakash, and Ridha. Vanangaan was released in 2025 and received negative reviews, criticizing the done-to-death plot of insensitively portraying sexual crimes against women.

== Personal life ==
Bala was born and brought up in Madurai. His father worked in a bank in Madurai and his mother was a homemaker. Bala graduated from American College with an aim to dive into the Tamil film industry. Bala married Muthumalar in 2004 and has a daughter. Bala and Muthumalar divorced in 2022, after 18 years of marriage.

== Public image ==
Shaji N. Karun, who headed the jury of the 56th National Film Awards, said, "Bala is unique in many ways. The way he changed Tamil cinema's character was commendable ... There were many who tried for a change. Among the new generation of filmmakers, Bala leads the pack in bringing a change in Tamil cinema's outlook and approach."

== Filmography ==
Year	Film	Credited as			Notes
Year	Film	Director	Writer	Producer	Notes
1999	Sethu	Yes	Yes	No	Tamil Nadu State Film Award for Best Director; Cinema Express Award for Best Director – Tamil; Filmfare Award for Best Director – Tamil; National Film Award for Best Feature Film in Tamil
2001	Nandhaa	Yes	Yes	No	Cinema Express Award for Best Director; Nominated, Filmfare Award for Best Director – Tamil
2003	Pithamagan	Yes	Yes	No	ITFA Best Director Award; Filmfare Award for Best Director – Tamil
2009	Naan Kadavul	Yes	Screenplay	No	National Film Award for Best Direction; Vijay Award for Best Director; Nominated, Filmfare Award for Best Director – Tamil
2011	Avan Ivan	Yes	Yes	No	
2013	Paradesi	Yes	Yes	Yes	South Indian Cinematographers Association Award for Best Director; Filmfare Award for Best Director – Tamil; Vijay Award for Best Director; SIIMA Award for Best Director – Tamil; Norway Tamil Film Festival Award for Best Director; Ananda Vikatan Cinema Award Best Director; Chennai International Film Festival Special Jury Award; Ananda Vikatan Cinema Award for Best Film; Norway Tamil Film Festival Award for Best Film
2016	Tharai Thappattai	Yes	Yes	Yes	
2018	Naachiyaar	Yes	Yes	Yes	
2020	Varmaa	Yes	No	No	
2025	Vanangaan	Yes	Yes	Yes	

=== As producer ===
Year	Film	Notes
2006	Maayavi	
2014	Pisaasu	
2015	Chandi Veeran	
2018	Naachiyaar	
2022	Visithiran	

=== As an actor ===
Year	Title	Role	Notes
1988	Veedu	Postman	Uncredited role
2011	Avan Ivan	Auto driver	Uncredited appearance
