= Arjun Reddy =

2017 Indian film by Sandeep Reddy Vanga

- Theatrical release poster
- Directed by: Sandeep Reddy Vanga
- Written by: Sandeep Reddy Vanga
- Produced by: Pranay Reddy Vanga
- Starring: Vijay Deverakonda; Shalini Pandey
- Cinematography: Raj Thota; Nagesh Banell
- Edited by: Shashank Mali
- Music by: Songs: Radhan; Score: Harshavardhan Rameshwar
- Production company: Bhadrakali Pictures
- Release date: 25 August 2017
- Running time: 182 minutes 220–260 minutes (Unreleased Director's cut)
- Country: India
- Language: Telugu
- Budget: ₹5–5.15 crore (Note: Jayakrishnan of The Times of India estimates the film's budget as ₹5 crore, whereas Sangeetha Devi Dundoo of The Hindu says that ₹5.15 crore was spent to produce the film.)
- Box office: ₹51 crore

Arjun Reddy is a 2017 Indian Telugu-language romantic drama film written and directed by Sandeep Reddy Vanga (in his directorial debut), and produced by his brother Pranay Reddy Vanga's company Bhadrakali Pictures. The film stars Vijay Deverakonda and Shalini Pandey while Rahul Ramakrishna, Jia Sharma, Sanjay Swaroop, Gopinath Bhat, Kamal Kamaraju and Kanchana appear in supporting roles. The film tells the story of Arjun Reddy Deshmukh (Deverakonda), a wealthy high-functioning alcoholic surgeon with anger management problems. Arjun is on a self-destructive path after the marriage of his girlfriend Preethi Shetty (Pandey); the film focuses on his downfall and subsequent resurgence.

Arjun Reddy was partially inspired by Sandeep Vanga's life as a physiotherapy student. He worked on the script for two years and it took four to five years for the film to materialise. Principal photography commenced on 20 June 2016 at Hyderabad and took 86 working days to complete. Other filming locations include Mangalore, Dehradun and New Delhi, filming also took place in Italy. Radhan and Harshvardhan Rameshwar composed the soundtrack and score, respectively. Raj Thota was director of photography and Shashank Mali edited the film.

Made on a budget of ₹5–5.15 crore; the film was released worldwide on 25 August 2017. It received widespread critical acclaim, but drew criticism for its themes of self destruction and substance abuse. The film was also a box office success, grossing ₹51 crore globally, with a distributor share of ₹25.5 crore.

It received six nominations at the 65th Filmfare Awards South, including Best Telugu Film and Best Telugu Director for Vanga; the film's only win was Best Telugu Actor for Deverakonda. The film was remade in Hindi as Kabir Singh (2019) and twice in Tamil: as Adithya Varma (2019) and Varmaa (2020).

== Plot ==
Arjun Reddy Deshmukh is a brilliant but volatile house surgeon at St. Mary's Medical College in Mangalore. Despite his academic excellence, his severe anger issues and impulsive behaviour earn him a fearsome reputation. After an inter-college football match ends in a violent brawl, the dean demands a public apology or threatens expulsion. Arjun initially chooses to withdraw, but changes his mind after meeting Preethi Shetty, an introverted first-year student. Immediately infatuated, he becomes intensely protective and possessive, managing her academic schedule and shielding her from harassment. Although initially intimidated, Preethi reciprocates his feelings, and they begin a passionate relationship. After earning his MBBS degree, Arjun moves to Mussoorie to study Orthopedic surgery, maintaining a committed long-distance relationship with Preethi for three years.

The relationship collapses when Arjun seeks Preethi's family's approval for marriage. Her father, Devdas Shetty, catches them together and opposes the match because of their cultural differences and Arjun's temperament. Despite his grandmother's advice to remain patient, Arjun gives Preethi six hours to leave her family and join him. When she fails to appear, he consumes a large quantity of sedatives and alcohol and becomes unconscious. During his 36-hour stupor, Preethi's family forces her into an arranged marriage. After waking, Arjun confronts her family violently, leading to his arrest and his subsequent banishment from the family home by his disgraced father, Dhanunjay Reddy.

Arjun's best friend, Shiva, helps him rebuild his life by arranging a private apartment and a position as a senior surgeon at a prominent corporate hospital. Consumed by heartbreak, Arjun develops a severe dependence on alcohol and illicit drugs and engages in casual sexual relationships. Despite his self-destructive lifestyle, his surgical skill remains exceptional, and he becomes the hospital's most prolific and respected surgeon. He begins a physical, transactional relationship with film actress Jia Sharma, but ends it when she develops genuine feelings for him, remaining devoted to Preethi.

Arjun's substance abuse eventually threatens his career when he collapses from intoxication while performing a critical operation. Although the patient survives, a medical inquiry is launched. Arjun refuses to conceal his addiction and admits to his substance abuse, resulting in a five-year suspension of his medical licence and eviction from his apartment. After his grandmother's sudden death, Shiva brings him home. Arjun reconciles with his grieving father, vows to reform, successfully overcomes his addictions, and takes a restorative solo holiday.

After returning to the city sober, Arjun encounters a visibly pregnant Preethi in a park. She explains that she never consummated her forced marriage, left her husband days after the wedding, and spent the intervening months working quietly at a clinic. She reveals that the child is Arjun's. After resolving their painful misunderstandings, they reunite and marry with the full support of Arjun's family. A remorseful Devdas also apologises for his past interference.

== Cast ==
- Vijay Deverakonda as Dr. Arjun Reddy Deshmukh
- Shalini Pandey as Dr. Preethi Shetty
- Jia Sharma as Jia Sharma
- Kanchana as Arjun's grandmother
- Sanjay Swaroop as Dhanunjay Reddy Deshmukh, Arjun's father
- Kamal Kamaraju as Gautham Reddy Deshmukh, Arjun's brother
- Bhushan Kalyan as Dean of St. Mary's College
- Priyadarshi Pulikonda as Vipul
- Rahul Ramakrishna as Dr.Shiva, Arjun's best friend
- Kalyan Subrahmanyam as Dr.Kamal, Arjun's friend
- Aditi Myakal as Dr.Vidya, Arjun's friend
- Anisha Alla as Dr.Keerthi, Arjun's friend
- Sandhya Janak as Arjun's mother
- Gopinath Bhat as Devdas Shetty, Preethi's father
- RJ Hemant as Shiva's future brother-in-law
- Amit Sharma as Amit, Arjun’s nemesis
- Sravya Mrudula as Dr.Shruthi, Preethi's friend

== Production ==
=== Development ===
Love stories are generally plot-driven, here it is driven by the character Arjun Reddy. It is a powerful name. During college years, you get to hear seniors talk about a legendary character and that name has a recall value. These days our Telugu film titles are lengthy and are from lyrics. I didn't want that. Arjun Reddy was thought to be a faction film. I am juxtaposing that connotation with a love story.

— Vanga on the film's title, in an interview with The Hindu in September 2016.

After discontinuing his studies as a physiotherapist, Sandeep Vanga worked in the 2010 Telugu film Kedi as an assistant director. He worked on the script of Arjun Reddy for two years and for four to five years approached producers who were not willing to finance the project until Vanga's brother Pranay Reddy agreed to do so. Pranay and Vanga's father invested in the film equally. The project was made under the production banner of Bhadrakali Pictures.

Arjun Reddy was partially inspired from Vanga's life as a physiotherapy student: "It is not my story but there are a lot of references from my life [...] Some of my medical college friends saw the film and said that Arjun reminds them of me." After working on a scene, he used to wait for a week as he believed that for a film with twists and turns, the narrative would have a chance to jump, thereby giving scope for cinematic liberties. For the same, whenever the idea for a plot twist came to him, Vanga used to work on it for three to four weeks.

In a September 2017 interview with Sangeetha Devi Dundoo of The Hindu, Vanga said he believed that Telugu cinema uses dialects spoken in Guntur and Vijayawada. Since he was unaware of the way of speaking in both the places, he wrote the dialogue in a Hyderabad Telangana accent. He made use of words that were rarely spoken in colloquial Telugu like yaralu (sister-in-law) to make Arjun look "real and rooted". Some of the dialogue was written in Tulu. With a dark mood prevailing for 100 minutes, Vanga wanted a happy ending for the film, with two or three options for the climax. He said he "didn't have the heart" to end the narrative on a sad note, considering the darkness Arjun was subjected to. The initial edit was 220 minutes long; this was reduced to 186 minutes.

=== Cast and crew ===
Vanga initially approached Sharwanand to play the film's lead role. Sharwanand was at first apprehensive of Vanga handling the responsibilities of directing and producing the project but after reading the script, he changed his mind. He sent the script to many producers, who considered the project too risky to fund. After Sharwanand left the project, Vanga signed Vijay Deverakonda to play Arjun Reddy. Deverakonda's breakthrough film Pelli Choopulu (2016) had not yet been released, and many were against Vanga for casting him, citing it a risky move for a home production. In an interview with Indo-Asian News Service, Devarakonda called the portrayal of Arjun Reddy exhausting, noting that, "I had to be constantly probing into the darkest areas of my consciousness, digging out feelings and tapping into emotions I had never touched in myself". He did not have any cinematic references but watched films like The Godfather (1972), Scarface (1983) and Goodfellas (1990) to remain in an alpha male zone.

Arjun and Preethi had an age difference of four years, which Vanga wanted to showcase effectively. He chose Shalini Pandey to play Preethi; she was pursuing a career in theatre in Jabalpur. Pandey's father was apprehensive of her signing a film contract; the shoot delayed by five months. Pandey was firm in her decision, which strained her relationship with her father. Vanga wanted her to dub for her role, to which she agreed because it would help her own the character completely. Vanga conducted an eight-day acting workshop with Deverakonda and Pandey. Kanchana was cast as Arjun's grandmother in November 2016; Arjun Reddy marked her comeback to Telugu cinema after Shri Datta Darshanam (1985). The producers persuaded her to join the project after a series of long discussions.

Rahul Ramakrishna, who worked as a lyricist for Pelli Choopulu, was cast as Arjun's friend Shiva. Ramakrishna's career as a journalist helped him understand several dialects, which in turn had a positive effect on his performance. He called Shiva's friendship with Arjun "loyal and unconditional", which gives them the liberty to deride each other at times. Amit Sharma was chosen after a three-hour audition; Vanga felt he "had the apt attitude and arrogance" for the role of Amit, Arjun's nemesis. Bhushan Kalyan played the role of the college's dean. Tulu actor Gopinath Bhat was cast as Preethi's father. Sanjay Swaroop, Kamal Kamaraju, Jia Sharma and Priyadarshi Pulikonda were cast in other important roles.

Nagesh Banell was initially the film's director of photography. He was replaced by Raj Thota later, who worked for 85% of the film. Deverakonda recommended him; he did the clash work for Pelli Choopulu whose cinematography was handled by Banell. (Note: Clash work is a practice of hiring a junior cinematographer when a film's director of photography handles other commitments simultaneously and is unavailable for the principal photography.) Vanga worked on the film's sound design and worked with Sachin Hariharan of Sync Cinema. Harshavardhan Rameshwar composed the background score. Shashank Mali edited the film.

=== Filming ===
Principal photography commenced in Hyderabad on 20 June 2016. Kanchana joined the film's sets on 30 November 2016. The protagonists' college life portions were filmed at the three heritage buildings of the university college of Hampankatta, Mangalore. Other filming locations included Dehradun and Delhi in India and parts of Italy. According to Deverakonda, Vanga wanted to set the film in a coastal city and chose Mangalore—mirroring his student life in Dharwad—and stayed there for ten days to finalise the locations. In an interview with Idlebrain.com, Vanga said, "When you write a script, you think about a particular location. But, it scared me when we got worst of locations for some of the scenes. But it didn't matter because our attention would be on characters. I realised that when content is clear, locations doesn't matter most of the times."

The principal photography was completed in 86 working days, and was made on a budget of ₹5–5.15 crore. Vanga preferred long, uninterrupted takes; the pre-Intermission sequence was seven minutes long. According to Deverakonda, if filmed in conventional style, Vanga would have finished the film in 200 working days. For a few scenes, Thota used a hand-held camera weighing 25 kilograms (55 lb), which adversely affected his hands. The classroom fight scene featuring Deverakonda, Pandey and Sharma was filmed in a single take; Sharma wanted Deverakonda to actually hit him to make the scene look natural. He said their experience in theatre helped their performances. The crew wanted to film the intermission scene, in which Arjun urinates in his pants, authentically but a delay in the shoot led to the insertion of a medical hosepipe in Deverakonda's trousers.

== Music ==
Radhan composed the film's six-song soundtrack, with lyrics written by Ananta Sriram, Rambabu Gosala, Shreshta and Mandela Pedaswamy. Harshavardhan Rameshwar, who would later collaborate with Vanga in all of his films, composed the background score. The soundtrack was preceded by four singles—"Mangaluru – Mussorie" (later known as "Dhooram"), "The Breakup Song" (later known as "Teliseney Na Nuvvey"), "Emitemito" and "Madhurame"—released on 23 April 19 June 10 and 31 July 2017, respectively. The soundtrack was released by Aditya Music on 21 August 2017.

== Release ==
Arjun Reddy was given an 'A' (adult) certificate by the Central Board of Film Certification due to the abundance of expletives and innuendoes. Vanga complained that the board took his creative struggle for granted. He considered writing a letter to the board asking what was taken into consideration before certification. The board complained that the producers of the film had not submitted their promotional material for censoring before using it. Asian Cinemas and KFC Entertainments acquired the film's distribution rights for Telangana and Andhra Pradesh. Nirvana Cinemas distributed the film in overseas markets. The teaser of the film was released on 27 February 2017, and the trailer was released on 12 August 2017.

Days before the film's release, Indian National Congress party's Rajya Sabha member V. Hanumantha Rao tore promotional posters featuring the lead pair kissing each other that had been pasted on TSRTC buses. He found them objectionable and said they adversely affected the minds of young people. It led the film's promoters to remove such posters across Telangana and Andhra Pradesh.

Arjun Reddy was released worldwide on 25 August 2017, notably clashing with Indian films Vivegam and A Gentleman. In Hyderabad, 55 paid premieres were held a day before the release, surpassing the record set by Baahubali 2: The Conclusion which had 33 premiere shows. The film's digital rights were acquired by Amazon Prime Video, which made it available online on the 50th day of theatrical release. Star Maa purchased the satellite rights for ₹3.5 crore. The film had its global television premiere on 21 January 2018, with a TRP rating of 13.6. The film was substantially edited for in its television premiere, drawing criticism from its audience.

In 2024, Vanga hinted at a possible release of the film's full version on its 10th anniversary.

== Reception ==
=== Box office ===
Arjun Reddy opened to a 100% occupancy in some areas of India, including districts of Telangana and Andhra Pradesh. At the United States box office, the film debuted with earnings of US$194,051 from its premieres and of US$709,347 in two days. By the end of its first weekend, it grossed US$954,677 in the US, and A$111,521 in Australia. Arjun Reddy grossed ₹19 crore globally, with a distributor share of ₹10.42 crore in its first weekend. The film was declared commercially successful as it earned a profit of 73.66% for its distributors. Arjun Reddy's earnings exceeded US$1 million on its fourth day of theatrical release in the US, becoming the 32nd Indian Telugu-language film to do so.

By the end of its first week, the film grossed ₹34.3 crore and a distributor share of ₹18.5 crore, providing a return of nearly 200% to its distributors. After earning US$1,681,996 in 17 days in the US, Arjun Reddy became the fourth highest grossing Telugu film of the year in that country. By then, it had grossed a worldwide total of ₹45 crore and a distributor share of ₹25 crore. In its complete global theatrical run, Arjun Reddy grossed a total of ₹51 crore and earned a distributor share of ₹26 crore.

=== Critical response ===
Arjun Reddy received highly positive reviews from critics. Writing for Film Companion, Baradwaj Rangan said that while the pre-interval sequences were generic, the "prickly" latter portions justified both the film's title and the running time. Rangan called Arjun Reddy a film that "digs deep [and] rings true" and said it "really comes into its own" in the second half. S. Shiva Kumar of The Hindu wrote that Vanga's storytelling had a "conviction and confidence probably only a debutante will have". He found the performances, especially those of Deverakonda and Kanchana, "pitch perfect". Sangeetha Devi Dundoo said the film is "too raw and real to be absolutely fictional" and commented: "Hours after watching Arjun Reddy, it’s hard to shake off its effect. It’s like a hangover, albeit in a good way."

Indo-Asian News Service gave the film five stars out of five, called it the "most original, experimental and daring work to come out Telugu cinema in a long time", and said the protagonist's "rise, fall and rise ... is nothing short of poetic and heart wrenching". Neeshita Nyayapati gave the film four stars out of five and commented: "With Arjun Reddy, Sandeep Vanga has managed to tell a story that is seldom told, without sleaze or cheesy lines or [over the top] drama". Srivatsan of India Today also gave the film four stars out of five and wrote: "Lo and behold, Arjun Reddy—the film and Vijay Deverakonda, is something that the Telugu industry deserved in the first place", and praised the "brutal and honest" filmmaking. Suresh Kavirayani of Deccan Chronicle also gave the film four stars out of five and commended the performances and the filmmaking but was apprehensive of the second half's pace. The Times of India, also gave four stars stating "Arjun Reddy is the dawn of a new era of films for the Telugu film industry."

Hemanth Kumar, in his review for Firstpost gave 3.75 stars out of five and praised the storytelling in particular, saying: "There are no gimmicks, no surprises, no twists. And in doing so, we are forced to absorb the film at a more personal and subconscious level." Latha Srinivasan, in her review for NewsX, wrote that the protagonist is "unconventional, free-spirited and tries to break the shackles of traditional societal norms". She said the romance is "rooted in deep emotions" and gave the film 3.5 stars out of five. Giving three stars out of five, K. Naresh Kumar of The Hans India was critical of the film's pace and a few subplots in the second half. He wrote: "As a tale of a love-struck man, who falters and finally figures out what is best for him, the experiment that the director undertakes is tedious, stretching out time and again". Murali Krishna CH, in his review for the Cinema Express, praised the unpredictability of the first half but was apprehensive of some emotional scenes in the second half; he found them a "serious flaw" after the intermission.

== Controversies ==
=== Toxic masculinity ===
The film has drawn criticism for its alleged misogyny and glorification of toxic masculinity. Sowmya Rajendran, in her review for The News Minute, panned its "utterly colourless" female characters and validation of abusive behaviour, writing: "The film treats women as property, to be under the protection and control of men ... [it] will have us believe that women have no opinions about anything that happens to them or around them." Malini Raghu of Deccan Herald concurred, stating: "portraying [Reddy] as just a wounded and short-tempered but affectionate boy is not acceptable to many [...] The female lead's gullibility is annoying, especially to women. All she does is keep mum and boost her man's ego." Vishnupriya Bhandaram of Firstpost found the film's depiction of misbehavior as an alpha male attribute to be "deeply problematic", while Sify's Ashley Tellis classified it as "part of the culture of misogyny that has always existed in Telugu (and Tamil and all Indian film cultures)." Speaking to The Asian Age, Neelima Menon opined that "it's problematic when you add celebratory background score to an act of verbally abusing a woman with sexually coloured remarks, or beating her up, or decide to make these acts sound heroic." Writing for Mashable, Pramit Chatterjee summed up the film as "the flag-bearer of 21st-century toxic masculinity".

In 2019, actress Parvathy criticised Arjun Reddy at a roundtable organised by Film Companion for glorifying misogyny, abuse and toxic masculinity in the films at International Film Festival of India (IFFI). Her comments against Arjun Reddy were met with widespread appreciation and criticism with many noting that she was brave enough to address the issue in front of Deverakonda. Later, Deverakonda criticised social media trollers during an interview for blowing the issue out of proportion while simultaneously emphasising on how much he respected Parvathy and her work. The main character was spoofed in the Malayalam film Super Sharanya.

=== Glorification of substance and sexual abuse ===
Post-release, Hanumantha Rao lodged a complaint against the film, stating that it promoted sexual abuse in colleges and substance abuse in hospitals. He also asked K. Chandrashekar Rao, the chief minister of Telangana, to stop the film's screening across the state. A week after the film's release, D. Nagaraju from Khammam accused the film's makers of plagiarising his script and demanded compensation of ₹2 crore. In Vijayawada, women's organisations held a protest against the film, complaining of its "objectionable" content that could have a negative impact on young people.

== Impact ==
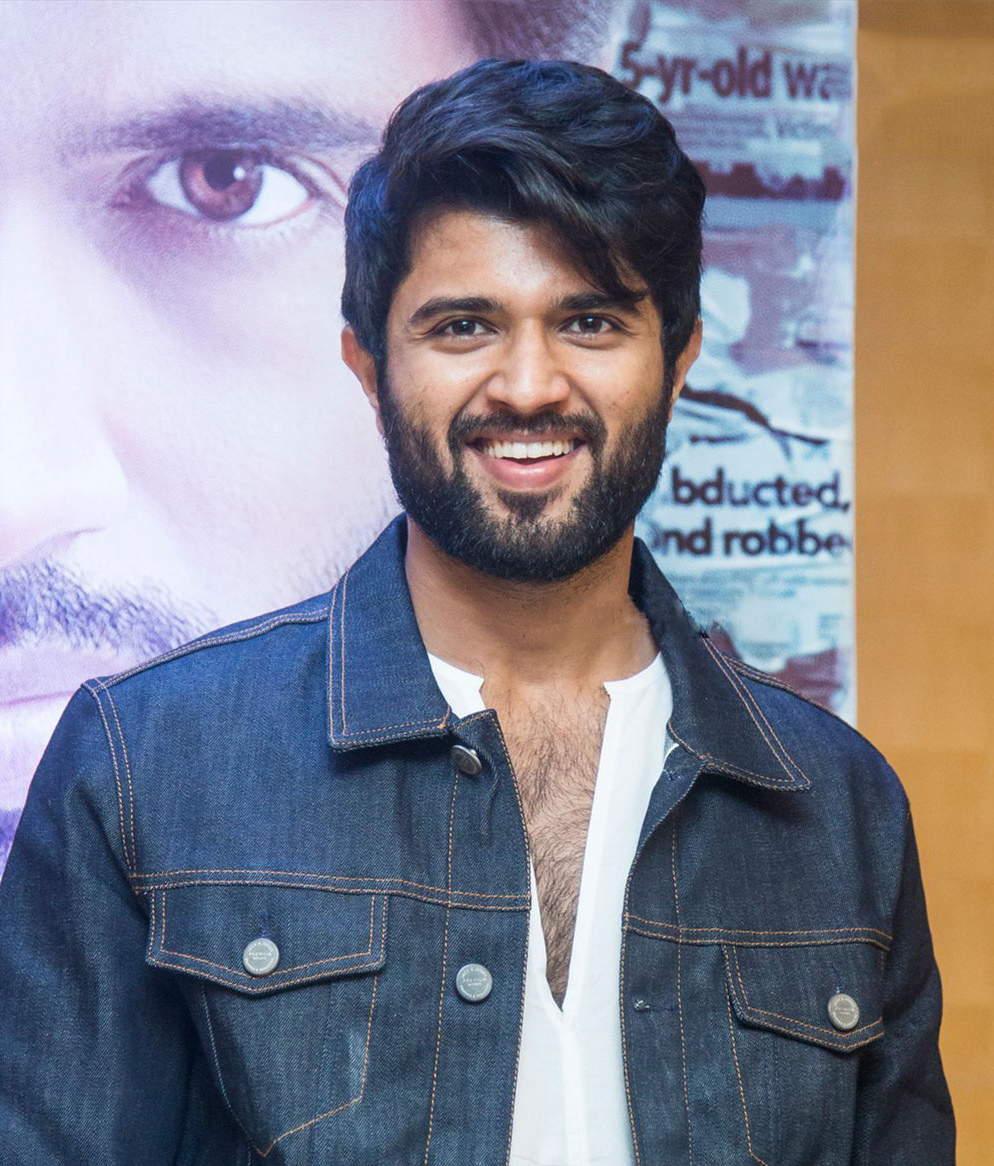
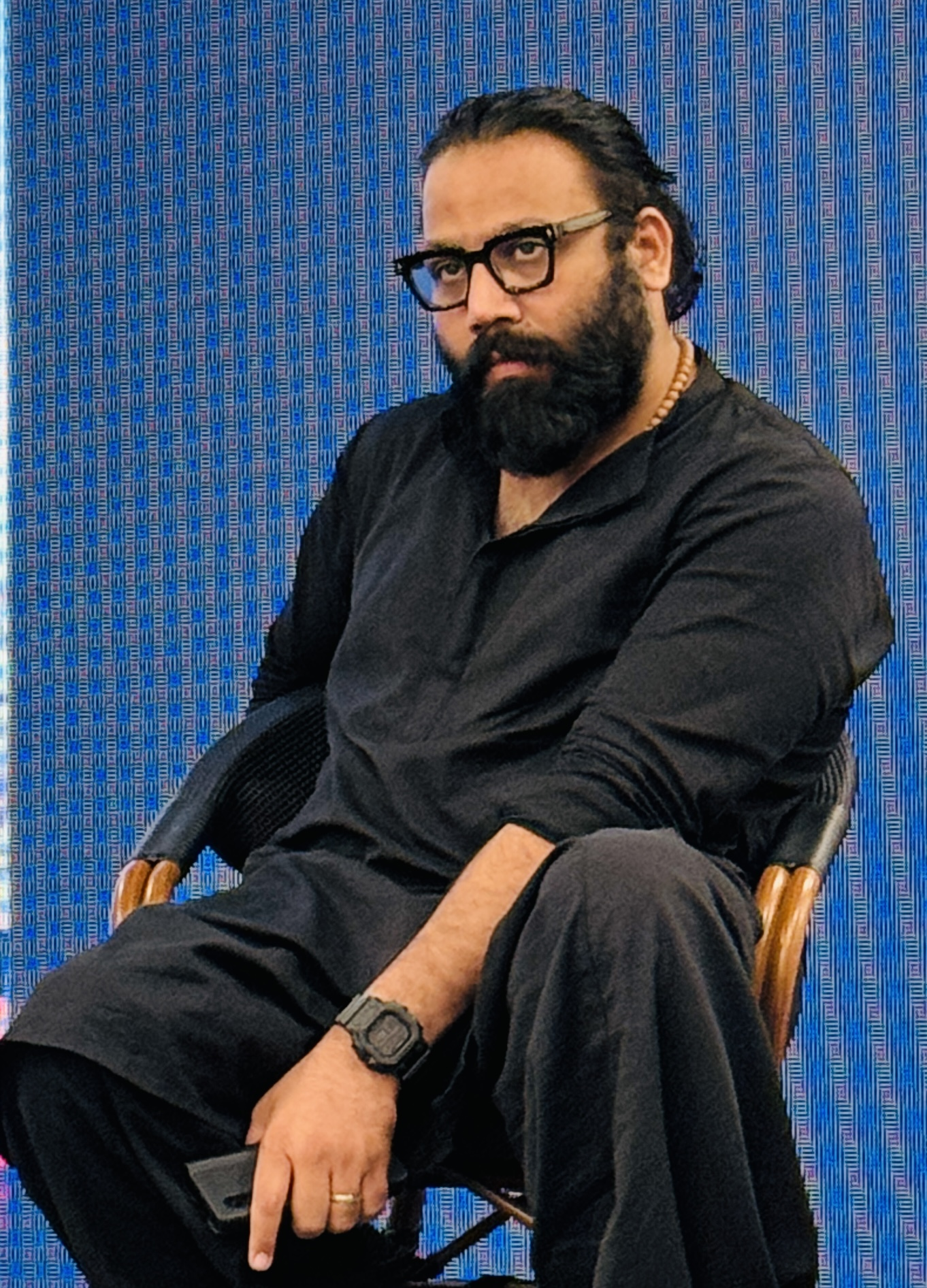
Critics heavily praised the performance of Vijay Deverakonda (left) and Sandeep Reddy Vanga's direction (right) in particular.

Arjun Reddy eventually gained huge popularity and was praised by many celebrities across Indian cinema. The film's success provided major breakthrough and elevated Devarakonda to superstardom and brought huge recognition for Sandeep Reddy Vanga and made him one of the most sought out film directors across Indian cinema. The film attained huge cult following among youth in Telugu cinema for its storytelling, characterisation, innovative screenplay and shotmaking techniques, and has been recognised by many to have introduced new style of filmmaking and has set standards for other Indian films, eventually making it a trendsetting and pathbreaking film.

== Accolades ==
Ceremony	Category	Nominee	Result	Ref.
Zee Cine Awards Telugu	Best Actor	Vijay Deverakonda	Won	
Zee Cine Awards Telugu	Best Debut Actress	Shalini Pandey	Won	
65th Filmfare Awards South	Best Film – Telugu	Bhadrakali Pictures - Arjun Reddy	Nominated	
65th Filmfare Awards South	Best Director – Telugu	Sandeep Vanga	Nominated	
65th Filmfare Awards South	Best Actor – Telugu	Vijay Deverakonda	Won	
65th Filmfare Awards South	Best Lyricist – Telugu	Shreshta (for "Madhurame")	Nominated	
65th Filmfare Awards South	Best Male Playback Singer – Telugu	L. V. Revanth (for "Teliseney Na Nuvvey")	Nominated	
65th Filmfare Awards South	Best Female Playback Singer – Telugu	Sameera Bharadwaj (for "Madhurame")	Nominated	
Sakshi Excellence Awards	Most Popular Actress of The Year	Shalini Pandey	Won	
7th South Indian International Movie Awards	Best Director (Telugu)	Sandeep Vanga	Nominated	
7th South Indian International Movie Awards	Best Actor (Telugu)	Vijay Deverakonda	Nominated	
7th South Indian International Movie Awards	Best Comedian (Telugu)	Rahul Ramakrishna	Won	
7th South Indian International Movie Awards	Best Female Debut (Telugu)	Shalini Pandey	Nominated	
7th South Indian International Movie Awards	Best Debut Director (Telugu)	Sandeep Vanga	Won	
16th Santosham Film Awards	Best Male Playback Singer	L. V. Revanth (for "Teliseney Na Nuvvey")	Won	
Zee Telugu Apsara Awards	Debut Heroine of the Year	Shalini Pandey	Nominated	
Zee Telugu Apsara Awards	Best Find of the Year	Shalini Pandey	Won	
49th Cinegoers Awards	Best Debut Director	Sandeep Vanga	Won	
49th Cinegoers Awards	Best Youth Icon Hero	Vijay Deverakonda	Won	
49th Cinegoers Awards	Best Debut Comedian	Rahul Ramakrishna	Won	

== Remakes ==
Arjun Reddy was remade in Hindi by Vanga himself as Kabir Singh, which was released on 21 June 2019. The film was first remade in Tamil by Bala as Varmaa; however in early 2019 the production company E4 Entertainment shelved the film's release due to creative differences with Bala, and relaunched the film as Adithya Varma with Gireesaaya directing, which was released on 21 November 2019. Despite initially being shelved, Varmaa was released on 6 October 2020. In June 2019, producer S. Narayan bought the Kannada remake rights of the film. E4 Entertainment also holds the rights to make a Malayalam version. In 2021, Yuva Films, a Nepali film production company was reported to be producing a Nepali version of Arjun Reddy.
