= Sandeep Reddy Vanga =

Indian filmmaker (born 1981)

- Vanga in 2026
- Born: Warangal, Telangana, India
- Occupations: Film director; screenwriter; film editor
- Years active: 2005–present
- Spouse: Manisha Reddy (m. 2014)
- Children: 2

Sandeep Reddy Vanga is an Indian filmmaker who works in Telugu and Hindi cinema. Vanga made his directorial debut with the 2017 Telugu-language romantic drama Arjun Reddy, a critical and commercial success. He also directed its 2019 Hindi-language remake, Kabir Singh, which became the highest-grossing A-rated Indian film of its time. Vanga's prominence increased with the Hindi-language action drama Animal (2023), which became the 10th highest-grossing Indian film and the highest-grossing A-rated Indian film of its time. For Animal, Vanga was nominated for Best Director, Best Screenplay writer and Best Editor at the 69th Filmfare Awards.

== Early life ==
Sandeep Reddy Vanga was born in a Telugu Reddy family, in Warangal, Telangana. He did his early schooling at Platinum Jubilee High School, Warangal, and moved to Hyderabad after class 8 standard for his further education. He earned a bachelor's degree in physiotherapy, and later went on to pursue filmmaking at an International Film School in Sydney, Australia.

== Career ==
=== 2005–2016: Early career ===
Vanga worked as an apprentice for the film Manasu Maata Vinadhu in 2005 for 25 days at Rushikonda Beach, Vizag. He worked for a few Tollywood films, including Kedi (2010) as an assistant director with Kiran Kumar and Malli Malli Idi Rani Roju (2015) as an associate director. He started writing the script of Arjun Reddy.

=== 2017–present: Breakthrough and recognition ===
Vanga started writing the script for Arjun Reddy in 2013 and finished it in two years. Producer Swapna Dutt and Sharwanand showed interest to produce and act in the film, however, it did not pan out as expected as Sharwanand had multiple projects in the queue at the time. He was introduced to Vijay Deverakonda by a common friend. He cast him as the lead for his directorial debut Arjun Reddy. The film was released on 25 August 2017 to critical acclaim and became a commercial success. It was produced on a minuscule budget of ₹4–5 crores, but went on to gross more than ₹50 crores (US$8 million) at the box office.

Vanga himself agreed to direct Kabir Singh (2019), the Hindi version remake of his debut Arjun Reddy (2017). Shahid Kapoor was signed in as the eponymous protagonist, while Kiara Advani was enlisted to play the female lead.

On 1 January 2021, Vanga's next directorial titled Animal, an action drama film starring Ranbir Kapoor, Anil Kapoor, Rashmika Mandanna and Bobby Deol was announced. It was produced by T-Series, Bhadrakhali Pictures, and Cine1Studios. Animal released on 1 December 2023, it made Vanga a household name in Telugu and Hindi cinema. Animal received mixed response from the critics, with praise going towards its performances, music, and technical aspects. The film was major commercial success, grossing over ₹900 crore (US$96 million) worldwide, becoming the third highest-grossing Indian film of 2023, the eighth highest-grossing Indian film, and the highest-grossing A-rated Indian film of all time. A sequel titled Animal Park was teased in the post-credits scene of the film, whose shooting will commence between 2026 and 2027.

Also in 2021, Vanga announced that he was set to work on the film Spirit, an action thriller film. Prabhas was confirmed as starring in an unspecified role. Deepika Padukone was initially set to also star, but was replaced by Tripti Dimri. Filming for Spirit began in November 2025.

== Filmmaking ==
Vanga's films are mostly character-driven, featuring antiheroes as the protagonists, along with dark psychological themes. He also gets the soundtrack composed before shooting his films. His debut film Arjun Reddy was described by The Times of India as a trendsetter which reinvented the love-tragedy genre. While making the action-drama Animal, Vanga cited the influence of The Godfather and Kill Bill. He himself considers Arjun Reddy and Kabir Singh love stories and Animal a family drama.

While Vanga's films have been commercially successful, they have been the subject of controversy for the inclusion and alleged glorification of misogynistic themes. For instance, scenes in Arjun Reddy and Animal have been faulted for normalizing toxic masculinity and violence against women, sparking widespread debates about the impacts of such portrayals on audiences. At the same time, he and his works have been defended by filmmakers such as Ram Gopal Varma, Anurag Kashyap, Vikram Bhatt, Sanjay Gupta and Mohit Suri as well as actresses Rashmika Mandanna, Tanishaa Mukerji, Sargun Mehta, Indira Krishnan, and Bhumi Pednekar. Kashyap in particular has remained vocal about defending him and Animal because he himself faced similar challenges following the release of his own films Dev.D, That Girl in Yellow Boots and Bombay Velvet.

== Personal life ==
Sandeep Reddy Vanga is married to Manisha Reddy. The couple has two kids, a daughter and a son in 2014. Vanga stated that he named his son, Arjun Reddy after the protagonist of his first film.

== Filmography ==
Key
†	Denotes films that have not yet been released

List of directorial feature films
Year	Title	Director	Writer	Editor	Language	Notes
2017	Arjun Reddy	Yes	Yes	No	Telugu	
2019	Kabir Singh	Yes	Yes	Yes	Hindi	
2023	Animal	Yes	Yes	Yes	Hindi	
2027	Spirit †	Yes	Yes	Yes	Telugu and Hindi	Filming

Acting roles

Year	Title	Role	Notes
2010	Kedi	Man on a boat	Uncredited
2018	Mahanati	Vedantam Raghavayya	
2023	Animal	Aziz Haque	Voice only
2026	ENE Repeat	Himself	

== Awards and nominations ==
List of Sandeep Reddy Vanga awards and nominations
Year	Ceremony	Category	Film	Result	Ref.
2018	7th South Indian International Movie Awards	Best Debut Director (Telugu)	Arjun Reddy	Won	
2018	7th South Indian International Movie Awards	Best Director (Telugu)	Arjun Reddy	Nominated	
2018	65th Filmfare Awards South	Best Director – Telugu	Arjun Reddy	Nominated	
2019	26th Screen Awards	Best Director	Kabir Singh	Nominated	
2019	21st IIFA Awards	Best Director	Kabir Singh	Nominated	
2024	69th Filmfare Awards	Best Film	Animal	Nominated	
2024	69th Filmfare Awards	Best Director	Animal	Nominated	
2024	69th Filmfare Awards	Best Screenplay	Animal	Nominated	
2024	69th Filmfare Awards	Best Editing	Animal	Nominated	
2024	24th IIFA Awards	Best Director	Animal	Nominated	
2024	24th IIFA Awards	Best Editing	Animal	Won	
