= List of accolades received by Mersal =

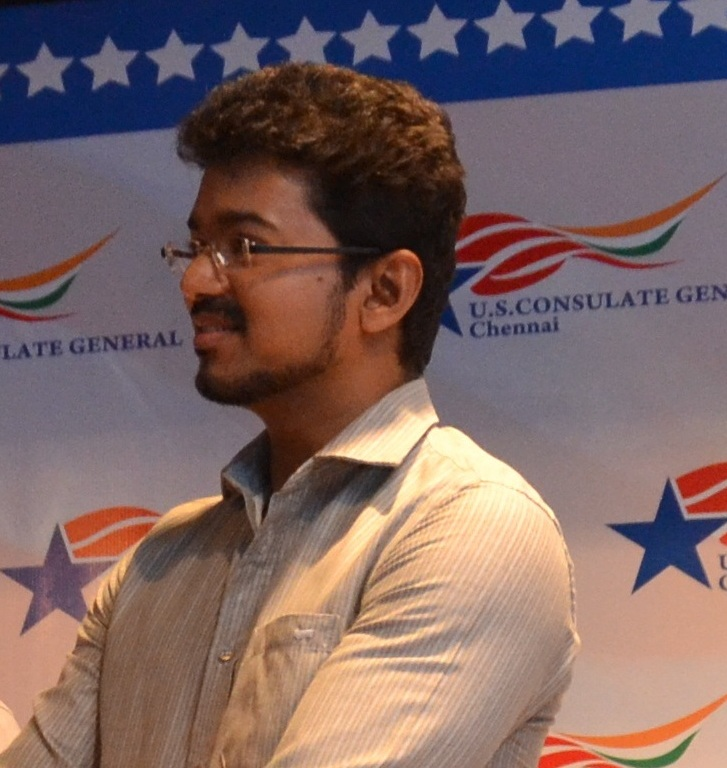
- Vijay garnered several awards and nominations for his performance as a father and his two sons in Mersal.
Accolades
Award	Wins	Nominations
Ananda Vikatan Cinema Awards	5	5
Edison Awards	7	7
Filmfare Awards South	2	11
National Film Awards UK	1	2
Norway Tamil Film Festival Awards	2	2
South Indian International Movie Awards	5	12
Techofes Awards	10	10
Vijay Awards	3	8
IARA Awards	1	1

Totals (Note: Certain award groups do not simply award one winner. They acknowledge several different recipients, have runners-up, and have third place. Since this is a specific recognition and is different from losing an award, runner-up mentions are considered wins in this award tally. For simplification and to avoid errors, each award in this list has been presumed to have had a prior nomination.)
- Wins: 36
- Nominations: 58

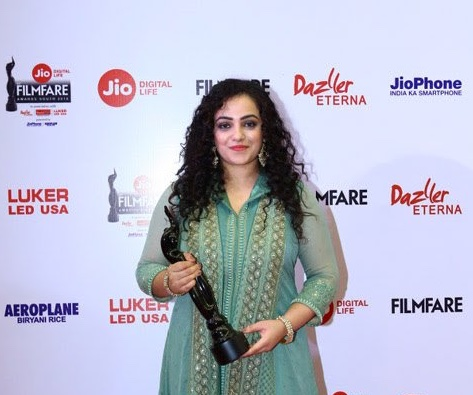
Nithya Menen at the 65th Filmfare Awards South ceremony.

Mersal (transl. Zapped) is a 2017 Indian vigilante action film directed by Atlee, who co-wrote the screenplay with V. Vijayendra Prasad and S. Ramana Girivasan. Produced by N. Ramasamy and Hema Rukmani under the banner of Thenandal Studio Limited, Mersal features Vijay in triple roles for the first time in his career. Nithya Menen, S. J. Surya, Kajal Aggarwal and Samantha Akkineni play the other lead roles while Vadivelu, Kovai Sarala and Sathyaraj feature as supporting characters. A. R. Rahman composed the film's soundtrack, while also handling the background score along with Qutub-E-Kripa. Ruben and G. K. Vishnu were in charge of the editing and cinematography respectively. The film follows two brothers, Vetri (Vijay), a renowned magician, and Maaran (Vijay), a doctor who charges meagre amounts for his patients, who try to expose the corrupt dealings and medical crimes of another doctor, Daniel Arockiaraj (Surya), who also happens to be the same person that killed their parents, Vetrimaaran (Vijay) and Aishwarya (Menen).

Produced on a budget of ₹1.2 billion (about US$17.5 million in 2017), Mersal was released on 18 October 2017 and received positive reviews. It was also a commercial success, grossing ₹2.6 billion (about US$39.3 million in 2017) worldwide. The film won 35 awards from 57 nominations; its direction, screenplay, music and Vijay's performances received the most attention from award groups.

Mersal received eleven nominations at the 65th Filmfare Awards South, including those for Best Director (Atlee), Best Actor (Vijay) and Best Supporting Actor (Surya). It won in two categories – Best Supporting Actress (Menen) and Best Music Director (Rahman). At the 10th Vijay Awards, it received eight nominations and won three, Favourite Film, Best Director and Favourite Song. Mersal received twelve nominations at the 7th South Indian International Movie Awards ceremony and won five awards, including Best Director for Atlee, Best Actor in a Negative Role for Surya and Best Music Director for Rahman. The film also received ten Techofes Awards, seven Edison Awards, five Ananda Vikatan Cinema Awards, two Norway Tamil Film Festival Awards, one award for Best Foreign Film at the National Film Awards UK and Best International actor award for Vijay at International Achievement Recognition Award UK.

== Awards and nominations ==
Award	Date of ceremony (Note: Date is linked to the article about the awards held that year, wherever possible.)	Category	Recipient(s)	Result	Ref.
Ananda Vikatan Cinema Awards	10 January 2018	Best Actor	Vijay	Won	
Ananda Vikatan Cinema Awards	10 January 2018	Best Actress	Kajal Aggarwal	Nominated	
Ananda Vikatan Cinema Awards	10 January 2018	Best Music Director	A. R. Rahman (Note: Also for Kaatru Veliyidai)	Won	
Ananda Vikatan Cinema Awards	10 January 2018	Best Playback Singer — Female	Shreya Ghoshal for "Neethane" (Note: Also for "Mazhaikulle" from Puriyatha Puthir)	Won	
Ananda Vikatan Cinema Awards	10 January 2018	Best Costume Designer	Neeraja Kona, Archa Mehta, Komal Shahani, Pallavi Singh, Jayalakshmi Sundaresan	Won	
Edison Awards	26 February 2018	Best Director	Atlee Kumar	Won	
Edison Awards	26 February 2018	Best Villain	S. J. Surya (Note: Also for Spyder)	Won	
Edison Awards	26 February 2018	Best Male Playback Singer	Sathyaprakash for "Aalaporaan Thamizhan"	Won	
Edison Awards	26 February 2018	Best Lyricist	Vivek	Won	
Edison Awards	26 February 2018	Best Choreographer	Shobi	Won	
Edison Awards	26 February 2018	Best Cinematographer	G. K. Vishnu	Won	
Edison Awards	26 February 2018	Best Art Director	T. Muthuraj	Won	
Filmfare Awards South	16 June 2018	Best Director – Tamil	Atlee Kumar	Nominated	
Filmfare Awards South	16 June 2018	Best Actor – Tamil	Vijay	Nominated	
Filmfare Awards South	16 June 2018	Best Supporting Actor – Tamil	S. J. Surya	Nominated	
Filmfare Awards South	16 June 2018	Best Supporting Actress – Tamil	Nithya Menen	Won	
Filmfare Awards South	16 June 2018	Best Music Director – Tamil	A. R. Rahman	Won	
Filmfare Awards South	16 June 2018	Best Male Playback Singer – Tamil	A. R. Rahman for "Neethane"	Nominated	
Filmfare Awards South	16 June 2018	Best Male Playback Singer – Tamil	Sid Sriram for "Macho"	Nominated	
Filmfare Awards South	16 June 2018	Best Female Playback Singer – Tamil	Shreya Ghoshal for "Neethane"	Nominated	
Filmfare Awards South	16 June 2018	Best Female Playback Singer – Tamil	Shweta Mohan for "Macho"	Nominated	
Filmfare Awards South	16 June 2018	Best Lyricist – Tamil	Vivek for "Aalaporaan Thamizhan"	Nominated	
Filmfare Awards South	16 June 2018	Best Lyricist – Tamil	Vivek for "Neethane"	Nominated	
National Film Awards UK	28 March 2018	Best Foreign Film	H. Murali, N. Ramasamy, Hema Rukmani	Won	
National Film Awards UK	28 March 2018	Best Supporting Actor	Vijay	Nominated	
Norway Tamil Film Festival Awards	26 January 2018	Best Lyricist	Vivek	Won	
Norway Tamil Film Festival Awards	26 January 2018	Best Playback Singer – Female	Shreya Ghoshal for "Neethane"	Won	
South Indian International Movie Awards	14 – 15 September 2018	Best Film	H. Murali, N. Ramasamy, Hema Rukmani	Nominated	
South Indian International Movie Awards	14 – 15 September 2018	Best Director	Atlee Kumar	Won	
South Indian International Movie Awards	14 – 15 September 2018	Best Actor	Vijay	Nominated	
South Indian International Movie Awards	14 – 15 September 2018	Best Actress	Nithya Menen	Nominated	
South Indian International Movie Awards	14 – 15 September 2018	Best Actor in a Negative Role	S. J. Surya	Won	
South Indian International Movie Awards	14 – 15 September 2018	Best Music Director	A. R. Rahman	Won	
South Indian International Movie Awards	14 – 15 September 2018	Best Lyricist	Vivek for "Aalaporaan Thamizhan"	Won	
South Indian International Movie Awards	14 – 15 September 2018	Best Male Playback Singer	A. R. Rahman for "Neethane"	Nominated	
South Indian International Movie Awards	14 – 15 September 2018	Best Male Playback Singer	Sid Sriram for "Macho"	Won	
South Indian International Movie Awards	14 – 15 September 2018	Best Female Playback Singer	Shreya Ghoshal for "Neethane"	Nominated	
South Indian International Movie Awards	14 – 15 September 2018	Best Comedian	Yogi Babu	Nominated	
South Indian International Movie Awards	14 – 15 September 2018	Best Cinematographer	G. K. Vishnu	Nominated	
Techofes Awards	19 February 2018	Best Film	H. Murali, N. Ramasamy, Hema Rukmani	Won	
Techofes Awards	19 February 2018	Best Director	Atlee Kumar	Won	
Techofes Awards	19 February 2018	Best Actor	Vijay	Won	
Techofes Awards	19 February 2018	Best Villain	S. J. Surya	Won	
Techofes Awards	19 February 2018	Best Male Playback Singer	Sathyaprakash for "Aalaporaan Thamizhan"	Won	
Techofes Awards	19 February 2018	Best Female Playback Singer	Pooja Vaidyanath for "Aalaporaan Thamizhan"	Won	
Techofes Awards	19 February 2018	Best Lyricist	Vivek	Won	
Techofes Awards	19 February 2018	Best Choreographer	Shobi	Won	
Techofes Awards	19 February 2018	Best Cinematographer	G. K. Vishnu	Won	
Techofes Awards	19 February 2018	Best Art Director	T. Muthuraj	Won	
Vijay Awards	3 June 2018	Best Dialogue	Atlee Kumar, S. Ramana Girivasan	Nominated	
Vijay Awards	3 June 2018	Best Male Playback Singer	A. R. Rahman for "Neethane"	Nominated	
Vijay Awards	3 June 2018	Best Female Playback Singer	Shreya Ghoshal for "Neethane"	Nominated	
Vijay Awards	3 June 2018	Best Lyricist	Vivek for "Aalaporaan Thamizhan"	Nominated	
Vijay Awards	3 June 2018	Best Cinematographer	G. K. Vishnu	Nominated	
Vijay Awards	3 June 2018	Favourite Film	H. Murali, N. Ramasamy, Hema Rukmani	Won	
Vijay Awards	3 June 2018	Favourite Director	Atlee Kumar	Won	
Vijay Awards	3 June 2018	Favourite Song	"Aalaporaan Thamizhan"	Won	
International Achievement Recognition Award UK(IARA UK)	International Achievement Recognition Award UK - 2018	Best International Actor	Vijay	Won	

== See also ==
- List of Tamil films of 2017
