= List of accolades received by Vikram Vedha =

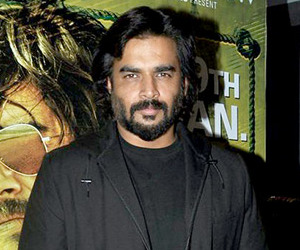
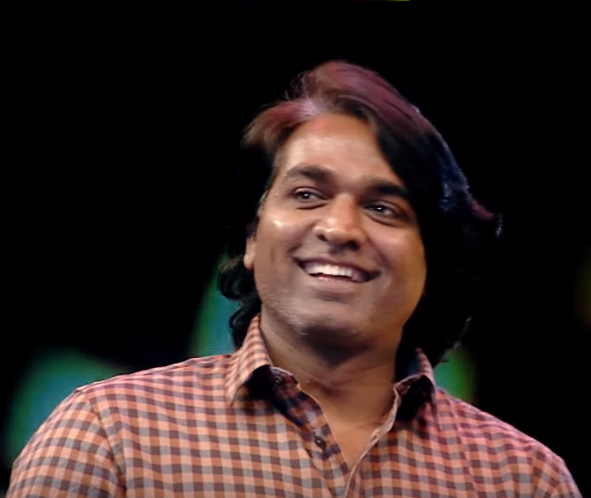
- R. Madhavan and Vijay Sethupathi garnered several awards and nominations for their performances in Vikram Vedha.
Accolades
Award	Wins	Nominations
Ananda Vikatan Cinema Awards	3	3
Edison Awards	1	1
Filmfare Awards South	4	7
Norway Tamil Film Festival Awards	4	4
South Indian International Movie Awards	2	10
Techofes Awards	2	6
Vijay Awards	4	15

Totals (Note: Certain award groups do not simply award one winner. They acknowledge several different recipients, have runners-up, and have third place. Since this is a specific recognition and is different from losing an award, runner-up mentions are considered wins in this award tally. For simplification and to avoid errors, each award in this list has been presumed to have had a prior nomination.)
- Wins: 19
- Nominations: 46

Vikram Vedha is a 2017 Indian Tamil-language neo-noir action thriller film directed and written by the husband-and-wife duo Pushkar–Gayatri and produced by S. Sashikanth under the banner of YNOT Studios. R. Madhavan and Vijay Sethupathi play the title characters Vikram and Vedha respectively. Shraddha Srinath, Kathir and Varalaxmi Sarathkumar play the other lead roles while Prem, Achyuth Kumar, Hareesh Peradi and Vivek Prasanna feature as supporting characters. Sam C. S. composed the film's soundtrack and score. Richard Kevin and P. S. Vinod was in charge of the editing and cinematography respectively.

A contemporary adaptation of the Indian folktale Baital Pachisi, the film follows Vikram, a police inspector who is decisive about good and evil, and the head of an encounter unit which is formed to track down and kill Vedha, a gangster. When the unit makes plans for another encounter, Vedha walks into the police station and voluntarily surrenders himself. He then tells Vikram three stories which bring about a change in the latter's perceptions of right and wrong.

Produced on a budget of ₹110 million (about US$1.7 million in 2017), Vikram Vedha was released on 21 July 2017 and received positive reviews. It was commercially successful, grossing ₹600 million (about US$9.0 million in 2017) worldwide. The film won 19 awards from 46 nominations; its direction, screenplay, music, and the performances of Madhavan, Sethupathi and Varalaxmi have received the most attention from award groups.

Vikram Vedha received seven nominations at the 65th Filmfare Awards South, including those for Best Film (Sashikanth), Best Actor (Madhavan and Sethupathi) and Best Supporting Actress (Varalaxmi). It won in four categories – Best Director (Pushkar–Gayatri), Best Actor (Sethupathi), Best Male Playback Singer (Anirudh for "Yaanji") and Critics Award for Best Actor – South (Madhavan). At the 10th Vijay Awards, it received fifteen nominations and won four, Best Director, Best Screenplay Writer, Best Actor and Best Background Score. Vikram Vedha received ten nominations at the 7th South Indian International Movie Awards ceremony and won two awards, which were Best Director for Pushkar–Gayathri and Best Actor for Madhavan. Among other wins, the film received four Norway Tamil Film Festival Awards, three Ananda Vikatan Cinema Awards, two Techofes Awards, an Edison Award and four Tamil Nadu State Film Awards.

== Awards and nominations ==
Award	Date of ceremony (Note: Date is linked to the article about the awards held that year, wherever possible.)	Category	Recipient(s)	Result	Ref.
Ananda Vikatan Cinema Awards	10 January 2018	Best Screenplay	Pushkar–Gayathri	Won	
Ananda Vikatan Cinema Awards	10 January 2018	Best Playback Singer — Male	Anirudh Ravichander (for "Yaanji") (Note: Also for "Karuthavanlaam Galeejam" from Velaikkaran)	Won	
Ananda Vikatan Cinema Awards	10 January 2018	Best Villain — Male	Vijay Sethupathi	Won	
Edison Awards	26 February 2018	Best Character Role – (Female)	Varalaxmi Sarathkumar	Won	
Filmfare Awards South	16 June 2018	Best Film – Tamil	S. Sashikanth	Nominated	
Filmfare Awards South	16 June 2018	Best Director – Tamil	Pushkar–Gayathri	Won	
Filmfare Awards South	16 June 2018	Best Actor – Tamil	R. Madhavan	Nominated	
Filmfare Awards South	16 June 2018	Best Actor – Tamil	Vijay Sethupathi	Won	
Filmfare Awards South	16 June 2018	Best Supporting Actress – Tamil	Varalaxmi Sarathkumar	Nominated	
Filmfare Awards South	16 June 2018	Best Male Playback Singer – Tamil	Anirudh Ravichander (for "Yaanji")	Won	
Filmfare Awards South	16 June 2018	Critics Best Actor – Tamil	R. Madhavan (Note: Shared with Karthi for Theeran Adhigaaram Ondru)	Won	
Norway Tamil Film Festival Awards	26 January 2018	Best Screenplay	Pushkar–Gayathri	Won	
Norway Tamil Film Festival Awards	26 January 2018	Best Actor – Male	R. Madhavan	Won	
Norway Tamil Film Festival Awards	26 January 2018	Best Music Director	Sam C. S.	Won	
Norway Tamil Film Festival Awards	26 January 2018	Best Playback Singer – Male	Anirudh Ravichander (for "Yaanji")	Won	
South Indian International Movie Awards	14 – 15 September 2018	Best Film – Tamil	S. Sashikanth	Won	
South Indian International Movie Awards	14 – 15 September 2018	Best Director – Tamil	Pushkar–Gayathri	Nominated	
South Indian International Movie Awards	14 – 15 September 2018	Best Actor – Tamil	R. Madhavan	Nominated	
South Indian International Movie Awards	14 – 15 September 2018	Best Actor – Tamil	Vijay Sethupathi	Nominated	
South Indian International Movie Awards	14 – 15 September 2018	Best Supporting Actress – Tamil	Varalaxmi Sarathkumar (Note: Also for Nibunan)	Nominated	
South Indian International Movie Awards	14 – 15 September 2018	Best Actor (Critics) – Tamil	R. Madhavan	Won	
South Indian International Movie Awards	14 – 15 September 2018	Best Debut Actress – Tamil	Shraddha Srinath	Nominated	
South Indian International Movie Awards	14 – 15 September 2018	Best Music Director – Tamil	Sam C. S.	Nominated	
South Indian International Movie Awards	14 – 15 September 2018	Best Male Playback Singer – Tamil	Anirudh Ravichander (for "Yaanji")	Nominated	
South Indian International Movie Awards	14 – 15 September 2018	Best Female Playback Singer – Tamil	Shakthisree Gopalan (for "Yaanji")	Nominated	
Tamil Nadu State Film Awards	29 January 2026	Best Film (Second Prize)	Vikram Vedha	Won	
Tamil Nadu State Film Awards	29 January 2026	Best Director	Pushkar–Gayatri	Won	
Tamil Nadu State Film Awards	29 January 2026	Best Playback Singer (Female)	Shakthisree Gopalan	Won	
Tamil Nadu State Film Awards	29 January 2026	Best Stunt Coordinator	Dhilip Subbarayan	Won	
Techofes Awards	19 February 2018	Best Director	Pushkar–Gayathri	Nominated	
Techofes Awards	19 February 2018	Best Story	Pushkar–Gayathri	Won	
Techofes Awards	19 February 2018	Best Actor	Vijay Sethupathi	Nominated	
Techofes Awards	19 February 2018	Best Supporting Actress	Varalaxmi Sarathkumar	Nominated	
Techofes Awards	19 February 2018	Best Music Director	Sam C. S.	Won	
Techofes Awards	19 February 2018	Best Lyricist	Vignesh Shivan (for "Karuppu Vellai")	Nominated	
Vijay Awards	3 June 2018	Best Film	S. Sashikanth	Nominated	
Vijay Awards	3 June 2018	Best Director	Pushkar–Gayathri	Won	
Vijay Awards	3 June 2018	Best Screenplay Writer	Pushkar–Gayathri	Won	
Vijay Awards	3 June 2018	Best Dialogue	Manikandan	Nominated	
Vijay Awards	3 June 2018	Best Actor	Vijay Sethupathi	Won	
Vijay Awards	3 June 2018	Best Actress	Shraddha Srinath	Nominated	
Vijay Awards	3 June 2018	Best Supporting Actress	Varalaxmi Sarathkumar	Nominated	
Vijay Awards	3 June 2018	Best Music Director	Sam C. S.	Nominated	
Vijay Awards	3 June 2018	Best Background Score	Sam C. S.	Won	
Vijay Awards	3 June 2018	Best Stunt Director	Dhilip Subbarayan	Nominated	
Vijay Awards	3 June 2018	Best Art Director	Vinoth Rajkumar	Nominated	
Vijay Awards	3 June 2018	Best Editor	Richard Kevin	Nominated	
Vijay Awards	3 June 2018	Best Cinematographer	P. S. Vinod	Nominated	
Vijay Awards	3 June 2018	Favourite Film	S. Sashikanth	Nominated	
Vijay Awards	3 June 2018	Favourite Director	Pushkar–Gayathri	Nominated	

== See also ==
- List of Tamil films of 2017
