= Mersal =

2017 Indian film directed by Atlee

- Theatrical release poster
- Directed by: Atlee
- Screenplay by: V. Vijayendra Prasad; S. Ramana Girivasan
- Produced by: N. Ramasamy; Hema Rukmani; N. Murali
- Starring: Vijay; S. J. Suryah; Kajal Aggarwal; Samantha Ruth Prabhu; Nithya Menen
- Cinematography: G. K. Vishnu
- Edited by: Ruben
- Music by: A. R. Rahman
- Production company: Thenandal Studio Limited
- Distributed by: Sri Thenandal Films
- Release date: 18 October 2017 (India)
- Running time: 163 minutes
- Country: India
- Language: Tamil
- Budget: ₹120 crore
- Box office: est. ₹250 crore (Note: Mersal's reported worldwide gross is ₹250 crore according to India Today, Deccan Chronicle, and The News Minute.)

Mersal (transl. Zapped) is a 2017 Indian Tamil-language action thriller film directed by Atlee and produced by Thenandal Studio Limited, in the studio's hundredth film production. The film stars Vijay in triple roles (father and twin sons), alongside S. J. Suryah, Kajal Aggarwal, Samantha Ruth Prabhu, Nithya Menen, Vadivelu, Hareesh Peradi, Kovai Sarala, Sathyan and Sathyaraj. It is the second of three collaborations between Vijay and Atlee, before they began working with others. The film follows Maaran, a reputed doctor who charges meagre amounts from his patients and leads a double life as a vigilante magician fighting medical crimes. After he is arrested, his past is revealed.

The film was officially announced in October 2016; its principal photography commenced on 1 February 2017 in Chennai and was completed in June 2017 within 130 working days. Filming took place in Gdańsk, Poland and Jaisalmer, Rajasthan. The background score and soundtrack album were composed by A. R. Rahman, while the cinematography was done by G. K. Vishnu and edited by Ruben.

Mersal was released worldwide on 18 October 2017, coinciding with Diwali. The film received mostly positive reviews; critics praised the performances of the main cast, A. R. Rahman's soundtrack, the cinematography, the social message, and Atlee's direction, though they criticised the cliched plot and excessive length. Recipient of various accolades, the film was a commercial success, grossing ₹200 crore (US$21 million)–₹260 crore (US$27 million) worldwide, becoming the highest-grossing film in Vijay's career at that time as well as one of the highest-grossing Tamil films. The film completed its 100-day theatrical run on 25 January 2018. The film was released on 6 December 2018 in China by HGC Entertainment. Due to high demand, the film was screened at the Grand Rex in France, the largest cinema theatre in Europe. The film was screened at the Hainan International Film Festival in Hainan, China and at the Bucheon International Fantastic Film Festival in South Korea.

== Plot ==
A series of abductions of medical staff occurs at dawn: an ambulance driver, a medical broker, a hospital worker, and a surgeon. The abductions are traced to Maaran. Maaran is arrested and interrogated by DCP Ratnavel "Randy".

A flashback reveals that Maaran is a doctor who takes only 5 rupees for treatment and has a huge following in his home city of Chennai, leading to him receiving an award in Paris from Dr. Arjun Zachariah.

During his days in Paris, Maaran is also shown to be a magician. He meets Pallavi, a doctor from India and Arjun Zachariah's assistant, and they soon fall in love. He soon conducts a magic show in Paris, in which he kills Arjun Zachariah. This case is being investigated by DCP Ratnavel "Randy". Daniel Arokiaraj, another corrupt doctor, arrives at the scene of the murder, threatening Randy to find out who killed his friend. Maaran comes back to Chennai. He soon meets Tara, a news reporter, and they fall in love.

In the present, Maaran reveals the reasons for the abductions. Maaran explains that the four were responsible for the death of an auto driver's daughter and the suicide of his wife due to their greed for money and negligence in providing proper healthcare. He then gives Randy the locations of his hostages but asserts that if they reach the hospital in time, they will survive, like the auto driver's daughter. However, the police find them dead.

Back in the past, Daniel sees Maaran's inexpensive healthcare as a threat to his hospital business. He decides to kill Maaran using his goons. That night, Maaran is beaten up by goons, but is saved by his doppelgänger Vetri. It is then disclosed that the crimes were committed by Vetri, proving that the magician (Vetri) and the doctor (Maaran) are different people. In the present, the person arrested is Vetri, who had kidnapped Maaran after rescuing him. He escapes using his magic tricks, while Maaran is rescued at that same time.

Vetri and Pallavi soon reconcile. Meanwhile, Maaran's family and girlfriend Tara are kidnapped by Daniel, who demands and asks him for Vetri. Randy and his assistant then interrogate Salim Ghosh, a famous magician, who is revealed to be Vetri's father. Soon that same night, Maaran finds Vetri's hideout and confronts both Vetri and Vadivu. He constantly demands to know who Vetri is, prompting Vadivu to intervene and tell Maaran about his real identity.

Past: Maaran and Vetri are the sons of Aishwarya "Aishu" and Vetrimaaran, an altruistic village wrestler and chieftain in the 1970s. Vetrimaaran builds a temple in his area and holds a grand festive event. However, a fire breaks out, injuring many and killing two children. On the advice of Aishu, Vetrimaaran establishes a hospital in his village, appointing Daniel and Arjun as the chief doctors under the assumption that they are good-hearted. However, it's soon revealed that Daniel and Arjun are money-minded misanthropists and perform a Caesarean section on Aishu when she is in labour with her second child (Vetri) to extract more money from Vetrimaaran, though the child could undergo a normal delivery.

With an overdose of anaesthesia and loss of blood, Aishu dies while the child is declared stillborn. When Vetrimaaran learns about this, he is enraged that they deceived them and tries to confront Daniel. During the confrontation at the hospital, Maaran is struck by a glass bottle, falls unconscious, and loses his memory. Vetrimaaran, though under attack himself, manages to place Maaran safely in a truck before Daniel's men throw the seemingly stillborn Vetri into a dump. Vetrimaaran fights Daniel's henchmen while gravely injured but gets stabbed by Daniel who reveals that he only caused the fire accident and Vetrimaaran swears that he will pay for the misdeeds before dying. However, just before dying, he amputates the arm of Daniel's henchman, Kasi. Daniel and Arjun embezzle money from the medical services to consolidate their dictatorship over the years. Soon, Vetri miraculously survives, and their paternal uncle, Vadivu, takes care of him. Salim Ghosh then adopts Vetri and Vadivu who found them when he returned home after his magic show performance in Dindigul. Vetri soon learns all the magic tricks from Salim Ghosh to exact vengeance. Maaran is found by Sarala who adopted him.

Present: Upon learning about his past, Maaran reconciles with Vetri, and they swap places. Vetri (who is Maaran) is in custody, and Daniel meets him in prison and contemplates misusing the medical industry for his gains. Meanwhile, Daniel's nephew, Sesha, tries to make a deal with Maaran (revealed to be Vetri) to shut down his practice. However, when they both learn the truth, Vetri slits Sesha's hand. Daniel rushes to Vetri's hideout, where Vetri defeats his henchmen and injures Daniel. Though Vetri is critically wounded in the process and nearly dies, Maaran revives him via CPR. However, Maaran revives Vetri via CPR. In a fight, Maaran kills Kasi, and Vetri brutally electrocutes Daniel, killing him. Later, the police arrest Vetri for his role in the murders. Before leaving, Vetri gives a press conference justifying his actions by exposing corrupt medical practices and the embezzlement of money in the field. Maaran becomes the head of the Indian Medical Council. One day in prison, Vetri watches a news report in which, despite his efforts, another young girl dies from medical negligence. On hearing this, Vetri escapes using his magic tricks and continues his mission.

== Cast ==
- Vijay in a triple role as:
  - Vetrimaaran (Thalapathy), a village wrestler, Aishwarya's husband, Maaran and Vetri's biological father
  - Dr Maaran: a doctor; Aishwarya and Vetrimaaran's elder son,and Vetri's elder brother.
    - Akshath Das as Young Maaran
  - Vetri: a magician; Aishwarya and Vetrimaaran's younger son, and Maaran's younger brother.
- S. J. Suryah as Dr Daniel Arokiyaraj
- Kajal Aggarwal as Dr Anu Pallavi (voiceover by Deepa Venkat), Vetri's love interest
- Samantha Ruth Prabhu as Tara, a media reporter and Maaran's fiancée
- Nithya Menen as Aishwarya "Aishu" Vetrimaaran, Vetrimaaran's wife, Maaran and Vetri's biological mother
- Vadivelu as Vadivu, Vetri's assistant and Maaran's compounder (their paternal uncle) and Vetrimaaran's younger brother
  - Raj Manickam as young Vadivu
- Kovai Sarala as Sarala, Maaran's adoptive mother
- Sathyan as Maniya, Randy's assistant
- Rajendran as Tamil Nadu Health Minister
- Yogi Babu as Nolan, Tara's friend
- Kaali Venkat as Poongodi's father, an auto driver
- Hareesh Peradi as Dr Arjun Zachariah, Daniel's friend
- Devadarshini as a nurse
- Surekha Vani as a nurse
- Misha Ghoshal as Tara's friend
- Abdool Lee as Vetrimaaran's friend
- Shivani Murali as Paapu, Anu Pallavi's friend
- Sathyaraj as DCP Rathnavel "Randy" IPS
- Sangili Murugan as Salim Ghosh, a magician, Vetri and Vadivu's adoptive father
- Pasanga Sivakumar as the hospital HR
- Telephone Raj as a pharmacy worker
- M. Kamaraj as Kasi, Daniel's henchman
- Bharath Raj as Sesha, Daniel's nephew
- Senthi Kumari as Selvi
- Priya as Tara's mother
- Seeni Amma as Chitti Kuruvi
- Parithabangal Gopi as a show host
- Parithabangal Sudhakar as a show contestant
- Thavasi as a priest
- Sai Dheena as a prisoner
- Poo Ramu as a victim's father
- Pandian as a police officer
- Marianna Mehring-Steinborn as an airport passenger
- Michał Zacharek as a doctor

== Production ==
=== Development ===
Following the release of Atlee's Theri, with Vijay in the lead, the pair was signed by Sri Thenandal Films for another project together in September 2016. Initially, reports surfaced that Atlee will be directing Mahesh Babu after Theri, and was developing the script for the past seven months which did not happen; Similarly, Vijay too being signed for Sangamithra produced by Thenandal Films, but as the film demanded 250 days of the schedule which he could not afford, he politely declined the offer. It was reported that the film will begin production only after the release of Vijay's Bairavaa. In October 2016, Safwan Saleem, the chief executive officer of the production house, confirmed the project; and further announced that writer V. Vijayendra Prasad, who had earlier worked in films like the Baahubali series and Bajrangi Bhaijaan will be a part of the technical team.

The film featured Vijay playing triple role for the first time in his career, as a doctor, magician and a head of panchayat in the film. A report from Deccan Chronicle said that: "The actor’s comic timing will be brought on screen through the magician’s role. His portions are intended to evoke laughter and lighten up the mood." The report further denied claims that Vijay will play a Sikh in the film. Vijay learnt a few magic tricks in preparation for his role as the magician. He learnt the magic tricks from three magicians: Gogo Requiem from the Republic of Macedonia, Raman Sharma from Canada, and Dani Belev from Bulgaria.

Hema Rukmani, CEO of Sri Thenandal Films announced that the film would be the 100th production of the company, instead of Sangamithra; On 21 April 2017, the producers announced that the film would be launched under their newly renamed banner Thenandal Studio Limited and also announcing a release date of October 2017. At the first look launch of Sangamithra at the Cannes Film Festival, Hema Rukmani said that "Most people look at Vijay as a 'mass actor.' But, I've seen him perform. He's an outstanding actor". She added, "I've noticed a lot of things during shooting. His sense of continuity is brilliant. He will know even the minutest details like where and how he kept his hand or leg during a particular shot. Whether the assistant director remembers or not, he will know. I had the great joy of watching him improvise". The production of the film began without announcing a title; on 21 June 2017, the makers announced the title as Mersal and also released the first look poster of the film.

=== Casting ===
In December 2016, actresses Jyothika, Kajal Aggarwal and Samantha Ruth Prabhu were announced as the female leads for the film. (Note: Jyothika, Samantha Akkineni, and Kajal Aggarwal earlier collaborated with Vijay in two films.) However, the production team later revealed that Jyothika opted out of the film due to unavoidable reasons and the role went to Nithya Menen in her first collaboration with Vijay. In January 2017, A. R. Rahman was reported to compose the film's background score and soundtrack album, collaborating with Vijay after ten years since Azhagiya Thamizh Magan (2007). Actors S. J. Suryah and Sathyaraj also joined the cast as supporting actors, the former in a negative role with two looks in the film. Vadivelu who eventually wanted to act with Vijay in Theri, missed the role due to unavoidable reasons. He was later announced as a part of this project. Other comedians Kovai Sarala, Sathyan and Rajendran also joined the film.

Atlee's usual cinematographer George C. Williams, who worked on Raja Rani and Theri, was supposed to work on this film too, but was unable to do so due to scheduling conflicts with another project. Later, newcomer G. K. Vishnu, an erstwhile assistant of Richard M. Nathan, was signed for the project. The official cast and crew members working on the film, were announced by Thenandal Films in January 2017, with Anal Arasu as the action choreographer, Ruben who worked with Atlee in his previous projects as the film's editor; T. Muthuraj as the production designer; Shobi and Prem Rakshith as dance choreographers, Neeraja Kona and Komal Shahani as the costume designers. During the film's production, Hareesh Peradi, Yogi Babu and Cheenu Mohan joined the film's cast.

=== Filming ===
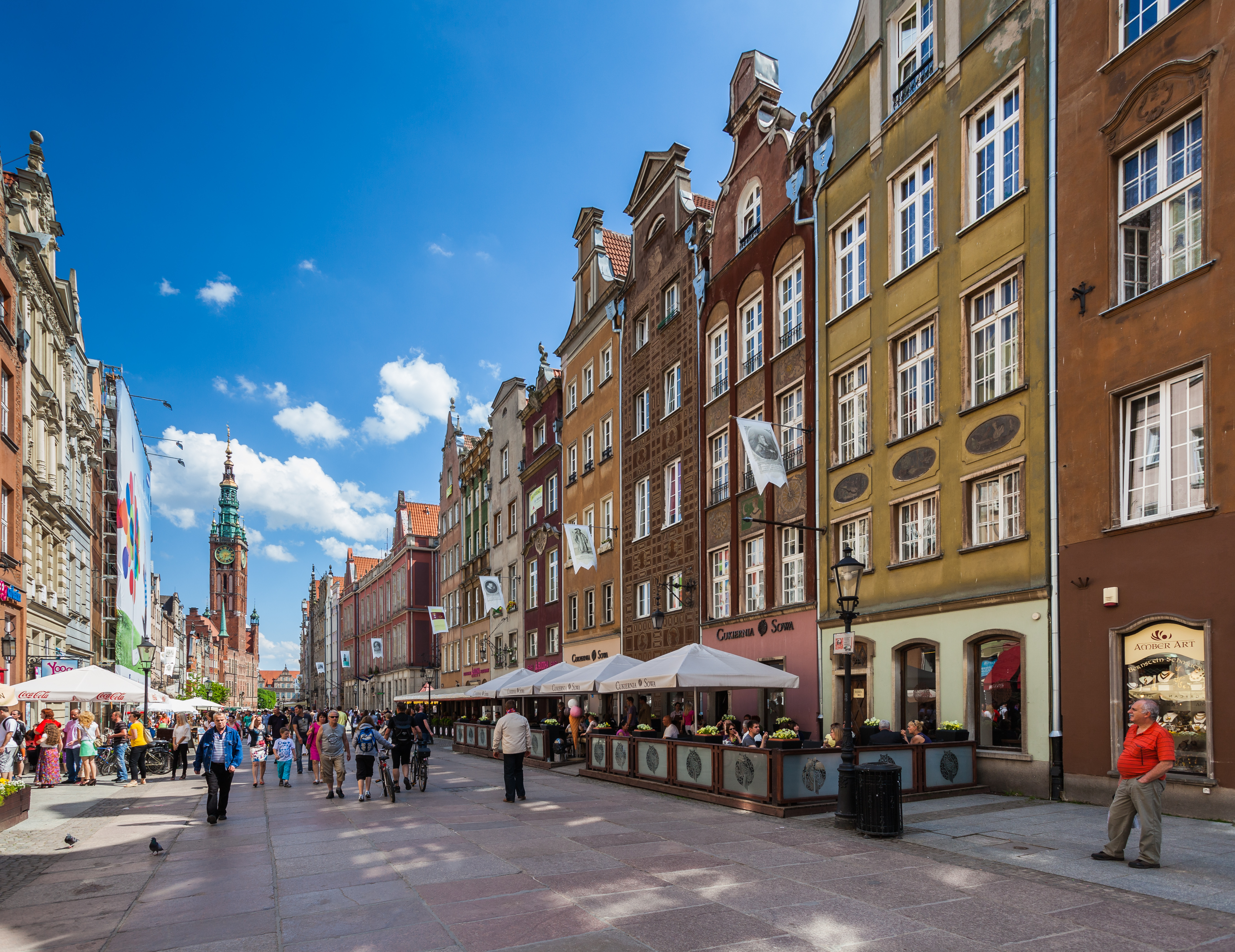
The city of Gdańsk, Poland, served as Paris for the film.

A launch event for the film was held at Adityaram Studios in Chennai on 1 February 2017 with production beginning thereafter. The shooting of the film took place at Panaiyur in East Coast Road, Chennai on the first day of the shoot, and went on continuously for 20 days until 19 February. The team took a brief break after production and then started the second schedule in Chennai on 1 March 2017. On 15 March, one of the stills from the film was unofficially released through the internet with Vijay in a twirled moustache and a dhoti, and went viral. Following the schedule's completion, the team headed to Rajasthan on 31 March, despite prior reports that filming would take place in Europe after the second schedule.

The team has decided to shoot with Vijay and Nithya Menen in Jaisalmer for a song (which was later titled as "Aalaporaan Thamizhan"), irrespective of the hot weather prevailing in the location. The steam engine named 7161WP AKBAR was used in this film while shooting in Rajasthan. An action sequence was also filmed at Rajasthan and within its completion, the team completed the Rajasthan schedule on 12 April 2017. Then, the team planned for a month-long schedule in Europe on 25 April, with Vijay, Kajal Aggarwal and other cast members being present. A song (titled "Maacho") and few action sequences were filmed at Poland (Gdańsk, Poznań and Rzeszów's airport), as well as filming being conducted in Skopje, Republic of Macedonia.

Following the shooting in Europe, the team returned to Chennai in June 2017 and began the intermediate schedule on 5 June 2017, with Samantha being present and was filmed subsequently at the location. Scenes were shot with Vijay and Devadarshini, which were later edited out of the film. Later, shooting began at Hosur, Palakkad and Ooty where scenes involving Vijay were shot. In mid-July 2017, sources had reported that the team had planned to complete the entire shooting within 130 working days, so that the team would have enough time to work on the film's post-production. However, the film's shooting was affected following the indefinite strike announced by the Film Employees Federation of South India (FEFSI) on 1 August, and another strike on 1 September. After FEFSI withdrew the strike on 13 September, work on the film's production been resumed, with few scenes being shot at the Kathipara Junction in Chennai, leading to traffic congestion as the shoot went till 8:00 A.M. despite the officials gave permission to shoot till 6:00 A.M. The climax of the film was shot in Jeeyapuram. Following a song shoot and patchwork sequences the principal photography was wrapped up.

== Themes and influences ==
The character Maaran (or ₹5 doctor), played by Vijay in the film, was inspired by Dr. Balasubramanian, a doctor who hailed from the Bodinayakkanur, Theni district, and charged patients ₹2. It is also known that Vijay's character Jeevanantham in Kaththi (2014), is inspired by a real-life social activist. Critics noted that the film has similarities related to MGR-starrers Kudiyirundha Koyil (1968) and Neerum Neruppum (1971), where he played dual roles, Rajinikanth-starrer Moondru Mugam (1982), and Kamal Haasan's Apoorva Sagodharargal (1989; Appu Raja in Hindi), which had the actors playing triple roles. Shyam Gowtham in his review for the magazine The Week has stated about the references of M. G. Ramachandran in the film saying "Vijay is doing what M. G. Ramachandran, did in the 1950s; the Dravida Munnetra Kazhagam in Tamil Nadu did what Joseph Goebbels did in Hitler’s Germany—use cinema to propagate its ideology. Thus, it changed the way films were made. There are four instances in the film where Vijay is compared with MGR—in fact, his introduction scene starts with an MGR song."

== Music ==
A. R. Rahman composed the soundtrack album and background score of Mersal, teaming up with Vijay for the third time, after his films Udhaya (2004), and Azhagiya Tamizh Magan (2007), and his first collaboration with Atlee. The lyrics for the film were written by Vivek, who also teamed up with Rahman for the first time. It marked the first release of Vijay and Rahman in the silver jubilee year. (Note: Both Vijay and Rahman made their debut in 1992, and completed 25 years in the film industry in 2017.) The audio rights of the film were acquired by Sony Music India, for a record price. The tracks "Aalaporaan Thamizhan" and "Neethanae" were released as singles on 10 and 17 August 2017. The audio launch event was held on 20 August 2017, at Jawaharlal Nehru Indoor Stadium in Chennai, which was touted to be the "biggest Kollywood event of the year", and it was attended by prominent celebrities from the Tamil film industry, featuring a live music performance by Rahman and his team. The album crossed 100 million streams, within 10 days, setting a streaming record for a Tamil album.

== Marketing ==
The first-look posters released on 21 June 2017 became the most retweeted on Twitter, accumulating close to 50,000 retweets.

As an innovative approach, Hema Rukmani teamed up with ICONICbot, an Indo-Austrian Venture, powered by actor Vishakha Singh, to launch an artificial intelligence based chat-bot for the production house through Facebook Messenger. This is a first-of-its-kind initiative in the South Indian film industry using artificial intelligence technology to connect with moviegoers personally; similar chatbots have been used in Hindi cinema by top stars to promote their films. Hema Rukmani had stated that "though we share the information about the film through the official Twitter handle of the production house, there must be false news prevailing all around. So, we had planned for launching TSL chatbot where fans can share the relevant information with them exclusively."

The film is the first South Indian production to get a Twitter emoji of its first look and to trademark its title. A few sources from the production house stated, "If one uses the term Mersal for commercial purposes, a part of the revenue should be paid to the team as royalty."

The teaser trailer of the film was unveiled on 21 September 2017 (coinciding with Atlee's birthday) and became the most-viewed Indian movie teaser with 34.6 million views, surpassing Kabali (2016) and Vivegam (2017), and became the first Indian movie teaser to get 1 million likes.

Two TV spots were premiered during the television broadcast of Baahubali 2: The Conclusion (Tamil dubbed version) on 8 October 2017.

Sources claimed that the innovative marketing strategies of the film contributed to the film's success. Exchange4Media, an advertising company, commented that Mersal was one of the South Indian films that disrupted the digital marketing space.

== Release ==
=== Theatrical ===
Mersal was earlier scheduled for theatrical release on 29 September 2017. However, as Shankar's 2.0, which was scheduled for release on Diwali (18 October 2017), was delayed due to extensive visual effects, the producers decided to release the film on that date. On 16 October 2017, the film received a U/A certificate from the CBFC, with a few cuts after obtaining an NOC from the AWBI.

The film opened on more than 3,300 screens worldwide which is highest for a Tamil film. In Malaysia, the film released on 800 screens, and more than 275 screens in Kerala. In Karnataka, the film was released in 100 screens, and in Andhra Pradesh, it accounted 400 screens. The film was later screened in PVR Cinemas and Inox Multiplex on 24 October 2017, following their strike against the double taxation row which held on 3 October. The film was re-released again in March 2018, following the producer council's strike against digital service providers over the increase of Virtual Print Fee charges.

Mersal was screened at Grand Rex, France, which is the largest cinema theatre in Europe, due to the high demand of the film. It was further released in Japan in four major cities Tokyo, Ebino, Osaka and Nakayama, which is the highest for a Tamil film. The film was released in China by HGC Entertainment on 6 December 2018, through 10,000 screens, Mersal became the first Tamil film to be released in this country. The film was screened at the Hainan International Film Festival in Hainan, China in March 2019, and at the Bucheon International Fantastic Film Festival in Bucheon, South Korea at 29 July 2018.

=== Distribution ===
North Star Entertainment along with SN Techs Film Distribution Company have secured the distribution rights for the film in Andhra Pradesh and Telangana; Global United Media has secured the distribution for the film in Kerala; Horizon Studios acquired the Karnataka rights; MKS Talkies has secured the distribution rights for the film in Australia and New Zealand, ATMUS Entertainment has secured the distribution rights for the film in United States. The overall pre-release revenue of Mersal is reported to be in the region of ₹156 crore (US$16 million), which includes the Tamil Nadu theatrical rights about ₹70 crore (US$7.3 million), Karnataka distribution rights about ₹5.5 crore (US$570,000), Kerala rights about ₹6.6 crore (US$690,000), Andhra Pradesh and Nizam rights about ₹4.6 crore (US$480,000), Rest of India, for ₹80 lakh (US$83,000), and Overseas rights about ₹26 crore (US$2.7 million). The worldwide theatrical rights accounted to ₹113.5 crore (US$12 million), while the satellite rights, sold to ₹28 crore (US$2.9 million), music rights for ₹3.5 crore (US$360,000), home video rights for ₹1.5 crore (US$160,000), and Hindi dubbing rights for ₹11 crore (US$1.1 million).

=== Home media ===
The television broadcast rights were sold to Zee Tamil for ₹30 crore in July 2017. The film had its global television premiere on 14 January 2018 on occasion of the Thai Pongal festival. The satellite rights of the Telugu, Kannada and the Malayalam dubbed versions were acquired by Star Maa, Udaya TV and Asianet respectively. It is available in digital streaming platforms through Netflix and ZEE5 (in Tamil), YouTube and Prime video (in Telugu), Sun NXT (in Kannada), and Hotstar (in Malayalam). The film's Hindi dubbed version was directly premiered on Dhinchaak TV channel (now renamed to Goldmines) on 13 March 2022.

== Reception ==
=== Box office ===
In the opening day of its release the film earned ₹31.3 crore in domestic region and ₹47.1 crore worldwide.

==== India ====
At the Chennai city box office, the film collected ₹1.50 crore and became the highest opening day grosser, beating Ajith Kumar's Vivegam. The film became the biggest opener in Tamil Nadu at that point, grossing ₹24.8 crore and yielded a share of ₹14.1 crore to its distributors. It eventually broke the record of Rajinikanth's Kabali which earlier collected ₹21.5 crore.

==== Other territories ====
The film collected ₹1.7 crore from the premiere shows held at United States and ₹2.5 crore the following day, totalling up to ₹3.08 crore. The film earned A$133,057 (₹68.01 lakh) from 25 locations, upon its release in Australia and earned £94,311 (₹81.08 lakhs) upon its release in United Kingdom in 37 locations, according to trade analyst Taran Adarsh. The film collected ₹90.31 lakhs from its opening day in Malaysia around 800 theatres.

In its five-day opening weekend, the film collected ₹140 crore (1.4 billion Indian rupees) worldwide and ₹170 crore its first week. In 12 days, the film grossed ₹200 crore worldwide, including ₹130 crore domestically in India. It became the highest-grossing film of Vijay's career, and the first of his films to enter the ₹200 crore club. At the end of its fifth week, the film had reportedly collected ₹120 crore in Tamil Nadu, ₹16 crore in Kerala, ₹13 crore in Karnataka and ₹15 crore from the rest of India, tallying ₹164 crore (1.6 billion rupees) domestically and ₹260 crore (2.6 billion rupees) worldwide. According to The Hans India article published in January 2018, the movie has raked in ₹244.8 crores by the end of its run.

However, according to the articles by Hindustan Times, Financial Express and India Today, one of the leading distributors, Ramanathan, owner of the Abhirami Mega Mall, said that the numbers reported by Mersal are highly inflated. The movie has not raked in ₹200 crore as reports claim.

=== Critical response ===
Mersal received positive reviews from critics.

M. Suganth, editor-in-chief of The Times of India rated the film three-and-a-half out of five and said, "With Mersal, we have got this year's most engaging mass masala movie. When you have a mass hero in full form like Vijay is in the film, how can things go wrong?". Manoj Kumar R. of The Indian Express also gave three-and-a-half out of five stars stating "Atlee has not just exploited Vijay's stardom to deliver a flamboyant crowd-pleaser (which he did in Theri already) but has fleshed out an interesting script that plays up the best onscreen traits of the actor."

Sify rated the film three out of five stars and said the film as a "formulaic mass masala action film with a strong social message, whistle worthy moments, eye candy heroines and grand visuals". It further added that the film "relies squarely on the charm of its leading man (Vijay) to pull off its over-the-top tone". Priyanka Sundar of Hindustan Times said that the film "is not about the story, but the way it is delivered; the emotions, sentiment and social message formed the crux of the story", but criticised the length of the second half and the manner in which Samantha's character's arc is resolved. Behindwoods stated there are triple Vijay in the movie and it had created triple positive impact and rated it 2.75 out of five stars.

Baradwaj Rangan of Film Companion South called the film as "gigantic, but deflavoured take of Apoorva Sagotharargal". He added that "the lack of newness is compensated for by rich production values", but praised Vijay's performance saying "Vijay is one actor who seems to be getting younger on screen. He moves beautifully in the dance sequences. He even manages an effective dramatic bit. But he’s let down by the writing". Anupama Subramanian of Deccan Chronicle gave two-and-a-half out of five stars and added "Though the storyline is not new, Atlee cleverly uses the terrific screen presence of Vijay and presents it in an engaging way". Vishal Menon of The Hindu had opined that the film had "references to yesteryear blockbusters; but that could not be determined as dislikeable; it is quite enjoyable".

Sreedhar Pillai of Firstpost called that "the perfect film for the larger-than-life image of its superstar Vijay, has something in it to satiate viewers with varied tastes", giving a rating of three out of five stars. The New Indian Express-based critic Daniel Thimmayya called the film as "ultimate commercial entertainer that rides on Vijay's solid performance and Atlee's slick storytelling".

Srivatsan S of India Today gave three out of five saying "one could say that Mersal is nothing but the rise of a matinee idol". Poornima Murali of News18 called the film "as good in parts: during the evocative flashbacks"; but pointed out a few lame dialogues, logical contradictions and frequent song sequences. Vikram Venkateshwaran of The Quint wrote "It’s got three whole Vijays, with intersecting plot lines, great fight scenes and twelve murders, that will either squeeze your heart, or make you cheer along, all in the name of entertainment". Writing for Manorama Online, Prem Udhayabhanu gave the film three out of five stars saying "The film charms the fans with an elaborate canvas spun for the hero and a social message weaved into it".

Shyam Goutham, in his review for the magazine The Week wrote "through the film which is packaged with heavy drama and action sequences, Atlee tries to convey a message. For a Vijay fan, there are enough wow moments—slow-motion scenes, 'Ilayathalapathy' saving people and punch dialogues. In fact, a scene showing Vijay talking to the media about the problems in the country has become mandatory". Ananda Vikatan rated the film 43 out of 100.

== Controversies ==
The film was subjected to several criticisms. The first was the interim ban issued against the film producers by Madras High Court, for using the title Mersal for promotions. In a lawsuit filed by Rajendran of AR Film Factory, he registered the title Mersalayitten at the Tamil Film Producers Council in 2014, and claimed that the use of the title will affect the business of his film. The high court later dismissed the plea on 6 October 2017. The Tamil Film Producers Council strike from 6–13 October over double taxation row, and the denial of NOC from Animal Welfare Board of India (AWBI) were rumoured to affect the plans release; however, it was resolved later.

Upon release, several notions expressed in the film were opposed by various organisations. The Bharatiya Janata Party (BJP), the ruling political party of Government of India, and the then ruling AIADMK had objected to scenes in which the protagonist, played by Vijay, criticises the recently introduced Goods and Services Tax, and also a scene in which a character ridicules Digital India, an initiative promoted by the Government of India. The ruling BJP demanded that those scenes be cut from the film for future viewership. Several medical associations such as the Tamil Nadu Government Doctors' Association, condemned the film for the alleged cynical portrayal of doctors working in government-operated hospitals. Doctors working with the Indian Medical Association planned to boycott the film and shared links of the film on pirated websites online, in the hope that it would cause monetary losses to the makers of the film. These acts were seen as an attack on freedom of expression by opposing political parties and various other celebrities working in Tamil cinema. Shashi Tharoor condemned BJP's acts against Mersal, similar to infringement of democratic rights.

Mersal was also associated with conflicting claims regarding its financial outcome for the producers. According to producer T. Siva, while the film performed well for distributors and others involved in its business, the production house, Thenandal Studios Limited, reportedly incurred losses. He attributed this to the high production costs and the prevailing business model in the film industry.

Similarly, actor S. Ve. Shekher claimed that producer Murali Ramaswamy suffered losses of nearly ₹100 crore despite the film being declared a blockbuster.

The film was touted to have an approximate organic collection of ₹100-150 crore, the production house Thenandal Studio Limited had to file for bankruptcy due to the high production costs involved. The social media propaganda loss of this film amounts to an approximate ₹60 crore, with references citing Atlee asked a salary hike of more than 300% and exceeding the production budget. However, G. Dhananjayan opined that the film was considered profitable to all distributors across Tamil Nadu region, as was, the film's producer Murali Ramaswamy. In November 2018, the Canada-based magician Raman Sharma, who worked in the project accused Thenandal Studios of non-payment of dues and slammed the company for their unprofessional behaviour. In August, Sharma's team sent a legal notice to the makers, demanding the rest of his payment under the Insolvency and Bankruptcy Code, 2016. The financial tussles surrounding over the production house led the makers shelve all of their upcoming projects: notably the company's big-budget film Sangamithra, Dhanush's untitled project with Karthik Subbaraj and his directorial film, (Note: The project was later exchanged to YNOT Studios and released under the title Jagame Thandhiram in 2021.) A. R. Rahman's virtual reality film Le Musk, and other productions; furthermore, their completed projects Vallavanukkum Vallavan and Iravaakaalam remained unreleased.

== Accolades ==
At the 65th Filmfare Awards South, Mersal received eleven nominations including those for Best Director (Atlee), Best Actor (Vijay) and Best Supporting Actor (S. J. Surya). It won in two categories – Best Supporting Actress (Menen) and Best Music Director (Rahman). At the 10th Vijay Awards, the film received eight nominations and won three awards: Favourite Film, Best Director and Favourite Song. Mersal received twelve nominations at the 7th South Indian International Movie Awards ceremony and won five awards, including Best Director for Atlee, Best Actor in a Negative Role for Surya and Best Music Director for Rahman. Among other wins, the film received ten Techofes Awards, seven Edison Awards, five Ananda Vikatan Cinema Awards and two Norway Tamil Film Festival Awards. At the international ceremonies, the film won one award for Best Foreign Film at the National Film Awards UK. and Best International actor award for Vijay at International Achievement Recognition Award UK.

== Legacy and impact ==
Prior to the film's release, Hollywood stuntman Serge Crozon Cazin, who starred in Ajith Kumar's Vivegam, and S. S. Rajamouli expressed their anticipations on the film, with the latter calling it as "a fantastic film to look forward to". Following the criticism towards the GST and Digital India-scenes levied by BJP, Rajinikanth, Kamal Haasan, Vishal, Vijay Sethupathi, Arvind Swamy and Khushbu Sundar, extended their support towards Mersal and praised Vijay and the team for "bravely addressing social issues in the film". As H. Raja criticised the Censor Board officials over the film's certification after watching the film online, demanding that they should be removed from posts, Gautami Tadimalla, the member of CBFC who watched a screening of the film on 22 October, claimed that "Mersal has been given a fair censor certificate. There was no foul in the film’s dialogues with reference to GST, and asking the scenes to be lifted off the film is a direct threat to freedom of speech." The South Indian Film Chamber of Commerce wrote a letter to Smriti Irani, the Information and Broadcasting minister, seeking action against H. Raja for watching the pirated version of the film online. In a positive note, Mersal emerged as the most tweeted hashtag of 2017 in the entertainment section, according to a survey report by Twitter.
