= Vijay Award for Best Art Director =

Indian film award

The Vijay Award for Best Art Director is given by STAR Vijay as part of its annual Vijay Awards ceremony for Tamil (Kollywood) films.

== The list ==
This is the list of the award winners and the films for which they won.

| Year | Art Director | Film | Link |
|---|---|---|---|
| 2017 | T. Muthuraj | Velaikkaran | |
| 2014 | Sabu Cyril | Lingaa | |
| 2013 | Lalgudi N. Ilaiyaraja & Thor | Vishwaroopam | |
| 2012 | R. K. Vijay Murugan | Aravaan | |
| 2011 | Seenu | Vaagai Sooda Vaa | |
| 2010 | Selvakumar | Madrasapattinam | |
| 2009 | Vairabalan | Pokkisham | |
| 2008 | Samir Chanda, M. Prabhaharan, Thotta Tharani | Dasavathaaram | |
| 2007 | Thotta Tharani | Sivaji | |
| 2006 | Sabu Cyril | | |

== Nominations ==
- 2007 Thotta Tharani - Sivaji
  - Jackson - Paruthiveeran
  - Kathir - Pokkiri
  - Milan - Billa
  - Saikumar - Polladhavan
- 2008 Samir Chanda, Prabhaharan & Thotta Tharani - Dasavathaaram
  - Rajeevan - - Vaaranam Aayiram
  - Rembon - Subramaniapuram
  - Videsh - Saroja
- 2009 Vairabalan - Pokkisham
  - Rajeevan - Ayan and Aadhavan
  - Sabu Cyril - Kanchivaram
  - Samir Chanda - Yavarum Nalam
  - Thotta Tharani - Kanthaswamy
- 2010 Selvakumar - Madrasapattinam
  - Muthuraj - Irumbukkottai Murattu Singam
  - Videsh - Naan Mahaan Alla
  - Sabu Cyril - Enthiran
  - T. Santhanam - Aayirathil Oruvan
- 2011 Seenu - Vaagai Sooda Vaa
  - Rajeevan - 7 Aum Arivu
  - Videsh - Aaranya Kaandam
  - Jackson - Aadukalam
  - Kathir - Payanam
- 2012 R. K. Vijay Murugan - Aravaan
  - Muthuraj - Nanban
  - Rajeevan - Maattrraan
  - Sunil Babu - Thuppakki
  - Vairabalan - Kumki
- 2013 Lalgudi N. Ilaiyaraja & Thor - Vishwaroopam
  - C. S. Balachandar - Paradesi
  - T. Muthuraj - Raja Rani
  - Rajeevan - Pandiya Naadu
  - Selvakumar - Vanakkam Chennai
- 2014 Sabu Cyril - Lingaa

== See also ==
- Tamil cinema
- Cinema of India
