= Atlee (director) =

Indian film director, screenwriter and film producer (born 1986)

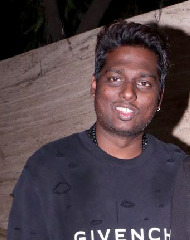
- Atlee in 2024
- Born: Arun Kumar; 21 September 1986 (age 40); Thiruparankundram, Madurai, Tamil Nadu, India
- Occupations: Film director; screenwriter; producer
- Years active: 2010-present
- Spouse: Priya Atlee (m. 2014)
- Children: 2

Arun ''Atlee'' Kumar (born 21 September 1986) is an Indian filmmaker who primarily works in Tamil films. He made his directorial debut with the film Raja Rani (2013) for which he was awarded Best Debut Director by the Vijay Award and the Tamil Nadu State Award for best dialogue writer. Atlee wrote and directed Theri (2016), Mersal (2017), and Bigil (2019), all featuring Vijay. He made his debut in Hindi cinema with Jawan (2023), which is among the highest grossing Indian films.

== Career ==
Atlee pursued a Bachelor of Arts in Visual Communications at Sathyabama University, Chennai. While studying at the university, he made the short film En Mel Vizhundha Mazhaithuli. He then appealed to Mani Rathnam, S. Shankar and Gautham Vasudev Menon in search of work and Shankar agreed for him to work under him. He worked as assistant director for the films Enthiran (2010) and Nanban (2012), a remake of the Hindi film 3 Idiots. He made short films including Mugaputhagam (2011). The theme of putting "spotlight on crimes around women followed by wishful justice" was followed in Atlee's future work starting with Theri.

In 2013, Atlee went on to make his directorial debut with Raja Rani, a rom com produced by A. R. Murugadoss. It starred Arya, Jai, Nayanthara, Nazriya Nazim, and Sathyaraj. It earned over ₹50 crores at the box office and won him the Best Debut Director award at the Vijay Awards. Atlee directed his next film, Theri (2016), action thriller, produced by Kalaipuli S. Thanu, starring Vijay, Samantha, and Amy Jackson in the lead roles. It received positive reviews from the critics who praised the performances of the cast, soundtrack, score, cinematography, production design, and action sequences. Grossing over ₹150 crores at the box office, it emerged a commercial success and became the second highest grossing Tamil of 2016.

In 2017, Atlee directed Mersal, an action thriller, produced by Thenandal Studio Limited. Again starring Vijay, it also had Nithya Menen, Kajal Aggarwal, Samantha Ruth Prabhu, S. J. Suryah and Sathyaraj. It became one of the highest-grossing films in Tamil cinema, grossing more than ₹260 crores worldwide. The film became the recipient of various accolades. Due to demand, the film was screened at the largest cinema theatre in Europe Grand Rex, France. The film was screened at the Hainan International Film Festival in Hainan, China and at the Bucheon International Fantastic Film Festival in South Korea.

Atlee directed his next film, Bigil (2019), a sports action drama, produced by AGS Entertainment. He reunited for the third and second time with Vijay and Nayanthara, respectively. It also starred Jackie Shroff, Vivek and Kathir in other prominent roles. The music was composed by A. R. Rahman. Upon release, it received mix to positive reviews and emerged as the highest-grossing Tamil film of 2019 and one of the highest-grossing Tamil films of all-time.

In 2017, Atlee and his wife Krishna Priya started their own production house, A for Apple Productions. They jointly produced their first film with Fox Star Studios, Sangili Bungili Kadhava Thorae, a horror comedy, written and directed by Ike. It starred Jiiva, Sri Divya, and Soori in the lead roles. In 2020, He produced Andhaghaaram, a supernatural horror thriller film, written and directed by V. Vignarajan. It was released directly on Netflix for streaming, on 24 November 2020.

Atlee made his debut in Hindi cinema with Jawan, starring Shah Rukh Khan, Nayanthara, Vijay Sethupathi, Priyamani, Sanya Malhotra, Riddhi Dogra, along with others. It was produced by Red Chillies Entertainment. It released on 7 September 2023 to generally positive reviews. It made ₹1150 crores worldwide in its entire run and becoming one of the highest grossing Indian films.

Atlee and his wife Krishna Priya produced their third film in Hindi named Baby John starring Varun Dhawan, Keerthy Suresh, and Wamiqa Gabbi; its a remake of his Tamil film, Theri (2016). The music was composed by Thaman S. He will be collaborating with Allu Arjun in Raaka, which is being produced by Kalanithi Maran, under Sun Pictures.

== Personal life ==
Atlee married actress Krishna Priya on 9 November 2014. They have a son, born 2023, and a daughter, born 2026.

== Filmography ==
=== Creative and production ===
Year	Title	Director	Screenwriter	Producer	Language	Notes	Ref.
2013	Raja Rani	Yes	Yes	No	Tamil		
2016	Theri	Yes	Yes	No	Tamil		
2017	Sangili Bungili Kadhava Thorae	No	No	Yes	Tamil		
2017	Mersal	Yes	Yes	No	Tamil		
2019	Bigil	Yes	Yes	No	Tamil	Special appearance as himself in the song "Singappenney"	
2020	Andhaghaaram	No	No	Yes	Tamil		
2023	Jawan	Yes	Yes	No	Hindi	Special appearance as himself in the song "Zinda Banda"; partially reshot in Tamil	
2024	Baby John	No	No	Yes	Hindi		
2026	Baththa	No	No	Yes	Tamil		
2028	Raaka †	Yes	Yes	No	Tamil; Telugu	Filming	

=== Special appearances ===
- Bigil (2019) — as himself in the song “Singa Penne”
- Jawan (2023) — as himself in the song “Zinda Banda”
- Jana Nayagan (2026) — as a reporter

=== Recurring collaborations ===
Only people with 3+ collaborations are listed. Editor Ruben, production designer T. Muthuraj and actor Sai Dheena have worked on five of Atlee's films. Shobi and Yogi Babu have worked on four of his films. This list only concerns Atlee's directorial films.

Films	Ruben	T. Muthuraj	Sai Dheena	Shobi	Yogi Babu	Vijay	Nayanthara	G. K. Vishnu	Vivek (lyricist)	Manobala	Rajendran
Raja Rani (2013)	check	check	check				check			check	check
Theri (2016)	check	check	check	check	deleted scene	check				check	check
Mersal (2017)	check	check	check	check	check	check		check	check		check
Bigil (2019)	check	check	check	check	check	check	check	check	check	check	
Jawan (2023)	check	check	check	check	Tamil version		check	check	Tamil version		
Raaka †	check	check						check			

== Plagiarism allegations ==
Atlee's films, though commercially successful, have been criticized for seemingly borrowing their storylines from other films. Raja Rani was described as an upgraded version of Mouna Ragam (1986), while Theri was described as having been highly inspired by Chatriyan (1990). Chatriyan was produced by Mani Ratnam, who directed Mouna Ragam. Mersal was described as an upgraded version of Apoorva Sagodharargal (1989), and Bigil was described by Shah Rukh Khan as "Chak De India on steroids". Atlee has claimed that, despite having been sued for plagiarism multiple times, he has won all the cases filed against him.

== Accolades ==
Film	Award	Category	Result	Ref
Raja Rani	Tamil Nadu State Film Awards 2013	Best Dialogue Writer	Won	
Raja Rani	Edison Awards	Best Debut Director	Won	
Raja Rani	8th Vijay Awards	Best Debut Director	Won	
Raja Rani	8th Vijay Awards	Best Story, Screenplay Writer	Nominated	
Raja Rani	8th Vijay Awards	Best Dialogue	Nominated	
Raja Rani	3rd SIIMA Awards	Best Debut Director	Nominated	
Theri	2nd IIFA Utsavam	Best Director – Tamil	Won	
Theri	6th SIIMA Awards	Best Director – Tamil	Won	
Theri	64th Filmfare Awards South	Best Director – Tamil	Nominated	
Mersal	Edison Awards 2018	Best Director	Won	
Mersal	65th Filmfare Awards South	Best Director – Tamil	Nominated	
Mersal	7th SIIMA Awards	Best Director – Tamil	Won	
Mersal	10th Vijay Awards	Favourite Director	Won	
Mersal	10th Vijay Awards	Best Dialogue	Nominated	
Jawan	NDTV Indian Of The Year Awards 2024	Best director of the year	Won	
