= Shobi (choreographer) =

Indian choreographer

- Born: Shobi Paulraj; Chennai, Tamil Nadu, India
- Occupation: Dance choreographer
- Years active: 1996–present
- Spouse: Lalitha Shobi
- Relatives: Robert (cousin); Alphonsa (cousin)

Shobi Paulraj is an Indian choreographer in the Tamil film industry. He has also worked on some Telugu, Hindi and Malayalam films. He is the founder of IBO Dance Studio.

== Career ==
After assisting choreographers such as Raju Sundaram, DKS Babu and Chinni Prakash while also working as background dancer for many songs, he made his debut as choreographer with Vasool Raja MBBS where he choreographed his first song "Aalwarpettai Aaluda".

== Filmography ==
=== Choreographer ===
Year	Film	Language	Notes
2004	Vasool Raja MBBS	Tamil	
2005	Thirupaachi	Tamil	
2005	Sachein	Tamil	
2005	Aaru	Tamil	
2005	Sivakasi	Tamil	
2006	Aathi	Tamil	
2006	Paramasivan	Tamil	
2006	Bommarillu	Telugu	Song: "Kani Ippudu"
2006	Vikramarkudu	Telugu	Song: "College Papala"
2007	Yamadonga	Telugu	Song: "Nunugu Misalodu"
2007	Thaamirabharani	Tamil	
2007	Vel	Tamil	
2007	Azhagiya Tamil Magan	Tamil	
2008	Sakkarakatti	Tamil	
2008	Santhosh Subramaniam	Tamil	
2008	Kuruvi	Tamil	
2008	Dhaam Dhoom	Tamil	
2008	Jalsa	Telugu	
2008	Seval	Tamil	
2009	TN 07 AL 4777	Tamil	
2009	Villu	Tamil	
2009	Kanthaswamy	Tamil	
2009	Sankham	Telugu	
2009	Aadhavan	Tamil	
2009	Vettaikaaran	Tamil	
2010	Singam	Tamil	
2010	Enthiran	Tamil	
2010	Manmadhan Ambu	Tamil	
2011	Mankatha	Tamil	
2011	7 Aum Arivu	Tamil	
2011	Velayudham	Tamil	
2012	Nanban	Tamil	
2012	Thuppakki	Tamil	
2012	Mallu Singh	Malayalam	
2013	Baadshah	Telugu	Song: "Baadshah"
2013	Ramayya Vasthavayya	Telugu	Song: "Idhi Ranarangam"
2013	Arrambam	Tamil	
2013	Pandiya Naadu	Tamil	
2013	Attarintiki Daredi	Telugu	
2014	Yevadu	Telugu	Song: "Ayyo Paapam"
2014	Govindudu Andarivadele	Telugu	Song: "Prathi Chota Nake Swagatham"
2014	Naan Sigappu Manithan	Tamil	
2014	Holiday: A Soldier Is Never Off Duty	Hindi	
2014	Kaththi	Tamil	
2014	Lingaa	Tamil	
2014	Jeeva	Tamil	
2015	I	Tamil	
2015	Aambala	Tamil	
2015	Paayum Puli	Tamil	
2015	Massu Engira Masilamani	Tamil	
2015	Uttama Villain	Tamil	
2015	Vedalam	Tamil	
2015	Thoongavanam	Tamil	
2016	Chakravyuha	Kannada	Song: "Geleya Geleya"
2016	Jaguar	Telugu/Kannada	
2016	Gethu	Tamil	
2016	A Aa	Telugu	
2016	Kathakali	Tamil	
2016	Iru Mugan	Tamil	
2016	Theri	Tamil	
2016	Maaveeran Kittu	Tamil	
2017	Spyder	Telugu/Tamil	
2017	Kavan	Tamil	
2017	Si3	Tamil	
2017	Katha Nayagan	Tamil	
2017	Mersal	Tamil	
2017	Nenjil Thunivirundhal	Tamil/Telugu	
2017	Velaikkaran	Tamil	
2018	Sarkar	Tamil	
2018	Dev	Tamil	
2018	Rangasthalam	Telugu	Song: "Aa Gattununtava"
2019	Namma Veettu Pillai	Tamil	
2019	Kaappaan	Tamil	
2019	Bigil	Tamil	
2020	Darbar	Tamil	
2020	Soorarai Pottru	Tamil	
2021	Eeswaran	Tamil	
2021	Pushpa: The Rise	Telugu	Song: "Srivalli"
2022	Don	Tamil	
2022	Prince	Tamil	
2022	Sardar	Tamil	
2023	Varisu	Tamil	
2023	Kathar Basha Endra Muthuramalingam	Tamil	
2023	Maaveeran	Tamil	
2023	Jawan	Hindi	Song: "Zinda Banda"
2024	Kanguva	Tamil	
2024	Baby John	Hindi	
2025	Madha Gaja Raja	Tamil	
2025	Kadhalikka Neramillai	Tamil	
2025	Hari Hara Veera Mallu	Telugu	
2025	Diesel	Tamil	
2026	The RajaSaab	Telugu	
2026	Youth	Tamil	
2026	Karuppu	Tamil	

=== Dancer ===
Year	Film	Song	Language	Notes
2000	Kushi	"Macarena"	Tamil	
2000	Pennin Manathai Thottu	"Kalloori Vaanil"	Tamil	
2000	Rhythm	"Thaniye"	Tamil	
2001	Friends	"Rukku Rukku"	Tamil	
2001	Minnale	"Azhagiya Theeye"	Tamil	
2001	Shahjahan	"Kadhal Oru"	Tamil	
2001	Majunu	"Pada Pada Pattampoochi"	Tamil	
2002	Red	"Kannai Kasakkum"	Tamil	
2002	123	"Kanchivaram Povom"	Tamil	
2002	Youth	"Old Model Laila"	Tamil	
2003	Naaga	"Oka Konte Pillane"	Telugu	
2003	Vaseegara	"Oru Thadavai Solvaya"	Tamil	
2003	Kadhal Sadugudu	"Sugandhi Sellai"	Tamil	
2003	Parthiban Kanavu	"Theeradha Dum"	Tamil	
2003	Alai	"Alai Adikuthu"	Tamil	
2004	Ghilli	"Kokkarakko"	Tamil	
2006	Bommarillu	"Kaani Ippudu"	Telugu	
2008	Santosh Subramaniam	"Kadhaluku Kanngal Illai"	Tamil	Remake of "Kaani Ippudu"
2008	Sakkarakatti	"Taxi Taxi Nanba"	Tamil	
2009	TN 07 AL 4777	"Aathichudi"	Tamil	
2010	Manmadhan Ambu	"Oyyale"	Tamil	
2012	Nanban	"Asku Laska"	Tamil	
2012	Mallu Singh	"Raba Raba"	Malayalam	
2017	Kathanayagan	"Sunday Na Bottle Edu"	Tamil	
2018	Sollividava	"Jai Hanumantha"	Tamil	

== Awards and nominations ==
Won

- 2009 Vijay Award for Best Choreographer - TN 07 AL 4777
- 2013 Tamil Nadu State Film Award for Best Choreographer -Pandiya Naadu
- 2012 Ananda Vikatan Cinema Award for Best Choreographer - Thuppakki
- 2014 Filmfare Award for Best Dance Choreographer – South - Kaththi
- 2014 Ananda Vikatan Cinema Award for Best Choreographer - Kaththi
- 2014 Edison Award for Best Choreographer - Kaththi
- 2014 Vijay Award for Best Choreographer - Jeeva
- 2017 Edison Award for Best Choreographer - Mersal, Velaikkaran
- 2019 Ananda Vikatan Cinema Award for Best Choreographer - Bigil
- 2022 Kerala State Film Award for Best Choreography - Thallumaala

Nominated

- 2008 Vijay Award for Best Choreographer - Sakkarakatti
- 2009 Vijay Award for Best Choreographer - Aadhavan
- 2012 Vijay Award for Best Choreographer - Thuppakki
- 2024 Filmfare Award for Best Choreography - Jawan
