= Edison Awards (India) =

Tamil film industry awards

- Current: Edison Awards 2020
- Official logo
- Awarded for: Excellence in Tamil cinema and Music
- Location: Chennai
- Country: India
- Presented by: MyTamilMovie.com
- Established: 2009
- First award: 2009
- Final award: 2025
- Website: Edison Awards

Television/radio coverage
- Network: Fame Private Channel

The Edison Awards is an annual awards ceremony since 2009 for people in the Tamil film industry. It is named after the inventor of motion pictures, Sir Thomas Alva Edison. It reaches seven countries with Tamil language television, with the main broadcaster Astro in Malaysia.

The event is mainly organised by its founder J. Selva Kumar and hosted by MyTamilMovie.com. The main sponsors in recent years have been Jet Airways and Videocon.

The show is augmented by talent search analysis, live concerts by professional Tamil playback singers and young emergers and dancers. The awards are given based on People's Choice conceptual, implemented with online voting, SMS voting, and Dial-a-Vote.

== Awards ==
=== Merit awards ===
- Best Actor

Year	Awardee	Movie
2009	Jayam Ravi	Peraanmai
2010	Silambarasan	Vinnaithaandi Varuvaayaa
2011	Vijay	Velayudham
2012	Vijay	Thuppakki
2013	Vikram	Thaandavam
2014	Dhanush	Maryan
2015	Dhanush	Velaiilla Pattadhari
2016	Jayam Ravi	Thani Oruvan
2017	Silambarasan	Achcham Yenbadhu Madamaiyada
2018	Karthi	Theeran Adhigaaram Ondru
2019	Dhanush	Vada Chennai

- Best Actress

Year	Movie	Awardee
2009	Achamundu Achamundu	Sneha
2010	Vinnaithaandi Varuvaaya	Trisha
2011	Mayakkam Enna	Richa Gangopadhyay
2013	Oru Kal Oru Kannadi	Hansika Motwani
2015	Naanum Rowdy Dhaan	Nayanthara
2017	Kodi	Trisha
2018	Aramm	Nayanthara
2019	Raatchasi	Jyothika
2021	Ponmagal Vandhal	Jyothika

=== Multiple wins ===
The following individuals have received two or more Best Actress awards:

Wins	Actress
2	Jyothika; Trisha Krishnan; Nayanthara

- Best Debut Actor

Year	Movie	Awardee
2009	Vennila Kabadi Kuzhu	Vishnu Vishal
2010	Baana Kaathaadi	Adharvaa
2011	Mankatha	Mahat Raghavendra
2012	Oru Kal Oru Kannadi	Udhayanidhi Stalin
2013	Kadal	Gautham Karthik
2014	Kayal	Chandran
2015	Darling	G. V. Prakash Kumar
2016	Metro	Metro Shirish
2017	Taramani	Vasanth Ravi

- Best Debut Actress

Year	Movie	Awardee
2009	Malayan	Shammu
2010	Mynaa	Amala Paul
2011	Vaagai Sooda Vaa	Iniya
2012	Podaa Podi	Varalaxmi Sarathkumar
2013	Neram	Nazriya Nazim
2014	Madras	Catherine Tresa
2015	Darling	Nikki Galrani
2016	Achcham Yenbadhu Madamaiyada	Manjima Mohan
2017	Aruvi	Aditi Balan
2018	Pyaar Prema Kaadhal	Raiza Wilson

- Best Male Rising Star

Year	Awardee
2009	Vijay
2010	Vishal
2011	Bharath Srinivasan
2012	Vijay Sethupathi
2013	Sivakarthikeyan
2014	Hiphop Tamizha
2015	Jiiva
2016	Gautham Karthik
2017	Arvind Swamy
2018	Arun Vijay
2019	Simbu

- Best Female Rising Star

Year	Awardee
2010	Samantha Ruth Prabhu
2012	Oviya
2013	Sri Divya
2014	Janani Iyer
2015	Keerthy Suresh
2017	Parvatii Nair
2018	Aishwarya Dutta

- Best Supportive Actor

Year	Movie	Awardee
2009	Unnaipol Oruvan	Ganesh Venkatraman
2012	Kazhugu	Karunas
2013	Thalaivaa	Subbu Panchu
2014	Madras	Hari Krishnan
2015	Kanchana 2	Sriman
2016	Kabali	John Vijay
2017	Pa. Pandi	Prasanna

- Best Supportive Actress

Year	Movie	Awardee
2010	Naan Mahaan Alla	Neelima Rani
2012	3	Rohini
2016	Mass	Pranitha Subhash
2017	Aruvi	Anjali Varadhan
2018	Kaala	Eshwari Rao

- Best Character (Male)

Year	Movie	Awardee
2009	Achamundu Achamundu	Prasanna
2010	Naan Mahaan Alla	Jayaprakash
2015	Thani Oruvan	Thambi Ramaiah
2016	Iraivi	Radha Ravi
2017	Thupparivaalan	K. Bhagyaraj

- Best Character (Female)

Year	Movie	Awardee
2009	Siva Manasula Shakti	Urvashi
2010	Thenmerku Paruvakkaatru	Saranya Ponvannan
2016	Iraivi	Pooja Devariya
2017	Vikram Vedha	Varalaxmi Sarathkumar

- Best Comedian

Year	Movie	Awardee
2009	Guru En Aalu	Vivek
2010	Boss Engira Bhaskaran	Santhanam
2011	Mankatha	Premji Amaren
2012	Oru Kal Oru Kannadi	Santhanam
2013	Kanna Laddu Thinna Aasaiya	Powerstar Srinivasan
2014	Kaththi	Sathish
2015	Thanga Magan	Sathish
2016	Remo	Sathish
2017	Ivan Thanthiran	RJ Balaji

- Best Child Actor

Year	Movie	Awardee
2011	Deiva Thirumagal	Baby Sarah
2017	Taramani	Adrian Knight Jesly
2020	Super Deluxe	Ashwanth Ashokkumar
2022	O2, Sardar	Rithvik

- Best Villain

Year	Movie	Awardee
2012	Naan Ee	Sudeep
2013	Singam II	Rahman
2014	Jigarthanda	Bobby Simha
2015	Thani Oruvan	Arvind Swamy
2016	Theri	Mahendran
2017	Mersal	S. J. Suryah

- Best Commercial Movie

Year	Movie	Awardee
2009	Ayan	K. V. Anand
2010	Singam	Hari

- Best Romantic Movie

Year	Movie	Awardee
2009	Aadhavan	K. S. Ravikumar
2010	Goa	Venkat Prabhu

- Best Educational Movie

Year	Movie	Awardee
2012	Saattai	Anbhazhagan

- Best Patriotic Movie

Year	Movie	Awardee
2009	Peraanmai	S. P. Jananathan
2010	Madrasapattinam	A. L. Vijay

- Best Thriller Movie

Year	Movie	Awardee
2009	Eeram	Arivazhagan
2010	Aaiyirathil Oruvan	Selvaraghavan

- Award for Daring Role

Year	Movie	Awardee
2012	Aravaan	Dhansika

=== Technical awards ===
- Best Music Director

Year	Movie	Awardee
2009	Ayan	Harris Jayaraj
2010	Madrasapattinam	G. V. Prakash Kumar
2011	Ko	Harris Jayaraj
2012	Kumki	D. Imman
2013	Vanakkam Chennai	Anirudh Ravichander
2014	Kaththi	Anirudh Ravichander
2015	Naanum Rowdy Dhaan	Anirudh Ravichander
2016	Remo	Anirudh Ravichander
2017	Velaikkaran	Anirudh Ravichander

- Best Introduced Music Director

Year	Movie	Awardee
2009	Unnaipol Oruvan	Shruthi Haasan
2010	ThenMerku Paruvakkaatru	N.R.Rahunandan
2012	3	Anirudh Ravichander
2013	Idharkuthane Aasaipattai Balakumara	Siddharth Vipin
2015	Aambala	Hiphop Tamizha
2017	Aruvi	Bindu Malini; Vedanth Bharadwaj

- Best Background Score

Year	Movie	Awardee
2012	Naan	Vijay Antony
2013	Raja Rani	G. V. Prakash Kumar
2015	Vedalam	Anirudh Ravichander
2016	Kabali	Santhosh Narayanan

- Best Male Playback Singer

Year	Movie	Awardee
2009	Oru Chinna Thamarai - Vettaikaaran	Krish
2010	Hossana - Vinnaithaandi Varuvaayaa	Vijay Prakash
2011	Ennamo Yedho - Ko	Aalap Raju
2012	Venam Machan - Oru Kal Oru Kannadi	Velmurugan
2013	Paakatha - Varuthapadatha Valibar Sangam	Vijay Yesudas
2017	Aalaporaan Thamizhan - Mersal	Sathyaprakash

- Best Female Playback Singer

Year	Movie	Awardee
2009	Siragugal - Sarvam	Madhushree
2010	Adada Mazhada - Paiyaa	Saindhavi
2011	Chotta Chotta - Engeyum Eppodhum	Chinmayi
2012	Asku Laska - Nanban	Chinmayi
2013	Yaaro Ivan - Udhayam NH4	Saindhavi
2014	Kandangi Kandangi - Jilla	Shreya Ghoshal
2015	Pookkalae Sattru Oyivedungal - I	Shreya Ghoshal
2016	Pothavillaye - Mudinja Ivana Pudi	Shreya Ghoshal
2017	Senthoora- Bogan	Luksimi Sivaneswaralingam

- Best Introduced Playback Singer

Year	Movie	Awardee
2009	Nadodigal	Murugan
2010	Agam Puram	P. P. Venkat

- Best Lyricist

Year	Movie	Awardee
2009	Kulir 100°	V.Elango
2010	Enthiran	Pa.Vijay
2012	Thuppakki	Madhan Karky
2013	Udhayam NH4	Na. Muthukumar
2015	I	Madhan Karky
2016	Kabali	Arunraja Kamaraj
2017	Mersal	Vivek

- Best Director

Year	Movie	Awardee
2009	Ayan	K.V.Anand
2010	Madarasapattinam	A.L.Vijay
2011	Mankatha	Venkat Prabhu
2012	Kumki	Prabu Solomon
2013	Paradesi	Bala
2014	Madras	Pa. Ranjith
2015	Thani Oruvan	Mohan Raja
2016	Kabali	Pa. Ranjith
2017	Mersal	Atlee

- Best Debut Director

Year	Movie	Awardee
2009	Eeram	Arivazhagan
2010	Kalavani	A. Sarkunam
2011	Engeyum Eppodhum	M. Saravanan
2012	Naduvula Konjam Pakkatha Kaanom	Balaji Tharaneetharan
2013	Raja Rani	Atlee
2014	Velaiilla Pattadhari	Velraj
2015	Kuttram Kadithal	Bramma
2016	Remo	Bakkiyaraj Kannan
2017	Aruvi	Arunprabhu

- Best Art Director

Year	Movie	Awardee
2009	Vennila Kabadi Kuzhu	Susindran
2010	Enthiran	Saabu Cyril
2012	Aravaan	Vijay Murugan
2013	Vanakkam Chennai	V. Selvakumar
2017	Mersal; Velaikkaran	T. Muthuraj

- Best Cinematography

Year	Movie	Awardee
2009	Eeram	Manoj Paramhamsa
2010	Enthiran	Randy
2012	Pizza	Gopi Amaranth
2013	Irandaam Ulagam	Ramji
2017	Mersal	G. K. Vishnu

- Best Editor

Year	Movie	Awardee
2009	Sarvam	A. Sreekar Prasad
2010	Enthiran	Anthony
2012	Thuppakki	A. Sreekar Prasad
2015	Vedalam	Ruben
2017	Theeran Adhigaram Ondru	Shiva Nandeeswaran

- Best Producer

Year	Movie	Awardee
2009	Eeram	Shankar
2010	Enthiran	Kalanadhi Maran
2013	Vanakkam Chennai	Udhayanidhi Stalin
2015	Kaaka Muttai	Dhanush, Vetrimaaran

- Best Choreographer

Year	Movie	Awardee
2009	Kandaen Kadhalai	Poppy Krishna
2010	Enthiran	Prabhu Deva
2013	Biriyani	Raju Sundaram
2014	Kaththi	Shobi Paulraj
2015	Yennai Arindhaal	Sathish Krishnan
2016	Achcham Yenbadhu Madamaiyada	Sathish Krishnan
2017	Mersal; Velaikkaran	Shobi Paulraj

- Best Action

Year	Movie	Awardee
2009	Ayan	Kanal Kannan
2010	Enthiran	Peter Hein

- Best PRO (Public Relations Officer)

Year	Movie	Awardee
2009	Kandasamy	Diamond Babu
2010	Naan Mahan Alla	John
2013	Dhoom 3	Suresh Chandra

- Best Folk Song

Year	Movie	Song
2012	Kumki	Soi Soi

- Favorite Song

Year	Movie	Song
2014	Maan Karate	Open the Tasmac
2015	Anegan	Danga Maari

=== Special awards ===
- Super Star Rajini Award

Year	Film	Awardee
2011	Velayudham	Vijay

- Romantic Hero of the Year

Year	Film	Awardee
2018	Pyaar Prema Kaadhal	Harish Kalyan

- Young Inspirational Actress

Year	Film	Awardee
2018	Kanaa	Aishwarya Rajesh

- Lifetime Achievement Award

Year	Awardee
2011	L. R. Eswari

- Manidha Neyam Award

Year	Awardee
2015	Raghava Lawrence

- Best Actor in a Negative Role

Year	Awardee
2015	Arvind Swamy

- Extreme Performance - Male

Year	Movie	Awardee
2013	Paradesi	Atharvaa
2015	Kanchana 2	Raghava Lawrence

- Extreme Performance - Female

Year	Movie	Awardee
2013	Paradesi	Vedhika
2014	Kaaviya Thalaivan	Vedhika

- Enthusiastic Performer - Male

Year	Movie	Awardee
2013	6	Shaam

- Enthusiastic Performer - Female

Year	Movie	Awardee
2013	Aarambam	Taapsee Pannu
2014	Nedunchaalai	Sshivada

- Protonic Icon Award Director

Year	Movie	Awardee
2014	Naan Sigappu Manithan	Thiru

- Best Retro Actress Award

Year	Movie	Awardee
2014	Mundasupatti	Nandita

- Best Overseas Artist

Year	Movie	Awardee
2014	Maindhan	'Punnagai Poo' Gheetha

- Best Actress in a Social Awareness Movie

Year	Movie	Awardee
2015	Kaththukkutti	Srushti Dange

- Best Entertainer of the Year

Year	Movie	Awardee
2015	Kaaki Sattai	Sivakarthikeyan
2024	Aranmanai 4	Sundar C.

- Best Overseas Lyricist

Year	Movie	Awardee
2015	Amara Kaaviyam	Asmin

- Best Foreign Produced Tamil Drama

Year	Title
2012	Enna Pizhai Seithen
