= G. K. Vishnu =

Indian cinematographer

- Occupation: Cinematographer
- Years active: 2016–present
- Notable work: Mersal (2017); Bigil (2019); Jawan (2023); Karuppu (2026)
- Spouse: Mahalakshmi (m. 2021)

G. K. Vishnu is an Indian cinematographer who predominantly works in the Tamil film industry.

== Personal life ==
Vishnu married Mahalakshmi on 25 April 2021. Vishnu's brother, Vignesh, a data scientist who encouraged him to take up cinematography as a career.

== Career ==
Vishnu is a computer science engineering graduate. Before venturing into cinematography, he worked as an interface designer. He assisted Richard M. Nathan and George C. Williams in Vanakkam Chennai (2013) and Theri (2016), respectively.

== Filmography ==
=== As cinematographer ===
Year	Film	Language	Notes	Ref.
2016	Aviyal	Tamil	For the promotional song "Aviyal"	
2016	Ctrl Alt Del	Tamil	Web series	
2017	Mersal	Tamil	Debut in Tamil	
2019	Bigil			
2021	Krack	Telugu	Debut in Telugu	
2023	Ravanasura	Telugu	1 song	
2023	Jawan	Hindi	Debut in Hindi	
2026	Karuppu	Tamil		
2027	Raaka †	Telugu	Filming	

== Awards and nominations ==
Award	Date of ceremony (Note: Date is linked to the article about the awards held that year, wherever possible.)	Category	Work	Result	Ref.
Edison Awards	26 February 2018	Best Cinematographer	Mersal	Won	
South Indian International Movie Awards	14 – 15 September 2018	Best Cinematographer	Mersal	Nominated	
Techofes Awards	19 February 2018	Best Cinematographer	Mersal	Won	
Vijay Awards	3 June 2018	Best Cinematographer	Mersal	Nominated	
South Indian International Movie Awards	18 September 2021	Best Cinematographer – Tamil	Bigil	Nominated	
Filmfare Awards	28 January 2024	Best Cinematography	Jawan	Nominated	
