= Vaandu =

2019 Indian film by Vashan Shaji

- Theatrical release poster
- Directed by: Vashan Shaji
- Produced by: Vashan Shaji; N. Muniyandi; E.Mathi
- Starring: Chinu; SR Gunaa; Shigaa; Allwin; Sai Dheena
- Music by: A. R. Neshan
- Production company: MM Power Cine Creations
- Release date: 8 February 2019
- Country: India
- Language: Tamil

Vandu is a 2019 Indian action drama film directed by debutante Vashan Shaji and starring newcomers Chinu, SR Gunaa, Shigaa and Allwin with Sai Dheena in a negative role.

== Cast ==
- Chinu
- SR Guna as Guna
- Shigaa as Aparna
- Allwin as Logu
- Sai Dheena as Dheena
- Rama
- Maha Gandhi
- Ravi Shankar
- Winner Ramachandran
- Phuvaneshwari

== Production ==
The film is directed by Vashan Shaji, a former assistant to Selvaraghavan, and is inspired by street fights that used to take place in North Chennai in 1971. Malayalam actress Shigaa plays the heroine while Sai Dheena portrays the antagonist. Several newcomers play the lead roles. The film is set in the present day and was shot in Chennai for 63 days.

== Soundtrack ==
The songs were composed by A. R. Neshan.

No.	Title	Singer(s)	Length
1.	"Korukkupettai"	Gana Bala	4:24
2.	"Yendi Unna Pethen"	Jagadish	1:10
3.	"Aakku Isokku"	Malathi	4:00
4.	"Karuppu Vellai"	Sivam	4:49
5.	"Theme Music"		2:19
Total length:			16:42

== Release ==
A critic from the Cinema Express gave the film a rating of one out of five stars and wrote that "the performances aren’t convincing enough to make us buy into the conflict, and overall this looks like a short film that has been shot on a small budget".
