= Sai Dheena =

Indian actor

- Born: M. G. Sai Dheena
- Other names: Dheena, Boxer Dheena, Stunt Dheena
- Occupation: Actor
- Years active: 2004–present

Sai Dheena is an Indian actor who has appeared in Tamil language films, playing antagonistic and sometimes comedic roles. He played the antagonist in Attu (2017), Thimiru Pudichavan (2018) and Vaandu (2019). He is a frequent collaborator with Atlee.

== Career ==
Sai Dheena worked as a signboard artist, then moved to a job in the railways, before moving on to appear as a henchman in films, followed by playing supporting roles. He made his debut in Kamal Haasan's Virumaandi (2004) as a jail warden, after being spotted by the actor where he went to work as an extra henchman in the film. He has since starred in films including Shankar's Enthiran (2010), Atlee's Theri (2016), and Vetrimaaran's Vada Chennai (2018). He portrayed the antagonist in Thimiru Pudichavan (2018). In a review of the film Sagaa (2019) by the New Indian Express, the critic noted that he "plays the role with meticulous intensity".

== Philanthropy ==
In 2017, Dheena received attention from the media for financially helping out actor Viruchagakanth (aka Pallu Babu) of Kaadhal (2004) fame. Viruchagakanth had been begging at temples in Chennai. Dheena, along with actor Abi Saravanan and director Mohan, was able to help the actor. During the coronavirus outbreak, Dheena assisted 250 families with food, including rice, wheat, and sambar.

== Filmography ==
=== Tamil films ===
Year	Film	Role	Notes
2004	Virumaandi	Jail warden	
2006	Pudhupettai	Anbu's henchman	
2006	Thalainagaram	Qassim Bhai's henchman	Uncredited role
2006	Vettaiyaadu Vilaiyaadu	Goon	Uncredited role
2010	Enthiran	Sekar	
2010	Kattradhu Kalavu	Pottu	
2010	Aaranya Kaandam	Gajapathy	
2010	Va	Vettu	
2013	Raja Rani	Bully	
2014	Endrendrum		
2014	Sarabham	Sekhar	
2014	Burma	Broker Ravi	
2015	Komban	Santhanakalai	
2015	Indru Netru Naalai	Marthandam's henchman	
2015	Kirumi	Shankar	
2015	Vaalu	Dheena	
2015	Bhooloham	Arumugam's henchman	
2016	Jil Jung Juk	Attack Albert	
2016	Kanithan	Bhai	
2016	Theri	Rogue (Pulippu)	
2017	Maanagaram	P. K. Pandian's henchman	
2017	Attu	Pulinathope Jaya	
2017	Theru Naaigal	Settu	
2017	Hara Hara Mahadevaki		
2017	Mersal	Prisoner	
2017	Kodiveeran	Police officer	
2017	Maayavan	Dheena	
2018	Mannar Vagaiyara		
2018	Pakka	Singapore Groom	
2018	Seyal	Seva	
2018	Annanukku Jai	Selva	
2018	Vada Chennai	"Jawa" Pazhani	
2018	Thimiru Pudichavan	Meesai Padma	
2018	Thuppakki Munai	Brahmaraja's henchman	
2019	Vaandu	Dheena	
2019	Sagaa	Jail Warden	
2019	Bigil	Dheena	
2019	Kanchana 3	Dheena	
2021	Master	Juvenile school warden	
2021	Kabadadaari	Mechanic	
2021	Aatkal Thevai		
2021	Call Taxi	Criminal	
2021	Border		
2021	Naruvi		
2022	Etharkkum Thunindhavan	Inspector Moses Michael Faraday	
2022	Kichi Kichi		
2022	Gulu Gulu	Police Inspector	
2022	Ottam		
2022	Gurumoorthi	Dheena	
2023	Pallu Padama Paathukka	Abishek Raja	
2023	Agilan	Dilli	
2023	Ellaam Mela Irukuravan Paathuppan	Rajaali / Alien	Dual role
2023	Rudhran	Shankar	
2023	Regina	Robber Dina	
2023	DD Returns	Mathi	
2023	Sarakku		
2024	Pagalariyaan	Ganapathy	
2024	Haraa	Police Inspector	
2024	The Boys	Police Inspector	
2024	Jolly O Gymkhana	Pottu Bhavani	
2024	Mayan		
2025	Leg Piece		
2025	Retro	Dheena	
2025	Guts		
2025	Maayakoothu	Dhanapal	
2025	Kathuvaakula Oru Kadhal		
2025	Padaiyaanda Maaveeraa	Inspector Gnanam	
2025	Kutram Thavir	Manivanan	
2026	Valluvan		
2026	Charukesi	Police Inspector	

=== Other language films ===
Year	Film	Role	Language	Notes
2021	Kapatadhaari	Mechanic	Telugu	
2021	Republic	Guna	Telugu	
2022	Godfather	Prisoner	Telugu	
2023	Dasara	Bangaram	Telugu	
2023	Jawan	Kalee's henchmen	Hindi	Partially reshot in Tamil
2024	Shivam Bhaje	Vincent	Telugu	
2025	Maine Pyar Kiya		Malayalam	
2025	Akhanda 2: Thaandavam	Goon	Telugu	

=== Television ===
Year	Shows	Role	Channel	Notes
2024	Top Cooku Dupe Cooku (season 1)	Contestant	Sun TV	
