= Theri (film) =

2016 film directed by Atlee

- Theatrical release poster
- Directed by: Atlee
- Screenplay by: Atlee
- Dialogues by: Atlee; S. Ramana Girivasan
- Story by: Atlee
- Produced by: Kalaipuli S. Thanu
- Starring: Vijay; Samantha Ruth; Amy Jackson
- Cinematography: George C. Williams
- Edited by: Ruben
- Music by: G. V. Prakash Kumar
- Production company: V Creations
- Distributed by: SPI Cinemas (Tamil Nadu); Sri Venkateswara Creations (Andhra Pradesh and Telangana): Friday Film House and Carnival Motion Pictures (Kerala) SouthSide Studios (Karnataka)
- Release date: 14 April 2016
- Running time: 157 minutes
- Country: India
- Language: Tamil
- Budget: ₹75 crore
- Box office: ₹150 crore

Theri (transl. Spark) is a 2016 Indian Tamil-language action thriller film directed by Atlee and produced by Kalaipuli S. Thanu under the banner V Creations. Loosely inspired from the 1990 Tamil film Chatriyan and the 2013 Hollywood film Homefront, the film stars Vijay, Samantha Ruth Prabhu, Amy Jackson, Nainika. The music was composed by G. V. Prakash Kumar, with cinematography handled by George C. Williams and editing by Ruben. In the film, a former cop is on a mission to protect his daughter from his past enemies.

The film marked Kumar's second directorial after Raja Rani (2013), whose success impressed Vijay enough to work with the director. Atlee came up with the script, which was an "emotional action thriller film," and a formal announcement was made in September 2014. After post-production work and a formal launch ceremony in June 2015, the film began production in Chennai in early July. The film was halted twice due to the Film Employees Federation of South India's strike and the heavy flooding in Chennai. In addition, poor climatic conditions in China meant that the team had to abandon their idea of filming sequences there and instead opt to shoot in Bangkok. Despite the difficulties, the film was completed in January 2016.

Theri was released on 14 April 2016 to positive reviews from critics and grossed ₹150 crore (US$16 million) against a budget of ₹75 crore (US$7.8 million). The film emerged as the second highest-grossing Tamil film of 2016. It further won three SIIMA Awards, three IIFA Utsavam Awards, two Ananda Vikatan Cinema Awards and nine nominations at the 64th Filmfare Awards South. The film was adapted into Sinhala as Goree (2019) and Assamese as Ratnakar (2019). The film was remade in Hindi as Baby John (2024). It is currently considered one of the most popular films in Vijay's career, and its multiple re-runs on television channels have contributed to its popularity.

== Plot ==
Joseph Kuruvilla is a soft-spoken bakery owner who leads a quiet, unassuming life with his five-year-old daughter, Niveditha ("Nivi"), in Alappuzha, Kerala. He builds a warm friendship with Nivi's schoolteacher, Annie, who secretly harbors romantic feelings for him. Joseph’s peaceful existence is upended when a group of rogue elements targets Nivi. He effortlessly neutralizes the attackers, revealing an exceptional level of combat prowess that forces Annie to realize he is hiding his true identity. Joseph subsequently discloses his past to her, revealing that he is actually DCP Vijay Kumar, a legendary former police officer from Chennai.

In a flashback, Years prior in Chennai, Vijay investigates the disappearance of an IT professional named Raji, uncovering that she had been tortured, sexually assaulted, and murdered. His investigation leads directly to Ashwin, the son of the powerful and ruthless Labour Minister, Vanamaamalai, but the latter and Police Commissioner Sibi Chakravarthy claim Ashwin has been missing for days. Ultimately, Ashwin is found dead, revealed to have been tortured to death by Vijay. Vijay directly informs Vanamaamalai of his role in the murder, prompting the corrupt minister to swear a blood feud against him.

During this tumultuous period, Vijay falls in love with Mithra, a medical student. Following a violent ambush by Vanamaamalai's brother, Ratnam, a shaken Mithra requests that Vijay resign from the police force. He manages to reassure her, and they subsequently marry, welcoming their newborn daughter, Nivi. However, on the night of Diwali, Vanamaamalai, Ratnam, and a corrupt police inspector named Karikalan launch a brutal home invasion. They murder Vijay's mother and Mithra, and attempt to drown infant Nivi. A mortally wounded Mithra manages to rescue Nivi from the water, extracting a dying promise from Vijay to abandon his profession for their daughter's safety. To honor his wife's final wish and safeguard Nivi, Vijay fakes his own death and vanishes into deep cover.

In the present, Vanamaamalai discovers that Vijay and his daughter survived the massacre. Seeking to eliminate them, the minister orchestrates a catastrophic sabotage of Nivi's school excursion bus. Armed with assistance from Annie and the local community, Vijay successfully rescues his daughter and the other stranded children. Recognizing that Vanamaamalai will never stop hunting his family, Vijay breaks his vow of non-violence to wage a calculated war of retribution. He returns to Chennai, executes Karikalan, and leaves his corpse suspended from a police station ceiling. An eyewitness constable spreads rumors that Vijay's ghost has returned to haunt his killers.

Vanamaamalai attempts to warn his estranged brother, but Ratnam dismisses the threat, mistakenly believing Vanamaamalai is staging the killings to intimidate him. That night, Vijay corners Ratnam at an under-construction high-rise and throws him to his death. To infiltrate the minister's final stronghold, Vijay intentionally allows himself to be captured by Vanamaamalai's remaining mercenaries. Once inside the compound, he breaks free, kills the guards, and executes Vanamaamalai, hanging his body from the ceiling to mirror his brother's fate. While the vigilante killings remain a complete mystery to the general public, Commissioner Sibi Chakravarthy—who is revealed to have quietly protected Vijay's secret all along—officially re-enlists him into active service.

Years later, an older Nivi, Annie, and Vijay live together as a tightly-knit family in the serene landscapes of Ladakh. Operating under the new alias Dharmeshwar, Vijay contentedly balances his peaceful family life with a clandestine role, utilizing his immense investigative expertise to secretly assist the Central Bureau of Investigation in solving high-profile cases.

== Cast ==
- Vijay as DCP A. Vijay Kumar IPS / Joseph Kuruvilla / Dharmeshwar
- Samantha Ruth Prabhu as Mithra, Vijay's wife and Nivi's mother
- Amy Jackson as Annie, Nivi's teacher (Voice dubbed by Raveena Ravi)
- Nainika as Niveditha alias Nivi, Vijay and Mithra's daughter
  - Dhivya Sasha as teenage Niveditha (cameo appearance)
- Radhika Sarathkumar as Pappu, Vijay's mother
- Mahendran as Vanamaamalai
- Prabhu as Commissioner G. Cibi Chakravarthi
- Rajendran as P. Rajender
- Azhagam Perumal as Ratnam, Vanamaamalai's younger brother
- Kaali Venkat as Ganesan, a police constable
- Shreekumar as ACP
- Manobala as a school principal
- Stun Siva as ACP Karikalan
- Kumar Natarajan as Ramakrishnan, Mithra's father
- Ayra as Pallavi, Mithra's sister
- Niharika as Mithra's and Pallavi's aunt
- Kalyani Natarajan as a forensic examiner
- Swaminathan as Vijay's prospective bride's father
- Sugunthan as Isaac
- Prinz Nithik as Chetan's henchman
- Soundararaja as Karthik
- Sai Dheena as Pulippu, a child trafficker
- Bineesh Bastin as Chetan's henchman
- R.K. Abinav as Pandy Kutti
- Aathma Patrick as Vanamaamalai's henchman
- R. S. G. Chelladurai as Raji's father
- T. Muthuraj as Chetan
- Amritha Aiyer as Mithra's friend (uncredited)

Cameo appearance

- Sunaina as Vijay's prospective bride

== Production ==
=== Development ===
In January 2014, Vijay expressed his interest to work with a project directed by Atlee, after being impressed by his debut directorial film Raja Rani (2013); the latter also expected to work in the film, since he had been a fan of the actor, and also admired his recent projects. Kalaipuli S. Thanu was reported to finance the project and was officially announced in September 2014. The producers further announced that the team would start filming only after the completion of Vijay's other film Puli (2015), while Atlee continued to script the film through late-2014. In November 2014, G. V. Prakash Kumar was announced as the music composer collaborating with Vijay and Atlee again, after Thalaivaa and Raja Rani. Several of the technical crew involved in Atlee's previous film, Raja Rani, were also added to the team including cinematographer George C. Williams, editor Ruben and art director T. Muthuraj. The film is touted to be an emotional-action thriller where Vijay would essay the role of a police officer and a father in the film, and was reported to be inspired from Chatriyan (1990). Several titles for the film including Moondru Mugam, Vetri, Thuppaki 2, Khakee and Thaarumaaru were considered, before the makers finalised Theri in late November 2015. The first look of the film was also released on that date.

=== Casting ===
Nayanthara, in January 2015, the actress refuted claims of being part in the film. Later, Samantha Ruth Prabhu was announced as the female lead. Amy Jackson was reportedly essayed the role of a Malayalam-speaking school teacher in the film. Initially, the team approached few Hindi actresses for Jackson's role, whom had turned down the offer. In March 2015, veteran actress and film producer Radhika Sarathkumar was essayed the role of Vijay's mother in the film, collaborating with Vijay for the second time after 27 years. (Note: Vijay and Radhika Sarathkumar worked for the first time in Ithu Engal Neethi directed by his father S. A. Chandrashekhar. He also played a child artist in the film.) Bharathiraja refused on being a part of the film and led Atlee choose veteran director Mahendran as the antagonist. Prabhu also to play a role. Sunaina was also roped in to play an extended cameo in the film. Actress Amritha Aiyer, appeared in an uncredited role playing Samantha's friend. (Note: Amritha Aiyer, played a crucial role in Bigil, which also starred Vijay, and was directed by Atlee.)

=== Filming ===
An official launch event was held at the Kerala Club House on the East Coast Road in Chennai, with several members of the cast and crew in attendance on 26 June 2015. The film began production in Chennai during early-July 2015 and an introductory song for Vijay was shot in the city, followed by scenes featuring Vijay and Samantha on the East Coast Road. Further scenes in Chennai were shot at Adityaram Studios and at Binny Mills, where art director T. Muthuraj had erected a huge set. Radhika was also a part of the shoot, while actress Sunaina shot for one day in the schedule which ended in mid-July. The second schedule was reported to begin during the end of the month, was briefly delayed owing to a strike held by the Tamil Film Producers Council against Film Employees Federation of South India.

The second schedule for the film restarted in Chennai on 3 August 2015, with Vijay and Samantha joining the shoot and went for 25 days. Few sequences were also shot at MGM Dizzee World on the East Coast Road. In mid-September, the team shot few sequences at veteran actor Sivaji Ganesan's ancestral house Annai Illam and the shoot went for 2–3 days. In November 2015, it was revealed that the film was "seventy percent complete" and portions involving Samantha Prabhu had finished being shot. Thereafter, Amy Jackson subsequently joined the team in Chennai to shoot for her part during a new schedule. Action scenes, choreographed by Dhilip Subbarayan were filmed throughout the month, with the shoot disrupted by the heavy flooding in Chennai.

Hollywood stunt choreographer Kaloyan Vodenicharov worked with the team in early December 2015 to help shoot the climax portions for the film. Poor climatic conditions in China meant that the team had to abandon their idea of filming sequences there and instead opted to shoot in Bangkok. Sets were erected in a factory in Chennai to shoot the climax scenes, with Kaloyan recruited to help train artistes and film the sequences during December 2015. In mid-January 2016, an under water stunt sequence was filmed under the guidance of Subbrarayan. The team started filming a song featuring Vijay and Jackson, and with the completion of the song, the principal photography was wrapped.

== Music ==
Soon after his inclusion in the project, Prakash started composing the songs during November 2014 and completed work within January 2016. In his micro-blogging page, the composer said that all the tracks in the film are "trend-setting", and featured songs recorded by veteran composer Deva, actor-director T. Rajendar, Uthara Unnikrishnan and the actor Vijay himself. It was released on 20 March 2016 by Think Music. The release coincided with a promotional event held at Sathyam Cinemas in Chennai, with the presence of the cast and crew. Irrespective of the full songs, a bonus track titled "Hey Aasmaan" was released on 10 April 2016.

== Marketing ==
Promotional stills from the film released on 15 January 2016, coinciding with Pongal. The teaser which was initially uploaded on the midnight of 5 February, was removed after copyright claims from an anonymous channel, but was later restored by the technical team. The teaser received praise from fans and celebrities, and garnered 1.5 million views within 24 hours of its release.

The promotions of the film began during 14 March 2016, with the team releasing special posters ahead of the audio launch on 20 March. A month before its release, SPI Cinemas, which acquired the distribution rights of the film, started pre-bookings of the film in theatres, months before its release. The pre-booking facilities were affiliated to theatres owned by SPI Cinemas – which include Sathyam, Escape and S2 Theatres. It has reported that, the active campaigning by the fans of Vijay through social media, with the extensive promotions had attributed to the hype, with Abirami Ramanathan, managing director of Abirami Multiplex, said that more than 6,000 tickets have been sold for the first five days of its release.

== Release ==
=== Theatrical ===
==== Screening and statics ====
Film released with 144 screens across United States. CineGalaxy Inc, which had distributed the film in United States, stated that it is the "biggest release for a Vijay-film in recent years".

=== Distribution ===
Karnataka theatrical rights were purchased by Goldie Films, with Kerala rights were purchased by Friday Film House and Carnival Motion Pictures at ₹5.6 crore, highest for a non-Malayalam film. Dil Raju's Sri Venkateswara Creations procured the theatrical rights in the Andhra and Telangana regions. CineGalaxy Inc, a Texas-based distribution company acquired the theatrical rights in the United States for ₹3 crore.

=== Legal issues ===
The film was not screened in many theatres across Chengalpet, owing to the issues between the producers and distributors over profit-sharing. Eventually, the distributors were reluctant to buy the film under Minimum-guarantee (MG) basis, due to the losses of big-budget Tamil films in the recent years, with Lingaa (2014) in particular, where the film had incurred huge losses to the film's distributors.

Another sources claimed that there held a raid in Chengalpet theatres, following complaints of overpricing of ticket rates. It has been stated that the film's release had coincided with the period of Tamil Nadu Legislative Assembly election, where the moral code of conduct was in force and huge complaints from audiences, a huge crackdown was imitated by the authorities against the theatre owners selling tickets above the government-stipulated rates. Many of them feared selling tickets at higher rates as it may lead to suspension of the theatre licence. As a result, the theatre owners were reluctant to pay high MG rates as it cannot be recovered on normal ticket rates.

Producer K. E. Gnanavel Raja supported Thanu's decision, and said that the films he had distributed – Suriya's 24 and Singam 3 – will face boycott in the Chengalpet region, if the issue had not cleared. Thanu also blamed the "theatre mafia" saying that "the middlemen and brokers is trying to take over the business with this issue". On 29 April 2016, the film was screened in Chengalpet, two weeks after the original release, as the talks with the producers and stakeholders became fruitful, leading to resolve the issue.

=== Piracy ===
On 15 April 2016, a group of actor Vijay's fans caught a videographer for recording the film at a theatre in Coimbatore for piracy purposes. It was revealed that he along with two of other members, were working at a Tamil-language television channel, Polimer TV and the pirated footage of one-and-a-half hour was handed by the videographer to the television staff. Reacting to the issue, the Tamil Film Producers Council and the sister associations of Tamil film fraternity sued the channel for the illegitimate piracy. However, the channel refuted and claimed that they had never indulged in video piracy. A bus driver, named Shankar was booked by the police, for buying pirated versions of the film (along with Suriya's 24) stored in DVDs and screened at a private luxury bus. Apparently Shankar stated that the bus owner had nothing to do with the pirated DVDs.

=== Home media ===
The satellite rights of this film, along with Thanu's other production Kabali, were remained unsold. In March 2016, it has been reported that Star Vijay and Jaya TV were considered for acquiring the television rights of the film, which did not happen. In November 2016, following its launch in India, Amazon Prime Video had acquired the digital rights of the two films and streamed them exclusively through the platform. The film premiered exclusively on 18 October 2017, on Sun TV coinciding with Diwali.

== Reception ==
=== Box office ===
In the opening day of its release, the film had collected ₹18.1 crore at the domestic box office and ₹39.96 crore worldwide.

At-the end of June 2016, the film crossed ₹150 crore (US$16 million) at the box-office, becoming Vijay's first film in his career to enter the 150-crore club

=== Critical response ===
M. Suganth of The Times of India gave 3/5 stars and wrote "A cop story that is entertaining despite being predictable and [a formulaic film] can be best described only with another cliché — old wine in a fancy, extra-large bottle." Kirubhakar Purushothaman of India Today gave 3/5 stars and wrote "Theri is a film you go to with battalions of friends or family on a weekend, and come back without giving it a second thought". Sify gave 3/5 stars and wrote "Theri is strictly escapist fun...a satisfying Vijay masala entertainer."

Gautaman Bhaskaran of Hindustan Times gave 2.5/5 stars and wrote "Theri has all the essentials one expects in a Vijay starrer, but central to the film is the father-daughter relationship and that’s where the film scores big." Anupama Subramanian of Deccan Chronicle gave 2.5/5 stars and wrote "The mass movie will be well savored by Ilayathalapathy’s ardent fans."

Latha Srinivasan of DNA gave 2.5/5 stars and wrote "Vijay fans will find the movie delightful, others may not". Goutham VS of The Indian Express gave 2/5 stars and wrote "The movie, possibly the millionth remake of Rajnikanth’s revenge film Baashha, where the hero is a daredevil with a larger-than-life persona, is yawn-inducing". Baradwaj Rangan of The Hindu wrote "Atlee's screenplay checks all boxes and we're checking these boxes 10 minutes ahead of him."

=== Accolades ===
Award (Note: Awards, festivals and organizations are in alphabetical order.)	Date of ceremony (Note: Date is linked to the article about the awards held that year, wherever possible.)	Category	Recipient(s)	Result	Ref.
Ananda Vikatan Cinema Awards	13 January 2017	Best Child Actor	Nainika	Won	
Ananda Vikatan Cinema Awards	13 January 2017	Best Stunt Choreography	Dhilip Subbarayan, Kaloyan Vodenicharov	Won	
Behindwoods Gold Medal	12 June 2017	People's Choice Actor – Female	Samantha Ruth Prabhu	Won	
Behindwoods Gold Medal	12 June 2017	People's Choice Director	Atlee	Won	
Behindwoods Gold Medal	12 June 2017	Best PRO	Diamond Babu, Riaz K. Ahmed (also for Kabali)	Won	
Filmfare Awards South	17 June 2017	Best Film – Tamil	Kalaipuli S. Thanu	Nominated	
Filmfare Awards South	17 June 2017	Best Director – Tamil	Atlee	Nominated	
Filmfare Awards South	17 June 2017	Best Actor – Tamil	Vijay	Nominated	
Filmfare Awards South	17 June 2017	Best Actress – Tamil	Samantha Ruth Prabhu	Nominated	
Filmfare Awards South	17 June 2017	Best Supporting Actor – Tamil	J. Mahendran	Nominated	
Filmfare Awards South	17 June 2017	Best Supporting Actor – Tamil	Rajendran	Nominated	
Filmfare Awards South	17 June 2017	Best Supporting Actress – Tamil	Radhika Sarathkumar	Nominated	
Filmfare Awards South	17 June 2017	Best Music Director – Tamil	G. V. Prakash Kumar	Nominated	
Filmfare Awards South	17 June 2017	Best Female Playback Singer – Tamil	Neeti Mohan – (for "Chella Kutti")	Nominated	
Filmfare Awards South	17 June 2017	Best Supporting Actress – Tamil	Nainika	Won	
Filmfare Awards South	17 June 2017	Best Actor in a Negative Role – Tamil	J. Mahendran	Won	
South Indian International Movie Awards	30 June–1 July 2017	Best Film – Tamil	Kalaipuli S. Thanu	Nominated	
South Indian International Movie Awards	30 June–1 July 2017	Best Director – Tamil	Atlee	Won	
South Indian International Movie Awards	30 June–1 July 2017	Best Actor – Tamil	Vijay	Nominated	
South Indian International Movie Awards	30 June–1 July 2017	Best Actress – Tamil	Samantha Ruth Prabhu	Nominated	
South Indian International Movie Awards	30 June–1 July 2017	Best Actress in a Supporting Role – Tamil	Radhika Sarathkumar	Nominated	
South Indian International Movie Awards	30 June–1 July 2017	Best Actor in a Negative Role – Tamil	J. Mahendran	Nominated	

== Impact ==
Theri has been considered as one of the popular films of Vijay in the recent times. It also led to the repeated collaborations between Atlee and Vijay, where they went to work on Mersal (2017) and Bigil (2019). However, Atlee still stated it as "one of his favourite films in his career". On 14 April 2021, during the film's fifth anniversary, Atlee tweeted a thread of stills from the films, praising the actor, actress, crew and producer for the film, while also referring it as "close to his heart". The film emerged popularity over multiple re-runs on television channels and had garnered record impressions; apart from the original, the Hindi-dubbed version of the film gained popularity in televisions and the Bengali-dubbed version has received a great response on the Bongo OTT platform. It was re-released in Tamil Nadu theatres on 21 June 2019, ahead of the actor's 45th birthday. Indian cricketer Ravindra Jadeja, stated Theri as his favourite film at an interview to his fans. During the COVID-19 lockdown in India, a group of Tamil Nadu Police members performed a parody version of the song "Jithu Jilladi" to create awareness to control the pandemic.

== Remakes ==
The 2016 Tamil film Theri has inspired several adaptations across different languages. It was partially remade in Sinhala as Goree (2019), directed by Harsha Udakanda, and in Assamese as Ratnakar (2019), directed by Jatin Bora. Both films retained the action-thriller essence of the original while adapting it to their cultural contexts.

In Hindi, Theri was remade as Baby John (2024) directed by Kalees starring Varun Dhawan and marking the Hindi debut of Keerthy Suresh. Additionally, a Telugu adaptation titled Ustaad Bhagat Singh, directed by Harish Shankar and featuring Pawan Kalyan in the titular role, is currently in production.
