= T. Muthuraj =

Film production designer

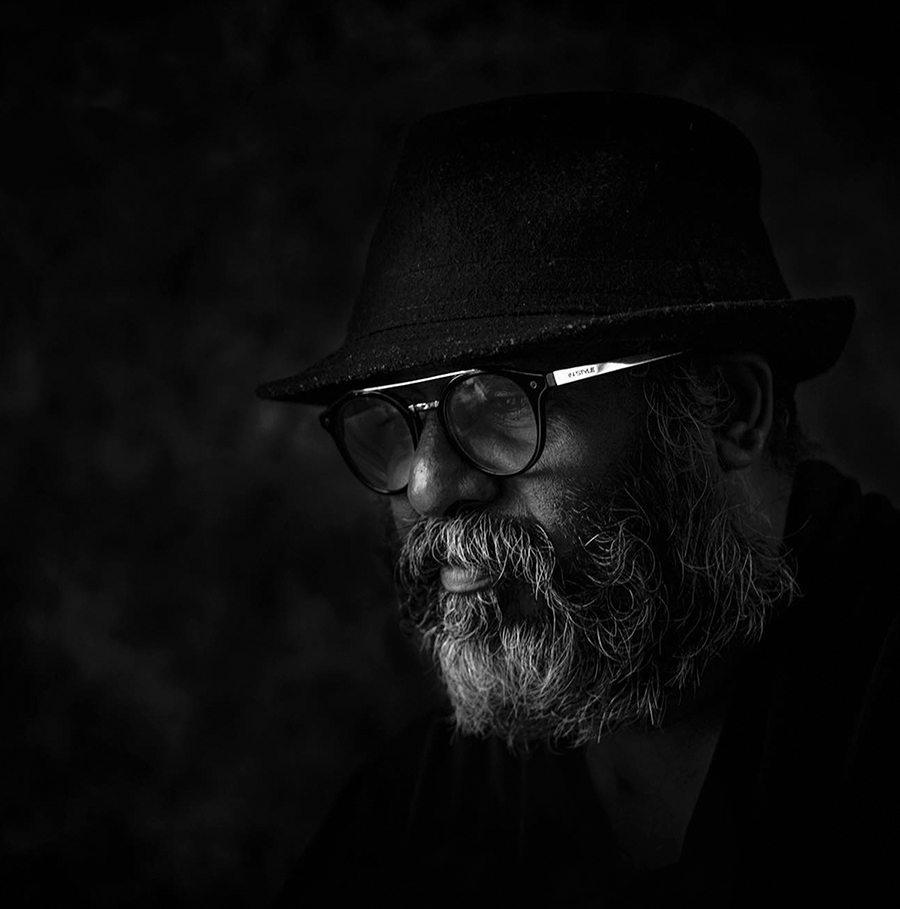
- Born: 29 July 1969 (age 57); Coimbatore, Tamil Nadu, India
- Occupation: Production Designer
- Known for: Production design
- Notable work: Guru (1997); I (2015); Mersal (2017); Velaikkaran (2017); 2.0 (2018); Bigil (2019)
- Website: www.tmuthuraj.in

T. Muthuraj (born 29 July 1969 in Coimbatore, India) is an Indian film production designer who works in predominantly Malayalam and Tamil films. He is well known for his collaborations with directors S. Shankar and Atlee Kumar.

== Early life and education ==
He graduated from the Government College of Fine Arts, Chennai in 1991 and was the first assistant of Sabu Cyril.

== Career ==
His big break came in the 1997 Malayalam film Guru starring Mohanlal and Suresh Gopi, directed by Rajiv Anchal, for which he received the Kerala State Film Award for Best Art Director.

Muthuraj has since worked in such path breaking hits as Arputha Theevu, Angadi theru, Pazhasi Raja, Irumbukottai Murattu Singham, Avan Ivan, I, Theri, Mersal, Velaikkaran, Bigil, 2.0 etc.

He has contributed to the success of 60 plus feature films and 185 commercials. His work in Nanban (2012) directed by Shankar, had won huge appreciation from all quarters.

== Filmography ==
- Butterflies (1993)
- Yuvathurki (1996)
- Guru (1997)
- Chitrashalabham (1998)
- Chinthavishtayaya Shyamala (1998)
- Olympiyan Anthony Adam (1999)
- Priyamanavale (2000)
- Millennium Stars (2000)
- Devadoothan (2000)
- Solla Marandha Kadhai (2002)
- Punnagai Poove (2003)
- Naam (2003)
- Varnajalam (2004)
- Alice in Wonderland (2005)
- Athbhutha Dweepu (2005)
- Thirumagan (2007)
- Ore Kadal (2007)
- Kanna (2007)
- Pazhassi Raja (2009)
- Angadi Theru (2010)
- Ponnar Shankar (2011)
- Avan Ivan (2011)
- Nanban (2012)
- Raja Rani (2013)
- Oru Kanniyum Moonu Kalavaanikalum (2014)
- Arima Nambi (2014)
- I (2015)
- Puli (2015)
- Theri (2016)
- Remo (2016)
- Mersal (2017)
- Velaikkaran (2017)
- 2.0 (2018)
- Bigil (2019)
- Jawan (2023) (Hindi)
- Ayalaan (2024)
- Indian 2 (2024)
- Baththa (2026)

== Awards ==
- 1997 – Kerala State Film Award for Best Art Director for Guru
- 1997 – Padmarajan Award
- 1997 – Film Fraternity Award
- 1998 – Film Critics Award
- 2000 – MathruBhumi Award
- 2000 – Film Critics Award
- 2009 – Kerala State Film Award, Best Art Director
- 2010 – MathruBhumi Award
- 2010 – Variety Award
- 2011 – Surya Award
- 2012 – Edison Award
- 2018 - Vijay Award for Best Art Direction - Velaikkaran
