= Raja Rani (2013 film) =

2013 film directed by Atlee

- Theatrical release poster
- Directed by: Atlee
- Written by: Atlee
- Produced by: A. R. Murugadoss
- Starring: Arya; Jai; Nayanthara; Nazriya Nazim
- Cinematography: George C. Williams
- Edited by: Ruben
- Music by: G. V. Prakash Kumar
- Production company: A. R. Murugadoss Productions
- Distributed by: Fox Star Studios
- Release date: 27 September 2013
- Running time: 164 minutes
- Country: India
- Language: Tamil

Raja Rani (transl. The King and Queen) is a 2013 Indian Tamil-language romantic comedy drama film written and directed by Atlee, and produced by A. R. Murugadoss. The film stars Arya, Jai, Nayanthara and Nazriya Nazim, while Santhanam, Sathyan and Sathyaraj appear in supporting roles. It follows a couple who are reluctantly married, and slowly fall in love after learning of each other's past.

Raja Rani is the feature directorial debut of Atlee. Filming began in October 2012 and ended in August 2013. The film was released on 27 September 2013 and became a commercial success. It won several accolades, including four Tamil Nadu State Film Awards and two Filmfare Awards South from four nominations. The film was remade in Bengali as Shudhu Tomari Jonyo (2015), and in Sinhala as Sihinayaki Adare (2024).

== Plot ==
John and Regina enter an arranged marriage solely to appease their respective parents. They live together as estranged roommates in their apartment, with John deliberately returning home intoxicated every night to alienate Regina, who responds by applying for a corporate transfer to Australia. Their routine is disrupted when Regina suddenly suffers an epileptic seizure. At the hospital, John's inebriated state leaves him unable to provide the medical team with her basic health history. Rebuked by the attending physician for his negligence, a sobered John later questions Regina about her condition, prompting her to reveal her past.

During her college years, Regina was in a deeply committed relationship with Surya, a call centre employee who was subsequently selected for airline crew training in the United States (US). Facing fierce opposition from Surya's father, the couple planned a secret registry wedding before his departure. However, Surya failed to appear at the registrar's office. Regina and her supportive father, James, visited Surya's residence only to discover that he had already departed for the US. Shortly thereafter, Surya's friend Aiyappan informed Regina that Surya had committed suicide, a shock that triggered her very first epileptic seizure. Three years later, wanting to alleviate her father's lingering guilt and distress over her prolonged grief, Regina finally agreed to the marriage proposal from John's family.

Moved by her vulnerability, John develops a profound respect for Regina, though she remains emotionally distant. To bridge the widening gap, John's best friend, Sarathy, steps in to share John's past with Regina. Years prior, John had fallen in love with a young woman named Keerthana. Despite an initial rejection, Keerthana eventually reciprocated his affection, and the two were wed. However, Keerthana was killed in a car accident the morning after their wedding. Devastated by witnessing her death, John vowed never to remarry, spending four years in isolation until Sarathy finally convinced him to give life a second chance, resulting in his marriage to Regina.

Learning of John's loss, Regina develops genuine feelings for him, yet both remain too hesitant to confess their mutual affection. On John's birthday, Regina presents him with a personal gift, which John quietly discards under the bed, mistakenly assuming it is a superficial gesture meant only to appease James. Misunderstandings escalate further when Regina's Australian transfer is approved. When she attempts to connect with him on the terrace, John misinterprets her words as a prelude to an amicable divorce. A heartbroken Regina prepares to leave, and John drives her to the airport the following morning.

At the terminal, Regina spots Surya at the immigration counter and alerts John. Seeking to secure her happiness, John rushes inside to confront Surya, urging him to take Regina back. Surya reveals the truth: his father had coerced his departure, and he had intentionally faked his suicide through Aiyappan so Regina could move on with her life. Although Surya claims to John that he is now happily married, he secretly retains a ring gifted by Regina, resolving to live alone with her memory.

When John returns to Regina, she angrily rebukes him, explaining that she has long outgrown her past and is entirely in love with him. She prompts him to open her discarded birthday gift, which contains a note reading, "Let's begin our life." John finally confesses his love. Regina playfully references an inside romantic joke from John's past with Keerthana, confirming her complete understanding and acceptance of his history. The couple reconciles.

== Cast ==
- Arya as John
- Jai as Surya Muthuraman
- Nayanthara as Regina
- Nazriya Nazim as Keerthana
- Santhanam as Sarathy
- Sathyan as Aiyappan
- Sathyaraj as James
- Manobala as Ramamoorthy
- Singamuthu as Vettukili
- Rajendran as Henry
- Dhanya as Nivitha
- Meesha Ghoshal as Madhu
- Arunraja as Udumbe
- Wong as John's friend
- Swaminathan as Venkadathri
- Chelladurai as a marriage registration official
- Pandian as Surya's father
- Jangiri Madhumitha as Regina's college mate
- Prema Priya as Udumbe's girlfriend
- T. M. Karthik as Booshan
- Sai Dheena as a bully in a cameo appearance
- K. Bujji Babu as Narayanan
- Pradeep Kottayam as Nivitha's father (uncredited)
- Gana Bala (cameo appearance in the song "Hey Baby"; uncredited)

== Production ==
=== Development ===
Raja Rani marked the feature directorial debut of Atlee, an assistant director to Shankar. The film was produced by A. R. Murugadoss, has art direction by T. Muthuraj and cinematography by debutant George C. Williams, a former associate of Nirav Shah.

=== Casting ===
Arya and Nayanthara were signed on as the lead pair, reuniting after Boss Engira Bhaskaran (2010). Atlee initially wanted Sivakarthikeyan to portray the role that eventually went Jai. Nani said he was considered for Arya's role, but he did not have the dates. Nazriya Nazim announced her inclusion in May 2013. Sathyaraj said he accepted to act in the film because he liked the modernity of the script.

=== Filming ===
The first filming schedule began in October 2012 at a bungalow in Greams Road, Chennai. Kamal Haasan switched on the camera and a song picturising Jai and Nayanthara was canned on the occasion. Arya was not present for the schedule as he was filming for Settai (2013) in Mumbai. Filming also took place in East Coast Road, in a Kerala-themed house. The scene depicting the marriage of Arya and Nayanthara's characters was shot at St Mary's Church in Pune. This was the only part shot outside Chennai. Filming wrapped in August 2013.

== Themes and influences ==
Critics have noted that the film draws similarities and inspirations from Tamil films like Nenjathai Killathe (1980), Mouna Ragam (1986) and the Kannada film Milana (2007).

== Soundtrack ==
The soundtrack album for Raja Rani was composed by G. V. Prakash Kumar. A single "Hey Baby" was released on 19 August 2013. The complete album was released on 23 August 2013 at Sathyam Cinemas, Chennai.

Track listing
No.	Title	Lyrics	Singer(s)	Length
1.	"Hey Baby"	Na. Muthukumar, Gana Bala	G. V. Prakash Kumar, Gana Bala, Aishwarya	05:06
2.	"Angnyaade"	Pa. Vijay	Shakthisree Gopalan	03:37
3.	"Chillena"	Na. Muthukumar	Clinton Cerejo, Alphons Joseph, Alka Ajith	05:12
4.	"Unnale"	Na. Muthukumar	Vandana Srinivasan	01:41
5.	"Oday Oday"	Pa. Vijay	Vijay Prakash, Shashaa Tirupati, Shalmali Kholgade	04:32
6.	"Imaye Imaye"	Pa. Vijay	G. V. Prakash Kumar, Shakthisree Gopalan	03:26
7.	"A Love For Life"	—	G. V. Prakash Kumar, Navin Iyer, Chennai Symphony	03:17
Total length:				26:50

== Marketing and release ==
An official teaser showing the lead pair quarrelling through their projections in a mirror, was released on 11 May 2013 by Fox Star Studios. The teaser went instantly viral garnering a large number of views. The official trailer was released along with the music album on 23 August 2013. The film was released on 27 September 2013. It was distributed by Fox Star Studios, the third of a three-film deal with Murugadoss.

== Reception ==
=== Critical response ===
S Saraswathi of Rediff.com rated the film 3/5 and stated, "Debutant director Atlee's Raja Rani is a simple refreshing tale about how to cope with life, when we lose someone we love. The film has a lot going for it and definitely succeeds in entertaining the audience." M Suganth from The Times of India gave 3 stars out of 5 and wrote "The film does leave you exhausted by the time it ends. Still, it remains always watchable, mainly because the director, like his mentor Shankar, embraces his old school storytelling methods with conviction". Sudhish Kamath of The Hindu cited "Atlee's promising debut Raja Rani merits a watch in spite of its fundamentally flawed structure".

In contrast, Gautaman Bhaskaran of Hindustan Times rated it 2 stars and said, "At a little over 150 minutes, Raja Rani is a bumpy ride with potholes of songs, with characters who are nothing better than caricatures and with a romance that hardly engages". Sify too gave an unfavourable review stating, "Debutant director Atlee's highly hyped Raja Rani starts off promisingly and keeps us engaged in the first half. But post-interval it loses steam, and turns out to be a cheesy, emotionally manipulative drama with a predictable long drawn out climax that goes on and on for 35 minutes".

=== Box office ===
Raja Rani earned approximately ₹4 crore (equivalent to ₹7.4 crore or US$770,000 in 2026) worldwide on its first day, with ₹3.50 crore (equivalent to ₹6.5 crore or US$670,000 in 2026) from Tamil Nadu alone. It was number one at the Chennai box office during its opening weekend. The film eventually emerged a huge success after earning over ₹50 crore (equivalent to ₹93 crore or US$9.6 million in 2026) worldwide as of mid-November.

== Accolades ==
Ceremony	Category	Nominee	Result	Ref.
Tamil Nadu State Film Awards	Best Actor	Arya	Won	
Tamil Nadu State Film Awards	Best Actress	Nayanthara	Won	
Tamil Nadu State Film Awards	Best Dialogue Writer	Atlee	Won	
Tamil Nadu State Film Awards	Best Comedian	Sathyan	Won	
Edison Awards	Best Actress	Nayanthara	Won	
Edison Awards	Best Debut Director	Atlee	Won	
Edison Awards	Best Background Score	G. V. Prakash Kumar	Won	
8th Vijay Awards	Favourite Heroine	Nayanthara	Won	
8th Vijay Awards	Best Actress	Nayanthara	Won	
8th Vijay Awards	Best Debut Director	Atlee	Won	
8th Vijay Awards	Best Story, Screenplay Writer	Atlee	Nominated	
8th Vijay Awards	Best Dialogue	Atlee	Nominated	
8th Vijay Awards	Favourite Song	"Hey Baby"; G. V. Prakash Kumar	Nominated	
8th Vijay Awards	Best Music Director	"Hey Baby"; G. V. Prakash Kumar	Nominated	
8th Vijay Awards	Best Background Score	"Hey Baby"; G. V. Prakash Kumar	Nominated	
8th Vijay Awards	Best Best Supporting Actor	Sathyaraj	Nominated	
8th Vijay Awards	Favourite Film	Fox Star Studios; AR Murugadoss Productions	Nominated	
8th Vijay Awards	Best Cinematographer	George C. Williams	Nominated	
8th Vijay Awards	Best Editor	Anthony L. Ruben	Nominated	
8th Vijay Awards	Best Art Director	T. Muthuraj	Nominated	
8th Vijay Awards	Best Make Up	Albert Chettiyar; Avinash; Bujji Babu; Ramachandran; Ramu; Shanmugam	Nominated	
8th Vijay Awards	Best Costume Designer	Chaitanya Rao; Deepali Noor; Kaviza Raebhela; Sathya	Nominated	
61st Filmfare Awards South	Best Actress	Nayanthara	Won	
61st Filmfare Awards South	Best Supporting Actor	Jai	Nominated	
61st Filmfare Awards South	Best Supporting Actor	Sathyaraj	Won	
61st Filmfare Awards South	Best Supporting Actress	Nazriya Nazim	Nominated	
3rd South Indian International Movie Awards	SIIMA Awards for Best Tamil Actress	Nayanthara	Nominated	
3rd South Indian International Movie Awards	Best Actor Supporting Role Male	Jai	Nominated	
3rd South Indian International Movie Awards	Best Music Director	G. V. Prakash Kumar	Nominated	
3rd South Indian International Movie Awards	Best Debut Director	Atlee	Nominated	
3rd South Indian International Movie Awards	Best Film	Fox Star Studios; AR Murugadoss Productions	Nominated	

== Remakes ==
Raja Rani was remade in Bengali as Shudhu Tomari Jonyo (2015), and in Sinhala as Sihinayaki Adare (2024).

== In other media ==
The scene where John (Arya) marries Regina (Nayanthara) was spoofed in the director's own Bigil (2019). In that film, Angel (Nayanthara) refuses to marry John (Abi Saravanan) and instead falls for Michael (Vijay).
