= Velaikkaran (2017 film) =

Indian drama film by Mohan Raja

- Theatrical release poster
- Directed by: Mohan Raja
- Screenplay by: Mohan Raja; N. Baskaran; D. Suresh; A.N. Balakrishnan
- Story by: Mohan Raja; Venkatesh Babu Krishnasamy
- Dialogues by: Mohan Raja N. Baskaran
- Produced by: R. D. Raja; N. Ramasamy; Hema Rukmani; N. Murali
- Starring: Sivakarthikeyan; Fahadh Faasil; Nayanthara; Sneha; Prakash Raj
- Cinematography: Ramji
- Edited by: Ruben; Vivek Harshan; Gowtham G.A. Vetre Krishnan
- Music by: Anirudh Ravichander
- Production company: 24AM Studios
- Distributed by: Fox Star Studios; Sri Thenandal Films
- Release date: 22 December 2017 (India)
- Running time: 160 minutes
- Country: India
- Language: Tamil
- Budget: ₹35 crore
- Box office: ₹86 crore

Velaikkaran (transl. Worker) is a 2017 Indian Tamil-language action film written and directed by Mohan Raja. Produced by R. D. Raja under his banner 24AM Studios. The film stars Sivakarthikeyan, Fahadh Faasil, Nayanthara, Sneha and Prakash Raj in lead roles. Mahesh Manjrekar, Sathish, Thambi Ramaiah, RJ Balaji, Vijay Vasanth, Robo Shankar and Rohini play supporting roles. The film's music is composed by Anirudh Ravichander, with cinematography by Ramji. The film is based on a sales executive named Arivazhagan (Sivakarthikeyan) who fights against food adulteration committed by high-class companies.

The film was released on 22 December 2017 to positive reviews with praise for Sivakarthikeyan and Fahadh Fassil's performance, story, social message, screenplay, cinematography, Anirudh's soundtrack and background score.

== Plot ==
Arivazhagan, also known as Arivu, is a socially conscious and determined young man from Kolaikkara Kuppam, a slum in Chennai. Wanting to uplift his community, he starts a local radio station, Kuppam FM 90.8, with help from the area gangster Kasi. However, Arivu’s true goal is to free his people from Kasi’s control, as Kasi keeps them dependent to maintain his power. Arivu succeeds in turning the people against Kasi, breaking his influence over the area.

Following this, Arivu joins a major FMCG company called Saffron, working under Stella Bruce in the sales department. He also helps his childhood friend Bhagya leave Kasi’s gang and get a job in Saffron. There, he meets brand manager Aadhi, who becomes a mentor figure and teaches him how to grow through smart work. But tragedy strikes when Bhagya is murdered by Kasi in Saffron’s warehouse. Kasi later reveals that he acted on the orders of Saffron’s president, Jayaram, because Bhagya was helping a woman named Kasthuri, who had filed a case against the company for selling adulterated products that led to her son’s death.

Shocked by the truth, Arivu vows to fight against food adulteration across not just Saffron, but all major food companies, including one owned by powerful businessman Madhav Kurup. Arivu shares his mission with Aadhi, unaware that Aadhi is actually Adhiban Madhav, the son of Madhav Kurup, who has joined Saffron to learn its secrets and merge it with his father’s empire.

Arivu manages to inspire workers across companies to manufacture only quality products and shows symbolic unity by making them wear kerchiefs. But Aadhi manipulates events, takes control of the companies, and turns the employees against Arivu by framing him as a traitor. He also burns down a stock of pure products and reveals his true identity, declaring himself the next CEO and vowing to resume adulteration without the workers’ knowledge.

On the night before May 1st, Arivu goes live on Radio Mirchi and reveals that despite the sabotage, many Saffron employees, inspired by department head Karpaga Vinayagam, continued to produce only unadulterated products. Workers like Kennedy, Vinoth, Ansari, and Sivaranjani confirm their commitment to ethical manufacturing.

Arivu ends his speech by urging workers everywhere not to waste their loyalty on corrupt employers, but to stand up for honesty and public welfare. His message resonates across the city. The employees threaten to rebel against Aadhi if he brings back adulteration, and Arivu’s efforts are finally recognized. The film concludes with Arivu celebrating his victory with Mrinalini, his friends, his slum, and the people of Chennai, showing that truth, unity, and courage can bring real change.

== Cast ==
- Sivakarthikeyan as Arivarasan (Arivu)
- Fahadh Faasil as Adhiban Madhav (Aadhi)
- Nayanthara as Mirnalini "Miru", Arivu's love interest
- Sneha as Kasthuri
- Prakash Raj as Kasi
- Thambi Ramaiah as Stella Bruce
- RJ Balaji as Sriram
- Sathish as Hari
- Vijay Vasanth as Bhagya
- Robo Shankar as Chinna Thambi
- Rohini as Ponni - Arivu's mother
- Charle as Murugesan- Arivu's father
- Ramdoss as Karpaga Vinayagam
- Aruldoss as Ansari
- Kaali Venkat as Vinoth
- Mansoor Ali Khan as Kennedy
- Vinodhini Vaidyanathan as Sivaranjani
- Mime Gopi as Kishta
- Syed as Syed
- Y. G. Mahendra as Narayanan
- Madhusudhan Rao as Madhusudhan
- Mahesh Manjrekar as Madhav Kurup
- Sharath Lohitashwa as Doss
- Anish Kuruvilla as Jayaram (voice over by Amit Bhargav)
- Nagineedu as Loknath
- Vivek Prasanna as Babu
- Uday Mahesh as Naga Sudarshan
- Balaji Venugopal as Saffron Assistant Senior Manager
- Saravana Subbiah as TV Host
- Maya S. Krishnan as Actress
- Vazhakku Enn Muthuraman as Food Inspector
- Shyam Prasad as one of the Board of Directors of Saffron Company
- Vijayraj as Saffron Staff
- Mithun Raj as Saffron Interview Candidate
- Rajie Vijay Sarathy as Sriram's mother
- Abdool as TV Stabilizer Salesman
- Yuva Lakshmi as Vani
- RJ Sha as himself (cameo appearance)

== Production ==
=== Development ===
In December 2015, an official press announcement from producer R. D. Raja revealed that director Mohan Raja and Sivakarthikeyan would collaborate for his second production venture. A launch event for the film was held on 11 March 2016, with the team announcing their intentions of starting the shoot in late 2016.

=== Cast and crew ===
Nayanthara signed the film in April 2016, in collaboration with Sivakarthikeyan, while Malayalam actor Fahadh Faasil was also brought in to appear in a antagonist in the film, marking his debut in Tamil cinema. Prior to the start of shoot, several actors were finalised for supporting roles including Sneha, Prakash Raj, Rohini and Thambi Ramaiah. RJ Balaji and Sathish also joined the cast. Anirudh Ravichander, Vivek Harshan and T. Muthuraj joined the team as the music composer, editor and art director respectively. Likewise Anal Arasu was selected as the stunt choreographer, while Vishnu Govind and Sree Sankar were put in charge of sound editing and mixing. In a turn of events, editor Ruben replaces Vivek Harshan, which is evident on the latest film poster released for Deepavali season.

=== Filming and post-production ===
Production started with the film as yet untitled in November 2016, in T Nagar, Chennai. The shoot continued throughout January at Prasad Studios in Chennai where art director Muthuraj had erected a large set resembling Chennai's slums. In February 2017, Behindwoods reported that the film tentatively being given the title of Velaikkaran. This was after the team bought the title rights from Vijay Vasanth who had registered it for a future film. Behindwoods also reported that Fahadh Faasil would dub himself in Tamil in this movie, a first for him.

== Music ==
Velaikkaran

Soundtrack album by Anirudh Ravichander
- Released: 3 December 2017
- Recorded: 2017
- Studios: Albuquerque Records, Chennai
- Genre: Feature film soundtrack
- Length: 19:06
- Language: Tamil
- Label: Sony Music
- Producer: Anirudh Ravichander

Anirudh Ravichander chronology
Vivegam (2017)	Velaikkaran (2017)	Agnyaathavaasi (2018)

Singles from Velaikkaran
- 1. "Karuthavanlaam Galeejaam" Released: 29 August 2017; 2. "Iraiva + Uyire" Released: 2 November 2017

The soundtrack album and background score of this film were composed by Anirudh Ravichander. The album consists of five songs with Madhan Karky and Vivek penning one song, and the rest of the songs were penned by Viveka.

The album was released by Sony Music India. The first single track "Karuthavanlaam Galeejaam" sung by Anirudh and written by Viveka was released on 28 August 2017, which picturises the life of the slum people, and also notes, that the lyrics intent to celebrate the working class and their contribution towards the development of the city. The song is filmed, in a huge set erected at Prasad Labs, Chennai for a slum like concept. The second single was released on 2 November 2017. The combined single track "Iraiva + Uyire" sung by Anirudh and Jonita Gandhi consists of two songs "Iraiva" and "Uyire" which deals about love and life respectively. The song genres in these two of these, were alternatively different. While "Iraiva" is a solo number which consists of a slow melody with rock beats in between, "Uyire" is a slow enhancing duet, with beats involved in it. Sivakarthikeyan and Nayanthara went to Georgia in September 2016, to shoot this duet in the picturesque locations of the country.

The tracklist was released on 2 December 2017, through the official Twitter account of the production house. The audio launch event for the film was held on 3 December 2017 at ITC Grand Chola Hotel in Chennai where Sivakarthikeyan, Mohan Raja and Anirudh Ravichander along with other cast and crew, were present at the venue, while Nayanthara and Fahadh Faasil did not attend the audio launch. The event was streamed live on Facebook, YouTube and Twitter. The songs were released simultaneously in other digital streaming platforms. Later, the audio launch was telecasted on Star Vijay on 10 December 2017.

No.	Title	Lyrics	Singers	Length
1.	"Karuthavanlaam Galeejam"	Viveka	Anirudh Ravichander	3:28
2.	"Iraiva"	Viveka	Anirudh Ravichander, Jonita Gandhi	4:57
3.	"Vaa Velaikkara"	Vivek	Shakthisree Gopalan, Bjorn Surrao	2:35
4.	"Idhayane"	Madhan Karky	Anirudh Ravichander, Neeti Mohan	3:41
5.	"Ezhu Velaikkara"	Viveka	Siddharth Mahadevan	5:05
Total length:				19:06

The album received positive reviews from critics. Behindwoods rated the album 3 out of 5 stars, with a quote "Variety is the name of the game, and Anirudh is one of its best players!" Hindustan Times gave positive reviews stating "Anirudh Ravichander delivers a box full of surprises". Studioflicks rated 3.5 out of 5 and gave a verdict "Sivakarthikeyan-Anirudh duo strikes gold again" stating that "Velaikkaran strikes spectacularly with three instant hits that includes Idhayane, Karuthavanlaam Galeejaam, and Iraiva. The other tracks sounding like signature songs will definitely gain its impact with the visuals."

== Release ==
=== Theatrical ===
On the first day of the film's shoot, the producer R. D. Raja revealed that the film would have a theatrical release on 25 August 2017. In April 2017, the production house has announced that the release date is postponed to 29 September 2017. Due to delays in post production, the film's release date was shifted to the Christmas season, 22 December 2017.

=== Marketing ===
The first look poster was initially slated to release on 1 May 2017, coinciding with the Labour Day. But it was released on 5 June 2017, which features Sivakarthikeyan as a marketing executive, with a bag in one hand and a knife in another hand. The second look poster of the film was released on 8 August 2017, on actor Fahadh Faasil's birthday, which features Sivakarthikeyan and Fahadh Faasil. Following this, the teaser of the film was released on 14 August 2017. A motion poster, describing the film's cast was released on 6 December 2017.

=== Home media ===
The film is dubbed in Hindi as Ghayal Khiladi and released on YouTube on 6 January 2019 by Goldmines Telefilms.

== Reception ==
=== Box office ===
The film collected ₹50 crore (US$5.2 million) in Tamil Nadu and close to ₹18 crore (US$1.9 million) in overseas. The film collected over ₹86 crore (US$8.9 million) at the worldwide box office and was declared a box office success.

=== Critical response ===
Baradwaj Rangan wrote for Film Companion, "The addressing of class in Tamil films is nothing new – and we know slum-resident Arivu (Sivakarthikeyan) is going to run a scratch across these rich men’s lives – but the dignity in this film is. It wants to be a crowd-pleaser, but with class."
