= Techofes =

Annual intercollegiate culture festival

- Genre: intercollegiate culture festival
- Locations: Chennai, India
- Founded: 1948
- Major events: Techofes Awards, Pro-shows, Choreo-Nite, Live-in Concert, Mr & Ms Techofes
- Filing status: Student Run, Non Profit Organization
- Sponsor: College of Engineering, Guindy
- Website: Techofes

Techofes is an annual intercollegiate culture festival at the College of Engineering, Guindy in Chennai, India. The tradition began in 1948. It is a three-day event usually held in mid-February.

== Past editions ==
- Techofes '06 took place starting 10 February 2006.
- Techofes '07 took place starting 14 February 2007. The special visitor was actor Vikram and the showpiece event was a concert by Vasundra Das.
- Techofes '10 took place starting 14 February 2010. It included a special screening of Aayirathil Oruvan at the presence of its director Selvaraghavan. Pro-nite saw a performance by Karthik.
- Techofes '11 took place starting 16 February 2011. It saw film making workshops with Gautham Vasudev Menon and Sameera Reddy.
- Techofes '12 took place starting 15 February 2012. It included performances of Dhanush, Anirudh and Ajeesh of the then upcoming movie 3 on opening night, a sumo wrestling performance and a live-in concert for composer Yuvan Shankar Raja.
- Techofes '19 took place starting from 27 February and ending at 2 March.

== See also ==
- Kurukshetra (college festival)
