= Sardar (2022 film) =

2022 film by P. S. Mithran

- Theatrical release poster
- Directed by: P. S. Mithran
- Written by: P. S. Mithran; M. R. Pon Parthiban; Roju; Bipin Ragu; Geevee
- Produced by: S. Lakshman Kumar
- Starring: Karthi; Raashii Khanna; Rajisha Vijayan; Chunky Pandey; Laila
- Narrated by: P. S. Mithran
- Cinematography: George C. Williams
- Edited by: Ruben
- Music by: G. V. Prakash Kumar
- Production company: Prince Pictures
- Distributed by: Red Giant Movies
- Release date: 21 October 2022 (India)
- Running time: 165 minutes
- Country: India
- Language: Tamil
- Box office: ₹100 crore

Sardar (transl. Chief) is a 2022 Indian Tamil-language spy action thriller film directed by P. S. Mithran based on a script he co-wrote with M. R. Pon Parthiban, Roju, Bipin Ragu and Geevee and produced by S. Lakshman Kumar under Prince Pictures. The film stars Karthi in a dual role alongside Raashii Khanna, Rajisha Vijayan, Chunky Pandey, Laila, Rithvik, Munishkanth, Avinash, Yugi Sethu and Balaji Sakthivel in pivotal roles. In the film, a disgraced spy returns from a long exile to stop the launch of a suspicious water company which plans to spread toxic water across the country. The film marks Panday's debut and Laila's comeback to Tamil cinema, as well as films in general, after 16 years.

The film was launched on November 2020 without a title and the official title announced in April 2021. Principal photography commenced the same month and continued till July 2022, despite being halted twice due to the COVID-19 pandemic and Karthi's commitments to other films. Filming locations included Chennai, Kodaikanal, Pondicherry, Mumbai, Mysore, Azerbaijan and Georgia. The music was composed by G. V. Prakash Kumar, with cinematography handled by George C. Williams and editing done by Ruben.

Sardar was theatrically released on 21 October 2022, prior to the Diwali week and received highly positive reviews from critics. The film was a commercial success, grossing ₹100 crore (US$10 million) and became one of the highest grossing Tamil films of 2022. A circumquel titled Sardar 2, was released in 2026.

== Plot ==
Tamil Nadu Police Inspector Vijay Prakash is obsessed with reviving his reputation, which was tarnished 32 years earlier when his father, former RAW agent Chandra Bose, was branded a national traitor. The social disgrace led Vijay's entire extended family to commit suicide, leaving Vijay to be raised by a sympathetic police officer, Paavadaisaami. Vijay woos his childhood friend, Advocate Shalini, who represents social activist Sameera Thomas in court. Sameera is petitioning against "One India One Pipeline", a project spearheaded by former National Security Advisor Maharaj Rathore's private water company to control India's potable water supply.

After the court rejects the petition, a classified file containing details of 1980s RAW agents is stolen from a secret vault in Rajaji Bhavan. Deducing Sameera took the file, Vijay tracks her down with the help of her son, Timmy, but later finds her murdered; her death is staged as a suicide, and she is framed as a traitor who stole and sold state secrets. Refusing to accept this, Vijay discovers that Timmy suffers from sarcoidosis due to BPA in packaged water, causing her to campaign against corporations that violate safety regulations. He further learns that Sameera was murdered for refusing to disclose the location of a secret operative known as "Sardar". He accesses her laptop, uncovering her research that the "One India One Pipeline" project aims to monopolise the nation's water supply.

Vijay and Shalini learn Sameera was scheduled to meet Agent Karapanpoochi, who provided her with the key to the classified file. They locate Karapanpoochi at a railway station, but an unknown assailant kills him during a chase. Inspecting his belongings, Vijay finds the address of a prison in Chittagong, Bangladesh, to which Timmy previously sent a red letter. The letter contains a covert "Code Red", alerting RAW Chief Chandra Mohan that an unidentified and exceptionally dangerous inmate held in Bangladesh for 32 years is actually Sardar. Rathore learns of this and instructs the NIA to have the inmate killed, but a sympathetic guard alerts Sardar, enabling his escape. Vijay retrieves the stolen file from a hidden bunker, defeating an assassin sent to intercept it. Through the documents, Vijay and Shalini learn his father's history.

Past: In 1985, Chandra Bose operates as a RAW agent codenamed "Sardar" while maintaining a cover as a stage actor. He marries his cross cousin, Indhrani, who secretly knows of his intelligence work. Following a border water-poisoning incident, Sardar's trainer Rathore and Agent Victor deploy him to infiltrate a Pakistani army camp. Sardar retrieves a Chinese document revealing that China conspires to force India into adopting the pipeline project by poisoning local water sources, aided by an Indian mole codenamed "Laughing Buddha". Sardar identifies Advisor P. K. Abraham as the mole. Rathore instructs Sardar to assassinate Abraham, proposing to brand him a traitor temporarily until they prove Abraham's treason. However, consumed by greed, Rathore frames Sardar permanently and joins the Chinese syndicate as the new "Laughing Buddha". Oblivious to Rathore's intentions, Sardar surrenders to the Bangladesh Coast Guard to hide, while Rathore resigns, leaving Sardar's family to face disgrace.

In the present, learning of Rathore's betrayal and his family's fate, an enraged Sardar tracks Victor. Paavadaisaami is forced to help RAW detain Vijay to lure Sardar, while Shalini visits Victor, who has been sheltering Timmy. Sardar infiltrates RAW headquarters disguised as Victor, using Chandra Mohan's biometrics to access the central vault. Trapping him in the vault, Rathore reveals to Sardar that he personally murdered his family, staging it as a mass suicide after Indhrani overheard his plot, to ensure Sardar remained framed as a traitor. A detained Vijay overhears the conversation and gets upset.

Outraged, Sardar drives a truck loaded with reactive Sodium into Rathore's central water plant, asking Timmy to remain outside. While Vijay assists by subduing Rathore's mercenaries, Sardar drives the truck into the water tanks, causing a massive explosion that destroys the infrastructure and kills Rathore. Following the incident, Sardar reunites with Vijay and dissuades him from clearing his name publicly, arguing that exposing Rathore's state corruption would undermine public trust in the government.

The government clears Sameera's name and cancels the pipeline project. Vijay is suspended from the police force for failing to capture Sardar; however, Chandra Mohan, who has discerned the truth about Rathore, reveals he orchestrated the suspension to covertly recruit Vijay into RAW for an overseas assignment in Cambodia.

== Cast ==
- Karthi in a dual role as
  - Chandra Bose "Agent Sardar"
  - Inspector Vijay Prakash
- Raashii Khanna as Shalini, a Lawyer, Vijay’s love interest (Voice dubbed by Ashmini Balakrishnan)
- Rajisha Vijayan as Indhrani, Bose’s wife, Vijay’s mother
- Chunky Panday as Maharaj Rathore
- Laila as Sameera Thomas, a social activist (Voice dubbed by Savitha Reddy)
- Rithvik as Timothy alias Timmy, Sameera’s son
- Munishkanth as Paavadaisami, Vijay’s adopted father
- Sengottuvel as Kathiresan
- Ashwin Kkumar as Rathore's hitman
- Yugi Sethu as Agent Karapanpoochi
- Avinash as Agent Chetta (Victor)
- Yog Japee as Chandra Mohan, RAW Chief
- Mohammad Ali Baig as P. K. Abraham, NSA Chief
- Balaji Sakthivel as Chidambaram, Bose’s father
- Dinesh Prabhakar as Chittagong Prison guard
- Aadhira Pandilakshmi as Muthulakshmi, Bose’s mother
- Sal Yusuf as General Yusuf (Pakistan Army)
- Ilavarasu as Politician
- Rajeev Anand as RAW officer
- Gunavanthan as RAW officer
- Sahana Vasudevan as RAW officer
- Syed as RAW officer
- Shyam Krishnan as Rathore's assistant
- Swaminathan as Reporter
- D. R. K. Kiran as Logu, Water supply agent
- Sharath Ravi as Goon
- Jagan Krishnan as Media Analyst
- K. S. Krishnan as Dr. Kuppusami, Sameera’s family doctor (Voice dubbed by Subbu Panchu)
- Vijay Varadaraj as Philips
- Abdool Lee as Abdul
- Myna Nandhini as a theatre actor portraying Valli
- TSR Srinivasan
- Geevee Vignesh as the thief (special appearance in the song "Inky Pinky Ponky")
- Ram Rajendran as prisoner

== Production ==
=== Development ===
In late-December 2019, it was reported that Karthi, who was filming for Ponniyin Selvan: I and II at that time had signed a new project with P. S. Mithran and the production would commence only after his commitments for the two-part series. However, production of the two-parter was halted due to the COVID-19 pandemic lockdown in India which led to Karthi prioritizing on other projects. On 14 November 2020, coinciding with Diwali, the production company Prince Pictures officially confirmed the project.

A puja ceremony was held at the office of Prince Pictures with the actor and director being present. Mithran renewed his norm technicians—cinematographer George C. Williams, editor Ruben and stunt choreographer Dhilip Subbarayan—while G. V. Prakash Kumar was assigned as the music composer and K. Kadhir served as the art director. The film's title Sardar was officially announced on 25 April 2021.

=== Pre-production ===
Mithran wrote the initial script during the COVID-19 lockdown period, with fellow co-writers M. R. Pon Parthiban, Roju, Bipin Ragu and Geevee providing additional inputs. In an interaaction with Srivatsan S of The Hindu, Mithran admitted that he wanted to make a "suave" spy film like the James Bond and Mission: Impossible films, but the principal characters in the films—Bond and Ethan Hunt—did not have a family and are emotionally detached, which led to the question "Why are spies in movies that cold? Should they be cold? This film is such an exploration. I’ve balanced out my ambitions with the palatability factor." Pre-production for the film commenced in late-November 2020 and continued through early April 2021, with reports suggesting that filming would commence after the release of Karthi's Sulthan (2021).

=== Casting ===
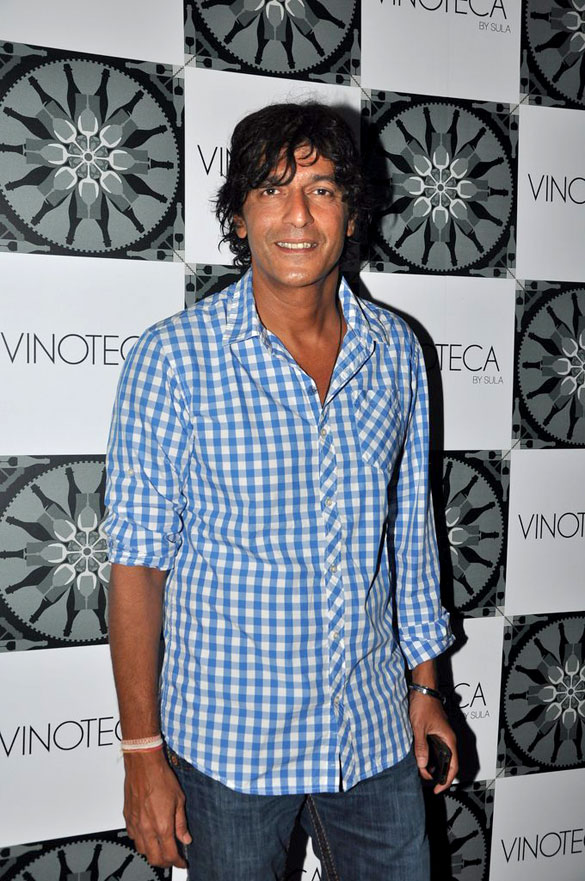
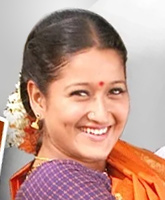
Sardar marked the debut of Chunky Panday (left) in Tamil cinema as well as Laila's (right) return to films after a 16-year hiatus.

Karthi was reported to play dual roles in the film: one being the police officer and the other being the agent. It was the second time the actor played dual roles after Siruthai (2011). For the titular character as the agent, Karthi was seen sporting around 15 different makeovers; Mithran clarified that "every single makeover has a purpose. The film is about a theatre actor who can play several characters in a single play. I wrote Karthi’s character with this description: someone from the audience goes and tells Karthi’s character that they really enjoyed the play and thought he did a terrific job in five disguises. Then the Karthi character would say: 'No, I actually had 11 disguises in the play.'"

In April 2021, Raashii Khanna and Rajisha Vijayan was announced as the female leads; the latter, in her third Tamil film after Karnan and Jai Bhim (both 2021). Simran was further signed to play an important role, and Chunky Panday was cast as the main antagonist, marking his Tamil cinema debut. In March 2022, Simran opted out of the project due to scheduling conflicts and Laila signed the project the same month, returning to films after a 16-year hiatus. Balaji Sakthivel, Rithvik, Munishkanth, Yugi Sethu, Avinash Yelandur, Yog Japee, Mohammad Ali Baig amongst others were cast in supporting roles.

=== Filming ===
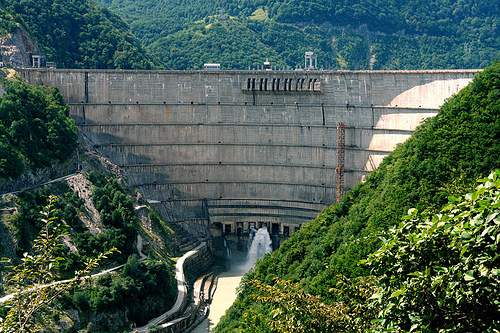
Major portions of Sardar were shot at the Baku Convention Center and the Government House in Azerbaijan, and at the Enguri Dam in Tsalenjikha, Georgia for ten days.

Principal photography commenced on 26 April 2021 at Chennai. Due to the second wave of the COVID-19 pandemic in India, filming halted after two days of shoot. The makers constructed a jail set at Gokulam Studios in Chennai, which cost them ₹2 crore (US$210,000), and intended to shoot those portions there after pandemic restrictions were lifted. In June, it was reported that filming would resume during the first week of July after government allowed resumption of film shoots with 100 crew members within Chennai, Chengalpattu and Kanchipuram. However, filming resumed on 16 July at the specially erected set in Gokulam Studios, with a stunt sequence choreographed by Dhilip Subbarayan being canned first.

The film's first schedule was completed by early August 2021. Following that, shooting was reportedly put on hold as Karthi prioritized on M. Muthaiya's directorial Viruman (2022). After the production of Viruman was completed, shooting for Sardar resumed on 6 January 2022. Raashii Khanna joined the film's shoot in Chennai on 5 February. The team canned an action sequence at the forest areas of Kodaikanal during that month. In early March, the team went to Mysore for filming another action sequence, specifically set in forest areas. Khanna resumed filming in mid-March, with her portions being filmed for 12 days in Chennai, Mumbai and Mysore.

In May 2022, the team left to Azerbaijan for filming Panday's sequences. The team shot his portions at the Baku Convention Center and the Government House, Baku, and at the Enguri Dam in Tsalenjikha, Georgia for 10 days. As each day of shoot in these countries, accounted to around ₹24 lakh (US$25,000), the team had nearly spent ₹4 crore (US$420,000) for the particular schedule. The team initially planned to shoot combination sequences between Karthi and Panday, but as Karthi was on a vacation during that time, Panday's portions were shot first. By June 2022, the team returned to Pondicherry for filming the climax portions. Principal photography wrapped by July 2022.

=== Post-production ===
Post-production works commenced during May 2022. Karthi began dubbing for his portions in July 2022, soon after the completion of filming. In September 2022, George C. Williams through his X (formerly Twitter) had stated that the digital intermediate and color grading works were undergoing at the post-production company Knack Studios, under the supervision of Prasath Somasekar. Lorven Studios handled the principal visual effects under the supervision of Hariharasudhan. The film was sent to the Central Board of Film Certification during mid-October 2022 where the film received a U/A certificate with a runtime of 166 minutes (2 hours and 46 minutes) being finalized.

== Music ==
G. V. Prakash Kumar composed the film score and four-song soundtrack to Sardar, in his first collaboration with Mithran and fourth with Karthi after Aayirathil Oruvan (2010), Saguni (2012) and Komban (2015). The lyrics for the songs were written by Yugabharathi, GKB, Arivu, Ekadesi and Rokesh. Karthi recorded vocals for the song "Yaerumayileri" which was released as a single on 10 October 2022. The soundtrack was released under the Sony Music India label on 19 October 2022, two days prior to the film's release. The chorus phrase of the song "Rasasayya" sung by Bhadra Rajin for The Storyteller Band has been used in the song "Soraka Poove".

Track listing
No.	Title	Lyrics	Singer(s)	Length
1.	"Yaerumayileri"	Yugabharathi	Karthi	4:12
2.	"Mere Jaan"	GKB	Nakash Aziz	4:20
3.	"Soraka Poove"	Ekadesi	Aditya RK, Bhadra Rajin	3:52
4.	"Inky Pinky Ponky"	Arivu, Rokesh	Arivu, Santhosh Hariharan	3:26
Total length:				15:51

== Marketing ==
The film's teaser trailer was released on 30 September 2022, launched by Karthi's brother, actor Suriya. The full-length trailer was launched at an event held in Nexus Vijaya Mall on 14 October 2022. At the event, the team distributed glass containers branded with the film's posters and logo instead of plastic bottles, for the film's cast and crew and other media personalities. The pre-release event was held at Daspalla Convention Center in Hyderabad, with Nagarjuna as the chief guest.

== Release ==
=== Theatrical ===
Sardar was released on 21 October 2022 on the eve of Diwali along with Sivakarthikeyan's Prince. The film was further released in Telugu under the same title.

=== Distribution ===
Red Giant Movies acquired the theatrical distribution rights in Tamil Nadu. The theatrical distribution rights for the Telugu states were acquired by Annapurna Studios. The Karnataka distribution rights were acquired by AV Media Consultancy, while Fortune Cinemas acquired the theatrical rights in Kerala.

=== Home media ===
The post-theatrical streaming rights of the film were bought by Aha. The satellite rights of the film were sold to Kalaignar TV, even before filming was completed. The film began streaming on Aha from 18 November 2022.

== Reception ==
=== Critical reception ===
Sardar received positive reviews from critics. Kirubhakar Purushothaman of The Indian Express gave three-and-a-half out of five stars and wrote "One of the significant differences between PS Mithran’s film and the generic affairs is that the director treats the genre and the audience with respect." Avinash Ramachandran of Cinema Express rated three-and-a-half out of five and wrote that "Sardar is a true blue action thriller with the spy angle amply explored [...] With both Irumbuthirai and Hero having open endings, Mithran's propensity for promising us a franchise of sorts is known, and with Sardar, he has definitely delivered a film with the potential to finally fulfill that promise". M. Suganth of The Times of India rated three out of five and called it "a solid spy movie, nothing more nothing less". Krishna Selvaseelan of Tamil Guardian gave the film three out of five stars, writing, "The film emotionally connects through well done parallels in the story and properly realised characters and their respective arcs."

Priyanka Sundar of Firstpost rated the film three out of five stars and wrote "Overall, the film comes together after its initial hiccup, and it forms a cohesive and effective narrative". Prathyush Parasuraman of Film Companion complimented the staging, summarized that: "the world of Sardar is established with style, dramatic intensity, and when needed, that silly comedic charm. The imagination of its maker — PS Mithran — bends just as easily towards silliness as it does towards style, such are the gruelling demands from a mass film director." However, he was critical of the "designer-dusty sepia grime" toned color grading being prominent throughout the film, making it "looks dull, and the world lethargic". Srivatsan S of The Hindu wrote that "The light of Vikram does shine brightly on Sardar but isn’t eclipsed by it, letting the PS Mithran film breathe and have its own share of enjoyable portions.

Haricharan Pudipeddi of Hindustan Times wrote "Sardar is still a watchable spy thriller that’s powered by some great action set pieces." Janani K of India Today rated two-and-a-half out of five stars and called it "a solid film with a strong core idea. With a few misses here and there, the film makes for a compelling watch." In a negative review, Sowmya Rajendran of The News Minute rated one-and-a-half out of five stars and wrote that "The film moves across time periods, shifts from one country to another, and never tires of its ambition to drill information into our brains".

=== Box office ===
Sardar opened to 380 screens in Tamil Nadu on the first day and grossed ₹3.7 crore (US$380,000) in the state, and ₹5.75–6 crore (US$660,000–690,000) worldwide, according to trade analyst Ramesh Bala. The Times of India, however, reported that the film ₹8 crore (US$830,000) worldwide. While Bala initiated that the film had a dull opening due to the competition between Sivakarthikeyan's Prince and the holdover Ponniyin Selvan: I, also starring Karthi, it saw growth on its evening and night shows, owing to positive word of mouth. The film grossed around ₹10 crore (US$1.0 million) on its second day, with the two-day collections being reported ₹18 crore (US$1.9 million). On its third day, the film grossed ₹7 crore (US$730,000), becoming the highest grossing film in that weekend.

The film further saw growth on its fourth day (24 October), coinciding Diwali, performing well ahead of Sivakarthikeyan's Prince. Besides its performance in Tamil Nadu, the film collected ₹7 crore (US$730,000) from the Telugu states and ₹7 crore (US$730,000) in Kerala during the first four days of its release. By the end of its fifth day, the film earned ₹10 crore (US$1.0 million) resulted in its five-day gross accounting to ₹50 crore (US$5.2 million). The collections in Tamil Nadu during the extended opening weekend (21–25 October) were around ₹50 crore (US$5.2 million). Owing to the commercial performance, screenings of the film increased from 380 to 500 in its second weekend with the film being moved to main screens across multiplexes.

By the end of its tenth day, the film grossed ₹85 crore (US$8.8 million). As of 7 November 2022, the film's worldwide earnings were accounted to be ₹103.50 crore (US$11 million), becoming Karthi's third film to cross ₹100 crore at the box office, after Kaithi (2019) and Ponniyin Selvan: I.

== Circumquel ==
At the film's success meet, Karthi and Mithran announced the circumquel for the film being titled Sardar 2. An announcement teaser for the same was screened during the event and officially released online. The film began production on 12 July 2024 and completed by March 2025, with filming taking place in Chennai, Hyderabad, Bangkok, Luton, Madurai and Kochi. S. J. Suryah was cast as the main antagonist, while Malavika Mohanan, Ashika Ranganath and Rajisha Vijayan as the female leads, the latter of whom reprises her role from the predecessor. The film was released on 10 September 2026.
