= P. S. Mithran =

Indian film director and screenwriter

- Born: Mannargudi, Tamil Nadu, India
- Education: College of Engineering, Guindy, Chennai, Tamil nadu, India
- Occupation: Film director Screenwriter
- Years active: 2018–present
- Spouse: Ashameera Aiyappan

P. S. Mithran is an Indian film director and screenwriter who is currently working in the Tamil film industry. He made his directorial debut through Irumbu Thirai (2018). He followed it up with the superhero film, Hero (2019), and spy thriller, Sardar (2022).

== Personal life ==
P. S. Mithran married film journalist Ashameera Aiyappan in 2022.

== Career ==
In August 2016, Vishal decided to fund and act in a venture directed by Mithran and subsequently signed on actress Samantha to play the leading female role in the film. The team signed Arjun to play the antagonist in January 2017. Subsequently, music composer Yuvan Shankar Raja, cinematographer George C. Williams and editor Ruben were added to the project. Designers NJ Sathya and Neeraja Kona also were revealed to be in charge of the costumes of the lead actors for the film. The film, titled Irumbu Thirai, was released on 11 May 2018, to positive reviews from critics, for its story, screenplay, background score and performances (particularly those of Vishal and Arjun). It completed a 100-day box office run.

Mithran's next venture was the superhero film Hero, starring Sivakarthikeyan and Kalyani Priyadarshan in the lead roles. Mithran once again collaborated with actor Arjun and music director Yuvan Shankar Raja for the film, and debuted Bollywood actor Abhay Deol through the film, playing the main antagonist. The film released on 20 December 2019 to positive to mixed reception from critics.

Mithran then worked on his next project, Sardar, starring Karthi in the lead role.

== Filmmaking ==
Mithran's films mainly focus on thrillers and common societal themes. His films often use green tinting. As of Hero, music director Yuvan Shankar Raja, cinematographer George C. Williams, and editor Ruben are his regular collaborators. His films have focused on topics such as cybersecurity, intellectual theft, national security, espionage, and water adulteration.

Through Hero (2019) and Sardar (2022), Mithran has introduced Bollywood actors, Abhay Deol and Chunky Pandey, into Tamil cinema.

== Filmography ==
=== Film ===
Year	Title	Credited as			Role	Notes
Year	Title	Director	Writer	Actor	Role	Notes
2018	Irumbu Thirai	Yes	Yes	Yes	Xerox shop owner	special appearance
2019	Hero	Yes	Yes	Yes	Fake certificates dealer	special appearance
2022	Trigger	No	Dialogues	No	–	
2022	Sardar	Yes	Yes	Voice	Narrator	
2026	Sardar 2	Yes	Yes	No	–	
