= Rahul Thatha =

Indian actor and comedian

- Born: Udayabhanu c. 1941 (Note: He was aged 76 on 29 March 2017.)
- Occupation: Actor
- Years active: 1969–1976; 2010–present
- Known for: Naanum Rowdy Dhaan (2015)

Rahul Thatha (born as Udayabhanu) is an Indian actor and comedian who has predominantly appeared in Tamil-language films in comedy track sequences. He gained spotlight for his acting in Naanum Rowdy Dhaan (2015).

== Career ==
Udayabhanu aspired to enter the film industry at a young age after taking inspiration from films such as the James Bond film series during his childhood. In 1965, he travelled from his hometown Nagapattinam to reach Vijayaraghavapuram in Chennai with an ambition of pursuing his passion in film acting. He made the decision to move away from his hometown at the age of 20. However, he was made to wait for a considerable period of time to receive callsheet from filmmakers, and he also reportedly did not have an influence of a cinematic background. He then decided to work in hotels on a contractual basis. After a stint working as an employee at various hotels, he received contract as a caterer at the film sets and shooting locations. Thatha apparently met veteran Indian actor M. G. Ramachandran during an occasion at the film shooting spot and since then M. G. Ramachandran became Udayabhanu's mentor, and Thatha also served as M. G. Ramachandran's chef for a brief stint.

Udayabhanu subsequently received film acting opportunities starring alongside MGR in uncredited roles including Adimai Penn (1969), Rickshawkaran (1971), Idhayakkani (1975) and Uzhaikkum Karangal (1976). However, he did not receive major roles in films afterwards and made a brief appearance in Selvaraghavan's directorial venture Aayirathil Oruvan (2010). He made a comeback in film acting in a full-fledged role after a long hiatus in A. R. Murugadoss's directorial venture Kaththi (2014), which had Vijay in the pivotal role. He eventually was called up for a photoshoot to feature in Dhanush's film Maari (2015). After Vignesh Shivan wanted to cast him in Naanum Rowdy Dhaan, he asked Dhanush, who was also the producer of the film, to find someone else for the role in Maari.

His performance and screen presence as a character named Rahul Thatha who is one of the protoganist's friends in Naanum Rowdy Dhaan received acclaim from audiences, and his breakthrough role eventually raked him film acting offers from filmmakers with his character name becoming his stage name.

== Filmography ==
Uncredited roles

- Adimai Penn (1969)
- Rickshawkaran (1971)
- Idhayakkani (1975)
- Uzhaikkum Karangal (1976)
- Aayirathil Oruvan (2010)
- Soodhu Kavvum (2013)

Credited roles

- Velayudham (2011)
- Kaththi (2014)
- Purampokku Engira Podhuvudamai (2015)
- Naanum Rowdy Dhaan (2015)
- Kavalai Vendam (2016)
- Aranmanai 2 (2016)
- Muthina Kathirika (2016)
- Remo (2016)
- Ivan Thanthiran (2017)
- Kurangu Bommai (2017)
- Ippadai Vellum (2017)
- Irumbu Thirai (2018)
- Bodha (2018)
- Ghajinikanth (2018)
- Hero (2019)
- Natpuna Ennanu Theriyuma (2019)
- Gorilla (2019)
- Dha Dha 87 (2019)
- Ayogya (2019)
- Capmaari (2019)
- Kuppathu Raja (2019)
- En Sangathu Aala Adichavan Evanada (2020)
- Irandam Kuththu (2020)
- Pei Mama (2021)
- Theerkadarishi (2023)
- Lucky Man (2023)
- The Road (2023)
- Meippada Sei (2023)
- Maargan (2025)

=== Television ===
- Cooku with Comali season 3 (2022)

=== Music videos ===
- Avalukena
