= Sardar 2 =

Indian film by P. S. Mithran

- Theatrical release poster
- Directed by: P. S. Mithran
- Screenplay by: Nambi
- Story by: P. S. Mithran; Rathna Kumar; Ashameera Aiyappan; Vignesh Muniyandi
- Produced by: S. Lakshman Kumar; Ishan Saksena
- Starring: Karthi; S. J. Suryah; Malavika Mohanan; Ashika Ranganath; Rajisha Vijayan
- Cinematography: George C. Williams
- Edited by: Vijay Velukutty
- Music by: Sam C. S.
- Production companies: Prince Pictures; IVY Entertainment
- Distributed by: see below
- Release date: 10 September 2026
- Running time: 179 minutes
- Country: India
- Language: Tamil
- Box office: est.₹23.85 crore

Sardar 2 (transl. Chief 2) is a 2026 Indian Tamil-language spy action thriller film directed by P. S. Mithran. Produced by Prince Pictures and IVY Entertainment, it serves as a circumquel to Sardar (2022). The film stars Karthi in a dual role alongside Rajisha Vijayan, Balaji Sakthivel and Aadhira Pandialakshmi reprising their roles from the predecessor, with Malavika Mohanan, Ashika Ranganath and S. J. Suryah joining the cast.

Officially announced in October 2022 at the success meet of Sardar, the film's principal photography commenced in July 2024 at Chennai and ended by June 2025. The film has music and background score composed by Sam C. S. (in his 100th film) and one music composed by OfRo, cinematography handled by George C. Williams and editing by Vijay Velukutty.

Sardar 2 was released in theatres on 10 September 2026, during the Vinayagar Chaturthi weekend and received mixed reviews from critics, who praised Karthi and Suryah’s performance, production values, screenplay and social message but criticised the length, predictable narrative, Sam CS's music, editing, overstretched climax, lack of emotional connection and AI-generated visuals. The film was a box-office bomb and was deemed inferior to its predecessor.

== Plot ==
An emergency message from RAW agent Walrus to Zara warns that the deadly 1981 Black Operation has returned, threatening 1.4 billion lives. After Agent Zara dies and Walrus vanishes in Mysore, RAW Chief Manoj Bommai and DAS agents Viji, Shadow, and Django track him and locate Walrus at Mysore Palace. However, an operative of the international mercenary group, Black Dagger, is also tracking him to secure a mysterious knife made of discarded gun-shell metal. Walrus meets briefly with a veterinary doctor named Faiza before being cornered. Before dying in Viji's arms, Walrus passes him the knife, mistaking him for his father, Sardar. Viji—believing Sardar survived—uses the case to investigate. Infiltrating the RAW record room, Viji's team decodes files and discovers that DRDO Chief Michael Poyyamozhi is "Agent Tiger", the third operative from the 1981 Doku mission.

Viji meets museum curator Shekar Dattatri, the original quartermaster, who explains that "Doku" is a catastrophic Japanese WWII bio-weapon secured by three knife keys belonging to three agents: Walrus, Zara (Faiza’s mother), and Tiger. Black Dagger mercenaries target Tiger. Soon, Yogi, the mastermind and Black Dagger mercenary leader, arrives and threatens his daughter, Tamizhazhagi, to find his safe-drop location. Meanwhile, Viji learns from Faiza that her mother, who was supposedly killed by Black Dagger, left her coordinates to a safe-drop. Viji uses these coordinates to access an old military aircraft on an aircraft graveyard and find an old projector playing a 1981 debriefing tape about the original Operation Doku.

Past: In 1981, Zara, Walrus, Tiger, and a young trainee named Bose (Sardar) undertake a mission and successfully intercept a three-ton shipment of the bio-weapon antidote Colistin from Japan to save an infected Indian village. They board the cargo flight AN225 carrying the antidote at Haneda Airport. Zara and Sardar fight the soldiers on the plane. After Sardar saves a soldier, it results in the loss of half the supply and leaves a heartbroken Bose with profound guilt over the infected villagers they couldn't save. Following the 1981 mission, Zara, Walrus, and Tiger secretly preserved the bio-weapon Doku, hiding its three knife keys in hidden locations while falsely telling Bose that the weapon had been destroyed. In 2015, in Northern China, Walrus reveals to Sardar that Doku has been deactivated. This news angers Sardar, and Walrus says that humanity is still in danger because of Yogi.

Present: Viji, Faiza, and Sardar converge at the Prabalgad Fort weapons depot, and Viji and Faiza steal Doku’s core. Sardar fights Black Dagger mercenaries and confronts Yogi, revealing himself to be Yoganandan, the young boy from the 1981 infected village whom Sardar had saved, who is now planning a global "Antibiotic Apocalypse" using a mutated poultry superbug and Doku. Yogi traps Sardar on the 32nd subterranean level and steals Doku's core from Viji, leaving Sardar physically battered and emotionally shattered by the realisation that his past failure created Yogi. As Yogi escapes, Bommai's forces arrive and find Sardar. Master Dattatri convinces Bommai of Sardar's innocence of any traitorous ties, urging him to recognise that Sardar is the only one who can stop Yogi.

Chief Bommai activates Code Black as Yogi plans to crash Doku at a certain speed. During negotiations, Yogi holds Zara, who is revealed to be alive, hostage and forces Sardar to obtain the speed. Zara reveals the figure of 170km/h and urges Sardar to save the world before Yogi shoots her in the head, killing her, which shocks Faiza. Yogi then broadcasts a challenge, holding Django and Shadow hostage. Sardar realises Yogi plans to trigger a mass infection via a cable-car crash at the Mysore Dussehra parade. Sardar and Viji race to intercept the automated cable car system before it reaches the tenth pole and triggers the catastrophic impact. Viji kills Aala, Yogi's brother, the baby Yogi was holding in 1981, reverses the trigger, and shoots the bombs, crashing the cable car with a blue flame, signalling Doku’s safe deactivation. Sardar then kills Yogi.

Sardar says that Viji sacrificed while ensuring the public's safety, living up to Sardar’s legacy as a true agent. The government formally cleared Sardar of all terrorist charges. They reinstated him into RAW, where he takes the solemn oath of secrecy once again, proving that once a spy, always a spy.

== Cast ==
- Karthi in a dual role as
  - Agent "Sardar" Chandra Bose (Bose)
  - Agent "Code Red" Vijay Prakash (Viji)
- S. J. Suryah as Yoganandan "Yogi" a.k.a Black Dagger
- Malavika Mohanan as Agent Zara
- Ashika Ranganath as Faiza, Zara’s daughter
- Rajisha Vijayan as Indhrani (Cameo appearance)
- Munishkanth as Paavadaisami, Vijay’s adopted father (Cameo appearance)
- Rithvik as Timothy "Timmy" (Cameo appearance)
- Nassar as Quartermaster Shekhar Dattatri
  - Luthfudeen as young Shekhar Dattatri
- Jean Paul Lal as Airah "Aala", Yogi’s brother
- Ashish Vidhyarthi as RAW Chief Manoj Bommai
- Yogi Babu as Agent "Common Man" Django
- Nizhalgal Ravi as Agent "Shadow" Ravi
- Achyuth Kumar as Agent Walrus (Voice dubbed by P. Samuthirakani)
- Avinash as Agent "Chetta" Victor (Cameo appearance)
- Babu Antony as Agent "Tiger" Michael Poiyamozhi
- Balaji Sakthivel as Chidambaram, Bose's father
- Aadhira Pandilakshmi as Muthulakshmi, Bose’s mother
- Devadarshini as Doctor Sam
- Chinni Jayanth as Yogi's Master

== Production ==
=== Development ===
After the success of Sardar (2022), director P. S. Mithran officially announced a sequel at the success meet in October 2022. A promotional teaser for the sequel, titled Sardar 2, was screened at the event and conjunctively uploaded to YouTube, which further revealed that Karthi would reprise his roles as agent Sardar Chandra Bose and Inspector Vijay Prakash; the one-minute promo showcased Vijay Prakash, who was being suspended from the police force, being set for a new mission. (Note: As depicted in the end credits of Sardar (2022).)

Sardar 2 serves as a circumquel to the predecessor. In an August 2026 interview, Mithran recalled that he did not have any ideas for the sequel, but later revisited it as he felt Karthi's character had more drama and depth. Mithran further elaborated that the film would be set in the same world as the predecessor while having more depth and quality. The film was jointly produced by Prince Pictures along with Ishan Saksena of IVY Entertainment.

=== Pre-production ===
Mithran began writing the script for the film by August 2023 and was reportedly completed by that December. The film was further reported to be launched in February 2024 and begin filming by April. However, the launch was delayed as Mithran did not start the pre-production. Rathna Kumar joined the film as a co-writer, assisting Mithran on the script works. Ashameera Aiyappan and Vignesh Muniyandi further co-wrote the script, while Nambi wrote the screenplay.

By May 2024, Mithran commenced the pre-production process. The team began location scouting in Azerbaijan and Kazakhstan, the same month, as around 40 percent of the film being shot in international locations. During the recce, the team further shot stock footages which would be used during the film's production. The team also planned to shoot the film on sets as well and three sets were planned to be constructed in Chennai and Hyderabad.

A muhurat puja was held on 12 July at a film city in Chennai with the cast and crew. Mithran's norm technicians—cinematographer George C. Williams and stunt choreographer Dhilip Subbarayan—were retained for the film, after previously working on the predecessor; editor Vijay Velukutty, production designer Rajeevan and stunt choreographer Chethan D'Souza were further brought on board.

=== Casting ===
Varsha Varadarajan served as the casting director. In July 2024, shortly after the film's production being commenced, S. J. Suryah was confirmed to play the antagonist. Mithran considered Suryah as the primary choice for the antagonist, as the story and character had impressed him so much that he agreed to do the film immediately. Kumar also said that the team avoided writing a "typical white-collar criminal" role to Suryah, thereby leading to his character being unique from his previous roles as an antagonist.

The following month, Malavika Mohanan, Ashika Ranganath and Rajisha Vijayan were confirmed to play the female leads; Rajisha would reprise her role from the original film as Indhrani Chandra Bose. The film would also mark Ranganath's third Tamil film after Pattathu Arasan (2022) and Miss You (2024). Karthi added that Ranganath would mostly feature in a non-verbal role and had more scope to her performance over glamour for which he credited Mithran to. Since the film featured extensive action sequences, Malavika followed an intense training and diet regimen, in order to be agile and flexible.

Yogi Babu, Nassar, Achyuth Kumar, Ashish Vidyarthi, Nizhalgal Ravi, Babu Antony, Devadarshini, Chinni Jayanth and Jean Paul Lal were cast in supporting roles. Avinash and Balaji Sakthivel would reprise their roles as Agent Victor and Chidambaram, respectively, from the predecessor.

=== Filming ===
Principal photography began with the first schedule on 15 July 2024 at Prasad Labs in Chennai. On the third day of filming, while shooting an action sequence, stuntman Ezhumalai fell down from a twenty-foot rostrum and succumbed to fatal injuries; this incident resulted in the filming being temporarily halted. On 25 July, the Film Employees Federation of South India (FEFSI) cancelled the shoot for a day out of respect to the deceased stuntman and they conducted a safety awareness meeting for film artists and technicians at the Kamala Theater in Vadapalani, Chennai.

Filming silently progressed with subsequent schedules taking place in Hyderabad, Bangkok, Luton, Madurai and Kochi. In early March 2025, the team left to Mysore, for filming an action sequence. During the schedule, Karthi sustained a leg injury which led to a pause in filming and the crew subsequently returned to Chennai. Producer Lakshman Kumar issued a press statement that Karthi had twisted his foot while performing a stunt sequence, resulting in a ligament tear, and emphasised that the injury was not severe, despite the actor being advised to take rest for a week.

The team planned to resume shooting at Chennai with filming mostly taking place in sets and would continue filming in other international locations. By late March 2025, 90 percent of the film's shooting was complete. Filming wrapped in June 2025. Mithran recalled that Suryah had injured his right cheek while filming an action sequence but continued filming the portions, despite his injury.

=== Post-production ===
Post-production works commenced on 10 March 2025, and Karthi began dubbing for his portions the same day. The film featured extensive visual effects works which resulted in the prolonged delay.

== Music ==
Sardar 2

Soundtrack album by Sam C. S.
- Released: 31 August 2026
- Recorded: 2025–2026
- Genre: Feature film soundtrack
- Length: 16:23
- Language: Tamil
- Label: Sony Music India
- Producer: Sam C. S.

Sam C. S. chronology
Immortal (2026)	Sardar 2 (2026)	Enna Vilai (2026)
External audio
- Sardar 2 – Jukebox on YouTube

Singles from Sardar 2
- 1. "Mayil Veera" Released: 25 August 2026

Mithran's norm composer Yuvan Shankar Raja was earlier brought on board to compose the music for the film, replacing G. V. Prakash Kumar, who composed the first film. However, he was replaced by Sam C. S. in his 100th film as a music composer, second collaboration with Karthi after Kaithi (2019) and first with Mithran. The audio rights were acquired by Sony Music India.The first single titled "Mayil Veera" was released on 25 August 2026, which was composed by Sam C. S. and OfRo. The promo video of the song "Kon Varuvaan" was released on 5 September 2026.

Track listing
No.	Title	Lyrics	Singer(s)	Length
1.	"Kon Varuvaan"	Vivek	Alexandra Joy, Sublahshini	4:09
2.	"Pralayam Aagudhe"	Vivek	Benny Dayal	3:34
3.	"Mayil Veera" (Co-composed by OfRo)	Kaadi, Vaaheesan Rasaiya	Mukesh Mohamed, Vaaheesan Rasaiya	3:46
4.	"YaaLi Theme"	Nambi G, Lavita Lobo, The Imbachi, Zeba Tommy	Anthony Daasan, The Imbachi, Zeba Tommy, Lavita Lobo, Nambi G	1:58
5.	"Prologue Theme"	Lavita Lobo, Orlando Ambrose	Sam C. S., Orlando Ambrose	2:55
Total length:				16:23

== Marketing ==
The film's prologue was released on 31 March 2025, coinciding with Eid al-Fitr. The teaser introduced S. J. Suryah's character "Black Dagger", whom the protagonist combats with. The film's official teaser was released on 31 July 2026. The film's trailer released on 31 August 2026.

== Release ==
=== Theatrical ===
Sardar 2 was released on 10 September 2026, the eve of Vinayagar Chaturthi. Previously it was earlier scheduled for a December 2025 release, but was later postponed to the summer of 2026 and then to its current date, due to the extensive post-production process. The film would further clash with Soori's Mandaadi, releasing on the same date. Previously, both the films' release were threatened to be affected by a possible industry strike by the Tamil Film Producers Council owing to the disputes between the theatrical and digital release window, but the plans were withdrawn days later thereby having an unaffected release.

=== Distribution ===
SSR Entertainments is the distributor of this film in Kerala. Paarvathaa Entertainment, Sri Kumaran Films, Vasundhra Devi Cine Films and Kandan Films acquired the distribution in Tamil Nadu. Annapurna Studios acquired distribution rights in Andhra Pradesh and Telangana. PVR Inox Pictures acquired the rights of in North India.

=== Home media ===
The post-theatrical streaming rights have been acquired by Amazon Prime Video. The film began streaming on Amazon Prime Video from 1 October 2026 in Tamil and dubbed versions of Telugu, Hindi, Malayalam and Kannada languages.

== Reception ==
=== Critical response ===
Sardar 2 received mixed reviews from critics, who praised Karthi and Suryah’s performance, production values, screenplay and social message but criticised the length, predictable narrative, Sam CS's music, editing, overstretched climax and AI-generated visuals.

M. Suganth of The Times of India gave 2.5/5 stars and wrote, "As with Mithran's films, we get a social awareness message... if it was plastic water bottles in Sardar, here, it's overdose of antibiotics – a message that gets stated twice. Yet even this fails to feel urgent or alarming. Much like the film, it's all talk, no impact".Janani K of India Today gave 2.5/5 stars and wrote, "Sardar 2 had a genuinely solid story to tell — the second chance of a RAW agent once branded a terrorist, correcting his mistake. Predictable, yes. Convenient, yes. But it settles for generic instead, ending up as a spy thriller with far too little to take away".

Yashaswini Sri of The Indian Express gave 2.5/5 stars and wrote, "Karthi deserves a franchise because he has the range, the commitment and the audience goodwill to sustain one. Whether this franchise, in PS Mithran’s hands, can give him one that lasts beyond two films is now a genuine question".Latha Srinivasan of NDTV gave 2.5/5 stars and wrote, "On the whole, Sardar 2 is an ambitious film that's overstuffed and lengthy. Karthi is the stand out of this film whose prequel still outshines this one".

Prashanth Vallavan of Cinema Express gave 2.5/5 stars and wrote, "As a standalone experience, Sardar 2 is an entertaining watch and is never boring, but deep down, you can feel that Sardar, the spy, has far cooler stories buried inside his files. If only PS Mithran could dig deeper into the vaults".Sajin Shrijith of The Week gave 1.5/5 stars and wrote, "And there is the length. Some movies shouldn’t be three hours long, man. They are basically like that kid in the exam hall who knows he doesn’t know the answers to some of the questions, can leave an hour before the bell rings, but keeps filling the paper with useless, unrelatable passages with no logical sense — or, to borrow a line from the villain’s riddle: filling it with air. What’s the point, really?"

Bhuvanesh Chandar of The Hindu wrote, "And, as always, what joy it is to see big heroes like Karthi, also one of the finest actors of the generation, consistently champion author-backed roles like this. If not for the post-intermission blues, Sardar 2 could have been a feather in Karthi and Mithran’s caps — as a defining spy actioner that many Indian filmmakers still struggle to crack".Vishal Menon of The Hollywood Reporter India wrote, "This crash in the second half makes Sardar 2 feel like someone stapled together action set pieces with Wikipedia pages about antibiotics and modern medicine. The ending feels entirely incomplete, and the emotional depth of a character we’ve known from an earlier film adds nothing to what we feel about him now. Or maybe there’s some cleverness after all to making a film about modern medicine and intentionally making it this generic".

=== Box office ===
The film closed below ₹30 crore as it's worldwide lifetime making it a box-office bomb.

== See also ==
- List of film and television accidents
