= Ponmagal Vandhal =

2020 film by J.J. Fedrick

- Official release poster
- Directed by: J. J. Fredrick
- Written by: J. J. Fredrick
- Produced by: Suriya
- Starring: Jyothika; K. Bhagyaraj; R. Parthiban; Thiyagarajan; Pratap K. Pothan; R. Pandiarajan
- Cinematography: Ramji
- Edited by: Ruben
- Music by: Govind Vasantha
- Production company: 2D Entertainment
- Distributed by: Amazon Prime Video
- Release date: 29 May 2020
- Running time: 120 minutes
- Country: India
- Language: Tamil

Ponmagal Vandhal (transl. The precious girl has arrived) is a 2020 Indian Tamil-language legal drama film written and directed by J. J. Fredrick in his directorial debut, and produced by Suriya under his banner 2D Entertainment. The film stars Jyothika leading an ensemble cast including R. Parthiban, K. Bhagyaraj, Thiyagarajan, Pratap K. Pothan and Pandiarajan. The film featured music composed by Govind Vasantha, cinematography handled by Ramji and editing done by Ruben. It revolves around a rookie lawyer who leads to the reopening of a notorious 15-year-old case of a dead killer, alleged to have kidnapped and murdered young girls.

Ponmagal Vandhal was filmed between July 2019 and January 2020. Initially scheduled for theatrical release on 27 March 2020, it was postponed indefinitely following the closure of theatres due to the COVID-19 pandemic. The producers later planned for a direct-to-streaming release through Amazon Prime Video. Being Amazon's first Indian direct-to-streaming film and the first such Tamil film to be released on a streaming service following pandemic restrictions, the film began streaming from 29 May 2020 and received mixed reviews from critics. However, it became one of the most watched films of the year in streaming services, and Jyothika was nominated for the Filmfare Award for Best Actress – Tamil.

== Plot ==
In 2004, a North Indian woman named 'Psycho' Jothi is convicted for the murder of 2 young men, Rohit and Diwakar, and the kidnapping and serial killing of numerous young girls, and is revealed to have been killed in an encounter when she attempted to escape. 15 years later, A resident in Ooty named 'Petition' Pethuraj reopens the case, citing that Jothi is innocent and he wishes to pose a defence for her. Venba, Pethuraj's daughter and an amateur lawyer, seeks to revive the case amidst oppositions. After proving that the main eyewitness, Ramar, who had testified against Jothi, was in Chennai at the time of the murder, and that he was merely a character fabricated by the investigating officer DSP R. Alexander, Venba is successful in getting a second hearing. This leads to the public prosecutor being replaced with Rajarathinam, a renowned criminal lawyer appointed by a businessman Varadharajan, Rohit's father.

Rajarathinam is successful in proving that Venba's claims that Ramar was an illegitimate witness is false by nullifying the alibi Venba had discovered. During the next hearing, Venba reveals that Jothi was not a North Indian immigrant, but was in fact a Tamilian woman whose name was Sakthijothi. Sakthijothi had eloped with a man from a different caste and moved to Jaipur in the early 1990s, and as a result, her husband was murdered by her father and relatives in the name of honour killing. Venba asks Pethuraj to take the stand, who then testifies that a pregnant Sakthijothi had come to Ooty seeking refuge, and began to stay with Pethuraj and his wife Philomina. One day several years later, Pethuraj heard Sakthijothi's daughter's screams from the road outside the house, and witnessed Sakthijothi chasing after a car in which her daughter was being taken away, which is shown to have been Rohit and Diwakar's. Venba then shows another video footage of Jothi running with a young girl, saying that Jothi did not try to kidnap her, as the girl was Jothi's daughter, revealing that she is in fact Sakthijothi's daughter, Venba Sakthijothi. Upon confronting Varadharajan for hiding various details about the case, Rajarathinam is made to meet Alexander, who reveals several facts about the case that were never bought into light. It is revealed that Jothi had discovered the whereabouts of a dilapidated bungalow in Lovedale, which is said to have been a hide-out for Rohit and Diwakar, who used to kidnap and rape young girls there. The corpse of a young girl was found buried outside the bungalow, who was later identified as Angel, a girl who had gone missing during a school convention.

Venba claims that Alexander had committed perjury when he testified that he had arrested Jothi in Tiruppur, revealing that the arrest was made by sub-inspector Suresh Pandian. However, when she requests to summon Suresh Pandian to testify in the next hearing, Rajarathinam reveals that Suresh Pandian had committed suicide the previous night owing to work-pressure. Venba and Pethuraj are at a loss as Suresh Pandian was the ace up their sleeve. After going through an emotional setback, Venba reveals in the next hearing that she was brutally raped by Rohit and Diwakar, going on to reveal that the conviction of Jothi and the death of Suresh Pandian was all a conspiracy by Varadharajan to save his son's and his own reputation, and that DSP Alexander and the entire investigation team were in on the plot, but says she cannot prove this. However, she receives immense support from the public after this, majority of who believe in Jothi's innocence. On the day of judgement, the judge has a change of heart and summons Varadharajan to be present at the next hearing to testify. However, the judge goes on to take a bribe from Varadharajan, promising a favourable verdict, an action which is looked down upon by the former's friend, Karpooram, who reprimands him.

At the next hearing, Varadharajan takes the stand, and Venba openly accuses him of being a cutthroat criminal who has been building his reputation by silencing all those of who have raised their voice against him. The judge disallows Varadharajan to leave the courtroom until Venba's interrogation is complete, implying that he has reformed. Venba then introduces a witness who she says can confirm Varadharajan's presence at the tea factory where Jothi was shot dead, and disrespectfully asks Varadharajan why he was present there. Varadharajan then mocks the judicial system in anger, saying that they cannot convict him of anything. Venba then paints a picture of the entire crime that took place in 2004. After chasing the car in which Venba was kidnapped, a distraught Sakthijothi ran across the hamlet looking for her daughter, eventually discovering the bungalow outside which she finds Venba's clothes. She goes inside to find Venba struggling for life, and finds the corpse of another girl, who is revealed to have been Angel, who she then buries outside the bungalow. While attempting to make her way back home, she is intercepted by Rohit and Diwakar, and manages to get hold of Rohit's pistol, using which she shoots both of them dead. Despite Pethuraj's reservations, Sakthijothi hands Venba over to the couple, asking them to take care of her, and surrenders herself to Suresh Pandian. Upon Alexander's orders, an oblivious Suresh Pandian brings Sakthijothi to the tea factory, where she is shot dead by Varadharajan himself. Rajarathinam does not make a rebuttal, and Varadharajan is convicted.

At a memorial service for Sakthijothi, Rajarathinam reveals to Venba that he is aware that she is not Sakthijothi's daughter, but the young girl Angel. It is revealed that upon arriving at the bungalow, Sakthijothi had found not Angel, but Venba to be dead. After burying her daughter's corpse, Sakthijothi had saved the distraught Angel and killed the 2 young men. Upon Rajarathinam questioning why she did so much for a woman she did not even know, Angel reveals that the pain that she and Sakthijothi suffered were the same and that she will continue to live on as Sakthijothi's daughter Venba.

== Cast ==
- Jyothika as Venba / Angel / Sakthijothi (imagination)
  - Akshara Kishor as young Venba
- R. Parthiban as Rajarathnam
- K. Bhagyaraj as 'Petition' Pethuraj
- Thiyagarajan as Varatharajan
- Pratap K. Pothan as the Judge
- R. Pandiarajan as Karpooram
- Subbu Panchu as DSP R. Alexander
- Vinodhini Vaidyanathan as Venba's neighbour
- Akshara Kishor as young Venba
- Vidya Pradeep as Sakthi Jothi ('Psycho' Jyothi) in Cameo Appearance
- Gajaraj as Public Prosecutor
- Semmalar Annam K as victim's mother
- Crane Manohar as tea shop owner
- Donedone Star as Zamindar
- VJ Aashiq as Rajarathinam's assistant
- Stills Vijay
- Jeeva Ravi as Sub-Inspector Suresh Pandian
- Baby Monica as young Angel
- Srilatha as Mrs. Suresh Pandian
- Rindhu Ravi as Mrs. Philomina Pethuraj
- Bijili Ramesh as courtroom watchman (Uncredited)
- Master Kamalesh as himself (cameo appearance in the song "Pookalin Porvai")
- Gowtham Sundararajan as a police officer (cameo appearance in the song "Pookalin Porvai")
- Suriya as narrator in at end of the film

== Production ==
In July 2019, actor Suriya announced his next production under his production company 2D Entertainment is titled Ponmagal Vandhal, which was derived from a song in Sorgam (1970). The film would star Suriya's wife Jyothika and be directed by J. J. Frederick in his directorial debut. Frederick, who was an alumnus in Loyola College, Chennai; directed two short films within a year, which opened to critical acclaim and he worked as an assistant to director I. Ahmed in the proposed project Idhayam Murali, which did not happen. He pitched four of his stories to Suriya, and the latter liked one of his stories which eventually became Ponmagal Vandhal.

Frederick revealed that the film talks about the sexual assault and violence against children which is considered to be a sensitive topic and that had a great impact on the society. Though he did not approach any non-governmental organisation, he happened to approach many people who were affected by this issue. While writing the script for the film, Frederick consulted legal advisors including Rajasekhar Pandian, a co-producer of the film, and visited court proceedings as a part of his research. The technical crew consists of Govind Vasantha as the music director; Ramji handled the cinematography for the film and Ruben was in charge of the film's editing.

Once Frederick completed the script, he approached Jyothika and eventually she accepted playing the role. Though he was nervous about approaching a top actor to play the lead, he was also confident about this as he observed other young filmmakers had chance to work with top actors, for instance, Pa. Ranjith worked with Rajinikanth twice in Kabali and Kaala, and Lokesh Kanagaraj directed Vijay in Master. The other supporting cast had an ensemble of veteran filmmakers and screenwriters: Parthiban, Bhagyaraj, Pandiarajan, Pratap K. Pothan and Thiyagarajan.

Principal photography began in July 2019, following the film's announcement. During the film's shooting in Ooty, the team faced difficulties to continue production as Ooty received the highest rainfall in close to 80 years, which was considered a "challenging task" according to Frederick. Jyothika was diagnosed with high fever, as a result of film shooting in the climate, but continued to shoot her portions. Most of the film's portions were shot in a small court room set designed at Adityaram Studios in Chennai. Following the completion of major schedules in Ooty and Kodaikanal, the team headed to Chennai for the last filming schedule, where the scenes in court room set were filmed. Though shooting was completed within November 2019, the team had to film patchwork scenes extending the schedule. Production was completed in January 2020.

== Soundtrack ==
Ponmagal Vandhal

Soundtrack album by Govind Vasantha
- Released: 18 May 2020
- Recorded: 2019–2020
- Genre: Feature film soundtrack
- Length: 15:10
- Language: Tamil
- Label: Sony Music India
- Producer: Govind Vasantha

Govind Vasantha chronology
Jaanu (2020)	Ponmagal Vandhal (2020)	Taish (2020)

The soundtrack was composed by Govind Vasantha, with lyrics written by Vivek and Uma Devi. A single from the film titled "Vaa Chellam" sung by Jyothika's sister-in-law Brindha Sivakumar, was released on 6 March 2020. The second single titled "Vaan Thooralgal", sung by Chinmayi, was released on 17 April 2020. The complete album, featuring five tracks, was released by Sony Music India on 18 May 2020.

Track listing
No.	Title	Lyrics	Singer(s)	Length
1.	"Vaa Chellam"	Vivek	Brindha Sivakumar	2:38
2.	"Pookalin Porvai"	Vivek	Sean Roldan, Keerthana Vaidyanathan	3:49
3.	"Vaan Thooralgal"	Uma Devi	Chinmayi	3:29
4.	"Kalaigiradhey Kanave"	Uma Devi	Govind Vasantha	3:12
5.	"Vaanamai Naan"	Uma Devi	Saindhavi, Govind Vasantha	2:07
Total length:				15:10

== Release ==
Ponmagal Vandhal was originally scheduled for a theatrical release on 27 March 2020. But the Tamil Nadu government led by Chief Minister Edappadi K. Palaniswami had ordered for a closure of theatres in order to curb COVID-19 pandemic spread, resulting the film to be postponed indefinitely. In April 2020, the filmmakers started negotiating with the streaming service Amazon Prime Video to release the film directly there, thus becoming the first time in Tamil cinema, that a film premiered on a streaming service, rather than a traditional theatrical release.

Members of the Tamil Nadu Theatre Owners Association were upset with the developments of the film's direct-to-streaming release, citing that a films made for cinemas should primarily have a theatrical release first and then release on streaming services. The association had also called for a boycott of Suriya's films and films produced by his banner 2D Entertainment, citing potential financial losses for theatres. However, other Tamil film producers welcomed the move as they have all rights to sell their film to any streaming services to recover the loss and other industries had started this move. Following a public meeting with distributors, exhibitors and film producers, the members later announced that producers of small and medium-budget films can have options to sell the film rights to streaming services, while no big-budget films can be released directly; although Suriya sold his big-budget film Soorarai Pottru to the same streaming service for a direct-to-streaming release.

Ponmagal Vandhal was Amazon's first Indian film and the mainstream Tamil film to have a direct-to-streaming release. On 15 May 2020, Amazon Prime Video officially confirmed the release of seven Indian films distributed by the platform, including another Tamil film Penguin. The official trailer of this film was released on 21 May 2020; to have a wide reach among the audiences across South India, the film's trailer was simultaneously telecasted across 31 television channels in Tamil Nadu, and received over 20 million views through YouTube and televisions. The film began streaming on Amazon Prime Video from 29 May 2020.

=== Critical reception ===
The film received mixed reviews from critics. M. Suganth of The Times of India rated it 2 stars out of 5, saying, "both in its writing and making, there is a strong made-for-TV feel about this project [...] As far as courtroom dramas go, Ponmagal Vandhal is decidedly lacklustre. Instead of fiery dialogues and charged arguments between the opposing lawyers what we get are emotional statements being passed off as explosive proof." Baradwaj Rangan wrote for Film Companion, "Ponmagal Vandhal is about something everyone should know, worry about, want to do something about. It's about the burden of trauma, a life lived with the memory of childhood abuse that doesn't stop with the event itself but seeps into your cells as you grow up, forever altering your identity, your perception of self. But the director doesn't trust his material. He doesn't trust the audience enough to feel that this "issue" is enough, and doesn't need to be cheaply sensationalised ". Pradeep Kumar of The Hindu commended the film's delivery of a "powerful line of messaging" but noted that it "falls prey to the Tamil cinema formula", not affording enough time for viewers to process the emotions.

Rediff.com's Divya Nair rated 1 out of 5 stars, stating "It is unfair that good actors like Jyotika and Parthiban are wasted in what could have been a spectacular courtroom drama, backed by facts and evidence rather than tears and words." Shubhra Gupta of The Indian Express rated 2 out of 5 stars stating "Jyotika carries the film with her performance. But the film fails its own subject by its insensitivity: training the camera on battered and bleeding little girls this way is more prurient than anything else. Wanting to make films about important issues is important, but the execution is even more important." Gauthaman Bhaskaran of News18 rated 1.5 out of 5 stars stating "There is very little novelty in Ponmagal Vandhal, except for the fact that Jyotika's Venba uses tears and emotions to convince the judge with very little hard evidence to prove her point!" Writing for The New Indian Express, Sudhir Srinivasan stated "For a film about a buried crime that gets unravelled after an old case is reopened, the court proceedings feel frustratingly spurious."

In a positive review, Ranjani Krishnakumar of Firstpost rated 3.5 out of 5 stars stating "Ponmagal Vandhal fits perfectly into Jyotika's pursuit. Every film is a milestone in her single-minded journey of women's empowerment. This milestone is one of empathy. Ponmagal Vandhal is the story of Venba who put herself in the shoes of another woman. But it is also a clarion call for all of us to believe women's stories." and further went on to say "To appreciate Jyotika's filmography, one must buy into her pursuit. During promotions for the film, she has been repeatedly saying that the 'message' in the film is what attracted her to it. And that she wants to make films that her children are proud of. Naturally, her films come with a lot of editorialising. Ponmagal Vandhal is no different." Janani K of India Today gave 3 out of 5 stars, saying it "delivers a strong message about the judicial system, sexual abuse and the trauma that survivors go through. Apart from a few flaws in the screenplay, the film touches upon a sensitive topic that the country doesn't quite pay heed to."

Hindustan Times-based critic Haricharan Pudipeddi wrote "Jyotika's films, unlike most women-centric Tamil films, aren't run-of-the-mill and always serve a purpose. Ponmagal Vandhal, too, has a purpose and it's a laudable attempt by first-time filmmaker JJ Fredrick, who gives us a legal drama that asks quite a few uncomfortable questions about the safety of young girls. The court-room scenes get slightly dramatic, but the message never gets preachy". Sowmya Rajendran of The News Minute gave 3 out of 5 stars and said, "Ponmagal Vandhal is ambitious in what it wants to do and Fredrick has good instincts as a filmmaker. He only needs to trust his material and medium more."

== Accolades ==
- At the 67th Filmfare Awards South, Jyothika was nominated for the Filmfare Award for Best Actress – Tamil.
- Tamil Nadu State Film Award for Best Film Portraying Women in a Good Light - Jyothika & Suriya
- Edison Award for Best Actress - Jyothika
