= Brindha Sivakumar =

Indian playback singer (born 1980)

- Born: 3 March 1980 (age 45); Chennai, Tamil Nadu, India
- Occupations: Playback singer; Voice artist
- Years active: 2018–present
- Spouse: Sivakumar (m. 2005)
- Children: 2

Brindha Sivakumar (born 3 March 1980) is an Indian playback singer and voice artist who works in Tamil-language films. She is the daughter of actor Sivakumar and the younger sister of actors Suriya and Karthi.

== Career ==
While Brindha was studying grade 10, Karthik Raja called her for a recording, but Brindha declined the offer since her board exams were near. She was initially offered Simran's role in Kannathil Muthamittal (2002) by assistant director Sudha Kongara but declined the role. She made her debut as a playback singer with Mr. Chandramouli (2018). Brindha sang the title track for the film. She was called to sing a song for the film after Dhananjayan, a family friend and the film's producer, listened to her voice while she was singing a prayer song for Agaram Foundation. She went on to sing a song in Raatchasi (2019). In a review of the soundtrack by The Times of India, the reviewer wrote that "The second song, Nee Yen Nanbanae, is ... a soothing melody sung by Brindha Sivakumar". Her next song was in the film Jackpot (2019) and a critic from The Times of India stated that "Sinduri Vishal and Brindha Sivakumar have gone full throttle to bring out the energy in the number without letting the tempo slip even a wee bit".

== Personal life ==
Brindha's father, Sivakumar; brothers, Suriya and Karthi; and sister-in-law, Jyothika; are all actors who work in the Tamil film industry. In 2005, Brindha married a granite industrialist who shares the same name as her father, Sivakumar. They have a son and daughter.

== Discography ==
Year	Film	Song	Composer	Co-singers	Lyricist
2018	Mr. Chandramouli	"Mr. Chandramouli" (Theme)	Sam C. S.	Sam C. S.	Vithya Damodharan
2019	Raatchasi	"Nee Yen Nanbanae"	Sean Roldan	Solo	Yugabharathi
2019	Jackpot	"Shero Shero"	Vishal Chandrashekhar	Sinduri Vishal	Vivek
2020	Ponmagal Vandhal	"Vaa Chellam"	Govind Vasantha	Solo	Vivek
2022	O2	"Swasamae"	Vishal Chandrashekhar	Solo	Rajesh Giriprasad, Mohan Rajan

== Voice artist ==
Film title	Actress	Role	Original language	Dub language	Original release year	Dub release year	Notes
Brahmāstra: Part One – Shiva	Alia Bhatt	Isha Chatterjee	Hindi	Tamil	2022	2022	
