= O2 (2022 film) =

Indian survival film

O_{2}
- Official release poster
- Directed by: G. S. Viknesh
- Written by: G. S. Viknesh
- Produced by: S. R. Prakash Babu; S. R. Prabhu
- Starring: Nayanthara
- Cinematography: Thamizh A Azhagan
- Edited by: Selva R. K.
- Music by: Vishal Chandrasekar
- Production company: Dream Warrior Pictures
- Distributed by: Disney+ Hotstar
- Release date: 17 June 2022
- Running time: 120 minutes
- Country: India
- Language: Tamil

O2 (stylized as O_{2} ) is a 2022 Indian Tamil-language survival film written and directed by G. S. Viknesh and produced by Dream Warrior Pictures. It stars Nayanthara and Rithvik (in his debut as a child actor). It received mixed reviews upon its release but most commentators praised the actors' performances, in particular Nayanthara's.

== Plot ==
Parvathy is a single mother whose son Veera, has cystic fibrosis. Veera cannot breathe normally and needs an oxygen cylinder to breathe. Parvathy's brother, who works as a surgeon, had planned to perform surgery on Veera the following week in Cochin. The mother and son board a bus from Coimbatore with two oxygen cylinders, one with Veera and another one in a suitcase. Due to heavy traffic, the bus did not stop at any point and only proceeded towards Cochin. 11 passengers are on the bus including the driver and the bus conductor. After some time, a policeman mistakes the private bus for a city bus and argues with the conductor to travel to Palakkad. Still, unfortunately, a landslide occurs and the bus conductor dies after being knocked into the glass window of the bus. They all end up underneath the mud trapped near a mountain, and are all fighting for survival. They try calling on their phones, but the signals don't reach them. They want oxygen and they all start sweating and become nauseated. The policeman incites them to kill Veera and get the oxygen cylinder but Parvathy fights them off. However, Parvathy has nausea and becomes unconscious. Veera opens the oxygen cylinder. A rescue team then rescues eight of them as the MLA, PA and another person were killed by the policeman. Veera is saved by giving shock treatment. After surgery in Cochin, Veera can now breathe like a normal child.

== Cast ==
- Nayanthara as Parvathy
- Rithvik as Veera
- Barath Neelakantan as police officer
- Aadukalam Murugadoss as bus driver
- R. N. R. Manohar as Ex-MLA
- Lena as Manorama
- Shah Ra as Parvathy's Brother
- Rishikanth as Rafiq
- Jaffar Idukki as Bus Passenger
- Pankan as Adheera Vavachi
- Tharani Sureshkumar as Mitra

== Music ==
The music is composed by Vishal Chandrasekar, with lyrics written by Rajesh Giriprasad and Mohan Rajan. The first single, "Swasamae", sung by Brindha Sivakumar, was released on 26 May 2022. The second single, "Vaanam Yaavum", sung by Pradeep Kumar, was released on 14 June 2022.

No.	Title	Singer(s)	Length
1.	"Swasamae"	Brindha Sivakumar	3:01
2.	"Vaanam Yaavum"	Pradeep Kumar	4:13
Total length:			7:14

== Release ==
The film was digitally released on 17 June 2022 through Disney+ Hotstar.

== Reception ==
Most critics praised the actors' performances, with one reviewer describing O2 as an "engaging survival drama". Manoj Kumar of The Indian Express gave the movie 3 out of 5 stars, commending Nayanthara's performance. The News Minute's Priyanka Thirumurthy, rating the movie 3.5 out of 5, wrote that Nayanthara's character is "unapologetically selfish, self-serving and downright violent". Logesh Balachandran of The Times of India rated the film 3 out of 5, doubting Viknesh's work, but praised that it could keep viewers "hooked" with "distinct characters". Haricharan Pudipeddi from Hindustan Times praised the chemistry between Nayanthra and Rithvik. Latha Srinivasan from Moneycontrol praised the film's concept and performances of Nayanthara and Rithvik but criticisied its execution. Ashameera Aiyappan of Firstpost rated the film 2 out of 5 stars and found that O2 "[fell] flat" other than the performances.

The story was met with a negative response. While some found the story "improper" and "a joke", Sibby Jayya of India Herald stated that the survival genre is not "well-established". The Quint gave a rating of 2.5 out of 5. Gautaman Bhaskaran of News 18 gave 1.5 stars out of 5.
