= Rithvik Jothi Raj =

Indian actor and YouTuber

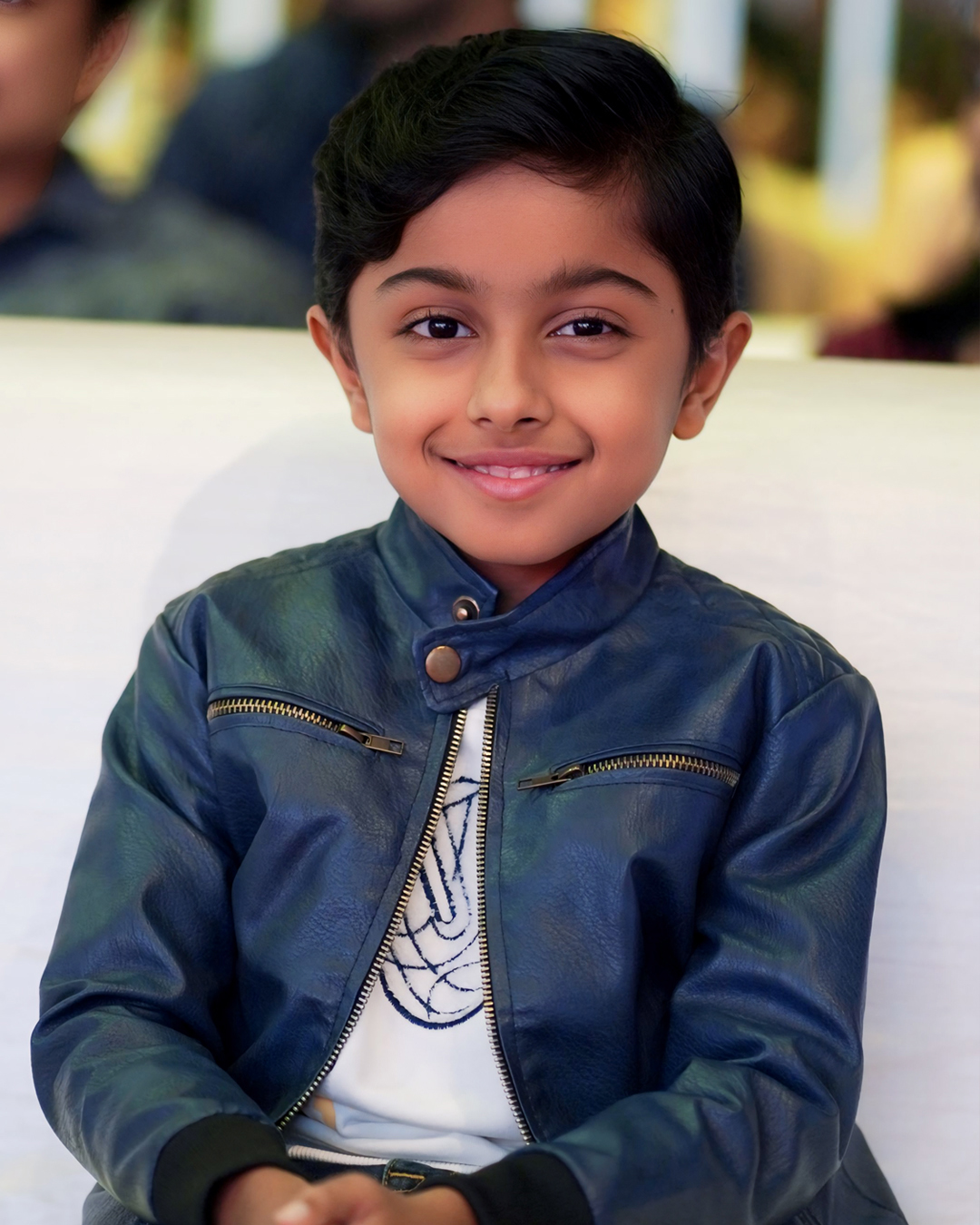
- Other name: Rithu Rocks Rithvik
- Occupations: YouTuber; actor
- Years active: 2021-present

YouTube information
- Channel: Rithvik Jothiraj
- Subscribers: 2.97 million
- Views: 552 million
- Last updated: 24 July 2026

Rithvik Jothiraj is an Indian YouTuber and actor who works predominantly in South Indian films.

== Personal life and career ==
Rithvik is from Coimbatore and is known for his YouTube channel Rithu Rocks in which he enacts all the characters in the videos. His video titled Breaking News involving him playing a news anchor, a reporter and a farmer. The video became viral after being marketed by Tamada Media. He has since featured in several other videos such as Android Arasan, worked on ads such as Pothys, and films such as O2 and Jailer.

== Filmography ==
Year	Film	Role	Notes
2022	O2	Veera	Won—Edison Award for Best Child Actor
2022	Sardar	Timothy "Timmy"	Won—Edison Award for Best Child Actor
2023	Jailer	Rithvik	
2023	800	Young Muttiah Muralitharan	
2024	Lucky Baskhar	Karthik	Telugu film
2026	Sardar 2	Timothy "Timmy"	Cameo appearance
2026	Jailer 2	Rithvik	

=== Selected videography ===
Year	Title	Ref.
2021	Breaking News	
2021	Android Arasan	
2021	Kanchana Returns	
