= Bodha (film) =

2018 Tamil crime comedy film

- Film poster
- Directed by: Suresh G.
- Written by: Suresh G.
- Produced by: Ramani Ramachandran
- Starring: Vicky Mippu
- Cinematography: Rathina Kumar
- Edited by: Thiyagarajan
- Music by: Siddharth Vipin
- Release date: 2 July 2018
- Country: India
- Language: Tamil

Bodha (transl. Addiction) is a 2018 Indian Tamil-language crime comedy film directed by debutant Suresh and starring newcomer Vicky and Mippu, while Vinoth Munna, Eswar, Rahul Thatha, and Shanmugasundaram play supporting roles. The music was composed by Siddharth Vipin with cinematography by Rathina Kumar and editing by Thiyagarajan. The film released on 2 July 2018. It was dubbed in Telugu as Call Boy.

== Cast ==
- Vicky as Madhan
- Mippu as Karthik
- Vinoth Munna as an inspector
- Eswar as an agent
- Rahul Thatha as a hipster
- Shanmugasundaram as the father-in-law
- Risha in a special appearance in the song "We Love You Money"

== Soundtrack ==
Soundtrack was composed by Siddharth Vipin.

- Ambala Item - Guru, Siddharth Vipin
- We Love You Money - Jagadeesh, Siddharth Vipin

== Release ==
The Times of India gave the film a rating of two out of five stars and wrote that "The comic bits are hardly funny while the thriller elements are barely there". Deccan Chronicle gave the film the same rating and wrote that "Though the script had all the potential to make it an interesting movie, a lacklustre writing and incoherent screenplay turns Bodha an ordinary fare". The New Indian Express stated that "Bodha is a film about money and what people do for it. It's too bad the film isn't good enough to justify the money you part with to see it". Vikatan criticized the screenplay, the cinematography, and the background music.
