= Vaa Vaathiyaar =

2026 Indian film by Nalan Kumarasamy

- Theatrical release poster
- Directed by: Nalan Kumarasamy
- Written by: Nalan Kumarasamy
- Produced by: K. E. Gnanavel Raja
- Starring: Karthi; Krithi Shetty; Sathyaraj; Rajkiran
- Cinematography: George C. Williams
- Edited by: Vetre Krishnan
- Music by: Santhosh Narayanan
- Production company: Studio Green
- Release date: 14 January 2026
- Running time: 129 minutes
- Country: India
- Language: Tamil
- Budget: ₹40 crore
- Box office: est. ₹10 crore

Vaa Vaathiyaar (transl. Come Teacher) (Note: Vaathiyaar is also a reference to the actor-politician M. G. Ramachandran.) is a 2026 Indian Tamil-language action comedy film written and directed by Nalan Kumarasamy. Produced by K. E. Gnanavel Raja under Studio Green, the film stars Karthi as a man who finds himself clashing with his grandfather's expectations of him after being raised as an alter ego of MGR. The cast also includes Krithi Shetty, Sathyaraj, and Rajkiran.

The film was officially announced in October 2023 under the tentative title Karthi 26, as it is the actor's 26th film as a lead actor, and the official title was announced in May 2024. Principal photography took place across almost two years from March 2023 to February 2025, predominantly in Chennai. The film has music composed by Santhosh Narayanan, cinematography handled by George C. Williams and editing by Vetre Krishnan.

After facing several delays due to legal and financial issues, Vaa Vaathiyaar was released on 14 January 2026, on the occasion of Pongal to mixed reviews from critics and was a box-office bomb.

== Cast ==
- Karthi as DSP Rameshwaran J. "Ramu"
  - Rayan M. as eight-year-old Ramu
  - B. Akshay Krishna as twelve-year-old Ramu
- Krithi Shetty as Wu
- Sathyaraj as Periyasamy
- Rajkiran as Ramu's grandfather
- Vadivukkarasi as Devayani, Ramu's grandmother
- Anandaraj as M. G. Ramachandran imitator
- Nizhalgal Ravi as the Chief Minister of Tamil Nadu
- Yaar Kannan as Home Minister
- Shilpa Manjunath as Malini
- Karunakaran as Govindharaman
  - Kamalesh Jagan as twelve-year-old Govindharaman
- G. M. Sundar as Mani
- Ramesh Thilak as Muthu
- P. L. Thenappan as B. Jaiganesh, Ramu's father
- Vidhya Borgia as Ramu's mother
- Yog Japee as Hypnotist
- Praveen Kannur as Manjal Mugam hacker
- Nivas Adithan as Nivas Adithan
- Aroul D. Shankar as Prathap Kumar
- Jai Krishna
- Rahul Gunasekaran
- Vigneshkumar
- Madhuri Watts as Sapna, Manjal Mugam hacker
- Cheran Durai
- Ra Ra
- Shiyas Kottakodan as M. G. Ramachandran
- Ajith Koshy as DCP
- Vaiyapuri as Constable
- G. Gnanasambandan as Court judge
- Carl A. Harte as PELQO CEO
- Theni Murugan as Dheeran

Uncredited

- Bobby Simha as Burma (cameo appearance)
- Mirchy Kemy (cameo appearance)

== Production ==
=== Development ===
In late July 2018, Nalan Kumarasamy, who had collaborated with Studio Green for Soodhu Kavvum (2013) and Kadhalum Kadandhu Pogum (2016), was reported to have been hired to direct a venture under the production house. The script work was reportedly progressing and the project would start once the work finished. In mid July 2020, the project was reported to star Vijay Sethupathi in the lead role, collaborating with Nalan for the third time after the mentioned. However, in mid February 2021, Arya was reported play the lead role. It was reported that Arya would be seen in a never seen before avatar and the genre would be new to the industry. The project was reported to commence filming after Arya finished filming his film Enemy (2021). In the meantime, Nalan reportedly continued script works.

It was then later reported to commence in November, however, the sources were dismissed as no reports were until, in early January 2023, Karthi was reported to star in the lead role. In mid February, the filming was reported to began in the first week of March and would star Gayatri Badwaraj in the lead role alongside Karthi. Krithi Shetty joined the cast in March. In early October, Sathyaraj was announced playing a role in the film. On 25 October, on the occasion of Kumarasamy's birthday, the project was officially announced by the producers. Anandaraj was confirmed playing a role in the film, as he was seen in the still that was released. Santhosh Narayanan, Leo John Paul and George C. Williams were announced as composer, editor and cinematographer for the film, respectively. The film serves as a tribute to actor/politician M. G. Ramachandran.

=== Filming ===
Principal photography commenced on 27 March 2023, with the first schedule in Chennai. Although filming was nearly complete by June 2024, it wrapped by February 2025.

== Music ==
Vaa Vaathiyaar

Soundtrack album by Santhosh Narayanan
- Released: 4 December 2025
- Recorded: 2024–2025
- Genre: Feature film soundtrack
- Language: Tamil
- Labels: Think Music India; Saregama
- Producer: Santhosh Narayanan

Santhosh Narayanan chronology
Thalaivan Thalaivii (2025)	Vaa Vaathiyaar (2025)	Maa Inti Bangaaram (2026)

Singles from Vaa Vaathiyaar
- 1. "Uyir Pathikaama" Released: 14 February 2025; 2. "Aalapikkey Ummak" Released: 27 November 2025; 3. "Mu Dha La Li" Released: 2 December 2025

External audio
- Vaa Vaathiyaar – Jukebox on YouTube

The music and background score is composed by Santhosh Narayanan, in his third collaboration with Nalan after Soodhu Kavvum (2013) and Kadhalum Kadandhu Pogum (2016); third with Karthi after Madras (2014) and Kaashmora (2016). The audio rights were acquired by Think Music India. The first single "Uyir Pathikaama" was released on 14 February 2025. The second single titled "Aalapikkey Ummak" was released on 27 November 2025. The third single titled "Mu Dha La Li" was released on 2 December 2025.

Track listing
No.	Title	Lyrics	Singer(s)	Length
1.	"Uyir Pathikaama"	Vivek	Vijay Narain, Aditya Ravindran, Santhosh Narayanan	3:28
2.	"Aalapikkey Ummak"	Kelithee	Kelithee, Santhosh Narayanan	3:08
3.	"Mu Dha La Li"	Durai	Santhosh Narayanan, Sublahshini	2:36
4.	"Greatest of The Greatest"	OfRo	OfRo	1:07
5.	"Yaar Manidhan"	Santhosh Narayanan	Santhosh Narayanan	3:21
6.	"Vaalile Samurai X Rajavin Paarvai"	Vaali, Muthamil	Sathyan Mahalingam, Vijaynarain, Brinda	3:33

== Marketing ==
The first look poster, released on 25 May 2024, revealed the film's title. The teaser trailer was released on 13 November 2024, a day prior to the release of Studio Green's Kanguva (2024), to enable it to be screened in theatres along with the film.

== Release ==
=== Theatrical ===
Vaa Vaathiyaar was theatrically released on 14 January 2026, on the occasion of Pongal. A dubbed Telugu version titled Annagaru Vostaru, was released directly on Amazon Prime Video on 28 January 2026. Annagaru Vostaru was re-released in March 2026 with altered visuals after the original dubbed version was criticised for localisation errors; while the original Tamil version includes visual and verbal references to M. G. Ramachandran, the Telugu version includes verbal references to N. T. Rama Rao but erroneously retained Ramachandran's visuals, which were changed to Rama Rao's for re-release.

Vaa Vaathiyaar was initially planned to release during the week of Pongal in 2025, but was later postponed to 5 December the same year. However, in early December, the Madras High Court issued a stay on the film's release due to the producer's pending loans. Amidst this, the makers announced a new date of 12 December. A day before the scheduled date, it was postponed indefinitely as the loans remained unpaid. Shortly thereafter, it was reported that the makers were aiming to release the film on 24 December—the death date of M. G. Ramachandran—intending to resolve the financial matters by then. However, the Supreme Court of India later upheld the Madras High Court's ban on the film, dismissing Studio Green's appeal to overturn it. Despite this, the production company announced a Pongal release for 14 January 2026 on 10 January, while the loans were repaid in full, allowing the film's release.

=== Distribution ===
Sakthi Film Factory acquired the Tamil Nadu distribution rights of the film. The distribution rights for Kerala were bought by Sree Gokulam Movies, while it was released in Karnataka by Think Studios through VK Films.

The overseas distribution rights were acquired by Phars Film. Distributing themselves in the Gulf Cooperation Council (GCC), they sold the USA rights to Prathyangira Cinemas, Malaysia rights to DMY Creations, Canada rights to York Cinemas, and Australia, New Zealand and Singapore rights to Home Screen Entertainment.

Due to the short interval between the confirmation of the film's release on 14 January and its scheduled release date, several overseas territories, including the United States, were unable to secure screening slots in time and were therefore compelled to postpone the release by a few days.

=== Home media ===
The post-theatrical digital streaming rights of the film were acquired by Amazon Prime Video. The film began streaming there from 28 January 2026.

== Reception ==
=== Critical response ===
Vaa Vaathiyaar received mixed reviews from critics.

M Suganth of The Times of India gave 3 out of 5 stars and wrote "Vaa Vaathiyaar shows that in this age of hyper-masculine action — and even romantic — films, it's still possible to make a rousing commercial entertainer with a star without relying on guns and gratuitous bloodshed." Janani K of India Today gave 2.5 out of 5 stars and wrote "Vaa Vaathiyaar is a film with a fascinating concept that ultimately plays it safe. Nalan Kumarasamy's vision is evident in the quirky characters and unique setup, but the execution doesn't match the ambition." Anusha Sundar of OTT Play gave 2.5 out of 5 stars and wrote "Vaa Vaathiyaar has an honest and charming Karthi, who executes the vision of Nalan Kumarasamy to the best of his capabilities. But on paper, Nalan Kumarasamy misses out on carving the details and niches his films are known for."

Avinash Ramachandran of Cinema Express gave 2.5 out of 5 stars and wrote "Despite having a fantastical element at the centre of things, Vaa Vaathiyaar is Nalan's most simplistic and straightforward film." Latha Srinivasan of NDTV gave 2.5 out of 5 stars and wrote " Nalan Kumarasamy's writing is what has failed the film and his attempt to combine the MGR-Nambiar personalities and psychology, doesn't succeed. [...] Vaa Vaathiyaar is a film that rests solely on Karthi's performance instead of building up on Nalan Kumarasamy's masterful screenplay and that's a letdown." Anandu Suresh of The Indian Express gave 1.5 out of 5 stars and wrote "While Indian 2 had that so-bad-it's-good quality, the Karthi-starrer is simply unimpressive and thus doesn't even qualify for an entertaining hate-watch." Bhuvanesh Chandar of The Hindu wrote "Karthi's superheroic tribute to MGR fails to build up on its promising set-up and ends up as a hotchpotch masala entertainer that lacks ambition and flavour."

=== Box office ===
Vaa Vaathiyaar opened to ₹1.5 crore (US$160,000) domestically, which The Times of India reported was a decent opening based on Karthi's previous film openings. By day 2, the film had crossed a total collection of ₹6 crore (US$640,000) worldwide. The film concluded as Karthi's lowest-grossing film.
