= Hero (2019 Tamil film) =

2019 film directed by P. S. Mithran

- Theatrical release poster
- Directed by: P. S. Mithran
- Written by: P. S. Mithran; Pon Parthiban; Savari Muthu; Antony Bhagyaraj
- Produced by: Kotapadi J. Rajesh; T. Ezhumalaiyan
- Starring: Sivakarthikeyan; Arjun; Kalyani Priyadarshan; Ivana; Abhay Deol
- Cinematography: George C. Williams
- Edited by: Ruben
- Music by: Yuvan Shankar Raja
- Production company: KJR Studios
- Release date: 20 December 2019
- Running time: 164 minutes
- Country: India
- Language: Tamil

Hero is a 2019 Indian Tamil-language superhero film directed by P. S. Mithran, who co-wrote the film with Pon Parthiban, Savari Muthu and Antony Bhagyaraj. The film was produced by Kotapadi J. Rajesh under his production house KJR Studios. It stars Sivakarthikeyan, Arjun, Kalyani Priyadarshan, Ivana and Abhay Deol in prominent roles. This film marks the Tamil film debuts of Kalyani and Deol. The music for the film is composed by Yuvan Shankar Raja, with cinematography done by George C. Williams, and editing done by Ruben.

The film was wide released on 20 December 2019. Prior to its release, filmmaker Bosco Prabhu accused Mithran for plagiarising his story. In April 2020, the Madras High Court issued an interim order banning the film from television and streaming platforms, due to which it was taken down from Amazon Prime Video. The ban was lifted in May 2020 once the issue was resolved. The film received generally positive to mixed reviews, with praise directed towards the performances ( particularly Sivakarthekeyan and Arjun), cinematography, story, action sequences and themes, and criticism for its screenwriting, characterization and pacing.

== Plot ==
Sakthivel "Sakthi" is a young boy who dreams of becoming a superhero, like Shaktimaan. After being ridiculed by his teacher and classmates for believing that Shaktimaan is real, Sakthi tries to prove it by falling off the terrace of his school, injuring himself in the process. His father tries to convince Sakthi that Shaktimaan is fictitious by showing the disclaimer of the actor Mukesh Khanna advising viewers that the events depicted in the show are purely fictitious, causing Sakthi to abandon his hopes of becoming a superhero.

Years later, Sakthi and Inbaraj, a.k.a. "Ink", are friends who earn their livelihood as educational brokers and run a Xerox shop in their neighborhood that houses a certificate forgery unit to provide individuals forged degrees to secure their desired jobs for exorbitant sums. Sakthi bumps into Meera, a social worker at an educational fair and falls in love with her. Meera happens to be the inspiration of Sakthi's friend Mathi, a brilliant girl who aspires to become an aeronautical engineer. Mathi devises an engine that runs on saltwater as a measure to help her father and many others thwart the problem of rising petrol prices. Meera soon learns of Sakthi's true profession and confronts him, where she learns the reason behind his dark profession; his father disowned him after Sakthi confessed to him that, in spite of securing district rank in the higher secondary examinations, he had sold his certificate in order to obtain money to save his father through surgery as he was suffering from a fatal lung infection.

Meera advises Sakthi to help Mathi secure an admission in an engineering college without any payment in order to redeem himself. Sakthi tries to secure admission for Mathi but to no avail. He learns that the only way to help Mathi secure a seat is to demonstrate the practical applications of her engine which is rejected by Sathyamoorthy, Mathi's teacher who runs a school for the academically weak but brilliant children. Sakthi bypasses his warnings and demonstrates the engine at an educational fair by attaching it to an auto rickshaw. This attracts the attention of the henchman of Mahadev. In turn, he promises a seat for Mathi with a full scholarship. The next day, the auto rickshaw is seized by the police, and Mathi is arrested on the grounds of Patent violation. The court convicts her guilty of the charges. Mathi is completely distraught and attempts suicide by jumping off a running train.

Sakthi takes her to the hospital, only for the doctors to delay her treatment, and she eventually succumbs to her injuries. Sakthi and Ink are also convicted guilty and are placed on the wanted list for aiding Mathi. Sakthi, who is on the run decides that the only way to avenge Mathi's death and prove her innocence is to confront the company issuing the patents. Due to his experience in forging certificates, he easily fishes out the fact that the patent was forged by the company under Mahadev's orders, but is attacked in the process when he is rescued by Sathyamoorthy wearing a mask. Sathyamoorthy explains to him that Mahadev is a corrupt geneticist and industrialist whose aim is to wipe out innovation in work culture. He also subdues brilliant students and subjects them to lobotomy, rendering their frontal cortex unusable, therefore reducing them to his "puppets". He uses their innovations to sell them to foreign companies and earn profits.

Sathyamoorthy also explains his past; being an advocate of innovation and logical thinking, he tried various ways to inculcate the same in the school curriculum but was faced with opposition and his school was eventually blown up by Mahadev's men, killing the brilliant students. Sathyamoorthy survived the incident but was beaten up and paralyzed by Mahadev's cronies. Thereafter, Sathyamoorthy secretly nurtured the surviving children away from Mahadev in the outskirts of the city. Sakthi, upon hearing Sathyamoorthy's story, decides to fight the system along with him and the children, donning the mantle of the "Mask." Using the gadgets developed by the children and Sathyamoorthy's training, Sakthi fights through Mahadev's henchmen and eventually learns the truth. Sathyamoorthy apparently sacrifices himself in the struggle, prompting Sakthi to telecast the innovative inventions of students and explaining to the audience that children should be given the freedom to follow their passion and not be just mere bookworms.

Sakthi also tells the parents to check their children's journals to find out their interests and desires and encourage the same. Sakthi's father, who happens to hear the telecast, finds Sakthi's journal and realizes his mistake of mistreating Sakthi. In the final fight, Mahadev's plans are foiled, and Sakthi kills him by injecting a pathogen. Six months later while still on the wanted list, Sakthi runs the school along with Meera on the outskirts of the city. A cop approaches him and takes him in his jeep around the city, where Sakthi finds major developments in the city due to the innovations of Mathi and other brilliant students. The officer tosses away the documents relating to Sakthi's charges as he had opened his eyes about his child's dreams and requests Sakthi to continue on with the mantle of the Mask. In the post-credits scene, it is also revealed that Sathyamoorthy is alive and is helping Sakthi in his missions.

== Cast ==
- Sivakarthikeyan as Sakthivel "Sakthi" / Mask
  - Raghavan as young Sakthivel
- Arjun as Sathyamoorthy "Moorthy"/Mask
- Kalyani Priyadarshan as Meera (Voice dubbed by Chinmayi)
- Ivana as Mathi
- Abhay Deol as Mahadev
- Shyam Krishnan as Mahadev's assistant
- Robo Shankar as Inbaraj "Ink"
- Elango Kumaravel as Mathi's father
- Azhagam Perumal as Sakthi's father
- Prem as police officer
- Rishikanth as Sekhar
- Ray Paul as Sathyamoorthy's student
- KPY Surendar as sathyamoorthy's student
- Nithyaraj as Sathyamoorthy's student
- 96 Gowthamraj as Ragu, Sathyamoorthy's old student
- Raja Rani Pandian as a TV viewer
- Robo Chandru as a TV viewer
- Shrawan as a TV viewer
- Priya Rajkumar as a TV viewer
- Douglas Kumaramoorthy as a private university HR manager
- Supergood Subramani as the head master of Shakthi's school
- Mullai as Mullai, a resident of Sakthivel's area
- Kothandam as a resident of Sakthivel's area
- Rahul Thatha
- Winner Ramachandran as a stall owner
- Aswin Rao as a hacker
- Swetha Venugopal as Thendral
- Vignesh Shanmugam as a seat broker
- "Black Sheep" Ayaz as a helpline caller and in a special appearance in the song "Overa Feel Pannuren"
- "Unakennappa" Vivek as a helpline caller and in a special appearance in the song "Overa Feel Pannuren"
- Sharath Ravi as a mechanic who is also Sakthi's friend
- P. S. Mithran in a special appearance as a fake certificates dealer

== Production ==
=== Development ===
After a successful debut through Irumbu Thirai, director P. S. Mithran announced in early-2019 that he would direct a film featuring actor Sivakarthikeyan in the lead role. During the development of the film's science and education related elements, Mithran approached Let's Make Education Simple (LMES) to provide scientific input for the subject matter portrayed in the film. LMES contributed to the development and validation of film's science-related content.

=== Cast and crew ===
The crew of director Mithran's previous film, Irumbu Thirai were also retained for this film as well, including composer Yuvan Shankar Raja, editor Ruben, cinematographer George C. Williams. Additionally, Arjun, who was the main antagonist in Irumbu Thirai was added to the cast. Furthermore, later actress Kalyani Priyadarshan was announced to play the female lead alongside actress Ivana in a supporting role. The film also marks Abhay Deol's Tamil debut, and he will be playing the main villain role for the first time in his career .

=== Filming ===
The film was officially announced with its title Hero on 13 March 2019, with a formal pooja held, marking the commencement of the principal photography.

== Themes and influences ==
M. Suganth of The Times of India reviewed the film as a spiritual sequel to Gentleman (1993). Some of the scenes and inventions used in the film were actually based on real-life incidents, which includes the salt-water engine and satellites using helium filled balloon.

== Music ==
Hero

Soundtrack album by Yuvan Shankar Raja
- Released: 21 December 2019 (Singles); 9 January 2020 (Album)
- Recorded: 2019
- Genre: Feature film soundtrack
- Length: 15:20
- Language: Tamil
- Labels: Lahari Music; T-Series
- Producer: Yuvan Shankar Raja

Yuvan Shankar Raja chronology
Nerkonda Paarvai (2019)	Hero (2019)	Kalathil Santhippom (2021)

The soundtrack album is composed by Yuvan Shankar Raja, marking his second collaboration with Sivakarthikeyan and P. S. Mithran after Kedi Billa Killadi Ranga (2013) and Irumbu Thirai (2018) respectively. All the songs were released as singles, before being released as an album. The lyrics for the songs were written by Pa. Vijay, G. Rokesh and rap versions were penned by Abby Simone and MC Sanna.

All lyrics are written by Pa. Vijay, except where noted.

No.	Title	Singer(s)	Length
1.	"Malto Kithapuleh" (Lyrics written by Rokesh)	Shyam Vishwanathan	3:43
2.	"Hero Title Track" (Rap versions by Abby Simone)	Yuvan Shankar Raja, Abby Simone	4:16
3.	"Overa Feel Pannuren" (Rap versions by MC Sanna)	Yuvan Shankar Raja, MC Sanna	3:44
4.	"Aayiram Mugangal"	Ilayaraaja	3:41
Total length:			15:20

== Marketing ==
The title poster, announcing the release date of the film was launched by the makers on 27 July 2019. The first look was released on 2 September 2019, on the day of Vinayagar Chathurthi, where Sivakarthikeyan was seen holding a mask. The second look was released on 18 October 2019. Sivakarthikeyan is presented wearing mask with fire and chaos all around. The official teaser was launched by Salman Khan on 24 October 2019. The official trailer was released on 13 December 2019.

As a part of the film's promotional purposes, the makers launched a new augmented reality game experience titled Play Hero, on 23 November 2019. The latest poster of the film was launched on 28 November 2019. The production company KJR Studios, advertised the film in local trains, along with Dabangg 3, for which the distribution rights were bought by the company. The makers also launched a one-of-a-kind upscale promotion, in which the "Hero" symbol is lighted up in buildings.

On 9 December 2019, the makers launched the official merchandise of the film teaming up with BeatRoute and Fully Filmy. Later the following day, on 10 December 2019, the makers released the WhatsApp stickers of the film. On 11 December 2019, the makers launched the Augmented Reality filter for Facebook and Instagram. Theatrical trailer of the film was released on 13 December 2019, at Sathyam cinemas in Chennai, and it was later released on YouTube. The makers also announced a promotional event at M. A. Chidambaram Stadium, Chennai on 15 December 2019, coinciding with the first ODI match between India and West Indies which was also hosted in Chennai.

== Release ==
=== Theatrical ===
The film was released on 20 December 2019, clashing with Dabangg 3, which was also distributed by KJR Studios. The film released in Dubai on 19 December 2019, a day before its original release.

=== Distribution ===
The Tamil Nadu and Kerala distribution rights were acquired by the production house itself. Horizon Studio acquired the Karnataka distribution rights. The overseas rights were bought by AP International and Home Screen Entertainment.

== Reception ==
=== Box office ===
The film collected ₹1.64 crore (US$180,000) in the first weekend and ₹57.19 lakh (US$61,000) in the second weekend in Chennai. The film collected ₹3.12 crore (US$330,000) in 10 days in Chennai.

=== Critical response ===
The Times of India rated the film 3.5 out of 5, stating that "A superhero story origin, that's also a spiritual sequel to Shankar's Gentleman". For Firstpost, Sreedhar Pillai rated the 3/5, stating that "Mithran has given a neat commercial entertainer, which also calls for a rethink of our educational policy." Sify rated the film 2.5 out of 5, stating that "Hero is a must watch for families this holiday season, which has a relevant message on the modern-day educational system."

India Today rated the film 2.5 out of 5 stars, stating that "Hero had all the potential to become a proper superhero film sensible to Tamil cinema standards. But, the lumbering narrative (in a few portions), exaggerated scenes and illogical loopholes ruin the entire experience." Sudhir Srinivasan rated the film 3 out of 5 stars, stating that "Hero takes its messaging very, very seriously. The film is a scathing criticism of the good education system. It attacks colleges, pressurising parents, the spineless government, and above all, a syllabus that stifles originality and creativity, and in the words of Mahadev (Abhay Deol), "that is designed to create labourers." Moorthy (Arjun) says as much." The Indian Express rated the film 2 out of 5, stating that "Sivakarthikeyan's superpower is being super preachy."

Baradwaj Rangan for Film Companion reviewed it as "The film is surprisingly understated. It steers clear of massy "hero" moments, and there's a lot of clear, clean thinking in the writing." Haricharan Pudipeddi for Cinestaan reviewed the film as "PS Mithran's Hero is the Gentleman tribute we needed and it's a film that pretty much gets everything right."

== Potential sequel ==
During the film's audio launch in December 2019, the actor indicated there might be a sequel titled Hero 2. He said that the film could become a franchise if Hero becomes a super hit and if the director is available. These comments fuelled speculation early on that the film would develop into a franchise.

== Controversies ==
Prior to the film's release, aspiring filmmaker Bosco Prabhu reported Mithran to South Indian Film Writers Association, accusing him of plagiarising his script registered with the association in 2017 and making it into Hero. After a scrutiny with 18 EC members, film director K. Bhagyaraj, who is the head of the association, pointed out the plots of Hero and Bosco's scripts were both the same. Mithran denied any plagiarism, claiming the film had a different plot. Post the association's decision, Bhagyaraj sent Mithran a letter telling him to compensate and give Bosco credits for Hero's story. When Mithran did not respond and went ahead with the film's release, Bhagyaraj insisted Bosco to go to court, assuring him of the association's support.

Feeling the members of the association compared the core plots instead of screenplay, Mithran stated that the film's story was incorporated from many stories found in newspaper articles and real-life incidents. He also wrote back to the president of the Writers' Association, denying any plagiarism of Bosco's script, and requesting them to compare and reviews both scripts before reaching a conclusion. In 2020, months after the film started streaming on Amazon Prime Video, the court gave a judgement in favour of Prabhu and issued an interim order that resulted in the film being banned from television airings and getting taken down from Prime Video. In May 2020, the case was resolved and the film was reinstated on Prime Video.
