= Karthi =

Indian actor (born 1977)

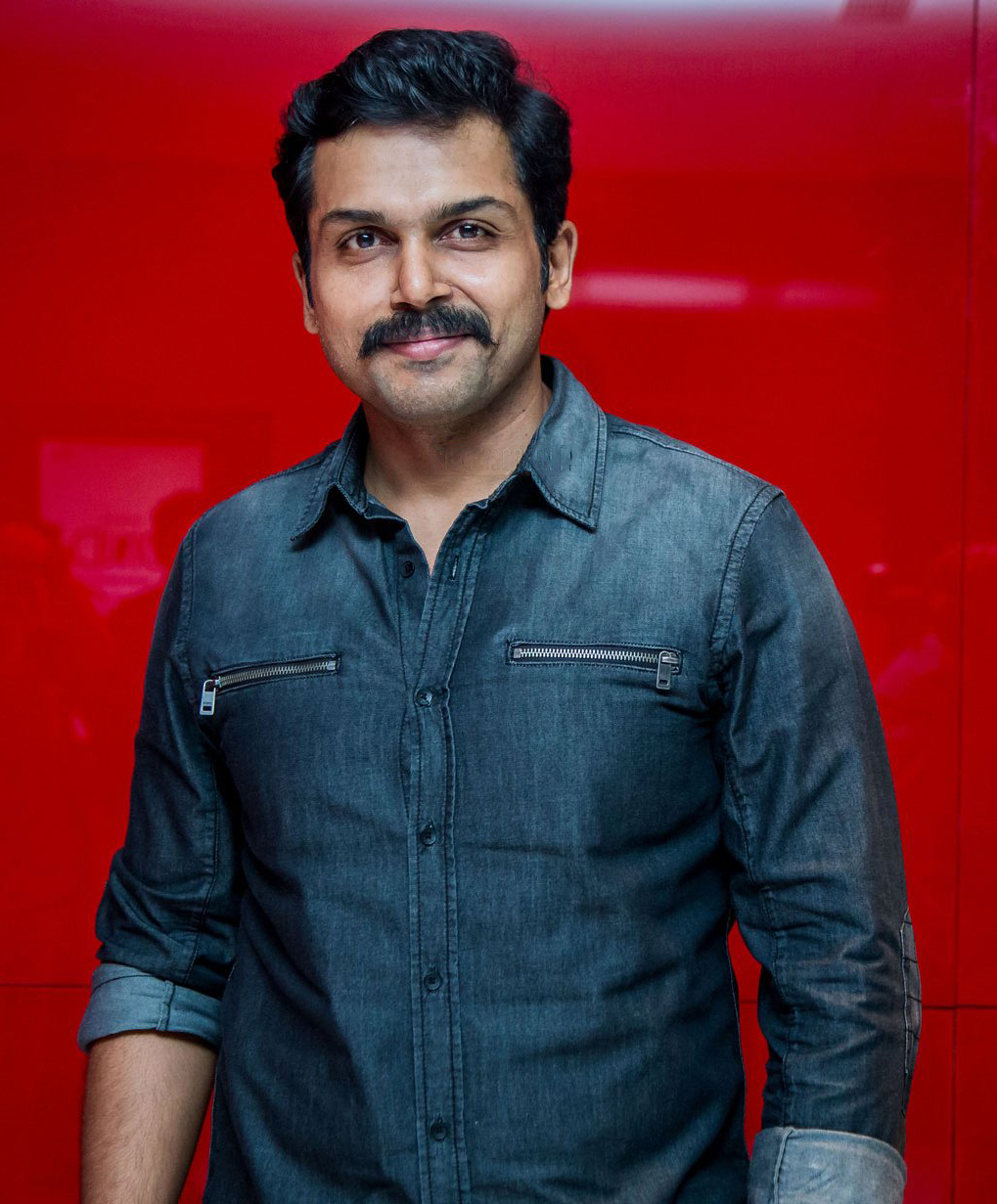
- Karthi in 2017
- Born: Karthik Sivakumar; 25 May 1977 (age 49); Madras, Tamil Nadu, India
- Education: Crescent Engineering College (B.Tech Mechanical Engineering); Binghamton University
- Occupations: Actor; Playback singer
- Years active: 2004–present
- Spouse: Ranjani Chinnasamy (m. 2011)
- Children: 2
- Father: Sivakumar
- Relatives: Suriya Sivakumar (brother); Brindha (sister); Jyothika Suriya (sister-in-law)

Karthik Sivakumar (born 25 May 1977), known professionally as Karthi, is an Indian actor who works in Tamil cinema. He is the son of veteran actor Sivakumar, and began his career as an assistant director in his elder brother Suriya's film Aayutha Ezhuthu (2004). He debuted as a lead actor with Paruthiveeran (2007). Karthi is a recipient of four Filmfare Awards South and three Tamil Nadu State Film Awards.

After a three-year hiatus from acting, he then returned to star in films such as Aayirathil Orvuan, Paiyaa and Naan Mahaan Alla, all three of which were released in 2010. He then continued to star in films such as Siruthai (2011), Saguni (2012), Alex Pandian (2013), All In All Azhagu Raja (2013) and Biriyani (2013).

Karthi has starred in several well-known Indian films, portraying an impulsive and short-tempered working-class man in Madras (2014), a paroled convict-turned-caretaker in bilingual comedy-drama film Oopiri / Thozha, and in dual roles as the titular protagonist and the antagonist in Kaashmora (both in 2016).He starred as the titular character in Theeran Adhigaaram Ondru (2017), for which he received the Filmfare Award South for Best Actor – Tamil and the Tamil Nadu State Film Award for Best Actor, as Dilli in Kaithi (2019), as Vallavaraiyan Vandiyadevan in Ponniyin Selvan: I (2022) and its sequel (2023), and also starred in the spy-thriller film Sardar (2022).

== Early life ==
Karthi was born as Karthik Sivakumar on 25 May 1977 in Madras (now Chennai), Tamil Nadu, India to actor Sivakumar and his wife Lakshmi. He has two siblings; an elder brother, Suriya, who was already an established actor at the time of Karthi's film debut, and a younger sister, Brindha, who is a singer in Tamil cinema. Tamil film actress Jyothika is Karthi's sister-in-law.

He completed his elementary and secondary school education at Padma Seshadri Bala Bhavan and St. Bede's Anglo Indian Higher Secondary School, Chennai. He gained a bachelor's degree in mechanical engineering from Crescent Engineering College, Chennai. After graduation, he worked as an Engineering consultant in Chennai and considered higher studies abroad. "I was earning about ₹ 5000 per month and found the work monotonous. That was when I thought, I should do something more", he recalled in an interview. Karthi got a scholarship for his higher studies in the United States, and enrolled at Binghamton University, New York, where he earned his Master of Science in industrial engineering. While pursuing his master's degree, he also took elective courses on filmmaking. During his stay in New York, Karthi worked as a part-time graphic designer. He then decided to pursue a career in filmmaking; he attended two courses in basic filmmaking at State University of New York. He stated: "I always knew I wanted to be in films, but I did not know exactly what I wanted to do. I loved movies and watched a lot of them. But my father insisted that I get a good education before I joined the film industry".

== Acting career ==
=== 2004–2007; Debut success ===
When Karthi returned to Chennai, he met director Mani Ratnam and got a chance to work as an assistant director in Aayutha Ezhuthu, because he wanted to become a film director and preferred directing to acting, though he did appear in Aayutha Ezhuthu. He continued to receive acting offers and his father convinced him to take up acting, telling him that "one can always direct films, but one will not get a chance to act once you grow older". When director Ameer approached him to play the titular character in the film Paruthiveeran, he accepted the offer because the film was "so compelling". It was released in January 2007, to critical acclaim and became commercially successful.

Critics unanimously praised Karthi's portrayal of a careless village ruffian. Sify said: "It's hard to believe that it is Karthi's debut film as he is just spectacular. His expressions, anger, laughter and anguish are all so realistic that you can feel the fire in him." Rediff called his performance "excellent", and "one of the top performances of 2007". Karthi received several accolades for his performance, including the Filmfare Award for Best Actor in Tamil.

In October 2006, Karthi signed his second project under Selvaraghavan's direction, Idhu Maalai Nerathu Mayakkam, which was supposed to be a romance film, featuring Sandhya as the female lead. Karthi's character was a "sophisticated upmarket stylish guy". Selvaraghavan abandoned that project.

=== 2008–2011: Break after Paruthiveeran ===
He announced the production of an action-adventure film titled Aayirathil Oruvan, with Karthi in the lead role. Filming began later that year and was expected to be completed by February 2008. The producers planned to release it in mid-2008, but production was delayed and filming continued until early 2009. He had agreed to play the lead character in Linguswamy's next film Paiyaa but was postponed several times. He later said that he became anxious because he received several film offers, but could not work on them because he needed to maintain the continuity of his looks. During the filming of Aayirathil Oruvan, producer R.Ravindran complained that Karthi was trying to change his look and move on to Paiyaa before finishing his commitments.

Aayirathil Oruvan was released in early 2010. Karthi's portrayal of a chief coolie was often compared to that in his debut film. Sify called Karthi's performance "a scream" and said: "Right from his introduction scene till the end, he is lovable and provides humour", and that he had "made a sensational comeback".

In April 2010, Linguswamy's Paiyaa released. A romantic road-trip film, featuring an album by Yuvan Shankar Raja, it was very successful. For the first time, he enacted a character that lives in an urban area. He said that he accepted the film because he desperately wanted to play a cool dude on screen.

Karthi's third film in 2010 was Suseenthiran's action thriller Naan Mahaan Alla. Karthi's performances was praised by critics. Sreedhar Pillai wrote for Sify: "[Karthi] nails the character to perfection ... He is one good reason to see the film." Bhama Devi Ravi of Times of India wrote: "what a pleasure to see Karthi deliver his best performance to date". Rediff wrote that "Karthi has simply had a ball ... It's been a long time since you saw an actor who can be as convincing in sadness and rage, as in happiness." Naan Mahaan Alla was dubbed into Telugu and released as Naa Peru Shiva in 2011; it was very successful and earned Karthi some Telugu film offers.

Karthi's next film was the action–masala Siruthai (2011), a remake of the 2006 Telugu film Vikramarkudu. Karthi's performances received favourable reviews. Malathi Rangarajan of The Hindu wrote: "Karthi looks and performs better with every film. Siruthai exemplifies the observation". Pavithra Srinivasan of Rediff wrote: "But the film belongs to Rocket Raja (Karthi), the sort of adorable ruffian Tamil cinema has been missing for a while. He picks pockets, slices off handbags, charms women and even bashes (!) them up without a single jolt to his conscience." Despite gaining mixed critical response, the film achieved financial success, becoming one of the highest-grossing Tamil films of 2011. In 2011, Siruthai became Karthi's biggest commercial success, cementing his position in the Tamil film industry. Sify said that Karthi had become "one of the hottest stars in Kollywood". He made a special appearance in a song in K. V. Anand's Ko (2011), alongside other prominent actors from Tamil cinema (Incl. his brother Suriya).

=== 2012–present: Career slump and resurgence ===
In May 2011, Karthi began working in the political comedy film Saguni, directed by Shankar Dayal and featuring him amongst an ensemble cast of supporting actors. He played Kamalakannan in the film, a villager who comes to the city to save his palatial house in Karaikudi from being destroyed for a politician's personal gain and unknowingly transforms to become a kingmaker in Tamil Nadu politics. The film opened to mixed reviews from critics, and became a box office failure. Karthi dubbed for himself for the Telugu version of Saguni (2012) and has since dubbed for the Telugu dubbed versions of all of his films and for one character in Brothers, the dubbed version of his brother Suriya's Maattrraan (2012). He later appeared in the 2013 Pongal release Alex Pandian, opposite Anushka Shetty, which also opened to negative critical response upon release.

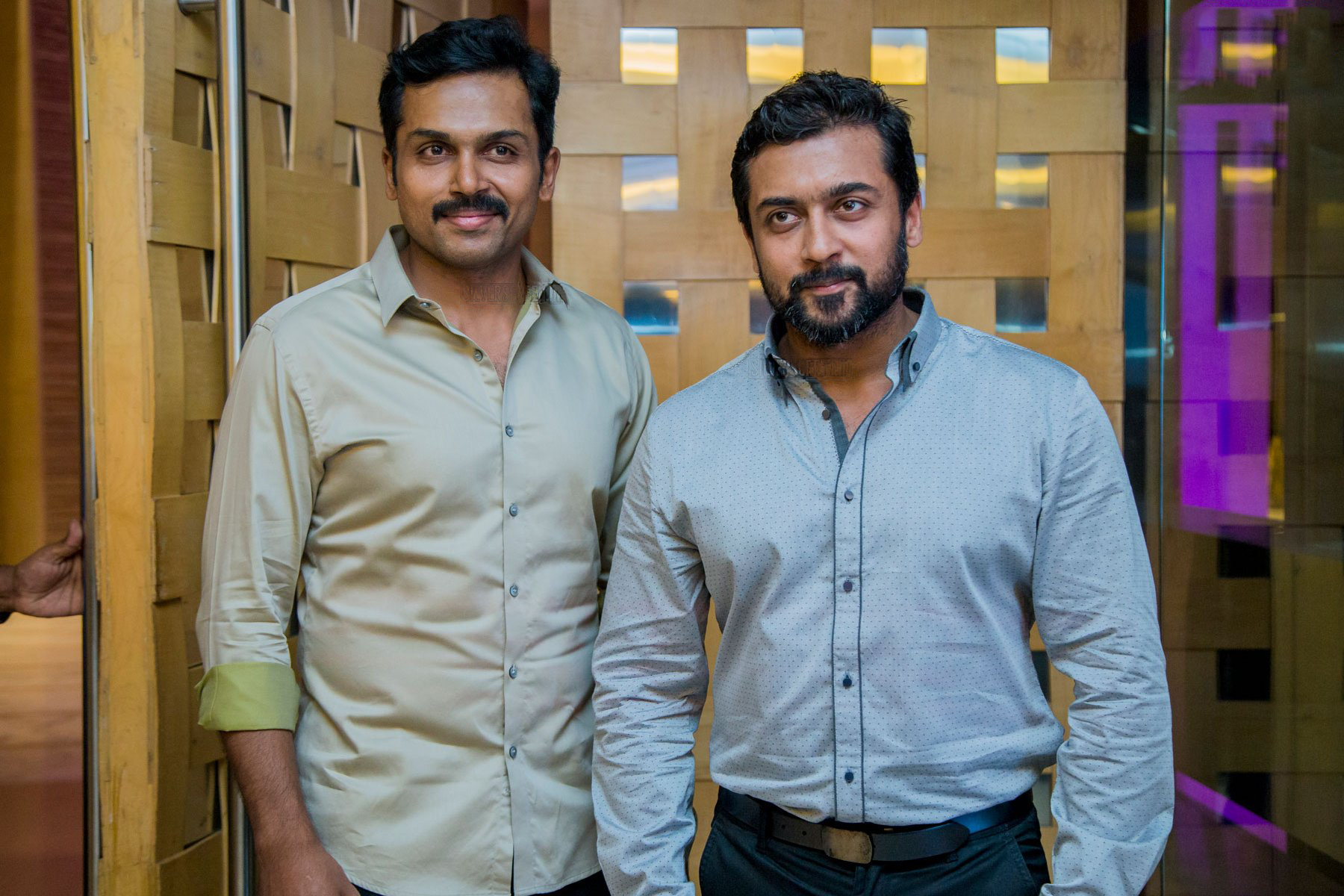
Karthi and Suriya at the launch of Knack Studio

Karthi's next release was Rajesh M's All in All Azhagu Raja, which featured him opposite Kajal Aggarwal and Santhanam. The film was released on Diwali 2013, and received unfavorable reviews and struggled at the box office. He also sang the song "Mississippi" under Yuvan Shankar Raja's direction. In 2014, Karthi appeared in Pa. Ranjith's Madras, a critical and commercial success. His next release was the 2015 action drama Komban. His first release in 2016 was the Telugu-Tamil bilingual film Oopiri / Thozha. The film received positive reviews. Karthi's performance was praised, with Baradwaj Rangan of The Hindu stating (in his review of the Tamil version Thozha), "At a time every leading man (including Karthi) seems to be participating in a game-show titled Who Wants To Be The Next Rajinikanth?, here's a simple 'buddy movie' (in the Hollywoodian sense), with no punch dialogues, no action sequences, with just one duet (with Tamannaah, who plays Vikram's secretary; her romance with Seenu is strangely unresolved). We see, all the time, character actors striving to become larger-than-life heroes. For a change, here's a hero scaling himself down to play a life-sized character." Later that year, Karthi appeared in director Gokul's Kaashmora. Though the film received mixed reviews, his performance was praised.

Karthi's Kaatru Veliyidai (2017), was directed and produced by Mani Ratnam. The film met with mixed reviews and became a failure. Karthi's Theeran Adhigaaram Ondru (2017) was directed by H. Vinoth and produced by Dream Warrior Pictures. It received critical acclaim and Karthi received a Filmfare Award South for the Best Actor – Critics for his performance. The film became a huge success at the box office. Right after Theeran Karthi acted in Kadaikutty Singam portrayed the role of a farmer directed by Pandiraj which has been produced by this brother Suriya which has gained the highest footfalls in the year 2018 in Tamil Nadu. His next film was Dev, produced by Lakshman Kumar, under Prince Pictures, directed by debutante director, Rajath Ravishankar, music composed by Harris Jayaraj, and cinematography by R. Velraj. Upon release, it received negative reviews from both the critics and audience, alike. It was a huge commercial failure.

His next release in the same year, Kaithi (2019), was a blockbuster hit and collected more than ₹100 crores at the box office. It became the highest-grossing film of his career. He was next seen in Sulthan, directed by Bakkiyaraj Kannan, of Remo fame. It starred Rashmika Mandanna alongside him. It opened to mixed reviews from both the critics and audience, alike. It became a decent box-office success.

Next, he was seen in the rural family drama, Viruman (2022), directed by M. Muthaiah, his second collaboration with him after Komban. It too turned out to became commercially successful. Post Viruman, he was seen in the magnum opuses, Ponniyin Selvan: I (2022) and Ponniyin Selvan: II (2023), directed by Mani Ratnam. He essayed Vallavaraiyan Vandiyadevan in the films, in which his performances received several accolades. In between the two films, he also played a dual role, as a father and son in Sardar, which released in 2022. It opened to generally positive reviews from both the critics and audience, alike. Later in 2023, Karthi have his second release of the year with Japan. Next, he co-starred with Arvind Swamy in the drama film, Meiyazhagan (2024) which receives positive reviews. In 2026, he appeared in the action comedy film, Vaa Vaathiyaar.

== Personal life ==
On 3 July 2011, Karthi married Ranjani Chinnasamy, (Note: Some sources reported her name as Ranjini and the patronymic name as Chinnaswamy.) who graduated with a master's degree in English literature from Stella Maris College, Chennai. They were engaged on 29 April 2011 at Ranjani's native village, Goundampalayam in Erode district, and the wedding was held in a traditional Kongu culture at the CODISSIA Trade Fair Complex in Coimbatore. The wedding was arranged by the elders of the family. They have two children, a daughter and a son.

== Other work ==
Karthi has been involved in several charities and social service activities. On his 31st birthday, he inaugurated the Makkal Nala Mandram, in order to encourage his fans to become involved in welfare activities. During the event, Karthi donated blood, donated bicycles to handicapped people, sewing machines to women and schoolbags to children. He presented a cheque of ₹ 50,000 to YR Gaitonde Centre for AIDS Research and Education, which helps AIDS affected children. In 2011, Karthi became a cause ambassador for promoting awareness of lysosomal storage disease. He had also adopted a white tiger cub at Vandalur Zoo to protect and preserve the animal. On his birthdays, Karthi visits orphanages and donates funds to them.

In September 2010, Karthi signed a contract with Bharti Airtel to become its brand ambassador in South India and appear in its "Indraikku enna plan" advertising campaign. He has also appeared in advertisements for Bru Instant Coffee along with Kajal Aggarwal, who had earlier acted opposite him in Naan Mahaan Alla and All in All Azhagu Raja.

In 2015, Karthi joined fellow actors Vishal, Nassar, Karunas and Ponvannan to campaign against the concurrent office bearers of the Nadigar Sangam, led by R. Sarathkumar and Radha Ravi.

== Filmography ==
Key
†	Denotes films that have not yet been released

- All films are Tamil unless otherwise noted.

List of Karthi film credits
Year	Film	Role	Notes
2004	Aayutha Ezhuthu	Michael's friend	Uncredited role; also assistant director
2007	Paruthiveeran	Paruthiveeran	Won—Filmfare Award for Best Actor – Tamil; Won—Tamil Nadu State Film Special Prize; Won—Vijay Award for Best Male Debut
2010	Aayirathil Oruvan	Muthu	Nominated—Filmfare Award for Best Actor – Tamil
2010	Paiyaa	Shiva	Nominated—Filmfare Award for Best Actor – Tamil
2010	Naan Mahaan Alla	Jeeva Prakasam	Nominated—Vijay Award for Best Actor
2011	Siruthai	DSP Rathnavel Pandian and Rocket Raja (Note: Karthi played two characters.)	
2011	Ko	Himself	Guest appearance in song "Aga Naga"
2012	Saguni	Kamalakannan	
2013	Alex Pandian	Alex Pandian	
2013	All in All Azhagu Raja	Azhagu Raja and Young Muthukrishnan	
2013	Biriyani	Sugan	
2014	Madras	Kaali	Won—Filmfare Critics Award for Best Actor – Tamil; Won—SIIMA Critics Award for Best Actor
2014	Madras	Kaali	Nominated—Filmfare Award for Best Actor – Tamil; Nominated—Vijay Award for Best Actor
2015	Komban	Kombaiah Pandian (Komban)	
2016	Oopiri/Thozha	Seenu	Nominated—Filmfare Award for Best Actor – Telugu
2016	Kaashmora	Kaashmora and Raj Nayak	
2017	Kaatru Veliyidai	Varun Chakrapani (VC)	
2017	Theeran Adhigaaram Ondru	DSP Theeran Thirumaran	Won—Filmfare Critics Award for Best Actor – Tamil; Won- Tamil Nadu State Film Award for Best Actor; Won—Edison Award for Best Actor
2018	Kadaikutty Singam	Perunazhi Gunasingam (Kadaikutty Singam)	Nominated—SIIMA Award for Best Actor in a Leading Role
2019	Dev	Dev Ramalingam	
2019	Kaithi	Dilli	Won—Tamil Nadu State Film Award Special Prize; Won-Norway Tamil Film Festival Award for Best Actor
2019	Thambi	Saravanan (Vicky) (Note: His character previously used several pseudonyms including Guru, Arjun, and Michael.)	
2021	Sulthan	Vikram (Sulthan)	
2022	Viruman	Viruman	
2022	Ponniyin Selvan: I	Vallavaraiyan Vandiyadevan	Nominated—Filmfare Award for Best Actor – Tamil
2022	Sardar	Inspector Vijayaprakash and Chandra Bose "Sardar"	
2023	Ponniyin Selvan: II	Vallavaraiyan Vandiyadevan	
2023	Japan	Japan Muni	25th Film
2024	Meiyazhagan	Meiyazhagan	Won- Filmfare Award for Best Supporting Actor - Tamil; Won—SIIMA Critics Award for Best Actor
2024	Kanguva	Rathaangasan and Commander Ryan	Cameo
2025	HIT: The Third Case	ACP Veerappan IPS	Cameo
2026	Vaa Vaathiyaar	Inspector Rameshwaran / MGR (Note: Karthi played one character, which had an alter ego.)	
2026	Sardar 2	Agent Vijay Prakash "Code Red" and Chandra Bose "Sardar"	
2027	Karthi30 †	TBA	Filming
2027	Karthi31 †	TBA	Pre-Production
2028	HIT: The Fourth Case †	ACP Veerappan IPS	Pre-Production
TBA	Marshal †	TBA	Delayed

=== As voice actor ===
List of Karthi voice credits
Year	Film	Role
2012	Maattrraan	Dubbed for Vimal (Suriya) in Telugu dubbed version
2022	Vikram	Dilli
2023	Mark Antony	Narrator
2025	3BHK	Narrator

== Discography ==
List of songs sung by Karthi
Year	Film	Song	Language	Composer	Notes
2007	Paruthiveeran	"Oororam Puliyamaram"	Tamil	Yuvan Shankar Raja	
2012	Saguni	"Kandha Kaara Vadai"	Tamil	G. V. Prakash Kumar	
2013	Biriyani	"Mississippi"	Tamil	Yuvan Shankar Raja	
2013	Biriyani	"Mississippi"	Telugu	Yuvan Shankar Raja	Dubbed version
2017	Magalir Mattum	"Gubu Gubu Gubu"	Tamil	Ghibran	
2018	Party	"Cha Cha Chare"	Tamil	Premgi Amaren	Unreleased film
2022	Oke Oka Jeevitham	"Maaripoye"	Telugu	Jakes Bejoy	
2022	Kanam	"Maaripocho"	Tamil	Jakes Bejoy	
2022	Sardar	"Yerumayileri"	Tamil	G. V. Prakash Kumar	
2023	Japan	"Touching Touching"	Tamil	G. V. Prakash Kumar	
2023	Japan	"Touching Touching"	Telugu	G. V. Prakash Kumar	Dubbed version
