= George C. Williams (cinematographer) =

Indian cinematographer

- Born: Chennai, India
- Occupation: Cinematographer

George C. Williams is an Indian cinematographer, who works in the Tamil, Telugu and Malayalam film industry.

== Career ==
As a youngster, George C. Williams revealed he had a passion for keeping track of lighting, camera angles and framing in Tamil films, often observing the work of P. C. Sreeram, Santhosh Sivan and Jeeva during his school days. He subsequently pursued a degree in Visual Communication from Madras Christian College, learning more about the art of cinematography. In college, he got to know Atlee Kumar, whom he then worked with in Raja Rani (2013) and Theri (2016).

George gained entry into films through a family friend, the choreographer Kalyan, who introduced him to cinematographer Nirav Shah to join as an assistant. He subsequently first helped out as a second unit cameraman in Billa (2007) and then in Sarvam (2009). He subsequently also worked with Arjun Jena for the Telugu film Ala Modalaindi (2011), revealing his early stint helped him get used to the technology involved. Another early assignment he was given was the video of "Nenjodu Cherthu" from the music album Yuvvh (2012), directed by Alphonse Putharen and his work in the project won him rave reviews from the Malayali audience. He was subsequently signed by A. R. Murugadoss to be the main cinematographer for his production, Atlee's Raja Rani (2013) and then Kaththi (2014). The success of both films, catapulted George into among the leading cinematographers in Tamil films. He subsequently signed projects in Malayalam and Telugu cinema.

== Filmography ==
=== As cinematographer ===
| Year | Film | Language | Notes |
|---|---|---|---|
| 2011 | Mugaputhagam | Tamil | Short film |
| 2013 | Raja Rani | Tamil | |
| 2014 | Kaththi | Tamil | |
| 2015 | Naanum Rowdy Dhaan | Tamil | |
| 2016 | Theri | Tamil | |
| 2017 | Sakhavu | Malayalam | |
| 2018 | Tholi Prema | Telugu | |
| 2018 | Irumbu Thirai | Tamil | |
| 2019 | Mr. Majnu | Telugu | |
| 2019 | Hero | Tamil | |
| 2019 | Fingertip | Tamil | Web series on ZEE5 Platform |
| 2022 | Ghani | Telugu | |
| 2022 | Sardar | Tamil | |
| 2026 | Vaa Vaathiyaar | Tamil | |
| 2026 | Parimala and Co | Tamil | |
| 2026 | Sardar 2 | Tamil | |

=== As guest cinematographer ===
| Year | Film | Language | Notes |
|---|---|---|---|
| 2023 | Das Ka Dhamki | Telugu | 1 song only: "O Dollar Pillagaa" |
| 2023 | Agent | Telugu | 1 song only: "Rama Krishna Govinda" |
| 2025 | Andhra King Taluka | Telugu | Additional cinematography |

== Awards and nominations ==
| Year | Award | Category | Film | Result | Ref. |
|---|---|---|---|---|---|
| 2014 | 8th Vijay Awards | Best Cinematographer | Raja Rani | Nominated | |
| 2019 | 8th South Indian International Movie Awards | Best Cinematographer (Telugu) | Tholi Prema | Nominated | |
