= Siruthai =

2011 film by Siva

- Theatrical release poster
- Directed by: Siva
- Written by: Siva; T. Senthil Kumaran; M. Chandran (dialogues)
- Screenplay by: Siva
- Story by: V. Vijayendra Prasad
- Based on: Vikramarkudu by S. S. Rajamouli
- Produced by: K. E. Gnanavel Raja; S. R. Prakash Babu; S. R. Prabhu
- Starring: Karthi; Tamannaah Bhatia; Santhanam
- Cinematography: R. Velraj
- Edited by: V. T. Vijayan
- Music by: Vidyasagar
- Production company: Studio Green
- Distributed by: Studio Green
- Release date: 14 January 2011
- Running time: 160 minutes
- Country: India
- Language: Tamil
- Budget: ₹11–13 crore
- Box office: ₹30 crore

Siruthai (transl. Leopard) is a 2011 Indian Tamil-language action comedy film directed by Siva, who is also one of its co-writers. It is a remake of the 2006 Telugu film Vikramarkudu, directed by S. S. Rajamouli. It stars Karthi playing dual roles, alongside Tamannaah Bhatia and comedian Santhanam. The film was produced by K. E. Gnanavelraja and features music by Vidyasagar. The story revolves around "Rocket" Raja, a petty thief who comes across a little girl says that he's her father. When he learns the truth about his lookalike Rathnavel Pandian, who's an honest cop, he decides to turn a new leaf and help get rid of a crime gang.

It was released during Pongal on 14 January 2011. Generally the film got positive responses, and was a blockbuster success at the box office. The success of the film led to the director Siva being known as "Siruthai Siva" from then on.

== Plot ==
The film starts with Bhavuji, a ruthless rowdy, receiving a call that IPS officer, Rathnavel Pandian is still alive, where everyone believed that he was killed by Bhavuji's younger brother, Badhra. Bhavuji and his henchmen went to Rathnavel's grave to exhume his body to which they found a coffin of heavy rocks, which meant that Rathnavel was still alive and Bhavuji is desperate to know his current location.

Meanwhile, Rocket Raja and his friend Kaatupoochi are small-time criminals who steals expensive items and cons people into giving them money. Kaatupoochi receives a call that a very rich person is having a wedding near their area, which Raja and Kaatupoochi go there to steal. In the wedding, Raja meets Swetha and immediately is attracted to her, which she also reciprocates. To keep her close, he lies that he works at a big office and has to perform many crimes to keep this facade going. They both begin to be in a relationship.

One day, Raja and Kaatupoochi saw a lady with a big wooden box arriving in the railway station. She told her transporter that the box is full of gold and jewels which brought the attention of Raja and Kaatupoochi. They offered to look after the box as per the lady's request with the intention of stealing the box and with the jewelries inside it. However, both of them found a little girl in the box. To their added shock, the little girl addresses Raja as her father, which made Raja very confused.

A few days later, Kaatupoochi found a photo of the little girl's real father, which turns out to be Rathnavel Pandian, who looks exactly like Raja. Raja is even more puzzled. Elsewhere, Bhavuji has sent his henchmen to look for Rathnavel Pandian. One day, Raja and the little girl was ambushed and attacked by Bhavuji's henchmen until Rathnavel Pandian arrives and along with his police comrades, killed all the henchmen. However, Rathnavel was severely injured and was hospitalised. Rathnavel's police comrade then tells Raja who Rathnavel Pandian was.

In a flashback, Rathnavel Pandian is assigned to Devipattinam, where he arrives with his motherless daughter, Divya. He is introduced to his colleagues, including officer Bharath. The town suffers under the tyranny of a ruthless don, Bhavuji, who engages in corruption, extortion, and numerous illegal activities. Bhavuji’s son, Munna, kidnaps and rapes a police officer’s wife, prompting Rathnavel to intervene. He arrests Munna, unaware of Bhavuji's vast political influence.

The corrupt Home Minister and the DGP, bowing to political pressure, force Rathnavel to release Munna, declaring him mentally unstable. At a celebratory party for Munna’s release, Rathnavel tricks him into accidentally hanging himself with a belt, leading to his death. Furious, Bhavuji seeks revenge. On Holi, Bhavuji’s brother Bhadra hiding beneath an idol stabs Rathnavel before shooting him. Though presumed dead, he survives with a brain injury. The villagers secretly protect him and send him to Chennai for treatment. To keep Divya from knowing the truth, the police officials decide to leave her in the care of Raja, who resembles Rathnavel.

In the present, Rathnavel Pandian succumbs to his injuries. To avenge his death, Raja impersonates him and returns to Devipattinam, setting his sights on Bhavuji. Bhavuji is shocked to see "Rathnavel" alive and Raja destroys everything that belonged to Bhavuji. Swetha then finds Raja, but Raja did not want to blow his cover as Rathnavel Pandian. Swetha exposed Raja's identity by showing her navel and hips, which was Raja's weakness. In the end, Raja and Bhavuji and Badhra ensue in a dramatic final fight which the both latter was killed by Raja.

== Cast ==
- Karthi in a dual role as
  - Rocket Raja, a skilled pickpocket
  - DSP Rathnavel Pandian, an honest and courageous police officer
- Tamannaah Bhatia (voice: Savitha) as Swetha, Raja's love interest
- Santhanam as Kaatu Poochi, Raja's friend
- Baby Rakshana as Divya Rathinavel Pandian, Ratnavel's daughter
- Avinash as Bavuji, a don of Devipattinam
- Rajeev Kanakala as Inspector Bharath
- Amit Tiwari as Munna, Bavuji's son
- Supreeth as Bhadra, Bavuji's brother
- Manobala as Bhoom Bhoom, Bavuji's accountant
- Meera Krishnan as Swetha's mother
- Santhana Bharathi as Home Minister
- Mayilsamy as Toilet Patron (IT Office)
- Meghna Nair as Inspector Jhansi
- Bhanu Chander as DGP
- Vinayakan as Bavuji's henchman
- Nellai Siva as Doctor
- Master Bharath as Wedding guest
- Kadhal Saravanan as Wedding guest
- Fish Venkat as Bavuji's henchman
- Seenu as Bavuji's henchman
- Raghu as Acid Raja, Bavuji's henchman

Cameo appearance

- Meghna Naidu in the song "Azhaga Poranthuputta"
- Bhumika Chawla as Rathnavel Pandian's wife (uncredited photo appearance)

== Music ==
Siruthai

Soundtrack album by Vidyasagar
- Released: 20 December 2010
- Recorded: Varsha Vallaki Studios
- Genre: Film soundtrack
- Language: Tamil
- Label: Venus Records & Tapes
- Producer: Vidyasagar

Vidyasagar chronology
Ilaignan (2011)	Siruthai (2010)	Kaavalan (2011)

The soundtrack was composed by Vidyasagar. It was described as "bland" by Rediff.com, while Sify called it "catchy and youthful".

No.	Title	Lyrics	Performer(s)	Length
1.	"Naan Romba Romba"	Na. Muthukumar	Ranjith
2.	"Chellam Vada Chellam"	Na. Muthukumar	Udit Narayan, Roshan, Surmukhi Raman
3.	"Azhagha Poranthuputa"	Viveka	Priyadharshini, Malathy Lakshman
4.	"Thalattu"	Arivumathi	Srivardhini Thaman
5.	"Adi Rakkamma Rakku"	Pa. Vijay	Ranjith, Suchitra, Roshan

== Reception ==
Sify claimed that Siruthai had "come out as a festival bonanza for Tamil film goers. It is an unpretentious commercial pot boiler with ample doses of romance, comedy, action and emotion". N. Venkateswaran from The Times of India deemed a score of 2.5/5, citing that it "does not do anything for Karthi as an actor; what it does is to cement his position in the Tamil film industry as an actor who is a big draw at the box office". Malathi Rangarajan from The Hindu noted: "Generally, well-told cop stories don't bite the dust. Nor do dual role bonanzas. Going by the norm, this Siruthai should charge ahead!"
