= Irumbu Thirai (2018 film) =

- Theatrical release poster
- Directed by: P. S. Mithran
- Written by: P. S. Mithran; Pon Parthiban; Savari Muthu; Antony Bhagyaraj
- Produced by: Vishal
- Starring: Vishal; Arjun; Samantha
- Cinematography: George C. Williams
- Edited by: Ruben
- Music by: Yuvan Shankar Raja
- Production company: Vishal Film Factory
- Distributed by: Lyca Productions; Krikes Cine Creations
- Release date: 11 May 2018
- Running time: 160 minutes
- Country: India
- Language: Tamil
- Box office: ₹61 crore

Irumbu Thirai (transl. Iron Curtain) is a 2018 Indian Tamil-language action techno-thriller film directed by debutant P. S. Mithran. The film stars Vishal, Arjun, and Samantha Ruth Prabhu, with Yuvan Shankar Raja composing the soundtrack. The film was produced by Vishal Film Factory, and the venture began production in October 2016. The narrative centers around an army officer, who starts hunting down a gang of hackers after they steal money from his bank account.

The film released worldwide on 11 May 2018 and received positive reviews from critics and audience praising the cast performances(particularly Vishal and Arjun), writing, direction, action sequences and technical aspects. The film successfully completed 100-days at the box office and became the seventh-highest grossing Tamil film of 2018. Chakra, released in 2021, is unofficially considered to be a standalone sequel.

== Plot ==
Indian Army Major Kathiravan is working on anger management issues under chief psychiatrist Rathi Devi to return to his job. Soon they both fall in love and she counsels him to leave for his village to spend time with his father Rangaswamy and sister. Though having hated his father due to his habit of borrowing money, Kathiravan reluctantly agrees. Kathiravan finds that his sister's fiancé Kesavan's family demands them to bear the marriage expenses. He realizes his mistake of abandoning his family and promises to fulfill his sister's wish. Kathiravan returns to Chennai to apply for a loan, only to get rejected everywhere. With the advice of his uncle, he takes his father to Chennai along with him and tries to get a loan in Rangaswamy's name but is also rejected everywhere due to financial security.

They are approached by a person, who claims to be a loan agent and tells them to forge documents to get a loan for a commission. Kathiravan initially refuses, but reluctantly agrees to the man's offer and submits all the original documents to him. The person helps them to obtain a loan of ₹6 lakh (US$6,200). Kathiravan is overjoyed and starts the marriage preparation. Later on, when Rangaswamy is unable to withdraw money due to insufficient balance, he informs Kathiravan, who in turn is surprised by the missing funds. Kathiravan enquires the bank but to no avail. He becomes frustrated and scolds Rangaswamy. Unable to bear the words, Rangaswamy attempts suicide. In the hospital, Kathiravan learns that Rangaswamy took debts to extend Kathiravan's sick mother's life. He feels remorseful after hearing this and reconciles with Rangaswamy.

On Rathi's advice and with the help of his friends in the military, he decides to track down the person responsible for the theft. Kathiravan manages to apprehend and chase a loan agent similar to his loan agent to extradite information. Later, he gets a phone call from a private number who tells Kathiravan to release him as he knows all the details about him and even threatens to release the private files in his sister's phone on the net. This shocks Kathiravan, who leaves the agent, but the agent is fatally hit by a van. The mysterious person is later revealed to be Sathyamoorthy, a.k.a. White Devil, who is the kingpin of the Dark Net by the use of the Y2k Problem. He runs an educational trust as a front for his cybercrime network. Kathiravan tracks and confronts Sathyamoorthy where the latter reveals his knowledge of the former following him and tells him that he attacked his sister.

Sathyamoorthy also tells Kathiravan that he put ₹10 lakh (US$10,000) to his account from a flagged account for which he is court-martialed. However, Kathiravan tracks Sathyamoorthy's henchmen with Rathi's help to his henchmen's base, where he retrieves a laptop that they used to hack people's accounts. He frames Satyamoorthy by stealing the money of all police officers of Chennai City Police. He confronts Sathyamoorthy at the server farm, where the two engage in hand-to-hand combat. Sathyamoorthy defeats Kathiravan and burns the money due to his god complex. However, Kathiravan reveals that the burnt money belongs to the Telecom minister, whom he blackmailed into passing information about the Aadhaar card information of all the citizens of India. All the people, along with the policemen, who were conned by Sathyamoorthy learn about him from Kathiravan, and they reach the docks. Kathiravan fights back and defeats Sathyamoorthy, after which Kathiravan reveals that he had hacked Satyamoorthy’s account and stole all of the money, and tells him to face the consequences. He opens the door, as an angry mob enters and assaults Satyamoorthy. Later, Kathiravan transfers their money back to their respective accounts. Sathyamoorthy is arrested by the police but creates a new username named Dark Angel.

== Cast ==
- Vishal as Major Kathiravan Rangasamy (Kathir)
- Arjun as Sathyamoorthy / White Devil
- Samantha Ruth Prabhu as Dr. Rathi Devi (Voice dubbed by Chinmayi)
- Delhi Ganesh as Rangasamy, Kathir's father
- Sreeja Ravi as Kathir's mother
- Robo Shankar as Kathir's uncle
- Darshana Rajendran as Selvi, Kathir's sister
- Aadukalam Naren as Commissioner
- Suman as ACP (Special Appearance)
- Sathyan as Inspector Pandian
- Kaali Venkat as Gnanavel Raja, Bank employe
- Sharath Lohithaswa as Politician
- Vincent Asokan as Minister
- Mime Gopi as Maravattai
- Madhusudhan Rao as Stephen Raj, a corrupt police officer
- Sampath Ram as Chezhiyan
- Kavithalaya Krishnan as Bank Manager
- Vivek Prasanna as Loan Collection Agent
- G. Marimuthu as Ashram Owner
- R. S. Shivaji as Bank Manager
- Mahanadi Shankar as Loan Agent
- Rahul Thatha as an old villager
- Abdul as Hari Krishnan, Loan Agent
- Sathya NJ as Hacker
- Jeremy Roske as Hacker
- Pradeep K Vijayan as Sivakumar
- Kothandam as Hospital Visitor
- Sharath Ravi as Mobile shop Owner
- Aranthangi Nisha as Rathi's patient
- Rishikanth as Kesavan
- Ashok Pandian as Col. Vivek Suraj
- Vijay Varadharaj as Joseph
- Harish
- Rail Ravi
- Gemini Mani
- Supergood Subramani
- Hello Kandasamy
- P. S. Mithran as Xerox Shop Owner (special appearance)

== Production ==
Vishal decided to fund and act in a venture directed by newcomer P. S. Mithran in August 2016, and subsequently signed on actress Samantha to play the leading female role in the film. The team signed Arya to play the antagonist in October 2016, with the actor accepting terms without hearing the film's entire script. Subsequently, music composer Yuvan Shankar Raja, cinematographer George C. Williams and editor Ruben were added to the project. Designers NJ Sathya and Neeraja Kona also were revealed to be in charge of the costumes of the lead actors for the film.

The film began production following a launch event in October 2016, with Vishal and Samantha shooting scenes alongside actors Robo Shankar and Delhi Ganesh for the first schedule. Arya later opted out of the film citing that he was not ready to play an antagonist in Tamil cinema, and subsequently the team brought in Arjun. Before getting Arjun on board, Mithran was in talks to get S. J. Surya and Fahadh Faasil the role, but Surya chose Mersal and Fahadh chose Velaikkaran.

== Music ==
Irumbu Thirai

Soundtrack album by Yuvan Shankar Raja
- Released: 1 April 2018
- Recorded: 2018
- Genre: Soundtrack
- Length: 17:39
- Language: Tamil
- Label: Think Music India
- Producer: Yuvan Shankar Raja

Yuvan Shankar Raja chronology
| Balloon (2017) | Irumbu Thirai (2018) | Raja Ranguski (2018) |

The soundtrack and background score features music by Yuvan Shankar Raja. The songs were performed by relatively new singers. The album received positive reviews. IndiaGlitz, in its review, noted, "The album is a definite marker of Yuvan's expertise with Athiradi, Yaar Ivan and Azhage. Playlist worthy" Behindwoods in its review said "Irumbu Thirai album is mix of melodies and theme based songs that will work better with visuals"

Track-List
| No. | Title | Lyrics | Singer(s) | Length |
|---|---|---|---|---|
| 1. | "Angry Bird" | Vignesh Shivan | Jithin Raj | 2:05 |
| 2. | "Azhagae" | Vivek | Arun Kamath, Jonita Gandhi | 4:05 |
| 3. | "Mudhal Murai" | Vivek | Jithin Raj | 3:45 |
| 4. | "Yaar Ivan" | Kaber Vasuki | Kaber Vasuki | 3:45 |
| 5. | "Athiradi" | Vivek | Naveen | 3:59 |
| Total length: | | | | 17:39 |

== Release ==
The film was dubbed and released into Hindi as The Return of Abhimanyu and was dubbed in Telugu under the name of Abhimanyudu. The satellite rights of the film's Tamil and Malayalam version were sold to Zee Tamil and Mazhavil Manorama while the digital rights were sold to ZEE5 and the dubbed versions were sold to Sun NXT and ManoramaMAX respectively. The movie ran successfully in Kerala, Andhra Pradesh and Telangana excluding Tamil Nadu.

== Box office ==
Tamil Nadu theatrical rights of the film were sold for ₹24.5 crore. The film grossed ₹61 crore (US$6.3 million) at the worldwide box office and became a commercial success.
