= Jawan (soundtrack) =

2023 soundtrack album by Anirudh Ravichander

- Soundtrack album cover

Soundtrack album by Anirudh Ravichander
- Released: 5 September 2023
- Recorded: 2022–2023
- Studios: Albuquerque Records, Chennai; AM Studios, Chennai; YRF Studios, Mumbai; Studio DMI, Las Vegas
- Genre: Feature film soundtrack
- Length: 25:29
- Language: Hindi
- Label: T-Series
- Producer: Anirudh Ravichander

Anirudh Ravichander chronology
| Jailer (2023) | Jawan (2023) | Leo (2023) |
External audio
- Official Audio Jukebox on YouTube

Singles from Jawan
- 1. "Zinda Banda" Released: 31 July 2023; 2. "Chaleya" Released: 14 August 2023; 3. "Not Ramaiya Vastavaiya" Released: 29 August 2023; 4. "Chaleya (Arabic Version)" Released: 31 August 2023

Jawan is the soundtrack album, composed by Anirudh Ravichander to the 2023 Hindi film of the same name, directed by Atlee starring Shah Rukh Khan, Nayanthara and Vijay Sethupathi in lead roles. The film is produced by Gauri Khan and Gaurav Verma under their banner Red Chillies Entertainment.

The soundtrack, which marked Anirudh's debut in Hindi film music, featured seven songs with lyrics written by Irshad Kamil, Kumaar and Raja Kumari, while the lyrics for the dubbed versions were written by Vivek and Arivu in Tamil and Chandrabose in Telugu. The album preceded with four singles—"Zinda Banda", "Chaleya", "Not Ramaiya Vastavaiya" and "Chaleya (Arabic Version)"—before its release in its entirety on 5 September 2023.

The music received positive reception from critics and audience, and set several streaming records, with two of the songs: "Zinda Banda" and "Not Ramaiya Vastavaiya" set records for the most-viewed Indian song within 24 hours, the latter with around 53 million views during the time period. At the 69th Filmfare Awards, Jawan's soundtrack received three nominations.

== Background ==
Jawan marked Anirudh's debut as a solo composer in Bollywood, previously having composed a song for the Hindi film David and its Tamil version (2013) and the background score of Jersey (2022). A. R. Rahman was reportedly approached by director Atlee to compose for the film, after their previous collaborations in Mersal (2017) and Bigil (2019). Rahman subsequently declined the offer for reasons unknown, which led to Anirudh's inclusion. He received a remuneration of ₹10 crore (US$1.0 million), thereby becoming the highest-paid Indian music composer.

While most of the songs were penned by Kumaar, Irshad Kamil was chosen as the guest lyricist writing two songs for the film. Vivek and Chandrabose penned all the songs in the Tamil and Telugu dubbed versions. The music rights were bagged by T-Series for ₹36 crore (US$3.7 million) which was a record price for a Hindi album.

"The thing with Jawan [...] there were a lot of emotions going on back to back [...] For example, you take the train heist. Shah Rukh sir is being villainic, and then suddenly within a few seconds, there's a story of a farmer happening somewhere else [...] The main challenge that we faced in Jawan was how we're going to connect these things together musically so that it seems seamless for the audience".

— Anirudh Ravichander in an interview to Film Companion.

Anirudh felt that composing Jawan was similar to doing three films simultaneously, as the film ranged a multitude of emotions in the same time. For the first scene which opens in the tribal area, he decided to use tribal sounds that were more heroic, and while introducing Azad (Khan) he shifted to cooler music, and for Vikram Rathore (Khan), Atlee wanted him to use old-school rock, as the character wears headphones, but Anirudh went ahead with tribal music which was not similar to the earlier theme he used. He described that the music fell organically in place for the film.

== Composition ==
The first song recorded for the film was the introductory song "Zinda Banda". Anirudh stated that he initially recorded the Tamil version of the song "Vandha Edam" first, and later recorded in the original Hindi version. The song opens with a couplet from poet Wasim Barelvi said by Khan (only in the Hindi version) and an opening phrase sung by Mangli under the supervision of Sri Krishna. The second song, "Chaleya" was recorded by Arijit Singh and Shilpa Rao. Anirudh revealed that he met Rao for recording the track, as per Khan's suggestion as she had earlier performed "Besharam Rang" in Pathaan (2023).

The third song in the album "Not Ramaiya Vastavaiya", performed by Anirudh, Vishal Dadlani, Shilpa Rao had the reference to the song "Ramaiya Vastavaiya" from the film Shree 420 (1955). The lyrics also had referenced the "Chaiyya Chaiyya" from the film Dil Se.. (1998). In the film, the song appears in the end credits sequence.

The track "Aararaari Raaro" which had vocals by Deepti Suresh, is a lullaby number. "Jawan Title Track" is performed by Anirudh and Raja Kumari, who wrote the English rap lyrics. As featured in the two-minute promo video and separately released as "Jawan Prevue Theme" in July 2023, she performed the track at a concert held in Brooklyn, New York later that month. The whistle interlude that opened the theme, is performed by Vinay Sridhar, who worked with Anirudh as a sound engineer in his previous ventures. The track "Faraatta" featuring Khan and Padukone was sung by Arijit Singh and Jonita Gandhi, with rap written and performed by Badshah.

== Music video ==
The songs were choreographed by Farah Khan, Vaibhavi Merchant, Shobi and Lalitha. The track "Zinda Banda" was shot at a jail set erected in Chennai during a schedule held in August 2022 with 1000 female dancers across Chennai, Hyderabad, Bangalore, Madurai and Mumbai among several others. The song was shot at a budget of ₹15 crore (US$1.6 million). "Chaleya" featuring Khan and Nayanthara, was shot across Mumbai and Bandra–Worli Sea Link during April 2023, choreographed by Farah Khan. At the same month, she also choreographed the song "Faraatta" featuring Khan and Deepika Padukone which was shot at the Film City, Mumbai. The song "Not Ramaiya Vastavaiya" was shot at the Yash Raj Studios in Mumbai during July 2023, choreographed by Vaibhavi Merchant.

While the music videos for three of the songs, "Zinda Banda", "Chaleya" and "Not Ramaiya Vastavaiya" released as the same date, when they were unveiled as singles to digital platforms, the extended version of the latter and "Faraatta" was released in September 2023.

== Marketing and release ==
Jawan's soundtrack preceded with three singles: "Zinda Banda" was the first to be released on 31 July 2023. It was followed by the second single "Chaleya" on 14 August, and "Not Ramaiya Vastavaiya" released on 29 August 2023. The former had an Arabic version of the song performed by Grini and Jamila El Badaoui, written by Mohamed El Maghribi, and was released at an event held at the Burj Khalifa on 31 August 2023. The album featuring seven tracks was released on 5 September 2023.

== Track listing ==
=== Hindi ===
| No. | Title | Lyrics | Singer(s) | Length |
|---|---|---|---|---|
| 1. | "Zinda Banda" | Irshad Kamil, Wasim Barelvi | Anirudh Ravichander, Mangli, Shah Rukh Khan | 4:24 |
| 2. | "Chaleya" | Kumaar | Arijit Singh, Shilpa Rao | 3:20 |
| 3. | "Not Ramaiya Vastavaiya" | Kumaar | Anirudh Ravichander, Vishal Dadlani, Shilpa Rao | 3:23 |
| 4. | "Aararaari Raaro" | Irshad Kamil | Deepthi Suresh | 4:38 |
| 5. | "Jawan Title Track" | Raja Kumari | Shah Rukh Khan, Anirudh Ravichander, Raja Kumari | 3:08 |
| 6. | "Faraatta" | Kumaar | Arijit Singh, Jonita Gandhi, Badshah | 3:15 |
| 7. | "Chaleya" (Arabic Version) | Kumaar, Mohamed El Maghribi (Arabic) | Grini, Jamila El Badaoui | 3:20 |
| Total length: | | | | 25:29 |

=== Tamil ===
| No. | Title | Lyrics | Singer(s) | Length |
|---|---|---|---|---|
| 1. | "Vandha Edam" | Vivek | Anirudh Ravichander, Mangli | 4:13 |
| 2. | "Hayyoda" | Vivek | Anirudh Ravichander, Priya Mali | 3:20 |
| 3. | "Not Ramaiya Vastavaiya" | Vivek | Anirudh Ravichander, Sreerama Chandra, Rakshita Suresh | 3:23 |
| 4. | "Aararaari Raaro" | Vivek | Deepthi Suresh | 4:38 |
| 5. | "Jawan Title Track" | Raja Kumari | Anirudh Ravichander, Raja Kumari | 3:08 |
| 6. | "Pattasa" | Vivek, Arivu | Nakash Aziz, Jonita Gandhi, Arivu | 3:15 |
| Total length: | | | | 21:57 |

=== Telugu ===
| No. | Title | Lyrics | Singer(s) | Length |
|---|---|---|---|---|
| 1. | "Dhumme Dhulipelaa" | Chandrabose | Anirudh Ravichander, Mangli | 4:13 |
| 2. | "Chalona" | Chandrabose | Adithya RK, Priya Mali | 3:20 |
| 3. | "Not Ramaiya Vastavaiya" | Chandrabose | Anirudh Ravichander, Sreerama Chandra, Rakshita Suresh | 3:23 |
| 4. | "Nallaani Cheekatilo" | Chandrabose | Deepthi Suresh | 4:38 |
| 5. | "Jawan Title Track" | Raja Kumari | Anirudh Ravichander, Raja Kumari | 3:08 |
| 6. | "Galatta" | Chandrabose | Nakash Aziz, Jonita Gandhi, Arivu | 3:15 |
| Total length: | | | | 21:57 |

== Background score ==
Jawan

Film score by Anirudh Ravichander
- Released: 6 October 2023
- Recorded: 2022–2023
- Studios: Albuquerque Records, Chennai
- Genre: Film score
- Length: 10:50
- Language: Hindi
- Label: T-Series
- Producer: Anirudh Ravichander
External audio
- Film Score on YouTube

The film further featured six songs in the background score, that was released as a separate album on 6 October 2023 by T-Series. Two songs: "Kalki Theme" and "Eeram Theme" were written by Kausar Munir, while the remainder consisted of Tamil, English and Spanish songs written by Vivek, Heisenberg and Sanjeeta Bhattacharya, who also played the role of Helena in the film. The album was also released in Tamil and Telugu on 8 October, while except for "Kalki Theme" and "Eeram Theme", the rest of the tracks were retained from the original version. The lyrics for the aforementioned songs were dubbed and written by Vivek in Tamil, and Krishna Kanth in Telugu, respectively.

=== Original ===
| No. | Title | Lyrics | Singer(s) | Length |
|---|---|---|---|---|
| 1. | "Krishna" | Vivek | Niranjana Ramanan | 1:38 |
| 2. | "Kalki Theme" | Kausar Munir | Kailash Kher | 1:48 |
| 3. | "Eeram Theme" | Kausar Munir | Neha Kakkar | 1:49 |
| 4. | "Maasi Theme" | Heisenberg | Anirudh Ravichander | 2:59 |
| 5. | "Mis Chicas" (Spanish) | Sanjeeta Bhattacharya | Sanjeeta Bhattacharya | 1:03 |
| 6. | "Vikram Rathore" (English) | Heisenberg | Anirudh Ravichander | 1:33 |
| Total length: | | | | 10:50 |

=== Tamil ===
| No. | Title | Lyrics | Singer(s) | Length |
|---|---|---|---|---|
| 1. | "Krishna" | Vivek | Niranjana Ramanan | 1:38 |
| 2. | "Kalki Theme" | Vivek | Mahalingam, Pushpavanam Kuppusamy | 1:48 |
| 3. | "Eeram Theme" | Vivek | Vaikom Vijayalakshmi, Saindhavi | 1:49 |
| 4. | "Maasi Theme" | Heisenberg | Anirudh Ravichander | 2:59 |
| 5. | "Mis Chicas" (Spanish) | Sanjeeta Bhattacharya | Sanjeeta Bhattacharya | 1:03 |
| 6. | "Vikram Rathore" (English) | Heisenberg | Anirudh Ravichander | 1:33 |
| Total length: | | | | 10:50 |

=== Telugu ===
| No. | Title | Lyrics | Singer(s) | Length |
|---|---|---|---|---|
| 1. | "Krishna" | Vivek | Niranjana Ramanan | 1:38 |
| 2. | "Kalki Theme" | Krishna Kanth | Kareemullah | 1:48 |
| 3. | "Eeram Theme" | Krishna Kanth | Ramya Behara | 1:49 |
| 4. | "Maasi Theme" | Heisenberg | Anirudh Ravichander | 2:59 |
| 5. | "Mis Chicas" (Spanish) | Sanjeeta Bhattacharya | Sanjeeta Bhattacharya | 1:03 |
| 6. | "Vikram Rathore" (English) | Heisenberg | Anirudh Ravichander | 1:33 |
| Total length: | | | | 10:50 |

== Reception ==
The film's music received positive reviews from critics. Meera Venugopal of Radio Mirchi wrote "Jawan has an exquisite blend of tracks, each contributing to the album's unique identity. The album is unique from any of Anirudh's previous compositions and it stands as a testament to his versatility." Trisha Bhattacharya of India Today wrote "Each song finds its ideal spot within the narrative, contributing significantly to the storyline. The soundtrack of 'Jawan' may appear less impressive when heard independently of the movie. Nonetheless, once you grasp the context behind each song, you'll likely find it hard to resist replaying the tracks."

Renuka Vyahare of The Times of India said that the music complimented the "style and nature" with "Zinda Banda" and "Chaleya" being the best picks from the album; the latter was however criticised of its poor placement. Proma Khosla of IndieWire wrote "Anirudh's propulsive soundtrack entertains throughout" and called the title track, as the "catchiest" of all themes. Shilajit Mitra of The Hindu criticised the music as "generic" despite Anirudh's best efforts. Abhimanyu Mathur of Daily News and Analysis criticised the film's music but complemented the background score as the film's "beating heart" which "keeps you on the edge of your seat, adding gravitas to massy moments and giving depth to the emotional ones".

Reviewing the song "Zinda Banda" at the same website, Prachi Arya of India Today wrote "The song encapsulates the spirit of the film, exuding grandness, vibrancy and celebration", while Hindustan Times-based critic commented that "The song is a fun and groovy one as it makes you want to dance to its beats." A critic from The Indian Express compared the song "Not Ramaiya Vastavaiya" with "Ghungroo" from War (2019) and "Besharam Rang" from Pathaan (2023).

At the 69th Filmfare Awards, Anirudh Ravichander was nominated for 'Best Music Director'; Deepthi Suresh and Shilpa Rao were nominated for 'Best Playback Singer – Female,' for "Aararaari Raaro" and "Chaleya," respectively.

== Chart performance ==
| Chart | Song | Peak position | Ref. |
|---|---|---|---|
| Billboard Global 200 (Billboard) | "Chaleya" | 72 | |
| India (Billboard) | "Zinda Banda" | 2 | |
| India (Billboard) | "Chaleya" | 1 | |
| India (Billboard) | "Hayyoda" | 7 | |
| India (Billboard) | "Not Ramaiya Vastavaiya" | 8 | |
| MENA (IFPI) | "Chaleya" | 8 | |
| UAE (IFPI) | "Chaleya" | 1 | |
| UAE (IFPI) | "Not Ramaiya Vastavaiya" | 6 | |

== Impact ==
The track "Zinda Banda" became the most viewed Indian song in 24 hours, garnering over 47 million views, until "Not Ramaiya Vastavaiya" garnering over 53 million views upon its release in August 2023. The track "Chaleya" became the most-streamed song on Spotify in a single day, as it was played over 2.4 million times on 13 September 2023.

After the song "Zinda Banda" was released in July 2023, the hook step choreographed by Shobi Paulraj and performed by Khan in the music video went viral. Many people have recreated the hook step (signature step) by recording themselves dancing to the song and posting their videos on social media. Later, other songs followed this trend.

== Album credits ==
Credits adapted from T-Series

- Anirudh Ravichander – singer (tracks: 1, 5), composer (all tracks), producer (all tracks), musical arrangements (all tracks), Keyboard, Synth & Rhythm Programming
- Mangli – opening vocals (track: 1)
- Aparna Harikumar – backing vocalist (track: 4)
- Adithya RK – backing vocalist (track: 4)
- Yogi Sekar – backing vocalist (track: 4)
- Ahana Balaji – child vocalist (track: 4)
- Raja Kumari – rap (track: 5)
- Badshah – rap (track: 6)
- Keba Jeremiah – electric guitar (track:1), acoustic guitar (track: 4), bass guitar (track: 4)
- Balesh – shehnai (track: 1)
- Satish Raghunathan – whistle (track: 3)
- MT Aditya – tabla (track: 3)
- Budapest Scoring Orchestra – (track: 5)
  - Geoffrey Pope – conductor
  - Balasubramanian G – orchestrator, co-ordinator, session supervisor
  - Abishek V – co-orchestrator
  - Sanjay RA – additional orchestrator
  - Bálint Sapszon – session producer
  - Dénes Rédly – recording engineer (Rottenbiller Hall)
  - Viktor Szabó – recording engineer (Rottenbiller Hall)
  - Anna Sapszo – librarian
  - Abin Ponnachan – pro-tools operator
- Kalyan – rhythm production (track: 1, 5)
- Shashank Vijay – rhythm programming (all tracks)
- IC – keyboard programming (tracks: 1, 4), orchestral programming (tracks: 5)
- Nakul Abhyankar – orchestral programming (tracks: 5)
- Advait Samrat – orchestral programming (tracks: 5)
- Arish – keyboard programming (all tracks)
- Pradeep PJ – keyboard programming (all tracks)
- Ananthakrrishnan – music advisor (all tracks), solo violin (track: 4)
- Harish Ram L H – music supervisor (all tracks), music editor (all tracks)
- Sajith Satya – creative consultant (all tracks)
- Sukanto Singha – vocal recording (tracks: 2, 6)
- Nacho Larraza – vocal recording (tracks: 5)
- Srinivasan M – recording engineer, mixing engineer (Albuquerque Records, Chennai) [all tracks]
- Shivakiran S – recording engineer (Albuquerque Records, Chennai) [all tracks]
- Rajesh Kannan – recording engineer (Albuquerque Records, Chennai) [tracks: 2, 3]
- Jishnu Vijayan – recording engineer (Albuquerque Records, Chennai) [tracks: 3, 4, 5, 6], keyboard programming (track: 4, 5), orchestral programming (tracks: 5)
- Vijay Dayal – recording engineer (YRF Studios, Chennai) [tracks: 3]
- Chinmay Mestry – recording engineer (YRF Studios, Chennai) [tracks: 3]
- Pradeep Menon – recording engineer (AM Studios, Chennai) [tracks: 4]
- Manoj Raman – recording engineer (AM Studios, Chennai) [tracks: 4]
- Vinay Sridhar – mixing engineer (Albuquerque Records, Chennai) [all tracks], whistle (track: 5)
- Luca Pretolesi – mastering engineer (Studio DMI, Las Vegas) [all tracks]
- Alistair Pintus – mastering assistance
- Velavan B – music co-ordinator
