= Kafeel Khan =

Indian doctor and lecturer

- Born: Gorakhpur, Uttar Pradesh, India
- Citizenship: Indian
- Education: Kasturba Medical College, Manipal, Karnataka, India (MBBS, MD (paediatrics))
- Employers: Sikkim Manipal Institute of Medical Sciences (till 2016); Baba Raghav Das Medical College, Gorakhpur (2016-17)
- Children: 1

Kafeel Khan is an Indian doctor, author and former lecturer at the Department of Paediatrics, Baba Raghav Das Medical College (BRD Medical College), Gorakhpur, Uttar Pradesh, India.

== Biography ==
Khan was born in Gorakhpur, Uttar Pradesh. He did his MBBS and MD (paediatrics) from KMC, Manipal, Karnataka. Khan has worked as an assistant professor in SMIMS, Gangtok (Sikkim). He got permanent commission on 8 August 2016 as a lecturer in BRD medical college.

== BRD Medical College death cases controversy ==
It later emerged that a large number of deaths occurred after the hospital's oxygen supply was cut on 10 August, during which Khan was present at the scene, over non-payment of dues. Khan was hailed as a hero after media outlets reported that he had spent his money to buy oxygen cylinders after the piped supply had been cut, and worked overtime to remedy the situation.

The Uttar Pradesh (UP) government denied that any deaths had occurred due to oxygen shortage. On 13 August 2017, he was removed as the nodal officer in charge of the encephalitis ward on charges of dereliction of duty and carrying out private practice. A first information report (FIR) was registered against him and others after a written complaint by DG Medical Education, K. K. Gupta, under IPC sections 409, 308, 120B, 420, Prevention of Corruption Act, Section 8 of the IPC, Section 15 of the Indian Medical Council Act, 1956. On 2 September, Khan was arrested after a court issued a non-bailable warrant. The resident doctors association of AIIMS condemned his arrest and said he was being made a scapegoat.

While in prison, Khan wrote a 10-page letter, detailing his version of what transpired when the deaths at BRD Hospital occurred due to the oxygen supply being cut. He claimed that he called the head of department, the principal and acting principal of BRD, the district magistrate of Gorakhpur, the chief medical superintendent of Gorakhpur and BRD Medical College, and his other colleagues to inform them of the situation. He said that he also called local oxygen supplier agencies and begged them to immediately arrange for oxygen cylinders at BRD, and called nearby hospitals. He narrated that he went out to buy oxygen cylinders himself. He was able to scrape 250 cylinders together, paying for them himself and promising the suppliers that he would arrange for the rest of the payment soon. He carried some in his car and arranged with the deputy inspector general of police for a truck and manpower from the Armed Border Force to deliver the others. He wrote that his family had been harassed by the police. He also wrote that in an encounter with Chief Minister Yogi Adityanath, the latter had expressed anger at him.

While in prison, Khan's wife alleged that he was denied medical care. Two days after the allegation, on 19 April 2018, the police took him for a medical examination, which had been due a week earlier.

In April 2018, the Indian Medical Association (IMA) released a statement in defence of Khan, saying that he had been framed. The secretary of the IMA blamed the state government officials and demanded a high level probe. Over 200 health professionals and allied activists wrote a letter to Uttar Pradesh chief minister, Yogi Adityanath, demanding justice for Khan, his immediate release and the dropping of "false charges" against him.

On 19 April, while responding to an RTI query, the BRD administration admitted that it was facing shortage of oxygen cylinders on the night of 11 August 2018. It said that around six cylinders were bought from other hospitals and the then nodal officer Khan had arranged four oxygen cylinders on his own.

On 25 April, Khan was released on bail after 9 months of imprisonment. The court ruled that there was no evidence of medical negligence on his part. Khan insisted on calling the incident a massacre and blames the UP administration for it. On being subsequently interviewed, Khan claimed to be made a scapegoat of the Yogi Adityanath Government. Khan also regretted that despite their best collective efforts, he and his team could not save those 70 children from death.

In July 2018, it was reported that Khan had gone bankrupt. Khan said that, "People have stopped doing business with my brothers as they think it might upset Yogi ji. We still have properties worth crores but now we do not have buyers as nobody is willing to do business with my family".

On 13 August 2018, Khan received a death threat on his mobile. On the same day, student activist Umar Khalid, was attacked by an unidentified armed mob at an event in constitution club in Delhi, which Khan was also attending.

=== Attacks on Khan's family ===
On 10 June 2018, Khan's brother, Kashif Jameel, was shot by unidentified assailants who were on motorbikes. He received three bullet wounds on his right upper arm, neck and chin, but survived the attack. This was not the first time he was attacked. In 2014 also some people entered his house and aimed pistol at him. Apparently, he is involved in multiple land disputes. This incident however took place in the Humayunpur North area near JP Hospital, 500 metres from the Gorakhnath Temple, where the UP chief minister was staying that night. In the aftermath of the incident, Khan said he had apprehended a murder attempt on his family members. He alleged that the police caused a delay of a few hours in his brother receiving urgent medical care. He further accused Bharatiya Janata Party (BJP) MP from Bansgaon, Kamlesh Paswan and his three associates of carrying out the attacks.

On 24 February 2020, Khan's uncle, a property dealer, was shot dead in Gorakhpur. The Uttar Pradesh Police stated that the death was unconnected to Khan's case and appeared to be in relation to a property dispute.

=== Acquittal ===
On 27 September 2019, Khan was acquitted of all charges in relation to the 2017 Gorakhpur Hospital deaths. According to the departmental inquiry report, "The allegations against the accused are insufficient ... Therefore it is submitted that the accused officer is not guilty".

The departmental inquiry suggested that Khan had, until 2016, engaged in private practice in addition to his work at the hospital, which was alleged to be a violation of service rules. However, no action has been taken against him for that.

== Medical aid during the Nipah virus outbreak ==
In March 2018, Khan volunteered to provide medical assistance during the outbreak of the Nipah virus in Kozkhikode district in Kerala. His offer of aid was accepted by the chief minister of Kerala, Pinarayi Vijayan.

== Re-arrest and release ==
Khan was arrested in Mumbai on 13 December 2019 by a special task force of the Uttar Pradesh police for offences under the National Security Act 1980, in relation to a speech made by him at Aligarh Muslim University in earlier that month during the Citizenship Amendment Act protests in India. The Uttar Pradesh Police filed a first information report (FIR) accusing Khan with committing an offence under Section 153A of the Indian Penal Code, which relates to "Promoting enmity between different groups on grounds of religion, race, place of birth, residence, language, etc., and doing acts prejudicial to maintenance of harmony". The FIR alleged that Khan's speech amounted to a criminal offence because it "sowed the seeds of discord and disharmony" among students, and included disparaging remarks against Rashtriya Swayamsevak Sangh and Union Home Minister Amit Shah.

He was granted bail on 10 February 2020 by an Aligarh court, but was re-arrested on 13 February 2020 and charged with offences under the National Security Act, before his actual release from jail. The National Security Act allows preventive detention without trial for three-month periods, and on 12 May 2020, following the lapse of three months, his detention was extended for a second three-month period, until 12 August 2020. District Magistrate Chandra Bhushan Singh stated that the charges under the National Security Act were on the basis of confidential intelligence that suggested that Khan might, in the future, cause a law and order situation, and that consequently the order of preventive detention was warranted.

On 1 September 2020, he was released by the Allahabad High Court, and all charges under the NSA against him were dropped.

=== Prison conditions in the COVID-19 pandemic ===
On 19 March 2020, Khan wrote to the prime minister of India, Narendra Modi, offering to provide medical assistance during the COVID-19 pandemic in India. He was not permitted to do so because he was arrested under NSA for his inflammatory speeches in December 2019.

On 23 March 2020, the Supreme Court of India ordered all states and union territories in India to establish panels to consider the release of all convicts who have been jailed for offences for up to seven years, in order to decongest prisons in the wake of the COVID-19 pandemic in India. Khan was not among prisoners released under these circumstances because of National Security Act (NSA) charges.

In July 2020, a letter from Khan detailing conditions inside the Mathura Prison, where he is being detained, was published by several news outlets. His letter claimed that over 150 prisoners shared just one toilet facility, that the level of hygiene was insufficient, and that a number of prisoners were unwell, raising concerns about the spread of illness in the wake of the COVID-19 pandemic. Khan's brother, Adeel Khan, claimed to have received the handwritten letter on 1 July 2020; however, prison officials denied that Khan had written any such letter, and suggested that the letter was fake. In a later interview, he said that he had been denied food and water to the point that he ate grass from the ground, and that he was beaten until "my skin had peeled off in many places".

=== Release and resumption of career ===
On 26 June 2020, a group of officials and experts in the United Nations called on the Indian government to release political prisoners who had been arrested for protesting India's Citizenship Amendment Act, including Khan. The letter was signed by a number of special rapporteurs, including the special rapporteur on the Situation of Human Rights Defenders, the special rapporteur on the protection and promotion of the right to freedom of speech and expression, and the members of the U.N. Working Group on Arbitrary Detentions.

On 1 September 2020, the Allahabad High Court ordered Khan to be released immediately, and dropped the charges under the National Security Act 1980 against him. The court observed that the speech for which Khan had been arrested did not disrupt the peace or promote hate or violent reactions; rather, the court found that the speech "gives a call for national integrity and unity among the citizens. The speech also deprecates any kind of violence." The High Court noted that the evidence provided by the prosecution was insufficient to warrant charges under the National Security Act, and that Khan had been denied the opportunity to examine the evidence led against him. The court observed that this constituted a violation of Khan's constitutional rights, and accordingly set aside his detention.

According to Khan, his time in prison had led him to read about topics outside medicine and increased his political activism. As of 2023, he works at a private hospital in Chennai as a paediatrician.

== Further charges ==
In November 2023, Uttar Pardesh Police filed a case against Khan (and "four or five unidentified persons") for allegedly inciting people against government and creating hatred in society through his book, The Gorakhpur Hospital Tragedy: A Doctor's Memory of a Deadly Medical Crisis. The complaint also mentioned that five unknown people were discussing Dr. Khan's book, removing the government and creating division in society.

== Publication ==
Khan has written the Manipal Manual of Clinical Paediatrics for MBBS students. Khan has also written several articles for news outlets and journals:

1. Khan, Kafeel (5 November 2020), "5 Ways to Counter the 'Triple Epidemic'", The Citizen
2. Khan, Kafeel (7 December 2020), "COVID-19's Negative Impact on Mental Health Is a Shadow Pandemic", The Leaflet
3. Khan, Kafeel (26 November 2020), "Think Beyond Covid-19 As Pollution Is An Everlasting Pandemic", Outlook
4. Khan, Kafeel (7 November 2020), "COVID-19 Pandemic has Shown India Why Healthcare Reforms are Imperative", The Leaflet

In 2021, his book, The Gorakhpur Hospital Tragedy: A Doctor's Memory of a Deadly Medical Crisis was released. Originally in English, the book was later translated into Malayalam, Hindi (at first being pulled by the publisher due to political pressure according to Khan), Urdu, Marathi and Tamil. He is currently working on a second book as of 2023.

== Family ==
Khan's wife is a doctor who runs a private clinic. He also has a young daughter.

== In popular culture ==
- In the 2023 film Jawan, the character played by Sanya Malhotra, Dr. Eeram and her segment, was loosely based on Khan and the real-life incidents surrounding him.
