= Zinda Banda =

2023 Indian song by Anirudh Ravichander

- Song cover

Single by Anirudh Ravichander

from the album Jawan
- Language: Hindi
- Released: 31 July 2023
- Recorded: 2022–2023
- Studio: Albuquerque Records, Chennai; Studio DMI, Las Vegas
- Genre: EDM; kuthu; dance; pop
- Length: 4:24
- Label: T-Series
- Composer: Anirudh Ravichander
- Lyricist: Irshad Kamil
- Producer: Anirudh Ravichander

Jawan track listing
- 1. "Zinda Banda"; 2. "Chaleya"; 3. "Not Ramaiya Vastavaiya"; 4. "Aararaari Raaro"; 5. "Jawan Title Track"; 6. "Faraatta"; 7. "Chaleya (Arabic Version)"

Music video
- "Zinda Banda" on YouTube

"Zinda Banda" is an Indian Hindi-language song composed and recorded by Anirudh Ravichander, with lyrics by Irshad Kamil for the soundtrack album of the 2023 Indian film Jawan. It was released on 31 July 2023 as the first single from the album, through T-Series.

The song was also released in Tamil as "Vandha Edam" and in Telugu as "Dhumme Dhulipelaa". Upon release, the song received positive reviews from critics and audiences with the hook step performed by Shah Rukh Khan under the choreography of Shobi Paulraj becoming popular.

== Composition and lyrics ==
"Zinda Banda" was the first song composed for the film which was first recorded in its Tamil version, "Vandha Edam" and later in the original Hindi version. On composing the track, Anirudh recalled that Khan was synonymous for his iconic songs that transcends generations and had to do justice to his stardom.

The song features lyrics written by Irshad Kamil, who was the guest lyricist for the film. It opens with a couplet from a poem written by Wasim Barelvi and said by Khan (only in the original version), while the female vocals were performed by Mangli under the supervision of Sri Krishna.

== Music video ==
The song was shot in August 2022 for five days at a schedule in Chennai with the choreography of Shobi Paulraj. Featuring Khan, along with Priyamani, Sanya Malhotra, Sanjeeta Bhattacharya, Lehar Khan and Girija Oak, the song featured around 1000 dancers from Chennai, Hyderabad, Mumbai and Bangalore. The reported production cost for picturization of the song was ₹15 crore (US$1.6 million) becoming the most expensive Indian film song ever shot. It was also reshot for the Tamil version. Director Atlee made a cameo appearance in the song.

== Release and reception ==
The song was released as the lead single from the album on 31 July 2023, with an accompanying music video.

Reviewing the song "Zinda Banda", Prachi Arya of India Today wrote "The song encapsulates the spirit of the film, exuding grandness, vibrancy and celebration", while Hindustan Times-based critic commented that "The song is a fun and groovy one as it makes you want to dance to its beats." Renuka Vyahare of The Times of India cited "Zinda Banda" as the pick from the album. In contrast, Raghav Bikhchandani of ThePrint compared it inferior to Vishal–Shekhar's composition "Jhoome Jo Pathaan" from Pathaan (2023). He compared the melodies and sounding of the track, which was too similar to "I'm Shipping Up to Boston" (2005) by the Dropkick Murphys and the vocal delivery to that of Vishal Dadlani's "Malhari" from Bajirao Mastani (2015).

== Impact ==
Within 24 hours of its release, the video song garnered 46 million views becoming the most-viewed Indian film song of 2023 in a span of 24 hours surpassing "Jai Shri Ram" from Adipurush. This record was however surpassed by another song from the same film, "Not Ramaiya Vastavaiya" that garnered 53 million views. The hook step from the song choreographed by Shobi went viral, leading to numerous recreations across social media. Mohanlal recreated the hook step at an award show in Kochi.

== Other versions ==
The song was released in Tamil as "Vandha Edam" with lyrics written by Vivek and in Telugu as "Dhumme Dhulipelaa" with lyrics written by Chandrabose; both the versions of the song were sung by Anirudh.

== Credits ==
- Anirudh Ravichander – singer, composer, arranger, producer, keyboard programming, synth programming, rhythm programming, backing vocalist
- Irshad Kamil – lyricist
- Mangli – opening vocals
- Sri Krishna – vocal supervision
- Keba Jeremiah – electric guitar
- Balesh – shehnai
- Kalyan – rhythm production
- Shashank Vijay – rhythm programming
- IC – keyboard programming
- Arish – keyboard programming
- Pradeep PJ – keyboard programming
- Harish Ram LH – music supervisor
- Ananthakrrishnan – music advisor
- Sajith Sathya – creative consultant
- Srinivasan M – recording and mixing engineer (Albuquerque Records, Chennai)
- Shivakiran S – recording engineer (Albuquerque Records, Chennai)
- Vinay Sridhar – mixing engineer (Albuquerque Records, Chennai)
- Luca Pretolesi – mastering engineer (Studio DMI, Las Vegas)
- Alistair Pintus – mastering assistance
- Velavan B – musicians coordinator

== Chart performance ==
Chart	Peak position	Ref.
Asian Music Chart (OCC)	16	
India (Billboard)	2	

== Accolades ==
Award	Date of ceremony	Category	Recipient	Result	Ref.
Filmfare Awards	28 January 2024	Best Choreography	Shobi Paulraj	Nominated	
