= Eluru outbreak =

Unknown disease outbreak in Andhra Pradesh, India, 2020

- Disease: Acute neurological disease
- Source: Triazofos (Organophosphate) pesticide contamination in the water supply
- First outbreak: Eluru, Andhra Pradesh, India
- First reported: 5 December 2020
- Date: 5–12 December 2020
- Confirmed cases: 614
- Recovered: 613
- Deaths: 1
- Territories: Eluru, Denduluru & Kovvali

Mystery disease cases in Eluru Deaths Recoveries Active cases
Date	# of cases	# of deaths
2020-12-05		0(n.a.)
2020-12-06		1(n.a.)
2020-12-07		1(=)
2020-12-08		1(=)
2020-12-09		1(=)
2020-12-10		1(=)
2020-12-11		1(=)
2020-12-12		1(=)

In early December 2020, an acute neurological disease broke out in Eluru, a city located in the southern Indian state of Andhra Pradesh. The first case was reported on 5 December, with hundreds more falling ill and one person dying over the next week. The cause was initially unknown, but on 20 December, AIIMS and NEERI Research Institute came to a conclusion that pesticides leaching into the water supply is the most likely reason.

== Symptoms ==
Reported symptoms include headache, vomiting, dizziness, convulsions, seizures, nausea, anxiety, loss of consciousness, mental confusion, miosis and other neurological symptoms, which have been described as being similar to epilepsy. The individuals who have been reported to have the disease, especially children, have reported a sudden onset of vomiting after complaining of burning eyes.

== Outbreak ==
The first case was recorded on the evening of 5 December. By the next day, a few hundred more people were admitted to hospital with similar symptoms. The only reported death was a 45-year-old man who had reported similar symptoms. According to CNN, he died of an unrelated cardiac arrest on 5 December, but the Eluru hospital superintendent stated he died due to the symptoms and put him on the official death toll for the illness. The disease was originally found in the One Town area before spreading to other parts of the city as well as the rural area and Denduluru village. Most patients were admitted in the Eluru government hospital, but some that needed better care were sent to institutions in Vijayawada and Guntur.

By the night of 7 December, more than 400 people had been stricken by the disease. While the disease affects all age groups, over 300 of the infected are children. The total reported number of infected had risen to 450 and the discharged to 200 by 7 December. While the symptoms have been reported as being "the same across age groups and gender," a majority of patients are in the age group of 20-30 years old. Hundreds of children were affected by the disease.

The rate of new cases drastically decreased on 8 December, although six people who were previously discharged suffered a second seizure and were readmitted. On 10 December, two other people who got the disease died, causing some media to speculate that their deaths were due to the disease. However, the district's health commissioner announced they had died from unrelated conditions - one from a stroke and one from COVID-19 - and that only the original death remained on the official count. Only two people were admitted into the hospital the next day, with most patients having recovered and thirteen still requiring treatment as of 12 December. On 12 December, no new cases were recorded, and state health minister Alla Kali Krishna Srinivas stated that "the city is heading towards a zero mystery illness situation."

== Investigation of cause ==
Samples from patients and of the local water were collected the same day to determine the cause of the outbreak. Specialists from several worldwide and Indian scientific and medical institutions, such as the National Centre for Disease Control, All India Institutes of Medical Sciences, the World Health Organization, the Indian Council of Medical Research, the National Institute of Nutrition, Centre for Cellular and Molecular Biology, and the Indian Institute of Chemical Technology had been sent to assess the situation and analyze the samples. However, the tests did not detect any water pollution or known virus infections (including COVID-19) upon analysis.

Andhra Pradesh's Health Department reported that "initial blood test[s] did not find any evidence of viral infection." Blood samples have also been tested for antibodies and for bacterial infections such as meningitis. Viruses such as SARS-CoV-2, Japanese encephalitis, dengue, chikungunya, hepatitis and rabies were ruled out as the cause. Since "people not linked to the municipal water supply [have also] fallen ill", water contamination was also initially discarded, and so was air pollution. Blood tests and CT scans were not able to establish the cause or origin of the disease and cerebrospinal fluid tests "turned out to be normal." As of 7 December 2020, the disease has been determined to be non-contagious.

BJP Member of Parliament Narasimha Rao suspected that organochlorides might be the cause after talking to medical experts. Organochlorides are used as pesticides as well as in anti-mosquito fogging. On 7 December 2020, Indian health authorities unofficially declared: "Mostly yes, but we are waiting for the laboratory report [for confirmation]" when asked about organochlorine being the disease-triggering agent. This theory was later ruled out by authorities because there would have been a higher rate of respiratory issues and fatalities.

Later preliminary results pointed to high lead and nickel content in drinking water and milk as possible agents via lead poisoning. Blood tests also found high concentrations of the same materials in patients. State authorities later ruled out air and water as the medium for heavy metals and started testing vegetable and fruit samples. It has also been speculated that pesticides may have leached into the water supply after flash floods. Other theories include improper disposal of batteries as well as excessive bleaching and chlorinating of the water supply to prevent COVID-19 transmission.

On 16 December, the Andhra Pradesh government concluded that pesticide residue in the water was the "main reason" for the illness, based on findings from studies conducted by the All India Institute of Medical Sciences (AIIMS) and the National Environmental Engineering and Research Institute (NEERI). AIIMS also reported on high heavy metal content in milk, while NEERI found mercury in surface water higher than the allowed concentration.

Mahesh Kumar Mummadi et al. concluded that Triazofos (Organophosphate) pesticide contamination of water as a probable cause of the outbreak.

== Responses and reactions ==
Y. S. Jaganmohan Reddy, the former chief minister of Andhra Pradesh, has faced criticism from the opposition for his perceived failure to prevent the outbreak by neglecting water sanitation in the area.

Chandrababu Naidu, the leader of the state's opposition Telugu Desam Party, blamed the ruling government for the outbreak, claiming that it had not taken action to decontaminate the local drinking water. The Telugu Desam Party called for a full enquiry, claiming that the spread of the illness was caused by contamination.

Srinivas initially reported "[a]ll the patients are out of danger. Of the 300-odd affected, about 125 have been discharged by Sunday evening."

On 7 December, the government announced it had commenced "a door-to-door survey". The same day, CM Reddy visited the patients in Eluru and gave instructions to his ministers on patient care and supervision, ordering that discharged patients be observed for a month afterwards. The central government announced that a three-person team would be sent to Eluru on 8 December to probe the situation. The state government later formed a 21-member council which included representatives from the All India Institutes of Medical Sciences and the World Health Organization to investigate the outbreak.

Due to reports that lead in vegetables was possibly causing the illness, sales by local vendors were severely reduced as people bought more meat and went to other cities to buy vegetables instead.

== See also ==
- 2019 Bihar encephalitis outbreak
- 2017 Gorakhpur hospital deaths
- COVID-19 pandemic in Andhra Pradesh
