= Jawan (film) =

2023 Indian film by Atlee

- Theatrical release poster
- Directed by: Atlee
- Screenplay by: Atlee; S. Ramanagirivasan
- Dialogues by: Sumit Arora
- Story by: Atlee
- Produced by: Gauri Khan
- Starring: Shah Rukh Khan; Vijay Sethupathi; Nayanthara; Deepika Padukone; Priyamani; Sanya Malhotra; Sunil Grover
- Cinematography: G. K. Vishnu
- Visual effects by: Haresh Hingorani
- Edited by: Ruben
- Music by: Anirudh Ravichander
- Production company: Red Chillies Entertainment
- Distributed by: see below
- Release date: 7 September 2023
- Running time: 169 minutes
- Country: India
- Language: Hindi
- Budget: ₹300 crore
- Box office: ₹1,150 crore

Jawan (transl. Soldier) is a 2023 Indian Hindi-language action thriller film co-written and directed by Atlee in his Hindi film debut, and produced by Gauri Khan under Red Chillies Entertainment. It stars Shah Rukh Khan in a dual role alongside Vijay Sethupathi, Nayanthara, Deepika Padukone, Priyamani, Sanya Malhotra, and Sunil Grover. In the film, a vigilante recruits inmates and commits acts that shed light on corruption in India.

Principal photography began in September 2021, and took place in Pune, Mumbai, Goregaon, Hyderabad, Chennai, Rajasthan, and Aurangabad. The soundtrack and film score were composed by Anirudh Ravichander, with the cinematography and editing handled by G. K. Vishnu and Ruben respectively. Some portions of the film were simultaneously reshot for the Tamil version, particularly Khan's appearance in the song "Zinda Banda" ("Vandha Edam" in Tamil), Sethupathi's portions and scenes featuring Yogi Babu.

Jawan was theatrically released on 7 September 2023 in standard, IMAX, and 4DX, coinciding with Janmashtami, and received positive reviews from critics with praise towards the cast performances, direction, action sequences, soundtrack, and cinematography. The film grossed over ₹1,100 crore (US$120 million) at the box-office, becoming the highest-grossing Indian film of 2023. As of November 2026, it ranks as the ninth highest-grossing Indian film of all time.

At the 69th Filmfare Awards, the film received 14 nominations, including Best Film and Best Director. At the 71st National Film Awards, the film won two awards: Best Actor in a Leading Role (Khan) and Best Female Playback Singer (Shilpa Rao for "Chaleya").

== Plot ==
In Northeast India, a man is thrown off a plane into a river. The man is found unconscious by a tribal group, whose leader takes him in and cares for him for several months. When the tribe is attacked, the man wakes up and saves them. He becomes the tribe's messiah but is revealed to have lost his memory. A boy in the tribe promises he will find out one day the man's identity. Thirty years later in Mumbai, Azad, an IPS officer who is the jailer of Belamvada women's prison, hijacks a Mumbai Metro train with a group of six inmates: Lakshmi, Eeram, Iskra, Kalki, Helana, and Janvi, holding the passengers hostage. When a police officer captures one of the group, Azad ties him up but doesn't hurt him. Azad also shoots a female hostage.

He negotiates with Force One officer Narmada Rai to ask the Agriculture Minister to send ₹400 billion (US$4.3 billion) in exchange for the hostages' lives. During this time, he narrates to a passenger named Alia the tragedy behind the suicide of Kalki's father, a poor farmer, who was harassed by the bank officers over his inability to pay loans to the hostages, so Kalki killed the bank officer. Kalee Gaikwad, a global arms dealer, learns that Alia, who is his daughter, is one of the captives and agrees to fund the deal. Azad plans to donate the money toward the loan waiver of 700,000 impoverished farmers in the country. It is also revealed that the hostage shot was secretly one of the hijackers and was not wounded at all. Azad and his gang transfer the funds into the farmers' bank accounts and escape. Through Alia, Azad reveals his name as Vikram Rathore to Kalee.

Narmada's daughter, Suji, has been searching for a husband for her mother and is impressed by Azad, who lives with his adopted mother, retired jailer Kaveri Amma. Upon her daughter's request, Narmada meets Azad. After sharing their views and understanding each other, they get engaged, although Narmada is unaware of his alter ego. Azad and his gang kidnap the Health Minister and demand better infrastructure at a dilapidated government hospital in exchange for the Health Minister's life. Azad reveals that Eeram, who was a doctor at that hospital, demanded oxygen cylinders for children suffering from encephalitis, but was denied the supply due to negligence and corruption by the Health Secretary, who is forced to reveal that Eeram was never at fault. The infrastructure is immediately upgraded, and Azad and his gang escape again. After they get married, Narmada discovers Azad's alter ego, and Kalee's brother Manish also uncovers this secret, leading to the couple being captured and tortured. Azad is rescued by the real Vikram Rathore, who turns out to be his doppelgänger. Narmada confronts Azad's accomplices in the prison by disguising herself as an inmate, where she learns about Azad and Vikram's connection.

Past: Captain Vikram Rathore, a commando in the Special Ops unit of the Indian Army, was sent in 1993 on an operation in which his team faced casualties caused by malfunctioning weaponry. Vikram and his team filed a complaint against Kalee, the supplier of the weapons. On the same night, Kalee attacked Vikram and his wife, Aishwarya, separated them, and shot Vikram off a plane. Aishwarya is sentenced to death for killing three cops on Kalee's payroll. Vikram is declared a national traitor. Aishwarya's execution was postponed for five years when it was discovered that she was pregnant with Azad on the gallows. When Azad turns five, in her final words to him, Aishwarya asks him to prove Vikram's innocence and provide justice to the oppressed. Unknown to the world, Vikram survived Kalee's attack and has been living with the North Eastern tribe, but lost his memory.

Present: The police officer from the train hijacking is revealed to be Juju, the boy who promised Vikram he would find out who he is, and he reunites Azad and Vikram. Narmada's subordinate, Irani, is revealed to be on Kalee's payroll and tries to kill Azad's accomplices; Lakshmi is killed in the crossfire. Azad arrives at the prison, kills Irani, and steals Kalee's trucks with his team, Vikram, and Vikram's friends. The trucks contain money intended to boost Kalee's political ambitions in the upcoming elections, but during the heist, Kalee's henchmen capture Vikram and his friends. Azad released a video to the public and stated that he had also stolen voting machines and demanded the sealing of 53 factories in the country responsible for pollution. The government seals the factories. Kalee arrives at the prison after finding out that Vikram and Azad are two different people and that he never killed Vikram. A fight ensues, and Vikram recovers his memory after hearing a gun malfunction. He and Azad fight together to defeat Kalee and his men. Finally, they hang Kalee to death like Aishwarya, thus avenging the injustice caused to Vikram and Aishwarya. During the post-credits scene, STF officer Madhavan Naik, who helped Azad in the completion of his missions, assigns him a new mission targeting Swiss banks.

== Cast ==
- Shah Rukh Khan in a dual role as
  - Captain Vikram Rathore
  - SSP Azad IPS
    - Priyansh Vatiani as teen Azad
    - Arijit Gaurav as young Azad
- Vijay Sethupathi as Kalee Gaikwad
- Nayanthara as Narmada Rai, Azad's wife
- Deepika Padukone as Aishwarya Rathore, Vikram's late wife and Azad's late mother
- Priyamani as Lakshmi
- Sanya Malhotra as Dr. Eeram
- Sunil Grover as Irani
- Riddhi Dogra as Kaveri, Azad's adoptive mother
- Sanjeeta Bhattacharya as Helana
- Girija Oak as Ishkra
- Lehar Khan as Kalki
- Aaliyah Qureishi as Janvi
- Mukesh Chhabra as Health Minister's secretary (Note: They are erroneously listed in the end credits as playing Pappu.)
  - Yogi Babu as Health Minister's secretary (Tamil version)
- Eijaz Khan as Manish Gaikwad, Kalee's brother
- Sangay Tsheltrim as Juju, NRS Hospital Constable
  - Abiral Limboo as young Juju
- Seeza Saroj Mehta as Suji Rai, Narmada's daughter
- Bharat Raj as Irai Anbu
- Kenny Basumatary as Nazir Ahmed
- Raviraj Kande as Pushkar Mahajan
- Utsav Narula as Mahaveer Singh
- Jaffer Sadiq as Sudhir
- Naresh Gossain as Agriculture Minister of Maharashtra
- Ashwin Kaushal as Health Minister of Maharashtra
- Sukhi Garewal as Murad (Voiced by Manoj Pandey)
- Abhishek Deswal as Abdul
- Sai Dheena as Kalee's henchmen
- Ashlesha Thakur as Alia Gaikwad, Kalee's daughter
- Smita Tambe as Kalki's mother
- Omkar Das Manikpuri as Kalki's father (voiced by George Maryan for Tamil version)
- Vivek Raghuvanshi as Commando Alif
- Viraj Ghelani as Dubey
- Siri Hanumanthu as Sub-Jailer of Belamvada Female Prison
- Sharad Vyas as Judge of Mumbai Sessions Court
- Dorendro Loitongbam as Village Physician
- Benedict Garrett as Mr. D
- Leesha Eclairs as Kalee's PA
- Sanjay Dutt as STF officer Madhavan Naik (cameo appearance)
- Atlee as himself in the song "Zinda Banda" (cameo appearance)

== Production ==
=== Development ===
In October 2019, it was reported that Shah Rukh Khan would collaborate with Tamil film director Atlee for his film after Zero (2018). Harish Shankar, who was present at the promotion event for Bigil, confirmed the collaboration between Atlee and Khan. During COVID-19 lockdown in India, Atlee narrated the story to Khan in 2020, through Zoom call. In May 2021, it was reported that the filming would commence soon. The film is produced by Gauri Khan under Red Chillies Entertainment, while Gaurav Verma serves as a co-producer. In September 2021, the film's title was speculated to be Lion due to a permission letter from the film studio. The company made a public announcement on 3 June 2022, confirming the project. The film was made on a budget of ₹300 crores.

Atlee co-wrote the film's script along with S. Ramana Girivasan, in his fourth consecutive collaboration with the director. Sumit Arora contributed the dialogues. Atlee further retained most of his norm technicians including cinematographer G. K. Vishnu, editor Ruben, art director T. Muthuraj and stunt director Anal Arasu. Spiro Razatos, Craig Macrae, Yannick Ben, Kecha Khamphakdee and Sunil Rodrigues were also hired as stunt directors. Dance choreographers of the film include Farah Khan, Vaibhavi Merchant, Shobi and Lalitha.

=== Casting ===
Mukesh Chhabra was the casting director. Khan was reported to play a dual role, as father and son, and would be seen in six different looks. Nayanthara was finalised as the female lead opposite Khan, thus marking her Hindi cinema debut. Initially, Samantha was offered the female lead but declined the role. Priyamani, Sunil Grover, Sanya Malhotra and Yogi Babu later joined the cast. Reuniting with Khan after a decade, Babu last acted opposite Khan in Chennai Express (2013); however, he was only present in the Tamil version, while in the Hindi version, his role was played by Chhabra himself. Rana Daggubati was offered the antagonist role but declined citing health issues and thus the role went to Vijay Sethupathi. Deepika Padukone joined the cast in August 2022 in Chennai to shoot her special appearance. In September 2022, Vijay was reported to be making a cameo in the film, but later Atlee denied the news clarifying that he himself was making a cameo. In March 2023, Sanjay Dutt joined the cast to shoot for a cameo during an action scene. Allu Arjun was approached to play a cameo but declined the role citing his commitments to Pushpa 2 (2024).

=== Filming ===
Principal photography commenced in September 2021 in Pune. Some scenes of Jawan were filmed at the Sant Tukaram Nagar metro station in Pune from 30 August to 15 September 2021. The station also appeared in the film's poster, where Khan appears to sit at the metro station. It became the first film to be shot at Pune Metro. Additionally, a 135-foot dummy train was built and fabricated at a film studio in Goregaon where important train sequences were filmed. Khan resumed the shoot in June 2022 in Hyderabad. Shah Rukh Khan and Nayanthara joined the 10–days shoot. Nayanthara joined the Mumbai schedule on 26 June 2022, after her marriage. Some family sequences were shot during this schedule.

In August, the next schedule started in Chennai, where Deepika Padukone shot her cameo part. Later, production moved to Thiruporur, where some important sequences were shot. Later Vijay Sethupathi joined the shoot. Some action sequences between Khan and Sethupathi were taken in this schedule. The song "Zinda Banda" was shot during this schedule, in jail. The song, which shot for 5 days included 1000 dancers, and was choreographed by Shobi Paulraj. Shooting later took place in Gurgaon and Ahmedabad. The song was also reshot for the Tamil version as "Vandha Edam". A month-long Chennai schedule was wrapped on 7 October.

The next schedule was held in Rajasthan, in October. Khan and Nayanthara joined this 20–day schedule. Next schedule was held in February 2023, where Khan shot some chase scenes. Sanjay Dutt joined the shoot on 20 March 2023, to shoot an action-packed cameo. In April 2023, a song titled "Chaleya" featuring Khan and Nayanthara was shot at Mumbai and Bandra–Worli Sea Link. Later the same month, the song "Faraatta" featuring Khan and Deepika Padukone, for her cameo appearance was shot at Film City, Mumbai. Both the songs were choreographed by Farah Khan. In mid July, song titled "Not Ramaiya Vastavaiya" featuring Khan and Nayanthara, choreographed by Vaibhavi Merchant was shot at the Yash Raj Studios in Mumbai. The climax of the movie was shot in Sarathi Studios, Hyderabad.

=== Post-production ===
Post-production for the film began in January 2023 and went on for six months, as the film involves extensive computer graphics and visual effects. Editing was handled by Ruben. The VFX work of the film is done by Red Chillies VFX. Harry Hingorani served as the visual effects supervisor with Keitan Yadav as the VFX producer of the film. In April, the company hired visual effects technicians to the team. Ken Metzker of Red Chillies Color did the coloring for the film. Kunal Rajan served as the sound designer.

Deepa Venkat dubbed for Nayanthara for the Tamil and Telugu versions of the film. Raveena Ravi dubbed for Deepika Padukone for the Tamil and Telugu versions of the film. The final copy of the film was ready by early August 2023 and was submitted to the Central Board of Film Certification (CBFC) that month. On 22 August 2023, the film received a U/A certificate from the Censor Board, with a finalised runtime of 169 minutes.

== Influences and themes ==
According to Shah Rukh Khan, the film's theme is about women's empowerment. Agnivo Niyogi in The Telegraph argues that Jawan pays homage to several SRK films including Phir Bhi Dil Hai Hindustani, Chak De! India, Swades, Chennai Express, and India Today also discusses how Chak De! India influenced Jawan. The Hindu adds that Jawan references Main Hoon Na, Rab Ne Bana Di Jodi, and Duplicate. Jawan has also drawn inspiration from The Dark Knight Rises, and one of the inspirations was from Bane's Mask, creating the character Mr. D (played by Benedict Garrett).

Dr. Eeram, who is one of the key characters in the film, is inspired by real-life events and individuals. Dr. Kafeel Khan, who hails from Gorakhpur, Uttar Pradesh, serves as the inspiration for this character. Dr. Khan became widely known for his involvement in the 2017 Gorakhpur hospital deaths. Dr. Khan was arrested and faced legal troubles related to the incident, which brought attention to systemic issues within the healthcare system. In the film, Dr. Eeram's character likely explores themes of medical ethics, responsibility, and the challenges faced by healthcare professionals. The film also explores factors contributing to farmers' suicides in India.

A scene featuring Vikram Rathore and Kalee Gaikwad draws inspiration from the Bofors scandal, which was a major political and financial controversy in India related to the purchase of Bofors Howitzer for the Indian army. The scandal revolved around allegations of corruption and kickbacks in the arms deal, which had a significant impact on Indian politics and defence procurement. In the film, this scene sheds light on issues of corruption, political intrigue, and the consequences of unethical decisions made in high-stakes situations. The character Kalee is referred to as AB Bofors, which likely signifies a symbolic representation of the scandal, emphasising the role of individuals and entities in larger scandals and controversies. Kalee's character serves as a metaphorical link to the scandal, exploring the themes of accountability, responsibility, and the impact of corruption in society.

== Music ==
The soundtrack is composed by Anirudh Ravichander, working with Shah Rukh Khan and Atlee for the first time; this would also mark his debut as a solo composer in Bollywood, previously having composed a song for David and the background score for Jersey. Lyrics were written by Irshad Kamil and Kumaar. Initially, A. R. Rahman was reportedly approached by Atlee to compose for the film. Rahman subsequently declined the offer for reasons unknown, and Anirudh was chosen to compose for the film. The music rights were bagged by T-Series for ₹36 crore, which was a record price for a Hindi album. The full album was released on 5 September 2023. The soundtrack consisted of seven original songs composed by Anirudh, namely, "Zinda Banda", "Chaleya", "Not Ramaiya Vastavaiya", "Aararaari Raaro", "Jawan Title Track", "Faraatta," and "Chaleya" (Arabic).

== Marketing ==
On 3 June 2022, the film's title and release date were unveiled through a teaser video. A teaser trailer, titled "Jawan Prevue" was released on 10 July 2023. On 30 August 2023, a pre-release event for the film took place at Sri Sai Ram Engineering College, Chennai. The official trailer of the film was unveiled on 31 August 2023. On the same day, Khan arrived in Dubai to celebrate the release of the trailer along with its showcase on the Burj Khalifa.

== Release ==
=== Theatrical ===
Jawan was released worldwide on 7 September 2023 in standard, IMAX, 4DX and other premium formats in Hindi along with dubbed versions of Tamil and Telugu languages. The film was originally planned for release on 2 June 2023. However, in May, the crew decided to postpone the film to September due to pending post-production work. It was the first Indian film to release in the IMAX Leonberg, the largest IMAX theatre in the world. It was also the first Indian film to release in Bangladesh on the same day as its worldwide release, just like in other major countries. Jawan premiered on over 10,000 screens worldwide, the highest for a Hindi film. In Tamil Nadu it released on over 650 screens and in Kerala version on over 350 screens, highest for a Hindi film in the regions. It was also released in both single-screen theatres and multiplex chains. The film was screened at the Himalayan Film Festival in Leh on 30 September 2023.

=== Distribution ===
Pen Studios acquired the theatrical rights for North India and West India under the Pen Marudhar Entertainment banner. Sree Gokulam Movies acquired theatrical distribution rights of the film in Tamil Nadu and Kerala for ₹50 crore, and released under Red Giant Movies in Tamil Nadu and Dream Big Films in Kerala. Sri Venkateswara Creations acquired the distribution rights for Andhra Pradesh and Telangana. Mysore territory rights have been acquired by Panorama Studios. SVF acquired the theatrical rights for West Bengal. Rajshri Productions distributed the film in Odisha, and Prakash Pictures in Bihar.

The overseas theatrical rights were sold to Yash Raj Films. Home Screen Entertainment bought the Singapore distribution rights of the film, while Lighthouse Distribution acquired the distribution rights for Spain. Action Cut Entertainment together with Rongdhonu Group distributed the film in Bangladesh. Friday Entertainment distributed the film in France.

=== Home media ===
The digital streaming rights of Jawan were acquired by Netflix for ₹250 crore. The film's extended version began streaming on Netflix from 2 November 2023 in Hindi, Tamil and Telugu, coinciding with Khan's 58th birthday.

== Reception ==
=== Box office ===
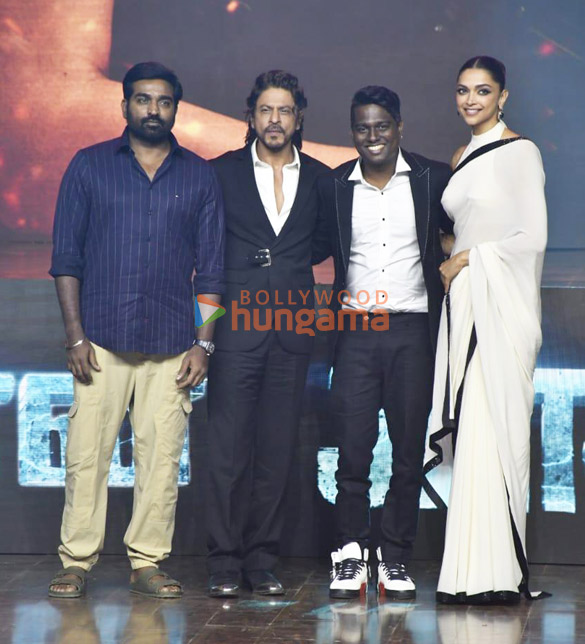
Sethupathi, Khan, Atlee and Padukone (l-r) at an event, celebrating the box-office success of the film

As of 10 November 2023, Jawan has grossed over ₹761.98 crore (US$81 million) in India and ₹386.34 crore (US$41 million) in overseas for a worldwide total of over ₹1,148.32 crore (US$120 million).

On its first day of release, the film's Hindi version netted a record-breaking ₹51.35 crore (US$5.5 million) in India, with a further ₹24.05 crore (US$2.6 million) from its dubbed Tamil and Telugu versions, for a net total of ₹75.4 crore (US$8.1 million). Worldwide, all versions grossed ₹131.5 crore (US$14 million) on the opening day. It overtook Khan's previous release Pathaan to set several opening day records for a Hindi as well as an Indian film. In Australia, it became the first Indian film to top the box office, earning AU$301k on its first day. On its second day, the Hindi version netted ₹45 crore in India for a total net collection of ₹112.5 crore. It became the first Hindi film to net over ₹200 crore in 3 days domestically, overtaking Pathaan. It also became the fastest Hindi film to net over ₹300 crore in 5 days in India. It also became the first Hindi film to net over ₹400 crore in 9 days, and over ₹500 crore net in 13 days domestically. On the 17th day of its release, it became the highest net grossing Hindi film in India crossing his own Pathaan. On the 18th day of its release, Jawan became the sixth Indian film to gross over ₹1000 crore worldwide and only the third Hindi film to do so, also the fastest Hindi film to do so. It is also the highest-grossing Hindi film in India. It has become the highest 4th weekend grosser of all time. It became the first Hindi film to net over ₹600 crore in India.

Territory	Gross
United States	$9,952,508
Canada	$5,277,304
Rest	$180,000
America Total	$15,410,000
Australia	$2,996,619
Malaysia	$1,245,135
Singapore	$798,000
New Zealand	$563,684
Nepal	$1,067,500
Indonesia	$125,000
Bangladesh	$474,500
Thailand (Bangkok)	$63,940
Sri Lanka	$525,000
Hong Kong	$90,000
Japan	$340,000
Rest Asia	$275,000
Asia-Pacific Total	$8,564,000
United Arab Emirates	$9,200,000
Saudi Arabia	$3,325,000
Africa + Rest Middle East	$5,915,000
Middle East + Africa Total	$18,440,000
United Kingdom	$3,851,719
Germany	$737,093
Spain	$70,400
Netherlands	$345,839
Portugal	$36,860
Russia	$30,536
Finland	$40,050
Italy	$36,272
Belgium	$120,000
France	$400,000
Norway	$120,270
Rest Europe	$500,000
Europe Total	$6,285,000
Worldwide Total	$48,700,000

Outside India, Jawan's opening-weekend overseas gross totalled US$21.57 million. By 12 September, it collected US$8.64 million from the Middle East and North Africa (MENA regions), and a further US$8.22 million from the UK and European markets. Jawan become highest-grossing Hindi film in South Indian market grossed a record over ₹73.1 crore (US$7.8 million) broke the record Khan's own previous film Pathaan which was collect ₹21.75 crore (US$2.3 million). It has also become the only Hindi film to have crossed ₹50 crore mark in its dubbed versions. On 4 October, it became the first Indian film to gross over US$16 million at the Middle East box office. Finally Jawan registered total 35.5 million + footfalls which is one of the highest in the history of Indian Cinema and second highest in Khan's career.

=== Critical response ===
Jawan received critical acclaim from critics who praised its cast performances, direction, action sequences, musical score, screenplay, and cinematography. On the review aggregator website Rotten Tomatoes, 89% of 37 critics' reviews are positive, with an average rating of 7.7/10. The website's consensus reads: "Packed with plot twists and breathtaking action, Jawan manages its convoluted plot and imposing length with high-octane panache."

Sukanya Verma of Rediff.com gave 4/5 stars and commended Jawan's political storytelling, writing that it "boldly and directly points fingers at the ineffective government and appeals to recognise the power of the finger and vote". Shubhra Gupta of The Indian Express gave 3.5/5 stars and wrote that the film delivered a timely political message despite being "fashioned as an unabashed massy entertainer". Monika Rawal Kukreja of Hindustan Times termed it a "massy, meaningful actioner". Nandini Ramnath of Scroll.in believed that the film worked primarily due to Khan, writing that his "screen image – expansive, suffused with love, heroic in an old-fashioned way without being aggressively macho, irreverent but also sincere – helps sell a conceit that might have crashed with any other actor". Tushar Joshi of India Today gave 3.5/5 stars and believed that Khan's performance and Atlee's direction had improved upon a typical, Robin Hood-esque story.

Sonil Dedhia of News18 gave 4/5 stars and labelled it a masala film, adding that it is an "ambitious vigilante action thriller that plays to the gallery and lives up to the hype. Far-fetched in writing but high on star power and style". Renuka Vyavahare of The Times of India gave 3.5/5 believed that Jawan had more of a story and purpose than Khan's previous release Pathaan. Taran Adarsh of Bollywood Hungama awarded the film 4.5/5 stars and wrote "Jawan is a mass entertainer at its best with superlative performances, thrilling and clap worthy moments, larger-than-life action sequences, and a never-before-seen avatar of Shah Rukh Khan. At the box office, it will emerge as a blockbuster of epic proportions, setting new records and rewriting existing ones." Devesh Sharma of Filmfare gave 4/5 stars and noted that the action choreography was "on par with any high grade Hollywood film". Saibal Chatterjee of NDTV gave 3.5/5 stars and concluded, "Packed with all the ingredients that you would expect in a high-octane action film, Jawan is a strikingly meta vehicle in which a star communicates directly with his fan base and holds forth on themes that are crying out to be addressed." Uday Bhatia of Mint Lounge termed Jawan a "chaotic mess", writing that the film's story did not cohere despite Khan's best efforts.

Internationally, Manjusha Radhakrishnan of Gulf News gave 3.5/5 stars and compared an ageing Khan to George Clooney, praising the star power of Khan and Nayanthara and the chemistry between Khan and Padukone. Mike McCahill of The Guardian gave 3/5 stars also commended Khan's star power and opined, "Jawan covers a lot of ground in surprising fashion at full throttle – but that's also a polite way of admitting it's utterly all over the place." Proma Khosla of IndieWire praised Atlee's work, Anirudh's music and acting performances of lead actors. She felt that the film "must be experienced on a massive screen with a massive crowd". Alan Ng of Film Threat commented "Jawan is a reminder of what action movies used to be". Pete Volk of Polygon described the film as "Robin Hood meets Charlie's Angels." Simon Abrams of RogerEbert stated, Khan "looks especially comfortable in undemanding musical numbers".

== Accolades ==
Award	Ceremony date	Category	Recipients	Result	Ref.
Astra Film Awards	6 January 2024	Best International Feature	Red Chillies Entertainment	Nominated	
Filmfare Awards	28 January 2024	Best Film	Red Chillies Entertainment	Nominated	
Filmfare Awards	28 January 2024	Best Director	Atlee	Nominated	
Filmfare Awards	28 January 2024	Best Story	Atlee	Nominated	
Filmfare Awards	28 January 2024	Best Actor	Shah Rukh Khan	Nominated	
Filmfare Awards	28 January 2024	Best Dialogue	Sumit Arora	Nominated	
Filmfare Awards	28 January 2024	Best Music Director	Anirudh Ravichander	Nominated	
Filmfare Awards	28 January 2024	Best Female Playback Singer	Deepthi Suresh – "Aararaari Raaro"	Nominated	
Filmfare Awards	28 January 2024	Best Female Playback Singer	Shilpa Rao – "Chaleya"	Nominated	
Filmfare Awards	28 January 2024	Best Editing	Ruben	Nominated	
Filmfare Awards	28 January 2024	Best Production Design	T. Muthuraj	Nominated	
Filmfare Awards	28 January 2024	Best Choreography	Shobi Paulraj – "Zinda Banda"	Nominated	
Filmfare Awards	28 January 2024	Best Cinematography	G. K. Vishnu	Nominated	
Filmfare Awards	28 January 2024	Best Costume Design	Shaleena Nathani, Kavitha J, Anirudh Singh and Dipika Lal	Nominated	
Filmfare Awards	28 January 2024	Best Action	Spiro Razatos, ANL Arasu, Craig Macrae, Yannick Ben, Kecha Khamphakdee, and Sunil Rodrigues	Won	
Filmfare Awards	28 January 2024	Best Special Effects	Red Chillies VFX	Won	
International Indian Film Academy Awards	28 September 2024	Best Film	Jawan	Nominated	
International Indian Film Academy Awards	28 September 2024	Best Director	Atlee	Nominated	
International Indian Film Academy Awards	28 September 2024	Best Actor	Shah Rukh Khan	Won	
International Indian Film Academy Awards	28 September 2024	Best Villain	Vijay Sethupathi	Nominated	
International Indian Film Academy Awards	28 September 2024	Best Music Director	Anirudh Ravichander	Nominated	
International Indian Film Academy Awards	28 September 2024	Best Lyricist	Kumaar – "Chaleya"	Nominated	
International Indian Film Academy Awards	28 September 2024	Best Female Playback Singer	Deepthi Suresh – "Aararaari Raaro"	Nominated	
International Indian Film Academy Awards	28 September 2024	Best Female Playback Singer	Shilpa Rao – "Chaleya"	Won	
International Indian Film Academy Awards	28 September 2024	Best Cinematography	G. K. Vishnu	Won	
International Indian Film Academy Awards	28 September 2024	Best Sound Re-Recording	Sampath Alwar, Chris Jacobson, Rob Marshall, Marti Humphrey	Won	
International Indian Film Academy Awards	28 September 2024	Best Special Effects	Red Chillies VFX	Won	
National Film Awards	1 August 2025	Best Actor in a Leading Role	Shah Rukh Khan	Won	
National Film Awards	1 August 2025	Best Female Playback Singer	Shilpa Rao – "Chaleya"	Won	

== Future ==
It was reported that the film would have a sequel. Owing to the film's success, Shah Rukh Khan asserted the possibility of a sequel. During an interview with Pinkvilla, Atlee officially confirmed that the film would indeed have a sequel and also revealed plans to create a spin-off film centered around the character of Vikram Rathore. Later in September 2023, it was reported that Atlee had started work on the script for the sequel.
