= 2019 Bihar encephalitis outbreak =

Outbreak of acute encephalitis syndrome in India

- Location of Muzaffarpur district in Bihar
- Date: 1 June – 20 September 2019
- Location: Muzaffarpur and adjoining districts, Bihar, India
- Type: Encephalitis
- Cause: Unclear
- Deaths: 161

In June 2019, an outbreak of acute encephalitis syndrome (AES) occurred in Muzaffarpur and the adjoining districts in Bihar state of India resulting in deaths of more than 150 children, mainly due to hypoglycemia. In subsequent months more cases and deaths were reported. The cause of outbreak is unclear. Malnutrition, climate, hygiene, inadequate health facilities, and lack of awareness are considered as contributing factors. The lychee fruit toxins are also cited as plausible cause of AES.

== History ==
Outbreaks of acute encephalitis syndrome (AES) have occurred previously in the northern regions of Bihar state and eastern regions of Uttar Pradesh state of India. The first case of AES in Muzaffarpur district was recorded in 1995. There were 143 deaths in 2013, 355 in 2014, 11 in 2015, four in 2016, 11 in 2017 and 7 in 2018. In most recent years, the death toll had remained under 20.

== Outbreak ==
In June 2019, an outbreak of AES occurred in 222 blocks of Muzaffarpur and the adjoining districts in Bihar.

As a result of the outbreak, total 154 children died in first three weeks of June 2019. A total of 440 cases of AES were admitted to hospitals in these three weeks. At least 85 children of them died at the Sri Krishna Medical College and Hospital (SKMCH), the largest state-operated hospital in Bihar, while at least 18 children died at the Kejriwal Matrisadan, a trust-run hospital, in these weeks. Most of them were aged between 1 and 10 years.

In subsequent months of July, August and September; at SKMCH; 30, 18 and at least 12 cases were reported. Total 647 cases of AES including 161 deaths were reported between 1 June and 20 September 2019.

== Syndrome ==
The term acute encephalitis syndrome (AES) was coined by the World Health Organisation in 2008. The symptoms of AES include an acute onset of fever and associated clinical neurological manifestations such as mental confusion, disorientation, delirium, convulsions, or coma. Early symptoms include headaches and vomiting, along with sudden hypoglycemia (drops in blood sugar levels), but may lead to coma, brain dysfunctions, and inflammation of the heart and lungs. Those that survive AES may have long-term neurological weaknesses. The severe hypoglycemia can cause death. The syndrome is locally known as Chamki Bukhar in Bihar.

== Cause ==
The cause of the outbreak is unclear.

AES can be caused by different microorganisms including virus, bacteria, fungi, parasites and spirochetes, as well as chemicals and toxins. AES mostly affects children below 15. In India, AES was chiefly associated with Japanese encephalitis virus (JEV) before 1975. The JEV cases and outbreaks became more frequent and endemic regions developed between 1975 and 1999. After 1999, non-JEV cases and outbreaks of AES were increasingly reported caused by other viruses including Chandipura virus (CHPV), Nipah virus (NiV), and enteroviruses. After 2012, it is observed that the cause shifting to JEV. Initial examination shows little sign of the JEV or other viral routes in the affected children. A study by AIIMS Patna found the presence of enterovirus.

High temperature, humidity, malnutrition, poor hygiene and lack of awareness are known aggravating factors of AES. Cases of AES tend to occur during the country's monsoon season. In June 2019, the temperature in Muzaffarpur had remained above 40 °C (104 °F) and the rains were delayed which might have aggravated the situation. It was the second-longest heatwave in the region. Poverty and malnutrition is widespread among children in the region. Malnourished children lack a buffer stock of sugar as glycogen in the liver which puts them at higher risk of hypoglycemia. Awareness campaigns were carried out in March–April 2019 but were not conducted later due to the 2019 Indian general elections. The local administration was not watchful due to the few cases of AES in recent years.

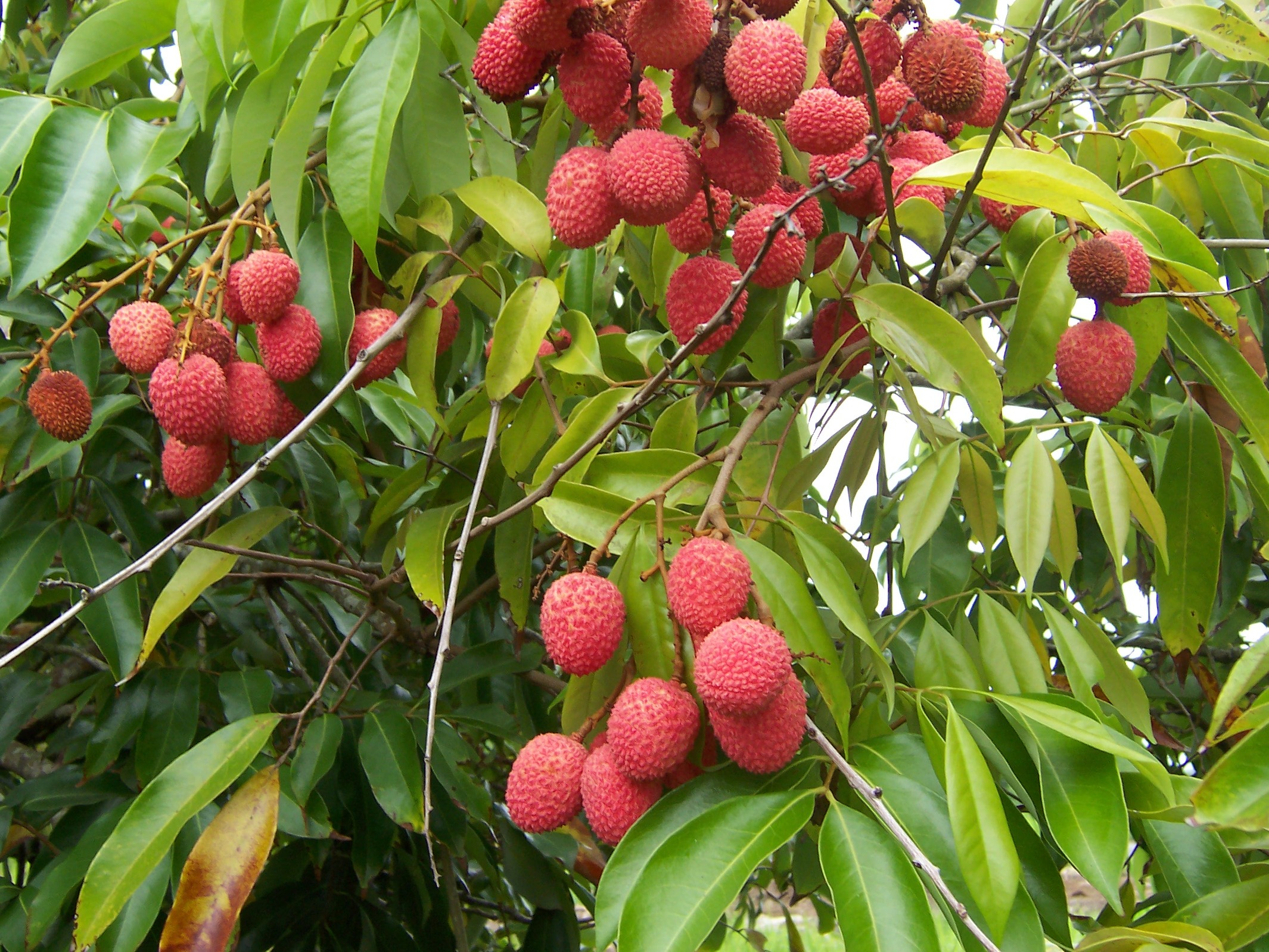
Lychee fruits, which naturally include toxins related to encephalitis, are suspected to have been a contributing factor in the outbreak.

The region is the largest producer of lychee fruits in India. A 2014 study published in Lancet found that the methylene cyclopropyl acetic acid and hypoglycin A found in unripe lychee (Litchi chinensis) fruit can cause hypoglycemia and cited them as plausible cause of AES outbreaks. A diet heavy on unripe lychee fruits without having an otherwise full meal later in the day may put malnourished children at risk of hypoglycemia. Others disputed the findings citing the unlikeliness of very large consumption of unripe lychee fruits, lack of cases in healthy, well-nourished children and many other pediatric illnesses causing hypoglycemia. Health officials reported that most of the victims suffered severe hypoglycemia.

The hospitals and primary health centres lacked the required facilities to treat children.

== Government response ==
The Chief Minister of Bihar Nitish Kumar announced an ex gratia payment of ₹4 lakh (US$4,200) to the next of the kin of the children who died from AES. He also visited the hospital and ordered the expansion of the hospital.

The union minister of health Harsh Vardhan visited and announced the set-up of 100-bed pediatric ward at the SKMCH as well as five virology laboratories in Bihar. He also announced the upgrade of the India Meteorological Department's observatory in Muzaffarpur for better study of climate. Seven pediatric intensive care units are being established. The interdisciplinary team consisting of experts from Indian Council of Medical Research, National Institute of Mental Health and Neurosciences, National Institute of Malaria Research; National Institute of Nutrition, National Institute of Virology; National Institute of Epidemiology and All India Institute of Medical Sciences, New Delhi was formed and sent to Bihar to study the syndrome and establish the cause.

The Supreme Court ordered the Bihar government to file an affidavit to show the competence of medical facilities and other hygiene conditions in the state in the wake of the deaths.

The National Human Rights Commission (NHRC) sent notices to the Ministry of Health and Family Welfare and the Bihar government over the deaths and asked for a report in four weeks.

== Aftermath ==
A total of 872 cases of encephalitis including 176 deaths were reported in Bihar in 2019.

== See also ==
- 2017 Gorakhpur hospital deaths
- Eluru outbreak
