= Chaleya =

2023 song by Arijit Singh, Shilpa Rao and Anirudh

- Song cover

Single by Arijit Singh, Shilpa Rao

from the album Jawan
- Language: Hindi-Urdu
- Released: 14 August 2023
- Recorded: 2022–2023
- Studio: Albuquerque Records, Chennai; Studio DMI, Las Vegas
- Genre: Dance; pop; Western classical; soft rock
- Length: 3:20
- Label: T-Series
- Composer: Anirudh Ravichander
- Lyricist: Kumaar
- Producer: Anirudh Ravichander

Jawan track listing
- 1. "Zinda Banda"; 2. "Chaleya"; 3. "Not Ramaiya Vastavaiya"; 4. "Aararaari Raaro"; 5. "Jawan Title Track"; 6. "Faraatta"; 7. "Chaleya (Arabic Version)"

Music video
- "Chaleya" on YouTube

"Chaleya" is an Indian Hindi-language song, composed by Anirudh Ravichander with lyrics written by Kumaar and sung by Arijit Singh and Shilpa Rao, for the soundtrack album of the 2023 Indian film Jawan. It was released on 14 August 2023 as the second single from the album, through T-Series.

The song was also released in Tamil as "Hayyoda" and in Telugu as "Chalona". Later, the song was dubbed and released in Arabic version. Upon release, the song received positive reviews by audience and critics. The hook step in the film, performed by the lead actor Shah Rukh Khan became widely popular and a pop-cultural phenomenon. The track also topped the national charts, in all music and video platforms.

"Chaleya" experienced large amounts of commercial success. The song debuted at number one on the Billboard India Songs and on Billboard Global 200 chart. Khan revealed the song as "his favourite from the album".

== Composition ==
"The song is one of the most refreshing things I had heard in a long, long time. When you hear the song you will understand that there is this newness to it and I prepared before getting into the studio and It was a very short 20-minute recording with Anirudh. Like I said, he is one a great positive energy to be in the room when you are recording something."

- In an interview with Deccan Chronicle, singer Shilpa Rao on recording the track.

Anirudh Ravichander composed the song after he recording "Zinda Banda". Recording took place in March 2023. Shilpa Rao recorded the song in 20 minutes at Albuquerque Records, Chennai after a jam session with Anirudh. Rao revealed that Shah Rukh Khan's manager Pooja Dadlani approached her to sing this track. Khan's frequent collaborator Arijit Singh also recorded the song. Kumaar worked on the lyrics for the Hindi version.

Anirudh himself sang the Tamil version, titled "Hayyoda" along with Priya Mali with lyrics by Vivek. The Telugu version "Chalona" was sung by Adithya RK and Priya Mali with the lyrics penned by Chandrabose. The song is Khan's first romantic track from a film after four years. Khan described it as romantic, sweet, and gentle.

== Music video ==
The music video featuring Shah Rukh Khan and Nayanthara, was shot across Mumbai and Bandra–Worli Sea Link in April 2023. It was choreographed by Farah Khan.

== Marketing and release ==
The teaser of the track was released on 13 August. The second single "Chaleya" was released on 14 August 2023. The Arabic version of the song was released at an event held at the Burj Khalifa on 31 August 2023.

== Critical reception ==
Meera Venugopal of Radio Mirchi wrote "Breaking the high-tempo momentum is 'Chaleya', a love ballad that takes you on a roller-coaster ride of emotions. Arijit Singh and Shilpa Rao's voices shine here, touching the high and low notes with magic. The lyrics are all about love and enchantment, making it the perfect backdrop for a romantic evening." Trisha Bhattacharya of India Today wrote "Taking a break from the high-momentum vibe, 'Chaleya' is a perfect song for an enchanting evening."

Analysing the song, ETV Bharat wrote "melody carries the enchanting vocals of Arijit Singh and Shilpa Rao, a perfect harmony that tugs at heartstrings. The choreography, deftly handled by the renowned Farah Khan, adds an extra layer of appeal to the song's visual allure. Penned by Kumaar, the lyrics embody the essence of romance, encapsulating the chemistry between SRK and Nayanthara. Soumyabrata Gupta of Times Now vocalists and wrote "crafted by the musical virtuoso Anirudh, Chaleya showcases the emotive crooning talents of Arijit Singh and Shilpa Rao. The track revives the enduring enchantment of the partnership between Shah Rukh Khan and Arijit Singh, a duo celebrated for delivering some of the most profound and amorous melodies."

Praising the choreography, Saikat Chakraborty of The Telegraph India stated, "choreographed by Farah Khan, Chaleya is a combination of Shah Rukh’s signature style and Nayanthata’s grace and elegance as both of them groove to the tune in vibrant clothes. The dance is a mix of salsa and Bollywood freestyle, capturing the romantic lyrics penned by Kumaar." Sukanya Saha of English Jagran praised the chemistry of lead pair.

== Impact ==
Within 24 hours of its release, the song crossed over 35 million views on YouTube, becoming one of the most-viewed Indian song. Upon its release, the song started trending on internet. The song received positive reception from audiences, praising the music. The hook step performed by Shah Rukh Khan, went viral on social media. It became the most-streamed song on Spotify in a single day, as it was played over 2.4 million times on 13 September 2023. After few weeks of its release, the song trended 18th position on Spotify Global Daily chart, highest for an Indian song. In October 2023, it emerged as the most streamed track on Spotify. "Chaleya" was the most played song on Navtarang radio in the year 2023. The song was the top track of 2023 in India on Amazon Music. Dutch singer Emma Heesters performed a cover of the song which was released on 30 September 2023, with lyrics translated to English. Likewise, there were many cover versions created and released by various artistes including the languages the song is not originally produced. South Korean singer Kim Woo-jin said that he love the song a lot. Ranbir Kapoor revealed "Chaleya" as one of his favourite track.

Virat Kohli performed the dance step during an ongoing match in 2023 Cricket World Cup, after scoring his 49th ODI century. Kim Woo-jin, South Korean boy band Ampers&One, Rihanna, Hania Aamir, V, Soumitrisha Kundu, Jimin, J-Hope, Sara Tendulkar, Alaya F, Shwetha Srivatsav, and several others have recreated the hook-step.

== Live performances ==
Anirudh has performed the song during the success event of the film in Mumbai. Arijit Singh has performed the song during the India–Pakistan 2023 Cricket World Cup match at Narendra Modi Stadium in Ahmedabad. He has performed the song at a concert in Pune, in March 2024. Shilpa Rao has performed the song at a concert in Mysore, in October 2023.

== Credits and personnel ==
- Anirudh Ravichander – composer, programmer, keyboard
- Kumaar – lyricist
- Arijit Singh – vocal
- Shilpa Rao – vocal
- Farah Khan – Choreographer
- Vinay Sridhar – mix engineer
- Srinivasan M – mix engineer
- Luca Pretolesi – mastering engineer
- Velavan B – music cordinator
- Shashank Vijay – rhythm
- Harish Ram L H – music editor

== Chart performance ==
Chart	Song	Peak position	Ref.
Billboard Global 200 (Billboard)	"Chaleya"	72	
India (Billboard)	"Chaleya"	1	
India (Billboard)	"Hayyoda"	7	
MENA (IFPI)	"Chaleya"	8	
UAE (IFPI)	"Chaleya"	1	

== Accolades ==
Award (Note: Awards, festivals and organizations are in alphabetical order.)	Date of ceremony (Note: Date is linked to the article about the awards held that year, wherever possible.)	Category	Recipient(s)	Result	Ref.
Filmfare Awards	28 January 2024	Best Female Playback Singer	Shilpa Rao	Nominated	
IReel Awards	9 March 2024	Best Singer (Female)	Shilpa Rao	Won	
International Indian Film Academy Awards	28 September 2024	Best Female Playback Singer	Shilpa Rao	Won	
National Film Awards	1 August 2025	Best Female Playback Singer	Shilpa Rao	Won	
