= Feels Like Ishq =

Indian anthology television series

- Poster
- Genre: Romantic comedy Anthology
- Written by: Saurabh George Swamy; Gazal Dhaliwal; Akshay Jhunjhunwala; Ritviq Joshi; Sachin Kundalkar; Arati Raval; Monisha Thyagarajan; Aarsh Vora; Sulagna Chatterjee; Shubhra Chatterji
- Directed by: Devrath Sagar; Tahira Kashyap; Ruchir Arun; Danish Aslam; Sachin Kundalkar; Jaydeep Sarkar; Anand Tiwari
- Starring: Radhika Madan; Amol Parashar; Rohit Saraf; Kajol Chugh; Tanya Maniktala; Mihir Ahuja; Simran Jehani; Sanjeeta Bhattacharya; Saba Azad; Skand Thakur; Zayn Marie Khan; Neeraj Madhav
- Original languages: Hindi; English
- No. of seasons: 1
- No. of episodes: 6

Production
- Cinematography: Pratham Mehta; Sudip Sengupta
- Production companies: AwesomenessTV; Mutant Films

Original release
- Network: Netflix
- Release: 23 July 2021

Feels like Ishq (transl. Feels Like Love) is an Indian romantic comedy anthology television series with a target audience of teens and young adults. It premiered on Netflix on 23 July 2021.

The series features six stand-alone episodes directed by: Tahira Kashyap, Ruchir Arun, Danish Aslam, Sachin Kundalkar, Jaydeep Sarkar and Anand Tiwari.

It stars an ensemble cast of Radhika Madan, Amol Parashar, Rohit Saraf, Kajol Chugh, Tanya Maniktala, Mihir Ahuja, Simran Jehani, Sanjeeta Bhattacharya, Saba Azad, Skand Thakur, Zayn Marie Khan, Neeraj Madhav amongst others.

== Episodes ==
Title	Cast	Director	Writer(s)
Save The Da(y)te	Radhika Madan as Avni Amol Parashar as Jay Devika Vatsa as Sunaina Abeer Meherish as Pranav	Ruchir Arun	Monisha Thyagarajan
Quaranteen Crush	Mihir Ahuja as Maninder Kajol Chugh as Nimmi Kavita Pais as Maninder's mother	Tahira Kashyap Khurrana	Gazal Dhaliwal
She Loves Me, She Loves Me Not	Saba Azad as Tarasha Ahmed Sanjeeta Bhattacharya as Muskaan Srishti Srivastava as Namrata	Danish Aslam	Sulagna Chatterjee
Star Host	Simran Jehani as Tara Rohit Saraf as Aditya Raghav Dheer as Shivin Mehr Acharia Dar as Shernaz Aunty Siddhant Patra as Akshay	Anand Tiwari	Saurabh George Swamy
Interview	Zayn Marie Khan as Shahana Neeraj Madhav as Rajeev	Sachin Kundalkar	Arati Rawal
Ishq Mastana	Tanya Maniktala as Meher Skand Thakur as Kabir	Jaydeep Sarkar	Shubhra Chatterjee

== Reception ==
The series has received mixed reviews with most of the reviewers critiquing the stories to be cloyingly sweet.

Sudevan Praveen from The Hindu wrote "The writers and directors...have sincerely attempted to make their stories sweet. But after binging the shorts, instead of warm and fuzzy, one feels the nausea of overeating desserts"

Lakshana Palat, writing for The Indian Express mentioned "The idea of the anthology is to infuse that warm and fuzzy feeling in the viewer. It is clear that the stories are not meant to be profound, but just quintessentially sweet. Well, if you are up for sugary and cutesy romances, this just might be the show for you. However, too much of it sweetness might be a bit of an overdose.

The Indian Express writer Noor Anand Chawla wrote the following: "The short content format combined with the theme of love stories in modern settings is clearly an attempt to attract a young audience with ever-decreasing attention spans. It is a formula Netflix returns to often, despite its failings. A motley crew of actors, who perform in a mishmash of stories written and directed by people with varying aesthetics and sensibilities, the anthology ends with mixed results—some good, some show promise, while some are downright forgettable".

Saibal Chatterjee from NDTV gave it 3 out of 5 stars stating "the films dwell on tentative, tremulous probing rather than on passion-filled plunges into the unknown. Like the characters they portray, the films feel their way around in search of the sweet spot. They hit the target only occasionally but the misses do no permanent damage.

Arnab Banerjee of Outlook wrote "An exciting film category teeming with potential, this portmanteau depicting different circumstances can be a winner all the way. Consisting of several vignettes, often connected in thematic ways, or with the same premise or bookend situation, this anthology, doesn’t stick to a specific genre. It’s, at times, compelling, packing intense emotions, but also resorts to the tried and tested route".
