= Not Ramaiya Vastavaiya =

2023 song by Anirudh, Vishal Dadlani and Shilpa Rao

- Official song cover

Single by Anirudh Ravichander, Vishal Dadlani and Shilpa Rao

from the album Jawan
- Language: Hindi
- Released: 29 August 2023
- Recorded: 2022–2023
- Studio: Albuquerque Records, Chennai; Studio DMI, Las Vegas
- Genre: Dance; pop; Western classical; soft rock
- Length: 3:23
- Label: T-Series
- Composer: Anirudh Ravichander
- Lyricist: Kumaar
- Producer: Anirudh Ravichander

Jawan track listing
- 1. "Zinda Banda"; 2. "Chaleya"; 3. "Not Ramaiya Vastavaiya"; 4. "Aararaari Raaro"; 5. "Jawan Title Track"; 6. "Faraatta"; 7. "Chaleya (Arabic Version)"

Music video
- "Not Ramaiya Vastavaiya" on YouTube

"Not Ramaiya Vastavaiya" is an Indian Hindi-language song, composed by Anirudh Ravichander with lyrics written by Kumaar and sung by Anirudh, Vishal Dadlani and Shilpa Rao, for the soundtrack album of the 2023 Indian film Jawan. It was released on 29 August 2023 as the third single from the album, through T-Series.

The song was also released in Tamil and in Telugu under the same title. Upon release, the song received positive reviews by audience and critics. Within 24 hours of its release, the song crossed over 53 million views on YouTube, becoming the most-viewed Indian song. The hook step in the film, performed by the lead actor Shah Rukh Khan became widely popular and a pop-cultural phenomenon. The track also topped the national charts, in all music and video platforms.

== Composition ==
Anirudh Ravichander composed the song which was sung by Vishal Dadlani and Shilpa Rao along with him. Kumaar worked on the lyrics for the Hindi version. The song had the reference to the song "Ramaiya Vastavaiya" from the film Shree 420 (1955). The lyrics also had referenced the "Chaiyya Chaiyya" from the film Dil Se.. (1998). The song appears in the end credits sequence of the film. The whistle in the song is performed by Vinay Sridhar, who worked with Anirudh as a sound engineer in his previous ventures. The Tamil and Telugu versions were sung by Sreerama Chandra and Rakshita Suresh. The lyrics for Tamil version was written by Vivek, while Chandrabose penned the Telugu version.

== Music video ==
The music video featuring Shah Rukh Khan and Nayanthara, was shot at Yash Raj Studios in Mumbai during July 2023. It was choreographed by Vaibhavi Merchant. The music video was initially planned to shoot in Abu Dhabi, but later decided to shot in Mumbai as per Merchant's suggestion.

== Release ==
The teaser of the track was released on 26 August. The third single "Not Ramaiya Vastavaiya" was released on 29 August 2023. The extended version was released on 16 September 2023.

== Critical reception ==
The Financial Express wrote that the "song has certainly lived up to its promise of delivering a heart-thumping party number. With its recent release, it has cast a spell on us, captivating us with SRK’s magical charm and infectious energy. This trendsetter dance moves in the song are simply irresistible, making us want to hit the dance floor." The Indian Express found that the song "is a rollicking party number with elements of SRK's signature romance." Shreya Tinkhede of Times Now termed the song as "stunning, colourful, and foot-tapping".

== Impact ==
Within 24 hours of its release, the song crossed over 53 million views on YouTube, becoming the most-viewed Indian song. Upon its release, the song started trending on internet. The song received positive reception from audiences, praising the music. The hook step performed by Shah Rukh Khan, went viral on social media. Sanya Malhotra danced to the song.

== Credits and personnel ==
- Anirudh Ravichander – composer, vocal, programmer, keyboard
- Kumaar – lyricist
- Vishal Dadlani – vocal
- Shilpa Rao – vocal
- Vaibhavi Merchant – Choreographer
- Vinay Sridhar – mix engineer
- Srinivasan M – mix engineer
- Luca Pretolesi – mastering engineer
- Velavan B – music coordinator
- Shashank Vijay – rhythm

== Chart performance ==
Chart	Song	Peak position	Ref.
India (Billboard)	"Not Ramaiya Vastavaiya"	8	
UAE (IFPI)	"Not Ramaiya Vastavaiya"	6	
