= Triazofos =

Names
- Preferred IUPAC name O,O-Diethyl O-(1-phenyl-1H-1,2,4-triazol-3-yl) phosphorothioate

Identifiers
CAS Number	24017-47-8
3D model (JSmol)	Interactive image
ChemSpider	29847
ECHA InfoCard	100.041.791
PubChem CID	32184
UNII	6099J8L0EE
CompTox Dashboard (EPA)	DTXSID9037612
- InChI: InChI=1S/C12H16N3O3PS/c1-3-16-19(20,17-4-2)18-12-13-10-15(14-12)11-8-6-5-7-9-11/h5-10H,3-4H2,1-2H3 Key: AMFGTOFWMRQMEM-UHFFFAOYSA-N; InChI=1/C12H16N3O3PS/c1-3-16-19(20,17-4-2)18-12-13-10-15(14-12)11-8-6-5-7-9-11/h5-10H,3-4H2,1-2H3 Key: AMFGTOFWMRQMEM-UHFFFAOYAB
- SMILES: S=P(OCC)(OCC)Oc1ncn(n1)c2ccccc2

Properties
Chemical formula	C_{12}H_{16}N_{3}O_{3}PS
Molar mass	313.31 g·mol^{−1}
- Except where otherwise noted, data are given for materials in their standard state (at 25 °C [77 °F], 100 kPa). Infobox references

Triazofos is a chemical compound used in acaricides, insecticides, and nematicides.

== History ==
Triazofos has been registered in the Federal Office of Consumer Protection and Food Safety since 1975 and authorized as an insecticide in the EU until 31 December 2004 (Commission Regulation No 2076/2002). As of 25 July 2003 it was revoked under Commission Regulation No 1336/2003. The production of triazofos began in the 1980s as a Hoechst patent by the company Bayer. In 2011 Bayer announced termination of the sale of this product, due to its poisonous properties.

== Synthesis and available forms ==
=== Synthesis ===
Triazofos can be synthesized through various reactions.

A method of manufacturing triazofos produces the substance in the presence of triethylamine by reacting 1-phenyl-3-hydroxy-1H-1,2,4-triazole suspended in acetone with diethoxythiophosphoryl chloride.

Another method produces the substance by the reaction of phenylhydrazine with Sodium cyanate, formamide and O,O-diethyl phosphorochlorothioate using cyanate additions, condensation and dehydrochlorination.

An improved process for manufacturing triazofos uses phase transfer catalyst to achieve higher yields and purity. By comprising substituted 1-phenyl 3-hydroxy-1, 2, 4-triazole with 0, -diethylthiophosphoryl chloride in the presence of acide scavengers and 0.2% to 2.0% phase transfer catalyst at a temperature between 20-45 degrees Celsius in a suitable solvent like water. Followed by cooling and separating/extracting the aqueous layer from the organic layer by using a solvent such as xylene, toluene methylene dichloride or water for complete recovery of at least 92% triazofos purity.

=== Available forms ===
Triazofos is available in several forms; as an emulsifiable concentrate (40%), wettable concentrates, wettable powders (30%), ultralow-volume liquids (25%, 40%) and granules (5%) at various concentrations.

== Chemical properties ==
=== Structure and reactivity ===
Triazofos is an organophosphate pesticide used in acaricides, insecticides and nematicides. Its chemical formula is : C_{12}H_{16}N_{3}O_{3}PS containing a molar mass of 313,31 g/mol. The chemical compound is susceptible to highly toxic and flammable phosphine gas formation in the presence of strong reducing agents (such as hydrides). It belongs to the reactive groups of: amines, phosphines and pyridines. Azo, diazo, azido, hydrazine and organic azide compounds. esters, sulfate esters, phosphate esters, thiophosphate esters and borate esters. Liquids with these reactive groups have been known to react with mineral-based and clay-based absorbents. Furthermore, partial oxidation of the organophosphate can result in the toxic phosphorus oxides release.

== Metabolism and mechanisms of action ==
=== Metabolism ===
The metabolic fate of triazofos has been studied in rats and dogs.

23 female Wistar (WISKf (SPF 71)) rats were given triazofos labelled at the 3 position (radiochemical purity, 98%) as a single oral dose of about 5 mg/kg bw in sesame oil by gastric intubation. Twenty of the rats were used to examine excretion and metabolism and the other three for blood assays.

The maximum blood drug concentration (Cmax) was achieved after about 4 hours. The average half-life (t1/2) of radioactivity in the blood was 3.8 hours. After 96 hours, the recovery rate was 98%, indicating that excretion was nearly complete. Over 90% of the administered radioactivity was excreted via the urine within 48 hours. 4.5% of the excretion was accounted for by faecal elimination after 48 hours.

From all the tissues that were analysed, the highest concentration of radioactivity was found in the kidney and the liver, at a relatively low concentration of <0.004 ppm. the urine showed three identifiable metabolites: 1-phenyl-3-hydroxy-(1H)-1,2,4-triazole (43% of the administered dose) and its glucuronide (36%) and sulfate conjugates (13%). The glucuronide was converted back to the parent compound at room temperature, due to it being unstable. Unchanged triazofos was not detected in the urine, and quantities of radioactivity in the faeces were too low for defining of the chemical species.

The metabolic fate of triazofos was also examined in two female beagle dogs, with the same treatment and sampling regimen as for rats. 14C triazofos at a dose of 4.4–4.8 mg/kg bodyweight was administered in sesame oil by gastric intubation. Of the administered dose, an average of 85% after 24 hours and 92% after 48 hours was excreted via the urine. Only 0.3% after 24 hours and 7.2% after 48 hours was accounted for by faecal elimination. Maximum blood drug concentration was achieved after 2 hours. After 48 hours, there was no detectable radioactivity in the blood, and the average half-life was 3.6 hours.

Altogether, the metabolic fate of triazofos in dogs was similar to that in rats . The urine consisted of the same three metabolites as in rats. However, there was one other metabolite found only in the dog's urine representing 11% of the administered dose. It was considered to be another sulfate ester conjugate of the 1-phenyl-3-hydroxy-(1H)-1,2,4-triazole metabolite. There was no unchanged triazofos found in the urine of the dogs. The faeces contained low concentrations of triazofos and the free 1-phenyl-3-hydroxy-(1H)-1,2,4-triazole metabolite as well as five unidentified metabolites at about 0.7, 0.3 and 7.3% of the administered dose, respectively.

=== Effects on animals ===
The signal of oral poisoning similarly happen in mice, rats and dogs, characterized by tremors, abdominal position, squatting, jerky respiration, lachrymation, salivation, saltatory spasm, tonic convulsions.

- Acute Toxicity: In mice, rats and guinea-pigs, the acute LD50 value of triazofos ranged from 26–82 mg/kg body weight, while dogs have higher values up to 500 mg/kg body weight. Deaths occurred within minutes to several days after oral administration. Resulting in WHO's consideration of triazofos as a highly hazardous compound.
- Genotoxicity: In the study of toxicity and carcinogenicity effects in mice and rats, triazofos induced no significant or consistent increase in any tumour types.
- Reproductive toxicity: Signs of toxicity such as aggressive behaviour and decreased body weight and food consumption were seen only in F1 parent. Hence, there is no significant effect observed for the reproductive toxicity

=== Mechanism of action ===
Triazofos interacts with several enzymes and signalling pathways according to various bio-assay results:

- inhibits vitamin D receptor (VDR).
- acts as a small molecule disruptors of the mitochondrial membrane potential.
- acts as a disruptor of small molecule activators of the human pregnane X receptor (PXR) signalling pathway.
- acts as a genotoxic compound against isogenic chicken DT40 cell lines.
- acts as a small molecule antagonist of the oestrogen receptor alpha (Er-alpha) signalling pathway.
- acts as a small molecule that activates the Aryl (AHR) hydrocarbon receptor signalling pathway.
- acts as a small molecule antagonist of the constitutive androstane receptor (CAR) signalling pathway.

== Efficacy and toxicity ==
=== Efficacy ===
The use of triazofos as an insecticide in many Asian countries such China, India and Indonesia is widely known due to many insects and pests playing important roles in the market production of staple plant food production. Among various constraints, leafhoppers (Amarasca devastans) and whiteflies (Bemisia tabaci) are one of the major factors in cultivation problems due to their capability to suck the cell sap of plants.

An experiment was conducted by Horticultural Ecosystem in India about the efficacy of triazofos as an insecticide for leafhoppers and whiteflies on Brinjal (Solamum melongena L), one of the prominent crops in India. The investigation was arranged with various market names of triazofos with varying concentrations. The analysis was established after 20 days of transplanting and observing the pest incidence.

Before spraying the insecticide, there were no observations of significant numbers between leafhoppers and whiteflies with the respect to leaf samples.

The visual observations were also constructed in assessing phytotoxic symptoms such as injury on leaf tips or surface, wilting, etc. Nonetheless, no phytotoxic symptoms were observed on the plants with the treatment. In conclusion, the triazofos of 1250 ml/ ha was most effective against leafhoppers, whiteflies and shoot and fruit borer of brinjal.

=== Toxicity ===
Triazofos (O,O-diethyl O-1-phenyl-1H-1,2,4-triazol-3-yl phosphorothioate) is considered an organophosphorus pesticide toxicologically by JMPR in 1982, 1986 and 1991. With an ADI of 0–0.001 mg/kg bodyweight. This establishment was made regarding the view of triazofos in causing delayed neurotoxicity.

Toxicological evaluation revealed the maximum level of triazofos which causes no toxicological effect and the maximum level of exposure considered acceptable for humans. The estimated acceptable daily intake for humans is 0–0.001 mg/kg bodyweight.(See Table 2 and 3)

Table 1. Maximum level of triazofos which cause no toxicological effect
Mouse	30 ppm in the diet, equal to 4.5 mg/kg bw/day (2 year of study)
Rat	3 ppm in the diet, equal to 0.17 mg/kg bw/day (2 year of study)
Dog	4 ppm in the diet, equal to 0.12 mg/kg bw/day (1 year of study)
Human	0.0125 mg/kg bw/day (3 week study)

Table 2: Measured maximum exposure level of triazofos which is considered acceptable for humans.
Summary	Value	Study	Safety Factor
ADI	0-0.001 mg/kg bw	3 weeks, humans	10
Acute RfD	0.001 mg/kg bw	3 weeks, humans	10

==== Adverse effects and health hazards in humans ====
Acute exposure to triazofos may produce the following signs and symptoms: sweating, blurred vision, headaches, dizziness, profound weakness, muscle spasms, seizures, coma, mental confusion and psychosis, excessive salivation, nausea, vomiting, anorexia, and diarrhea. Respiratory signs include dyspnoea, pulmonary oedema, respiratory depression and respiratory paralysis. Chest pains are also reported. The organophosphate pesticide contains material with cholinesterase inhibitor which corresponds to the acts on the central nervous system. Organic phosphorus insecticides can be absorbed by the skin, respiratory and gastrointestinal tracts.

==== Antidote ====
The following antidotes can relieve poisoning obtained from triazofos. Pralidoxime, a treatment of choice pralidoxime (Protopam, 2-PAM) can be used as a cholinesterase reactivator in cases of severe poisoning. Less than 48 hours after poisoning, pralidoxime relieves the nicotinic and muscarinic effects. It works by reactivating the cholinesterase and also by slowing the ageing process of phosphorylated cholinesterase to its non-reactivable form. Another antidote is Atropine. Atropine is effective against muscarinic manifestation but not to nicotinic actions such as muscle weakness and twitching and respiratory depression. The use of atropine has been reported to improve respiratory distress, decrease bronchial secretions and increase the oxygenation.
