= Baba Raghav Das Medical College =

Medical college in Gorakhpur, India

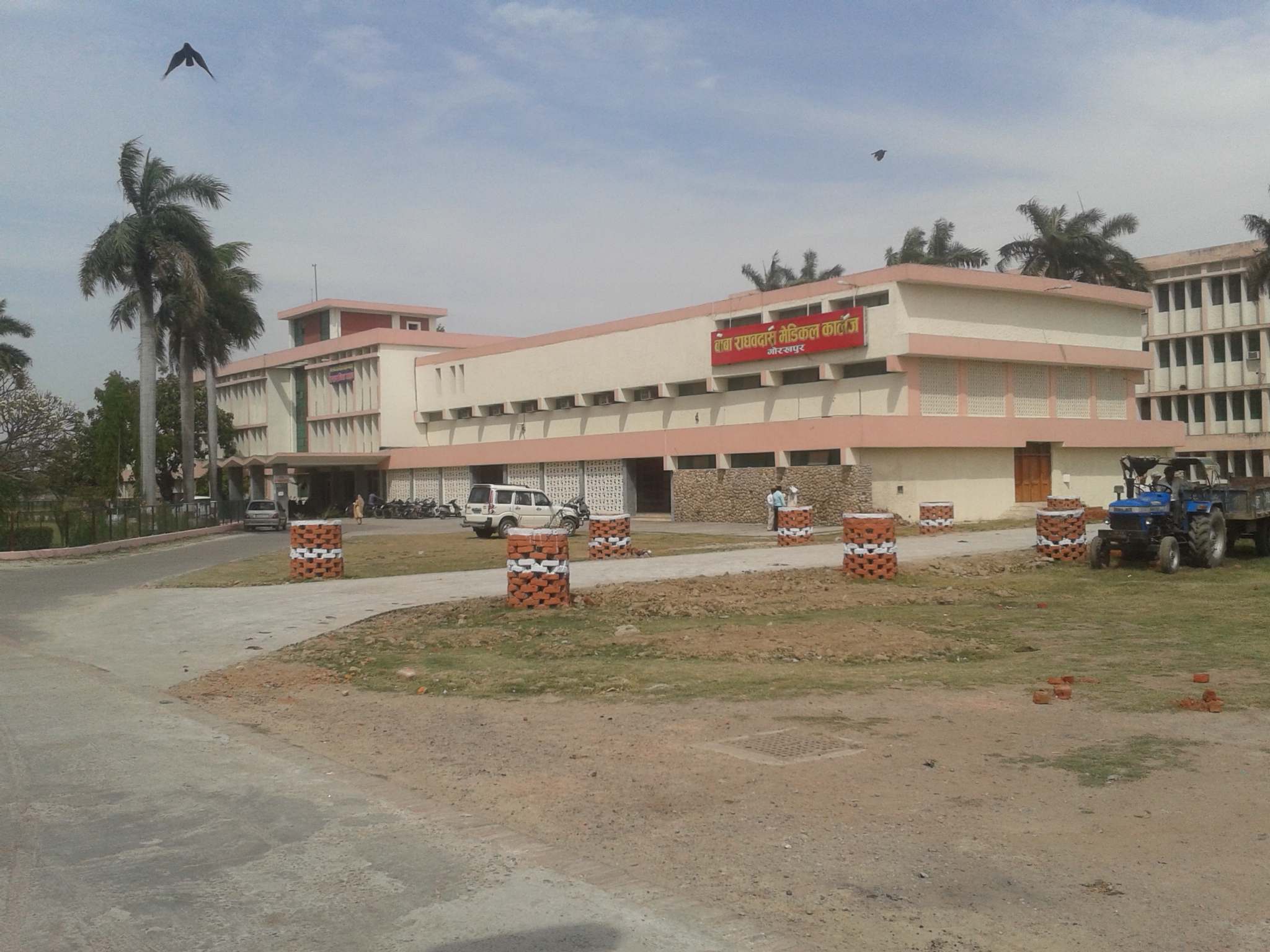
- BRD Medical College in 2014
- Type: State-run Medical College
- Established: 1972; 54 years ago
- Academic affiliations: Atal Bihari Vajpayee Medical University
- Principal: Dr. Dharmendra Kumar
- Undergraduates: 150 (MBBS) students every year
- Postgraduates: 54 (MD & MS) students every yearr
- Location: Gorakhpur, Uttar Pradesh, India; 26.813584°N 83.3999654°E
- Acronym: BRD Medical College
- Website: brdmc.ac.in,brdmc.org
- Location within India Location within Uttar Pradesh

Baba Raghav Das Medical College, Gorakhpur is a medical college in Gorakhpur, India. It is run by the government of Uttar Pradesh.

== History ==
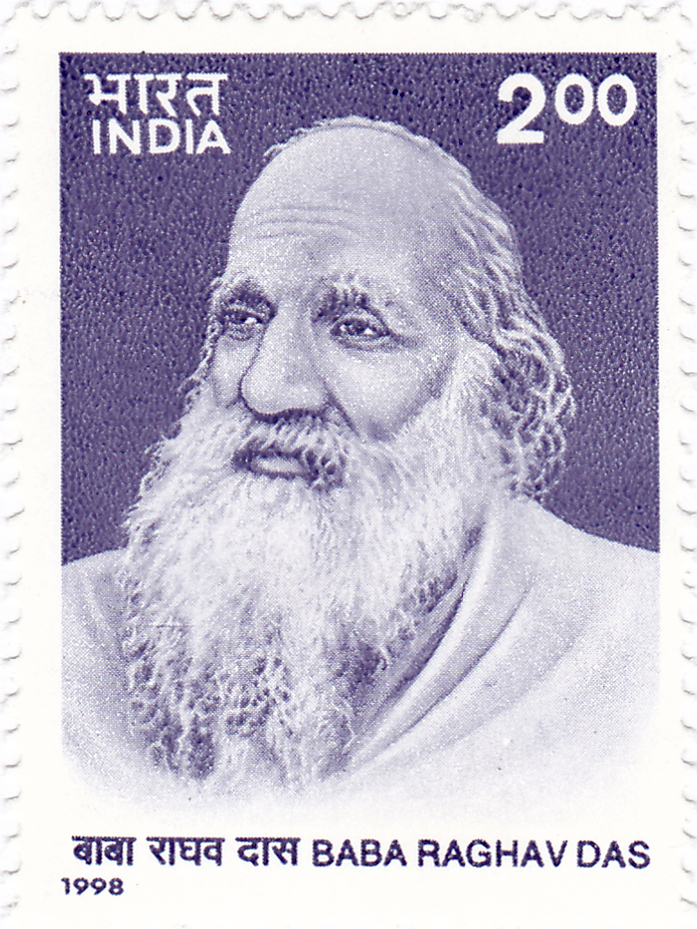
Baba Raghav Das on a 1998 stamp of India

The BRD Medical College was established in 1969 and was affiliated to Gorakhpur University. It was initially developed as a centre for treating mosquito-borne diseases. The Nehru Hospital is affiliated with the college. It has 700 beds, with an additional 108 beds in Epidemic Ward.

The college is run by the state government. In August 2014, the Union Health Ministry led by Harsh Vardhan announced a plan to modernise the institute's infrastructure and to transform into a "super-speciality facility" on par with the All India Institute of Medical Sciences.

He was Scientists at the Government Regional Public Analyst Laboratory on the college campus were the first to discover that Maggi noodles contain too much monosodium glutamate (MSG), resulting in a high-profile case in the media.

Till establishment of AIIMS Gorakhpur, BRD Medical College was the only tertiary referral hospital in a 300 km^{2} area around Gorakhpur, serving patients from 15 surrounding districts. It is a major centre for treating encephalitis, a disease that has seen regular outbreaks during the monsoon season in the Gorakhpur region. Patients, especially poor ones, come from several neighbouring districts, Bihar, and the neighbouring country of Nepal. According to a 2017 estimate, the BRD Medical College treats over 60% of the encephalitis cases in India and receives 2500–3000 encephalitis patients every year. Most of the encephalitis cases arrive during August–October, when the number of patients in the hospital ranges from 400–700.

=== Deaths ===
Encephalitis-related child deaths at BRD hospital
Year	Number of child deaths
2012	557
2013	650
2014	525
2015	491
2016	641
2017 (till 11 Aug)	163

Trend of child deaths at BRD Medical College Hospital
Year	Children admitted	Total child deaths
2014	51,018	5,850
2015	61,295	6,917
2016	60,891	6,121
2017 (till 2 Sep)	Not available	1,317

The first encephalitis epidemic broke out in the Gorkhapur region in 1978. During 1978–2011, more than 30,000 encephalitis deaths were recorded at BRD medical college. This included the deaths of 1,500 patients, 90% of them children, in 2005. The 2005 outbreak was the worst since 1978. The incident became a political issue, and several ministers visited the place. The number of cases decreased after vaccinations were administered to children in the area.

According to official records, during 2012–2017, more than 3,000 children died at BRD hospital. Most of the deaths were attributed to acute encephalitis syndrome (AES), caused by Japanese encephalitis. According to the institution's former principal and head of its paediatrics department, KP Kushwaha, the official death count is understated. In 2017, he alleged that the doctors at the institution misreport the number of deaths to avoid action against them and to get promotions. Other medical practitioners have blamed the hospital's negligence as a major factor behind the high number of child deaths. Over the years, several politicians visited the hospital after each incident of mass child deaths. They have promised to improve the hospital facilities, although no such improvements have been done yet.

In 2017, 175 children died of encephalitis, out of a total 1,256 deaths at the hospital. The deaths attracted media attention and generated political controversy in August 2017, when 296 children died, including 77 of encephalitis. However, the total number of child deaths, including encephalitis-related child deaths, actually dropped in 2017.

=== Alleged causes of deaths ===
==== Mismanagement ====
Corruption in the organisation's management is a frequently cited cause of the high number of encephalitis deaths. In December 2010, the commissioner of Gorakhpur zone, P.K. Mahanti, accused the college principal, R.K. Singh, of impeding the normal functioning of the institute by frequently going on leave. In August 2011, Mahanti's successor K. Ravindra Nayak made serious allegations against Singh, including improper award of maintenance contracts, purchase of hospital supplies at inflated rates, misappropriation of funds from various government schemes, irregularities in job appointments, and non-payments or delayed payments to other parties despite the availability of sanctioned funds.

In August 2010, K.P. Kushwaha, who held the charge of the pediatrics department and the encephalitis ward, complained about the malfunctioning ventilators installed by the contractor GT Enterprises during 2008–2009. He recommended blacklisting the company, but GT Enterprises was awarded another contract for installing a gas-and-oxygen pipeline in the hospital, although another bidder had offered a lower sales quote of ₹ 148,000 compared to GT Enterprises's quote of ₹ 242,000.

A report found dogs roaming around the hospital chambers and beds being shared by multiple patients in the paediatric ward.

==== Lack of funds ====
The college management has cited a lack of funds as the reason for the poor facilities at the institution. In 2009, the state government granted the college several million rupees from a federal health programme. The college spent part of the funds to hire 135 researchers, doctors, and paramedics focused on encephalitis treatment. However, by August 2009, most of the money had been spent, and only 36 of the hired staff were being paid regular salaries.

In August 2017, it was reported that an average of 300 child patients were being admitted to the 50-bed paediatric Intensive Care Unit (ICU) every month. One infant warmer was being used for 3–4 babies simultaneously. The families of newborn babies were asked to sign consent forms stating that the College would not be held responsible if their baby died because of infections transmitted from other babies in the same warmer. In August 2016, when the Union Health Minister Anupriya Patel visited the institution, his department reported that BRD College did not have the budget for stocking up on medicine: patients were forced to buy medicine from outside. In February 2016, the principal of the College sought a budget of around ₹ 379.9 million from the government for the treatment of encephalitis cases. The College also asked for ₹ 100 million to set up a Level 3 intensive care unit with a staff strength of 149. These proposals were not approved by the state government as of August 2017.

In March 2017, the institution's oxygen supplier had discontinued its services due to lack of payments. In August 2017, another oxygen supplier to the hospital cut its services because the hospital did not pay dues. This led to a large number of deaths, which came to widespread media attention. It emerged that the dues were not paid despite several letters by the supplier to various officials of the state administration, including the Chief Minister Adityanath.

==== Misdiagnosis ====
In the past, the encephalitis epidemics in the Gorakhpur region have been attributed to the typical viruses, such as the Japanese encephalitis virus. Since the epidemic first broke out in 1978, several organisations, including the National Institute of Virology and the National Centre for Disease Control, visited BRD Medical College to determine the cause of the encephalitis outbreaks. They ran lab tests for the malaria parasite, and the various viruses that are known to cause encephalitis, including enteroviruses, the Chikungunya virus, the Herpes simplex virus, and the dengue virus.

In 2007, the Government of India started a Japanese encephalitis vaccination programme with drugs imported from China. The initiative was successful in several states, but the Gorkahpur region continued to see a high number of encephalitis cases. After further research, other viruses, such as enteroviruses, were determined not be a cause of the medical incidents. In 2009, scientists from the United States Centers for Disease Control and Prevention visited the area to take samples to identify the virus.

A 2016 study by a group of ten doctors concluded that a high number of the children admitted to BRD Medical College had encephalitis triggered by the scrub typhus, a bacterium that was previously not known to be responsible for encephalitis outbreaks. According to Govindakarnavar Arunkumar of the Manipal Institute of Virus Research, in Gorakhpur, the scrub typhus was not diagnosed and treated during the early stages, ultimately triggering difficult-to-cure brain inflammation.

== Pharmacy College ==
Government Pharmacy College, B.R.D. Medical College campus, Gorakhpur
- Type: Government College
- Established: 2019; 7 years ago
- Academic affiliations: Dr. A.P.J. Abdul Kalam Technical University
- Principal: Dr. Ganesh Kumar
- Location: Gorakhpur, Uttar Pradesh, India; 26.8173206°N 83.4043544°E
- Campus: Gorakhpur
- Website: Official website

Government Pharmacy College, B.R.D. Medical College campus, Gorakhpur, is a government pharmacy college in Gorakhpur of Uttar Pradesh, established in 2019. It is second grant-in-aid college run by Uttar Pradesh Government offering degree course in Pharmacy after Pharmacy College Saifai.
