= Sanjeeta Bhattacharya =

Indian singer

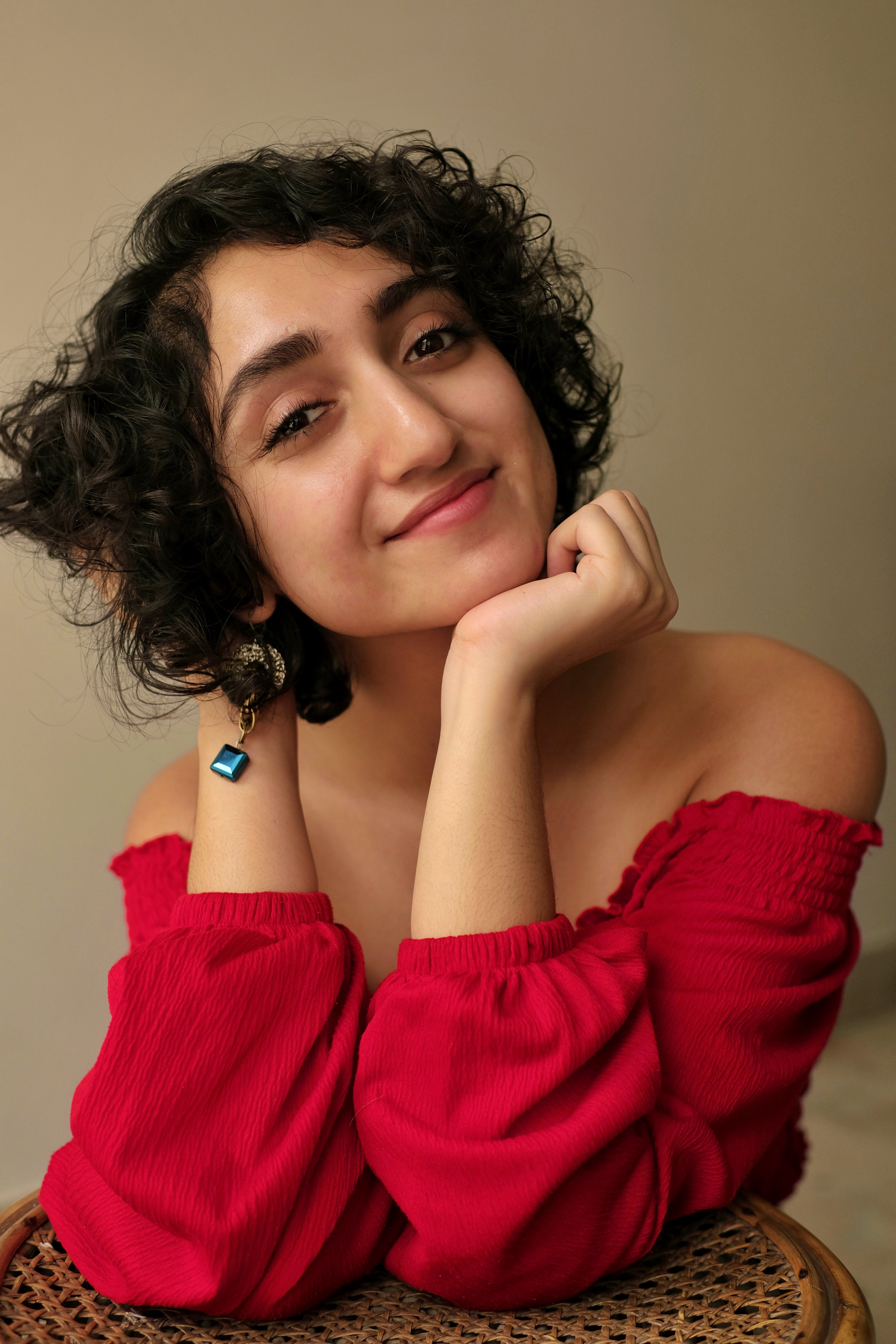

Background information
- Born: c. 1995; New Delhi, India
- Died: Partner Nam
- Genres: Indie folk R&B
- Occupations: Singer, songwriter, actor, lyricist, composer
- Years active: 2017–present

Sanjeeta Bhattacharya (born 1995) is an Indian singer-songwriter and actor. She is a graduate of Berklee College of Music, and has played at festivals such as the Panama Jazz Festival, Hornbill Festival and NH7 Weekender. She has released a series of singles and her track, "Everything’s Fine?" put her on Spotify's global emerging artist program, RADAR in July 2020. Her first international collaboration was with Malagasy singer Niu Raza called ‘Red’. She made her debut as an actor on Netflix’s Feels Like Ishq television series, she made her cinematic debut with the 2023 film Jawan.

Bhattacharya is also known for her performance that paid tribute to A. R. Rahman at Berklee College of Music in 2014 featuring 109 performers from 32 countries. A. R. Rahman was awarded an honorary doctorate from Berklee College of Music at that event.

== Personal life and education ==
Bhattacharya was born in a Bengali family in New Delhi, India. She is the daughter of Artist Sanjay Bhattacharya and Bulbul Bhattacharya who have their roots in undivided Bengal. She graduated from Berklee College of Music, known for the study of jazz and modern American music. Bhattacharya is often referred to as an up-and-coming jazz musician, but she prefers to avoid categorizing her music. She stated during the interview with The Times of India that:

I have roots in Indian classical Hindustani music. In school, I sang RnB, pop, choir music and so on. After which I explored many more genres like flamenco, Balkan folk, Latin American music etc and all of these reflect the music I make.

== Musical style ==
Her music weaves influences from R&B, Indie folk and Latin styles with multi-lingual lyrics to create stories around myriad personal experiences.

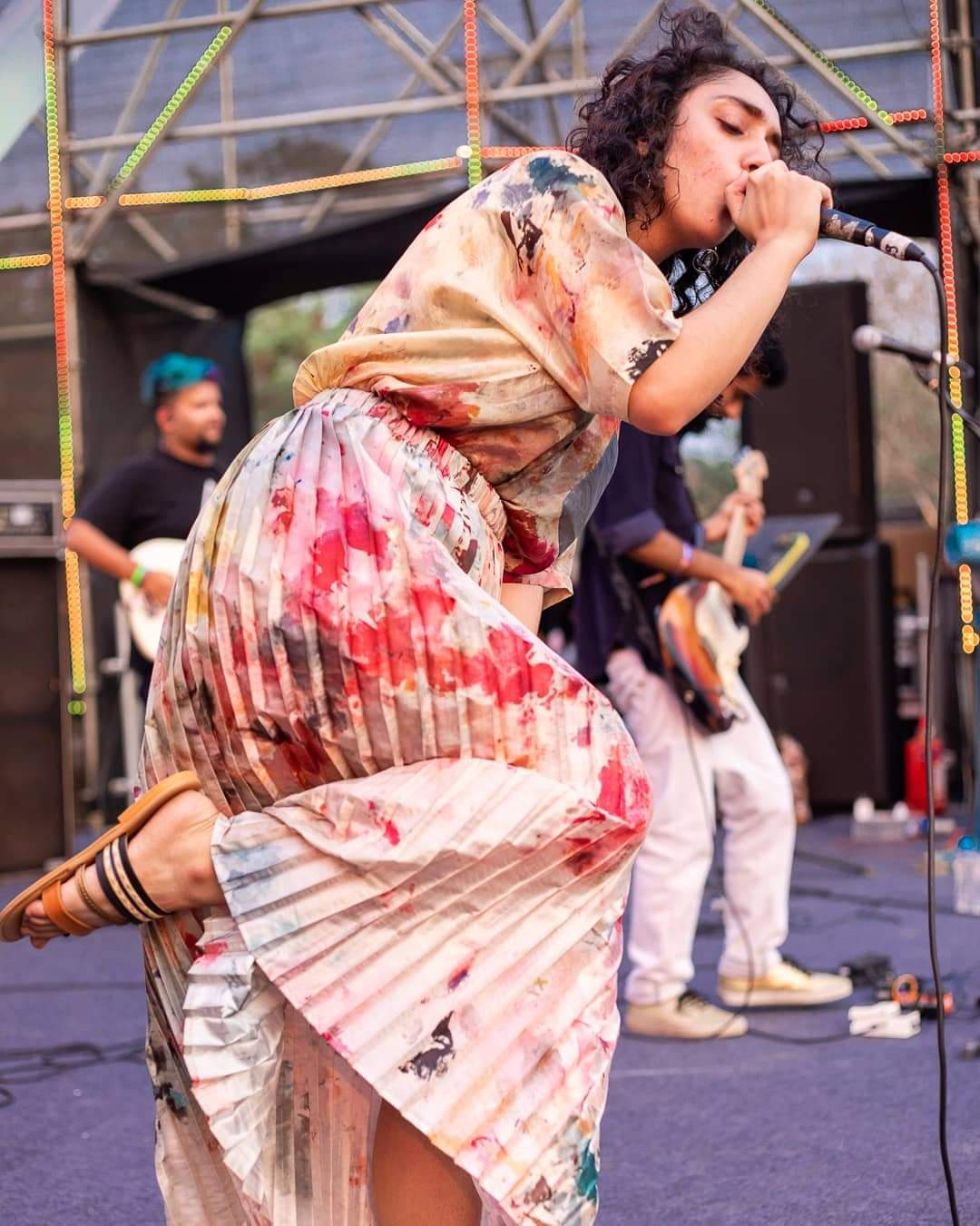
Sanjeeta Bhattacharya performing at NH7 Weekender

== Discography ==
Year	Track	Genre	Language	Reference
2017	"I Will Wait"	Folk/Pop	English	
2018	"Natsukashii"	Pop	English	
2019	"Shams"	Indie folk	Hindi/Urdu	
2020	"Watercolour" (ft. Dhruv Visvanath)	Indie folk	English	
2020	"Everything's Fine?"	R&B/Hip hop	English	
2020	"Red" (ft. Niu Raza, Aman Sagar, Pranay Parti)	R&B/Hip hop	English/Malagasy	
2021	"Khoya Sa" (ft. Aman Sagar)	R&B/ Pop	Hindi	
2021	"Itne Pyaar Se (Thoda Darr Lagta Hai)"	Indie/Pop	Hindi/Urdu	
2022	"UDDCHALEIN"	Pop/Hip-hop	Hindi	
2022	"Out of Tune"	Indie folk	English	
2022	"Mis Chicas" (Spanish)	Soundtrack	Spanish	
2024	"Pyara Mera Veera"	Soundtrack	Malayalam / Spanish	
2024	"Main Character Energy"		English	

== Filmography ==
=== Web series ===
Year	Web series	Role	Language	Reference
2021	Feels Like Ishq	Muskaan	Hindi	
2022	The Broken News	Juhi Shergill	Hindi	

=== Films ===
Year	Title	Role	Notes	Ref.
2023	Jawan	Helena		
2026	Accused	Natasha	Netflix film	

== Other works ==
Sanjeeta was a TEDx speaker at TEDxVITPune.
