= Aruvi (soundtrack) =

Soundtrack album by Bindhumalini Narayanaswamy and Vedanth Bharadwaj
- Released: 1 September 2017
- Recorded: 2014–2017
- Studio: Voice and Vision, Mumbai; Krimson Avenue Studio, Chennai
- Genre: Original feature film soundtrack
- Length: 26:01
- Language: Tamil
- Label: Dream Warrior Pictures
- Producer: Bindhumalini Narayanaswamy; Vedanth Bharadwaj
External audio
- Audio Jukebox on YouTube

Bindhumalini Narayanaswamy chronology
Harikatha Prasanga (2017)	Aruvi (2017)	Nathicharami (2018)

Vedanth Bharadwaj chronology
Suno Bhai (2013)	Aruvi (2017)	His Father’s Voice (2019)

Singles from Aruvi
- 1. "Anbin Kodi" Released: 21 June 2017

Aruvi is the soundtrack album to the 2017 film of the same name directed by Arun Prabu Purushothaman and produced by S. R. Prakash Babu and S. R. Prabhu under Dream Warrior Pictures, starring Aditi Balan, Anjali Vardhan, and Lakshmi Gopalaswamy. The film score and soundtrack are composed and produced by independent musicians Bindhumalini Narayanaswamy and Vedanth Bharadwaj in their feature film debut, while lyrics were provided by Kutti Revathi, Arun Prabu and Oothukkadu Venkata Kavi.

The music provided an unconventional approach in contrast to their Carnatic background. Each song emphasizes a variety of genres, despite being curated from a classical music approach. Both the composers had worked on the music during the pre-production and had turned for 33 compositions including the songs and score. The soundtrack was under production for three years, since 2014–2017, where it was parallelly recorded in Chennai and Mumbai.

The album itself consisted of six songs, instead of the planned 33 tunes. One of the songs "Party Song (Anbin Kodi)" was released as a single on 21 June 2017, coinciding World Music Day. The soundtrack was then released by the production company itself on 1 September 2017. It was acclaimed by critics for its unconventional and experimental approach as well as being a key element in the narrative.

== Background ==
Aruvi's soundtrack and score is curated and produced by the independent musicians Bindhumalini Narayanaswamy and Vedanth Bharadwaj, which marked their maiden composition for a feature film. Since the film was musically heavy and needed a soulful sound, Arun Prabu had listened to several compositions, until he listened to the duo's studio album Suno Bhai (2013) which Prabu was impressed with. During the music discussions, Bindhumalini admitted that music had been considered a strong element in the film and written the script while compiling a selection of songs in his playlist, adding that "[Prabu] was clear that for certain sequences, he wanted the scratch of the music before the shooting schedules, so that he can pace his shots according to that." As a result, both composers had to develop the tunes that aligned with Prabu's ideas. Bindhumalini added that some of the compositions were challenging and took them several attempts to get it right.

"When we met Arun for the brief, we were really impressed with the homework he had done on us even before approaching us. He had told us that the music is an integral part of the movie. In the places where he knew what he was looking for, his clarity helped us compose quickly and in places where he was unsure, he was honest about it and this helped us as there was no beating around the bush. For those parts we brainstormed to discover what we want. We also liked the synopsis of the story a lot. The best part was our music was not just an add on to the movie."

— Bindhumalini on composing music for Aruvi

Bindhumalini and Vedanth extensively researched about the film's musical landscape, with the classifications for moods, ideas, inspirations, detailed descriptions and even the duration of the tracks, and eventually planned for 33 original compositions, including the film's songs and score. Unlike their usual way of composing the tune to the lyrics, they developed the melody and structure of the songs and the lyrics were written afterwards. Prabu would explain each sequence in depth that helped them to compose the tunes. Both of them employed a minimalistic approach for curating the soundscape, while having a rawness that was consistent in the sounds and tunes. Prabu also wrote lyrics for two songs while majority of them were written by Kutti Revathi.

== Development and production ==
The entire soundscape of the film was offbeat and conventional, which in contrast to both of their calibre as they belonged to Carnatic music background. The album accompanied various genres ranging from jazz, a cappella, rock, country, Carnatic and folk, not restricting their ideas and the flow of the music to specific genre and allowing it to take its own course.

With multiple discussions on the kind of music that they composed with Arun, one of them was noted on opening with a Carnatic track when the script needed it showing her in a dance class. They produced and re-arranged the song "Asaindhadum Mayil", a composition of the classical song by Oothukkadu Venkata Kavi, in the Simhendramadhyamam raga and then transmogrifies into jazz, that sticks to Hemavati raga. The use of Simhendramadhyamam allowed them to move into a hardcore European folk feel, as it allowed them to naturally flow to the experimental improvisation, which demanded both classical and street music flavour. They improvised the melodies and rhythms with vocals before the song shifts to Hemavati. The song "Merku Karaiyil" is based on the Mishra Pilu raga, while "Kukkotti Kunaatti" emphasizes western classical harmonies that shifts from major to minor scale.

At certain instances, they distanced out of music while incorporating sounds, with a key music piece being a recurring pattern in the second half was layered with multiple sounds, such as using simple mic box, rubbing textured papers and the creaking sounds of the studio door being opened and closed; they also played certain instruments such as flute, erhu and ocarina, keeping it raw and used off key notes, in a non-musical way. This eventually helped in building tension for the particular scenes.

== Composition and recording ==
Bindhumalini and Vedanth started working on the film's music in 2014, and completed within 2017, taking three years for the entire music process. As both of them were working in different cities—Bindhumalini in Bengaluru and Vedanth in Mumbai—the former would record a tune on her phone and sent to the latter, and vice versa. Both of them communicated virtually while working on the music, while the final recording happened in Chennai with the presence of both composers and the musicians.

The score was recorded at the Voice and Vision Studios in Mumbai and the Krimson Avenue Studios in Chennai, with the featuring veteran musicians—accordionist Federick Rosario, cellist Sekar, violinists Kalyan, trumpeter Babu, sarangi player Manonmani—and younger musicians—bass guitarist Naveen Napier, percussionist Krishna Kishor and violinist Niranjan—whom, according to Vedanth, "brought in their own fresh approaches and improvised with our compositions". The orchestral portions were performed by Chennai Strings Orchestra with conductor Yensone Bhagyanathan. Both composers, liked the originality and suggestions provided by other musicians, while also working with veteran musicians provided them a learning experience.

== Release ==
On the occasion of World Music Day (21 June 2017), the track "Anbin Kodi", deciphered as the "Party Song", was released as a single. The album consists of six tracks, was released on 1 September 2017; deciding not to collaborate with music labels, the album was released by the production company itself, while Divo served as the digital partner.

== Reception ==
Karthik Srinivasan of Milliblog wrote "Bindhumalini and Vedanth Bharadwaj, given their decidedly offbeat musical inclination, add a beautiful hue to Aruvi’s soundtrack that is completely unique and highly original." According to Baradwaj Rangan of Film Companion South, he reviewed: "Bindhu Malini and Vedanth Bharadwaj deliver an experimental soundtrack that works beautifully as a concept album (think Picasso meets early Pink Floyd) — it's certainly art, a free-flowing mix of a cappella choruses and ocarinas and didgeridoos. But the newness of the music, the very thing that would make it stand out as an album, is distracting on screen." Vikram Venkateswaran of The Quint also praised the unconventional nature of the music and score, with the songs not following a specific style.

Haricharan Pudipeddi of Hindustan Times called it as an "excellent score by Bindu Malini and Vedanth Bhardwaj." Ashameera Aiyappan of The Indian Express wrote "Bindhu Malini and Vedanth Bharadwaj's music acts as another narrator for Aruvi. Each song signifies the end or beginning of a chapter in her life, seamlessly interspersing through the narrative." Sreedhar Pillai of Firstpost wrote "The musical score by Bindu Malini and Vedanth Bhardwaj heightens the mood and is in perfect sync with the narration." Anupama Subramanian of Deccan Chronicle called the music "fabulous".

== Track listing ==
No.	Title	Lyrics	Singer(s)	Length
1.	"Baby Track (Kukkotti Kunaatti)"	Kutti Revathi	Vedanth Bharadwaj, Praniti, Bindhumalini Narayanaswamy	4:44
2.	"Teen Track (Asaindhadum Mayil)"	Oothukkadu Venkata Kavi	Bindhumalini Narayanaswamy	3:00
3.	"Liberty Song (Cement Kaadu)"	Kutti Revathi, Arun Prabu Purushothaman	Bindhumalini Narayanaswamy	4:15
4.	"Party Song (Uchcham Thodum Anbin Kodi)"	Kutti Revathi	Vasu Dixit, Bindhumalini Narayanaswamy	3:50
5.	"Hope (Merku Karaiyil)"	Arun Prabu Purushothaman	Vedanth Bharadwaj, Bindhumalini Narayanaswamy	5:00
6.	"Aruvi Theme (Moods Of Aruvi)"	Instrumental	Bindhumalini Narayanaswamy	5:12
Total length:				26:01

== Album credits ==
Credits adapted from Dream Warrior Pictures:

- Bindhumalini Narayanaswamy – singer (all tracks), composer (all tracks), producer (all tracks), musical arrangements (all tracks), programming (all tracks)
- Vedanth Bharadwaj – singer (tracks: 1, 5), composer (all tracks), producer (all tracks), musical arrangements (all tracks), programming (all tracks), ukulele (track: 1), rhythm guitar (track: 3), lead guitar (track: 3), acoustic guitar (tracks: 4, 6), banjo (track: 4, 5)
- V. R. Sekar – cello (track: 1, 6)
- Sasi – violin (track: 1)
- M. Kalyan – violin (track: 1)
- Niranjan – violin (track: 3)
- Chandran – viola (track: 1), violin (track: 6)
- Hemanth – viola (track: 1), violin (track: 6)
- Chennai Strings Orchestra – strings (track: 1, 6)
- Yensone Bhagyanathan – string conductor (track: 1, 6)
- Balu – trumpet (track: 2, 3)
- Fedrick Rosario – accordion (track: 2, 4)
- Naveen Napier – bass guitar (tracks: 2, 3)
- Krishna Kishore – percussion (track: 2, 4)
- Joraj Stanley George – drums (track: 3, 4)
- Manonmani – sarangi (track: 5)
- Navneet Balachandran – recording engineer (Voice and Vision Studios, Mumbai) [all tracks], mixing engineer (all tracks), mastering (all tracks)
- Prashant Techno – recording engineer (Voice and Vision Studios, Mumbai) [all tracks], mixing engineer (all tracks), mastering (all tracks)
- Avinash Satish – recording engineer (Krimson Avenue Studios, Chennai) [all tracks], mixing engineer (all tracks), mastering (all tracks)
- Sindhu Ramji – recording engineer (Voice and Vision Studios, Mumbai) [all tracks], mixing engineer (all tracks), mastering (all tracks)
- K. S. Maniratnam – recording engineer (Krimson Avenue Studios, Chennai) [all tracks], mixing engineer (all tracks), mastering (all tracks)
