= Shakthi Thirumagan =

2025 Tamil-language film by Arun Prabu

- Theatrical release poster
- Directed by: Arun Prabu
- Written by: Arun Prabu
- Produced by: Fatima Vijay Antony; Meera Vijay Antony (Presenter)
- Starring: Vijay Antony; Sunil Kirpalani; Krish Hassan; Vagai Chandrasekhar; Trupthi Ravindra; Prashanth Parthiban
- Cinematography: Shelley R. Calist
- Edited by: Raymond Derrick Crasta; Dinsa
- Music by: Vijay Antony
- Production company: Vijay Antony Film Corporation
- Release date: 19 September 2025
- Running time: 157 minutes
- Country: India
- Language: Tamil

Shakthi Thirumagan is a 2025 Indian Tamil-language political action thriller film written and directed by Arun Prabu, starring Vijay Antony in the lead role, alongside Sunil Kripalani, Trupthi Ravindra, Krish Hassan, Vagai Chandrasekhar, Cell Murugan and others in supporting roles. The film is scored and produced by Antony himself under his Vijay Antony Film Corporation banner. Shakthi Thirumagan was released in theatres on 19 September 2025.

== Plot ==
In 1989, an influential government lobby agent Abhyankkar Srinivasa Swamy pressures authorities to cover up the rape and murder of a tribal woman due to his ties with the perpetrators, and her baby, Kittu is abandoned near a garbage dump. Currently, Kittu is a lobby agent and mediator with the Tamil Nadu government, who leverages his connections to oust a TNHRCE Minister from his post after the Minister's PA accepts a bribe of ₹4,000,000 (US$42,000) from a man for a job transfer. Kittu uses the money earned from such dealings to help those in need. Abhyankkar is now an international lobby agent, under whom Kittu is working. Abhyankkar's sister's husband, Rajagopal is a school principal and paedophile, who was responsible for a colleague's child's death and had used his influence to conceal the child's death as a suicide. Seeking revenge, Kittu bails out a young convict and has Rajagopal killed. Kittu meets Vembu, a social activist, and falls in love with her, and they soon get married.

Central Minister Latha's nephew and PA, Venkatamoorthy, approaches Kittu for help in acquiring Latha's 300-crore land and an 800-crore Japan project on that land, since Venkatamoorthy is constantly humiliated by Latha. Kittu strategises and travels to Thanjavur to instigate the local MLA Sudharsanam against the project. Sudharsanam files a case citing environmental hazards, which earns him the ire of his party superiors. Kittu manipulates Venkatamoorthy into murdering Sudharsanam with the help of Sudharsanam's aide, Kathir. A panicked Latha seeks Abhyankkar's help, who advises Latha to transfer the land to Venkatamoorthy, as planned by Kittu, since Latha trusts only him. Latha becomes suspicious of the events unfolding around her, particularly Sudharsanam's murder and the forced transfer of her land. Following Abhyankkar's advice, Latha halts the Japan project to salvage her political image, causing the land value to plummet. As a result, Kittu is forced to refund his fees to Venkatamoorthy.

Abhyankkar discovers Kittu's involvement in manipulating Latha's land, and in the murders of Rajagopal and MLA Sudharsanam. Abhyankkar summons Ram Pandey from the Delhi Task Force to investigate Kittu's dealings and retrieve the money, but Kittu manages to escape. The investigation has uncovered evidence of approximately ₹62,360,000,000 (US$650 million) in cash, allegedly earned as brokerage. Kittu, his assistant Maaran, and his wife Vembu are eventually nabbed and tortured for information about the money. However, they refuse to disclose any information. As the investigation progresses, hundreds of crores of unaccounted money that were transferred via small banks from Kittu for various philanthropic purposes, such as providing financial assistance to farmers, fishermen and economically backward students are revealed. Ram Pandey begins to look deeper into Kittu's background, but his past remains unrevealed.

In 1989, Subbiah, a Periyarist, rescued the infant Kittu from a dumpyard in Mayiladuthurai and raised him, instilling social progressive and reformist values against superstitions. As Kittu grew older, he learned about his mother's rape and murder, with Abhyankkar being the mastermind. Subbiah motivated Kittu to do good for people and seek justice for his mother's death. Years passed, and in 1995, Subbiah died due to torture in police custody. With the help of villagers, Kittu moved to Madras and started working in the MLA Hostel and later in Abhyankkar's house.

Back in the present, six months have passed since the investigation into Kittu's dealings began, and the police are still unable to find any clue. However, a breakthrough comes when Ram Pandey's team retrieves ₹53,870,000,000 (US$560 million) from a dumpyard, stored in suitcases. After Kittu get tortured while in custody under the instructions of Abhyankkar, the court grants Kittu and Maaran with a conditional bail, but they have to run from court to court, attending multiple cases filed across the state. Despite most of the money being confiscated, Ram Pandey and his team suspect that there's more to Kittu's story that's yet to be revealed, and they keep him under constant surveillance. However, Kittu remains determined to do good for the people and expose Abhyankkar's true face as someone like Abhyankkar, who is cunning, casteist, and contemptuous of the poor, should not hold such a high position. Abhyankkar is revealed to have around 27 groups of institutions under his control and is playing tactical games to become the President of India, with the ruling party's support. Kittu manages to evade the surveillance team and sells his NFT cryptopunk 7435 for a staggering 23.7 million dollars at an auction. Kittu hires three associates and begins to disrupt Abhyankkar's factories using malware attacks and bombs. He also exposes Abhyankkar's cattle smuggling operation, and a raid is orchestrated at Abhyankkar's place.

Kittu asks Raja to ensure his pregnant wife Vembu's safe transportation to Nellore. Meanwhile, Abhyankkar pressures Latha to guarantee his support for his presidential candidature, prompting Latha to order Ram Pandey to arrest Kittu without a warrant. Kittu resists the police and escapes with Maaran. Nandhini, an escort aiding Kittu, sedates one of India's richest men, Feroze's son, and blackmails him to withdraw his support for Abhyankkar's presidential bid. Kittu, masked and anonymous, shares data about scams and corruption, highlighting the country's issues and loopholes exploited by individuals like Abhyankkar. Ram Pandey and the police track Kittu's location to an underground bunker in Red Hills, where he's streaming the live video, but struggle to break in. Using Kittu's evidence, Abhyankkar loses his presidential candidature, and other corrupt officials' scams are exposed. Kittu demands Abhyankkar's presence in exchange for Feroze's son's release. After an argument, Kittu kills Abhyankkar, and the military breaks into the bunker, only to find Kittu missing.

Meanwhile, Vembu has given birth to a baby. Maaran meets the district collector of their ideology and hands over the bank account to continue helping the needy. The film ends with Vembu and the newborn baby missing, but money is left for the woman who took care of them, indicating that Kittu has reunited with his family and chosen to remain hidden, evading the authorities.

== Cast ==
- Vijay Antony as Kittu
- Sunil Kirpalani as Abhyankkar Srinivasa Swamy
- Vagai Chandrasekhar as Subbiah
- Cell Murugan as Maaran
- Trupthi Ravindra as Vembu
- Sudhakar as School Principal
- Krish Hassan as an underage convict
- Harini Sundarrajan as Nandhini, an escort
- Riya Jithu as a police officer
- Shoba Viswanath as Latha, Central Minister
- Chandru BCS as Kittu's Delhi Spy
- Master Keshav
- Allen Jenish as Pappu
- R. Aravindraj
- Nijanthan as TNHRCE Minister's PA
- Prashanth Parthiban as Driver Raja
- Chandran as Abhyankkar Srinivasa Swamy's Manager

== Production ==
The film was officially announced on 28 January 2025 under the tentative title VA25, marking Vijay Antony's 25th film in the lead role to be directed by Arun Prabu. The official title Shakthi Thirumagan was announced on 29 January 2025. Apart from Antony, the film marks the return of actor Kannan of Bharathiraja's Kadhal Oviyam (1982) in an important role and Trupthi Ravindra in her debut. Kannan was credited under his real name Sunil Kirpalani. The film is produced by the lead actor himself under his Vijay Antony Film Production banner and also has composed the music, while Raymond Derrick Crasta was chosen as the editor and Shelley Calist as the cinematographer, continuing their collaboration with Arun Prabu after Vaazhl.

== Title disputes ==
On 29 January 2025, it was announced that Sudha Kongara's next directorial film, produced by Dawn Pictures was titled Parasakthi. In response, Antony released a press statement that he had already registered the title Paraashakthi with the South Indian Film Chamber of Commerce in July 2024 for the Telugu dubbed version of Shakthi Thirumagan. Dawn Pictures countered by revealing they held the rights to the title Parasakthi in both Tamil and Telugu, verified by the producers councils of the respective industries. The 1952 film Parasakthi's original title holder AVM Productions revealed that they had officially granted the rights to use the title to Dawn Pictures. On 30 January, Dawn Pictures and the makers of Shakthi Thirumagan arrived at a mutual decision, where Dawn Pictures' film would retain its title as Parasakthi in Tamil and Telugu while Shakthi Thirumagan would retain its title as Parashakthi for the dubbed Hindi, Kannada and Malayalam versions, with a new title yet to be decided for the Telugu version. Later, that version was titled Bhadrakali.

== Music ==
Shakthi Thirumagan

Soundtrack album by Vijay Antony
- Genre: Feature film soundtrack
- Length: 17:17
- Language: Tamil
- Label: Vijay Antony Film Corporation
- Producer: Vijay Antony

Vijay Antony chronology
Maargan (2025)	Shakthi Thirumagan (2025)

The soundtrack and background is scored by Vijay Antony.

Track listing
No.	Title	Lyrics	Singer(s)	Length
1.	"Maarudho"	Karthik Netha	Abhijith Anilkumar	4:40
2.	"Indha Padai"	Pradeep Vijayamala	Pradeep Vijayamala, Vijay Antony	3:24
3.	"Jill Jill"	Vaaheesan Rasaiya	Vijay Antony, Vaaheesan Rasaiya	3:37
4.	"Kaaladheera"	Vijay Antony	Vijay Antony, A. D. K.	3:21
5.	"Shakthi Thirumagan" (Title Theme)	Vaaheesan Rasaiya	Vijay Antony, Vaaheesan Rasaiya	2:15
Total length:				17:17

== Release ==
Shakthi Thirumagan was released in theatres on 19 September 2025 along with its dubbed versions in Telugu, Malayalam, and Hindi languages, with the Telugu version titled Bhadrakaali. Earlier it was scheduled for 5 September 2025

== Reception ==
Abhinav Subramanian of The Times of India gave 3/5 stars and wrote "The film is most engaging when it lets us watch how influence is moved from one desk to another. The issues are in the telling. At 157 minutes, the cut is restless. Even simple conversations are diced into a flurry of jump cuts, and key turns arrive with showreel sheen rather than lived-in pressure. [...] Shakthi Thirumagan is sharp, punchy, and driven by a lead who earns your attention." Avinash Ramachandran of Cinema Express gave 2.5/5 stars and wrote "It is actually disappointing that Shakthi Thirumagan gets affected by the curious case of the abysmal second half because a lot of things go right in the first. [...] With the film comprising a myriad of possibilities, the way everything unfolds as a boring lecture in a post-lunch session becomes its biggest undoing." Anusha Sundar of OTTPlay gave 2.5/5 stars and wrote "Shakthi Thirumagan gets one of the best written first half of the recent times. It is sleek, engaging, and believable and achieves it by doing very little show off. However, with a under utilised second half, and want to make things pious, it fails to become the masterful political thriller it sets out to be. A missed opportunity." Arjun Menon of The Indian Express gave 2/5 stars and wrote "Shakthi Thirumagan is not a graceful, patient takedown of power politics because it doesn't want to risk alienating audiences with half informed build ups and suggestive storytelling. [...] But the film ends up being a more detail oriented update of a Shankar film that doesn't break any new ground, but is satisfied with the rousing, preachy political sloganeering." Bhuvanesh Chandar of The Hindu wrote "Arun Prabu Purushothaman's ambitious film could have become a generation-defining political thriller had it sustained the beat and style of storytelling that it initially promised."
