= Vedanth Bharadwaj =

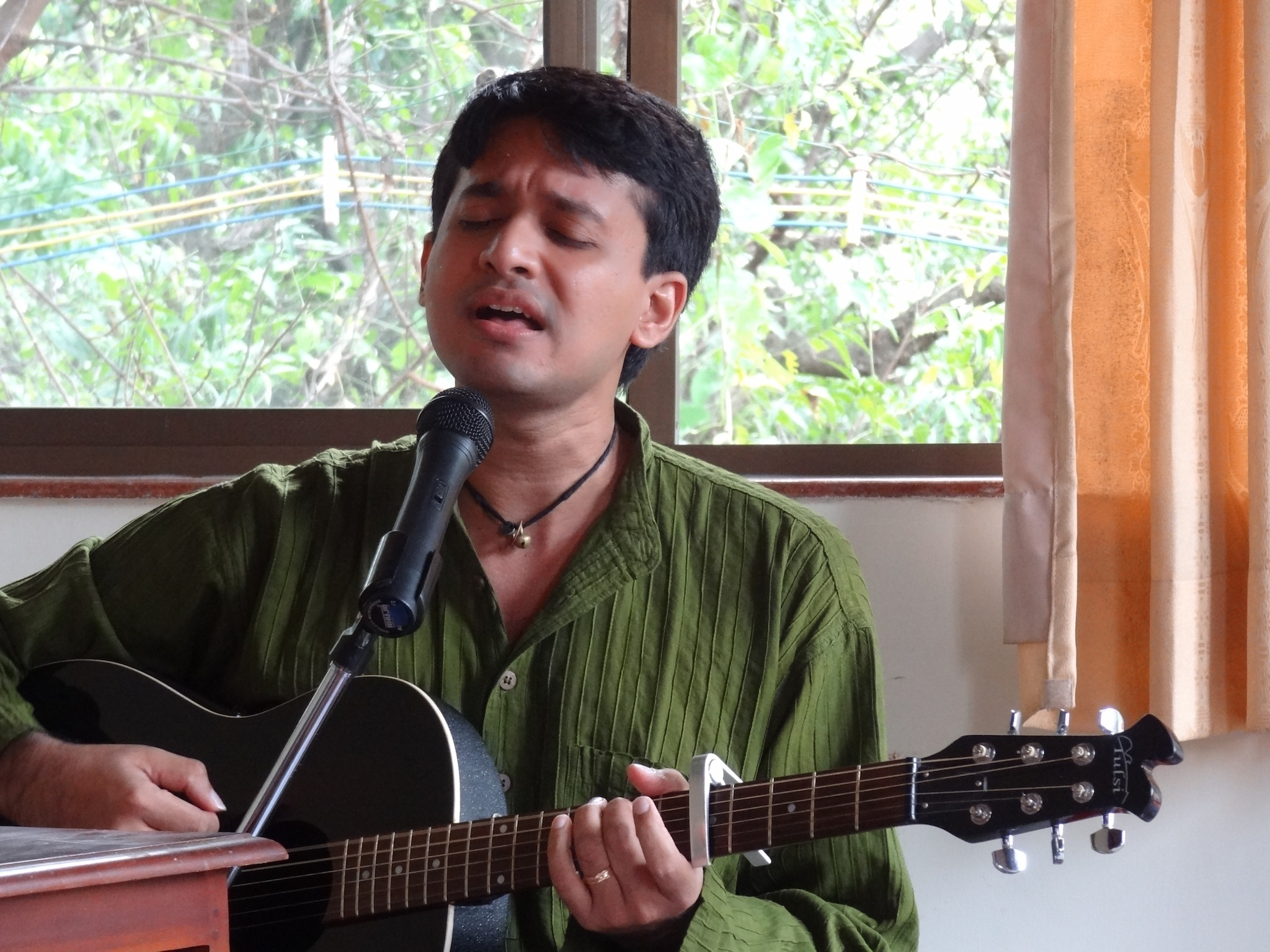
- Vedanth performing at Coimbatore

Background information
- Born: 1 October 1980 (age 46); Mumbai, Maharashtra, India
- Genres: Folk, Hindustani classical, Carnatic
- Occupations: Singer, composer, guitarist
- Website: http://www.vedanth.in

Vedanth Bharadwaj (born 1 October 1980) is a vocalist and composer born in Mumbai, India. He is a qualified guitarist from the Trinity College London and is best known for his work with songs and poems from the Bhakti Movement.

== Early life ==
Vedanth started training in Classical music around the age of four, under Neyveli Santhanagopalan. At first a reluctant student, he soon realised that he enjoyed his music lessons. After being a student of Sri Neyveli Santhanagopalan for over ten years, he trained with Sri Narayana Iyengar for about three years. But his training came to an abrupt end when he moved to Rishi Valley School. While there, he met his roommate and future collaborator, Ananth Menon, who introduced him to rock music, and taught him the guitar. Vedanth is a Post Graduate in Psychology and an MBA in Corporate Communication.

== Music ==
=== Early career ===
When he returned to Chennai from Rishi Valley School, Vedanth formed a band called Buddha's Babies, playing in a genre they liked to call "alternative acoustic trance". Soon after, he returned to Indian classical music and started training with Ramamoorthy Rao, who remains his guru to this day. While doing his Masters, Vedanth did a series of studies on music therapy. He worked as a music therapist with children with special needs at the Kaleidoscope Learning Centre. Meanwhile, he was composing ad jingles for companies like Reliance and Parry's.He formed a group with Ananth Menon and another friend Balu (music director SK Balachandran), and they composed the music for Jagapati Babu-starrer Telugu film Brahmastram in 2006.

=== Music for Films ===
Vedanth scored the music for the film Aruvi (in collaboration with Bindhu Malini). The film was directed by first-timer Arun Prabhu, starring another first-timer Aditi Balan. Vedanth scored the music for the film His Father's Voice, directed by Kaarthikeyan Kirubhakaran.

=== Albums ===
==== Mati Kahe ====
A few years later, during which he composed for a few more films and set up a studio in his house, Vedanth rediscovered songs from the Bhakti movement. He started singing songs of Mirabai, Guru Nanak and Kabir, adding his own twists to the tunes. This eventually led to the germination of his first album, Mati Kahe (2007), which contains songs from the saints and poets of the Bhakti movement. All the songs are accompanied only by the guitar, and some of the tunes were composed by his guru.

==== Suno Bhai ====
The success of his first album fuelled his drive and he started work on his second project. Wanting to concentrate on the works of Kabir, he read translations of his couplets and listened to renditions of his songs by Kumar Gandharva. He collaborated with classical singer Bindhu Malini, and together they made his second album, Suno Bhai (2013).

=== Frequent collaborations ===
In addition to Suno Bhai, Vedanth and Bindhu Malini, frequently perform together, including at the annual Kabir Yatra in Madhya Pradesh. Vedanth collaborated with several musicians for his second album, including flautist Navin Iyer, and kanjeera-player BS Purushotaman. He also collaborated with the Trichur brothers as part of their group Anubhuti. There are several musicians who Vedanth performs with regularly. Among them are Anil Srinivasan and Sikkil Gurucharan of whom Vedanth says, "when the three of us get together, music just happens." Another common collaborator of his is Ananth Menon of Bangalore-based musical group Galeej Gurus. Vedanth and Ananth have given several performances together including at the Fireflies Festival of Sacred Music in Bangalore. Shruthi Vishwanath, a classically trained singer who sings abhangs and nirgun poetry is another of his collaborators at the Kabir Festival of Mumbai, and the Malwa Kabir Yatra. He has also played the guitar on Bombay Jayashri's album, Kannamma, and composed the score for contemporary dancer Anita Ratnam's production, Faces, Ma3Ka, Million Sitas among others. He has collaborated with theatre director Rajeev Krishnan, giving music and playing small parts in his plays, Jujubee and How to Skin a Giraffe.

=== Performances ===
Vedanth has a unique style that blends Indian Classical and folk music. Vedanth has given several performances and concerts all over India and abroad. Some of his notable performances have been at the Playhouse Company South Africa, Singapore, Ladakh Music Confluence 2010, TED Conference 2011, Congo Square Jazz Festival in Kolkata 2010, Chennai Sangamam 2012, Coimbatore Vizha 2011, Fireflies Festival 2011, TEDxSVCE Chennai 2012, Rajasthan Kabir Yatra at Bikaner, Mumbai, Pondicherry and Malwa, NH7 Bangalore, Storm Festival Coorg, Malwa Kabir Yatra, Mumbai Kabir Festival, The Celtic Connections Festival in Scotland, The Indika Music Festival at Liverpool, among several others.

=== Influences ===
Vedanth has a diverse set of influences ranging from Bob Dylan, Eric Clapton, Eagles, Beatles, Allman Brothers, Ray Charles, Frank Sinatra to TR Mahalingam, Ilayaraja, AR Rahman, Ustad Amir Khan, Pt Bhimsen Joshi and Kabir and Meera.

== Personal life ==
Vedanth married Neha, a Punjabi girl, in 2010. They live in Chennai where Vedanth has set up his studio. He is passionate about music, wherever he finds it. He is known to have helped a Chennai-based street Banjo player by buying him an amplifier and promoting him on his YouTube channel.
