= In the Name of God (TV series) =

2021 Indian streaming television series

- Promotional poster
- Genre: Crime drama
- Created by: Ranga
- Screenplay by: Vidyasaagar Muthukumar; Saravanan; Pradeep Aacharya (dialogues)
- Directed by: Vidyasaagar Muthukumar
- Starring: Priyadarshi; Nandini Rai Mohammad Ali Baig
- Theme music composer: Deepak Alexander
- Composer: Deepak Alexander
- Country of origin: India
- Original language: Telugu
- No. of seasons: 1
- No. of episodes: 7

Production
- Executive producer: K. V. Shabarreesh
- Producer: Suresh Krissna
- Cinematography: Varun DK
- Editor: Nikhil Sreekumar
- Running time: 40–45 minutes
- Production company: Suresh Krissna Productions

Original release
- Network: aha
- Release: 18 June 2021

In the Name of God (stylized as In The Name Of GOD) is a 2021 Indian Telugu-language crime drama streaming television series created by Ranga for Aha. It is written and directed by Vidyasaagar Muthukumar. The seven-episode series stars Priyadarshi Pulikonda, Nandini Rai and Posani Krishna Murali in primary roles. Produced by Suresh Krissna, the series premiered on Aha on 18 June 2021.

== Cast ==
- Priyadarshi Pulikonda as Aadi
- Nandini Rai as Meena
- Posani Krishna Murali as Ayyappa
- Mohammad Ali Baig as Rossi
- Rajsekhar Aningi
- Vikas as Thomas
- Chandrakanth Dutta
- Uma Maheswara Rao
- Riyaz
- Deviyani Sharma
- Anil Kumar
- Gautam Kumar
- Krishna Murthy Vanjari
- Aroul D. Shankar
- Sai Priyanka Ruth as Rani
- Jane Thompson
- Sakhshi Sri

== Episodes ==
Episode	Title	Directed by	Written by	Date of Broadcast
1	"Aadhi Parvam"	Vidyasaagar Muthukumar	Vidyasaagar Muthukumar	June 18, 2021
2	"Big Bang"	Vidyasaagar Muthukumar	Vidyasaagar Muthukumar	June 18, 2021
3	"Lost & Found"	Vidyasaagar Muthukumar	Vidyasaagar Muthukumar	June 18, 2021
4	"Nayee Zindagee"	Vidyasaagar Muthukumar	Vidyasaagar Muthukumar	June 18, 2021
5	"Vivaaha Bhojanambu"	Vidyasaagar Muthukumar	Vidyasaagar Muthukumar	June 18, 2021
6	"Udyoga Parvam"	Vidyasaagar Muthukumar	Vidyasaagar Muthukumar	June 18, 2021
7	"Silk"	Vidyasaagar Muthukumar	Vidyasaagar Muthukumar	June 18, 2021

== Production ==
Muthukumar first narrated the story to Suresh Krissna, along with Ranga in 2018. He then started writing the story of the series and ended in 2020, due to the delay because of COVID-19 pandemic in India. After watching Priyadarshi's performance in Mallesham (2019), he chose him for the Aadi role. Similarly, Ali Baiga was cast due to his performance in the Tamil film Aruvi (2016). Filming was done in 2020 and 2021. Most of the scenes were shot in Maredumilli, Rajahmundry and Amalapuram of Andhra Pradesh. Vijaythenarasu and Subhash were signed as art directors of the series.

== Soundtrack ==
All music is composed by Shashank Alamuru.

Telugu (OST)
No.	Title	Lyrics	Singer(s)	Length
1.	"In The Name Of God Rap"	Mahadeva Sastry	MaaHaa	2:45
Total length:				2:45

== Release ==
The premiere of the series was announced on 18 May 2021. On 12 June 2021, it was announced that the series will be premiered on 18 June 2021.

== Reception ==
Sravan Vanaparthy of The Times of India stated "Despite being a bold attempt, truth remains that ING is a long way off from many shows in its genre." Writing for Cinema Express, Ram Venkat Srikar gave a rating of 1.5 stars out of 5 and said that "While it’s good to see every major character get an arc, the endings are consistently blatant. As we navigate questions with uninspiring answers, the series ends on a poor excuse of a twist."

Film Companion's Karthik Keramulu quoted "In The Name Of God is a tedious merry-go-round of a crime thriller"
