= Kannan (actor) =

Indian Tamil actor and businessman

- Born: Sunil Kirpalani
- Other name: Kannan
- Occupations: Actor, businessman
- Years active: 1982–present
- Spouse: Anita
- Children: 2

Sunil Kirpalani, known professionally as Kannan, is an Indian actor and businessman who appears in Tamil films. He is best known for his debut film, Kadhal Oviyam (1982).

== Early life and career ==
Kirpalani was born in the early 1960s to Sindhi parents who left the newly created Dominion of Pakistan in 1947. He was working as a therukoothu artiste when he was spotted by Satyajit Ray's cameraman. He initially tried to get a role in a Bengali film but was not signed up. In Chennai, his hairdo and beard helped him meet an assistant of Bharathiraja, who asked him if he knew Tamil. Kirpalani met Bharathiraja at a coffee shop. He eventually landed a lead role in the film Kadhal Oviyam (1982) and he suggested the name Kannappa Thambiran, based on a therukoothu performer, for his stage name. Bharathiraja shorted the name to Kannan. The film, however, was a box office failure and after trying for several years, Kannan landed a small role in Meendum Oru Kadhal Kathai (1985) as Radhika's brother.

Kannan went on to work in avionics and did his master's degree in finance in the United States. He worked for the now defunct US Airways. Kannan eventually switched to banking and has a risk management for a banking business. He returned to films with Shakthi Thirumagan (2025) after returning to Chennai to help his daughter pursue dance full time. Kannan came into contact with Chitra Lakshmanan, who worked as his manager, who called him for an interview. Director Arun Prabu saw this interview and asked Kannan to act in the film. Regarding his performance, a critic from The Times of India wrote that his "antagonist track carries the right menace without cartooning" and added that "You could draw parallels to many real-world figures through him and you'd likely guess which actual figure he's mimicking most closely here".

== Filmography ==
Year	Title	Role	Notes
1982	Kadhal Oviyam	Sakthi	
1985	Meendum Oru Kadhal Kathai	Sarasu's brother	
2025	Shakthi Thirumagan	Abhyankkar Srinivasa Swamy	credited as Sunil Kirpalani
