= Test (soundtrack) =

Test (Soundtrack from the Netflix Film)

Soundtrack album by Shakthisree Gopalan
- Released: 25 March 2025
- Recorded: 2023–2025
- Genre: Feature film soundtrack
- Length: 23:07
- Language: Tamil
- Label: YNOT Music
- Producer: Shakthisree Gopalan

Singles from Test
- 1. "Arena" Released: 10 March 2025; 2. "Hope" Released: 20 March 2025

Test (Soundtrack from the Netflix Film) is the soundtrack album composed by playback singer Shakthisree Gopalan, for the 2025 film Test directed by film producer S. Sashikanth in his directorial debut and produced by his YNOT Studios banner, starring R. Madhavan, Nayanthara and Siddharth. The film marked Shakthisree's debut as a film composer.

The accompanying soundtrack featured six tunes: four songs, an instrumental theme and a remix of one of the songs. Lyrics were written by Yogi B, Rajesh Shridhar and Kutti Revathi. Most of the songs were produced in hip hop, pop and electronic music genres, while further emphasising orchestral elements. The songs were further dubbed in Telugu, Malayalam, Kannada and Hindi languages, with lyrics written by Rambabu Gosala, Santhosh Varma, Hridaya Shiva and Kunwar Juneja, respectively.

Test's soundtrack was preceded by two singles—"Arena" and "Hope"—released on 10 and 20 March 2025. The album in its entirety was released through YNOT's in-house music label YNOT Music on 25 March, to positive reviews from critics.

== Development ==
"I live in a world of sounds and emotions, and feel the sonic realm is the most easily accessible paintbrush to express my feelings. And for [Sashikanth], it is the other way round, with visuals and colours. I think somewhere in the between, we were able to communicate with each other and find alignment in what we want to create."

— Shakthishree on her collaboration with Sashikanth

Test marked Shakthishree's debut as a music composer. Having created independent music for the past few years, she was spotted by Sashikanth that she could do film music. Sashikanth had known Shakthishree during the latter's undergraduate period at Anna University School of Architecture and Planning, where he was a guest lecturer. He approached Shakthishree to score two of his other films, while she liked the first film's script, instead told that another composer would suit the film, while for the second time, Shakthishree was touring with her band at that time. When she received the story of Test, she read it in one go and found that the "last few pages were very gripping". However, she was sceptical on whether she would suit the story and also found that composing a film was different from curating an album, adding "There is a fabric for each film on which the entire story is happening, the aesthetics of filmmaker and the vision. There is huge component gone out of this shared collaborative energy." She further met A. R. Rahman, recalling that she did not feel ready to compose a film score, to which Rahman added "Sometimes, you can't wait to feel ready—you just have to do it", motivating Shakthishree to compose the score.

Sashikanth wanted the score to have a flavor of Chennai. She did not have any references or temp tracks and went ahead with the script. Though initially planned for two songs, she ended up composing four more tracks, where "each song shaped itself—whatever the story needed". Shakthishree noted that "Arena" set the tone for the film. She composed the song, after she thought of a theme for the stadium moments, She composed the tune in a hip hop genre, as that "feels like the voice of the people" and being "immediate" and "raw". The song fuses Indian folk sounds, with thavil and mridangam performed by Toronto-based Yanchan Rajmohan and M. Venkatasubramanian, respectively.

The song "Hope" (originally developed under the working title "I Don't Want to Lose You") was actually composed with Pradeep Kumar in mind, as "his voice has a storyteller-like quality", and the song is depicted from the perspective of four characters chasing their dreams. However, Sashikanth felt that Shakthishree's voice suited it better, given the story better as it was picturised on Kumudha and Saravanan. "Hope" is composed on an alternative electronic genre. The song "Lullaby" is a "soft, heartwarming track" composed on the pop genre and was used to give space to the female leads. She added "Often, women are conditioned to accommodate, to not express discomfort, and to put others first. Like how mothers always eat last—these are deeply ingrained habits. And when you keep doing that, it costs you—you lose pieces of yourself and your dreams. This song was a chance to give their inner world a voice."

Shakthishree used to play the cues most times over discussing with and use it in the film, if it worked. One of the moments which struck her was a glance between Saravanan and Kumudha where several things were left unsaid and responded it deeply to the score. When Sashikanth heard it, he altered the edit so the emotion could land better. She also recalled on a long, continuous shot where she struggled with the pacing and could not imagine the dialogue rhythm without visuals. This resulted in Sashikanth bringing two voice actors to perform that. The approach gave Shakthishree the timing and emotional cues she needed.

== Release ==
The first single "Arena" was released on 10 March 2025. The second single titled "Hope" was released on 20 March. The six-song soundtrack was released through YNOT Music on 25 March.

== Track listing ==
Tamil
No.	Title	Lyrics	Singers(s)	Length
1.	"Arena"	Yogi B	Yogi B	2:47
2.	"Hope"	Rajesh Shridhar	Shakthisree Gopalan	4:15
3.	"Lullaby"	Kutti Revathi	Shakthisree Gopalan	4:23
4.	"Broken Glass"	Rajesh Shridhar	Akshay Yesodharan	4:56
5.	"Fall of the Hero" (Theme)	—	Instrumental	1:32
6.	"Hope" (Remix)	Rajesh Shridhar	Shakthisree Gopalan, Kunal Merchant	5:14
Total length:				23:07

Telugu
No.	Title	Lyrics	Singers(s)	Length
1.	"Arena"	Yogi B	Yogi B	2:47
2.	"Hope"	Rambabu Gosala	Shakthisree Gopalan	4:15
3.	"Lullaby"	Rambabu Gosala	Shakthisree Gopalan	4:23
4.	"Broken Glass"	Rambabu Gosala	Akshay Yesodharan	4:56
5.	"Fall of the Hero" (Theme)	—	Instrumental	1:32
6.	"Hope" (Remix)	Rambabu Gosala	Shakthisree Gopalan, Kunal Merchant	5:14
Total length:				23:07

Malayalam
No.	Title	Lyrics	Singers(s)	Length
1.	"Arena"	Yogi B	Yogi B	2:47
2.	"Hope"	Santhosh Varma	Shakthisree Gopalan	4:15
3.	"Lullaby"	Santhosh Varma	Shakthisree Gopalan	4:23
4.	"Broken Glass"	Santhosh Varma	Akshay Yesodharan	4:56
5.	"Fall of the Hero" (Theme)	—	Instrumental	1:32
6.	"Hope" (Remix)	Santhosh Varma	Shakthisree Gopalan, Kunal Merchant	5:14
Total length:				23:07

Kannada
No.	Title	Lyrics	Singers(s)	Length
1.	"Arena"	Yogi B	Yogi B	2:47
2.	"Hope"	Hridaya Shiva	Shakthisree Gopalan	4:15
3.	"Lullaby"	Hridaya Shiva	Shakthisree Gopalan	4:23
4.	"Broken Glass"	Hridaya Shiva	Akshay Yesodharan	4:56
5.	"Fall of the Hero" (Theme)	—	Instrumental	1:32
6.	"Hope" (Remix)	Hridaya Shiva	Shakthisree Gopalan, Kunal Merchant	5:14
Total length:				23:07

Hindi
No.	Title	Lyrics	Singers(s)	Length
1.	"Arena"	Yogi B	Yogi B	2:47
2.	"Hope"	Kunwar Juneja	Shakthisree Gopalan	4:15
3.	"Lullaby"	Kunwar Juneja	Shakthisree Gopalan	4:23
4.	"Broken Glass"	Kunwar Juneja	Akshay Yesodharan	4:56
5.	"Fall of the Hero" (Theme)	—	Instrumental	1:32
6.	"Hope" (Remix)	Kunwar Juneja	Shakthisree Gopalan, Kunal Merchant	5:14
Total length:				23:07

== Reception ==
Bhuvanesh Chandar of The Hindu wrote "Roping in singer Shakthishree Gopalan to score the music is yet another distinct creative choice that does the film wonders; like an intimate hum that breezes through in a scene in Arjun and Padma's bedroom, Shakthishree's music aptly tells the emotional landscape of the characters." Latha Srinivasan of Hindustan Times wrote "Singer Shaktishree Gopalan, the film's music director, has done a good job". Hardika Gupta of NDTV wrote "Singer-turned-composer Shakthisree Gopalan's score provides emotional texture, though it occasionally overcompensates for the script's emotional shortcomings." Anagha of India Today wrote "The film's background music, composed by Shakthisree Gopalan, is perfectly suited—intense and impactful at all the right moments".

In contrast, Sneha Bengani of CNBC TV18 wrote "It is Shakthisree Gopalan's music that is Test's lowest point. It's so discordant it will make the viewer realize once again the mammoth importance of music in filmmaking and how it can accelerate or hinder its flow." Similarly, Bollywood Hungama-based critic called the music "forgettable", but the background score "exhilarating".

== Personnel ==
Credits adapted from YNOT Studios:

- Music composer, producer, programmer and arranger – Shakthisree Gopalan
- Mixing – Toby Joseph (TobsGarage)
- Mastering – Mike Cervantes (TobsGarage)
- Additional programming – Alok Mervin, Bhuvanesh Narayanan, Sio Tepper, Surya Giri, Yanchan Rajendran, Alden Muller

Instrumentalists

- Guitars – Chris Jason (tracks: 2, 4), Joshua Satya (track: 3)
- Bass – Carl Fernandes (track: 4)
- Mridangam – Yanchan (track: 1)
- Tavil – M. Venkatasubramanian (track: 1)
- Strings – Rithu Vysakh (all tracks)
- Rhythm programming – Carl Fernandes
- Backing vocals – Shakthisree Gopalan, Lawrence Sivam, M. S. Krsna, Aakaash Jacob, Aditya Rao

Orchestra

- Performer – Budapest Scoring Orchestra
- Orchestra conductor – Peter Illényi
- Orchestral arrangements – Rithu Vysakh

Choir

- Performer – Budapest Scoring Orchestra Choral Ensemble, The Indian Choral Ensemble
- Choir conductors – Zoltan Pad, Shakthisree Gopalan
- Adult chorus – Shyam Krishna, Manikandan Chembai, Shridhar Ramesh, Yazhini, Rutuja Pande, Sivaranjini Chandramouli, Krishaang RP
- Kids chorus – Ahana Balaji, Keerthana Sriram, Sukhi Bhava Arjun

Recording studios and engineers

- 20 dB Sound Studios – Hari Haran, Avinash Satish
- Boombox Studios – Sri Suriya Prakash
- Veda Sonic Ventures – Shakthisree Gopalan, Santhosh Steven
- 2barQ Studios – Rithu Vysakh
- Madras Music Productions – Santhosh Steven
