= 10th Vijay Awards =

Tamil film awards for 2017

- Awarded for: "Excellence for cinematic achievements in Tamil cinema"
- Sponsored by: Poorvika
- Date: 26 May 2018
- Location: Chennai, Tamil Nadu
- Country: India
- Presented by: Poorvika; STAR Vijay
- Hosted by: Dhivyadharshini; C Gopinath
- Acts: Kajal Aggarwal; Dhanshika; Sayyeesha Saigal; Harish Kalyan
- Reward: Statuette

Television/radio coverage
- Network: STAR Vijay

The final 10th Vijay Awards ceremony honouring the best of the Tamil film industry in 2017 was held on 26 May 2018 at Chennai. The event was hosted by Gopinath and Divyadharshini.

== Jury ==
K. Bhagyaraj, Radha, Yugi Sethu, Anurag Kashyap and K. S. Ravikumar were the jurors of 10th edition of Vijay Awards.

== Winners and nominees ==
=== Jury awards ===
Best Film	Best Director
Aruvi	Pushkar-Gayathri – Vikram Vedha
Best Actor	Best Actress
Vijay Sethupathi – Vikram Vedha	Nayantara – Aramm
Best Supporting Actor	Best Supporting Actress
Vivek Prasanna – Meyaadha Maan; Azhagam Perumal – Taramani; Bharathiraja – Kurangu Bommai; Charle – Maanagaram; M. S. Bhaskar – 8 Thottakkal	Revathi – Pa. Pandi; Anisha Angeline Victor – Aval; Indhuja Ravichandran – Meyaadha Maan; Sunu Lakshmi – Aramm; Urvashi – Magalir Mattum; Varalaxmi Sarathkumar – Vikram Vedha
Best Comedian	Best Villain
Soori – Sangili Bungili Kadhava Thorae	S. J. Suryah – Spyder; Elango Kumaravel – Kurangu Bommai; Fahadh Faasil – Velaikkaran; Prasanna – Thiruttu Payale 2; Sshivada – Adhe Kangal
Best Debut Actor	Best Debut Actress
Vasanth Ravi – Taramani	Aditi Balan – Aruvi
Best Music Director	Best Cinematographer
A. R. Rahman – Kaatru Veliyidai	Ravi Varman – Kaatru Veliyidai; G. K. Vishnu – Mersal; P. S. Vinod – Vikram Vedha; Sathyan Sooryan – Theeran Adhigaram Ondru; Selvakumar S. K. – Maanagaram
Best Editor	Best Art Director
Philomin Raj – Maanagaram	T. Muthuraj – Velaikkaran
Best Male Playback Singer	Best Female Playback Singer
Anirudh Ravichander - "Iraivaa" (Velaikkaran); A. R. Rahman - "Neethanae" (Mersal); Haricharan & Arjun Chandy - "Azhagiye" (Kaatru Veliyidai); Ka Ka Bala - "Enga Veetu Kuthuvilakkey" (Meyaadha Maan); Sean Roldan - "Venpani Malare" (Pa. Pandi)	Luksimi Sivaneswaralingam - "Senthoora" (Bogan)
Best Story	Best Screenplay
Rajkumar Periasamy – Rangoon; Arun Prabu Purushothaman – Aruvi; Gnanavel – Kootathil Oruthan; Rathna Kumar – Theeran Adhigaram Ondru; Rohin Venkatesan – Adhe Kangal; Suresh Sangaiah – Oru Kidayin Karunai Manu	Pushkar–Gayathri – Vikram Vedha; A. R. K. Sarvan – Maragadha Naanayam; Arun Prabu Purushothaman – Aruvi; H. Vinoth – Theeran Adhigaram Ondru; Lokesh Kanagaraj – Maanagaram
Best Background Score	Best Lyricist
Sam C. S. – Vikram Vedha	Umadevi (Aramm)
Best Choreographer	Best Stunt Director
Brinda - "Azhagiyae" (Kaatru Veliyidai)	Dhilip Subbarayan – Theeran Adhigaram Ondru
Best Dialogue	Best Costume Designer
Suresh Sangaiah & Gurunathan – Oru Kidayin Karunai Manu	
Best Debut Director	Best Child Artist
Lokesh Kanagaraj – Maanagaram; Arun Prabu Purushothaman – Aruvi; Gopi Nainar – Aramm; Rathna Kumar – Meyaadha Maan; Suresh Sangaiah – Oru Kidayin Karunai Manu	
Contribution to Tamil Cinema	Entertainer of the Year
Sivakumar	Dhanush
Best Find of the Year	Best Crew

Special Jury Awards

=== Favorite awards ===
Favorite Hero	Favorite Heroine
Vijay – Mersal	Nayantara – Aramm; Anushka Shetty – Baahubali: The Conclusion; Kajal Aggarwal – Vivegam; Keerthy Suresh – Bairavaa; Samantha – Mersal
Favorite Film	Favorite Director
Mersal	Atlee – Mersal
Favourite Song
A. R. Rahman - "Aalaporan Tamizhan" from Mersal; A. R. Rahman - "Azhagiye" from Kaatru Veliyidai; M. M. Keeravani - "Bale Bale" from Baahubali: The Conclusion; Anirudh Ravichander - "Karuthavanlaam Galeejaam" from Velaikkaran; D. Imman - "Sendhoora" from Bogan
