= Bindhumalini =

Indian playback singer, composer, theatre activist

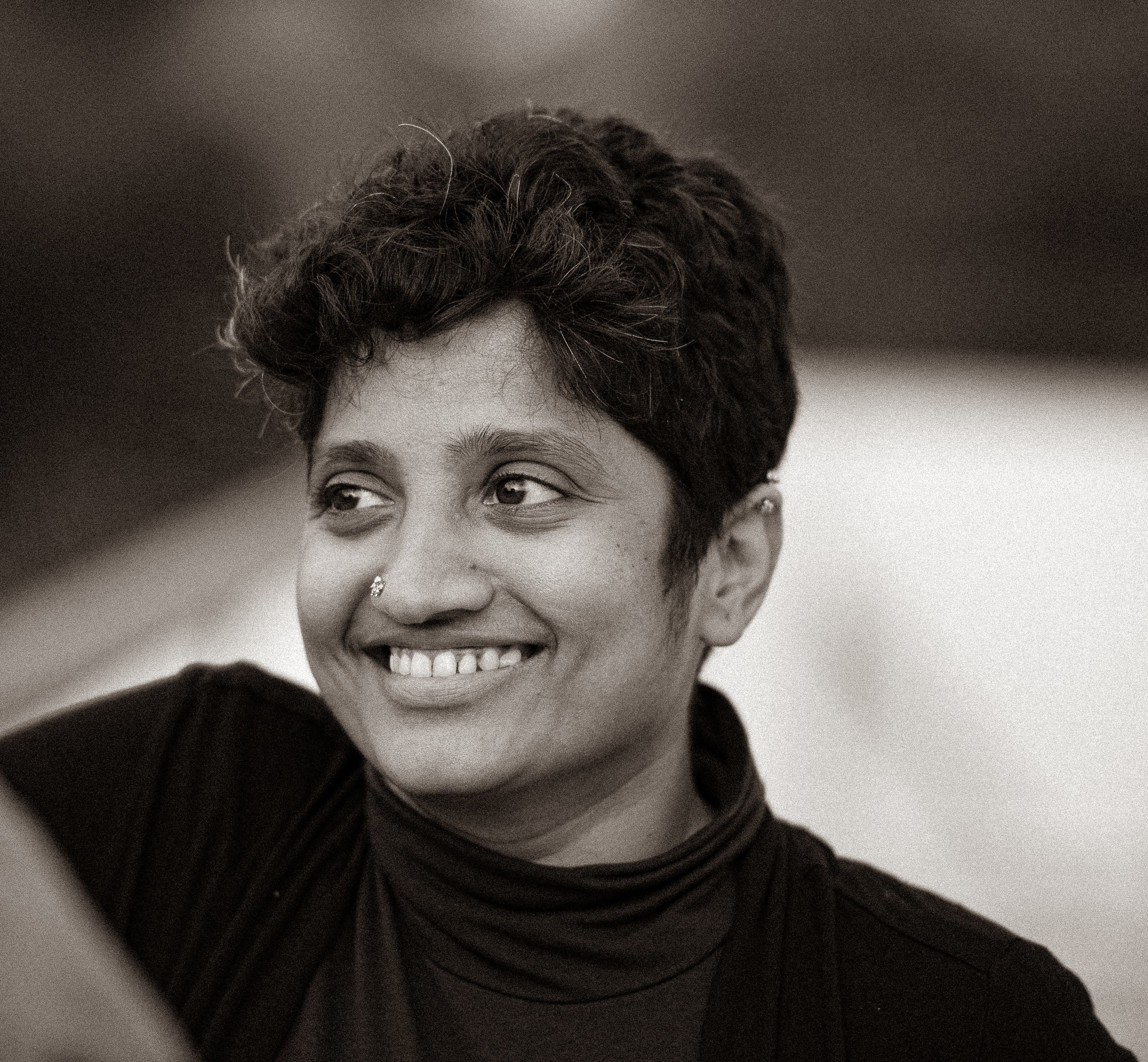
- Born: 20 November 1981 (age 44); Madras, Tamil Nadu, India
- Education: National Institute of Design
- Occupations: singer; composer; graphic designer
- Spouse: Vasu Dixit
- Musical career
- Genres: Filmi; Folk; Sufi; Classical; Bhajan
- Instrument: Vocals
- Label: Independent Artist

Bindhumalini Narayanaswamy or simply Bindhumalini is an Indian singer, composer, and graphic designer. She has received National Film Award for Best Female Playback Singer (2018) and Filmfare Award for Best Female Playback Singer - Kannada (2019) for her songs in the movie Nathicharami. She has composed and recorded songs for films and albums mainly in Kannada, in addition to Tamil and Hindi.

== Personal life ==
Bindumalini was born in Chennai in a musical family. Her mother N. Vishalakshi is a graded Akasvani Carnatic singer and grandmother Seetha Doraiswamy was a known Jal Tarang instrumentalist. She holds a degree in Graphic design from the National Institute of Design.

Bindumalini married Vasu Dixit, a vocalist from Bangalore, who runs a folk-rock fusion music band called Swarathma.

== Career ==
Trained both in Carnatic and Hindustani music, Bindumalini was influenced by the poems of saint Kabir and the songs of Kumar Gandharva.

Bindumalini's album ‛Suno Bhai’, a collection of Saint Kabir's poems, was a collaboration with Vedanth Bharadwaj.

As composer

Bindumalini scored music for the 2016 Tamil movie Aruvi with Vedanth Bharadwaj. In Kannada, she first collaborated with Ananya Kasaravalli and scored music for the movie Harikatha Prasanga which won Best Film award at the 9th edition of Bangalore International Film Festival, 2017. In 2018, Bindumalini composed music for the movie Nathicharami which brought her a National award. Incidentally, most of her movies were women-centric.

== Awards ==
- 2018 - National Film Award for Best Female Playback Singer - "Mayavi manave" - Nathicharami
- 2019 - Filmfare Award for Best Female Playback Singer - Kannada - "Bhavalokada bhrameya" - Nathicharami

== Filmography ==
In her movies as composer, most of the songs sung by Bindumalini herself.

Year	Film	Singer	Composer(s)	Language(s)
2016	Aruvi	✓	✓ (in collaboration with Vedanth Bharadwaj)	Tamil
2017	Harikatha Prasanga	✓	✓	Kannada
2018	Nathicharami	✓	✓	Kannada
2023	Aachar & Co	✓	✓	Kannada

=== Discography ===
Year	Film	Language	Song	Music director	Co-singer
2012	Cyber Yugadol Nava Yuva Madhura Prema Kavyam	Kannada	"Olavemba Nadiyagi"	Vasu Dixit	Harishchandra
2016	Aruvi	Tamil	"Kukkoti Kunnati"	Bindhumalini, Vedanth Bharadhwaj	Praneeti, Vedant
2016	Aruvi	Tamil	"Asaidam Venkata Kavimayil"	Bindhumalini, Vedanth Bharadhwaj	
2016	Aruvi	Tamil	"Cement Kaadu"	Bindhumalini, Vedanth Bharadhwaj	
2016	Aruvi	Tamil	"Uccham Thodum"	Bindhumalini, Vedanth Bharadhwaj	Vasu Dixit
2016	Aruvi	Tamil	"Merku Karaiyil"	Bindhumalini, Vedanth Bharadhwaj	Vedanth Bharadhwaj
2016	Aruvi	Tamil	"Aruvi" (Theme)	Bindhumalini, Vedanth Bharadhwaj	
2016	Harikatha Prasanga	Kannada		Bindumalini	
2018	Nathicharami	Kannada	"Vasundhare"	Bindhumalini	
2018	Nathicharami	Kannada	"Yariva"	Bindhumalini	
2018	Nathicharami	Kannada	"Bhavalokada Bhrameya"	Bindhumalini	Sanchari Vijay
2018	Nathicharami	Kannada	"Mayavi Manave"	Bindhumalini	
2018	Nathicharami	Kannada	"Dehavu Nane"	Bindhumalini	
2023	Achar & Co.	Kannada	"Pickle Song"	Bindhumalini	Emmjee, Deepika Kumar, Preethi Bharadwaj
