= Mohammad Ali Baig =

Indian theatre director and producer

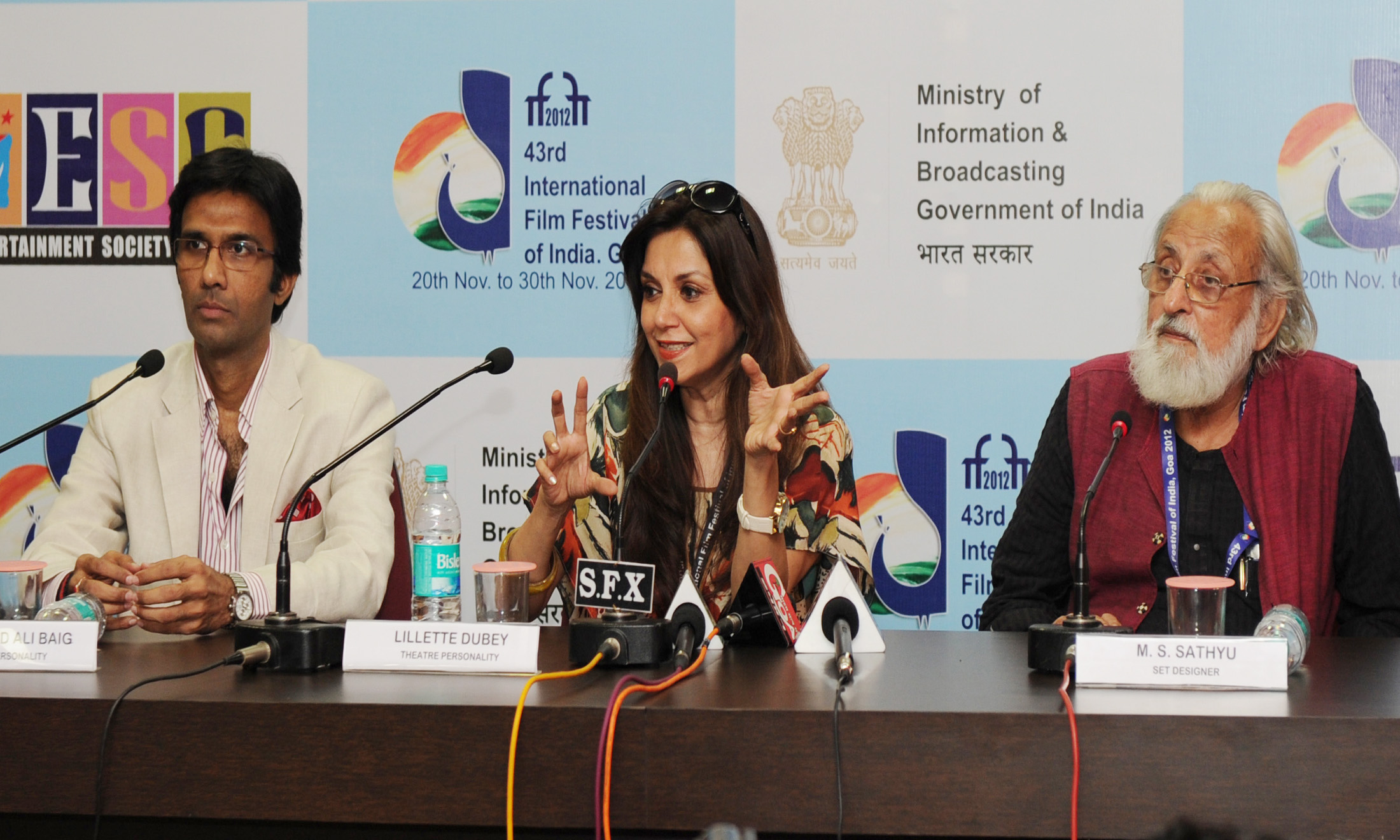
- Mohammad Ali Baig (at left)
- Born: Mohammad Ali Baig; Hyderabad, Telangana, India
- Occupations: Theatre Personality, and Ad and Documentary Film Maker
- Known for: Theatre

Mohammad Ali Baig is an Indian theatre personality and film maker of ad and documentary films, referred to by the media as 'Global Face of Hyderabadi Theatre', 'Sultan of Epics' and 'Master of Revival'. He is the recipient of the Padmashri. He founded the Qadir Ali Baig Theatre Foundation in Hyderabad in 2005, as a tribute to his father, theatre legend late Qadir Ali Baig. In April 2014, he was awarded Padma Shri, the fourth highest civilian award in India, in 2014 for his contributions in theatre arts.

Born into a recognized theatre families in India, the playwright-director-actor works within the family traditions. He established the Qadir Ali Baig Theatre Festival in Hyderabad to support local theatrical productions. He is the founder and curator of the Qadir Ali Baig Theatre Festival, held annually in Hyderabad during October–November.

== Early life ==
Mohammad Ali Baig was born to renowned theatre personality, Qadir Ali Baig in Hyderabad and Begum Razia Baig, who is Chairperson of the Qadir Ali Baig Theatre Foundation. Mohammad Ali Baig traversed almost the entire gamut of Indian theatre as a child, and avant-garde world theatre as a teenager.

== Career ==
At an age when most youngsters would be stepping out of film school and beginning to assist senior filmmakers, Mohammad Ali Baig was already directing stalwarts in the industry as an advertising film maker, and became the youngest director-on-board of India’s pioneering public limited TV and films production company, Odyssey in Bangalore.

Mohammad Ali Baig has produced and directed over 400 advertising and corporate films for leading Indian and foreign brands in India, Thailand, and in other countries. His ad films, short films, and social documentaries have been telecast around the world; from Doordarshan in India to BBC in UK, Discovery Channel in USA, CNN and Moscow Television in Russia.

He formed the ‘Qadir Ali Baig Theatre Foundation’ in 2005 along with his mother Begum Razia Baig and Lakshmi Devi Raj, as a tribute to his legendary father and to revive quality theatre in Hyderabad. One of the most experienced and prominent names in Indian theatre today, His own productions include: South India’s biggest original musical production in Hindustani, ‘Taramati- The Legend of an Artist’, ‘His Exalted Highness’, ‘Reading Between the Lines’, ‘Raat Phoolon Ki’, ‘Resham Ki Dor’, ‘Pankhdiyaan’, ‘Aaina’, ‘Dada Saheb Phalke’, ‘Quli: Dilon ka Shahzaada', ‘Savaan-e-Hayat’, 'Spaces' and '1857: Turrebaz Khan'.

'Quli : Dilon ka Shahzaada', 'Savaan-e-Hayat', 'Spaces' (co-written by and also featuring Baig's wife, writer-actor Noor Baig) have been feted at prestigious festivals and venues in India, Canada, France, Turkey, UK and USA. 'Quli: Dilon ka Shahzaada' has a successful week-long run at Edinburgh Festival Fringe 2016. His latest play '1857: Turrebaz Khan' had its world premiere there, followed by a premiere in London.

== Filmography ==
Year	Film	Role	Language
2017	Aruvi	Mohammad Shakeel Waqaab	Tamil
2022	Cobra	Kathir's guru	Tamil
2022	Sardar	P. K. Abraham	Tamil

=== Web series ===
Year	Film	Role	Language	Platform
2020	She	Alam	Hindi; English	Netflix
2021	In the Name of God	Rossi	Telugu	Aha
2022	Aha Naa Pellanta	Mr. K	Telugu	ZEE5

== Awards ==
He has won two international awards for his film ‘Rockumentary’. Various global honors (French Honor in Paris, Awards in Theatre in Toronto and Chicago, Retrospectives in Turkey, UK and USA) have been for his kind of theatre of multiculturalism. His theatre productions have been the focus of several international festivals in India, Canada, France, Pakistan, Turkey, USA and UK. His theatre is modeled on his father’s Spectacle Theatre, his works are performed in forts, palaces and stadiums. He is credited for reviving theatre in Hyderabad over the past decade. As a documentary filmmaker, he has over 450 productions to his credit, bringing him over 40 awards globally.

In April 2014, he was awarded Padma Shri, the fourth highest civilian award in India, in 2014 for his contributions in theatre arts.

== See also ==
- Qadir Ali Baig Theatre Festival
