= Lineman (2024 Tamil film) =

Indian drama film

- Release poster
- Directed by: Udhaikumar M
- Written by: Udhaikumar M
- Produced by: Vinoth Sekar; Dinakar Babu; Saravanan Marimuthu
- Starring: Charle; Jagan Balaji; Tamizhselvam
- Cinematography: Vishnu K Raja
- Edited by: Sivaraj
- Music by: Deepak Nandhakumar
- Production companies: Petra Studios; Madras Stories Production; SGC Entertainment Production; Green 4 Entertainment
- Distributed by: aha
- Release date: 22 November 2024
- Country: India
- Language: Tamil

Lineman is 2024 Indian Tamil-language drama film written and directed by M Udhai Kumar and starring Charle and Jegan Balaji with Aditi Balan in a cameo appearance. The film was produced by Vinoth Sekar and Dinakar Babu.

== Cast ==
- Charle as Subbayya
- Jagan Balaji as Senthil
- Saranya Ravichandran
- Aditi Balan as collector (cameo appearance)
- Tamizhselvam as Tamizh

== Production ==
The film was produced by Vinoth Sekar and Dinakar Babu, Saravanan Marimuthu and the technical crew consists of Vishnu K Raja as the cinematographer, Deepak Nandhakumar as the music composer, Tamizhselvam as dialogue writer,Sivaraj as the editor.

== Reception ==
Thinkal Menon of The Times of India rated the film two point five out of five and wrote that "Lineman works as a tribute to people whose talent goes unnoticed". Anusha Sundar of OTT Play rated two out of five and wrote, "Lineman is a film that has its heart in multiple places. It neither lets you understand the world the characters are set in nor has a streamlined vision." Sreejith Mullappilly of Cinema Express rated one point five out of five and stated that "Lineman has a trenchant story but little power in its storytelling". Latha Srinivasan of Hindustan Times noted that "Lineman is a well-intentioned rural social drama but it sadly remains superficial and doesn't engage you enough."
