= Kadhal Oviyam =

- Theatrical release poster
- Directed by: Bharathiraja
- Written by: Manivannan (dialogues)
- Screenplay by: Bharathiraja
- Story by: P. Kalaimani
- Produced by: P. Jayarajaa; S.P Sigamani
- Starring: Kannan; Radha
- Cinematography: B. Kannan
- Edited by: R. Bhaskaran
- Music by: Ilaiyaraaja
- Production company: Manoj Creations
- Release date: 30 April 1982
- Country: India
- Language: Tamil

Kadhal Oviyam (/kɑːðəl oʊvijəm/ transl. Painting of love) is a 1982 Indian Tamil-language romantic drama film directed by Bharathiraja. The film stars newcomer Kannan and Radha. It was released on 30 April 1982..

== Plot ==
Sakthi was an orphan, born in temple and sang devotional hymns for the temple idol. He became blind after an accident. Ponni used to hear him singing at the temple and falls in love with him. However, Ponni's mother Vadivukarasi wanted her to marry Radharavi, her relation who had come from Singapore. Ponni is not willing to marry Radharavi.

Ponni performs all of Sakthi's chores without his knowledge. As Sakthi is blind, he is unable to see Ponni, but he can hear Ponni's anklets (an ornament which Bharatanatyam dancers wore on their legs). Once when Sakthi makes a floral offering to the Ambal, they fall on Ponni. From that incident Ponni thinks that Sakthi is her spouse and breaks to him the news and Sakthi responds positively to the suggestion.

Due to illness, Ponni does not meet Sakthi for three days. When Sakthi learns that she is ill, he goes to her house to see her. Her mother discreetly enquires about Sakthi. Ponni says that he is an astrologer and that he is blind. Ponni's mother informs her worker to give him food as he looked like a beggar. After she leaves, Ponni apologises to Sakthi for her mother's behaviour and when both talk, Nayanam hears it and informs Radharavi. Immediately, Radharavi's family goes to Ponni's home for fixing the marriage. But in the engagement, Ponni says that she doesn't like him.

After getting frustrated with Ponni's decision, Radharavi's men put Sakthi inside a haystack and set fire to it. Ponni finds him and rescues him, and later they elope together. Both are starving and Ponni wants Sakthi to sing songs for money for their living. While considering Ponni's acclaim, she was kidnapped by some people who smoke marijuana. They tied the hands and legs of Ponni. Meanwhile, Nayanam finds her and takes her back to her home. She marries Janagaraj who is a Chettiyar and Dharamakatha (a person managing temple activities) for a famous temple.

Sakthi was adopted by a famous singer who arranges eye operation for him and he gets back his vision. He became a famous singer and Janagaraj arranges a temple function and invite Sakthi to sing in that function. Sakthi always thinks of Ponni and searches for her in all the functions where he sang. Sakthi went to Janagaraj's home to stay. Ponni is so stunned after seeing him that she drops his Aarthi plate.

Sakthi was too much depressed after Ponni left him. Hearing the love story of Sakthi and Ponni, Janagaraj felt very sad for Sakthi and wants to join him with his lover, without knowing the real truth that his wife is the lover of Sakthi. Ponni too couldn't say to Sakthi that she is Ponni, and she is married. Ponni learns that this is the last song Sakthi sings as he won't sing any more songs.

Sakthi sings his last song, during the end of the song Ponni wakes up from her seat and walks towards Sakthi in the function. From her salangi sound, Sakthi finds out that she is Ponni. Heavy rain breaks down and all the people run away. But Sakthi continues to sing for which Ponni dance in rain. Ponni knowingly hits pillars of the temples while dancing and dies. After seeing her die, Sakthi touches the Salangai of Ponni, praises it and dies at her feet.

== Cast ==
- Kannan as Sakthi (Voice dubbed by S. N. Surendar)
- Radha as Ponni (Voice dubbed by Anuradha R)
- Ramanamoorthy
- Goundamani as Nayanam
- Janagaraj
- M. R. Radha Ravi
- Vellai Subbaiah
- Haja Sheriff
- Thanjai Balakrishnan
- Manivannan
- Dhanapal
- Kamalasekhar
- Archana

== Production ==
Newcomer Sunil Kirpalani was chosen to portray the lead role, and Kadhal Oviyam was the only film he ever acted in at the time, barring a brief appearance in Meendum Oru Kaathal Kathai (1985). Bharathiraja's assistant Manohar spotted Kirpalani at a book store at Egmore. He was rechristened after his favourite therukoothu performer Kannappa Thambiran, which Bharathiraja shortened to Kannan. The dialogues were written by Manivannan. The Bharatanatyam dance sequence involving Radha was shot at Thanjavur temple.

== Soundtrack ==
The soundtrack was composed by Ilaiyaraaja. The song "Amma Azhage" is often misidentified as being set to the Carnatic raga Revati, but actually has "shades" of Malahari. "Velli Chalangaigal" is set to Chandrakauns raga, "Naadham En" is set to Abheri, "Nathiyil Aadum" is set to Kalyani, "Poovil Vandu" is set to Mohanam, and "Sangeetha Jaathi" is set to Revati and Simhendramadhyamam.

Track listing
No.	Title	Lyrics	Singer(s)	Length
1.	"Ammaa Azhage"	Vairamuthu	S. P. Balasubrahmanyam
2.	"Kuyilae Kuyilae"	Panchu Arunachalam	S. P. Balasubrahmanyam, S. Janaki
3.	"Naatham En Jeevanae"	Vairamuthu	S. Janaki
4.	"Nathiyil Aadum"	Vairamuthu	S. P. Balasubrahmanyam, S. Janaki, Deepan Chakravarthy
5.	"Poojaikkaaga Vaazhum"	Vairamuthu	Deepan Chakravarthy
6.	"Poovil Vandu"	Vairamuthu	S. P. Balasubrahmanyam
7.	"Sangeetha Jaathimullai"	Vairamuthu	S. P. Balasubrahmanyam
8.	"Velli Salangaikal"	Vairamuthu	S. P. Balasubrahmanyam

== Release and reception ==
Kadhal Oviyam was released on 30 April 1982. S. Shivakumar in his review for Mid-Day in 1982 gave the film a negative review, calling it the "biggest disappointment of the year" and criticised the plot as an unsuccessful amalgamation of Siri Siri Muvva (1976) and Sankarabharanam (1980). He was also critical of the film's photography as it "fails to capture the beauty of Tanjore temple" and Ilaiyaraaja's music was "not in form"; however he praised the performances of the lead actors who "portray their roles with maturity and pose". Thiraignani of Kalki praised the acting of the lead actors, Manivannan's dialogues and Ilaiyaraaja's music and concluded this film is also an Isaiyabharanam (jewel of music) like Sankarabharanam. Balumani of Anna lauded B. Kannan's cinematography and said Ilaiyaraaja's music was fine.

== Bibliography ==
- Sundararaman (2007) [2005]. Raga Chintamani: A Guide to Carnatic Ragas Through Tamil Film Music (2nd ed.). Chennai: Pichhamal Chintamani. OCLC 295034757.
