= Qadir Ali Baig Theatre Festival =

Annual theatre festival in Hyderabad, India

- Founded: 2005
- Founded by: Mohammad Ali Baig
- Festival date: November/December

Qadir Ali Baig Theatre Festival is an annual theatre festival held in Hyderabad, India.

== History ==
Qadir Ali Baig was an eminent theatre personality from Hyderabad. Between 1970 and 1984, Qader Ali was an important figure in the Hyderabad theatre circuit. He formed the New Theatre of Hyderabad (NTH) in 1970 and featured in plays like Sakharam Binder, Adhey Adhoore, Khamosh Adalat Jaari Hai and Kehron Ke Rajhans. His period plays had sets and props that recreated the magnificence of the Mughal and the Asaf Jahi eras in plays like Quli Qutb Shah,Tana Shah, Mahboob-e-Deccan and Kohinoor ka Lutera.

Baig's son Mohammed Ali Baig, a producer-director himself, heads the Hyderabad-based Qadir Ali Baig Theatre Foundation. In 2005, Mohammed Ali felt the need to revive the theatre culture in Hyderabad. Together with arts personalities like dancer Vani Ganapathy, actors such as Rohini Hattangadi, Suhasini Mani Ratnam and Urmila Matondkar, lyricist Javed Akhtar and director M. S. Sathyu, Mohammed Ali planned a series of plays to its effect.

Plays such as Aparajita directed by Jayadev Hattangadi and featuring Rohini Hattangadi were performed in 2005. In the following year, a play on Abdullah Qutb Shah's courtesan Taramati was showcased by the foundation. The media spoke highly about this play:

Through the evening, the breathtaking historic venue stole the show. Dr. M.S. Sathyu's makeshift stages and clever lighting definitely helped. Veteran actress Rashmi Seth as Hayat Bakshi Begum was easily the best of the actors. She made her crisp, short part seem like a cakewalk ... With names like Mohammad Ali Baig (director), music (Kaarthik Ilayaraja) and Ashok Lal (research) coming together, it could have been much more than just a love story.
