= Nathicharami =

2018 Kannada film directed by Mansore

- Release poster
- Directed by: Manjunatha Somashekara Reddy (Mansore)
- Screenplay by: Manjunatha Somashekara Reddy (Mansore)
- Story by: Sandhya Rani
- Produced by: M. Ramesh
- Starring: Sruthi Hariharan; Sanchari Vijay
- Cinematography: Guruprasad Narnad
- Edited by: Nagendra K. Ujjani
- Music by: Bindhu Malini
- Production company: Tejaswini Enterprises
- Release date: 28 December 2018 (Karnataka)
- Country: India
- Language: Kannada

Nathicharami is a 2018 Indian Kannada-language film co-written and directed by Mansore (Manjunatha Somakeshava Reddy). (Note: Attributed to multiple sources) The film stars Sruthi Hariharan and Sanchari Vijay with Sharanya, Poornachandra Mysore, Balaji Manohar and Gopalkrishna Deshpande in key roles. The music of the film is scored by Bindhu Malini.

The film had its world premiere in the India Story category and was nominated for the Oxfam Best film on Gender Equality Award at the 20th Jio MAMI Mumbai Film Festival.

Nathicharami won five awards at the 66th National film awards in 2019. Best Female Playback Singer went to Bindhu Malini for the song Mayaavi Manave, Best Lyrics for Manjunath S for the same song and Best Editing went to Nagendra K Ujjani. The movie also won the award for Best Feature Film in Kannada. Shruthi Hariharan got a Special Mention for Best Actress for her performance. The film was remade in Malayalam as Neeraja (2023).

== Synopsis ==
Nathicharami is about Gowri whose life is perplexed between her physical desires and emotional beliefs. Gowri is an independent working woman living in the city alone. She is in continuous mourning of the untimely demise of her husband years ago. She still loves him and has filled her house with his belongings, memories and pictures. However, she has the desires of her body which she does not know how to address. The film narrates the struggles of the Gowri in a society that believes that a woman's physical desires can only be followed by a nuptial. Gowri is surrounded by people from her daily life who talk about their notions that are contrary to the other. A psychologist helps her navigate the confusions in her mind. Finally, when she feels that she has overcome her ambiguity, the situation takes a leap.

The film also follows another husband and wife duo. The husband who has emotionally abandoned his wife, and the wife who eagerly puts in efforts to rekindle their relationship.

The film also brings the audience's attention towards the nuances women from different walks of life face.

== Cast ==
- Sruthi Hariharan as Gowri
- Sanchari Vijay as Suresh
- Sharanya as Suma, Suresh's wife
- Poornachandra Mysore as Mahesh, Gowri's husband
- Balaji Manohar as Dr. Carvalho (Psychiatrist)
- Gopalkrishna Deshpande as Ravi, colleague of Suresh
- Shantala as Jayamma, house maid
- Vallabha as Abhimanyu
- Greeshma Shridhar, colleague of Gowri
- Harshil Koushik, colleague of Gowri
- Dr. Seetha Kote, mother of Gowri
- Kalagangotri Manju
- Pradeep Shivamogga
- K. J. Pavan

== Soundtrack ==
Nathicharami

Soundtrack album by Bindhu Malini
- Studio: Astral RMP Aditya MT's Studio
- Genre: Feature Film Soundtrack
- Language: Kannada
- Label: Zee Music
- Producer: Bindhu Malini

The film's score and soundtracks are composed by Bindhu Malini.

All music is composed by Bindhu Malini.

Tracklist
| No. | Title | Lyrics | Singer(s) | Length |
|---|---|---|---|---|
| 1. | "Vasundhare" | Kiran Kaverappa | Bindhu Malini | 4:08 |
| 2. | "Yaariva" | Nandhini Nanjappa | Bindhu Malini | 3:41 |
| 3. | "Bhaavaloka" | Kiran Kaverappa | Bindhu Malini, Sanchari Vijay | 3:45 |
| 4. | "Maayavi Manave" | Mansore | Bindhu Malini | 3:50 |
| 5. | "Dehavu Naane" | Madan Bellisalu | Bindhu Malini | 2:54 |
| 6. | "Desire- Opening title track" | — | — | 4:25 |
| 7. | "Dawn- End title track" | — | — | 3:27 |
| Total length: | | | | 24:50 |

== Reception ==
Sunayana Suresh of The Times of India gave it 3.5 out of 5 stars and wrote, "Nathicharami is different, bold and relevant. It talks about desires and yet discusses the idea of consent. The film is definitely a step towards more gender sensitive cinema that is required in the industry." Jagadish Angadi of the Deccan Herald gave it a rating of 3.5 out of 5, noting that "the film's psychological and physical explorations remain incomplete. It is reduced to the status of an adult art movie. The lack of a background score in many scenes affects the cinematic experience."

Aravind Shwetha of The News Minute gave it a positive review and wrote, "The movie is a must-watch, if you can sit through the slow pace."

Prathima Nandakumar of The Week gave it a rating of 3.5 out of 5, noting that "Nathicharami is a thought-provoking movie, slow-paced, yet engaging."

== Accolades ==
| Year | Ceremony | Category | Recipient(s) and nominee(s) | Result | Ref. |
|---|---|---|---|---|---|
| 2019 | 66th National Film Awards | Best Feature Film in Kannada | M. Ramesh & Mansore | Won | |
| 2019 | 66th National Film Awards | Best Lyrics | Mansore for "Maayavi Manave" | Won | |
| 2019 | 66th National Film Awards | Best Female Playback Singer | Bindhumalini | Won | |
| 2019 | 66th National Film Awards | Best Editing | Nagendra K. Ujjani | Won | |
| 2019 | 66th National Film Awards | Special Mention for Best Actress | Sruthi Hariharan | Won | |
| 2019 | Filmfare Awards South | Best Film – Kannada | Nathicharami | Nominated | |
| 2019 | Filmfare Awards South | Best Director – Kannada | Mansore | Won | |
| 2019 | Filmfare Awards South | Best Actress – Kannada | Sruthi Hariharan | Nominated | |
| 2019 | Filmfare Awards South | Critics Best Actress – Kannada | Sruthi Hariharan | Won | |
| 2019 | Filmfare Awards South | Best Lyricist – Kannada | Kiran Kaverappa | Nominated | |
| 2019 | Filmfare Awards South | Best Female Playback Singer – Kannada | Bindhumalini | Won | |
| 2019 | Filmfare Awards South | Best Supporting Actress – Kannada | Sharanya | Won | |
| 2021 | 10th South Indian International Movie Awards | Best Director | Best Director | Nominated | |
