= Aruvi =

2016 Indian film by Arun Prabu Purushothaman

- Theatrical release poster
- Directed by: Arun Prabu Purushothaman
- Written by: Arun Prabu Purushothaman
- Produced by: S. R. Prabhu; S. R. Prakash Babu
- Starring: Aditi Balan; Anjali Varadhan; Lakshmi Gopalaswamy
- Cinematography: Shelley Calist
- Edited by: Raymond Derrick Crasta
- Music by: Bindhumalini; Vedanth Bharadwaj
- Production company: Dream Warrior Pictures
- Distributed by: Dream Warrior Pictures
- Release dates: 14 June 2016 (Shanghai International Film Festival); 15 December 2017 (India)
- Running time: 130 minutes
- Country: India
- Language: Tamil
- Budget: ₹1 Crore
- Box office: est. ₹35 Crores

Aruvi (transl. Waterfalls) is a 2017 Indian Tamil-language crime drama film written and directed by Arun Prabu Purushothaman, in his directorial debut. Produced and distributed by S. R. Prakash Babu and S. R. Prabhu of Dream Warrior Pictures, the film stars Aditi Balan, Anjali Vardhan, and Lakshmi Gopalaswamy, while Pradeep Antony and Mohammad Ali Baig play supporting roles. The film portrays the events that occur in the life of Aruvi, a rebellious young woman who seeks to expose the consumerist and misogynistic nature of modern civilisation, while attempting to find meaning during a period of existential crisis.

Arun Prabu Purushothaman wrote a script based on global conflicts in late-2009, but as the scripting took a long time to materialise, he later halted the project and worked on another script in late-2013 which became Aruvi. The film revolves around how HIV patients are treated in society, and for the titular character, Prabu had approached leading actresses, however they rejected the script because of the sensitive nature in the topic and eventually, Aditi Balan was selected through an audition. The entire cast and crew were consisted of newcomers, Shelley Calist handled the cinematography, Raymond Derrick Crasta edited the film and indie musicians Bindhumalini and Vedanth Bharadwaj composed the film's soundtrack and score.

The film began pre-production in mid-2014 and was shot within six months across Chennai, Trivandrum and Kochi. Aruvi was premiered at various film festival circuits, the first public screening was held at the Shanghai International Film Festival held during 14 June 2016. It was theatrically released worldwide on 15 December 2017 to highly positive reviews from critics. It was praised for the performances of the cast, especially of Balan, the film's direction and other technical aspects. It was considered one of the '25 Greatest Tamil Films of the Decade' by Film Companion.

At the 65th Filmfare Awards South, Aditi Balan won the Filmfare Critics Award for Best Actress – Tamil, the only win out of its four nominations at the ceremony. The film additionally won two South Indian International Movie Awards, two Vijay Awards, a Techofes Award, two Edison Awards, four Norway Tamil Film Festival Awards, four Ananda Vikatan Cinema Awards and two Tamil Nadu State Film Awards. The film was a financial success, grossing ₹350 million against a budget of ₹10 million.

== Plot ==
The film begins with Aruvi (Aditi Balan) and Emily (Anjali Varadhan) being interrogated by law enforcement officer Mohammad Shakeel Waqaab (Mohammad Ali Baig), who suspects Aruvi to be part of a terrorist organization. Aruvi's parents and friends are called for interrogation and they talk about Aruvi's childhood and adolescence. She is a lovingly raised, innocent girl from a middle-class family. Things take a turn in her life when her family turns against her and kicks her out of the house, accusing her of having brought shame to the family. Her college friend Jessy (Shwetha Shekar) takes her in for a while, then moves to a hostel and lives with Emily, who is a transgender woman. They work for a man called Arulmani (Madan Chakravarthy) as tailors in an NGO. One day, she goes to Arulmani crying, asking for a loan of 1 lakh rupees as her father (Thirunavukkarasu) has suffered a minor cardiac arrest. She then takes off and does not return. Occasionally, she undergoes touch therapy with a Swami who uses hypnosis to heal stress.

Emily approaches the producers of Solvathellam Sathyam, a reality show that showcases people's problems on TV. She complains about three men who raped her friend Aruvi. Assistant director Peter (Pradeep Antony) agrees to telecast their problem and calls the three men for interrogation. The next morning, shooting starts as the host, Shobha Parthasarathy (Lakshmi Gopalaswamy), asks Aruvi to narrate what happened to her. Aruvi then explains that the three men are Jessy's father, Joseph Mohandas (Mani Kutty), Arulmani, and the Swami. Joseph had sexually abused Aruvi when she took shelter in his house. Arulmani had taken advantage of Aruvi's situation when she begged for a loan, and the Swami had hypnotized and raped her. Aruvi then reveals that she has had AIDS for the past two years (which occurred due to her getting infected through a wound in her mouth after an injury while having coconut water; the seller had inadvertently shed his blood into the straw while cutting open the coconut). She meets her friend Emily at an NGO as both of them have AIDS. Aruvi asks the three men to apologize, but Shobha turns against Aruvi, accusing her of intentionally infecting those men (who were all tested negative for an HIV test performed during the show). Aruvi is appalled and states everything wrong with the society and the unnecessary stereotypes that every common man has to conform to, in order to fit into this consumeristic world.

The director, Balaji (Kavitha Bharathy) used all this drama and hid the HIV test results from the three men so as to improve his show's TRP rating. Aruvi pulls out a gun and shoots Balaji in the arm. Later, she calms herself and apologizes to everyone, but as she gets up to leave, Arulmani tackles her and hits Emily. This maddens Aruvi, and she starts hitting Arulmani with a rebar and takes everyone hostage, holding them at gunpoint. Aruvi then takes control and subjects the hostages to trivial games and activities; the main motive was to impress Aruvi and share others' feelings with each other, failing which Aruvi threatened to shoot them dead. The hostages abide by Aruvi's instructions and go with the activities. The sound of the commotions causes a wide public stir and police surround the premises. Aruvi gets a call from Shakeel, and she assures him of the safety of the hostages and her apprehension towards him after a while. During the course of the game, everyone seems to get affected by Stockholm syndrome, and they become friendly with Aruvi. She even forgives the three men who raped her.

Aruvi suffers a nosebleed by the time she surrenders to the police. Since she and Emily are AIDS patients, they cannot be arrested and have to be isolated inside the camp. Aruvi's condition continues to deteriorate as she loses a lot of weight and becomes incapable of taking care of herself. One night, she disappears from the camp and moves to a village all alone. After a few days, all of Aruvi's friends (the hostages) receive a video from Aruvi on Facebook. The video shows her crying and explaining how she misses everyone and speaks about all the regrets in her life. On seeing the video, Peter gathers everyone and takes them to the village in which Aruvi currently resides (an allusion to Peter's story that he narrated to Aruvi during the hostage situation). Peter gifts Aruvi a card with "Love you Aruvi, Peter," written on it. Touched, she reciprocates his feelings (this too was a revisit of Peter's earlier proposal to Aruvi during the incident, albeit in a bland way before).

Everyone cheers Aruvi up by playing the bottle game and having a great time with her to make the last few days of her life sweet and memorable. The movie ends with Peter capturing an image of Aruvi smiling.

== Cast ==
- Aditi Balan as Aruvi
  - Praniti as Young Aruvi
  - Baby Dakshana as Baby Aruvi
- Anjali Varadhan as Emily/Jessica
- Mohammad Ali Baig as DGP Mohammad Shakeel Waqaab
- Lakshmi Gopalaswamy as Shobha Parthasarathy, TV show host
- Kavitha Bharathy as Director Balaji
- Pradeep Antony as Peter
- Madan Chakravarthy as Arulmani
- Karthikeyan Chinnasamy as Venkataapuri Sri Badri Sesaadri Deetsidhar
- Mani Kutty as Joseph Mohandas
- Thirunavukkarasu as Aruvi's father
- Hema as Aruvi's mother
- Arnold Mathew as Karuna, Aruvi's brother
- Shwetha Shekar as Jessy
- Balaji as Subash (office boy at the channel)
- Apoorva Natraj as Jeyashree
- Pushpalatha as Vijayalakshmi
- K. Babu as Inspector
- Kuppusami as Ramana
- Vijayaraman as Security
- Bharath as Badshah
- Hemalatha as Papathi
- Sharmi as Shabi
- Kamala as Dr. Sharada Kittappa

== Production ==
=== Development ===
Everyone goes through boredom, frustration and they question themselves whether they fit in the society or not. I wanted to reflect all these thoughts and questions of youngsters. My story was about a person shunned by the society, but who still loved the society. I also don’t think that the stigmas that we talk about actually exist. It's just that we think they exist.

— Arun Prabu Purushothaman, about Aruvi in an interview with The Times of India

Arun Prabu Purushothaman, an associate of Balu Mahendra and K. S. Ravikumar, wrote a script based on global conflicts in late-2009 and took more than three years for the writing, as he felt the script is a quite complicated process and not easy to transform it completely on-screen. As the scripting took more time, he eventually shelved that project and worked on another script during his final years of college in September 2013. (Note: The film was later made as Vaazhl and released in 2020.) When Arun Prabu narrated the script to producer S. R. Prabhu, Prabhu felt impressed by his narration and also he revealed that "he could not get the story out of his mind for a week", later giving his nod to produce the film.

Prabu did not have an iota of the script when he started his concepts of the film during 2013. He wrote the film based on the day-to-day activities of youngsters in India, but the motive he focused on was based on the struggles faced by the youngsters in the current generation, as he intended to make a film that reflected the mindset of youngsters in all the countries. Prabu refused to describe the film as a realistic film, but said that the film is "complete fiction" and also a "new-age masala film" since it mixes various genres, including action, comedy and drama and also commercial films have huge exposure among audiences. He did, however, choose to avoid "songs with a number of dancers in the background", a recurring feature of masala films.

=== Casting and filming ===
The entire cast and crew members were mostly debutants. Over 600 applicants had applied and auditioned for the lead role, out of which the team chose Aditi Balan, an advocate based from Chennai. Shwetha Shekhar, who appeared in several commercials and short films, played in a supporting role, for whom it became her first feature-length film. Lakshmi Gopalswami, appeared in the supporting role, who was the only cast member with acting experience. The film's cinematography was handled by Shelly Calist, while editing was done by Raymond Derrick Crasta. Prior to the film's release, Arun Prabu approached established actors such as Nayanthara, Samantha Ruth Prabhu and Shruti Haasan but they declined due to various reasons. But, Arun Prabu said that as the cast and crew were mostly newcomers, the scope for revenue was minimal.

Aditi Balan accepted the script while reading as it featured an emotional bond between father and daughter. Since the entire cast were debutantes, Arun Prabu decided to conduct an acting workshop for three months, to prepare shooting for the film. (Note: Aditi Balan appeared in a short uncredited role in Yennai Arindhaal (2015).) Post the reading session, Aditi prepared a lengthy dialogue which was filmed in a single shoot. She had to undergo a lot of physical changes, in a climax sequence, Aditi had a strict diet to lose more than 10 kilos, and has to be isolated for 45 days, without communicating to person, so as to prepare for the shooting, describing it as "exhausting, both physically and mentally" but had loved the challenge. Theatre personality Mohammad Ali Baig, played the role of Mohammad Shakeel Waqaab, a Director general of police, interrogating Aruvi. Made at a production cost of ₹2 crore, the film began shooting in Chennai, Trivandrum, Kochi and was completed within six months.

== Themes and influences ==
The film revolves around the problems faced by HIV patients in the society, where the film focuses about love, humanity and compassion. It is considered to be a multi-genre film, that considered to be a non-linear narrative, where multiple storytelling devices are used. Along with this screenplay, the film also showcases on the LGBT angle, as Aruvi (Aditi Balan) had a mutual relationship with Emily (Anjali Varathan). Arun Prabu, an ardent follower of world cinema, revealed in an interview with Baradwaj Rangan of Film Companion South, saying that inspired the works of Pedro Almodóvar, Robert Bresson, Jean-Luc Godard and also had inspired The Battle of Algiers (1966) by Gillo Pontecorvo, which he described it as his favourite film. He added that during the writing of Aruvi, he was highly fascinated by Parasakthi (1952), where the interrogation scene of that film, with Sivaji Ganesan in a court, was served as the inspiration for the film.

Several allegations of plagiarism was levied against Arun Prabu as the film's opening sequence shared a resemblance between the Egyptian film Asmaa (2011). Following the reactions in social media, Arun Prabu later watched the film before the release, saying that it is quite essential for film enthusiasts to discuss and compare two films which share a similar plot. But requested cinephiles to watch both films fully and express their point of views. He felt that "with the film, they had got an opportunity to watch both the films and after watching, they can understand the contrast difference between the two films". He added that " In Aruvi, only the first 15 minutes revolve around the titular character’s life and upbringing. Later, the story entirely takes a shift to talk about the society and people’s problems more." The reality show Solvathellam Sathyam featured in the film, was inspired from Solvathellam Unmai. Lakshmy Ramakrishnan, the host of that show expressed disappointment about the makers for making a jibe on it.

== Soundtrack ==
The film score and soundtrack were jointly composed by Bindhumalini and Vedanth Bharadwaj, in their debut composition for a feature film. Arun Prabu had listened to the studio album Suno Bhai, which he felt impressed and decided to approach them, as the film needed a "soulful sound". The duo worked on the film's music during the pre-production stages and planned for 33 original compositions — including the film's songs and score. Despite their Carnatic music background, the duo had composed a variety of genres. Arun Prabu wrote lyrics for two of the tracks, while the rest of them were penned by Kutti Revathi, and the film also included a classical song written by poet Oothukkadu Venkata Kavi centuries ago.

The duo worked on the film's music for three years, since 2014, and recorded the album and score in Chennai and Mumbai. On the occasion of World Music Day (21 June 2017), the track "Anbin Kodi", deciphered as the "Party Song", was released as a single and received positive response. The album consists of six tracks, was released on 1 September 2017 by Dream Warrior Pictures and was widely appreciated by music critics.

== Release ==
Aruvi was screened at various film festivals worldwide, with the first being at the Shanghai International Film Festival held on 14 June 2016 and received acclaim from audience. The film was initially scheduled for theatrical release on 1 December 2017, but was postponed to 15 December due to various reasons. The teaser of the film was released during 10 November 2017 and received positive response from viewers. After the reception from the press show held at Sathyam Cinemas on 11 December, four days before the release, Nikilesh Surya, owner of Rohini Silver Screens announced that the film will be premiered on a bigger complex during the theatrical release.

In Tamil Nadu, the makers increased the number of screens from 350 to 500. The film was distributed to over sixty screens across the United States, Malaysia, Singapore and Sri Lanka. In addition, the film was screened at Kerala on 29 December 2017. Amazon Prime Video acquired the digital distribution rights of Aruvi and premiered it on the streaming platform on 15 January 2018. However, the pirated versions of the high-definition print surfaced through the internet, even before the digital premiere. The film had its television premiere on Star Vijay on 25 March 2018.

== Critical reception ==
Aruvi received highly positive views upon release. Critics were particularly appreciative of the performances of the protagonist Aditi Balan and the supporting cast, and the film's direction. In his film review, Baradwaj Rangan of Film Companion South called it as "an ambitious, solidly written satire that takes an issue and does very unexpected things with it". M. Suganth of The Times of India rated four out of five stars for the film, calling it as "a superbly written drama centred around a unique character that unfolds as a thriller, a black comedy, an awareness movie, and a tragedy".

Praising the incredible performances by a team of newcomers, Vishal Menon of The Hindu called it as "one of the best films of the year". Anupama Subramanian of Deccan Chronicle said the film as an "exemplary work from Arun Prabu" and gave four-and-a-half out of five stars. Writing for Hindustan Times, Haricharan Pudipeddi stated "Aruvi means waterfalls and the movie, starring Aditi Balan in a bold avatar, itself is a flow of emotions. There’s drama, anger, laughter and loneliness all packaged very well. Though unintentionally funny at times, the film is not for the faint-hearted."

India Today-based critic Kirubakar Purushothaman rated four out of five and said "Aruvi (Waterfall) is of course about the heroine who lends her name to the film — Aditi Balan. But the name also stands as metaphor for the story itself. Like a waterfall — it gushes with force, hits the ground exploding at the interval, and flows fading away into nothingness in the climax." Sreedhar Pillai of Firstpost called it as one of the best films from Kollywood and further said "In an era of a shallow and fraudulent films masquerading as good cinema, here is something which is pure, and at the same time, entertaining. If you want to nit-pick, the film slides a bit by taking a preachy tone and overstretched melodrama towards the end. But these are just minor flaws in a gutsy and outstanding film."

Vikram Venkateshwaran of The Quint reviewed it as "a social commentary that’s as much about ripping apart a popular talk show, as it is about holding a mirror to you, the audience". Writing for The Indian Express, Ashameera Aiyyappan said "the movie is a cascade of emotions: laughter, tears, anger, loneliness, the film has everything in a neat package and ideals presented with great craft. It is a struggle to find a beginning point when a film has almost everything working in its favour." Rakesh Mehar of The News Minute said "Aruvi is not a perfect film. Some parts of the script do feel a tad contrived. And the film too lightly lets off three men who are accused of sexual assault or sexual exploitation. But these are minor quibbles in a film that otherwise works wonderfully." Sify stated it as "one of the best films of this year, it handles a relevant topic with an engaging screenplay".

== Accolades ==
Award (Note: Awards, festivals and organizations are in alphabetical order.)	Date of ceremony (Note: Date is linked to the article about the awards held that year, wherever possible.)	Category	Recipient(s)	Result	Ref.
Ananda Vikatan Cinema Awards	10 January 2018	Best Production	Dream Warrior Pictures	Won	
Ananda Vikatan Cinema Awards	10 January 2018	Best Debut Director	Arun Prabu Purushothaman	Won	
Ananda Vikatan Cinema Awards	10 January 2018	Best Debut Actress	Aditi Balan	Won	
Ananda Vikatan Cinema Awards	10 January 2018	Best Editor	Raymond Derrick Crasta	Won	
Edison Awards	26 February 2018	Best Debut Director	Arun Prabu Purushothaman	Won	
Edison Awards	26 February 2018	Best Debut Actress	Aditi Balan	Won	
Filmfare Awards South	16 June 2018	Best Film – Tamil	Aruvi – Dream Warrior Pictures	Nominated	
Filmfare Awards South	16 June 2018	Best Director – Tamil	Arun Prabu Purushothaman	Nominated	
Filmfare Awards South	16 June 2018	Best Actress – Tamil	Aditi Balan	Nominated	
Filmfare Awards South	16 June 2018	Critics Best Actress – Tamil	Aditi Balan	Won	
Filmfare Awards South	16 June 2018	Best Supporting Actress – Tamil	Anjali Varadhan	Nominated	
Norway Tamil Film Festival Awards	26 January 2018	Best Production	Dream Warrior Pictures	Won	
Norway Tamil Film Festival Awards	26 January 2018	Best Actor Female	Aditi Balan	Won	
Norway Tamil Film Festival Awards	26 January 2018	Best Supporting Actor Female	Anjali Varadhan	Won	
Norway Tamil Film Festival Awards	26 January 2018	Best Editor	Raymond Derrick Crasta	Won	
South Indian International Movie Awards	14–15 September 2018	Best Film – Tamil	Aruvi – Dream Warrior Pictures	Nominated	
South Indian International Movie Awards	14–15 September 2018	Best Director – Tamil	Arun Prabu Purushothaman	Nominated	
South Indian International Movie Awards	14–15 September 2018	Best Debut Director – Tamil	Arun Prabu Purushothaman	Won	
South Indian International Movie Awards	14–15 September 2018	Best Actress – Tamil	Aditi Balan	Nominated	
South Indian International Movie Awards	14–15 September 2018	Best Debut Actress – Tamil	Aditi Balan	Nominated	
South Indian International Movie Awards	14–15 September 2018	Critics Award for Best Actress – Tamil	Aditi Balan	Won	
South Indian International Movie Awards	14–15 September 2018	Best Supporting Actress – Tamil	Anjali Varadhan	Nominated	
Techofes Awards	17 February 2018	Best Debut Female	Aditi Balan	Won	
Vijay Awards	26 May 2018	Best Film	Aruvi – Dream Warrior Pictures	Won	
Vijay Awards	26 May 2018	Best Debut Director	Arun Prabu Purushothaman	Nominated	
Vijay Awards	26 May 2018	Best Story	Arun Prabu Purushothaman	Nominated	
Vijay Awards	26 May 2018	Best Screenplay	Arun Prabu Purushothaman	Nominated	
Vijay Awards	26 May 2018	Best Debut Actress	Aditi Balan	Won	
Tamil Nadu State Film Awards	30 January 226	Best Film About Women Empowerment	Aruvi	Won	
Tamil Nadu State Film Awards	30 January 226	Best Actress (Special Prize)	Aditi Balan	Won	
