= Vaazhl =

2021 film directed by Arun Prabhu Purushothaman

- Release poster
- Directed by: Arun Prabu Purushothaman
- Written by: Arun Prabu Purushothaman
- Produced by: Sivakarthikeyan
- Starring: Pradeep Antony; TJ Bhanu; Diva Dhawan; Aahrav
- Cinematography: Shelley Calist
- Edited by: Raymond Derrick Crasta
- Music by: Pradeep Kumar
- Production companies: Sivakarthikeyan Productions; Madhuram Pictures
- Distributed by: SonyLIV
- Release date: 16 July 2021
- Running time: 114 minutes
- Country: India
- Language: Tamil

Vaazhl (Tamil pronunciation: [ʋaːɻ] transl. Live) is a 2021 Indian Tamil-language drama film directed by Arun Prabu Purushothaman and produced by Sivakarthikeyan under his banner Sivakarthikeyan Productions. The film features a predominantly new cast and crew, which includes Pradeep Antony, TJ Bhanu, Diva Dhawan, Aahrav and SN Bhatt in prominent roles. The film's music is composed by Pradeep Kumar, with cinematography handled by Shelly Calist and editing done by Raymond Derrick Crasta.

The project was originally announced by R. D. Raja of 24AM Studios in May 2018. However, by June 2019, the production rights were acquired by Sivakarthikeyan. The film was shot across 100 unexplored locations across India and at islands in Indonesia and Papua New Guinea.

Vaazhl released through the streaming service SonyLIV on 16 July 2021. The film opened to positive reviews from critics, praising the performances of the cast members, storyline, direction, music and cinematography, but criticised the lack of depth and the slow-paced narration in the second half.

== Plot ==
Prakash is an IT programmer living with his parents and younger sister. His day-to-day life is dull and monotonous, his professional life is a mess and his love life is not exciting. Prakash's other sister who lives abroad is pregnant and his parents visit her to help with her delivery.

Prakash meets Yathramma (she is only known as Yathra's mother throughout the movie) at a relative's funeral and is smitten by her beauty at first sight. To his disappointment, he finds that she is older than him, is married and has a son, Yathra. Yathra has ADHD disorder and is extremely hyperactive and destructive, but Yathramma is very protective of him, even to her husband. One night, when Yathra throws a tantrum, his father loses his patience and threatens him to sleep in his own room. Yathramma tries to stop him but he is angry at her as well. The argument leads to a violent confrontation when Yathramma hits her husband with a piece of wood and kills him by accident. She panics, hides his dead body in the fridge, takes some money and leaves with Yathra in her car. She lands on Prakash's doorstep under the guise of borrowing money and asks Prakash to take care of Yathra for a few hours. She finds that Prakash has been patient in spite of Yathra's destructive behaviour. Yathramma requests Prakash to accompany them to Nagercoil to return the borrowed money to her friend. Prakash is unable to resist her innocent charm and agrees. During their travel, Yathramma insists that Prakash take longer routes and they go from city to city. Prakash eventually becomes suspicious of Yathramma's intentions and asks her the real reason. But she uses her vile charm to shut his questions down yet again. They become close after this and make love. However, Yathramma attempts suicide the next day, but the locals of a town save her. When Prakash questions her this time around, Yathramma comes clean about murdering her husband and tells that since they have become so close, she feels that she can now leave Yathra under Prakash's care and die. Prakash is shocked at this and wants out, but she indirectly threatens him using a phrase she taught Yathra to tell everyone. When asked, Yathra shouts that Prakash and Yathramma had sex. Prakash is scared out of his wits and stops the car to get water. Yathra goes with him leaving Yathramma behind, when a truck hits the car and kills Yathramma instantly.

Prakash is horrified at the terrible turn of events and is left with no choice but to take Yathra with him. When questioned by the police, Yathra relays the entire story, that Prakash had sex with his mother and his real father is dead. Prakash is arrested and the police also arrest a Bolivian woman Tanya, with fake passports and take them both to the police station. Tanya fights the cops and forces Prakash to escape along with Yathra. They reach a resort where Tanya helps Prakash calm down. In a bid to escape the police, she uses fake passports and takes Prakash and Yathra to Papua New Guinea. She encourages Prakash to travel, live his life and explore nature to achieve fulfilment in life. Their adventures take them across land, water, mountains and rivers to explore.

Meanwhile, in India, the police find a video confession from Yathramma proving Prakash's innocence. His parents try to reach him desperately, but Tanya, Yathra and Prakash travel to a remote village and spend time with the aborigines. Tanya receives a call to travel elsewhere, so she leaves Prakash and Yathra, knowing fully well that Prakash is now confident enough take care of himself. Prakash and Yathra then travel to another remote island and continue their adventure. On one such river rafting trips, their raft capsizes and Prakash is thrown off the river and goes down a waterfall. Yathra is stuck in the shallow water and moves to land by himself and wanders alone in the forest. Prakash gets his leg stuck under a rock and faints, but he regains consciousness and manages to get himself out of the water. He searches for Yathra and finally finds him, realising that he has grown to love Yathra as his own child. They travel back to India, where Prakash's family accepts Yathra. Prakash returns to work a transformed person and is able to achieve success. He fondly reminisces his experience with Yathramma and his adventures with Tanya, her words resounding in his mind, reminding him to take time off for himself no matter how important his work and family are.

== Cast ==
- Pradeep Antony as Prakash
- TJ Bhanu as Yathramma
- Diva Dhawan as Tanya
- Aahrav as Yathra
- SN Bhatt

== Production ==
=== Development ===
"We decided to make Vaazhl as our second film because of the response we got for Aruvi. The script is too unconventional. At least Aruvi had a few generic moments for mainstream audience. But that is not the case with Vaazhl, whose screenplay grammar is very different."

— Arun Prabu Purushothaman on Vaazhl being his sophomore directorial

On 29 May 2018, film producer R. D. Raja of 24AM Studios announced his next venture in collaboration with director Arun Prabu, who made his directorial debut with Aruvi (2016). Arun said it would be a mixed-genre film similar to Aruvi. The film's cast and crew were not revealed at the time. However, in June 2019, Arun's cousin, actor Sivakarthikeyan, instead announced Arun Prabhu's project officially as his third venture for Sivakarthikeyan Productions. The first look poster was released on 27 June 2019 revealing the film's title as Vaazhl. Cinematography was handled by Shelly Callist and editing by Raymond Derrick Crasta, both of whom did the same for Aruvi.

Arun Prabu revealed that Vaazhl was written in 2010, long before the release of Aruvi and was intended to be his directorial debut but was delayed due to the unconventional nature of the script; he said that the "script is quite complicated and it's definitely not an easy process to transform it completely on screen". He narrated the script to around thirty-five producers who liked his narration but questioned its execution. At one point he narrated the script to Sivakarthikeyan who was surprised with Arun Prabu's vision and when the project materialised, he gave him complete freedom to make the film the way Arun Prabu had intended.

=== Casting and filming ===
Arun Prabu stated that the film would have newcomers in the lead roles who had no experience in acting as he believed "non-professional actors can add more value" to the script. He cast Pradeep Antony, whom had a brief role in Aruvi, as the lead character Prakash who was based on a real-life friend of Arun Prabu sharing a similar name. He admitted that the film had several "non-filmy characters" something unusual for audiences who watch mainstream films. TJ Bhanu and Diva Dhawan were cast in the debut female lead roles, along with a nonagenarian actor SN Bhatt playing an important role.

For the pre-production, Arun Prabu and his team went on a recce for the location scouting which took them nine months. The film began production in January 2019 and was shot in 100 unexplored locations. Filming locations included the Indian states of Tamil Nadu, Kerala and Karnataka, and islands in Indonesia and Papua New Guinea. Arun revealed that different cameras were used to shoot different portions of the screenplay. For a small portion set in the 1930s, the makers used a film camera, feeling that was the best way to authentically show that time period. Filming, which took place in 75 working days, wrapped in mid-July 2019, although dubbing works began only that October.

== Themes and influences ==
Arun Prabu considered Vaazhl a travel film, reminiscing a universal question of who truly they are for an individual thus becoming an external and an internal journey throughout the film and its characters. He basically began with an idea with a simple introduction and how a person frees himself right from the beginning. Arun Prabu provided a surreal ending of the film, as he considered literature as a fiction, and surreality is the popular literature among the world despite its complexity, adding that the favourite moments in literary were boundaries that are broken and the reader experienced something new. He chose the ending as that surreal way to inflict that the lead character had broken his boundaries.

== Soundtrack ==
The film's music is composed by singer-composer Pradeep Kumar with lyrics written by Muthamil, Kutti Revathi, Arun Prabu and Pradeep himself. Like the director's previous film Aruvi, the music was designed during the pre-production stage itself, with recording happened at the Cincinnati orchestra in United States, during July 2018. Two songs—"Aahaa" and "Feel Song"—were released as singles on 7 September 2020 and 27 January 2021, respectively, while the album was released under the Sony Music India label on 9 July.

== Release ==
In May 2021, it was reported that the makers of Vaazhl were negotiating with the streaming service SonyLIV for the film to directly release there due to COVID-19 related cinema closures. The film eventually released there on 16 July.

== Reception ==
=== Critical response ===
Thinkal Menon of The Times of India gave the film 3 out of 5 and stated that the film "emphasises the need to explore life and live for today" and "might appeal to those who love motivational and travel flicks". Ramya Palisetty of India Today gave the film 3 out of 5 and said "Vaazhl has a good story at its heart but it somehow fails in execution. Nevertheless, it has its moments when you are lost in nature and its beauty." Baradwaj Rangan of Film Companion wrote "When you come away from the film, despite it's [sic] very minor faults, its with the satisfaction of having seen something with a superb sense of cinematic craft and storytelling courage — which is the most important thing."

Vivek M V of Deccan Herald considered the film to be inferior than Aruvi because of the protagonist's character being weakly written, but however concluded, "Vaazhl could resonate with travel lovers. It tells us to travel 30 days a year. One might argue that it's easier said than done. Perhaps the film wants you to explore the idea instead of pondering about it." Sify gave the film 3 out of 5 stars saying "Vaazhl is a well made feel-good film that will motivate us to travel more and most importantly encourages us to live only for today and not to worry about tomorrow."

Manoj Kumar R. of The Indian Express gave 3.5 out of 5 stars with a review: "Vaazhl is a product of personal filmmaking. It is smart, funny and even hallucinatory. The philosophical theme and the existential questions that the film tackles are not unheard of. But, the way Arun navigates this familiar territory of spiritual quest with a burst of colourful and soothing images with composer Pradeep Kumar’s meditative score keeps us invested in the narration." Sudhir Srinivasan of The New Indian Express wrote "Even if this film isn’t as satisfying as the director’s debut, Aruvi, director Arun Prabhu Purushothaman shows that he isn’t here to make easy films. And that single realisation gives you more happiness than the film did."

In contrast, Ranjani Krishnakumar of Firstpost gave the film 2.5 out of 5 stars saying "Vaazhl lacks self-awareness, only engaging with the romanticised idea of nature". Haricharan Pudipeddi of Hindustan Times wrote "Vaazhl feels stretched towards the end when it tries hard to pack in too much. It sometimes feels superficial but nevertheless manages to make an impact with its intended message. It makes interesting observations about an abusive relationship and how most women are unable to free themselves. The pleasant visuals and good music make up for most of the film’s dull moments." Srivatsan S of The Hindu called the film lacks the spine that knits its rather non-linearity in a cohesive manner" and further added that "Arun Prabu tries to defy the framework of a screenplay. In doing so, it ends up looking like a science experiment gone wrong".

=== Accolades ===
Date of ceremony (Note: Date is linked to the article about the awards held that year, wherever possible.)	Category	Recipient(s) and nominee(s)	Result	Ref.
10th South Indian International Movie Awards	Best Lyricist – Tamil	Arun Prabu Purushothaman – ("Inba Visai")	Nominated	
10th South Indian International Movie Awards	Best Male Playback Singer – Tamil	Pradeep Kumar – ("Naan")	Nominated	
