= Meendum Oru Kaathal Kathai =

1985 film by Prathap K. Pothan

- Poster
- Directed by: Pratap Pothen
- Written by: Pratap Pothen; Somasundareshwar
- Produced by: Radikaa
- Starring: Pratap Pothen; Radikaa
- Cinematography: P. C. Sreeram
- Edited by: B. Lenin
- Music by: Ilaiyaraaja
- Production company: Artiste Corporation
- Release date: 15 February 1985
- Running time: 130 minutes
- Country: India
- Language: Tamil

Meendum Oru Kaathal Kathai (transl. Yet Another Love Story) is a 1985 Indian Tamil-language romance film directed by Pratap Pothen in his debut and co-written by Somasundareshwar. The film stars Pratap and Radikaa. It revolves around the relationship between two mentally challenged people.

The soundtrack was composed by Ilaiyaraaja. The cinematography and editing were handled by P. C. Sreeram and B. Lenin respectively. At the 32nd National Film Awards, the film won the award for Best Debut Film of a Director. It was theatrically released on 15 February 1985.

== Plot ==
Sarasu, born to a rich eccentric businessman Badrinath, is a mentally challenged child. Unable to cope with her condition, Badrinath admits her in a home for such children and is taken care by a Christian Missionary principal and a guardian Juju Thatha, a kind old man. Sarasu meets Ganapathi "Guppi", another intellectually challenged orphan and they strike a rare affection for each other and become inseparable.

Year pass by Badrinath and his wife come to take Sarasu for their son's wedding engagement. Sarasu innocently insists that Guppi should also accompany her and Guppi is reluctantly accommodated at the insistence of the principal.

At the wedding party, Guppi and Sarasu bump into the engaged couple and notice their clandestine affair. Sarasu insists her parents to get her married with Guppi. In a weird twist of things, the idea appeals to the guests and Badrinath agrees and Sarasu and Guppi's marriage takes place.

Guppi and Sarasu are sent to Korakunda, a mountain village along with Juju Thathta as their guardian. Korakunda is an unusual village inhabited by strange people; Manohar, the photographer with a vintage tumbled-down box camera who specialises in taking the photos of the dead for the bereaved; Nylux Nalini, a footloose woman who has illicit affairs, Kitney, a person who files kites, the village headman and a few others.

Guppi and Sarasu get into a physical relationship and Sarasu becomes pregnant. One day in the woods, the drunken village headman tries to molest Sarasu. Guppi, who sees it, fights and kills him. Guppi is condemned to life in prison. Sarasu, separated from Guppi is in distressed agony. She is admitted for delivery in a hospital and Guppi, on special permission visits her. In their own innocent way, they try to relive their past happier moments. She dies delivering a baby.

Guppi, unable to understand death, tries to revive Sarasu and when he fails and finds her motionless, snatches the newly born child and flashes the sharp edge of the blood-bottle menacingly at others. But he is quickly overwhelmed and taken back to prison, where he dies a few years later.

== Cast ==
- Pratap Pothen as Ganapathi "Guppi"
- Radikaa as Sarasu
- Charuhasan as the Christian missionary principal
- Y. G. Mahendran as Manohar
- Kannan as Sarasu's brother
- Dakshinamurthy as Badrinath
- Ronnie Patel as Juju Thatha

== Production ==
It was a gem of a thought. Who exactly is mad? It's a question of relative madness. I plumped in for two retardeds [sic]. I thought I'd get them married and make them discover love, almost like Adam and Eve. They don't know about sex.

— Pratap Pothen, on the film's origins

Meendum Oru Kaathal Kathai marked the directorial debut of Pratap Pothen. He said that he "could find no lead actor for it, so I did it myself." Pratap portrayed negative roles in Telugu films in order to raise funds for the film. The script was co-written by Somasundareshwar. He recalled that during the sets of Panneer Pushpangal (1981), Pratap promised him that he would direct a film based on his script. The cinematography was handled by P. C. Sreeram. The film was launched at Prasad Studios in 1982 along with song recording. The film was shot over the period of a year. Ronnie Patel, a part of Madras Players crew, made his screen debut with this film. During the film's production, Pratap and Radikaa fell in love and married; however they got divorced in 1986. The filming was primarily held at Porthi near Ooty.

== Soundtrack ==
The soundtrack was composed by Ilaiyaraaja and the lyrics were written by Gangai Amaran.

Track listing
No.	Title	Singer(s)	Length
1.	"Adhikaalai Nerame"	S. P. Balasubrahmanyam, S. Janaki	04:01
2.	"Aathadi"	S. P. Balasubrahmanyam	04:12
3.	"Azhagana Indha"	Gangai Amaran	04:36
4.	"Devan Sabayiley"	Kalyan	04:13
5.	"Kutti Onnu"	Saibaba	04:38
Total length:			21:40

== Critical reception ==
Balumani of Anna praised the acting, cinematography and direction.

== Accolades ==
At the 32nd National Film Awards, the film won the award for Best Debut Film of a Director.

== Bibliography ==
- Dhananjayan, G. (2014). Pride of Tamil Cinema: 1931–2013. Blue Ocean Publishers. OCLC 898765509.
