= Arun Prabu =

Tamil film director

- Born: 14 June 1989 (age 36)
- Occupations: Film director, writer, actor
- Relatives: Sivakarthikeyan (cousin)

Arun Prabu Purushothaman is an Indian film director and former actor who works in Tamil cinema. He is known for directing Aruvi.

== Early life and career ==
Arun Prabu studied Visual Communication at Loyola College, Chennai.

He began his film career as a television actor, appearing in the soap opera Annamalai. He has been coached by director Balu Mahendra, and has worked as an assistant director to K. S. Ravikumar in the film Manmadan Ambu. In 2013, Arun Prabu began writing the script for Aruvi, which was subsequently directed by him and released as his first film in 2017. He received critical praise for the film's direction. His second film, Vaazhl has been in production since 2019 and was released in 2021.

== Filmography ==
Key
†	Denotes films that have not yet been released

As director

Year	Film	Notes
2017	Aruvi	Directorial debut
2021	Vaazhl	
2025	Shakthi Thirumagan	

As actor

Year	Title	Role	Notes	Ref.
2002-2005	Annamalai	Sivakumar	Sun TV serial	
2003	Chokka Thangam	young Muthu	Special appearance in the song "Vellaiyai Manam"	

== Awards and nominations ==
Year (Note: Refers to the year in which the ceremony was held.)	Award	Category	Film	Result	Ref.
2018	Ananda Vikatan Cinema Awards	Best Debut Director	Aruvi	Won	
2018	Edison Awards	Best Debut Director	Aruvi	Won	
2018	Filmfare Awards South	Best Director – Tamil	Aruvi	Nominated	
2018	South Indian International Movie Awards	Best Director - Tamil	Aruvi	Nominated	
2018	South Indian International Movie Awards	Best Debut Director - Tamil	Aruvi	Won	
2018	Vijay Awards	Best Story	Aruvi	Nominated	
2018	Vijay Awards	Best Screenplay	Aruvi	Nominated	
2018	Vijay Awards	Best Debut Director	Aruvi	Nominated	
2022	South Indian International Movie Awards	Best Lyricist (Tamil)	Vaazhl	Nominated	
