= Aditi Balan =

Indian actress

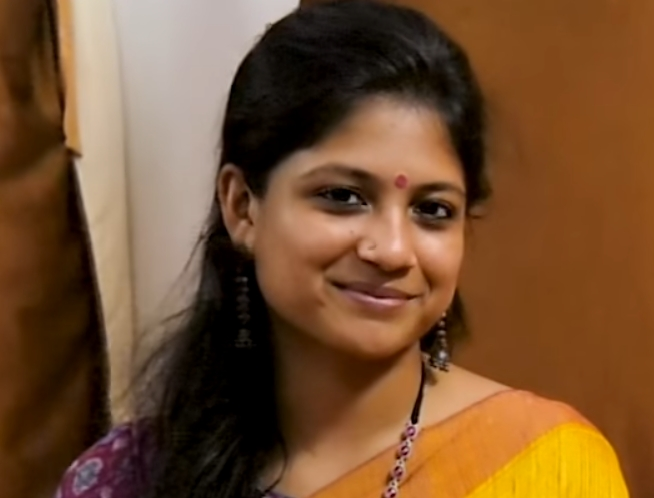
- Aditi Balan in 2017
- Born: Chennai, Tamil Nadu, India
- Occupations: Actress; dancer; model; Advocate
- Years active: 2015–present

Aditi Balan is an Indian actress who mainly works in Tamil and Malayalam films. Originally an advocate, she is best known for playing the titular role in the film Aruvi. Her performance in the film is regarded as one of the "100 Greatest Performances of the Decade" by Film Companion.

== Career ==
In 2017 she got the opportunity to play a lead role in the film, Aruvi. It was one of the biggest hits in 2017, and her performance was unanimously praised by critics. She received many accolades for Aruvi including Filmfare Critics Award for Best Actress – Tamil. In 2024, she acted in the Telugu film Saripodhaa Sanivaaram.

== Filmography ==
Key
†	Denotes films that have not yet been released

=== Films ===
List of films and roles
Year	Title	Role	Language	Notes	Ref.
2015	Yennai Arindhaal	Hemanika's student	Tamil	Uncredited role	
2017	Aruvi	Aruvi	Tamil	Debut in Lead Role	
2021	Kutty Story	Kuchu	Tamil	Segment: Aadal Paadal	
2021	Cold Case	Medha Padmaja	Malayalam	Debut in Malayalam cinema	
2022	Padavettu	Shyma	Malayalam		
2023	Shaakuntalam	Priyamvada	Telugu	Debut in Telugu cinema	
2023	Karumegangal Kalaigindrana	Kanmani	Tamil		
2023	Vela		Malayalam		
2024	Captain Miller	Princess Shakunthala	Tamil		
2024	Saripodhaa Sanivaaram	Bhadra	Telugu		
2024	Lineman	Collector	Tamil	Cameo appearance	
2026	G.D.N	Padmavathi	Tamil		
2026	Bouma		Malayalam		

=== Television ===
List of web series and roles
Year	Web Series	Role	Network	Notes	Ref.
2021	Navarasa	Bhagyalakshmi	Netflix	Segment: Payasam	
2023	Story of Things	Vannamayil	SonyLIV	Segment: Cellular	
2026	Exam	Maramalli	Amazon Prime Video		
TBA	Chennai Crime Files †	TBA	JioHotstar		

== Awards and nominations ==
List of awards and nominations
Year (Note: Refers to the year in which the ceremony was held.)	Award	Category	Film	Result	Ref.
2018	Ananda Vikatan Cinema Awards	Best Debut Actress	Aruvi	Won	
2018	Edison Awards	Best Debut Actress	Aruvi	Won	
2018	Filmfare Awards South	Best Actress – Tamil	Aruvi	Nominated	
2018	Filmfare Awards South	Critics Best Actress – Tamil	Aruvi	Won	
2018	Norway Tamil Film Festival Awards	Best Actress	Aruvi	Won	
2018	South Indian International Movie Awards	Best Actress – Tamil	Aruvi	Nominated	
2018	South Indian International Movie Awards	Best Debut Actress – Tamil	Aruvi	Nominated	
2018	South Indian International Movie Awards	Best Actress (Critics) – Tamil	Aruvi	Won	
2018	Techofes Awards	Best Debut Female	Aruvi	Won	
2018	Vijay Awards	Best Debut Actress	Aruvi	Won	
