= Kutti Revathi =

Indian poet

Revathy Suyambulingam
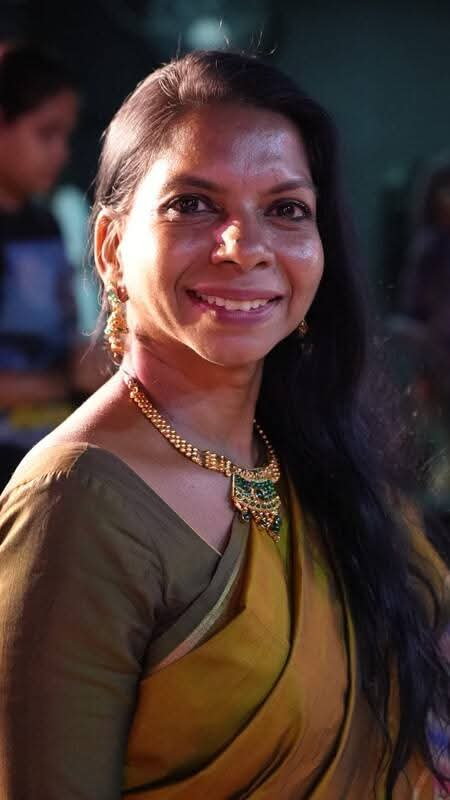
- Born: 1974 (age 51–52); Malaikoil, Thiruverumbur, Tiruchirappalli, Tamil Nadu, India
- Occupations: Poet, lyricist, activist, Siddha doctor
- Writing career
- Years active: 1999–present
- Website: kuttirevathi.com

Revathy Suyambulingam (pen name: Kutti Revathi; born 1974) is an Indian lyricist, poet, activist and doctor. Chosen by poetry specialists at the Southbank Centre, her poetry "Breasts" (originally Mulaigal in Tamil) was listed as one of the Fifty Greatest Modern Love Poems. She has published over 40 books of poetry and is the editor of Panikkudam, a literary quarterly for women's writing and also the first Tamil feminist magazine. Post several literary meetings and reviewing poetry collections by fellow students, she began working on some of her own pieces.

Notably, she has made a full-length documentary on three thousand years history of Tamil Music, “Abraham Pandithar’s Karunamirthasagaram” for AR Rahman Foundation. She has been spearheading a website on the same focus for AR Rahman foundation.

== Life ==
Following school, she pursued her bachelor's degree in Siddha medicine and surgery at Palayamkottai Government Siddha Medical College. She had been pursuing her doctoral research in medical anthropology at the Madras Institute of Development Studies in Chennai. Revathi received the Sigaram 15: Faces of Future award for literature from India Today and was awarded a travel grant in 2005 by the Sahitya Akademi to meet leading litterateurs from India and she met Mahashweta Devi through the grant.

She is a contemporary Tamil poet and her poetry "Mulaigal" (Breasts) is a groundbreaking and highly debated poetry collection. Published in 2002, the book explores women’s bodily autonomy, sexuality, and lived experiences, using nature and the female form as symbols of liberation and resistance against patriarchal censorship.

== Poems and Literature ==
This body of work spans more than two decades and is widely recognized for its exploration of the female body, desire, memory, language, history, caste, war, ecology, and the politics of gender in contemporary Tamil society. Through a distinctive poetic voice, Kutti Revathi has emerged as an influential figures in modern Tamil literature.

Short Story Collections

- நிறைய அறைகள் உள்ள வீடு (The House with Many Rooms, 2013)
- விரல்கள் (Fingers, 2018)
- மீமொழி (Meta-Language, 2020)
- இயக்கம் (Movement, 2020)
- நூறாயிரம் சொற்கள் - தொன்மச் சிறுகதைகள் (One Hundred Thousand Words: Mythic Short Stories, 2021)
- மிகை - குறுங்கதைகள் (Excess, 2023)
- ஊன் வளர்த்தாள் உயிர் வளர்த்தாளே (She Nurtured the Flesh. She Nurtured Life, 2023)
- தனிமையின் வெளி (The Space of Solitude, 2025)

Kutti Revathi's writing extends to literary explorations of gender, memory, mythology, embodiment, language, and social transformation. These works are distinguished by their experimental narrative forms, feminist perspectives, and engagement with the intersections of history, mythology, and contemporary life.

Panikkudam is the first Tamil feminist magazine of her claimed varied aspects such as family, politics, business, discovery of feminine language, introducing modern play, novels, short stories and poetry created by women writers.

Interviews of women writers, introduction to modern poetry and short stories, translations of such works into Tamil from World languages, discussions of the creative process and sangam literature were some of the elements that made the part of the magazine. In the field of poetry, her first release in the year 2000 was Poonaiyai Pola Alaiyum Velicham.

Kutti Revathi's second book, Mulaigal that was published in 2002, controversy from the conservatives of the Tamil literary establishment. A group of outraged male film lyricists damned the book. The debate extended to parameters of cultural debate: obscene calls, letters and threats ensued, and comments on the author's morality were freely aired. While one lyricist demanded that writers of her types must watch out for dire consequences, the other exhorted the public to burn them on Chennai's Mount Road. However she explained, "My aim is to explore 'Mulaigal' (breasts) as an 'inhabited' living reality, rather than an 'exhibited' commodity." Adjoint to the content, an essay titled "With Words I Weave My Body", she discussed the ways in which a patriarchal tradition, fearful of sharing the power of the written word, compelled women to imprint narratives on their bodies. Her third release was Thanimaiyin Aayiram Irakkaigal in 2003.

In 2007 the English translation of her poetry Body's Door was released. Shattered Boundaries another collection of her poems in English translation was released in 2012.

In September 2014, Kutti Revathi travelled to Denmark to represent Tamil poetry at REVERSE – Copenhagen International Poetry Festival. Sharing the stage with leading international poets, she brought contemporary Tamil feminist poetry to a global audience. During her visit, she also participated in discussions on body politics, female identity, and poetry as a tool for social transformation.

Poetry Collections by Kutti Revathi

- Poonaiaip Pola Alaiyum Velicham (Light Wandering Like a Cat) (2000)
- Mulaigal (Breasts) (2002)
- Thanimaiyin Aayiram Irakkaigal (A Thousand Wings of Solitude) (2003)
- Udalin Kathavu (The Door of the Body) (2006)
- Yaanumitta Thee (The Fire I Kindled) (2011)
- Muthathin Alagu (The Measure of a Kiss) – A Collection of Love Poems (2011)
- Maamatha Yaanai (The Great Elephant) (2012)
- Idintha Karai (The Eroded Shore) (2012)
- Agavan Magal (Daughter of the Inner World) (2013)
- Kaalavega Mathayaanai (The Elephant of Time's Velocity) (2016)
- Agamugam (The Inner Face) (2017)
- Meendum Kandedukkappadum (To Be Rediscovered) (2018)
- Moovaa Marundhu (The Immortal Medicine) (2019)
- Dravida Arasi / Pennudal Ennum Thonmam (Dravidian Queen / The Myth of the Woman's Body) (2020)
- Heraclitus Nadhi (Heraclitus River) – Long Poem
- Indha Puvikku Unthan Peyariduven (I Will Name This Earth After You) (2024)
- Oliyin Mugam (The Face of Light) (2025)
- Kangalin Oli (The Light of the Eyes) (2026)
- Nuzhaivaayilena Oru Nilaikannadi (A Standing Mirror as a Threshold) – Digital Poetry Collection
- Moovayiram Aandu Kaadhal Mozhigal (Three Thousand Years of Languages of Love)
- Puliyum Pulipolaagiya Puliyum (The Tiger and the Tiger that Became a Tiger) – Experimental Poetry Collection
- Mullivaikkaalukku Pin (After Mullivaikkal) - An anthology of memorial poems on the Tamil genocide in Sri Lanka, written by Eelam Tamil poets in exile (Editor, 2011)
- Muththathin Alagu (Love Poems)

== Cinema ==
Revathi became a part of the 2013 film Maryan when the film's director Bharatbala wanted a Tamil scholar to work on the script. For the same film's soundtrack album, she wrote lyrics of the melancholic song "Yenga Pona Raasa" and the most popular song "Nenje Ezhu". Upon the musical success of the album especially both the tracks, her lyrical styles were critically applauded. She wrote the lyrics for the song "Ennile Maha Oliyo" that was aired on MTV Coke Studio (India). And She also has written a song for the music scored by Oscar composer AR Rahman in Tamil Version of the film MOM directed by Ravi Udyawar.

Have also written lyrics for the songs in the successful films, Maya directed by Ashwin Saravanan, & 8 Thottakkal directed by Sri Ganesh. She made her directorial debut with the film Siragu.

== Filmography ==
- She directed a short film, ‘Agamugam’ (The Inner Face), 2022 – Short Film - 5 minutes. Shot entirely on an iPhone. Honoured with the Best Short Film Award at the A.R. Rahman Foundation’s Short Film Festival. Official Selection, IAWRT Chapter India’s Asian Women’s Festival 2023 (18th Edition), as part of the iTales Anthology.
- She also directed, ‘Kodai Irul’ (Darkness of Summer) – Feature Film, 84 min, 2023. A poignant cinematic journey into the hidden world of India’s most ancient Irula tribes - snake catching tribes. World Premiere: Chennai International Film Festival 2023. International Premiere: BRICS 2024, Moscow International Film Festival. Opening Film: 10th Jaffna International Film Festival – Debut Film Competition. Official Selection: Panchajanyam Film Festival, Kerala, 2024.
- Directed Siragu (Wing) – Feature Film, 2019; Produced by Mala Manyan, First Copy Productions.

Premiered at NTFF, Norway, 2023.

- Directed, VANJI (2025), The story of Tamil Epic Kundalakesi, Placed in the time 7th century. - Produced by Bala Swaminathan, Tamil & Tamilar Diaspora Foundation & Bheem Movies. Vanji was officially screened at Cannes 2026 Marché du Film

== Documentaries ==
- Looking Through the Glass (2002) - A documentary on the legendary poet Kamala Das.
- The Silence of a Withering Tree (2003) - A visual poetry film.
- Kal Manithargal (2009) - A documentary on the harsh realities and silent struggles of stone quarry workers across Tamil Nadu.A powerful testament to resilience amid exploitation, capturing the rhythm of lives shaped by stone and survival.
- Naadu Kaan Kaathai (2010) - A travelogue–documentary on Kannagi, created for the World Storytelling Institute.
- Withered Wings (2010) - A testimonial documentary made for women from a Chennai-based corporate.
- Change Paper (2010) - A Tamil-language documentary for People’s Development Initiative (Salem & Trichy) in collaboration with Implicados, Galicia (Spain).Co-directed and produced by Maria Reimóndez, Luis Tosar, and Kutti Revathi.
- ‘Abraham Pandithar’s Karunamirthasagaram’, - in the making. A three hour long documentary for AR Rahman Foundation. A 3000 year history of Thamizh music. Yet to be released.

She was featured in "She Write" (2005), an acclaimed documentary film directed by the filmmaker duo Anjali Monteiro and K.P. Jayasankar. The documentary focuses on the lives, politics, and creative journeys of four contemporary Tamil women poets.

== See also ==
- 2003 in poetry
- 2002 in poetry
