= Nassar filmography and awards =

This is a filmography of Nassar, an Indian actor, director, dubbing artist and playback singer. As an actor, he has credits in over 550 films, of which 340 have been in Tamil films and 150 in Telugu films.

== As an actor ==
Key
†	Denotes films that have not yet been released

=== Films ===
==== Tamil ====
Year	Title	Role	Notes
1985	Kalyana Agathigal	Kannayiram	
1986	Pudhiya Pookal	Prakash	
1986	Kadalora Kolangal	Ganesh	
1987	Velaikaran	Poundraj	
1987	Kadamai Kanniyam Kattupaadu	Reporter	
1987	Kavithai Paada Neramillai		
1987	Vanna Kanavugal		
1987	Kani Nilam		
1987	Nayakan	Assistant Commissioner	
1987	Pasam Oru Vesam		
1988	Naan Sonnathey Sattam		
1988	Oray Thaai Oray Kulam		
1988	Paasa Paravaigal		
1988	Poovum Puyalum		
1988	Rendum Rendum Anju		
1988	Kadarkarai Thaagam		
1988	Manasukkul Mathappu	Babu	
1988	En Thangachi Padichava	Dhanakodi	
1988	Naan Sonnathey Sattam		
1988	Unnal Mudiyum Thambi	Wine shop owner	
1988	Dharmathin Thalaivan	Raghupathy	
1988	Sathyaa	Seena Thaana	
1988	Paravaigal Palavitham		
1988	Puthiya Vaanam		
1989	En Purushanthaan Enakku Mattumthaan		
1989	Apoorva Sagodharargal	Nallasivam	
1989	Pudhea Paadhai		
1989	Sondhakkaran		
1989	Kai Veesamma Kai Veesu		
1989	Oru Thottil Sabadham		
1989	Chinnappadass		
1989	Nyaya Tharasu		
1989	En Thangai		
1989	Sariyana Jodi		
1989	Vaathiyaar Veettu Pillai	Gowri's husband	
1990	Kavalukku Kettikaran	Siva	
1990	Pachai Kodi	Vishwanath	
1990	Unnai Solli Kutramillai	Kumar	
1990	Amma Pillai		
1990	Maruthu Pandi	Thiagarajan	
1990	Inaindha Kaigal	P. K. Roy	
1990	Michael Madana Kama Rajan	Ramgopal	
1990	Sathya Vaakku		
1990	Raja Kaiya Vacha	Johnny	
1990	Pudhiya Sarithiram		
1991	Eeramana Rojave		
1991	Gopura Vasalile		
1991	Marikozhundhu		
1991	Maanagara Kaaval		
1991	Jenma Natchathram	Father	
1991	Onnum Theriyatha Pappa		
1991	Eeshwari		
1991	Rasathi Varum Naal	Rajasekhar	
1992	Chembaruthi	Murugan	
1992	Unnai Vaazhthi Paadugiren	Asha's father	
1992	Sevagan	Ashok	
1992	Yermunai		
1992	Aavarampoo	Thevar	
1992	Roja	Colonel Rayappa	
1992	Thalaivasal	Beeda Settu	
1992	Ellaichami	Minor Muthurasu	
1992	Thevar Magan	Maya Thevar	
1992	Kaviya Thalaivan	Pradeep	
1992	Thirumathi Palanisamy		
1992	Mr. Prasad		
1992	Meera	Village Head	
1993	Jathi Malli		
1993	Walter Vetrivel	Rayappa	
1993	Chinna Kannamma	Pradeep	
1993	Enga Thambi	Dinakar	
1993	Kalaignan	Police detective	
1993	Amaravathi	Frank	
1993	Pudhiya Mugam	ACP Shekar IPS	
1993	Maathangal Ezhu	Raghu	
1993	Sakkarai Devan	Vaiyapuri	
1993	Athma	Hari	
1993	Udan Pirappu	Ameer Bhai	
1993	Karuppu Vellai		
1993	Kilipetchu Ketkava		
1993	Kathirukka Neramillai	Chatterjee	
1993	Airport	Varma	
1994	Rajakumaran	Yuvaraj	
1994	Magalir Mattum	Pandian	
1994	Varavu Ettana Selavu Pathana	Sivaraman	
1994	Priyanka	Rudrayya	
1994	Vietnam Colony	Sulaiman Sait	
1994	Pudhusa Pootha Roosa		
1994	Pavithra	Raghunathan	
1995	Indira	Sethupathy	
1995	Bombay	Narayanan Pillai	
1995	Avatharam	Kuppusamy	
1995	Kolangal		
1995	Kuruthipunal	Badri	
1995	Dear Son Maruthu	Vijay	
1996	Aruva Velu	Velu	
1996	Krishna	Dharmaraj	
1996	Avvai Shanmughi	Basha	
1997	Iruvar	Ayya Veluthambi	
1997	Minsara Kanavu	Guru	
1997	Kaalamellam Kadhal Vaazhga	Hariharan	
1997	Devathai	Shasangan	
1998	Kaadhale Nimmadhi		
1998	Kizhakkum Merkkum	Kathalingam	
1998	Velai		
1998	Jeans	Nachiappan and Pechiappan Rajamani	
1998	Priyamudan	CBI officer	
1998	Poonthottam		
1998	Desiya Geetham	Chief Minister	
1999	Poovellam Kettuppar	Kannan	
1999	Ethirum Pudhirum	Veeraiyan	
1999	Padayappa	Suryaprakash	
1999	Kadhalar Dhinam	Ramachandra	
1999	Viralukketha Veekkam	Gayatri husband	
1999	Amarkkalam	Birla Bose	
1999	Jodi	Rudramurthy	
1999	Mugam	Rangan	
2000	Eazhaiyin Sirippil	Owner of Padmavathi Bus Service	
2000	Annai		
2000	Sudhandhiram	Sathyamoorthy	
2000	Hey Ram	Police	
2000	Sandhitha Velai		
2000	Unnai Kodu Ennai Tharuven	Camp Brigadier	
2000	Koodi Vazhnthal Kodi Nanmai	Thangaraj	
2000	Krodham 2	Rathnavel	
2000	Chinna Chinna Kannile	Ravi	
2000	Karuvelam Pookkal	Nallamuthu	
2000	Manuneedhi	Vellaiyan	
2001	Vaanchinathan	Lawyer Babu Rao Patel	
2001	Little John	Police inspector	
2001	Dhill	Commissioner	
2001	Narasimha	Manavalan	
2001	Kutty	Pavadai	
2001	Maayan	Maayan	
2001	Thavasi	Sankarapandi	
2002	Raajjiyam		
2002	Kadhal Virus	Himself	
2002	Thamizh	Rathnam	
2002	Thamizhan	Sakthivl	
2002	Samurai	Sandana Pandian	
2002	Baba	Suryaprakash	
2002	King	Shanmugam	
2002	Virumbugiren		
2003	Anbe Sivam	Kandhasamy Padaiyachi	
2003	Vaseegara	Vishwanathan	
2003	Aasai Aasaiyai		
2003	Student Number 1		
2003	Pudhiya Geethai	Sarathy's father	
2003	Inidhu Inidhu Kadhal Inidhu		
2003	Nala Damayanthi	Himself	Cameo appearance
2003	Aahaa Ethanai Azhagu		
2003	Thithikudhe	Jeeva's adopted father	
2003	Vikadan		
2003	Thennavan	Ilanthiraiyan	
2003	Alai		
2003	Kurumbu	Ruchi's father	
2004	Kovil	Michael Susai	
2004	Virumaandi	Jayanth	
2004	Varnajalam	Devanathan	
2004	Udhaya	Dhananjay Veeran	
2004	Vaanam Vasappadum		
2004	New	Priya's father	
2004	Arasatchi		
2004	Neranja Manasu		
2004	Jananam	Shekhar	
2005	Devathayai Kanden	Advocate	
2005	Sukran	Ravi Shankar	
2005	Gurudeva	Maari	
2005	Chandramukhi	Kandaswamy	
2005	Mumbai Xpress	Poorna Pragna Rao	
2005	Anniyan	Psychiatrist Vijaykumar	
2006	Paramasivan	Vetrivel	
2006	Pasa Kiligal	Vairaghya Bhoopathy	
2006	Aathi	Ramachandra	
2006	Dishyum	Jayachandran	
2006	Idhaya Thirudan	Aalwar	
2006	Aacharya	Annavi Thevar	
2006	Naalai	Nair	
2006	Imsai Arasan 23am Pulikesi	Sangilimaayan	
2006	Yuga	Narendra	
2006	Emtan Magan	Thirumalai	
2006	Perarasu	Sadhasivam	
2006	Vattaram	Burma's father	
2006	Suyetchai MLA	Arivudaiyan	
2006	Nenjirukkum Varai		
2007	Pokkiri	Shanmugavel	
2007	Thamirabharani	Vellathurai	
2007	Muni		
2007	Viyabari	Dr. Stephen Raj	
2007	Parattai Engira Azhagu Sundaram	Bhai	
2007	Thiru Ranga	Rayappan	
2007	Thottal Poo Malarum	Thyagarajan	
2007	Marudhamalai	Marudhamalai's father	
2007	Thirutham		
2007	Satham Podathey	Vincent Selvakumar	
2007	Nam Naadu	Aalavandhar	
2007	Nenjai Thodu		
2007	Agra	Kannan	
2007	Vel	Vel's adoptive father	
2007	Onbadhu Roobai Nottu	Hajabhai	
2008	Indiralohathil Na Azhagappan	Naradhar	
2008	Kuruvi	Raj	
2008	Pandi	Sundarapandi	
2008	Kaalaippani	JKR	
2008	Aayudham Seivom		
2008	Poi Solla Porom	Baby	
2008	Netru Indru Naalai	Dharmanna	
2008	Aegan	Karthikeyan	
2008	Ellam Avan Seyal		
2008	Panchamirtham	Rajaram, Manickam	
2009	Kadhalna Summa Illai	GK	
2009	Mariyadhai	Solaiyu Muthurajah	
2009	Indira Vizha	John Kumaramangalam	
2009	Ainthaam Padai	Gunasekaran	
2009	Kumari Pennin Ullathile		
2010	Irumbu Kottai Murattu Singam	Kizhakku Kattai	
2010	Kutti Pisasu	British man	
2010	Magane En Marumagane	Jameendar	
2010	Singam	Mahalingam	
2010	Madrasapattinam	Ayyakannu	
2010	Virunthali	Ishvar's father	
2010	Irandu Mugam	Sakthi	
2010	Vandae Maatharam		
2010	Naane Ennul Illai		
2010	Nandalala	Lorry Driver	
2010	Aattanayagann	Lingam's father	
2011	Ilaignan	Arokkyasami	
2011	Ponnar Shankar	Mayavar	
2011	Deiva Thirumagal	Bashiyam	
2011	Sankarankovil		
2011	Aduthathu		
2011	Osthe	Subbaiah Pillai	
2011	Uchithanai Muharnthaal	Deivanayagam	
2011	Maharaja	Mahadevan	
2012	Vettai	DGP	
2012	Dhoni	Cricket coach	
2012	Muppozhudhum Un Karpanaigal	Priest	
2012	Nanda Nanditha	Thug	
2012	Saguni	Nelly Saami	
2012	Mugamoodi	Gaurav	
2012	Thaandavam	Veerakathi Pillai	
2012	Sun Sun Thatha	Abi's father	
2013	David	Father Noel	
2013	Settai	Somayajulu	
2013	Vishwaroopam	Nassar	
2013	Gouravam	Soundarapandyan	
2013	Singam 2	Mahalingam	
2013	Neram	Dhandapaani	
2013	Thalaivaa	Ratnam	
2013	Vanakkam Chennai	Colonel Balasubramaniam	
2013	All in All Azhagu Raja	Burma/Paadai Ramasammy	
2013	Sutta Kadhai	Thirumeni	
2013	Pizza 2: The Villa	Marshall P Jones	
2013	Biriyani	Varadharajan	
2013	Endrendrum Punnagai	Sridhar	
2014	Veeram	Nallasivam	
2014	Nimirndhu Nil	Harichandra	
2014	Koottam	JK	
2014	Oru Kanniyum Moonu Kalavaanikalum	Hippy Lahiri	
2014	Kochadaiiyaan	Rishikodagan	
2014	Saivam	Kathiresan	
2014	Oru Oorla Rendu Raja	Selva Vinayagam	
2014	Kaaviya Thalaivan	Thavathiru Sivadas Swamigal	
2014	Thirumanam Enum Nikkah	Festival attendee	Cameo
2014	Yaan	Rajan	
2014	Jigarthanda	Mukil	
2014	Burma	Narrator	
2014	Appuchi Gramam	Chief minister	
2015	Manitha Kadhal Alla		
2015	Yennai Arindhaal	Sathyadev's father	
2015	Uttama Villain	Mutharasan	
2015	36 Vayadhinile	Rajan	
2015	Yagavarayinum Naa Kaakka	Commissioner Balachandar	
2015	Baahubali: The Beginning	Pingalathevan	
2015	Aavi Kumar	Mahendran	
2015	Idhu Enna Maayam	Arun's father	
2015	Thani Oruvan	Chief Minister	
2015	Savaale Samaali	Samuthirakani	
2016	Irudhi Suttru	Punch Pandian	
2016	Saagasam	Ravi's father	
2016	Jil Jung Juk	Nanjil Shivaji's (Jil) father	
2016	Kalam	Magician	
2016	Ko 2	Kumara Swamy	
2016	Paisa		
2016	Arthanari	Selvamanickam	
2016	Kabali	Tamilnesan	
2016	Tamilselvanum Thaniyar Anjalum	Sathyamoorthy	
2016	Mudinja Ivana Pudi	Commissioner Sharathkumar	
2016	Meendum Oru Kadhal Kadhai	Abdul Kader	
2016	Kuttrame Thandanai		
2016	Iru Mugan	Malik	
2016	Thodari		
2016	Aandavan Kattalai	Master	
2016	Devi	Spirit priest	
2017	Bogan	Chezhiyan	
2017	En Kadhal Devathai		
2017	Si3	Mahalingam	
2017	Vaigai Express	Inspector Mayilvahanan	
2017	Kavan	Police Commissioner	Guest appearance
2017	8 Thottakkal	Pandian	
2017	Baahubali 2: The Conclusion	Pingalathevan	
2017	7 Naatkal	Peter S. Kumar	
2017	Kootathil Oruthan	Gunaseelan	
2017	Magalir Mattum	Gothandaraman	
2017	Ka Ka Ka: Aabathin Arikuri	Deepthi's father	
2017	Valla Desam		
2017	Thittivasal	Ondamoopan	
2018	Keni	Advocate	
2018	Sometimes	Doctor	
2018	Bhaskar Oru Rascal	M. A. M. Rangasamy	
2018	Kaali	Thala Vatti Maari	
2018	Vishwaroopam 2	Nassar	
2018	Odu Raja Odu	Kali Muthu	
2018	Nota	Vinothan Subramaniam	
2018	Sei	Old Man	
2018	Utharavu Maharaja	M. Alagappan	
2018	Party	Benjamin Button	Unreleased
2019	Vantha Rajavathaan Varuven	Raghunandhan	
2019	Spot		
2019	Neerthirai	Basheer	
2019	Rocky: The Revenge	Police Commissioner Selvam	
2019	Kolaigaran	Retired Police Officer	
2019	100% Kadhal	Balu Mahendra	
2019	Azhiyatha Kolangal 2	Asst. Commissioner	
2019	Sangathamizhan	Devaraj	
2019	Market Raja MBBS	Sivaji Muthaiyah	
2020	Pattas	Muthaiah Aasaan	
2020	College Kumar	Santhosh Kumar	
2021	Master	College's founder	
2021	Kabadadaari	Ranjan	
2021	Chakra	Chandru's late father	
2021	Thalaivii	M. Karunanidhi	
2021	Erida	Shanker	
2022	Sila Nerangalil Sila Manidhargal	Selvaraj	
2022	Clap	Venkatraman	
2022	Hostel	Father Kuriakose	
2022	Vaaitha		
2022	1945	Subbayya	
2022	The Legend	Saravanan's Professor (Scientist)	
2022	Methagu 2		
2022	Kanam	Rangikutta Paul	
2022	Ponniyin Selvan: I	Veerapandiyan	
2023	Bagheera	Ganesan	
2023	Rudhran	Devaraj	
2023	Ponniyin Selvan: II	Veerapandiyan	
2023	800	Mugunthan Sathasivam	
2023	Kuttram Nadanthathu Enna?		
2023	Conjuring Kannappan	Ezhumalai	
2023	Vivesini	Jayaraman Kathirvelu	
2024	Kadaisi Ulaga Por	CM GNR	
2024	Thiru.Manickam	Bhai	
2025	Rajabheema	Raja's father	
2025	Test	ICF Member Ramasamy	
2025	Retro	Rajavel Mirasu	
2025	Thug Life	Rangaraaya "Manickam" Manickavel	
2025	Red Flower		
2025	Diesel	Chief Minister of Tamil Nadu	
2025	Aaryan	CM Gunasekharan	
2026	Oh Butterfly	Sagayam	
2026	Jana Nayagan	C.M Arivudai Nambi	
2026	Vishwanath & Sons	Ramanathan	
2026	Sardar 2	Quartermaster Shekhar Dattatri / Luthfudeen as young Shekhar Dattatri	
2026	Meesaya Murukku 2	Seshadri	

==== Telugu ====
Year	Title	Role	Notes
1990	Kokila	Anantha Swami / Saeed Iqbal	
1990	Muddula Menalludu	Madhava Rao	
1990	Neti Dowrjanyam	Pandu Seth	
1991	Stuvartpuram Dongalu		
1991	Maha Yagnam		
1992	Dharma Kshetram	S P	
1992	Chanti		
1992	Sahasam	Sanjay	
1992	Public Rowdy	Jagadeesh Chandra Prasad	
1993	Rakshana		
1993	Kaliyugam		
1993	Matru Devo Bhava	Satyam	
1994	Criminal	Teja	
1995	Aunty		
1996	Drohi	Badra	
1996	Akkada Ammayi Ikkada Abbayi	Harischandra Prasad	
1997	Aaro Pranam		
1998	Ooyala		
1998	Priyuralu		Dubbed in Malayalam as Manjeeradhwani
1999	Alludugaaru Vachcharu		
2000	Moodu Mukkalaata	Yugandhar Prasad	
2000	Vamsi	Ankineedu	
2000	Maa Annayya		
2000	Madhuri		
2001	Eduruleni Manishi		
2001	Kushi	Siddhu's father	
2002	Seshu	Seshu's brother	
2003	Naaga	Chief Minister	
2003	Neetho Vastha		
2003	Simhadri	Ram Bhupal Varma	
2003	Kalyana Ramudu		
2004	Arjun	Police Commissioner	
2004	Andhrawala	Chitra's father	
2004	Naani	Priya's father	
2004	Adavi Ramudu	Peddayana	
2004	Sye	Owner Of The College	
2005	Bhageeratha	Durga Prasad	
2005	Narasimhudu		
2005	Guru		
2005	10-The Strangers	Psychiatrist	
2005	Athadu	Satya Narayana Murthy	
2005	Nayakudu	Razzaq	
2005	Gowtam SSC	Shambu Prasad I.A.S	
2005	Naa Alludu		
2005	Amrutha Varsham		
2006	Sri Ramadasu	Tana Shah	
2006	Pokiri	Suryanarayana	
2006	Boss	Viswanath	
2007	Brahma - The Creator		
2007	Okkadunnadu	Jayadev	
2007	Gnapakam	DGP Aravinda Rao	
2007	Athidhi	Home Minister	
2007	Don	Commissioner	
2007	Mee Sreyobhilashi		
2008	Pourudu	Bhai	
2008	Krishnarjuna		
2008	Ready	Raghupati	
2008	Nenu Meeku Telusa?	Adithya's uncle	
2008	Ninna Nedu Repu	Dharmanna	
2009	Konchem Ishtam Konchem Kashtam	Subramaniam	
2009	Raju Maharaju		
2009	Snehituda...		
2009	Anjaneyulu	Krishnamurthy	
2010	Adhurs	Major	
2010	Dammunnodu	SP Arvind Kumar	
2010	Taj Mahal		
2010	Varudu	Commissioner Ahmed Khan	
2010	Rama Rama Krishna Krishna	Chakrapani	
2010	Golimaar	DIG Bharat Nanda	
2010	Panchakshari	Vijayshankar Verma	
2010	Komaram Puli	ACP Ravi Kumar	
2011	Prema Kavali		
2011	Shakti	Sage	
2011	Mr. Perfect	Vicky's father	
2011	Veera	Veera's father	
2011	Dookudu	Murthy	
2011	Rajanna	Master Kulkarni	
2011	Aakasame Haddu		
2011	Wanted	Raghunath	
2011	Priyudu	Karthik's father	
2012	Businessman	Ajay Bhardwaj	
2012	Naa Ishtam	Naidu	
2012	Nanda Nanditha	Thug	
2012	Racha	Raghupathi	
2012	Dammu	Chandravanshi King	
2012	Cameraman Gangatho Rambabu	Chandrasekhara Reddy	
2012	Damarukam		
2013	Sevakudu	Ramachandrayya	
2013	Baadshah	Jaya Krishna Simha	
2013	Gouravam	Soundarapandya	
2013	Shadow	Baba	
2013	Iddarammayilatho	Sanjay's father	
2013	Balupu	Shruti's father	
2013	Moksha	Moksha's father	
2013	Dalam	JK	
2013	D-Day	Chief of RAW Ashwini Rao	
2014	1: Nenokkadine	Businessman	
2014	Rabhasa	Ramachandrayya	
2014	Aagadu	Dakshina Murthy	
2014	Mukunda	DSP Mohan Krishna	
2014	Chinnadana Nee Kosam	Reddy Garu	
2014	Anta Scene Ledu	Ajith Kumar	
2014	Erra Bus		
2015	Malli Malli Idi Rani Roju	Nazira's father	
2015	Yevade Subramanyam	Pasupathi	
2015	Janda Pai Kapiraju	Harish Chandra	
2015	Aa Okkadu		
2015	Baahubali: The Beginning	Bijjaladeva	
2015	Courier Boy Kalyan	Sathya Murthy	
2015	Kaki: Sound of Warning	Deepthi's father	
2016	Soggade Chinni Nayana	Rudraraju	
2016	Dictator	Lakshmi Narayana	
2016	Terror	Vijay's father	
2016	Malupu	Chandrasekhar	
2016	Brahmotsavam	Babu's Relative	
2016	Right Right		
2016	Manamantha	Raghavendra Rao Sharma	
2016	Dhruva		
2016	Manalo Okkadu		
2016	Garam	Sameera's father	
2017	Khaidi No. 150	Lions Club Speaker	
2017	The Ghazi Attack	Vice Admiral K. T. Raman (Indian Navy)	
2017	Katamarayudu	Bhupathi	
2017	Guru	Punch Ponds	
2017	Mister	Pichchaiah Naidu	
2017	Baahubali: The Conclusion	Bijjaladeva	
2017	LIE	Vishwanadham	
2017	Jai Lava Kusa	Dhanunjay Sashtri	
2017	PSV Garuda Vega	NIA Head	
2017	Mahanubhavudu	Ramaraju	
2018	Inttelligent	Nandha Kishore	
2018	Vijetha	K. V. Raghunathan	
2018	Nannu Dochukunduvate	Karthik's father	
2018	Sharabha	Tatikonda Chinnarao	
2019	Yatra	Teacher Venkatappa	
2019	N.T.R: Kathanayakudu	Bhavanam Venkatram Reddy	
2019	F2: Fun and Frustration	Viswanath	
2019	118	Dr. Athmaram Divakar	
2019	Maharshi	Chief Minister	
2019	Voter	Krishnamoorthy	
2019	Kalki	Sambasivudu	
2019	Sye Raa Narasimha Reddy	Jayaramireddy	
2019	Chanakya	Kulkarni	
2019	Venky Mama	Ramanarayana	
2019	Software Sudheer	Rajanna	
2019	Iddari Lokam Okate	Ranga Rao	
2020	College Kumar	Santhosh Kumar	
2021	Red	Judge Krishnamurthy	
2021	Kapatadhaari	Ranjith Kumar	
2021	Ninnila Ninnila	Amara's father	
2021	Mugguru Monagallu		
2021	Tuck Jagadish	Aadisesh Naidu	
2022	1945	Subbayya	
2022	Clap	Venkatram	
2022	Acharya	Adanna	
2022	10th Class Diaries	Chandini's father	
2022	Oke Oka Jeevitham	Rangikutta Paul	
2022	Balamevvadu	Dr. James	
2022	Kudhiram Bose	Bal Gangadhar Tilak	
2023	Waltair Veerayya	Constable Koteswara Rao	
2023	Ramabanam	Paparao	
2023	Gandeevadhari Arjuna	Adityaraj Bahadur	
2023	Miss Shetty Mr Polishetty	DK	
2023	Narakasura		
2023	Spark Life	Major Bharadwaj	
2024	Mr. Celebrity	Ramachandrayya	
2024	Naa Saami Ranga	Peddayya	
2025	Kuberaa	Orphanage caretaker	
2025	Hari Hara Veera Mallu	Vissanna	
2025	Baahubali: The Epic	Bijjaladeva	
2026	Euphoria	Surya Narayana Murthy	
2026	S Saraswathi		
2026	Aadarsha Kutumbam House No: 47 - AK47	Judge Pradeep Sarkar	
2026	Aakasamlo Oka Tara	Space Expo Teacher	

==== Malayalam ====
Year	Title	Role	Notes
1990	Mukham	Narendran	
1991	Dhanam	Stephen	
1993	Gazal	Valiyamaliyekkal Syed Burhanudeen Thangal	
1993	Butterflies	Colonel Devan Nambiar	
1997	Guru	The culprit	Cameo
1997	Kulam	Thampy	
1998	Rakthasakshikal Sindabad	Diwan Sir C. P. Ramaswami Iyer	
1999	Olympian Anthony Adam	Roy Mamman / Lawrence Luther	
2000	Sathyam Sivam Sundaram	Indraraja Reddy	
2004	Agninakshathram	Muslim Saint	
2005	Made in USA	Doctor Maddy	
2005	Udayon	Unni Vaidyan	
2008	Pachamarathanalil	C.I. Venkatachala Iyer	
2012	Ideal Couple		
2012	Kochi		
2013	Dracula 2012	Suryamoorthy	
2013	Geethanjali	Kathalikaattu Thirumeni	
2015	Charlie	Street Magician	Cameo
2016	Kattumakkan		
2016	Aadupuliyattam		
2016	Happy Birthday		
2016	Shyam		
2017	Aby		
2018	Aabhaasam	Police Officer	
2018	My Story	Keshava Perumal	Cameo
2018	Neerali	George	Cameo
2021	Erida	Shanker Ganesan	
2022	Pathonpatham Noottandu	Kalliseril Perumal Chekavar	
2023	Laika		
2023	Ramachandra Boss & Co	Ram	

==== Hindi ====
Year	Title	Role	Notes
1995	Angrakshak	Deva	
1995	Criminal	Inspector Teja	
1997	Chachi 420	Siraj / Pandit Shivraj Sharma Kaveri	
1999	Dubashi	Tanjore Maharaja	
2000	Hey Ram	Police Officer	
2001	Little John	Inspector Vijay	
2004	Phir Milenge	Lawyer	
2004	Hulchul	Baapji	
2007	Nishabd	Shridhar	
2008	Firaaq	Grave Digger	
2012	Rowdy Rathore	Baapji	
2013	Jayantabhai Ki Luv Story	Alex Pandian	
2013	D-Day	Ashwini Rao	
2013	David	Father Noel	
2013	Ramaiya Vastavaiya	Jayprakash	
2016	Saala Khadoos	Punch Pandian	
2016	Tutak Tutak Tutiya	spirit priest	
2017	The Ghazi Attack	Vice Admiral Indian Navy (K. T. Raman)	
2019	Article 15	CBI Officer Panikar	
2019	Marjaavaan	Anna	
2020	Serious Men	Dr. Arvind Acharya	Netflix original
2021	Thalaivii	M. Karunanidhi	
2022	Dobaaraa	Dr. Sethupathi	
2022	Ram Setu	Indrakant	
2025	Be Happy	Nadar	
2025	Tanvi the Great	Brigadier KN Rao	
2026	Satluj	DGP SP Varma	
2026	Prahaar: The Untold Story of Ujjwal Nikam	P. Chidambaram	

==== Kannada ====
Year	Title	Role	Notes
1985	Veera Bhadra		
1987	Ravana Rajya		
1999	Underworld		
2002	Dhumm	Shankar	
2005	News	Devaraj	
2006	Cyanide	DIG Karthikeyan	
2006	Mohini 9886788888	Goolappa	
2006	Ajay	DCP Kumaraswamy IPS	
2008	Bindaas	ACP Vikram Rathod	
2010	Suryakaanti	Malanna Bahdur	
2010	Tamassu	Nassar Baba	
2011	Olave Mandara	Srikanth's father	
2013	Bachchan	Dr. Srinivasa Iyengar	
2014	Brahma	Veer Bramha	
2016	Kotigobba 2	Commissioner Sharathkumar	
2017	Bannada Neralu		
2018	Victory 2	Dawoor Hussain	

==== English ====
Year	Title	Role	Notes
2000	Tales of The Kama Sutra: The Perfumed Garden	Prashant	
2001	Little John	Inspector Vijay	
2004	Nothing But Life	Rachel's father	
2004	Morning Raga	Abhinay's father	
2009	Quick Gun Murugan	Rice Plate Reddy	
2010	Fair Game	Mr. Tabir	
2013	Kamasutra 3D	Kama Devi's father-in-law	

==== Bengali ====
Year	Film	Role	Notes
2019	Sitara	Kabir Mahajaan	Debut Bengali Film

=== Television ===
Year	Title	Role	Network	Language	Notes
1997	Chinna Chinna Aasai		Sun TV	Tamil	Appeared in story "Pooja"
2000	Boom Boom Shakalaka		Sun TV	Tamil	Appearance in title song
2021	Jothi	Narasimhan	Sun TV	Tamil	photograph appearance
2022	Victim	Mottai Maadi Siddhar	SonyLIV	Tamil	
2022	Vadhandhi: The Fable of Velonie	KI Sebastian	Amazon Prime Video	Tamil	
2023	The Jengaburu Curse	Ravichandran Rao	SonyLIV	Hindi	
2024	Killer Soup	Inspector Hassan	Netflix	Hindi; Tamil	
2025	Mayasabha	Shivaji Rao	SonyLIV	Telugu	
2025	Arabia Kadali	Susheel Sivaraman	Amazon Prime Video	Telugu	

== As director ==
Year	Title	Ref.
1995	Avatharam	
1997	Devathai	
2001	Maayan	
2003	Pop Corn	
2012	Sun Sun Thatha	

== As dubbing artist ==
Films

Year	Title	Actor	Character	Notes
1987	Manathil Urudhi Vendum	Chandrakanth		
1989	Idhuthanda Police	Rami Reddy		Tamil dubbed version
1990	Vyjayanthi IPS	A. Pundarikakshaiah		Tamil dubbed version
1990	Ulagam Pirandhadhu Enakkaga	Rami Reddy		
1991	Shanti Enathu Shanti	Chakravarthy		
1993	Captain Magal	Napoleon		
1995	The King	Murali		Tamil dubbed version
1996	Indian	Nedumudi Venu		
1996	Devaraagam	Narendra Prasad		Tamil dubbed version
1998	Uyire	Sabyasachi Chakrabarty		Tamil dubbed version
2001	Aalavandhan	Milind Gunaji		
2003	Magic Magic 3D	Al Dioro		
2007	Guru	Mithun Chakraborty		Tamil dubbed version
2008	Vaazhthugal	Na. Muthusamy		
2010	Chutti Chathan	Dalip Tahil		Dubbed for 2010 re-released version
2012	Prince of Persia	Ben Kingsley		Tamil dubbed version
2016	The BFG	Mark Rylance		Tamil dubbed version
2017	Vikram Vedha			Narrator for title credits
2017	Theeran Adhigaaram Ondru			Ending Voiceover
2024	Indian 2	Nedumudi Venu		
2024	Mufasa: The Lion King		Kiros	Tamil dubbed version

Television

Year	Title	Actor	Character	Notes
2021	Squid Game	O Yeong-su		Tamil dubbed version
2023	Farzi	Amol Palekar		Tamil dubbed version

== As playback singer ==
Year	Song	Title	Co-singers	Composer
1998	"Kaalathuketha Oru Gana"	Velai	Vijay, Premgi Amaren	Yuvan Shankar Raja
2010	"Meghame"	Madrasapattinam	Vikram, M. S. Viswanathan	G. V. Prakash Kumar
2018	"Andhaadhi"	96	Govind, Chinmayi	Govind Vasantha

== Accolades ==
Tamil Nadu State Film Awards

- 1992 – Tamil Nadu State Film Award Special Prize – Aavarampoo
- 2002 – Tamil Nadu State Film Award for Best Villain – Thamizh
- 2006 – Tamil Nadu State Film Award for Best Character Artiste (Male) – Em Magan
- 2011 – Tamil Nadu State Film Award for Best Character Artiste (Male) – Deiva Thirumagal
- 2014 – Tamil Nadu State Film Award for Best Character Artiste (Male) – Kaaviya Thalaivan

Ananda Vikatan Cinema Awards

- 2008 – Ananda Vikatan Cinema Award for Best comedian – Poi Solla Porom

Norway Tamil Film Festival Awards

- 2014 – Norway Tamil Film Festival Award for Best Supporting Actor – Kaaviya Thalaivan

Nandi Awards

- Nandi Award for Best Villain - Chanti
