= Muthal Mariyathai =

1985 film by Bharathiraja

- Theatrical release poster
- Directed by: Bharathiraja
- Screenplay by: Bharathiraja
- Story by: R. Selvaraj
- Produced by: Bharathiraja
- Starring: Sivaji Ganesan; Radha
- Cinematography: B. Kannan
- Edited by: V. Rajagopal; P. Mohan Raj
- Music by: Ilaiyaraaja
- Production company: Manoj Creations
- Release date: 15 August 1985
- Running time: 160–161 minutes (Note: While the film's runtime is listed in Encyclopaedia of Indian Cinema as 161 minutes, the version screened at Indian Panorama was 160 minutes.)
- Country: India
- Language: Tamil

Muthal Mariyathai (/mʊðəl mərɪjɑːðaɪ/ transl. Prime/First Honour) is a 1985 Indian Tamil-language romantic drama film produced, directed and co-written by Bharathiraja. The film stars Sivaji Ganesan and Radha, with Vadivukkarasi, newcomers Deepan and Ranjini, Janagaraj, Sathyaraj, Aruna, Veerasamy and Ramanathan in supporting roles. It revolves around the relationship between an unhappily married village chief and a young boatwoman.

The story of Muthal Mariyathai was developed from two sources: an English-language film about the relationship between a young girl and an ageing painter, and a story in Jayakanthan's novel Samoogam Enbadhu Naalu Paer about the relationship between a teacher and an administrator with a strained marriage. The film was co-written by R. Selvaraj, photographed by B. Kannan, and edited by V. Rajagopal and P. Mohan Raj. Filming was entirely held at Talakadu, a village near Mysore in Karnataka.

Muthal Mariyathai was released on 15 August 1985. The film received positive reviews and ran for over 200 days in theatres, becoming a silver jubilee hit. It won the Best Lyricist Award and Best Feature Film in Tamil Award for Vairamuthu and Bharathiraja, respectively, in the 33rd National Film Awards, the Cinema Express Award for Best Film – Tamil, and Ganesan and Radha won Filmfare Awards South in the Best Tamil Actor and Best Tamil Actress categories, respectively.

== Plot ==
The film opens with the friends and family of an ailing village chief, Malaichami, gathered around his deathbed. The plot then moves along in a series of flashbacks.

Malaichami is unhappily married to his cousin Ponnatha, a shrew who always treats him with contempt. Though they live together, they do not share a husband-wife relationship. Also living with them is Ponnatha's daughter Rasamma, her husband and Malaichami's orphaned nephew Chellakannu, who assists him at his farm.

Years roll by. Malaichami, the village chief, is respected by one and all. Kuyil, a young woman, comes to the village with her father looking for work. They build a hut on the river bank and Kuyil works as a boatwoman with a coracle. Malaichami and Kuyil become good friends despite the wide gap in their age and socioeconomic status. Since Malaichami receives no emotional support or love at home, he enjoys Kuyil's company.

Chellakannu loves Sevuli, the daughter of the cobbler Sengodan, and they plan to elope when Sevuli's wedding arrangements are being made. On learning this, Malaichami berates Chellakannu. Kuyil intervenes and convinces Malaichami to let them marry. After the marriage, when Chellakannu and Sevuli are alone in a field, an unseen man kills Sevuli, who managed to bite off his big toe, and steals her jewellery. After Sengodan tells Malaichami he found a toe in Sevuli's mouth, Malaichami sees Rasamma's husband without a toe, realises he is the killer and hands him over to the police. Chellakannu later commits suicide.

When the villagers whisper about the relationship between Malaichami and Kuyil, Ponnatha takes Malaichami to the panchayat, asking for a solution. Malaichami, angered at being questioned by everyone, blurts out that he is indeed in a relationship with Kuyil, just to stop the gossip. He goes to Kuyil to ask for her pardon for having said so in public. However, Kuyil reveals that she indeed is in love with him and that he too must be loving her within himself but is hiding the truth. Though Malaichami denies it at the moment and leaves her asking her to change her mind, he is deeply disturbed at what really could be between them.

At home, Ponnatha angrily tells Malaichami he sent Rasamma's husband to prison because he is not Rasamma's biological father, a fact Rasamma never knew before. Malaichami hits back at her and as he recollects the past, reveals to Rasamma that Ponnatha conceived Rasamma out of wedlock with someone at a village fair and that he married Ponnatha only to save her father from disgrace.

Angered further, Ponnatha invites all her relatives to her house for a settlement of the issue. She throws a feast for them where she requests they kill Kuyil and promises that she will take care of the consequences by spending money for their case. As Malaichami hears this, he challenges the relatives to face him before they can harm her and goes to stay with Kuyil to defend her and to stay with her thereafter.

As Malaichami goes to Kuyil, he finds her home empty and later finds her stained with blood and convicted for the murder of an unknown man. He pleads with her to tell the truth of what transpired so that she can be rescued. She reveals, after making Malaichami promise that he would not proceed to argue on her behalf as it would negate the purpose of her sacrifice, that the person she killed was Mayilvaganam, Rasamma's biological father.

Mayilvaganam was on his way to the village after serving a prison term and was planning to lay claim to Ponnatha and her wealth. As this would affect the reputation of Malaichami's family, she killed Mayilvaganam on her coracle. Malaichami is spellbound by her sacrifice and vows that he will not die till Kuyil returns and chooses to stay in her hut.

In the present, as Malaichami is dying, Kuyil is brought on parole to see him. Malaichami dies after meeting her. While returning to prison on a train, Kuyil also dies.

== Cast ==
- Sivaji Ganesan as Malaichami
- Radha as Kuyil (voiced by Radikaa Sarathkumar)
- Vadivukkarasi as Ponnatha
- Deepan as Chellakannu
- Ranjini as Sevuli
- Janagaraj as the rope-spinner
- Sathyaraj as Mayilvaganam
- Aruna as Rasamma
- Veerasamy as Sengodan
- Ramanathan as Rasamma's husband
- Ilavarasu as the photographer
- Kullamani as a villager

== Production ==
=== Development ===
The story of Muthal Mariyathai was developed by Bharathiraja from two sources: an English-language film about "an old painter and a young girl who is attracted to his paintings. Gradually, she becomes attracted to the person as well", and a story in Jayakanthan's novel Samoogam Enbadhu Naalu Paer about "the relationship that develops between a young teacher who comes to a place and a local administrator who is in a bad marriage. She becomes his intellectual companion". After Bharathiraja outlined this to writer R. Selvaraj, they both developed the screenplay of Muthal Mariyathai. According to Selvaraj, the romance between the characters Malaichami and Kuyil was inspired by the manner in which the Russian novelist Fyodor Dostoevsky developed a relationship with his assistant Anna. Bharathiraja himself produced the film under Manoj Creations, while cinematography was handled by B. Kannan and editing by V. Rajagopal and P. Mohan Raj.

=== Casting ===
Bharathiraja and Selvaraj initially wanted Rajesh for the role of Malaichami, but distributors objected. Selvaraj later considered S. P. Balasubrahmanyam but realised it would not be possible due to Balasubrahmanyam's playback singing commitments, so Bharathiraja suggested Sivaji Ganesan. Though unwell at the time, Ganesan accepted Bharathiraja's request. According to Radhika, she had been offered the role of Kuyil, but she declined in favour of Swathi Muthyam. Bharathiraja, however, countered that Radhika would not have been appropriate as Kuyil. He cast Radha in the role because she was "dusky, slender, and tall", just like he envisioned the character, and Radhika was not. Despite this, Radha's voice was dubbed by Radhika. Muthal Mariyathai was Radha's 99th film as an actress; she stated that when Bharathiraja offered her the role of Kuyil, she "took it with both hands".

Bharathiraja cast Vadivukkarasi as Malaichami's wife Ponnatha because of her "large eyes". Since the actress, who was then in her early 20s, was not as old as the character she plays, the makers "smeared ash" on her face. According to Vadivukkarasi, "They glued tubes to my ears to make them look different. But I didn't mind and didn't really know." This was the feature film debut of Sasha Selvaraj, who was given the stage name Ranjini, and played Sevuli, the daughter of Sengodan (Veerasamy). Ranjini, who was then studying in Singapore, arrived in Madras to take a break from education, and hoped that filming would conclude within two weeks. It was also the debut of Deepan, who played Malaichami's nephew Chellakannu. Deepan, the nephew of V. N. Janaki, initially abstained from films to concentrate on his family business, but when Bharathiraja saw him and asked Deepan's uncle and Janaki's then-husband M. G. Ramachandran for permission to cast him, both agreed.

=== Filming ===
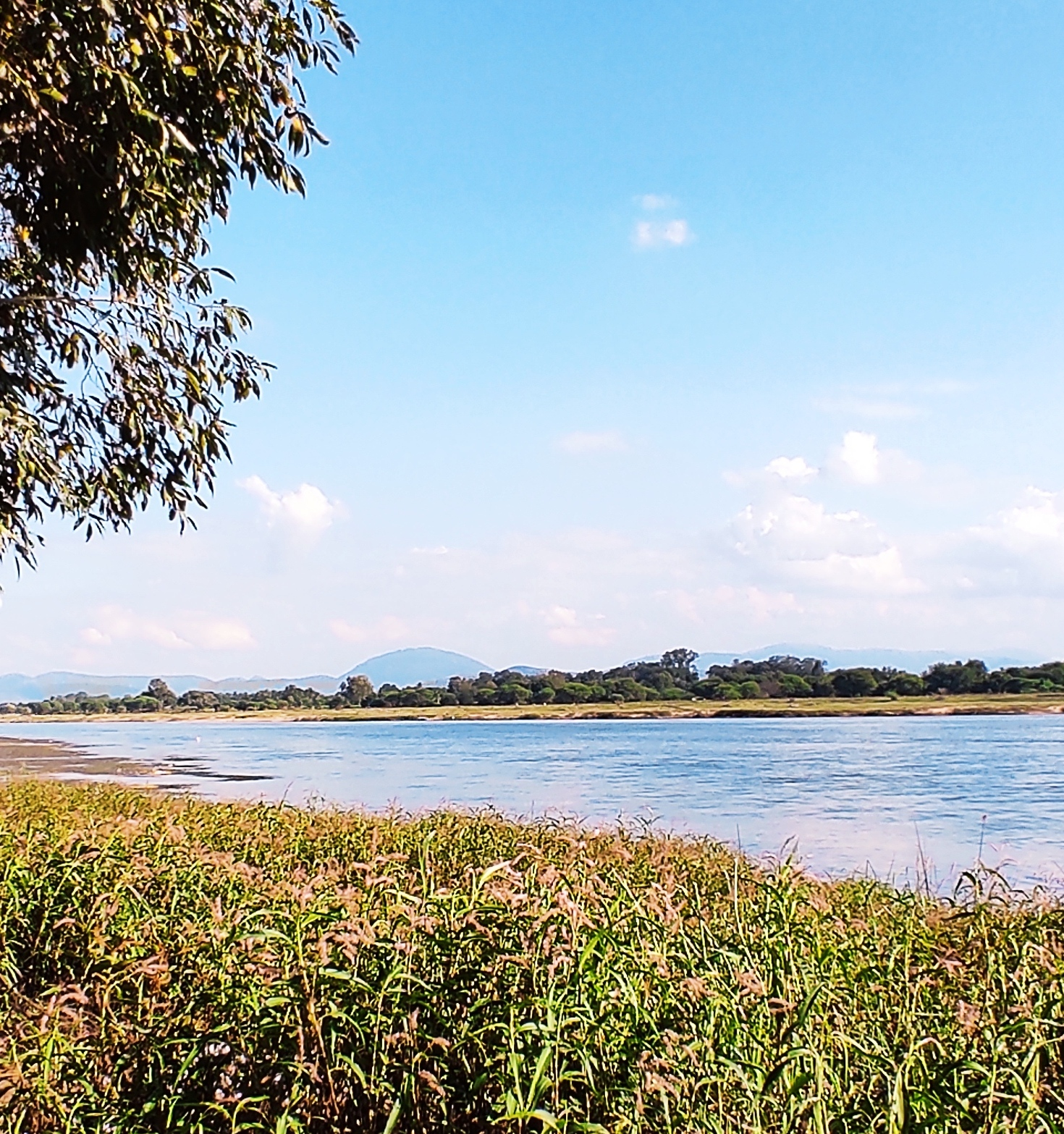
The Kaveri river passing through Talakadu, where the film was shot.

The film was launched at Prasad Studios. Filming was entirely held at Talakadu, a village near Mysore in Karnataka. Though Ganesan was known mainly for his melodramatic performances and powerful dialogue delivery, Bharathiraja asked him to tone them down for playing Malaichami and "just be himself". On the sets, Ganesan insisted on seeing what Bharathiraja wanted first before performing a scene. At Bharathiraja's request, Ganesan acted without a wig or makeup, and wore only a dhoti and shirt while filming his scenes. According to Ranjini, Ganesan never coached the other actors, "but always let them try out their roles themselves". Many scenes were filmed at a tree near the Shivanasamudra Falls on the banks of the Kaveri river.

While filming a scene where Ponnatha walks angrily across a street and strikes Kuyil with a broom, Vadivukkarasi fainted due to exertion from long-distance walking. A chapter from Ki. Rajanarayanan's novel Gopalla Grammam was used by Bharathiraja in the film with permission from the author. Filming did not conclude within two weeks as Ranjini hoped; she attributed it to "Bharathiraja being a perfectionist". According to historian G. Dhananjayan, filming lasted roughly 50 days, while Ganesan claimed that it lasted a month and Selvaraj said the complete film was ready 100 days after filming began. A documentary homage to Ganesan was attached to the final cut, playing before the actual film begins. The final cut of the film was 4,415 metres (14,485 ft).

== Themes ==
Muthal Mariyathai deals with "social tensions arising out of caste and community in Tamil society". Bharathiraja described the film as "the voyage of a man from house to home". Writing for The News Minute, Nandhu Sundaram said that in the film, "society is a throbbing entity that is alive in every sense of the word, and sometimes it is malignant as well. Keeping one's hard-earned dignity can get increasingly difficult". Writing for The Times of India, Deepauk Murugesan notes that Bharathiraja used the relationships in the film "as a commentary on caste and its subliminal presence in our interactions".

== Soundtrack ==
The music was composed by Ilaiyaraaja while the lyrics for the songs were written by Vairamuthu. Neither liked the film after viewing its rough cut because they felt it "wasn't youthful", but Bharathiraja insisted that Ilaiyaraaja compose the score. According to Ilaiyaraaja, when Bharathiraja saw the finished cut after composing was complete, he asked Ilaiyaraaja how he was able to deliver such wonderful music even for a film he did not like, and Ilaiyaraaja replied it was because he could not do injustice to his profession. Many of the songs were inspired by Indian folk music. The song "Antha Nilava Thaan" is set in the Carnatic raga Natabhairavi, and "Poongatru Thirumbuma" is set in Kharaharapriya. The tune of "Antha Nilava Thaan" was later used by Ilaiyaraaja in "Mujhe Bahon Mein Bhar" from the 1989 Hindi film Mahaadev.

All lyrics are written by Vairamuthu; all music is composed by Ilaiyaraaja.

Track listing
No.	Title	Singer(s)	Length
1.	"Antha Nilava Thaan"	Ilaiyaraaja, K. S. Chithra	4:31
2.	"Poongatru Thirumbuma"	Ilaiyaraaja, Malaysia Vasudevan, S. Janaki	4:52
3.	"Vetti Veru Vasam"	Malaysia Vasudevan, S. Janaki	4:28
4.	"Yeh Kuruvi"	Malaysia Vasudevan, S. Janaki	1:16
5.	"Raasave Unna Nambi"	S. Janaki	4:32
6.	"Hey Kiliyirukku"	Ilaiyaraaja	1:08
7.	"Eratha Malai Mele"	Malaysia Vasudevan, S. Janaki	2:08
8.	"Naanthaaney Antha Kuyil"	S. Janaki	0:28
9.	"Poongatru Thirumbuma"	Malaysia Vasudevan, S. Janaki	0:28
Total length:			22:54

== Release and reception ==
Muthal Mariyathai was released on 15 August 1985. The film received positive reviews for its realistic portrayal of an elderly person's love and sacrifices. Ananda Vikatan said that when detractors were talking about the end of Ganesan's era in Tamil cinema, Bharathiraja proved through an intense script and character that his saga was not over yet. The reviewer also applauded Radha's performance and Bharathiraja's direction. Kalki lauded the film for its cinematography and Bharathiraja's direction. Balumani of Anna praised the acting, dialogues, cinematography, music and direction. Though Vadivukkarasi received acclaim from critics for her performance, she was the subject of vitriol from fans of Ganesan due to her character's antagonistic nature. The film ran for over 200 days in theatres, becoming a silver jubilee hit.

== Accolades ==
At the 33rd National Film Awards, Radha was a strong contender for the Best Actress category, but was disqualified since her voice was dubbed by a different actress. The film was screened at the Indian Panorama section of the 1985 International Film Festival of India.

Award	Category	Nominee(s)	Ref.
National Film Awards	Best Feature Film in Tamil	Bharathiraja	
National Film Awards	Best Lyrics	Vairamuthu	
Cinema Express Awards	Best Film – Tamil	Bharathiraja	
Filmfare Awards South	Best Actor – Tamil	Sivaji Ganesan	
Filmfare Awards South	Best Actress – Tamil	Radha	

== Legacy ==
Muthal Mariyathai became a landmark film for Ganesan, Bharathiraja and Vadivukkarasi. The film's opening phrase narrated by Bharathiraja, "En Iniya Thamizh Makkale" (My sweet Tamil people) featured in many of his later films. The dialogue "Enaku oru unma therinjaaganum" (I need to know the truth) spoken by Veerasami's character became popular. The unrelated TV series Muthal Mariyathai, also directed by Bharathiraja, aired on Kalaignar TV. Bharathiraja described his 2020 directorial venture Meendum Oru Mariyathai as a tribute to Muthal Mariyathai. Muthal Mariyathai is included alongside other Ganesan-starring films in the compilation DVD 8th Ulaga Adhisayam Sivaji. A digitally restored version of the film was released on 24 March 2023.

== In popular culture ==
In a comedy scene from Thalattu Ketkuthamma, a man (Goundamani) sings "Poongatru Thirumbuma" to impress his wife (Vijay Chandrika), and his nephew Rasaiya (Prabhu) completes the lyrics after the former has forgotten them. In Rajakumaran, a milkman Maarusamy (Goundamani) tries to impress a girl whose face he has not seen by providing milk. The song "Poongatru" with different lyrics is heard as a background song for the scene. In a scene from Unakkaga Ellam Unakkaga, Kundalakesi (Goundamani) lifts a huge stone similar to Malaichami's technique from Muthal Mariyathai to impress his lover. In Mozhi, Ananthakrishnan (Brahmanandam) watches "Poongatru" on television before getting disturbed by a cockroach.

== Bibliography ==
- Arunachalam, Param (2020). BollySwar: 1981–1990. Mavrix Infotech. ISBN 978-81-938482-2-7.
- Dhananjayan, G. (2014). Pride of Tamil Cinema: 1931–2013. Blue Ocean Publishers. OCLC 898765509.
- Ganesan, Sivaji; Narayana Swamy, T. S. (2007) [2002]. Autobiography of an Actor: Sivaji Ganesan, October 1928 – July 2001. Sivaji Prabhu Charities Trust. OCLC 297212002.
- Rajadhyaksha, Ashish; Willemen, Paul (1998) [1994]. Encyclopaedia of Indian Cinema. British Film Institute and Oxford University Press. ISBN 0-19-563579-5.
- Ramaswamy, Vijaya · (2017). Historical Dictionary of the Tamils. Rowman & Littlefield Publishers. ISBN 978-1-5381-0685-3.
- Sundararaman (2007) [2005]. Raga Chintamani: A Guide to Carnatic Ragas Through Tamil Film Music (2nd ed.). Pichhamal Chintamani. OCLC 295034757.
