= Neerthirai =

2019 Indian drama film by P. S. Dharan

- Directed by: P. S. Dharan
- Produced by: Kameela Nassar
- Starring: Nassar; Thalaivasal Vijay; Viji Chandrasekhar
- Cinematography: P. S. Dharan
- Edited by: B Subhashkar
- Music by: Tosh Nanda
- Production company: N Films
- Release date: 22 March 2019
- Running time: 118 mins
- Country: India
- Language: Tamil

Neerthirai (transl. Watershed) is a 2019 Indian Tamil-language comedy film directed by P. S. Dharan and produced by Kameela Nassar. It stars an ensemble cast including Nassar, Thalaivasal Vijay, Viji Chandrasekhar and Rohini in the lead roles. The film began production in late 2018 and had a limited release on 22 March 2019. The film was unsuccessful at the box office.

== Plot ==
A set of college friends unite after three decades for a reunion. Their meeting begins on a cheerful note, but later becomes a serious introspection on their past and present.

== Cast ==
- Nassar as Basheer
- Thalaivasal Vijay as Kannan
- Viji Chandrasekhar as Abhirami
- Babloo Prithiveeraj as Yoganand
- Bala Singh
- Rohini as Banu
- Ashwin Kakumanu

== Production ==
The film was shot in late 2018, and was intended to be an experimental, conversation-driven project. P. S. Dharan, a cinematographer who had often worked with Nassar directed the film. Although Kameela Nassar initially produced the film under the Abi Entertainments banner, she later released the film through the newly launched N Medias studio.

== Release and reception ==
The film had a limited release across Tamil Nadu on 22 March 2019 by distributors SPI Cinemas and AP Film International. The film was shown in a single show on a single day, as the makers sought to give the film a release on a digital platform at a later date. It was also noted for becoming the first Tamil film to discuss the Me Too movement. A critic from Times of India wrote "The conversations seem engaging enough and the actors are all appealing, but somehow, you do not get the feel of watching a cinema. The experience is more akin to watching a theatrical play." A critic from The Hindu compared the film's arty approach to Amshan Kumar's Manusangada (2017) and Chezhiyan's To Let (2019). The reviewer compared the film's plot to the Malayalam film Ozhivudivasathe Kali (2015) and the romantic drama '96 (2018), citing that all three stories featured tales of reunions.
