= Bala Singh =

Indian actor (1952–2019)

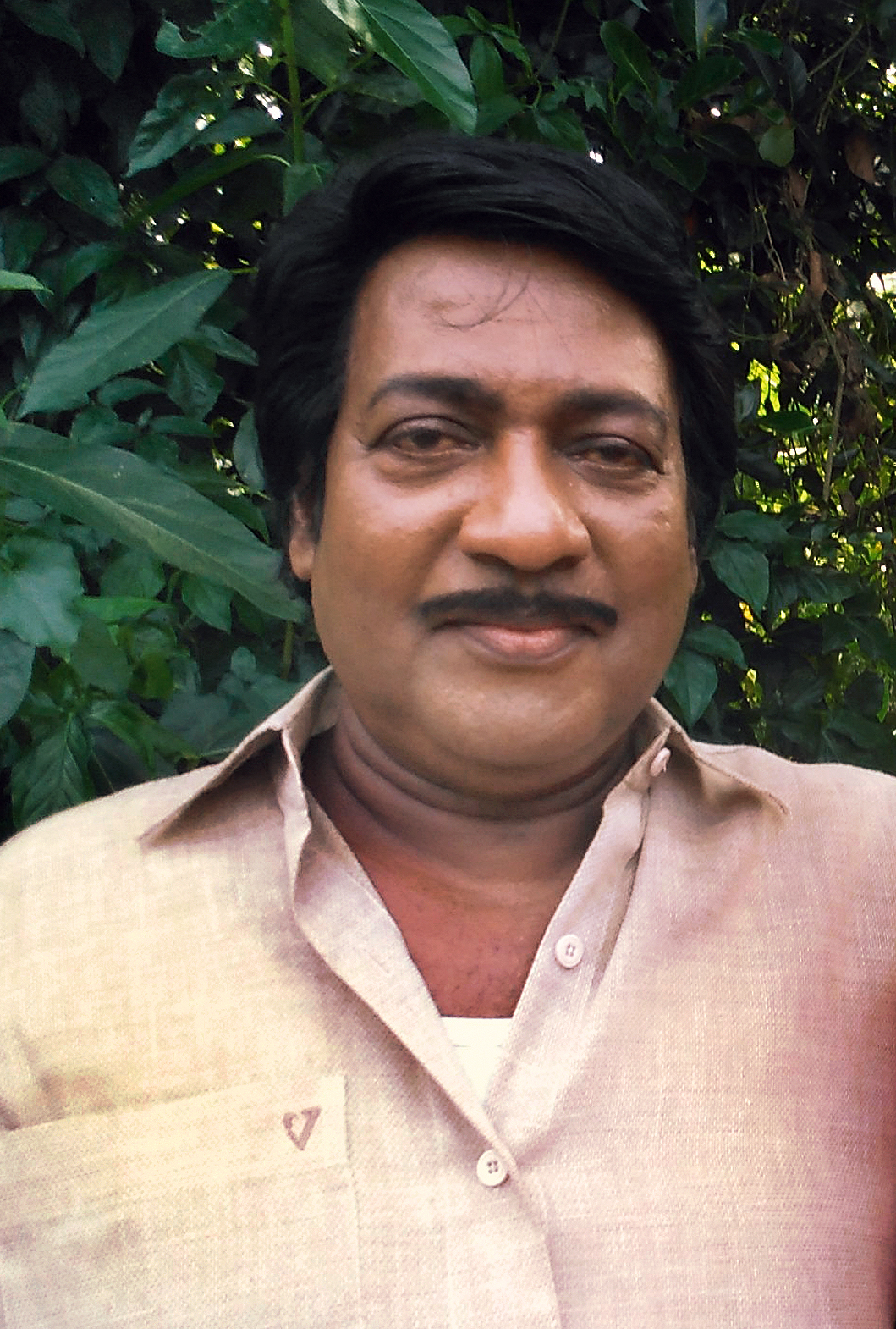
- Born: 7 May 1966; Thaiyalumoodu, Kanyakumari District, Tamil Nadu, India
- Died: 27 November 2019 (aged 53); Chennai, Tamil Nadu, India
- Occupation: Actor
- Years active: 1987–2019
- Awards: Kalaimamani Award (2006)

Bala Singh (7 May 1966 – 27 November 2019) was an Indian actor, who appeared predominantly in Tamil language films. After making his debut in Yugi Sethu's Kavithai Paada Neramillai (1987), he appeared as the antagonist in over a hundred films.

== Early life and career ==
Bala Singh was born in Amsikkakuzhi, near Marthandam in Kanyakumari district.

Bala initially began his career featuring in stage plays and trained with the National School of Drama, before being noticed for his role in Nassar's Avatharam.

He played notable characters in Indian (1996), Ullaasam (1997), Simmarasi (1998), Dheena (2001), Kannathil Muthamittal (2002), Saamy (2003), Virumaandi (2004), Pudhupettai (2006), Vannathupoochi (2009) and NGK (2019).

Throughout his career, Bala predominantly did Tamil films and only occasionally starred in Malayalam films. His popular Malayalam films include Malamukalile Daivam (1983), Kerala House Udan Vilpanakku (2004) and Mulla (2008).

== Death ==
On 27 November 2019, he died at Chennai due to cardiac arrest.

== Awards ==
- 2006: Received title of Kalaimamani Award by the Government of Tamil Nadu, which is the highest state honour in the field of Arts.

== Filmography ==
=== Tamil films ===
Year	Title	Role	Notes
1987	Kavithai Paada Neramillai	Advocate	
1995	Avatharam	Baasi	
1996	Indian	Treasury department officer	
1997	Raasi	Kathirvel	
1997	Ullaasam	Dhamodharan	
1997	Raman Abdullah	Dharmalingam	
1997	Porkkaalam		
1998	Maru Malarchi	Kalingarayan	
1998	Dhinamdhorum	Government officer	
1998	Ellame En Pondattithaan	Politician	
1998	Simmarasi		
1998	Pudhumai Pithan		
1999	Guest House		
1999	Iraniyan		
1999	Anantha Poongatre	Viswam	
1999	Kaama	Venkatagiri	
2000	Sandhitha Velai		
2000	Sudhandhiram		
2000	Bharathi		
2001	Nila Kaalam	Garage owner	Television film
2001	Dheena	MLA Malarvannan	
2001	Maayan		
2002	Dhaya	Minister	
2002	Kannathil Muthamittal	Devanathan	
2002	Kamarasu		
2002	Ivan	Politician	
2002	Sundhara Travels	Politician	
2002	Nanba Nanba	Edwards	
2003	Saamy	MLA Aatangkarai Shanmugam	
2003	Oruththi		
2003	Nala Damayanthi	Chettiyar	
2004	Virumaandi	Rasukkaalai	
2004	Udhaya	Vanji	
2004	Jore		
2004	Madhurey	Gopal	
2004	Dreams		
2005	Mannin Maindhan	Joseph	
2005	Kannamma		
2006	Thirupathi		
2006	Pudhupettai	Anbu	
2006	Naalai	Kothandam	
2006	Thalaimagan		
2006	Ilakkanam	Kayalvizhi's father	
2006	Rendu	Rathnasamy	
2007	Muni		
2007	Kireedam	Maasilamani	
2007	Naan Avanillai	Minister	
2008	Pirivom Santhippom	Muthaiya	
2008	Bheemaa	Krishnamoorthy	
2008	Thangam		
2008	Ayyavazhi		
2008	Uliyin Osai	Brammarayar	
2008	Pandhayam		
2009	Ananda Thandavam		
2009	Kandhakottai	MLA	
2009	Malayan	Bakkiyam's father	
2009	Jaganmohini		
2009	Vannathupoochi	Chinnasamy	
2009	Vettaikaaran	Rajasekhar	
2009	Thalai Ezhuthu	Pachai	
2010	Madrasapattinam	Duraisamy	
2010	Virunthali	Rangarajan	
2010	Thambi Arjuna	Kaaka	
2010	Neethana Avan	Vasudevan	
2011	Pasakkara Nanbargal	Arun's grandfather	Uncredited role
2011	Markandeyan	Esakki	
2011	Ilaignan		
2011	Osthe	District Collector	
2011	Keezha Theru Kicha		
2011	Varmam	Swamy	
2011	Minsaram	Sundaramoorthy	
2011	Velayudham		credited as Pudhupettai Anbu
2011	Thambi Vettothi Sundaram	Pakku Paramasivam	
2012	Ambuli	Dubashi	
2012	Idhayam Thiraiarangam		
2012	Krishnaveni Panjaalai		
2012	Maasi		
2012	Porkodi 10am Vaguppu		
2013	Chennaiyil Oru Naal	Councillor	
2013	Jannal Oram	Village President	
2013	Vathikuchi		
2013	Yamuna		
2014	Tenaliraman	Naganadha	
2014	Angusam		
2014	Vingyani		
2014	Jigarthanda	Shanmugham Annachi	
2014	Oru Oorla Rendu Raja	Priya's father	
2014	Vizhi Moodi Yosithaal	Bai	
2015	Nathikal Nanaivathillai		
2015	Kamara Kattu		
2015	49-O	Dheenadhyalan	
2015	Bhooloham	Boxing Club Member	
2016	Summave Aaduvom		
2016	Virumandikkum Sivanandikkum	Sivanandi	
2016	Balle Vellaiyathevaa		
2017	Engitta Modhathey		
2017	Attu		
2017	Kurangu Bommai	Viji's father	
2017	Valla Desam		
2018	Thaanaa Serndha Koottam	Gunasekaran	
2018	Kadikara Manithargal	House owner	
2018	Saamy Square	MLA Aatangkarai Shanmugam	
2019	Sarvam Thaala Mayam	Gokul Raj	
2019	Neerthirai		
2019	Kudimagan		
2019	NGK	Aruna Giri	
2019	Magamuni	Politician	
2021	Aadhangam		
2021	Engada Iruthinga Ivvalavu Naala	Master	
2025	Kannagi Nagar		
2026	Thaai Nilam		

=== Other language films ===
Year	Title	Role	Language	Notes
1983	Malamukalile Daivam	Landlord	Malayalam	
1985	Uyarum Njan Nadake		Malayalam	
1987	Jungle Boy		Malayalam	
1989	Thadavarayile Rajakkanmaar	Ramaswamy	Malayalam	
1990	Urvasi		Malayalam	
1991	Veendum Oru Aadyaraathri	Rajan	Malayalam	
1991	Aadyaraathrikku Mumbu		Malayalam	
2004	Kanninum Kannadikkum	Varadaraja Malan	Malayalam	
2004	Kerala House Udan Vilpanakku	Chinna Thevar	Malayalam	
2005	Maniyarakallan	Nagaraja Mannasiar	Malayalam	
2008	Mulla		Malayalam	
2013	Gundello Godari	Chandri	Telugu	
2019	Kalippu	Beeran	Malayalam	

== Television ==
- Soolam (2002–2004)
- Rudhraveenai (2003–2004)
- Raja Rajeshwari (2004-2007)
- Nalla Neram (2013–2014)
- Aathira (2015–2016)
- Keladi Kanmani (2017)
- Vanathai Pola (2020) (Photo Appearance)
- Kayal (2021) (Photo Appearance)
- Anandha Ragam (2022) (Photo Appearance)
