= Maathangal Ezhu =

- Directed by: Yugi Sethu
- Written by: Yugi Sethu
- Produced by: A. Sundaram
- Starring: Yugi Sethu; Ramya Krishnan; Nassar
- Cinematography: Nithyan
- Edited by: G. Jayachandran
- Music by: Vidyasagar
- Production company: Vivek Chithra Productions
- Release date: 9 July 1993
- Country: India
- Language: Tamil

Maathangal Ezhu (transl. Seven months) is a 1993 Indian Tamil-language drama film directed by Yugi Sethu. He also stars, alongside Ramya Krishnan and Nassar. The film was released on 9 July 1993 and was not commercially successful.

== Plot ==
The film revolves around Raja (played by Yugi Sethu) , an orphan who is a cynical, angry vagabond. Blessed with a divine musical talent, he encounters Savitri (Ramya Krishnan), a talented stage singer who tries to refine and reform him. However, circumstances push Raja back into his old self-destructive ways.

Savitri, frustrated by Raja’s behaviour, marries Raghu (played by Nassar), who is portrayed as a sadist and womaniser.

When Savitri becomes pregnant and is abandoned by Raghu, Raja comes to her aid. He not only supports her but also assists a midwife during her delivery, using a unique method that is hailed as a breakthrough in the medical profession. Initially dismissed as a lost cause, his musical interaction with the baby in the womb draws the interest of a doctor (Charuhasan), who gets excited and repeatedly asks Raja to play his music to verify the results.

In the end, despite emotional humiliation and resentment from Savitri due to the baby's attachment to Raja, he reunites Raghu and Savitri.

== Cast ==
- Yugi Sethu as Raja
- Ramya Krishnan as Savitri
- Nassar as Raghu
- Manorama
- Charuhasan as the doctor

== Production ==
Maathangal Ezhu was the second directorial film of Yugi Sethu after Kavithai Paada Neramillai (1987). It was produced under Vivek Chithra Productions.

== Soundtrack ==
The soundtrack was composed by Vidyasagar, with lyrics by Vaali.

Track listing
| No. | Title | Singer(s) | Length |
|---|---|---|---|
| 1. | "Mani Thooral" | S. P. Balasubrahmanyam | 5:06 |
| 2. | "Annai Madi" | K. J. Yesudas | 5:24 |
| 3. | "Kaadhal Enna" | Mano | 4:17 |
| 4. | "Meetu Ennai" | S. P. Balasubrahmanyam, K. S. Chithra | 5:38 |
| 5. | "Enna Thavam" | Jalapathi Subramaniyam | 2:48 |
| 6. | "Netru Indru Naalai" | S. P. Balasubrahmanyam, K. S. Chithra | 5:07 |
| Total length: | | | 28:20 |

== Release and reception ==
Although Maathangal Ezhu was cleared by the Censor Board in 1991, it was released only on 9 July 1993. Malini Mannath of The Indian Express wrote, "The attempt to make a film that is artistic as well as commercial backfires". R. P. R. of Kalki, however, reviewed the film more positively, comparing it favourably to older Tamil films. The film was not commercially successful.

== Trivia ==
The song 'Meetu Ennai', originally sung by S. P. Balasubrahmanyam and K. S. Chithra, was later remade as 'Aaro Viral Neetti' by Vidyasagar for the 1998 Malayalam film Pranayavarnangal, which was among the works that contributed to Vidyasagar winning the Kerala State Film Award for Best Music Director
