= Mu Ramaswamy =

Indian actor

- Born: Murugaiah Ramasamy; April 12, 1951 (age 75); Madurai, Tamilnadu
- Other names: Ramasamy, M. Ramasamy
- Occupations: Theatre artist Professor of Drama; Actor
- Spouse: Shenbagam

Mu Ramaswamy is an Indian theatre artist, professor of drama, and actor best known for his dramas Durgira Avalam, a Tamil adaptation of Sophocles' Antigone, and Kalagakkarar Thozhar Periyar, a biography of the life of Periyar. He later moved on to playing major roles in Tamil films starting with Joker (2016) and K.D. (2019).

== Career ==
=== Theatrical career ===
Ramaswamy began his career by pursuing a Ph.D. in theatrical drama. He created the theatrical group ‘Nija Nataka Iyakkam' (‘Real Theatre Movement') and staged several plays. His interest in acting has led him to stage several plays in Tamil including Durgira Avalam and Kalagakkarar Thozhar Periyar. Ramaswamy has also translated several dramas into Tamil due to his love for Tamil, which resulted from him growing up during the Dravidian movement. Some of the plays that he has translated includes plays by G. Sankara Pillai and Bertolt Brecht.

=== Film career ===
Nassar noticed his stage talent and offered Ramaswamy supporting roles in his films Devathai and Maayan. After playing supporting roles in several films, Ramaswamy started playing major roles starting with Joker and K.D.

== Plays ==
- Gangayin Mainthan
- Pandithar Moovarum Mandathoru Singamum
- Padukavalan
- Durgira Avalam - Tamil adaptation of Antigone
- Kalagakkarar Thozhar Periyar as Periyar
- Ponniyin Selvan as Periya Pazhuvettaraiyar

== Filmography ==
=== Films ===
- All films are in Tamil, unless otherwise noted.

Key
†	Denotes films that have not yet been released

Year	Film	Role	Notes
1997	Devathai	Seer	credited as Tanjai Ramasamy
2001	Maayan	Maayan's father	
2001	Nandhaa	Villager	credited as Tanjai Ramasamy
2002	Kannathil Muthamittal	Sundaralingam	
2003	Pithamagan	Chithan's caretaker	
2005	Sandakozhi	Villager	
2007	Paruthiveeran	Villager	
2008	Vaazhthugal	Subbaiyah	
2011	Sankarankovil	Bullock cart driver	
2016	Kida Poosari Magudi	Thatha	
2016	Joker	'Potti Case' Ponnoonjal	
2016	Kidaari	Kombaiah's friend	
2018	Sandakozhi 2	Villager	
2019	K.D.	Karuppudurai (K. D.)	
2022	Kombu Vatcha Singamda	Village head	
2022	Vaaitha	Appusamy	
2022	Thiruchitrambalam	Pazham's maternal grandfather	
2022	Cheppalani Undhi		Telugu film
2023	Tamil Kudimagan	Pechimuthu	
2024	Aalan	Thyagu's grandfather	
2025	Maayakoothu	Mentor	

=== Television ===
Year	Name	Role	Channel	Ref(s)
2019	Thari	Ramasamy	Colors Tamil	
