= Parandhu Sella Vaa =

2016 Indian film by Dhanapal Padmanaban

- Poster
- Directed by: Dhanapal Padmanabhan
- Written by: Sathyarajkumar, Payon and Dhanapal Padmanabhan
- Produced by: P. Arumaichandran
- Starring: Luthfudeen; Aishwarya Rajesh; Narelle Kheng
- Cinematography: Santhosh Vijayakumar; Prabhakaran
- Edited by: Rajesh Kumar
- Music by: Joshua Sridhar
- Production company: 8 Point Entertainment
- Distributed by: Kalaipuli International
- Release date: 9 December 2016
- Country: India
- Language: Tamil

Parandhu Sella Vaa (transl. Let's fly) is a 2016 Indian Tamil language romantic comedy film directed by Dhanapal Padmanaban. The film stars Luthfudeen, Aishwarya Rajesh and Narelle Kheng in the leading roles. The film features music composed by Joshua Sridhar. The film's title is based on a song from O Kadhal Kanmani (2015).

== Cast ==
- Luthfudeen as Sampath
- Aishwarya Rajesh as Madhavi
- Narelle Kheng as Min Yuan / Lily Chan
- Sathish as Mani
- Karunakaran as Arun
- RJ Balaji as Markandeyan (Mark)
- Joe Malloori as Douglas
- Anandhi Ajay as Radha
- Sri Nisha
- Ponnambalam as Ponnambalam
- Manobala
- G. Gnanasambandan as Sampath's father
- Sujatha Sivakumar as Sampath's mother
- Thayumanavan Mathi as Madhavi's uncle
- Gunalan Morgan as Raksha
- Udaya Soundari as Sanghavi
- T. M. Karthik as Vivek

== Production ==
In December 2015, Dhanapal Padamanaban revealed that he would be making a romantic comedy film set in Singapore featuring Luthfudeen Baasha, who was earlier seen in Saivam (2014), in the lead role for the first time. Aishwarya Rajesh and Salony Luthra were selected to play the lead actresses, while the team revealed that they were searching for one more heroine. Satish, Karunakaran and RJ Balaji signed on to play supporting characters, while Singaporean actors Guna, Mathi, Udaya soundari and Sukanya were also selected to portray supporting roles in the film. Production started for the film in January 2016 in Singapore. Salony Luthra opted out the film soon after production began, citing that the director had changed the story from the initial narration of the film she had heard. Singaporean actress Narelle Kheng subsequently replaced her in the role. After completing production without a title, it was later named as Parandhu Sella Vaa, taken from the title of a song from Mani Ratnam's O Kadhal Kanmani (2015).

The soundtrack and trailer for the film were revealed in a ceremony held in Singapore during June 2016, where Singaporean MPs Vikram Nair, Ganesh Rajaram and R. Dhinakaran were invited as chief guests.

== Soundtrack ==
Soundtrack was composed by Joshua Sridhar.

- Yaarume Thaniyaai - Haricharan
- Nadhiyil Vizhundha - Shweta Mohan
- Man Meedhu - Rajesh Krishnan
- Kaatril Aeri - Joshua Sridhar, Lady Kash
- Sillendru - Sathyaprakash, MM Manasi
- Rules Maathi - Santhosh Jayakaran, Suvi

== Release ==
The Times of India gave the film two out of five stars and wrote that "Much of it feels like an aimless drifting of one scene after another, with randomly placed songs and stunts". The satellite rights of the film were sold to Colors Tamil
