= Amshan Kumar =

Indian filmmaker and writer

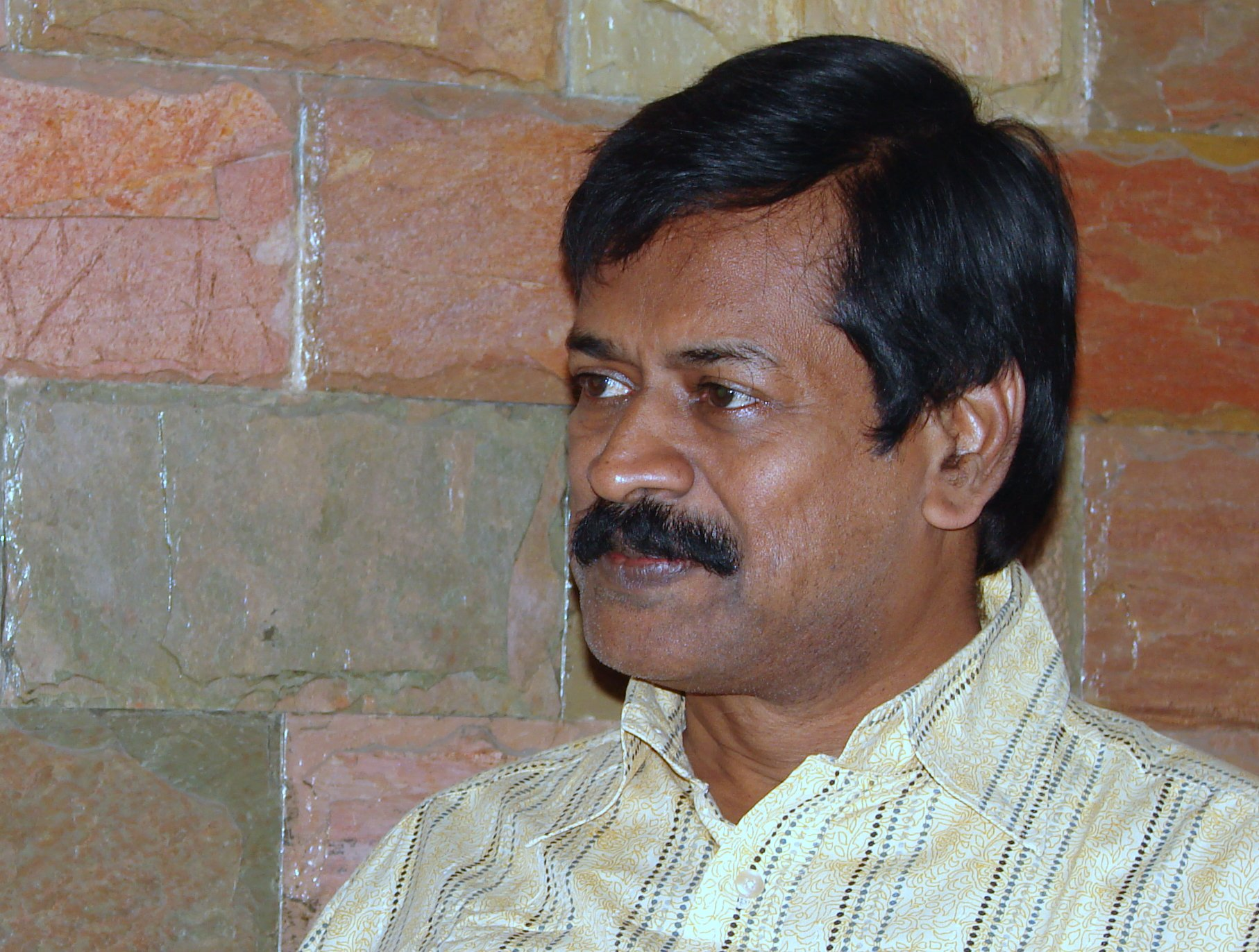
- Born: Tiruchirappalli, Tamil Nadu
- Occupations: Film director and Writer
- Years active: 1995 – present

Amshan Kumar is an Indian filmmaker and writer. He has won a National Film Award for his documentary film Yazhpanan Thedchanamoorthy - Music beyond boundaries in the year 2015. This is a lone Tamil non-fiction film to win a National Award in the past 17 years prior to this award He is also a writer on films, his book Cinema Rasanai on film appreciation is being used as a textbook in many universities. His debut feature film Oruththi was selected for the 2003 International Film Festival of India and was screened in the Indian Panorama section. His second feature film Manusangada was screened in the 39th Cairo International Film Festival and also in the 48th International Film Festival of India (2017) in the Indian Panorama section. He lives in Chennai.

== Career ==
Amshan Kumar has made more than twenty five documentaries including Badal Sircar`s Third Theatre, Modern Art in Tamil Nadu, Mangrove Forests, Nobel Laureate C.V.Raman, U.Ve.Saminatha Iyer, Tamil Poet Subramania Bharati and Manakkal S.Rangarajan. His first directorial feature film in Tamil Oruththi selected for was shown in Indian Panorama based on a short novel by the renowned writer Ki. Rajanarayanan . It won the best film awards from Government of Pondicherry and Tamil Association of New Jersey. His documentary on the Tavil Maestro Yazhpanam Thedchanmoorthy won the national award for the best arts/ cultural film in 2015. It is the first Tamil non-feature film to win a National Award in 17 years.

His second feature film Manusangada was selected in the Indian Panorama section of International Film Festival of India, Goa and was the only Tamil film to be selected that year. The film had its world priemere in Jio MAMI Mumbai Film Festival and its International Premiere at the Cairo International Film Festival.

== Filmography ==
- Oruththi (2003)
- Manusangada (2017)
