= Oruththi =

- Directed by: Amshan Kumar
- Based on: Kidai by Ki. Rajanarayanan
- Starring: Poorvaja; Ganesh Babu; Bharati Mani; Thomas Ober; Ram Saravana
- Cinematography: P.S. Dharan
- Edited by: S. Satish; J.N. Harsha
- Music by: L. Vaidyanathan
- Release date: 26 December 2003
- Country: India
- Language: Tamil

Oruththi (transl. A Girl) is a 2003 Indian Tamil language film directed by Amshan Kumar.

It was selected for the 2003 International Film Festival of India and was screened in the Indian Panorama Section. It also won a special award from the Pondicherry government.

== Synopsis ==
Set in 1884 in rural South India, this film is an adaptation of a classic tale. Sevani (Poorvaja) with her bold nature brings timely relief to the entire village from their tyrannical landlord. Overwhelmed, the villagers want to repay their gratitude. However, they find the oppressed caste girl Sevani's proposal to marry the dominant caste boy Ellappan (Ganesh) totally unthinkable. It is a blow to the innocent Sevani who comes to realize that everything is judged not by what people do but by the caste into which they are born. Sevani does not agree to anything less than a proper marriage. She opposes their decision and chooses to be with the people of her own caste. Her only possession is a quill pen left by the visiting English official (Thomas Ober), the strokes of which changed the destiny of the village people .

The film is considered a celebration of the indomitable will of a girl challenging the social customs, and by her very act, she sows the early seeds for emancipation of women.

== Cast ==
- Poorvaja as Sevani
- Ganesh Babu as Ellappan
- Raju
- Balasingh
- Bharati Mani
- Thomas Ober
- Ram Saravana

== Reception ==
Oruththi received critical acclaim, with reviewers praising the film for its natural treatment. The music by L.Vaidyanathan also received positive reception.
