= Vannathupoochi =

- Promotional poster
- Directed by: C. Azhagappan
- Produced by: C. Azhagappan
- Starring: Sri Lakshmi; Siddharth; Madhavi Sharma; Bala Singh
- Music by: Rehan
- Production company: Mother Arts International
- Release date: 7 August 2009
- Country: India
- Language: Tamil

Vannathupoochi (transl. Butterfly) is a 2009 Indian Tamil-language children's film directed by C. Azhagappan and starring newcomers Sri Lakshmi, Siddharth and Madhavi Sharma alongside Bala Singh.

== Cast ==
- Sri Lakshmi as Divyabharathi
- Siddharth as Arun
- Madhavi Sharma as Chitra
- Chaya Devi
- Sarath
- Karthik
- Dhanush
- Ponnur Babu
- Meshak
- Bala Singh as Chinnasamy
- Revathi as a judge (guest appearance)
- Amudha Bharathi
- V. Vimalraj
- Ramesh
- Naren
- Mahanadi Dinesh

== Production ==
The film marked the directorial debut of Azhagappan, who previously assisted Kamal Haasan.

== Soundtrack ==
The music was composed by Rehan.

Track listing
No.	Title	Lyrics	Singer(s)	Length
1.	"Eai Vangada"		Mukesh	3:32
2.	"Elamai Konjam"		Prasanna, Priya	5:18
3.	"Katril Katril"	Palani Bharathi	Hemambika, Ghana Sundara	4:25
4.	"Mazhai Varum"		Krishna Raj	4:43
5.	"Ore Oru"		Padmapriya	3:40
6.	"Yaarukul Yaaro"		Prasanna	3:07
Total length:				24:45

== Reception ==
A critic from The New Indian Express wrote that "The deep bonding between a rustic grandpa and his city-bred little grand daughter, each filling up the emotional void in the other, is narrated with a fair amount of interest in Vannathupoochi. The film carries a relevant message to the parents, on the importance of sensitising themselves to the emotional needs of their children". A critic from Dinamalar wrote that Azhagappan should be commended for capturing the children's future and urban parents who forget the present and live mechanically and the children indecencies beautifully and vividly. In a mixed review, a critic from IANS rated the film two out of five stars and wrote that "Rasi Azhhagappan can be appreciated for taking a theme that is far from commercial cliches, but at the same time he fails to handle it with maturity".

== Awards ==
Sri Lakshmi won the Tamil Nadu State Film Award for Best Child Artist for her role in the film.
