= Kannagi Nagar =

Indian Tamil-language romantic thriller film

- Theatrical release poster
- Directed by: Dheena
- Written by: Dheena
- Produced by: Dr. Rajeev Madhavan Menon
- Starring: Gautham; Dheepa Umapathi; Muthuraj
- Cinematography: Mohammed Farhan
- Edited by: Marish & K. Manikandan
- Music by: Deva
- Production company: Rajeev Menon Studios
- Distributed by: Premaalaya Studios
- Release date: 5 December 2025
- Country: India
- Language: Tamil

Kannagi Nagar is a 2025 Indian Tamil-language romantic thriller film written and directed by Dheena. The film is produced by Dr. Rajeev Madhavan Menon under the banner Rajeev Menon Studios, with distribution by Premaalaya Studios. The film stars Gautham, Dheepa Umapathi, Muthuraj, Bala Singh, and Ko. Raviraj in prominent roles.

== Cast ==
- Gautham
- Dheepa Umapathi
- Muthuraj
- Bala Singh
- Ko. Raviraj

== Production ==
The film written and directed by Dheena. The film is produced by Dr. Rajeev Madhavan Menon under the banner Rajeev Menon Studios.The cinematography is handled by Mohammed Farhan, with editing by Marish and K. Manikandan. The music is composed by Deva .

== Reception ==
Maalai Malar critic wrote that "Kannagi Nagar, the way it is presented is wonderful."

Virakesari critic stated that "Even though it is a typical story, what will be the final outcome of a person after losing their relationship? The way the director has described it is commendable."
