= Sankarankovil (film) =

- Directed by: P. N. Palanivelraja
- Written by: P. N. Palanivelraja; Kanal Kannan
- Produced by: Hemavathi Kannan
- Starring: Kanal Kannan Rupika Ramnath Nassar
- Cinematography: T. Ram Thulasi
- Music by: Rajni; Vivek
- Production company: Sivadharshini Cine Aarts
- Release date: 12 August 2011
- Country: India
- Language: Tamil

Sankarankovil is a 2011 Indian Tamil language film directed by P. N. Palanivelraja. The film is produced and co-written by Kanal Kannan, who stars in the lead role, alongside Rupika Ramnath. It was released on 12 August 2011.

== Cast ==
- Kanal Kannan as Kathir
- Rupika Ramnath as Valli
- Nassar
- Ponvannan as Mahalingam
- Rohini
- Swarnamalya
- Ganja Karuppu as Kili Pillai
- Singampuli
- Livingston
- J. Senthil
- Chaams
- G. M. Kumar
- Mu Ramaswamy
- Tharun Kumar
- George Maryan
- Prabhu as Muthuvel

== Production ==
Following the release of Satrumun Kidaitha Thagaval in January 2009, Kanal Kannan met the media to announce his second acting project titled Sankarankovil in February 2009. He announced that Nassar and Lal would star in the film, set in the town of Sankarankovil. Debutant Rupika Ramnath was signed on to play the lead role in the film. The film's soundtrack was composed by Rajni, with newcomer Vivek working on the film's score. The film's audio release event was attended by industry personalities including Vijay, Jayam Ravi and AR Murugadoss among others.

== Reception ==
The film was released on 12 August 2011. A reviewer from Dina Malar gave the film a negative review, criticising the script. Rohit Ramachandran of Nowrunning.com wrote "Sankaran Kovil squeezes all the life out of you, suspends you by your eyelids and leaves you to hang dry." and gave the film half a star out of five. In contrast, a reviewer from FridayMoviez.com noted "director Palanivel Raja has made Sankaran Kovil as entertaining as possible even with an overused story line."

The film performed poorly at the box office.
