= Devathai =

- Directed by: Nassar
- Produced by: Nassar
- Starring: Vineeth; Keerthi Reddy; Nassar
- Cinematography: Sreedharan
- Edited by: Suresh Urs
- Music by: Ilaiyaraaja
- Production company: Indus Film Factory
- Release date: 27 June 1997
- Country: India
- Language: Tamil

Devathai (transl. Angel) is a 1997 Indian Tamil-language supernatural thriller film written, directed and produced by Nassar. The film stars himself, Vineeth and Keerthi Reddy (in her Tamil film debut), while the film's score and soundtrack are composed by Ilaiyaraaja. The film released in June 1997 to positive reviews, however it ended up becoming an average grosser at the box office. The film's story was loosely based on 1992 American film Bram Stoker's Dracula and novel of the same name.

== Plot ==
The film centres on Shasangan, a dacoit who starts off as a Robin Hood type before lapsing into mass, and merciless, killings. He then falls in love with the daughter of one of his captives, Devi, only to be spurned. The dejected dacoit commits suicide. Years later, the girl is reborn in Dubai as Kayal, grows up, falls in love and is on the verge of getting married when she makes a visit to India, to the family's ancestral home. Disturbing thoughts, hallucinations and meetings with a bearded man who is, though she doesn't know it just yet, Shasangan reborn, mark the visit. The rest of the story traces Shasangan's intentions of trying to convince the girl of their previous life characters.

== Cast ==
- Vineeth as Umapathi
- Keerthi Reddy as Devi / Kayal
- Nassar as Shasangan
- Janagaraj as Kayal's father
- Thalaivasal Vijay as Kamusigha
- K. B. Mohan as Umapathi's friend
- Sathyapriya as Kayal's mother
- Kalairani as a villager
- Tanjai Ramasamy as the seer
- Lavanya

== Production ==
After the failure of his directorial debut, Avatharam, Nassar claimed he "remembered a story I [he] had first heard as a child, it stayed with me and gave me the creative seed for this film", talking about how he picked to make a story on reincarnation. Nassar struggled to find an apt actress to play the lead role and even advertised in newspapers asking potential actors to audition, before finding and finalising on Telugu actress Keerthi Reddy. Vineeth was signed on for a supporting role, while professor of Drama, M. Ramasamy was also given a role. Nassar himself portrayed a prominent character in the film. He recalled that a famous actor of that time was signed to do the role in the film but he backed out in the last minute, fearing his image and also the actor wanted some changes in the script, which Nassar was not willing to do.

The authorities in Dubai initially were reluctant to let Nassar shoot his film there, as a previous Tamil filmmaker had depicted the city in poor light. Eventually the actor-director was able to convince them to let him shoot his film in the city after providing them with an entire script.

The art director, Trotsky Marudu, revealed that he worked very hard during the portions in the first 30 minutes of the film, with the sets, costumes, weapons, make-up having to be similar to conditions 300 years ago. Nassar and Marudhu further proceeded to incorporate graphics into the film, using "Flint" software, to create several special effects scenes in the film.

== Soundtrack ==
The soundtrack was composed by Ilaiyaraaja.

Track listing
No.	Title	Lyrics	Singer(s)	Length
1.	"Deepangal Pesum"	Arivumathi	S. P. B. Charan, Sandhya, K. P. Mohan
2.	"Andam Kidukidunga"	K. A. Gunasekaran	K. A. Gunasekaran
3.	"Engey En Kadhali"	Ponniyin Selvan	Karthik Raja
4.	"Kokkarako Kozhi"	Ilaiyaraaja	Janagaraj
5.	"Naal Thorum"	Kamakodiyan	Ilaiyaraaja, Kavita Krishnamurthy
6.	"Oru Naal Antha"	Arivumathi	S. Janaki

== Reception ==
K. N. Vijiyan of New Straits Times wrote, "It is hoped [Nassar] would come out with a better movie next time. Or better still, he should dedicate himself fulltime to acting where his talents seem to lie." Kalki praised Nassar for making a fantasy film with realism and also for depicting ancient period with realism. D. S. Ramanujam of The Hindu wrote "The story line may be fickle and time-worn but Nasser as the director, who also plays the merciless invader gives a boost to the depiction". The film became a financial failure, prompting Nassar to sign many films in a rush to pay off his debts. He revealed that his immediate busy schedule had subsequently cost him a role in Lagaan (2001).
