= Pidgin (film) =

- Title card
- Directed by: Andrea Gropplero
- Screenplay by: Andrea Gropplero
- Produced by: Andrea Gropplero
- Starring: Anna Scaglione; Yuhi Sethu
- Cinematography: Gianenrico Bianchi
- Edited by: Daniela Bassani
- Music by: Giovanni Venosta; Roberto Musci
- Distributed by: Filmalpha
- Release date: 1994
- Country: Italy
- Languages: English; Hindi

Pidgin is a 1994 Italian English-language short film directed by Andrea Gropplero, starring Anna Scaglione and Yuhi Sethu. The film's title Pidgin refers to how Scaglione's character speaks broken English (Pidgin) since she is from Italy.

== Plot ==
While walking the busy streets of India, an Italian woman Anna stops at a roadside shop to wipe her glasses. A man named into her and Ram accidentally steps on her glasses, breaking them. She gets into taxi that Ram is sitting in and he assures her that he can take her to the best glasses store to fix her glasses. While at the store, Ram helps Anna communicate by translating whatever she says to the optician in Hindi. While the optician is fixing her glasses, Ram remarks that Anna looks beautiful without her glasses. As they leave the store, a confident Anna removes her glasses and appreciates her natural appearance.

The film ends with a quote in Italian: Dobbiamo portare una lingua miñore dentro la nostra propria lingua maggiore. (transl. We need to bring a smaller language into our own bigger language.) – G. Deleuze, F. Guattari. The quote refers to how the two lead characters understood each other despite not having the same English fluency and how that aspect of emotional understanding should be used in the language we speak.

== Cast ==
- Anna Scaglione as Anna
- Yuhi Sethu as Ram
- Sidavari Gani as the optician

== Production ==
Yuhi Sethu worked on this short during a period of time when he left films and started traveling the world.

== Awards and selections ==
Anna Scaglione won the Best Actress award at the Sacher Festival in Rome, Italy. The short was selected to be part of the 15° Festival Internazionale Cinema Giovani in 1997.
