= Varmam (film) =

- Directed by: A. S. Lawrence Madhavan
- Written by: A. S. Lawrence Madhavan
- Produced by: S. Hanifa; S. Arunachalakumar
- Starring: Akilan; Anaka
- Cinematography: W. Paul Gragory
- Edited by: J. Jaishankar
- Music by: Meeralal
- Production company: Crescent Creations
- Release date: 11 February 2011
- Running time: 115 minutes
- Country: India
- Language: Tamil

Varmam is a 2011 Indian Tamil language vigilante film directed by A. S. Lawrence Madhavan. The film stars Akilan and Anaka, with Mohan Kumar, Neelakandan, Bhuvana, Soori, Nizhalgal Ravi, Bala Singh and Meera Krishnan playing supporting roles. The film had musical score by Meeralal and was released on 11 February 2011.

== Plot ==
The film begins with a person dressed as a transgender killing a pimp in the middle of the night. A beauty parlour owner is then killed in her parlour. In the meantime, Vidya (Anaka) falls in love with the hardware engineer Siva (Akilan). One day, the textile shop owner Kishore peeps at Siva's neighbour in the change room of his shop, he then blackmails her and forces her to come at his home the same night. That night, Siva saves her and kills the shop owner. The police find out that the killer is Siva and Siva is now on the run. The police find Siva's parents in a remote village and they tell them everything.

In the past, Siva lived happily with his parents and his sister Nandhini. For her studies, Nandhini left her village and stayed in a hostel in the city. Her roommate and her boyfriend Kishore found Nandhini attractive and sold her to the pimp Swamy (Bala Singh). Siva came to the hostel with gifts to celebrate her birthday, but he was disappointed that Nandhini wasn't there and left the place. Meanwhile, Nandhini was raped multiple times by various customers and Swamy decided to sell her to a politician. That night, in a car, Nandhini escaped from there half-naked and the customer was killed. Siva who was on the bus noticed her and Swamy and the car driver followed her but she ended up impaled on spikes. A heartbroken Siva incinerated her body that night. A vengeful Siva then killed the car driver (the pimp), her roommate (beauty parlour owner) and Kishore.

Siva's next target is none other than Swamy who is now a corrupt politician. The police arrest Swamy for pimping but he is soon released by the court. Siva then kidnaps Swamy and takes him at the place where his sister was cremated. The film ends with Siva killing Swamy.

== Cast ==
- Akilan as Siva
- Anaka as Vidya
- Mohan Kumar
- Neelakandan
- Bhuvana as Nandhini
- Soori as Guna
- Nizhalgal Ravi as Chidambaram, Siva's father
- Bala Singh as Swamy
- Meera Krishnan as Siva's mother
- Neelu
- Hema
- Lalitha Paatti
- Crane Manohar as Muniswamy
- Scissor Manohar as Auto rickshaw driver
- Muthukaalai as Deliveryman
- C. Ganesan
- Kumarbala
- Mullai
- Cheyyar Selvadurai
- R. Umadevi
- Dhyana as Journalist
- Telephone Raj as Asari
- Risha in a special appearance

== Production ==
A. S. Lawrence Madhavan made his directorial debut with Varmam under the banner of Crescent Creations. Akilan was selected to play the hero while a model from Kerala Anaka played his love interest. The film had in the supporting cast Nizhalgal Ravi, Bala Singh, Meera Krishnan and Soori. Meeralal composed the music, J. Jaishankar took care of editing and the cinematography was by W. Paul Gragory.

== Soundtrack ==
Varmam

Soundtrack album by Meeralal
- Released: 2010
- Recorded: 2010
- Genre: Feature film soundtrack
- Length: 17:26
- Producer: Meeralal

The soundtrack was composed by Meeralal. The soundtrack, released in 2010, features 4 tracks.

All lyrics are written by Kavimukil.

Tracklist
No.	Title	Length
1.	"Excuse Me Da"	4:33
2.	"Thathom Thadikinathom"	3:38
3.	"Anbe Engal"	5:04
4.	"Kichchu Thambulam"	4:11
Total length:		17:26

== Release ==
The film was released on 2 February 2011 alongside four other films.

Kungumam praised the performance of Akilan. Dinamalar gave the film a mixed review.
