= Vaaitha =

2022 Tamil language drama film

- Theatrical release poster
- Directed by: Mahivarman C. S
- Written by: Mahivarman C. S
- Screenplay by: Mahivarman C. S
- Produced by: K. Vinothkumar
- Starring: Mu Ramaswamy; Nassar; Pugazh Mahendran
- Cinematography: R. J. Sethumurugavel Angharagan
- Edited by: Naresh Gunaseelan
- Music by: Loceshwaran C.
- Production company: Varaha Swamy Films
- Distributed by: Om Films
- Release date: 27 May 2022
- Running time: 117 mins
- Country: India
- Language: Tamil

Vaaitha is a 2022 Indian Tamil-language drama film written and directed by Mahivarman C. S. The film features Mu Ramaswamy, Nassar and Pugazh Mahendran, and was released on 27 May 2022.

== Cast ==
- Mu Ramaswamy as Appusamy
- Nassar
- Pugazh Mahendran as Vignesh
- Prasanna Balachandran as Muthusamy
- Powlen Jessica
- Regin Rose
- Thirunavukkarasu
- Muthu Azhagarsamy
- Rani Jaya
- Pradeep Durairaj as Constable Jayaprakash

== Plot ==
A poor laundry worker gets injured in a road accident and finds himself struggling for justice. He and his family suffers, due to conflicts among two different caste groups.

== Production ==
Mahivarman first started planning for the film in 2018, under the tile of Yegaali. The film marked the acting debut of Pugazh Mahendran, son of C. Mahendran, one of the state executive members of the Indian Communist Party.

The film's teaser was released by Raju Murugan in April 2022. The film was scheduled to release on 6 May 2022 but was pushed on the day of release to 27 May 2022, in an attempt to secure more screens.

== Reception ==
The film was released on 27 May 2022 across Tamil Nadu. A reviewer from the Times of India wrote "Vaaitha is an emotional social drama that deserves a watch", adding "the writing is so good that it makes us empathise with the central character, who becomes a victim of the evils in our society" and that "the only problem here is that it takes time for us to get used to the atmosphere that he builds". A critic from The Hindu called the film a "worthy effort". A reviewer from OTTPlay noted it was a "a bumpy legal drama that does not rise above the message".
