= Maayan (film) =

2001 film directed by Nassar

- Directed by: Nassar
- Written by: Sundara Thirumal
- Starring: Nassar; Roja; Vindhya; Ranjitha
- Cinematography: P. S. Dharan
- Edited by: Suresh Urs
- Music by: Deva
- Production company: Kana Film Makers
- Release date: 14 September 2001
- Country: India
- Language: Tamil

Maayan is a 2001 Indian Tamil-language drama film, directed by Nassar. The film stars himself, Roja and Vindhya, while Thalaivasal Vijay, Ranjitha and Vadivelu among others form an ensemble cast. Music for the film was composed by Deva and the film was released on 14 September 2001.

== Cast ==
- Nassar as Maayan
- Roja as Azhagamma
- Ranjitha as Gurumayi
- Pasupathy as Dominic Raj
- Vindhya
- Revathi
- Thalaivasal Vijay as Vengala Naidu
- Vadivukkarasi
- Vadivelu
- Bala Singh
- Thyagu
- K. R. Vatsala
- Mu Ramaswamy as Maayan's father
- Elango Kumaravel as Mokkaiyan
- Jayakumar as Suruli
- George Maryan as Appan Koonthan (Debut)

== Production ==
Nassar had originally planned only to direct the film, but after his initial choices for the lead actor – Prashanth and Ajith Kumar – pulled out, he chose to also portray the lead role. As a result, the film's production was delayed by over a year from early 1999. Actress Ranjitha made a comeback to acting with Maayan, after taking a three-year sabbatical post-marriage. The film also marked the first major role for Pasupathy, whose previous venture Marudhanayagam was shelved.

The first schedule of the shooting was held at Chennai and Chengelpet. The second schedule was then held at Tiruvannamalai and the forests of Thalaikonam.

== Soundtrack ==
Soundtrack was composed by Deva.

Song	Singers	Lyrics
"Alli Kulathu"	Ganga	Thamarai
"Koraiyum Theekum"	Srinivas	Ingulab
"Kuruthiyile"	S. Janaki	Pulamaipithan
"Mayavane"	Harini	Palani Bharathi
"Mathana"	Vadivelu	Chidambaranathan
"Oru Naadu"	Swarnalatha	Thamarai

== Reception ==
The Hindu wrote "CERTAIN CHARACTERS never get stale - Robin Hood for instance. But different incidents have to be weaved in every time if the story has to sell, especially when presented on celluloid. And this is what Nasser has tried in Kana Film Makers's Maayan. Sundara Thirumal's story takes off well, but flounders after the first half. And because it goes limp midway, the impact of the climax is considerably reduced. (The screenplay and dialogue are also by him)". Visual Dasan of Kalki praised Nassar's acting but panned his character design while also praising him for portraying folk arts and dances and Pasupathy's acting however he felt Nassar messed up in one aspect, when the screenplay is based on true events, the backdrop of the plot jumps for no reason hence the story kicks like a donkey. Chennai Online wrote "The narrative flows smoothly, though the second half could have been trimmed a little. Nasser is more focused and displays a firmer grasp over the medium than he had done in his earlier two directorial ventures".
