= Maayakoothu =

- Theatrical release poster
- Directed by: A.R. Raghavendra
- Written by: Nagarajan Kannan (Dialogues)
- Screenplay by: A.R. Raghavendra; M. Srinivasan
- Story by: A.R. Raghavendra; M. Srinivasan
- Produced by: Rahul Deva; Prasad Ramachandran
- Starring: Nagarajan Kannan; Delhi Ganesh; Mu Ramaswamy
- Cinematography: Sundar Ram Krishnan
- Edited by: Nagooran Ramachandran
- Music by: Anjana Rajagopalan
- Production companies: Rahul Movie Makers; Abimanyu Creations
- Release date: 11 July 2025
- Country: India
- Language: Tamil

Maayakoothu is a 2025 Indian Tamil-language crime drama fantasy film directed by A.R. Raghavendra. The film is produced by Rahul Deva and Prasad Ramachandran under the banners Rahul Movie Makers and Abimanyu Creations.

== Cast ==
- Nagarajan Kannan as Vasan
- Delhi Ganesh as Editor
- Mu Ramaswamy as Mentor
- Sai Dheena as Dhanapal
- S.K. Gaayathri as Indu
- Rekha Kumanan as Radhika
- Murugan Govindasamy as Auto Driver Chandru
- Pragatheeswaran as Raji's Father
- Aishwarya Ragupathi as Selvi

== Production ==
The film is produced by Rahul Deva and Prasad Ramachandran under Rahul Movie Makers and Abimanyu Creations. The cinematography is handled by Sundar Ram Krishnan, editing by Nagooran Ramachandran, and the original score and songs are composed by Anjana Rajagopalan.

== Reception ==
Kirubhakar Purushothaman of News 18 rated four star out of five and stated that "Maayakoothu is another example of how indie filmmakers and small-budget films reach greater heights of storytelling and immense depth in philosophical thought than our mainstream cinema." Narayani M of Cinema Express gave 3/5 stars and wrote "Maayakoothu effectively blends realism with surrealism to showcase the battle between cynicism and optimism. It presents the need for responsibility in various forms of art, even when you can see the climax from afar, even when truth is withheld with a purpose, even when the magic of art itself is dying." Abhinav Subramanian of The Times of India gave 2.5/5 stars and wrote "Maayakoothu is one of those films where you find yourself rooting for the concept more than the movie itself–which is both its charm and its problem."
