= Luthfudeen =

Indian actor

- Born: Luthfudeen Basha Nassar; 30 April 1994 (age 32); Chennai, India
- Occupation: Actor
- Years active: 2014–present
- Father: Nassar

Luthfudeen (born 30 April 1994) is an Indian actor, who has appeared in Tamil language films. The son of actor Nassar, Luthfudeen made his debut as an actor by appearing in A. L. Vijay's Saivam (2014), before working in Vijay's Idhu Enna Maayam (2015) and Parandhu Sella Vaa (2016).

== Early life ==
Luthfudeen was born into a Tamil-speaking family and is the son of Indian actor Nassar and producer Kameela Nassar. He has two brothers, with his elder brother Noorul Hassan Faizal being involved in a serious traffic collision in 2014 but later recovered after being critically injured. His younger brother Abi Hassan is also an actor and featured in his father's independent film Sun Sun Thatha (2012).

== Career ==
Luthfudeen was cast by casting director Shanmugarajan to feature as a young adult in A. L. Vijay's family drama Saivam (2014). Totally untrained as an actor, he signed on to appear in the film without telling his father, the veteran actor Nassar, who had previously crusaded a campaign that actors should be trained. In the film, he was credited as Luthfudeen Baasha, after director Vijay felt that Luthfudeen would be difficult for the audience to remember. Nassar suggested that his father's name "Basha" was added as a suffix. The film opened to positive reviews and performed well at the box office, with a critic noting that he "shines". Following the release of Saivam, Luthfudeen took time to study acting and spent two weeks at an acting workshop in Pondicherry conducted by the performance company, Adishakti. He also spent time with N. K. Sharma of Act 1, a Delhi-based theatre group. He was then offered another supporting role by Vijay to star in his romantic comedy, Idhu Enna Maayam (2015). Co-starring alongside Vikram Prabhu and Keerthy Suresh, Luthfudeen portrayed a timid character who goes through a transformation in order to find a girlfriend.

In 2016, he worked on his first film, the romantic comedy Parandhu Sella Vaa (2016), as the leading actor. The film was entirely shot in Singapore and featured Luthfudeen opposite actresses Aishwarya Rajesh and Narelle Kheng.

== Filmography ==
Year	Film	Role	Notes
2014	Saivam	Senthil	Credited as Luthfudeen Baasha; Debut Film
2015	Idhu Enna Maayam	Venky	
2016	Parandhu Sella Vaa	Sampath	Main Lead, Debut as Hero
2017	Magalir Mattum	Younger Gothandaraman	
2019	Charlie Chaplin 2	'Mimicry' Manish	
2022	Kutty Story	"Naanum Oru Gamer" VJ	Anthology film; segment "Lokham"
2026	Sardar 2	Younger Shekhar Dattatri	
