= Palur, Kanchipuram district =

Palur
- Village
- Location in Tamil Nadu, India Palur (India)
- Coordinates: 12°45′55″N 79°54′24″E
- Country: India
- State: Tamil Nadu
- District: Kanchipuram
- Talukas: Chengalpattu Taluk

Languages
  - Official: Tamil
- Time zone: UTC+5:30 (IST)
- Nearest city: Chengalpattu and Kancheepuram

Palur is a small village in Chengalpattu district, Tamil Nadu in India. Suburban trains running between Chennai Beach - Chengalpattu - Tirumalpur section and Chengalpattu - Arakkonam section will stop here at Palur railway station. A Sivan Koil is located in this small village and this temple is known as Tirukaleeswarar temple.

IRCTC (Indian Railways) had set-up a packaged drinking water plant named Railneer at Palur. Water bottles of Railneer (Palur) are sold in major railway stations and trains of southern railways.

It connects Industrial area of Oragadam - Sriperumbudur where MSME industries operate and Nissan, Royal Enfield, Apollo Tyres, etc.

Palur railway station code is "PALR".

Chengalpattu to Palur Train Schedule

CGL PALR Train No. Train Name
08:20 08:32 156SR Chengalpattu-Arakkonam passenger
08:35 08:57 BTL1 Chengalpattu–Tirumalpur EMU
18:15 18:31 196SR Pondicherry–Tirupati passenger
19:20 19:35 BTL3 Chengalpattu–Tirumalpur EMU
20:20 20:30 152SR Chengalpattu–Arakkonam passenger
20:45 21:07 BTL5 Chengalpattu–Tirumalpur EMU

Palur to Chengalpattu Train Schedule

PALR CGL Train No. Train Name
05:55 06:15 TLB2 Tirumalpur–Chengalpattu EMU
06:51 07:15 151SR Arakkonam–Chengalpattu Passenger
07:42 07:55 TLB4 Tirumalpur–Chengalpattu EMU
08:51 09:13 195SC Tirupati–Pondicherry Passenger
10:50 11:10 TLB6 Tirumalpur–Chengalpattu
18:31 19:10 TLB6 Arakkonam-Chengalpattu Passenger

For updated train timings please refer http://www.srailway.com/sutt/cgl-tmpl-cgl.php

Indian Railway Catering and Tourism Corporation (IRCTC) is planning to set up its mineral water manufacturing plant (which is called as Rail Neer plant) at Palur.
