= Gopalla Grammam =

1976 novel by Ki. Rajanarayanan

Gopalla Gramam
- Author: Ki. Rajanarayanan
- Language: Tamil
- Genre: Historical, Romance, Thriller, fiction
- Publication date: 1976
- Publication place: India

Gopalla Gramam (transl. People of Gopalla Village) is a Tamil-language novel by Ki. Rajanarayanan. A sequel, Gopallapurathu Makkal , was published in 1989 and won Sahitya Akademi Award in 1991.

== Overview ==
Gopalla Gramam discusses the mass exodus of a small village in present-day Andhra Pradesh in India, travelling south, eventually finding a place Kovilpatti in Tamil Nadu. The novel includes timelines of Islamic kings in Andhra Pradesh, transition of other kingdoms in southern part of India, the British invasion of India and part of India's freedom struggle. Ki. Rajanarayanan mentioned about the existence of collection of stories about the exodus in oral traditions of south India. Along the way, the novel shows the formation of modern infrastructure in South India. The novel also shows a rarely documented phenomenon of how the people of India accepted the British rule.

== Accolades ==
The sequel Gopallapurathu Makkal won the Sahitya Akademi Award in 1991. Writer and literary critic Jeyamohan wrote a detailed critique on Gopalla Gramam and its sequel Gopallapurathu Makkal and considers them as a pioneering Novel that started a new genre of novels.

The folk song mentioned in the novel Gopalla Gramam was set to music for the first time by composer Raleigh Rajan. The song is referenced as about 500 years old and was sung by the original settlers of Kovilpatti area. Sung by Ananya Bhat, Rajalakshmi Senthil, Raleigh Rajan and Priya Krish.

== Translations ==
Gopalla Gramam has been translated into English by a couple of different publishing houses. Vishnupuram USA and M Vijayalakshmi both have translated Gopalla Gramam.
