= Manusangada =

2017 Indian film by Amshan Kumar

- Directed by: Amshan Kumar
- Screenplay by: Amshan Kumar
- Produced by: S.Thara; Gana.Natkunan
- Starring: Rajeev Anand; Manimegalai; A.S.Sasikumar; Sheela Rajkumar; Vidhur Rajarajan; Sethu Darwin; Anand Sampath
- Cinematography: P.S. Dharan
- Edited by: Dhanasekar
- Music by: Aravind–Shankar
- Production company: A K FILMS
- Release dates: 13 October 2017 (Jio MAMI); 12 October 2018
- Running time: 93 minutes
- Country: India
- Language: Tamil

Manusangada (English title: We are Humans) is a 2017 Indian Tamil-language indie drama film directed by Amshan Kumar. The film is based on a true story about the signaling of the rise of Dalit struggles in contemporary India against long standing human rights violations. The title 'Manusangada' is from Inquilab's poem of the same name and literally means 'We are humans too.'

The film had its world priemere in Jio MAMI Mumbai Film Festival and its International Premiere at the Cairo International Film Festival. It was also selected in the Indian Panorama section of International Film Festival of India, Goa and was the only Tamil film to be selected that year. The film has also won the Best Feature Film award from the Puducherry Government in its 35th Indian Panorama Festival.

== Synopsis ==
When Kolappan's father dies, Kolappan is not allowed to carry his father's body through the common pathway because he is a Dalit. He seeks help from official powers, only to find that they are equally casteist. Refusing to be cowed down, Kolappan begins a protest and finds his village standing by him. Based on an actual incident, Kolappan's story is a look at the deeply-embedded prejudice that Dalits have endured and against which they are rising.

== Cast ==
- Rajeev Anand as Kolappan
- Manimegalai
- A.S.Sasikumar
- Sheela Rajkumar as Revathy
- Vidhur Rajarajan
- Sethu Darwin
- Anand Sampath

== Development and production ==
Amshan Kumar chanced upon a news clipping of the incident in 2016, he set aside a screenplay of a William Shakespeare adaptation that he had been working on. Manusangada was shot with a handheld camera in a series of shots with the aesthetic that reflects the reality at hand. Kumar wanted to film it in a docu-drama style with a tragic narrative. The filming was completed in 22 days and was shot on location.

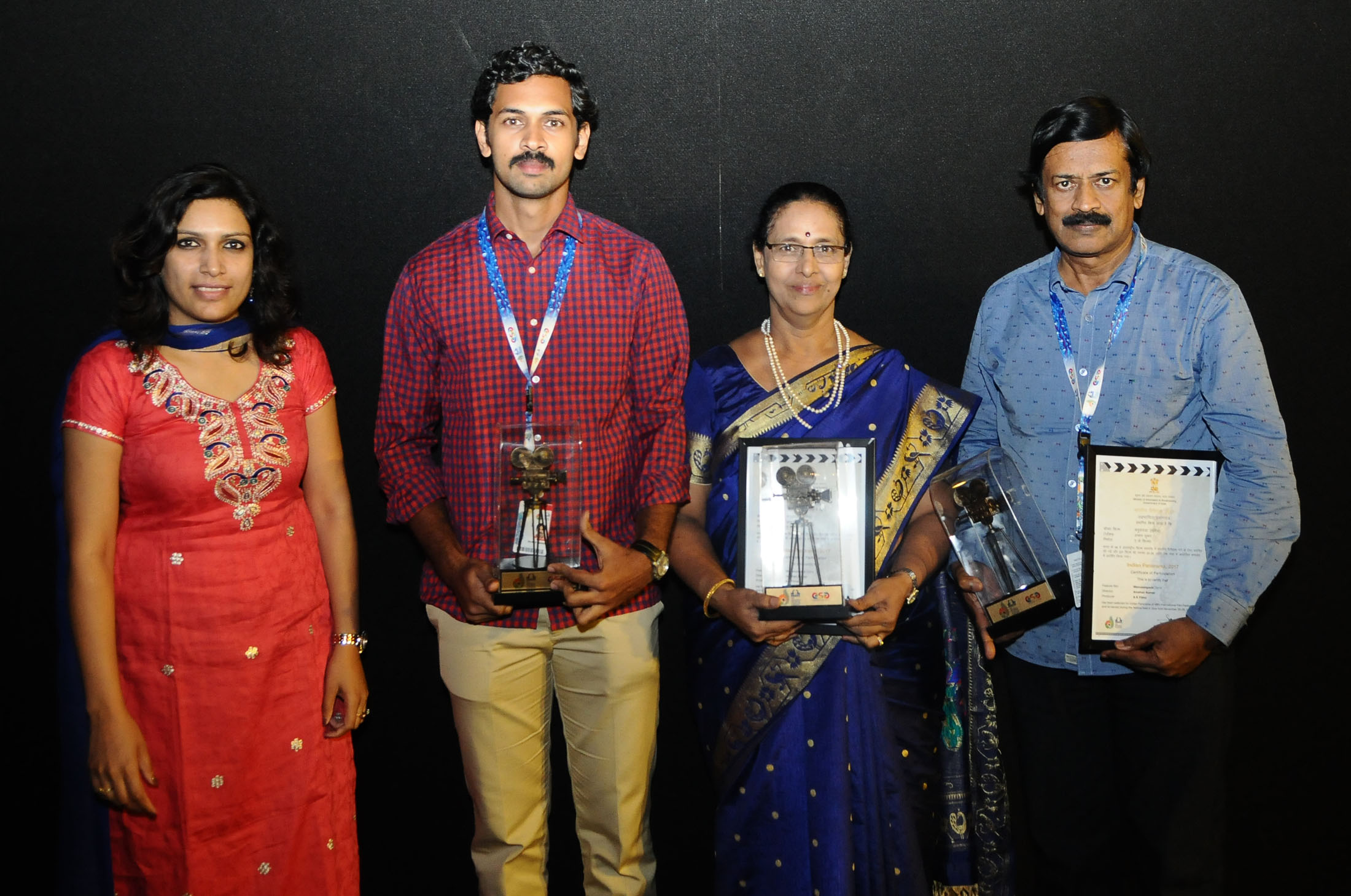
Film crew, IFFI (2017)

== Awards and film festivals ==
- Best Feature Film Award, Government of Puducherry, Indian Panorama

The film was screened at the following Film festivals:

- 19th Jio Mami Film Festival
- Cairo International Film Festival
- Indian Panorama section of International Film Festival of India
- Chennai International Film Festival
- ICFT UNESCO Gandhi Medal
- Pune International Film Festival
- Thrissur International Film Festival
- 13th Habitat Film Festival
- Solapur International film festival
- Orange City Film Festival
- ChintaBar 2K18 Film Festival
- Tamil Nadu State Film Award for Best Film (Special Prize)
