= Kavithai Paada Neramillai =

- Title card
- Directed by: Yugi Sethu
- Screenplay by: Yugi Sethu
- Story by: N. Chandra
- Produced by: Yugi Sethu
- Starring: Amala; Shanawas
- Music by: L. Vaidyanathan
- Production company: Mayascope Film Company
- Release date: 17 June 1987
- Country: India
- Language: Tamil

Kavithai Paada Neramillai (transl. No time to sing a poem) is a 1987 Indian Tamil-language film directed by Yugi Sethu in his debut. The film stars Amala and Shanawas. It is a remake of the 1986 Hindi film Ankush. The film was released on 17 June 1987.

== Cast ==
- Amala
- Shanawas
- Nassar
- Raghuvaran
- Yugi Sethu
- Cheenu Mohan
- Jai Ganesh
- Sangili Murugan
- Soorya
- Bala Singh

== Soundtrack ==
The music was composed by L. Vaidyanathan.

Track listing
No.	Title	Singer(s)	Length
1.	"Ilaiya Thalaimurai"	S. P. Balasubrahmanyam
2.	"Puttham Pudhu Ulagam"	S. Janaki, L. Vaidyanathan
3.	"Pulliyai Vaithavan"	K. J. Yesudas
4.	"Thodu Vaanam"	S. Janaki, Rajkumar Bharathi, L. Vaidyanathan
