= K. Rajanarayanan =

Indian Tamil language folklorist and author (1923–2021)

Ki. Rajanarayanan
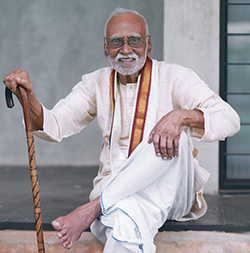
- Born: 16 September 1923; Idaiseval, Tinnevely District, Madras Presidency, British India (now in Thoothukudi District, Tamil Nadu, India)
- Died: 17 May 2021 (aged 97); Lawspet, Puducherry, India
- Spouse: Kanavathi Ammal (m. 1954; died 2019)
- Children: Diwakar; Prabhakar
- Writing career
- Pen name: Ki. Ra.
- Language: Tamil
- Period: 1938–2021
- Genres: Short story, novel
- Subjects: Folklores, Rural life
- Notable works: Gopalla Grammam; Gopallapurathu Makkal; Nattuppura Kadhai Kalanjiyam
- Notable awards: Sahitya Akademi Award (1991)
- Website: writerkira.com

Rayala Shri Krishna Raja Narayana Perumal Ramanujam Naicker (16 September 1923 – 17 May 2021), shortened to Ki. Rajanarayanan and popularly known by his Tamil initials as Ki. Ra., was an Indian Tamil language folklorist and writer from Kovilpatti, in Tamil Nadu. Some of his popular works include Gopalla Gramam (transl. Gopalla Village), Gopallapurathu Makkal (transl. The People of Gopallapuram), Mayamaan (transl. The Magical Deer), and Nattuppura Kadhai Kalanjiyam (transl. Collection of Country Tales). He was a recipient of the Sahitya Akademi Award in 1991.The Times of India called him the "Guardian of Tamil oral tradition".

== Early life ==
Rajanarayanan was born on 16 September 1923 in the village of Idaiseval near Kovilpatti in present-day Thoothukudi district, Tamil Nadu. He was the fifth child of Lakshmi Ammal and Shri Krishna Ramanujam. He suffered from poor health and was afflicted with tuberculosis at an early age. He dropped out of school in the seventh standard. He went on to become a member of the Communist Party of India (CPI), going to prison twice for his participation and support in the CPI-organised peasant rebellions between 1947 and 1951. He was also named in the Nellai Conspiracy Case of 1952, though the charges were later dropped.

== Career ==
Rajanarayanan began his literary career at the age of 30 and wrote under his Tamil initials Ki. Ra. His first short story "Mayamaan" (transl. "The Magical Deer") was published in the magazine Saraswati in 1959. It was an immediate success. It was followed by many more short stories. Ki. Ra.'s stories were usually based in karisal kaadu (transl. scorched, drought-stricken land) around his native region of Kovilpatti. The stories are usually centered around Karisal country's people, their lives, beliefs, struggles and folklore. Gopalla Grammam (transl. Gopalla Village) and its sequel Gopallapurathu Makkal (transl. The People of Gopallapuram) were among his novels. They present the stories of multiple people living in a village in south India before the arrival of the British. It involves the migration of the Telugu people escaping brutal kingdoms north of Tamil Nadu. These books were followed by Andaman Naicker.

As a folklorist, Ki. Ra. spent decades collecting folktales from the karisal kaadu and publishing them in popular magazines. In addition to writing stories in the regional dialects, he also was an author of a dictionary of the regional dialect called Karisal Kaatu Sollagarathi (transl. Words of the scorched land). This work was a frontrunner for similar dictionaries for dialects from other regions of the State.

He was appointed a professor of folklore at Pondicherry University in the 1980s. He held the title of Director of Folktales in the university's Documentation and Survey Centre. He was a recipient of the Sahitya Akademi Award for his novel Gopallapurathu Makkal in 1991. In 1992, his short story Current was made into a Hindi film entitled Current for the National Film Development Corporation of India. Between 1998 and 2002 he also served in the general council and the advisory board of the Sahitya Akademi.

In March 2003 (probably), he hosted the Italian anthropologist and Dravidologist Gabriella Eichinger Ferro-Luzzi in his home in Puducherry. In November of that year his short story kidai was made into a Tamil film entitled Oruththi and was screened at the International Film Festival of India.

In 2007, the Thanjavur-based publishing house Annam compiled these folktales into a 944-page book, the Nattuppura Kadhai Kalanjiyam (transl. collection of country tales). As of 2009, he had published approximately 30 books. A selection of these books were translated into English by Pritham K. Chakravarthy and published in 2009 as Where Are You Going, You Monkeys? – Folktales from Tamil Nadu. Ki. Ra. was also well known for his candid treatment of sexual topics, and use of the spoken dialect of Tamil for his stories, rather than its formal written form. He viewed the spoken language as the 'correct' form of the language.

== Personal life ==
On 16 September 1954, Rajanarayanan married Kanavathi Ammal (classmate of his younger sister Ethirajam; also a cousin). The couple had two sons. Kanavathi died on 25 September 2019. She was aged 87.

Rajanarayanan died on 18 May 2021 due to age-related illness in Puducherry. He was cremated with state honours in his native village of Idaiseval.

== Musical Adaptations ==
As a tribute to honor Ki.Ra, the folk song mentioned in the novel Gopalla Gramam was set to music for the first time by composer Raleigh Rajan. The song is referenced as about 500 years old and was sung by the original settlers of Kovilpatti area. Ki.Ra meticulously collected the lyrics of the song and included in the novel. This tribute was Sung by Sung by Ananya Bhat, Rajalakshmi Senthil, Raleigh Rajan and Priya Krish.

== Awards and recognition ==
- 1971 – Tamil valarchi araichi mandram award
- 1979 – Ilakkiya chinthanai award
- 1990 – Santhome International Christian Society Best Writer Award
- 1991 – Sahitya Akademi Award for his novel Gopallapurarthu Makkal
- 2008 – M.A. Chidambaram award
- 2016 – Literary achievement special award from The Tamil Literary Garden.

== Bibliography ==
=== Folktales ===
- Tamizhnattu nadodi kathaigal (1966)
- Tamizhnattu gramiya kathaigal (1977)
- Thatha chonna kathaigal (1984)
- Naattupura kathaigal part - 1(1991)
- Naattupura kathaigal part - 2(1992)
- Vayathu vanthavargalukku mattum (1992)
- Kaathil viluntha kathaigal (1992)
- Puthuvai vattara Naattupura kathaigal (1993)
- Naattupura paaliyal kathaigal (1994)
- Penn manam (1995)
- Peruviral kullan (1998)

=== Short stories ===
- Kathavu (1965)
- Kannimai (1975)
- Appa pillai, Amma pillai (1980)
- Kidai kurunavalum, pannirandu sirukathaigalum (1983)
- Karisal kathaigal (1984)
- Koththai paruththi (1985)
- Ki.Rajanarayanan kathaigal (1998)

=== Novels ===
- Mayamaan (lit. The magical deer) (1958)
- Gopalla gramam (1976)
- Pinchukal (1979)
- Gopallapurathu makkal (1989)
- Anthaman nayakkar (1995)

=== Essays ===
- Karisal kaatu kadidhasi (1988)
- Ki.Rajanarayanan katturaigal (1991)
- Puthaga kaathalar (1998)

=== Others ===
- Maantharul oru annaparavai (biographical sketches of Rasigamani) (1981)
- Vattara valakku sollakarathi (Dictionary) (1982)
- Ku.Azhagirisamy kadithankal (1987)
- Makkal Tamil vazhallku (1991)
- Karisal Kaattu kadudasi – volumes 1&2 (lit. letter from the scorched earth), Agaram (1991)
- Ki.Rajanarayanan pathilgal (1994)
- Kadithangal Kadithangal (1998)
- Maraivai sonna kathaikal (lit. Hidden stories)
- Oruthi (screenplay)(lit. One woman)(2003)
- (ed.)Nattuppura Kadhai Kalanjiyam (lit. Collection of Country Tales), Annam (2007)
- Ki. Ra. Natkurippilirundhu (lit. From the diary of Ki. Ra)
- Vetti

== See also ==
- List of Sahitya Akademi Award winners for Tamil
- List of Indian writers
- List of Tamil-language writers
