= Yugi Sethu =

Indian actor (born 1964)

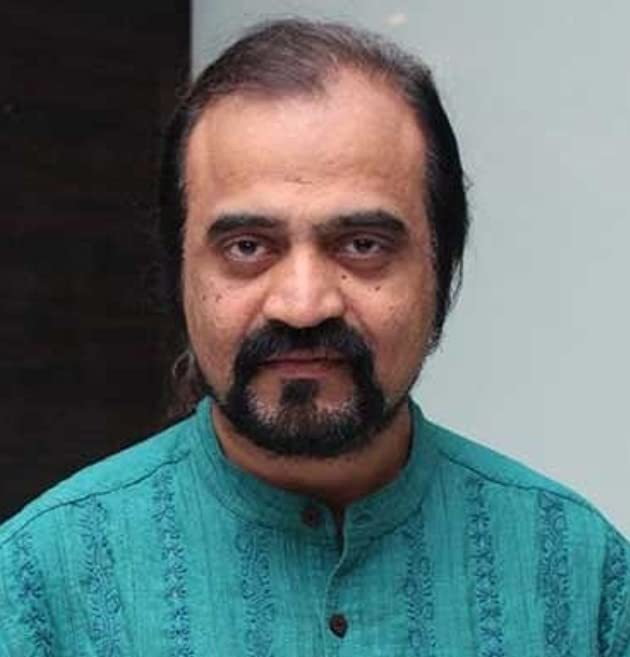
- Born: Sethuraman; 9 January 1964 (age 62); Madras, Madras State (now Chennai, Tamil Nadu), India
- Other names: Yuhi Sethu, Yuki Sethu
- Occupations: Film actor, screenwriter, director, producer, talk show host
- Years active: 1984–present
- Spouse: Amritha Kalyani
- Children: 2

Yugi Sethu is an Indian actor, filmmaker, writer, and television presenter who has worked in the Tamil film industry. He has been conferred doctorate (PhD) in cinema by the Madras University in July 2015, for his thesis 'Development of a new box office predictability model'. He has appeared in a few films in main and supporting roles and has contributed to films as a screenwriter. He has hosted the TV talk shows Nayyandi Darbar, Sethuvudan Darbar andYugiyudan Yugiyungal. He has been a jury since inception for popular Star Vijay TV Movie Awards.

== Early life ==
He is a native of Oothukadu, Tamil Nadu, India. He completed a bachelor of commerce degree and finished post-graduate studies in political science. He earned his moniker Yugi from college after being inspired by the character from the Sanskrit play Vasavadatta.

He was awarded a gold medal during his time at the Film and Television Institute of Tamil Nadu for his student project film, The Rhetoric of the Continuity, which had the distinction of being the only Indian film selected among 45 other international entries at the 1984 International Film Festival of India in New Delhi and Music, courtesy of Satyajit Ray.

== Career ==
He directed two films, Kavithai Paada Neramillai and Maathangal Ezhu. He acted in the lead in the Italian English short film Pidgin (1994). He distributed Shekar Kapur's Bandit Queen in Tamil Nadu. He attempted to import the film Erotic Tales to India, but was stopped by the censor board.

He played one of the leads in the comedy film Panchatanthiram (2002) and played an important role of a constable in Ramanaa (2002). Despite the success of Panchatanthiram, Yugi Sethu cited a lack of interest in comedy films. He wrote the story for K. S. Ravikumar's Tamil film Villain, starring Ajith Kumar.

== Filmography ==
=== As an actor ===
Year	Title	Role	Notes	Ref.			
Year	Title	Role	Notes	Ref.	1987	Kavithai Paada Neramillai	Guna
1993	Maathangal Ezhu	Raja					
2002	Pammal K. Sambandam	Yugi Sethu					
2002	Panchathantiram	Vedham					
2002	Ramanaa	Saravanan					
2003	Anbe Sivam	Utthaman					
2006	Scream of the Ants	Taxi driver	Persian film (Credited as Yuhi Sethu)				
2010	Aasal	Don Samsa					
2013	Haridas	Ravi					
2015	Trisha Illana Nayanthara	Vikram					
2015	Thoongaa Vanam	T. I. Mani					
2015	Cheekati Rajyam	T. I. Mani	Telugu film				
2015	Oru Naal Iravil	Sethu Barathi					
2021	Kasada Thapara	Krishna	Streaming release				
2022	Sardar	Agent Karapanpoochi					
2025	Padai Thalaivan	Saravanan					
2026	Vowels - An Atlas of Love	Eros	Anthology film; segment: "Eros"				
2026	Train						

=== As a director, writer, and producer ===
Year	Title	Credited as			Notes	Ref.
Year	Title	Director	Writer	Producer	Notes	Ref.
1987	Kavithai Paada Neramillai	Yes	Screenplay	Yes		
1993	Maathangal Ezhu	Yes	Yes			
1997	Kalaiyur, le village des chefs			Line producer	French documentary	
2002	Villain		Story			
2010	Aasal		Yes			

=== Television ===
Year	Title	Role	Channel	Notes
1989	Jana	Jana		Television film
1999–2002	Nayyandi Darbar	Host	Vijay TV	

=== Short films ===
Year	Film	Role	Notes	Ref.
1984	The Rhetoric of the Continuity		As director	
1989	Water Flourosis			
1989	Indra Avaz Yojana			
1994	Pidgin	Ram	Italian film (Credited as Yuhi Sethu)	

== Awards ==
- Special Honorary Award - Vijay Television Awards (2013)
