= Avatharam (1995 film) =

- Poster
- Directed by: Nassar
- Written by: Nassar
- Produced by: Vaithyanathan
- Starring: Nassar; Revathi
- Cinematography: P. S. Dharan
- Edited by: M. N. Raja
- Music by: Ilaiyaraaja
- Production company: Kamalam Movies
- Distributed by: Kamalam Movies
- Release date: 9 June 1995
- Running time: 125 minutes
- Country: India
- Language: Tamil

Avatharam (transl. Avatar) is a 1995 Indian Tamil-language film written and directed by Nassar, making his directorial debut. The film stars him and Revathi. It was released on 9 June 1995 and failed at the box office, but won the Tamil Nadu State Film Award for Third Best Film.

== Plot ==
Kuppusamy, an innocent man, dreams about performing in Paandi's folk theatre troupe, which performs in Hindu festivals in rural Tamil Nadu. Baasi is expelled from the troupe for his bad behaviour. Finally, Paandi accepts Kuppusamy into his troupe, and Ponnamma, Paandi's blind daughter, falls in love with him.

Due to change in leadership of the temple committee, the festival's organisers prefer female dancers over Paandi's troupe. Paandi's troupe is abused by Baasi and the new temple chairman. Paandi pleads with them to perform, since the troupe used to perform regularly at village temple festival. Thereafter, Paandi dies during the stage performance, and the troupe splits up after argument over their inability to fend for themselves in life due to their dependency on folk drama as an occupation.

Kuppusamy leaves the village to Chennai with Ponnamma to become a film actor. They come across an advocate who allows them to stay for the night in her house for shelter and advises Kuppusamy to move back to the village. Kuppusamy tries one last chance and comes across Baasi, and he accommodates them. Baasi then rapes and kills Ponnamma. Kuppusamy is framed for rape and murder of Ponnamma and is branded as a lunatic by the judge in the court and is sent to a mental hospital, but he manages to escape. Kuppusamy is determined to take revenge on Baasi.

Baasi, fearing for his life, seeks protection from the police in order to catch Kuppusamy. Kuppusamy first kills the policemen. A fight ensues between Kuppusamy and Baasi, in which Kuppusamy kills Baasi.

== Cast ==
- Nassar as Kuppusamy
- Revathi as Ponnamma
- Bala Singh as Baasi
- Srividya as an advocate
- Delhi Ganesh as Paandi
- Vennira Aadai Moorthy as Singaram
- Sachu as Singaram's wife
- Kaka Radhakrishnan
- Junior Balaiah as Krishna
- Murali Kumar as Pungavanam
- Shanmugasundari as Marudhayi
- Vincent Roy as a police officer
- Thyagu as the temple chairman

== Production ==
Avatharam marked the directorial debut of Nassar. He said the idea for the film emerged from a visualisation of Narasimha slaying Hiranyakashipu. To portray Therukoothu authentically, he observed Therukoothu artistes for a year and completed writing the script within four months. Nassar revealed he was forced to include a revenge angle into the script for the sake of commercial viability.

== Soundtrack ==
The music was composed by Ilaiyaraaja. The song "Arithaaratha Poosikolla Aasai" is set to Keeravani raga, "Thendral Vanthu Theendumbothu" is set to Jaunpuri, and "Oru Gundu Mani Kulunguthadi" is set to Harikambhoji. "Thendral Vanthu Theendumbothu" was later reused in the Telugu film Yevade Subramanyam (2015) as "Challa Gaali".

All lyrics are written by Vaali, except where noted.

Track listing
No.	Title	Singer(s)	Length
1.	"Arithaaratha Poosikolla Aasai"	Ilaiyaraaja, S. Janaki	5:53
2.	"Chandirarum Sooriyarum"	Ilaiyaraaja	6:09
3.	"Kanni Randil Etri Vaikkum"	Chorus	2:53
4.	"Oru Gundu Mani Kulunguthadi"	Ilaiyaraaja	5:01
5.	"Thendral Vanthu Theendumbothu"	Ilaiyaraaja, S. Janaki, Ganesh Manivannan	5:24
6.	"Thondru Thottu Indru Varai" (Muthu Koothan)	Malaysia Vasudevan	5:32
Total length:			30:52

== Release and reception ==
Avatharam was released on 9 June 1995. Since no distributors were willing to take up this film due to lack of commercial elements, the film's producer had to distribute the film by himself throughout Tamil Nadu. K. N. Vijiyan of New Straits Times lauded the film, saying its only flaw was the cinematography: "Some scenes look blurry and dark". R. P. R. of Kalki praised Nassar's direction while also praising for portraying the life of Therukoothu artistes with authenticity and realism while also praising Ilaiyaraaja's songs and re-recording. However the film failed at the box office. It won the Tamil Nadu State Film Award for Third Best Film.

== Bibliography ==
- Sundararaman (2007) [2005]. Raga Chintamani: A Guide to Carnatic Ragas Through Tamil Film Music (2nd ed.). Pichhamal Chintamani. OCLC 295034757.
