= Saivam =

2014 Indian film by A. L. Vijay

- Theatrical release poster
- Directed by: Vijay
- Written by: Vijay
- Produced by: A. L. Azhagappan
- Starring: Nassar; Sara Arjun; Luthfudeen; Twara Desai; Vidya Pradeep
- Cinematography: Nirav Shah
- Edited by: Anthony
- Music by: G. V. Prakash Kumar
- Production company: Think Big Studios
- Distributed by: Red Giant Movies
- Release date: 27 June 2014
- Country: India
- Language: Tamil

Saivam (transl. Vegetarianism) is a 2014 Indian Tamil-language comedy drama film written, directed and produced by Vijay. The film features Nassar in the lead role and child actress Sara Arjun plays another pivotal role. The cinematography was handled by Nirav Shah and music composed by G. V. Prakash Kumar.

Saivam was released on 27 June 2014. It won two National Film Awards, two Filmfare Awards South and one Tamil Nadu State Film Award. The film was remade in Telugu as Dagudumootha Dandakor (2015), with Arjun reprising her role.

== Plot ==
Kathiresan Chettiyar is the head of a large family which consists of three sons and a daughter and their respective families. The families get together at the house for vacation. When the entire family goes to their temple on a given day, certain ill-fated events occur. The family believes that it is because it had forgotten to perform a ritual sacrifice which involves the slaughter of a rooster. This thought is fuelled all the more by each family member blaming this to be the cause for all their problems both at home and at work. Kathiresan decides to sacrifice Paappa, their pet rooster, in the upcoming festival, and the family is assured that all their problems will disappear eventually after the ritual. Then, suddenly, Paappa goes missing.

The members of the family are shocked at Paappa's disappearance and begin searching for it. It is revealed out that Kathiresan's granddaughter Tamizhselvi hid Paappa in the attic in order to save it from getting slaughtered, as she loves Paappa so much that she cannot stand to see it die. The rest of the story revolves around Tamizhselvi's attempts to save Paappa from being slaughtered and the family's attempts to find the rooster and performing the ritual.

Ultimately she convinces everyone not to kill Paappa, as God if he care for one species should care for others too.

In the mid-credit scene, everyone realises the truth and turn vegetarian indicating that they wouldn't harm any species.

== Cast ==
- Nassar as Kathiresan
- Sara Arjun as Tamizhselvi
- Luthfudeen as Senthil
- Twara Desai as Abhirami
- Suresh as Meiyappan
- Shanmugarajan as AL. K. S. Swamigal
- Vidya Pradeep as Thenmozhi, Tamizh's mother
- George Maryan as Raja
- Rajyalakshmi as Dhanalakshmi
- Ray Paul as Saravanan
- Lakshmanan Ganesh as Ganeshan
- Shakti as Kumaran
- KS Suchitra Shetty as Usha
- Kousalya as Vishalakshi
- Kalyani Natarajan as Meenakshi
- Vittal as Ramanathan
- Ravi as Balamurugan
- Master Rahil Singhi as Karthik
- Kala as Kala
- Savithri as Kamatchi
- Malathi as Servant

== Production ==
Saivam is the first film produced by director Vijay via his then newly established production studio, Think Big Studios. Production was underway by November 2013. The film was shot primarily in Karaikudi, Tamil Nadu, where filming lasted 38–40 days. Luthfudeen, son of actor Nassar, would make his acting debut in the film, playing the grandson of Nassar's character. He would appear alongside another debutant, Twara Desai. Vijay revealed that Saivam would be about family values and hoped it would instill lost family traditions into the audiences, noting that he was inspired by his visits back to his home village.

== Soundtrack ==
The soundtrack album is composed by G. V. Prakash Kumar. The album features five songs, with two instrumental tracks; all songs were written by Na. Muthukumar. It was released on 5 April 2014 at Chennai.

== Marketing and release ==
In April 2014, the release of Saivam was stalled due to a court order by SG Films. The film was eventually released on 27 June the same year. Red Giant Movies acquired the distribution rights. Prior to the film's release, the makers unveiled a tie-in game which revolves around a rooster trying to evade people catching it.

== Reception ==
S. Saraswathi of Rediff.com praised the film, saying "Good dialogues, great characterisation with opportunities for everyone to prove themselves, plenty of humour and a light-hearted romance makes this family drama an extremely engaging affair." M. Suganth of The Times of India said, "In all of his films so far, Vijay has struggled with the pacing but here, he is bang on and the slightly laid-back pace of the film fits its setting beautifully. It is no surprise that Saivam is his best — not to mention, his most original — film yet." Writing for The Hindu, Baradwaj Rangan praised it as "a film that infuses artistry into a generally light-hearted entertainment. You can sense that Saivam is an all-round labour of love. There isn't an iota of cynical calculation in it."

== Accolades ==
At the 62nd National Film Awards, Uthara Unnikrishnan won the award for Best Female Playback Singer for the song "Azhagu", becoming the youngest winner in that category, and Na. Muthukumar received the award for Best Lyricist for the same song. At the 62nd Filmfare Awards South, they won the Best Playback Singer – Female and Best Lyricist awards respectively, the film's only two nominations at the ceremony. Uthara also won the Tamil Nadu State Film Award for Best Female Playback Singer. However, her National Award win became the subject of controversy; singer Pradip Somasundaran felt she was undeserving of the award because her vocals seemed to have been adjusted through pitch correction software, and writer V. M. Girija criticised the jury for awarding the song, criticising its quality; she felt Uthara was not even worth the State Film Award.
