= Nassar (actor) =

Indian actor and director

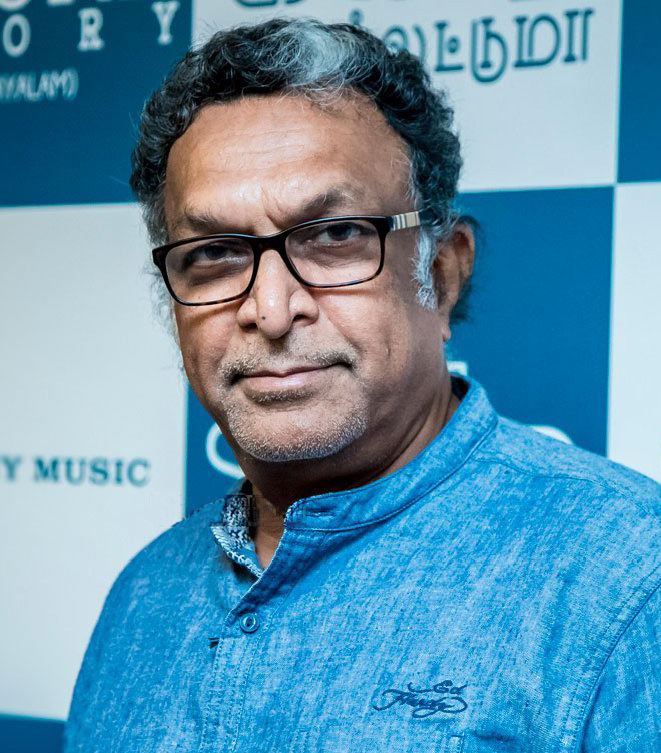
- Nassar at Oru Kadhai Sollatuma Audio Launch

President of South Indian Nadigar Sangam
- Incumbent
- Assumed office 19 October 2015
- Vice President: Karunas, Ponvannan
- Preceded by: R. Sarath Kumar

Personal details
- Born: Muhammad Hanif; 5 March 1958 (age 68) Palur, Chengalpattu, Madras State (now in Tamil Nadu), India
- Spouse: Kameela
- Children: 3, including Luthfudeen
- Occupation: Actor, producer, director
- Awards: Kalaimamani Award (1998)

Nassar (born Muhammad Hanif; 5 March 1958) is an Indian actor, director, producer, voice artist, singer and politician who mainly works in the Tamil, Telugu and Malayalam film industries. He has also worked in a few Kannada, English, Hindi and Bengali films. He is the incumbent president of the Nadigar Sangam, a trade union for film, television, and stage actors in Tamil Nadu.

== Early life and education ==
Nassar was born as Muhammad Hanif on March 5, 1958, into a Tamil Muslim family in Palur, Tamil Nadu, India. His parents were Mehaboob Basha and Mumtaz. He studied in St. Joseph's Higher Secondary School, Chengalpattu. He moved to Madras (now Chennai) after school, where he finished his pre-university at Madras Christian College. At Madras Christian College, he was an active member of the Dramatic Society. Later for a brief time, he worked in the Indian Air Force. He trained in two acting schools: the South Indian Film Chamber of Commerce's Film Institute and the Tamil Nadu Institute for Film and Television Technology.

== Career ==
Nassar made his acting debut in K. Balachander's Kalyana Agathigal (1985) portraying a secondary supporting role, before moving on to play villainous roles in S. P. Muthuraman's Velaikaran (1987) and Vanna Kanavugal (1987). He played the protagonist in Yuhi Sethu's Kavithai Paada Neramillai (1987), though his breakthrough role came through his performance as a police officer in Mani Ratnam's Nayakan (1987). He subsequently became a regular in Mani Ratnam and Kamal Haasan's ventures, appearing in pivotal character roles in Roja (1992), Thevar Magan (1992), Bombay (1995), Kuruthipunal (1995), Chachi 420 (1997) and Iruvar (1997).

Nassar made his directorial debut with Avatharam (1995), a film based on the backdrop of a folk art troupe. Starring Revathi as his co-star, Nassar stated that the idea had come to him as a result of his childhood memories of watching theru koothu being performed on the streets alongside his father. The film won critical acclaim, but failed to become a commercially successful venture. Soon afterwards, he made Devathai (1997), stating he remembered a story he had first heard as a child, which became the "creative seed for this film" about reincarnation. He stated that his immediate busy schedule had subsequently cost him a role in Aamir Khan's Lagaan (2001). He subsequently continued to work in films in the late 1990s, portraying a blind musician in Rajiv Menon's Minsara Kanavu (1997), a political leader in Mani Ratnam's Iruvar (1997) and as the father of a pair of separated twins in S. Shankar's Jeans (1998).

In Malayalam cinema, he is noted for his roles alongside Mohanlal in films like Mukham (1990), Butterflies (1993) and Olympian Anthony Adam (1999). Some of the films that he has acted in Telugu include Chanti (1992), Bhageeratha (2005), Athadu (2005), Pokiri (2006), Golimaar (2010), Shakthi (2011), Dookudu (2011), Businessman (2012) and among others.

Besides South Indian language films, he has acted in Hindi language films like Chachi 420 (1997), Phir Milenge (2004), Nishabd (2007), Rowdy Rathore (2012), Saala Khadoos (2016) and Serious Men (2020) among others.

He played Bijjaladeva, a pivotal role in the films Baahubali: The Beginning (2015) and Baahubali 2: The Conclusion (2017).

He was seen as the mysterious antagonist in Ponniyin Selvan: I (2022) and Ponniyin Selvan: II (2023). He plays a two-faced character in the Hindi web series The Jengaburu Curse (2023).

== Personal life ==
Nassar is married to psychologist and producer turned politician Kameela and they have three sons. The eldest, Abdul Asan Faizal, was initially reported to be making his acting debut in a film to be produced by T. Siva, but eventually did not do so. In 2014, he was involved in a serious road accident but recovered after being critically injured. Their second son, Luthfudeen, made his acting debut in A. L. Vijay's Saivam (2014) portraying the grandson of the character played by Nassar. Their third son Abi Hassan is also an actor and featured in Nassar's Sun Sun Thatha (2012) as well as Rajesh Selva's 2019 action thriller Kadaram Kondan.

== Awards ==
- Kalaimamani Award - 1998
