= Kanchana (film series) =

Indian film series

- Logo
- Created by: Raghava Lawrence
- Original work: Muni (2007)
- Owners: Gemini Productions; Raghavendra Productions; Sun Pictures; Goldmines Telefilms
- Years: 2007–present

Films and television
- Film(s): Muni (2007); Kanchana (2011); Kanchana 2 (2015); Kanchana 3 (2019); Kanchana 4 (2027)

Miscellaneous
- Budget: est. ₹49 crore (4 films)
- Box office: est. ₹313 crore (4 films) (See more details)

Kanchana also known as Muni, is an Indian Tamil-language horror masala film series created and directed by Raghava Lawrence, consisting of Muni (2007), Kanchana (2011), Kanchana 2 (2015) and Kanchana 3 (2019). Kanchana 4 is in production. All films were successful at the box office and is currently the third highest grossing Tamil film franchise.

Kanchana was remade in Kannada as Kalpana (2012). In 2016 the Sri Lankan remake Maya was released. It was unofficially remade in Burmese as Tar Tay Gyi (2017). In 2017, the Bengali language remake was released, titled Mayabini. Lawrence himself directed the Hindi remake titled Laxmii (2020). Kanchana 2 was remade in Kannada as Kalpana 2 (2016).

== Films ==
Key
†	Denotes films that have not yet been released

Film	Release date	Director	Cast	Producer(s)	Installment(s)	Note(s)
Muni	9 March 2007	Raghava Lawrence	Raghava Lawrence, Rajkiran, Vedika	Saran	First Installment	Kanchana (film series)
Kanchana	22 July 2011	Raghava Lawrence	Raghava Lawrence, R. Sarathkumar, Lakshmi Rai	Raghava Lawrence	Second Installment	Kanchana (film series)
Kanchana 2	17 April 2015	Raghava Lawrence	Raghava Lawrence, Taapsee Pannu, Nithya Menen	Raghava Lawrence	Third Installment	Kanchana (film series)
Kanchana 3	19 April 2019	Raghava Lawrence	Raghava Lawrence, Oviya, Vedika, Nikki Tamboli	Kalanithi Maran, Raghava Lawrence	Fourth Installment	Kanchana (film series)
Kanchana 4 †	2027	Raghava Lawrence	Raghava Lawrence, Pooja Hegde, Nora Fatehi	Manish Shah	Fifth and Final Installment	Kanchana (film series)

=== Muni (2007) ===
The first installment of the series, based on fictional incidents. A young man, along with his wife and his parents, migrates to Chennai where he gets possessed by the spirit of a kind-hearted person who was murdered by an ambitious and corrupt political leader. Muni was released on 9 March 2007 and gained positive response. It earned ₹15 crore against a budget of ₹4 crore.

=== Kanchana (2011) ===
After the success of Muni Raghava and Sarala Re-unite once again for sequel. The film was titled as Kanchana and also second installment in this series. The film was released on 22 July 2011 worldwide. The film's soundtrack was composed by S. Thaman. Kanchana opened to mostly positive reviews. The film grossed ₹60 crore worldwide becoming the fifth highest grossing Tamil film of 2011.

=== Kanchana 2 (2015) ===
A stand-alone sequel, Kanchana 2, was commissioned after the success of the previous films and was also directed by Raghava. It stars Raghava Lawrence, Taapsee Pannu and Kovai Sarala in lead roles. And also the third installment in this series. It was released on 17 April 2015 in around 750 screens worldwide alongside Mani Ratnam's O Kadhal Kanmani. The Telugu version titled Ganga was released later on 1 May 2015 in around 550 screens. Film received positive response from audience. Proving to be similarly successful to the first entry in the series, the film emerged as a huge box office success, becoming the third highest grossing Tamil film of 2015.

=== Kanchana 3 (2019) ===
The fourth installment in this series, written and directed by Raghava. The film was titled as Naga, then changed to Kanchana 3, produced by Sun Pictures. The film stars Raghava in a dual role with Oviya, Vedhika, Nikki Tamboli, Ri Djavi Alexandra. While Kovai Sarala, Soori, Tarun Arora, and Kabir Duhan Singh play supporting roles. Kanchana 3 was released on Good Friday in 2019. The film received mixed reviews from audiences, comparisons of Kanchana 1 and 2. It earned ₹130 crore worldwide against a budget of ₹20 crore, becoming one of the fourth highest grossing Tamil film of 2019.

=== Kanchana 4 (2027) ===
The fifth and final installment in this series, written and directed by Raghava, and stars Pooja Hegde and Nora Fatehi in the lead roles is in production. The film was officially announced in April 2019, coinciding with the theatrical success of Kanchana 3. Production was reportedly set to begin in 2020, but was delayed due to the COVID-19 pandemic and Lawrence's acting commitments. Principal photography commenced on 23 January 2025 in Chennai and is produced by Goldmines Telefilms.

== Recurring cast and characters ==
List indicator

- This table lists the main characters who appear in the film series.
- An empty dark grey cell indicates that the character was not in the film, or that the character's presence in the film has yet to be announced.

Actors	Films				
Actors	Muni	Kanchana	Kanchana 2	Kanchana 3	Kanchana 4
Year	2007	2011	2015	2019	2027
Introduced in Muni
Raghava Lawrence	Ganesh	Raghava	Raghava & Shiva (Dual role)	Raghava & Kaali (Dual role)	Raghava
Kovai Sarala	Sarala	Sarala	Sarala	Sarala	Sarala
Vedhika	Priya			Priya	
Introduced in Kanchana
Raai Laxmi		Priya			
Sriman		Prasad	Prasad	Prasad	Prasad
Devadarshini		Kamakshi		Kamakshi	Kamakshi
Introduced in Kanchana 2
Taapsee Pannu			Nandini		
Nithya Menen			Ganga		
Introduced in Kanchana 3
Oviya				Kavya	
Nikki Tamboli				Divya	
Introduced in Kanchana 4
Pooja Hegde					TBA
Nora Fatehi					TBA

== Crew ==
Occupation	Film				
Occupation	Muni	Muni 2: Kanchana	Kanchana 2	Kanchana 3	Kanchana 4
Occupation	2007	2011	2015	2019	2027
Producer(s)	Saran	Raghava Lawrence	Raghava Lawrence	Kalanithi Maran; Raghava Lawrence	Raghava Lawrence
Director	Raghava Lawrence	Raghava Lawrence	Raghava Lawrence	Raghava Lawrence	Raghava Lawrence
Story writer	Raghava Lawrence	Raghava Lawrence	Raghava Lawrence	Raghava Lawrence	Raghava Lawrence
Screenplay writer	Raghava Lawrence	Raghava Lawrence	Raghava Lawrence	Raghava Lawrence	Raghava Lawrence
Dialogue writer	Ramesh Khanna	Raghava Lawrence	Raghava Lawrence	Raghava Lawrence	Raghava Lawrence
Song composer(s)	Bharadwaj	S. Thaman	S. Thaman; C. Sathya; Aswamithra; Leon James	Doo Paa Doo	TBA
Background Score	Sangeetharajan	S. Thaman	S. Thaman	S. Thaman	TBA
Director of photography	K. V. Guhan	Vetri; E. Krishnasamy	Rajavel Oliveeran; R. B. Gurudev	Vetri; Sarvesh Murari	TBA
Editor(s)	Suresh Urs	Kishore Te.	Kishore Te.	Ruben	TBA
Art Director(s)	Mohana Mahendran	Jana	Jana	Jana	TBA
Stunt co-ordinator	Super Subbarayan	Super Subbarayan	Super Subbarayan	Super Subbarayan	TBA
Production companies	Gemini Productions	Raghavendra Productions; Sri Thenandal Films	Raghavendra Productions	Raghavendra Productions; Sun Pictures	Goldmines Telefilms
Distributing company	Gemini Productions; Sri Thenandal Films	Sun Pictures	Sun Pictures; Wellborn International (Kerala)	Sun Pictures	TBA
Running time	153 minutes	170 minutes	164 minutes	166 minutes	TBA

== Release and revenue ==
=== Box office ===
Film	Release date	Budget	Box office revenue	Ref.
Muni	9 March 2007	₹4 crore (US$967,386.97)	₹15 crore (US$3.63 million)	
Kanchana	22 July 2011	₹7 crore (US$1.5 million)	₹60 crore (US$12.86 million)	
Kanchana 2	17 April 2015	₹18 crore (US$2.81 million)	₹108 crore (US$16.84 million)	
Kanchana 3	19 April 2019	₹20 crore (US$2.84 million)	₹130 crore (US$18.46 million)	
Total		₹49 crore (US$5.1 million)	₹313 crore (US$33 million)	

== Remakes ==
Year	Film	Language	Cast	Notes	Ref.
2012	Kalpana	Kannada	Upendra, Raai Laxmi, Saikumar, Babu Antony	Remake of Kanchana	
2016	Maya	Sinhalese	Ranjan Ramanayake, Pubudu Chathuranga, Giriraj Kaushalya, Nilmini Kottegoda and Upeksha Swarnamali	Remake of Kanchana	
2017	Tar Tay Gyi	Burmese	Nay Toe and Shwe Thamee	Remake of Kanchana	
2017	Mayabini	Bengali Bangladesh	Symon Sadik, Airin Sultana, Amit Hasan	Remake of Kanchana	
2020	Laxmii	Hindi	Akshay Kumar, Kiara Advani, Ayesha Raza Mishra, Rajesh Sharma, Ashwini Kalsekar and Sharad Kelkar	Remake of Kanchana	
2016	Kalpana 2	Kannada	Upendra, Priyamani and Avantika Shetty	Remake of Kanchana 2	

== Legacy ==
Along with Chandramukhi (2005), Muni became a trendsetter for horror comedy films. The success of the film inspired several other horror comedy films including the Aranmanai film series (2014) and Darling (2015).
