= Goldmines Telefilms =

Indian film production company and YouTube channel

- Logo of Goldmines
- Industry: Entertainment
- Founded: 5 January 2000 (26 years ago)
- Founder: Manish Shah
- Key people: Manish Shah (chairman); Ulka Shah
- Products: Film production; Film distribution; Television production; Streaming television; Marketing; Post-Production

YouTube information
- Channel: Goldmines
- Years active: January 21, 2012 – present
- Genre: Entertainment
- Subscribers: 111 million
- Views: 33.6 billion
- Last updated: 6 Nov 2026
- Website: goldmines.co.in

Goldmines Telefilms Pvt. Ltd. is an Indian film distribution and production company based in Mumbai, Maharashtra. Founded in 2000 by producer Manish Shah, the company is best known for acquiring and dubbing South Indian films—primarily in Tamil and Telugu—into Hindi, Bhojpuri and Bengali for distribution across television, satellite channels, and digital platforms such as Youtube.

== History ==
=== Early years and television production (2000–2006) ===
Goldmines Telefilms is a film production and distribution company established on 5 January 2000. The company began operations in 2004. Initially, the company focused on producing regional-language television soaps in Gujarati and Marathi for channels like Alpha Marathi, ETV Gujarati, and Hungama TV. During this period, Goldmines also entered the film syndication market, acquiring rights to older Hindi films and licensing them to broadcasters, setting the stage for its later specialization in content distribution.

=== Entry into film dubbing (2007–2012) ===
In 2007, under the leadership of founder Manish Shah, Goldmines pivoted to dubbing South Indian films into Hindi, capitalizing on a gap in the Hindi entertainment market for mass-oriented, action-packed cinema. The company’s first dubbed project, the Telugu film Mass (2004), was released as Meri Jung: One Man Army in 2007 and achieved TRPs exceeding 1 on Sony Max, proving the viability of dubbed content. Goldmines rapidly expanded its library, acquiring rights to Tamil and Telugu blockbusters featuring stars like Rajinikanth, Chiranjeevi, Nagarjuna, and later Allu Arjun and Jr. NTR. Films such as Chirutha (2007), King (2008) and Magadheera (2009) became television hits, positioning Goldmines as a leader in dubbed cinema within four years.

=== Digital expansion and channel launch (2013–2020) ===
The rise of digital platforms in the 2010s prompted Goldmines Telefilms to expand beyond traditional television. In 2013, the company launched its YouTube channel, "Goldmines", to distribute Hindi-dubbed films directly to viewers. This move proved prescient as internet penetration grew across India, particularly in Tier 2 and Tier 3 cities where South Indian dubbed films found a massive audience. By 2020, the channel had grown exponentially, boasting millions of subscribers and becoming a key revenue stream. In 2020, Goldmines further diversified by launching Dhinchaak TV, a free-to-air channel on the DD Free Dish platform. Aimed at rural and semi-urban Hindi-speaking viewers, Dhinchaak TV quickly became the top-rated channel in its genre, broadcasting a steady stream of dubbed South Indian films. This period also saw Goldmines dabbling in film production, with titles like Thuppakki (2012), Mirchi (2013), Sarrainodu (2016), DJ: Duvvada Jagannadham (2017) and Maharshi (2019), though distribution remained its core strength.

=== Mainstream success and film productions (2021–Present) ===
In 2021, Goldmines distributed Hindi version of Pushpa: The Rise and became a huge success. In 2022, Goldmines decided to release dubbed version of Ala Vaikunthapurramuloo in theatres. Instead, they exclusively on their TV channel.

In 2024, Goldmines Telefilms signed to produce Kanchana 4. Announced as a pan-Indian film, Kanchana 4 marks a return to production for the company following the success of Pushpa: The Rise. Shooting began in January 2025. The film is slated for a theatrical release in 2026, with plans for an digital release after an eight-week window, aligning with national multiplex chain requirements.

== Filmography ==
Key
†	Denotes films that have not yet been released

=== Films produced ===
Year	Film	Director	Cast	Language	Notes	Ref
TBA	Kanchana 4 †	Raghava Lawrence	Raghava Lawrence, Pooja Hegde	Tamil	Filming	
TBA	My Dear Sister †	Prabhu Jeyaram	Arulnithi, Mamta Mohandas	Tamil	Filming	

=== Films distributed ===
Film rights acquired by Goldmines Telefilms, later dubbed and released

Original title	Title of Hindi dubbed version	Original language	Original year release	Dub year release	Cast	Notes
Mass	Meri Jung: One Man Army	Telugu	2004	2007	Akkineni Nagarjuna, Jyothika, Charmme Kaur, Raghuvaran, Rahul Dev, Sunil	Also Dubbed in Bhojpuri as Rowdy Ganesh (2023)
Ranam	Surya Jalta Nahin Jalata Hai	Telugu	2006	2007	T. Gopichand, Kamna Jethmalani, Biju Menon	
Jagadam	Dangerous Khiladi Returns	Telugu	2007	Unknown	Ram Pothineni, Isha Sahani, Pradeep Rawat, Prakash Raj	
Kerala Varma Pazhassi Raja	Pazhassi Raja	Malayalam	2009		Mammootty, Manoj K. Jayan, R. Sarathkumar, Kanika Subramaniam, Padmapriya, Suman Talwar	
King	King No. 1	Telugu	2008	2010	Akkineni Nagarjuna, Trisha Krishnan, Mamta Mohandas, Srihari	
Parugu	Veerta: The Power	Telugu	2008	2010	Allu Arjun, Sheela Kaur, Prakash Raj	Also Dubbed in Bhojpuri as Arjun Ek Deewana (2022)
Simha		Telugu	2010	2011	Nandamuri Balakrishna, Nayanthara, Sneha Ullal, Namitha	Released theatrically in Hindi as Zakhmi Sher.
Seetharama Raju	Ek Aur Haqiqat	Telugu	1999	2011	Nandamuri Harikrishna, Akkineni Nagarjuna, Sakshi Shivanand, Sanghavi	Also Dubbed in Bhojpuri as Hamar Samrajya (2011)
Hero	Ladenge Hum Marte Dum Tak	Telugu	2008	2011	Nithiin, Bhavana, Ramya Krishnan	Also Dubbed in Bhojpuri as Ladab Hum Aakhri Saans Tak (2013)
Kedi	Gambler No. 1	Telugu	2010	2011	Akkineni Nagarjuna, Mamta Mohandas	
Varudu	Ek Aur Rakshak	Telugu	2010	2011	Allu Arjun, Arya, Bhanu Sri Mehra	
Rama Rama Krishna Krishna	Nafrat Ki Jung	Telugu	2010	2011	Ram Pothineni, Arjun Sarja, Priya Anand, Bindu Madhavi	Also Dubbed in Bhojpuri as Deva Ki Jung (2022)
Katha Screenplay Darsakatvam Appalaraju	Sabse Bada Loafer	Telugu	2011	Unknown	Sunil, Swathi Reddy, Brahmanandam	
Brindavanam	The Super Khiladi	Telugu	2010	2012	N. T. Rama Rao Jr., Kajal Aggarwal, Samantha Ruth Prabhu, Prakash Raj, Srihari	Also Dubbed in Bhojpuri as Jabazz Jigarwala (2012)
Samanyudu	Mission To Finish Corruption	Telugu	2006	2012	Jagapathi Babu, Kamna Jethmalani	
Singam	The Fighterman Singham	Tamil	2010	2012	Suriya, Anushka Shetty, Prakash Raj	
Narasimha Naidu	Sabse Bada Jungbaaz	Telugu	2001	2012	Nandamuri Balakrishna, Preeti Jhangiani, Simran Bagga, Asha Saini	
Ee Pattanathil Bhootham	Hamara Dost Bhoot Uncle	Malayalam	2009	2012	Mammootty, Innocent, Kavya Madhavan, Suraj Venjaramoodu	
Oosaravelli	Mar Mitenge	Telugu	2011	2012	N. T. Rama Rao Jr., Tamannaah Bhatia, Prakash Raj, Payal Ghosh	Also Dubbed in Bhojpuri as Oosaravelli (2021)
Khatarnak	Main Hoon Khatarnak	Telugu	2006	2012	Ravi Teja, Ileana D'Cruz, Biju Menon, Prakash Raj	
Gaganam	Mere Hindustan Ki Kasam	Telugu	2011	2012	Akkineni Nagarjuna, Poonam Kaur, Prakash Raj, Sana Khan	Also Dubbed in Bhojpuri as Desh Ka Rakhwala (2019)
Anjani Putrudu	Mera Dost Hanuman	Telugu	2009	2012	Nagendra Babu, Ramya Krishnan, Prema, M. S. Narayana	
Sakthi	Ek Tha Soldier	Telugu	2011	2012	N. T. Rama Rao Jr., Ileana D'Cruz, Pooja Bedi, Jackie Shroff, Prabhu	Also Dubbed in Bhojpuri as Hamaar Shoorveer (2014)
Porki	Main Hoon Wanted	Kannada	2010	2012	Darshan, Pranitha Subhash, Ashish Vidyarthi	Remake of Telugu film Pokiri (2006) and also dubbed in Bhojpuri as Hamaar Bhai Dabangg (2012)
Gabbar Singh	Policewala Gunda	Telugu	2012	2013	Pawan Kalyan, Shruti Haasan, Abhimanyu Singh	Remake of Hindi film Dabangg (2010). Also Dubbed in Bhojpuri as Daroga Raja (2020)
Mogudu	Mard Ki Zaban	Telugu	2011	2013	T. Gopichand, Taapsee Pannu, Shraddha Das	
Dongaata	Main Hoon Tapori	Telugu	1997	2013	Jagapathi Babu, Soundarya	
Shock	Mera Insaaf	Telugu	2006	2013	Ravi Teja, Jyothika	Also Dubbed in Bhojpuri as Zulam Ko Mita Deb (2013)
Athadu	Cheetah: The Power of One	Telugu	2005	2013	Mahesh Babu, Trisha Krishnan, Sonu Sood, Prakash Raj	
Chirutha		Telugu	2007	2013	Ram Charan, Neha Sharma, Prakash Raj, Ashish Vidyarthi	
Saleem	The Fighterman Saleem	Telugu	2009	2013	Vishnu Manchu, Ileana D'Cruz, Mohan Babu	
Intlo Illalu Vantintlo Priyuralu	Ghar Mein Ram Gali Mein Shyam	Telugu	1996	2013	Daggubati Venkatesh, Soundarya, Vineetha	
Kotha Bangaru Lokam	Pavitra Bandhan	Telugu	2008	2013	Varun Sandesh, Shweta Basu Prasad	
Bunny	Bunny: The Hero	Telugu	2005	2013	Allu Arjun, Gowri Munjal, Prakash Raj, R. Sarathkumar, Mukesh Rishi	Also Dubbed in Bhojpuri as Rajkumar (2013)
Darling	Sabse Badhkar Hum	Telugu	2010	2013	Prabhas, Kajal Aggarwal, Prabhu	Also Dubbed in Bhojpuri as Hamara Aage Kehu Na (2016)
Raam	Aaj Ka Naya Ready	Kannada	2009	2013	Puneeth Rajkumar, Priyamani	Also Dubbed in Bhojpuri as Ee Kaisan Khel Ba (2013)
Daruvu	Jeene Nahi Doonga	Telugu	2012	2013	Ravi Teja, Taapsee Pannu, Sushant Singh, Prabhu	
Broker	Jugaadu No. 1	Telugu	2010	2013	Srihari, R. P. Patnaik, Asha Saini, Kota Srinivasa Rao	
Dhammu		Telugu	2012	2013	N. T. Rama Rao Jr., Trisha Krishnan, Karthika Nair	
Nippu	Main Insaaf Karoonga	Telugu	2012	2013	Ravi Teja, Deeksha Seth, Srikanth, Pradeep Rawat	
Samarasimha Reddy	Rakhwala One Man Army	Telugu	1999	2013	Nandamuri Balakrishna, Simran Bagga	Also Dubbed in Bhojpuri as Hum Banal Rakhwala (2016)
Jai	Ladakhoo	Telugu	2004	2013	Navdeep, Santhoshi, Ayesha Jhulka, Salim Baig	Also Dubbed in as Bhojpuri as Ladakhoo (2013)
Dhee	Sabse Badi Hera Pheri	Telugu	2007	2013	Vishnu Manchu, Genelia D'Souza, Srihari	Remade in Tamil as Mirattal (2011) Also Dubbed in Bhojpuri as Jo Humse Takarie Chur Chur Ho Jai (2013)
Dhada		Telugu	2011	2013	Naga Chaitanya, Kajal Aggarwal	Also Dubbed in Bhojpuri as Jwalamukhi (2022)
Mr. Perfect	No. 1 Mr. Perfect	Telugu	2011	2013	Prabhas, Kajal Aggarwal, Taapsee Pannu	Also Dubbed in Bhojpuri as Vilayati Aashiq (2022)
Julayi	Dangerous Khiladi	Telugu	2012	2013	Allu Arjun, Ileana D'Cruz, Sonu Sood, Rajendra Prasad	Remade in Tamil as Saagasam (2016).
Kaavalan	Main Hoon Bodyguard	Tamil	2011	2013	Vijay, Asin, Vadivelu, Mithra Kurien	Remake of Malayalam film Body Guard (2010). Also Dubbed in Bhojpuri as Hamaar Angrakshak (2013)
Bejawada	Hero: The Action Man	Telugu	2011	2013	Naga Chaitanya, Amala Paul, Prabhu	Also Dubbed in Bhojpuri as The Fighterman Shiva (2023)
Magadheera		Telugu	2009	2013	Ram Charan, Kajal Aggarwal, Srihari, Dev Gill	Also Dubbed in Bhojpuri as Joshila Yoddha (2019)
Ainthu Ainthu Ainthu	Paanch Ka Punch	Tamil	2013	2013	Bharath, Chandini Sreedharan, Erica Fernandes	
Krishna	Krishna: The Power on Earth	Telugu	2008	2013	Ravi Teja, Trisha Krishnan, Mukul Dev	
Virodhi	Apradh Ke Aatank	Telugu	2011	2013	Srikanth, Kamalinee Mukherjee, Ajay, Kamal Kamaraju	
Vaastav: The Reality		Hindi	1999	2013	Sanjay Dutt, Namrata Shirodkar, Ashish Vidyarthi	Also Dubbed in Bhojpuri as Tohar Ko Thok Debe (2013)
Baadshah	Rowdy Baadshah	Telugu	2013	2014	N. T. Rama Rao Jr., Kajal Aggarwal, Ashish Vidyarthi, Kelly Dorji	
Iddarammayilatho	Dangerous Khiladi 2	Telugu	2013	2014	Allu Arjun, Amala Paul, Catherine Tresa	
Chakram		Telugu	2005	2014	Prabhas, Asin, Charmme Kaur	
Racha	Betting Raja	Telugu	2012	2014	Ram Charan, Tamannaah Bhatia	Also Dubbed in Bhojpuri as Risky Aashiq (2022)
Sreeram	Ghera Ghaav	Telugu	2002	2014	Uday Kiran, Anita Hassanandani Reddy, Ashish Vidyarthi	Remake of Tamil film Dhill (2001).
Seema Sastri	Guru Mahaguru	Telugu	2007	2014	Allari Naresh, Farjana, Ali, Krishna Bhagavaan, M. S. Narayana	
Vettam	The Real De Dana Dan	Malayalam	2004	2014	Dileep, Bhavna Pani	The comedy scenes of this movie were later adapted by the director Priyadarshan for his 2009 Hindi movie De Dana Dan. Also Dubbed in Bhojpuri as Hamar Badla (2014)
Adhinayakudu	The Action Man Adhinayakudu	Telugu	2012	2014	Nandamuri Balakrishna, Raai Laxmi	
Balupu	Jani Dushman	Telugu	2013	2014	Ravi Teja, Shruti Haasan, Anjali, Prakash Raj, Ashutosh Rana	
Sahasam	The Real Jackpot	Telugu	2013	2014	T. Gopichand, Taapsee Pannu	
Pilla Zamindar	Daan Veer	Telugu	2011	2014	Nani, Haripriya, Bindu Madhavi	
Ammayi Kosam	Ladai Taqdeer Ki	Telugu	2001	2014	Ravi Teja, Meena	
Body Guard	Shaktimaan	Malayalam	2010	2014	Dileep, Nayanthara, Mithra Kurien, Thiyagarajan	Remade in Tamil as Kaavalan (2011), in Telugu as Bodyguard (2012) and in Hindi as Bodyguard (2011).
All the Best	Risk	Telugu	2012	2014	J.D. Chakravarthy, Srikanth	
Dongodu	Chalu No. 1	Telugu	2003	2014	Ravi Teja, Kalyani	Also Dubbed in Bhojpuri as Chorva Pe Manva Dole (2014)
Takkari Donga	Choron Ka Chor	Telugu	2002	2014	Mahesh Babu, Bipasha Basu, Lisa Ray	Also Dubbed in Bhojpuri as Choron Ka Raja (2014)
Devudu Chesina Manushulu	Dadagiri	Telugu	2012	2014	Ravi Teja, Ileana D'Cruz, Prakash Raj, Brahmanandam, Kovai Sarala	
Classmates	Sabse Bada Khel	Telugu	2007	2014	Sumanth, Ravi Varma, Sharwanand, Sadha, Kamalinee Mukherjee	
Mr. Nookayya	Mr. Mobile	Telugu	2012	2014	Manoj Manchu, Kriti Kharbanda, Sana Khan	
Singam Puli	Do Ka Tadka	Tamil	2011	2014	Jiiva, Ramya, Honey Rose	
Madatha Kaja	Mera Pyar	Telugu	2011	2014	Allari Naresh, Sneha Ullal	
Gangotri		Telugu	2003	2014	Allu Arjun, Aditi Agarwal, Prakash Raj, Suman Talwar	
Vettaikaaran	Dangerous Khiladi 3	Tamil	2009	2014	Vijay, Anushka Shetty, Srihari, Salim Ghouse, Sayaji Shinde, P. Ravi Shankar	Also Dubbed in Bhojpuri as Khiladi Ka Challenge (2019)
Krishnam Vande Jagadgurum	Krishna Ka Badla	Telugu	2012	2014	Rana Daggubati, Nayanthara	
Alex Pandian		Tamil	2013	2014	Karthi, Anushka Shetty, N. Santhanam	
Pavitra Bandham	Anokha Bandhan	Telugu	1996	2014	Daggubati Venkatesh, Soundarya, S.P. Balasubrahmanyam	Remade in Tamil as Priyamaanavale (2000) and in Hindi as Hum Aapke Dil Mein Rehte Hain (1999). Also Dubbed in Bhojpuri as Ho Zayeb Kurban Tohar Khatir (2014)
Padikkadavan	Meri Taqat Mera Faisla 2	Tamil	2009	2014	Dhanush, Tamannaah Bhatia, Suman Talwar, Atul Kulkarni	
Naayak	Double Attack	Telugu	2013	2014	Ram Charan, Kajal Aggarwal, Amala Paul	
Rebel	The Return of Rebel	Telugu	2012	2014	Prabhas, Tamannaah Bhatia, Deeksha Seth, Krishnam Raju	Also Dubbed in Bhojpuri as Baaghi Saiyaan (2019)
Maattrraan	No. 1 Judwaa - The Unbreakable	Tamil	2012	2014	Suriya, Kajal Aggarwal, Sachin Khedekar, Tara	
Greeku Veerudu	America V/s India	Telugu	2013	2014	Akkineni Nagarjuna, Nayanthara	Also Dubbed in Bhojpuri as Pardesi Balmaa (2014)
Kabaddi Kabaddi	Pyar Ki Ladai	Telugu	2003	2014	Jagapathi Babu, Kalyani	
Chukkallo Chandrudu	Pyar Ka Ehsaas	Telugu	2006	2014	Akkineni Nageswara Rao, Waheeda Rahman, Siddharth Narayan, Sadha, Charmme Kaur, Saloni Aswani	
Jilla	Policewala Gunda 2	Tamil	2014	2014	Vijay, Mohanlal, Kajal Aggarwal	
Vedam	Antim Faisla	Telugu	2010	2014	Allu Arjun, Anushka Shetty, Manoj Manchu, Manoj Bajpayee, Nagayya, Deeksha Seth	Remade in Tamil as Vaanam (2011).
Muni 2: Kanchana	Kanchana	Tamil	2011	2014	Raghava Lawrence, Raai Laxmi, R. Sarathkumar	
Veta	Badle Ki Aag	Telugu	2014	2014	Srikanth, Tarun Kumar, Madhuurima, Jasmin Bhasin	
Vandae Maatharam	Mission Vande Mataram	Malayalam; Tamil	2010	2014	Mammootty, Arjun Sarja, Sneha	
Key	Khatron Ka Khel	Telugu	2011	2014	Jagapathi Babu	
Kandireega	Dangerous Khiladi 4	Telugu	2011	2015	Ram Pothineni, Hansika Motwani, Sonu Sood, Aksha Pardasany	
Yevadu		Telugu	2014	2015	Ram Charan, Allu Arjun, Shruti Haasan, Kajal Aggarwal, Amy Jackson	Also Dubbed in Bhojpuri as Satya Ka Badla (2019)
Happy	Dum	Telugu	2006	2015	Allu Arjun, Genelia D'Souza, Manoj Bajpayee	Also Dubbed in Bhojpuri as Dumdaar Aashiq (2022)
Srimannarayana	The Return of Lion	Telugu	2012	2015	Nandamuri Balakrishna, Parvati Melton, Isha Chawla	
Maaro	Maroo	Telugu	2011	2015	Nithiin, Meera Chopra, Abbas	
Thirumalai	Dum 2	Tamil	2003	2015	Vijay, Jyothika, Vivek, Raghuvaran	Remade in Telugu as Gowri (2004).
Murari	Rowdy Cheetah	Telugu	2001	2015	Mahesh Babu, Sonali Bendre	Also Dubbed in Bhojpuri as Krishan Kanhaiya (2015)
Dum	Meri Himmat	Tamil	2003	2015	Silambarasan, Rakshita, Ashish Vidyarthi	Remake of Kannada film Appu (2002).
Saamy	Policewala Gunda 3	Tamil	2003	2015	Vikram, Trisha Krishnan, Kota Srinivasa Rao, Vivek, Ramesh Khanna	Remade in Telugu as Lakshmi Narasimha (2004).
Neti Siddhartha	Shankh	Telugu	1990	2015	Krishnam Raju, Akkineni Nagarjuna, Shobana, Ayesha Jhulka	
Thuppakki	Indian Soldier: Never On Holiday	Tamil	2012	2015	Vijay, Kajal Aggarwal, Vidyut Jammwal	
Uu Kodathara? Ulikki Padathara?	Simha 2	Telugu	2012	2015	Nandamuri Balakrishna, Manoj Manchu, Sonu Sood	
Mirchi	Khatarnak Khiladi	Telugu	2013	2015	Prabhas, Anushka Shetty, Richa Gangopadhyay	Released theatrically as Khatarnak Khiladi as Mirchi. Remade in Kannada as Maanikya (2014). Also Dubbed in Bhojpuri as Khatarnak Bhai (2019)
Thiruvilaiyaadal Aarambam	Super Khiladi Returns	Tamil	2006	2015	Dhanush, Shriya Saran, Prakash Raj	Remade in Telugu as Takkari (2007). Also Dubbed in Bhojpuri as Khel Khiladi Bhaiya Ke (2015)
Denikaina Ready	Sabse Badi Hera Pheri 2	Telugu	2012	2015	Vishnu Manchu, Hansika Motwani, Prabhu, Suman Talwar, Brahmanandam	Also Dubbed in Bhojpuri as Sabse Bada Gadbad Ghotala (2015)
Loukyam	Ek Khiladi	Telugu	2014	2015	T. Gopichand, Rakul Preet Singh	Previously uploaded on YouTube as Zabardast Dilwala. Remade in Tamil as Sakka Podu Podu Raja (2017).
Mappillai	Jamai Raja	Tamil	2011	2015	Dhanush, Hansika Motwani, Manisha Koirala	
Ramayya Vasthavayya	Mar Mitenge 2	Telugu	2013	2015	N. T. Rama Rao Jr., Shruti Haasan, Samantha Ruth Prabhu	
Priyamaanavale	Dil Ki Baat	Tamil	2000	2015	Vijay, Simran Bagga, S.P. Balasubrahmanyam, Vivek	Remake of Telugu film Pavitra Bandham (1996).
Chandee	Chandi: The Power of Woman	Telugu	2013	2015	Priyamani, R. Sarathkumar, Krishnam Raju	
Ramanaa	Mar Mitenge 3	Tamil	2002	2015	Vijayakanth, Simran Bagga, Ashima Bhalla	Remade in Telugu as Tagore (2003) and in Hindi as Gabbar Is Back (2015).
Seethamma Vakitlo Sirimalle Chettu	Sabse Badhkar Hum 2	Telugu	2013	2015	Daggubati Venkatesh, Mahesh Babu, Anjali, Samantha Ruth Prabhu	
Yodha	Ek Hi Maqsad	Kannada	2009	2016	Darshan, Nikita Thukral, Ashish Vidyarthi	
Heart Attack		Telugu	2014	2016	Nithiin, Adah Sharma, Vikramjeet Virk	
Kutty	Daringbaaz Aashiq	Tamil	2010	2016	Dhanush, Shriya Saran, Sameer Dattani	Remake of Telugu film Arya (2004).
Cameraman Gangatho Rambabu	Mera Target	Telugu	2012	2016	Pawan Kalyan, Tamannaah Bhatia, Prakash Raj	
Yennai Arindhaal	Satyadev: The Fearless Cop	Tamil	2015	2016	Ajith Kumar, Trisha Krishnan, Anushka Shetty, Arun Vijay	
Rabhasa	The Super Khiladi 2	Telugu	2014	2016	N. T. Rama Rao Jr., Samantha Ruth Prabhu, Pranitha Subhash	
Pattathu Yaanai	Daringbaaz Khiladi	Tamil	2013	2016	Vishal, Aishwarya Arjun, N. Santhanam	
S/O Satyamurthy	Son of Satyamurthy	Telugu	2015	2016	Allu Arjun, Upendra, Samantha Ruth Prabhu, Nithya Menen, Sneha, Adah Sharma	Released theatrically as Bunny: The Perfect Gentleman.
Biriyani	Dum Biryani	Tamil	2013	2016	Karthi, Hansika Motwani	
Endukante... Premanta!	Dangerous Khiladi 5	Telugu	2012	2016	Ram Pothineni, Tamannaah Bhatia, Richard Rishi, Suman Talwar	Also Dubbed in Bhojpuri as Nidar Khiladi (2020)
Anjaan	Khatarnak Khiladi 2	Tamil	2014	2016	Suriya, Vidyut Jammwal, Samantha Ruth Prabhu, Manoj Bajpayee	
Thadaka		Telugu	2013	2016	Naga Chaitanya, Sunil, Tamannaah Bhatia, Andrea Jeremiah	
Maari	Rowdy Hero	Tamil	2015	2016	Dhanush, Kajal Aggarwal, Vijay Yesudas	
Govindudu Andarivadele	Yevadu 2	Telugu	2014	2016	Ram Charan, Kajal Aggarwal, Srikanth, Prakash Raj	
Yaan	Jaan Ki Baazi	Tamil	2014	2016	Jiiva, Thulasi Nair, Nassar	
Jil		Telugu	2015	2016	T. Gopichand, Raashi Khanna, Kabir Duhan Singh	Released theatrically as Jil Ka Toofan.
Saguni	Rowdy Leader	Tamil	2012	2016	Karthi, Pranitha Subhash, Prakash Raj	
Komaram Puli	Jaanbaaz Khiladi	Telugu	2010	2016	Pawan Kalyan, Nikeesha Patel	
Temper		Telugu	2015	2016	N. T. Rama Rao Jr., Kajal Aggarwal, Prakash Raj	Also Dubbed in Bhojpuri as Temper (2020)
Paayum Puli	Main Hoon Rakshak	Tamil	2015	2016	Vishal, Kajal Aggarwal	
Ajay	Zabardast Tevar	Kannada	2006	2016	Puneeth Rajkumar, Anuradha Mehta	Remake of Telugu film Okkadu (2003).
Sarocharu	Jabardast Aashiq	Telugu	2012	2016	Ravi Teja, Kajal Aggarwal, Richa Gangopadhyay	
Kanchana 2		Tamil	2015	2016	Raghava Lawrence, Taapsee Pannu, Nithya Menen, Kovai Sarala	
Siva Manasulo Sruthi	SMS	Telugu	2012	2016	Sudheer Babu, Regina Cassandra	
Aambala		Tamil	2015	2016	Vishal, Hansika Motwani, N. Santhanam	
Nenu Sailaja	The Super Khiladi 3	Telugu	2016	2016	Ram Pothineni, Keerthy Suresh, Sathyaraj	
Mirattal	Daringbaaz Aashiq 2	Tamil	2012	2016	Vinay Rai, Sharmila Mandre, Prabhu, N. Santhanam	Remake of Telugu film Dhee (2006).
Subramanyam For Sale	Patel On Sale	Telugu	2015	2016	Sai Dharam Tej, Regina Cassandra	Also Dubbed in Bhojpuri as Mishra For Sale (2021)
Vedalam		Tamil	2015	2016	Ajith Kumar, Shruti Haasan, Lakshmi Menon	Released theatrically as Vedalam Yani Jungbaaz.
Sudigadu	Hero No. Zero	Telugu	2012	2016	Allari Naresh, Monal Gajjar	
Aranmanai 2	Raj Mahal 2	Tamil	2016	2016	Sundar C., Siddharth Narayan, Trisha Krishnan, Hansika Motwani	
Ishq	Bhaigiri	Telugu	2012	2016	Nithiin, Nithya Menen, Sindhu Tolani, Ajay	
Anegan	Anek	Tamil	2015	2016	Dhanush, Amyra Dastur, Mukesh Tiwari, Karthik	
Vishnuvardhana	Mr. Mobile 2	Kannada	2011	2016	Sudeep, Bhavana, Priyamani, Sonu Sood	
Kaathala Kathala		Tamil	1998	2016	Kamal Haasan, Prabhu Deva	
Akhil: The Power Of Jua		Telugu	2015	2017	Akhil Akkineni, Sayyeshaa	
Swamy Ra Ra		Telugu	2013	2017	Nikhil Siddharth, Swathi Reddy	
Sillunu Oru Kaadhal	Mohabbat Ke Dushman	Tamil	2006	2017	Suriya, Jyothika, Bhumika Chawla	
Super	Rowdy Leader 2	Kannada	2010	2017	Upendra, Nayanthara	
Josh	Jabardast Josh	Telugu	2009	2017	Naga Chaitanya, Karthika Nair	
Thani Oruvan	Double Attack 2	Tamil	2015	2017	Jayam Ravi, Arvind Swamy, Nayanthara	Dubbing rights initially sold to Cinekorn Entertainment who were about to release in Hindi as Dashing Vardiwala but re-sold to Goldmines. Remade in Telugu as Dhruva (2016).
Chiranjeevulu	Aakhri Insaaf	Telugu	2001	2017	Ravi Teja, Sanghavi, Sivaji, Brahmaji, Shiju	
Sura		Tamil	2010	2017	Vijay, Tamannaah Bhatia, Dev Gill	
Sarrainodu		Telugu	2016	2017	Allu Arjun, Rakul Preet Singh, Catherine Tresa, Srikanth, Aadhi Pinisetty	Released theatrically as Sarrainodu Yani Dilwala.
Bairavaa	Bhairava	Tamil	2017	2017	Vijay, Keerthy Suresh, Jagapathi Babu	
Billa	The Return of Rebel 2	Telugu	2009	2017	Prabhas, Anushka Shetty, Namitha, Hansika Motwani, Krishnam Raju	Second remake of Hindi film Don (1978) after Yugandhar (1979). Released theatrically as The Return of Rebel 2 - Mahabali and also dubbed in Bhojpuri as Don Billa (2022)
Theri		Tamil	2016	2017	Vijay, Samantha Ruth Prabhu, Amy Jackson	
Janatha Garage	Janta Garage	Telugu	2016	2017	Mohanlal, N. T. Rama Rao Jr., Samantha Ruth Prabhu, Nithya Menen	
Vaamanan	Dangerous Lover	Tamil	2009	2017	Jai, Priya Anand	
Kalpana	Bhagmati	Kannada	2012	2017	Upendra, Raai Laxmi, P. Sai Kumar	Remake of Tamil film Muni 2: Kanchana (2011).
Hyper	Son of Satyamurthy 2	Telugu	2016	2017	Ram Pothineni, Raashi Khanna, Sathyaraj	Released theatrically as Son of Satyamurthy 2 - Hyper.
Katamarayudu		Telugu	2017	2017	Pawan Kalyan, Shruti Haasan	Remake of Tamil film Veeram (2014). Released theatrically as Katamarayudu Balwaan.
Ekkadiki Pothavu Chinnavada	Ekkadiki	Telugu	2016	2017	Nikhil Siddharth, Hebah Patel, Nandita Swetha, Avika Gor	
Kalpana 2	Bhagmati 2	Kannada	2016	2017	Upendra, Priyamani	Remake of Tamil film Kanchana 2 (2015).
Speedunnodu		Telugu	2016	2017	Bellamkonda Sreenivas, Sonarika Bhadoria	Remake of Tamil film Sundarapandian (2012)
Kodi	Rowdy Hero 2	Tamil	2016	2017	Dhanush, Trisha Krishnan, Anupama Parameswaran	Remade in Kannada as Dhwaja (2018).
L7		Telugu	2015	2017	Ajay, Adith Arun, Pooja Jhaveri	
Kurradu	Race Gurram	Telugu	2009	2017	Varun Sandesh, Neha Sharma, P. Ravi Shankar	Remake of Tamil film Polladhavan (2007)
Santhu Straight Forward	Rambo Straight Forward	Kannada	2016	2017	Yash, Radhika Pandit, Shaam	
Thalaivaa	Thalaivaa: The Leader	Tamil	2013	2017	Vijay, Amala Paul, Sathyaraj	Also Dubbed in Bhojpuri as Vishwaraaj (2022)
Lakshmi Bomb		Telugu	2017	2017	Lakshmi Manchu, Prabhakar, Posani Krishna Murali	
Kaashmora		Tamil	2016	2017	Karthi, Nayanthara, Sri Divya	
Soukhyam	Mard Ki Zaban 2	Telugu	2015	2017	T. Gopichand, Regina Cassandra	
Jaggu Dada	Khatarnak Khiladi 3	Kannada	2016	2017	Darshan, Deeksha Seth, P. Ravi Shankar	
Naan Mahaan Alla	Jungbaaz	Tamil	2010	2017	Karthi, Kajal Aggarwal	
DJ: Duvvada Jagannadham	DJ	Telugu	2017	2017	Allu Arjun, Pooja Hegde, Rao Ramesh, Subbaraju, Murali Sharma	Released theatrically as DJ: Dangerous Jaanbaaz.
Sundarapandian	Fightwala	Tamil	2012	2017	Sasikumar, Lakshmi Menon, Vijay Sethupathi, Soori	Remade in Telugu as Speedunnodu (2016).
Terror		Telugu	2016	2017	Srikanth	
Saagasam	Jeene Nahi Doonga 2	Tamil	2016	2017	Prashanth, Amanda Rosario, Sonu Sood, Thambi Ramaiah	Remake of Telugu film Julayi (2012)
Doosukeltha	Dangerous Khiladi 6	Telugu	2013	2017	Vishnu Manchu, Lavanya Tripathi	Also Dubbed in Bhojpuri as Doosukeltha (2020)
Dhilluku Dhuddu	Raj Mahal 3	Tamil	2016	2017	N. Santhanam, Anchal Singh	Remade in Kannada as Gimmick (2019). Also Dubbed in Bhojpuri as Roohani Mahal (2019)
Pandavulu Pandavulu Tummeda	Sabse Badi Hera Pheri 3	Telugu	2014	2017	Mohan Babu, Vishnu Manchu, Manoj Manchu, Raveena Tandon, Hansika Motwani, Pranitha Subhash	
Aayirathil Oruvan	Kaashmora 2	Tamil	2010	2017	Karthi, Reemma Sen, Andrea Jeremiah	
Dynamite		Telugu	2015	2017	Vishnu Manchu, Pranitha Subhash, J.D. Chakravarthy	Remake of Tamil film Arima Nambi (2014). Also Dubbed in Bhojpuri as Dynamite (2020)
Shivalinga	Kanchana Returns	Tamil	2017	2017	Raghava Lawrence, Ritika Singh	
Geethaanjali		Malayalam	2013	2017	Mohanlal, Keerthy Suresh	Spin-off of Manichithrathazhu (1993).
Nenu Local	Super Khiladi 4	Telugu	2017	2018	Nani, Keerthy Suresh, Naveen Chandra	
Achcham Yenbadhu Madamaiyada	Khatarnak Khiladi 4	Tamil	2016	2018	Silambarasan, Manjima Mohan	Simultaneosly shot Telugu version Sahasam Swasaga Sagipo dubbed and released in Hindi by Pen India Limited as Mujrim Na Kehna in 2018.
Gopala Gopala		Telugu	2015	2018	Daggubati Venkatesh, Pawan Kalyan, Shriya Saran, Mithun Chakraborty	Remake of Hindi film OMG: Oh My God (2012). Released theatrically in Hindi as Nehle Pe Dehla.
Luckunnodu	Sabse Bada Zero	Telugu	2017	2018	Vishnu Manchu, Hansika Motwani	
All in All Azhagu Raja	Hero No. Zero 2	Tamil	2013	2018	Karthi, Kajal Aggarwal, N. Santhanam	
Chanti	Main Insaaf Karoonga 2	Telugu	2004	2018	Ravi Teja, Charmme Kaur, Daisy Bopanna	
Kanthaswamy	Temper 2	Tamil	2009	2018	Vikram, Shriya Saran, Ashish Vidyarthi	Partially re-shot in Telugu as Mallanna, dubbed and released in Hindi by Zee Entertainment as Shiva - The Superhero in 2011.
Thikka	Rocket Raja	Telugu	2016	2018	Sai Dharam Tej, Larissa Bonesi	
Oru Melliya Kodu	Killer Kaun	Tamil	2016	2018	Arjun Sarja, Shaam	
Eedo Rakam Aado Rakam	Hyper	Telugu	2016	2018	Vishnu Manchu, Raj Tarun, Sonarika Bhadoria, Hebah Patel	
Thupparivaalan	Dashing Detective	Tamil	2017	2018	Vishal, Prasanna, Anu Emmanuel	
Gulaebaghavali		Tamil	2018	2018	Prabhu Deva, Hansika Motwani	
Mister 420	Super King No. 1	Telugu	2016	2018	Varun Sandesh, Priyanka Bharadwaj	
Aramm	Tejasvini	Tamil	2017	2018	Nayanthara	
Parunthu	Blade Mafia	Malayalam	2008	2018	Mammootty, Jayasurya	
Dongala Mutha	Apradhi Kaun	Telugu	2011	2018	Ravi Teja, Charmme Kaur	
Vikram Vedha		Tamil	2017	2018	R. Madhavan, Vijay Sethupathi, Shraddha Srinath, Varalaxmi Sarathkumar	
Basanti	Terror 2	Telugu	2014	2018	Raja Goutham	
Demonte Colony		Tamil	2015	2018	Arulnithi, Ramesh Thilak, Sananth	
Abhinetri	Abhinetri No. 1	Telugu	2016	2018	Prabhu Deva, Tamannaah Bhatia, Sonu Sood	Simultaneously shot in Hindi as Tutak Tutak Tutiya with a different climax.
Vivegam		Tamil	2017	2018	Ajith Kumar, Kajal Aggarwal, Vivek Oberoi	Released theatrically as Veer Vivegam.
Happy Happy Ga	Mera Saathi	Telugu	2010	2018	Varun Sandesh	
Moondraam Ullaga Por	Ek Aur Mahayudh	Tamil	2016	2018	Sunil Kumar, Akhila Kishore, Wilson Ng	
Paisa Vasool		Telugu	2017	2018	Nandamuri Balakrishna, Shriya Saran, Musskan Sethi, Vikramjeet Virk	
Chinnadana Nee Kosam	Sabse Badhkar Hum 3	Telugu	2014	2018	Nithiin, Mishti, Nassar	
Paruthiveeran	Meri Awargi	Tamil	2007	2018	Karthi, Priyamani	
Charuseela		Telugu	2016	2018	Dhanya Balakrishna, Rajeev Kanakala	
Bhooloham	Bhaigiri 2	Tamil	2015	2018	Jayam Ravi, Trisha Krishnan	
Gunde Jaari Gallanthayyinde	Heart Attack 2	Telugu	2013	2018	Nithiin, Nithya Menen, Isha Talwar	
Dora	Kanchana: The Wonder Car	Tamil	2017	2018	Nayanthara, Thambi Ramaiah, Harish Uthaman, Sulile Kumar	
MCA: Middle Class Abbayi		Telugu	2017	2018	Nani, Sai Pallavi, Bhumika Chawla	
Ko	The Real Leader	Tamil	2011	2018	Jiiva, Karthika Nair, Piaa Bajpai	
Jawaan		Telugu	2017	2018	Sai Dharam Tej, Mehreen Pirzada, Prasanna	
Vanamagan	Tarzan: The Heman	Tamil	2017	2018	Jayam Ravi, Sayyeshaa, Prakash Raj	
Mummy		Kannada	2016	2018	Priyanka Upendra, Yuvina Parthavi	
Kathalo Rajakumari	Royal Queen	Telugu	2017	2018	Nara Rohit, Namitha Pramod	
Bombaat	Sabse Bada Chaalbaaz	Kannada	2008	2018	Ganesh, Ramya	
Saithan	Shaitan	Tamil	2016	2018	Vijay Antony, Arundhati Nair	
Fidaa		Telugu	2017	2018	Varun Tej, Sai Pallavi	
Touch Chesi Chudu	Power Unlimited 2	Telugu	2018	2018	Ravi Teja, Raashi Khanna, Seerat Kapoor	Also Dubbed in Bhojpuri as Kartik Ke Insaaf (2020)
Thee	Insaaf Ki Pukar	Tamil	2009	2018	Sundar C., Namitha, Ramya Raj, Vivek, Sayaji Shinde	
Guru		Telugu	2017	2018	Daggubati Venkatesh, Ritika Singh	Remake of Hindi film Saala Khadoos (2016).
Nibunan	Intelligent	Tamil	2017	2018	Arjun Sarja, Prasanna, Varalaxmi Sarathkumar	Bilingual film
Vismaya	Jigarbaaz	Kannada	2017	2018	Arjun Sarja, Prasanna, Varalaxmi Sarathkumar	Bilingual film
Maan Karate	Hero No. Zero 3	Tamil	2014	2018	Sivakarthikeyan, Hansika Motwani	
Hebbuli		Kannada	2017	2018	Sudeep, Amala Paul, V. Ravichandran	Released theatrically as Hebbuli - Khatarnak Tiger.
Tholi Prema	Mere Sajna	Telugu	1998	2018	Pawan Kalyan, Keerthi Reddy	Remade in Hindi as Mujhe Kucch Kehna Hai (2001).
Badmaash		Kannada	2016	2018	Dhananjay, Sanchita Shetty, Achyuth Kumar	
Theeran Adhigaaram Ondru	Theeran	Tamil	2017	2018	Karthi, Rakul Preet Singh, Abhimanyu Singh	
Meow		Tamil	2016	2018	Raja, Urmila Gayathri, Hayden	
Varsha	Sabse Bada Jigarwala	Kannada	2005	2018	Vishnuvardhan, Ramesh Aravind, Manya, Komal Kumar, Doddanna, Hemashree	
Gayatri		Telugu	2018	2018	Mohan Babu, Vishnu Manchu, Shriya Saran	
Yaare Koogadali	Nayak: The Hero 2	Kannada	2012	2018	Puneeth Rajkumar, Bhavana	
Remo		Tamil	2016	2018	Sivakarthikeyan, Keerthy Suresh	
Agnyaathavaasi	Yevadu 3	Telugu	2018	2018	Pawan Kalyan, Keerthy Suresh, Anu Emmanuel	
Saptagiri Express		Telugu	2016	2018	Saptagiri, Roshni Prakash, Posani Krishna Murali, Sayaji Shinde	
Tik Tik Tik		Tamil	2018	2018	Jayam Ravi, Nivetha Pethuraj, Aaron Aziz	Also Dubbed in Bhojpuri as Tik Tik Tik (2020)
Anando Brahma	Kanchana 3	Telugu	2017	2018	Taapsee Pannu, Srinivasa Reddy, Vennela Kishore	
Sakalakala Vallavan	Anokha Rishta	Tamil	2015	2018	Jayam Ravi, Trisha Krishnan, Anjali	
Lucky	Heart Attack 3	Kannada	2012	2018	Yash, Ramya	
Sketch		Tamil	2018	2018	Vikram, Tamannaah Bhatia	
Doddmane Hudga	Rajkumar	Kannada	2016	2018	Puneeth Rajkumar, Radhika Pandit	
Yuddham Sharanam		Telugu	2017	2018	Naga Chaitanya, Lavanya Tripathi	
Sethupathi		Tamil	2016	2018	Vijay Sethupathi, Remya Nambeesan	
Yaamirukka Bayamey	Raj Mahal 4	Tamil	2014	2018	Kreshna, Rupa Manjari, Oviya	
Missamma	Namastey Madam	Telugu	2003	2018	Bhumika Chawla, Sivaji, Laya	
Preethsod Thappa	Nayak: The Hero 3	Kannada	1998	2018	V. Ravichandran, Shilpa Shetty	
Muppozhudhum Un Karpanaigal	Meri Dhadkan	Tamil	2012	2018	Atharvaa, Amala Paul	
Rogue	Hero: The Action Man 2	Kannada	2017	2018	Ishan, Mannara Chopra, Angela Krislinzki	Shot simultaneously in Telugu which was also dubbed in Hindi with the same name Rogue.
Velaikkaran	Ghayal Khiladi	Tamil	2017	2019	Sivakarthikeyan, Nayanthara, Fahadh Faasil	
Vunnadhi Okate Zindagi	No. 1 Dilwala	Telugu	2017	2019	Ram Pothineni, Sree Vishnu, Lavanya Tripathi, Anupama Parameswaran	
Aatadukundam Raa	Mera Intekam	Telugu	2016	2019	Sushanth, Sonam Bajwa	
Om Shanti		Telugu	2010	2019	Navdeep, Kajal Aggarwal, Bindu Madhavi, Nikhil Siddharth, Aditi Sharma	
Oru Nalla Naal Paathu Solren	Kahani Mein Twist	Tamil	2018	2019	Vijay Sethupathi, Gautham Karthik, Niharika Konidela, Gayathrie	
Romeo Juliet		Tamil	2015	2019	Jayam Ravi, Hansika Motwani	
Nela Ticket		Telugu	2018	2019	Ravi Teja, Malvika Sharma, Jagapathi Babu	Released theatrically as Dumdaar Nela Ticket.
Raa Raa		Telugu	2018	2019	Srikanth, Naziya, Seetha Narayana	
Yevade Subramanyam	Yeh Hai Zindagi	Telugu	2015	2019	Nani, Vijay Deverakonda, Malavika Nair	
Kavan		Tamil	2017	2019	Vijay Sethupathi, Madonna Sebastian	
Maanagaram	Dadagiri 2	Tamil	2017	2019	Sundeep Kishan, Regina Cassandra, Sri	
Bommana Brothers Chandana Sisters	Daringbaaz Lootere	Telugu	2008	2019	Allari Naresh, Krishna Bhagavaan, Farjana, Charulatha, Kota Srinivasa Rao	
Soodhu Kavvum	Rummy: The Great Gambler	Tamil	2013	2019	Vijay Sethupathi, Bobby Simha, Ashok Selvan, Ramesh Thilak, Karunakaran, Sanchita Shetty	
Sevakudu	Meri Sazish	Telugu	2013	2019	Srikanth, Krishna, Charmme Kaur, Manjula Ghattamaneni	
Kalavani	Dil Ka Raja	Tamil	2010	2019	Vimal, Oviya	
Sneha Geetham		Telugu	2010	2019	Sundeep Kishan, Suhani Kalita, Chaitanya Krishna, Ria, Venky Atluri, Shreya Dhanwanthary	
Bhaskar Oru Rascal	Mawali Raaj	Tamil	2018	2019	Arvind Swamy, Amala Paul	Remake of Malayalam film Bhaskar the Rascal (2015).
Achari America Yatra	Thugs of Amrica	Telugu	2018	2019	Vishnu Manchu, Brahmanandam, Pragya Jaiswal	
Vasuvum Saravananum Onna Padichavanga	Lafange Deewane	Tamil	2015	2019	Arya, N. Santhanam, Tamannaah Bhatia	
Wife of Ram		Telugu	2018	2019	Lakshmi Manchu	
Maari 2	Maari	Tamil	2018	2019	Dhanush, Sai Pallavi, Tovino Thomas, Varalaxmi Sarathkumar	
Maryan		Tamil	2013	2019	Dhanush, Parvathy Thiruvothu	
Amar Akbar Anthony	Amar Akhbar Anthoni	Telugu	2018	2019	Ravi Teja, Ileana D'Cruz	
Rowdy		Telugu	2014	2019	Mohan Babu, Vishnu Manchu	Remake of Hindi film Sarkar (2005).
Velainu Vandhutta Vellaikaaran	Disco Raja	Tamil	2016	2019	Vishnu Vishal, Nikki Galrani	Remade in Telugu as Silly Fellows (2018).
Aadi Lakshmi	Main Hoon Ziddi	Telugu	2006	2019	Srikanth	
Irumbu Thirai	The Return of Abhimanyu	Tamil	2018	2019	Vishal, Arjun Sarja, Samantha Ruth Prabhu	
Jamba Lakidi Pamba		Telugu	2018	2019	Srinivasa Reddy, Siddhi Idnani, Vennela Kishore, Posani Krishna Murali	
Indrajith	The Real Jackpot 2	Tamil	2017	2019	Gautham Karthik, Ashrita Shetty, Sonarika Bhadoria	
Jersey		Telugu	2019	2019	Nani, Shraddha Srinath, Sathyaraj, Ronit Kamra	Remade in Hindi with the same name.
Varuthapadatha Valibar Sangam	Main Tujhpe Qurban	Tamil	2013	2019	Sivakarthikeyan, Sathyaraj	Remade in Kannada as Adyaksha (2014) and in Telugu as Current Theega (2014)
Airaa		Tamil	2019	2019	Nayanthara, Kalaiyarasan	
Aa Okkadu	Kodi	Telugu	2009	2019	Ajay, Madhurima, Suresh Gopi	
Team 5		Malayalam	2017	2019	S. Sreesanth, Nikki Galrani	
Pandem	Mera Challenge	Telugu	2005	2019	Jagapathi Babu, Kalyani	
Cobra		Malayalam	2012	2019	Mammootty, Lal	
Kurubana Rani	Dora	Kannada	1998	2019	Shiva Rajkumar, Nagma, Hema Choudhary, Sumitra	
Maurya		Kannada	2004	2019	Puneeth Rajkumar, Meera Jasmine, Roja Selvamani	Remake of Telugu film Amma Nanna O Tamila Ammayi (2003).
Shambu	Sabse Bada Leader	Malayalam	2004	2019	Vijayakumar, Karthika Mathew, Geetha, Riyaz Khan, Rajan P. Dev, Babu Antony	
RangiTaranga		Kannada	2015	2019	Nirup Bhandari, Radhika Chetan	
Arima Nambi	Angry Sher	Tamil	2014	2019	Vikram Prabhu, Priya Anand, J.D. Chakravarthy	Remade in Telugu as Dynamite (2015).
Potugadu		Telugu	2013	2019	Manoj Manchu, Sakshi Chaudhary, Simran Kaur Mundi, Rachel, Anupriya Goenka	
Silukkuvarupatti Singam	The Fighterman Singham 2	Tamil	2018	2019	Vishnu Vishal, Regina Cassandra	
U Turn		Telugu	2018	2019	Samantha Ruth Prabhu, Aadhi Pinisetty, Rahul Ravindran, Bhumika Chawla, Narain	Remake of Kannada film U Turn (2016).
Manam Kothi Paravai	Main Hoon Albela	Tamil	2012	2019	Sivakarthikeyan, Athmiya Rajan	
'96		Tamil	2018	2019	Vijay Sethupathi, Trisha Krishnan	
Katha Nayagan	Dashing Hero	Tamil	2017	2019	Vishnu Vishal, Catherine Tresa	
Kee		Tamil	2019	2019	Jiiva, Nikki Galrani, Govind Padmasoorya, Anaika Soti	
Chitralahari	Premam	Telugu	2019	2019	Sai Dharam Tej, Kalyani Priyadarshan, Nivetha Pethuraj	
Dev		Tamil	2019	2019	Karthi, Rakul Preet Singh, Prakash Raj, Ramya Krishnan	
Anbanavan Asaradhavan Adangadhavan	Khel Kismat Ka	Tamil	2017	2019	Silambarasan, Tamannaah Bhatia, Shriya Saran	
Run Raja Run		Telugu	2014	2019	Sharwanand, Seerat Kapoor, Adivi Sesh	
Satham Podathey	Dost Aur Dushman	Tamil	2007	2019	Prithviraj Sukumaran, Padmapriya, Nithin Sathya	
Maaveeran Kittu		Tamil	2016	2019	Vishnu Vishal, Sri Divya, R. Parthiban	
Shailaja Reddy Alludu	Thadaka 2	Telugu	2018	2019	Naga Chaitanya, Anu Emmanuel, Ramya Krishnan	
Ghajinikanth		Tamil	2018	2019	Arya, Sayyeshaa, Sampath Raj	
Aandavan Kattalai	Pappu Passport	Tamil	2016	2020	Vijay Sethupathi, Ritika Singh	
Evadi Gola Vaadidhi	Sabse Bada Gadbad Ghotala	Telugu	2005	2020	Aryan Rajesh, Deepika	
Kanithan		Tamil	2016	2020	Atharvaa, Catherine Tresa, Tarun Arora	
Maryade Ramanna	Dum 3	Kannada	2011	2020	Komal Kumar, Nisha Shah, Mukesh Rishi	
Dear Comrade		Telugu	2019	2020	Vijay Deverakonda, Rashmika Mandanna	
Thiruttu Payale 2	The Digital Thief	Tamil	2017	2020	Bobby Simha, Prasanna, Amala Paul	
Raju Gari Gadhi 3	Kanchana 4	Telugu	2019	2020	Ashwin Babu, Avika Gor	
Vijetha		Telugu	2018	2020	Kalyaan Dhev, Murali Sharma, Malavika Nair	
Prati Roju Pandage	Har Din Diwali	Telugu	2019	2020	Sai Dharam Tej, Raashi Khanna, Sathyaraj	
Saivam	Pakk Pakk Pappaa	Tamil	2014	2020	Nassar, Sara Arjun	
Mr. Majnu		Telugu	2019	2020	Akhil Akkineni, Niddhi Agerwal	
Ye Mantram Vesave	Pyar Ka Khel	Telugu	2018	2020	Vijay Deverakonda, Shivani	
Sixer		Tamil	2019	2020	Vaibhav, Palak Lalwani, Sathish	
Kedi Billa Killadi Ranga	Sabse Bada Zero 2	Tamil	2013	2020	Vimal, Sivakarthikeyan, Bindu Madhavi, Regina Cassandra	
Dwaraka		Telugu	2017	2020	Vijay Deverakonda, Pooja Jhaveri, Prakash Raj, Prudhviraj, Murali Sharma	Dubbing rights initially sold to Sri Balaji Cine Media who were about to release in Hindi as Arjun Ki Dwaraka Bhoomi but re-sold to Goldmines.
Marudhamalai	Policewala Gunda 4	Tamil	2007	2020	Arjun Sarja, Meera Chopra, Vadivelu, Lal, Raghuvaran	
Comali		Tamil	2019	2020	Jayam Ravi, Kajal Aggarwal	
Ravanna	Jaan Ki Baazi 2	Telugu	2000	2020	Rajasekhar, Krishna, Soundarya	
Seethakaathi		Tamil	2018	2020	Vijay Sethupathi	
Thambi	My Brother Vicky	Tamil	2019	2020	Karthi, Jyothika, Sathyaraj	
Bluff Master		Telugu	2018	2020	Satyadev, Nandita Swetha, Brahmaji	
Vada Chennai	Chennai Central	Tamil	2018	2020	Dhanush, Aishwarya Rajesh	
Naa Nuvve	Diljala Aashiq	Telugu	2018	2020	Nandamuri Kalyan Ram, Tamannaah Bhatia	
Thiruthani	Double Cross	Tamil	2012	2020	Bharath, Sunaina, Rajkiran	
Maaya		Telugu	2014	2020	Harshvardhan Rane, Avantika Mishra, Sushma Raj	
Siruthai		Tamil	2011	2020	Karthi, Tamannaah Bhatia, N. Santhanam	Remake of Telugu film Vikramarkudu (2006)
Inimey Ippadithaan	Hyper 2	Tamil	2015	2020	N. Santhanam, Ashna Zaveri, Akhila Kishore	
Lisaa		Telugu	2019	2020	Anjali, Brahmanandam	
Chandi Veeran	Vilayati Hero	Tamil	2015	2020	Atharvaa, Anandhi, Lal	
Sathya		Tamil	2017	2020	Sibi Sathyaraj, Remya Nambeesan, Varalaxmi Sarathkumar	
Uppu Huli Khara	Double Taddkaa	Kannada	2017	2020	Malashri, Shashi Devraj, Sharath, Anushree, B. Dhananjay, Jayashree, Shamanth Shetty	
Kaithi		Tamil	2019	2020	Karthi, Narain, Arjun Das	
Malligadu Marriage Bureau	Marriage Bureau	Telugu	2014	2020	Srikanth, Brahmanandam	
Sawaari		Tamil	2016	2020	Benito Franklin, Sanam Shetty, Karthik Yogi, Mathivanan Rajendran	
Adyaksha	Rocket Raja 2	Kannada	2014	2020	Sharan, Hebah Patel	Remake of Tamil film Varuthapadatha Valibar Sangam (2013)
Action		Tamil	2019	2020	Vishal, Tamannaah Bhatia, Aishwarya Lekshmi, Akanksha Puri, Kabir Duhan Singh	
Ennamo Nadakkudhu	Meri Taqat Mera Faisla 3	Tamil	2014	2020	Vijay Vasanth, Mahima Nambiar, Prabhu, Rahman	
Pretham	Rajmahal Returns	Malayalam	2016	2020	Jayasurya	Remade in Telugu as Raju Gari Gadhi 2 (2017).
Kadhal Azhivathillai	Daringbaaz Aashiq 3	Tamil	2002	2020	Silambarasan, Charmme Kaur, T. Rajendar	
Hitudu		Telugu	2015	2020	Jagapathi Babu, Meera Nandan	
Semma Botha Aagathey	Kahani Kismat Ki	Tamil	2018	2020	Atharvaa, Mishti, Anaika Soti	
Andari Bandhuvaya	Daan Veer 2	Telugu	2010	2020	Sharwanand, Padmapriya, Naresh, Vijay Sai, Pragathi, Jeeva	
Aruvi		Tamil	2017	2020	Aditi Balan, Anjali Varadhan, Lakshmi Gopalaswamy	
Saravana	Dangerous Khiladi 7	Tamil	2006	2020	Silambarasan, Jyothika, Prakash Raj, Five Star Krishna	Remake of Telugu film Bhadra (2005)
Kinavalli		Malayalam	2018	2020	Ajmal Zayn, Surabhi Santosh, Krrish Menon	
Avunu Valliddaru Ista Paddaru!	Main Tera Tu Meri	Telugu	2002	2020	Ravi Teja, Kalyani	
Puppy		Tamil	2019	2020	Varun, Samyuktha Hegde	
Naachiyaar	Tejasvini 2	Tamil	2018	2020	Jyothika, G. V. Prakash Kumar, Ivana	
Jack & Daniel		Malayalam	2019	2020	Dileep, Arjun Sarja	
Carry On Jatta 2	Carry On Balle Balle	Punjabi	2018	2020	Gippy Grewal, Sonam Bajwa, Gurpreet Ghuggi	
Mantra		Telugu	2007	2020	Sivaji, Charmme Kaur	
Idhu Namma Aalu	Premam 2	Tamil	2016	2020	Silambarasan, Nayanthara, Andrea Jeremiah	
Silly Fellows		Telugu	2018	2020	Allari Naresh, Sunil, Chitra Shukla, Nandini Rai, Jaya Prakash Reddy	Remake of Tamil film Velainu Vandhutta Vellaikaaran (2016)
Thenmerku Paruvakaatru	Aisi Deewangi	Tamil	2010	2020	Vijay Sethupathi, Saranya Ponvannan, Vasundhra Chiyertra	
Puthiya Niyamam	Mera Sangharsh	Malayalam	2016	2020	Mammootty, Nayanthara, Sheelu Abraham, Roshan Mathew	
Bhale Bhale Magadivoy	My Name Is Lucky	Telugu	2015	2020	Nani, Lavanya Tripathi, Murali Sharma	Remade in Tamil as Ghajinikanth (2018).
Raatchasi	Madam Geeta Rani	Tamil	2019	2020	Jyothika, Hareesh Peradi	
Express Raja		Telugu	2016	2020	Sharwanand, Surbhi	
Kanna Laddu Thinna Aasaiya	Teen Tigada Pyar Bigada	Tamil	2013	2020	N. Santhanam, Sethu, Srinivasan, Vishakha Singh	
Dorasaani	Tejasvini 3	Telugu	2019	2020	Anand Devarakonda, Shivatmika Rajashekar	
Kazhugu 2	Shatir Chor	Tamil	2019	2020	Kreshna, Bindu Madhavi, Kaali Venkat	
Idhaya Thirudan	Mard Ki Zaban 3	Tamil	2006	2020	Jayam Ravi, Kamna Jethmalani, Prakash Raj	
Jaganmohini		Telugu	2009	2020	Raja Abel, Namitha, Meera Chopra, Vadivelu, Kota Srinivasa Rao	Simultaneously shot Tamil version also dubbed in Hindi.
Thiruttu Payale	The Digital Thief 2	Tamil	2006	2020	Jeevan, Sonia Agarwal, Abbas, Malavika, Vivek, Manoj K. Jayan, Charle	Remade in Hindi as Shortcut Romeo (2013).
Agent Sai Srinivasa Athreya	Agent Sai	Telugu	2019	2021	Naveen Polishetty, Shruti Sharma	
Kanaa	Not Out	Tamil	2018	2021	Aishwarya Rajesh, Sathyaraj, Sivakarthikeyan	
World Famous Lover		Telugu	2020	2021	Vijay Deverakonda, Raashi Khanna, Aishwarya Rajesh, Izabelle Leite, Catherine Tresa	
Miss India		Telugu	2020	2021	Keerthy Suresh, Jagapathi Babu, Naveen Chandra, Rajendra Prasad	
Aruvam	Be Shakal	Tamil	2019	2021	Siddharth Narayan, Catherine Tresa	
Malli Malli Idi Rani Roju	Real Diljala	Telugu	2015	2021	Sharwanand, Nithya Menen	
Anthaku Minchi		Telugu	2018	2021	Rashmi Gautam, Jai	
V		Telugu	2020	2021	Nani, Sudheer Babu, Nivetha Thomas, Aditi Rao Hydari	Released on Amazon Prime Video.
Mahanubhavudu	Gajab Prem Ki Ajab Kahani	Telugu	2017	2021	Sharwanand, Mehreen Pirzada	
Asuran		Tamil	2019	2021	Dhanush, Manju Warrier	
Manal Kayiru 2	Kismatwala	Tamil	2016	2021	S. Ve. Shekhar, Jayashree, Ashwin Shekhar, Poorna, Visu, Jagan	
Aadu Magaadra Bujji	Jabardast Aashiq 2	Telugu	2013	2021	Sudheer Babu, Asmita Sood, Ajay, Randhir Gattla, Poonam Kaur	
Valeba Raja		Tamil	2016	2021	N. Santhanam, Sethu, Vishakha Singh, Nushrat Bharucha	
Kennedy Club		Tamil	2019	2021	M. Sasikumar, Bharathiraja, Meenakshi Govindarajan, Soori	
Soorarai Pottru	Udaan	Tamil	2020	2021	Suriya, Paresh Rawal, Aparna Balamurali	Released on Amazon Prime Video.
ABCD: American Born Confused Desi		Telugu	2019	2021	Allu Sirish, Rukshar Dhillon, Nagendra Babu, Master Bharath	
Magamuni	Mahamuni	Tamil	2019	2021	Arya, Indhuja Ravichandran, Mahima Nambiar	
Padi Padi Leche Manasu	Dil Dhadak Dhadak	Telugu	2018	2021	Sharwanand, Sai Pallavi	
Gurkha		Tamil	2019	2021	Yogi Babu, Elyssa Erhardt, Anandaraj, Charle, Raj Bharath	
Parris Jeyaraj		Tamil	2021	2021	N. Santhanam, Anaika Soti, Prudhvi Raj, Rajendran	
Thottal Poo Malarum	Daringbaaz Khiladi Returns	Tamil	2007	2021	Sakthi Vasu, Gowri Munjal, Rajkiran, Sukanya, Vadivelu, Nassar, N. Santhanam	
Odeya		Kannada	2019	2021	Darshan, Sanah Thimmayyah, Devaraj, P. Ravi Shankar	Remake of Tamil film Veeram (2014)
Kolaiyudhir Kaalam	Mera Rakshak	Tamil	2019	2021	Nayanthara, Bhumika Chawla	
Jaanu		Telugu	2020	2021	Sharwanand, Samantha Ruth Prabhu	
Namma Veetu Pillai	Ek Hazaron Mein Meri Behna Hai	Tamil	2019	2021	Sivakarthikeyan, Anu Emmanuel, Aishwarya Rajesh	
Srivalli		Telugu	2017	2021	Neha Hinge, Rajath Krishna	
Prema Baraha	Lady Singham	Kannada	2018	2021	Chandan Kumar, Aishwarya Arjun	
Ranarangam	Don Returns	Telugu	2019	2021	Sharwanand, Kajal Aggarwal, Kalyani Priyadarshan	
Killing Veerappan		Kannada	2016	2021	Shiva Rajkumar, Sandeep Bharadwaj	
Kappal	Main Hoon Dilwala	Tamil	2014	2021	Vaibhav Reddy, Sonam Bajwa	
Tamaar Padaar	The Real De Dana Dan 2	Malayalam	2014	2021	Prithviraj Sukumaran, Baburaj	
Neethaane En Ponvasantham	Inteha Pyar Ki	Tamil	2012	2021	Jiiva, Samantha Ruth Prabhu	
Kathe Chitrakathe Nirdeshana Puttanna	Bhagmati Returns	Kannada	2016	2021	Komal Kumar, Priyamani, P. Ravi Shankar	
Danny		Tamil	2020	2021	Varalaxmi Sarathkumar	
Taana		Tamil	2020	2021	Vaibhav, Nandita Swetha	
Parole	Parol	Malayalam	2018	2021	Mammootty, Ineya, Miya, Suraj Venjaramoodu, Siddique	
TejaBhai and Family		Malayalam	2011	2021	Prithviraj Sukumaran, Akhila, Suraj Venjaramoodu	
Laddu Babu		Telugu	2014	2021	Allari Naresh, Bhumika Chawla, Kota Srinivasa Rao	
Poola Rangadu	Thadaka Returns	Telugu	2012	2021	Sunil, Isha Chawla	
Vana Yuddham		Tamil	2013	2021	Arjun Sarja, Kishore	
Biskoth	Biskut	Tamil	2020	2021	N. Santhanam, Tara Alisha Berry	
Aadyaa		Kannada	2020	2021	Chiranjeevi Sarja, Sangeetha Bhat	
Rendu		Tamil	2006	2021	R. Madhavan, Anushka Shetty, Reemma Sen, Vadivelu	
Pudhukottaiyilirundhu Saravanan	Sabse Bada Gambler	Tamil	2004	2021	Dhanush, Aparna Pillai, Karunas, Sridevi Ashok	
Pushpa: The Rise - Part 1		Telugu	2021	2021	Allu Arjun, Fahadh Faasil, Rashmika Mandanna	Distributed in Hindi by AA Films
Iruttu Araiyil Murattu Kuththu	The Return of Rajmahal	Tamil	2018	2021	Gautham Karthik, Yaashika Aannand	
Jai Bhim		Tamil	2021	2021	Suriya, Lijomol Jose, Manikandan, Rajisha Vijayan, Prakash Raj, Rao Ramesh	Released on Amazon Prime Video.
Sangolli Rayanna	Bulandi	Kannada	2012	2021	Darshan, Jayaprada, Shashi Kumar, Nikita Thukral	
Marina		Tamil	2012	2021	Sivakarthikeyan, Oviya, Pakoda Pandian	
U Turn	Flyover - Ek Mystery	Kannada	2016	2021	Shraddha Srinath, Roger Narayan, Radhika Chetan, Dileep Raj	Remade simultaneously in Telugu and Tamil as U Turn (2018).
Ala Vaikunthapurramuloo		Telugu	2020	2022	Allu Arjun, Pooja Hegde, Tabu, Jayaram, Sushanth, Nivetha Pethuraj, Murali Sharma	
Bheeshma		Telugu	2020	2022	Nithiin, Rashmika Mandanna	
Lahiri Lahiri Lahirilo	Meri Himmat 2	Telugu	2002	2022	Nandamuri Harikrishna, Aditya Om, Ankitha, Bhanupriya, Suman Talwar, Rachana, Vineeth, Sanghavi	
Gaddalakonda Ganesh		Telugu	2019	2022	Varun Tej, Atharvaa, Pooja Hegde, Mirnalini Ravi	
Sambayya	Sultan E Hind	Telugu	1999	2022	Srihari, Prakash Raj, Radhika Chaudhari	
Mersal		Tamil	2017	2022	Vijay, Kajal Aggarwal, Samantha Ruth Prabhu, Nithya Menen, S.J. Suryah, Sathyaraj	
Pravarakhyudu	Mera Karam	Telugu	2009	2022	Jagapathi Babu, Priyamani	
Jackpot		Tamil	2019	2022	Jyothika, Revathi, Yogi Babu, Anandaraj	
HIT: The First Case		Telugu	2020	2022	Vishwak Sen, Ruhani Sharma	Remade in Hindi with the same name in 2022.
Pretham 2	Saaya	Malayalam	2018	2022	Jayasurya, Sidhartha Siva, Saniya Iyappan, Amith Chakalakkal, Durga Krishna, Dain Davis	
Aranmanai 3		Tamil	2021	2022	Sundar C., Arya, Raashi Khanna, Andrea Jeremiah	
Teddy		Tamil	2021	2022	Arya, Sayyeshaa	
Raja The Great		Telugu	2017	2022	Ravi Teja, Mehreen Pirzada, Raadhika Sarathkumar	
Anjaam Pathiraa	Police Story	Malayalam	2020	2022	Kunchacko Boban, Sharaf U Dheen, Sreenath Bhasi, Jinu Joseph, Unnimaya Prasad	
Sarileru Neekevvaru	Sarileru	Telugu	2020	2022	Mahesh Babu, Rashmika Mandanna, Vijayashanti, Prakash Raj	
Next Enti?	Kya Bolti Tu?	Telugu	2018	2022	Tamannaah Bhatia, Sundeep Kishan, Navdeep	
Bangaru Bullodu	Gold Thief	Telugu	2021	2022	Allari Naresh, Pooja Jhaveri	
Red		Telugu	2021	2022	Ram Pothineni, Nivetha Pethuraj, Malvika Sharma, Amritha Aiyer	Remake of Tamil film Thadam (2018).
Viswasam		Tamil	2019	2022	Ajith Kumar, Nayanthara, Jagapathi Babu, Vivek	
The Ghost		Telugu	2022	2022	Akkineni Nagarjuna, Sonal Chauhan, Gul Panag	
Doctor		Tamil	2021	2022	Sivakarthikeyan, Vinay Rai, Priyanka Arul Mohan	
Bigil		Tamil	2019	2022	Vijay, Nayanthara, Jackie Shroff, Vivek	
Mookuthi Amman		Tamil	2020	2022	Nayanthara, RJ Balaji	
Varisu		Tamil	2023	2023	Vijay, Rashmika Mandanna, R. Sarathkumar, Srikanth, Shaam	Distributed in Hindi by AA Films.
Drushyam	Aankhen	Telugu	2014	2023	Daggubati Venkatesh, Meena, Nadhiya, Kruthika Jayakumar, Esther Anil	Premiered back-to-back on Goldmines TV channel.
Drushyam 2	Aankhen 2	Telugu	2021	2023	Daggubati Venkatesh, Meena, Nadhiya, Sampath Raj, Kruthika Jayakumar, Esther Anil	Premiered back-to-back on Goldmines TV channel.
Maha		Tamil	2022	2023	Hansika Motwani, Srikanth, Manasvi Kottachi	
Vattam	Circle	Tamil	2022	2023	Sibi Sathyaraj, Andrea Jeremiah, Athulya Ravi	
Thunivu		Tamil	2023	2023	Ajith Kumar, Manju Warrier, Samuthirakani, John Kokken	
Bhaskar the Rascal		Malayalam	2015	2023	Mammootty, Nayanthara, Sanoop Santhosh, Anikha Surendran, J. D. Chakravarthy, Kalabhavan Shajon	Remade in Tamil as Bhaskar Oru Rascal (2018).
Oh! Baby		Telugu	2019	2023	Samantha Ruth Prabhu, Lakshmi, Rajendra Prasad, Rao Ramesh, Sajja Teja	
Arima Nambi	Angry Lover	Tamil	2014	2023	Vikram Prabhu, Priya Anand, J. D. Chakravarthy	Remade in Telugu as Dynamite and also Dubbed in Bhojpuri as Jigarbaaz Sher (2023)
Vaathi	Sir	Tamil	2023	2023	Dhanush, Samyuktha Menon, P. Sai Kumar, Samuthirakani	
Vinaya Vidheya Rama		Telugu	2019	2023	Ram Charan, Kiara Advani, Vivek Oberoi	
Virupaksha		Telugu	2023	2023	Sai Dharam Tej, Samyuktha Menon, Sunil, Brahmaji, Rajeev Kanakala, Ajay	
Cold Case	Police Story 2	Malayalam	2021	2023	Prithviraj Sukumaran, Aditi Balan, Pooja Mohanraj, Anil Nedumangad, Lakshmi Priyaa Chandramouli, Anand, Rajesh Hebbar	
Lift		Tamil	2021	2023	Kavin, Amritha Aiyer, Gayathri Reddy	
Ruler		Telugu	2019	2023	Nandamuri Balakrishna, Vedhika, Sonal Chauhan, Bhumika Chawla	
F3: Fun and Frustration		Telugu	2022	2023	Venkatesh, Varun Tej, Tamannaah Bhatia, Mehreen Pirzada	
Chandramukhi 2		Tamil	2023	2023	Raghava Lawrence, Kangana Ranaut	
Leo		Tamil	2023	2023	Vijay, Trisha Krishnan, Sanjay Dutt, Arjun Sarja	
Iraivan		Tamil	2023	2023	Jayam Ravi, Nayanthara, Rahul Bose, Vinoth Kishan	
Jigarthanda DoubleX		Tamil	2023	2023	Raghava Lawrence, S. J. Surya	Distributed in Hindi by Pen India Limited.
Paavada		Malayalam	2016	2023	Prithviraj Sukumaran, Anoop Menon	
Japan		Tamil	2023	2023	Karthi, Anu Emmanuel	
Captain Miller		Tamil	2024	2024	Dhanush, Priyanka Arul Mohan, Shiva Rajkumar, Sundeep Kishan	
Maharshi		Telugu	2019	2024	Mahesh Babu, Pooja Hegde, Allari Naresh, Prakash Raj, Jayasudha	
Agent		Telugu	2023	2024	Akhil Akkineni, Mammootty, Dino Morea, Sakshi Vaidya, Vikramjeet Virk	
Natasaarvabhowma	Rebel 2	Kannada	2019	2024	Puneeth Rajkumar, Anupama Parameswaran, Rachita Ram	
Sulthan		Tamil	2021	2025	Karthi, Rashmika Mandanna, Ramachandra Raju	
Sivappu Manjal Pachai	Do Khiladi	Tamil	2019	2025	Siddharth, G. V. Prakash Kumar, Lijomol Jose, Kashmira Pardeshi	
My Dear Bootham		Tamil	2022	2025	Prabhu Deva, Ashwanth Ashokkumar, Remya Nambeesan	
Uppena		Tamil	2021	2025	Panja Vaisshnav Tej, Krithi Shetty, Vijay Sethupathi	
Rangasthalam		Telugu	2018	2025	Ram Charan, Samantha Ruth Prabhu, Aadhi Pinisetty, Jagapathi Babu, Prakash Raj	
Kadaram Kondan	2019	Tamil	Vikram, Akshara Haasan, Abi Hassan	2025		
Disco Raja	TBA	Telugu	2020	TBA	Ravi Teja, Payal Rajput, Nabha Natesh, Tanya Hope, Bobby Simha	
Sarkaru Vaari Paata	TBA	Telugu	2022	TBA	Mahesh Babu, Keerthy Suresh, Samuthirakani	
Agilan	TBA	Tamil	2023	TBA	Jayam Ravi, Priya Bhavani Shankar, Hareesh Peradi, Tanya Ravichandran	
Gandeevadhari Arjuna	TBA	Telugu	2023	TBA	Varun Tej, Sakshi Vaidya	
Sarkar	TBA	Tamil	2018	TBA	Vijay, Keerthy Suresh, Abi Hassan	
Kaala Bhairava		Tamil	TBA	TBA	Raghava Lawrence	
Kanchana 4		Tamil	TBA	TBA	Raghava Lawrence, Pooja Hegde	

== Owned channels ==
=== On air channels ===
Channel	Launched	Language	Category	SD/HD availability	Notes
Goldmines	2022	Multilingual	Movies	SD	Replaced Dhinchaak
Goldmines Movies	2023	Multilingual	Movies	SD	Replaced Goldmines Bhojpuri
Goldmines Bollywood	2023	Hindi	Movies	SD	Replaced Dhinchaak 2

=== Defunct channels ===
Channel	Launched	Closed	Language	Category	Notes
Dhinchaak	2020	2022	Multilingual	Movies	Replaced by Goldmines
Dhinchaak 2	2021	2023	Hindi	Movies	Replaced by Goldmines Bollywood
Goldmines Bhojpuri	2022	2023	Bhojpuri	Movies	Replaced by Goldmines Movies
Dhinchaak (relaunch)	2023	2024	Hindi	Movies	Relaunched version; replaced by All Time Movies (owned by Pen Studios)

=== Goldmines ===
Goldmines is an Indian Hindi language television channel owned by Goldmines Telefilms. It was launched as Dhinchaak on 24 May 2020. Within months, it became the highest-rated channel in its genre among Hindi-speaking rural and urban viewers. On 1 April 2022, Dhinchaak TV was renamed to Goldmines. Goldmines broadcasts Hindi, Hindustani, Bhojpuri, and Awadhi dubbed versions of South Indian films produced by the company.

The company also releases Hindi dubbed versions of South Indian films on YouTube on their Goldmines channel. Goldmines YouTube channel crossed 100 million subscribers in September 2024, and is the most subscribed YouTube movie channel and is one of the most-subscribed YouTube channel.

=== Goldmines Bollywood ===
Goldmines Bollywood is an Indian Hindi language movie channel owned by Goldmines Telefilms. It was launched as Dhinchaak 2 on 1 April 2021 and replaced as Goldmines Bollywood on 1 April 2023. The channel primarily airs Bollywood films from the 1960s to the 2000s.

=== Goldmines Movies ===
Goldmines Movies is an Indian multilingual movie channel owned by Goldmines Telefilms. It was launched on 1 April 2023 by replacing Goldmines Bhojpuri and the channel primarily broadcasts South Indian Hindi-Bhojpuri dubbed films.

=== Goldmines Bhojpuri ===
Goldmines Bhojpuri is an Indian Bhojpuri language movie channel owned by Goldmines Telefilms. It was launched on 1 April 2022 and the channel primarily broadcasts Bhojpuri movies and South Indian movies that were dubbed in Bhojpuri language. It was shut down on 1 April 2023 and it was replaced as Goldmines Movies.

== Controversies ==
In 2015, Goldmines faced allegations of colluding with Sony India to inflate film prices for kickbacks, a claim Manish Shah refuted as baseless.

In April 2022, Goldmines has been alleged to threaten the release of dubbed versions of original films on YouTube shortly before the theatrical debut of their official Hindi remakes by other producers. This reportedly pressures remake producers into paying Goldmines to delay or cancel the dubbed releases, thereby avoiding competition, including the Hindi remake of Drishyam 2 (2022), where the film's producers allegedly paid Goldmines approximately ₹3.5 crores to prevent a clash with the dubbed Malayalam original of the same name.

Goldmines Telefilms clashed with Mythri Movie Makers over revenue sharing after the Hindi dubbed Pushpa: The Rise (2021) earned over ₹100 crore, yielding the company a ₹40 crore profit from a ₹30 crore investment. Mythri sought a share of the Hindi profits, but the company refused, citing their dubbing and marketing efforts, leading to a fallout. Consequently, Goldmines was excluded from Pushpa 2: The Rule (2024), with the company opting out over a reported ₹150 crore price disagreement, despite the sequel’s success.

In 2023, T-Series sued Goldmines in the Delhi High Court, alleging copyright infringement over the unauthorized YouTube upload of songs from 14 Bollywood films. T-Series claimed exclusive rights to the songs, while Goldmines argued it had valid rights from film producers. On 1 August 2023, the court issued an interim order barring Goldmines from uploading more content from these films, pending further hearings.
