= Kanchana 3 =

2019 film by Raghava Lawrence

- Theatrical release poster
- Directed by: Raghava Lawrence
- Written by: Raghava Lawrence
- Produced by: Kalanithi Maran; Raghava Lawrence
- Starring: Raghava Lawrence; Oviya; Vedhika; Nikki Tamboli; Ri Djavi Alexandra
- Cinematography: Vetri Palanisamy; Sarvesh Murari
- Edited by: Ruben
- Music by: Songs: DooPaaDoo; Score: S. Thaman
- Production companies: Sun Pictures; Raghavendra Productions
- Distributed by: Sun Pictures
- Release date: 19 April 2019
- Running time: 177 minutes (Theatrical) 162 minutes(Home entertainment)
- Country: India
- Language: Tamil
- Box office: ₹130 crore

Kanchana 3 (also known as Muni 4: Kanchana 3) is a 2019 Indian Tamil-language action comedy horror film co-produced, written and directed by Raghava Lawrence. Produced by Sun Pictures and Raghavendra Productions, and distributed by Sun Pictures, it is the fourth instalment in the Kanchana film series and the third in the Kanchana film series following Kanchana 2 (2015). The film features Raghava Lawrence in dual roles, Oviya, Vedhika, Nikki Tamboli, Ri Djavi Alexandra, Kovai Sarala, Soori, Tarun Arora, and Kabir Duhan Singh. In the film, a young man who gets easily scared is possessed by a ghost that is seeking revenge against a prominent minister.

The film began production during October 2018 and released on 19 April 2019. Later, the film was dubbed in Hindi as K3: Kaali Ka Karishma. The fifth installment in this series, Kanchana 4 written and directed by Raghava, and stars Pooja Hegde and Nora Fatehi in the lead roles is in production.

== Plot ==
A businessman asks his friend to resolve his daughter's problem. His friend asks him to take him to the nearby Lord Narasimha temple. So, the businessman's family takes her to the nearby temple. She breaks the car and runs home. He becomes scared, and they call two Russian exorcist to evict the spirit from their daughter. They successfully evict the violent spirit and hammer it into a tree with two metal nail crosses.

Raghava, a ghost-fearing man, lives with his happy family, including his mother, brother, sister-in-law, and niece. They set out for Coimbatore for a family function to celebrate their grandparents' 60th anniversary. On the way to Coimbatore, they stop in a field to picnic. A sudden gust blows, and Raghava manages to pull the metal nail crosses. It twists out of the ground and stays in the picnic basket. During the function, the whole family, including Raghava's female cousins Priya, Kavya, and Divya, witnessed strange and scary incidents during the day and night at their grandparents' house. They visit a Muneeshwaran temple, and the aghori gives them a holy trishula to plant. Later that night, the spirit drags Priya out of the house, and the trishula lands before her. They visit the aghori, and he gives them three scary dolls to prove if there is a ghost, ghoul, or vengeful vampire. They send Raghava, his female cousins and his grandparents to hand out posters while they conduct the rituals.

While conducting the first ritual, a black horse smashes through the house and drags Raghava's brother. During the second ritual, a herd of bulls enters the house and scares Raghava's family. They nail and rip the doll's head off in the final ritual. Raghava's family exits the house. The ghost eats the head and scares them. The aghori goes to their home and seemingly catches the spirit. Raghava, Priya, Kavya, and Divya return. One night, Priya kisses Raghava, and the ghost possesses him after he looks inside the picnic basket. The following night, the girls witness Raghava behaving effeminately, wearing heels, lipstick, and mascara on his eyelashes. That same night, the possessed Raghava brutally stabs Shankar's assistant and slaps Raghava's brother and sister-in-law.

The possessed Raghava reveals his violent spirit after his female cousins hug and flirt with him. He beats up Raghava's cousins and family. Raghava's grandparents return home, and Raghava's mother tells him that two spirits, a male and a female, have possessed Raghava. Raghava's grandfather calls the aghori. The aghori returns to their home and tells them he lied for a good cause. He reveals Kaali's flashback.

Past: Kaali is a social worker who followed in his late mother's footsteps. He runs an ashram that gives shelter and food to the underprivileged and has also contributed to the studies of aspiring youths. One day, a rowdy named Bhavani, the younger brother of a minister called Shankar, enters Kaali's ashram. He asks to keep a sum of black money worth ₹100 crores in his ashram. He tells him that he should return ₹80 crores and keep ₹20 crores as a source of funding for his ashram.

However, Kaali refuses his black money, which angers Bhavani. He leads his associates to kill one of Kaali's physically disabled innocents. Enraged, Kaali kills Dheena, the man who murdered the disabled boy. Then he murders 'Royapuram' Murthy, Bhavani's right-hand man, and finally Bhavani, brutally stabbing him. He gains the support of his people after Bhavani's murder. After learning this, Shankar and his assistant devise a plan to kill Kaali. When Rosie and Kaali take a romantic ride on a bike, Shankar orchestrates a road accident. Rosie dies on the spot, and Kaali dies after watching the video of his ashram, the Radhaamma ashram, and his innocent supporters getting destroyed in a fire accident orchestrated by Shankar.

Present: The possessed Raghava sets out to kill Shankar. However, Shankar has already arranged for Russian exorcists to crush Kaali. After Goddess Kali enters Kaali, Kaali surpasses the exorcists and kills Shankar, thus avenging his and Rosie's deaths. Kaali and Rosie safely return Raghava to his family and leave.

== Cast ==
- Raghava Lawrence in a dual role as
  - Raghava, a ghost-fearing man
  - Kaali, a caring social worker
- Oviya as Kavya, Raghava's cousin
- Vedhika as Priya, Raghava's cousin
- Nikki Tamboli as Divya, Raghava's cousin
- Alexandra Ri-Djavi as Rosie, Kaali's love interest (girlfriend)
- Kovai Sarala as Raghava's mother
- Devadarshini as Kamakshi, Raghava's sister-in-law
- Soori as Govindan, Kaali's friend
- Sriman as Raghava's brother
- Delhi Ganesh as Raghava's grandfather
- Tarun Arora as Minister Shankar
- Kabir Duhan Singh as Bhavani, Shankar's younger brother
- Anupama Kumar as Radha, Kaali's mother
- Yuvasri Lakshmi as Pappa, Raghava's niece
- Bhanu Balasubramaniam as Raghava's grandmother
- Aathma Patrick as 'Royapuram' Murthy
- Sai Dheena as Dheena
- Myna Nandhini as Durga
- Sunita Gogoi as Dhivya
- Priyanka Nalkari as Moshika, Dhivya's sister
- Ashok Pandian as Dhivya and Moshika's father
- Meerabi as Dhivya and Moshika's mother
- R. N. R. Manohar as Shankar's assistant
- Sampath Ram as Aghori
- Ajay Ghosh as A. Natarajan, a corrupt cop
- Gabrella Sellus as a slum resident

== Production ==
Following the success of Kanchana 2 (2015), Raghava Lawrence confirmed that more films in the horror comedy series would continue to be made. In August 2015, he announced a film titled Naaga, which he would direct himself, and the film was widely reported to be the fourth film in the Muni series. He subsequently moved on to work on two other films, Motta Shiva Ketta Shiva (2017) and Shivalinga (2017).

Lawrence revived the project in August 2017 and revealed that he was finishing the script. The regular supporting cast of Kovai Sarala, Manobala, Sriman and Devadarshini were retained. Sun Pictures, who had recently produced who had previously produced Enthiran (2010), agreed to produce their film, marking their second production. In late September, the following actresses were added to the project: Oviya, following her popularity on the Tamil reality show Bigg Boss, Vedhika from the first film, and newcomer Nikki Tamboli.

The shoot of the film began in Chennai during the first week of October 2017. Nivetha Joseph was the costume designer for this film. The movie was released on Good Friday in 2019.

== Music ==
Raghava Lawrence selected Anirudh Ravichander to compose the music to this film. When he was unable to compose the music for this film, Lawrence signed a deal with DooPaaDoo.com which is owned by lyricist Madhan Karky. It was revealed that the film will have songs from six independent music directors throughout the DooPaaDoo.com platform, but later Raghava Lawrence unilaterally changed his stance to engage Saravedi Saran with 2 of the film's songs, while other songs will be composed by Sekar Sai Bharath, Jessie Samuel (who earlier sung one of the songs in the film Jarugandi), Bharath Madhusuthanan and the Sri Lankan duo of Raj Thillaiyampalam-Kapilan Kugavel. The background music was composed by Thaman, who earlier composed for director's previous Kanchana and Kanchana 2 film.

Muni 4: Kanchana 3

Soundtrack album by Saravedi Saran, Sekar Sai Bharath, Raj Thillaiyampalam, Kapilan Kugavel, Jessie Samuel and Bharath Madhusuthanan
- Released: 2019
- Recorded: 2019
- Language: Tamil
- Labels: DooPaaDoo.com; Divo

Tracklist
No.	Title	Lyrics	Music	Singer(s)	Length
1.	"Nanbanukku Kovila kattu"	Madhan Karky	Saravedi Saran	Saravedi Saran	4:40
2.	"Kadhal-Oru-Vizhiyil"	Madhan Karky	Raj Thillaiyampalam, Kapilan Kugavel	Neha Venugopal	4:07
3.	"Ketta payan sir Kaali"	Madhan Karky	Sekar Sai Bharath	Dhivagaran Santhosh	4:03
4.	"Oru Sattai Oru Balpam"	Saravedi Saran	Saravedi Saran	Saravedi Saran, Srinidhi Sriprakash	3:28
5.	"Shake Your Body"	Jesse Samuel	Jesse Samuel	Jesse Samuel	3:46
6.	"Rudhra Kaali"		Bharath Madhusuthanan	Deepak, Renjith Unni, Pavan, Velu	4:06
Total length:					24:10

== Reception ==
Despite mixed reviews, Kanchana 3 performed well at the box office. The film received mixed reviews from audiences, with comparisons made between Kanchana & Kanchana 2. The dubbed Kannada version titled with the same name, and was panned by critics.

Film Companion South wrote, "In theory, I am a fan of mixing humor and horror. I just wish they worked more on the writing. I can live with the non-existent craft in these films, but is it too much to ask a horror-comedy to have some quality horror and some quality comedy?"

== Release ==
The movie was released on 19 April 2019.

== Sequel ==
The fifth and final installment in this series, Kanchana 4 written and directed by Raghava, and stars Pooja Hegde and Nora Fatehi in the lead roles is in production. The film was officially announced in April 2019, coinciding with the theatrical success of Kanchana 3. Production was reportedly set to begin in 2020, but was delayed due to the COVID-19 pandemic and Lawrence's acting commitments. Principal photography commenced on 23 January 2025 in Chennai and is produced by Goldmines Telefilms.
