= Muni (film) =

2007 Indian film by Raghava Lawrence

- Promotional poster
- Directed by: Raghava Lawrence
- Written by: Ramesh Khanna (dialogues)
- Screenplay by: Raghava Lawrence
- Story by: Raghava Lawrence
- Produced by: Saran
- Starring: Rajkiran; Raghava Lawrence; Vedhika
- Cinematography: K. V. Guhan
- Edited by: Suresh Urs
- Music by: Original songs: Bharadwaj; Background Score: S. P. Venkatesh
- Production company: Gemini Productions
- Release date: 9 March 2007
- Running time: 153 minutes
- Country: India
- Language: Tamil

Muni (transl. Sage) (Note: Also the title character.) is a 2007 Indian Tamil-language comedy horror film directed by Raghava Lawrence and produced by Gemini Productions. The film stars Rajkiran, Lawrence and Vedhika. Nassar, Vinu Chakravarthy, Delhi Ganesh, Kadhal Dhandapani and Kovai Sarala play supporting roles. It follows Ganesh, a man with phasmophobia, who gets possessed by the title character, who seeks revenge against an MLA who killed him.

Muni was released on 9 March 2007 and became a box office success. It is the first instalment in the Kanchana film series, and a spiritual successor, Kanchana, was released in 2011.

== Plot ==
Ganesh, a man with phasmophobia who refuses to go out after 6 PM, moves into a new house with his mother, father, and wife Priya. All of a sudden, Ganesh is possessed by a ghost and starts behaving in a rude manner; his family cannot understand his behaviour, so they seek the help of a priest named Andaiyar. Andaiyar asks the ghost about his past. The ghost says that he is Muniyaandi and starts revealing his flashback.

Muni was a kindhearted but poor man living in the slums with his daughter. His friend is MLA Marakka Dhandapani, who uses Muni to win local elections and promises that he would give lands to the poor villagers. Dhandapani wins the election but cheats on Muni. Muni fights with Dhandapani, who kills Muni and his daughter. Dhandapani lies to the poor people by saying that Muni and his daughter fled with the money that he had given Muni for the welfare of the villagers.

After hearing Muni's story Ganesh feels sorry for him and decides to help him, Ganesh requests Andaiyar to lie to his family that the ghost has left and andaiyar agrees. Ganesh now possessed by Muni manages to get a job as a bodyguard for Dhandapani's daughter but after he brutally kills Dhandapani's brother Dhandapani finds out that Ganesh is Muni and hires an exorcist named Mastaan Bhai to save himself. Bhai captures Muni and bargains with him, who agrees to let Dhandapani go if he repents and helps the poor villagers. In the climax, at Ayyanaar temple, Dhandapani confesses to the people that he killed Muni and his daughter. He then leaves money with the villagers. Muni talks with the people and eats the feast prepared by them. Bhai tells Muni to leave Ganesh's body, and he does. However, Dhandapani lied and was planning to get back all his money from the villagers. Ganesh, upon hearing this, kills Dhandapani. Bhai sees this act but does nothing, as he finally sees the injustice done by Dhandapani.

== Cast ==
- Rajkiran as Muniyandi "Muni"
- Raghava Lawrence as Ganesh
- Vedhika as Priya Ganesh
- Nassar as Andaiyar
- Vinu Chakravarthy as Kandasamy
- Delhi Ganesh as Priya's father
- Kadhal Dhandapani as MLA Dhandapani
- Kovai Sarala as Kannamma
- Bala Singh
- Rahul Dev as Mastan Bhai
- Vadivelu David as Murugesan
- Scissor Manohar as House Broker
- Kallukkul Eeram Ramanathan
- Pudhupettai Suresh as Dhandapani's Brother
- Meera Krishnan as Priya's mother
- Asha
- Kavya
- Neelima Naidu as Chandramukhi

== Production ==
Muni is the second film produced by Saran via Gemini Productions after Aaru (2005). The film was launched with a puja at AVM Studios in late June 2006. In early January 2007, a song sequence was shot before a 40 feet (12 m) tall idol of Muneeswarar.

== Soundtrack ==
The soundtrack was composed by Bharadwaj.

Track listing
No.	Title	Lyrics	Singer(s)	Length
1.	"Assah Pussah"	Pa. Vijay	Karthik, Priya Himesh	4:16
2.	"Suru Suru Susuravarthi"	Raghava Lawrence	Ranjith, Anuradha Sriram	4:18
3.	"Gulla Gulla Dracula"	Pa. Vijay	Bharadwaj	4:23
4.	"Thalai Suthuthey Mami" (Version 1)	Raghava Lawrence	Bharadwaj, Kavitha	4:50
5.	"Varranda Muni"	Pa. Vijay	Mukesh	3:53
6.	"Thalai Suthuthey Mami" (Version 2)	Raghava Lawrence	Raghava Lawrence	4:10
Total length:				25:50

== Critical reception ==
Sify wrote, "On the whole, Muni does not make for great horror film. At best it provides some funny comedy time!!". Malini Mannath of Chennai Online wrote "Lawrence's Telugu ventures were better crafted and presented. He hasn't revealed even half that potential here. Again, the attempt to blend comedy with the supernatural doesn't quite work out here. For, the film neither makes you laugh nor takes you to the edge of your seat. Minus it's [sic] gore and violence, 'Muni' at most could have turned out to be enjoyable fare for children!". Lajjavathi of Kalki praised the acting of Rajkiran and Lawrence and other actors, Bharadwaj's music and Ramesh Khanna's dialogues and called the film as comedy express. Sriram Iyer of Rediff.com wrote, "Though the first half of the movie seems frivolous, it has, nevertheless contributed to building up the plot, which takes a serious turn in the second half where it ceases to be scary". Malathi Rangarajan of The Hindu wrote, "Muni exemplifies the multifarious skills of Raghava Lawrence. The only snag is he tries to showcase all of them at the same time. The choreographer, in particular, often tries to overtake the director, and in the process treatment suffers".

== Sequels ==
The success of the film spawned three spiritual successors: Kanchana (2011), Kanchana 2 (2015) and Kanchana 3 (2019).
