= Tar Tay Gyi =

2017 Burmese comedy horror film

- Theatrical poster
- Burmese: တာတေကြီး
- Directed by: Wyne
- Screenplay by: Thiha Soe
- Starring: Nay Toe; Shwe Thamee
- Production company: Lu Swan Kaung
- Release date: 24 November 2017
- Running time: 120 minutes
- Country: Myanmar
- Language: Burmese

Tar Tay Gyi (Burmese: တာတေကြီး), is a 2017 Burmese comedy horror film starring Nay Toe and Shwe Thamee. The film produced by Lu Swan Kaung Production premiered in Myanmar on November 24, 2017. The film is an unofficial remake of the 2011 Indian Tamil-language film Muni 2: Kanchana.

The film revolves around Ye Khaung, who is scared to venture outside gets possessed by a ghost and starts behaving weirdly. The film's direction was handled by Wyne.

== Synopsis ==
Ye Khaung, who was cowardly afraid of ghosts, later encountered an unknown spirit from the grounds of an old abandoned house. He was possessed by three ghosts from a previous life, who troubled his family. During the exorcism, the ghosts surrendered and revealed their miserable lives after being cast away by their father for being gay. They sought vengeance for the death of their family.

== Cast ==
- Nay Toe as
  - Ye Khaung
  - (Possessed) Tar Tar
- Shwe Thamee as Nandar
- Aung Min as Ye Khaung's brother in law
- Zaw Oo as head exorcist master
- Than Myaing
- Ko Ko Oo
- Ant Min Lu

== Award ==
Year	Award	Category	Nominee	Result
2017	Myanmar Motion Picture Academy Awards	Best Actor	Nay Toe	Won
