= Kalpana (2012 film) =

2012 film by Rama Narayanan

- Theatrical release poster
- Directed by: Rama Narayanan
- Written by: Raghava Lawrence
- Based on: Kanchana
- Produced by: Sri Thenandal Films
- Starring: Upendra; Saikumar; Lakshmi Rai
- Cinematography: K. S. Selvaraj
- Edited by: Raj Keerthy
- Music by: V. Harikrishna
- Production company: Sri Thenandal Films
- Release date: 28 September 2012
- Running time: 163 minutes
- Country: India
- Language: Kannada
- Budget: ₹7 crore
- Box office: ₹11 crore

Kalpana is a 2012 Indian Kannada-language comedy horror film directed by Rama Narayanan and starring Upendra, Saikumar and Lakshmi Rai in the lead roles. The film is produced under the banner of Sri Thenandal Films and is a remake of the 2011 Tamil film Kanchana. Saikumar reprises the role of a transgender Kalpana, originally played by Sarath Kumar in the Tamil version. Shruti and Umashri play supporting roles originally played by Devadarshini and Kovai Sarala.

The film was released across Karnataka on 28 September 2012 and opened to positive response from critics and audiences. The performances of Sai Kumar and Upendra have been critically acclaimed. The film did well at the box office and was a 'Super Hit' in Mysore, Northern Karnataka, Chitradurga, Bellary districts, while a 'Hit' in other parts of Karnataka. Kalpana was the Sixth Highest Grossing Kannada film of 2012. Upendra won the Udaya Film Award for Best Male Actor for his performance in the film.

A sequel to the film was made and titled as Kalpana 2 which is a remake of Tamil film Kanchana 2.

It was dubbed in Hindi as Bhagmati and released in 2017.

== Plot ==
Raghava (Upendra) is a typical jobless youth who spends his days playing cricket with friends. He suffers from an irrational fear of ghosts, and retreats to the safety of his home after sunset. So great is his fear, that he prefers to sleep with his mother (Umashri) and have her accompany him to the bathroom at night. This creates major annoyance in the household, including Raghava's brother (Achyuth Kumar), sister-in-law (Shruti), and their children.

One day, Raghava and his friends are forced to abandon their usual cricket ground and find a new one; they unwittingly select an abandoned land that is rumored to be haunted. A bizarre weather change scares them away. Raghava brings home his cricket stumps, which have been stained with blood from a buried corpse in the ground. He focuses on wooing Priya (Lakshmi Rai), the sister of his sister-in-law. In the following days, his mother and sister-in-law are witnesses to several paranormal phenomena at night; prominently a ghost haunting the hallways. On consulting a priest, they perform 3 rituals to ascertain if the house is haunted:

1. They keep a coconut on a rangoli and pray to Lord Shiva. The coconut rotates on its own.

2. They make a cow eat food. The cow runs out of the house without eating the food.

3. They leave a lit lamp and two drops of blood and leave the house. A ghost of a woman appears before them and licks the blood.

Scared senseless, Raghava's mother and sister-in-law hire two priests (Om Prakash Rao and Bullet Prakash) to rid their home of the ghost. The priests, however, are conmen and escape with their lives. That night, the ghost possesses Raghava, who begins acting increasingly effeminate, alienating himself from Priya and wearing women's clothes and jewelry. His family angrily confronts him, when it is revealed that there are three ghosts who have possessed him: a violent woman, a Hindi-speaking Muslim, and an intellectually disabled boy. Raghava's family hires an exorcist, who successfully drives the spirit away from Raghava's body. The ghost of the woman, trapped, reveals her story.

Kalpana (Sai Kumar Pudipeddi) is a transgender woman who was disowned by her parents. She is offered shelter by a kind Muslim Akbar Bai (Babu Antony), who has an intellectually disabled son. Regretting that she couldn't become a doctor as she intended, she adopts another young transgender, Geetha, and works hard to support her financially. When Geetha leaves to study medicine abroad, Kalpana buys a plot of land where Geetha intended to construct a hospital for the poor. That ground is unlawfully taken by crooked MLA Shankar. Kalpana angrily confronts the MLA, who cunningly kills her. He also kills Akbar bai and his son. Before she died, she vowed to kill Shankar, his wife, and his henchmen. The bodies are then buried in Kalpana's ground.

The exorcist sympathizes with her but remains duty-bound and traps her. After hearing her story, Raghava is touched; risking the danger, he allows Kalpana to possess him once again. Raghava/Kalpana confronts the MLA and disposes of his henchmen gruesomely. The MLA seeks refuge in a Narasimha temple which Kalpana is forbidden from, but she asks the deity for justice and manages to chase him inside the temple. The three spirits combined kill the MLA. A few years later, Raghava constructed the hospital for Geetha as per Kalpana's wishes. The movie ends with Priya shouting "deva" (ghost in Kannada) and a terrified Raghava sitting on her hip.

== Cast ==
- Upendra as Raghava aka Kalpana
- P. Sai Kumar as Kalpana
- Lakshmi Rai as Priya
- Shruti as Jaanki
- Umashree as Raghava's mother
- Sathyajith as Muslim exorcist
- Shobaraj as MLA Shankar
- Babu Antony as Akbar Bhai
- Achyuth Kumar as Jaanki's husband
- Om Prakash Rao as fake priest
- Bullet Prakash as fake priest

== Production ==
The film was launched on 14 December at the Kanteerava Studios in Bangalore. 95% of the filming occurred in Chennai, similar to the original version but some portions were significantly shot in and around Mangalore. Upendra brought his family, as it was his wedding anniversary. He and his wife, actress Priyanka Upendra, exchanged garlands in front of hundreds of fans and film industry dignitaries. Lakshmi Rai, the female lead in the original film, played in the same role opposite Upendra in this film. Sai Kumar was cast as Sarath Kumar's replacement and played a transgender role. Umashri, Shruti and Achyuth Kumar were also cast in supporting roles in the movie. Actor Shobaraj plays the main villain, which was originally portrayed by Devan in Tamil Version.

== Music ==
The music for the film was composed by V. Harikrishna. All the tunes from the original Tamil film were retained.

All music is composed by V. Harikrishna.

No.	Title	Singer(s)	Length
1.	"Nillu Maga Nillu Maga"	Shankar Mahadevan
2.	"Bayanno Bambada"	Lakshmi Vijay, V. Harikrishna
3.	"Hei Madana Kamaraya"	Chetan, Shamitha Malnad
4.	"Bandhelu Bandhelu"	V. Harikrishna, Priyadarshini

== Reception ==
=== Critical response ===
Kalpana opened to generally favorable reviews from the critics. The performances of Kumar and Upendra were critically acclaimed. A critic from The Times of India scored the film at 3 out of 5 stars and says "Full marks to Saikumar for his excellent portrayal of a Mangalamukhi. Upendra shines as a man possessed. But Umashri’s sole is completely spoilt by overacting and shouting. Shruthi is sober. Harikrishna’s music fails to impress. Cinematography by KS Selvaraj is impressive". A critic from Bangalore Mirror wrote "The opportunity comes mostly in a couple of songs. Music composer V Harikrishna seems to be burdened with composing for a remake. The tunes are good enough for the film. The film is a complete entertainer and a full value for money. Unfortunately, you cannot take kids to this one". Y Maheswara Reddy from Deccan Herald wrote "Meanwhile, Raghava starts behaving like a girl and becomes aggressive. At this juncture the story takes a twist bringing Kalpana into the picture. Who is Kalpana? Simply put, this is an interesting movie — go watch it for some fun!". A critic from News18 India wrote "Ramnarayan is known for this kind of films- God and Ghost battle with human beings. He continues in the same speed and zeal in 'Kalpana'". B S Srivani from Deccan Herald wrote "Background score is impressive, but the songs, coming from Harikrishna, are disappointing.Kalpana is for Uppi’s fans and for those who keep hiding their fears under jokes". Srikanth Srinivasa from Rediff.com scored the film at 3 out of 5 stars and says "Lakshmi Rai has limited scope. Saikumar, who enacts the part of a transgender, surprises with his superb body language and dialogue delivery. The music by Harikrishna is adequate. If you like horror films you may like this". A critic from India Today wrote "The editing could have been sharper. Hari Krishna, who has set a benchmark with his music compositions in recent films, has however, gone a step below". A critic from Zee News wrote "However, the negative part of the film is that post interval, until the entry of Sai Kumars character, the film moves at a slow pace. Lakshmi Rai has little opportunity in the film and is just seen in song sequences and a few not-so-well written sequences. If you look in totality, "Kalpana" is one thoroughly enjoyable film".

== Box office ==
Kalpana had a good opening at the box office across Karnataka. The film opened to 90% occupancy at single screens and around 70% occupancy at multiplexes. The film grossed ₹4 crore during its opening weekend and collected a net share of ₹2.5 crore, thus surpassing the openings of Upendra's previous film Godfather, which had grossed ₹3 crore during its opening weekend. The film grossed more than ₹11 crore at the box office and completed 50 days of run in 25 centres across Karnataka. Kalpana was the sixth highest grossing Kannada film of 2012.
