= Kanchana (2011 film) =

2011 Indian film by Raghava Lawrence

- Theatrical release poster
- Directed by: Raghava Lawrence
- Written by: Raghava Lawrence
- Produced by: Raghava Lawrence; N. Radha
- Starring: Raghava Lawrence; R. Sarathkumar; Devan; Babu Antony; Lakshmi Rai; Kovai Sarala
- Cinematography: Vetri Palanisamy; E. Krishnasamy
- Edited by: Kishore Te.
- Music by: Thaman S
- Production companies: Sri Thenandal Films; Raghavendra Productions
- Distributed by: Sri Thenandal Films
- Release date: 15 July 2011
- Running time: 171 minutes
- Country: India
- Language: Tamil
- Budget: ₹7 crore

Kanchana (also known as Muni 2: Kanchana) is a 2011 Indian Tamil-language horror comedy film written and directed by Raghava Lawrence, with produced by N. Radha, under the banner of Sri Thenandal Films, and co produced by Raghava Lawrence under Raghavendra Productions. It is a sequel to his previous venture, Muni (2007) and the second instalment in the Kanchana film series. The film stars him as the main hero and R. Sarathkumar as Kanchana. Devan, Babu Antony, Lakshmi Rai, Kovai Sarala, Devadarshini, Sriman and others play supporting roles. The film revolves around Raghava, who is scared to venture outside but gets possessed by a ghost and starts behaving weirdly.

The film's cinematography and editing were handled by Vetri and Kishore Te, respectively. The film's soundtrack was composed by S. Thaman. The film's distribution rights were bought by Sri Thenandal Films.

Kanchana was released on 22 July 2011 while a same-titled Telugu dubbed version was released a week earlier on 15 July 2011. The film became a commercial success in both languages and has been remade in several languages.

== Plot ==
Raghava, an unemployed youth, has developed phasmophobia and refuses to step out of his house after sunset, chooses to sleep in his mother's room, and forces her to accompany him to the restroom at night. His antics disrupt the peace of his family, which includes his widowed mother, Vatsala, his elder brother Prasad, the latter's wife Kamakshi, and their children. Raghava and his companions, who usually play cricket, are compelled to search for another location as construction is planned to take place, and unwittingly choose an abandoned area believed to be haunted.

While they begin setting up the cricket pitch, a peculiar weather change causes them to return home. Raghava does not notice that his cricket stumps are stained with blood after piercing buried corpses. Raghava woos Kamakshi's younger sister Priya, who has come to stay with them, while Vatsala and Kamakshi become panic-stricken by perpetual supernatural occurrences at their residence. Hiding it from their family, Vatsala and Kamakshi consult a priest, who suggests three rituals to test the presence of a spirit. Raghava, Priya, and the kids get sent to Kamakshi's maternal home to check on Kamakshi's ill father, a lie told to prevent Raghava from obstructing the rituals. Vatsala and Kamakshi's suspicions turn out to be true after they perform the rituals. To chase the ghost away, they hire two priests, who ask them to stay outside the house while they try to capture it. However, they are con men who mislead Vatsala and Kamakshi into believing that they have seized the ghost, and they get paid. Raghava, Priya, and the kids return home the next day. On the same night, the spirit possesses Raghava.

From the succeeding day, Raghava begins to act effeminate and detaches himself from Priya. While in a shopping complex with his mother and sister-in-law, Raghava continues to act unmanly and wears a sari and women's jewellery, embarrassing Vatsala, who slaps him. Raghava strangles a woman, Madhavi, to death and later disposes of her corpse, unbeknownst to anyone. Kamakshi, that night, witnesses Raghava wearing her bangles and eventually exposes his womanish acts to Prasad, and the family confronts him. Then, the family discovers that Raghava is possessed by three spirits: a woman, an Urdu-speaking Muslim, and an autistic man. Frightened, the family approaches a Muslim exorcist, who drives the spirit away from Raghava and forces the spirit to reveal who she is. The woman discloses herself as a transgender woman, Kanchana, who reveals her past.

Past: As a child, Karthik was disowned by her parents when they discovered that she was a trans woman. A Muslim named Akbar Bhai, who had an autistic son, adopted Karthik. He sympathised with Karthik, gave her refuge and renamed her Kanchana. Regretting that she could not become a doctor due to her struggles, Kanchana slogged to have her adopted daughter, Geetha, another trans woman, pursue her medical studies. Geetha eventually secured a scholarship and was sent abroad for post-graduation, while Kanchana bought a plot of land, intending to build a hospital for the poor. However, the plot of land had been unlawfully seized by an MLA named Shankar for his love interest, Madhavi. When Kanchana and Akbar confronted Shankar, he murdered them and tricked Akbar's son into committing suicide. He then proceeded to bury them on Kanchana's plot of land.

Present: After hearing Kanchana's story, the exorcist sympathises with her but, bound by his responsibility, seals her inside a protected container and secures Raghava with an amulet. Raghava realises that Kanchana has been doing this for a good cause. He removes his amulet and allows her to possess him. Raghava/Kanchana fights Shankar and his henchmen, but Shankar seeks refuge in a Narasimha temple, which spirits cannot enter. Kanchana prays to the god to let her enter his temple so she can kill Shankar for justice. She enters the temple and kills Shankar outside of the temple.

A few years later, Raghava, Priya, and the family take part in the inauguration ceremony of the hospital, which was built on the plot of land as per Kanchana's wishes. A few local goons come to threaten them for money. Kanchana, shown to still exist within Raghava, emerges to fight them.

== Cast ==
- Raghava Lawrence as Raghava
- R. Sarathkumar as Karthik alias Kanchana
- Devan as MLA Shankar, the main antagonist
- Padma Narayanan as wife of MLA Shankar,Murderer of Kanchana (cameo appearance)
- Lakshmi Rai as Priya, Raghava's girlfriend and Kamakshi's younger sister
- Kovai Sarala as Vatsala, Raghava's mother
- Devadarshini as Kamakshi, Raghava's sister-in-law and Priya's elder sister
- Sriman as Prasad, Raghava's elder brother and Kamakshi's husband
- Babu Antony as Akbar Bhai
- Priya as Krishnan alias "Geetha"
  - Sarvesh Rao as young Geetha
- Manobala as fake priest
- Mayilsamy as fake priest
- Minnal Deepa as Muslim Priest's daughter
- Boys Rajan as School Head Master
- Munnar Ramesh as Manickam, Karthik's father
- Sampath Ram as Raja, Kanchana's stabber
- Jasper as Muslim Priest
- Rangammal

== Soundtrack ==
The soundtrack was composed by S. Thaman.

Track listing
No.	Title	Lyrics	Singer(s)	Length
1.	"Nillu Nillu Nillu Nillu"	Raghava Lawrence	Tippu	4:58
2.	"Sangili Bungili"	Viveka	Velmurugan	3:56
3.	"Karuppu Perazaga"	Viveka	Suchith Suresan, Darshana KT	5:00
4.	"Kodiavanin Kadhaya"	Viveka	Sriram, M. L. R. Karthikeyan, and Malathy Lakshman	4:19
Total length:				18:13

== Reception ==
=== Critical response ===
Radhika Rajamani of Rediff.com wrote "It is torturous and tedious to watch, the chills and thrills are not spine-chilling and a soundtrack that is supposed to be eerie is anything but. There's quite a bit of unintended comedy too". Sify wrote, "On the whole, Kanchana is an entertaining affair and can be watched once". Y. Sunita Chowdhary of The Hindu wrote, "The film is awkwardly cobbled together with big shifts in character that comes with an explanation only in the last 20 minutes of the film. The character of the transvestite is more based on wishful thinking than plausible reality".

=== Box office ===
According to Sify, Kanchana emerged 2011's most successful Tamil film based on return on investment. The film, made on a budget of ₹7 crore (US$730,000) and marketed for ₹1.5 crore (US$160,000), had its Telugu dubbing rights sold to Bellamkonda Suresh for ₹4 crore (US$420,000). The film was expected to gross ₹15 to 20 crore share from Tamil Nadu alone at the end of its run.

== Accolades ==
Event	Category	Nominee(s)	Verdict	Ref.
Tamil Nadu State Film Awards	Best Choreographer	Raghava Lawrence	Won	
Tamil Nadu State Film Awards	Best Comedian (Female)	Devadarshini	Won	
6th Vijay Awards	Best Supporting Actor	R. Sarathkumar	Won	
6th Vijay Awards	Best Female Comedian	Kovai Sarala	Won	
1st South Indian International Movie Awards	Best Actor in a Supporting Role	R. Sarathkumar	Won	

== Sequels and remakes ==
The third instalment in the Muni series, titled Kanchana 2 was released in 2015, and the fourth instalment Kanchana 3 in 2019. Kanchana was remade in Kannada as Kalpana (2012). Lawrence himself directed the Hindi remake titled Laxmii (2020). In 2016 the Sri Lankan remake Maya was released. It was unofficially remade in Burmese as Tar Tay Gyi (2017). In 2017, the Bangladeshi remake was released, titled Mayabini.

== Legacy ==
The song "Sangili Bungili Kadhava Thorae" inspired the title of a 2017 film.

== See also ==
- List of Indian horror films
- List of ghost films
