= Thipparaa Meesam =

2019 Indian Telugu-language film directed by Krishna Vijay

- Theatrical Release Poster
- Directed by: Krishna Vijay
- Written by: Krishna Vijay
- Produced by: Rizwan
- Starring: Sree Vishnu; Nikki Tamboli
- Cinematography: Siddharth J.
- Edited by: Dharmendra Kakarala
- Music by: Suresh Bobbili
- Production companies: Rizwan Entertainment; Krishna Vijay L Productions
- Distributed by: Shri Om Cinema
- Release date: 8 November 2019
- Running time: 152 minutes
- Country: India
- Language: Telugu

Thipparaa Meesam (transl. Twirl your mustache) is a 2019 Indian Telugu-language suspense thriller film starring Sree Vishnu and Nikki Tamboli with Rohini in an important role.

== Cast ==
- Sree Vishnu as Mani Shankar
- Nikki Tamboli as Mounika
- Rohini as Lalita, Mani's mother
- Bannerjee as Mani's uncle
- Praveen
- Neha Deshpande
- Lahari Shari as Samyukta
- Raghuvaran as Mani's deceased father (photo shown)

== Production ==
Sree Vishnu plays a DJ in the film and grew his mustache and beard out to portray the role. His character has negative shades. The film is directed by Krishna Vijay and Nikki Tamboli and Rohini play the female leads. Neha Deshpande was signed to play a supporting role. The teaser was released in September. Krishna Vijay previously worked with Vishnu in Asura (2015). The first look was released in February and the film was initially scheduled to release in the summer.

The film gained popularity since the film released after the successful Brochevarevarura (2019) starring Vishnu. Thippara Meesam was jointly produced by Rizwan Entertainment and Krishna Vijay L Productions. The trailer was released on 6 November. The theatrical rights for the film were bought by Asian Cinemas. The film released on 8 November.

== Soundtrack ==
The songs were composed by Suresh Bobbili. The first single "Dhethadi Pochammagudi" released in September and the second single "Mouna Hrudaya Ragam" released in October.

No.	Title	Lyrics	Singer(s)	Length
1.	"Dhethadi Pochammagudi"	Purnachary	Suresh Bobbili, Naresh Mamindla	3:27
2.	"Mouna Hrudaya Raagame"	Purnachary	Ranjani	4:05
3.	"Radha Ramanam"	Purnachary	Anurag Kulkarni, Nuthana Mohan	3:53
4.	"Thipparaa Meesam (Title Track)"	Purnachary	Hemachandra, Kranthi Sanjay	3:23
5.	"Trance Song"	Ala Raju	Naresh, Mamindla, Rohith, Nnadhan Raj	3:08
Total length:				17:46

== Release ==
The film received negative reviews from critics. The Times of India gave the film a rating of two out of five stars and wrote that "After watching Thipparaa Meesam, one feels is like Mani in a key scene, wandering around in boxers and broken sunglasses, confused and affronted at the way the story unfolds". The Hindu wrote that "Sree Vishnu and Rohini shoulder a story of strained bonds between a mother and her son".
