= Nikki Tamboli =

Indian actress (born 1996)

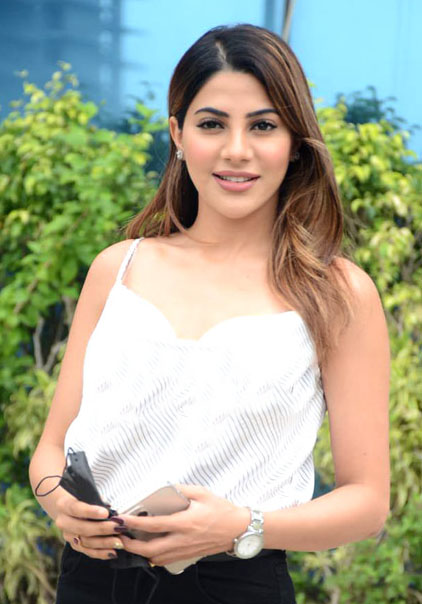
- Tamboli in 2021
- Born: Nikita Tamboli; 21 August 1996 (age 30); Aurangabad, Maharashtra, India
- Occupation: Actress
- Years active: 2019–present
- Partner: Arbaz Patel (2024–present)

Nikki Tamboli (born 21 August 1996) is an Indian actress who primarily works in Telugu, Tamil cinema and Hindi television. She is known for participating in reality shows such as Bigg Boss 14, Fear Factor: Khatron Ke Khiladi 11, Bigg Boss Marathi season 5 and Celebrity MasterChef India.

== Early life ==
Tamboli was born in a Marathi family on 21 August 1996 in Aurangabad, Maharashtra. Her brother Jatin died in 2021 due to COVID-19.

== Career ==
She started her career as a model. In 2019, she made her acting debut with the Telugu horror comedy film Chikati Gadilo Chithakotudu playing the role of Pooja.

Tamboli later made her Tamil debut in the action horror film Kanchana 3 as Divya. Kanchana 3 grossed over ₹130 crore worldwide. Her third film was Thipparaa Meesam in Telugu where she played Mounika.

In 2020, she made her television debut through participating in the Hindi reality show Bigg Boss 14 where she emerged as the 2nd runner-up, and got immense fame and appreciation during her stint on the show.

In 2021, she participated in Colors TV's stunt-based reality show Fear Factor: Khatron Ke Khiladi 11, filmed in Cape Town where she finished at 10th place. Apart from reality shows she was also seen in several music videos collaboration with channels such as T-Series, Saregama and Desi Music Factory.

In 2022, she was seen in Colors TV's game show The Khatra Khatra Show which was hosted by Bharti Singh and Haarsh Limbachiyaa.

In 2023, Tamboli made special appearance in the song "Cocktail" in Hindi film Jogira Sara Ra Ra opposite Nawazuddin Siddiqui.

In 2024, Tamboli appeared on the Colors Marathi's reality show Bigg Boss Marathi Season 5. She was eventually the highest-paid contestant of the season. Tamboli emerged as the 2nd runner-up.

In 2025, Tamboli appeared on the Sony TV's reality show Celebrity Masterchef India where she emerged as the 1st runner-up.

In 2026, Tamboli appeared on the Colors TV's reality show The 50. Tamboli later also appeared on the MX Player's reality show Battleground Season 2 as a mentor of Team Lootere / Team Telugu Tigers.

== In the media ==
Tamboli appeared in the Times of India's "Most Desirable Women on Television" list of 2020, where she was ranked 8th.

== Personal life ==
Tamboli is in a relationship with Arbaz Patel, which they confirmed after meeting in Bigg Boss Marathi season 5.

== Filmography ==
=== Films ===
Year	Title	Role	Language	Ref.
2019	Chikati Gadilo Chithakotudu	Pooja	Telugu	
2019	Kanchana 3	Divya	Tamil	
2019	Thipparaa Meesam	Mounika	Telugu	
2023	Jogira Sara Ra Ra	Item number	Hindi	
2025	Badnaam	Item number	Punjabi	

=== Television ===
Year	Title	Role	Notes
2020–2021	Bigg Boss 14	Contestant	2nd runner-up
2021	Fear Factor: Khatron Ke Khiladi 11	Contestant	10th place
2021	Bigg Boss OTT 1	Herself	
2021	Zee Comedy Show	Herself	
2021	Bigg Boss 15	Herself	
2021	Sirf Tum	Herself	
2022	The Khatra Khatra Show	Herself	
2023	Entertainment Ki Raat Housefull	Herself	
2024	Bigg Boss Marathi 5	Contestant	2nd runner-up
2024	Playground	Herself	
2024	India's Best Dancer 4	Herself	
2025	Indian Idol 15	Herself	
2025	India's Best Dancer vs Super Dancer: Champions ka Tashan	Herself	
2025	Celebrity Masterchef India	Contestant	1st runner-up
2025	Shitti Vajli Re	Herself	
2025	Insider with Faisu	Herself	Guest
2026	The 50	Contestant	
2026	Battleground Season 2	Mentor	Mentor of Team Lootere / Team Telugu Tigers

=== Music videos ===
Year	Title	Singer(s)	Ref.
2021	Birthday Pawri	Amit Mishra and Aditi Singh Sharma	
2021	Kalla Reh Jayenga	Jass Zaildar	
2021	Number Likh	Tony Kakkar	
2021	Shanti	Millind Gaba	
2021	Roko Roko	Mellow D	
2021	Dil Kisi Se	Arjun Kanungo	
2022	Behri Duniya	Afsana Khan and Saajz	
2022	Ek Haseena Ne	Ramji Gulati	
2022	Chhori	Sonu Kakkar	
2025	Bheegne De	Tulsi Kumar	
