= Kanchana 2 =

2015 Indian film by Raghava Lawrence

- Poster
- Directed by: Raghava Lawrence
- Written by: Raghava Lawrence
- Produced by: Raghava Lawrence
- Starring: Raghava Lawrence; Taapsee Pannu; Nithya Menen; Kovai Sarala
- Cinematography: Rajavel Mohan; R. B. Gurudev
- Edited by: Kishore Te.
- Music by: Score: S. Thaman; Songs: Leon James; S. Thaman; C. Sathya; Ashwamithra
- Production company: Raghavendra Productions
- Distributed by: Sun Pictures; Sri Thenandal Films
- Release date: 17 April 2015
- Running time: 163 minutes
- Country: India
- Language: Tamil
- Budget: ₹17–18 crore
- Box office: est. ₹108–120 crore

Kanchana 2 (also known as Muni 3: Kanchana 2) is a 2015 Indian Tamil-language horror comedy film written, produced and directed by Raghava Lawrence, who enactes in dual role and reprises his role. Alongside him, the film stars Taapsee Pannu, Nithya Menen, Renuka, Jayaprakash, Rajendran, Suhasini Maniratnam, Mayilsamy, with Kovai Sarala and Sriman also reprising their roles. It is the third instalment in the Kanchana film series, and is the sequel to Kanchana (2011). The film was remade in Kannada as Kalpana 2 (2016) starring Upendra.

== Plot ==
Raghava is a cameraman for the channel Green TV, where his crush Nandini works. He still has a fear of ghosts and lives with his mother. When Green TV drops to the second position in the ratings, Nandini advises shooting a horror program to bring their channel back to the first position. After the board members agree on this plan, Nandini decides on a location, Mahabalipuram, with a house near a beach with an intensely haunted look, without knowing that the house is haunted. She sets out with her crew: Raghava, his watchman Mayil, the boss's family doctor, Dr Prasad, two lighting technicians, Arnold and Aravind Swamy, and the show's anchor, Pooja, to complete the task.

While shooting on a nearby beach, Nandini discovers a nuptial chain in the sand. After the discovery, mysterious events started taking place. The next day, when the group begins shooting at the house, they see a lunatic in rags running out and become scared. She decides to visit a sorcerer. The priest discovers that the nuptial chain is haunted. He lets Nandini out of his room and returns the chain to the spirit. Nandini does not seem to believe it, and the priest challenges her to check the place where she had taken it. After Nandini and Pooja disturb the nuptial chain for a second time, it beats them up and refuses to leave them. She rushes to the sorcerer and helps her. As instructed by him, she prepares a coffin and a woman's corpse. They dress her like a bride, place Nandini's hair, clothes, and sand inside, and nail it shut. They move to a distance and shoot. They are shocked to see that the coffin splinters open. Subsequently, the dead woman gets dragged by the ghost.

All the members escape out of fear, and Raghava collapses. The priest gets killed, and the ghost possesses Nandini. Nandini talks to the Green TV Head about shifting to a different house. After, Raghava and Nandini move into another dwelling, where the haunted Nandini is planning something. To their surprise, Raghava's mother and Nandini's sister-in-law also came to stay there. Several changes occur in Nandini, which only Raghava notices at first; she starts smoking at night and murmurs, "Shiva, Shiva". The possessed Nandini also beats up Raghava, Raghava's mother, and her sister-in-law. Soon, the family realised that she had become possessed. Nandini (now possessed by Ganga) influences Shiva's ghost to possess Raghava. When Raghava's mother and Nandini's sister-in-law return, they get beaten up. They retreat to a church, and Shiva and Ganga attack the priests. The priests then try to burn them, and they retreat and reveal their flashback.

Past: Ganga is a physically-challenged girl. Ganga organises a wedding and invites her friend Gayathri and her family. When visiting Marudhu with her father, Marudhu's insane son Shankar calls and assaults her. Her wedding gets cancelled after the groom insults her. Ganga forgives Gayathri after Gayathri offended Ganga at a young age. In the shock of the wedding cancellation, Ganga's father committed suicide by hanging himself.

Shiva loves Ganga and gets happy when the wedding gets cancelled. Ganga reveals that she loves Shiva back. Marudhu's brother and his accomplices kidnap Ganga and her friend's family and take them to a wedding hall. Marudhu says that he threatened the groom and stopped the wedding. Also, he wanted Ganga to marry his insane son, Shankar.

Shiva arrives and says to Marudhu that he loves Ganga. Marudhu and Shankar stab Shiva in the back. Shiva murders Shankar by stabbing him. Then Marudhu's brother murders Shiva. Marudhu, in revenge for his son's death, strangles Ganga with the Thali, killing her, and kills Shiva's and Ganga's friend's family. He also made Shiva's best friend insane (Shiva's friend was the lunatic). Marudhu's associates buried them at the beach.

Present: When Raghava (possessed by Shiva) killed Marudhu's brother, Marudhu learns that a spirit killed him and gets a tantrik to revive a dead Shankar to kill Shiva and Ganga. Shiva battles Shankar and eventually defeats him. Ganga takes her revenge by killing Marudhu. Shiva returns Raghava safely to his family and promises to return whenever required. The story of Shiva and Ganga restores Green TV to the first position.

== Cast ==
- Raghava Lawrence in dual role as
  - Raghava
  - Shiva
- Taapsee Pannu as Nandhini (Voice dubbed by Savitha Reddy)
- Nithya Menen as Ganga (Voice dubbed by Ishwarya)
- Kovai Sarala as Raghava's mother
- Renuka as Nandini's sister-in-law
- Jayaprakash as Marudhu
- Rajendran as Marudhu's younger brother
- Suhasini Maniratnam as Green TV Head
- Sriman as Dr. Prasad
- Mayilsamy as Watchman
- Pooja Ramachandran as Pooja
- Manobala as Arnold
- Jangiri Madhumitha as Aishwarya
- Pandu as Dr. Pandurangan (Psychiatrist)
- Chaams as Aravind Swamy
- Bhanu Chander as Chandru
- Vinu Chakravarthy as Raghava's father (photo only)
- Mathi as Church Father
- Boys Rajan as 24TV Director
- C.M. Bala as priest
- Muthukaalai as 1st mortuary worker
- Nellai Siva as 2nd mortuary worker
- Janani Balasubramaniam
- Ramar (special appearance in "Sillatta Pillatta")
- Elviin Lawrence (special appearance in "Sillatta Pillatta")

== Production ==
Raghava Lawrence began work on the third installment in the Muni franchise in 2012, then titled Muni 3: Ganga. He said that he had two different storylines for the sequel. Taapsee Pannu was selected as the female lead. Anjali was said to have been signed for role of Ganga, but she was later replaced by Nithya Menen. Lawrence introduced his brother Elvin in the film, who danced in a music video. Lawrence was reported to be appearing in six different looks in the film. Pooja Ramachandran was also chosen and was said to be playing the role of an anchor. In October 2013, Lawrence injured himself while filming and the making of the film was stopped for over three months. The film was in production for over two years.

== Soundtrack ==
Kanchana 2

Soundtrack album by C. Sathya Leon James S. Thaman Aswamithra
- Released: 1 March 2015
- Recorded: 2015
- Genre: Feature film soundtrack
- Length: 21:40
- Label: AP International
- Producers: Dhina; Leon James; S. Thaman; Aswamithra

S. Thaman chronology
Savaale Samaali (2015)	Kanchana 2 (2015)	Pandaga Chesko (2015)

C. Sathya chronology
Ivan Veramathiri (2013)	Kanchana 2 (2015)	Velainu Vandhutta Vellaikaaran (2016)

Leon James chronology
Kanchana 2 (2015)	Ko 2 (2016)

Aswamithra chronology
Kanchana 2 (2015)	Cinderella (2021)

The soundtrack features five songs composed by C. Sathya, S. Thaman, debutants Ashwamithra and Leon James, with the latter contributing two songs to the album.

No.	Title	Lyrics	Music	Singers	Length
1.	"Sandi Muni"	Viveka	Leon James	Haricharan, Leon James	4:40
2.	"Vaaya En Veera"	Ko. Sesha	Leon James	Shakthisree Gopalan	4:38
3.	"Silatta Pilatta"	Logan	C. Sathya	Jagadeesh Kumar, C. Sathya	4:18
4.	"Motta Paiyaa"	Viveka	S. Thaman	K. S. Chithra, Sooraj Santhosh	4:32
5.	"Moda Moda"	Viveka	Aswamithra	Master Sriman Roshan
6.	"Om Rudraya Hey"	Viveka	Aswamithra	Master Sriman Roshan	3:32
Total length:					21:40

== Release ==
The film was released on 17 April 2015 in around 750 screens worldwide alongside Mani Ratnam's O Kadhal Kanmani. The Telugu version was released later on 1 May 2015 in around 550 screens.

=== Critical reception ===
Kanchana 2 opened to positive reviews from critics.

The Times of India gave 3 stars out of 5 and wrote, "The comedy is broad and low-brow, banking on gay humour and the reactions of the characters when they are spooked by the presence of the ghost. It becomes too childish at times but you laugh nevertheless...the film does what it promises — we chuckle, cower, cry and at times, cringe". Behindwoods gave the film 2.75 out of 5 stars and said, "Looks like Lawrence has mastered the genre, so well that he knows how to keep the audience at the edge of their seats. His creative imagination has made this film different from the usual horror comedy films". Rediff rated the film 2.5 on 5, calling it "an enjoyable film" and wrote, "The plot may be out of date and the comedy absurd, but the antics of the familiar characters and their enthusiasm make you laugh despite yourself". Sify wrote, "Kanchana 2 is no different from Lawrence's earlier horror comedies...The formula is the same – mix crass comedy with lots of horror, dead person's spirit getting into hero/heroine body, slapstick humour, glamour, melodrama, ladies sentiments, fight scenes...Add five songs, haunted house, scream and wailing sounds, it works".

Indo-Asian News Service gave 2.5 stars out of 5 and wrote, "The movie, which follows a very clichéd and dated format of horror template, suffers heavily due to the lack of a good story" and called it "undoubtedly a weak film in the franchise".

The Hindu wrote, "The acting isn’t the problem; the predictable story is...Kanchana-3, which is hinted at before the end credits, needs to do better if the franchise has to survive".

=== Box office ===
Kanchana 2 grossed over ₹108 crore (US$11 million) worldwide.

On its first day, the film grossed ₹5.77 crore (US$600,000) nett in Tamil Nadu alone and around ₹10 crore (US$1.0 million) worldwide. The film had a "phenomenal" opening, earning ₹10.83 crore (US$1.1 million) nett in Tamil Nadu in two days. Kanchana 2 earned ₹17.5 crore (US$1.8 million) nett in Tamil Nadu in its opening weekend. The film netted ₹1.55 crore (US$160,000) in Karnataka, ₹88 lakh (US$91,000) in Kerala and ₹22 lakh (US$23,000) from the rest of India. In Chennai city alone, the film made ₹1.31 crore (US$140,000) in three days.

The film grossed ₹40 crore (US$4.2 million) in Tamil Nadu in ten days. It made ₹51.5 crore (US$5.3 million) from TN, Kerala and Karnataka in fourteen days.

Ganga, the Telugu version collected ₹12.2 crore (US$1.3 million) share in its first week with a gross of ₹19.3 crore (US$2.0 million). The final share was ₹18.65 crore (US$1.9 million), making it the third highest earning dubbed film in AP/Telangana after I and Enthiran.

The film opened with ₹7 lakh (US$7,300) in the United States on a limited release. In UK and Ireland, the film made ₹24 lakh (US$25,000) in the opening weekend. In Malaysia, the film had a very good opening, grossing ₹1.36 crore (US$140,000) in its first three days.

== Sequel ==
The fourth and penultimate instalment of this series and a sequel to the film, Kanchana 3 was released on 19 April 2019. While it was actually connected to Muni 2: Kanchana, due to Kanchana being a bigger hit and more interesting than Kanchana 2, and Kanchana 2 being a different story, it was not the sequel to the previous film and it had the cast from the previous film reprising their roles.

== Legacy ==
The dialogue from this film "Motta Siva Ketta Siva" inspired a 2017 film of the same name also starring Raghava Lawrence.
