= Fear of ghosts =

Phasmophobia

The fear of ghosts in many human cultures is based on beliefs that some ghosts may be malevolent towards people and dangerous (within the range of all possible attitudes, including mischievous, benign, indifferent, etc.). It is related to fear of the dark. The fear of ghosts is a very common fear.

A persistent fear of ghosts is sometimes phasmophobia, a type of specific phobia. It derives from Greek φάσμα, phásma, meaning "apparition" and -φοβία, -phobía, meaning "fear". It is often brought about by experiences in early childhood and causes sufferers to experience panic attacks.

== Typical character ==
The fear of ghosts is widespread even in post-industrial societies. Philosopher Peter van Inwagen wrote:

"...I am perfectly aware that the fear of ghosts is contrary to science, reason and religion. If I were sentenced to spend a night alone in a graveyard, <...> I should already know that twigs would snap and the wind moan and that there would be half-seen movements in the darkness. And yet, after I had been frog-marched into the graveyard, I should feel a thrill of fear every time one of these things happened..."

In many traditional accounts, ghosts are often thought to be deceased people looking for vengeance, or imprisoned on earth for bad things they did during life. The appearance of a ghost has often been regarded as an omen or portent of death. Seeing one's own ghostly double or doppelgänger is a related omen of death.

== Wari' ==
Wari', an Amazon rainforest tribe, believe that the spirits of dead people may appear as scaring specters called jima. The jima is said to grab a person with very strong, cold and poisonous hands and try to pull the person's spirit away.

== Papuans ==
A 19th-century missionary describes the fear of ghosts among Papuans as follows:

"That a great fear of ghosts prevails among the Papuans is intelligible. Even by day they are reluctant to pass a grave, but nothing would induce them to do so by night. For the dead are then roaming about in their search for gambier and tobacco, and they may also sail out to sea in a canoe. Some of the departed, above all the so-called Mambrie or heroes, inspire them with especial fear. In such cases for some days after the burial you may hear about sunset a simultaneous and horrible din in all the houses of all the villages, a yelling, screaming, beating and throwing of sticks; happily the uproar does not last long: its intention is to compel the ghost to take himself off: they have given him all that befits him, namely, a grave, a funeral banquet, and funeral ornaments; and now they beseech him not to thrust himself on their observation any more, not to breathe any sickness upon the survivors, and not to kill them or "fetch" them, as the Papuans put it."

== See also ==
- List of phobias
