= S. P. Parasuram =

- Theatrical poster
- Directed by: Ravi Raja Pinisetty
- Written by: P. Vasu
- Based on: Walter Vetrivel (1993)
- Produced by: Allu Aravind; G. K. Reddy; Mukesh Udeshi
- Starring: Chiranjeevi; Sridevi
- Cinematography: K. S. Prakash
- Edited by: Vemuri Ravi
- Music by: M. M. Keeravani
- Production company: Sai Charan Combines
- Release date: 15 June 1994
- Country: India
- Language: Telugu

S. P. Parasuram is a 1994 Indian Telugu-language action drama film directed by Ravi Raja Pinisetty. The film stars Chiranjeevi and Sridevi in the lead roles, while Harish Kumar, Devaraj, and Sharat Saxena play supporting roles. It is produced by Allu Aravind, G. K. Reddy, and Mukesh Udeshi. S. P. Parasuram was a remake of the 1993 Tamil film Walter Vetrivel starring Sathyaraj. The film was dubbed into Hindi as Azaad Desh Ka Andhaa Kanoon (despite already having a Hindi remake of the original Tamil film, which was released 3 months before S. P. Parasuram) and into Malayalam as Super Hero S. P. Parasuram. S. P. Parasuram is regarded as one of Sridevi's last works in Telugu film industry.The film was an average grosser at the box office. This was due to the fact that another remake of Walter Vetrivel (1993) known as Khuddar (1994) which was a Hindi language adaptation was released 3 months earlier and Khuddar (1994) was having a good run at the theatres especially in Hyderabad. While Khuddar's climax was exactly the same as that of Walter Vetrivel but the stylization of the climax of S.P.Parsuram (1994) was different from the other two above mentioned movies.

== Plot ==
A dangerous gang kidnaps women in various public places, sedates them, and uses them for pornography. SP Parasuram is a brave officer who goes to any extent to maintain law and order in the city, engaging in fights with goons. A small-time thief, Kumari, is almost a victim when she too is sedated but manages to escape, before looking at all the men, including the videographer Prashanth, Parasuram's brother. Parasuram comes across her, and she takes him to the building. He collects used syringes as a shred of evidence and hides Kumari. Prashanth is afraid that she might recognize him and reveals to the gang the place Kumari is hiding. The gang's leader attempt to kill her but fails; however, she goes blind due to a hit on her head.

Parasuram learns of SI Rayappa's possible involvement in the gang and thrashes him. The next day, he resigns and gets elected as Home Minister of the state and puts Parasuram as his security detail in-charge. Kumari gets her eyes operated on and recognizes Prashanth as the videographer of the pornography enterprise, without knowing that he is her husband's brother. Before Parasuram can get him, the gang murders him. In the hospital, he confesses to his brother that he was forced by the gang, lest they leak the video of him with a girl. Meanwhile, his fame rises due to his sincerity towards his duty and is reflected when the public hails him over the Home Minister. The Minister tries to make Parasuram put his shoe to his feet, but Parasuram thrashes him publicly with his shoe. After an outcry, he resigns.

When the Home Minister and the main villain hijack a train, Parasuram is infuriated and kills both of them. The police commissioner appreciates Parasuram, and the movie ends on a happy note.

== Cast ==
- Chiranjeevi as SP Parasuram, IPS
- Sridevi as Kumari
- Harish Kumar as Prasanth
- Devaraj as Rayappa
- Sharat Saxena as Bhavani, pornography producer
- Mahesh Anand as Kapali
- Brahmanandam as Parasuram's friend
- Allu Ramalingaiah
- Suryakantam as Lakshmikantham
- Ranganath
- Sudhakar

== Soundtrack ==
- "Arintidaka Atta Kodaka" - S. P. Balasubrahmanyam, K. S. Chitra
- "Emi Strokuro" - S. P. Balasubrahmanyam, K. S. Chitra
- "Champeyi Guru" - S. P. Balasubrahmanyam, K. S. Chitra
- "O Baba Kiss Me" - S. P. Balasubrahmanyam, K. S. Chitra, Miss 420
- "Yedavaku Yedavaku" - K. S. Chitra
- "Muddabanti" - S. P. Balasubrahmanyam, K. S. Chitra
- "Abbabba Ee Poddu" - S. P. Balasubrahmanyam, K. S. Chitra (Aa Aa E Ooh Ooh Ooh Mera Dil Na Todo - Raja Babu)
