= Chinna Thambi =

- Theatrical release poster
- Directed by: P. Vasu
- Written by: P. Vasu
- Produced by: Balu
- Starring: Prabhu; Khushbu
- Cinematography: Ravinder
- Edited by: P. Mohanraj
- Music by: Ilaiyaraaja
- Production company: Malar Combines
- Release date: 12 April 1991
- Running time: 138 minutes
- Country: India
- Language: Tamil

Chinna Thambi (transl. Little Brother) is a 1991 Indian Tamil-language romantic musical drama film written and directed by P. Vasu. The film stars Prabhu as the titular character, an uneducated village simpleton and Khushbu as Nandini, a homeschooled wealthy girl. Manorama, Radha Ravi, Uday Prakash, Rajeshkumar, and Goundamani play supporting roles. The music was composed by Ilaiyaraaja, and the film released on 12 April 1991.

The film was remade in Kannada as Ramachaari (1991), Telugu as Chanti (1992) and Hindi as Anari (1993). The film was one of Prabhu's biggest blockbusters and completed a 356-day run in 9 screens and 100-day run in 47 screens.

== Plot ==
The film starts with the birth of a baby girl, Nandini, in a rich family on outskirts of Erode. Her three elder brothers throw a feast in honour of her. The young son of the local singer (who had died) is brought in to sing for the event. The three brothers raise Nandini like their own child as their parents had died. At the age of five, an astrologer predicts that Nandini will bring much happiness to the family, but she will marry a person of her choice and not of her brothers' choosing. This angers the brothers, and to prevent this from happening, they raise Nandhini within the confines of the house. She is homeschooled, and when she does go out, all the men are warned to hide from Nandini and that seeing her will be met with dire consequences.

Nandini soon reaches puberty. The few males allowed around her are the service staff and her bodyguards. Meanwhile, the boy who sang, Chinna Thambi, grows up to be a naïve and gullible simpleton with a heart of gold. He is raised by his widowed mother Kannamma. He does not go to school and spends his time singing and entertaining the people of the village.

One day the bodyguards get into a fight with Chinna Thambi, who defeats them. Impressed with Thambi's naivete and fighting skills, the brothers hire him to be Nandini's bodyguard and butler. Nandini meanwhile starts to resent her lack of freedom. She coerces Thambi to show her the village without her brothers' knowledge. Thambi complies with her wishes and shows her the village, which results in Nandini falling ill. Thambi is blamed for Nandini getting sick and is beaten up by the brothers. Nandini, who has just started to like Thambi, feels guilty for being the reason for him getting thrashed. She shares her medicine with Thambi, who inadvertently equates Nandini to his mother, as being the few people who truly care for him. This incident brings them closer together emotionally.

One day, a factory worker is punished for leering at Nandini. He plots to kill her at the inauguration of the new factory owned by her brothers. Thambi overhears the plot, and in a desperate attempt to save Nandini, lunges at her and inadvertently feels her up in public. Nandini does not mind and defends Thambi by arguing that he would not do something like that in public without good reason. But her brothers are enraged and beat Thambi to the point that they almost kill him. Nandini stops them and gives him a chance to explain. When Thambi explains the situation, they hang their heads in shame. Thambi quits his job on the spot, despite Nandini's silent apology.

At night, Nandini meets Thambi and apologises and perhaps convince him to come back to the job. Thambi refuses to come back as he does not want to put up with the violent nature of her brothers. She thinks if Thambi marries her, they will not be able to manhandle him. She convinces Thambi to tie a mangalasutra around her neck, which will protect him from her brothers. Thambi, without realising the sanctity of the act, does as told and does not realise that he is now married to her.

Thambi comes back to work and is given a higher level of respect by the brothers for saving Nandini's life. Nandini too starts emulating her sisters-in-law in taking care of her husband. This makes Thambi nervous, but he still remains clueless. Her change in behaviour is noticed by her sisters-in-law, who urge the brothers to get Nandini married off before she brings shame to the family. Nandini, realising that they are trying to get her married off, tries to make Thambi understand that they are already married. Thambi refuses to understand and runs away to his mother, who upon learning what has happened, pulls him out of denial. She sends him away in an attempt to protect him.

The brothers come to know what has happened and torture Kannamma to get her to reveal where her son is hiding. She is saved in time by her son, who almost kills the brothers. The wives of the brothers stop him from killing them and ask him to save Nandini, who has now resorted to self-destruction upon hearing the torturous acts of her brothers. Thambi rushes back to save his wife and revives her with his singing. Nandini runs towards him and they embrace, with her brothers finally supporting their relationship.

== Cast ==
- Prabhu as Chinna Thambi
  - Master Shakthi as Young Chinna Thambi
- Khushbu as Nandhini
- Manorama as Kannamma
- Radha Ravi as Rathnavelu, Nandhini's first elder brother
- Rajeshkumar as Shanmugavelu, Nandhini's second elder brother
- Uday Prakash as Sakthivelu, Nandhini's third elder brother
- Goundamani as Cook Kandhasamy
- Sulakshana as Lakshmi, Rathnavelu's Wife
- Yuvasree as Meena, Shanmugavelu's Wife
- Pandu as Lingam
- Oru Viral Krishna Rao as Muniyandi
- Anuja as Sundari
- Marthandam as an insane man

== Production ==
P. Vasu asked his then 7-year old son Sakthi to play the younger version of Prabhu's character, and he immediately agreed. Khushbu joined the film at Vasu's insistence. Vasu was initially sceptical about casting Manorama as Prabhu's mother as he believed people would compare it to her vastly different role in Vasu's previous film Nadigan (1990), but Manorama remained confident it would not happen. The filming was held at Gobichettipalayam.

== Soundtrack ==
The soundtrack was composed by Ilaiyaraaja. The song "Nee Engey En Anbe" is set to the Carnatic raga Keeravani, as is "Poovoma Oorgolam". Ilaiyaraaja composed all the songs within 35 minutes. The song "Kuyila Pudichu" is set in Mayamalavagowla raga. All of them were chartbusters. The film proved to be a breakthrough for playback singer Swarnalatha.

Song	Singer(s)	Lyricist	Length
"Thooliyile Ada Vantha I"	K. S. Chithra	Vaali	2:40
"Thooliyile Ada Vantha II"	Mano	Vaali	4:38
"Poovoma Oorgolam"	Swarnalatha, S. P. Balasubrahmanyam	Gangai Amaran	4:44
"Ada Uchcham Thala"	S. P. Balasubrahmanyam	Vaali	4:58
"Kuyila Pudichchu"	S. P. Balasubrahmanyam	Vaali	4:46
"Arachcha Santhanam"	S. P. Balasubrahmanyam	Gangai Amaran	4:52
"Nee Engey En Anbe"	Swarnalatha	Gangai Amaran	5:04
"Thooliyile Ada Vantha III"	Mano	Vaali	1:52

== Reception ==
The Indian Express wrote, "The conflicts are generated in such a way as to excite the sentiments of lay audiences".

== Accolades ==
Chinna Thambi won the Tamil Nadu State Film Award for Best Film which met with criticism from Kalki.

Award	Category	Nominee	Ref.
Cinema Express Awards	Best Tamil Film	K. Balu	
Cinema Express Awards	Best Tamil Director	P. Vasu	
Cinema Express Awards	Best Tamil Actress	Khushbu	
Cinema Express Awards	Best Tamil Comedian	Goundamani	
Cinema Express Awards	Best Tamil Male Playback Singer	Mano	
Cinema Express Awards	Best Tamil Female Playback Singer	Swarnalatha	
Cinema Express Awards	Best Tamil Choreographer	D. K. S. Babu	
Film Fans Association Awards	Best Lyricist	Gangai Amaran	
Filmfare Awards South	Best Tamil Film	K. Balu	
Tamil Nadu State Film Awards	Best Film (First Place)	K. Balu	
Tamil Nadu State Film Awards	Best Director	P. Vasu	
Tamil Nadu State Film Awards	Best Actor in Lead Role	Prabhu	
Tamil Nadu State Film Awards	Best Actress in Lead Role	Khushbu	
Tamil Nadu State Film Awards	Best Male Playback Singer	Mano	
Tamil Nadu State Film Awards	Best Female Playback Singer	Swarnalatha	
Tamil Nadu State Film Awards	Best Choreographer	D. K. S. Babu	

== Remakes ==
Year	Film	Language	Ref.
1991	Ramachaari	Kannada	
1992	Chanti	Telugu	
1993	Anari	Hindi	

== Legacy ==
Chinna Thambi became a major breakthrough for Prabhu and Khushbu. They became one of the most successful lead pairs in Tamil cinema of the 1990s through this film. The success of the film also led the director, actor and actress to collaborate in another project Kizhakku Karai (1991) the following year. After the release, Vasu was conferred "Navarasa Director" award by Amudha Surabhi Kalai Mandram, Madurai.

Khushbu said in 2006, "I am still around only because of Chinna Thambi. None of us imagined it would become the kind of cult film it did. I remember director P. Vasu, hero Prabhu and I were very skeptical about the film while shooting. It was a bold subject at the time, and we thought it would either be a huge flop or a huge hit". Prabhu recalled, "People still talk about Chinna Thambi [...] I still remember my father’s words after the show. "Just as I got a Bhimbsingh, you've got Vasu", he said".

== In popular culture ==
After the film's success, Gobichettipalayam became a shooting hub for many films. Vasu alluded to Chinna Thambi in his later film Mannan (1992), in which Krishnan (Rajinikanth) and Muthu (Goundamani) would be seen rushing in the crowd to buy tickets to watch the film.

== Bibliography ==
- Sundararaman (2007) [2005]. Raga Chintamani: A Guide to Carnatic Ragas Through Tamil Film Music (2nd ed.). Pichhamal Chintamani. OCLC 295034757.
