= Ala Ila Ela =

- Telugu poster
- Directed by: Raghava Dwaraki
- Written by: Raghava Tiruvaipati (dialogues)
- Produced by: G. Naga Raju
- Starring: Shakthi Vasudevan; Poorna; Raja Chembolu
- Cinematography: P. K. H. Das
- Edited by: K. Sasikumar
- Music by: Mani Sharma
- Production company: Kala Movie Makers
- Release dates: 21 July 2023 (Telugu); 28 August 2024 (Tamil)
- Country: India
- Languages: Telugu; Tamil

Ala Ila Ela (transl. Like that, like this, how?) is a 2023 Indian action romantic thriller film directed by Raghava Dwarki starring Shakthi Vasudevan, Poorna, and Raja Chembolu. The film was simultaneously shot in Telugu and Tamil with the latter version titled as Oru Thee (transl. A fire). The music was composed by Mani Sharma with cinematography by P. K. H. Das and editing by K. Sasikumar. The film began production in 2012 but released after a 10-year delay. It received negative reviews due to its outdated feel.

== Cast ==
- Shakthi Vasudevan as R. Suryaprakash (Mithra)
- Poorna as Anu
- Raja Chembolu as Karthik (credited as Raja Shankar)
- Rekha Vedavyas
- Hariprriya as Priya
- Nagendra Babu as Surya's father
- Seetha as Surya's mother
- Sayaji Shinde as Anu's father
- Sithara as Janaki, Anu's mother
- Riyaz Khan as Police Officer
- Brahmanandam as LIC Jeevan
- Ali (in Telugu) / Vivek (in Tamil) as Jim Carry
- Priyanka Kothari in a special appearance

== Production ==
The film was announced in December 2012 by Dwaraki Raghavan, the director of Iruvar Mattum (2006), as a Tamil-Telugu bilingual with the Tamil title announced as Padam Pesum (transl. The film will talk). Poorna worked on this film alongside Thagaraaru (2013) in April 2013. As of May 2013, 90% of the film's shooting was complete, which happened in Coorg, Chennai, Hyderabad, Kerala and Visakhapatnam with a song canned in North India. In July of 2013, Priyanka Kothari shot for a song in tribal clothes titled "Kannamoochi" in the Tamil version. The film was shot in 83 days.

In June 2023, the Telugu version's name was revealed to be Ala Ila Ela, and the film was preparing for release. The delayed release of the film meant that it was the final film of former actors Shakthi Vasudevan, Rekha Vedavyas, and Priyanka Kothari. The Tamil version had changed its title to Oru Thee and had a direct television premiere on Thanthi One on 28 August 2024.

== Soundtrack ==
The music was composed by Mani Sharma. The song "Aha Nilabadvate" was released by P. Vasu, Shakthi's father. The audio rights were bagged by Aditya Music.

Telugu Track listing
No.	Title	Lyrics	Singer(s)	Length
1.	"Padi Padi Parugidi"	Sirivennela Seetharama Sastry	Rahul Nambiar, Chaitra	5:19
2.	"Aha Nilabadvate"	Sirivennela Seetharama Sastry	Chaitra	4:53
3.	"Dakkho Dakkho"	Bhaskarabhatla	Chaitra	4:48
4.	"Ennalla Karuninchave"	Sirivennela Seetharama Sastry	Chaitra	3:29
Total length:				18:29

Tamil Track listing

- "Kannamoochi"

== Reception ==
A critic from Zee News rated the film 2 3/4 out of 5 and wrote that "Although the film was stretched here and there and is boring, the interval and climax twists were well worked out. But the big minus is that it doesn't feel new anywhere". A critic from NTV Telugu rated the film 2 1/2 out of 5 and wrote that "Being a routine story, there is novelty anywhere in the film. It can be said that it is the minus point of the whole movie". A critic from Sakshi gave the film the same rating.
