= Raghava Lawrence =

Indian actor and choreographer

- Born: Lawrence Murugaiyan; 29 October 1976 (age 49)
- Occupations: Actor; Choreographer; Film director; Composer; Playback singer; Lyricist; Film producer; Philanthropist
- Years active: 1992–present
- Spouse: Latha Lawrence
- Children: 1

Raghava Lawrence (born Lawrence Murugaiyan on 29 October 1976) is an Indian actor, choreographer, film director, composer, playback singer, lyricist, film producer and philanthropist known for his works primarily in Tamil cinema. After making his debut as a dance choreographer in 1993, he began looking for acting opportunities. He began his career as an actor in the Telugu film Speed Dancer (1999).

He adopted the name "Raghava" in 2001, and choreographed songs for many prominent actors and directors in Tamil and Telugu cinema throughout his career. He got his breakthrough as an actor with the Telugu film Style (2006) and Tamil horror comedy Muni (2007). As a choreographer, he is known for his simple but intricate hip-hop and westernised dance moves and has won four Filmfare Awards, three Nandi Awards, and two Tamil Nadu State Film Awards for Best Choreography and one Vijay Awards for social responsibility.

== Early life and background ==
Lawrence had a brain tumor when he was a child. He attributes the curing of his tumor to the deity, Raghavendra Swamy, and in an act of devotion, he took the name Raghava He built the Raghavendra Swamy Brindavanam Temple at Thirumullaivayal on the Avadi-Ambattur route, which opened on 1 January 2010. Raghava also has a younger brother, Elvin.

== Career ==
=== Initial career (1992–2001) ===
He was working as a car cleaner for fight master Super Subbarayan. Rajinikanth saw him dancing and helped him to join the Dancers Union. He made his first appearance in Donga Police (1992) while doing some dances with Prabhu Deva including working as a background dancer in the song "Chikku Bukku Chikku Bukku Raile" in Gentleman (1993). In 1993, he also appeared in dance sequences in Muta Mesthri, Rakshana, and Allari Priyudu. Chiranjeevi offered him the job of choreographing the dances for Hitler (1997). Pleased with Lawrence's work, Chiranjeevi asked him to choreograph dances for Master (1997), his next film too. Producer T V D Prasad offered him the role of a hero in his venture Speed Dancer (1999). That film was a flop. After that he acted small roles in Tamil like Ajith Kumar's Unnai Kodu Ennai Tharuven (2000) and Prashanth's Parthen Rasithen (2000). Director K. Balachander invited him to act in his 100th film Parthale Paravasam (2001).

=== Establishing career (2002–2010) ===
He acted as a first lead role in the Tamil with Arpudham (2002). As described in a review by Sify, "the latest in the line is Lawrence, who like his predecessor Prabhu Deva, is determined to be a hero". Arputham has a decent screenplay and Lawrence is tolerable". Thereafter, Style (2002). After making guest appearances in several films including Thirumalai (2003) and Thendral (2004), he directed his first film in Telugu, Mass (2004) starring Nagarjuna and Jyothika. The movie was a commercial success.

He subsequently directed and acted in Style (2006) co-starring with Prabhu Deva and featuring Nagarjuna and Chiranjeevi in guest roles. He got his breakthrough with Muni (2007), a horror thriller film. Thereafter, he directed another film, Don (2007). The film starring Nagarjuna and Anushka Shetty. Raghava acted in second roles and made the film depending only on style and technical aspects. The movie had an average response. Raghava continues to play in different categories films such as Pandi (2008), Rajadhi Raja (2009) and Irumbukkottai Murattu Singam (2010). Pandi was a moderate success, while Rajadhi Raja was released to negative reviews, and Irumbukkottai Murattu Singam was released to mixed reviews.

=== Later career (2011–present) ===
He takes the series Muni in Kanchana (2011). Sarath Kumar play in the main role. The movie was commercially successful. In 2012, he directed Telugu movie Rebel starring Prabhas and Tamannaah. He acted in Kanchana 2 (2015). In 2017, he starred in an action Masala film, Motta Shiva Ketta Shiva. Sify described the film as, "Crass, loud and brainless." Then another of genre horror Shivalinga, remake a Kannada language with the same name directed by P. Vasu. Shakthi Vasudevan, son of director, also starred in the important role for two versions. The story is a cop investigating the suspicious death of a Muslim finds out that his own wife has become possessed by the young man's ghost. Raghava Lawrence is back with the fourth movie in the series – Muni 4: Kanchana 3: Kaali (2019), with the new change being three heroines. The film has received a good collections at the box office. In 2020, he made his directorial debut in Hindi cinema with film, Laxmii, a remake of Muni 2: Kanchana.

On November 10, 2023, the movie Jigarthanda DoubleX, featuring actors Raghava Lawrence and SJ Suryah in the lead roles, was released as a prequel to the original film, Jigarthanda.

On 14 April 2024, it was announced that Lawrence will be starring in a film titled Benz, directed by Bakkiyaraj Kannan and written and produced by Lokesh Kanagaraj, which was confirmed as a part of the Lokesh Cinematic Universe in October 2024.

== Social work ==
In 2015, after the death of former Indian president A. P. J. Abdul Kalam, Lawrence set up a charity trust in his name and made a donation of ₹1 crore (US$100,000).

He did many social service activities in which he has aided many heart surgeries for small children. He was one of the supporters of the bull-riding sport jallikattu after its ban in 2017. During a protest in Tamil Nadu in January 2017, he provided food, medicine and basic needs to the protesters and promised to support them until the protests were over. He asked for an appointment with Kerala chief minister Pinarayi Vijayan to donate 1 crore as relief fund for the Kerala flood victims.

== Filmography ==
=== Film director ===
List of films as director
Year	Film	Language	Notes
2004	Mass	Telugu	
2006	Style	Telugu	
2007	Muni	Tamil	
2007	Don	Telugu	Also Music Director
2011	Kanchana	Tamil	Also producer
2012	Rebel	Telugu	
2015	Kanchana 2	Tamil	Also producer
2019	Kanchana 3	Tamil	Also producer
2020	Laxmii	Hindi	A remake of Kanchana (2011)
2026	Kanchana 4 †	Tamil	Filming; also producer

=== Actor ===
List of acting performances in film
Year	Film	Role(s)	Language	Notes
1992	Donga Police	Lorry driver	Telugu	Uncredited appearance in the song "Jee Tee Todu Meeda"
1993	Rakshana		Telugu	Uncredited appearance in the song "Gallumandi Boss"; also assistant director
1995	Valli Vara Pora	Crowd member	Tamil	Uncredited appearance in the song "Rootula Juttula"
1999	Speed Dancer	Seenu	Telugu	
2000	Unnai Kodu Ennai Tharuven	Ganapathi	Tamil	
2000	Parthen Rasithen	Doss	Tamil	
2001	Parthale Paravasam	Azhagu	Tamil	
2002	Arpudham	Ashok Kumar	Tamil	
2002	Style	Rishaanth	Tamil	
2004	Thendral	Kumar	Tamil	
2004	Mass	Local gangster	Telugu	Special appearance
2006	Style	Raghava	Telugu	
2007	Muni	Ganesh	Tamil	
2007	Don	Raghava	Telugu	
2008	Pandi	Pandi	Tamil	
2009	Rajadhi Raja	Raja	Tamil	
2010	Irumbukkottai Murattu Singam	Singam & Singaram (Note: Lawrence plays a dual role films.)	Tamil	Dual role
2011	Kanchana	Raghava	Tamil	
2015	Kanchana 2	Raghava & Shiva	Tamil	Dual role
2017	Motta Siva Ketta Siva	ACP Shivakumar	Tamil	Also playback singer for song "Motta Paiyan"
2017	Shivalinga	Shivalingeswaran	Tamil	
2019	Kanchana 3	Raghava & Kaali	Tamil	Dual role
2023	Rudhran	Rudhran	Tamil	
2023	Chandramukhi 2	Pandian & Sengottaiyan Vettaiyan	Tamil	Dual role
2023	Jigarthanda DoubleX	Alliyus "Alliyan" Caesar	Tamil	
TBA	Adhigaram †	TBA	Tamil	Filming
TBA	Benz †	TBA	Tamil	Filming
TBA	Kaala Bhairava †	TBA	Tamil	Filming
TBA	Bullet †	Kingstar	Tamil	Post-production
TBA	Hunter †	TBA	Tamil	Filming
TBA	Kanchana 4 †	TBA	Tamil	Filming

=== Dancer ===
- Note: this is a list of films that Raghava Lawrence only appeared as a dancer.

List of dancing performances in film
Year	Film	Song	Language	Notes
1992	Donga Police		Telugu	
1992	Pandian	"Adi Jumba"	Tamil	
1993	Mutha Mestri	"Ee Pettakku"	Telugu	
1993	Allari Priyudu	"Rose Rose Roja Puvva"	Telugu	
1993	Uzhaippali	"Uzhaippali Illatha"	Tamil	
1993	Gentleman	"Chikku Bukku Rayile"	Tamil	
1994	Chinna Madam	"Kora Kizhangukku Kodi"	Tamil	
1995	Thai Thangai Paasam	"Roopu Tera Masthana"	Tamil	
1996	Akka Bagunnava	"Aalesha Deko Pyaree"	Telugu	
1997	Hitler	"Nadaka Kalisina Navaraatri"	Telugu	
1998	Prema Pallaki	"Kannepilla Pongulu "	Telugu	
1998	Suryudu	"Manasu Mamatha"	Telugu	
1999	Amarkkalam	"Maha Ganapathi"	Tamil	
2000	Thirunelveli	"Yele Azhagamma"	Tamil	
2000	Kshemamga Velli Labhamga Randi	"Lovvuki Age"	Telugu	
2000	Hands Up	"Jaana Jaana"	Telugu	
2000	Chala Bagundi	"Yentabagundi Basu"	Telugu	
2000	Unnai Kodu Ennai Tharuven	"Sollu Thalaiva"	Tamil	
2000	Bagunnara?	"Tirumala Tirupati Venkatesa"	Telugu	
2001	Asura	"Maha Ganapathi"	Kannada	
2002	Varushamellam Vasantham	"Naan Ready Neenga Readya"	Tamil	
2002	Roja Kootam	"Subbamma"	Tamil	
2002	Baba	"Maya Maya"	Tamil	
2003	Ninne Istapaddanu	"Krishna Zilla"	Telugu	
2003	Satyam	"Kuch Kuch"	Telugu	
2003	Naaga	"Nayudori Pilla"	Telugu	
2003	Pudhiya Geethai	"Annamalai"	Tamil	
2003	Thirumalai	"Thaamthakka Dheemthakka"	Tamil	
2010	Pen Singam	"Adi Aadi Asaiyum Iduppu"	Tamil	
2014	Kathai Thiraikathai Vasanam Iyakkam	"Live The Moment"	Tamil	

=== Television ===
- Masthaana Masthaana Part II (2007)

== Discography ==
=== As a playback singer ===
List of films as a playback singer
Song(s)	Year	Film	Composer
"Thala Suttuthe Maamu"	2007	Muni	Bharadwaj
"Motta Motta Paiyyan"	2017	Motta Siva Ketta Siva	Amresh Ganesh
"Lo Lo Lo Local"	2017	Motta Siva Ketta Siva	Amresh Ganesh

=== As a music composer ===
List of films as music composer
Year	Film	Language	Notes
2007	Don	Telugu	Songs only; score composed by S. Chinna
2012	Rebel	Telugu	Songs only; score composed by S. Chinna

=== As lyricist ===
Year	Film	Song	Notes
2011	Kanchana	"Nillu Nillu"	

== Accolades ==
Award	Category	Film	Year	Result	Ref.
Filmfare Awards South	Best Choreography	Annayya	2000	Won	
Filmfare Awards South	Best Choreography	Paarthale Paravasam	2001	Won	
Filmfare Awards South	Best Choreography	Indra	2002	Won	
Filmfare Awards South	Best Choreography	Style	2006	Won	
Nandi Awards	Best Choreographer	Annayya	2000	Won	
Nandi Awards	Best Choreographer	Indra	2002	Won	
Nandi Awards	Best Choreographer	Style	2006	Won	
Tamil Nadu State Film Awards	Best Choreographer	Kannupada Poguthaiya	1999	Won	
Tamil Nadu State Film Awards	Best Choreographer	Kanchana	2011	Won	
Vijay Awards	Social Responsibility	–	2010	Won	
