= Adhikari (film) =

- Directed by: P. Vasu
- Written by: P. Vasu
- Produced by: K. Kanagasabai
- Starring: C. Arunpandian; Gautami
- Cinematography: M. C. Sekhar
- Edited by: P. Mohanraj
- Music by: Gangai Amaran
- Production company: Jayanthi Films
- Release date: 14 April 1991
- Running time: 120 minutes
- Country: India
- Language: Tamil

Adhikari (transl. Official) is a 1991 Indian Tamil-language action film directed by P. Vasu. The film stars C. Arunpandian and Gautami, with Anand, Goundamani, Senthil, Sethu Vinayagam, Srividya, Anju, Rocky, Rajeshkumar, Choudary and Abhilasha playing supporting roles. The film is a remake of P. Vasu's own 1986 Kannada film Guri. It was released on 14 April 1991 and was an unexpected box office failure.

== Plot ==
Duraipandi escapes from jail to take revenge on the gold smuggler Varadappan. Varadappan tried many ways to kill Duraipandi in jail, but his henchmen failed each time. Pursued by the police, the fugitive Duraipandi lands in a remote village where a woman named Ponni helps him hide. There, he meets his former colleague Anbu, surprised by Duraipandi, Anbu runs away and dies by getting hit by a car. Anbu is none other than Ponni's brother. After the funeral, Duraipandi tells Ponni the reason of his desire for revenge on Varadappan.

In the past, Duraipandi was a sincere and fearless custom officer. He lived happily with his mother and his sister Seetha. One day, Duraipandi seized a cargo full of illegal gold bars belonging to Varadappan. In the meantime, Seetha got engaged with the police inspector Sarath. Everything went well until Varadappan planned to send Duraipandi behind bars. Under the orders of Varadappan, Duraipandi's co-workers Mary, Rocky, Raghu, and Anbu betrayed Duraipandi, and Duraipandi was sent to jail by Sarath for trying to rape Mary. Seetha's wedding was cancelled; thus Seetha committed suicide and Duraipandi's mother became mentally ill.

Duraipandi knows that Mary was killed by Varadappan and the only information he had was Anbu's location. Duraipandi and Ponni fall in love with each other and start to live together. Later, Rocky is blackmailed by Varadappan, so Rocky tries to murder Duraipandi. During the fight, however, Rocky accidentally falls off a mountain cliff and dies. Duraipandi decides to take care of Rocky's baby son. Afterwards, Raghu gets killed by Varadappan's henchmen.

Duraipandi is still in pursuit of Varadappan to kill him, whereas the police want to capture the fugitive Duraipandi. What transpires later forms the crux of the story.

== Cast ==
- C. Arunpandian as Duraipandi IRS customs officer
- Gautami as Ponni
- Anand as Sarath
- Goundamani
- Senthil
- Sethu Vinayagam as Varadappan
- Srividya as Duraipandi's mother
- Anju as Seetha
- Rocky as Rocky
- Rajeshkumar as Raghu
- Choudary as Anbu
- Abhilasha as Mary
- Poornam Viswanathan as Raghu's father
- Typist Gopu
- Kalaiselvi
- Keerthy
- Thilak
- Rajmadhan as Doctor
- Master Gowtham Vishnu as Rocky's son
- Vijayakumar as Inspector Vijayakumar (guest appearance)
- Manjula Vijayakumar as Doctor Manjula (guest appearance)
- Prabhu Deva in a special appearance

== Soundtrack ==
The soundtrack was composed by Gangai Amaran, with lyrics written by Vaali.

Song	Singer(s)	Duration
"Aathoram Poonthopu"	S. P. Balasubrahmanyam, K. S. Chithra	4:58
"Indha Raja"	S. P. Balasubrahmanyam, K. S. Chithra	4:17
"Naiyaandi Melam"	S. P. Balasubrahmanyam, K. S. Chithra	4:48
"Purushan Veetil"	Mano, Swarnalatha	4:45
"Veetula Yaarumilla"	Swarnalatha	5:05
