= Mahesh, Saranya Matrum Palar =

2008 film by P. V. Ravi

- Theatrical release poster
- Directed by: P. V. Ravi
- Written by: P. V. Ravi
- Produced by: Chida.Shenbaga kumar
- Starring: Sakthi; Sandhya; Saranya Mohan
- Cinematography: K. Gunasekaran
- Edited by: K. Mohan Kumar
- Music by: Vidyasagar
- Production company: Kool Productions
- Release date: 28 November 2008
- Running time: 145 minutes
- Country: India
- Language: Tamil

Mahesh, Saranya Matrum Palar (transl. Mahesh, Saranya and many others) is a 2008 Indian Tamil-language romantic drama film written and directed by Ravi, starring Sakthi Vasu and Sandhya. The film, produced by Chida Shenbaga Kumar under the banner, Kool Productions, was released on 28 November 2008.

== Plot ==
Mahesh returns to his family from Chennai, where he is studying. He comes to Chennai for the wedding of his sister Keerthana, who he dotes on. He starts telling her about a girl Saranya, with whom he accidentally meets and falls in love with. Slowly, at regular intervals, this narration continues as everyone on the large household joins one by one to hear Mahesh's love story. Finally, on the day of Keerthana's marriage, a twist in the story happens as Mahesh is forced to confess the climax of his love story. When he is leaving, Saranya is brutally murdered by a rowdy. Mahesh goes after the rowdy and hacks him to death. Before going to jail, he wants to see Keerthana married. After the marriage, Mahesh turns himself to the police.

== Cast ==
- Sakthi Vasu as Mahesh
- Sandhya as Saranya
- Saranya Mohan as Keerthana
- Srinath as Vaidyanathan
- Santhanam as Mahesh's friend
- Srithika
- Vinodhini
- N. Anand
- Kalyanamalai Mohan
- Nandha Saravanan
- John Amirtharaj
- Keerthi Chawla in a special appearance

== Soundtrack ==
Soundtrack was composed by Vidyasagar. The audio launch was held in mid-November 2008.

Song title	Singers	Lyrics
"Vaikarai Paniyae"	S. P. Balasubrahmanyam	Yugabharathi
"Thanthathil Seitha Nila"	S. P. Balasubrahmanyam	Jayantha
"Thajam Thajam"	Binny Krishnakumar	P. Vijay
"Vizhiyil Vizhiyil"	Haricharan, Rita	P. Vijay
"En Padal"	Saindhavi	Yugabharathi
"Katrae Katrae"	Benny Dayal	Na. Muthukumar
"En Uyirukkul"	Rajalakshmi, Tippu	Jayantha
"Yaarathu Yaarathu"	Karthik	P. Vijay

== Critical reception ==
Malathi Rangarajan of The Hindu wrote, "Mahesh, Saranya, Matrum Palar is a neat family film. It is also true that things are unbelievably hunky-dory in this joint family and hence, too cinematic". Pavithra Srinivasan of Rediff.com gave the film 1.5 stars out of 5 and wrote, "The title is in itself an interesting one and you settle down with some anticipation. But pretty soon you wish debutante director P V Ravi had concentrated as much on his screenplay as he did in naming the film", calling it a "love-story that lacks spice". Sify wrote, "if there's only one reason which makes Mahesh Saranya Matrum Palar watchable is Shakti...He is in very good form even though the film isn't, with its old-fashioned plot points and characters. But it's not entirely unwatchable due to the manner in which it is narrated and the final twist in the story". Kabilan of Kalki praised the acting of Sakthi and Sandhya and humour but panned Vidyasagar's music and the cinematography, also feeling some of the scenes were too lengthy.
