= Khuddar (1994 film) =

- Promotional Poster
- Directed by: Iqbal Durrani
- Written by: Iqbal Durrani
- Based on: Walter Vetrivel by P. Vasu
- Produced by: N.R. Pachisia
- Starring: Govinda; Karishma Kapoor; Kader Khan; Shakti Kapoor
- Music by: Anu Malik
- Release date: 25 March 1994 (India)
- Country: India
- Language: Hindi
- Budget: ₹1.95 crore
- Box office: ₹8.44 crore

Khuddar (transl. Self-Respecting) is a 1994 Indian Hindi-language action film directed by Iqbal Durrani and starring Govinda, Karishma Kapoor and Kader Khan. It is a remake of the Tamil film Walter Vetrivel, starring Sathyaraj. Other cast members include Shakti Kapoor, Shreeram Lagoo, Anjana Mumtaz, Raju Shrestha, Mahesh Anand, Vikas Anand, Navneet Nishaan and Anil Dhawan. The film includes the controversial number "Sexy Sexy Sexy Mujhe Log Bole", which was censored to "Baby Baby Baby Mujhe Log Bole". The song itself is inspired from Italian singer Sabrina Salerno's 1987 hit "Boys". The dialogues of this film became so popular that separate audio cassettes of the dialogues were released.

== Plot ==
Shastri Suri (Shreeram Lagoo) comes from a middle-class and honest background. He has raised his son, police inspector Siddhant Suri (Govinda) and daughter Bindiya and second son Nandu (Raju Shrestha) in a similar way. But Nandu has fallen into bad company. He is part of a gang which kidnaps women for sex trafficking, led by Babujaan (Mahesh Anand) and Kapaali (Jack Gaud). After the gang targets Pooja (Karisma Kapoor), she turns witness to the police, and as a result, Pooja is attacked and loses her sight. A blind Pooja subsequently weds Siddhant, not knowing that her assailant is her brother-in-law. Shastriji's employee Kanhaiyalal (Kader Khan) is greedy and ambitious. When Shastriji stands for election, he is opposed strongly by corrupt and avaricious Adarsh Vardhan (Shakti Kapoor). Taking any means necessary, Adarsh wins the election and decides to humiliate the Suri family. He asks that his bodyguard be none other than Siddhant Suri. Siddhant must now choose between staying with the police force and serving his corrupt master.

Siddhant chooses to serve, but only so that he can find out more about the corrupt minister and his dealings and to reveal it to the public. Siddhant finally discloses the same to the public gathered in a rally, and the minister is forced to flee the scene. Pooja's eyes are operated upon, and her vision is restored. She identifies Nandu, and Siddhant takes revenge on his brother.

== Cast ==
- Govinda as Police Inspector Siddhant Suri, Pooja's husband
- Karishma Kapoor as Pooja Suri, Siddhant's wife
- Kader Khan as Kanhaiyalal
- Shakti Kapoor as Adarsh Vardhan
- Shreeram Lagoo as Kedarnath Shastri
- Anjana Mumtaz as Mrs Suri
- Raju Shrestha as Nandkishore “Nandu” Suri
- Aarti Nagpal as Bindiya, Siddhant's sister
- Mahesh Anand as Babujaan
- Vikas Anand as Doctor Mohan Khanna
- Achyut Potdar as Police Commissioner Lekh Singh
- Navneet Nishan as Jenny
- Anil Dhawan as Press Reporter Naresh Sehgal
- Adi Irani as Anand
- Rami Reddy as Swami
- Jack Gaud as Kapali
- Subbiraj as Surjan Vardhan, father of Adarsh Vardhan (Uncredited) (Photo-appearance)

== Soundtrack ==
Khuddar

Soundtrack album by Anu Malik
- Released: 1994
- Recorded: 1993
- Genre: Feature film soundtrack
- Length: 54:25
- Label: Tips Music

The soundtrack was very popular, most popular songs in album "Tumsa Koi Pyaara", "Woh Aankh Hi Kya", "Sexy Sexy Mujhe Log Bole", etc. According to the Indian trade website Box Office India, with around 2,800,000 units sold the soundtrack became the eighth highest-selling album of the year.

The Word “Sexy” in the Song “Sexy Sexy Mujhe Log Bole” was replaced with “Baby” due to criticism and controversy.

No.	Title	Lyrics	Singer(s)	Length
1.	"Tumsa Koi Pyaara"	Rahat Indori	Kumar Sanu, Alka Yagnik	6:16
2.	"Woh Aankh Hi Kya" (1)	Zameer Kazmi	Kumar Sanu, Alka Yagnik	7:02
3.	"Tere Deewane Ne"	Dev Kohli	Kumar Sanu, Alka Yagnik	6:35
4.	"Sexy Sexy Mujhe Log Bole (Baby Baby Mujhe Log Bole)"	Indeevar	Alisha Chinai, Anu Malik	7:57
5.	"Tum Mano Ya Na Mano"	Rahat Indori	Kumar Sanu, Alka Yagnik	7:35
6.	"Khat Likhna"	Rahat Indori	Alka Yagnik, Sonu Nigam	4:49
7.	"Raat Kya Maange"	Zafar Gorakhpuri	Alka Yagnik	7:06
8.	"Woh Aankh Hi Kya" (2)	Zameer Kazmi	Sonu Nigam	7:50

== Govinda's accident ==
Govinda narrowly escaped death on 5 January 1994 while travelling to a studio for the shooting of Khuddar. The actor's car collided with another car, resulting in him sustaining injuries to his head. Though bleeding profusely, Govinda did not cancel the shooting. After visiting a doctor, he shot for the film till midnight.
