= Pillaikkaga =

1989 Tamil action film directed by P. Vasu

- Poster
- Directed by: P. Vasu
- Written by: P. Vasu
- Produced by: Mohan Natarajan; Tharangai V. Shanmugam
- Starring: Prabhu; Gautami; Rekha
- Cinematography: K. B. Dayalan
- Edited by: P. Mohanraj
- Music by: Gangai Amaran
- Production company: Rajakaliamman Pictures
- Release date: 4 March 1989
- Country: India
- Language: Tamil

Pillaikkaga (transl. For the son) is a 1989 Indian Tamil-language action drama film written and directed by P. Vasu, produced by Mohan Natarajan and Tharangai V. Shanmugam under Rajakaliamman Pictures. The film, starring Prabhu, Gautami and Rekha was released on 4 March 1989.

== Cast ==
- Prabhu as Sangli Devan
- Gautami as Priya
- Rekha as Kannamma
- Rupini as Rupini
- Nassar as Doctor
- Mohan Natarajan
- R. Dilip
- Anandaraj as Nagadevan
- Devaraj
- Baby Dhivya Ravi
- Chinni Jayanth
- Pandu as Police Constable

== Soundtrack ==
The soundtrack was composed by Gangai Amaran who also wrote the lyrics .

Track listing
| No. | Title | Singer(s) | Length |
|---|---|---|---|
| 1. | "Iniya Vasanthame" | S. P. Balasubrahmanyam, K. S. Chithra | 4:13 |
| 2. | "Un Annai Naan" | K. J. Yesudas | 4:22 |
| 3. | "Mazhalayin" | Gangai Amaran, K. S. Chithra | 4:38 |
| 4. | "Thaye Unnidam" | K. S. Chithra | 4:54 |
| Total length: | | | 22:10 |

== Release and reception ==
Pillakkaga was released on 4 March 1989. The Indian Express wrote, "Imposing angles and neat and tangy cutting building up much interest and tension initially but it is overdose of sentiment that director P. Vasu plumps for in an attempt to woo women to his film."
