= Thottal Poo Malarum =

2007 film by P. Vasu

- Title card
- Directed by: P. Vasu
- Written by: P. Vasu
- Produced by: P. Vasu
- Starring: Sakthi Vasu; Gowri Munjal
- Cinematography: Akash Ashokkumar
- Edited by: KMK. Palanivel
- Music by: Yuvan Shankar Raja
- Production companies: Sapphire Media & Infrastructure
- Release date: 3 August 2007
- Running time: 146 minutes
- Country: India
- Language: Tamil

Thottal Poo Malarum (transl. The flower will bloom when touched) is a 2007 Indian Tamil-language romantic musical film written and directed by P. Vasu. It stars his son Sakthi Vasu, in his film debut, and Gowri Munjal in the lead roles. Rajkiran, Sukanya, Nassar, Vadivelu and Santhanam play supporting roles. The music was composed by Yuvan Shankar Raja. The film was released on 3 August 2007.

== Plot ==
Ravi Thiagarajan, a charismatic youngster, falls head over heels for Anjali, his college mate. Anjali's mother, Periyanayagi, a wealthy and assertive entrepreneur, keeps a close eye on her daughter, even escorting her to college in a car. To win Anjali's heart, Ravi showcases his singing talents, and Anjali, intrigued, attends his performance in disguise. However, Ravi surprisingly recognizes her and sings a song hinting at his discovery. Anjali is impressed by Ravi's perceptiveness and talent. Ravi further impresses Anjali by boldly participating in a wrestling match, where he defeats the two-time champion despite being a newcomer. Anjali begins to reciprocate Ravi's interest through subtle hints. She challenges Ravi to decipher her phone number, encoded in a series of pincode numbers. Ravi takes on the task and, after considerable effort, successfully deduces the number. Anjali is delighted and, as promised, agrees to confirm their relationship. Ravi publicly confesses his love for Anjali in front of their college peers.

Meanwhile, Ravi's paternal uncle, Kabaaleeswaran "Kabali Khan," returns from Bombay, where he has built a reputation as a gangster. Upon his return, Kabali gets entangled in a series of misadventures, including a car accident and being mistaken for a terrorist. Ravi's father, Thiagarajan, bails him out. Periyanayagi discovers Anjali's relationship with Ravi and warns Thiagarajan to keep his son away from Anjali. Ravi, determined to fight for his love, refuses to back down. In retaliation, Periyanayagi kidnaps Ravi's sister, forcing Thiagarajan to ask Ravi to distance himself from Anjali for the family's safety. However, Thiagarajan later motivates Ravi to pursue his love, revealing that he refused Periyanayagi's bribe and challenged her, vowing that Anjali would be his daughter-in-law. Anjali stands firm in her love for Ravi, while Periyanayagi arranges her marriage to her brother, Varadharaja Vaandaiyar's son, Rajasekar, in Bombay. Unbeknownst to Periyanayagi, Ravi learns of the plan through her secretary and decides to intervene.

In Bombay, Ravi meets his paternal uncle, Kabali Khan, and together they devise a plan to stop the marriage. Ravi kidnaps Vaandaiyar's granddaughter and then "rescues" her, gaining Vaandaiyar's trust and entry into his house. Ravi wins over Vaandaiyar's confidence and that of his family members, positioning himself to thwart the planned marriage and be with Anjali. Ravi executes his plan, "kidnapping" Anjali and informing Vaandaiyar, who rushes to rescue her. However, Anjali escapes and makes Vaandaiyar believe it was a false alarm. Ravi and Anjali secretly romanticize within the house, avoiding detection. With the marriage date approaching, tensions rise, and Vaandaiyar's rival gang, led by Balram Seth, plans an attack. During the sangeet night, Anjali attempts suicide, but Ravi stops her, promising to reveal their relationship to the family. The attack by Balram Seth's goons creates chaos, and Anjali inadvertently calls out Ravi for help and Vaandaiyar begins to suspect a connection between her and Ravi.

After defeating the goons, Vaandaiyar confronts Ravi. Anjali rushes to Ravi's aid, revealing their love to the entire family. With their relationship out in the open, Ravi confesses their love story to Vaandaiyar, including Periyanayagi's fake heart attack. Periyanayagi arrives in Bombay and opposes the relationship, citing Ravi's student status and lack of financial stability. Vaandaiyar advises Ravi to focus on his education and career, promising that Anjali won't be married off until Ravi returns with a stable future. Ravi accepts the challenge and leaves to pursue his studies. Years later, Ravi returns to Chennai as an MBA graduate, expecting to marry Anjali. However, he's shocked to find Anjali's baby shower function underway. The truth is finally revealed: Ravi's parents and Anjali's family had planned a surprise, and the function is actually for Ravi and Anjali's wedding. In the end, Ravi and Anjali tie the knot, surrounded by their loved ones.

== Cast ==
- Sakthi Vasu as Ravi Thiagarajan
- Gowri Munjal as Anjali
- Rajkiran as Varadharaja Vaandaiyar
- Vadivelu as Kabaaleeswaran "Kabali Khan", Ravi's uncle
- Nassar as Thiagarajan, Ravi's father
- Sukanya as Periyanayagi, Anjali's mother
- Santhanam as Ravi's friend
- Madhan Bob as Vaandaiyar's brother-in-law
- Ennatha Kannaiya as a car driver with low vision
- Mayilsamy as an auto driver in Arakkonam
- Thambi Ramaiah as Kabali Khan's gang member
- Supergood Lakshman as Manickaraj, librarian
- Cool Suresh as Ravi's friend
- Bonda Mani as Kabali Khan's gang member
- Pooja Gandhi as a dancer in the song "Vaadi Vambu Pennae" (Credited as Sanjana)
- Sriranjani as Ravi's mother
- Sangeetha Balan as Periyanayagi's secretary
- Chethan Cheenu as Rajasekar, Vaandaiyar's son
- Anand Kumar Murugan as Balram Seth's son
- Scissor Manohar as Kabali Khan's gang member
- Suruli Manohar as Kabali Khan's gang member
- K. S. Ravikumar in a special appearance as a cab driver
- Mahanadi Shankar in a special appearance as a terrorist

== Production ==
Thottal Poo Malarum is the debut film for Sakthi Vasu, previously a child actor, in a leading role. Its title is derived from a song from Padagotti (1964).

== Soundtrack ==
For the music of the film, P. Vasu teamed up with composer Yuvan Shankar Raja for the first time. The soundtrack was released on 23 June 2007 by Rajinikanth and Kamal Haasan. Vaali wrote the lyrics for all the songs, except for "Kadatharen Naan Unnai", whose lyrics were written by Snehan. The song "Arabu Naade" became immensely popular and a chartbuster.

Song	Singers	Length	Lyrics
"Arabu Naade (Mugathai Eppodhum)"	Haricharan, Yuvan Shankar Raja	5:22	Vaali
"Vittal Suriyanai"	Ranjith, Yuvan Shankar Raja	4:38	Vaali
"Valaiyal Karangalai"	Vijay Yesudas	4:45	Vaali
"Ennai Pidicha"	Haricharan, Binni Krishnakumar	4:35	Vaali
"Vaadi Vambu Pennae"	Sujatha Mohan	4:09	Vaali
"Kadatharan Naan Unnai"	Rahul Nambiar, Saindhavi	3:48	Snehan

== Critical reception ==
TSV Hari of Rediff.com described the film as "very ordinary fare," adding that "Sakthi certainly deserved better." M Bharat Kumar of News Today called it a "mediocre offering" with "predictable sequences," noting that "the son seems to have delivered the goods well, while the father has failed as a director." Malathi Rangarajan of The Hindu wrote "When the sole mission is to promote the son, everything else pales into insignificance. Only that P. Vasu could have been more subtle in his campaign."

Chithra of Kalki praised the acting of Sakthi but felt his acting in serious scenes seems casual damaging the seriousness of the scenes while also panning Gowri's acting as wooden but praised the acting of Rajkiran and other actors and Vadivelu's humour and Akash's cinematography and added if first half was a snail train then second half was Shatabdi. Malini Mannath of Chennai Online wrote, "The script offers nothing new. It's yet again the routine love story with predictable happenings [..] But not much excitement here either. With the hero following his girl to Bombay, and trying to worm his way into the don's household and heart, it's again a sense of déjà vu. Surely, the director-father could have planned a better proposition for his son's debut".

== Legacy ==
The dialogue "Varum Aanaa Varaadhu" spoken by Ennathe Kannaiah became popular. The dialogue also inspired a song in Seemaraja (2018). It was used sardonically by politician M. K. Stalin at least twice, once in 2018 and once in 2021.
