= Walter Vetrivel =

1993 film by P. Vasu

- Poster
- Directed by: P. Vasu
- Written by: P. Vasu
- Produced by: Shanthi Vasudevan
- Starring: Sathyaraj; Sukanya; Ranjitha
- Cinematography: M. C. Sekar
- Edited by: P. Mohanraj
- Music by: Ilaiyaraaja
- Production company: Kamalam Movies
- Release date: 14 January 1993
- Running time: 150 minutes
- Country: India
- Language: Tamil

Walter Vetrivel is a 1993 Indian Tamil-language action film written and directed by P. Vasu. The film stars Sathyaraj, Sukanya and Ranjitha, with Vijayakumar, Goundamani, Nassar, Gandhimathi, Mohan Raj and Raj Chander in supporting roles. It revolves around a disciplined police officer who turns against his brother who has turned to crime.

Walter Vetrivel was released on 14 January 1993 and became a blockbuster commercial success, with a 200-day run in theatres. The film was later remade in Telugu as S. P. Parasuram, in Hindi as Khuddar, and in Kannada as Dalavayi, and in Bangla as Desh Daradi.

== Plot ==
Walter Vetrivel is an IPS officer. Sumathi is a dancer and a witness to a gang that films people being raped. Walter falls in love with Sumathi after seeing her helping disabled children. They are engaged to be married. But Walter's younger brother worries that Sumathi has seen him taking the photo while villains try to rape her. He tells the villains the place where Walter has hidden Sumathi. The villains beat Sumathi severely, and she goes blind. Walter still goes ahead and marries Sumathi.

Rayappa, a policeman under Walter, helps the villains escape from jail. Walter finds out that Rayappa is a liar, but Rayappa resigns from the police department. Rayappa becomes a minister later. Sumathi becomes pregnant and says that she will be unlucky to be able to see the child. The doctor says that she will see an expert doctor, and her sight will be restored. But Walter's brother is worried and adds poison in the milk to kill Sumathi, but Sumathi gives the milk to the child, and it dies.

Walter is appointed as special security for Rayappa for a stage speech. While Sumathi's operation is getting done, Walter knows villains will attack her again. He tells Rayappa that his wife's life in danger, so he needs to go to the hospital, but Rayappa starts a speech in the stage and humiliates Walter. Walter, instead of saluting in front of the public, beats Rayappa and tells of Rayappa's previous life as a corrupt police officer who now became a corrupt politician. Rayappa's coolie rowdies set fire to the stage, where Walter openly tells of Rayappa's previous life. After hearing everything, people support Walter.

Meanwhile, in the hospital, Sumathi's eye operation gets over. Before Sumathi's eye dressing gets opened, the villains come again to attack Sumathi, but Walter saves her after a big fight in a dark room where a villain tries to attack Walter with a torch. Finally, Walter throws the villain onto an electric panel in the room and kills him. Sumathi's eye bandage gets opened, and she regains her eyesight. She looks at a family photo and identifies the photographer who took a photo of the villain as Walter's brother.

Though Sumathi is sad knowing Walter's brother is on the villain's side, Walter is full of anger and tries to chase the brother. Enters the villain Swamy. Walter knocks down the fake Swamy and his henchmen. At the same time, Rayappa also gets a note from Walter. Walter gets hit on the head with a bar by the brother. Walter again chases the brother to the top of the building, where he holds a child hostage. Seeing no other way to save the child, Walter, being the honest cop as he is, shoots his brother in the head. The film ends with Walter carrying his brother's corpse.

== Cast ==
- Sathyaraj as Walter Vetrivel IPS
- Sukanya as Sumathi
- Ranjitha as Meena
- Vijayakumar as Viswanathan
- Goundamani as Royal Ramasamy
- Nassar as Rayappa
- Gandhimathi as Lakshmi/Periyamma
- Rocky as Duraisingam
- Mohan Raj as goon sent to kill Sumathi
- Ponnambalam as Kabali
- Raj Chandar as Sundar
- Prabhu Deva as special appearance in the song "Chinna Raasaavae"

== Production ==
After the success of Rickshaw Mama (1992), P. Vasu decided to make another film with Sathyaraj under his production banner Kamalam Films. Vasu narrated three stories and asked Sathyaraj to select any one; Sathyaraj selected the story with a police backdrop which became Walter Vetrivel. At the launch of the film, Rajinikanth clapped the shot, Vijayakanth directed the first shot and Prabhu switched on the camera. The title character was partly inspired by a real policeman named Walter Devaram. In 2020, Devaram said Vasu approached him seeking permission to use his name, but "there wasn't any need for such permission, as they didn't use my full name". Some scenes were shot at Rajaji Hall.

== Soundtrack ==
The soundtrack was composed by Ilaiyaraaja, with lyrics written by Vaali.

Song	Singer(s)	Duration
"Chinna Raasaavae"	Mano, S. Janaki	4:57
"Mannava Mannava Nee Mannadhi"	Sunanda	5:02
"Ovvoru Pakkam"	Swarnalatha	4:59
"Pattu Nila"	S. Janaki	5:08
"Poongaatru"	Mano, Uma Ramanan	5:03

== Release and reception ==
Walter Vetrivel was released on 14 January 1993. Malini Mannath of The Indian Express wrote, "Vasu's screenplay is etched to give maximum shock value [..] But the film is worth watching in the sense that despite flaws Vasu has managed to give a film that is different and gripping". K. Vijiyan of New Straits Times gave a positive review praising Vasu's direction and Sathyaraj's acting. C. R. K. of Kalki wrote that the sequences move at fast pace which makes viewers forget certain flaws. The film was a major commercial success, and ran for over 200 days in theatres. At the 14th Cinema Express Awards, Sathyaraj and Sukanya won in the Best Actor – Tamil and Best Actress Special Award categories respectively.
