= Etho Seithai Ennai =

2012 Indian film by J.Elvin Bosser

- Poster
- Directed by: J.Elvin Bosser
- Written by: J.Elvin Bosser
- Produced by: Aadi Sakthi
- Starring: Shakthi; Liyasree
- Cinematography: Ezhil Arasan
- Edited by: Mahalakshmi
- Music by: Ganesh B Kumar
- Production company: Adhi Sakthi Movies
- Release date: 17 August 2012
- Running time: 124 minutes
- Country: India
- Language: Tamil

Etho Seithai Ennai (transl. You did something to me) is a 2012 Indian Tamil-language romantic action film written and directed by debutante J.Elvin Bosser, starring Shakthi and Liyasree, while Anand, Anand Babu, Ilavarasu, John Vijay, and Srinath in supporting roles. It released on 17 August 2012 to negative reviews and became a box office disaster.

== Plot ==
Arjun falls in love with his classmate Shalini, who hails from a rich family. Shalini has a special bond with her uncle Nambi, a local don/businessman. Shalini prefers to marry someone her uncle chooses and maintains distance with Arjun. However, beyond a point, Shalini falls for Arjun, impressed by his true love. Nambi spots Shalini and Arjun together and gets furious, but Shalini convinces Nambi, and he accepts their love.

Suddenly, Arjun goes missing, and it is revealed that he was kidnapped by Veeru, Nambi's business rival, to get revenge on Nambi. Veeru contacts Nambi and threatens to kill Arjun if Nambi hands over some of the key business contracts to him. Nambi agrees to Veeru's orders as he wants Arjun to be safe. However, Nambi's true character is revealed, as he dislikes Arjun and Shalini's love affair. Nambi feels happy that Veeru has kidnapped Arjun and will kill him if Nambi does not turn up with documents, so that Shalini will believe that Veeru has killed Arjun, thereby maintaining Nambi's good image in front of Shalini. However, Arjun fights Veeru's goons, escapes, and meets Nambi, thereby informing Shalini of Nambi's true nature. Arjun and Shalini get married.

== Cast ==
- Shakthi as Arjun
- Liyasree as Shalini
- Anand as Nambi
- Anand Babu as Veeru
- Ilavarasu as Veeru's aide
- Srinath
- John Vijay as Kumar
- Devi Priya as Kumar's wife
- Bhanu Chander as Arjun's father
- Meera Krishnan as Arjun's mother
- Sai Prashanth as Seenu
- Mahanadhi Shankar

== Soundtrack ==
The soundtrack was composed by Ganesh B. Kumar.

- "Fallen In Love" - Tara Kumaravelu (written by Georgina)
- "Kadhil Mattum Inbamaa" - Krish, Shekinah Shawn (written by Divakar)
- "Muzhu Nilavu Ondru" - Abilash (written by Divakar)
- "Oh My Love" - Shalini Singh, Santhosh (written by Divakar)
- "Pogamal Orunalum" - Singer(s): Vijay Narain, Shruthi, Smruthi, Shrik (written by Mugil, Georgina [English chorus])

== Reception ==
The Times of India gave the film 1/5 stars and wrote, "Director Bosser does nothing to make the treatment refreshing and Etho Seithai Ennai ends up as something that can be given a pass."
