= Rebel (2012 film) =

2012 Indian film by Raghava Lawrence

- Theatrical release poster
- Directed by: Raghava Lawrence
- Written by: Raghava Lawrence
- Produced by: J. Bhagavan; J. Pulla Rao
- Starring: Prabhas; Tamannaah Bhatia; Deeksha Seth; Mukesh Rishi
- Cinematography: C. Ramprasad
- Edited by: Marthand K. Venkatesh
- Music by: Raghava Lawrence (songs); S. Chinna (score)
- Production company: Sri Balaji Cine Media
- Distributed by: Sri Venkateswara Creations (Nizam); 7 Seas (overseas); 14 Reels Entertainment (Krishna); N.V. Prasad (ceded)
- Release date: 28 September 2012
- Running time: 176 minutes
- Country: India
- Language: Telugu
- Box office: ₹44 crore

Rebel is a 2012 Indian Telugu-language action comedy film written and directed by Raghava Lawrence. The film stars an ensemble cast featuring Prabhas, Tamannaah Bhatia, Deeksha Seth, Krishnam Raju, Mukesh Rishi, K. C. Shankar, and Pradeep Rawat. It was produced by J. Bhaghawan and J. Pulla Rao under the Sri Balaji Cine Media banner. Lawrence also handled the dance choreography and soundtrack, while the background score was handled by S. Chinna.

Rebel was theatrically released worldwide on 28 September 2012. The film received mixed reviews from critics and underperformed at the box office despite a good opening, collecting a distributor's share of ₹27.3 crore and gross of around ₹44 crore.

== Plot ==
Rishi comes to Hyderabad, where a ruthless crime lord named Stephen has established an extensive illegal empire. Rishi discovers that Stephen’s shadowy partner, a mysterious international kingpin named Robert, is actually the assumed identity of his uncle, Jayram. Following Bhupathi's murder, Jayram had joined forces with Stephen, and the duo rapidly ascended to become the state's most powerful gangsters. Tracking their network, Rishi discovers that Stephen and Robert rely heavily on a trusted lieutenant named Nanu, who manages their operations from Bangkok.

Rishi travels to Bangkok and deliberately orchestrates a meeting with Nanu's daughter, Nandini. Over time, the two fall in love. When Nandini asks her father to see photos of his elusive employers on his phone, Rishi secretly looks at the screen and secures definitive visual proof that Robert is indeed Jayram. But after seeing Rishi beating up goons she asks him who he is. Rishi's bodyguards revel his past

Past: Rishi is the carefree son of Bhupathi, a powerful and benevolent ruler of a village who is deeply revered by the local community. Growing up under his father's significant influence, Rishi internalizes Bhupathi's noble ideals. Desiring a peaceful future for his son away from regional factionalism, Bhupathi sends Rishi to Bangalore to pursue higher education and master music. While studying there, Rishi falls in love with an orphaned woman named Deepali. Hoping to demonstrate to his father that he has successfully embraced a non-violent lifestyle, Rishi brings Deepali back to his ancestral home by introducing her as his elderly music teacher. However, during a major village festival, a corrupt politician named Simhadri dispatches a hundred thugs to assassinate Bhupathi's family. Forced to protect his home, Rishi breaches his peaceful vow and completely eliminates the attackers. Unbeknownst to the family, Bhupathi's estranged brother, Jayram, has harbored a deep resentment ever since Bhupathi permanently exiled Jayram's own son from the household. Seizing an opportunity for vengeance, Jayram conspires with Simhadri. In a brutal ambush, Jayram and his son murder Bhupathi, his wife Lakshmi, and Deepali. Before committing suicide out of fear, a cornered Simhadri confesses to Rishi that an influential, unnamed local underworld boss aided Jayram in orchestrating the massacre. Left with nothing but grief, Rishi rallies Bhupathi’s fiercely loyal personal bodyguards to embark on a meticulous mission of revenge.

Present: Deeply moved and horrified by the injustice, Nandini vows to assist Rishi in luring Stephen and Robert out of hiding. Rishi systematically bribes Nanu's security detail to abandon him, isolating and capturing the lieutenant. Through severe interrogation, Rishi forces Nanu to arrange a high-stakes meeting with his bosses. However, the cunning gangsters anticipate the ambush and send two body doubles in their place. Utilizing the distraction, the real Robert orchestrates a counter-attack, capturing Raju, Nandini, and Rishi's bodyguards. Rishi is captured and brought back to his ruined ancestral estate, where Robert forces him to watch his bodyguards and Raju get executed, leaving only Nandini alive. Stephen and an army of henchmen subject Rishi to a brutal beating. Fueled by years of suppressed rage, Rishi breaks free from his restraints and unleashes a devastating assault. He decimates the entire army of henchmen before systematically executing Stephen, Robert, and Robert's son, finally avenging the deaths of his parents and Deepali. With his family's honor restored and the cycle of vengeance closed, Rishi and Nandini reunite to build a life together.

== Cast ==
- Prabhas as Rishi alias "Rebel"
- Tamannaah Bhatia as Nandini
- Deeksha Seth as Deepali
- K. C. Shankar as Stephen
- Kelly Dorji as APC-MI6
- Mukesh Rishi as Jayaram alias Robert, Bhupathi's brother and Rishi's paternal uncle
- Krishnam Raju as Bhupathi, Rishi's father
- Prabha as Lakshmi, Rishi's mother
- Brahmanandam as Narasa Raju
- Ali as Kamal Haasan Shiv Shankar
- Pradeep Rawat as Simhadri
- Supreeth as Raju, Bhupathi's bodyguard
- Tej Sapru as Nanu, Nandini's father
- Vikram Singh as David
- Bharath Reddy as Jayaram's son
- M. S. Narayana as Shastri
- Ananth Babu as Shastri
- Ravi Nair as Sanjay
- Junior Relangi as Junior Shastri
- Sriman as Ajay
- Chalapathi Rao as a police officer
- Vincent Asokan as Varadan
- Jeeva as Shankar
- Kovai Sarala as Nandini's aunt
- Hema as Rishi's aunt
- Shanoor Sana as Nandini's friend
- Rajitha as Nandini's aunt

== Production ==
In December 2011, it was reported that the unit would go back to Bangkok to shoot some vital scenes and action sequences with Tamannaah and Prabhas.

After completing the schedule, the filming resumed at Pollachi where scenes on Prabhas and other lead cast were canned. The filming shifted to Pondicherry where action episodes involving Prabhas were shot. The last schedule of filming took at an aluminium factory in Hyderabad.

== Music ==
Rebel

Soundtrack album by Raghava Lawrence
- Released: 14 September 2012
- Recorded: 2012
- Genre: Feature film soundtrack
- Length: 21:53
- Language: Telugu
- Label: Aditya Music
- Producer: Raghava Lawrence

Raghava Lawrence chronology
Don (2007)	Rebel (2012)

Raghava Lawrence himself composed the songs while the film score was composed by S. Chinna. The soundtrack of the film was released through Aditya Music label on 14 September 2012 at Shilpakala Vedika in Hyderabad.

No.	Title	Lyrics	Singer(s)	Length
1.	"Keka"	Ramajogayya Sastry	Benny Dayal, Lloyd Paul, Sathyan, Naresh Iyer	4:09
2.	"Deepali"	Ramajogayya Sastry	Karthik, Priya Hemesh, Diya (Child) & Group	4:35
3.	"Google"	Bhaskarabhatla	Andrea, Sravana Bhargavi & Group	4:40
4.	"Orinayano"	Ramajogayya Sastry	Malathi, Vijay Prakash & Group	5:09
5.	"Excellent Nee Figure (Remix)"	Ramajogayya Sastry	Benny Dayal, Lloyd Paul, Sathyan, Naresh Iyer	3:20
Total length:				21:53

== Release ==
=== Distribution ===
It was announced that 7 Seas, a premier entertainment company, purchased the overseas theatrical distribution rights of the film. Tamil Nadu theatrical distribution rights were sold for ₹33 lakh.

== Reception ==
=== Critical reception ===
Rebel received mixed reviews, with praise for Prabhas and Tamannaah Bhatia's performances, action sequences, and production values, but criticism for its plot, screenwriting, and technical aspects.

Purnima Ranawat of NDTV wrote "Rebel serves up fare for the mass audience. The film will be definitely liked by Prabhas' fans. Watch it for the dancing talent of Tamannaah Bhatia and action skills of Prabhas." Radhika Rajamani of Rediff.com gave 1.5 out of 5 stars and wrote "Working with hardly any storyline, director Raghava Lawrence had made a film that is arduous to watch... Rebel is a movie for the masses and certainly not for the discerning audience."

Jeevi from Idlebrain.com gave 3 out of 5 stars and wrote "Rebel is an revenge-based action film. Prabhas is known as one of the best mass stars of Telugu cinema. Lawrence's movies are known to appeal to the raw senses of mass movie lovers. Rebel is no exception. Interval block is really good. Rebel has decent commercial elements and targeted at masses. Masses will like it.

== Dubbed versions ==
The film was dubbed into Malayalam with the same title. It was dubbed into Hindi as The Return of Rebel and in Tamil as Veerabali.
