= 7 Naatkal =

2017 film by Gautham VR

- Theatrical release poster
- Directed by: Gautham VR
- Written by: P. Vimal Kumar S.A.Ramakrishnan (Dialogues)
- Produced by: K. Karthik; K. Karthikeyan
- Starring: Shakthi Vasudevan; Prabhu; Ganesh Venkatraman; Nikesha Patel; Nassar; Angana Roy; Rajeev Govinda Pillai; M. S. Bhaskar
- Cinematography: M. S. Prabhu
- Edited by: M. Jesvin Prabu
- Music by: Vishal Chandrasekhar
- Production company: Million Dollar Movies
- Release date: June 2, 2017
- Running time: 142 minutes
- Country: India
- Language: Tamil

7 Naatkal (transl. 7 days) is a 2017 Indian Tamil language mystery thriller film directed by Gautham VR and written by P. Vimal Kumar. The film stars Shakthi and Nikesha Patel alongside an ensemble cast of Prabhu, Ganesh Venkatraman, Nassar, Angana Roy, Rajeev Govinda Pillai, and M. S. Bhaskar, among others, playing supporting roles. The music was composed by Vishal Chandrasekhar with cinematography done by M. S. Prabhu and editing by M. Jesvin Prabu. The film was released on 2 June 2017 to moderate success.

== Plot ==
The plot starts off with the murder of Jennifer (Angana Roy), a ballet dancer. Owing to evidence and assumptions, all fingers point to Siddharth (Rajeev Govinda Pillai), the son of Vijay Raghunath (Prabhu), a business tycoon. Vijay is worried over his son's future as the latter's engagement has been fixed. He seeks the help of his adopted son, Sai Prasad (Ganesh Venkatraman), a crime branch officer. Prasad starts investigating the issue with the help of his assistant, Bhaskar (M. S. Bhaskar).

The investigation takes them to Gautham Krishna (Shakthi Vasudevan), an RJ in a private FM station, and his neighbour Pooja (Nikesha Patel). Prasad is after a confidential DVD which was once possessed by Gautham's friend, who is no more. Knowing that the DVD is with Pooja, the henchmen set by Prasad kidnap her and start following Gautham's movements. Gautham, who gets a lead about Pooja from his pet Siberian Husky, Blackie, rescues her, and the two set out to solve the mystery of the case, with the help of Peter S. Kumar (Nassar), a former police officer.

== Cast ==
- Shakthi Vasudevan as Gautham Krishna
- Prabhu as Vijay Raghunath
- Ganesh Venkatraman as Sai Prasad
- Nikesha Patel as Pooja
- Nassar as Peter S. Kumar
- Angana Roy as Jennifer
- Rajeev Govinda Pillai as Siddharth Raghunath
- M. S. Bhaskar as Bhaskar
- Devadarshini as Gautham's sister
- Santhana Bharathi as Chief Minister
- Chinni Jayanth as P. K. Naidu
- Vishnu Balasubramanian
- Master Raghavan as Anush
- Baby Visishta Reddy as Srinidhi

== Production ==
In April 2016, it was announced that Shakthi would feature in a new film titled 7 Naatkal directed by his cousin Gautham and written by his uncle, Vimal. Production began the same month, with Nikesha Patel, Ganesh Venkatraman and Angana Roy revealed to have joined the cast. M. S. Prabhu joined the team as a cinematographer, while Vishal Chandrasekhar was signed on as the project's music composer. Contrary to reports, Ganesh claimed that he would portray a positive role and stated that the film would be a "racy thriller" which takes place over seven days as per the title. The first schedule was shot across Chennai, while the team also nurtured plans to shoot songs abroad.

== Soundtrack ==
The soundtrack was composed by Vishal Chandrasekhar, and lyrics written by Madhan Karky.

7 Naatkal

Soundtrack album by Vishal Chandrasekhar
- Released: 13 May 2017
- Length: 15:11
- Language: Tamil
- Label: TrendMusic
- Producer: Vishal Chandrasekhar

Vishal Chandrasekhar chronology
Brindavanam (2017)	7 Naatkal (2017)	Rangoon (2017)

Track listing
No.	Title	Singer(s)	Length
1.	"Pudichurukka Ponne"	T. Rajendar	3:19
2.	"Kadhar Kadavul"	Vijay Prakash, Sindhuri Vishal	4:00
3.	"Podu Zip"	Ranjith, M. M. Manasi	3:52
4.	"Theme Music"		4:00
Total length:			15:11

== Critical reception ==
The Times of India wrote, "7 Naatkal has its moments, especially in the first half, with a few light-hearted scenes which gradually build up to an engaging suspense drama." Sowmya Rajendran of The News Minute wrote, "The film struggles to entertain with flat comedy, badly constructed song sequences, and attempts to score on the emotional quotient with some blah sentimental scenes as well."
