= Speed Dancer =

- Directed by: Muppalaneni Shiva
- Produced by: TVD Prasad
- Starring: Raghava Lawrence; Monica Bedi
- Music by: Ramesh Vinayakam
- Release date: 18 June 1999
- Country: India
- Language: Telugu

Speed Dancer is a 1999 Indian Telugu-language dance action film directed by Muppalaneni Shiva and produced by TVD Prasad. The film stars Raghava Lawrence and Monica Bedi. It was released on 18 June 1999.

== Cast ==
- Raghava Lawrence as Seenu
- Monica Bedi as Monika
- Anand Babu
- Brahmanandam
- Kota Srinivasa Rao
- AVS
- Ranganath
- M. S. Narayana
- Ironleg Sastri
- Manorama as Durgamma
- Sangeeta
- Bandla Ganesh as Seenu's friend
- Jenny as Doctor
- Tirupathi Prakash as Seenu's friend
- Roja in a special appearance

== Production ==
Raghava Lawrence revealed that he accepted the offer to appear as the lead actor of a film for the first time at the insistence of TVD Prasad. Monica Bedi also was given a role in the film, owing to her friendship with Prasad. The film's comedy track was written by Satish Vegesna.

== Release ==
Prior to the film's release, actor Chiranjeevi helped promote the film and spoke highly of Lawrence's work in the film. The film was released on 18 June 1999 and did not perform well at the box office.
