= Aattanayagann =

- Poster
- Directed by: Krishnaram (a.k.a.)S.A.Ramakrishnan
- Written by: Krishnaram (a.k.a.)S.A.Ramakrishnan
- Produced by: K. Muralidharan; Swaminathan; T. S. Rangarajan
- Starring: Sakthi; Adithya; Remya Nambeeshan
- Cinematography: S. D. Vijay Milton
- Edited by: Harsha
- Music by: Srikanth Deva
- Production company: Lakshmi Movie Makers
- Release date: 17 December 2010
- Running time: 135 minutes
- Country: India
- Language: Tamil

Aattanayagann (transl. Man of the match) is a 2010 Indian Tamil-language masala film written and directed by debutante Krishnaram (a.k.a.)S.A.Ramakrishnan, starring Sakthi and Remya Nambeeshan in lead roles, while Nassar, Santhanam, Adithya, Ravi Kale, and Meera Vasudevan play supporting roles. The music was composed by Srikanth Deva with cinematography by S. D. Vijay Milton and editing by Harsha. The film was released on 17 December 2010 to negative reviews. The film also gained popularity with Remya Nambeesan appearing glamorous in the songs for the first time in her career.

== Plot ==
Lingam (Sakthi) leads life in his own way. He, along with his set of friends, go around town enjoying life. Lingam's father (Nassar) is against his ways and compares him with his elder brother Chandran (Adithya), who runs a software firm in Hyderabad and is caring towards the family. Lingam falls in love with Radhika (Ramya Nambeesan) and decides to make her sister Indira (Meera Vasudevan) enter wedlock with his brother. After their marriage, Chandran takes Indira to Hyderabad, but she comes across a startling truth that Chandran is a dreaded don in Andhra Pradesh and that he had hid this truth to his family. Lingam has to set things right. He promises Indira and Radhika that he would bring his brother back to right ways. A hindrance to his mission is Pettinaidu (Ravi Kale), who has a score to settle with Chandran. Does Lingam succeed in his mission or not forms the climax.

== Cast ==
- Sakthi as Lingam
- Ramya Nambeeshan as Radhika
- Santhanam as Lingam's friend
- Nassar as Lingam's father
- Adithya as Chandran
- Ravi Kale as Pettinaidu
- Meera Vasudevan as Indhira Chandran
- Ahuti Prasad
- Lollu Sabha Jeeva as Lingam's friend
- R. Sundarrajan as Lingam's grandfather who is also named Lingam
- Balu Anand
- Ashwini
- Sachu
- G. V. Sudhakar Naidu
- Narsing Yadav
- Halwa Vasu
- Nellai Siva
- Bava Lakshmanan
- Devaki
- V. Swaminathan

== Production ==
The film marked the directorial debut of Krishnaram who earlier assisted Vikraman.

== Soundtrack ==
Soundtrack was composed by Srikanth Deva.

No.	Song	Singers	Lyrics
1	"Aatatha Paaru"	Megha, Naveen	Krishnaram
2	"Chekka"	Udit Narayan, Anuradha Sriram	Vaali
3	"Lakkadi"	Shankar Mahadevan	Vaali
4	"Onnarooba"	Velmurugan	Viveka
5	"Pattampoochi"	Karthik, Sadhana Sargam	Vaali
6	"Vaarthaiyala"	Haricharan	Vaali

== Reception ==
Sify wrote "On the whole the film is ham-fisted and does not deliver the punch required from a mass masala." Behindwoods wrote "Aatta Nayagan might not be the best time pass entertainer you will stumble upon in movies but if you want to give the quintessential masala potboiler a chance once again, performed by an up and coming actor for once as opposed to the established ones, you might like the movie."
