= Sivalinga (2017 film) =

- Theatrical release poster
- Directed by: P. Vasu
- Written by: P. Vasu
- Based on: Shivalinga (Kannada) By P. Vasu
- Produced by: R. Ravindran
- Starring: Raghava Lawrence; Shakthi Vasudevan; Ritika Singh
- Cinematography: Sarvesh Murari
- Edited by: Suresh Urs
- Music by: S. S. Thaman
- Production company: Trident Arts
- Distributed by: Across Films
- Release date: 14 April 2017
- Running time: 156 minutes
- Country: India
- Language: Tamil

Sivalinga is a 2017 Indian Tamil-language horror mystery thriller film directed by P. Vasu, starring Raghava Lawrence, Shakthi Vasudevan and Ritika Singh with Vadivelu and Urvashi in supporting roles.

It is a remake of Vasu's earlier 2016 Kannada film of the same name which starred Shiva Rajkumar, the project began production in July 2016 and finished in January 2017.

== Plot ==
Raheem and his well-trained pigeon Saara are alone in a coach aboard a train when a blind man enters and reaches an open door. Raheem saves the man, but the man turns out to be a hitman and pushes Raheem off the moving train to his death. Raheem's death is ruled a suicide, but Raheem's fiancée, Sangeetha, knows that Raheem had no reason to kill himself. The same night, Raheem appears in Sangeetha's dream and says that he was murdered. The following day, Raheem's case is forwarded to the CBCID at Sangeetha's request.

Shivalingeshwaran aka Shiva is a strict CID officer married to a thrill-seeker named Sathya. The two live in a house that is near a cemetery. Shiva is assigned to Raheem's case and begins the investigation. The same night, Sathya sees a ghost of a child and is frightened. However, Shiva cannot see the ghost and thinks Sathya is imagining it. Then he appoints Pattukunjam, a thief who comes to that house as a servant and night watchman. The following day, Shiva visits Raheem's home to investigate Raheem's relationship with his father and Sangeetha. Shiva suspects Sangeetha's father, Krishnamoorthy, is responsible for Raheem's death as he disapproves of Raheem & Sangeetha's love, only to find out that he has nothing to do with Raheem's death.

Sathya's behaviour becomes erratic. She travels around the city in search of someone, and she's redecorated the house with green curtains and lights and has cooked biryani, even though she has no experience in cooking. Pattukunjam and a few other maids inform Shiva about Sathya's strange behaviour. Shiva meets his friend and psychiatrist, Ashok, who advises Shiva to secretly observe her behaviour. That night, Shiva returns home early. He hears a man's voice and smells a cigar burning. He heads to Sathya's room and is shocked to discover that Raheem's soul has possessed Sathya's body. Raheem warns Shiva that he must solve Raheem's murder.

Shiva accesses the security footage at the railway station and discovers that a person who was acting as a blind man is the killer. Shiva tracks down the killer and chases him, finally cornering him on a train coach with no passengers. Sathya, who is still possessed by Raheem, enters and demands to know why the man killed him. The man tries to escape by jumping out of the moving train, but falls to his death. Shiva takes Sathya to a Darga, informing only Sathya's mother, Sarala, about what has been happening. Baba helps them to exorcise Raheem's soul, but only temporarily. He tells Shiva that solving Raheem's case is the only solution for saving Sathya.

Shiva starts the investigation piece by piece, and Raheem's pigeon, Saara, helps by giving clues. Shiva interrogates Sathya at the CID Conference Hall about Raheem. It is then revealed that Raheem recovered Sathya's stolen iPad and returned it to her. Raheem refuses to even tell his name, so Sathya clicks a picture of him for the sake of his noble gesture. Sathya's stalker college mate sees this and feels jealous. So he calls Sathya's residential landline, and when her father, Viswanathan, answers, he deliberately plants the false information that Sathya and Raheem are planning to elope and marry. Hearing this, Viswanathan hires David, an assassin, to injure and cripple Raheem.

After revealing the truth about the mistaken identity, Raheem's ghost possesses Sathya and threatens everyone present in the hall. Sathya's father begs for his forgiveness and says that he intended to only harm Raheem, not kill him. Shiva also begs Raheem to leave Sathya's body and asks Raheem to possess him instead, promising to show the killer. Then, it is revealed that a pigeon race organiser discovered David's assignment to injure Raheem and paid more money to David to kill him since Raheem and Saara are his nemeses in the pigeon race, and the duo always wins. The organiser is insulted by his friends for his incompetence. The possessed Shiva kills all the henchmen while allowing Raheem to exit his body and possess and kill the pigeon race organiser. In the end credits, Shiva and a pregnant Sathya reunite.

== Cast ==
- Raghava Lawrence as Shivalingeswaran, a CBI officer
- Shakthi Vasudevan as Raheem (credited as Shakthivel Vasu)
- Ritika Singh as Sathyabama (voice dubbed by Savitha Reddy)
- Vadivelu as Pattukunjam
- Urvashi as Arusuvai Annalakshmi
- Radharavi as Krishnamurthy
- Santhana Bharathi as Abdullah
- Jayaprakash as Viswanathan
- VTV Ganesh as N. Murali
- Bhanupriya as Sarala
- Saipriya Deva as Sangeetha
- Pradeep Rawat as Baba
- Zakir Hussain as Pigeon Race Organizer and the Main culprit in Raheem's Murder
- Madhuvanti Arun as CID Chief
- Sivashankar as Arusuvai Annalakshmi's assistant
- Bharathi
- Danny Kuttappa as David
- Shyam Prasad
- P. Vasu in a cameo appearance in song "Saarah Saarah"

== Production ==
Following the success of P. Vasu's Kannada horror film, Shivalinga (2016), the filmmaker chose to remake the project in Tamil. Vasu initially tried to market the project as Chandramukhi 2, as a spiritual sequel to Chandramukhi (2005), and approached Rajinikanth to portray the lead role. However, the actor did not accept to work on the project, while reports suggested that Vasu may approach Ajith Kumar for the film. In March 2016, Raghava Lawrence accepted to work on the film, while Vadivelu was also signed on to appear in a role thereafter. After negotiations with Anushka Shetty and Hansika Motwani, Vasu chose to sign on Ritika Singh for the female lead role. Vasu's son, Shakthi was also added to the cast to reprise the role he had portrayed in the original version. Shakthi revealed that his character would have more prominence in the Tamil version, in comparison with the Kannada version.

The film was launched in a ceremony during mid July 2016, with Radharavi, Bhanupriya and Urvashi revealed to be a part of the cast. The film's first schedule was completed in Chennai during August 2016. The film ended up being a commercial success, a huge comeback for Lawrence and director P. Vasu.

== Soundtrack ==
The soundtrack was composed by S. Thaman.

Sivalinga

Soundtrack album by S. Thaman
- Released: 2017
- Genre: Film soundtrack
- Length: 21:22
- Label: Zee Music Company
- Producer: S. Thaman

S. Thaman chronology
Jaguar (2016)	Sivalinga (2017)	Winner (2017)

All lyrics are written by Viveka.

No.	Title	Music	Singer(s)	Length
1.	"Chinna Kabali"	S. S. Thaman	Shankar Mahadevan, Naveen, Arunraja Kamaraj	4:37
2.	"Sirika Vechu"	S. S. Thaman	Vijay Yesudas, Ramya Behra	4:17
3.	"Rangu Rakkara"	S. S. Thaman	Anirudh Ravichander, Geetha Madhuri	4:29
4.	"Sivalinga"	S. S. Thaman	Usha Uthup, Kalpana, Sri Krishna	3:42
5.	"Saarah Saarah"	S. S. Thaman	Rahul Nambiar	4:17

== Reception ==
The Hindustan Times gave the film a two out of five star review.
