= Saadhu (film) =

1994 film by P. Vasu

- Theatrical release poster
- Directed by: P. Vasu
- Written by: P. Vasu
- Produced by: Meera Vidyasagar
- Starring: Arjun; Raveena Tandon
- Cinematography: M. C. Sekar
- Edited by: P. Mohan Raj
- Music by: Ilaiyaraaja
- Production company: Eashwara Chandra Combines
- Release date: 22 July 1994
- Running time: 130 minutes
- Country: India
- Language: Tamil

Saadhu (transl. Naive) is a 1994 Indian Tamil-language action film written and directed by P. Vasu, starring Arjun and Raveena Tandon, with Vijayakumar, Goundamani and Radha Ravi in supporting roles. The film marked the debut of Raveena Tandon in Tamil cinema. It was released on 22 July 1994 and became a hit at the box office.

== Plot ==
Sathyamoorthy lives with his mother and grandfather in the Boat Club area. He earns a degree with first class honors. A notorious local rowdy, Narayanan, eyes the property where Sathyamoorthy lives, and trouble begins when his son threatens Sathyamoorthy’s family. After a violent confrontation, Sathyamoorthy’s grandfather dies, and he and his mother are forced to relocate.

In their new surroundings, Sathyamoorthy’s mother finds work and encourages him to find better prospects. Later events involve riots, wrongful arrest, and struggles with local criminal factions. Sathyamoorthy eventually decides to confront the gang to end the violence, encouraging reform through political candidacy before uncovering further betrayals and ultimately facing justice.

== Cast ==
- Arjun as Sathyamoorthy (Sakthi)
- Jayabharathi as Sathyamoorthy's mother
- Raveena Tandon as Selvi
- Vijayakumar as Master
- Goundamani as Anjukolai Aarumugam/Aarukolai Aarumugam
- Radha Ravi as Vibhuthi Veeramuthu
- Rajeev as Police Inspector Krishnamoorthi
- Sethu Vinayagam as Minister Neelakandan
- Mohan Raj as Narayanan
- Kavitha as Police commissioner
- Y. Vijaya as Narayanan's wife

== Soundtrack ==
The soundtrack was composed by Ilaiyaraaja, with lyrics by Vaali.

Track listing
No.	Title	Singers	Length
1.	"Ammamma Unnai"	K. J. Yesudas	4:44
2.	"Ithayame Oh"	K. S. Chithra	6:35
3.	"Oorariya Pereduththa"	Mano, K. S. Chithra	5:00
4.	"Padikirom"	Mano, Swarnalatha, Arunmozhi	5:40
5.	"Vitta Mochile"	Mano, Swarnalatha	4:54
Total length:			26:53

== Reception ==
Malini Mannath of The Indian Express wrote "Vasu has managed to infuse freshness in his screenplay and keeps the viewer's attention engaged for most of the time". R. P. R. of Kalki praised Arjun's performance and Rajeev's characterisation but panned the film for showing violence and then ending the film with a message against non-violence.
