= Shivalinga (2016 film) =

- Theatrical release poster
- Directed by: P. Vasu
- Written by: V. Nagendra Prasad; P. Vasu
- Screenplay by: P. Vasu
- Story by: P. Vasu
- Produced by: K. A. Suresh
- Starring: Shiva Rajkumar; Vedhika; Shakthi Vasudevan
- Cinematography: P. K. H. Das
- Edited by: Suresh Urs
- Music by: V. Harikrishna
- Production company: Jayanna Combines
- Distributed by: Jayanna Combimes; Reliance Entertainment; Dream Eye Studios; Kasturi Media
- Release date: February 12, 2016 (India)
- Running time: 151 minutes
- Country: India
- Language: Kannada

Shivalinga is a 2016 Indian Kannada-language horror thriller film written and directed by P. Vasu. The film stars Shiva Rajkumar, Vedhika and Shakthi Vasudevan with Sadhu Kokila and Urvashi in supporting roles. Produced by K. A. Suresh, the film's music is composed by V. Harikrishna. The film's cinematography and editing was handled by PKH Das and Suresh Urs respectively. The film revolves around Rahim who died a mysterious death.

The film which began production in 2014 was released on 12 February 2016 to positive reviews and became successful at box-office. The climax of the film was reported to be taken straight out of an Agatha Christie novel.

Vasu remade the film in Tamil in 2017 with the same title starring Raghava Lawrence whose climax revelation scene was reported to have similarities with director's own 1999 film Malabar Police. lt was dubbed in Hindi and Odia by same name. This was reported to be Shivarajkumar's consecutive 40th original movie since he announced he won't do remakes in 2003.

== Plot ==
Raheem and his well-trained pigeon Saara are travelling alone in an empty coach aboard a train. A blind man who is also in the coach looks for a toilet but is nearing the open exit mistaking it for the toilet and nearly falls out. Raheem saves the man, who is really a paid killer, he throws Raheem off the moving train to his death which is witnessed by his pigeon, Saara. Raheem's death is wrongly ruled a suicide by the transport police. Raheem's fiancée Sangeetha knows that Raheem had no reason to kill himself and kicks up a fuss so that his death is further investigated. That same night, Raheem appears in Sangeetha's dream and tells her that he was murdered. The following day, Raheem's case is forwarded to the CID at Sangeetha's request, and Shiva is asked to head the investigation. Shiva is a strict officer who is married to a thrill-seeker named Satyabhama. The two move to Mysore and stay at a house overlooking a cemetery. Shiva begins the investigation into the death of Raheem. The same night, Satyabhama sees a ghost of a child and is frightened by this. Shiva, however, does not see the ghost and thinks that she is hallucinating. The following day, he visits Raheem's home to enquire about his relationship with Sangeetha and her father. Shiva suspects Sangeetha's father to be responsible for Raheem's death.

Meanwhile, Satyabhama's behaviour becomes erratic. She drives around the city frequently, redecorates the house with green curtains and lights and even cooks biryani, though she has never made the dish before. Later, a house servant tells Shiva about her strange behavior. Shiva meets his friend Ashok, who is a psychiatrist. He advises Shiva to observe her behaviour secretly. That night, Shiva returns home early. He hears a man's voice and smells a cigar burning. He heads to Satyabhama's room and is shocked to discover that Raheem's soul has possessed her body. Raheem warns Shiva that he must solve Raheem's murder.

Shiva accesses the security footage at the Bangalore railway station and discovers that the blind man is the killer. He concludes that the man, David, only faked blindness to kill Raheem. He tracks him and chases him before cornering him on a train coach with no passengers. Satyabhama, still possessed by Raheem, enters and demands to know the motive behind his killing from David, who tries to escape by jumping out of the moving train, only to fall to his death. Shiva takes Satyabhama to a dargah, informing only her mother about her condition. A demonologist helps them send Raheem's soul out of her body but tells them that it is temporary. He tells Shiva that solving Raheem's case is the only way to save Satya completely.

Shiva resumes the investigation, with Saara helping him by giving him clues. He interrogates Satyabhama at the CID conference hall regarding Raheem. Satyabhama reveals that Raheem retrieved her iPad, which is stolen by a thief on a bus, who unbeknown to her is chased by Raheem. Raheem retrieves her iPad and tries to return it. When Raheem finally gives back her iPad outside her college, she takes his picture for the sake of friendship. Her classmate Rahul who secretly loves Satyabhamal, but is always ignored by her, witnesses this and out of jealousy and wanting to ruin her life, makes a call pretending to be Raheem on her landline asking her to meet him at a particular location. Satyabhama's father, who was already spying on Satyabhama, answers the call which makes him angry and he decides to kill the innocent Raheem. After unveiling the truth, Raheem's ghost possess Satyabhama's father and kills him instantaneously.

== Cast ==
- Shiva Rajkumar as Shiva, a CID officer
- Vedhika as Satyabhama
- Shakthi Vasudevan as Raheem (credited as Shakthivel Vasu)
- Sadhu Kokila as Bill Gates, thief-turned house servant
- Urvashi as Anusuya, Shiva's mother
- Ashok as Vishwanath, Satyabhama's father
- Avinash as Krishna Bhat, Sangeetha's father
- Vinaya Prasad as Sarala, Satyabhama's mother (credited as Vinaya Prakash)
- Bharath Kalyan as Dr. Surya, psychiatrist
- Cudavalli Chandrashekar as R. Chandrashekhar, police officer
- Danny Kuttappa as David
- Pradeep Rawat as Baba
- K. S. Sridhar as Kareem Khan, Raheem's father (credited as ETV Sridhar)
- M. S. Umesh as cook (credited as Umeshanna)
- Vaishali Deepak as Sangeetha
- Malavika Avinash as Commissioner of Police
- K. V. Manjayya (uncredited)
- P. Vasu in a cameo appearance in song "Yethara Yethara"

== Production ==
Initially, Bhavana of Jackie fame was selected to be the leading lady. However, she could not take up the project because of her Malayalam film commitments. Later Vedhika was selected as lead actress. Shivarajkumar is said to be appearing in the role of a CID Officer. The film was launched on 15 December 2014 at Kanteerava Studios. The first schedule of the film was completed at Ulsoor. Vijay Raghavendra was the initial choice for the role which later went on to be portrayed by Shakthi Vasudevan.

== Music ==
Shivalinga

Soundtrack album by V. Harikrishna
- Released: 27 November 2015
- Recorded: 2015
- Genre: Feature film soundtrack
- Length: 20:27
- Label: D Beats
- Producer: V. Harikrishna

V. Harikrishna composed the background score for the film and its soundtrack. The soundtrack album consists of five tracks. It was released on 27 November 2015 in Bengaluru.

Track list
No.	Title	Lyrics	Singer(s)	Length
1.	"Betegaara"	V. Nagendra Prasad	Ramya NSK	3:27
2.	"Bombe"	V. Nagendra Prasad	Karthik, Vani Harikrishna	3:52
3.	"Do Something"	V. Nagendra Prasad	Tippu, Megha	4:05
4.	"Upakaara"	V. Nagendra Prasad	Javed Ali, Archana Ravi	4:28
5.	"Yethara Yethara"	V. Nagendra Prasad	Vijay Prakash	4:35

== Remake ==
In May 2016, P. Vasu announced plans to remake the film in Tamil under the same name. Raghava Lawrence, Ritika Singh and Vadivelu with Shakti Vasudevan and Urvashi reprising their roles in this version.

== Box office ==
The film had grossed over ₹35 crore in Indian box office and had completed 50 days in 110 theatres and 100 day-run in a dozen theatres.
