= Kelly Dorji =

Bhutanese actor (born 1971)

- Born: Kalden Sonam Dorji; 4 January 1971 (age 55)
- Occupations: Actor, model, artist
- Parents: Paljor Dorji (father); Louise Dorji (mother)

Kelly Dorji, is a Bhutanese actor and artist. He is the Honorary Consul of the UK in Bhutan, owns a travel company and is the Director of The Bhutan Echoes Literature and Arts Festival and the First Bhutan Fashion Week.

== Early life ==
Dorji's father is Lynpo Paljor Dorji, widely known as Dasho Benji, the permanent advisor to Bhutan's National Environment Commission. His mother is Louise Dorji, an author of children's books and a founding member of Bhutan Broadcasting Service (BBS). Dorji attended St. Paul's School in Darjeeling and Sherubtse College in eastern Bhutan. He earned an honors degree in history at St. Xavier's College in Mumbai. Dorji's grandfather was Bhutanese Prime Minister Jigme Palden Dorji. Dorji is a member of the Dorji Family of Bhutan and descendant of the Sikkim Royal Family.

== Career ==
=== Modeling ===
Kelly Dorji rose to prominence as a fashion model in the late-1990s and early 2000s in India. He worked as a runway model in India for designers such as Shahab Durazi, JJ Valaya, Arun Khanna, Rohit Bal, and Tarun Tahiliani and as a print model in London for Models Out of Town. Dorji hosted English television show 'Star Biz' for Star TV with co-anchor Lisa Ray.

=== Acting ===
Kelly Dorji has acted in almost 30 films over the course of his career. He made his acting debut in 2005 as the main antagonist opposite Ajay Devgan and Bobby Deol in Mani Shankar's Tango Charlie. In 2008, Dorji moved to the Telugu film industry where he gained recognition for films such as the 2007 action hit Don opposite Nagarjuna and Ek Ka Dum opposite Mahesh Babu. Dorji has also been influential in boosting the popularity of Bhutanese films in his own country with the release of his Dzongkha film Sem Gawai Tasha in 2011.

Dorji is well known for his own film stunts, much of which were self-choreographed. He also designed sequences for pageants, and assisted choreographer Lubna Adam. After a near death accident in 2013, Dorji limits his stunt work in films but continues to act. Kelly has recently made a come back to acting focused on content based work. He can be seen as John Gupta on Netflix's Delhi Crime Season 3 https://www.netflix.com/title/81076756

=== Art ===
Kelly Dorji is a painter and photographer. He has studied painting with a number of artists including Elsie Evans, Sidharth, and Karma Wangdi. He studied photography with fashion photographer Chien-Wien Lee. Dorji exhibits his work at contemporary art gallery Gray Area in Thimphu, Bhutan.

== Personal life ==
Dorji is divorced and He currently lives in Thimphu, Bhutan. He owns a luxury travel company, Terton Travel Bhutan.

=== Service ===
Kelly Dorji serves as the Honorary Consul of the UK in Bhutan.

Dorji supports the Bhutanese contemporary life through services with https://www.tarayanafoundation.org/ and he serves as the director of the https://www.drukyul.org/

== Filmography ==
Year	Film	Role	Language
2005	Netaji Subhas Chandra Bose: The Forgotten Hero	Hideki Tojo	Hindi
2005	Tango Charlie	Bodo Militant Leader	Hindi
2005	Khamoshh... Khauff Ki Raat	Criminal	Hindi
2005	Chocolate	Roshan Abbas	Hindi
2005	Fareb	Inspector Kelly Dorji	Hindi
2005	Ek Ajnabee	Bangkok Police Officer Kelly	Hindi
2007	Don	Stephen / Feroz	Telugu
2008	Mukhbiir		Hindi
2008	King	Cameo appearance	Telugu
2009	Drona	Sarkar	Telugu
2009	Billa	Rashid	Telugu
2010	Aasal	Brijesh Shetty	Tamil
2010	Kedi	Victor	Telugu
2010	Lahore	Gajanan	Hindi
2010	Golimaar	Khalid	Telugu
2010	Krantiveer – The Revolution		Hindi
2010	Sem Gawai Tasha	Pilot	Dzongkha
2011	Badrinath	Sarkar	Telugu
2011	Dhada	Kelly	Telugu
2011	The Lost Gold of Khan	Pao	English
2012	Rebel	APC-MI6	Telugu
2013	Baadshah	Saadhu Bhai	Telugu
2014	1: Nenokkadine	Antonio Rosarius	Telugu
2014	Power	Nayak	Kannada
2014	Brother of Bommali		Telugu
2014	Ambareesha	RDX	Kannada
2015	Edavappathy		Malayalam
2024	Blackout	Mr. X	Hindi
2025	Delhi Crime (season 3)	John Gupta	Hindi
