= Don (2007 film) =

2007 Telugu film by Raghava Lawrence

- Movie poster
- Directed by: Raghava Lawrence
- Screenplay by: Raghava Lawrence
- Story by: Raghava Lawrence
- Dialogues by: Abburi Ravi
- Produced by: M. L. Kumar Chowdary
- Starring: Nagarjuna; Anushka; Raghava Lawrence; Nikita Thukral; Kelly Dorji
- Cinematography: S. Gopal Reddy
- Edited by: Marthand K. Venkatesh
- Music by: Raghava Lawrence; Chinna
- Production company: Sri Keerthi Creations
- Release date: 20 December 2007
- Running time: 154 mins
- Country: India
- Language: Telugu

Don is a 2007 Indian Telugu-language action drama film written and directed by Raghava Lawrence. Produced by M. L. Kumar Chowdary under the Sri Keerthi Creations banner, the film features Nagarjuna in the lead role, alongside Anushka, Lawrence, Kelly Dorji, and Nikita. Lawrence also made his debut as a music composer with this film. The film has emerged as a Blockbuster at the box office, grossing ₹59 crore worldwide on a ₹26 crore budget. The film has also earned a strong worldwide distributor share of ₹36 crore, second highest ever for a Telugu film.

The film was released on 20 December 2007. It was later dubbed into Hindi as Don No. 1 in 2008 and in Tamil under the same title. Additionally, it was remade in other languages, including Bangladeshi as Don Number 1 (2012) and Oriya as Don (2010).

== Plot ==
1987: Surya, also known as Suri, escapes from the police after avenging his parents’ murder by killing the gangster responsible. During his escape, he encounters a drug dealer exploiting young boys to sell drugs. Raghava, one of the boys, resists the dealer's demands, fearing police apprehension. In response, the drug dealer begins tormenting Raghava. Suri intervenes by killing the dealer, and Raghava, impressed by Suri's actions, expresses his desire to join him. The other boys follow suit, forming a close bond with Suri and eventually becoming his loyal allies.

2007: Suri, now a benevolent don with a golden heart, rules the underworld of Andhra Pradesh alongside his trusted lieutenant and sworn brother, Raghava. Together, they not only maintain control but also assist the police in dismantling corrupt activities. Meanwhile, Stephen, a ruthless don from Mumbai, seeks to expand his criminal empire into Andhra Pradesh. Known for his brutality, Stephen had earlier killed a rival don in Goa under gruesome circumstances, taking the rival's wife as a concubine and seizing control of the region. To gather intelligence on the local underworld, Stephen sends his henchman, S. P. Bhushan, to learn more about the state's dominant don.

No one in the police department knows who the traitor is, and Bhushan is appointed by the Inspector General of Police (I.G.) to handle Stephen's case. Bhushan approaches every influential person in the state. All except Seshu—an industrialist in a pharmaceutical company and Suri's former business partner—reject Stephen's proposal. After Suri learns this, Seshu is killed by Suri's men. Later, Bhushan rapes and kills a minister's daughter whom he had seen during the meeting with the minister. In retaliation, Suri kills Bhushan in a pub. To protect Suri, Raghava and the public spread the story that the rape victim killed Bhushan in self-defense. Eventually, Suri reveals the truth about Bhushan, reconciles with the I.G., and advises him that every officer in the department should be verified to ensure they are not corrupt, traitors, or spies. The I.G. seeks forgiveness, and Suri forgives him.

Meanwhile, in Mumbai, Anthony informs Stephen of Bhushan's death, making Stephen realize how powerful Suri is. Stephen tells Anthony he wants Suri to come to Mumbai, but Suri's senior henchman Banerji forces Stephen to come to Andhra Pradesh instead. In a meeting, Suri refuses to work with Stephen and warns him never to set his eyes on the state again.

Enraged, Stephen makes several attempts to kill Suri, but his men are eliminated. Rathnam, who wants revenge on Raghava for killing his son during a college drug incident (shown in a flashback), shelters Stephen in Hyderabad. Rathnam attempts bomb blasts and attacks against Suri, but Raghava kills him. Suri tells Stephen that he foiled Rathnam's plans within 1 hour and 30 minutes—well before Stephen's 2-hour deadline to save the public.

Meanwhile, Suri falls in love with Priya. Though she initially dislikes him, she later realizes he is a good person and reciprocates his love. Raghava also falls in love with a girl named Nandhini, who appears to accept his feelings. However, she is later revealed to be Stephen's henchwoman. Enraged by her betrayal, Raghava shoots Nandhini in the head, kills her, and warns Stephen that Suri will kill him. In retaliation, Stephen kills Raghava.

In a final confrontation, Stephen returns Raghava's corpse and challenges Suri to a fight under the condition that Suri would lose two of his men for every fall he takes. Angered and heartbroken, Suri accepts. During the combat, Suri loses two men, including Anthony. Determined to win, Suri fights fiercely, thrashes Stephen, and then fights and kills his two henchwomen. The wife of the slain don of Goa claps for Suri and urges him to kill Stephen, as Stephen had destroyed her life by murdering her husband. The fight ends with Suri killing Stephen, avenging crimes of killing people, including Raghava's death. Suri then warns Stephen's remaining henchmen not to follow their boss's path. Finally, Suri emerges as the unopposed don of India.

== Cast ==
- Nagarjuna as Surya "Suri"
- Anushka Shetty as Priya
- Raghava Lawrence as Raghava, Surya's sworn brother
- Nikita Thukral as Nandhini
- Kelly Dorji as Stephen
- Chetan Hansraj as Anthony, Stephen's henchman
- Kota Srinivasa Rao as Rathnam, Surya's former business partner
- Nassar as I.G. Shankar Pandey
- Chalapathi Rao as Murthy, Priya's father
- Supreeth as a Bihari goon
- Salim Baig as Robin
- Jeeva as Banerji, Surya's henchman
- Amit Tiwari as Rathnam's son
- Madhusudhan Rao as a drug dealer
- Vizag Prasad as Seshu
- Bharath Reddy as a bomb expert in Stephen's gang

== Music ==
Don

Soundtrack album by Raghava Lawrence
- Released: 2007
- Recorded: 2007
- Genre: Soundtrack
- Length: 26:30
- Label: Aditya Music
- Producer: Raghava Lawrence

Raghava Lawrence chronology
Don (2007)	Rebel (2012)

The music was composed by Raghava Lawrence. Audio soundtrack was released on Aditya Music label.

No.	Title	Lyrics	Singer(s)	Length
1.	"Su Su Suriyanna"	Chinni Charan	Shankar Mahadevan	4:25
2.	"Inthandanga Unnave"	Chinni Charan	Harish Raghavendra	4:05
3.	"Mudde Pettu"	Chinni Charan	Harish Raghavendra, Saindhavi	3:59
4.	"Yedho Undile (not featured in the film)"	Vishwa	Vishwa, Suchitra	4:14
5.	"Neekai Nenu"	Chandu Madhu	Hariharan, Reeta	4:29
6.	"Dhada Puttistha"	Chinni Charan	Shankar Mahadevan	5:11
Total length:				26:30
