= Guri (1986 film) =

- Directed by: P. Vasu
- Written by: P. Vasu
- Produced by: Parvathamma Rajkumar
- Starring: Rajkumar; Archana; Mukhyamantri Chandru
- Cinematography: V. K. Kannan
- Edited by: P. Bhakthavathsalam
- Music by: Rajan–Nagendra
- Production company: Poornima Enterprises
- Release date: 29 September 1986
- Country: India
- Language: Kannada

Guri is a 1986 Indian Kannada-language action film directed by P. Vasu and produced by Parvathamma Rajkumar under Poornima Enterprises. The film stars Dr. Rajkumar, Archana, Mukhyamantri Chandru and Jai Jagadish, while Pandari Bai makes a cameo appearance. The music was composed by Rajan–Nagendra, while cinematography and editing were handled by V. K. Kannan and P. Bhakthavathsalam. P. Vasu remade the film in Tamil in 1991 as Adhikari, thus making it the last film of Dr. Rajkumar which was remade in other language.

== Plot ==
Kaliprasad, a newly appointed customs officer, lives a happy life with his father and younger sister. Rudrayya, a crime boss, becomes irritated by Kaliprasad's efforts to disrupt his illegal business and invites him to work for him. However, Kaliprasad refuses and insults Rudrayya. Enraged, Rudrayya falsely implicates Kaliprasad in a smuggling case and has him imprisoned.

Following Kaliprasad's imprisonment, his sister commits suicide, and his father loses his mental stability. Devastated, Kaliprasad escapes from prison and plots his revenge against Rudrayya. He eventually succeeds in destroying Rudrayya and his criminal empire. However, during the final confrontation, Kaliprasad is shot by the police and succumbs to his injuries.

== Cast ==
- Dr. Rajkumar as Customs Officer Kaliprasad
- Archana as Shantadevi
- Jai Jagadish as Inspector Sadanand
- Mukhyamantri Chandru as Rudrayya
- Loknath as Inspector General of Police
- Thoogudeepa Srinivas as Vishwanath
- Tara as Gowri, Kaliprasad's sister
- Thimmayya
- Sadashiva Brahmavar as school master Shamanna, Kaliprasad's father
- Sathish as Kashinath
- Vishwanath
- Shani Mahadevappa as Virupaksha, Rudrayya's henchman
- Bhatti Mahadevappa
- Go Ra Bheema Rao
- Venkatappa
- Shobha
- Shyamala
- Shanthamma
- Swapna
- Mala
- Pinku
- Prathibha
- Honnavalli Krishna
- D. M. Kumar
- Ashwath Narayan
- Kunigal Ramanath
- Jr. Narasimharaju
- M. S. Karanth
- Pandari Bai (cameo appearance) as Doctor

== Soundtrack ==
The songs by the Rajan–Nagendra duo were instant hits and well received.

No.	Song title	Singer(s)	Lyrics
1	"Thangaliyante Baalali Bande"	Dr. Rajkumar, Rathnamala Prakash	Chi. Udayashankar
2	"Allah Allah"	Dr. Rajkumar	Chi. Udayashankar
3	"Vasantha Kaala Bandaga"	Dr. Rajkumar	Chi. Udayashankar
4	"Kallina Veeneya"	Dr. Rajkumar	Chi. Udayashankar
5	"Vasantha Kaala Bandaga" (bit)	Dr. Rajkumar	Chi. Udayashankar
