= Kadhal Kisu Kisu =

- Title card
- Directed by: P. Vasu
- Written by: P. Vasu
- Produced by: M. Kesavan
- Starring: Bala; Charmy Kaur
- Cinematography: M. Kesavan
- Edited by: K. R. Selvaraj
- Music by: Vidyasagar
- Production company: Super Star Art Movies
- Release date: 18 July 2003
- Running time: 143 minutes
- Country: India
- Language: Tamil

Kadhal Kisu Kisu (transl. Rumours about love) is a 2003 Indian Tamil-language romantic action comedy film written and directed by P. Vasu. The film stars Bala and Charmy Kaur, while Manivannan, Kalabhavan Mani and Vivek play supporting roles. The film produced by Kesavan, had music scored by Vidyasagar. The film was released on 18 July 2003 to below average collections.

== Plot ==
Sriram is the only son of his parents. The family is settled in Malaysia and Sriram studies in a college. Indu is the daughter of a rich businessman Karunakaran and she is Sriram's classmate. Karunakaran is short tempered and never trusts his own daughter. He always fears that Indu would fall in love with someone which makes him very strict with her always.

One day, Indu's classmates plan to throw a surprise birthday party to her. But Karunakaran arrives during the time of the party which shocks Indu. One of her classmate foulplays by sending her a gift in the name of Sriram, which is seen by Karunakaran. Now Karunakaran suspects that Indu is in love with Sriram, but Indu denies that, which Karunakaran does not believe. Karunakaran plans to get Indu married to a rich guy. But Indu gets to know that the groom is a murderer and shows no interest in the wedding proposal which further angers Karunakaran.

A few other incidents happen by coincidence which makes Karunakaran believe that Indu and Sriram are in love. Karunakaran threatens Sriram's father asking him to control his son. When Sriram's father enquires about this, Sriram promises that he does not love anyone and he would marry only the girl selected by his parents. But Karunakaran's doubts still persist and he beats Sriram's father's shop one day. Sriram's father gets frightened and requests Sriram to leave the town for a few days so that Karunakaran does not harm Sriram.

Sriram agrees and decides to move to a nearby town. To his surprise, Indu also boards the same bus in which Sriram is travelling. Indu has decided to run away from her home as she could not bear her father's torture. Now Karunakaran again misunderstands that Sriram and Indu have eloped together and chases them.

Sriram and Indu get down from the bus to safeguard their lives and run towards to a forest. They stay for a few days in the forest as they didn't know the way to get out from there. Finally, Sriram and Indu manage to return. In the meantime, Karunakaran has lodged a complaint that Indu was kidnapped by Sriram. The couple reaches the court and reveals that no one was kidnapped and they also make it clear that they are not in love and all the happenings are mere coincidence.

Finally, Karunakaran realises his mistake and understands the Sriram's good intention of only marrying a girl selected by his parents and also feels bad about his rude behaviour towards his daughter. He also expresses interest to get Indu married to Sriram as he will not be able to find a better match than him. The film ends with both Indu and Sriram getting united.

== Cast ==
- Bala as Sriram
- Charmy Kaur as Indhu
- Manivannan as Sriram's father
- Kalabhavan Mani as Karunakaran
- Vivek as Thamizhselvan
- Meera Krishnan as Sriram's mother
- Mayilsamy as Mayilsamy
- P. Vasu as Inspector Vasu Devan
- Pondy Ravi

== Soundtrack ==
Soundtrack was composed by Vidyasagar.

Song	Singers	Lyrics
"Aalum Velum"	Tippu, Udit Narayan	Na. Muthukumar
"Adadaa"	Manikka Vinayagam, Karthik	Na. Muthukumar
"Chinna Chinnathai"	S. P. Balasubrahmanyam, Mano, Jayashri	P. Vijay
"Kabadi Kabadi"	Karthik, Tippu, Ganga, Pop Shalini, Febi Mani	P. Vijay
"Kadhal Arimugama"	Vijay Prakash, Sujatha	Kabilan
"Kadhal Kisu Kisu"	Tippu, Premji Amaren	Kamakodiyan

== Reception ==
Malathi Rangarajan of The Hindu gave the film a below-average review, noting "it is not that the director does not have a message for the viewer. He does, but the faulty approach to the theme takes the film far away from the mark." Malini Mannath of Chennai Online wrote, "The knot had the potential, but with the director depending on a whole series of co-incidences to carry forward his story, there's not much surprise or exciting viewing for the audience". Sify called it "another heartless love story which is far from entertaining. And post interval the film is slow and has a predictable climax".
