= Homeschooling and alternative education in India =

The legality of homeschooling in India and a plethora of alternative education schools spread over different states has been debated by educators, lawmakers, and parents since the passing of the Right of Children to Free and Compulsory Education Act (RTE) which makes formal education a fundamental right of every child between the ages of 6 and 14 and specifies minimum norms for schools. While the legality of homeschooling still remains a grey area, there have been petitions by parents and alternate schools in the past for granting relief. As per the Universal Declaration of Human Rights to which India is a signatory, quote: "Parents have a prior right to choose the kind of education that shall be given to their children."

== History of alternative schooling in India ==
In India, from the early 20th century, certain educational theorists have discussed and implemented radically different forms of education. Rabindranath Tagore's Visva-Bharati University, Sri Aurobindo's Sri Aurobindo International Center of Education and Mahatma Gandhi's ideal of "basic education" are prime examples.

In recent years, many new alternative schools have cropped up.

== Methodology of homeschooling in India ==
Homeschoolers in India use a wide variety of methods and materials, at par with international norms, and often customized to fit individual learning styles. Though there is no actual data available, the most prevalent methods in India are Montessori method, Unschooling, Radical Unschooling, Waldorf education and traditional School-at-home. Some of these approaches like Montessori and Waldorf are also available in school settings. Many homeschoolers follow formal education methods at home through CBSE, NIOS (formerly NOS) and IGCSE. Of these, IGCSE and NIOS are especially suited for homeschoolers. As the popularity of homeschooling increases, there are many online homeschooling providers entering the market, Notably 21K School the oldest being Wolsey Hall, Oxford which was established in 1894

To help students from Class 5 to Class 12 to benefit from homeschooling, the Maharashtra government on January 10, 2019, launched ‘Open SSC board’. Education Minister Vinod Tawde said in a Tweet that the Maharashtra Rajya Mukta Vidyalay Mandal is a platform for athletes, artists, disabled people, seniors and anyone who wishes to continue their academic journey while pursuing others interests and obligations surpassing all hurdles.

== Support groups ==
There are many Internet-based support groups for Alternative schoolers or Homeschoolers in India, with most participants based in major urban Indian cities. However, there is a considerable presence of homeschoolers in small towns who either independently educate their children or who are associated with alternative schools.

Some prominent Internet resources include

- Alternative Education India,
- Pune Homeschoolers
- Swashikshan – Indian Association of Homeschoolers
- Cascade Family Learning Society – A Society for Home Schooled Children in Chennai, India
- Montessori Worldwide School
- Homeschooling by Handholding
- Playgic childhood freedom advicacy

In addition, there are conferences, social meetups, apprenticeships and several other organized group activities that allow for knowledge-sharing on a regular basis.

== Media reports about homeschooling ==
In recent years, quite a few homeschooled children in India have made a splash by being accepted into top higher education institutions such as the IIT and MIT. A number of them also choose to be integrated into mainstream education at some point. Some prominent homeschoolers include education entrepreneur, Satya Narayanan R., founder of the "Career Launcher" entrance coaching platform. Some estimates say as many as 15,000 Indian families have decided to keep their children from going to school, choosing instead to develop individual caliber holistically within the community machinery, specially as safety has become a prime concern for parents nowadays.
