= Shakthi Vasudevan =

Indian actor

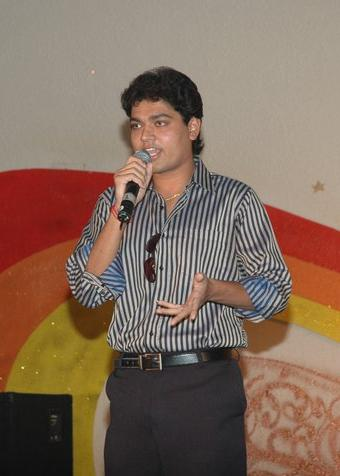
- Born: Prashanth Vasudevan; 23 February 1983 (age 43); Chennai, Tamil Nadu, India
- Other name: Trigger Shakthi
- Years active: 1990–1994; 2007-present
- Spouse: Smrithi (m. 2011)
- Children: 1
- Father: P. Vasu

Shakthi Vasudevan (born as Prashanth Vasudevan) is an Indian actor who predominantly works in Tamil cinema. The son of director P. Vasu, Shakthi began his career as a child artist in his father's films before his first lead role in Thottal Poo Malarum (2007). He has since enjoyed limited success as an actor, notably appearing in Ninaithale Inikkum (2009) and his father's Kannada film, Shivalinga (2016).

== Career ==
Shakthi first featured as a child artist in his father P. Vasu's films, portraying small roles in films including Nadigan (1990), Chinna Thambi (1991) and Senthamizh Paattu (1992). In 2007, he returned in the lead role in his father's Thottal Poo Malarum (2007); however, the film fared averagely at the box-office. In regard to his performance, Sify.com stated "the only silver lining is Sakthi who makes a decent debut" and that "he is good looking and does his role with a certain amount of confidence". His following films, the romantic comedy Mahesh Saranya Matrum Palar (2008) and the college drama Ninaithale Inikkum (2009) garnered good reviews, with the latter also performing well at the box office. For the former film, a critic from Rediff.com wrote Shakthi "looks shell-shocked a couple of times but mostly manages to deliver a creditable performance."

Despite initial high-profile media coverage of his films, Shakthi's subsequent films were predominantly failures. His next venture, Aattanayagann garnered negative reviews and performed poorly, though Behindwoods.com noted "Sakthi emerges largely unscathed" and that "he does have the flair of an entertainer and the director’s efforts to show him as a well-rounded actor are evident". Following a couple of guest appearance in films, his next release, the romantic drama Etho Seithai Ennai (2012), was a critical and commercial failure. Likewise, films including Chella's Neruppukozhi, Vanjikottai Valiban co-starring Roma and Kalla Sirippazhaga co-starring Meghana Raj, were cancelled after finishing parts of the shoot. In 2013, Shakthi made a public statement stating that he had appeared in several films out of sympathy for the film makers and would focus on better scripts. He subsequently began work on a bilingual thriller film titled Padam Pesum in Tamil and Ala Ila Ela in Telugu by director Raghava, where he was cast opposite Poorna and Nisha Kothari, but the Tamil version of the film also was shelved midway through production before being revived in 2024. The Telugu version had a delayed release in 2023.

Following a four years hiatus, he returned with the new screen name of Sakthivel Vasu in the police thriller Tharkappu (2016). Portraying a cop who is under fire for human rights violations, a critic from The Times of India wrote Shakthi "does his best" but the "monologuing becomes hilarious after a point". The film had a low profile release and received generally unfavourable reviews. He was then cast by his father again in the Kannada horror comedy, Shivalinga (2016), in the role of a Muslim butcher whose spirit haunts a house. The film was profitable venture, winning good reviews while a critic from the Bangalore Mirror added Shakthi "does make a mark". He was subsequently selected to reprise the role in the Tamil remake of the same name, where critics praised his performance stating he "has given a commendable performance in the film and turns emotional in the pre-climax sequence" and that "he has done full justice to it". However his next film, the crime thriller 7 Naatkal (2017), again garnered mixed reviews and fared poorly at the box office.

In 2017, Shakthi took part in the first season of the Tamil reality television show, Bigg Boss hosted by Kamal Haasan in Star Vijay. During his stay in the house, he was widely criticised for making sexist remarks and for his harsh, inhumane treatment of actress Oviya. Post her departure, Oviya later called on audiences to forgive Shakthi for his behaviour. During his time on the show, he attracted attention for his regular usage of the word "trigger", with audiences and social media users dubbing him as "Trigger Shakthi" as a result.

== Personal life ==
Shakthi was born to film director P. Vasu and Shanthi. He has a sister, Abhirami. His paternal grandfather Peethambaram was a popular make-up artist for M. G. Ramachandran. Further family members, Shakthi's cousin Gautham and uncle Vimalkumar made their debut as director and writer with the film 7 Naatkal (2017).

Shakthi got engaged to Smrithi, a B.Com graduate from Stella Maris College, Chennai. The engagement ceremony was held at a hotel in Chennai on 5 June 2011 and the wedding took place on 31 October 2011, in Mayor Ramanathan Hall in Chennai. The pair has one son, Harshath.

== Filmography ==
=== Films ===
- All films are in Tamil, unless otherwise noted.

Year	Film	Role	Notes
1990	Nadigan	Prashanth	Child artist
1991	Chinna Thambi	Young Chinna Thambi	Child artist
1992	Rickshaw Mama		Child artist
1992	Senthamizh Paattu	Young Bala	Child artist
1992	Idhu Namma Bhoomi	Rathnavel's son	Child artist
2007	Thottal Poo Malarum	Ravi Thyagarajan	
2008	Mahesh, Saranya Matrum Palar	Mahesh	
2009	Ninaithale Inikkum	Shakthi	
2010	Aattanayagann	Lingam	
2011	Ko	Himself	Special appearance
2011	Yuvan Yuvathi	Saravanan	Guest appearance
2012	Etho Seithai Ennai	Arjun	
2016	Tharkappu	Inspector Shakthivel	
2016	Shivalinga	Raheem	Kannada film
2017	Shivalinga	Raheem	
2017	7 Naatkal	Gautham Krishna	
2023	Ala Ila Ela	R. Suryaprakash (Mithra)	Telugu film
2024	Oru Thee	R. Suryaprakash (Mithra)	Direct release on Thanthi One
2026	Anali	Lal Chetta	
TBA	Karathey Babu	Boxer Selvaraj	Post-production

=== Television ===
- All television are in Tamil, unless otherwise noted.

Year	Title	Role	Platform
2017	Bigg Boss	Contestant	Star Vijay
2017	Mrs. Chinnathirai	Judge	Star Vijay
