= P. Vasu =

Indian film director, writer, and actor

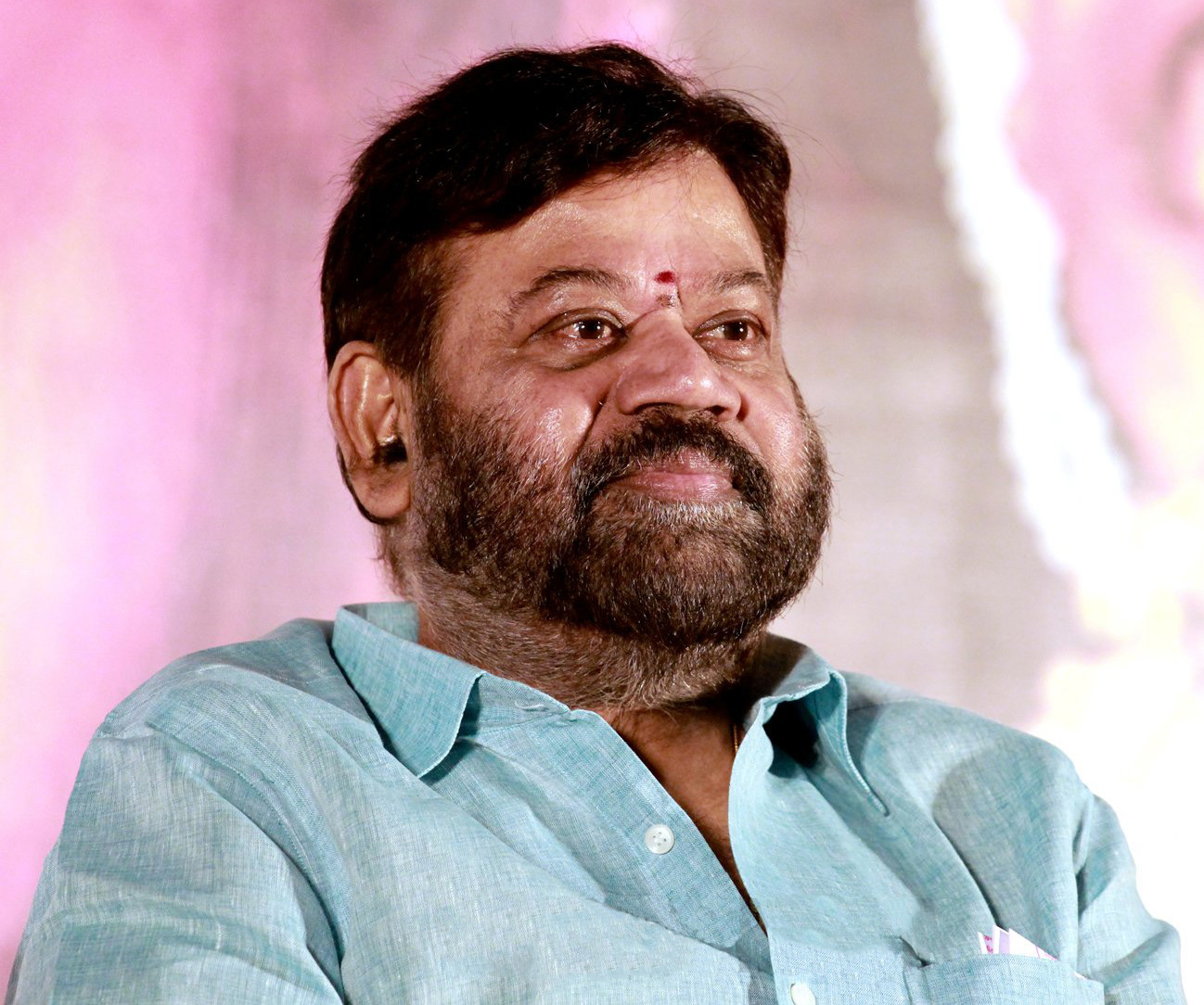
- Vasu in 2014
- Born: Vasudevan Peethambaram; 15 September 1954 (age 72); Thrissur, Kerala, India
- Occupations: Film director; screenwriter; film producer; actor
- Years active: 1981–2023
- Spouse: Shanthi Vasudevan
- Children: Shakthi Vasudevan; Abirami Vasudevan

Vasudevan Peethambaram (born 15 September 1954), known professionally as P. Vasu, is an Indian film director, screenwriter and actor who works predominantly in Tamil and Kannada films, apart from a few Telugu, Hindi, and Malayalam language films. In a career spanning three decades, Vasu has directed over 65 films to his credit.

== Early life and education ==
P. Vasu's father, Nedumbaal Moothedathu Peethambaram, a Malayali from Irinjalakuda Thrissur, worked as a make-up man for M. G. Ramachandran and N. T. Rama Rao in their films during his time. He was one of the leading make-up artists during his period and was elected as the president of the make-up union Tamil Nadu for 30 years. He later went on to become a producer.

He produced about 25 films in Tamil and Telugu and became one of the leading producers in the south. He produced with his brother M. C. Sekhar, who was a cinematographer. M. C. Sekhar had worked as a cinematographer for more than 150 films. Peethambharan died on 21 February 2011 at the age of 89.

Vasu is an alumnus of Wesley High School, Chennai. Vasu is married to his Uncle's (His uncle Raman who was makeup man for Prem Nazir and M. N. Nambiar) daughter Shanthi and has a son, Sakthi Vasu, who is a former film actor and a daughter, Abhirami Vasudevan. His mother is Kamala. Vasu's brothers are Vidyasagar and Vimal, and his sisters are Vijaylakshmi, Vasantha and Vanaja. He is a Malayali from Nedumbal, a village in Thrissur district, Kerala, but settled in Tamil Nadu.

== Career ==
Vasu joined director C. V. Sridhar as an assistant. Vasu started his career with Santhana Bharathi as a co-director and made films such as Panneer Pushpangal (1981), Madhu Malar (1981), Mella Pesungal (1983), Sahasame Jeevitham (1984) and Needhiyin Nizhal (1985). "We compromised on certain things as we had different approaches to the subject. That's the reason why some of our other movies failed to make a big impression in the box office, prompting us to take our own paths," said Vasu and moreover Vasu was more interested in making commercial films while Bharathi wants to make different kind of films.

During his career, films like Panakkaran (1990), Nadigan (1990), Chinna Thambi (1991), Mannan (1992), Walter Vetrivel (1993) and Sethupathi IPS (1994) have become blockbusters.

The director went through a career slump in the mid-1990s after a series of failures, through his high budget romantic musical Love Birds (1996). He has made films in all the four South Indian languages and he has worked with almost all top stars.

From the 2000s, Vasu also began as an actor. He usually portrays a supporting role or an antagonistic role. His directed films Apthamithra (2004) went on to cross the one-year mark, while legendary Chandramukhi (2005) has had a record run of 800 days and more. Elated with the grand success of his Kannada film Aptharakshaka (2010), which happens the last project of Vishnuvardhan. He completed remaking the film in Telugu titled Nagavalli (2010), features Venkatesh in the lead role. Earlier P. Vasu had plans about remaking the film in Tamil with Superstar Rajinikanth titled Chandramukhi 2. However, the project didn't happen as the actor got busy with Shankar’s Enthiran (2010).

Soon after the grand success of Chandramukhi, P Vasu was initially supposed to sign Kamal Haasan for a film featuring him in triple action roles. However, Kamal Haasan couldn't take up the project as he already got committed to Dasavathaaram (2008), where he had to play 10 roles.

Vasu made a film called Thottal Poo Malarum (2007), with his son Shakthi. The young actor is not new to acting; he has acted as a child in his father's films.

In June 2013, P. Vasu revealed that he was set to direct an English film titled Curry in Love, with an apparent star cast of Sonam Kapoor, Anil Kapoor, Vijay, Eddie Murphy and Jon Voight. However, the supposed cast denied the reports as baseless and P. Vasu postponed the film, citing a delay in production. Later in April 2017, Vasu revealed that he still had intentions of making the film if he found a producer to help finance the project. Similarly in early 2014, P. Vasu released an official statement claiming that his next film would be an animatronics venture titled Aishwaryavum Aayiram Kaakkavum and that Aishwarya Rai would feature in the leading role. Aishwarya Rai's team later denied claims citing that such allegations of an agreement were premature.

Actor Raghava Lawrence have teamed up for the first time with the director in Shivalinga (2017) that too for the remake of Vasu's Kannada blockbuster Shivalinga (2016) as horror-comedy genre. Shivalinga is saved by its packaging as a commercial family entertainer and Vadivelu's comedy. Vasu is also his outing with Shiva Rajkumar in Ayushman Bhava (2019). His final film Chandramukhi 2 (2023) was released to negative reviews.

== Style of working ==
Vasu's films are usually in the masala genre, with melodrama as a key theme. He learnt the finer nuances of direction from Sridhar, under whom he started off as an assistant director, but added that he never followed Sridhar's style of filmmaking and has always tried to be original. Vasu said that during childhood, "I found myself watching films and narrating the stories to my friends in school. If the school would begin at nine I would reach there by eight and narrate the story for an hour".

== Accolades ==
Vasu has won recognition for his work from the film fraternity and the state government. He won state awards for three years in a row from 1990, for Best Screenplay and Dialogues in Nadigan, in 1991 as Best Director in Chinna Thambi. He was awarded the Filmfare award for Best Direction for the 2004, Kannada movie Apthamitra. He also won the Tamil Nadu State Film Honorary Award – J. Jayalalithaa Award in 2002. He was awarded the Kalaimaamani Award in 2004, reminiscent of his father Shri M. Peethambaram who was an awardee for Best make-up.

Vasu is a member of the state award selection committee and jury member of the committee for tax-free movies.

== Filmography ==
=== As director ===
Year	Film	Language	Note
1981	Panneer Pushpangal	Tamil	Co-directed with Santhana Bharathi
1981	Madhu Malar	Tamil	Co-directed with Santhana Bharathi
1983	Mella Pesungal	Tamil	Co-directed with Santhana Bharathi
1984	Sahasame Jeevitham	Telugu	Co-directed with Santhana Bharathi
1985	Needhiyin Nizhal	Tamil	Co-directed with Santhana Bharathi
1986	Kathanayaka	Kannada	
1986	Guri	Kannada	
1987	Jayasimha	Kannada	
1987	Jeevana Jyothi	Kannada	
1988	Daada	Kannada	
1988	En Thangachi Padichava	Tamil	
1989	Pillaikkaga	Tamil	
1989	Ponmana Selvan	Tamil	
1989	Vaathiyaar Veettu Pillai	Tamil	
1990	Panakkaran	Tamil	
1990	Velai Kidaichuduchu	Tamil	
1990	Nadigan	Tamil	Tamil Nadu State Film Award for Best Dialogue Writer
1991	Chinna Thambi	Tamil	Cinema Express Award for Best Director; Tamil Nadu State Film Award for Best Film; Tamil Nadu State Film Award for Best Director
1991	Adhikari	Tamil	Remake of Guri
1991	Kizhakku Karai	Tamil	
1992	Mannan	Tamil	
1992	Rickshaw Mama	Tamil	
1992	Idhu Namma Bhoomi	Tamil	
1992	Amma Vanthachu	Tamil	
1992	Senthamizh Paattu	Tamil	25th Film
1993	Walter Vetrivel	Tamil	
1993	Uzhaippali	Tamil	
1993	Udan Pirappu	Tamil	
1994	Sethupathi IPS	Tamil	
1994	Sadhu	Tamil	
1995	Kattumarakaran	Tamil	
1995	Coolie	Tamil	
1995	Mr. Madras	Tamil	
1996	Love Birds	Tamil	
1997	Vaimaye Vellum	Tamil	
1997	Paththini	Tamil	
1999	Ponnu Veetukaaran	Tamil	
1999	Hogi Pyaar Ki Jeet	Hindi	
1999	Suyamvaram	Tamil	
1999	Malabar Police	Tamil	
2000	Seenu	Tamil	
2000	Vanna Thamizh Pattu	Tamil	
2000	Kakkai Siraginilae	Tamil	
2001	Asathal	Tamil	
2002	Prudhvi Narayana	Telugu	
2003	Hrudayavantha	Kannada	
2003	Kadhal Kisu Kisu	Tamil	
2004	Apthamitra	Kannada	Filmfare Award for Best Film – Kannada; Filmfare Award for Best Director – Kannada
2005	Chandramukhi	Tamil	Remake of Apthamitra; Tamil Nadu State Film Award for Best Film
2006	Paramasivan	Tamil	50th Film
2007	Maharadhi	Telugu	
2007	Thottal Poo Malarum	Tamil	
2008	Krishnarjuna	Telugu	
2008	Kuselan	Tamil	
2008	Kathanayakudu	Telugu	
2010	Aptharakshaka	Kannada	
2010	Nagavalli	Telugu	Remake of Aptharakshaka
2011	Puli Vesham	Tamil	
2012	Arakshaka	Kannada	
2014	Drishya	Kannada	
2016	Shivalinga	Kannada	
2017	Shivalinga	Tamil	Remake of Shivalinga
2019	Ayushman Bhava	Kannada	
2021	Drishya 2	Kannada	
2023	Chandramukhi 2	Tamil	Sequel to Chandramukhi

=== As actor ===
Year	Film	Role	Language	Notes
1996	Love Birds	Guy who throws coin for Vadivelu	Tamil	
2000	Vallarasu	Kandhasamy	Tamil	
2000	Seenu	Kesavan	Tamil	
2001	Ee Parakkum Thalika	R. K. Santhanam	Malayalam	
2001	Thenkasi Pattanam	Devaraj	Tamil	
2002	Seema Simham	MP Kaaleswara Rao	Telugu	
2002	Sundara Travels	Gayathri's father	Tamil	
2002	Kadhal Virus	Himself	Tamil	Special appearance
2003	Banda Paramasivam	Chidambara Udayar	Tamil	
2003	Kadhal Kisu Kisu	Inspector Vasu Devan	Tamil	
2003	Anjaneya	DGP	Tamil	
2004	Arasatchi	Saravanaperumal	Tamil	
2004	Maha Nadigan	Arivanandan	Tamil	
2005	Chandramukhi	Himself	Tamil	Special appearance in song "Devuda Devuda"
2007	Manikanda	Mahalakshmi's grandfather	Tamil	
2008	Dasavathaaram	J. Ragavendra (Jaa Raa)	Tamil	
2008	Kuselan	Himself	Tamil	Special appearance
2008	Kathanayakudu	Himself	Telugu	Special appearance
2008	Nenu Meeku Telusa?	Aditya's Father	Telugu	Special appearance
2010	Naane Ennul Illai	Himself	Tamil	
2010	Aptharakshaka	Himself	Kannada	Special appearance in the song "Chamundi Thaayiyaane"
2010	Thanthonni	Adv. Anand Sharma	Malayalam	
2016	Shivalinga	Himself	Kannada	Special appearance in the song "Yethara Yethara"
2017	Sivalinga	Himself	Tamil	Special appearance in song "Saarah Saarah"
2026	Chennai Love Story	Himself	Telugu	

=== As writer ===
Year	Film	Credited as		Language	Notes
Year	Film	Story	Screenplay	Language	Notes
1986	Ee Jeeva Ninagagi	Yes	Yes	Kannada	Remade in Tamil as Amma Vandhachu
1986	Ratha Sapthami		Yes	Kannada	
1987	Karunamayi		Yes	Kannada	Remade in Tamil as Ponmana Selvan
1988	Nammoora Raja	Yes		Kannada	Remade in Tamil as Vaathiyar Veettu Pillau
1993	Purusha Lakshanam	Yes		Tamil	
1998	Ayushman Bhava	Yes		Malayalam	

=== As producer ===
Year	Film	Language	Notes
1993	Walter Vetrivel	Tamil	Produced by his wife Shanthi
1994	Saadhu	Tamil	
1999	Malabar Police	Tamil	Produced by his wife Shanthi
2007	Thottal Poo Malarum	Tamil	

=== As singer ===
Year	Film	Song	Composer	Notes
1989	Pillaikkaga	"Un Annai Naan"	Gangai Amaran	
