= Nunnunarvu =

2016 film by Mathivanan Sakthivel

- Official poster
- Directed by: Mathivanan Sakthivel
- Written by: Mathivanan Sakthivel
- Starring: Mathivanan Sakthivel; Indira
- Cinematography: Dinesh; Prasath
- Edited by: Suresh Urs
- Music by: Mayu Ganeshan (songs); Raj (score)
- Production company: Sakthi Screens
- Release date: 30 September 2016
- Country: India
- Language: Tamil

Nunnunarvu (transl. Telepathy) is a 2016 Indian Tamil-language romantic thriller film written and directed by Mathivanan Sakthivel, who previously directed and starred in Maha Maha. The film features him and Indira in the lead roles. The music for the songs in the film is composed by Mayu Ganeshan with background score done by Raj and editing by Suresh Urs. The film released on 30 September 2016.

The film, predominantly shot in Australia, tells about a dentist trainee going there for his exam and experiencing unexplained feelings. The story centers around the consequences leading as a result of those feelings.

== Plot ==
Chandru (Mathivanan Sakthivel) visits Sydney for his dental course exam. Charu (Indira), who is a psychology student, does research on telepathy. She learns the techniques to connect through telepathy. As a part of the technique, she tries to connect with Chandru, who fits with the character profile of a person that she wants to fall in love. During the process of connection through telepathy, both Chandru and Charu feels each other's feelings. Charu feels a hit that Chandru experiences during a robbery incident. Chandru feels a cut to his finger when Charu cuts her finger. They see each other's visions and hear each other's hearings. Eventually, they are able to see each other through a mirror. Their relationship starts as a friendship and then love.

Meanwhile, Chandru's friend Vinesh (R. Dinesh), murders a girl which is known only to Chandru. Vinesh now wants to kill Chandru. Charu's family friend Prasanth (Thiriloschenen Thiagarajah) abducts Charu out of lust. The climax is about how Chandru and Charu overcome their problems with Vinesh and Prasanth through telepathy.

== Cast ==
Most of the cast in the movie is newcomers, and they make their debuts in this film.

- Mathivanan Sakthivel as Chandru
- Indira as Charu
- R. Dinesh as Vinesh
- Thiriloschenen Thiagarajah as Prasanth
- Mandas Ramesh Jesudas as Charu's father
- Sefath as Paarvi
- Githa Vanan as Anitha
- Uma as Dentist
- Sujan Selven as Vinesh's friend
- Jay Kallaway as Ian Shorten
- Emma Monk as Jenny
- Bianca Moon as Camp Girl
- Shaun Anthony Robinson as Thief

== Production ==
The film is produced by Sakthi Screens, written and directed by Mathivanan Sakthivel.

The film's title, Nunnunarvu, is unusual and not commonly used in Tamil.

== Music ==
The film has five song tracks composed by Mayu Ganeshan. and lyrics by Mathivanan Sakthivel. Background score is done by Raj.

Track list
No.	Title	Singer(s)	Length
1.	"Pesikava"	Sathyan Sivanathan, Aiswarya Arvind	5:08
2.	"Manjal Malai"	Sathyan Sivanathan, Shalini Harikes	3:56
3.	"Engrinitho Isai"	Gireshanth Ganesharaja, Nivethitha Roshananth	2:51
4.	"Weekendla"	Gopi Iyer, Rush	4:00
5.	"Background score theme"	Raj	4:33
Total length:			20:29

== Release ==
The film was released on 30 September 2016 in India. In Australia, the film was released on 1 October 2016 and 2 October 2016 in the United Kingdom.

== Critical reception ==
Professional ratings
Review scores
Source	Rating
Times of India Samayam	3.5/5 stars

Dinamalar review quoted that the concept of telepathy in "Nunnunarvu" movie is new to Tamil cinema and that the movie is different and fast-paced. Mathivanan Sakthivel has perfectly fit the character of Chandru in the film. The scenes where the Chandru and Charu characters connect for the first time through telepathy and scenes where both feel the feelings of each other are interesting scenes in the film. The editing by Suresh Urs is fault less and the cinematography is good. The villain characters played by Dinesh and Thiri and the character Anitha are good. The melody songs composed by Mayu Ganehsan are pleasing. The scenes where the Charu character is abducted doesn't look new and these types of scenes are common in Tamil cinema. In summary the film "Nunnunarvu"is new concept to Tamil cinema.

Maalai Malar quoted that Nunnuarvu's concept of telepathy is excellent. While the director has chosen a story that is suitable for many artists, more attention could have been given to the casting for this film. Mathivanan Sakthivel has improved his acting from his first film Maha Maha. While artists doesn't look like professional actors, they have done a good job. Mayu Ganeshan's songs are ok to hear and background score needs improving.

== Awards ==
Nunnunarvu won the "Award of Recognition" from "The IndieFEST Film Awards" in May 2019.

In 2020, Mathivanan Sakthivel received the Best Writer award at the Indo-Global International Film Festival and Nunnunarvu also received the Special Jury Award at this Festival.

In 2021, Nunnunarvu was officially selected for the Mumbai International Film Awards and Mathivanan Sakthivel won Best Screenplay Award for Nunnunarvu.

== Other-language version ==
Nunnunarvu was dubbed as Panchathantralu in Telugu. The Telugu version of the movie was released in December 2018.
