= Peth =

Peth may refer to:

- Peths in Pune, places (peths) in Pune, India
  - Kasba Peth
  - Budhwar Peth
- Peth Islampur, a village in Sangli district, Maharashtra, India
- Peth taluka, a taluka in Nashik district, Maharashtra State, India
- Peth, Dahanu, a village in Maharashtra, India
- Astrid Peth, a character played by Kylie Minogue on Dr. Who
- Peristimulus time histogram, sometimes called pre-event time histogram or PETH
- The Peth, a band formed in 2008 by drummer Dafydd Ieuan
- PEth, short for phosphatidylethanol, a biomarker for alcohol consumption
