= Naan Avanillai =

Naan Avanillai (transl. I am not him) may refer to the following Indian Tamil language films:

- Naan Avanillai (1974 film), directed by K. Balachander
- Naan Avan Illai (2007 film), a remake of the 1974 film directed by Selva
- Naan Avan Illai 2, a sequel to Naan Avanillai (2007) directed by Selva
