= Sa Re Ga Ma Pa Challenge Tamil 2009 =

- Directed by: Andrew Jones
- Presented by: Bhavna Balakrishnan
- Judges: M. S. Viswanathan; Nithyasree Mahadevan; Vani Jairam; Sharreth
- Country of origin: India
- No. of seasons: 1

Production
- Executive producer: Sudarshan
- Running time: 60 minutes

Original release
- Network: Zee Tamil
- Release: 22 June 2009

Zee Tamil's Sa Re Ga Ma Pa 2009 Challenge was a reality-based Indian singing competition that aired on Tamil language TV channel Zee Tamil. It was designed to be a talent hunt in Tamil Nadu. The top 15 contestants would have an opportunity to perform with celebrity singers during the main stage of the competition. The show was sponsored by Clinic Plus.

Prem Menon, Zee Tamil TV's business head, confirmed that more than 10,000 aspirants auditioned for the competition throughout Tamil Nadu from which 15 contestants were selected for the competition, before the competition was filtered down to 4 finalists. Top 15 contestant performances and the finals were judged by music director M. S. Viswanathan, veteran playback singers Vani Jairam and Nithyasree Mahadevan, and composer Sharreth. The four finalists of the competition were Anand, Bhargavi, Deepak, and Gopalakrishnan. Contestant Anand was crowned the winner of the competition, with contestant Gopalakrishnan being crowned runner-up and contestant Bhargavi being third-placed in the competition.

The show premiered on 22 June 2009, and episodes were telecast between Mondays and Tuesdays each week at 9:00 pm. Encore telecasts were aired on Wednesdays and Thursdays at 5:00 pm, as well as Saturdays and Sundays each week at 8:00 pm..

== Debut episodes ==
No.	Title	Original release date
1	"Debut Episodes – part 1"	22 June 2009
Chief guests for the debut episode were music directors M. S. Viswanathan, Vijay Antony and Radhika. Singers were brought in a chariot from Vadapalani to the studio set.
2	"Debut Episodes – part 2"	23 June 2009
This episode introduced the celebrity singers with whom the final 15 contestants of the show would perform.

== Auditions ==
Open auditions were held across Tamil Nadu. Prem Menon, Zee Tamil TV's business head, confirmed that more than 10,000 aspirants auditioned for the competition throughout Tamil Nadu from which 15 contestants were selected for the competition.

No.	Title	Original release date
3	"Tamil Nadu Auditions – part 1"	29 June 2009
First round auditions held in Trichy, Madurai, Thirunelveli, and Coimbatore.
4	"Tamil Nadu Auditions – part 2"	30 June 2009
First round auditions held in Chennai, and second round auditions held in Trichy, Madurai, Thirunelveli, and Coimbatore. Judges during the second round auditions were celebrity singers Prasanna, Mathangi, Roshini, Mukesh, Srilkeha Parthasarthy, Sathyen, Jeye Dev, Vinaya, and Kalpana.
5	"Tamil Nadu Auditions – part 3"	6 July 2009
Second round auditions held in Chennai.
6	"Tamil Nadu Auditions – part 4"	7 July 2009
Behind-the-scenes footage from previous audition episodes.
7	"Final Auditions – part 1"	13 July 2009
Further auditions where contestants which were selected from the open auditions competed to be selected in the top 15.
8	"Final Auditions – part 2"	14 July 2009
Further auditions where contestants which were selected from the open auditions competed to be selected in the top 15.
9	"Final Auditions – part 3"	20 July 2009
Final auditions for contestant selection. The top spots were filled in batches of 6.
9	"Celebrity/Playback Singer & Contestant Pairings"	20 July 2009
The top 15 contestants were paired with celebrity/playback singers for the competition. The names of the celebrity singers were placed into two bowls. Male contestants picked out a female celebrity singer randomly from a bowl, while female contestants picked out a male celebrity singer from the other bowl.

== Competition Rounds ==
=== Top 15 contestants and celebrity singers ===
The top 15 contestants selected through the main audition rounds and their pairings with the celebrity singers are as follows:

Finalist	Gender	Celebrity Singer	Gender
Shiva Archana	Female	Mukesh	Male
Deepak	Male	Vinaya	Female
Anand	Male	Prashanthini	Female
Gopalakrishnan	Male	Vijayalakshmi	Female
Diwakaran	Male	Kalpana	Female
Shruti Vandana	Female	Jayadev	Male
Ramesh	Male	Roshini	Female
Kalaiwani	Female	~~Vijay Yesudas~~(opted out of the show before main competition round); Naveen Madhav (Raveendran's youngest son)	Male
Ashwath	Male	Mathangi	Female
Manasi	Female	Aslam	Male
Raghu	Male	Sangeetha	Female
Bhargavi	Female	Belly Raj	Male
Anush	Female	Srilekha Parthasarathy	Female
Aruna	Female	Sathyan	Male
Swathi	Female	VV Prasanna	Male

=== Performances ===
==== Introduction Round (27 July 2009 – 28 July 2009) ====
- Permanent Compere: Bhavna Balakrishnan
- Judges: M. S. Viswanathan (music director) & Noyal James (music coordinator of music director A. R. Rahman)
- Performances:

Air date	Contestant	Celebrity singer	Song	Original artist	Lyricist	Music composer/director	Source/Movie (year)
27 & 28 July 2009	Shiva Archana	Mukesh	"Where Is The Party"	Priyadarshini & Mukesh	Silambarasan Rajendar	Yuvan Shankar Raja	Silambattam (2008)
27 & 28 July 2009	Deepak	Vinaya	"Suppose Unnai Kaadhalichu"	Ranjith & Vinaya		Vijay Antony	Sukran (2005)
27 & 28 July 2009	Anand	Prashanthini	"Mundhinam Parthene"	Naresh Iyer & Prashanthini	Thamarai	Harris Jayaraj	Vaaranam Aayiram (2008)
27 & 28 July 2009	Gopalakrishnan	Vijayalakshmi	"Pallanadhu Pallanadhu"	Vidyasagar & S. Rajalakshmi	Yugabharathi	Vidyasagar	Kuruvi (2008)
27 & 28 July 2009	Diwakaran	Kalpana	"Madurai Jilla"	Karthik & Kalpana	Vairamuthu, Na. Muthukumar, Viveka, & Thiraivannan	D. Imman	Thiruvilaiyaadal Aarambam (2006)
27 & 28 July 2009	Shruti Vandana	Jayadev	"Ean Enakku Mayakkam"	Sangeetha & Jayadev	Pa. Vijay	Vijay Antony & D. Imman	Naan Avan Illai (2007)
27 & 28 July 2009	Ramesh	Roshini	"Pottu Thakku"	Silambarasan & Roshini		Srikanth Deva	Kuthu (2004)
27 & 28 July 2009	Kalaiwani	Navin Madhav	"Daddy Mummy Veetil Illai"	Mamta Mohandas & Naveen Madhav	Viveka	Devi Sri Prasad	Villu (2008)
27 & 28 July 2009	Ashwath	Mathangi	"X Machi"	Nakul & Mathangi	Vaali	Harris Jayaraj	Ghajini (2005)
27 & 28 July 2009	Manasi	Aslam	"Kodana Kodi"	Ranina Reddy, Suvi Suresh, & Rahul Nambiar	Gangai Amaran	Yuvan Shankar Raja	Saroja (2008)
27 & 28 July 2009	Raghu	Sangeetha	"Dialamo Dialamo"	Vijay Antony & Sangeetha	Vairamuthu, Vijay Antony, & Pugazhendhi	Vijay Antony	Dishyum (2006)
27 & 28 July 2009	Bhargavi	Belly Raj	"Kangal Irandal"	Deepa Miriam & Belly Raj		James Vasanthan	Subramaniapuram
27 & 28 July 2009	Anush	Srilekha Parthasarathy	"Kalyanamthan Kattikittu Odi Pokkalama"	KK, Yugendran, & Srilekha Parthasarathy	Snehan	Harris Jayaraj	Saamy (2003)
27 & 28 July 2009	Aruna	Sathyan	"Kanavile Kanavile"	Swetha Mohan & Sathyan		Srikanth Deva	Nepali (2008)
27 & 28 July 2009	Swathi	Prasanna	"Unnai Ninaithen"	Shreya Ghoshal & Prasanna		Vijay Antony	Mariyadhai (2009)

==== Round of 15 (4 August 2009 – 5 August 2009) ====
- Permanent Compere: Bhavna Balakrishnan
- Judges: M. S. Viswanathan (music director) & Nithyasree Mahadevan (Carnatic music exponent and veteran playback singer)
- Performances:

This week, 15 contestant-singer duos would each present a duet song in front of judges M.S. Viswanathan and Nityashree Mahadevan. Following the 15 performances which were described as "scintillating" by The Hindu, a contestant-singer duo was eliminated from the competition, leaving 14 playback singers and 14 contestants remaining in the competition.

Air date	Contestant	Celebrity singer	Song	Original artist	Lyricist	Music composer/director	Source/Movie (year)
4 & 5 August 2009	Ramesh	Roshini	"Aaiyaiyo en usurukkule"				
4 & 5 August 2009	Bhargavi	Belly Raj	"Pudhu Vellai Mazhai"				Roja
4 & 5 August 2009	Diwakaran	Kalpana	"Vaa Vaa Pakkam Vaa"				
4 & 5 August 2009	Shruti Vandana	Jaydev	"Sorgame Endralum"				
4 & 5 August 2009	Raghu	Sangeetha	"Idhazhil kathai yezhudum"				
4 & 5 August 2009	Shiva Archana	Mukesh	"Madurai Marikozhunthu"				
4 & 5 August 2009	Ashwath	Mathangi	"Andru Vandhadum Adhe Nilaa"				
4 & 5 August 2009	Deepak	Vinaya	"Sundhari Kannal Oru"				
4 & 5 August 2009	Anand	Prashanthini	"Malare Mounamaa"				
4 & 5 August 2009	Manasi	Aslam	"Rathiriyl Poothrikkum"				
4 & 5 August 2009	Anush	Srilekha Parthasarathy	"Oho Endhan Baby"				
4 & 5 August 2009	Aruna	Sathyan	"Urugude Marugude"				
4 & 5 August 2009	Swathi	Prasanna	"Oru Kaadhal Dhevadhai Vandhaal"				
4 & 5 August 2009	Kalaiwani	Naveen Madhav					

==== Round of 14 (10 August 2009 – 11 August 2009) ====
- Permanent Compere: Bhavna Balakrishnan
- Judges: M. S. Viswanathan (music director) & Nithyasree Mahadevan (Carnatic music exponent and veteran playback singer)
- Performances:

– Contestant is eliminated

Air date	Contestant	Celebrity singer	Song	Original artist	Lyricist	Music composer/director	Source/Movie (year)
10 & 11 August 2009							

==== Round of 13 (17 August 2009 – 18 August 2009) ====
- Permanent Compere: Bhavna Balakrishnan
- Judges: M. S. Viswanathan (music director)
- Performances:

– Contestant is eliminated

Air date	Contestant	Celebrity singer	Song	Original artist	Lyricist	Music composer/director	Source/Movie (year)
17 & 18 August 2009							

==== Round of 12 (24 August 2009 – 25 August 2009) ====
- Permanent Compere: Bhavna Balakrishnan
- Judges: Nithyasree Mahadevan (Carnatic music exponent & veteran playback singer) & Sharreth (composer)

==== Round of 11 (31 August 2009 – 1 September 2009) ====
- Permanent Compere: Bhavna Balakrishnan
- Judges: Nithyasree Mahadevan (Carnatic music exponent & veteran playback singer) & Sharreth (composer)

==== Round of 10 (7 September 2009 – 8 September 2009) ====
- Permanent Compere: Bhavna Balakrishnan
- Judges: Nithyasree Mahadevan (Carnatic music exponent & veteran playback singer) & Sharreth (composer)

==== Round of 9 (14 September 2009 – 15 September 2009) ====
- Permanent Compere: Bhavna Balakrishnan
- Judges: Vani Jairam (veteran playback singer)

==== Round of 8: Jai Ho (21 September 2009 – 22 September 2009) ====
- Permanent Compere: Bhavna Balakrishnan
- Judges: Vani Jairam (veteran playback singer)

This round required the top 8 to perform songs of an Indian patriotic theme.

==== Round of 7: Freestyle Round (28 September 2009 – 29 September 2009) ====
- Permanent Compere: Bhavna Balakrishnan
- Judges: Vani Jairam (veteran playback singer)

This round was a freestyle contestant which permitted the contestants to perform any song they wish. Contestant Deepak and celebrity Vinaya were selected last, and sang the song "Chippi Irukkuthu" originally sung by S. P. Balasubrahmanyam & S. Janaki, with lyrics penned by Kannadasan and music composed by M. S. Viswanathan from the 1980 film Varumayin Niram Sivappu. Anshu and Mansi remained in the elimination circle to face elimination.

=== Finals ===
The finals were held at Kamarajar Arangam. The competition was judged by renowned music personalities, including music director M. S. Viswanathan, as well as veteran playback singers Vani Jairam and Nithyasree Mahadevan, and composer Sharreth. Celebrity playback singers and eliminated contestants also attended the event to support the finalists. Other celebrity personalities were also in attendance at the event and spotted in the audience, including in particular actor-director Cheran, music composer Ramesh Vinayakam, playback singer Chinmayi, and others.

Performances by the finalists of the competition included the following:

Contestant	Song	Original artist	Lyricist	Music composer/director	Source/Movie (year)
Anand	"Oru Naal Podhumaa"	M. Balamuralikrishna	Kannadasan	K. V. Mahadevan	Thiruvilaiyadal (1967)
Bhargavi	"Maalai Pozhuthin Mayakkathile"	P. Susheela	Kannadasan	Viswanathan–Ramamoorthy	Bhagyalakshmi (1961)
Gopalakrishnan	"Ullathil Nalla Ullam"	Sirkazhi Govindarajan	Kannadasan	Viswanathan–Ramamoorthy	Karnan (1964)

At the conclusion of the performances, the judges selected the winner of the competition.

Contestant Anand was crowned the winner of the competition, with contestant Gopalakrishnan being crowned runner-up and contestant Bhargavi being third-placed in the competition.
