= Velayudham (soundtrack) =

- Front Cover

Soundtrack album to Velayudham by Vijay Antony
- Released: 28 August 2011
- Recorded: Audiophiles
- Genre: Feature film soundtrack
- Length: 25:04
- Language: Tamil
- Label: Sony Music Entertainment
- Producer: Vijay Antony

Vijay Antony chronology
Vedi (2011)	Velayudham (2011)	Naan (2012)

Velayudham is the soundtrack album to the 2011 film of the same name directed by Mohan Raja and produced by V. Ravichandran, starring Vijay, Hansika Motwani and Genelia D'Souza. The soundtrack featured six songs with lyrics written by Annamalai, Viveka, Priyan and Siva Shanmugam. It was released through Sony Music Entertainment on 28 August 2011 at an open event in Madurai. The album received positive reviews from critics and sold more than one lakh audio CDs on the day of its release, becoming a commercial success.

== Background ==
Harris Jayaraj was initially approached to compose music for the film, but he declined citing scheduling conflicts. Later, Vijay Antony was signed in as the music composer. The film marked Antony's second collaboration with Vijay after Vettaikaaran (2009) and first with Raja. The soundtrack to the film featured six songs under the lyrics of Annamalai, Viveka, Priyan and Siva Shanmugam, and the songs were performed by Antony, Haricharan, Srimathumitha, V. V. Prasanna, Supriya Joshi, Karthik, Charulatha Mani, Sangeetha Rajeshwaran, Veera Shankar and Mark.

On composing music for Velayudham, Antony had stated "I work for every film with the same amount of diligence. But here it is also the draw of the hero that's working magic for my music" and admitted that Vijay had liked the songs upon first listen. Antony worked on the music discussions with Raja in late-2010 and early-2011, where he sent the tune to Raja after each lyric which he liked. The song "Molachu Moonu" was recorded by Mumbai-based newcomer Supriya Joshi, who sent her demo vocals to Antony on e-mail and thereafter being roped in for recording. Besides composing, Antony had further sung two songs—"Sonna Puriyadhu" and "Vela Vela".

With Vijay Antony's use of gibberish words in the lyrics, he also coined the term "Chillax" for the romantic number pictured on Vijay and Hansika. He added "I intend relegating such rigmarole to the background for a while because my melodies get buried in the bargain. All the same, on the very day of the audio release everyone in the crowd screamed 'Chillax.' So the draw of such usages is obvious." Prior to the film's music launch, three songs from the album were leaked onto the internet.

== Release ==
Initially, the makers planned to host the audio launch of Velayudham during the summer of that year, and also intended to invite the then-Chief Minister of Tamil Nadu J. Jayalalithaa for the event, which did not happen. Later, the audio launch was held at the CSI Grounds in Madurai on 28 August 2011, the first instance where a music launch event was held in the southern part of Tamil Nadu. Vijay, Hansika Motwani, S. A. Chandrasekhar, Vijay Antony, Viveka and several distributors and theatre owners were present in the function. The audio CDs were distributed by two fans of the actor, Uma Maheshwari and Deepak. Within its launch into the market, the album sold more than 100,000 CDs on the first day of its release.

== Reception ==
"We are overwhelmed with the response the movie and the music have received. Velayudham has broken all records and we have sold all our units within a day of its launch. The soundtracks are original, soulful and memorable. We're sure that the compositions will go down in history as some of the best melodies of our times."

— Ashok Parwani, marketing director of Sony Music Entertainment Chennai, on the success of Velayudham's music.

Pavithra Srinivasan of Rediff gave 3/5 stars and wrote "For an album that's got promising numbers like Rathathin Rathame and Molachu Moonu, Velayudham steadily descends into the mandatory Vijay album with the requisite kuthu and fan-pleasing songs. Vijay Antony plays it safe mostly, with the result that there's nothing new." S. R. Ashok Kumar of The Hindu admitted that the songs are "an assortment of melodies and peppy numbers". Karthik Srinivasan of Milliblog wrote "Composer Vijay Antony did start the soundtrack well, but sadly loses track after those two lovely songs."

A reviewer based at Indo-Asian News Service wrote "Vijay Antony's music is not fine but fits the bill. Placement of songs weakens the flow of the script." Sify wrote "One major plus for the movie is Vijay Antony's songs which are melodious and mass. The Vijay introductory song Sonna Puriyadhu.., Chillaxxx.. and Molachu Moonu... are the pick of the lot." N. Venkateswaran of The Times of India stated that composer Vijay Antony is "on a roll, and 'Velayudham' is one of his best albums this year. 'Molachu moonu', beautifully sung by Prasanna and Supriya Joshi, is the pick of the lot, though 'Chillax' (Karthik and Charulatha Mani) and 'Maayam Seidhayo' (Sangeetha Rajeshwaran) are also pleasant on the ear."

== Track list ==
No.	Title	Lyrics	Singer(s)	Length
1.	"Rathathin Rathame"	Annamalai	Haricharan, Srimathumitha	4:38
2.	"Molachu Moonu"	Viveka	V. V. Prasanna, Supriya Joshi	4:52
3.	"Chillax"	Annamalai	Karthik, Charulatha Mani	4:25
4.	"Mayam Seidhayo"	Viveka	Sangeetha Rajeshwaran	4:14
5.	"Sonna Puriyadhu"	Siva Shanmugam	Vijay Antony, Veera Shankar	5:39
6.	"Vela Vela Velayutham"	Priyan	Vijay Antony, Mark	1:16
Total length:				25:04

== Awards and nominations ==
Award	Date of ceremony (Note: Date is linked to the article about the awards held that year, wherever possible.)	Category	Recipient(s) and nominee(s)	Result	Ref.
South Indian International Movie Awards	21–22 June 2012	Best Male Playback Singer – Tamil	V. V. Prasanna for "Molachu Moonu"	Nominated	
