= Prabhakar Panshikar =

Indian actor (1931–2011)

- प्रभाकर पणशीकर
- Born: 14 March 1931; Bombay, Bombay Presidency, British India
- Died: 13 January 2011 (aged 79); Pune, Maharashtra, India
- Occupations: Actor, Film producer, Writer
- Years active: 1955–2009
- Notable work: To Mi Navhech (तो मी नव्हेच)
- Spouse: Vijaya Kulkarni
- Children: 3, including Raghunandan Panshikar

Prabhakar Panshikar (Marathi: प्रभाकर पणशीकर) (14 March 1931 – 13 January 2011) also known as Pant was an actor on Marathi Stage. His character as Lakhoba Lokhande in the drama To Mi Navhech, written by Prahlad Keshav Atre is considered to be one of the immortal roles presented so far on the Marathi theatre. Five unique characters played in this drama To Mee Navhech made him famous in Marathi theatre and Maharashtra. He also performed Aurangzeb's role in a play Ithe Oshalala Mrutyu based on the death of Sambhaji Raje Bhosale. He was the owner of Natyasampada, a Marathi drama production organization.

== Biography ==
Panshikar was born into a family of Karhade Brahmin in Phanaswadi, Mumbai. His forefathers had been Sanskrit scholars with his Grandfather translating into Marathi Nighantu Ratnakar, the authoritative manual of Ayurvedic treatment. He had three brothers who were all masters of Sanskrit language. The Panshikar are originally from Goa, with their roots in the Panshi village in Pernem Taluka.

Prabhakar had enacted in Khotachiwadi when he spend some time at Ramji Purshottam Chawl – V.P. Road. Younger Prabhakar was engrossed in acting and theaters from his childhood. During his school days, he not just watched several famous plays from renowned theater companies, but also he performed them in Ganesha Festival at Girgaon, Mumbai. His passion towards drama took him away from family in his early teens. Later on 13 March 1955, he began his profession in Marathi Stage with a play Ranicha Baag. At the age of 25, he joined writer-director M. G. Rangnekar's organization Natyaniketan and started to act in plays like Kulwadhu, Bhumikanya Sita, Vahini, and Khadashtak.

Initially, Panshikar worked and acted under the guidance of veteran Marathi drama director M.G. Rangnekar. Rangnekar gave him his break in the play To Mi Navhech by offering him the main role in 1962. The show became so popular that it was subsequently translated into other Indian languages like Gujarati and Kannada. He has to his credit the distinction of performing as an actor & producer on screen, stage and television. He formed an organization named Natyasampada and he developed local artists and launched them in cities like Pune, Mumbai, Kolhapur, Nagpur etc. He has spent 53 years on stage with over 8000 performances to his credit. Panshikar also produced very famous Marathi play Katyar Kaljat Ghusali under his organization. Based on the play a record breaking Marathi movie was released with the same name, in which famous Marathi actor Sachin Pilgaonkar and renowned singer Shankar Mahadevan played lead roles.

== Personal life ==
Panshikar was married to Vijaya (née Kulkarni), with whom he had three children and seven grand children. His elder daughter, Janhavi Panshikar-Singh, is also an actress. She is married to TV actor Shakti Singh. Panshikar's son, Raghunandan Panshikar, is Hindustani classical singer and is a disciple of noted singer Kishori Amonkar. Raghunandan is married to Aparna Deshpande and the couple have two children. Panshikar's younger daughter, Tarangini, is a gold medallist in Sanskrit. She is married to marine engineer Narendra Khot. They have two children.

== Death ==
Panshikar died in Pune on 13 January 2011 from cardiac arrest.

== Selected plays ==
- Bhatala Dili Osari
- To Mee Navhech
- Ithe Oshalla Mrutyu
- Ashroonchi Zhali Phule
- Thank You Mr.Glad
- Jithe Gavtala Bhale Phuttat
- Jwalamukhi

== Selected plays as producer ==
- Sangeet Madanachi Manjiri
- Sangeet Suvarna Tula
- Katyar Kaljat Ghusali
- Andhar Maza Sobati
- Kimayagar
- Putrakameshti
- "Sangeet Awagha Rang Ekachi Zaala"
- "Many Happy Returns (Marathi Play)"
- "Vichcha Majhi Puri Karaa"
- "Varyavarchi Varaat"
- "Lekure Udand Jaali"
- "Lagnachi Bedi"

== Honours and awards ==
- Vishnudas Bhave Suvarnapadak
- Zee Chitra Gaurav Lifetime Achievement
- Rajarshee Shahu Suvarnapadak
- Natyagaurav Puraskar
- Sanget Natak Akademi Puraskar
- Natasamrat Bal Gandharva Smriti Puraskar
- Natashreshtha keshavrao Date Puraskar
- Dr.Kashinath Ghanekar Smriti Puraskar
- Natvarya Dattaram Puraskar
- Acharya Atre Puraskar
- Kalashri Puraskar
- Uttung Puraskar
- Maharashtra Gaurav Puraskar
- Jagatik Marathi Parishad Puraskar
- Dinanath Mangeshkar Smriti Puraskar
- NatyaDarpan -'Man of the Year'
- Natasamrat Nanasaheb Phatak Smriti Puraskar
- Navratna Puraskar
- Ratnappa Kumbhar Puraskar
- Maharashtra Bhushan Puraskar
- First Jeevan Gaurav Puraskar of State Govt., Maharashtra, later this award was named Prabhakar Panshikar award.

== See also ==
- Karhade Brahmin
- List of Marathi people
