= Woh Main Nahin =

- Directed by: Mohan Segal
- Written by: Ali Raza
- Based on: To Mee Navhech by Pralhad Keshav Atre
- Produced by: Mohan Segal
- Starring: Navin Nischol; Rekha
- Cinematography: Sergei Anufriyev; Aleksandr Kovalchuk; Peter Pereira
- Edited by: Pratap Dave
- Music by: Sonik Omi
- Production company: Filmcenter
- Distributed by: Uma Cine Films Pvt. Ltd.
- Release date: 25 October 1974
- Running time: 142 minutes
- Country: India
- Language: Hindi

Woh Main Nahin (transl. I Am Not Him) is a 1974 Indian Hindi-language film directed by Mohan Segal with Navin Nischol and Rekha in the lead and Shaukat Kaifi, Iftekhar, Rakesh Pandey and Padmini Kapila in supporting roles. It is an adaptation of the 1962 Marathi language play To Mee Navhech written by Pralhad Keshav Atre.

== Plot ==
The story revolves around Vijay being convicted for forgery/fraud/murder related crimes in the court of law. Vijay refutes all charges levied by public prosecutor Iftekhar and pleads not-guilty for all crimes he is charged with. The defense lawyer seems to be too timid to save him. Anjali helps Vijay in the trial proceedings and they find out that it was Vijay's friend Ranjeet, who was behind all the crimes. This guy resembled Vijay and all people mistakenly believed Vijay was the fraudster.

== Cast ==
- Navin Nischol as Vijay/ Salimuddin/ Diwakar Ganesh Datar/ Daji Shastri/ Ashok Paranjape/ Baba Radheshyam
- Rekha as Anjali
- Rakesh Pandey as Ranjeet
- Asha Sachdev as Pamela
- Padmini Kapila as Sunanda Datar
- Nazneen as Venu
- Iftekhar as Prosecution Lawyer
- Shaukat Azmi as Mrs. Shaikh Mansoor
- Nadira as Gangu Tai Ghotale
- Narendranath as Vishambhar
- Krishan Dhawan as Shaikh Mansoor
- Chaman Puri as Sunanda's Father
- Dhumal as Subrahmanyam
- Gajanan Jagirdar as Judge
- Sophia as Sultana
- Manhar Desai as Dwarkadas
- Meena Rai as Mrs. Dwarkadas

== Soundtrack ==
No.	Title	Singer(s)	Length
1.	"Chahe Purush Ho, Chahe Nari"	Kishore Kumar
2.	"Honthon Se Kayi Lutaye Tarane"	Kishore Kumar, Asha Bhosle
3.	"Mera Roop, Mera Rang, Mere Chalne Ka Dhang"	Asha Bhosle, Mohammed Rafi
4.	"Cheech-O-Cheech Ganeria"	Asha Bhosle
5.	"Tujhe Ek Ladki Mile Jawan"	Asha Bhosle
