= Yaavum Vasappadum =

- Directed by: Pudhiyavan Rasaiah
- Written by: Pudhiyavan Rasaiah
- Starring: Vijith; Dhilmika; Bala
- Cinematography: N. T. Nandha
- Edited by: Suresh Urs
- Music by: R. K. Sundar
- Production companies: Nomad Team Ltd; AAA Productions
- Release date: 10 December 2014
- Country: India
- Language: Tamil

Yaavum Vasappadum is a 2014 Indian Tamil-language thriller film written and directed by Pudhiyavan Rasaiah and starring Vijith, Dhilmika, and Bala. The film was released to negative reviews.

== Cast ==
- Vijith as Raman
- Dhilmika as Dhil
- Bala as Diva
- Bobby
- Dr. Vivek
- Andrew
- Kannan
- Chandran

== Production ==
This is the second film of Pudhiyavan Rasaiah, a Sri Lankan Tamil immigrant, who previously directed Mann (2006). The film was entirely shot in London. Much of the crew of the film is from the Tamil diaspora including United Kingdom, Canada, and France.

== Reception ==
Malini Mannath of The New Indian Express wrote, "One can understand the enthusiasm of the team to make a film in Tamil and showcase it here. But enthusiasm and passion alone cannot guarantee a good film". A critic from Dinamalar felt that the film showed that Indians abroad can make films too but felt that the film tested the audience's patience. A critic from iFlicks wrote, "The movie predominantly revolves around the trio (of Vijith, Dhilmika, and Bala) and many scenes lack continuity. Moreover there are lot of twists and turns that irritates the viewers".
