= Mahatma Phule (film) =

- Directed by: Pralhad Keshav Atre
- Written by: B. R. Ambedkar
- Produced by: Atre Pictures
- Release date: 1954
- Country: India
- Language: Marathi

Mahatma Phule is a 1954 Marathi film directed by Pralhad Keshav Atre. The film is based on the life of social reformer and activist Jyotirao Govindrao Phule.

The film won National Film Award for Best Feature Film in Marathi.

== Plot ==
The film is a biopic based on the life and works of Phule. Phule was a social reformer and revolutionary activist from Maharashtra, India. Born in a socially backward class in nineteenth century India, along with his wife Savitribai Phule and others he worked for the upliftment of masses of lower caste. He was the pioneer of women's education in Maharashtra and set up the first school for girls in Budhwar Peth, Pune in January 1848.

== Cast ==
- Baburao Pendharkar as Mahatma Phule
  - Bapurao Mane as Young Phule
- Sulochana as Savitribai Phule
- Damuanna Joshi as Govindrao Phule
- Amar Sheikh as Shahir Dhondiram
- Saraswati Bodas as Phule's Aunt
- Keshavrao Thackeray as Upadhye
- Vasantrao Pehelwan as Lahuji Buva
- Vasundhara as Kashibai

== Awards ==
The film won the first prestigious President's silver medal for Best Feature Film (Rajat Kamal) in Marathi in the 2nd National Film Awards function presented on 21 December 1955.
