= Buddhivantha =

- Theatrical release poster
- Directed by: Ramnath Rugvedhi
- Written by: Upendra (dialogue)
- Based on: To Mee Navhech by Pralhad Keshav Atre
- Produced by: SV Rajendra Singh Babu; A Mohan
- Starring: Upendra; Pooja Gandhi; Brinda Parekh; Saloni Aswani; Natanya Singh; Suman Ranganathan
- Cinematography: R. Giri
- Edited by: Govardhan
- Music by: Vijay Antony
- Release date: 26 September 2008
- Running time: 145 minutes
- Country: India
- Language: Kannada
- Budget: ₹4.5 crore
- Box office: ₹15 crore

Buddhivantha (transl. Genius) is a 2008 Indian Kannada-language romantic crime thriller film directed by Ramnath Rigvedhi. starring Upendra in the lead role, while Pooja Gandhi, Brinda Parekh, Saloni Aswani, Natanya Singh, and Suman Ranganathan play the female leads. The film is a remake of the 2007 Tamil film Naan Avanillai, which itself was a remake of the 1974 Tamil film, Naan Avanillai, which in turn was based on the 1962 Marathi play, To Mee Navhech (transl. I Am Not Him) written by Pralhad K. Atre. The music was composed by Vijay Antony.

The film was released on 26 September 2008. It was supposed to be released on Upendra's birthday, 18 September 2008, but because of the delay in censor certification, the date was postponed to 26 September 2008. It became the highest grossing Kannada film of 2008. It went on to complete over a 100-day theatrical run in the main centers of Karnataka.

== Plot ==
The story begins with Panchamrutha (Upendra) standing in the court facing charges of cheating four beautiful women and the public prosecutor (Siddaraj Kalyankar) heaping more and more charges against him. Panchamrutha, who speaks in typical Mangalorean Kannada, denies having any links with these beautiful women and also argues his case to prove that he is innocent. Much to the dismay of the girls, police department, and PP, the judgement goes in favor of Panchamrutha and the judge (Lakshmi), who is the mother of Pooja (Pooja Gandhi), and sets him free.

Panchamrutha again ends up in the court due to cheating the beautiful daughter of the judge herself. The lawmakers are bent upon getting him convicted and they rope in his brother, but then, the smart man that he is, Panchamrutha gives his logic and again he emerges successful. The girls – Pooja, Rekha (Brinda Parekh), Shanthi (Saloni Aswani), Rani (Natanya Singh), and Monika (Suman Ranganathan) – are helpless, but then the time for truth comes. Apparently, Panchamrutha is the man who donned the roles of Zakir Hussain, Samarasimha Reddy, Ashok Mittal, Shyamprasad, and Rajneesh. All this he does with only one mission – to teach these arrogant and haughty women a lesson and cut them down to size. There is a very strong flashback connected to it that leads to the death of his sister-in-law, and that is when the peace-loving Panchamrutha became a skilled conman for greedy women. His flashback leads him to cheat girls, but he would not cheat any. Instead, he would be taught the reality of four girls except Pooja.

Zakir Hussain (Upendra) gets together with Pooja, and the pair walks away happily, leaving the audience to assume that they live happily ever after.

== Cast ==
- Upendra as Panchamrutha/Joseph Fernandes/Zakir Hussain/Vijay Mittal/Samarasimha Reddy/Sri Sri Sri Bhagavan Ranjaneesh Swamy/Shyam Prasad
- Pooja Gandhi as Pooja, a law student
- Brinda Parekh as Rekha Mithal
- Saloni Aswani as Shanthi (Bangaaru)
- Natanya Singh as Rani (Radhe)
- Suman Ranganathan as Monika, an industrialist
- Lakshmi as Pooja's mother, a judge
- Hema Choudhary as Chandrabai, Rani's mother
- Sridhar as David Fernandes, brother of Joseph Fernandes
- Dharma as Rekha's brother
- Chidanand as Johnny Walker
- Ambareesh Sarangi
- Roopesh Jain
- B. Jayamma
- Rekha Kumar
- Jaya Prakash Reddy as Veera Raghava Reddy (Archival footage of Samarasimha Reddy)
- Sri Gowri
- Shankar Gowda
- G. K. Govinda Rao
- Bank Janardhan as Police Constable
- Raj Kapoor as Investigation Officer
- Siddaraj Kalyankar as Public Prosecutor
- Shankar Gowda in a cameo appearance

== Soundtrack ==
The soundtrack of Buddhivantha received an amazing response upon its audio release and turned out to be one of the best selling albums of the year. The official soundtrack contains seven songs composed by Vijay Antony with the lyrics primarily penned by Kaviraj and Upendra. The audio of the film was released on 18 June 2008, three months before the release of the film. The album was released by Times Music. Except "Chitranna" which was reused from Vijay Antony's own composition "Dailamo" from Dishyum, he retained other tunes from the original Tamil film.

Buddhivantha

Studio album by Vijay Antony
- Released: 18 June 2008 (CD release)
- Genre: Feature film soundtrack
- Length: 34:39
- Label: Junglee Music
- Producers: S V Rajendra Singh Babu, A Mohan

Vijay Antony chronology
Pandhayam (2008)	Buddhivantha (2008)	Kadhalil Vizhunthen (2008)

Song	Singer(s)	Duration	Lyrics
"Naan Avanalla"	Vijay Antony, Vinay, Charulatha Mani, Maaya, Megha	05:07	Kaviraj
"Raa Raa Raa Raaja"	Jayadevan, Sangeetha Rajeshwaran	05:36	Kaviraj
"Chitranna Chitranna"	Vijay Antony, Sangeetha Rajeshwaran	04:50	Upendra
"Harinanda Harinanda"	V. V. Prasanna, Maaya, Sangeetha Rajeshwaran	05:14	Kaviraj
"Ravivarmana"	Hariharan, Kaushik, Vinaya	04:24	R. N. Jayagopal
"Nee Nanage Beku"	Krish, Megha	04:40	Kaviraj
"Chitranna Chitranna" (remix)	Upendra, Sangeetha Rajeshwaran	04:48	Upendra

== Critical response ==
Now running.com gave the film a 3 out of 5 and wrote, "Upendra sparkles as an actor. Pooja Gandhi's performance is good, but it is Suman Ranganathan who makes a big impact. Veteran actors Lakshmi, Dharma, Sridhar, and Hema Chowdhary are all impressive in their respective roles."

== Box office ==
=== Karnataka ===
The film was the highest grossing Kannada film of 2008, by collecting more than ₹ 150 million at the box office. It completed 100 days screening in more than 25 centres all over Karnataka.

=== Andhra Pradesh ===
The Telugu version of the film was released as Budhimanthudu in Andhra Pradesh. It completed 50 days of run and did decent business at the box office across Andhra Pradesh.

== Sequel ==
Buddhivantha 2 was announced in 2019.
