= Dishyum =

2006 film directed by Sasi

- DVD cover
- Directed by: Sasi
- Written by: Sasi
- Produced by: V. Ravichandran
- Starring: Jiiva; Sandhya
- Cinematography: Santonio Terzio
- Edited by: Peter Babiya
- Music by: Vijay Antony
- Distributed by: Aascar Film Pvt. Ltd
- Release date: 2 February 2006
- Running time: 133 minutes
- Country: India
- Language: Tamil

Dishyum (transl. Tussle) is a 2006 Indian Tamil-language action romance film written and directed by Sasi. The film stars Jiiva and Sandhya in the lead roles, while Guinness Pakru, Nassar, and Malavika Avinash play supporting roles. The film's score and soundtrack are composed by Vijay Antony. The film was released on 2 February 2006.

== Plot ==
Bhaskar, a stuntman, is smitten with Cynthia, a college student. However, his heart is broken when he learns that she doesn't love him back, but he still to tries persuade her.

== Cast ==
- Jiiva as "Risk" Bhaskar
- Sandhya as Cynthia
- Guinness Pakru as Amitabh, Bhaskar's friend
- Nassar as Jayachandran
- Anee Malavika as Malar
- Kaajal Pasupathi as Cynthia's friend
- Kasi as Kasi
- Mahanadi Shankar as Shankar, Bhaskar's colleague and friend
- SJ Suryah as himself (cameo)
- Vishal as himself (cameo)
- Ghilli Maran as Maran

== Production ==
The producers of the film had initially signed Pooja to play the lead role in January 2005, before Sandhya replaced her. Before Jiiva was brought on board, the film was shot for approximately ten days with actor Ashok Kumar, who was not paid for the role. Vijay Sethupathi played a police officer and was paid 250 rupees for the initial version, which was later scrapped. The film was reshot with Jiiva. He had previously trained in Kung fu for three years, underwent gymnastics training for his role as a stuntman. He performed some of the stunts himself, and was accompanied by stunt directors all the time. He further revealed stuntmen were the first to see the film.

== Soundtrack ==
The music for Dishyum was composed by Vijay Antony. The song "Dailamo Dailamo" was later reused in the Kannada film Buddhivantha (2008).. The starting guitar music and the interludes of the song "Bhoomikku" is based on the song "Tamally Maak" by Amr Diab.

Song	Singers	Lyricist	Length
"Bhoomiku"	Gayathri, Vijay Antony, Rahul Nambiar	Vairamuthu	4:37
"Dailamo Dailamo"	Sangeetha Rajeshwaran, Vijay Antony	Vijay Antony	4:28
"Kitta Neringivaadi"	Sukhwinder Singh, Vinaya	Na. Muthukumar	4:17
"Nenjangootil"	Jayadev, Rajalakshmi	Vairamuthu	4:36
"Poo Meedhu"	Malgudi Subha	Pugazhendhi	4:36

== Release ==
Dishyum was initially scheduled to release on 26 January 2026, but released a week later, 2 February.

== Critical reception ==
Sify wrote, "This romantic feel-good film will make you think as the screenplay is written intelligently on the bitter-sweet nature of love". Lajjavathi of Kalki praised the acting of Jiiva, Sandhya and other actors, Vijay Antony's music and Santonio's cinematography but found climax to be dramatic which Sasi could have been avoided and added slowly developing love and increasing interest little by little, the film is completed with a thump that is a success for the direction.

== Accolades ==
Jiiva and Sandhya won the Tamil Nadu State Film Award Special Prizes for Best Actor and Actress respectively.
