= Suresh Urs =

Indian film editor

- Born: Karnataka, India
- Occupation: Film editor
- Spouse: Mala S. Urs
- Relatives: Sundar Krishna Urs (brother)
- Awards: National Film Award for Best Editing

Suresh Urs is an Indian film editor who works predominantly in Kannada and Tamil cinema. He has edited over 700 films and 40 documentaries and television shows. Urs is well known for his association with directors like Girish Karnad, Mani Ratnam, Shankar Nag, T. S. Nagabharana, Girish Kasaravalli, P. Vasu, Bala, Saran and Baraguru Ramachandrappa. He was awarded the National Film Award for Best Editing for his work in Bombay (1995). He also won a national award for best editing (non-feature) for Madhyantara in 2022. Besides, he is a recipient of five Karnataka State Film Awards and two Tamil Nadu State Film Awards. He was also honored to win the Karnataka State Rajyotsava Prashasti. Lifetime Achievement Vishnuvardhan Award from Karnataka Government in 2014.

== Early life ==
Suresh Urs was born in Kollegala, Karnataka, India to K C Chamaraje Urs, a farmer, and Devajammanni.

In the late 1970s, Suresh worked with Sundar Krishna Urs, his brother and a noted actor, and later served as an assistant director and assistant editor. The television series Malgudi Days (1986) gave Suresh a significant break as an editor. This led director Mani Ratnam to hire him for Thalapathi (1991).

== Awards ==
- National Film Awards
  - 1995: Best Editing: Bombay
  - 2022-23: Best Editing: short film - Madyantara
- Karnataka State Film Awards
  - 2010-11: Best Editing: Aidondla Aidu
  - 2007-08: Best Editing: Savi Savi Nenapu
  - 1991-92: Best Editing: Mysooru Mallige
  - 1989-90: Best Editing: Panchama Veda
  - 1980-81: Best Editing: Mooru Daarigalu

== Partial filmography ==
Year	Film	Language	Notes
1983	Banker Margayya	Kannada	
1986	Malgudi Days	English; Hindi	Television series
1987	Ee Bandha Anubandha	Kannada	
1988	Aasphota	Kannada	
1989	Idu Saadhya	Kannada	
1989	Ramanujacharya	Tamil	
1989	Kanaka Purandara	Kannada	Films Division documentary (dir: Girish Karnad)
1990	Panchama Veda	Kannada	Karnataka State Film Award for Best Editor
1990	Ganeshana Maduve	Kannada	
1991	Gauri Ganesha	Kannada	
1991	Thalapathi	Tamil	
1992	Chaitrada Premanjali	Kannada	
1992	Mysooru Mallige	Kannada	Karnataka State Film Award for Best Editor
1992	Cheluvi	Hindi	
1992	Roja	Tamil	
1993	Baa Nalle Madhuchandrake	Kannada	
1993	Thiruda Thiruda	Tamil	Tamil Nadu State Film Award for Best Editor
1995	Bombay	Tamil	National Film Award for Best Editing
1996	Kalki	Tamil	
1997	Aahaa..!	Tamil	
1997	Devathai	Tamil	
1997	Minsara Kanavu	Tamil	
1997	Ee Hrudaya Ninagaagi	Kannada	
1997	Iruvar	Tamil	
1998	Bhoomi Thayiya Chochchala Maga	Kannada	
1998	Dil Se..	Hindi	
1998	Pooveli	Tamil	
1999	Aryabhata	Kannada	
1999	Amarkkalam	Tamil	
1999	Rojavanam	Tamil	
1999	Sangamam	Tamil	
1999	Mechanic Mavayya	Telugu	
1999	Unnaruge Naan Irundhal	Tamil	
2000	Kandukondain Kandukondain	Tamil	
2000	Mugavaree	Tamil	
2000	Parthen Rasithen	Tamil	
2001	Alli Arjuna	Tamil	
2001	Dheena	Tamil	
2001	Nandhaa	Tamil	
2001	Minnale	Tamil	
2001	Paarthale Paravasam	Tamil	
2002	Gemini	Tamil	
2002	Mounam Pesiyadhe	Tamil	
2002	Ooruku Nooruper	Tamil	
2002	Urumattram	Tamil	
2002	Ramanaa	Tamil	
2002	Thulluvadho Ilamai	Tamil	
2002	Virumbugiren	Tamil	
2003	Aahaa Ethanai Azhagu	Tamil	
2003	Bheeshmar	Tamil	
2003	Indru	Tamil	
2003	Jay Jay	Tamil	
2003	Kadhal Sadugudu	Tamil	
2003	Pithamagan	Tamil	
2003	Soori	Tamil	
2003	The Hero: Love Story of a Spy	Hindi	
2003	Thirumalai	Tamil	
2004	Rightaa Thappaa	Tamil	
2004	Shanti	Kannada	
2004	Poorvapara	Kannada	
2004	Sullan	Tamil	
2004	Vasool Raja MBBS	Tamil	
2004	Vishwa Thulasi	Tamil	
2004	Attahasam	Tamil	
2004	Santhosha	Kannada	
2005	Shanti	Kannada	
2005	Chandramukhi	Tamil	
2005	Naa Oopiri	Telugu	
2005	February 14	Tamil	
2005	Maayavi	Tamil	
2005	Sukran	Tamil	
2006	Boys and Girls	Tamil	
2006	Aathi	Tamil	
2006	Idhaya Thirudan	Tamil	
2006	Jambhavan	Tamil	
2006	Kurukshetram	Tamil	
2006	Paramasivan	Tamil	
2006	Sivappathigaram	Tamil	
2006	Ghatak	Bengali	
2006	Mann	Tamil	
2007	Muni	Tamil	
2007	Mudhal Kanave	Tamil	
2007	I Love You	Bengali	
2007	Savi Savi Nenapu	Kannada	
2008	Gaalipata	Kannada	
2008	Moggina Manasu	Kannada	
2008	Pandi	Tamil	
2008	Sangama	Kannada	
2009	Naan Kadavul	Tamil	
2009	Mayandi Kudumbathar	Tamil	
2009	Sirithal Rasipen	Tamil	
2009	Love Guru	Kannada	
2009	Anthony Yaar?	Tamil	
2010	Aptharakshaka	Kannada	
2010	Parole	Kannada	
2010	Baana Kaathadi	Tamil	
2010	Naayaka	Kannada	
2011	Avan Ivan	Tamil	
2011	Keratam	Telugu	
2011	Sadhurangam	Tamil	
2011	Thambi Vettothi Sundaram	Tamil	
2011	Putra	Kannada	
2011	Ujwadu	Konkani	
2011	Mahaan Kanakku	Tamil	also actor
2012	Medhai	Tamil	
2012	Naanga	Tamil	
2012	Ullam	Tamil	
2012	Narasimha	Kannada	
2012	Billa II	Tamil	
2012	Pollangu	Tamil	
2012	Puthumugangal Thevai	Tamil	
2013	Kantha	Tamil	
2013	Isakki	Tamil	
2013	Thiru Pugazh	Tamil	
2013	Pyarge Aagbittaite	Kannada	
2013	Kolagalam	Tamil	
2014	Ninaivil Nindraval	Tamil	
2014	Kalkandu	Tamil	
2014	Vanmam	Tamil	
2014	Yaavum Vasappadum	Tamil	
2014	Pagadai Pagadai	Tamil	
2015	Pulan Visaranai 2	Tamil	
2015	Maha Maha	Tamil	
2015	Nathikal Nanaivathillai	Tamil	
2015	Sathuran	Tamil	
2015	Octopus	Kannada	
2016	Shivalinga	Kannada	
2016	Arthanari	Tamil	
2016	Neer Dose	Kannada	
2016	Naalu Peru Naalu Vidhama Pesuvaanga	Tamil	
2016	Nunnunarvu	Tamil	
2016	Karam Dosa	Telugu	
2017	Shivalinga	Tamil	
2017	Ayyanar Veethi	Tamil	
2017	Palli Paruvathile	Tamil	
2018	Parole	Malayalam	
2018	Kammara Sambhavam	Malayalam	
2018	Kannakkol	Tamil	
2018	Otrai Panai Maram	Tamil	
2019	Kadhal Munnetra Kazhagam	Tamil	
2019	Talaq Talaq Talaq	Kannada	
2020	Pachai Vilakku	Tamil	
2021	Engada Iruthinga Ivvalavu Naala	Tamil	
2022	Otru	Tamil	
2022	Thimayya & Thimayya	Kannada	
2022	Madhyantara	Kannada	National Award for Best Editing (Non-Feature)
2023	Garadi	Kannada	
2023	Jersey Number 10	Kannada	
2024	Pambattam	Tamil	
2026	Vasool Mannan	Tamil	
2026	Sky	Telugu	
