= Naan Avan Illai (2007 film) =

- Theatrical release poster
- Directed by: Selvaa
- Screenplay by: Selvaa; Pattukkottai Prabakar (dialogues)
- Story by: K. Balachander
- Produced by: V. Hitesh Jhabak
- Starring: Jeevan; Sneha; Namitha; Malavika; Jyothirmayi; Keerthi Chawla
- Cinematography: U. K. Senthil Kumar
- Edited by: Suresh Urs
- Music by: Vijay Antony
- Production company: Nemichand Jhabak
- Release date: 14 April 2007
- Running time: 147 minutes
- Country: India
- Language: Tamil

Naan Avan Illai (transl. I am not him) is a 2007 Indian Tamil-language romantic crime thriller film directed by Selvaa. It is a remake of the 1974 Tamil film, itself based on the 1962 the Marathi play To Mee Navhech. The film stars Jeevan, Sneha, Namitha, Malavika, Jyothirmayi and Keerthi Chawla. It follows a man who is tried in court for marrying and cheating several women under different identities.

Naan Avan Illai was released on Tamil Puthandu Chithirai 1 14 April 2007. The film was remade in Kannada in 2008 as Buddhivantha, and a sequel titled Naan Avan Illai 2 was released in 2009.

== Plot ==
A wedding advertisement of leading businesswoman Monika with a gentleman brings up a flurry of girls to the police, each one of them claiming the young groom in the picture to be their husband. Puzzled at first, the police slowly realises that they are dealing with a clever and elaborate con artist and womaniser who impresses beautiful girls with elaborate bluffs to a quick marriage and escapes with their money/jewelry after sleeping with them. The police sends out a look out notice with the photo and the man is shown outsmarting the police narrowly on many tough situations, but once the bus he is in gets into an accident sending everyone on board unconscious, and he is inevitably picked up by the police from the hospital.

However the police soon realise that the guy is a tough nut to crack. He claims to be an innocent village simpleton named Annamalai with no connection to any of the cases dumped on him. They also realise that he has left no solid evidences around any of his conjobs that could be traced to his flesh and blood. To all the charges against him the cool, smooth-talking, and confident Annamalai has only one constant answer – "Naan Avan Illai" (I am not him). Monika is shocked but refuses to believe that her lover could be the conman that the police make out. Produced before the court, he adopts the brilliant tactic of not denying the reality of any of the conjobs but just that he is not the man – "Naan Avan Illai" (I am not him), leaving even the Judge Sharada in a fix. The principal complainants are three women — Rekha, Ammukutty Menon, and Rani — all of whom recollect their encounters with the guy in court.

Rekha is pursuing a modelling career when she picks up a cell phone on the way to get a call from its owner, a young man who calls himself Vignesh. He introduces himself as a millionaire businessman based in London who flies the world on a regular basis and has all influential connections, and Rekha soon falls head over heels over him when he offers to promote her dream acting career. Even her businessman brother Thyagu falls for his charms when he hands over 25 lakhs to bribe a minister in order to approve a tender of Thyagu's. The impressed brother-sister duo proposes marriage to Vignesh, which he readily accepts. When Vignesh says that his mother in London has fixed a billionaire foreigner for his wife, which shall happen as soon as he returns to London, Thyagu offers to conduct Rekha's marriage with him the very next day so that Rekha could go with him as his wife and convince his family. Thus, the marriage happens in the auspices of Rekha's family with nobody on part of Vignesh present. Vignesh and Rekha consummate their marriage at a resort of her family friend's offering, but Rekha wakes up in the morning to see Vignesh missing. She has not heard from him ever since.

Ammukutty is a young scion of the Cochin royal family who has to deal with an unpleasant fiancée at home when she meets a young man apparently by chance on the road who claims to be Madhavan Menon from Thrissur. She easily falls for his charms and later gets to hear from a call on his cell phone that he is actually a scion of the Travancore royal family and is out from home to escape a marriage he does not like. Impressed, she proposes him and plans to elope on the day of her marriage. Madhavan enters the ceremony in the guise of the officiating priest and cleverly manages to run away with her. As he cannot go to his own family as per his story, they settle anonymously at Trivandrum and consummate their marriage. At the end of the day when Madhavan gets a call from Napoleon reminding him of a deadline to pay some 10 lakhs regarding his business, Ammukutty readily offers her jewellery, which Madhavan reluctantly accepts and leaves. She has not heard from him since.

Chandra was a naïve godwoman who ran a spiritual ashram with her young daughter Rani when Hariharan Das turns up as a young spiritual master from some superior ashram in the Himalayas. He soon convinces everyone that he is an incarnation of Lord Krishna himself while Rani is an incarnation of none other than the divine Radha. Their marriage is soon arranged, and they consummate the marriage in a form in an extended rasaleela. Soon, he escapes with all the ashram jewellery during a supposed miracle show.

Monika is a billionaire businesswoman and a divorcee who happens to hire a young man who calls himself Shyam Prasad as her marketing manager. Lonely longing for love and trying to escape her impotent ex-husband, she easily falls for Shyam's charms, and the adept Shyam soon enters her bed even without any pretense of a marriage. She is still head over heels in love with her hero after all the bad news has come out.

Throughout the court proceedings, Annamalai defends his case brilliantly by repeatedly pinpointing that every one of the crimes narrated by the women could be true and the person who committed it might look like himself, but it just happens that he is not the man – "Naan Avan Illai" (I am not him). The police even trace his associate "Napoleon" who is actually Alex Thambidurai. However this turns useless as "Annamalai" resorts to his usual "Naan Avan Illai" and Thambidurai too cannot bring any evidence to pin the man in flesh and blood. Sharada is forced to concede that there is no solid evidence establishing the same.

The DYSP, the investigation officer, is frustrated that he cannot pin the person he has to any of the crimes committed with solid evidence. He sees a ray of hope when David Fernandes appears, claiming to be the guy's elder brother. As narrated by him, "Annamalai" is actually Joseph Fernandez, an intelligent student who, due to bad influences, takes the easy way out by becoming a fraud and trickster. "Annamalai" denies this too, as usual – "Naan Avan Illai." The DySP arranges a DNA cross match with David to establish that the guy is his sibling. However, his hopes are shattered when the DNA test returns a negative answer. It is soon revealed that it was Monika who tampered with the DNA cross match, ready to go to any crazy extend to save her guy from the clutches of the law.

Meanwhile, Sharada's own daughter Anjali is surprised at the developments as she too had been conned by the man, but only of some money, faking a painting by posing as an acclaimed artist Zakir Hussain. A law student herself, Anjali quite clearly sees through "Annamalai"'s schemes but is impressed by his brilliant performance in court, and like Monika, wishes him to be acquitted.

At the end of the hearing, Justice Sharada is inevitably forced to acquit "Annamalai" for lack of evidence, but the girls he cheated are waiting with drawn daggers for him. While he escapes all four of the present, another lady in a saree gets him in the heart. She reveals herself to the DySP as yet another woman who was cheated. The scene ends with Annamalai going down, making a cross with Jesus' name on his lips, but the film ends cutting short to the same person in a totally different appearance bluffing his way to a Caucasian girls in a foreign background.

== Cast ==
- Jeevan as Joseph Fernandez / Annamalai / Vignesh / Madhavan Menon / Zakir Hussein / Hariharan Das / Shyam Prasad
- Sneha as Anjali
- Namitha as Monika Prasad
- Malavika as Rekha Vignesh
- Jyothirmayi as Ammukutty Menon
- Keerti Chawla as Rani Das
- Lakshmi as Judge Saradha
- Hema Choudhary as Chandra Bhai
- Raj Kapoor as Chief Investigation Officer
- Livingston as David Fernandez
- Mayilsamy as Alex Thambidurai/Napoleon
- Mohan Raman as the public prosecutor
- Bala Singh as Minister Chelladurai
- O. A. K. Sundar as Thyagu
- Bayilvan Ranganathan
- P. R. Varalakshmi as Annamalai's foster mother
- Kousalya Senthamarai
- Sridhar as dancer in "Macha Kanni" song (cameo appearance)
- Tejashree as a victim of Joseph (uncredited appearance)

== Trivia ==
Lakshmi who played daugther of judge Poornam Vishwananthan in 1974 film of the same name, played judge herself in 2007 film with Sneha playing the judge's daugther role.

== Soundtrack ==
The soundtrack was composed by Vijay Antony. The song "Radha Kadhal" is the remake of the song "Radha Kadhal Varadha" from the original film.

Song	Artist(s)	Lyrics
"Kaakha Kaakha"	Vijay Antony, Charulatha Mani, Maya, Megha, Vinaya	Pa. Vijay
"Aen Enakku Mayakkam"	Jayadev, Sangeetha Rajeshwaran, Megha, Ramya, Sheepa	Pa. Vijay
"Macha Kanni"	Vijay Antony, Jayarajagopalam, Sathya Lakshmi	Pa. Vijay
"Nee Kavidhai"	Krish, Megha	Pa. Vijay
"Radha Kadhal"	V. V. Prasanna, Maya, Sangeetha Rajeshwaran, Vinaya	Kannadasan
"Then Kudicha"	Naresh Iyer, Deepa Miriam	Palani Bharathi

== Release and reception ==
The film was released on 20 April 2007. Sify called it "technically far superior" to the 1974 film, "but the modern remake lacks the bite of the original .Still it is worth a look, for its racy narration". Lajjavathi of Kalki praised the acting of Jeevan, Vijay Antony's music, Prabhakar's dialogues and praising the director for narrating flashback of every girl interestingly and concluded calling it a warning bell for girls who get cheated by men. KLT of The Hindu wrote, "This V. Hitesh Jhabak production has a lot going for it — fast-paced narrative, slick editing, apt casting and a plot that eschews candyfloss formula. Inspired by K. Balachander's 1970s original, the remake is a high gloss product".
