= Jugnuma: The Fable =

- Theatrical release poster
- Directed by: Raam Reddy
- Written by: Raam Reddy
- Produced by: Pratap Reddy; Sunmin Park; Guneet Monga; Anurag Kashyap; Ganesh Shetty
- Starring: Manoj Bajpayee; Priyanka Bose; Tillotama Shome; Deepak Dobriyal
- Cinematography: Sunil Borkar
- Edited by: Siddharth Kapoor; Raam Reddy
- Production companies: Prspctvs Productions; Maxmedia; Sikhya Entertainment; Flip Films
- Distributed by: Cinépolis
- Release dates: 16 February 2024 (Berlinale); 12 September 2025 (India)
- Running time: 118 minutes
- Countries: India; United States
- Languages: Hindi; English
- Box office: ₹0.40 crore

Jugnuma: The Fable is a 2024 drama film directed by Raam Reddy, starring Manoj Bajpayee, Deepak Dobriyal, Priyanka Bose, Hiral Sidhu, Awan Pookot and Tillotama Shome. The film has been produced by Prspctvs Productions, co-produced by Maxmedia and Sikhya Entertainment, and distributed by Flip Films. The film is presented by Guneet Monga and Anurag Kashyap.

The film made history by becoming the first Indian film to win Best Film at the 38th Leeds International Film Festival in the United Kingdom, and also won the Special Jury Award at the MAMI Mumbai Film Festival 2024. It had its world premiere at the 74th Berlin International Film Festival on February 16, 2024, in the prestigious Encounters segment—marking only the second Indian film in the last 30 years to compete in a key competitive section of the Berlinale.

The film was shot during the COVID-19 pandemic; principal photography was done on 16 mm film on location at Abbot Mount, a British-era hill station, 8 km from Lohaghat in Uttarakhand, where the main house in the film was located. The film released theatrically in India on 12 September 2025.

== Plot ==
Set in the spring of 1989, the story follows Dev and his family living in a colonial mansion atop a Himalayan cliff. Their peaceful life on a vast fruit orchard estate is disrupted when Dev discovers mysteriously burnt trees. As more trees are destroyed, tensions rise. Suspicion falls on passing nomads while a corrupt sheriff complicates the investigation. Despite Dev's desperate efforts to control the situation, more fires erupt until the dark, silent night finally begins to yield answers.

== Cast ==
- Manoj Bajpayee as Dev
- Hiral Sidhu as Vanya, Dev's daughter
- Priyanka Bose as Nandini, Dev's wife
- Tillotama Shome as Radha
- Awan Pookot as Juju, Dev's son
- Deepak Dobriyal as Dev's manager
- Gurpal Singh

== Release ==
The film had its world premiere at the 74th Berlin International Film Festival on February 16, 2024, where it competed in the Encounters segment. It is notable as only the second Indian film in the past 30 years to feature in one of the Berlin Film Festival's key competitive sections.

The film will release theatrically on 12 September 2025.

Year	Country	Festival	Category	Award
2025	USA	New York Indian Film Festival		
2025	USA	Indian Film Festival of L.A		
2025	India	Cinévesture International Film Festival		
2024	Germany	74th Berlin International Film Festival	Encounters	
2024	India	MAMI Mumbai Film Festival 2024	South Asia Competition	Special Jury Award
2024	India	International Film Festival of Kerala	Kaleidoscope	
2024	Spain	SEMINCI film festival		
2024	The United Kingdom	Leeds International Film Festival	Feature Film Competition	Winner
2024	France	Festival des 3 Continents - Nantes		Nominated
2024	Singapore	Singapore International Film Festival		

== Reception ==
On the review aggregator website Rotten Tomatoes, 100% of 13 critics' reviews are positive, with an average rating of 7.2/10. Shubhra Gupta of The Indian Express gave 3.5 stars out of 5 and said that "Manoj Bajpayee-starrer is at it most piercing when it is gentle. It weaves in the prosaic, the quotidian, with quiet strokes of magical realism." Renuka Vyavahare of The Times of India rated it 4/5 stars and stated that "Raam Reddy’s fantasy-fuelled mystery is a tender love letter to the mountains and the unhurried life — the one we traded for ambition long ago." Anuj Kumar of The Hindu observed that "Perched somewhere between magic and realism, filmmaker Raam Reddy spins an evocative cautionary tale of ecological and social decay in his sophomore film ‘Jugnuma: The Fable’."

Rahul Desai of The Hollywood Reporter India commented that "Raam Reddy’s second feature is a myth-busting triumph of beauty and curiosity." Deepa Gahlot of Rediff.com gave 3 stars out of 5 and said that "Jugnuma has the unhurried pace of a stroll at dusk through the hills and the quiet delight in coming across jugnus (fireflies) twinkling in the trees." Vineeta Kumar of India Today rated it 3/5 stars and writes that "'Jugnuma: The Fable', a slow-burn mystery that ties magic, realism, and metaphor. It lingers long after viewing, but its meditative pace may not appeal to everyone."

Lachmi Deb Roy of Firstpost rated it 3.5/5 stars and said that "The movie makes you understand that what truly belongs to you, comes back to you and nature has a way of saying that in the most harshest possible way. Jugnuma makes us believe that is time to celebrate independent cinema." Rishabh Suri of Hindustan Times rated it 3/5 stars and said that "Overall, Jugnuma shows that a fable is not just about magic but about the truths hidden within the everyday. It leaves you with questions, images, and a mood that lingers far longer than the runtime." Nandini Ramnath of Scroll.in observed that "The use of an analogue-era shooting medium combined with the vintage-y colourisation give the film a lush, tactile quality rarely seen in Indian films. At least in its compositions, if not always in its encounters between confused humans, Jugnuma achieves the expectations set up by the mysterious man and his magnificent wings in the opening scene."

Radhika Sharma of NDTV rated it 3/5 stars and said that "Jugnuma blends reality and reverie with the most gorgeous visuals of the mountains, clouds, trees, and streams, with fireflies or jugnu in Hindi as a leitmotif." Devesh Sharma of Filmfare rated it 4/5 stars and said that "Beyond its aesthetic and technical achievements, the film explores deeper themes. It critiques the colonial hangover of the landed gentry, suggesting that generational wealth often remains disconnected from India’s fabric. Classism is so ingrained they’re unaware of it. It advocates for returning forests to local communities, who are better suited to nurture them. Themes of conservatism and environmental exploitation intertwine with mountain mysticism, crafting a slow-burning, evocative tale."

Kabir Singh Bhandari of The Free Press Journal rated it 3/5 stars and said that "Overall, the movie has a calming effect, and that can be said both in terms not only of its content, but also of its promotions- it has won several international prestigious awards and at the same time it doesn’t involve some overly muscled idiot walking in slow motion expecting us to clap that they have arrived." Nonika Singh of The Tribune gave it 3.5 stars out of 5 and said that "Though the film moves languidly, there is a sense of urgency, a premonition that engulfs you just as fires would." Sahir Avik D’souza of The Quint rated it 3/5 stars and stated that "In its gentle epiphanies & faith in the fanciful stories of childhood, M. Night Shyamalan would be proud of Jugnuma." Debanjan Dhar of Outlook rated it 3.5/5 stars and writes that "A fabulously imaginative film, The Fable lulls and unnerves, rambling through storytelling, legacy and memories with a gentle, whimsical and dark spirit."
