= Kadhalikka Neramillai (TV series) =

- Genre: Soap opera
- Directed by: Raja
- Starring: Chandra Lakshman; Prajin; Srinath
- Theme music composer: C. K. Ganesh (Background Score)
- Opening theme: "Ennai Thedi Kadhal"; Sangeetha Rajeshwaran (Vocal); Thenmozhi Das (Lyrics)
- Composer: Vijay Antony (Title Song)
- Country of origin: India
- Original language: Tamil
- No. of seasons: 1
- No. of episodes: 155

Production
- Camera setup: Multi-camera
- Running time: approx. 20-22 minutes per episode

Original release
- Network: STAR Vijay
- Release: 26 November 2007 – 21 August 2008

Kadhalikka Neramillai (transl. No Time to Love) is a 2007 Indian Tamil-language drama television series starring Chandra Lakshman, Prajin and Srinath directed by Raja. It aired from 26 November 2007 to 21 August 2008 on STAR Vijay This serial has been re-telecasted on STAR Vijay Super from 6 January 2017.

== Synopsis ==
The story revolves around two professionals Shakthi and Divya, their life and their love.

== Cast ==
- Chandra Lakshman as Divya
- Prajin as Sakthi (Sakthivel)
- Srinath as Sri
- Attakathi Dinesh as Santhanam
- Aadukalam Naren as Chandru (Divya's father)
- O. A. K. Sundar as Murugavel (Sakthi's father)

== Soundtrack ==
The title track of the series was composed by Vijay Antony with lyrics by Thenmozhi Das and sung by Sangeetha Rajeshwaran. The song was well reached among audience.

Kadhalikka Neramillai

Soundtrack album
- Released: 2007
- Recorded: 2007
- Genre: TV serial soundtrack
- Language: Tamil

Track list
No.	Title	Music	Singer(s)	Length
1.	"Ennai Thedi Kadhal"	Vijay Antony	Sangeetha Rajeshwaran	4:46
