= Ganesh Shetty =

Ganesh Shetty is an Indian filmmaker and producer based in Mumbai. Born in Belvai near Moodbidri, he left for Mumbai at the age of 16 in the mid-nineties.His films has won several awards and has been screened at festivals including International Film Festival of India. He has produced several Bollywood movies and has collaborated with several companies in making their advertisements. He was the co-producer of The Fable which had it premiere at Berlin Film Festival in 2024.

== Filmography ==
=== Director ===
- Bete (2018)
- Paroksh

=== Producer ===
- Ek Hasina Thi - 2004 (Line Producer)
- Budhia Singh - 2016 Born to Run (Executive Producer)
- Newton - 2017 (Executive Producer)
- Jamtara - 2020 (Executive Producer)
- Madyantara - 2023 (Producer)
- Good Bad Ugly - 2025 (Line producer)
- They Call Him OG - 2025 (Line producer)
- The Fable - 2024 (Executive Producer)
- Sarkar - 2025 (Line Producer)
- Gram Chikitsalay - 2025 (Executive Producer)
