= To Mee Navhech =

- Written by: Acharya Atre
- Produced by: Natyasampada
- Starring: Prabhakar Panshikar
- Release date: 1962
- Country: India
- Language: Marathi

To Mee Navhech (transl. That's not me) is a classic Marathi-language play written by Acharya Atre based on the court case of Madhav Kazi, who was an active criminal during the years between 1955 and 1960. Though the protagonist role has been played by many actors since its inception in 1962, the role of Lakhoba Lokhande played by Prabhakar Panshikar is the most memorable. To Mee Navhech is probably the first play in the world where the same actor has to do five completely different roles, not to merely add to novelty value or as a stunt, but because the story demands it. To Mee Navhech was also among the first Marathi plays to make use of the Revolving Stage between two scenes. This is also translated in many regional languages. The play has crossed over 3000 shows in total over a span of 52 years which itself is a record.

== Background ==
A conman Lakhoba Lokhande is being prosecuted in the court of law for allegedly duping people, marrying women for money and essentially living multiple lives. He tries to defend his own self by asking uncomfortable questions to each witness during the cross-questioning. The entire play is set in a courtroom scene with a revolving set used for cut scenes and flashbacks.

== Storyline ==
The storyline focuses on a conman Lakhoba Lokhande, who claims he is a tobacco merchant from Nipani. The drama starts with a courtroom scene in which Lakhoba Lokhande is sitting in the defendant's box. He has been accused by the prosecution of swindling different persons through disguise and fraud. The prosecution lawyer presents many witnesses, most of whom are the victims of Lakhoba's embezzlement (and in some cases torture). The witnesses narrate their experiences with the defendant through flashbacks. Lakhoba argues his own case after firing his lawyer. He cross-examines the witnesses and during the process pleads his innocence by saying "To Mee Navhech".

== Plot ==
The play starts with a courtroom scene where the public prosecutor examines a witness in embezzlement case of a fraud who claims that he is a tobacco merchant Lakhoba Lokhande from Napani village.

The first witness is Sayyed Mansoor, who claims that Lakhoba Lokhande is actually his brother Hyder who vanished from his home 12 years ago & has a wife Sultana & a kid. He tells the court that 10 years back he had submitted a bail bond of Rs. 20,000 for a case involving fraud, wherein Hyder posed as a secretary to the PM, to a simpleton clerk & took Rs. 15,000 on the pretext of securing him a plum job in the secretariat. Hyder broke the bond & ran away, forcing his brother to sell his home & other personal belongings to pay the bond money he had borrowed from a money lender. Lakhoba decides to cross-examine the witnesses himself instead of a lawyer. He shows the first witness his pierced ears, which is a Hindu ritual hence he cannot be his brother as Muslims don't follow this ritual. Lakhoba ends his cross-examination with his classic dialogue "To Mee Navhech" (I am not that person) which he repeats after completing cross-examination of each witness. He consistently holds his line of argument of mistaken identity.

Next witness is the moneylender who had lent the money for the bail bond. The money lender is a family friend of Hyder's family & identifies Lakhoba as Hyder. Lakhoba in his cross-examination brings up a lot of hidden facts like police case of fraud against him & his son & claims that he is lying in the court under duress. As usual, he ends his argument with "To Mee Navhech"

Next witness is Agnihotri who was earlier defrauded in Delhi for Rs. 15,000 as a bribe for a plum job. Lakhoba in his cross-examination first puts the witness under pressure that he had attempted to bribe a govt official which is also a crime. In the fear the witness goes back and forth in his statement, in the end, he gets entangled in the argument if he has committed a crime by bribing a govt official, who in reality was a fraud.

Next witness is Sunanda Datar who identifies Lakhoba as Divakar Datar. Sunanda narrates that she first met Divakar at a marriage bureau where he posed as a sophisticated, London educated high ranking bureaucrat at Bangalore. He speaks in a British accentuated English, giving the impression that he is a very important official. He accepts the marriage proposal of Sunanda & demands dowry of Rs. 10,000 which her brother pays. The marriage is hurriedly arranged in a couple of days time by Divakar & for that reason attended by only 10-15 close relatives of Sunanda & none from Divakar's side. Later he takes her to Bangalore & they stay in a cheap hotel, he usually stays away from her on the pretext of important official work. He tells her that her brother Capt Ashok Paranjpe lives in Mangalore & he often meets him. She tells him that she is pregnant & Divakar blatantly refuses her claim saying that someone else is the father of her child.

She somehow locates the hotel room where Capt. Ashok Paranjpe is staying. She meets his wife Pramila Paranjape & narrates her side of the story, which doesn't match with his wife's story. Sunanda gets paranoid & at the same time, Capt Ashok Paranjpe appears who is in fact Divakar in disguised form & shaken to see Sunanda there. Sunanda demands to meet Divakar right now or she would go to the police, Capt Ashok somehow composes himself & gets out on the pretext of getting Divakar & returns as Divakar. Meanwhile, a police officer comes with an arrest warrant for Capt. Paranjape for fraud, Divakar dismisses him with his demeanour of high ranking official & fake ID. He disappears on the pretext of resolving the warrant. On cross-examination of Sunanda, he asks her how come she marry a person in within 2 days of meeting him for the first time, without verifying anything ending with 'To mee navmesh'.

Next witness is Pramila. On her cross-examination, she is not able to produce single evidence. Basically Ashok Paranjape had anticipated this situation & made sure there isn't single evidence like letters, photos or the priest. Next witness is Chandra Chitre, who is a widow. She is a caretaker of a local temple. Hyder arrives disguised as an ascetic by the name Radhesham Maharaj. He stays there for 6 months & wins the confidence of all the villagers. He takes her young daughter Venu to Sajjangad on the pretext of divine call & disappears (assuming he killed Venu for the jewellery).

Next witness is Inspector Dev, who had arrested him from Nagpur. He diligently produces all the evidence of his earlier disguise. Lakhoba again toes his line of mistaken identity by insisting on the point that the inspector had not seen his face before arresting him. Lakhoba produces his wife as last witness, who identifies him as Lakhoba & gives a timeline of his marriage & disappearance from home on the pretext of business which matches with the timeline of his misdemeanours. Later Lakhoba is not able to produce any evidence that he is Lakhoba or a resident of Nippani. After climatic closing arguments, the judge gives his judgement against him since his negative argument of mistaken argument is not backed by any concrete evidence.

As police his takes him away, his elder brother pleads him to ask forgives to the lord & see his wife & mother. Lakhoba disrespects him & his god, an infuriated Sayyed stabs him to death.

== Cast ==
Character	description
Lakhoba Lokhande	A tobacco merchant from Nipani
Divakar Ganesh Datar	A secret political officer of the Kingdom of Mysore
Dajishastri Datar	Elder brother of Divakar Datar
Captain Ashok Paranjpe	A Navy officer and younger brother of Divakar Datar
Radheshyam Maharaj	A saint

=== Lead role played by ===
1. Prabhakar Panshikar
2. Sumeet Raghavan
3. Girish Oak
4. Sanjay Mone
5. Pushkar Shrotri

=== Other roles played by ===
1. Dattopant Angre
2. Nanda Patkar
3. Chadrachud Vasudev
4. Bipin Talpade
5. Vasudev Date
6. Eran Joseph
7. Purushottam Bal
8. Kusum Kulkarni
9. Saroj Naik
10. Mandakini Bhadbhade
11. Bholaram Athavale
12. Shripad Joshi

== Tone of Narrative ==
The general tone of the narrative of "To Mee Navhech" means is rather sarcastic. Playwright Atre wanted the name "Mee To Navhech" but then Director Mo Ga Ranganekar went ahead with "To Mee Navhech" leaving Atre furious. The book is also published by same name. In that book, Atre wrote that Ranganekar did not suggest the name. Atre had already decided the name because the protagonist in the play used it many times "To Mi Navhech". The 1st show of this play was done on 8th Oct. 1962 in Delhi

== Remakes ==
- Naan Avanillai (1974) [Tamil] with Gemini Ganesan
- Woh Main Nahin (1974) [Hindi] with Navin Nischol
- Naan Avanillai (2007) [Tamil] with Jeevan
- Budhivanta (2008) [Kannada] with Upendra
