= Naan Avanillai (1974 film) =

1974 film by K. Balachander

- Theatrical release poster
- Directed by: K. Balachander
- Screenplay by: K. Balachandar
- Based on: To Mee Navhech by Pralhad Keshav Atre
- Produced by: Gemini Ganesan
- Starring: Gemini Ganesan; Lakshmi; Jayasudha; Jayabharathi; P. R. Varalakshmi
- Cinematography: B. S. Lokanath
- Edited by: N. R. Kittu
- Music by: M. S. Viswanathan
- Production company: Shri Narayani Films
- Release date: 7 June 1974
- Running time: 162 minutes
- Country: India
- Language: Tamil

Naan Avanillai (transl. I am not him) is a 1974 Indian Tamil-language film starring Gemini Ganesan. Produced by Ganesan himself, it was written and directed by K. Balachander. The film is based on the 1962 Marathi play To Mee Navhech, written by Pralhad Keshav Atre. It follows a man who woos and marries several women while he takes on as many different identities.

Naan Avanillai was released on 7 June 1974 to critical acclaim and commercial success. Ganesan won the Filmfare Award for Best Actor – Tamil. It was later remade into a 2007 Tamil film with the same title and a 2008 Kannada film titled Buddhivantha.

== Plot ==
Gemini Ganesan portrays a modern-day Don Juan who woos and marries several women while he takes on as many different identities. He is ultimately taken to court, but no-one is able to deduce his true identity as he speaks several languages with great facility. In jail, the police inspector slaps him, believing he would utter something in his mother tongue when taken by surprise and this Indian exclaims in Chinese! In the final scene a man who maintains that the hero or villain is his brother Fernandez stabs him. Our Don Juan makes a sign of the cross before he dies.

== Cast ==
- Gemini Ganesan as David Ashirvadham / 'Nanjil' Nambi / 'Kancheepuram' Aachari / Akbar Ali / Lakshmanan Sharma / Sahadeva Shastri / Hariharadas Swamigal / Jack Solomon / Shathurukanan Menon
- Lakshmi as Salima
- Poornam Viswanathan as Judge
- Senthamarai as Public Prosecutor
- Jayabharathi as Ammukutty
- P. R. Varalakshmi as Vijayasri
- Jayasudha as Rani
- Gandhimathi as Thaanambal
- Thengai Srinivasan as Thambi Durai / Johnny Walker
- Rajasulochana as Violet Kingsley
- M. N. Rajam as Thenmozhi
- Leelavathi as Chandrabai
- Typist Gopu as Advocate Arunachalam
- Oru Viral Krishna Rao as Police Inspector Rao
- Kathadi Ramamurthy as The court observer

Guest appearance

- Kamal Haasan as Appu
- S. A. Ashokan as Albert Ashirvadham

== Production ==
Naan Avanillai was adapted from the 1962 Marathi play To Mee Navhech, written by Pralhad Keshav Atre. K. Balachander directed the film adaptation with Gemini Ganesan as the male lead. Ganesan also produced the film under his then newly inaugurated Shri Narayani Films, this being his only production.

== Soundtrack ==
The music was composed by M. S. Viswanathan. The song "Radha Kaadhal" was recreated in the film's 2007 remake.

Song	Singers	Lyrics	Length
"Engirundho Vandhaal"	S. P. Balasubrahmanyam	Kannadasan	03:46
"Radha Kadhal Varadha"	S. P. Balasubrahmanyam	Kannadasan	06:17
"Manthaara Malare"	P. Jayachandran, L. R. Eswari	Kannadasan, P. Bhaskaran (Malayalam lyric)	04:43
"Naan Chinna Chiru"	P. Susheela, P. B. Sreenivas	Kannadasan, Kumara Mithra (Hindi lyrics)	03:20
"Inge Naan"	L. R. Eswari, Saibaba	Kannadasan	05:37

== Release and reception ==
Naan Avanillai was released on 7 June 1974. The film was dubbed Telugu-language as Srungara Leela and released on 17 December 1976. Naan Avanillai was commercially successful. The film and Ganesan's performance received critical acclaim. For his performance, Ganesan won the Filmfare Award for Best Tamil Actor. Kanthan of Kalki praised the cast performances and cinematography. Ganesan's daughter Rekha, despite her strained relationship with her father, praised his performance, saying, "You've acted well, daddy."

== Legacy ==
Naan Avanillai attained cult status in Tamil cinema for its witty dialogues, the screenplay and the "complete change of image" for Ganesan. Writing for Business Standard in 2011, Suveen K. Sinha called Naan Avanillai "arguably the most memorable film of his career". On Ganesan's centenary in 2020, The Hindu rated his performance in Naan Avanillai as one of his best.

== Remakes ==
Naan Avanillai was remade in the same language under the same title in 2007. A Kannada remake, Buddhivantha, was released in 2008.

== Bibliography ==
- Ganesh, Narayani (2011). Eternal Romantic: My Father, Gemini Ganesan. Roli Books. ISBN 978-8174365781.
