= Shirish Atre-Pai =

Social worker and writer from Maharashtra, India (1929–2017)

Shirish Pai (15 November 1929 – 2 September 2017) was a social worker and a writer from Maharashtra, India. She had written in Marathi and English, primarily the former.

== Early life ==
Shirish was the elder daughter of Acharya Atre. She had a college degree in Law from Government College of Law, Mumbai.

== Career ==
She joined her father's newspaper, Maratha, as a journalist. She was deeply influenced by the Soviet thinking and way of life, and toured the Soviet Union and other Eastern Bloc countries. Alongside her father, Shirish played a role in the Samyukta Maharashtra movement.

== Writing ==
She wrote several books, including collections of her poems. She introduced the haiku form of poetry to Marathi literature in 1975. She has also translated Japanese haiku into Marathi and English.

In a newspaper interview in June 2011 she revealed that she had started writing and composing poems from the time she was in secondary school and received great encouragement from her father in this regard.

== Family ==
Shirish was married to lawyer and journalist Vyankatesh Pai. They have two sons, Rajendra Pai and Vikramaditya Pai who are both lawyers. She resided, and died, in Mumbai.
