= Otru =

2021 film

- Theatrical release poster
- Directed by: Mathivanan Sakthivel
- Written by: Mathivanan Sakthivel
- Produced by: Sakthi Screens
- Starring: Mathivanan Sakthivel; Mahashri; Indira
- Cinematography: R. Dinesh
- Edited by: Suresh Urs
- Music by: S. P. Venkatesh
- Release dates: July 2021 (Tagore Film Festival); 8 July 2022
- Running time: 113 minutes
- Country: India
- Language: Tamil

Otru is a 2021 Indian Tamil drama thriller film written and directed by Mathivanan Sakthivel. The film features music composed by S. P. Venkatesh, and editing by Suresh Urs.

== Plot ==
The hero, Indran (Mathivanan Sakthivel) is a writer who meets a blind girl, Pramila (Mahashri). Indran uses the issues that Pramila have as a plot for his novel. In this journey he explores some thrilling events.

== Cast ==
- Mathivanan Sakthivel as Indran
- Mahashri as Pramila
- Indira as Bavitha
- Mahalakshmi as Mala
- Uma as Sujima
- Vany as Ratnam
- Siva Arasakumar as Vasi
- Dilip as Ajay
- Karunakaran as Prabhu
- Dinesh Raveendran as Senthil
- P. Panchadcharam as Sekhar
- R. Sivasubramanian as Sekhar
- Manimaran as Sekhar's son
- Prakalya Kugananthan as Baby Dharshini
- Mandas Ramesh Jesudas as Lawyer
- Marion Fernandez as Sister Julie
- Deepan Sugumaran as Inspector Maran
- Manu Joseph as Constable
- Surya Kaivaram as Doctor
- Suganty Palanisamy as Doctor
- Naresh Kumar as Psychiatrist
- Sefath as Teacher
- Christopher Manu as Young Indran
- Jayashri as Young Pramila

== Production ==
The film is produced by Sakthi Screens and it is written and directed by Mathivanan Sakthivel.

== Reception ==
CinemaInbox appreciated Mathivanan Sakthivel's and Mahashri's performance in the movie. It reviewed that Mathivanan Sakthivel was very natural in his acting as a novel writer and Mahashri performed the strong character as a blind girl very easily portraying as a real blind girl. The movie has lots of suspense in the search for unanswered thoughts and questions, tempting the audience to expect what comes next in the movie. The main drawbacks of the movie relates to the fact there were lots of new casts in the movie and the story revolving around similar locations.

Tamil2day News commented that a nice story has been filmed with a very small budget. Mathivanan Sakthivel's acting was extraordinary, especially his acting on sad scenes are exemplary. Mahashri's acting does not show that this is her first movie, she has acted as an experienced actress.

In her review Malini Mannath, said that the director has given a thriller like knot with couple of twists and turns. The knot has potential to be a better thriller, however the screen play has failed with too many issues pushed in the script. Mathivanan Sakthivel looks suitable for his role as a writer and Mahashri has done a fairly competent job as the blind girl. Mathivanan should be appreciated for not turning Mahashri's character as a stereotype.

== Accolades ==
Date	Film Festival	Category	Result	Reference
Mar 2022	Cult Critic Movie Awards	Best Actress, Best Films on Disability Issues	Won	
Jan 2022	Blue Hill International Film Festival	Best Feature Film	Official Selection	
Dec 2021	Tamil Nadu International Film Festival	Best Director, Best Feature Film	Won	
Nov 2021	Calcutta International Cult Film Festival	Best Director, Best Film on Women	Won	
Oct 2021	Museum Talkies International Film Festival	Best Director, Best Actor	Won	
Oct 2021	Cambodia Independent Film Festival	Best International Feature Film, Best Director, Best Women's Film	Won	
Sep 2021	Uruvatti International Film Festival	Best Actor	Won	
Aug–Sep 2021	Virgin Spring Cinefest	Family/Children Films	Won Outstanding Achievement Award	
Sep 2021	Aasha International Film Festival	Best Feature Film	Won	
Sep 2021	Golden Sparrow International Film Festival	Best Feature Film & Best Actor	Won	
Sep 2021	Aasha International Film Festival	Best Feature Film	Won	
Aug 2021	World Film Carnival	Best Director	Won	
Aug 2021	Noble International Film Festival	Feature Film	Official Selection	
Aug 2021	Indo French International Film Festival	Best Family Feature Film	Won	
Aug 2021	Mumbai Indie Film Festival	Feature Film	Official Selection	
July 2021	Tagore International Film Festival	Best Director, Best Script & Best Editing	Won	

== Other-language version ==
OTRU was dubbed as Jasoos (which means spy/ detective) in Hindi. The Hindi version of the movie was released February 2023 .
