= Otrai Panai Maram =

Tamil-language drama film

- Theatrical release poster
- Directed by: Puthiyavan Rasaiyah
- Produced by: S. Thanigaivel
- Starring: Puthiyavan Rasaiyah; Navayuga Kugaraja; Ajathika Puthiyavan
- Cinematography: Mahinda Abesinche; C J Rajkumar
- Edited by: Suresh Urs
- Music by: Ashwamithra
- Production company: Rsss Pictures
- Release dates: August 2018 (United Kingdom); 5 October 2024 (India)
- Countries: United Kingdom; India
- Language: Tamil

Otrai Panai Maram (transl. The lone palm tree) is a 2018 Tamil-language drama film directed by Puthiyavan Rasaiyah and starring himself, Navaayugha, and Ajathika Puthiyavan.

== Cast ==
- Puthiyavan Rasaiyah as Sundaram
- Navayuga Kugaraja as Kasturi
- Ajathika Puthiyavan

== Release ==
Seeman opposed the film's release citing that it showed the Eelam struggle in a poor light.

== Reception ==
Abhinav Subramanian of The Times of India rated the film 2.5/5 and wrote, "Ottrai illustrates the aftermath of Sri Lanka’s brutal civil war and how abuse came from all directions - not just ethnic lines. The execution is a bit lacking, even though the ideas were interesting". A critic from News Today wrote, "In all, Otrai Panai Maram stands as a sincere, heartfelt portrayal of the human cost of conflict and resilience in the face of overwhelming odds".

== Accolades ==
Award (Note: Awards, festivals and organizations are in alphabetical order.)	Date of ceremony (Note: Date is linked to the article about the awards held that year, wherever possible.)	Category	Recipient(s)	Result	Ref.
Top Indie Film Awards	2018	Best Original Idea	Otrai Panai Maram	Won	
Top Indie Film Awards	2018	Best Writing	—	Nominated	
Top Indie Film Awards	2018	Best Music	Ashwamithra	Nominated	
Top Indie Film Awards	2018	Best Feature	Otrai Panai Maram	Nominated	
Nevada International Film Festival	2018	Silver Screen Award	Otrai Panai Maram	Won	
Hollywood Guild Awards	2018	—	Otrai Panai Maram	Won	
