= Peth, Dahanu =

Village in Maharashtra

Peth
- village
- Location in Maharashtra, India Peth (India)
- Coordinates: 19.8664453°N 72.8958535°E
- Country: India
- State: Maharashtra
- District: Palghar
- Taluka: Dahanu
- Elevation: 34 m (112 ft)

Population (2011)
  - Total: 734
- Time zone: UTC+5:30 (IST)
- 2011 census code: 551713

Peth is a village in the Palghar district of Maharashtra, India. It is located in the Dahanu taluka.

== Demographics ==
According to the 2011 census of India, Peth has 160 households. The effective literacy rate (i.e. the literacy rate of population excluding children aged 6 and below) is 63.62%.

Demographics (2011 Census)
| | Total | Male | Female |
|---|---|---|---|
| Population | 734 | 375 | 359 |
| Children aged below 6 years | 110 | 57 | 53 |
| Scheduled caste | 13 | 6 | 7 |
| Scheduled tribe | 436 | 213 | 223 |
| Literates | 397 | 245 | 152 |
| Workers (all) | 446 | 225 | 221 |
| Main workers (total) | 433 | 217 | 216 |
| Main workers: Cultivators | 358 | 182 | 176 |
| Main workers: Agricultural labourers | 24 | 11 | 13 |
| Main workers: Household industry workers | 0 | 0 | 0 |
| Main workers: Other | 51 | 24 | 27 |
| Marginal workers (total) | 13 | 8 | 5 |
| Marginal workers: Cultivators | 4 | 2 | 2 |
| Marginal workers: Agricultural labourers | 5 | 4 | 1 |
| Marginal workers: Household industry workers | 2 | 0 | 2 |
| Marginal workers: Others | 2 | 2 | 0 |
| Non-workers | 288 | 150 | 138 |
