= Maha Maha =

2015 Indian film by Mathivanan Sakthivel

- Release poster
- Directed by: Mathivanan Sakthivel
- Written by: Mathivanan Sakthivel
- Screenplay by: Mathivanan Sakthivel
- Produced by: Sakthi Screens
- Starring: Mathivanan Sakthivel; Melissa
- Edited by: Suresh Urs
- Music by: Pavalar Shiva
- Release date: 6 March 2015
- Running time: 109 minutes
- Country: India
- Language: Tamil

Maha Maha (English: Great Great) is a 2015 Indian Tamil romantic thriller film written and directed by Mathivanan Sakthivel. The film stars Mathivanan Sakthivel and Melissa in the lead roles, while Indira, Nizhalgal Ravi, Anupama Kumar and Meera Krishnan play supporting roles. The film features music composed by Pavalar Shiva, and editing by Suresh Urs.

The film was predominantly filmed in Australia with a local Australian cast. The film released on 6 March 2015 in Tamil Nadu, Australia and England.

== Cast ==
- Mathivanan Sakthivel as Vijay Sankaran
- Melissa as Emily Anderson
- Indira as Anushri
- Nizhalgal Ravi as Dr. Mohan
- Anupama Kumar as Aunty
- Meera Krishnan
- Charmili as Sujatha
- Danny Elayoubi as John Watson
- Marion Fernandez as Dr. Maya Charles
- Sasitharan Sakthivel as Avi
- Charlotte Wood as Emily's mother
- Nick Gottum as Emily's father

== Production ==
The film is produced by Sakthi Screens and it was written and directed by Mathivanan Sakthivel. Mathivanan did a short course in film making at the Australian Film Base in Sydney before production of this film. The film was predominantly filmed in Australia in a small country town Taralga.

== Music ==
The film has three tracks composed by Pavalar Shiva, who is Ilayaraja's brother's (Pavalar Varadarajan's) son.

The audio was released by Ilayaraja.

Track list
No.	Title	Singer(s)	Length
1.	"Ennavo"	Prashanthini, Nivas K. Prasanna	5:31
2.	"Agaramodu"	Prashanthini, Valla	5:04
3.	"Maha Maha Theme"	Pavalar Shiva	2:19
Total length:			12:54

The Hindu reported that there are only three tracks in the album, all of which are pleasing to the ears. "Ennavo Pannuthe" is sung by Nivas K. Prasanna and Prashanthini, while "Agaramodu Lagaram" is sung by Prashanthini, Priya and Vallavan. Pavalar Siva's rendition of the title number "Maha Maha" is good.

== Critical reception ==
Kungumam review said that the movie does not have much commercial element, however the director has done a fast pace screenplay for which he needs to be congratulated.

Maalai Malar review reported that Mathivanan has done what is required for his role and Melissa has fulfilled the job that is given to her. The review also praised the director for using the Australian actors properly. The review highlighted that the screen play is bit slow for a crime thriller.
