= Phanaswadi =

Village in Maharashtra

- village
- Location in Maharashtra, India Phanaswadi (India)
- Coordinates: 19.9628636°N 73.0124856°E
- Country: India
- State: Maharashtra
- District: Palghar
- Taluka: Dahanu
- Elevation: 86 m (282 ft)

Population (2011)
  - Total: 1,032
- Time zone: UTC+5:30 (IST)
- ISO 3166 code: IN-MH
- 2011 census code: 551664

Phanaswadi is a village in the Palghar district of Maharashtra, India. It is located in the Dahanu taluka.

== Demographics ==
According to the 2011 census of India, Phanaswadi has 227 households. The effective literacy rate (i.e. the literacy rate of population excluding children aged 6 and below) is 46.16%.

Demographics (2011 Census)
	Total	Male	Female
Population	1032	500	532
Children aged below 6 years	185	93	92
Scheduled caste	2	1	1
Scheduled tribe	1007	490	517
Literates	391	243	148
Workers (all)	449	274	175
Main workers (total)	374	249	125
Main workers: Cultivators	206	122	84
Main workers: Agricultural labourers	57	35	22
Main workers: Household industry workers	1	1	0
Main workers: Other	110	91	19
Marginal workers (total)	75	25	50
Marginal workers: Cultivators	0	0	0
Marginal workers: Agricultural labourers	24	11	13
Marginal workers: Household industry workers	0	0	0
Marginal workers: Others	51	14	37
Non-workers	583	226	357
