= Sangeetha Rajeshwaran =

- Born: Chennai, Tamil Nadu, India
- Genres: Various
- Occupation: Singer
- Years active: 2005–present

Sangeetha Rajeshwaran is a playback singer known for her work in Tamil cinema. She also sung the remakes of her Tamil songs for Kannada and Telugu cinema apart from working in Malayalam cinema.

She was a frequent collaborator with Vijay Antony and had also worked with Karthik Raja and Dhina.

== Career ==
She participated in the Zee Tamil Sa Re Ga Ma Pa 2009 Challenge singing competition, where she reached the semi-finals.

Her most popular songs in Tamil have been composed by music director Vijay Antony, whom she met through a friend. She worked with him since his debut film Sukran. Songs produced under their combination include "Dailamo Dailamo" (Dishyum), "Yen Enakku Mayakkam" (Naan Avanillai), "Karikalan" (Vettaikaaran), "Mayam Seidhayo" (Velayudham) and "Ichu Ichu" (Vedi). Sangeetha has also sung the title song "Ennai Thedi Kadhal" of the serial Kadhalikka Neramillai which aired in Vijay TV, another composition by Vijay Antony.

== Discography ==
Year	Film	Song	Music director	Co-singer(s)	Language	Notes
2005	Sukran	"Saathikadi" I	Vijay Antony	Vijay Antony	Tamil	
2005	Sukran	"Saathikadi" II	Vijay Antony	Vijay Antony, Uma Mahesh	Tamil	
2005	Sukran	"Un Paarvai"	Vijay Antony	Vijay Antony	Tamil	
2005	Ben Johnson	"Pettayaadi"	Deepak Dev	Nadirsha	Malayalam	
2006	Dishyum	"Dailamo Dailamo"	Vijay Antony	Tippu	Tamil	
2006	Iruvar Mattum	"Unnai Paartha"	Vijay Antony	Solo	Tamil	
2007	Muruga	"Chinnanchiru Chitte"	Karthik Raja	Vineeth Srinivasan	Tamil	
2007	Naan Avan Illai	"Yen Enakku Mayakkam"	Vijay Antony	Jayadev, Megha, Ramya, Sheepa	Tamil	
2007	Naan Avan Illai	"Radha Kadhal"	Vijay Antony	V. V. Prasanna, Maya, Vinaya	Tamil	
2007	Ninaithaley	"Anandham Anandham"	Vijay Antony	Roopa, Vinaya	Tamil	
2007	Karuppusamy Kuththagaithaarar	"Sangam Vaithu"	Dhina	Dhina, Kavi, Karthik	Tamil	
2007	Maamadurai	"Koondukkal"	Karthik Raja	Karthik	Tamil	
2007	Oru Ponnu Oru Paiyan	"Nenjil"	Karthik Raja	Solo	Tamil	
2007–2008	Kadhalikka Neramillai	"Ennai Thedi Kadhal"	Vijay Antony	Solo	Tamil	
2008	Thotta	"Venum Venum"	Srikanth Deva	Jaidev	Tamil	
2008	Chakara Viyugam	"Neer Aadiduvoom"	Karthik Raja	Karthik, Snehan, Kanishka	Tamil	
2008	Buddhivantha	"Chitrana Chitrane"	Vijay Antony	Vijay Antony	Kannada	same tune as "Dailamo Dailamo"
2008	Buddhivantha	"Ra Ra Ra Raja"	Vijay Antony	Jeyadevan	Kannada	same tune as "Yen Enakku Mayakkam"
2008	Buddhivantha	"Harinanda"	Vijay Antony	Prasanna, Maaya	Kannada	same tune as "Radha Kadhai"
2008	Dindigul Sarathy	"Suttapazhama"	Dhina	Mysskin	Tamil	
2009	A Aa E Ee	"Kanni Vedi"	Vijay Antony	Vijay Antony	Tamil	
2009	A Aa E Ee	"Mena Minuki"	Vijay Antony	Vijay Antony, Suchitra, Surmukhi Raman	Tamil	
2009	TN 07 AL 4777	"Iphone"	Vijay Antony	Solo	Tamil	
2009	Mahatma	"Em Jarugutondi"	Vijay Antony	Karthik	Telugu	same tune as "Yen Enakku Mayakkam"
2009	Mahatma	"Dailamo"	Vijay Antony	Balaji, Megha	Telugu	same tune as "Dailamo Dailamo"
2009	Vettaikaaran	"Karikalan"	Vijay Antony	Suchith Suresan	Tamil	
2010	Kanagavel Kaaka	"Minsarame"	Vijay Antony	Mahesh Vinayagam	Tamil	
2010	Uthamaputhiran	"Idicha Pacharisi"	Vijay Antony	Ranjith, Vinaya	Tamil	
2011	Yuvan Yuvathi	"Ullangai"	Vijay Antony	Solo	Tamil	
2011	Velayudham	"Mayam Seidhayo"	Vijay Antony	Solo	Tamil	
2011	Vedi	"Ichu Ichu"	Vijay Antony	Vijay Antony	Tamil	
2012	Daruvu	"Nijam Cheppu"	Vijay Antony	Naresh Iyer	Telugu	same tune as "Karigalan"
2013	Iruvar Ullam	"Kannadi Silaye"	Vijay Antony	Santhosh Hariharan	Tamil	
2013	Kalyana Samayal Saadham	"Pallu Pona Raja" (Female)	Navin	Solo	Tamil	
2014	Mosakutty	"Kondamella Kondapottu"	Ramesh Vinayagam	Gunasekaran	Tamil	
2018	Kaali	"Yugam Noorai"	Vijay Antony	Vedala Hemachandra	Tamil	
