= Mann (2006 film) =

- Poster
- Directed by: R. Pudhiyavan
- Screenplay by: Raj Kajendra
- Story by: R. Pudhiyavan
- Produced by: Raj Kajendra
- Starring: Vijith; Shana Mahendran
- Cinematography: C. J. Rajkumar
- Edited by: Suresh Urs
- Music by: German Vijay
- Production company: Cine Range Films
- Release dates: 24 November 2006 (Sri Lanka); 1 December 2006 (Tamil Nadu, India)
- Countries: India; United Kingdom
- Language: Tamil
- Budget: Rs. 25,000,000

Mann (transl. Earth) is a 2006 Tamil-language drama film directed by R. Pudhiyavan and starring Vijith and Shana Mahendran.

== Plot ==
Due to civil unrest, Thankaiya and his family including his daughter Lakshmi and her fiancé Raja leave their village for another village. Raja is keen to get Lakshmi educated. However, Lakshmi falls in love with Ponrasa in school and becomes pregnant with their son. Ponrasa later rejects her and leaves to another country and a depressed Lakshmi passes away. After eighteen years, Ponrasa returns and how their son avenges their mother's death forms the rest of the story.

== Cast ==
- Shana Mahendran as Lakshmi
- Vijith as Ponrasa
- Vagai Chandrasekhar as Thankaiya
- S. Selvasegaran as Sinnathambi
- Kadhal Sukumar as Raja
- Dharsan as Gunaseelan
- Ratnajothi as Nallathambi
- Nimali as Ponnamma
- Maheswari Ratnam as Sivapakiyam
- Mithun as Thillai
- Chris as Ganesh
- Sornan as Jayam
- Thesara as Kethesse
- Pushpika as Suguna
- Udesthran as Chinrasa
- Janagan as Kajan
- Sri as Nakulan
- Vijayamighai as Eswari
- Thevar as Rasamanickam
- Master Jeeva as Sridharan
- Davidraj as Sivaraj
- K. Mohankumar as Sidamabrampillai
- Vani as Kannamma

== Production ==
The director Pudhiyavan Rasaiah, a lecturer at Kingston University, wanted to direct in his hometown of Kanakarayankulam, but did not get permission from the LTTE to shoot there. The entire film was shot in Udappuwa Tamil village in Puttalam, Sri Lanka with mostly Sri Lankan actors including Shana Mahendran from Batticaloa and Vijith apart from Indian actors Vagai Chandrasekhar and Kadhal Sukumar. Filming began in July 2005 and ended in August 2005.

== Soundtrack ==
The music was composed by German Vijay.

Track listing
No.	Title	Lyrics	Singer(s)	Length
1.	"Kadhal"	R. Pudhiyavan	Karthik	4:42
2.	"Kadhal Katre"	R. Pudhiyavan	Mathangi	4:59
3.	"Kezhvanam Suriyanai"	R. Pudhiyavan	P. Jayachandran	5:02
4.	"Landanukku Pogavillai"	R. Pudhiyavan	Tippu, R. Sathya, T. K. Kala	4:46
5.	"Silonu Payala Kelu"	Pa. Vijay	Dev Prakash, R. Sathya, T. K. Kala	4:44
Total length:				21:13

== Release and reception ==
The film had a limited release in Colombo and Batticaloa before being released in India. Malini Mannath of Chennai Online wrote that "The film takes us to an ambience of about two decades ago". A critic from Cinesouth wrote that "Director Pudhiyavan should be congratulated for his courage in making a film of this stature. Mann is fertile" while also praising the acting and cinematography and criticising the editing. Shana Mahendran won the best actress award at a Tamil film festival in Canada in 2006.
