= Charulatha Mani =

Indian playback and classical singer

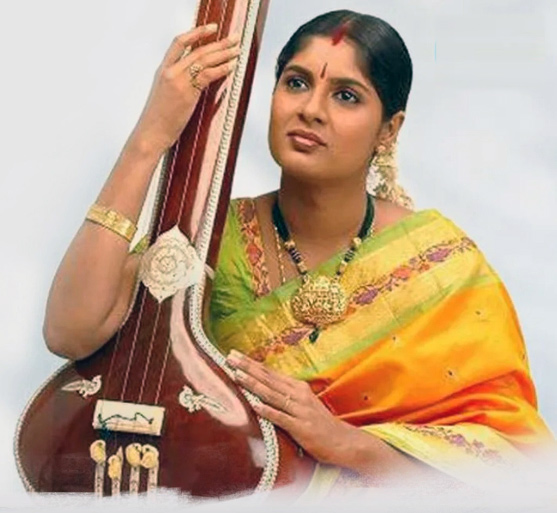
- Charulatha Mani

Background information
- Born: 20 January 1986 (age 40)
- Origin: Madras, Tamil Nadu, India
- Genres: Indian Classical Music and Playback singing
- Occupation: Singer
- Years active: 1999-present
- Labels: Giri Trading agency Pvt Ltd, Saregama, Moser Baer, Rajalakshmi Audio, Raaga.com, Sun Pictures, Carnatica etc.
- Website: Official website

Charulatha Mani (born 20 January 1986) is an Indian film playback singer and classical singer. She has been performing Carnatic concerts since 1999. She has sung chartbusters for Tamil, Telugu and Hindi movies. Charulatha has appeared in numerous TV shows and radio programmes in India and overseas. She has recorded music albums for major labels. Her Isai Payanam is a unique performance focused on Ragas in Carnatic and film music across indian languages and genres. Her YouTube channel has over 200K subscribers and features her Isai Payanam signature programs and songs. She received her PhD in 2019 from the prestigious Queensland Conservatorium Griffith University, Brisbane, Australia, on Hybridising carnatic Music and Early Italian Opera. She did her Postdoctoral Research Fellowship at the University of Queensland in lullaby songs of the world. Charu's music is known for its emotional connection to the listeners. She has been acclaimed for being genre-blending and highly creative. It is this ongoing interplay, of newness and the vintage, that has become the hallmark of her unique performance philosophy and signature recording style. This interesting interweave derives from her strong belief that singing must embrace innovation, inclusivity and diversity in contemporary society.

== Profile ==
Charulatha Mani is a Carnatic music vocalist and cine playback singer with a fan following in India and abroad. Gifted with a rich, melodious voice, and creativity she has a repertoire of compositions of various genres, making her a popular artist of today. She initially trained under her mother Smt Hemalatha Mani, Veena artiste, and later trained under vidwans Sri Sandhyavananam Srinivasa Rao, and Calcutta K. S. Krishnamurthy. She regularly performs all over the globe, and has won several awards including the Yuva Kala Bharati from Bharat Kalachar, the Isai Kurasil from New Delhi and M S Subbulakshmi Endowment Award from Narada Gana Sabha, Chennai, Best Ragam Tanam Pallavi award from Krishna Gana Sabha. She is also an engineer by education. She holds a bachelor's degree in mechanical engineering from College of Engineering Guindy, Anna University-Chennai. She gave up a promising career in engineering to pursue her passion in music.

Her Isai Payanam programmes have made her popular, and have also made her Isai Payanam home videos well known. In Isai Payanam she presents ragas in Classical and Film music with examples from Classical and Film genres exuding the melodic feel and the raga's innate beauty. Her raga segment presentations for Jaya TV started off the Isai Payanam trend which she later carried over to live performances. She holds a master's degree in music from the University of Madras. Charulatha Mani is also a prominent Cine Playback singer with several super-hits in many south Indian languages to her credit.

Her film super-hits include:

- "Anju vanna pooove" in Thug Life (2025 film) (A.R. Rahman, 2025)
- "Thanthai" in Nadigaiyar Thilagam and "Sada Nannu" in Mahanati (Mickey J Meyer, 2018)
- "Kannukkul Pothivaippen" in Thirumanam Ennum Nikkah (M Ghibran, 2013)
- "Titli" (Tamil lyrics) in Chennai Express (Vishal–Shekhar, 2013)
- "Theeye Theeye" from Suriya's Maattrraan (Harris Jayaraj, 2012)
- "Chillax" from Vijay's Velayudham (Vijay Antony, 2011)
- "En Uchi Mandaila" from Vijay's Vettaikaaran (Vijay Antony, 2009)
- "Kaakka Kaakka" from Naan Avan Illai (Vijay Antony, 2008)

She has also written on more than 80 ragas, their treatment in Carnatic and Indian Film Music, in her column "A Raga's journey" for The Hindu newspaper which is widely read and appreciated.

== Carnatic music ==
Charulatha Mani has performed in all major sabhas in Chennai and all over India. She has toured London, Canada, Australia, Singapore, the United States, Sri Lanka, and Europe.

She has been awarded the 'Woman Achievers Award' (2009), M.S. Subbulakshmi Endowment Award from Narada Gana Sabha (2008), Yuva Kala Bharathi from Bharat Kalachar in 2005, and Best Young Vocalist awards from Narada Gana Sabha (2003), Sri Parthasarathy Swami Sabha (2003), SAFE (2002), and Ragam Tanam Pallavi Award from Sri Krishna Gana Sabha (2002). Charulatha is the recipient of Scholarships from the Government of India and the Government of Tamil Nadu for performing and advanced learning of music.

Charulatha's music is frequently featured in radio broadcasts and television appearances. She has presented Isai Cafe on Raj TV, and Isai Payanam on Jaya TV, which presents ragas in Carnatic and Film music.

== Playback singing ==
Charulatha also pursues a career in Playback singing for films. Charulatha's film credits include Thug Life, Mahanati, Thirumanam Ennum Nikkah, Chennai Express, Maattrraan, Velayutham, Oru Koodai Mutham, Veluthu Kattu, Vettaikkaaran, Aaravadhu Vanam, Naan Avanillai, Budhivanta, Thanthiran, Kaadalan Kaadali, Nandhaa.

== Discography ==
- 2001 - Nandhaa, music director: Yuvan Shankar Raja, produced by Aparajeeth Films
- 2002 - Krishnam Vande Jagatgurum - Songs on Lord Krishna, Giri Trading Agency Pvt Ltd.
- 2003 - Mangalyam - Marriage Songs (Audio CD), Giri Trading Agency Pvt Ltd
- 2003 - Thirupaavai - Star dot Star
- 2004 - Bho Shambho - Songs on Lord Shiva (Audio CD), Giri Trading Agency Pvt Ltd
- 2004 - Melakartha Ragas - Listen & Learn (Audio CD), Giri Trading Agency Pvt Ltd
- 2004 - Nostalgia - Golden Classics of Yesteryears (VCD), Maximum Media
- 2005 - Madrasil Margazhi (Audio CD), Rajalakshmi Audio
- 2005 - Ganadarshini (VCD), Carnatica
- 2006 - Hiranmayim - Songs on Devi (Audio CD), Kosmic Music
- 2007-2009 - Isai Payanam - A Musical Journey with Charulatha Mani (DVD, Volumes 1–10), Giri Trading Agency Pvt Ltd.
- 2007 - Naan Avanillai, music director: Vijay Antony, produced by Japak Package Ltd.
- 2008 - Mooladhara Murthy - Tamil Kritis (DVD), Moser Baer
- 2008 - Manodharma (Audio CD), Saregama
- 2008 - Budhivanta, music director: Vijay Antony, produced by SV Rajendra Singh Babu
- 2009 - Thanthiran, music director: V.Thasi, produced by Vijayalakshmi Ramamoorthi
- 2009 - Kaadalan Kaadali, music director: Nandhan Raj, produced by Jai Balaji Moviemakers
- 2009 - Aaravadhu Vanam, music director: Haribabu, produced by Mpg Films International
- 2009 - Vettaikkaaran, music director: Vijay Antony, produced by Sun Pictures
- 2010 - Isai Payanam - Live in UK (MP3 CD), Rhythm Audio
- 2010 - Sankirtanam - Popular Telugu Kritis (Audio CD), Rhythm Audio
- 2010 - Veluthu Kattu, music director: Bharani, produced by S.A. Chandrasekaran
- 2010 - Oru Koodai Mutham, music director: Shanthan, produced by Nalla Charan Reddy, Junglee Music
- 2011 - Suttum Vizhi Sudare, music director: Aravind Sriram, produced by Hemalatha T., New Music
- 2011 - Pasakara Nanbargal, music director: Dhina, produced by G.M Balaji
- 2011 - Ayudha Porattam, music director: Nandhan Raj, produced by Jai Balaji Movie Makers
- 2011 - Velayutham, music director: Vijay Antony, produced by Aascar Films
- 2012 - Thalattu Padalgal - Lullabies (Audio CD), Super Audio
- 2012 - Maattrraan, music director: Harris Jayaraj, produced by AGS Entertainment
- 2012 - Chikki Mukki, music director: Gowtham, produced by Senthil Kumar
- 2013 - Chennai Express, music director: Vishal–Shekhar, produced by Red Chillies Entertainment
- 2013 - Kannukkul Pothivaippen in Thirumanam Ennum Nikkah, music director: M Ghibran, produced by Aascar Ravichandran
- 2018 - Thanthai in Nadigaiyar Thilagam and Sada Nannu in Mahanati, music director: Mickey J Meyer, Produced by Aswani Dutt, Priyanka Dutt and Swapna Dutt
- 2025 - Anju Vanna Poove in Thug Life (2025 film) (Tamil), "Achcha Vanne Poovvaa" (Telugu), music director: AR Rahman, producer: Rajkamal Films International
