= Dishoom (sound effect) =

Sound for punches used in Indian films

Dishoom was a sound effect that was used in Indian films for punches similar to Pow!

== Origins ==
In the early 1970s to the late 1990s, films were made on magnetic tape. The highest quality tape was reserved for the film's songs and the dialogues. To save on the expense of sound effects, the copy of the same sound effects were reused in various films. When used in succession, the sound effect was known as dishoom dishoom. Amitabh Bachchan was one of the first actors to use the sound effect in his action films. Dishkiyaaon was the sound of a gunshot used in Indian films.

== In popular culture ==
This is a list of some films that use dishoom:

- Don (1978)
- Hoshiyar (1985)
- Garv: Pride & Honour (2004)
- Om Shanti Om (2007)
- Ek: The Power of One (2009)
- Kambakkht Ishq (2009)
- Bal Hanuman 2 (2010)
- Khatta Meetha (2010)
- Chingari (2012)
- Boss (2013)
- Eternals (2021)
