= Madhyantara =

- Directed by: Dinesh Shenoy
- Written by: Dinesh Shenoy
- Produced by: Dinesh Shenoy, Ganesh Shetty
- Cinematography: Sunil Borkar
- Edited by: Suresh Urs
- Music by: Sidhant Mathur
- Release date: 2022
- Running time: 39 minutes
- Country: India
- Language: Kannada

2022 Kannada short film directed by Basti Dinesh Shenoy

Madhyantara is a 2022 Kannada-language film produced and directed by Dinesh Shenoy. The film was selected for the International Film Festival of India (IFFI), Goa. Cinematography was done by Sunil Borkar, edited by Suresh Urs and the music is composed by Sidhant Mathur. The film was shot on 16mm. The story is about the process of film-making with details that Shenoy observed over a period of time during his association with the movies.

Madhyantara won 2 awards at the 70th National Film Awards, presented by the National Film Development Corporation of India. While Dinesh Shenoy won the Best Debut Film of a Director award in the Non-Feature Films category, which includes a 'Golden Lotus Award (Swarna Kamal)' and a certificate, Suresh Urs won the Best Editing award in the same category, which includes a 'Silver Lotus Award (Rajat Kamal)' and a cash prize.

== Plot ==
Set in Karnataka during the 1970s, the film follows two boys from a small village whose love of cinema leads them from being film enthusiasts towards working in filmmaking. The story explores their aspirations and the people and experiences that shape their journey into the film industry.

== Development ==
The idea for Madhyantara developed during the COVID-19 lockdown, when Shenoy watched interviews with technicians and other people who had worked in the Kannada film industry during the 1970s and 1980s. Their recollections of films and their experiences inspired him to develop a fictional story about people working behind the scenes in cinema.

Although originally conceived as a feature film, the project was made first as a short film to demonstrate the concept to potential producers. Shenoy described it as the first act of a longer feature project, which he hoped to develop into a full-length film.

The film draws on the experiences recounted in the interviews Shenoy watched, as well as aspects of his own early life and struggles in the film industry. Although set in an earlier period, the story is fictional.
