= Budhwar Peth =

Human settlement in India

Budhwar Peth is a general term, in the Marathi language, for a locality in the Indian cities. These include cities like Pune, Solapur, Madhavnagar, Karad, Ahmednagar etc. The term Budhwar is derived from the day Wednesday in Marathi.

Many sexworkers live in the brothels of Budhwar Peth and face frequent rescue and raids from the police. In March 2026, a fact finding committee composed of the National Network of Sex Workers and other rights groups demanded an inquiry into the alleged police action against sex workers.
