= Romantic thriller =

Genre that involves romance and thriller

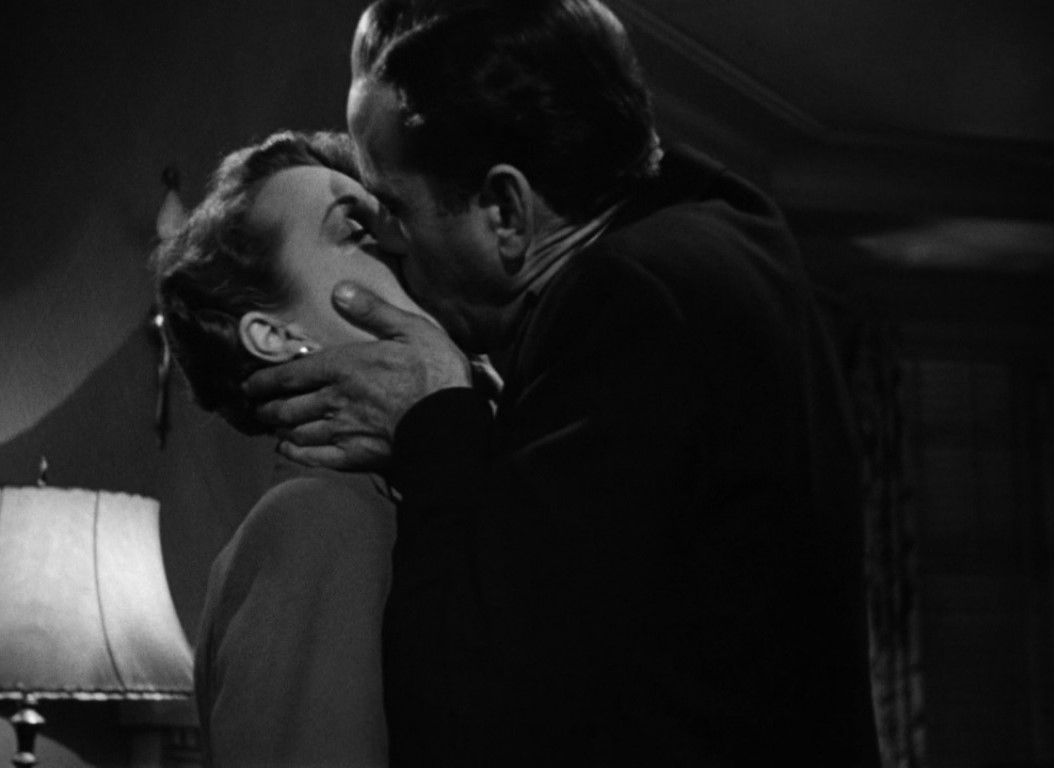
Frame from the 1941 trailer for romantic thriller film The Maltese Falcon showing Humphrey Bogart as Spade kissing Mary Astor as Brigid.

A romantic thriller is a narrative that combines elements of both the romance and thriller genres. The goal of romantic thrillers is to entertain audiences by evoking discomfort through moments of suspense along with heightened feelings of anxiety and fear. While the concept of a thriller is more widely recognized, it often transcends the boundaries of a single genre.

Thrillers can range from comedy and melodrama to adventure and romance, with all thrillers inherently blending different genres. The suspense that defines thrillers tends to pair more effectively with certain genres such as crime, sci-fi and romance, which allow for greater suspense than genres like screwball comedies or musicals.

A romantic thriller merges the romance and thriller genres, setting it apart from established cinema movements such as Gothic horror or Golden Age detective films. The genre operates on two levels: a specific theme is established, and general relationships, patterns and structural elements are woven into this theme. This framework allows for a wide variety of visual styles and story structures within the romantic thriller genre.

== History ==
In Northrop Frye's Anatomy of Criticism (1957), he suggested four archetypal categories in literature: comedy, romance, tragedy, and irony or satire. In a romance, the protagonist is portrayed as only slightly superior to others, capable of remarkable actions in a world where the "ordinary laws of nature are slightly suspended."

A key element in a romantic plot is adventure, often involving a quest where the hero faces challenges or monsters. There is typically a sense of two worlds: the mundane reality and the mysterious unknown. The concept of a maze is frequently used in romantic thrillers, symbolizing a journey filled with blind spots, false turns, and hidden elements, making the path to the solution difficult to navigate.

In the 1935 film The 39 Steps, the protagonist Richard Hannay leaves a theatre with a mysterious and attractive woman, and they embark on a romantic adventure involving spies, double agents, and espionage. The author John Buchan, on whose novel the film was based, pioneered the spy thriller genre, blending romance and adventure within the emerging context of political conflict. In Alfred Hitchcock's adaptation, the possibility of romance between the mysterious woman and the decent gentleman was a minor consideration compared to the larger plot of intrigue.

The Big Sleep (1946), based on Raymond Chandler's first Philip Marlowe novel and starring Humphrey Bogart, Lauren Bacall and Martha Vickers, exemplifies two key elements of the romantic thriller: adventure and dual worlds. The protagonists are brought together in an effort to save Bacall's younger sister, played by Vickers. The main plot, centred on a sleuthing adventure, sees the characters navigating both together and separately. In a common theme of the genre, the characters come from different social classes, typically preventing them from mixing. Their romance appears hopeless, but as the adventure unfolds, their relationship navigates its own labyrinth of truth and deception, ultimately overcoming mistrust. The story revolves around a private detective, hired by a wealthy family, investigating a complex case involving murder and blackmail, all while possibly falling in love. Chandler's Marlowe is often described as a "knight in dark armor rescuing a lady."

Film adaptations of Chandler's novels varied, with different directors and producers highlighting certain traits of the character, much like the varied interpretations of James Bond. Whereas Marlowe engaged in quick, bantering exchanges filled with sexual tension, Bond relies on a more physical style of seduction.

The 2020s have seen a resurgence of romantic thrillers, especially through Netflix originals such as Lady Chatterley's Lover (2022) and Dark Desire (2020), and non-Netflix titles such as Tooth Pari: When Love Bites (2023) and Love Lies Bleeding (2024).

== Films ==
Opinions vary on which films belong to this category; the following is only a sampling. The first list is of Hollywood films, while the second is broader and includes international films.

- Casablanca (1942): World War II drama of complications and love; stars Humphrey Bogart, Ingrid Bergman and Claude Rains.
- The Maltese Falcon (1941): Detective story with a love affair; stars Humphrey Bogart, Mary Astor and Peter Lorre.
- The Big Sleep (1946): Detective story with a love affair; stars Humphrey Bogart, Lauren Bacall, John Ridgely and Martha Vickers.
- Vertigo (1958): Alfred Hitchcock's story of investigation and romance; stars James Stewart and Kim Novak.
- Charade (1963): Divorcee gets involved in a caper with multiple layers of masked identity; stars Cary Grant, Audrey Hepburn, Walter Matthau and James Coburn.
- Sleeping with the Enemy (1991): Abused wife fakes her death to escape a violent husband; stars Julia Roberts and Patrick Bergin.
- True Romance (1993): Written by Quentin Tarantino; stars Christian Slater, Val Kilmer and Patricia Arquette.
- Unfaithful (2002): Marriage to an unfaithful wife has fatal consequences; stars Richard Gere and Diane Lane.
- Mr. and Mrs. Smith (2005): Married couple are secret assassins; stars Angelina Jolie and Brad Pitt.
- The Tourist (2010): Spies rope an unsuspecting tourist into their global hunt for a thief; stars Angelina Jolie, Johnny Depp, Paul Bettany and Timothy Dalton.

Broader list of examples:

- Pudhiya Paravai (1964)
- The Tamarind Seed (1974)
- Eyes of Laura Mars (1978)
- Diva (1981)
- Breathless (1983)
- Romancing the Stone (1984)
- The Handmaid's Tale (1990)
- Baazigar (1993)
- Darr (1993)
- Dil Se.. (1998)
- Wicker Park (2004)
- Baober in Love (2004)
- Match Point (2005)
- Gangster: A Love Story (2006)
- Fanaa (2006)
- Azhagiya Tamil Magan (2007, Tamil)
- The Adjustment Bureau (2011)
- Super 8 (2011)
- Nidra (2012, Malayalam)
- Safe Haven (2013)
- Maha Maha (2015, Tamil)
- Road Games (2015)
- Gentleman (2016)
