= Pralhad Keshav Atre =

Indian writer and politician

Āchārya Pralhad Keshav Atre
- Born: 13 August 1898; Kodit, Purandar, Pune district, Maharashtra
- Died: 13 June 1969 (aged 70); Mumbai, Maharashtra, India
- Other name: Āchārya Atre
- Education: University of Pune; University of London
- Occupations: Writer, editor, politician, social activist, director
- Movement: Indian Independence Movement; Samyukta Maharashtra Movement
- Children: Shirish Atre-Pai, Meena Deshpande

Member of Maharashtra Legislative Assembly
- In office 1962–1967
- Preceded by: position established
- Succeeded by: Vaman Matkar
- Constituency: Dadar

Member of Samyukta Maharashtra Samiti
- In office 1959 -1960
- Succeeded by: position abolished

Signature
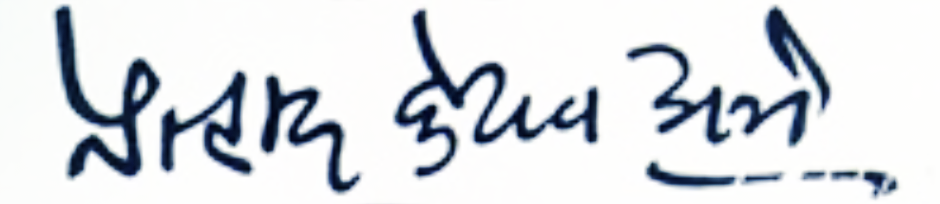

Pralhad Keshav Atre (13 August 1898 – 13 June 1969), popularly known as Āchārya Atre, was a Marathi writer, poet, educationist, founder–editor of Maratha (a Marathi language newspaper), and orator.

== Biography ==
=== Early life ===
Atre was born on 13 August 1898 in a Marathi Deshastha Rigvedi Brahmin family of Kodit Khurd, a village near Saswad in Pune district. His father was a clerk and also a secretary of Saswad Municipality for a brief period and his uncle was teacher at MES Waghire High School Saswad. He completed his primary and High School education from MES Waghire High School, Saswad. He matriculated from Fergusson college in 1919. He completed Bachelor of Arts from University of Pune. After graduation Atre took up a career as a school teacher. Atre did his T. D. (teacher's diploma) from the University of London in 1928. Before returning to India he studied Experimental Psychology under Cyril Burt and taught at Harrow.

== Film and theatre career ==
His Marathi film, Shyamchi Aai won the 1954 National Film Award for Best Feature Film. Atre wrote seven plays; some of them had a humorous theme while others, a serious one. All of them received high public acclaim. His comedy-play, Moruchi Mavshi was later adapted into Hindi film, Aunty No. 1 (1998), starring Govinda and Raveena Tandon. His movie Mahatma Phule (1955) received the President's Silver Medal.

== Writing and Publishing ==
Atre was the founder–editor of four Marathi newspapers. Two of them had a short life. But the other two, Maratha and (Weekly) Navayug, ran for many years with a large circulation. Below are some of his works.

Poetry collections: 1.Akrava Avtar (अकरावा अवतार) (1920) 2.Zenduchi Fule (झेंडूची फुले) (1925) 3.Geetganga (गीतगंगा) (1935) 4.Panchagavya (पंचगव्य) (1958)

Novels: 1.Maharashtra Mohra (महाराष्ट्र मोहरा) (1914) 2.Mohityancha Shaap (मोहित्यांचा शाप) (1921) 3.Changuna (चांगुणा) (1954)

Autobiographical works: 1.Mi Kasa Jhalo (मी कसा झालो) 2.Karheche Pani (कर्हेचे पाणी)

== Career ==
=== Political ===
- Member of Samyukta Maharashtra Samiti during 1956–60. He was arrested in 1956 under the Preventive Detention Act for his agitation.
- Member of Maharashtra Vidhan Sabha from Dadar constituency (18) 1962

=== Novels, Biographies, and Essays ===
- Gharābāher (1934)
- Bhramāchā Bhopalā (1935)
- Udyāchā Sansār (1936)
- Lagnāchi Bedi (1936)
- Moruchi Māwashi (1947) a Marathi comedy play
- To Mi Navhech (1962)
- Chāngunā (1954)
- Battāshi Wa Itar Kathā (1954)
- Mahātmā Jyotibā Phule (1958)
- Suryāsta (1964) (On the life of Jawaharlal Nehru)
- Samādhiwaril Ashru (1956)
- Kelyāne Deshātan (1961)
- Krantikarkanche kulpurush Savarkar (1983)
- Atre Uwāch (1937)
- Lalit Wāngmaya (1944)
- Hashā Āni Tālyā (1958)
- Dalitanche Baba (Remembering Dr. Ambedkar)
- Mi Kasā Jhālo (1953)

=== Movies ===
- Brahmachari (1938)
- Vasantsena (Marathi and Hindi 1942)
- Shyāmchi Aai (1953)
- Premveer (Script writer)
- Dharmveer (Script writer)
- Brandichi Bātali (Script writer)
- Paayaachi Daasi (Hindi: Charanon Ki Daasi). Producer.
- Mahātmā Phule (1954)
- Parinde (Hindi, Director under name of Principal Atre) (1945)

=== Journalism ===
- Founder/Editor of (weekly) Sāptāhik Navyug (1940–1962) and Tukārām (1954)
- Evening newspaper Jai Hind (1948)
- Daily Marāthā (1956 – Till the end)

== Honors ==
- President of 38th Natya Sammelan at Belgaon (1955)
- President of 10th Maharashatra Patrakar Sammelan (1950)
- President of Regional Sahitya Sammelan at Baroda, Indore and Gwalior
- In his honor there is an Acharya atre bhavan in Saswad

== Awards ==
National Film Awards (India)

- 1st National Film Awards (1953) – President's gold medal for the All India Best Feature Film – Shyamchi Aai
- 2nd National Film Awards (1954) – President's silver medal for Best Feature Film in Marathi – Mahatma Phule
