= List of awards and nominations received by Suriya =

Suriya awards and nominations
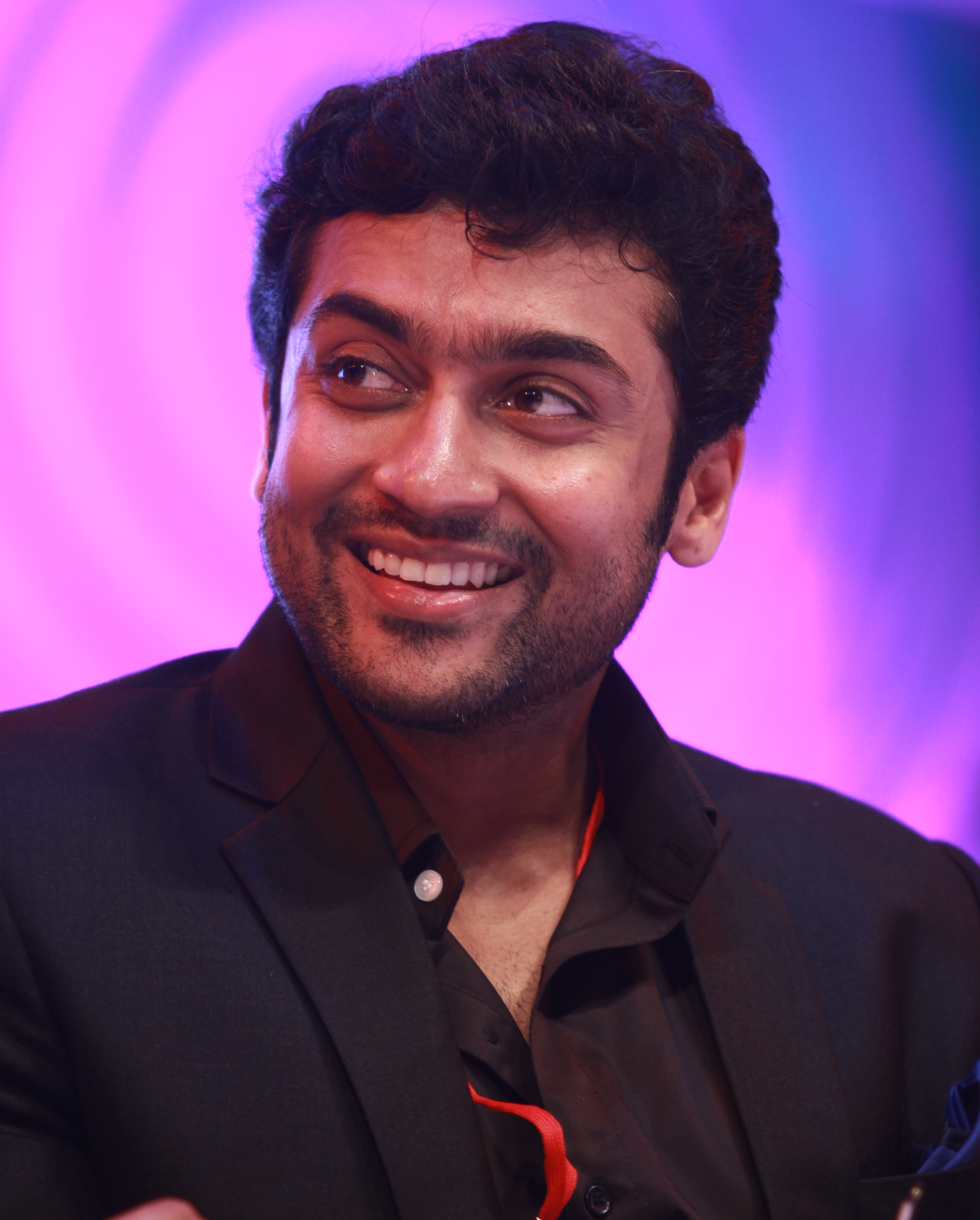
- Suriya at an event
Awards & nominations
Award	Won	Nom
National Film Awards	2	2
Filmfare Awards South	7	20
Tamil Nadu State Film Awards	10	10
South Indian International Movie Awards	2	6
Vijay Awards	5	14
Edison Awards	2	2
Dinakaran Awards	1	1
Cinema Express Awards	2	2
CineMAA Awards	1	1
International Tamil Film Awards	1	1
Kalaimamani Award	1	1
Screen Awards	0	1
Stardust Awards	0	1
AXN Action Awards	0	1
Zee Cine Awards Telugu	1	1
Chennai Times Film Awards	0	2
Others	16	21
- Total (Note: Certain award groups do not simply award one winner. They recognize several different recipients, have runners-up and have third place. Since this is a specific recognition and is different from losing an award, runner-up mentions are considered wins in this award tally. Awards in certain categories do not have prior nominations and only winners are announced by the jury. For simplification and to avoid errors, each award in this list has been presumed to have had a prior nomination.)
Totals	51	87
- References

Suriya is an Indian actor and film producer. He made his film debut in Nerrukku Ner (1997), which won him awards for the best debut that year at Cinema Express Awards and Dinakaran Awards. He won Tamil Nadu State Film Award for Best Actor in 2002 for the film Nandhaa, which was the major break in his career. He won his first Filmfare Award, for Best Supporting Actor for the film Pithamagan (2003). Suriya was nominated nineteen times and won seven Filmfare Awards South, including three for Best Actor. At Vijay Awards, he was nominated fourteen times and won five. In 2010, he was awarded as Best Welfare Provider by Vijay TV for his contribution through Agaram Foundation. He won his first National Film Award, for Best Actor, for Soorarai Pottru in 2022.

== National Film Awards ==
Year	Category	Film	Result	Ref.
2020	Best Actor	Soorarai Pottru	Won	
2020	Best Feature Film	Soorarai Pottru	Won	

== Filmfare Awards South ==
The Filmfare Awards South is the South Indian segment of the annual Filmfare Awards, presented by The Times Group to honour both artistic and technical excellence of professionals in the South Indian film industry. The awards are separately given for Kannada, Tamil, Telugu and Malayalam films.

Year	Film	Category	Result	Ref.
2002	Nandhaa	Best Actor – Tamil	Nominated	
2003	Mounam Pesiyadhe	Best Actor – Tamil	Nominated	
2004	Pithamagan	Best Supporting Actor – Tamil	Won	
2004	Kaakha Kaakha	Best Actor – Tamil	Nominated	
2005	Perazhagan	Best Actor – Tamil	Won	
2006	Ghajini	Best Actor – Tamil	Nominated	
2009	Vaaranam Aayiram	Best Actor – Tamil	Won	
2010	Ayan	Best Actor – Tamil	Nominated	
2011	Singam	Best Actor – Tamil	Nominated	
2012	7 Aum Arivu	Best Actor – Tamil	Nominated	
2013	Maattrraan	Best Actor – Tamil	Nominated	
2014	Singam 2	Best Actor – Tamil	Nominated	
2017	24	Best Actor – Tamil	Nominated	
2017	24	Critics Best Actor – Tamil	Won	
2022	Soorarai Pottru	Best Film	Nominated	
2022	Soorarai Pottru	Best Actor – Tamil	Won	
2022	Jai Bhim	Best Actor – Tamil	Nominated	
2022	Jai Bhim	Best Film – Tamil	Won	
2024	Meiyazhagan	Best Film – Tamil	Nominated	
2024	Meiyazhagan	Best Film – Critics'	Won	

== Tamil Nadu State Film Awards ==
The Tamil Nadu State Film Awards are the most notable film awards given for Tamil films in India. They are given annually to honour the best talents and provide encouragement and incentive to the South Indian film industry by the Government of Tamil Nadu.

Year	Film	Category	Result	Ref.
2001	Nandhaa	Best Actor	Won	
2005	Ghajini	Best Actor: Special Prize	Won	
2008	Vaaranam Aayiram	Best Actor: Special Prize	Won	
2015	Pasanga 2	Best Film: Second Prize	Won	
2015	36 Vayadhinile	Best Film About Women's Empowerment	Won	
2018	Kadaikutty Singam	Best Film: Second Prize	Won	
2019	Ponmagal Vandhal	Best Film About Women's Empowerment	Won	
2020	Soorarai Pottru	Best Actor	Won	
2020	Soorarai Pottru	Best Film: Second Prize	Won	
2021	Jai Bhim	Best Film	Won	

== Kalaimamani Awards ==
The Kalaimamani is an award in Tamil Nadu state, India. These awards are given by the Tamil Nadu Iyal Isai Nataka Manram (literature, music and theatre) for excellence in the field of art and literature.

Year	Film	Category	Result	Ref.
2005	Various films	Art and Literature	Won	

== Chennai Times Film Awards ==
The Chennai Times Film Awards presented by The Times of India to celebrates the best in the Tamil film industry.

Year	Film	Category	Result	Ref.
2012	7 Aum Arivu	Best Actor	Nominated	
2013	Maattrraan	Best Actor	Nominated	

== CineMAA Awards ==
The CineMAA Awards are presented annually by Movie Artists Association Group, a television network based in Hyderabad.

Year	Film	Category	Result	Ref.
2013	Maattrraan	Best Actor – Tamil	Won	

== Cinema Express Awards ==
The Cinema Express Awards are presented annually by Indian Express Group to honour artistic excellence of professionals in the south Indian film industry which comprises Tamil, Telugu, Kannada and Malayalam film industries.

Year	Award	Nominated work	Role	Result	Ref.
1997	Cinema Express Award for Best New Face Actor	Nerrukku Ner	Suriya	Won	
2002	Best Popular Tamil Actor in Lead Role	Nandhaa	Nandhaa	Won	

== Edison Awards ==
The Edison Awards have been presented by the Tamil television channel MyTamilMovie.com since 2009 to honour excellence in Tamil cinema.

Year	Film	Category	Result	Ref.
2017	24	Best Protagonist	Won	
2017	24	Best Antagonist	Won	

== International Tamil Film Awards ==
The International Tamil Film Awards (ITFA) is an award ceremony that honours artistic excellence in Tamil films. The awards were first presented in 2003.

Year	Film	Category	Result	Ref.
2004	Kaakha Kaakha	Best Actor	Won	

== Screen Awards ==
The Screen Awards are presented annually by Indian Express Limited to honour excellence in Hindi cinema.

Year	Film	Category	Result	Ref.
2011	Rakta Charitra 2	Best Male Debut	Nominated	

== South Indian International Movie Awards ==
The South Indian International Movie Awards are rewards the artistic and technical achievements of the South Indian film industry.

Year	Film	Category	Result	Ref.
2012	7 Aum Arivu	Best Actor – Tamil	Nominated	
2013	Maattrraan	Best Actor – Tamil	Nominated	
2014	Singam II	Best Actor – Tamil	Nominated	
2017	24	Best Actor – Tamil	Nominated	
2021	Soorarai Pottru	Best Actor – Tamil	Won	
2021	Soorarai Pottru	Best Film – Tamil	Won	

== Stardust Awards ==
The Stardust Awards, given by Stardust movie magazine began in 2003. They celebrate new talent in the movie industry as well as honouring current stars.

Year	Film	Category	Result	Ref.
2011	Rakta Charitra 2	Superstar of Tomorrow – Male	Nominated	

== Vijay Awards ==
The Vijay Awards have been presented by the Tamil television channel STAR Vijay since 2006 to honour excellence in Tamil cinema.

Year	Work	Category	Result	Ref.
2008	Various films	Icon of the Year	Won	
2009	Vaaranam Aayiram	Best Actor	Won	
2010	Ayan, Aadhavan	Entertainer of the Year	Won	
2010	Agaram Foundation	Best Welfare Provider	Won	
2011	Ratha Sarithiram	Best Actor	Nominated	
2011	Singam	Entertainer of the Year	Won	
2011	Singam	Favourite Hero	Nominated	
2012	7 Aum Arivu	Favourite Hero	Nominated	
2012	7 Aum Arivu	Best Actor	Nominated	
2013	Maattrraan	Best Actor	Nominated	
2013	Maattrraan	Favourite Hero	Nominated	
2014	Singam II	Favourite Hero	Nominated	
2015	Anjaan	Favourite Hero	Nominated	
2018	Singam 3	Favourite Hero	Nominated	

== Other awards and recognition ==
Year	Film	Award	Category	Result	Ref.
1998	Nerrukku Ner	Dinakaran Awards	Dinakaran Best New Face Actor	Won	
2008	Various films	South Scope Awards	Style Icon of the Year	Won	
2009	Vaaranam Aayiram	South Scope Awards	South Scope Award for Most Stylish Actor	Nominated	
2010	Ayan	South Scope Awards	South Scope Award for Best Actor	Nominated	
2010	Aadhavan, Ayan	Amrita Mathrubhumi Award	Best Actor – Tamil	Won	
2010	Aadhavan	Meera Isaiaruvi Tamil Music Award	Best Performance in a Song ("Damakku Damakku")	Won	
2011	Rakta Charitra 2	AXN Action Awards	Best Action Actor in a Negative Role	Nominated	
2016	36 Vayathinile	Behindwoods Gold Medal Awards	Behindwoods Best Debut Producer (2D Entertainment)	Won	
2017	24	Zee Cine Awards – Telugu	South Sensation of the Year	Won	
2017	24	Kollywood Cinemaaa Awards	Best Villain	Won	
2017	24	FilmiBeat Awards	Best Villain in Tamil	Won	
2020	Actor, Film producer (2D Entertainment), Agaram Foundation	Norway Tamil Film Festival Awards	NTFF 2020 Kalaichigaram Award	Won	
2021	Soorarai Pottru	Cinema At Its Best Awards	Best Actor	Won	
2021	Soorarai Pottru	Cinema At Its Best Awards	Best Feature Film	Nominated	
2021	Soorarai Pottru	Oxygen Play Awards	Regional Movie FTW (Producer)	Won	
2021	Soorarai Pottru	Oxygen Play Awards	Hit It Out of the Park (Male)	Nominated	
2021	Soorarai Pottru	Blacksheep Digital Awards	Best Film of the Year (Producer)	Won	
2021	Soorarai Pottru	Hit List OTT Awards	Best Film of the Year (Producer)	Won	
2021	Soorarai Pottru	Indian Film Festival of Melbourne	Best Actor	Won	
2021	Soorarai Pottru	Critics Choice Film Awards	Best Film	Nominated	
2021 – 22	Jai Bhim	Norway Tamil Film Festival Awards	Best Film	Won	
2021 – 22	Jai Bhim	Congressional Global Community Oscars	MEATF Congressional Medal of Excellence	Won	
2021 – 22	Jai Bhim	Cinema At Its Best Awards	Best Feature Film	Won	
2021 – 22	Jai Bhim	Noida International Film Festival 2022	Best Feature Film	Won	
