= 2nd Vijay Awards =

Indian film awards ceremony in 2008

The 2nd Vijay Awards ceremony, honoring the winners of the best of Tamil film industry in 2007, was held at Jawaharlal Nehru Indoor Stadium in Chennai on 3 May 2008.

== Winners ==
No	Category	Winner	Film
1	Favorite Hero	Rajinikanth	Sivaji
2	Favorite Heroine	Nayantara	Billa
3	Favorite Film	Pokkiri	Pokkiri
4	Favorite Director	Prabhu Deva	Pokkiri
5	Favourite Song		
6	Best Film	Paruthiveeran	Paruthiveeran
7	Best Director	Vetrimaaran	Polladhavan
8	Best Actor	Sathyaraj	Onbadhu Roobai Nottu
9	Best Actress	Priyamani	Paruthiveeran
10	Best Supporting Actor	Prakash Raj	Mozhi
11	Best Supporting Actress	Sujatha	Paruthiveeran
12	Best Comedian	Vadivelu	Marudhamalai
13	Best Villain	Kishore	Polladhavan
14	Best Debut Actor	Karthi	Paruthiveeran
15	Best Debut Actress	Anjali	Kattradhu Thamizh
16	Best Music Director	A. R. Rahman	Sivaji
17	Best Cinematographer	Velraj	Polladhavan
18	Best Editor	Sreekar Prasad	Kattradhu Thamizh
19	Best Art Director	Thota Tharani	Sivaji
20	Best Male Playback Singer	Krish (June Pona)	Unnale Unnale
21	Best Female Playback Singer	Neha Bhasin (Pesugiren)	Satham Podathey
22	Best Lyricist	Na Muthukumar (Ballelakka)	Sivaji
23	Best Story, Screenplay Writer	Viji	Mozhi
24	Best Choreographer	Dinesh (Vasantha Mullai)	Pokkiri
25	Best Stunt Director	Rambo Rajkumar	Polladhavan
26	Best Make Up Artistes		
27	Best Costume Designer		
28	Best Find of the Year	Venkat Prabhu	Chennai 600028
29	Best Crew	Chennai 600028 team	
30	Contribution to Tamil Cinema	'Film News' Anandan	
31	Chevalier Sivaji Ganesan Award for Excellence in Indian Cinema	Maniratnam	
32	Entertainer of the Year	Vijay	Pokkiri, Azhagiya Tamil Magan
33	Vijay Award for Icon of the year	Suriya	
34	Vijay Award for Face of the year	Silambarasan	
