= 5th Vijay Awards =

Tamil film industry awards ceremony

The 5th Vijay Awards ceremony honoring the winners and nominees of the best of Tamil film industry in 2010 was held on 25 June 2011 in Chennai.

== Award categories ==
For winners across 32 various categories like Best Film, Best Actor Male/Female, Best Supporting Actor Male/Female, Best Comedian, Best Villain, Best Playback Singer Male/Female, Best Debut Actor Male/Female, Best Choreographer, Best Film Editor, Best Lyricist, Best Art Director, Best Dress Designer, and Best Dialogue Writer awards were selected by the jury members.

== Jury members ==
The jury for the Fifth Annual Vijay Awards comprised the writer, director and producer Yugi Sethu, actress Radhika Sarathkumar, Karthik, director A. R. Murugadoss and cinematographer Ravi. K. Chandran.

== Award winners and nominees ==
Winners are highlighted and nominees are listed in the list below.

=== Jury awards ===
Best Film	Best Director
Angadi Theru - Ayngaran International; Mynaa - Shalom Studios; Thenmerku Paruvakaatru - Jotham Media Works; Nandalala - Ayngaran International; Madrasapattinam - AGS Entertainment	Vasanthabalan - Angadi Theru; A. L. Vijay - Madrasapattinam; Gautham Vasudev Menon - Vinnaithaandi Varuvaayaa; Prabu Solomon - Mynaa; Seenu Ramasamy - Thenmerku Paruvakaatru
Best Actor	Best Actress
Vikram - Raavanan; Arya - Madrasapattinam; Karthi - Naan Mahaan Alla; Silambarasan - Vinnaithaandi Varuvaayaa; Suriya - Ratha Charithram	Anjali - Angadi Theru; Reema Sen - Aayirathil Oruvan; Aishwarya Rai - Ravanan; Amala Paul - Mynaa; Trisha Krishnan - Vinnaithaandi Varuvaayaa
Best Supporting Actor	Best Supporting Actress
Thambi Ramaiah - Mynaa; Ganesh - Vinnaithaandi Varuvaayaa; Madhavan - Manmadan Ambu; Parthiban - Aayirathil Oruvan; Sampath Raj - Goa	Saranya Ponvannan - Thenmerku Paruvakaatru; Susan - Mynaa; Snigdha Akolkar - Nandalala; Abirami - Angadi Theru; Sangeetha - Manmadan Ambu
Best Comedian	Best Villain
Santhanam - Boss Engira Bhaskaran; Ganja Karuppu - Kalavani; M. S. Baskar & Chams - Irumbukkottai Murattu Singam; Vadivelu - Nagaram; Vivek - Singam	Rajinikanth - Enthiran; A. L. Azhagappan - Easan; A. Venkatesh - Angadi Theru; Prakash Raj - Singam; Vinod - Naan Mahaan Alla
Best Debut Actor	Best Debut Actress
Vidharth - Mynaa; Adharvaa - Baana Kaathadi; Arulnidhi - Vamsam; Mahesh - Angaadi Theru; Myshkin - Nandhalala	Amala Paul - Mynaa; Amy Jackson - Madrasapattinam; Samantha - Baana Kaathadi; Nandhagi - Aval Peyar Thamizharasi; Oviya - Kalavani
Best Music Director	Best Cinematographer
A. R. Rahman - Vinnaithaandi Varuvaayaa; D. Imman - Mynaa; G. V. Prakash Kumar - Madrasapattinam; Ilayaraaja - Nandalala; Rahnananthan - Thenmerku Paruvakaatru; Yuvan Shankar Raja - Paiyaa	R. Rathnavelu - Enthiran; Santhosh Sivan - Raavanan; Nirav Shah - Madrasapattinam; M. Sukumar - Mynaa; Richard M. Nathan - Angadi Theru
Best Editor	Best Art Director
Kasi Viswanathan - Naan Mahaan Alla; Anthony - Vinnaithaandi Varuvaayaa; LVK Dass - Mynaa; A. Sreekar Prasad - Angadi Theru; V. T. Vijayan - Singam	Selvakumar - Madrasapattinam; Muthuraj - Irumbukkottai Murattu Singam; Rajeevan - Naan Mahaan Alla; Sabu Cyril - Enthiran; T. Santhanam - Aayirathil Oruvan
Best Male Playback Singer	Best Female Playback Singer
Vijay Prakash - Vinnaithaandi Varuvaayaa; Karthik - Raavanan; Haricharan - Paiyaa; Roop Kumar Rathod - Madrasapattinam; Alphonse Joseph - Vinnaithaandi Varuvaayaa	Shreya Ghoshal - Vinnaithaandi Varuvaaya; Chinmayi - Endhiran; Shreya Ghoshal - Raavanan; Harini - Madarasapattinam; Andrea Jeremiah - Goa; Anuradha Sriram - Raavanan
Best Lyricist	Best Story, Screenplay Writer
Vairamuthu - Thenmerku Paruvakaatru; Gangai Amaran - Goa; Na. Muthukumar - Angadi Theru; Thamarai - Vinnaithaandi Varuvaayaa; Yugabharathi - Mynaa	Prabhu Solomon - Mynaa; Gautham Vasudev Menon - Vinnaithaandi Varuvaayaa; Sargunam - Kalavani; Suseenthiran and Bhaskar Sakthi- Naan Mahaan Alla; Vasanthabalan and Jayamohan - Angadi Theru
Best Choreographer	Best Stunt Director
Dinesh - Easan; Remo Fernandez - Enthiran; Kandaas - Angadi Theru; Raju Sundaram - Enthiran; Flexy Stu - Vinnaithaandi Varuvaayaa	Anal Arasu - Naan Mahaan Alla; Anal Arasu - Singam; Peter Hein - Enthiran; Kanal Kannan - Paiyaa; Rambo Rajkumar - Aayirathil Oruvan
Best Make Up	Best Costume Designer
Banu - Endhiran	Deepali Noor - Madrasapattinam; Erum Ali - Aayirathil Oruvan; Nalini Sriram - Vinnaithaandi Varuvaayaa; Manish Malhotra - Enthiran; Sai - Irumbukkottai Murattu Singam
Best Find of the Year	Best Crew
Remo D'Souza for Endhiran; Madhan Karky for Endhiran	Mynaa
Contribution to Tamil Cinema	Chevalier Sivaji Ganesan Award for Excellence in Indian Cinema
Sundaram Master	K. Balachander
Entertainer of the Year	Social Responsibility
Suriya - Singam	Raghava Lawrence

=== Favorite Awards ===
Favorite Hero	Favorite Heroine
Rajinikanth - Enthiran; Ajith Kumar - Aasal; Kamal Haasan - Manmadan Ambu; Suriya - Singam; Vijay - Sura	Trisha Krishnan - Vinnaithaandi Varuvaayaa; Aishwarya Rai - Enthiran; Anushka Shetty - Singam; Nayantara - Boss Engira Bhaskaran; Tamannaah Bhatia - Paiyaa
Favorite Film	Favorite Director
Endhiran - Sun Pictures; Singam - Studio Green; Vinnaithaandi Varuvaayaa - Escape Artists Motion Pictures; Aayirathil Oruvan - Dream Valley Corporation; Boss Engira Bhaskaran - Vasan Visual Ventures	S. Shankar - Enthiran; Gautham Vasudev Menon - Vinnaithaandi Varuvaayaa; Hari - Singam; Mani Ratnam - Raavanan; N. Linguswamy - Paiyaa
Favourite Song
En Kadhal Solla - Paiyaa - Yuvan Shankar Raja; Hosanna - Vinnaithaandi Varuvaaya; Kadhal Vandhale - Singam; Kilimanjaro - Endhiran; Un Mela Aasadhaan - Aayirathil Oruvan	
