= 3rd Vijay Awards =

Indian film awards ceremony in 2009

The 3rd Vijay Awards ceremony honouring the winners of the various categories of the Tamil film industry in India in 2008 was held at Jawaharlal Nehru Indoor Stadium on 13 June 2009. The 3rd Vijay Awards was sponsored by Univercell.

== Winners ==
No	Category	Winner	Film
1	Favorite Hero	Kamal Haasan	Dasavathaaram
2	Favorite Heroine	Nayantara	Yaaradi Nee Mohini
3	Favorite Film	Vaaranam Aayiram	
4	Favorite Director	Gautham Vasudev Menon	Vaaranam Aayiram
5	Favourite Song	Anjala	Vaaranam Aayiram
6	Best Film	Subramaniyapuram	Subramaniyapuram
7	Best Director	Sasikumar	Subramaniyapuram
8	Best Actor	Suriya	Vaaranam Aaiyram
9	Best Actress	Sneha	Pirivom Santhippom
10	Best Supporting Actor		
11	Best Supporting Actress	Simran	Vaaranam Aaiyram
12	Best Comedian	Kamal Haasan	Dasavathaaram
13	Best Villain	Kamal Haasan	Dasavathaaram
14	Best Debut Actor		
15	Best Debut Actress	Parvathy	Poo
16	Best Music Director	Harris Jayaraj	Vaaranam Aaiyram
17	Best Cinematographer	S.R.Kathir	Subramaniyapuram
18	Best Editor	Raja Mohammed	Subramaniyapuram
19	Best Art Director	Sameer Chanda, M. Prabhaharan, Thota Tharani	Dasavathaaram
20	Best Male Playback Singer	Hariharan (Nenjukkul Peithidium)	Vaaranam Aaiyram
21	Best Female Playback Singer	Bombay Jayashri (Yaaro Manathilae)	Dhaam Dhoom
22	Best Lyricist	Thamarai	Vaaranam Aaiyram
23	Best Story, Screenplay Writer	Kamal Haasan	Dasavathaaram
24	Best Choreographer		
25	Best Stunt Director	Rajasekhar	Subramaniyapuram
26	Best Make Up Artistes	Banu, Yogesh	Vaaranam Aaiyram
27	Best Costume Designer	Gautami	Dasavathaaram
28	Best Find of the Year	James Vasanthan	Subramaniyapuram
29	Best Crew	Subramaniapuram Team	Subramaniyapuram
30	Contribution to Tamil Cinema	Satyam Cinemas	
31	Chevalier Sivaji Ganesan Award for Excellence in Indian Cinema	A. R. Rahman	
32	Entertainer of the Year	Dhanush	Yaaradi Nee Mohini
