= 6th Vijay Awards =

2012 Tamil film awards ceremony

The 6th Vijay Awards ceremony honoring the best of Tamil film industry in 2011 was held on 16 June 2012 at the Jawaharlal Nehru Indoor Stadium in Chennai, India. The event was hosted by Gopinath and Sivakarthikeyan.

== Jury ==
The jury members were director K. S. Ravikumar, comedian Yugi Sethu, actresses Nadia Moidu, Lizy Priyadarshan and cinematographer R. Rathnavelu.

== Award winners and nominees ==
=== Jury awards ===
Best Film	Best Director
Engeyum Eppodhum; Aadukalam; Aaranya Kaandam; Azhagarsamiyin Kuthirai; Vaagai Sooda Vaa	Vetrimaaran - Aadukalam; A. Sarkunam - Vaagai Sooda Vaa; M. Saravanan - Engaeyum Eppothum; Santha Kumar - Mounaguru; Thiagarajan Kumararaja - Aaranya Kaandam
Best Actor	Best Actress
Vikram - Deiva Thirumagal; Dhanush - Aadukalam; Jiiva - Ko; Suriya - 7 Aum Arivu; Vishal - Avan Ivan	Anjali - Engaeyum Eppothum; Anushka Shetty - Deiva Thirumagal; Iniya - Vaagai Sooda Vaa; Nithya Menen - Nootrenbadhu; Richa Gangopadhyay - Mayakkam Enna
Best Supporting Actor	Best Supporting Actress
R. Sarathkumar - Kanchana; Ajmal Ameer - Ko; Appukutty - Azhagarsamiyin Kuthirai; G.M. Kumar - Avan Ivan; Somasundaram - Aaranya Kaandam	Uma Riyaz Khan - Mouna Guru; Ananya - Engeyum Eppodhum; Lakshmy Ramakrishnan - Yuddham Sei; Piaa Bajpai - Ko; Vasundhara - Poraali
Best Comedian	Best Villain
Santhanam - Siruthai; Kovai Sarala - Kanchana; Santhanam - Deiva Thirumagal; Vadivelu - Kaavalan; Vivek - Mappillai	Ajith Kumar - Mankatha; Johnny Tri Nguyen - 7 Aum Arivu; Jackie Shroff - Aaranya Kaandam; John Vijay - Mouna Guru; V. I. S. Jayabalan - Aadukalam
Best Debut Actor	Best Debut Actress
Nani - Veppam; Jeyanth - Margazhi 16; Krishna - Seedan; Shabarish - Markandeyan; Veera Bahu - Nadunisi Naaygal	Richa Gangopadhyay - Mayakkam Enna; Shruthi Haasan - 7 Aum Arivu; Iniya - Vaagai Sooda Vaa; Hansika Motwani - Mappillai; Taapsee Pannu - Aadukalam
Best Music Director	Best Cinematographer
G. V. Prakash Kumar - Aadukalam; C. Sathya - Engaeyum Eppothum; Harris Jayaraj - Engeyum Kadhal; Sharreth - Nootrenbadhu; M Ghibran - Vaagai Sooda Vaa	P. S. Vinod - Aaranya Kaandam; Om Prakash - Vaagai Sooda Vaa; Nirav Shah - Deiva Thirumagal; Ravi K. Chandran - 7 Aum Arivu; Velraj - Aadukalam
Best Editor	Best Art Director
Kishore Te. - Engeyum Eppodhum; Anthony - Ko; Praveen K. L. & N. B. Srikanth - Aaranya Kaandam; Raja Muhammed - Mounaguru; Gagin - Yuddham Sei	Seenu - Vaagai Sooda Vaa; Jackson- Aadukalam; Videsh - Aaranya Kaandam; Kathir - Payanam; Rajeevan - 7 Aum Arivu
Best Male Playback Singer	Best Female Playback Singer
Velmurugan - "Otha Sollale" (Aadukalam); Aalap Raju - "Enamo Aedho" (Ko); Haricharan - "Aariraro" (Deiva Thirumagal); Karthik - "Dhimu Dhimu" (Engeyum Kadhal); S. P. Balasubrahmanyam - "Ayyayo" (Aadukalam)	Chinmayi - "Sara Sara" (Vaagai Sooda Vaa); Prashanthini - "Ayyayo" (Aadukalam); Saindhavi - "Pirai Thedum" (Mayakkam Enna); Suzanne D'Mello - "Mazhai Varum" (Veppam); Shweta Mohan - "Nee Korinal" (180)
Best Lyricist	Best Story, Screenplay Writer
Vairamuthu - "Sara Sara" (Vaagai Sooda Vaa); Dhanush - "Voda Voda" (Mayakkam Enna); Madhan Karky - "Enamo Aedho" (Ko); Na. Muthukumar - "Aariro" (Deiva Thirumagal); Snehan - "Yathe Yathe" (Aadukalam)	Thiagarajan Kumararaja - Aaranya Kaandam; K. V. Anand and Subha - Ko; M. Saravanan - Engaeyum Eppothum; Raghava Lawrence - Kanchana; Vetrimaaran - Aadukalam
Best Background Score	Best Dialogue
Yuvan Shankar Raja - Aaranya Kaandam; M. Ghibran - Vaagai Sooda Vaa; G. V. Prakash Kumar - Deiva Thirumagal; K - Yuddham Sei; Harris Jayaraj - Ko	Samuthirakani - Poraali; Vetrimaaran - Aadukalam; Kullanari Koottam; Payanam; A. R. Murugadoss - 7 Aum Arivu
Best Choreographer	Best Stunt Director
K. Suchitra - Avan Ivan (Dia Dia Dole); - Engeyum Eppodhum (Maasama); Dinesh - Aadukalam (Otha Sollala); - Mayakkam Enna (Kaadhal Yen Kaadhal); - Engeyum Kadhal (Nangaai)	Dilip Subbarayan - Aaranya Kaandam; - Rowthiram; - 7 Aum Arivu; - Aadukalam; Silva - Mankatha
Best Make Up	Best Costume Designer
Gothandapani - 7 Aum Arivu; - Avan Ivan; - Aaranya Kaandam; - Vaagai Sooda Vaa; - Engeyum Eppodhum	Anuvardhan & Murthy - 7 Aum Arivu; - Engeyum Kadhal; - Ko; - Vaagai Sooda Vaa; Vasuki Bhaskar - Mankatha
Best Find of the Year	Best Crew
M. Ghibran for Vaagai Sooda Vaa	Aadukalam
Contribution to Tamil Cinema	Chevalier Sivaji Ganesan Award for Excellence in Indian Cinema
	S. P. Balasubrahmanyam
Entertainer of the Year	Special Jury Awards
Dhanush	Kovai Sarala - Kanchana (Best Female Comedian); Sara Arjun - Deiva Thirumagal (Best Child Actress)

=== Favorite Awards ===
Favorite Hero	Favorite Heroine
Ajith Kumar - Mankatha; Dhanush - Aadukalam; Suriya - 7 Aum Arivu; Vikram - Deiva Thirumagal; Vijay - Velayutham	Anushka Shetty - Deiva Thirumagal; Asin - Kaavalan; Hansika Motwani - Engeyum Kadhal; Taapsee Pannu - Aadukalam; Trisha Krishnan - Mankatha
Favorite Film	Favorite Director
Ko - R. S. Infotainment; Mankatha - Cloud Nine Movies; Siruthai - Studio Green; Velayutham - Aascar Films; 7 Aum Arivu - Red Giant Movies	Venkat Prabhu - Mankatha; A. R. Murugadoss - Ezham Arivu; K. V. Anand - Ko; Selvaraghavan - Mayakkam Enna; Vetrimaaran - Aadukalam
Favourite Song
"Enamo Aedho" - Ko; "Kadhal En Kadhal" - Mayakkam Enna; "Kalasala Kalasala" - Osthe; "Otha Sollala" - Aadukalam; "Vilaiyaadu Mankatha" - Mankatha	
