= Ayan (film) =

2009 film by K. V. Anand

- Theatrical release poster
- Directed by: K. V. Anand
- Written by: K. V. Anand; Subha
- Dialogues by: Subha
- Produced by: M. Saravanan; M. S. Guhan
- Starring: Suriya; Prabhu; Tamannaah Bhatia
- Cinematography: M. S. Prabhu
- Edited by: Anthony
- Music by: Harris Jayaraj
- Production company: AVM Productions
- Distributed by: Sun Pictures
- Release date: 3 April 2009
- Running time: 165 minutes
- Country: India
- Language: Tamil
- Budget: ₹15 crore
- Box office: ₹80 crore

Ayan (transl. Creator) is a 2009 Indian Tamil-language action thriller film directed by K. V. Anand and produced by M. Saravanan and M. S. Guhan. The film, starring Suriya, Prabhu, Tamannaah Bhatia, Akashdeep Saighal, Jagan, and Karunas. The film score and soundtrack were composed by Harris Jayaraj with editing by Anthony and cinematography by M. S. Prabhu. The film tells the story of a young man involved in smuggling who becomes a target of his rivals, leading to a major change in his life.

The film was launched in Chennai, while filming also took place in various locations out of India, including Namibia, Malaysia, Zanzibar and South Africa. It released on 3 April 2009 worldwide. Ayan was declared as the solo blockbuster of 2009 in Tamil cinema, collecting about ₹80 crore (equivalent to ₹220 crore or US$23 million in 2026) worldwide and became the highest grossing Tamil film of the year. The film was also successful in Kerala.

== Plot ==
Deva is a computer science post-graduate in Chennai who works with Dass by smuggling pre-release unlicensed films on DVD and other small contraband mainly through the air. Deva's widowed mother Kaveri does not appreciate his career choice. Their former business associate Nemichand Seth's son Kamalesh tries to foil their Diwali film piracy operations to take over that smuggling deal for himself through police-backed channels. After Kamalesh orchestrates a raid on their hideout, the inspector offers Dass that one of his men should take the blame for the crimes. Deva attempts to do so, but another man, Chitti Babu, who is not involved with the gang, takes responsibility. Later, Chitti joins Dass's group and befriends Deva while he completes his education. Chitti and Deva run a variety of smuggling jobs for Dass for months, often on international routes. Chitti learns about all the means and modes of operation.

Meanwhile, Deva accidentally meets Chitti's younger sister Yamuna, and they soon fall in love. Chitti is happy because Deva is well-educated. On Deva's birthday, he and Chitti smuggle gold bars worth $150 million from a tanker in Chennai port. When Dass learns of Deva's birthday, Dass gives him money and the day off to enjoy while the others trade the gold. Deva is called for temple worship by his mother, where trouble ensues when he learns that customs authorities have received a tip-off about the hideout amid a major smuggling operation. However, the others narrowly escaped with the goods. He finds out that Chitti has been working for Kamalesh all this time. Chitti goes on to work as a drug mule for Kamalesh, ingesting heroin capsules and transporting them to Malaysia. He meets Deva on the flight. While disembarking, Chitti falls ill, and Deva fends off Kamalesh's gang to help Chitti even though they are estranged. Chitti confesses that though he worked for Kamalesh, his friendship with Deva was genuine.

In a tragic turn of events, Kamalesh's gang kidnaps Chitti before Deva can save him, and they cut him up to recover the drugs. Deva fends off the thugs and tries to save Chitti. In his final moments, Chitti requests that Deva burn him so that his family never learns of his death. Deva burns Chitti's body along with the drugs and returns to India with Chitti's belongings. However, Kamalesh tips off the authorities about Chitti's death, and Yamuna herself files a case against Deva. However, Yamuna finds Chitti's phone, in which Chitti had recorded the circumstances of his death. Deva is released, and Yamuna reunites with him. Deva plans not to engage in the smuggling business for a while, but Kamalesh has his people plant drugs at the airport and blames Deva, who tips off the customs officer Parthiban. In turn, Deva informs Parthiban about the drug mules working for Kamalesh in exchange for his freedom. Deva works with Parthiban to monitor Kamalesh's calls with his clients, thus busting many illegal smuggling consignments.

Kamalesh eventually discovers the bug and tries to eliminate Deva and Parthiban. However, they both escape and secure a massive cocaine shipment from Kamalesh. Despite this, they trace the shipment to Kamalesh's accountant, who agrees to become a witness after Deva records Kamalesh making sexual advances towards Kavitha, the accountant's daughter, by secretly mixing Ketamine into her Pepsi. Kamalesh has the accountant killed before the court hearing and gets released due to lack of evidence. Kamalesh tries to kill Deva and his mother, but they have a narrow escape. He then plans a hit on Dass as he foresees Deva taking control of their diamond smuggling operation. Dass saves Deva but dies after his vehicle collides with a petroleum tanker. Deva heads to Congo, where he finishes Kamalesh and retrieves the diamonds. When Deva returns to India, Parthiban searches for him again, admitting that Deva's mother exposed him to get Deva out of his illegal activities. Deva surrenders the diamonds disguised under a wig, and Parthiban reveals that he can now enlist Deva to work as a customs official. Deva accepts the job and walks out with his mother and Yamuna.

== Cast ==
- Suriya as Devaraj Velusamy (Deva)
- Prabhu as Anthony Dass
- Tamannaah Bhatia as Yamuna (Voice dubbed by Chinmayi)
- Akashdeep Saighal as Kamalesh (Voice dubbed by Ajay Kapoor)
- Jagan as Chitti Babu
- Karunas as Dilli
- Ponvannan as J. Parthiban IRS
- Renuka as Kaveri Velusamy
- Delhi Ganesh as Narcotics Officer
- Subhalekha Sudhakar as Film Producer
- Janaki Sabesh as Kamalesh's aide
- Kalairani as Brothel Owner
- Meesai Rajendran as Sub-Inspector Muruganantham
- Bava Lakshmanan
- Boys Rajan
- Anjali Devi
- Sathish
- Seema

Cameo appearance

- Koena Mitra in the song "Honey Honey"
- Raghuvaran as Velusamy, Deva's father (Photo only)

== Production ==
=== Development ===
Three years after the release of his debut venture Kana Kandaen starring Srikanth and Gopika, cinematographer K. V. Anand expressed his desire to commence his second film as director. He and Subha discussed several plots and settled for "Ayan" because "it was not only different but had scope for entertainment". It was later announced that Anand would be directing his next film, produced under the AVM Production banner, titled Ayan. The film was inaugurated at AVM Studios on 24 March 2008 with the presence of most of the unit members. On the occasion, Anand announced the film's genre to be an action thriller interlaced with Romance and Comedy. He also suggested Ayan meant "outstanding", excellence" or can be the name for sun rays in five different languages. However, this was later doubted by a few critics, raising a point saying Ayan was not necessarily a Tamil language word. Despite the film's lyricist Vairamuthu's calls for the word to be a Tamil word, it was argued that Ayan was a nickname for the Hindu deity Lord Brahma. Since the word was then touted to be borrowed from the Sanskrit language, the film was prone to a title change, in light of Tamil Nadu's Entertainment Tax Exemption Act, which was passed in 2006. A similar problem was faced by the producers of Aegan, which was also under production at the time. The controversy was later dropped. Ayan was announced to be predominantly set in various locations of both South Asia and Africa. It was made at a production cost of ₹200 million.

=== Casting ===
K. V. Anand announced the film with both Suriya and Tamannaah Bhatia to play the lead roles in the film. Suriya was initially expected to play the lead role in Anand's earlier film but was not able to do so. Ayan would also make Suriya's second film with AVM Productions, after their previous partnership in Perazhagan. Furthermore, Suriya had worked with Anand since Suriya's debut in the 1997 film Nerukku Ner for which Anand was the film's photographer. Suriya's physique was key for his character, as he would be acting as a powerful and active youngster. He also sported 10 different looks in the film, the most for an actor at that time. During the film's launch, he announced that he would give the film his best, understanding the nature of the producers, who previously presented the big-budget film Sivaji. Tamannaah, after starring in the Tamil films Kalloori (for which she was nominated for a Filmfare Award) and Padikathavan, was cast in Ayan. Prabhu was cast in Ayan in a pivotal role, following his previous films in which he played important supporting characters. It was later announced that Anand would introduce a new actor to Tamil cinema in the film, who will be playing a negative role, which was later known to be Akashdeep Saighal, who predominantly worked in Bollywood films.

Apart from the film's cast, the film's crew consisted of Harris Jayaraj as the composer along with Vairamuthu, Pa. Vijay and Na. Muthukumar as the lyricists. M. S. Prabhu was chosen as the film's cinematographer, who was a friend of Anand and worked with him under the guidance of P. C. Sriram.

=== Filming ===
The song "Nenje Nenje" song was shot on the sand dunes of the Namib-Naukluft National Park, Dune 7 and Deadvlei in Namibia, in freezing temperature. Songs were composed in Mauritius, where William Honk choreographed the car chase shots. The stunt sequences were shot at Binny Mills with a huge set resembling an airport while another fight was shot at Cape Town, South Africa. The filming was also held at Kuala Lumpur, Malaysia, Botswana, Zimbabwe and Zanzibar.

== Themes and influences ==
The film's concept revolves around smuggling and custom officers. In order to prepare the script, K. V. Anand did a lot of research and is said to have spoken to a lot of custom officers to understand the modus operandi of smuggling.

== Music ==
The film's soundtrack is composed by Harris Jayaraj, in his fourth collaboration with Suriya, after Kaakha Kaakha, Ghajini and Vaaranam Aayiram, and his first collaboration with director K. V. Anand. Harris composed all the songs in Mauritius. The film's audio launch took place on 10 January 2009, at the office of Sun TV Network in Chennai, with the presence of the film's cast and crew. The audio launch had a live telecast on Sun Music. The film features six tracks, with lyrics written by Na. Muthukumar, Vairamuthu and Pa. Vijay.

== Reception ==
=== Critical reception ===
Malathi Rangarajan of The Hindu wrote: "Ayan is Suriya’s show all the way. He bears the onus with a smile and the death-defying stunts add to the robust image he aims to project". Sify rated 3 out of 5 stars stating "Paisa Vasool" (transl. Box office hit). Rediff.com rated 3.5 out of 5 stars stating "Ayan is definitely a must-watch." A critic from Bangalore Mirror wrote that "As a package, Ayan is a complete entertainer all the way". Reviewing the Telugu-dubbed version, Jeevi of Idlebrain.com wrote that "On a whole, Veedokkade is a slickly executed action flick".

=== Box-office ===
In Chennai alone, box office totals were reported as ₹7 crore (US$750,000) in theatrical revenue. International distribution rights were sold to Ayngaran International. Ayan's revenue was US$1,046,027 in Malaysia and £119,220 in the UK. The film's Telugu dubbed version, Veedokkade, was sold to Hyderabad based producer, Bellamkonda Suresh. The final worldwide box office was around ₹80 crore (US$8.5 million). The film ran over 100 days in Kerala. The Telugu dubbed version Veedokkade ran over 100 days in Andhra Pradesh.

== Awards ==
Ayan received the most nominations at the 57th Filmfare Awards South (12) and the 4th Annual Vijay Awards (18).

Award	Category	Recipients	Result	Ref.
57th Filmfare Awards South	Best Actor – Tamil	Suriya	Nominated	
57th Filmfare Awards South	Best Director – Tamil	K.V. Anand	Nominated	
57th Filmfare Awards South	Best Film – Tamil	Ayan	Nominated	
57th Filmfare Awards South	Best Lyricist – Tamil	Na. Muthukumar ("Vizhi Moodi")	Won	
57th Filmfare Awards South	Best Lyricist – Tamil	Vairamuthu ("Nenje Nenje")	Nominated	
57th Filmfare Awards South	Best Male Playback – Tamil	Harish Raghavendra ("Nenje Nenje")	Nominated	
57th Filmfare Awards South	Best Male Playback – Tamil	Karthik ("Vizhi Moodi")	Nominated	
57th Filmfare Awards South	Best Music Director – Tamil	Harris Jayaraj	Won	
57th Filmfare Awards South	Best Supporting Actor – Tamil	Prabhu	Nominated	
57th Filmfare Awards South	Best Supporting Actor – Tamil	Jagan	Nominated	
57th Filmfare Awards South	Best Supporting Actress – Tamil	Renuka	Nominated	
57th Filmfare Awards South	Best Choreography – South	Dinesh ("Pala Pala")	Won	
4th Vijay Awards	Best Actor	Suriya	Nominated	
4th Vijay Awards	Best Art Director	Rajeevan	Nominated	
4th Vijay Awards	Best Choreographer	Dhinesh ("Pala Pala")	Nominated	
4th Vijay Awards	Best Director	K. V. Anand	Nominated	
4th Vijay Awards	Favourite Director	K. V. Anand	Nominated	
4th Vijay Awards	Best Entertainer	Suriya	Won	
4th Vijay Awards	Favourite Hero	Suriya	Nominated	
4th Vijay Awards	Favourite Heroine	Tamannaah Bhatia	Nominated	
4th Vijay Awards	Favourite Film	Ayan	Won	
4th Vijay Awards	Favourite Song	Harris Jayaraj ("Vizhi Mooodi")	Nominated	
4th Vijay Awards	Best Lyricist	Vairamuthu ("Nenje Nenje")	Nominated	
4th Vijay Awards	Best Male Playback	Harish Raghavendra ("Nenje Nenje")	Nominated	
4th Vijay Awards	Best VFX Compositor	Srinivas Karthik Kotamraju (EFX)	Nominated	
4th Vijay Awards	Best Supporting Actor	Jagan	Nominated	
4th Vijay Awards	Best Comedian	Jagan	Nominated	
4th Vijay Awards	Best Stunt Director	Kanal Kannan	Nominated	
4th Vijay Awards	Best Costume Designer	Nalini Sriram	Nominated	
4th Vijay Awards	Icon of the Year	Suriya	Won	
Meera Isaiaruvi Tamil Music Awards	Best Album of the Year	Harris Jayaraj	Won	
South Scope Awards	Best Actor – Tamil	Suriya	Nominated	
South Scope Awards	Best Actress – Tamil	Tamannaah Bhatia	Nominated	
South Scope Awards	Best Supporting Actor – Tamil	Prabhu	Won	
South Scope Awards	Best Comedian – Tamil	Jagan	Nominated	
South Scope Awards	Best Music Director – Tamil	Harris Jayaraj	Won	
South Scope Awards	Best Male Playback – Tamil	Harish Raghavendra (Nenje Nenje)	Nominated	
South Scope Awards	Best Male Playback – Tamil	Karthik ("Vizhi Moodi")	Nominated	
South Scope Awards	Best Female Playback – Tamil	Mahathi ("Nenje Nenje")	Nominated	
South Scope Awards	Best Lyricist – Tamil	Na. Muthukumar ("Vizhi Moodi")	Won	
South Scope Awards	Best Cinematographer – Tamil	M. S. Prabhu	Nominated	
