= 7 Aum Arivu =

2011 Indian Tamil science fiction martial arts film

- Theatrical release poster
- Directed by: A. R. Murugadoss
- Written by: A. R. Murugadoss
- Produced by: Udhayanidhi Stalin
- Starring: Suriya; Shruti Haasan; Johnny Trí Nguyễn
- Cinematography: Ravi K. Chandran
- Edited by: Anthony
- Music by: Harris Jayaraj
- Production company: Red Giant Movies
- Distributed by: Red Giant Movies
- Release date: 25 October 2011
- Running time: 168 minutes
- Country: India
- Language: Tamil
- Budget: est. ₹80–85 crore
- Box office: est. ₹100–109 crore (Note: According to The Times of India and Kungumam, the film grossed ₹100 crore (equivalent to ₹225 crore or US$23 million in 2026) worldwide. Moneycontrol reported that the film grossed ₹109 crore (equivalent to ₹245 crore or US$25 million in 2026) worldwide.)

7 Aum Arivu (Tamil pronunciation: [eːɻaːm ariʋu] transl. The seventh sense) is a 2011 Indian Tamil-language science fiction action thriller film written and directed by A. R. Murugadoss and produced by Udhayanidhi Stalin under Red Giant Movies. The film features Suriya in dual roles, along with Shruti Haasan (in her Tamil debut), and Johnny Trí Nguyễn. In the film, a genetics student enlists the help of a descendant of Bodhidharma, to revive Bodhidharma's skills to stop a Chinese mercenary with hypnotic powers from starting a government-planned biological war against India.

The film was announced in May 2010 with principal photography commencing the following month and continued for a year before being completed by July 2011. Filming was held predominantly in Chennai, Coimbatore with sporadic schedules in parts of China, Bangkok and Hong Kong. The film's music is composed by Harris Jayaraj, with cinematography being handled by Ravi K. Chandran and editing done by Anthony. The visual effects for the film were provided by Legacy Effects.

7 Aum Arivu was released on 25 October 2011 in Chennai and a day later, on Diwali, worldwide. The film received mixed reviews from critics, but was a commercial success and received seven nominations at the Filmfare Awards South, including Best Film – Tamil and a nomination for Best Actor – Tamil at the inaugural South Indian International Movie Awards, while winning two awards each at the Ananda Vikatan Cinema Awards and Vijay Awards, respectively.

== Plot ==
Bodhidharma, a master of martial arts and medical remedies, is the son of a great Indian king of the Pallava dynasty. He is sent to China by his guru, who requests him to stop the spread of an epidemic existing there from spreading to India. Initially, the Chinese treat him as an inferior. However, when he cures a little girl infected by the disease and defeats people who ill-treated the villagers, the Chinese then began to respect and worship him. He begins to teach them how to cure many diseases, the skills of hypnotism, and the physical training of the Shaolin monks that led to the creation of Shaolinquan. After several years, when he expresses his desire to return to India, the villagers believing that their village would be free of diseases if he were buried there, plot to poison him and bury him near the temple. Bodhidharma agrees to die and subsequently becomes a fundamental figure in Chinese history, affectionately being dubbed "Damo".

In modern-day China, Dong Lee, a mercenary working for the Chinese government, is given the task of starting a government-planned biological war against India, called Operation Red. He arrives in Chennai and commences by injecting a virus into a pariah dog, with the virus being the same strain as the one from Bodhidharma's time. Meanwhile, Subha Srinivasan, a genetics student, discovers that Bodhidharma can be brought back to life if his sample of DNA is matched with another sample of DNA. Coincidentally, she finds a matching sample in Aravind, a descendant of Bodhidharma who is working as a circus artist. Lee finds out about Subha's mission to revive Bodhidharma and plans to kill her first.

Subha approaches Aravind for the sake of the mission. One day, Aravind's family sees Subha and clearly remembers that she visited them a year before to find Aravind and learn all about him for her research on Bodhidharma. Saving herself, she lies that she does not know them. Later that night, Aravind's uncle tells him Subha visited them a year before. Aravind meets her and is enraged upon realising the truth. However, the next day, he reconciles with her and agrees to contribute to the research. The research begins to resurrect Bodhidharma and to end Operation Red. Meanwhile, Lee continues to wreak havoc on the city.

Subha goes to her genetics department and announces that Operation Red can be stopped if they read and make use of the cures in a book written by Bodhidharma. However, the department refuses to believe and looks down on her, claiming that an ancient book is of no use in modern times. After some time, she and Aravind learn that her professor from the genetics department is assisting Lee in Operation Red. They sneak into the professor's apartment and learn about the operation. The next day, the professor is caught by Aravind, Subha, and her friends Ashwin, Imran, Malathi and Nisha but surrenders and explains that he received a huge sum of money from the Chinese government to carry out Operation Red. After the professor gives the group more details about Operation Red and how to stop it, they leave. However, Lee eventually arrives, and the professor once again teams up with him to save his own life. Lee is now even more determined to kill the entire group, especially Aravind, after he was unable to hypontize him and after finding out that he's a descendant of Bodhidharma.

Subha, Aravind, and the group barely escape from an attempt on their lives by Lee. They finally locate a research centre where they can complete their research and decide to make it their base of operation for a few days. They all deactivate their phones so that nobody can trace them. However, Lee traces them through Malathi and Imran, before killing them. Lee then locates the research centre. Subha and her friends in the research centre escape in a van, but Lee catches them. An unconscious Aravind eventually awakens Bodhidharma's powers, using them to fight and kill Lee in battle. Aravind uses an ancient medicine to cure the disease, marries Subha and finally tells the press about the importance of Indian history.

== Cast ==
- Suriya in a dual role as:
  - Bodhidharma
  - Aravind
- Shruti Haasan as Subha Srinivasan
- Johnny Trí Nguyễn as Dong Lee
- Ilavarasu as Aravind's uncle
- Sujatha as Aravind's aunt
- Guinness Pakru as Aravind's friend
- Ramanathan as Prof. Rangarajan V.
- Dhanya Balakrishna as Malathi
- Saahil Chitkara as Imran Saahil
- Meesha Ghoshal as Nisha
- Ashwin Kakumanu as Ashwin
- Avinash as a Tamil king
- Urmila Unni as a Tamil queen of the Pallava dynasty
- Abhinaya as Bodhidharma's wife (cameo appearance)

== Production ==
=== Development ===
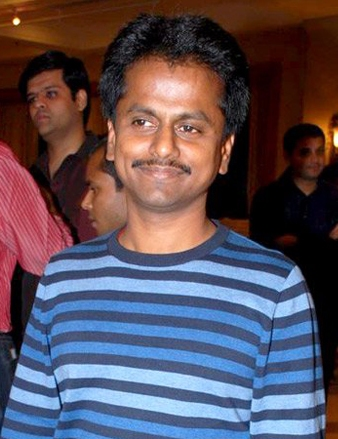
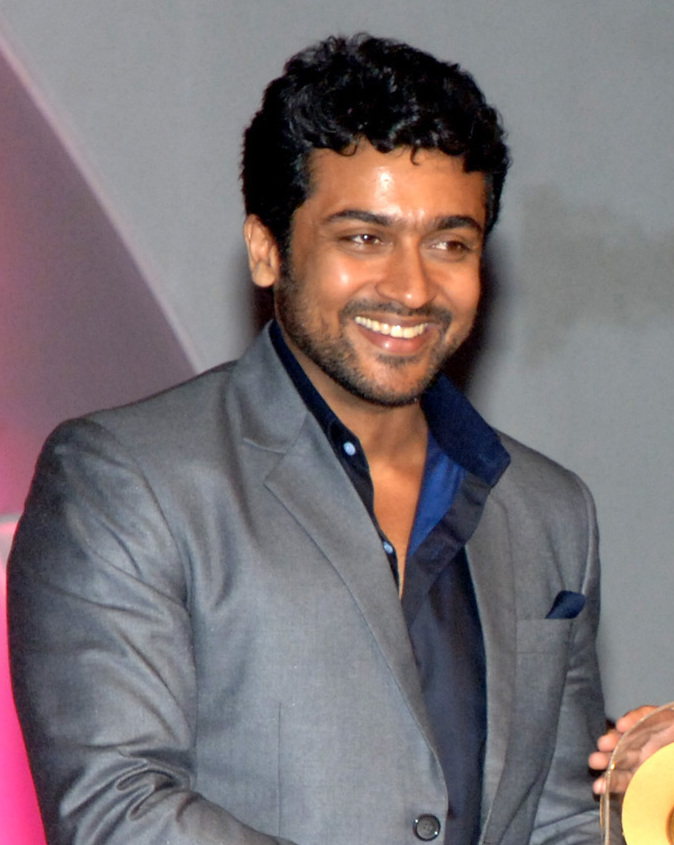
(L to R) Director A. R. Murugadoss and actor Suriya.

In late 2009, director A. R. Murugadoss intended to collaborate with Salman Khan to remake the Telugu film Kick (2009), which was produced by Sajid Nadiadwala. But the plans did not materialise and Murugadoss later decided to collaborate with Suriya for another project. It was produced by Udhayanidhi Stalin under Red Giant Movies, in their fourth production venture following Kuruvi (2008), Aadhavan (2009) and Manmadan Ambu (2010). The company made a public announcement in May 2010, also announcing the title as 7 Aum Arivu. The technical crew includes music composer Harris Jayaraj, cinematographer Ravi K. Chandran, editor Anthony and production designer Rajeevan.

Murugadoss was intrigued on learning about the descendants of the Buddhist monk Bodhidharma being tracked to Tamil Nadu. Though people worship him for spreading Zen Buddhism and martial arts, and being deified in several parts of the world, there had been minimal awareness in India. As a result, he researched extensively on providing details that referred to Bodhidharma and his ancestors. It took him nearly ten-months for the pre-production. Murugadoss further admitted that the film's first 15 minutes would be set during the 6th century on tracking Bodhidharma's origins and remain completely authentic, while the outstanding portions were to be set in the present period.

=== Casting ===
"We are documenting an important personality. So it has to be as close as possible to real life facts as we know them. This person is supposed to be the wide-eyed barbarian. On the Internet he is called the 'blue-eyed barbarian'. Of course I had to be Bodhidharma and not Suriya."

— Suriya on playing Bodhidharma for 7 Aum Arivu

Suriya portrayed two different roles—one being Bodhidharma, and the other being his fictional descendant, a circus artist. Speaking to Radhika Rajamani of Rediff.com, he said it took him a long time to authentically portray the character, and a lot of effort was required. Suriya watched Osho's videos for bringing the serenity in his eyes as well as incorporating with the mystic's calmness and further practised martial artists from stunt choreographer Peter Hein by referencing few online videos and discussed with the crew enquiring on the right way to perform those stunts. For portraying the circus artist, Suriya worked with the crew of the Great Bombay Circus and stayed with them for a night which he called "a wonderful experience" as the crew employed people from various states. A trainer from Rajkamal Circus was hired to help Suriya get the body language of a trapeze artist.

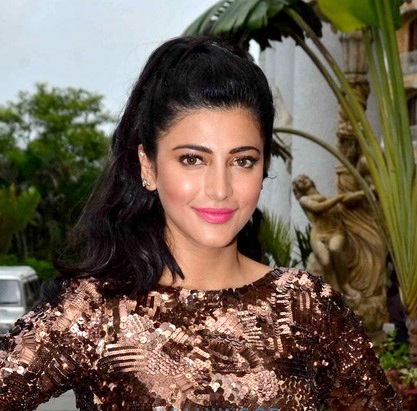
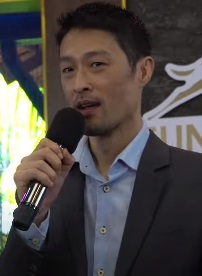
Shruti Haasan (left) plays the lead actress and Johnny Trí Nguyễn (right) plays the antagonist.

The film marked Shruti Haasan's Tamil debut as a lead actress, after having previously acted in Hindi and Telugu films. She played the role of a scientist researching Bodhidharma's roots. Murugadoss said he wanted a beautiful and intelligent woman, hence he chose Haasan for the role. Vietnamese American actor and martial artist Johnny Trí Nguyễn was signed to play the antagonist. He received the offer when he was in contact with Peter Hein, and the latter recommended his name to Murugadoss for someone who can perform numerous action sequences. Describing his experience in the film, Trí Nguyễn stated:

"There are quite a few scenes that have elaborate fights between Suriya and me [...] When I started work on 7am Arivu, I had no expectations. But I was pleasantly surprised when Murugadoss asked me to shoot a lengthy action scene on a highway in the middle of a traffic jam on the very first day of the schedule. Cars were flipping and vehicles were crashing all around. I was quite surprised when I learnt about the unit's pre-production work and the number of days they spent in choreographing the scene."

Abhinaya was cast as Bodhidharma's wife, reportedly because the director wanted a "non-glamorous" actress for the role. Ashwin Kakumanu was cast in a supporting role after Murugadoss saw him in Nadunisi Naaygal (2011). Dhanya Balakrishna had stated that though her friends were against her taking up supporting roles, it did not stop her from accepting one in 7 Aum Arivu. Malayalam actress Urmila Unni made her Tamil debut in the film.

=== Filming ===
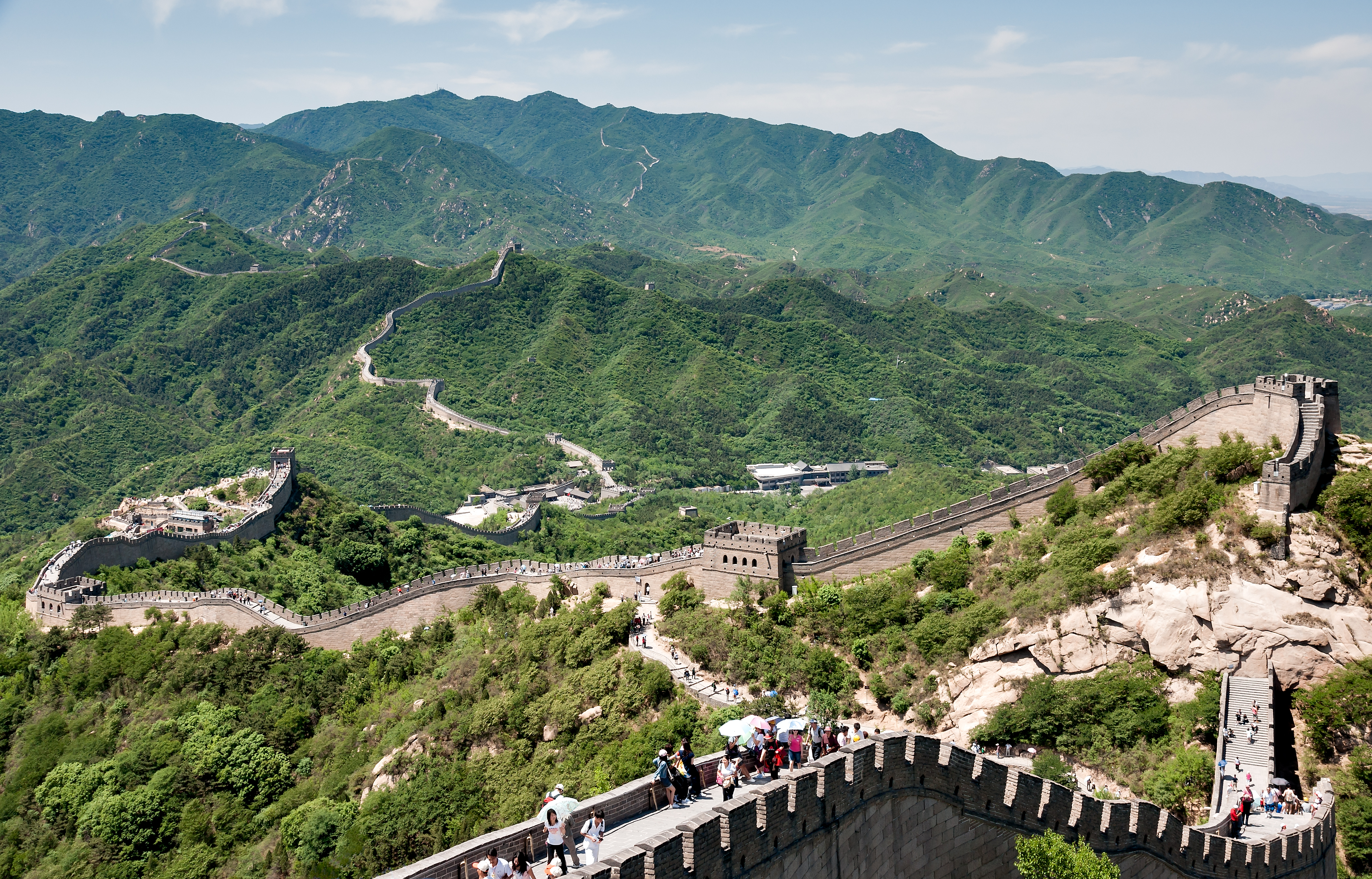
The opening sequence of the film was shot in China.

Principal photography began in June 2010 at Chennai. The team shot a sequence at the Ampa Skywalk, followed by the song "Oh Ringa Ringa". It was filmed in over 40 locations in and around the city, including Besant Nagar and Ranganathan Street in T. Nagar, with around 500–1000 junior artists who rehearsed their dance choreography at the AVM Studios for three days. According to the song choreographer Shobi, "The place is so crowded that two people cant even walk side by side at a given time. But, we made Suriya, along with 500 other dancers, shake their legs to the number. We shot the sequence using hidden cameras." Many dancers had to be outsourced from other regions as the makers could not find enough dancers in Chennai. In late August, Haasan suffered an elbow injury during the filming of a stunt sequence. Later in early December, Suriya had a spinal injury after a stunt sequence.

By August 2010, the team moved to Coimbatore for filming the circus portions at the Great Bombay Circus, and Suriya performed the trapeze acts under the supervision of Pratap Master. Suriya underwent physical training for a kung fu sequence within 16 days, following Ravi K. Chandran's request. The team then moved to China for filming the 6th century portions; the fifteen minutes of the edited film reportedly cost ₹15 crore (equivalent to ₹34 crore or US$3.5 million in 2026). On shooting in China, Suriya added that the people there were excited and had learnt new things, while also adding that "At 3 am, the whole crew (even kids) would be ready with their costumes and make-up. It was not a burden for them; it was not like working on another project, it was like worship for them, it was like being in a temple. The discipline and respect they showed and the support they gave was amazing."

In January 2011, the team moved to Bangkok for filming the song "Mun Andhi" with Suriya and Haasan, and few portions of the song were also shot in Hong Kong. Shabina Khan designed the costumes for Suriya and Haasan, staying with the team throughout the filming process. Afterwards, the team moved to Chennai for filming the climax sequence in the Tambaram and Pallavaram bypass area. Despite shooting 80 percent of the film, Ravi K. Chandran left the project as his dates clashed with Agneepath (2012), but returned in May 2011. During his absence, cinematographer Ravi Varman shot the remaining portions. The team further shot few sequences at the IIT Madras research institute in Chennai. Filming continued for over a year before wrapping in July 2011.

=== Post-production ===
Suriya began dubbing for his portions in the film and completed it by July 2011. Legacy Effects handled the visual effects supervision in their second Indian film after Enthiran (2010). The visual effects were made at an approximate cost of ₹10 crore (equivalent to ₹22 crore or US$2.3 million in 2026). The budget of the film was estimated to be around ₹80 crore (equivalent to ₹180 crore or US$19 million in 2026) to ₹85 crore (equivalent to ₹191 crore or US$20 million in 2026).

== Themes and influences ==
Media reports claimed that the film drew inspirations from the Christopher Nolan-directed Inception (2010), but Murugadoss dismissed those reports reasoning that he had begun shooting much before the release of Inception. After the film's release, it was reported that the film shared similarities to the Assassin's Creed game series. Some were of the opinion that the film and the game were based on the same concept of a modern-day man gaining his ancestor's powers through scientific means, despite being different in other aspects. Velayudham, which had released alongside 7 Aum Arivu was also compared with the game though for different reasons. Sudhish Kamath in his column for The Hindu opined that 7 Aum Arivu is a superhero film, but it had "a broad base in science though the premise of telepathy and hypnotism itself is comic book stuff."

== Music ==
The soundtrack featured musical score composed by Harris Jayaraj in his second collaboration with Murugadoss after Ghajini (2005). The lyrics for the songs were written by Pa. Vijay, Na. Muthukumar, Kabilan and Madhan Karky, who wrote a Chinese track. The album was released by Sony Music India on 22 September 2011.

== Release ==
7 Aum Arivu was considered a highly anticipated film in Tamil cinema, owing to the previous successful collaboration of Suriya and Murugadoss with Ghajini. The film was originally intended to release theatrically in the summer (April–June) of 2011, but was delayed as production was not completed on time to meet that release window. Udhayanidhi then confirmed that the film would be released on Diwali (26 October 2011). The film's promotional material created anticipation among film buffs to know about Bodhidharma's history.

The film was set to clash with Velayudham and the Hindi film Ra.One. Udhayanidhi then announced that the film would be opened a day prior (25 October), with paid premieres being held across Chennai city and suburbs. The film was given a U certificate by the Central Board of Film Certification, but did not get the 30 percent entertainment tax waiver until more than 100 days after release. A special screening was held for Shruti Haasan's father, actor Kamal Haasan.

The film was the largest release in Suriya's career, opening with 1000 prints worldwide, with 400 prints in Tamil Nadu alone. In Chennai, the film released in 51 screens. It was dubbed into Telugu as 7th Sense and had the second largest release in Andhra Pradesh for a dubbed film by opening up in 400 screens across the state. The Kerala distribution rights were acquired by Ravi of Divya Pictures for ₹2.5 crore (equivalent to ₹5.6 crore or US$580,000 in 2026) and was released in over 100 screens. The producers also planned for a Hindi dubbed version, owing to Murugadoss' popularity in North India after the success of Ghajini (2008), but that did not happen. In Malaysia, the film was released in a then-record 53 screens. In the United States, the film was released in 50 screens for both Tamil and Telugu versions.

Upon its release in Sri Lanka, 7 Aum Arivu underwent censorship, wherein dialogues deemed pro-Tamil or politically sensitive were removed from the theatrical cuts. The Hindu Makkal Katchi (HMK) criticized the filmmakers for agreeing to these cuts, arguing it favored box office profit over the Tamil pride theme marketed in India. However, after Udhayanidhi promised not to release future Tamil films in Sri Lanka, HMK dropped their decision to protest against the film.

== Reception ==
=== Box office ===
7 Aum Arivu had a strong opening on 25 October, a day prior to Diwali. It collected around ₹2.35 crore (equivalent to ₹5.3 crore or US$550,000 in 2026) in Chennai in its opening weekend. The film earned ₹40.25 crore (equivalent to ₹91 crore or US$9.4 million in 2026) in its six-day opening weekend from all over the world. In Chennai alone, the film grossed ₹9 crore (equivalent to ₹20 crore or US$2.1 million in 2026) in its lifetime. Indian film trades considered the film a commercial success, despite a high budget and distribution price. 7 Aum Arivu grossed an estimated ₹100 crore (equivalent to ₹225 crore or US$23 million in 2026)–₹109 crore (equivalent to ₹245 crore or US$25 million in 2026) worldwide in its lifetime; it was reported to be Suriya's first film to cross ₹100 crore at the box office. According to Udhayanidhi, it was the third highest-grossing Tamil film at the time of its release.

=== Critical reception ===
The film received mixed reviews from critics. J. Hurtado of Screen Anarchy wrote, "7aam Arivu is a good film with flashes of greatness. It is bogged down with commercial elements that do a grave disservice to the film we could have seen". Pavithra Srinivasan of Rediff.com rated the film three stars out of five, noting that the film was "worth a watch" and had "several things working for it". N. Venkateswaran of The Times of India also rated the film three stars, saying, "If the movie deserves a look, it is only because of the ever-dependable Suriya" and was critical of Shruti Haasan's dialogue delivery. Malathi Rangarajan of The Hindu wrote, "Murugadoss could have started off with a credible line at a lesser level, before trying the seventh. All the same, plaudits to him for a sincere attempt to steer clear of the usual."

Sify wrote that "the effort of Murugadoss to make a special kind of film is laudable but seems to lack the imagination required to pull off what he set out to achieve". The New Indian Express also noted that the film had "a brilliant opening, after which the rest lacks focus and coherence" and concluded that "watch it for the first 20 minutes". Deccan Herald wrote, "despite its techical finesse, Suriya's 'sang froid' sophistry, Shruthi's pretty as picture presence, "7am Arivu", instead of being a savvy, slick thriller, turns out into a jingoistic, mindless moralising "jugaad"." Reviewing the Telugu-dubbed version, Jeevi of Idlebrain.com rated the film three out of five and wrote that "7th Sense is an example for a big-star-cast-huge-budgeted movie that looks wonderful on the paper, but falters in the execution. The concept is innovative, but format/screenplay/arch is not good enough to narrate this story in an arresting fashion".

=== Accolades ===
The film was one out of several films selected by the South Indian Film Chamber of Commerce as the Indian submission for the Academy Award for Best Foreign Language Film that year.

Award (Note: Awards, festivals and organisations are in alphabetical order.)	Date of ceremony (Note: Date is linked to the article about the awards held that year, wherever possible.)	Category	Recipient(s)	Result	Ref.
Ananda Vikatan Cinema Awards	5 January 2012	Best Art Direction	Rajeevan	Won	
Ananda Vikatan Cinema Awards	5 January 2012	Best Makeup Artist	Banu Bashyam, A. Kodhandapaani	Won	
Filmfare Awards South	7 July 2012	Best Film – Tamil	7 Aum Arivu – Red Giant Movies	Nominated	
Filmfare Awards South	7 July 2012	Best Director – Tamil	A. R. Murugadoss	Nominated	
Filmfare Awards South	7 July 2012	Best Actor – Tamil	Suriya	Nominated	
Filmfare Awards South	7 July 2012	Best Actress – Tamil	Shruti Haasan	Nominated	
Filmfare Awards South	7 July 2012	Best Music Director – Tamil	Harris Jayaraj	Nominated	
Filmfare Awards South	7 July 2012	Best Lyricist – Tamil	Na. Muthukumar – ("Mun Andhi")	Nominated	
Filmfare Awards South	7 July 2012	Best Male Playback Singer – Tamil	Karthik – ("Mun Andhi")	Nominated	
Mirchi Music Awards South	4 August 2012	Best Male Playback Singer – Tamil	S. P. Balasubrahmanyam – ("Yamma Yamma")	Won	
Mirchi Music Awards South	4 August 2012	Best Lyricist – Tamil	Pa. Vijay – ("Innum Enna Thozha")	Won	
Mirchi Music Awards South	4 August 2012	Listeners' Choice Award for Best Album – Tamil	7 Aum Arivu	Won	
South Indian International Movie Awards	21–22 June 2012	Best Actor – Tamil	Suriya	Nominated	
Vijay Awards	16 June 2012	Best Actor	Suriya	Nominated	
Vijay Awards	16 June 2012	Best Villain	Johnny Trí Nguyễn	Nominated	
Vijay Awards	16 June 2012	Best Debut Actress	Shruti Haasan	Nominated	
Vijay Awards	16 June 2012	Best Cinematographer	Ravi K. Chandran	Nominated	
Vijay Awards	16 June 2012	Best Art Director	Rajeevan	Nominated	
Vijay Awards	16 June 2012	Best Dialogue	A. R. Murugadoss	Nominated	
Vijay Awards	16 June 2012	Best Stunt Director	Peter Hein	Nominated	
Vijay Awards	16 June 2012	Best Make Up	A. Kodhandapaani	Won	
Vijay Awards	16 June 2012	Best Costume Designer	Anu Vardhan, Murthy	Won	
Vijay Awards	16 June 2012	Favourite Hero	Suriya	Nominated	
Vijay Awards	16 June 2012	Favourite Film	7 Aum Arivu – Red Giant Movies	Nominated	
Vijay Awards	16 June 2012	Favourite Director	A. R. Murugadoss	Nominated	

== Historical accuracy ==
Some criticism toward the film involved historical inaccuracies pertaining to Bodhidharma. Bikku Bodhi Bala, professor of Pali and Buddhist studies at the Tamil Nadu Theological Seminary, Madurai, expressed his disappointment on the inaccuracies as Bodhidharma had travelled from India to China with the main intention of propagating Buddhism and his portrayal as a man with "medicinal knowledge" and his expertise at "martial arts" were not well received among researchers, claiming that the film gives too much emphasis on his identity as a Tamilian rather than highlighting the other facts.

Stalin Rajangam, a researcher in Tamil Buddhism, commented that the film failed to discuss about his contribution to Buddhism, and admitted that it "should have ideally discussed the relationship between Tamil society and Buddhism". Historian S. Theodore Baskaran noted that "Tamil films have scant regard for history. Almost always, they confuse between history and folklore", and compared 7 Aum Arivu to other Tamil films such as Veerapandiya Kattabomman (1959) and Parthiban Kanavu (1960) which had historical inaccuracies.

Babu T. Raghu, a Bangalore-based Buddhist teacher, noted in a press conference that the monk was 150 years old when he reached China, while in the film they had depicted him in his 20s. He also said that the film showed the exhumation of his body while in reality Bodhidharma's body was never found and claimed that his life and death had been portrayed wrongly. Babu added that he had material evidence to prove it, while sparking off a hunger strike across the country on Bodhidharma's followers.

== Legacy ==
In March 2020, during the outbreak of the COVID-19 pandemic in India, 7 Aum Arivu resurfaced as one among the few South Indian films that highlighted viral outbreaks which included Dasavathaaram (2008), Vaayai Moodi Pesavum (2014) and the Malayalam film Virus (2019); 7 Aum Arivu was primarily discussed among cinephiles as the film's themes had foreshadowed the global pandemic scenario. The film also became a subject of an internet meme, along with Suriya's other films, during that same year as his films had predicted the future scenarios around the world.

== In other media ==
In Massu Engira Masilamani (2015), Suriya appears as a fake exorcist at Brahmanandam's house, helping him to get rid of ghosts; the latter visualises him as a saint during his introduction, with the song "The Rise of Damo (Mandarin)" used as a callback to the character. The character Bodhidharma was spoofed in Tamizh Padam 2 (2018), while the song "Kalavarame" contains various callbacks to "Mun Andhi". The song "Yellae Lama" was also featured in the 2026 Tamil film Thaai Kizhavi.
