= Paruthiveeran =

2007 film by Ameer Sultan

- Poster
- Directed by: Ameer
- Written by: Ameer
- Produced by: Ameer
- Starring: Karthi; Priyamani
- Cinematography: Ramji
- Edited by: Raja Mohammad
- Music by: Yuvan Shankar Raja
- Production company: Teamwork Production House
- Distributed by: Studio Green
- Release date: 23 February 2007
- Running time: 162 minutes
- Country: India
- Language: Tamil

Paruthiveeran (transl. Hero of Paruthiyur) is a 2007 Indian Tamil-language romantic action drama film written, directed and produced by Ameer. The film stars Karthi in his feature film debut as the title character, with Priyamani as the lead actress. Ponvannan, Saravanan, Ganja Karuppu, Sampath Raj, and Sujatha Sivakumar play supporting roles. The film features a soundtrack and score composed by Yuvan Shankar Raja, cinematography by Ramji and editing by Raja Mohammad.

Paruthiveeran was entirely shot in Madurai and its surroundings. After two years of making, the film was released on 23 February 2007 and received universal critical acclaim. The female lead of this film Priyamani has won the National Film Award for Best Actress (2006) for her intense performance. The film won prizes at major film award ceremonies in India, including two National Film Awards, six Filmfare Awards South and two Tamil Nadu State Film Awards, among others, while being screened at several international film festivals such as the Berlin International Film Festival and the Osian's Cinefan Festival of Asian and Arab Cinema as well. It also emerged as a huge commercial success, running successfully for more than one year in theatres.

== Plot ==
The story is set in a rural area around Madurai in the village called Paruthiyur, in 2005 which still practices caste segregation. Paruthiveeran "Paruthi" is a country brash whose inter-caste parents were ostracized by the villagers since his Rich upper-caste Agamudayar father married his lower-caste Kurava mother. After his parents' death, Paruthi was mostly raised by his doting maternal uncle, Chevvaazhai, and Chevvazhai's mother. Chevvazhai pampers and accompanies him in every misbehavior to keep him happy. Having grown up among his mother's people, he is often arrested for petty crimes. His one ambition in life is to gain enough notoriety to be on the news and to be thrown into Madras Jail. He often bullies the villagers for money and fun.

Paruthi's paternal cousin, Muththazhagu, is the daughter of his snobbish uncle, Kazhuvathevan Servai, who is a respected member of the village and a caste sectarian. Muththazhagu has been in love with Paruthi since their childhood, but he remains unmoved and keeps her at bay. When they were children, Paruthi saved Muththazhagu from drowning in a well. She promised to marry him and be by his side forever and starts to love him against her parents' will as they do not approve of Parututhi's inter-caste background. In order to delay her marriage with anybody else, she fails in her tests at school on purpose to be in the same grade class as she might be married off if she finishes school. At times, Paruthi is violent towards her, but she still loves him. When Paruthi finally accepts Muththazhagu's love for him and decides to marry her, the feud between the two families comes in the way.

Determined to marry Muththazhagu, he goes to Kazhuvathevan's house and formally asks for her hand in marriage. He is again shamed off, and in the ensuing melee he warns her against marrying anyone else by threatening to cut her into pieces. Undeterred by his threats, her parents press ahead with the preparations for her marriage with a boy of their choice. Since Muththazhagu is not able to convince her parents otherwise, she runs away from home in order to elope with Paruthi. However, while hiding away in an abandoned building while Paruthi is away making the necessary marital arrangements, she comes across four of Paruthi's acquaintances who mistake her for one of his prostitutes. They brutally gang rape and leave her to die.

Later, Paruthiveeran returns and finds her dying from bleeding. She begs Paruthi to cut her into pieces as she does not want anybody to find her in her present state and dies. He tries to take her out from there, but sees people approaching the house. He comes back inside with her dead body and locks the house from the inside. When he realises it is Kazhuvathevan and her family that have come to kill him, he does not want them to see her in that state. He goes mad and chops her body up and runs towards them saying he will not allow her to marry anyone else. Kazhuvathevan and his henchmen see her mutilated dead body inside and brutally thrash Paruthi. His time with Muththazhagu flashes before his eyes as he breathes his last.

== Cast ==
- Karthi as Paruthiveeran "Paruthi"
- Priyamani as Muththazhagu
- Ponvannan as Kazhuvan, Muththazhagu's father and Paruthi's paternal uncle
- Saravanan as Chevvaazhai, Paruthi's paternal uncle
- Sujatha Sivakumar as Komalavalli (Muththazhagu's mother)
- Ganja Karuppu as Douglas
- Sampath Raj as Marudhu, Paruthi's father
- Panjavarnam as Mangayee
- Ammulu as Kuraththi
- Sevvalai Rasu as Ponanthinni
- Mu Ramaswamy as a villager
- Samuthirakani as ice vendor (uncredited)

== Production ==
=== Casting ===
Karthi made his full-fledged acting debut. Although Karthi revealed he preferred directing to acting, he agreed to play the titular character in Paruthiveeran because the film was "so compelling". About 60 debutants, mostly real-time people from the region, appeared in the film. No dubbing artists were involved in the production and all artists were brought to Chennai had dubbed their original voice.

=== Filming ===
Filming began in July 2005.

== Music ==
The film's score as well as the soundtrack were scored by Yuvan Shankar Raja, teaming up with his friend Ameer following two successive successful collaborations in Mounam Pesiyadhe (2002) and Raam (2005). The soundtrack album was released on 13 November 2006 at Green Park Hotel in Chennai, with several prominent film personalities participating in the event, including fellow actor Vijay, who launched the audio. The album consists of six songs, including one instrumental track, featuring the nadaswaram only. It features vocals from Yuvan Shankar Raja's father Ilaiyaraaja, director Ameer himself and professional playback singers Shreya Ghoshal, Manikka Vinayagam and Madhumitha. Moreover, a couple of traditional, village-based singers contributed to the album by lending their voice to a few songs. All lyrics were written by Snehan. Paruthiveeran was notably the first ever entirely village-based film Yuvan Shankar Raja had scored music for. He composed a folk music-based score and used rural sounds with instruments as dholak, nadaswaram, thavil and urumee.

Yuvan Shankar Raja received critical acclaim for his score, while the soundtrack album initially got mostly unfavorable reviews, being described as a "letdown" and "disappointment", raising to question whether it could attract today's "modern" audience. Following the film's release however, critics unanimously made very positive remarks in regards to the film score. Baradwaj Rangan labelled it a "magnificently earthy score", while Malathi Rangarajan noted that the composer "proves he is a chip off the old block in rustic music too". Other critics hailed his music as "excellent". The song "Oororam Puliyamaram" in particular was a chartbuster, also being chosen as the "Best Folk Song of the Year 2007" at the Isaiyaruvi Tamil Music Awards, whilst the entire album itself was named as "Isaiyaruvi Best Album of the Year 2007".

Track listing
No.	Title	Singer(s)	Length
1.	"Ariyadha Vayasu"	Ilaiyaraaja, Derrick	3:49
2.	"Ayyayyo"	Krishnaraj, Manikka Vinayagam, Shreya Ghoshal, Yuvan Shankar Raja	4:35
3.	"Nathaswaram"	S. R. Shanmuga Sundaram Group	3:24
4.	"Sari Gama Pathani"	Srimathumitha, Madurai S. Saroja, Ameer	2:16
5.	"Tanka Dunga"	Kala, Lakshmi, Pandi, Raja, Madurai S. Saroja	7:31
6.	"Oororam Puliyamaram"	Kala, Lakshmi, Pandi, Madurai S. Saroja, Karthi	6:27

== Release ==
The film was released on 23 February 2007.

== Reception ==
Sriram Iyer of Rediff gave the film three out of five stars, lauding it as a "remarkable effort" and claiming that Ameer "successfully brings alive the feel of the pastures". The reviewer appreciated the cast and crew, describing Karthi's performance as "excellent", while citing that Saravanan "excels" and Priyamani had done "a fairly good job in her deglamourised role". Russell Edwards of Variety cited, "rough production values are mitigated by a myriad of sophisticated cinematic techniques that show this is no boondocks effort. Fests that appreciate curry flavors will eat this one up, though uninitiated aud[ience]s could experience culture shock". Furthermore, he noted that Ameer's "creative helming, which includes split-screen, appears unbridled and sometimes outright chaotic, but always serves the script", while writing that performances were "consistent with the bombastic storytelling".

Baradwaj Rangan called Paruthiveeran a "classic, one for the ages" and a "showcase for how good filmmaking can (almost) overcome mediocre material", while noting that Karthi gave "a superb first-film performance by any standard, and it makes you reach for that oldest of movie-myth cliches: A star is born." Other critics have offered criticism of the violence and brutality of some sequences in the film. A Sify critic wrote that it was "undoubtedly [...] a brave film and full credit goes to the director for making every scene realistic and characters life-like", while criticizing that Ameer's script was "too thin on logic" and the climax "too heavy, dark and morbid." However, in regards to the performances, the reviewer, too, heaped praise on the actors, describing Karthi as "spectacular" and Saravanan as "terrific" and adding that Priya Mani "... steals the show with her spontaneity and authenticity".

Malathi Rangarajan of The Hindu claimed that the film was "the genuine depiction of village life" that "transports you to the era of classics in a rustic ambience, Bharatiraaja style", further citing that "all the same, when graphic pictures of gang rape and killing in cold blood dominate, things becomes too much to stomach" and that Ameer "only creates the impression that village folks as a whole are a belligerent lot." Lajjavathi of Kalki praised the acting of Karthi, Priyamani and other cast, Ramji's cinematography and Yuvan's music and praised Ameer for giving quality film and the efforts is visible in every scene but panned the violent climax and portrayal of transgender people.

=== Box office ===
Released on 23 February 2007, Paruthiveeran faced competition from Mozhi, which was released on the same day. The film took a big opening at the Chennai box office, collecting ₹3.69 crore from 92 prints in Tamil Nadu in its opening weekend. The film continued to rank at first at the Chennai box office for five successive weeks, being ousted only by the American film 300 during the Easter weekend. By July, it was declared one of the most commercially successful Tamil films of the year.

== Accolades ==
The film and many of its cast and crew have been awarded or nominated by many associations in India and worldwide for the film. Notably, Priyamani has won the Best Actress prizes at all awards ceremonies. Paruthiveeran was honoured with the "Special Mention" award from the Network for the Promotion of Asian Cinema (NETPAC) at the 58th Berlin International Film Festival. The film was screened five times at the Berlin Film Festival in two German subtitled versions and three English subtitled versions.

2006 National Film Awards (India)

- Silver Lotus Award – Best Actress – Priyamani
- Silver Lotus Award – Best Editor – Raja Mohammad

2007 Osian's Cinefan Festival of Asian and Arab Cinema

- Best Film Award – Paruthiveeran – Ameer Sultan
- Best Actress Award – Priyamani

2008 Berlin International Film Festival (Germany)

- Netpac Award – Special Mention – Ameer

2006 Tamil Nadu State Film Awards

- Tamil Nadu State Film Award for Best Film – Second Prize
- Best Actress – Priyamani
- Special Prize – Actor – Karthi

2007 Filmfare Awards South (India)

- Best Film – Tamil – Paruthiveeran
- Best Director – Tamil – Ameer
- Best Actor – Tamil – Karthi
- Best Actress – Tamil – Priyamani
- Best Supporting Actor – Tamil – Saravanan
- Best Supporting Actress – Tamil – Sujatha Sivakumar
- Nominated – Filmfare Award for Best Music Direction– Tamil – Yuvan Shankar Raja

2007 Vijay Awards

- Best Film – Paruthiveeran
- Best Actress – Priyamani
- Best Supporting Actress – Sujatha
- Best Debut Actor – Karthi
- Nominated – Best Director – Ameer
- Nominated – Best Supporting Actor – Saravanan
- Nominated – Best Music Director – Yuvan Shankar Raja
- Nominated – Best Cinematographer – Ramji
- Nominated – Best Editor – Raja Mohammed
- Nominated – Best Art Director – Jackson
- Nominated – Best Lyricist – Snehan
- Nominated – Best Story-Screenplay Writer – Ameer

== Controversy ==
There was a controversy surrounding the ownership of the film. Ameer has complained that the original producer K. E. Gnanavel Raja, could not finance the film till its completion, so he supposedly gave up the film to Ameer. But towards the completion of the film, Ameer ran out of funds and the film went back to Gnanavel. Since the release of the film, both parties have been accusing each other for failing to make a payment which each owes from the other. As of December 2023, the dispute has not ended.

== Legacy ==
Paruthiveeran is considered responsible for shaping the characterisation of protagonists in later Tamil films, often by depicting them as unkempt ruffians. It was also credited as popularising the "Madurai-made movies", initialised as 3M. Such films often depict Madurai, its surroundings and people as violent, with "murder and mayhem" being key themes. With multiple such films failing at the box office, Ameer felt the "3M theme" was overexposed and overused, saying plot details were being recycled and repeated, leading to public weariness of such films.
