= Aadhavan =

2009 film by K. S. Ravikumar

- Theatrical release poster
- Directed by: K. S. Ravikumar
- Screenplay by: K. S. Ravikumar
- Story by: Ramesh Khanna
- Produced by: Udhayanidhi Stalin
- Starring: Suriya; Nayanthara
- Cinematography: Ganesh Rajavelu
- Edited by: Don Max
- Music by: Harris Jayaraj
- Production company: Red Giant Movies
- Release date: 17 October 2009
- Running time: 168 minutes
- Country: India
- Language: Tamil
- Budget: ₹30 crore

Aadhavan (transl. Sun) is a 2009 Indian Tamil-language action comedy film directed by K. S. Ravikumar, from a story written by Ramesh Khanna, and produced by Udhayanidhi Stalin under Red Giant Movies. The film stars Suriya, alongside Nayanthara, Vadivelu, Anand Babu, Murali, Rahul Dev, Sayaji Shinde and B. Saroja Devi. The music was composed by Harris Jayaraj, while cinematography and editing were handled by Ganesh Rajavelu and Don Max.

Aadhavan was released on 17 October 2009 and became commercially successful. The core plot was loosely based on the 1990 Malayalam film His Highness Abdullah and it was remade in Bengali as Shikari.

== Plot ==
In the US, an unknown client speaks to a mafia group to eradicate a fake godman. The mafia group arranges the hit through a Kolkata-based middleman as the fake godman will be arriving there. The middleman gives the contract to Ibrahim Rowther. The godman gets killed by Ibrahim's adopted son Aadhavan, a skilled mercenary. Aadhavan gets several contracts in various parts of the world as a result of eradicating the godman.

In Mumbai, Aadhavan meets Dr. Abdul Kulkarni, who hires him to kill Subramaniam, a prominent judge as he is handling the inquiry and verdict on Abdul's child kidnapping and organ trafficking cases in Kolkata. Aadhavan unsuccessfully attempts to snipe Subramaniam and Kulkarni insults him. A furious Aadhavan vows to kill Subramaniam within 10 days, where he threatens Subramaniam's servant Kuppan alias Bannerjee to help him get into the house as Murugan, Bannerjee's brother-in-law, by abducting the actual Murugan and have him held in his ship.

Aadhavan slowly begins to win over the members of Subramaniam's household – his mother, her granddaughter Thara, and his other relatives. Thara is attracted to Aadhavan's intelligence and simple-innocent nature. Meanwhile, Subramaniam and his family is on a trip to Darjeeling and Thara asks Aadhavan to hide a guitar belonging to Ilaiyaman, her madcap musician cousin (whose name is a portmanteau of Ilaiyaraaja and A. R. Rahman). Aadhavan uses this opportunity, plants a mobile bomb in the guitar and places it in one of the cars, which explodes at the wrong time.

Meanwhile, a security officer, who is the chief of the security team protecting Subramaniam at Subramaniam's house, keeps informing Kulkarni of Aadhavan's entry and happenings. Thara is now suspicious about Aadhavan and after questioning him in secret, Aadhavan informs her that he is really Subramaniam's long-lost son Madhavan. Thara soon informs all the members of the household about Madhavan's return and they are overjoyed, with Thara and Aadhavan falling in love with each other. However, they hide it from Subramaniam and Ilaiyaman because of Subramaniam's hatred towards Madhavan. Aadhavan tells Bannerjee that he lied to Thara about being Madhavan to distract her suspicions. On Thara's birthday, a flashback reveals that Aadhavan is indeed Subramaniam's long-lost son Madhavan.

Past: A 10-year-old Madhavan unknowingly carries a gift with a hidden bomb for his cousin Thara's birthday. Madhavan's friend's mother plants a bomb in the doll as revenge against Subramaniam for her gangster husband's jail sentence. Though Thara survives, Thara's mother Anu opens the gift and Thara's mother Anu is killed along with Thara's father in the bomb explosion. Subramaniam blames Madhavan for Anu and her husband's death and for Madhavan's friendship with a gangster's son and Subramaniam thrashes Madhavan. Due to Madhavan's anger of his friend's mother and Madhavan's fear of going to a juvenile prison, Madhavan steals a gun from the cops, Madhavan accidentally shoots Subramaniam and Madhavan runs away from his home and kills his friend's mother as she is responsible for Anu and her husband's death. Madhavan saves Ibrahim Rowther from gangsters trying to kill Ibrahim Rowther and Madhavan is re-christened as Aadhavan.

Present: Ibrahim's son Tharani tries to kill Subramaniam, but is stopped by Madhavan who reveals his true identity. Ibrahim challenges that he will kill Subramanian and Madhavan within two days. Kulkarni threatens Ibrahim and his gang to surrender to the police and makes a confession about Madhavan and his plans. When the ACP confronts Madhavan and is about to have him hauled off, Madhavan gets Subramaniam's laptop (containing the verdict and inquiry reports), takes him and Thara as hostages and drives away, after stealing the ACP's gun and using to injure him and the guards, when they intervene on him and killing the security chief. Meanwhile, the police commissioner arrives, arrests the ACP, as he is Kulkarni's man and makes a confession that the police actually had caught Madhavan after his very first attempt to kill Subramaniam. After being questioned by the commissioner, Madhavan said that he backed off and misfired Subramaniam purposely at the last moment after he found that he was going to kill his own father. The police asked him to go back to the house to protect Subramaniam over a 24/7 hiatus time every day, for which Madhavan agreed.

The commissioner used Madhavan to nab individuals linked to various criminal and terrorist organisations. This information is relayed by the commissioner and the family to a grateful Subramaniam who tearfully reunites with his long-lost son Madhavan. Meanwhile, Kulkarni attacks the vehicle in which the trio is travelling, and a fight ensues where Madhavan saves Subramaniam and Thara and kills Kulkarni. The minister and the middleman who were involved in the contract killings are arrested. Madhavan serves a short term in prison for his previous wrongdoings, but is subsequently released from the prison for his contribution to saving Subramaniam. Madhavan and Thara are now married and live in the household with the huge family. Once yet again, Bannerjee brings two assistants (his brothers-in-law) to help him and asks approval from Subramaniam, who then consulted in Madhavan, to check them out, with the whole family being suspicious of them being secretly hitmen. Upon inquiring on them, Madhavan approves of them with the whole family accepting them.

== Cast ==
- Suriya as Madhavan Subramaniam (Aadhavan)
- Nayanthara as Thara
- Vadivelu as Bannerjee
- Anand Babu as Tharani, Aadhavan's foster brother
- Ramesh Khanna as Kuppusamy (Ilaiyamaan)
- Anu Hasan as Anu, Thara's mother, Madhavan's aunt and mother-in-law, Subramaniam's younger sister
- Bharath Murali as Justice Subramaniam, Madhavan's father
- Sayaji Shinde as Ibrahim Rowther, Aadhavan's foster father (voice dubbed by Prithviraj)
- Rahul Dev as Dr. Abdul Kulkarni
- FEFSI Vijayan as Police Commissioner Rathnavelu IPS
- Manobala as Sundaramurthy, Subramaniam's younger brother
- Riyaz Khan as ACP Deva IPS
- Alex as Vasudevan, Subramaniam's younger brother
- Erode Soundar as Subramaniam's relative
- Sathyan as Murugan, Bannerjee's nephew
- B. Saroja Devi as Rajalakshmi, Subramaniam's mother
- Jaya Rekha as Rani, Subramaniam's younger sister-in-law
- Pooja Paresh as Subramaniam's niece

Additionally, the film's director (K. S. Ravikumar), producer (Udhayanidhi Stalin), and Japan Kumar make guest appearances as servants.

== Production ==
Ravikumar met B. Saroja Devi in Singapore and she was subsequently signed to appear in the film, which marked her return to Tamil cinema after twelve years. Shooting for the film began on 19 February 2009, majority of which took place at the Chettinad Palace, Chennai. During the shoot in Kolkata, Suriya jumped off a bridge several times before K. S. Ravikumar okayed the shot. In mid-2009, the "Yeno Yeno Panithuli" song was filmed in Iceland, making Aadhavan the first South Indian film to be shot there. The song was choreographed by Dinesh. The climax scenes of the film featuring Suriya, Murali and Rahul Dev were shot in Cape Town, South Africa from 13 July 2009 to 26 July 2009, with Suriya performed a stunt sequence while hanging from a helicopter on the sixth take despite a shoulder injury. The last song to be filmed was choreographed by Shobi.

== Soundtrack ==
The soundtrack was composed by Harris Jayaraj, which marked his first collaboration with K. S. Ravikumar. Jayaraj began working on the film's music from February 2009. For the titular lyric in "Hasili Fisiliye", Jayaraj and lyricist Pa. Vijay had trouble coming up with a lyric and Jayaraj decided to use a line from a Coca-Cola commercial featuring Vijay that he composed for while working on his debut film Minnale (2001). The song became a popular ringtone. The audio launch was held on 19 August at Sathyam Cinemas, Chennai.

Pavithra Srinivasan from Rediff.com said, "Harris Jeyaraj is one of those composers who is not capable of turning out bad stuff even on a bad day, this album stands out from a mile away." Karthik of Milliblog called it Jayaraj's "weakest score" and said it indicated that the composer was "taking his earlier success for granted".

Tamil track listing
| No. | Title | Lyrics | Singer(s) | Length |
|---|---|---|---|---|
| 1. | "Hasili Fisiliye" | Pa. Vijay | Karthik, Harini, Dr. Burn, Maya | 5:21 |
| 2. | "Yeno Yeno Panithuli" | Thamarai | Shail Hada, Andrea Jeremiah, Sudha Ragunathan | 5:15 |
| 3. | "Dammaku Dammaku" | Na. Muthukumar | Benny Dayal | 4:56 |
| 4. | "Vaarayo Vaarayo" | Kabilan | P. Unnikrishnan, Chinmayi, Megha | 5:20 |
| 5. | "Dekho Dekho" | Vaali | SuVi, Sandhya, Sri Charan, Arjunan Manoharathanan | 5:26 |
| 6. | "Maasi Maasi" | Vaali | Mano, Franko, Megha | 5:32 |
| Total length: | | | | 31:50 |

All tracks are written by Bhuvanachandra.

Telugu track listing
| No. | Title | Singer(s) | Length |
|---|---|---|---|
| 1. | "Asale Pilla" | Karthik, Benny Dayal, Harini, Maya | 5:20 |
| 2. | "Edo Edo" | Shail Hada, Andrea Jeremiah, Sudha Ragunathan, Sri Charan | 5:13 |
| 3. | "Damaku Damaku" | Benny Dayal | 4:56 |
| 4. | "Mrogindi" | Rahul Nambiar, Chinmayi, Megha | 5:20 |
| 5. | "Dekho Dekho" | SuVi, Sandhya, Sri Charan | 5:25 |
| 6. | "Maasi Maasi" | Mano, Megha | 5:31 |
| Total length: | | | 31:45 |

== Release ==
Aadhavan was released on 17 October 2009. It was dubbed into Telugu as Ghatikudu. The film was distributed in Malaysia by Five Star.

=== Critical reception ===
Sify wrote "Ranging through a wide field of comedy laced with action, Aadhavan is good fun while it lasts. It's a roller-coaster ride of pure unadulterated masala". Pavithra Srinivasan from Rediff.com wrote "Aadhavan is uncomplicated, clean, fun, and doesn't expect you to take it seriously." Malathi Rangarajan of The Hindu wrote "Post-interval, you have to wait quite a while for some concrete action from Aadhavan, the Infallible!" The New Indian Express wrote, "[Aadhavan] has action, comedy, sentiment, and romance. But the magic expected from the combination of a leading director and a successful star is clearly missing".

=== Box office ===
The film reportedly grossed over ₹8 crore at the Tamil Nadu box office in its opening weekend. Overseas, the film grossed about $1,541,485, approximately. The film was number one at the Chennai box office in the week ending 27 October. An event celebrating the film's 100-day theatrical run was held at Park Sheraton in Chennai on 23 March 2009.

== Accolades ==
| Award | Category | Nominee | Result | Ref. |
|---|---|---|---|---|
| 4th Vijay Awards | Best Entertainer | Suriya | Won | |
| 4th Vijay Awards | Best Male Playback | Karthik ("Hasili Fisiliye") | Won | |
| 4th Vijay Awards | Best Female Playback | Chinmayi ("Vaarayo Vaarayo") | Won | |
| 4th Vijay Awards | Best Music Director | Harris Jayaraj | Won | |
| 4th Vijay Awards | Icon of the Year | Suriya | Won | |
| 4th Vijay Awards | Best Actor | Suriya | Nominated | |
| 4th Vijay Awards | Best Comedian | Vadivelu | Nominated | |
| 4th Vijay Awards | Best Art Director | Rajeevan | Nominated | |
| 4th Vijay Awards | Best Choreographer | Shobi ("Damakku Damakku") | Nominated | |
| 4th Vijay Awards | Favourite Film | Udhayanidhi Stalin | Nominated | |
| 4th Vijay Awards | Favourite Director | K. S. Ravikumar | Nominated | |
| 4th Vijay Awards | Favourite Hero | Suriya | Nominated | |
| 4th Vijay Awards | Favourite Heroine | Nayanthara | Nominated | |
| 4th Vijay Awards | Favourite Song | Harris Jayaraj ("Hasili Fisiliye") | Nominated | |
