= Agaram Foundation =

Educational Foundation in Tamilnadu, India

- அகரம் அறக்கட்டளை
- Formation: 25 September 2006; 20 years ago
- Purpose: Financial assistance and education to the underprivileged
- Headquarters: Chennai, Tamil Nadu
- Owner: Suriya; Karthi
- Key people: Sivakumar
- Website: agaram.in

Agaram Foundation is an educational foundation located in Tamil Nadu, India founded on 25 September 2006 by Tamil film actor Suriya. The foundation aims to help and improve the socio-economic status of rural society in Tamil Nadu by offering education to underprivileged students.

== Activities ==
Sivakumar, father of Suriya and Karthi, used to provide financial assistance to students from rural areas through his Sivakumar Educational Trust from 1979.

In 2013, the foundation donated ₹1 million for the Uttarakhand disaster relief fund. In July 2017, Suriya and his family donated one of their family homes to the foundation. Suriya announced in 2018 that his team at Agaram Foundation had planned to renovate 400 government schools across Tamil Nadu. In 2020, the foundation provided funds to Tanjore government hospital to purchase medical equipment and beds during the COVID-19 pandemic. Agaram Foundation has provided scholarships for higher education to students from Sri Lanka, who lived in refugee camps located in Tamil Nadu.

== Project Vidhai ==
The foundation initiated a project named "Vidhai" (transl. Seed) to support the college education of underprivileged, meritorious, and socio-economically struggling students living in different parts of Tamil Nadu.

== Mentorship program ==
In 2018, Agaram foundation launched a book titled "Aram Seiya Virumbuvom" (transl. Let's learn to love virtue). Later, the second edition of the book was launched in February 2022.

In 2020, the foundation launched two more books titled Vidhyasam Thaan Azhagu (transl. Beauty lies in variance) and Ulagam Pirandhadhu Namakkaga (transl. The world originated for us) at a function. The foundation also provides a mentorship program called "Vazhikatigal" (transl. Torchbearers) for school children living in the remotest parts of Tamil Nadu.

In 2024, the foundation launched another book titled "Kadhaigalil Pesum Kuzhandaigal" (transl. Children who speak in stories).
