= Raavanan (2010 film) =

2010 Indian film by Mani Ratnam

- Theatrical release poster
- Directed by: Mani Ratnam
- Written by: Mani Ratnam
- Produced by: Mani Ratnam; Sharada Trilok
- Starring: Vikram; Aishwarya Rai Bachchan; Prithviraj
- Cinematography: Santosh Sivan; V. Manikandan
- Edited by: Sreekar Prasad
- Music by: A. R. Rahman
- Production company: Madras Talkies
- Distributed by: Reliance BIG Pictures
- Release date: 18 June 2010
- Running time: 134 minutes
- Country: India
- Language: Tamil

Raavanan is a 2010 Indian Tamil-language action-adventure film written, co-produced, and directed by Mani Ratnam. The film stars Vikram, Aishwarya Rai Bachchan and Prithviraj in the lead roles along with a supporting cast led by Karthik, Prabhu and Priyamani. It marked Rai Bachchan's return to Tamil after a decade, since Kandukondain Kandukondain (2000). The film follows the crux of the epic Ramayana, with a ruthless cop named Dev Prakash Subramaniam, who is on a quest to find a tribal leader-turned naxalite named Veeraiya as he had kidnapped his wife Raagini and begins to develop emotions for Veeraiya after learning his purpose.

Raavanan was announced in February 2008, amidst much hype of the celebrated director, Ratnam's return to Tamil films, whilst Vikram's and Rai Bachchan's casting creating more anticipation. Shooting began soon after, and took place in various locations with a record number of extras in areas including Chalakudy, Kerala and Ooty, Tamil Nadu amongst other regions throughout India. The film's music was composed by A. R. Rahman, the cinematography was handled by V. Manikandan and Santhosh Sivan, and editing done by A. Sreekar Prasad.

The film was also made simultaneously in Hindi as Raavan, with Abhishek Bachchan reprising Vikram's role and playing the antagonist, While Vikram reprising Prithviraj's role and playing the protagonist, and Rai Bachchan playing the same role in both films. The film was also dubbed in Telugu as Villain. All three versions were released simultaneously on 17 June 2010 worldwide.

It was later remade into Bengali in 2011 as Tiger Number One, starring Shakib Khan, Sahara and Amit Hasan.

== Plot ==
The film opens with a coordinated ambush by a tribal insurgent leader, Veeraiya "Veera," and his gang, who lure a police convoy into a fatal trap in the rural forests near Tirunelveli. Concurrently, Veera abducts Raagini, a classical dancer, during a boating excursion. Her husband, Dev Prakash Subramaniam, a ruthless and fiercely dedicated Superintendent of Police (SP), is immediately notified and mobilizes a massive tactical rescue operation. While state authorities classify Veera as a dangerous Naxalite outlaw, he functions as a localized folk hero, running a parallel administration with his brothers, Singarasu and Sakkarai, to protect his community from institutional exploitation.

Veera takes Raagini to a secluded cliffside hideout, intending to execute her in retaliation for an earlier state-sanctioned atrocity. Defiant, Raagini refuses to succumb to his execution and leaps off the towering cliff into a rushing river below. She survives the fall but is recaptured. Intrigued and unsettled by her absolute lack of fear regarding mortality, Veera holds off her execution, choosing instead to keep her as a high-value hostage. Dev leads a heavily armed tactical squad into the dense, untamed jungle, enlisting the assistance of Gnanaprakasam, a localized forest guard familiar with the terrain.

As the pursuit deepens, Raagini is exposed to the harsh realities of the tribal conflict and begins empathizing with her captor's motivations. She discovers that Veera’s vendetta stems from an extrajudicial raid Dev led against Veera's village during the wedding of his younger sister, Vennila. In the ensuing crossfire, Veera was shot in the neck and dragged to safety by his men, leaving the village unprotected. The police subsequently detained Vennila, subjecting her to brutal custodial torture and sexual assault to extract Veera's coordinates. Upon his return, Veera found a deeply traumatized Vennila, who committed suicide the following morning by drowning in a village well.

As the military blockade cuts off essential supplies, causing widespread distress among the tribal villagers, Sakkarai proposes a truce to Dev to prevent further bloodshed. Dev deceptively agrees to the negotiation, but when Sakkarai emerges from the jungle unarmed to finalize the terms, Dev executes him on the spot, openly prioritizing the total annihilation of Veera's network over the safety of his wife. Dev's betrayal enrages Veera and Singarasu, who launch a fierce counter-offensive that decimates the police camp. This culminates in a physical, high-stakes duel between Dev and Veera on a rickety rope bridge hanging over a deep gorge. Veera ultimately overpowers the SP, but chooses to spare his life out of respect for Raagini's honor.

Dev extricates himself and locates Raagini, whom Veera has left bound but unharmed at a designated extraction point. While traveling back to their hometown of Tiruchirappalli, Dev's repressed anger surfaces; he aggressively accuses Raagini of infidelity, falsely claiming that Veera boasted about a sexual encounter with her. Outraged by her husband's toxic distrust and realizing the implications, a furious Raagini leaves Dev. She tracks down Singarasu to arrange an immediate confrontation with Veera.

Upon meeting Veera in the jungle, she demands the truth regarding the allegation. Veera vehemently denies making the statement, and the duo instantly realizes that Dev fabricated the lie, knowing a betrayed Raagini would unwittingly lead police tracking units straight to Veera’s hidden sanctuary. Dev and a heavily armed police detail emerge from the foliage, surrounding them. Raagini desperately throws herself in front of Veera to shield him, but Veera pushes her out of the line of fire. Hit multiple times by a barrage of gunfire, a mortally wounded Veera stumbles toward the cliff's edge. Raagini frantically reaches out to catch him; though their hands fail to link, the desperate gesture confirms her care for him. Satisfied and smiling at her reciprocated affection, Veera falls backward off the cliff to his death.

== Cast ==
- Vikram as Veeraiya "Veera", a Naxalite in rural Tirunelveli. He is nicknamed Ravana since he is seen as a hero by locals but as a criminal by outsiders (character based on Ravana).
- Aishwarya Rai Bachchan as Ragini Subramaniam, Dev's wife who is kidnapped by Veera and kept in the jungle for 14 days. (voiceover by Rohini) (character based on Sita).
- Prithviraj as SP Dev Prakash Subramaniam IPS, who wants to shut down Veera's crime empire (character based on Rama).
- Karthik as Gnanaprakasam, a forest ranger who has worked in the jungle for 25 years and helps Dev find Veera's gang. He is a drunkard and enjoys joking around (character based on Hanuman).
- Prabhu as Singarasu, Veera's elder brother who supervises everything in the gang (character based on Kumbhakarna).
- Priyamani as Vennila, Veera's half-sister, who wants to marry Velan. On her wedding day, Veera was shot by Dev, and the police forcefully brings her to the police station, where she is brutally assaulted and eventually commits suicide, prompting the events of the film (character based on Shurpanakha).
- John Vijay as Hemanth Shankar, ACP aka DSP of Tirunelveli and the main perpetrator in Vennila's assault. He is Dev's trusted deputy (character based on Lakshmana).
- Munna as Sakkarai, Veera's younger brother, who is the only educated member of his brothers' gang and genuinely wants to stop the ongoing civil war and bring peace to the land (character based on Vibhishana) .
- Vaiyapuri as Raasathi, a transgender woman in the village (character based on Mohini).
- Ranjitha as Annam, Singgarasu's wife (character based on Vajramala).
- Varsha as Poonkodi
- Ashwanth Thilak as Velan, Vennila's lover, who left her at the altar out of fear of the police.
- Azhagam Perumal as the photographer who takes photos of Ragini
- Stanley as Padakotti
- Lakshmy Ramakrishnan as Velan's mother
- Elizabeth as Vennila's mother
- Saravana Subbiah as Ranjith, Veera's spy in Dev's gang (character based on Shuka and Sarana).
- Chaams as the wedding photographer

== Production ==
=== Development ===
During the making of his 2007 biopic Guru starring Abhishek Bachchan and Aishwarya Rai Bachchan, Mani Ratnam had finalised a script for his next directorial venture titled Lajjo. Based on a short story by Ismat Chughtai, it was a musical period film set in the desert and was to star Aamir Khan and Kareena Kapoor in the lead. Though the film was slated to go on floors after the release of the former, there were reports of a fall-out between Ratnam and Khan due to creative differences. While cinematographer P. C. Sreeram denied the reports, the film's would-be lyricist Gulzar said there were actually problems with acquiring the copyright of the story, and composer A. R. Rahman even confirmed to having completed 80% of the film score. Yet, the project was put on the back burner for reasons unknown.

Following the critical and commercial success of Guru, Ratnam announced his next film in February 2008. A modern-day retelling of the mythological epic Ramayana, the film again features the real life couple in the lead. The film was initially planned to be made only in Hindi and the idea for the Tamil version came later. In January 2009, while the film was in the making, it was further decided to dub the Tamil version to Telugu making it a tri-lingual. While the film was yet to be titled, it was widely reported in the media that the Tamil version was titled Ashokavanam in reference to the place where Sita was held captive by Ravana. Further reports emerged stating that since director Kasthuri Raja has already registered the title for his project, Ratnam has requested him for using the title. Later, Vikram, the lead actor, clarified in an interview that the film was tentatively titled Ravana but was wrongly reported as Ashokavanam. Subsequently, the film was titled Raavan in Hindi, Raavanan in Tamil and Villain in Telugu.

While the plot is inspired by Ramayana, the story is narrated from Ravana's perspective making him the protagonist. The film is centered on the 'Ashokavanam' episode where Ravana kidnaps Sita and keeps her in Asokavanam. Later Rama ventures to save his wife and bring her back.

=== Casting ===
While Bachchan and Vikram were roped in for the contrasting leads in Hindi, Ratnam asked them to swap roles in Tamil. Though Bachchan agreed initially, he grew sceptical being unfamiliar with the language. Eventually Prithviraj was cast in his place. Rai plays the female lead in both versions of the film. After a brief hiatus, Karthik made a comeback with this film, collaborating with Ratnam for the third time after Mouna Ragam and Agni Natchathiram. Prabhu was cast in a prominent role, joining hands with Ratnam after Agni Natchathiram and Anjali. While Priyamani was cast as Ravana's sister, Munna was signed up to play a role synonymous with Vibhishana. Bipasha Basu was to play the role of Mandodari, which was later scrapped to keep the film short. Likewise, singer Vidya Rao's role as the mother of Aishwarya Rai Bachchan's character was also cut from the final version. Comedian Vaiyapuri plays a transgender woman.

The cinematography was initially handled by V. Manikandan, but it was later taken over by Santosh Sivan, when the former left the project after multiple delays. The editing was done by Ratnam's regular, A. Sreekar Prasad, since Alaipayuthey. Rai's costumes were exclusively designed by fashion designer Sabyasachi Mukherjee. Choreography was by Ganesh Acharya, Brinda, Shobana, and Astad Deboo. Peter Hein and Shyam Kaushal choreographed the action sequences, while Samir Chanda took care of production design.

=== Filming ===
The film was predominantly shot outdoors in various hitherto unseen locations in and around India. Shooting took place at Tumkur (Karnataka), Orchha near Jhansi and the forests of Madhya Pradesh, Mahabaleshwar in Maharashtra. It was also reported that Ratnam had planned to shoot at Sri Lanka but decided against it owing to insurgency by the rebel group LTTE. But Ratnam dismissed the reports as rumours.

Principal photography commenced in October 2008, in the forests near Kochi, Kerala. A few scenes were filmed at Athirappilly Falls, Ratnam's favourite location. Incidentally, he has shot for the songs 'Jiya Jale' in Dil Se.. and 'Barso Re' in Guru at the same location. Forest officials banned the shooting at Malayattoor, an eco-tourism centre, for violating rules and constructing temporary huts, delaying the shoot for 11 days until the issues were resolved on 22 October 2008, while laying down reworked rules. The second leg of the shooting at Ooty that began in December 2008 was also delayed as local cab drivers protested the use of film federation (FEFSI) vehicles which affected their business, forcing a dejected Ratnam to call off the shoot temporarily and move on to Hogenakkal Falls. In February 2009, the crew advanced to Kolkata where the song 'Kalvare' was shot by the banks of Hooghly at Agarpara. Later, as the shooting resumed and progressed at Ooty, Ratnam fell ill in April 2009 and was hospitalised at Apollo Hospitals, causing a further delay of 47 days until filming resumed in June 2009 following his recovery. As the numerous delays affected his other projects, DOP Manikandan walked out in May and was replaced by Santosh Sivan. By July, the crew moved back to Kerala, to reshoot a few scenes at Chalakudy as Ratnam was reportedly unsatisfied after seeing the rushes. This time around, heavy rains played spoilsport leading to another delay in filming. Moreover, when an elephant brought for the shoot ran amok killing the mahout, the Animal Welfare Board served a show cause notice to the production company (Madras Talkies) for not taking permission to use elephants.

The film began its last schedule in August 2009 at the Malshej Ghats in Maharashtra where the climax sequence was shot, the final encounter taking place on a wooden bridge. Production designer Samir Chanda built three identical bridges to facilitate the scene to be captured from different angles. Though initially planned to be built either in Sri Lanka, Australia or South Africa, the bridge was constructed in Mumbai to reduce costs. While bad weather and heavy rains disrupted shoot for a few days, the forest department filed cases against some crew members for trespassing. The film went into post-production by the end of 2009.

Numerous action sequences were performed by the actors. The actors suffered from real cuts and bruises so they didn't need make up. For his introduction scene, the protagonist has to jump from a 90-foot high cliff near the Hogenakkal Falls into the river below. This risky dive was performed by a body double, Balram, a Bangalore based former national diving champion. Kalarippayattu, a martial art form originating from Kerala, was also featured in the film. Sunil Kumar, a Kalari gym trainer from Kozhikode, trained the actors. Contemporary dancer Astad Deboo choreographed a stunt scene for the film.

Vikram got his hair cropped short for his look and it was kept under wraps until the release. Supporting actor Munna tonsured his head and went bald for a scene. Rai was training in Tamil to voice her lines. While Ratnam was impressed with her Tamil and had planned to let her dub, actress Rohini, who had earlier dubbed for Rai in Iruvar and Guru, ended up lending her voice.

== Music ==
Mani Ratnam's norm composer A. R. Rahman, was roped in to compose the film's soundtrack, collaborating with actor Vikram after a gap of 16 years, since Pudhiya Mannargal (1994). The soundtrack album which was released by Sony Music on 28 May 2010, features six songs with lyrics penned by Vairamuthu, except for the song "Veera", which was penned by Mani Ratnam himself. The same soundtrack was used for the Hindi version of the film, titled Raavan, and the dubbed Telugu version of the film Villain, with the lyrics for the former was penned by Gulzar and the latter was penned by Veturi, which is his last work before his death in May 2010. While the audio rights of both Tamil and dubbed Telugu version was released by Sony Music, the Hindi version was released by T-Series. While the album has six songs in total, five additional songs, which were featured in the movie was released as a collectors's edition special pack on 10 November 2010.

== Release ==
=== Marketing ===
A 10 min teaser was released for a promo event. The film look was unveiled at Cannes Film Festival. Villain promotion in Andhra.

=== Film festival screenings ===
The film screened at 67th Venice Film Festival. The film was well received at Venice where the audience gave it a thunderous applause after it was screened. The master filmmaker was honoured with the Jaeger-LeCoultre Glory to the Filmmaker Award, an award shared by the likes of legends like Takeshi Kitano, Abbas Kiarostami and Sylvester Stallone. Later, the film has been screened at the 15th Busan International Film Festival. Indian Panorama Film Festival. The film was premiered at the 10th Annual Mahindra Indo-American Arts Council Film Festival in New York City. Jim Luce praised Mani Ratnam's work and mentioned 'Raavanan is a must see international film of 2010. 29th San Francisco Asian American Film Festival.

=== Theatrical release ===
Prior to its release, the film was given a "U" (Universal) certificate by the Central Board of Film Certification without cuts. Raavanan released in 375 screens worldwide. The overseas distribution rights of Raavanan was sold for a record price of $1.5 million to Ayngaran International. Raavanan was previewed at the Devi-Sri Devi Cinema Complex in Chennai, where it received a standing ovation by film personalities including Rajinikanth. The film was also previewed at INOX and was attended by celebrities from tinsel town. It was released worldwide on 18 June 2010, in 375 Screens (225 Screens in India and 150 Screens Overseas). 'The Telugu version Villain released with 215 screens in Andhra and 25 screens overseas. In the US, it was distributed by Big Cinemas. The satellite rights for the film were acquired by Raj TV for $1.1 million.

== Reception ==
=== Critical response ===
The film received mixed reviews. On the review aggregator website Rotten Tomatoes, 68% of 19 critics' reviews are positive, with an average rating of 6/10.

Malathi Rangarajan of The Hindu called Ravanan a "masterstroke". A. Srivathsan said that it was "Rai's most genuine performance till date". Deepak Kumaar's review. Hindustan Times review. The CNN-IBN stated that "The film is certainly not the best from Mani Ratnam's Madras Talkies, but it can't be dismissed as shabby. Even if this Raavanan has no shades of grey, overall the film falls under the greyish form of art from Mani Ratnam enterprises, and Aishwarya Rai Bachchan plays the strong woman who does not fear her kidnapper. Her performance is worth a mention but her male co-stars steal the show". IANS praises Mani Ratnam's style, but calls some of the performances "inadequate". Twitch Film review. Madurai Messenger review. Rai's performance was also noted as a highlight of the film according to Rediff, with her performance placing her in a "different league" than other Bollywood actresses. Indiaglitz praised the music, cast, dialogues and cinematography, but stated that the first half was "an utter waste of film reels". The cinematography was called "brilliant" by Behindwoods, although they found a "lack of 'Tamil' feel in the film and its music". Sify rated the film as above average and noted "the film's best-written role, Aishwarya Rai has made a sensational comeback as Ragini, is mesmeric and has come out with an award-winning performance. Prithviraj is the ideal foil for Vikram, and is good. The movie lacks the Mani Ratnam touch in the story and screenplay department, and has a wobbly first half, where the story just does not move. The last 10 minutes are the best part of this 2 hours 7 minutes film". Film critic Sudhish Kamath review.

The Tamil version was regarded as the better version of the film in comparison to the Hindi version Raavan, with critics particularly applauding the lead performances and the technical work of the film.

=== Box office ===
Unlike its Hindi counterpart, which tanked at the box office, the Tamil version tasted success in the South. During its opening weekend on 15 screens in Chennai, it was the number one film and netted ₹9 million (US$96,000), an opening weekend record then. Though the film opened to packed houses, it slumped a little due to mixed reviews but later picked up following a local holiday. The film collected $8 million at the box office in the first month of release including $400,000 from Kerala. It went on to make over ₹ 600 million at the worldwide box office and remained one of the top Tamil grossers of the year. Uk opening weekend. UK boxoffice second week. New York boxoffice.

== Controversy ==
It was agreed the film would be screened in Bangalore across 21 screens. When both the versions were screened in more centres, the Karnataka Film Chamber of Commerce (KFCC) approached the court. The film chamber banned the exhibition completely. The Competition Commission of India (CCI), in an interim order, stayed the chamber ban and permitted Reliance Big Entertainment Limited (RBEL) to exhibit the film in 36 cinemas. This order was to be in effect till 22 June 2010.

The film also created a furore in Sri Lanka. Since Amitabh Bachchan, Abhishek and Aishwarya boycotted (protests against the Sri Lankan Civil War) the IIFA awards that was held in Sri Lanka, the film release was protested and theatres were torched. Films of those who attended IIFA in Sri Lanka were banned in Tamil Nadu.

== Accolades ==
Raavanan was one among the films shortlisted for India's submission to the Academy Awards. V. Manikandan was nominated for Best Cinematography award in the Asia Pacific Screen Awards (APSA). The film was praised by Indian politician Muthuvel Karunanidhi. The film was added to the Austrian Film Museum. Peter Heins was nominated at the World Stunt Awards.

58th Filmfare Awards South

- Won – Filmfare Best Actor Award – Vikram
- Won – Filmfare Best Male Playback Singer – Karthik
- Nominated – Filmfare Best Supporting Actor Award – Prithviraj

5th Vijay Awards

- Won – Best Actor Award – Vikram
- Nominated – Best Actress Award – Aishwarya Rai Bachchan
- Nominated – Best Cinematographer – Santhosh Sivan
- Nominated – Best Male Playback Singer – Karthik
- Nominated – Best Female Playback Singer – Anuradha Sriram
- Nominated – Best Female Playback Singer – Shreya Ghoshal
- Nominated – Favorite Director – Mani Ratnam
- Nominated – Favorite Actress – Aishwarya Rai Bachchan

Tamil Nadu State Film Awards

- Won – Best Actor Award – Vikram
