= Vijay Award for Best Female Playback Singer =

Indian film award

The Vijay Award for Best Female Playback Singer is given by STAR Vijay as part of its annual Vijay Awards ceremony for recognise excellence in Tamil (Kollywood) films. The award for this category was first given in 2007.

== Superlatives ==
Most Wins

- Chinmayi Sripaada (2 wins - 2009 and 2011)

Most nominations

- Shreya Ghoshal (9 nominations)

== The List ==
Here is a list of the award winners and the films for which they won.

Year	Singer	Song	Film	Link
2017	Luksimi Sivaneswaralingam	"Senthoora"	Bogan	
2014	Uthara Unnikrishnan	"Nadhi Pogum"	Pisaasu	
2013	Shakthisree Gopalan	"Nenjukulle"	Kadal	
2012	Ramya NSK	"Sattru Munbu"	Neethane En Ponvasantham	
2011	Chinmayi	"Sara Sara"	Vaagai Sooda Vaa	
2010	Shreya Ghoshal	"Mannipaaya"	Vinnaithaandi Varuvaayaa	
2009	Chinmayi	"Vaarayo Vaarayo"	Aadhavan	
2008	Bombay Jayashree	"Sakiyae"	Dhaam Dhoom	
2007	Neha Bhasin	"Pesugiren"	Satham Podathey	

== Nominations ==
- 2007 Neha Bhasin - "Pesugiren" (Satham Podathey)
  - Shreya Ghoshal - "Nannare"(Guru)
  - Chinmayi - "Sahana" (Sivaji)
  - Madhumitha - "Valayapatti Thavile" (Azhagiya Tamil Magan)
  - Sadhana Sargam - "Akkam Pakkam" (Kireedam)
  - Sowmya Raoh - "Un Sirippinil" (Pachaikili Muthucharam)
- 2008 Bombay Jayashree - "Sakiye" (Dhaam Dhoom)
  - Sadhana Sargam - "Enadhuyire" (Bheema)
  - Shreya Ghoshal - "Thaen Thaen Thaen" (Kuruvi)
  - Sudha Raghunathan - "Annal Maelae" (Vaaranam Aayiram)
  - Swetha Mohan - "Kandaen Kandaen" (Pirivom Santhippom)
- 2009 Chinmayi - "Vaarayo Vaarayo" (Aadhavan)
  - Bombay Jayashree - "Vizhigalile" (Renigunta)
  - Janaki Iyer - "Azhagaai Pookkuthey" (Ninaithale Inikkum)
  - Rita - "Allegra" (Kanthaswamy)
  - Shreya Ghoshal - "Oru Vetkam Varudhe" (Pasanga)
  - Shreya Ghoshal - "Poovinai Thirandhu" (Ananda Thandavam)
- 2010 Shreya Ghoshal - "Mannipaaya" (Vinnaithaandi Varuvaaya)
  - Shreya Ghoshal - "Kadhal Anukkal" (Enthiran)
  - Shreya Ghoshal - "Un Perai Sollum Pothe" (Angadi Theru)
  - Chinmayi - "Kilimanjaro" (Enthiran)
  - Harini - "Pookal Pookum" (Madarasapattinam)
  - Andrea Jeremiah - "Idhu Varai" (Goa)
  - Shreya Ghoshal - "Kalvare" (Raavanan)
  - Anuradha Sriram - "Kaattu Sirukki" (Raavanan)
- 2011 Chinmayi - "Sara Sara" (Vaagai Sooda Vaa)
  - Prashanthini - "Ayyayo" (Aadukalam)
  - Saindhavi - "Pirai Thedum" (Mayakkam Enna)
  - Suzanne D'Mello - "Mazhai Varum" (Veppam)
  - Shweta Mohan - "Nee Koorinal" (180)
- 2012 Ramya NSK - "Satru Munbu" (Neethaane En Ponvasantham)
  - Shruti Haasan - "Kannazhaga" (3)
  - Shweta Pandit - "Idhayam" (Billa II)
  - Sithara - "Kangal Neeye" (Muppozhudhum Un Karpanaigal)
  - Sunidhi Chauhan - "Mudhal Murai" (Neethaane En Ponvasantham)
- 2013 Shakthisree Gopalan - "Nenjukulle" (Kadal)
  - Andrea Jeremiah - "Mama Douser" (Soodhu Kavvum)
  - Harini - "Moongil Thottam" (Kadal)
  - Shweta Mohan - "Innum Konjam" (Maryan)
  - Vandana Srinivasan - "Avatha Paiyya" (Paradesi)
- 2014 Uthara Unnikrishnan - "Nadhi Pogum Koozhangal" (Pisaasu)
  - Chinmayi - "Idhayam" (Kochadaiiyaan)
  - Shreya Ghoshal - "Kandangi Kandangi" (Jilla)
  - Shakthisree Gopalan, Dhee - "Naan Nee" (Madras)
  - Vaikom Vijayalakshmi - "Pudhiya Ulagai" (Yennamo Yedho)

== See also ==
- Tamil cinema
- Cinema of India
