= Vijay Award for Icon of the Year =

Indian film award

The Vijay Award for Icon of the Year is a discontinued award that used to be given by STAR Vijay as part of its annual Vijay Awards ceremony for Tamil (Kollywood) films. This category has been retired since 2007.

== The list ==
Here is a list of the award winners and the films for which they won.

Year	Actor	Link
2006	Vikram	
2007	Vijay	
2008	Suriya	

== See also ==
- Tamil cinema
- Cinema of India
