= Vijay Awards =

Tamil film awards

- Awarded for: Excellence in cinematic achievements in Tamil cinema
- Country: India
- Presented by: STAR Vijay
- First award: 2006

The Vijay Awards were presented by the Tamil television channel STAR Vijay to honour excellence in Tamil cinema. They were given annually from 2006 until 2018, with the 10th and last edition being held in May 2018. The awards were decided by a jury, consisting of noted film-makers, critics and technicians, while winners in a separate category named "Favourite awards" were chosen by public voting. The awards were sponsored by Reliance Mobile, Univercell and Close Up. After the 10th Vijay Awards in 2018, the Vijay Awards were cancelled due to past controversies and waning public interest.

== History ==
The first edition of the awards was held to select the most popular artists, however not for any particular work or year. In the first year of the awards, viewers were asked to choose their all-time favourite film and artists in nine categories - Favourite Hero, Heroine, Film, Director, Music Director, Playback Singer Male/Female, Villain and Comedian - while 10 Jury Special Awards were also introduced. The format was completely reworked for the following year and from 2008 onwards, the works of the preceding year were honoured, with the majority of prizes being selected by a committee, while awards in five categories (Favourite Hero, Heroine, Film, Director and Song) chosen by public voting. The award for Favourite Song was introduced in 2008.

== Awards ==
=== Jury Awards ===
- Best Film
- Best Director
- Best Actor
- Best Actress
- Best Supporting Actor
- Best Supporting Actress
- Best Comedian
- Best Villain
- Best Debut Actor
- Best Debut Actress
- Best Music Director
- Best Cinematographer
- Best Editor
- Best Art Director
- Best Male Playback Singer
- Best Female Playback Singer
- Best Lyricist
- Best Dialogue Writer
- Best Story, Screenplay Writer
- Best Choreographer
- Best Stunt Director
- Best Make Up
- Best Costume Designer
- Best Find of the Year
- Best Crew
- Contribution to Tamil Cinema
- Vijay Award for Entertainer of the Year
- Chevalier Sivaji Ganesan Award for Excellence in Indian Cinema
- Vijay Special Jury Award

=== Favourite awards ===
- Favourite Hero
- Favourite Heroine
- Favourite Film
- Favourite Director
- Favourite Song
- Favourite Music Director (2006 only)
  - A R Rahman
- Favourite Villain (2006 only)
  - Prakash Raj
- Favourite Comedian (2006 only)
  - Vivek
- Favourite Playback Singer (Male) (2006 only)
  - S. P. Balasubrahmanyam
- Favourite Playback Singer (Female) (2006 only)
  - S Janaki
- Vijay Award for Icon of the Year
  - Vijay (2007)
  - Vikram (2006)

== Ceremony ==
The ceremony is held every year at the Jawaharlal Nehru Indoor Stadium in Chennai and is telecasted on STAR Vijay only. However, it is not televised live. Except for the first edition, the ceremonies are held in May, June or July, though always before the announcement of the Filmfare Awards South.

| Ceremony | Date | Host(s) | Sponsor(s) |
|---|---|---|---|
| 1st Vijay Awards | 23 December 2006 | Yugi Sethu | Reliance Mobile |
| 2nd Vijay Awards | 3 May 2008 | Yugi Sethu | Reliance Mobile |
| 3rd Vijay Awards | 13 June 2009 | C Gopinath | Univercell |
| 4th Vijay Awards | 29 May 2010 | C Gopinath | Univercell |
| 5th Vijay Awards | 25 June 2011 | C Gopinath and Sivakarthikeyan | Close-Up |
| 6th Vijay Awards | 16 June 2012 | C Gopinath and Sivakarthikeyan | Close-Up |
| 7th Vijay Awards | 11 May 2013 | C Gopinath and R Madhavan | Close-Up |
| 8th Vijay Awards | 5 July 2014 | C Gopinath and Divyadharshini | Gionee |
| 9th Vijay Awards | 25 April 2015 | C Gopinath and Divyadharshini | Poorvika |
| 10th Vijay Awards | 25 May 2018 | C Gopinath and Divyadharshini | Poorvika |

== Superlatives ==
Most Awards to a Single person

- Vijay - 9
- Kamal Haasan - 8
- Dhanush - 7
- Nayanthara - 6

Most Awards to a Single person in a single year

- Kamal Haasan - 5 (3rd Vijay Awards)

Most Awards to a Single film

- Vaaranam Aayiram - 7
- Thuppakki - 6
- Dasavatharam - 6
- Kadal - 6

Most Nominations to a Single person

- Dhanush - 23
- Suriya - 15
- Harris Jayaraj - 15
- Vijay - 14
- Yuvan Shankar Raja - 10

Most Nominations to a Single film

- Aadukalam - 22
- Thuppakki - 16
- Vaaranam Aayiram - 15
- Vinnaithaandi Varuvaayaa - 15
- Raja Rani - 15

== See also ==
- Tamil cinema
- Cinema of India
