= Vijay Award for Best Supporting Actor =

Indian film award

The Vijay Award for Best Supporting Actor is given by Star Vijay as part of its annual Vijay Awards ceremony for Tamil (Kollywood) films.

== The list ==
Here is a list of the award winners and the films for which they won.

Year	Actor	Film	Link
2007	Prakash Raj	Mozhi	
2008	V. R. Ramesh	Anjathey	
2009	Jayaprakash	Pasanga	
2010	Thambi Ramaiah	Mynaa	
2011	R. Sarathkumar	Muni 2: Kanchana	
2012	Sathyaraj	Nanban	
2013	Bharathiraja	Pandianadu	
2014	Kalaiyarasan	Madras	
2017	Vivek Prasanna	Meyaadha Maan	

== Nominations ==
- 2007 Prakash Raj - Mozhi
  - M. S. Bhaskar - Mozhi
  - Murali - Polladhavan
  - Rajkiran - Kireedam
  - Saravanan - Paruthiveeran
- 2008 Ajmal Ameer - Anjathey
  - Kumaravel - Abhiyum Naanum
  - Prakash Raj - Abhiyum Naanum
  - Sasikumar - Subramaniyapuram
- 2009 Jayaprakash - Pasanga
  - Bharani - Naadodigal
  - Jegan - Ayan
  - Krishnamoorthy - Naan Kadavul
  - Mohanlal - Unnaipol Oruvan
- 2010 Thambi Ramaiah - Mynaa
  - Ganesh - Vinnaithaandi Varuvaayaa
  - Madhavan - Manmadan Ambu
  - Parthiban - Aayirathil Oruvan
  - Sampath Raj - Goa
- 2011 R. Sarathkumar - Muni 2: Kanchana
  - Appukutty - Azhagarsamiyin Kuthirai
  - Ajmal Ameer - Ko
  - G. M. Kumar - Avan Ivan
  - Guru Somasundaram - Aaranya Kaandam
- 2012 Sathyaraj - Nanban
  - Marimuthu - Aarohanam
  - Naren - Sundarapandian
  - Pasupathi - Aravaan
  - Samuthirakani - Saattai
- 2013 Bharathiraja - Pandiya Naadu
  - Arvind Swamy - Kadal
  - Karunakaran - Soodhu Kavvum
  - Sathyaraj - Raja Rani
  - Simha - Neram
- 2014 Kalaiyarasan - Madras
  - Guru Somasundaram - Jigarthanda
  - Radharavi - Pisaasu
  - Rajkiran - Manjapai
  - Samuthirakani - Velaiyilla Pattathari

== See also ==
- Tamil cinema
- Cinema of India
