= Vijay Award for Contribution to Tamil Cinema =

Indian film award

The Vijay Award for Contribution to Tamil Cinema is given by the STAR Vijay TV channel as part of its annual Vijay Awards ceremony for Tamil films.

== The list ==
Here is a list of the award winners and the films for which they won.

Year	Awardee	Link
2018	Sivakumar	
2015	AVM Saravanan	
2013	Balu Mahendra	
2012	Bharathiraja	
2010	Mugur Sundar	
2009	The Stunt Union	
2008	Sathyam Cinemas	
2007	Film News Anandan	
2006	Saroja Devi	

== See also ==
- Tamil cinema
- Cinema of India
