= Chevalier Sivaji Ganesan Award for Excellence in Indian Cinema =

Award for excellence in Indian Cinema by STAR Vijay

The Chevalier Sivaji Ganesan Award for Excellence in Indian Cinema is given by Indian TV channel Star Vijay as part of its annual Vijay Awards ceremony for excellence in Indian Cinema.

== The list ==
Here is a list of the award winners and the films for which they won.

Year	Awardee	Link
2007	Kamal Haasan	
2008	Mani Ratnam	
2009	A. R. Rahman	
2010	Rajinikanth	
2011	K. Balachander	
2012	S. P. Balasubrahmanyam	
2013	Shah Rukh Khan	
2014	Shankar	
2015	Ilayaraja	

== See also ==
- Tamil cinema
- Cinema of India
