= Vijay Award for Best Story, Screenplay Writer =

Award category

The Vijay Award for Best Story, Screenplay Writer is given by Tamil-language TV channel STAR Vijay as part of its annual Vijay Awards ceremony for Tamil (Kollywood) films.

== The list ==
Here is a list of the award winners and the films for which they won.

Year	Writer	Film	Link
2017	Pushkar-Gayathri	Vikram Vedha	
2014	Vijay Milton	Goli Soda	
2013	Nalan Kumarasamy	Soodhu Kavvum	
2012	Karthik Subbaraj	Pizza	
2011	Thiagarajan Kumararaja	Aaranya Kaandam	
2010	Prabhu Solomon	Mynaa	
2009	Arivazhagan Venkatachalam	Eeram	
2008	Kamal Haasan	Dasavathaaram	
2007	Viji	Mozhi	

== Nominations ==
- 2007 Viji - Mozhi
  - Ameer Sultan - Paruthiveeran
  - Madhavan and Seeman - Evano Oruvan
  - Ram - Katrathu Tamil
  - Venkat Prabhu - Chennai 600028
- 2008 Kamal Haasan - Dasavathaaram
  - Gautham Vasudev Menon - Vaaranam Aayiram
  - Mysskin - Anjathey
  - Sasikumar - Subramaniapuram
- 2009 Arivazhagan Venkatachalam - Eeram
  - Jayamohan and Bala - Naan Kadavul
  - Pandiraj - Pasanga
  - Samudrakani - Naadodigal
  - Vikram Kumar - Yaavarum Nalam
- 2010 Prabhu Solomon - Mynaa
  - Gautham Vasudev Menon - Vinnaithaandi Varuvaayaa
  - Sargunam - Kalavani
  - Suseenthiran and Bhaskar Sakthi - Naan Mahaan Alla
  - Vasanthabalan and Jayamohan - Angadi Theru
- 2011 Thiagarajan Kumararaja - Aaranya Kaandam
  - K. V. Anand and Subha - Ko
  - M. Saravanan - Engaeyum Eppothum
  - Raghava Lawrence - Kanchana
  - Vetrimaaran - Aadukalam
- 2012 Karthik Subbaraj - Pizza
  - Balaji Sakthivel - Vazhakku Enn 18/9
  - Balaji Tharaneetharan - Naduvula Konjam Pakkatha Kaanom
  - Rajesh - Oru Kal Oru Kannadi
  - S. S. Rajamouli - Naan Ee
- 2013 Nalan Kumarasamy - Soodhu Kavvum
  - Alphonse Putharen - Neram
  - Atlee - Raja Rani
  - Lenin Bharathi, Suseenthiran - Aadhalal Kadhal Seiveer
  - Naveen - Moodar Koodam
- 2014 Vijay Milton - Goli Soda
  - Karthik Subbaraj - Jigarthanda
  - R. Parthiepan - Kathai Thiraikathai Vasanam Iyakkam
  - Ram - Mundasupatti
  - Velraj - Velaiyilla Pattathari
- 2017 Pushkar–Gayathri – Vikram Vedha
  - A. R. K. Sarvan – Maragadha Naanayam
  - Arun Prabu Purushothaman – Aruvi
  - H. Vinoth – Theeran Adhigaram Ondru
  - Lokesh Kanagaraj – Maanagaram

== See also ==
- Tamil cinema
- Cinema of India
