= Vijay Award for Best Music Director =

Award category

The Vijay Award for Best Music Director is given by the Indian TV channel STAR Vijay as part of its annual Vijay Awards ceremony for Tamil (Kollywood) films.

== The list ==
Here is a list of the award winners and the films for which they won.

Year	Music director	Film	Link
2017	A. R. Rahman	Kaatru Veliyidai	
2014	Anirudh Ravichander	Velaiyilla Pattathari	
2013	A. R. Rahman	Kadal	
2012	D. Imman	Kumki	
2011	G. V. Prakash Kumar	Aadukalam	
2010	A. R. Rahman	Vinnaithaandi Varuvaayaa	
2009	Harris Jayaraj	Aadhavan	
2008	Harris Jayaraj	Vaaranam Aayiram	
2007	A. R. Rahman	Sivaji	

== Nominations ==
- 2007 A. R. Rahman - Sivaji
  - G. V. Prakash Kumar - Kireedam
  - Harris Jayaraj - Unnale Unnale
  - Vidyasagar - Mozhi
  - Yuvan Shankar Raja - Paruthiveeran
- 2008 Harris Jayaraj - Vaaranam Aayiram
  - A. R. Rahman - Sakkarakatti
  - James Vasanthan - Subramaniapuram
  - Yuvan Shankar Raja - Saroja
- 2009 Harris Jayaraj - Aadhavan
  - Devi Sri Prasad - Kanthaswamy
  - Ilaiyaraaja - Naan Kadavul
  - Vijay Antony - TN 07 AL 4777
  - Yuvan Shankar Raja - Siva Manasula Sakthi
- 2010 A. R. Rahman - Vinnaithaandi Varuvaayaa
  - D. Imman - Mynaa
  - G. V. Prakash Kumar - Madrasapattinam
  - Ilaiyaraaja - Nandalala
  - Rahnananthan - Thenmerku Paruvakaatru
  - Yuvan Shankar Raja - Paiyaa
- 2011 G. V. Prakash Kumar - Aadukalam
  - C. Sathya - Engaeyum Eppothum
  - Harris Jayaraj - Engeyum Kadhal
  - Sharreth - Nootrenbadhu
  - Ghibran - Vaagai Sooda Vaa
- 2012 D Imman - Kumki
  - Anirudh Ravichander - 3
  - Harris Jayaraj - Nanban
  - Ilaiyaraja - Neethaane En Ponvasantham
  - Yuvan Shankar Raja - Kazhugu
- 2013 A. R. Rahman - Kadal
  - Anirudh Ravichander - Ethir Neechal
  - D Imman - Varuthapadatha Valibar Sangam
  - G. V. Prakash Kumar - Raja Rani
  - Santhosh Narayanan - Soodhu Kavvum
- 2014 Anirudh Ravichander - Velaiyilla Pattathari
  - A. R. Rahman - Kochadaiiyaan
  - D. Imman - Jilla
  - Santhosh Narayanan - Cuckoo
  - Yuvan Shankar Raja - Anjaan

== See also ==
- Tamil cinema
- Cinema of India
