= Vijay Award for Best Lyricist =

Award category

The Vijay Award for Best Lyricist is given by STAR Vijay as part of its annual Vijay Awards ceremony for Tamil (Kollywood) films.

== The list ==
This is a list of the award recipients and the films for which they won.

Year	Poet	Song	Film	Link
2017	Umadevi	"Thoranam Aayiram"	Aramm	
2014	Kabilan	"Aathangara Orathil"	Yaan	
2013	Na. Muthukumar	"Dheivangal Ellam"	Kedi Billa Killadi Ranga	
2012	Thamarai	"Kangal Neeye"	Muppozhudhum Un Karpanaigal	
2011	Vairamuthu	"Sara Sara"	Vaagai Sooda Vaa	
2010	Vairamuthu	"Arima Arima" & "Kalli Kaatil"	Thenmerku Paruvakaatru	
2009	Na. Muthukumar	"Oru Kal Oru Kannadi"	Siva Manasula Sakthi	
2008	Thamarai	"Nenjukkul Peidhidhum"	Vaaranam Aayiram	
2007	Na. Muthukumar	"Balleilakka"	Sivaji	

== Nominations ==
- 2007 Na. Muthukumar - "Balleilakka" (Sivaji)
  - Rohini - "Unnakul Naane" (Pachaikili Muthucharam)
  - Snehan - "Ariyaatha Vayasu" (Paruthiveeran)
  - Vaali - "Yaaro" (Chennai 600028)
  - Vairamuthu - "Kaatrin Mozhi" (Mozhi)
- 2008 Thamarai - "Nenjukkul Peidhidhum" (Vaaranam Aayiram)
  - Na. Muthukumar - "Mudhal Mazhai" (Bheema)
  - Vaali - "Kallai Mattum" (Dasavathaaram)
  - Vairamuthu - "Vaa Vaa" (Abhiyum Naanum)
- 2009 Na. Muthukumar - "Oru Kal Oru Kannadi" (Siva Manasula Sakthi)
  - Ilayaraaja - "Pitchai Paathiram" (Naan Kadavul)
  - Kabilan - "Karikalan" (Vettaikaaran)
  - Thamarai - "Oru Vetkam Varudhe" (Pasanga)
  - Vairamuthu - "Nenje Nenje" (Ayan)
- 2010 Vairamuthu - "Arima Arima" & "Kallikaatil" (Enthiran / Thenmerku Paruvakaatru)
  - Gangai Amaran - "Idhu Varai" (Goa)
  - Na. Muthukumar - "Aval Appadi Ondrum" (Angadi Theru)
  - Thamarai - "Mannipaaya" (Vinnaithaandi Varuvaayaa)
  - Yugabharathi - "Mynaa Mynaa" (Mynaa)
- 2011 Vairamuthu - "Sara Sara" (Vaagai Sooda Vaa)
  - Dhanush - "Voda Voda" (Mayakkam Enna)
  - Madhan Karky - "Enamo Aedho" (Ko)
  - Na. Muthukumar - "Aariro" (Deiva Thirumagal)
  - Snehan - "Yathe Yathe" (Aadukalam)
- 2012 Thamarai - "Kangal Neeye" (Muppozhudhum Un Karpanaigal)
  - Dhanush - "Po Nee Po" (3)
  - Gaana Bala - "Nadukadalula" (Attakathi)
  - Na. Muthukumar - "Oru Paadhi" (Thaandavam)
  - Yugabharathi - "Sollitalae" (Kumki)
- 2013 Na. Muthukumar - "Dheivangal Ellam" (Kedi Billa Killadi Ranga)
  - Kabilan, A. R. Rahman - "Innum Konja Neram" (Maryan)
  - Madhan Karky - "Mannadacha Pandhu" (Gouravam)
  - Vaali - "Ethir Neechal Adi" (Ethir Neechal)
  - Vairamuthu - "Nenjukkule" (Kadal)
- 2014 Kabilan - "Aathangara Orathil" (Yaan)
  - Dhanush - "Amma Amma" (Velaiyilla Pattathari)
  - Na. Muthukumar - "Azhagu" (Saivam)
  - Vairamuthu - "Maatram Ondru" (Kochadaiiyaan)
  - Yugabharathi - "Manasula Soora Kaathu" (Cuckoo)

== See also ==
- Tamil cinema
- Cinema of India
