= Vijay Award for Best Actor =

Indian film award

The Vijay Award for Best Actor is given by STAR Vijay as part of its annual Vijay Awards ceremony for Tamil (Kollywood) films. The award for this category was given from the second ceremony onwards. Dhanush and Vikram are the most award winners with 2 awards each.

== Winners and nominees ==
- 2007:Sathyaraj - Onbadhu Roobai Nottu
  - Dhanush - Polladhavan
  - Jiiva - Katrathu Tamil
  - Vijay - Pokkiri
  - Sathyaraj - Periyar
- 2008: Suriya - Vaaranam Aayiram
  - Dhanush - Yaaradi Nee Mohini
  - Jayam Ravi - Santosh Subramaniam
  - Kamal Haasan - Dasavathaaram
- 2009: Prakash Raj - Kanchivaram
  - Arya - Naan Kadavul
  - Jayam Ravi - Peraanmai
  - Kamal Haasan - Unnaipol Oruvan
  - Vijay - Villu
- 2010: Vikram - Raavanan
  - Arya - Madrasapattinam
  - Karthi - Naan Mahaan Alla
  - Silambarasan - Vinnaithaandi Varuvaayaa
  - Suriya - Raththa Sarithiram
- 2011: Vikram - Deiva Thirumagal
  - Vijay - Velayudham
  - Jiiva - Ko
  - Suriya - 7 Aum Arivu
  - Vishal - Avan Ivan
- 2012: Dhanush - 3
  - Suriya - Maattraan
  - Vijay - Thuppakki
  - Vijay Sethupathi - Naduvula Konjam Pakkatha Kaanom
- 2013: Kamal Haasan - Vishwaroopam
  - Vishal - Pandiya Naadu
  - Atharvaa - Paradesi
  - Vijay - Thalaiva
  - Vijay Sethupathi - Soodhu Kavvum
- 2014: Dhanush - Velaiyilla Pattathari
  - Vijay - Kaththi
  - Siddharth - Kaaviya Thalaivan
  - Karthi - Madras
  - Dinesh - Cuckoo
- 2017: Vijay Sethupathi - Vikram Vedha
  - Vijay - Mersal
  - Karthi - Theeran Adhigaaram Ondru
  - Vijay - Bairavaa
  - Vishal - Thupparivaalan

== See also ==
- Tamil cinema
- Cinema of India
