= Mugamoodi (soundtrack) =

- Album cover

Soundtrack album by K
- Released: 1 August 2012
- Recorded: 2011–2012
- Studios: Kalasa Studio, Chennai; Aura Studios, Chennai; Marian Digital Recording Studio, Kochi; AM Studios, Chennai; Groove Planet, Chennai
- Genre: Feature film soundtrack
- Length: 40:59
- Language: Tamil
- Labels: UTV Music; Saregama
- Producer: K

K chronology
Yuddham Sei (2011)	Mugamoodi (2012)	Aarohanam (2012)

Mugamoodi is the soundtrack album composed by K for the 2012 Tamil-language superhero film of the same name starring Jiiva and Pooja Hegde in lead roles, directed by Mysskin. The film marks K's second collaboration with Mysskin after Yuddham Sei (2011). The album consists of four songs with seven theme scores. Lyrics were penned by Madhan Karky, and Mysskin himself. The soundtrack album was released by UTV Music and Saregama on 1 August 2012. The release coincided with a promotional event held at the Sathyam Cinemas, Chennai. The album also was dubbed and released in Telugu as Mask on 15 August 2012, by Aditya Music.

The album received positive reviews from critics, praising K's composition, and lyrics. The tracks "Vaayamoodi Summa Iru Da" and "Maayavi", topped the charts and FM stations.

== Background ==
In July 2011, K, who previously collaborated with Mysskin in his debut film Yuddham Sei (2011) was signed to compose music for Mugamoodi. K said that he was elated when Mysskin offered him Mugamoodi. Madhan Karky, and Mysskin himself penned the lyrics of the Tamil songs. The Telugu songs were written by Vanamali, Bhuvana Chandra, and Rakendu Mouli.

== Production and composition ==
Shortly after his involvement, K recorded a romantic melody ("Vaayamoodi Summa Iru Da") with the lyrics of Karky. It was his 41st song as a lyricist. By early February 2012, K completed recording three songs for the film, adding that the film would feature four songs. According to Karky, "usually Mysskin's films have fast numbers, but here, for a change, there are two melodies and I have penned them both." Karky revealed that he wrote lyrics for "Vaayamoodi Summa Iru Da" on a flight.

Unlike Mysskin's previous films, the film would not feature a "yellow saree song" as it was a superhero film. Hence, a kuthu song was shot at a TASMAC bar entitled "Bar Anthem" which K described it as "a Kuthu song with soul". Mysskin revealed that Kabilan was the first choice to write "Bar Anthem" but could not do so citing schedule conflicts. Karky could not write the song as he never consumed alcohol. This resulted in Mysskin writing the lyrics for the song. K incorporated the violin portions of the song from the titular track from Annakili (1976) composed by Ilaiyaraaja.

== Release ==
The tracklist was officially released by the makers on 30 July 2012. The audio launch event was held on 1 August 2012 at Sathyam Cinemas, Chennai. The audio was presented by Vijay and was received by Puneeth Rajkumar. Mysskin, Jiiva, Pooja Hegde, Narain, Lingusamy, Venkat Prabhu, Gnanavel Raja, Jayam Raja, Madhan Karky, Ravi K Chandran, and R. B. Choudary were also present at the event. An online contest was conducted by UTV to which 500 winners of the contest, had received the audio launch invitation through e-mail. CDs were made available in stores on the same day.

On 15 August 2012, the audio launch of film film's Telugu version titled Mask was held. The event was held at Annapurna Studios, Hyderabad. Along with film's cast and crew, VV Vinayak, Gemini Kiran, Shyam Prasad Reddy, Ramesh Puppala, K. Atchi Reddy, Sunil, B. V. S. N. Prasad, R. B. Choudary, and Bhimaneni Srinivasa Rao were also present at the audio launch.

== Track listing ==
Mugamoodi (Tamil)
No.	Title	Lyrics	Singer(s)	Length
1.	"Vaayamoodi Summa Iru Da" (Strings)	Madhan Karky	Aalap Raju	4:33
2.	"Lullaby For Loss"			2:32
3.	"Bar Anthem"	Mysskin	Mysskin	5:11
4.	"Blue Panther on the Prowl"			1:37
5.	"Maayavi"	Madhan Karky	Chinmayi	4:30
6.	"Dont Drive Your Car With This Music On" (Theme)			4:43
7.	"Vaayamoodi Summa Iru Da" (Guitar)	Madhan Karky	Aalap Raju	4:35
8.	"Cape Of Good Hope" (Theme)			2:44
9.	"Hell, Heaven And The Ladder" (Theme)			1:40
10.	"Come Lets Fall In Love" (Theme)			4:24
11.	"Maayavi" (Flute Theme)			4:28
Total length:				40:59

Mask (Telugu)
No.	Title	Lyrics	Singer(s)	Length
1.	"Gadiyaram" (Strings)	Vanamali	Aalap Raju	4:33
2.	"Lullaby For Loss" (Theme)			2:32
3.	"Naataina" (Bar Anthem)	Bhuvana Chandra	S. P. Charan	5:11
4.	"Blue Panther on the Prowl" (Theme)			1:37
5.	"Maayavi"	Rakendu Mouli	Chinmayi	4:30
6.	"Dont Drive Your Car With This Music On" (Theme)			4:43
7.	"Gadiyaram" (Guitar)	Vanamali	Aalap Raju	4:35
8.	"Cape Of Good Hope" (Theme)			2:44
9.	"Hell, Heaven And The Ladder" (Theme)			1:40
10.	"Come Lets Fall In Love" (Theme)			4:24
11.	"Maayavi" (Flute Theme)			4:28
Total length:				40:59

== Reception ==
The soundtrack album received positive reviews from critics, praising K's composition, and lyrics.

Reviewing the soundtrack album, Pavithra Srinivasan of Rediff rated the album with 3 stars out of 5 and wrote "With his second outing, K proves himself to be a competent musician, effectively rendering emotions into music. By and large, Mugamoodi's numbers grab your attention and carry you with them." Karthik Srinivasan of Milliblog criticized it as a "tepid soundtrack from K."

NDTV stated "The music drives the film with an adrenaline rush that will crawl through your body and make you want to cheer for the superhero". News18 wrote "BGM in the climax adds pep to the proceedings, while a bar anthem in the first half is impressive." The Times of India commented "K was praised for his background score in Mysskin's Yuddham Sei, does not disappoint in this film either. The background score is gripping and blends well with the movie. Among songs, 'Vaaya Moodi Summa Iru Da' is already a rage among youngsters and the song has been picturized aesthetically."

== Impact ==
The songs were trending on all FM stations and internet. The tracks "Vaayamoodi Summa Iru Da", "Maayavi" and "Bar Anthem" received acclaim post the audio release, with the former being a hit among youngsters and trended on numerous charts. In 2020, Zoom commented "Vaaya Moodi Summa Iru da became a chartbuster and is still the favourite for many listeners."

== Album credits ==
=== Backing vocals ===
Vasu, Senthildass Velayutham, Sam, Mysskin, K, Belliraj, Anand Aravindakshan, Ravishankar, Suraj

=== Instruments ===
- Guitars – Keba Jeremiah, Bruce Lee
- Percussions – Jeycha, Venkat, Shruthi, Avinash Jayakumar
- Winds – Vishnu
- Brass instruments – Maxwell Babu
- Saxophone – A Raja
- Solo violin – Kalyan

=== Production ===
- Composer – K
- Mixing – Tapas Nayak
- Mastering – S. Sivakumar
- Music coordination – R Vasu

== Accolades ==
Award (Note: Awards, festivals and organizations are in alphabetical order.)	Date of ceremony (Note: Date is linked to the article about the awards held that year, wherever possible.)	Category	Recipient(s)	Result	Ref.
Vijay Awards	11 May 2013	Favourite Song	"Vaayamoodi Summa Iru Da"	Nominated	
Edison Awards	10 February 2013	Best Playback Singer - Male	Aalap Raju (for "Vaayamoodi Summa Iru Da")	Won	
Big Tamil Melody Awards	19 August 2013	Best Singer (Male)	Aalap Raju (for "Vaayamoodi Summa Iru Da")	Nominated	
