= Ko (soundtrack) =

2011 soundtrack album by Harris Jayaraj

Soundtrack album by Harris Jayaraj
- Released: 19 January 2011
- Recorded: 2010–2011
- Genre: Feature film soundtrack
- Length: 29:46
- Language: Tamil
- Label: Sony Music India
- Producer: Harris Jayaraj

Harris Jayaraj chronology
Engeyum Kadhal (2010)	Ko (2011)	Force (2011)

Ko is the soundtrack to the 2011 Tamil-language political thriller film of the same name directed by K. V. Anand, starring Jiiva, Ajmal, Karthika and Piaa Bajpai. Featuring musical score composed by Harris Jayaraj, who previously worked with the director on Ayan (2009), the album features six tracks, with lyrics written by Pa. Vijay, Madhan Karky, Kabilan, Viveka, Vanamali, Sricharan, Emcee Jesz. Sony Music India acquired the film's music rights and the soundtrack was launched at a public event on 19 January 2011 with the cast and crew. The soundtrack album for the Telugu-dubbed version Rangam was released by Aditya Music on 9 March 2011.

== Background ==
The music compositions sessions took place in Macau where Harris had tuned all six tracks for the film. In late October 2010, he had recorded a club song for the film, while working on three other films. The song was recorded by Emcee Jesz, Vijay Prakash, Tippu, Solar Sai and Ranina Reddy and featured appearances from several Tamil film personalities, including Harris.

On the occasion of Diwali (5 November 2010), a teaser featuring the song "Ennamo Yeadho" was released to acclaim from critics and audience. The song was initially titled as "Kuviyamilla" which lyricist Madhan Karky termed as "out of focus" in Tamil, that refers to the protagonist Ashwin's (Jiiva) occupation as a photojournalist. But was later renamed to the original title. It further depicts his love for Renuka (Nair) as well as Saro's (Bajpai) affection towards him.

Harris claimed "Venpaniye" was one of his favourite songs from the album. He further described the music to be "completely different; young and energetic". The songs were shot in various locations across the world and Harris had been virtually present in all the locations so that he would get feel the feel of the film, and helps him to select appropriate tunes. Anand mentioned that "For the ‘Venpaniyae’ song in ‘Ko’, we went to Harbin, which is in the north-eastern part of China, bordered by Mongolia. Because Harris was insistent on the ambience, the tune was composed there."

== Release ==
The teaser's success prompted media to claim the soundtrack was "red hot" in audio sales due to the pull of the particular song, with the producers quoting up to ₹1 crore (US$110,000). Later Sony Music India acquired the film's music rights. The soundtrack was launched on 12 January 2011. The audio invitation was designed as a government file with a confidential paper, and having covers with evidence of photographs of the lead actors in various locations and an FIR of the suspects list of the cast and crew, that fictionally accuses them of Labour Law, Act of 2010 by working day and night of the film.

The music release coincided with a promotional event held at Image Auditorium in MRC Nagar, Chennai with the presence of cast and crew and other celebrities and was hosted by Jagan and Dhivyadharshini. The event was preceded with a laser show and a mime act on the life of a photographer with interactions from the cast and crew, and each members received a tabloid regarding information from the film. At the event, each crew members were invited on stage except for the lyricists, which led to Anand apologizing on his social media platforms. The marketing of the film's album cover involved Harris' image over the lead actors.

== Track listing ==
=== Tamil ===
No.	Title	Lyrics	Singer(s)	Length
1.	"Aga Naga"	Pa. Vijay; Additional lyrics: (unc.); Vanamali (Telugu portions), Emcee Jesz (rap)	Vijay Prakash, Tippu, Ranina Reddy, Priya Subramaniam, Solar Sai, Srik, Emcee Jesz	05:23
2.	"Ennamo Yeadho"	Madhan Karky; Additional lyrics: (unc.); Sricharan (rap), Emcee Jesz (rap)	Aalap Raju, Prashanthini, Sricharan, Emcee Jesz	05:36
3.	"Gala Gala"	Kabilan	Tippu, Krish, Haricharan, Sayanora Philip	04:53
4.	"Venpaniyae"	Pa. Vijay	Sriram Parthasarathy, Bombay Jayashree	05:28
5.	"Netri Pottil"	Madhan Karky	Naresh Iyer	02:43
6.	"Amali Thumali"	Viveka	Hariharan, Shweta Mohan, Chinmayi Sripaada	05:43
Total length:				29:46

=== Telugu ===
All lyrics are written by Vanamali.

No.	Title	Singer(s)	Length
1.	"Aga Naga"	Vijay Prakash, Tippu, Ranina Reddy, Priya Subramaniam, Solar Sai, Srik, Emcee Jesz	05:20
2.	"Endhuko Emo"	Aalap Raju, Prashanthini, Sricharan, Emcee Jesz	05:31
3.	"Gala Gala"	Tippu, Krish, Haricharan, Sayanora Philip	04:51
4.	"Ee Manchullo"	Sriram Parthasarathy, Bombay Jayashree	05:25
5.	"Masthish"	Naresh Iyer	02:40
6.	"Nemali Kulukula"	Unni Krishnan, Mallikarjun, Shweta Mohan, Chinmayi Sripaada	05:45
Total length:			29:32

== Reception ==
The soundtrack received mixed reviews from critics. Pavithra Srinivasan of Rediff gave a 2 out of 5, complimenting "Enamo Aedho" as "sweety and melodius" while other numbers are being "mish-mashed versions" of Jayaraj's earlier hits. Karthik Srinivasan from Milliblog reviewed "KV Anand may be a master storyteller, but his music sense continues to be strictly average; Harris doesn't help either." Vipin Nair of Music Aloud gave a rating of 7 out of 10, calling it as "a middling score from Harris Jayaraj". Malathi Rangarajan of The Hindu wrote "A couple of Harris Jayaraj's melodies are chartbusters already, but the re-recording, particularly in the climax, is din." N. Venkateswaran of The Times of India added "'Venpaniye', sung by Sriram Parthasarathy & Bombay Jayshree, is the pick of Harris Jayaraj's tunes, followed by the romantic 'Ennamo Yeatho' by Aalaap Raju and Prashanthini and the anthemic 'Netri Pottil' by Naresh Iyer."

The song "Enamo Aedho" was reviewed positively by film critics and received a breakthrough for its lead vocalist Aalap Raju, who initially worked as a bass guitarist, and becoming a playback singer.

== Accolades ==
Award (Note: Awards, festivals and organisations are in alphabetical order.)	Date of ceremony (Note: Date is linked to the article about the awards held that year, wherever possible.)	Category	Recipient(s) and nominee(s)	Result	Ref.
Chennai Times Film Awards	22 December 2011	Best Music Director	Harris Jayaraj	Won	
Chennai Times Film Awards	22 December 2011	Best Male Playback Singer	Aalap Raju – ("Ennamo Yeadho")	Won	
Filmfare Awards South	7 July 2012	Best Music Director – Tamil	Harris Jayaraj	Nominated	
Filmfare Awards South	7 July 2012	Best Male Playback Singer – Tamil	Aalap Raju – ("Ennamo Yeadho")	Won	
Maa Music Awards	2012	Best Dubbing Song	"Enduko Emo"	Won	
Mirchi Music Awards South	4 August 2012	Listener's Choice Award − Song	"Ennamo Yeadho"	Won (2nd place)	
Mirchi Music Awards South	4 August 2012	Listener's Choice Award − Album	Ko	Won (4th place)	
Tamil Nadu State Film Awards	13 July 2017	Best Music Director	Harris Jayaraj	Won	
Vijay Awards	16 June 2012	Favourite Song	"Ennamo Yeadho"	Won	
Vijay Awards	16 June 2012	Best Male Playback Singer	Aalap Raju – ("Ennamo Yeadho")	Nominated	
Vijay Awards	16 June 2012	Best Lyricist	Madhan Karky – ("Ennamo Yeadho")	Nominated	
Vijay Awards	16 June 2012	Best Background Score	Harris Jayaraj	Nominated	
