= Nanban (soundtrack) =

2011 soundtrack album by Harris Jayaraj

Soundtrack album by Harris Jayaraj
- Released: 23 December 2011
- Recorded: 2011
- Genre: Feature film soundtrack
- Length: 26:58
- Language: Tamil
- Label: Gemini Audio
- Producer: Harris Jayaraj

Harris Jayaraj chronology
7 Aum Arivu (2011)	Nanban (2011)	Oru Kal Oru Kannadi (2012)

Nanban is the soundtrack to the 2012 Tamil-language coming-of-age comedy-drama film of the same name directed by S. Shankar, starring Vijay, Jiiva, and Srikanth. Produced by Gemini Film Circuit, the film as an adaptation of Rajkumar Hirani's 3 Idiots (2009). The soundtrack to the film, features six tracks composed by Harris Jayaraj and lyrics written by Pa. Vijay, Viveka, Na. Muthukumar and Madhan Karky. The film's soundtrack was launched on 23 December 2011 through the company's subsidiary Gemini Audio. For the Telugu-dubbed version, Snehitudu, the album features six tracks written by Sirivennela Sitaramasastri, Vanamali, Ramajogayya Sastry. The soundtrack was also released on 19 January 2012.

== Development ==
Harris Jayaraj and Yuvan Shankar Raja were initially approached to compose the film's music, while Shankar chose the former, whom he had worked in Anniyan (2005). This film also marks Jayaraj's first collaboration with Vijay. Jayaraj started working on the film's music and completed it by late-2010. By February 2011, Jayaraj went to London to compose the tunes. Albeit being a remake, Jayaraj and Shankar did not want to reuse any tracks from the original film, and had composed six tunes in the process intended to fulfill fan's expectations.

Karky penned two songs for the film "Asku Laska" and "Enthan Kan Munne", the former is his 25th song as a lyricist. To experiment with the lyrics, he penned the first stanza in more than 16 different languages, expressing the word 'love'. The track "Heartile Battery" penned by Na. Muthukumar is a folk song set in Shuddha Dhanyasi raga. The film's teaser featured the song "En Frienda Pola" which received appreciation from audiences. The song is a montage number, which is based on friendship and the track also featured couple of English lyrics penned by Viveka, after the internet phenomenon of "Why This Kolaveri Di".

== Release ==
Initially, the film's soundtrack was scheduled to be launched at a grand event held on 15 December 2011 at the Chennai Trade Centre. However, the film's music launch was held on 23 December 2011. coinciding with the Harris: On The Edge concert tour held at the Hindusthan College of Arts and Science in Coimbatore. Preceded by the cast and crew and other celebrities, the event was attended by around 19,000 fans. The soundtrack to Snehithudu was launched at another event on 20 January 2012 in Hyderabad. It saw the attendance of the cast and crew, along with Ram Charan Teja and Dil Raju (the film's distributor). Rajkumar Hirani, Vidhu Vinod Chopra and Sharman Joshi, who were part of the original film 3 Idiots, were also present at the event.

== Track listing ==
=== Tamil ===
No.	Title	Lyrics	Singer(s)	Length
1.	"En Frienda Pola"	Viveka	Krish, Suchith Suresan	3:57
2.	"Heartile Battery"	Na. Muthukumar	Hemachandra, Mukesh Mohamed	5:35
3.	"Asku Laska"	Madhan Karky	Vijay Prakash, Chinmayi, SuVi	6:21
4.	"Enthan Kan Munne"	Madhan Karky	Aalap Raju	2:10
5.	"Irukana"	Pa. Vijay	Vijay Prakash, Javed Ali, Sunidhi Chauhan	5:10
6.	"Nalla Nanban"	Na. Muthukumar	Ramakrishnan Murthy	4:25
Total length:				26:58

=== Telugu ===
No.	Title	Lyrics	Singer(s)	Length
1.	"Mana Friendalle"	Sirivennela Seetharama Sastry	Krish, Suchith Suresan	3:35
2.	"Heartu lo Battery"	Vanamali	Hemachandra, Mukesh	5:35
3.	"Asku Laska"	Ramajogayya Sastry	Vijay Prakash, Chinmayi, SuVi	6:21
4.	"Toli Adugaina Padalede"	Sirivennela Seetharama Sastry	Aalap Raju	2:10
5.	"Ileana Chitti Belliana"	Ramajogayya Sastry	Vijay Prakash, Javed Ali, Sayanora Philip	5:10
6.	"Ne Vupiri Ne Sonthama"	Sirivennela Seetharama Sastry	Ramakrishnan Murthy	4:25
Total length:				26:36

== Reception ==
Vipin Nair of Music Aloud called it as a "commendable job" from the composer. Karthik Srinivasan of Milliblog said that, "Harris, with help from Shankar, redeems himself after the 7aum Arivu debacle." On the contrary, Pavithra Srinivasan from Rediff said that Harris Jayaraj had "obviously taken the safe route, sticking to his usual template for most of the songs in this album". Malathi Rangarajan of The Hindu said that "all of Harris' songs in Nanban are catchy"; she also complimented the song "Asku Laska" and Karky's lyric writing on having 16 languages in it, adding "scintillatingly tuned (Harris Jeyaraj) and lavishly filmed, the sequence should be a sell-out." Anupama Subramanian of Deccan Chronicle noted that "Harris Jayaraj music is peppy." Venkateswaran Narayanan of The Times of India wrote "All is well with Harris Jayaraj too and he comes up two hummable numbers in "Yen frienda pole" and "Asku laska." Reviewer based at IBNLive also wrote, "Harris Jayaraj’s songs are a disappointment though".

== Accolades ==
Award	Date of ceremony (Note: Date is linked to the article about the awards held that year, wherever possible.)	Category	Recipient(s) and nominee(s)	Result	Ref.
The Chennai Times Film Awards	4 November 2013	Best Lyricist	Madhan Karky for "Asku Laska"	Nominated	
The Chennai Times Film Awards	4 November 2013	Best Singer – Male	Vijay Prakash for "Asku Laska"	Won	
The Chennai Times Film Awards	4 November 2013	Best Singer – Female	Chinmayi for "Asku Laska"	Nominated	
Filmfare Awards South	20 July 2013	Best Female Playback Singer – Tamil	Chinmayi for "Asku Laska"	Nominated	
South Indian International Movie Awards	12–13 September 2013	Best Lyricist – Tamil	Madhan Karky for "Asku Laska"	Nominated	
Vijay Awards	11 May 2013	Best Music Director	Harris Jayaraj	Won	
Vijay Awards	11 May 2013	Best Male Playback Singer	Vijay Prakash for "Asku Laska"	Nominated	
