= Oru Kal Oru Kannadi (soundtrack) =

Soundtrack album by Harris Jayaraj
- Released: 5 March 2012
- Recorded: 2011-2012
- Genre: Feature film soundtrack
- Length: 25:45
- Language: Tamil
- Label: Sony Music India
- Producer: Harris Jayaraj

Harris Jayaraj chronology
| Nanban (2011) | Oru Kal Oru Kannadi (2012) | Maattrraan (2012) |

Oru Kal Oru Kannadi is the soundtrack album to the 2012 film of the same name directed by M. Rajesh starring Udhayanidhi Stalin, Santhanam and Hansika Motwani. The film featured five songs composed by Harris Jayaraj with lyrics written by Na. Muthukumar. The soundtrack was distributed by Sony Music India and was released on 5 March 2012 at the Sathyam Cinemas in Chennai, to positive reviews from critics.

== Development ==
Harris Jayaraj composed the film score and soundtrack in his maiden collaboration with Rajesh, and also replacing Yuvan Shankar Raja, who had previously composed Rajesh's Siva Manasula Sakthi (2009) and Boss Engira Bhaskaran (2010). Rajesh recalled that Udhayanidhi had promised Jayaraj to compose his debut film as a lead actor, as the latter had composed for Udhayanidhi's productions Aadhavan (2009) and 7 Aum Arivu (2011); Jayaraj further agreed which resulted in Rajesh finalizing his involvement as a composer. Jayaraj recalled that, during the music discussions of 7 Aum Arivu, Udhayanidhi insisted him on his involvement for Oru Kal Oru Kannadi and the film's director A. R. Murugadoss' persuasion resulted in Jayaraj taking that offer. The composing sessions took place in Singapore and Ooty.

== Release ==
The music rights were acquired by Sony Music India. The film's audio launch was held at Sathyam Cinemas in Chennai on 5 March 2012. Actors Suriya and Karthi respectively launched the film's music and trailer. The music for the film's Telugu version OK OK was launched on 12 July 2012 at HICC Novotel in Hyderabad with actors Naga Chaitanya, Siddharth and Sunil and directors B. V. Nandini Reddy, Maruthi, V. V. Vinayak, felicitating the event.

== Track listing ==
=== Tamil ===
All lyrics are written by Na. Muthukumar.

| No. | Title | Singer(s) | Length |
|---|---|---|---|
| 1. | "Kaadhal Oru" | Aalap Raju, Vedala Hemachandra, Sunitha Sarathy | 6:07 |
| 2. | "Azhage Azhage" | Mukesh Mohamed, Srimathumitha | 5:55 |
| 3. | "Akila Akila" | Aalap Raju, Chinmayi, Sharmila | 4:44 |
| 4. | "Adada Oru" | Karthik | 3:46 |
| 5. | "Venaam Machaan" | Naresh Iyer, Velmurugan | 5:12 |
| Total length: | | | 25:45 |

=== Telugu ===
All lyrics are written by Bhuvanachandra.

| No. | Title | Singer(s) | Length |
|---|---|---|---|
| 1. | "Just Like" | Aalap Raju, Vedala Hemachandra, Sunitha Sarathy | 6:07 |
| 2. | "Areree Areree" | Mukesh Mohamed, Srimathumitha | 5:55 |
| 3. | "Akila Akila" | Aalap Raju, Chinmayi, Sharmila | 4:44 |
| 4. | "Kalala Oka Devathe" | Karthik | 3:46 |
| 5. | "Vaddura Maavaa" | Naresh Iyer, Velmurugan | 5:12 |
| Total length: | | | 25:45 |

== Reception ==
Karthik Srinivasan of Milliblog summarized "Oru Kal Oru Kannaadi is wonderfully competent package from Harris". Pavithra Srinivasan of Rediff.com wrote "Harris Jeyaraj, the credits say, composed the music. Aside from Venaam Machan (which, though foot-tapping, is a rehash of Vaaranam Aayiram's Anjalai), there's nothing even remotely interesting about the music." Sify wrote "Harris songs though repetitive is hummable and the pick of the album is Kathal Oru Butterfly and Veenam Macha. Picturisation reminds you of several Suriya songs (Ayan, Aadhavan among others)."

The New Indian Express wrote: "Harris Jayraj's songs seem more like left-overs from his earlier films." Ajay Vardhan B. of The Hindu wrote: "Some songs seemed to be out-of-sync, but the usual Harris magic compensates for them. Visuals of the chart busters Venam Machan and Kaathal Oru Butterfly do justice to the audio. Others are just added to make the movie run long enough."
