= Engeyum Kadhal (soundtrack) =

Soundtrack album by Harris Jayaraj
- Released: 8 November 2010
- Recorded: 2009–2010
- Genre: Feature film soundtrack
- Length: 35:13
- Language: Tamil
- Label: Sony Music India
- Producer: Harris Jayaraj

Harris Jayaraj chronology
Orange (2010)	Engeyum Kadhal (2010)	Ko (2011)

Engeyum Kadhal is the soundtrack album to the 2011 film of the same name directed by Prabhu Deva starring Ravi Mohan and Hansika Motwani. The film's music is composed by Harris Jayaraj, with the soundtrack featuring eight songs written by Vaali, Thamarai, Na. Muthukumar, Madhan Karky, Emcee Jesz, Lady Kash and Jayaraj himself. The album was released under the Sony Music label on 8 November 2010 to positive reviews from critics.

== Development ==
For the film's music and score, Jayaraj travelled to Sydney on 19 December 2009 to work on the film's compositions. He located a coastal place near the suburbs on Sydney for the musicians and composed all the tracks there. Speaking to The Times of India, Jayaraj claimed that he shared a great rapport with Prabhu Deva and complimented the visuals which were in sync with the romantic theme of the film. The song "Nangaai" is inspired by Michael Jackson's "The Way You Make Me Feel". It is a fusion of world and Indian music and Jayaraj used South Indian instruments.

The song "Dhimu Dhimu" was reused as "Chilipiga" in the Telugu film Orange (2010), which released before Engeyum Kadhal due to its delay. While working on the film score, Jayaraj thought of an additional song which was required; this resulted in Jayaraj writing lyrics for a song "Kulu Kulu Ven Pani Pola" which he came across a crucial scene which was shot in Paris. He added "This is the scene in which the hero is introduced to the audiences and the heroine meets him for the first time. Earlier, we had an instrumental piece but when I watched the scene, I thought a song would be more enriching. It was 3 AM at that time and I could definitely not wake up any of my lyric writers! So, I decided to pen it myself." It was his first stint as a lyricist. Jayaraj introduced New York-based singer-songwriter Arjun Menon to record the song.

== Release ==
The audio rights were acquired by Sony Music. Initially, the film's music was set to be released during the first week of October 2010. The album had a soft launch on 8 November 2010 at the office of AGS Entertainment with the cast and crew members in attendance. Prior to its release, the songs were aired on all radio stations since Diwali (5 November).

== Track listing ==
=== Tamil ===
No.	Title	Lyrics	Singer(s)	Length
1.	"Thee Illai"	Vaalee	Naresh Iyer, Mukesh, Gopal Rao, Mahathi, Ranina Reddy	5:27
2.	"Engeyum Kadhal"	Thamarai	Aalap Raju, Devan Ekambaram, Ranina Reddy	5:31
3.	"Nangaai"	Vaalee	Richard, Rahul Nambiar, Haricharan, Naveen Madhav	4:36
4.	"Lolita"	Thamarai	Karthik, Prashanthini	5:09
5.	"Bathing at Cannes"	Emcee Jesz, Lady Kash	Emcee Jesz, Lady Kash and Krissy, Ranina Reddy	2:53
6.	"Nenjil Nenjil"	Madhan Karky	Harish Raghavendra, Chinmayi	5:14
7.	"Dhimu Dhimu"	Na. Muthukumar	Karthik	5:29
8.	"Kulu Kulu Venpani Pola"	Harris Jeyaraj	Arjun Menon	1:34
Total length:				35:13

=== Telugu ===
Ninnu Choosthe Love Vasthundi
No.	Title	Lyrics	Singer(s)	Length
1.	"Ennallugano"	Vanamali	Aalap Raju, Devan Ekambaram, Ranina Reddy	5:35
2.	"Segaledhu Pogaledhu"	Vanamali	Naresh Iyer, Mukesh, Gopal Rao, Mahathi, Ranina Reddy	5:30
3.	"Vallive"	Vanamali	Richard, Rahul Nambiar, Naveen Madhav	4:35
4.	"Lolita"	Vanamali	Karthik, Prashanthini	5:32
5.	"Bathing at Cannes"	Emcee Jesz, Lady Kash	Emcee Jesz, Lady Kash and Krissy, Ranina Reddy	2:55
6.	"Ninne Ninne Varincheno"	Vanamali	Harish Raghavendra, Chinmayi	5:32
7.	"Rimujimu Rimjim"	Vanamali	Karthik	5:34
8.	"Mila Mila"	Vanamali	Arjun Menon	1:34
Total length:				35:13

== Reception ==
"Engeyum Kaadhal music is turning out to be a chartbuster worldwide. Harris is at his best as the music is soothing and youthful. The audio sales opening is the best for the year so far."

— Ashok Parwani, Sony Music India managing director

Pavithra Srinivasan of Rediff.com gave a 3/5 rating and said "Engeyum Kadhal might sound, at times, like it's a mishmash of Harris Jeyaraj's previous works, but it does have its melodious moments, and those make the album worth a listen." Karthik Srinivasan of Milliblog wrote " Engeyum Kaadhal is quite 'safe' like Orange, but as a package, this one works significantly better and wonderfully well". S. R. Ashok Kumar of The Hindu described Jayaraj's music as "enchanting" and "make quite an impact". Sify called the music "outstanding". In contrast, The New Indian Express critic summarised "Harris Jayaraj's songs too barely register (like Ko)."

== Accolades ==
Award (Note: Awards, festivals and organisations are in alphabetical order.)	Date of ceremony (Note: Date is linked to the article about the awards held that year, wherever possible.)	Category	Recipient(s) and nominee(s)	Result	Ref.
Big FM Tamil Melody Awards	30 June 2012	Best Music Director	Harris Jayaraj	Won	
Big FM Tamil Melody Awards	30 June 2012	Best Album of the Year	Engeyum Kadhal	Won	
Filmfare Awards South	7 July 2012	Best Lyricist – Tamil	Thamarai – ("Engeyum Kadhal")	Nominated	
Filmfare Awards South	7 July 2012	Best Male Playback Singer – Tamil	Richard – ("Nangaai")	Nominated	
Vijay Awards	16 June 2012	Best Music Director	Harris Jayaraj	Nominated	
Vijay Awards	16 June 2012	Best Male Playback Singer	Karthik – ("Dhimu Dhimu")	Nominated	
Vijay Awards	16 June 2012	Favourite Song	"Nangaai"	Nominated	
