= Vaayamoodi Summa Iru Da =

2012 song by K

- Song cover featuring Jiiva and Pooja Hegde

Song by Aalap Raju

from the album Mugamoodi
- Language: Tamil
- Released: 1 August 2012
- Recorded: 2011–2012
- Studio: Kalasa Studio, Chennai; AM Studios, Chennai; Groove Planet, Chennai
- Length: 4:33
- Label: UTV Music; Saregama
- Composer: K
- Lyricist: Madhan Karky
- Producer: K

Mugamoodi track listing
- 1. "Vaayamoodi Summa Iru Da (Strings)"; 2. "Lullaby For Loss"; 3. "Bar Anthem"; 4. "Blue Panther on the Prowl"; 5. "Maayavi"; 6. "Dont Drive Your Car With This Music On"; 7. "Vaayamoodi Summa Iru Da (Guitar)"; 8. "Cape Of Good Hope"; 9. "Hell, Heaven And The Ladder"; 10. "Come Lets Fall In Love"; 11. "Maayavi (Flute Theme)"

"Vaayamoodi Summa Iru Da" (transl. Shut your mouth and be quiet) is an Indian Tamil-language song, composed by K, with lyrics written by Madhan Karky and sung by Aalap Raju for the soundtrack album of the 2011 Indian film Mugamoodi. The song was shot in Switzerland, featuring the lead actors, were choreographed by Radhika.

It was released on 1 August 2012 as the lead single from the album, through Saregama. The song has both strings and guitar versions. Upon release, the song received positive reviews by audience and critics. The track also topped the charts and FM stations.

== Production ==
=== Composition ===
The first song recorded for the film was the romantic song "Vaayamoodi Summa Iru Da". In late July 2011, K recorded the track, written by Madhan Karky. Karky revealed that the song is one of the best song he worked. K revealed that he met Aalap for recording the track, as per Karky's suggestion. Karky introduced small beautiful words in the song. The track "Vaayamoodi Summa Iru Da" had two versions– string and guitar. As both K and director Mysskin liked the string version, it was used in the film. K stated that Keba Jeremiah performed guitar version and he gave a new colour to the song. For giving Spanish unplugged feel, they recorded guitar version and used in the film. Chennai String section were conducted by B Yensone. The song was recorded at Kalasa Studio, Chennai, with 25–30 string players.

=== Lyrics ===
Karky wrote the song while he was in flight. "Thankfully, it was a good flight and the moments were romantic", he added. He also said that it was his 41st song and he inspired the lyrics from his father Vairamuthu.

== Music video ==
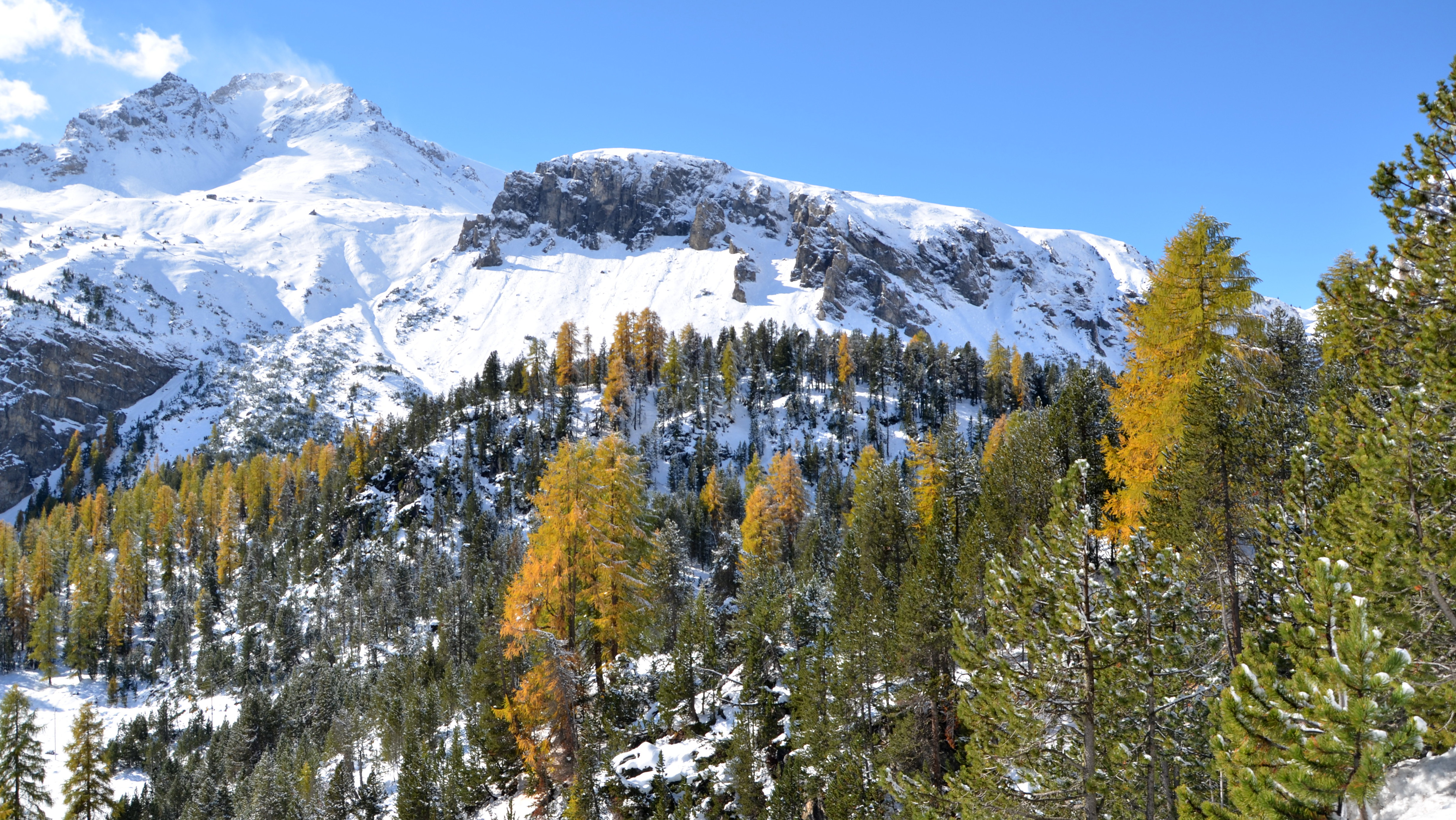
"Vaayamoodi Summa Iru Da" was shot in Switzerland.

The music video features Jiiva and Pooja Hegde. The music video was filmed at exotic locations in Switzerland in late July 2012. The music video was choreographed by Radhika, which featured lush green and ice mountains tops, beach, and fields.

== Release ==
The track was released on 1 August 2012 as the lead single from the album, through Saregama. K performed the song at the film's audio launch. The Telugu version of the song titled "Gadiyaram" was released on 15 August 2012.

== Reception ==
"Vaayamoodi Summa Iruda" received acclaim post the audio release.

Commenting "Mugamoodi's first number starts out with a conversation, mellow and soft, between friends", of Rediff.com wrote the song "has the talented Aalaap Raju's voice flitting like a gentle whisper through the romantic tune which alternates between mild anguish and contentment. Karky's verses add some piquancy to the situation. It does make for a pleasant listen."

Karthik Srinivasan of Milliblog wrote "With help from those hypnotic violins and the backing chorus crooning the song’s title repetitively, Vaayamoodi is a uniquely endearing song. Alaap Raju’s dreamy vocals and Karky’s charming imagination in the lyrics lend considerable charm here."

== Impact ==
In less than 24 hours after the release of the audio of Mugamoodi, "Vaayamoodi Summa Iruda" become a hit. The song became trending on FM stations and internet. In 2020, Zoom commented "Vaaya Moodi Summa Iru da became a chartbuster and is still the favourite for many listeners." The Times of India commented "Among songs, 'Vaaya Moodi Summa Iru Da' is already a rage among youngsters and the song has been picturized aesthetically."

== Accolades ==
Award (Note: Awards, festivals and organizations are in alphabetical order.)	Date of ceremony (Note: Date is linked to the article about the awards held that year, wherever possible.)	Category	Recipient(s)	Result
Vijay Awards	11 May 2013	Favourite Song	"Vaayamoodi Summa Iru Da"	Nominated
Edison Awards	10 February 2013	Best Playback Singer - Male	Aalap Raju (for "Vaayamoodi Summa Iru Da")	Won
Big Tamil Melody Awards	19 August 2013	Best Singer (Male)	Aalap Raju (for "Vaayamoodi Summa Iru Da")	Nominated
