= Harris: On the Edge =

2011 concert tour by Harris Jayaraj

Harris: On The Edge
- Tour by Harris Jayaraj
- Promotional poster for the tour
- Start date: 8 October 2011
- End date: 19 November 2011
- Legs: 4
- No. of shows: 7 in India

Harris: On The Edge is the first concert tour by Indian composer Harris Jayaraj. The tour also featured the original singers crooning the numbers for some of the songs.

== Background ==
In 2011, Harris announced a musical world tour titled "Harris on the Edge". He will be performing live all over the world accompanied by a troupe of Tamil playback singers, including Karthik, Haricharan, Chinmayi, Tippu, Harini Naresh Iyer, Harish Raghavendra, Krish, Aalap Raju, Kay Kay, Benny Dayal, Andrea, Megha, Suvi Suresh, Sunitha Sarathy, Srilekha Parthasarathy and Shweta Mohan and international musicians and dancers. The event was coordinated by Techfront and was directed by A. L. Vijay. The stage will reportedly be among the biggest in the world, with a 270-degree view, a first of its kind in the world. The concert would feature a futuristic video technology complementing music strains of the composer and will have 3D visuals for audience, interactive visuals, special artiste with unique choreography and engagement with spectators.

=== Tour ===
Tour was to kick start in Chennai on 2 October 2011 but was postponed to 8 October 2011, due to inclement weather. The tour was about to continue in Coimbatore on 16 October 2011, however due to unfavorable weather conditions the concert was again postponed to 24 December 2011, with Harris apologizing his fans via social network. The Coimbatore was later held on 23 December 2011 along with Nanban audio launch. The tour continued in Dubai on 4 February 2012.

The tour will continue in Madurai, which was added in later part owing to fans demand, Hyderabad, Kuala Lumpur. The second phase of the tour was planned in early 2012 to be performed in Europe, South Africa, North America and Australia. Harris revealed that he has kept aside his film scoring works and has not committed to any new projects of-late.

=== Television rights ===
Television rights for the tour were bought by Jaya TV, one of the major Tamil language satellite television channels based in Chennai, India.

== Tour dates ==
Date	City	Country	Venue
Asia
8 October 2011	Chennai	India	Mayajaal
23 December 2011	Coimbatore	India	Hindusthan College
	Madurai	India	
	Hyderabad	India	Ramoji City
4 February 2012	Dubai	United Arab Emirates	Festival City
	Kuala Lumpur	Malaysia	

== Concert synopsis ==
=== Chennai - 8 October 2011 ===
Song	Film	Artist
"Poopol Poopol"	Minnale	Naveen
"Azhagiya Theeye"	Minnale	Gautham Vasudev Menon
"Adiye Kolludhey"	Vaaranam Aayiram	Harris Jayaraj, Krish, Sunitha Sarathy
"Mundhinam Parthene"	Vaaranam Aayiram	Naresh Iyer
"Venmathi Venmathiye"	Minnale	Harini, Tippu
"Kalyanam Thaan Kattikittu"	Saamy	Suchitra, KK
"Anbe En Anbe"	Dhaam Dhoom	Harish Raghavendra, Megha
"Pala Pala"	Ayan	Haricharan
"Iru Vizhi Unadhu"	Minnale	Devan Ekambaram
"Oh Ringa Ringa"	7 Aum Arivu	Benny Dayal, Suchitra, Sharmila
"Thoodhu Varumaa"	Kaakha Kaakha	Sunitha Sarathy
"Hasili Fisiliye"	Aadhavan	Krish, Sharmila, Harini, Sri Charan
"Nenjukkul Peidhidum"	Vaaranam Aayiram	Haricharan, Megha, Solo Guitar: Steeve Vatz
"Enamo Aedho"	Ko	Aalap Raju, Harini, Sri Charan
"Oyaayiye Yaayiye"	Ayan	Benny Dayal, Haricharan, Shalini
"Vaseegara"	Minnale	Megha
"Uyirin Uyire"	Kaakha Kaakha	KK, Suchitra
"Randakka"	Anniyan	Krish, Haricharan, Harini
"Nangaai"	Engeyum Kaadhal	Harris Jayaraj, Rahul Nambiar, Benny Dayal
"Karka Karka"	Vettaiyaadu Vilaiyaadu	Devan, Tippu, Andrea Jeremiah
"Ava Enna (Anjalai)"	Varanam Aaiyaram	Krish, Megha
"Kannum Kannum Nokia"	Anniyan	Rahul Nambiar, Andrea Jeremiah
"Vennilave Velli Velli Nilave"	Vettaiyaadu Vilaiyaadu	All male singers mentioned above
