= Orange (soundtrack) =

Soundtrack album by Harris Jayaraj
- Released: 10 November 2010
- Recorded: 2009–2010
- Genre: Feature film soundtrack
- Length: 32:27
- Language: Telugu
- Label: Aditya Music
- Producer: Harris Jayaraj

Harris Jayaraj chronology
Aadhavan (2009)	Orange (2010)	Engeyum Kadhal (2011)
External audio
- Audio Jukebox on YouTube

Orange is the soundtrack to the 2010 Indian Telugu-language romantic film of the same name, directed by Bhaskar and starring Ram Charan and Genelia D'Souza. The soundtrack album includes six tracks composed by Harris Jayaraj marking his first collaboration with Bhaskar and Ram Charan. The album was released on 25 October 2010, at a promotional event held at Shilpakala Vedika in Hyderabad, and was marketed by the Aditya Music label. The audio of its Tamil dubbed version Ram Charan was launched at 4 Frames Theater in Chennai on 7 November 2012. The soundtrack album released to positive reviews and gained critical acclaim. It became one of the highest rated music albums in Telugu cinema. The album was positively received and was nominated at major award ceremonies.

== Production ==
Harris Jayaraj began working on this film from late October 2009 onwards. Before working on this film, Harris Jayaraj composed music for the delayed film Engeyum Kadhal, and the song "Dhimu Dhimu" that was finished in December 2009 was used in this film as "Chilipiga Chusthavala". The songs "O Range" and "Oola Oolala Ala" were shot in Australia. The song "Rooba Rooba" was initially supposed to be pictured on Genelia D'Souza, but after Ram Charan's suggestion that Genelia's homely nature would not work well, Shazahn Padamsee was featured. Vanamali felt that writing lyrics for "Nenu Nuvvantu" was tough because "Bhaskar wanted to convey the feel with simple words that fit into Harris Jayaraj's tune".

== Release ==
The audio was initially planned to be launched on 14 August 2010. However, the audio was launched on 10 September 2010 at Shilpakala Vedika in Hyderabad. The function was attended by Chiranjeevi, D. Ramanaidu, K. Raghavendra Rao, Nagendra Babu, Bhaskar, Allu Arjun, Rana Daggubati, Sai Dharam Tej, Harris Jayaraj, Anand Sai, V. V. Vinayak, Boyapati Srinu, Allu Aravind, K. S. Rama Rao, K. L. Narayana, Bhogavalli Prasad, D Danayya, Gemini Kiran, Paruchuri Venkateswara Rao, Brahmanandam, Ali, Venu Madhav etc. attended it. However Ram Charan and Genelia D'Souza missed the event as they were shooting for a song in Australia.

== Track listing ==
=== Telugu ===
No.	Title	Lyrics	Artist(s)	Length
1.	"Sydney Nagaram (Oola Oolala Ala)"	Surendra Krishna, Kedarnath Parimi	Karunya, Ranina Reddy	5:38
2.	"Chilipiga"	Vanamali	Karthik	5:30
3.	"Nenu Nuvvantu"	Vanamali	Naresh Iyer, Nadeesha, U.V. Jackey	4:51
4.	"Hello Rammante"	Ramajogayya Sastry	Vijay Prakash, Devan Ekambaram, D. Burn	4:45
5.	"O'Range"	Vanamali	Benny Dayal	4:16
6.	"Rooba Rooba"	Vanamali	Shail Hada, Chinmayi, Maya Iyer	5:18
7.	"Ye Vaipugaa (Unreleased/Theatrical Version)"	Vanamali	Sreerama Chandra	1:32
Total length:				32:27

=== Tamil ===
Ramcharan
No.	Title	Lyrics	Artist(s)	Length
1.	"Sydney Nagaram"	Arivumathi	Haricharan	5:37
2.	"Naanum Unnodu"	Viveka	Nivas	4:47
3.	"Hello Romantic"	Arun Bharathi	Devan Ekambaram	4:40
4.	"Rooba Rooba"	Arivumathi	Nidheesh Gopalan, Chinmayi, Maya Iyer	5:14
5.	"Nootrandu Kaathale"	Yugabharathi	Devan Ekambaran	4:13
6.	"Oruvali Paathai"	Viveka	Nivas	3:55
Total length:				28:26

== Reception ==
The audio received positive response. Musicperk.com gave a review stating "Harris Jayaraj has composed an urban product that will surely strike a chord with the youth...Almost all songs are great" and rated the film 3.5/5. Karthik of Milliblog! gave a review stating "Harris’ return, after an year, seems deliberately safe." IndiaGlitz gave a review stating "Orange, may be a fruit but as a colour, it is quite vibrant just as this album is. Harris Jayaraj has composed an urban product that will surely strike a chord with the youth! Almost all songs are great with 'Nenu Nuvvantu' standing out." ragalahari.com gave a review stating "Orange has its good and also has its not so good, just like the sweet-sour taste of orange fruit. The album starts off great and drags towards the end. Regardless, this album is being widely accepted due to Ram Charan’s reputation and the marketing of the film will further ensure the high sales of the music album." Cinecorn.com gave a review stating "At the end the album not just satisfies the expectations stated at the beginning, it goes even beyond it. Hence we get an album that's not just for the sake of commercial prospects but something that can be heard for some years to come. An album with excellent melody coupled with beautiful lyrics, always have a timeless appeal...as off today it stays with you long after you have finished listening" and rated the album 4/5. SuperGoodMovies gave a review stating "On a whole, Orange is an out and out classy album and is seriously addictive for music lovers..Harris have a winner on hands."

The audio was an instant success, with a record amount of Sales in the market. Aditya Gupta of Aditya Music expressed his happiness over it to the media speaking "My special thanks to Chiranjeevi garu, Allu Aravind garu, Nagababu garu and their family members for offering us the music rights with great trust...the music of ‘Orange’ composed by Harris Jayaraj is widely being received by the music movie buffs, especially in the form of iTunes, Apple Store, Nokia Stores, etc."

In an audio compilation of the best songs of the 2010s decade, Krishna Sripada of The Hindu, wrote "Harris Jayaraj’s Orange OST complemented its progressive storyline. Karthik’s lilting ‘Chilipiga’ to Shahil and Chinmayi's hippy 'Rooba Rooba' to Naresh's reflective ‘Nenu Nuvvantu’, every song in Orange was an emotion".

== Awards and nominations ==
Award	Category	Nominee	Result	Ref.
Filmfare Awards South	Best Music Director	Harris Jayaraj	Nominated	
Filmfare Awards South	Best Lyricist	Vanamali for "Nenu Nuvvantu"	Nominated	
Filmfare Awards South	Best Playback Singer – Male	Naresh Iyer for "Nenu Nuvvantu"	Nominated	
Mirchi Music Awards South	Technical Award for Sound Mixing – Telugu	M. Ramesh Aravind for "Rooba Rooba" (Note: Also for Shantanu Hudlikar for "Neeve" in Darling (2010).)	Won	
Mirchi Music Awards South	Best Album of the Year	Harris Jayaraj	Won	
Mirchi Music Awards South	Mirchi Listeners' Choice Song of the Year – Telugu	"Nenu Nuvvantu"	Won	
Mirchi Music Awards South	Mirchi Listeners' Choice Best Album	Harris Jayaraj	Won	
Big FM Awards	Best Music Director	Harris Jayaraj	Won	
Big FM Awards	Best Playback Singer	Karunya for "Oola Oolala Ala"	Won	
