= Amritha Ram =

Indian costume fashion designer and entrepreneur

- Born: Amritha
- Occupations: Entrepreneur, fashion costume designer, celebrity stylist
- Known for: Fashion designing
- Spouse: Ramji

Amritha Ram is an Indian fashion costume designer, television host and entrepreneur, who has worked on Tamil and Telugu language films.

== Career ==
In the early 2000s, Amritha worked in Chennai as a stylist and designer, before getting opportunities to direct and host television shows such as En Style on Polimer TV. Amritha went to study fashion and design at Fashion Institute of Technology, New York, and then moved back to work in the South Indian film industry. Upon return from New York, her first film was Mugamoodi (2012), a superhero drama film directed by Mysskin. She continued to work across the Tamil and Telugu film industries, notably working on S/O Satyamurthy (2015) and Sketch (2018). She also dressed Devi Sri Prasad for his American concert tour. One of her notable project to date was Vetrimaaran's Vada Chennai, which followed the underworld politics of north Chennai from 1977 to 2007, with different costumes needed for the different time periods.

In the late 2010s, she worked extensively with Kamal Haasan on his costumes for public appearances. Notably, she designed the actor's outfits for the promotions of Vishwaroopam 2 (2018), the Bigg Boss Tamil television series, and for his role in Indian 2 (2021).

Outside films, Amritha owns a fashion store named Soigne.

== Personal life ==
Amritha is married to actor and choreographer Ramji. She co-manages work for his dance schools.

Amritha narrowly avoided injury during a fatal accident which took place on the sets of Indian 2 in February 2020.

== Notable filmography ==
- Mahesh, Saranya Matrum Palar (2008)
- Odipolama (2009)
- Mugamoodi (2012)
- Pisaasu (2014)
- S/O Satyamurthy (2015)
- Veera Sivaji (2016)
- Shivalinga (2017)
- Neruppu Da (2017)
- Khaidi No. 150 (2017)
- Sketch (2018)
- Vada Chennai (2018)
- Namma Veettu Pillai (2019)
- Sangathamizhan (2019)
- Naadodigal 2 (2020)
- Paramapadham Vilayattu (2021)
- Kaa – The Forest (2024)
- Indian 2 (2024)
- Amaran (2024)
- Thug Life (2025)
