= Rabhasa (soundtrack) =

Soundtrack album To Rabhasa by S. Thaman
- Released: 4 August 2014
- Recorded: 2013–2014
- Genre: Feature film soundtrack
- Length: 20:54
- Language: Telugu
- Label: Aditya Music
- Producer: S. Thaman

S. Thaman chronology
Vaalu (2014)	Rabhasa (2014)	Power (2014)

Rabhasa is the feature film soundtrack of the 2014 film of the same name directed by Santosh Srinivas starring N. T. Rama Rao Jr., Samantha Ruth Prabhu, Pranitha Subhash in the lead roles. The film's soundtrack consists of five songs all composed by S. Thaman while the lyrics were penned by Ramajogayya Sastry, Anantha Sreeram and Sri Mani. The film also marked N. T. Rama Rao Jr.'s return as a playback singer after a hiatus of four years. The film's soundtrack released on 4 August 2014 at Shilpakala Vedika in Hyderabad through Aditya Music label.

== Development ==
Initially during the launch of the film, it was reported that Devi Sri Prasad was hired as the music director. However S. Thaman replaced him later. However reports emerged that Anoop Rubens would compose the music for the film. It was reported that Anoop replaced Thaman as Thaman's music for the recent projects were received with negative response. However, Santosh decided to keep Thaman as the music director of the film after participating in the music sittings with Anoop Rubens in September 2013. Anoop on this issue responded "It was purely Santosh’s decision. I was working on a song and it was not fully complete." Thus it made Thaman re enter the film as the music director since Santosh and Anoop failed to be on the same page. In December 2013, reports emerged that the song "Attamadugu Vaagulona Atta Kodako" from the 1981 blockbuster film Kondaveeti Simham starring N. T. Rama Rao and Sridevi was said to be remixed in this film and N. T. Rama Rao Jr. and Samantha Ruth Prabhu would star in it. In mid-February 2014, reports emerged that N. T. Rama Rao Jr. would sing a song in this film thus turning a singer again after singing in his previous films Yamadonga, Kantri and Adhurs. On 11 July 2014 Thaman informed on his Twitter page that Karthik sang a song in this film whose lyrics were penned by Anantha Sreeram. Later in mid-July 2014, it was confirmed that the song performed by N. T. Rama Rao Jr. is titled Raakasi Raakasi and his voice was modulated accordingly by Thaman later.

== Track listing ==
Track list
No.	Title	Lyrics	Artist(s)	Length
1.	"Maar Salaam"	Ramajogayya Sastry	Suchith Suresan	03:39
2.	"Raakasi Raakasi"	Sri Mani	Jr. NTR	04:12
3.	"Garam Garam Chilaka"	Sri Mani	Sri Krishna, Deepu, Bindu, Parnika	04:04
4.	"Hawa Hawa"	Ananta Sriram	Karthik, Megha	04:56
5.	"Dam Damaare"	Sri Mani	Simha, Sooraj Santhosh, Nivas, Deepthi Madhuri, Manasa Acharya, Pavani	04:03
Total length:				20:54

== Release ==
In the fourth week of May 2014, it was reported that the film's audio would release in June 2014. In the second week of June 2014, it was confirmed that the makers would release the audio on 20 July 2014. But the Telangana State Government did not gave permission for the audio launch on 20 July because of security reasons as the state's biggest festival Bonalu is celebrated statewide on that day. Thus the date was postponed to 26 July 2014. Later the makers finalized 27 July 2014 at the date of soundtrack's release. The makers wanted to release the soundtrack on 27 July 2014 at Shilpakala Vedika in Hyderabad but because of non-availability of venue, the release date was shifted to 4 August 2014, which was confirmed by them on 20 July 2014. The same was confirmed officially by releasing a press note on 22 July 2014.

=== Marketing ===
The Incomplete Track list featuring six songs without any details of singers, lyricists and duration was released into the internet on 13 July 2014. It was reported later that N. T. Rama Rao Jr. would perform in the audio launch event held at Shilpakala Vedika. On 4 August 2014, the Audio release poster featuring a still of N. T. Rama Rao Jr. and Samantha Ruth Prabhu from a song in the film was released which confirmed that the film's soundtrack is marketed by Aditya Music. The event had a live streaming on MAA TV from 7:30 pm and in one of the Aditya Music's official YouTube channels named Aditya MusicNMovies. Apart from them, the event had a live telecast in MAA Movies from 7:30 pm. Aditya Music released the full tracks and official jukebox hours before the audio launch which proved the released track list wrong. The jukebox featured 5 songs contrary to the released track list and it contained varying genres.

=== Reception ===
The songs received viral response before the audio launch on 4 August 2014. The soundtrack also received positive reviews from critics. IndiaGlitz gave a review stating "When it is Thaman, expect a lot of exuberance in the air. As if to match the title's theme, he dishes out a rumbustious music. If that is a qualification, the rumbustiousness of Rabhasa is not in many colors. Thaman induces a deja vu feeling in two songs, while the others live up to his image." it added "The choice of lyricists ranges from the profound Ramajogayya Sastry and Ananth Sriram to the prolific Srimani. The singers give a good output, with Suchit Suresan's voice leading the pack. With NTR singing a number for this album, Rabhasa is surely going to be a special one for his fans. The lyrics give an indication of the kind of story we may be in for." 123Telugu gave a review stating "On the whole, Thaman plays it safe with Rabhasa, and gives a mixed bag of songs. Right from romance, fun and massy numbers, this album has it all. Rakasi Rakasi, Maar Salam and Hawa Hawa are sure shot hits and our picks. Finally, Rabhasa’s music album sounds decent and will definitely grow on you, once you watch them visually."
