= Megha (singer) =

Indian singer

- Born: Harini Ramachandran; 18 March 1987 (age 39)
- Genres: Carnatic, Western Classical
- Occupations: Playback singer, live performer
- Instrument: Vocalist
- Years active: 2007–current
- Website: singermegha.com

Harini Ramachandran, professionally known as Megha (born 18 March 1987) is a Tamil playback singer, singing predominantly in Tamil, Telugu, Malayalam, Kannada and Sinhala She is also a co-founder of School of Excellence, that offers NLP programs and models.

== Early life ==
Megha is the great-grand daughter of Papanasam Sivan, a Carnatic composer. Born in Chennai, she relocated to Bangalore, where she completed most of her schooling. She earned her bachelor's degree in Commerce in Chennai and pursued a master's degree in Human Resources while making her foray into playback singing in 2007. She has completed grade 8 from Trinity College London in Western classical music under the guidance of renowned musician Augustine Paul from Chennai.

== Career ==
Megha is a playback singer in the South Indian film industry. She was introduced into the film industry by music director Vijay Antony in the film Naan Avanillai (2007), and has worked with music directors including Ilaiyaraaja, A. R. Rahman, Harris Jayaraj, Devi Sri Prasad, Vijay Antony and D. Imman. After finding success in singing, she developed an interest in learning neuro-linguistic programming techniques. She got an opportunity to learn it from John Grinder, the founder of NLP. To pursue her interest further, in 2011 she co-founded School of Excellence to offer programs on NLP modelling to overcome personal issues and depressions. After exhibiting NLP sessions and programs for individuals, she along with co-founder of School of Excellence started working on conducting events and sessions to cover mass people, including NLP sessions for underprivileged kids of missionary schools in Mumbai to boost confidence and overcome personal challenges. During this phase, Megha and his business partner started developing and innovating on a new technology for personal development called Excellence Installation Technology (EIT). She has been working on developing a team of EIT experts, trained by them to provide business, health and legacy acceleration services through personal transformation using EIT across the country.

== Live performances ==
Megha has performed live in various concerts, star nites and with music directors such as Harris Jayaraj on the Concert (world) tour – "Harris: On The Edge".

She actively performs in western classical concerts in Chennai and with the Madras Musical Association choir.

== Discography ==
=== Tamil ===
Year	Song	Film	Music director
2007	"Kakha Kakha"	Naan Avanillai	Vijay Antony
2007	"Nee Kavidhai"	Naan Avanillai	Vijay Antony
2007	"Thoziya"	Kadhalil Vizhunthen	Vijay Antony
2007	"Doley"	Kadhalil Vizhunthen	Vijay Antony
2007	"Hey Yen Mama"	Marudhamalai	D. Imman
2007	"Pogadhey Pogadhey"	Naiyaandi	M. Ghibran
2008	"Surangani (Remix)"	Pandhayam	Vijay Antony
2009	"Thuppaaki Penne"	Peraanmai	Vidyasagar
2009	"Maasi Maasi"	Aadhavan	Harris Jayaraj
2009	"Vaarayo Vaarayo"	Aadhavan	Harris Jayaraj
2010	"Thiki Thiki"	Nagaram Marupakkam	Thaman
2010	"Happy Song"	Bale Pandiya	Devan
2010	"Naalai Swiss"	Neram	Rajesh Murugesan
2010	"Singam Singam (Theme)"	Singam	Devi Sri Prasad
2010	"Stole My Heart"	Singam	Devi Sri Prasad
2010	"Jessie's Land"	Vinnaithaandi Varuvaayaa	A R Rahman
2011	"Step It Up"	Kaavalan	Vidyasagar
2011	"Viduthalaikuyil Naan"	Ayyan	Ilayaraja
2011	"Mazhai Pozhiyum"	Muppozhudhum Un Karpanaigal	G. V. Prakash
2011	"Mun Andhi"	7 Aum Arivu	Harris Jayaraj
2012	"Yenmele Indru"	Ishtam	S. Thaman
2012	"College Paadam"	Naan Rajavaga Pogiren	G. V. Prakash
2012	"Yaaradi Mohini"	Thaandavam	G. V. Prakash
2013	"Agaladhey Agaladhey"	Settai	S. Thaman
2013	"Kanimozhiye"	Irandam Ulagam	Harris Jayaraj
2013	"Sol Sol"	Thalaivaa	G.V. Prakash
2013	"Facebook Login"	JK Enum Nanbanin Vaazhkai	G.V. Prakash
2013	"Modern Kalyanam"	Kalyana Samayal Saadham	Arrora
2014	"Lovely Ladies"	Naan Sigappu Manithan	G.V. Prakash
2014	"Yelelo"	Naan Sigappu Manithan	G.V. Prakash
2014	"Nee Vandhu Ponadhu"	Yaan	Harris Jayaraj
2015	"Aavaaram Poovukkum"	Kaaval	G.V. Prakash
2022	"Yaara Ve"	Nitham Oru Vaanam	Gopi Sundar

=== Telugu ===
Year	Song	Film	Music director
2009	"Mahalakshmi"	Sankham	Thaman
2009	"Dhakkudhakku"	Sankham	Thaman
2009	"AmmayiniPadayalante"	U & I	Karthik
2009	"MaasiMaasi"	Ghatikudu	Harris Jayaraj
2009	"Anjali"	Anjaneyulu	Thaman
2009	"KarigeLoga"	Arya 2	Devi Sri Prasad
2010	"NamoVenkatesa"	Namo Venkatesa	Devi Sri Prasad
2010	"Boom Shakalaka"	Syeaata	Devi Sri Prasad
2010	"SingamSingam (Theme)"	Yamudu	Devi Sri Prasad
2010	"Stole my heart"	Yamudu	Devi Sri Prasad
2010	"Chirugaaley"	Mirapakaay	Thaman
2010	"Jessie's Land"	Ye Maaya Chesave	A R Rahman
2011	"Rao gari abbayi"	Mr. Perfect	Devi Sri Prasad
2011	"AkasamBadhalaina"	Mr. Perfect	Devi Sri Prasad
2011	"Adara Adara"	Dookudu	Thaman
2012	"Cinderella"	Endhukante Premanta	G. V. Prakash Kumar
2012	"Chakkani Bike Undi"	Julayi	Devi Sri Prasad
2012	"Eppudu"	Chinni Chinni Aasa	Karthik
2013	"Meghamala"	Jabardasth	Thaman
2013	"Padipoyanila"	Balupu	Thaman
2014	"Gala Gala"	Race Gurram	Thaman
2014	"Hawa Hawa"	Rabhasa	Thaman
2015	"Dorikaade"	Pandaga Chesko	Thaman
2015	"Lehchalo"	Bruce Lee - The Fighter	Thaman
2019	"Touch Karo"	Voter	Thaman

=== Kannada ===
Year	Song	Film	Music director	Co-singer(s)
2008	"Nee NanageBeku"	Budhivanta	Vijay Antony	
2009	"SwalpaSoundu"	Suryakaanti	Illayaraja	
2009	"Mummy mummy"	Devru	Sadhu Kokila	
2009	"Excuse Me Thippaiyya"	Raam	V. Harikrishna	Tippu
2010	"ShivakasiBombuNaanu"	Kari Chirathe	Anoop Seelin	
2010	"Lavanyaninnasarasava"	Boss	V. Harikrishna	
2012	"Sarigama Sangamave"	Godfather	A. R. Rahman	
2015	"Do Something"	Shivalinga	V. Harikrishna	
2016	"Ninthalli Nillalare"	Chakravyuha	S. Thaman	
2016	"Mamaseetha"	Jaguar	S.Thaman	

=== Malayalam ===
Year	Song	Film	Music director
2010	"NilaNila"	Tournament	Deepak Dev
2010	"Manassil"	Tournament	Deepak Dev
2011	"Chanja"	Trance	Sushin Shyam

=== Sinhala ===
Year	Song	Music Director
2012	Kawudo Awa	Romesh Sugathapala

== Awards ==
- Kannadasan Award – Ajanta Fine Arts
- 2010: Nominated, Vijay Music Award for Best Song of the Masses – "Singham Singham" from Singam
