= Franco Simon =

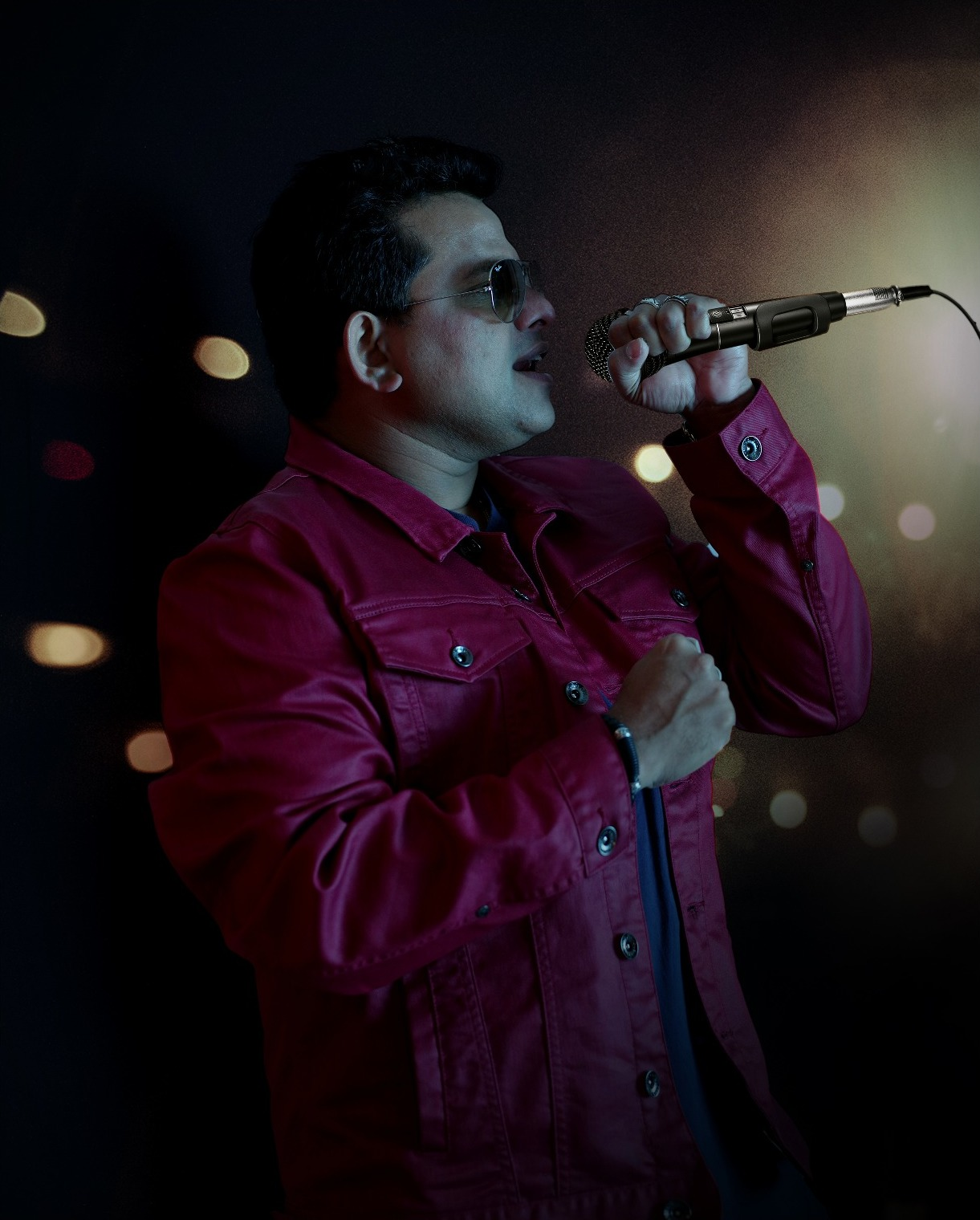

Background information
- Also known as: Franko
- Born: Franco Simon Neelankavil; 7 October 1974 (age 51)
- Origin: Thrissur, Kerala, India
- Genres: Filmi, Pop, Religious music
- Instrument: Vocals
- Years active: 2000–present

Franco Simon (born 7 October 1974) is an Indian singer and music composer from Kerala. He has sung around 150 Malayalam films songs and 1500 album songs in 5 different languages. He is the nephew of well-known Indian film composer Ouseppachan. He is a recipient of GMMA award and multiple Yuvaprathibha Puraskar for his soundtrack albums.

== Biography ==
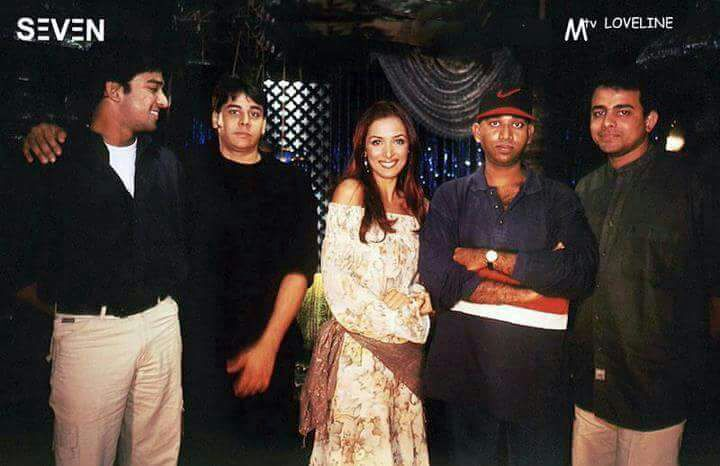
Franco with band members Stephen Devassy(left) and Malaika Arora in a stage event

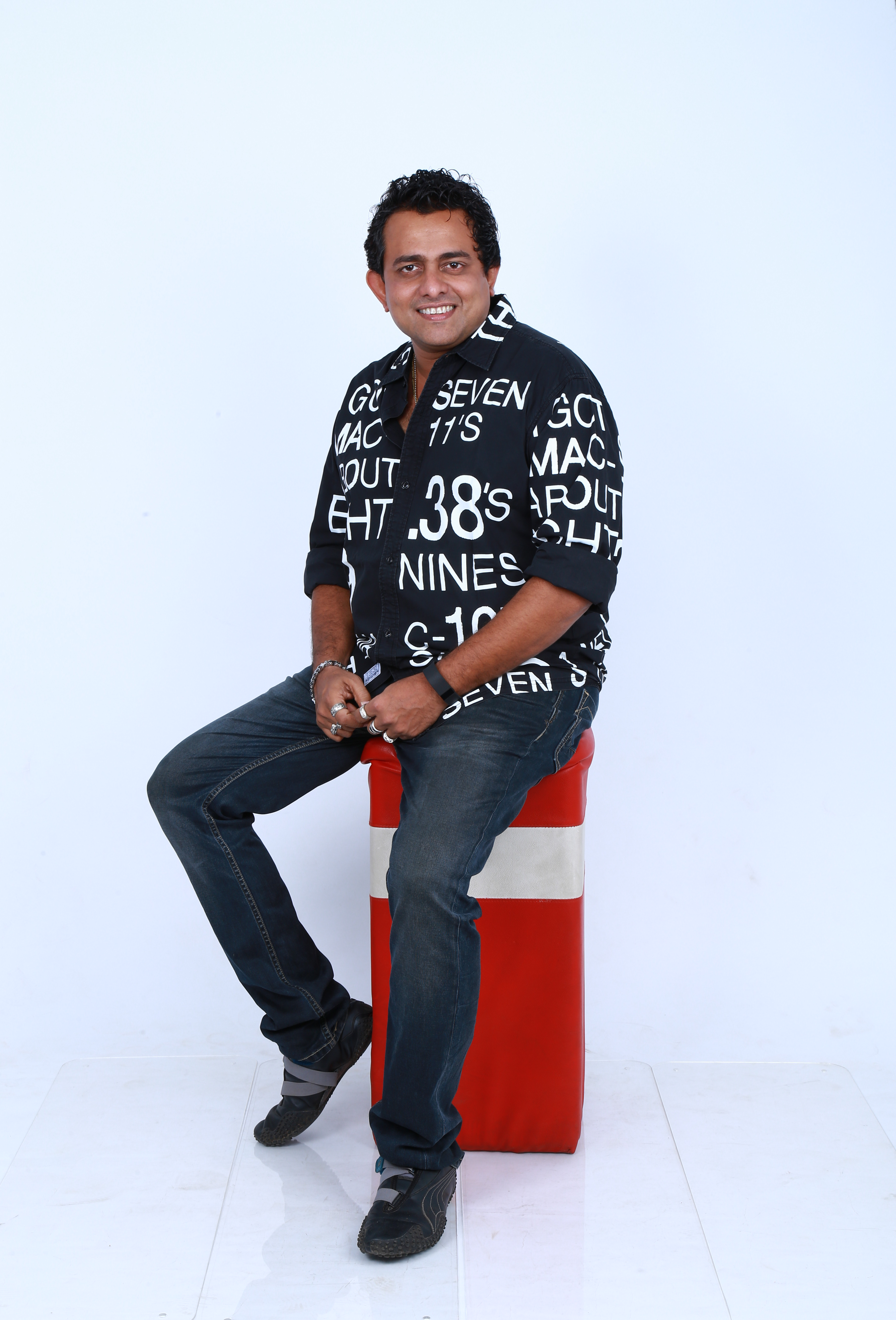
Franco Simon

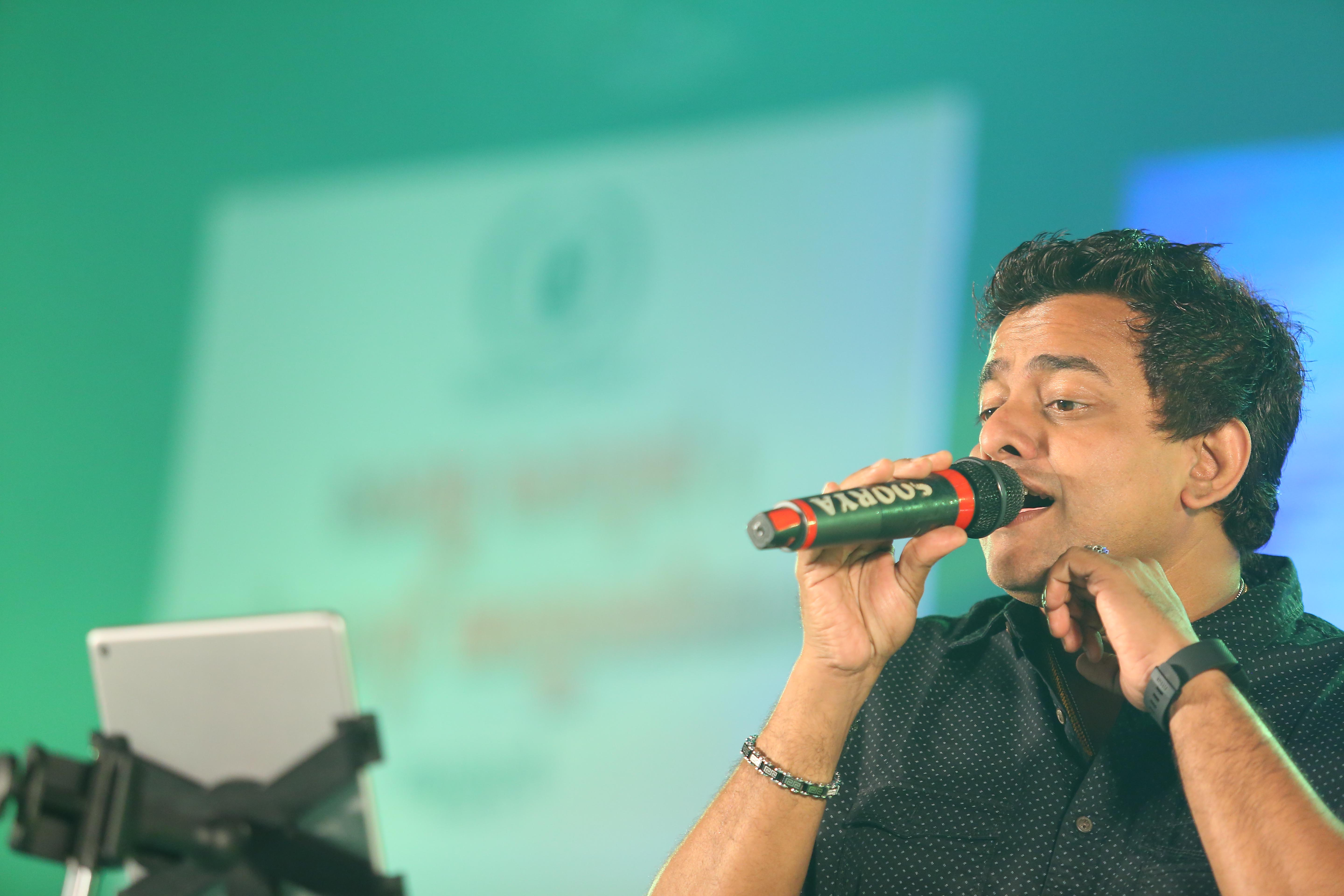
Franco Simon performing on Stage

Franco Simon Neelankavil was born to Simon N.P. and Alice M.L on 7 October 1974 in Thrissur, Kerala, India. He is the oldest of four children. According to his parents, he has exhibited great interest in music and started singing at a very early age. He had his first on-stage performance when he was only 4 years old and has since won many awards and competitions. Franco completed his B.A. in music from Madras University.

Franco's first cinematic song was En Karalil (Raakshasi) from the movie Nammal in 2002. In 2005, Franco formed a band called Band Seven with Stephen Devassy and Sangeeth Pavithran. An Indian pop band, they released a Hindi album titled Yeh Zindagani. In association with Kosmic Music, Franco has composed numerous Hindu devotional songs in Telugu, Kannada and Sanskrit languages. Two of the hit songs from the very popular 2006 Malayalam album Chempakame brought his talents to the limelight when the album stayed on the top requested list for over 2 years. His Christian meditation album Moran Amekh in Sanskrit is unique in the world of meditation music.

== Partial Discography ==
Languages sung

- Malayalam
- Tamil
- Telugu
- Hindi
- English
- Sanskrit

Popular Songs in Malayalam Films

- Rakshasi (Nammal)
- Dhumthanakkidi Dhumma (Mullavalliyum Thenmavum)
- Pineapple Penne (Vellinakshathram)
- Kanaponnum thedi (Chanthupottu)
- Panchara chiri kondu (Merikkundoru Kunjadu)
- Avani ppadam Poothallo (Maya Mohini)
- Januariyil (Ayalum Njanum Thammil)
- Velli Chirakukal (Chapters)
- Appakkale (Polytechnic)
- Hai Hai Hailesa (Pullipulikalum Attinkuttiyum)
- Vasoottan (Jamna Pyari)
- Bum Hare (Double barrel)
- Kinavile (Pranchiyettan)
- Enne ninakkinnu Priyamalle (youth festival)
- Othu pidichal (3 dots)

Popular Songs in Tamil Films

- Ullahi Ullahi (Lesa Lesa)
- Do Do doda (Ullam Ketkumae)
- Neruppe (Vettaiyaadu Vilaiyaadu)
- Theye Theeye (Maattrraan)
- Title song (Thakadimi tha)
- Title song (Thavam)

Popular songs in Telugu Films

- Ready
- Current
- Raghavan
- Brothers

Popular Songs In Hindi Film

- Freeky Chakra

Popular songs in English Film

- Dam 999

Lead singer in bands

- Band Seven
- Road House
- Q8 Band

Popular Malayalam albums

- Sundariye vaa (Malayalam album)
- Chempakame (Malayalam pop album)
- Akkara Pacha
- Belief (Gospel album)
- 4U (Band Seven album)
- Yeh Zindagani (Hindi album)

Sanskrit album

- Moran Amekh (Christian meditation album in Sanskrit, 2016)
