= Maattrraan =

2012 film by K. V. Anand

- Theatrical release poster
- Directed by: K. V. Anand
- Written by: K. V. Anand; Subha
- Dialogues by: Subha
- Produced by: Kalpathi S. Aghoram; Kalpathi S. Ganesh; Kalpathi S. Suresh
- Starring: Suriya; Kajal Aggarwal; Sachin Khedekar; Tara
- Cinematography: Soundararajan
- Edited by: Anthony
- Music by: Harris Jayaraj
- Production company: AGS Entertainment
- Release date: 12 October 2012
- Running time: 169 minutes
- Country: India
- Language: Tamil

Maattrraan (transl. Alternate) is a 2012 Indian Tamil-language action thriller film directed by K. V. Anand, who co-wrote the script with Subha, and produced by AGS Entertainment. The film stars Suriya in a dual role as conjoined twins and Kajal Aggarwal in the female lead, alongside Sachin Khedekar and Tara in pivotal roles with an ensemble supporting cast. It follows two brothers who investigate a genetic conspiracy related to their father's company.

The film entered production in July 2011. A major portion of the film was shot in countries like Croatia, Serbia, Albania and Macedonia, as well as Latvia and other parts of Europe, with rest of the scenes in India. The film features music composed by Harris Jayaraj, cinematography handled by Soundararajan, editing done by Anthony, respectively. V. Srinivas Mohan, handled the visual effects. Maattrraan was the first Indian film to use performance capture technology. The film was released on 12 October 2012 to mixed reviews.

== Plot ==
Ramachandran is an Indian geneticist who works for the Soviet Union. While on a vacation in India, he attempts to create a human with several talents through baby designing, which leads to the birth of his sons, Akhilan and Vimalan, who are conjoined at the chest area. As they both share a common heart, doctors recommend a sacrificial surgery to which their mother, Sudha, objects. As the brothers grow older, they are poles apart in character; Vimalan is intellectual and good at studies, while Akhilan is carefree and poor at studies. Following the dissolution of the Soviet Union, Ramachandran becomes unemployed and returns to India. For many months, Ramachandran attempts to secure funding for his projects but fails as neither the Government of India nor Venture capitalists are willing to help him. Ramachandran attempts suicide but is stopped by Sudha. With the savings of his family, Ramachandran begins work on his most ambitious project on a small scale.

Many years later, Ramachandran becomes a successful geneticist, with the help of his family. His company, Locus Lacto Product, has made a large amount of profit through their product Energion, which is the best-selling children's powdered milk energy drink in the market, making him a billionaire. Vimal has grown up to be an honest man who has graduated from college with a degree in chemistry, while Akhilan enjoys life. They become smitten by Anjali, who has joined their company as a translator, along with her Russian friend, Volga, a journalist. Vimalan and Anjali fall in love, causing Akhilan to feel jealous, yet he is happy for them.

It is revealed that Volga is a spy who has been tasked with stealing Energion's secrets. After her cover is blown, she is thrown out of the office by Ramachandran. Volga takes the brothers to their cattle farm under the pretext of an interview, where she takes photos and collects a milk sample from the farm. When Vimalan confronts Volga, she reveals that Energion is an adulterated product that can lead to the deaths of thousands of children. Volga adds that an industrialist named Ajay Rathnam joined their company as a spy, and after being exposed was murdered by Ramachandran. She also accuses their father of killing their R&D head, Raghu and setting the lab on fire to destroy evidence. Consequently, Volga is killed by Ramachandran's henchman, Dinesh. However, she swallows a pen drive containing evidence of foul play before dying. Anjali acquires it from the surgeon performing the autopsy and hands it to Vimalan. Following this, Vimalan and Akhilan are attacked by the goons who attempt to steal the pen drive from them. Akhilan believes the attack was only meant to rob them. In the midst of the fight, Vimalan is struck on the head by the gang leader, Prathap Bihari.

Vimalan is declared brain-dead and his heart is transplanted to Akhilan. After the brothers are separated through a surgery, which results in Vimalan's total death, Akhilan and Anjali become depressed. Sudha is warned that Energion is adulterated and confronts Ramachandran, who asks the food safety department to inspect their company. To her surprise, Energion is declared safe and hygienic. Meanwhile, Akhilan captures Prathap, who is then killed by an oncoming train. Akhilan tracks down Dinesh, using Prathap's phone. He finds the pen drive that contains several documents declaring that the ingredients supplied at the cattle farm are unsafe to eat. It is also revealed that the scheme was planned in Ukvania.

Accompanied by Anjali, Akhilan sets out to solve the mystery. They seek the help of Anjali's friend, Ashok, who works for the Indian Embassy in Ukvania, a post-Soviet state. However, Ashok is killed by Dinesh, who tracked him down. They discover photos showing athletes competing under the Soviet Union in the 1992 Summer Olympics. The athletes in the photos were declared dead in a plane crash. They discover at an army research centre that Ramachandran created Energion as a steroid to improve the performance of athletes at the Olympics. Despite the country performing well, the athletes became critically unwell from the ingredients of the steroid. The plane crash was fabricated to avoid national shame. They learn that the Energion could only be detected using an ionization enhancer. Dinesh tracks them down and proceeds to attack them. Akhilan manages to kill his goons, including Dinesh. He discovers that Ramachandran sent Dinesh to kill Vimalan and Volga.

Akhilan takes the ingredients back to India and exposes Ramachandran. As Ramachandran goes into hiding, Akhilan requests him to surrender, but Ramachandran retorts that he and Vimal are a result of his father's failed experiment, made up of several talented people's DNA. Ramachandran reveals that he used society to create Energion. He attempts to kill Akhilan with a rock, but his leg is crushed by the same rock. Mournfully, Akhilan leaves his father to die by letting rats chew his flesh. Antidotes are given to all the children who drank Energion across the country, and Akhilan is given national recognition for his work. Sometime later, Akhilan and Anjali marry and become parents to conjoined twins.

== Cast ==
- Suriya in a dual role as:
  - Akhilan Ramachandran
  - Vimalan Ramachandran
- Kajal Aggarwal as Anjali
- Sachin Khedekar as Dr. Ramachandran
- Tara as Sudha Ramachandran
- Irina Maleva as Volga
- Julia Bliss as Nadia
- Ravi Prakash as Dinesh
- Shankar Krishnamurthy as Varadharajan
- Ajay Rathnam as Ajay Rathnam, an industrialists
- Reda Oumouzoune as Russian soldier
- Sendrayan as Pachamuthu
- Vivek as Ashok
- Nivin as Jaganathan Raja
- Krishnamoorthy as Locus Lacto Workers Union protest leader
- Kumar Natarajan as Doctor
- Isha Sharvani (special appearance in the item number "Theeye Theeye")
- Ajmal Ameer as D. Vasanthan Perumal (photo presence)

== Production ==
During the post-production of Ko, K. V. Anand announced that he would direct Suriya again after the success of Ayan, further noting that it would be produced by AGS Entertainment and would begin once Suriya finished shooting for A. R. Murugadoss's 7 Aum Arivu. In an interview, Anand said that, while on a flight from Spain to Chennai after finishing shooting a song sequence for S. Shankar's Sivaji: The Boss (2007) he read an article about the Thailand-based Siamese twins Chang and Eng Bunker, which inspired him to write a story about Siamese twins. He narrated the story to Suriya who showed interest, but stalled the project due to the underdeveloped technology, leading to the duo making Ayan instead. During the late production stage the title was slightly changed from Maatraan to Maattrraan, the repetition of certain letters meant to reflect the film's theme of conjoined twins. In May 2011 Kajal Aggarwal was announced as the lead actress. Prakash Raj was dropped from the film and was replaced by Sachin Khedekar.

Maattrraan was officially launched on 22 July 2011 in Chennai. The film was shot in various places including the India-Pakistan border, and European countries like Latvia, Croatia, Serbia, Albania and Macedonia. Another large portion was filmed in sets erected at Ramoji Film City in Hyderabad. In February 2012, the team left for the United States to do special facial scanning led by VFX supervisor V. Srinivas Mohan. Maattrraan thus became the first Indian film to use performance capture technology. Isha Sharvani performed an item number titled 'Theeyae Theeyae' which was shot at AVM Studios, Chennai. Filming also took place at Wai, a village near Pune in Maharashtra. The song "Naani Koni" was shot in Norway in outdoor locations at Trollstigen, Geiranger, Atlanterhavsveien, Måløy and Aurlandsfjord. The climax was shot in Jodhpur, Rajasthan.

== Soundtrack ==
Harris Jayaraj composed the soundtrack album and background score for Maattrraan, in his third collaboration within K. V. Anand. It also marks his seventh collaboration with Suriya, after Kaakha Kaakha, Ghajini, Vaaranam Aayiram, Ayan, Aadhavan and 7 Aum Arivu. As per Anand's idea, he and Jayaraj sailed on a ship in the Mediterranean Sea where most of the songs were roughly composed. Harris chose Chennai-based singer-songwriter Mili Nair, who appeared in the MTV based Coke Studio, to provide vocals for the teaser theme. Mili, who had previously sung for jingles, rendered the English lyrics used in the theme, and also included in the song "Rettai Kathirae".

The album had lyrics written by Na. Muthukumar, Viveka, Pa. Vijay, Thamarai, Madhan Karky. The audio was mixed and mastered in the United States. Harris, in May 2012, revealed that 85% of work in the film's music was complete, and later stated that the audio would be released on 23 July 2012, coinciding with Suriya's birthday. However, Anand confirmed that the album would release in August. In June 2012, Sony Music acquired the audio rights. Later, Harris handed the master copy of the audio on 15 July 2012.

The makers announced that the audio launch of the film will take place on Singapore on 9 August 2012, which also coincided with the National Day of Singapore. The audio was released at the Singapore Expo in Singapore.

Karthik of Milliblog wrote, "Maatran scrapes through Harris’ time warp!" Music Aloud gave 6.5 out of 10 and stated, "Pretty much like their previous outing together, Harris Jayaraj produces one exceptional song for K V Anand in Maattrraan and the rest is average."

Maattrraan (Original Motion Picture Soundtrack)
| No. | Title | Lyrics | Singer(s) | Length |
|---|---|---|---|---|
| 1. | "Rettai Kathirae" | Na. Muthukumar | Krish, MK Balaji, Mili Nair, Sharmila | 4:50 |
| 2. | "Naani Koni" | Viveka | Vijay Prakash, Karthik, Shreya Ghoshal, Shekhinah Shwan Jazeel | 5:26 |
| 3. | "Theeye Theeye" | Pa. Vijay | Franco, Sathyan, Aalap Raju, Charulatha Mani, Suchitra | 5:23 |
| 4. | "Yaaro Yaaro" | Thamarai | Karthik, Priya Himesh | 5:35 |
| 5. | "Kaal Mulaitha Poovae" | Madhan Karky | Javed Ali, Mahalakshmi Iyer | 5:31 |
| Total length: | | | | 26:47 |

The soundtrack album of the Telugu version titled Brothers was released through Aditya Music. Initially, the audio was planned to release on 22 September 2012. But the audio release event for the film was held on 29 September 2012, at Taj Krishna Hotel in Hyderabad, with Karthi, Bellamkonda Suresh, V. V. Vinayak and Santhosh Srinivas, attending the event along with the cast and crew. Chandrabose and Vanamali penned the song lyrics.

Brothers (Original Motion Picture Soundtrack)
| No. | Title | Lyrics | Singer(s) | Length |
|---|---|---|---|---|
| 1. | "Rendai Thirigae" | Chandrabose | Deepu, Rahul Sipligunj, Sravana Bhargavi | 4:48 |
| 2. | "Rani Nanni" | Vanamali | Vijay Prakash, Karthik, Harini | 5:25 |
| 3. | "Neeve Neevelae" | Vanamali | Franco, Charulatha Mani, Aalap Raju | 5:21 |
| 4. | "Evaro Nenevaro" | Chandrabose | Karthik, Priya Himesh | 5:32 |
| 5. | "Kommalani" | Vanamali | Javed Ali, Mahalakshmi Iyer, Kousalya | 5:28 |
| Total length: | | | | 26:34 |

== Release ==
Eros International acquired the film's worldwide distribution rights in May 2012 and later announced that Maattrraan would release on 15 August 2012, coinciding with Independence Day. Later, the film's production company, AGS Entertainment confirmed that the film will be released on 12 October 2012. The film was dubbed in Telugu as Brothers, with Suriya's brother Karthi providing voiceover for one of Suriya's characters and Suriya voicing the other character.

Maattrraan was touted to become Suriya's biggest release to that point, which was released over 1,400 prints. The film opened in over 1,200 screens worldwide on the release date. In France, the film was released by Aanaa Films in 14 different screens across the country. In the United States, ATMUS Entertainment distributed the film in 63 centres, making it the widest release of a Tamil film in the country to that point. The film was cleared by the censor board on 3 October 2012.

== Marketing ==
The film's first teaser was released on 11 July 2012. The second teaser of the film was released on 9 August 2012, during the film's audio launch. The VFX making of the film was released on 18 September 2012. Ahead of the film's release, the makers refused to release a full-length trailer as the film was close to release; instead, they release 30-second promos on television channels.

== Reception ==
=== Critical reception ===
The Times of India gave the film 3.5 out of 5 stars, commenting that it had a "running time of close to three hours, and editor Anthony should have persevered with the director to reduce it as a lot of time is expended on scenes that could have been easily sacrificed to make it a much more compact package. Or maybe Anand also needed a Maattrraan (alternate) to step in when he lost his way". Sify commented: "If you are looking at a time pass entertainer, walk into K. V. Anand’s Maattrraan. It is a fun ride till interval and in the second half there is a neat message told with lot of cinematic liberties. Suriya holds the film together as the script tends to waver towards the climax". Pavithra Srinivasan of Rediff gave the film 2.5 out of 5 stars, saying it had a "great premise, great characters and actors who could have pulled off a complicated story. Sadly, the movie never capitalises on its strengths".

S Viswanath from Deccan Herald cited that "despite its interesting theme, the film is, however, done in by its rather long running time as also painfully sluggish first half seeking to establish the plot but brimming with comic capers", summing up that it was "an ensemble entertainer but could have been much better". Haricharan Pudipeddi of NowRunning gave the film 2.5/5 stars, stating that it "only promises the potential of Suriya, but fails to arouse interest due to its stretched second half and lacklustre narration". Malini Mannath of The New Indian Express claimed that the film, "with its whimsical screenplay and lackadaisical narration, turns out to be a huge disappointment", going on to add that it "smacks of overconfidence, and an utter disregard for the sense and sensibility of a viewer". J Hurtado of Twitch Film said, "Maatraan is two decent films split down the middle with little connective tissue to bind them, not unlike its protagonists" and concluded, "See it at your own risk".

In response to the mixed reviews, especially criticism towards the film's length, Maattrraan was edited down to a shorter runtime from its original two-hour-and-thirty-five-minute runtime. IANS reported that almost three minutes of the film's first half and over 20 minutes from the second half were trimmed. Anand, however, clarified that only 10 minutes overall were edited out.

=== Box office ===
Maattrraan collected ₹2.27 crore (US$240,000) in Chennai alone in its opening weekend. The film stayed in the first position for three consecutive weeks in Chennai but was later overtaken by Pizza at the Chennai box office. The film is reported to have completed a 50-day run in a few theatres across Tamil Nadu.

Maattrraan collected ₹69.20 lakh (US$74,000) in the UK and ₹86.11 lakh (US$92,000) in the United States in the opening weekend. The film overall collected ₹1.08 crore (US$120,000), and ₹1 crore (US$110,000) in UK and the US, respectively. The film also collected US$1,124,812 from Malaysia box office.

== Accolades ==
| Award | Category | Nominee | Result | Ref. |
|---|---|---|---|---|
| 7th Vijay Awards | Best Actor | Suriya | Nominated | |
| 7th Vijay Awards | Best Art Director | Rajeevan | Nominated | |
| 7th Vijay Awards | Best Stunt Director | Peter Hein | Nominated | |
| 7th Vijay Awards | Favorite Hero | Suriya | Nominated | |
| 2nd South Indian International Movie Awards | Best Director | K. V. Anand | Nominated | |
| 2nd South Indian International Movie Awards | Best Actor | Suriya | Nominated | |
| 2nd South Indian International Movie Awards | Best Actor in a Negative Role | Sachin Khedekar | Nominated | |
| 2nd South Indian International Movie Awards | Best Fight Choreographer | Peter Hein | Nominated | |
| 2nd South Indian International Movie Awards | Best Dance Choreographer | Brinda – "Rettai Kathire" | Nominated | |
| 10th BAF Awards | Special Jury Award for Best VFX | | | |

== Plagiarism allegations ==
When Maattrraan was touted to be the first Indian film based on conjoined twins, it created a stir after two other films with the same concept – Chaarulatha and Iruvan, were announced later. It was reported to have shared the same storyline as Chaarulatha, but Anand denied the reports and said, "After reading such reports, I watched the original version (Charulatha was based on 2007 Thai movie Alone). There isn't any connection between the two movies, except for the fact that the protagonists are conjoined twins." Later reports claimed that the film was inspired by another conjoined twins-themed film Stuck on You (2003), with the posters of both films also being described as similar to each other. Suriya denied this and said, "I have been seeing comments and links on social networking sites saying that Maattrraan is based on some world movie. Only after seeing those links, I came to know that such a film even exists!"

== Legacy ==
Vivek and Cell Murugan pretend to be conjoined twins in Killadi (2015) inspired by Akhilan and Vimalan from the film. The song "Rettai Kathirae" is reused. An internet meme began trending on social media platforms in late May 2020, in which Suriya's films were coincided with real life incidents, that happened around the world. Here, Russia's ban in 2018 Winter Olympics, was predicted in the film.
