= Mugamoodi =

2012 superhero film by Mysskin

- Theatrical release poster
- Directed by: Mysskin
- Written by: Mysskin
- Produced by: Ronnie Screwvala; Siddharth Roy Kapur
- Starring: Jiiva; Narain; Pooja Hegde
- Cinematography: Sathyan Sooryan
- Edited by: Gaugin
- Music by: Krishna Kumar
- Production companies: UTV Motion Pictures; Lone Wolf Productions
- Distributed by: UTV Motion Pictures
- Release date: 31 August 2012 (India)
- Running time: 162 minutes
- Country: India
- Language: Tamil

Mugamoodi (transl. Mask) is a 2012 Indian Tamil-language superhero film directed by Mysskin and produced by Ronnie Screwvala and Siddharth Roy Kapur. The film, which is dedicated to Bruce Lee, stars Jiiva, Narain and Pooja Hegde (in her film debut), alongside Nassar, Selva and Girish Karnad. In the film, Anand alias Bruce Lee, a martial artist, wears a superhero costume in order to impress his girlfriend Shakthi, but Anand gets framed for his friend Viji's death and sets out to prove his innocence by becoming a real superhero called Mugamoodi.

Principal photography began in December 2011 and took place in India, Switzerland, and other parts of Europe. The post-production involved the application of VFX. The music was composed by Krishna Kumar, while cinematography and editing were handled by Sathyan Sooryan and Gaugin.

Mugamoodi was released worldwide on 31 August 2012 to mixed to positive reviews from critics with praise for its cast performances, VFX, action sequences, direction and music, but criticised its script.

== Plot ==
Anand, alias Bruce Lee, is a college graduate living in Chennai. He studies martial arts with a group of unemployed friends, rejecting the idea of 9 to 5 jobs. While trying to recruit students to raise tuition fees and save their school, he becomes involved in a brawl and falls for Shakthi, the daughter of DCP Gaurav. Meanwhile, a series of robberies across the city leaves dozens dead and large sums of money stolen. Believing another robbery is imminent, the police begin an investigation. Lee's grandfather advises him to make Shakthi see him as a hero.

Lee borrows a superhero costume and introduces himself to Shakthi as Mugamoodi. While demonstrating his skills to children, he becomes caught in a police chase. He helps the police capture a bandit, but the gang kills the prisoner during his transfer. News of Mugamoodi's success, which surpasses the police's efforts to catch the gang, spreads throughout the city, and Shakthi begins to admire him. Gaurav then matches a crime-scene fingerprint with one in the police records.

Lee decides to meet Shakthi without his mask, intending to reveal his identity and confess his love. However, he encounters a gang member who shoots Gaurav. Although Lee disarms the gunman, the man escapes, and Gaurav's family assumes that Lee shot him. The police pursue Lee, who goes on the run. The gang kills Lee's friend Viji, and Lee is found alone beside the body, leading the police to suspect him of the murder. In response, Lee's grandfather and brother create a new superhero costume for him.

Gaurav survives, but the gang attacks the hospital to kill him and his family. Disguised as Mugamoodi, Lee defeats the attackers and takes Gaurav's case file, hoping to avenge Viji. The file's fingerprint evidence points to Lee's martial-arts teacher, Sifu (a fake martial arts a la kung fu) Chandru. Chandru denies involvement and reveals that Anguchamy, alias Dragon, is responsible. The two men trained at the same school 22 years earlier.

Dragon discovers that Mugamoodi is Lee and attacks Chandru's school, killing Chandru when Lee is absent. The gang then seizes a port and takes 30 children and three adults, including Shakthi, hostage. They demand a ship to carry them safely across the Indian border and order Mugamoodi to drive a van of gold alone. Lee agrees, leading to a fight with Dragon. Dragon unmasks him before Shakthi and admits that his brother Anthony shot Gaurav. With help from his grandfather and friends, Lee infiltrates the port and defeats key gang members. Dragon falls from a cliff after refusing Lee's attempt to save him. Lee frees the hostages, and Shakthi encourages him to continue as Mugamoodi.

== Cast ==
- Jiiva as Anand alias Bruce Lee/Mugamoodi
- Narain as Anguchamy alias Dragon
- Pooja Hegde as Shakthi, Anand's love interest (Voice dubbed by Savitha Reddy)
- Nassar as DCP Gaurav, Shakthi's father
- Selva as Sifu Chandru, Anand's teacher
- Girish Karnad as Anand's grandfather
- Aadukalam Naren as Anand's father
- Amalados
- Nicholas
- Joy
- Aadukalam Murugadoss as Anand's friend
- Kalaiyarasan as Viji, Anand's friend
- Thilsha
- Sivaraj
- Sachidanandam
- Ray as Shakthi's brother
- Vaishnavi as Shakthi's sister
- Anupama Kumar as Roshini, Shakthi's mother
- Meesha Ghoshal as a cop's wife
- Krishna Kumar as police commissioner (uncredited cameo appearance)

== Production ==
=== Development ===
In September 2008, it was reported that Suriya had signed a film titled Mugamoodi (Mask), which would be directed by Mysskin and produced by UTV Motion Pictures. It was reported that A. R. Rahman would compose the music for the film. The film was reported to be made on a budget of ₹35 crore, as it involved extensive computer graphics and visual effects. Suriya intended to learn martial arts for the film. In July 2009, Suriya opted out due to schedule conflicts, and it was reported that Vishal would play the role. As the project remained dormant, Mysskin moved on to script a horror film. Later, it was reported that Jiiva would play the main lead, who liked the concept.

The film was produced by Ronnie Screwvala and Siddharth Roy Kapur of UTV Motion Pictures. Mugamoodi was claimed to be the first superhero film in Tamil cinema.

=== Pre-production ===
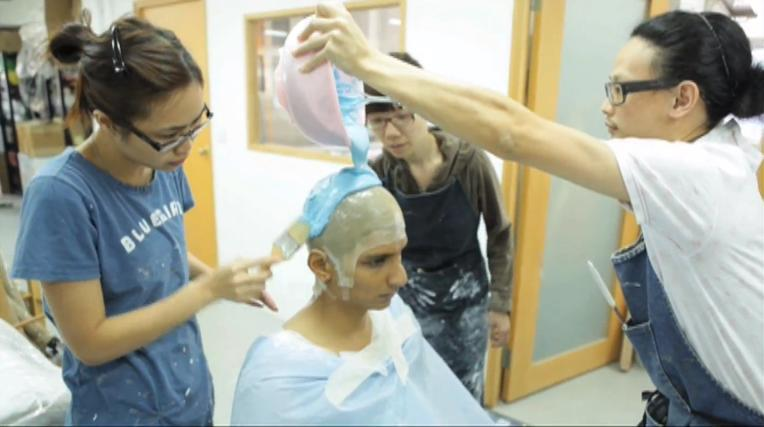
Jiiva during an 8-hour head casting session in Hong Kong for make up for his character Bruce Lee/Mugamoodi

Pre-production of the film began in late 2008. Mysskin started scripting the film after completing Nandalala (2010). In July 2011, it was reported that the makers began location scouting for the film. The shooting of the film was reported to start in late November 2011. Reports further claimed that Jiiva and Narain would undergo special training in martial arts with experts from the Shaolin Temple in China. In September 2011, it was reported that the lead casts would go to Bangkok to learn Kung Fu. Both Jiiva and Narain went through three months of Kung Fu training.

Mysskin revealed that the film will be made in his style, with tout-thrilling moments. "Taking into consideration that I am making an Indian film, I can’t showcase something that is impossible. I want my audience to accept my films and not make a joke of it. This is real cinema and I have shown what any superhero can exhibit in his zone," he added. The film was launched with a formal puja ceremony, which was held in December 2011 at Santhome school auditorium, Chennai.

K, who had scored for Mysskin's Yuddham Sei (2010), was selected as the film composer over two other music directors, while Madhan Karky would pen the lyrics, associating for the first time with Mysskin. Action sequences were choreographed by Tony Leung, who has worked with Bruce Lee and Jackie Chan action choreographers from Hong Kong. Other technicians includes cinematographer Sathyan Sooryan, editor Gaugin, dance choreographer Radhika, art director Bala, and costume designer Amritha Ram.

=== Casting ===
In October 2010, Arya signed on for the film with N. Lingusamy's Thirupathi Brothers production house replacing UTV as producers. However, within months, Arya had pulled out as had Lingusamy. In June 2011, a new Mumbai-based company had taken the production reins whilst Jiiva, after the commercial success of his political thriller Ko, had signed on to portray the lead role. Jiiva who plays Anand in the film would called as Bruce Lee in the film. Later that month, it was announced that Narain, who had worked with Mysskin in both Chithiram Pesuthadi and Anjathe, would portray the role of the lead antagonist in the film. The film was his highest paid film till then. Narain claimed that his villainy in the film would be totally brutal, where his character in the film has no shades and is absolutely negative. In early July 2011, it was reported that Amala Paul would portray the lead female character in the film, but, Dhananjayan of UTV confirmed that Amala was not approached for the role. Pooja Hegde, who is the second runner-up of the 2011 Miss Universe India, was eventually finalized as the female lead. Telugu actor Akkineni Nageswara Rao was added to the cast in November 2011, which proved false, and he was replaced by Girish Karnad, while Prakash Raj was also reported to be playing an important role. The following month, Nassar was selected to portray a police officer.

A large group of young aspiring artists were roped in to be part of the fight sequences which are touted be the highlight of the film. The artists were trained for over 6 months at Mansuria Kung Fu YMCA, Nandanam, Chennai. A lot of the kung fu content of the film were handled by R. Shekhar.

=== Effects and design ===
High-end gadgets to be used in the film were reportedly designed by consultant's from the IIT, while teams from the NIFT were roped in to create the costumes and looks of the characters. Furthermore, a Los Angeles-based firm would handle special effects of the film. The team travelled four countries to finalize the Jiiva's suits and finalized in Hong Kong. The costumes were designed by Gabriella Wilkins. Wilkins and her 10 assistants took six months to design the costume, including suit, mask, cap and the belt. A dozen suits and more than 30 different masks were created for the character, out of which Mysskin chose the best. Costume designer Amritha Ram also worked on Jiiva's costume, which weighs more than 10 kg.

=== Filming ===
The shooting of the film started officially on 12 December 2011, with the opening scene of kung fu as that was spoken about. The film is expected to be released during Summer 2012. The film was being canned in the nights in and around Triplicane in Chennai where the fight scene of Jiiva and Narain was shot in terrace. Mysskin is planning a 20-day schedule to shoot the climax at Karaikal. The shoot concluded at Karaikal where daredevil stunts were performed by the lead actor at an altitude of 180 feet high where in the Karaikal port's conveyor belt passes over. Many scenes were also filmed at AVM studio where huge hospital set was erected and also at Victoria hall, Deaf and Dumb school. Tony Leung Siu Hung, a stunt coordinator from Hong Kong, has joined the climax shoot of the film that is being canned in a massive scale at Karaikal in May 2012. The team moved to Europe to shoot two song at Alps in late July 2012. Later, the team moved to Switzerland to shoot a song and filming wrapped in early August 2012.

=== Post-production ===
Post-production for the film begin once the film completed its shooting and went for several months as the film involved extensive computer graphics and visual effects. A Los Angeles-based firm handled special effects of the film.

The final copy of the film was ready by mid August 2012, and was submitted to the Central Board of Film Certification (CBFC) that month. On 21 August 2012, the film received a U certificate from the Censor Board, with a finalized runtime of 162 minutes.

== Music ==
Mugamoodi's score and soundtrack were composed by K, who had worked on Mysskin's previous venture Yuddham Sei as well. The soundtrack features eleven tracks, including a number of instrumentals. The soundtrack album was released on 1 August 2012 at Sathyam Cinemas; it was presented by Vijay and received by Kannada actor Puneeth Rajkumar.

== Marketing ==
The first look and trailer launch of Mugamoodi took place on 29 June 2012 at Sathyam Cinemas, Chennai. The trailer was launched by Suriya and received by N. Lingusamy while the first look was released by Suriya and Gautham Vasudev Menon.

== Release ==
=== Theatrical ===
The film was released worldwide screens on 31 August 2012. The film was dubbed and released in Telugu as Mask and in Hindi as Mahabali Ek Super Hero. Mugamoodi was released in over 600 screens worldwide, with 23 in Chennai alone.

=== Distribution ===
In July 2012, it was reported that the film would be released simultaneously in Telugu and Hindi languages. Later, Jiiva's father R. B. Choudary acquired the Telugu dubbing rights of the film. The Telugu version titled Mask was released by Mega Super Good Films. The Hindu version titled Mahabali Ek Super Hero was distributed by UTV Motion Pictures.

=== Home media ===
The satellite rights of the film was acquired by Sun TV. The digital rights of the film were sold to Prime Video, Disney+ Hotstar and Sun NXT.

== Reception ==
=== Critical response ===
Mugamoodi received mixed to positive reviews from critics with praise for its cast performances, VFX, action sequences, direction and music, but criticised its script.

The Times of India gave 3.5/5 stars and wrote "The fact remains that Mugamoodi is not as taut as the director’s earlier works."

R. S. Prakash of Mumbai Mirror gave 2.5/5 stars and wrote "In comparison, the film’s first half is better than the second. The opening scenes are deadly till the director opts for a different route to tell the tale."

Pavithra Srinivasan of Rediff gave 2/5 stars and wrote "Mugamoodi has all the makings of a successful film but ends up disappointing." IBNLive cited that the film had a "different flavour" and wrote "For those who love the West and East's action films, Mugamoodi combines both to give some pleasure."

Malathi Rangarajan of The Hindu noted that it "travels on a terrain that’s new to Tamil cinema" and wrote "Mysskin's effort to make Mugamoodi appear as authentic as possible deserves to be commended." Sify termed it as average and wrote "Mugamoodi is a one-time watch for Mysskin and Jiiva’s attempt to do something different. It has very good music and background score by K, but lacks a proper script and a racy presentation."

=== Box office ===
Mugamoodi had higher occupancy on its opening day. The film grossed ₹10 crores in 3 days of its release. The Tamil and Telugu versions alone got ₹9 crores in India, with ₹2 crores from Andhra Pradesh. The film was also well received at Malaysia. The film was box office success at the end of its theatrical run.

== Accolades ==
Award (Note: Awards, festivals and organizations are in alphabetical order.)	Date of ceremony (Note: Date is linked to the article about the awards held that year, wherever possible.)	Category	Recipient(s)	Result	Ref.
Ananda Vikatan Cinema Awards	16 January 2013	Best Debut Actress	Pooja Hegde	Nominated	
South Indian International Movie Awards	12–13 September 2013	Best Female Debutant – Tamil	Pooja Hegde	Nominated	
South Indian International Movie Awards	12–13 September 2013	Best Actor in a Negative Role – Tamil	Narain	Nominated	
Filmfare Awards South	20 July 2013	Best Female Debut	Pooja Hegde	Nominated	
Edison Awards	10 February 2013	Best Playback Singer – Male	Aalap Raju (for "Vaayamoodi Summa Iru Da")	Won	
Vijay Awards	11 May 2013	Best Villain	Narain	Nominated	
Vijay Awards	11 May 2013	Best Debut Actress	Pooja Hegde	Nominated	
Vijay Awards	11 May 2013	Favourite Heroine	Pooja Hegde	Nominated	
Vijay Awards	11 May 2013	Best Costume Designer	Gabreilla Wilkins	Nominated	
Vijay Awards	11 May 2013	Favourite Song	"Vaayamoodi Summa Iru Da"	Nominated	
Norway Tamil Film Festival Awards	24–28 April 2013	Best Newcomer Actress	Pooja Hegde	Won	
Maa Music Awards	16 June 2013	Best Dubbing Song	"Gadiyaram"	Won	
Big Tamil Melody Awards	19 August 2013	Best Singer (Male)	Aalap Raju (for "Vaayamoodi Summa Iru Da")	Nominated	

== Potential sequel ==
Reports of a planned sequel of Mugamoodi began surfacing prior to the film's release, stating Mysskin planned to release sequels every year. Later, the reports suggested that Mysskin had the script of Mugamoodi 2, with same casts part of it. Later, it was reported that the film would be shot bigger in scale, in 3D. Jiiva said in an interview that he will do the sequel only if the makers find a lighter and friendlier costume.
