= Radhika (choreographer) =

Indian choreographer

Radhika (Choreographer)
- Born: Chennai, Tamil Nadu, India
- Occupation: Film choreographer
- Years active: 1992–present

Radhika is an Indian choreographer. She works predominantly in Tamil, Telugu, Hindi, Kannada and Malayalam films. She learned dance from Uduppi Lakshman Narayan starting at the age of six. Radhika started her career at age 12 as a dancer in the movie Thalattu directed by T.K.Rajendran. Radhika has 20 years of experience in dance choreography. She worked with Tarun Kumar, Brinda, Raju Sundaram, Chinni Prakash, and Raghava Lawrence. She has worked on more than 100 films. Her first independent film was Mugamoodi, directed by Mysskin. She choreographed all the songs in this film.

== Filmography ==
=== 2012 and 2013 projects ===
Year	Film	Language	Release date
2012	Mugamoodi	Tamil	August 2012
2012	Azhagan Azhagi	Tamil	April 2012
2012	Nandeesha	Kannada	December 2012
2012	Sattam Oru Iruttarai	Tamil	December 2012
2012	Kurumbukara pasanga	Tamil	January 2013
2013	Thulli Vilayadu	Tamil	June 2013
2013	Oruvar meethu iruvar sainthu	Tamil	April 2013
2013	Mariyan	Tamil	July 2013
2013	Ainthu Ainthu Ainthu	Tamil	August 2013
2013	Soothattam	Tamil	October 2013

=== 2014 projects ===
Year	Film	Language	Director	Notes
2014	Mega	Tamil	Filming	Rishi Karthik
2014	Peralai	Tamil	Completed	G K
2014	Sigaram Thodu	Tamil	Completed	Gaurav Narayanan
2014	Naanthan Da	Tamil	Filming	Ramgopal Varma
2014	panivizhum nilavu	Tamil	Completed	Koushik
2014	Karisalpatti Gandhi nagaram	Tamil	Filming	Karthik Murugan
2014	Punnagai Payanam	Tamil	Completed	Jaya krishna
2014	Jaaki	Tamil	Filming	Ravi Rajan
2014	kangaroo	Tamil	Filming	Saami
2014	Azhagu Magan	Tamil	Filming	Azhagu Selvan
2014	Nandaraa	Kannada	Filming	Shyam
2014	Vettri	Tamil	Filming	Parthiban
2014	Muyal	Tamil	Filming	Yuvan
2014	Vinyaani	Tamil	Filming	Parthi
2015	Tharai thappattai	Tamil	Filming	Bala
2015	Nambiar	Tamil	Filming	Ganeshaa
2015	Meendum oru kathal kathai	Tamil	Filming	Mithran Jawahar
2015	Thru v ka poonga	Tamil	Filming	Senthilnathan
2015	Thiruttuvcd	Tamil	Filming	Sugumar
2015	Panju mittai	Tamil	Filming	S.P. Mohan
2015	Nathikal nanaivathillai	Tamil	Filming	Anbalagan
2015	Ponge Ezhu Manohara	Tamil	Filming	Ramesh Rangasamy
2015	Manitha Kadhal Alla	Tamil	Filming	Agni
2015	Romeo Juliet	Tamil	Filming	Lakshman
2015	Vetri	Tamil	Filming	Parthiban
2015	School Campuz	Tamil	Filming	RJ Ramanarayana
