= 7th Vijay Awards =

Indian film awards ceremony in 2013

- Awarded for: "Excellence for cinematic achievements in Tamil cinema"
- Sponsored by: Gionee India
- Date: 11 May 2013
- Location: Chennai, Tamil Nadu
- Country: India
- Presented by: Close-Up; STAR Vijay
- Hosted by: R. Madhavan; Gobinath
- Reward: Statuette
- First award: 2006
- Website: www.vijayawards.in

Television/radio coverage
- Network: STAR Vijay

The 7th Vijay Awards ceremony honoring the best of the Tamil film industry in 2012 was held on 11 May 2013 at the Jawaharlal Nehru Indoor Stadium in Chennai, India. It was hosted by Gopinath and R. Madhavan.

== Jury ==
The jury members were directors Vetrimaran, Venkat Prabhu and Cheran, comedian Yugi Sethu, and cinematographer R. Rathnavelu.

== Award winners and nominees ==
Best Film	Best Director
Vazhakku Enn 18/9	Balaji Sakthivel - Vazhakku Enn 18/9; AR Murugadoss - Thuppakki; Magizh Thirumeni - Thadaiyara Thaakka; Prabhu Solomon - Kumki; S. S. Rajamouli - Naan Ee
Best Actor	Best Actress
Dhanush - 3; Suriya - Maattraan; Vijay - Thuppakki; Vijay Sethupathi - Naduvula Konjam Pakkatha Kaanom; Vikram - Thaandavam	Samantha - Neethaane En Ponvasantham; Kajal Aggarwal - Thuppakki; Shruti Haasan - 3; Sunaina - Neerparavai; Viji Chandrasekhar - Aarohanam
Best Supporting Actor	Best Supporting Actress
Sathyaraj - Nanban; Maarimuthu - Aarohanam; Naren - Sundarapandian; Pasupathi - Aravaan; Samudrakani - Saattai	Anupama Kumar - Muppozhudhum Un Karpanaigal; Nandita Das - Neerparavai; Radhika Apte - Dhoni; Saranya Ponvannan - Oru Kal Oru Kannadi; Vidyullekha Raman - Neethane En Ponvasantham
Best Comedian	Best Villain
Santhanam - Oru Kal Oru Kannadi; Karunas - Kazhugu; Sathyan - Nanban; Soori - Sundarapandian; VTV Ganesh - Podaa Podi	Sudeep - Naan E; Muthuraman - Vazhakku Enn 18/9; Narain - Mugamoodi; Thambi Ramiah - Saattai; Vidyut Jamwal - Thuppakki
Best Debut Actor	Best Debut Actress
Vikram Prabhu - Kumki; Sivakarthikeyan - Marina; Dinesh - Attakathi; Udhayanidhi Stalin - Oru Kal Oru Kannadi; Sri - Vazhakku Enn 18/9	Varalaxmi Sarathkumar - Podaa Podi; Lakshmi Menon - Sundarapandian; Manisha Yadav - Vazhakku Enn 18/9; Pooja Hegde - Mugamoodi; Urmila Mahanta - Vazhakku Enn 18/9
Best Music Director	Best Cinematographer
D. Imman - Kumki; Anirudh Ravichander - 3; Harris Jayaraj - Nanban; Ilaiyaraaja - Neethane En Ponvasantham; Yuvan Shankar Raja - Kazhugu	Gopi Amarnath - Pizza; Prem - Naduvula Konjam Pakkatha Kaanom; Vijay Milton - Vazhakku Enn 18/9; Siddharth - Aravaan; Sukumar - Thadaiyara Thaakka
Best Editor	Best Art Director
Kotagiri Venkateswara Rao - Naan Ee; A. Sreekar Prasad - Thuppakki; Gopi Krishna - Vazhakku Enn 18/9; Leo John Paul - Pizza; Praveen K. L.-N. B. Srikanth - Thadaiyara Thaakka	R. K. Vijay Murugan - Aravaan; Muthuraj - Nanban; Rajeevan - Maattraan; Sunil Babu - Thuppakki; Vairabalan - Kumki
Best Male Playback Singer	Best Female Playback Singer
Mohit Chauhan - "Po Nee Po" (3); Dhanush - "Why This Kolaveri Di" (3); Gaana Bala - "Nadukadalula" (Attakathi); Haricharan - "Ayyayyo" (Kumki); Vijay Prakash - "Asku Laska" (Nanban)	Ramya NSK - "Satru Munbu" (Neethaane En Ponvasantham); Shruti Haasan - "Kannazhaga" (3); Shweta Pandit - "Idhayam" (Billa II); Sithara - "Kangal Neeye" (Muppozhudhum Un Karpanaigal); Sunidhi Chauhan - "Mudhal Murai" (Neethaane En Ponvasantham)
Best Lyricist	Best Story, Screenplay Writer
Thamarai - "Kangal Neeye" (Muppozhudhum Un Karpanaigal); Dhanush - "Po Nee Po" (3); Gaana Bala - "Nadukadalula" (Attakathi); Na. Muthukumar - "Oru Paadhi" (Thaandavam); Yugabharathi - "Sollitalae" (Kumki)	Karthik Subbaraj - Pizza; Balaji Sakthivel - Vazhakku Enn 18/9; Balaji Tharaneetharan - Naduvula Konjam Pakkatha Kaanom; Rajesh - Oru Kal Oru Kannadi; S. S. Rajamouli - Naan Ee
Best Background Score	Best Dialogue
Yuvan Shankar Raja	Rajesh - Oru Kal Oru Kannadi; Anbazhagan - Saattai; Gautham Vasudev Menon - Neethane En Ponvasantham; Iyappan - Madhubaanakadai; Prabhu Solomon - Kumki
Best Choreographer	Best Stunt Director
Robert - "Love Panlama Venama" (Podaa Podi); Dinesh - "Venaam Machan" (Oru Kal Oru Kannadi); Farah Khan - "Irukkana" (Nanban); Shobi - "Antarctica" (Thuppakki); Sridhar - "Alaikka Laikka" (Thuppakki)	Anal Arasu - Thadaiyara Thaakka; Kecha - Thuppakki; Peter Hein - Maattrraan; Rajasekhar- Muppozhudhum Un Karpanaigal; Silva - 3
Best Make Up	Best Costume Designer
Sarath Kumar - Aravaan	S. Rajendran - Aravaan; Gabreilla Wilkins - Mugamoodi; Ganesh - Kumki; Kunal Rawal, Deepali Noor, Sai - Nanban; Vinesh Arora, Sarin - Podaa Podi
Best Find of the Year	Best Crew
Anirudh Ravichander - 3	Pizza
Best Debut Director	Face of the Year
Balaji Tharaneetharan - Naduvula Konjam Pakkatha Kaanom; Anbazhagan - Saattai; Karthik Subbaraj - Pizza; Lakshmi Ramakrishnan - Aarohanam; Prabhakaran - Sundarapandian	Udhayanidhi Stalin - Oru Kal Oru Kannadi; Dinesh - Attakathi; Lakshmi Menon - Sundarapandian; Sivakarthikeyan - Marina; Varalaxmi Sarathkumar - Podaa Podi; Vikram Prabhu - Kumki
Contribution to Tamil Cinema	Chevalier Sivaji Ganesan Award for Excellence in Indian Cinema
Bharathiraja	Shahrukh Khan
Entertainer of the Year	Special Jury Awards
Vijay - Nanban / Thuppakki	Vijay Sethupathi (Actor); Trisha (Actress); Aarohanam (Film)

=== Favorite Awards ===
Favorite Hero	Favorite Heroine
Vijay - Thuppakki; Ajith Kumar - Billa 2; Dhanush - 3; M. Sasikumar - Sundarapandian; Surya - Maattrraan	Kajal Agarwal - Thuppakki; Pooja Hegde - Mugamoodi; Ileana D'Cruz - Nanban; Samantha Ruth Prabhu - Neethaane En Ponvasantham; Shruti Haasan - 3
Favorite Film	Favorite Director
Thuppakki; Naan E; Nanban; Oru Kal Oru Kannadi; Sundarapandian	AR Murugadoss - Thuppakki; N. Lingusamy - Vettai; Rajesh - Oru Kal Oru Kannadi; S. S. Rajamouli- Naan E; Shankar - Nanban
Favourite Song
"Google Google" - Thuppakki; "Sollitaaley" - Kumki; "Vaayamoodi Summa Iru Da" - Mugamoodi; "Venaam Machan" - Oru Kal Oru Kannadi; "Why This Kolaveri Di" - 3	

=== Multiple nominations ===
The following eighteen films received four nominations or more:

Nominations	Film
15	Thuppakki
11	Oru Kal Oru Kannadi
10	Nanban
10	Kumki
9	Vazhakku Enn 18/9
8	3
7	Sundarapandian
6	Naan Ee
6	Neethaane En Ponvasantham
5	Pizza
5	Podaa Podi
5	Attakathi
4	Muppozhudhum Un Karpanaigal
4	Naduvula Konjam Pakkatha Kaanom
4	Thadaiyara Thaakka
4	Aarohanam
4	Maattraan
4	Saattai

The following thirteen films received multiple awards:

Awards	Film
6	Thuppakki
3	Pizza
3	Aravaan
3	3
3	Oru Kal Oru Kannadi
2	Vazhakku Enn 18/9
2	Neethaane En Ponvasantham
2	Nanban
2	Muppozhudhum Un Karpanaigal
2	Naan E
2	Podaa Podi
2	Kumki
2	Naduvula Konjam Pakkatha Kaanom
