= Ennamo Yeadho =

2011 song

"Enamo Yeadho"

Song by Harris Jayaraj (composer), Aalap Raju, Prashanthini, Sricharan, Emcee Jesz (performers)

from the album Ko
- Language: Tamil
- Released: 12 January 2011
- Recorded: 2010
- Genre: Feature film soundtrack
- Length: 5:36
- Label: Sony Music
- Songwriters: Composer: Harris Jayaraj; Lyrics: Madhan Karky; Sricharan; Emcee Jesz
- Producer: Harris Jayaraj

Enamo Yeadho (transl. Something random) is a song from the 2011 Indian Tamil film Ko, composed by Harris Jayaraj. The song was performed by Aalap Raju, Prashanthini, Sricharan, Emcee Jesz, with lyrics written by Madhan Karky, Sricharan, and Emcee Jesz. The song was released as part of the soundtrack album of the film on 12 January 2011. The song, which has also been referred to as "Kuviyamilla" (transl. Out of focus) by the media, was initially released with a thirty-second teaser trailer of the film on 5 November 2010, coinciding with Diwali to positive response.

== Production ==
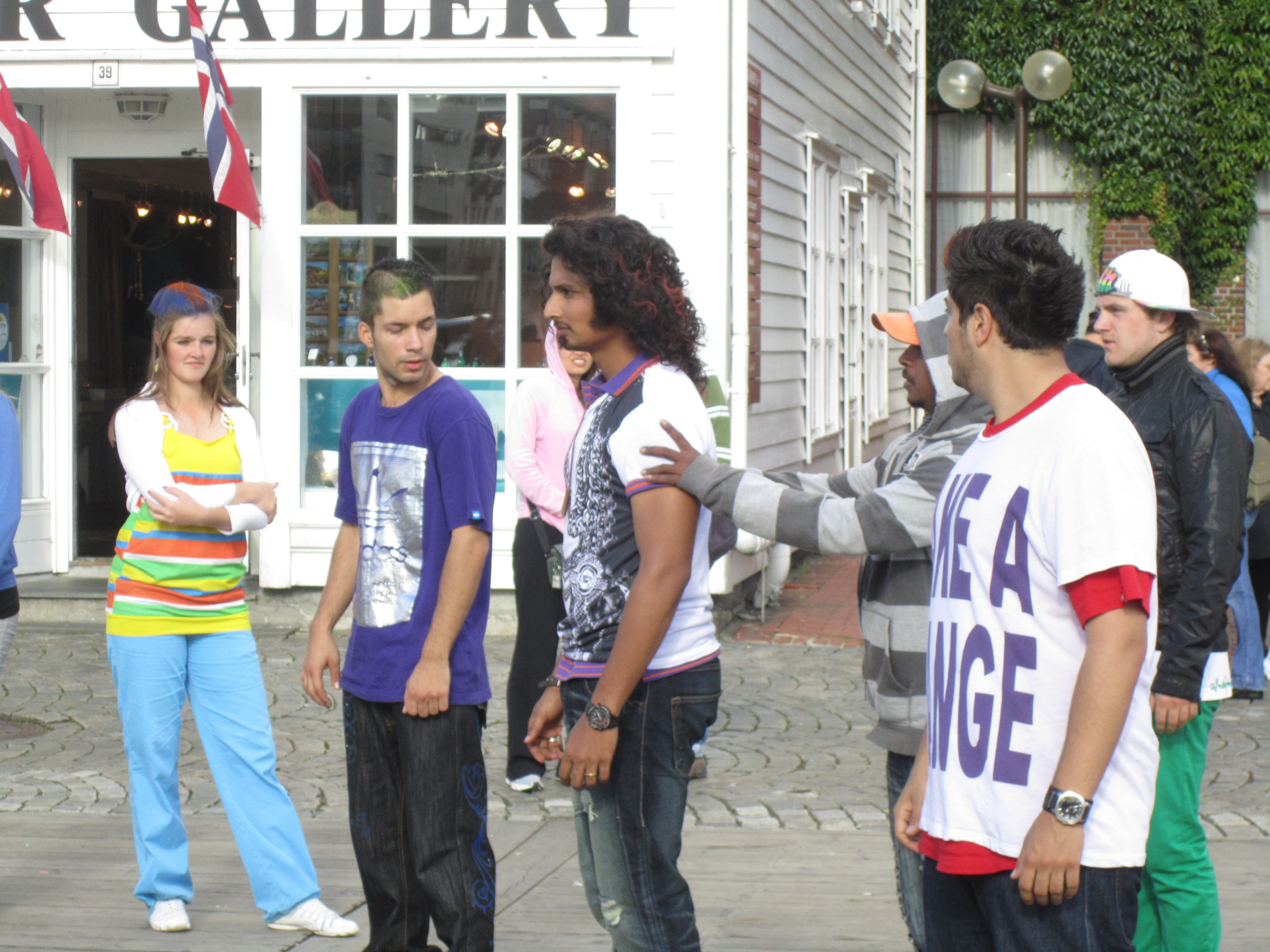
Jeeva during the filming of the song in Bergen, Norway

The lyrics of the song were written by Madhan Karky, whose work won critical acclaim even prior to the release of the audio. He went on to explain that the term "Kuviyamilla" featured in the song meant "out of focus" in Tamil and it reflected the occupation of the lead character in the film, who plays a photo journalist. The song was sung by a leading bass guitar player in Chennai, Aalap Raju, who initially believed Harris Jayaraj had called him just to play the guitar for the song. The song was predominantly sung by him, whilst Prashanthini, Sricharan and Emcee Jesz also performed back vocals with the latter singing English lyrics. The song appears in the film featuring Ashwin (played by Jiiva) singing the tune as well as through montage scenes. The song depicts the character's love for Renuka (Karthika Nair), whilst Saro (Piaa Bajpai) shows affection for him. The song was shot in regions in Norway as well as across Chennai.

== Release ==
The song was released as a part of the soundtrack album which was launched on 12 January 2011, at the Image Auditorium in Chennai, with the presence of the film's cast and crew, and other celebrities, which was followed by a press meet the following day, at the Green Park Hotel in Chennai. The audio event was telecasted on Kalaignar TV on 26 January 2011, coinciding with Republic Day.

== Response ==
The teaser trailer's success prompted the media to claim that the audio soundtrack to the film was "red hot" with reports indicating the pull of the particular song. Initial response dubbed the song as "catchy and cute" with another reviewer claiming that it was set to be "easily the chartbuster of the collection". The song topped the Tamil music charts for months.

After the release of the film, the song won further acclaim from critics, with Pavithra Srinivasan of Rediff.com citing it as the "obvious pick from the album" and Indiaglitz.com agreeing with the statement.

== Accolades ==
The song was honored with the Vijay Award for Favourite Song, the Mirchi Music Award for Best Song and the Vijay Music Award for Most Popular Song in 2011. The singer of the song, Aalap Raju, won many awards for his playback singing, most notably being the Filmfare Award for Best Male Playback Singer – Tamil.

== Other versions ==
The Telugu version, "Enduko Emo" written by Vanamali was also popular and won the Maa Music Award for Best Dubbing Song in 2012. Brahmanandam performed a parody of the song in the Telugu film Naayak (2013).
