= Aalap Raju =

Indian playback singer and bass guitarist

- Born: 6 June 1979 (age 47)
- Genres: Pop; indie; rock; jazz; fusion
- Occupations: Playback singer; bass guitarist
- Instruments: Bass guitar; acoustic guitar
- Years active: 2010–present

Aalap Raju (born 6 June 1979) is a playback singer and a bass guitar player from Chennai, India. His rendition of "Enamo Aedho" from the movie Ko composed by Harris Jayaraj topped the music charts for several months in 2011 and won him the Filmfare Award for Best Male Playback Singer – 2011. He has sung for music directors like Harris Jayaraj, Thaman, G.V Prakash, Deepak Dev, D.Imman, Sreekanth Deva and many more. His other noticeable songs include "Vaayamoodi Summa Iru Da" from Mugamoodi, "Engeyum Kadhal" from Engeyum Kadhal, "Endhan Kann Munnae" from Nanban, "Kadhal Oru Butterfly" and "Akila Akila" from Oru Kal Oru Kannadi, Anjana Anjana from Vandhan Vendran, Kuthu Kuthu from Ayyanar, "Nenjodu Cherthu" from Yuvvh, "Theeyae Theeyae" from Maattrraan, "Jal Jal Osai" from Manam Kothi Paravai, and "Maya Bazaar" from Yennai Arindhaal.

He is also a bass guitar player and has collaborated with leading composers in Kollywood, Mollywood and Bollywood. One of his notable Bollywood collaborations was with Shankar–Ehsaan–Loy for the movie Raazi, where he played bass guitar on the track "Dilbaro." He has performed in over 1000 live shows, including film, fusion, and television shows.

== Early life ==
Music was something that was natural to him since he hails from a musical family. His parents, J. M. Raju and Latha Raju, are playback singers in Malayalam while his grandmother, late Smt. Santha P. Nair and grandfather, late K. Padmanabhan Nair were well known names in the Malayalam music industry in 60s and 70s. Though in his school days he wanted to become a professional cricketer and represent India in the International level, his under graduation days at SVCE (Chennai) had other plans for him. His college mates inspired him to take up singing and bass guitar in parallel in his last year. Months of practice made Aalaap a self-taught musician in playing bass guitar and singing, Aalaap's name spread through the most prestigious cultural events in India especially 'Saarang' (hosted by Indian Institute of Technology (IIT), Chennai) where he was awarded 'Best Instrumentalist' for his bass guitar playing. And that was the starting point of numerous recording sessions and live performances in India and abroad. His singing took more prominence once Ennamo Yedho and Engeyum Kadhal released in 2011, composed by Harris Jayaraj. Aalaap now concentrates on singing and bass guitar playing equally in studios and live.

== Career ==
As a singer and bass guitar player, Aalaap has performed with several prominent artists such as Dr. T.V. Gopalakrishnan, Dr. L. Subramaniam, Frank Dubier, etc., and has recorded with noticeable composers such as Ilayaraja, Harris Jayaraj, Shankar Ehsaan Loy, Mani Sarma, G.V Prakash, Thaman, Deepak Dev etc.

He has been part of the prestigious Europalia Festival '13 (hosted by ICCR India: Indian Council for Cultural Relations), as a bass guitar player for Dr. L. Subramaniam covering countries like Italy, Netherlands, Belgium, Spain, Russia, Sweden, Latvia and Iceland.

Aalaap was a member of Project YUJ, a four-piece Neo-Carnatic-Funk band featuring electric mandolin, electric bass guitar, keyboards, and acoustic drums. Derived from the Sanskrit word meaning "to join" or "to concentrate," the band's name reflects its goal of blending varied musical influences. Drawing on the members' background in different styles, the group incorporates improvisation into its performance.

He was also part of a duo multi-genre band called Rahlaap along with playback singer Rahul Nambiar. Rahlaap has released their self-titled multi-genre album. Available in music portals like iTunes, Amazon, Hummaa, etc.

Aalaap is now an active member of bands like MAKKA (feat. Playback singers Ranjith Govind and Rahul Nambiar), his own line up called Aalaap Raju & Band (ArB) and Sean Roldan & Friends.

== Awards ==
- Filmfare Award for Best Male Playback Singer - Tamil – "Enamo Aedho" for Ko
- Edison Award for Best Male Playback Singer – "Enamo Aedho" for Ko
- Vijay Award for Song of the Year (for Enamo Aedho) – 2011
- Radio Mirchi Award for Song of the Year (for Enamo Aedho) – 2011
- Edison Award for Best Singer – 2011
- Chennai Times Award for Best Singer – 2011
- Screen Moon Award for Best Singer – 2011
- Kannadasan Award for Best Debutant Singer – 2011
- Big FM Rising Star Award for Best Singer – 2011
- Jaya Award for Best Debutant Singer – 2011
- V4 Shivaji – MGR Award for Best Singer – 2011
- Big FM Best Melody Singer Award – Tamil – 2013
- Big FM Best Melody Singer Award (Independent Music) – Malayalam – 2013

== Discography ==
Year	Film	Song	Language	Music director	Co-singers
2010	Bale Pandiya	"Happy"	Tamil	Devan Ekambaram	Various
2010	Engeyum Kadhal	"Engeyum Kadhal"	Tamil	Harris Jayaraj	Devan Ekambaram, Ranina Reddy
2010	Ayyanar	"Kuthu Kuthu"	Tamil	S. Thaman	Bruce Lee, Velmurugan
2011	Thambikottai	"Unakkanka Uireyvaithen"	Tamil	D. Imman	Sriram Parthasarathy, Shweta Mohan
2011	Ko	"Enamo Aedho"	Tamil	Harris Jayaraj	Prashanthini, Sricharan, Emcee Jesz
2011	Rangam (D)	"Endhuko Emo"	Telugu	Harris Jayaraj	Prashanthini, NC Karunya, Sri Krishna, Malavika, Sreeram Chandra, Sunitha Upadrashta, Sricharan, Emcee Jesz
2011	Vanthaan Vendraan	"Anjana Anjana"	Tamil	S. Thaman	
2011	Vanthaan Vendraan	"Thirandhen Thirandhen"	Tamil	S. Thaman	Shreya Ghoshal
2011	Vachadu Gelichadu	"Anjana Anjana"	Telugu	S. Thaman	
2011	Vachadu Gelichadu	"Ichale Ichale"	Telugu	S. Thaman	
2011	Soolam	"Simhanthania"	Telugu	Bharadwaj	
2011	Nanban	"Endhan Kan Munney"	Tamil	Harris Jayaraj	
2011	Kandireega	"Naakodithey"	Telugu	S. Thaman	Naveen, M. L. R. Karthikeyan, Ranjith, Ranina Reddy, Dharshana
2011	Mudhal Idam	"Pappara Pappara"	Tamil	D. Imman	Priya Subramaniam, Ananthu
2011	Kaantham	"Tamizhanban"	Tamil	Prathap	
2011	Kattupuli	"Thaamarai Pookkaley"	Tamil	Vijay Verma	
2011	Businessman	"Katakulla Mumbai"	Tamil	S. Thaman	Ranjith, Rahul Nambiar, Naveen
2011	Businessman	"Aamchi Mumbai"	Telugu	S. Thaman	Ranjith, Rahul Nambiar, Naveen
2011	Businessman	"Aaj Mumbai"	Malayalam	S. Thaman	Ranjith, Rahul Nambiar, Naveen
2011	Businessman	"Sir Unnu"	Malayalam	S. Thaman	
2011	Music Beyond Genres	"Aankh Mein Aab Hai"	Hindi	Rahlaap	
2011	Music Beyond Genres	"Mil Baitaein Hain Yaar"	Hindi	Rahlaap	
2012	Yuvvh	"Nenjodu Cherthu"	Malayalam	Sreejith S & Sachin	
2012	Snehithudu (D)	"Toli Adugaina Padalede"	Telugu	Harris Jayaraj	
2012	Oru Kal Oru Kannadi	"Kaadhal Oru"	Tamil	Harris Jayaraj	Hemachandra, Sunitha Sarathy
2012	Oru Kal Oru Kannadi	"Akila Akila"	Tamil	Harris Jayaraj	Chinmayi, Sharmila
2012	Ninnu Choosthe Love Vasthundi	"Ennallugano"	Telugu	Harris Jayaraj	
2012	Muppozhudhum Un Karpanaigal	"Mazhai Pozhiyum"	Tamil	G. V. Prakash Kumar	G. V. Prakash Kumar, Megha
2012	Manam Kothi Paravai	"Jal Jal Jal Oosai"	Tamil	D. Imman	Surmukhi Raman
2012	Thadaiyara Thaakka	"Kelamalae"	Tamil	S. Thaman	Rita
2012	Sridhar	"Siruvan Sirumiyai"	Tamil	Rahulraj	Rita
2012	Sridhar	"Oh! Oh! My Friend"	Tamil	Rahulraj	
2012	OKOK (D)	"Just Like"	Telugu	Harris Jayaraj	Hemachandra, Sunitha Sarathy
2012	OKOK (D)	"Akhilaa Akhilaa"	Telugu	Harris Jayaraj	Chinmayi, Sharmila
2012	Mugamoodi	"Vaayamoodi Summa Iru Da"	Tamil	Krishna Kumar	
2012	Mask (D)	"Gadiyaram"	Telugu	Krishna Kumar	
2012	Maattrraan	"Theeyae Theeyae"	Tamil	Harris Jayaraj	Franco Simon, Charulatha Mani, Sathyan, Suchitra
2012	Brothers	"Neeve Neeve"	Telugu	Harris Jayaraj	Franco Simon, Charulatha Mani
2012	101 Weddings	"Muthodu Mutham"	Malayalam	Deepak Dev	
2012	Sundattam	"Naru Naru Narumugaye"	Tamil	Britto	Madhumitha
2013	Sillunu Oru Sandhippu	"Adi Aathi"	Tamil	Faizal	Anitha
2013	Pani Vizhum Nilavu	"Enna Pannuvaen"	Tamil	L V Ganesan	
2013	Chandamama	"Yaarodi"	Tamil	Srikanth Deva	Srimathumitha
2013	Nagarpuram	"Mazhaiyae Mazhaiyae"	Tamil	Arhul Dhev	
2013	Machan	"Yenachu Yethachu"	Tamil	Srikanth Deva	
2013	Aadalam Boys Chinnatha Dance	"Poradalaam Poradalaam"	Tamil	Sachin Jigar	
2013	Buddy	"Ukulele"	Malayalam	Navneeth Sundar	B.Shrinivas
2013	Endrendrum Punnagai	"Vaan Engum Nee Minna"	Tamil	Harris Jayaraj	Harini, Devan Ekambaram, Praveen
2014	Vaayai Moodi Pesavum	"Udaigiraen"	Tamil	Sean Roldan	
2014	Samsaaram Aarogyathinu Haanikaram	"Kaana Kanneerilae"	Malayalam	Sean Roldan	
2014	Ennathan Pesuvatho	"Adada Adada"	Tamil	D. Imman	
2015	Yennai Arindhaal...	"Maya Bazaar"	Tamil	Harris Jayaraj	Krishna Iyer, Priya Subramanian, Velmurugan
2015	Indru Netru Naalai	"Indru Netru Naalai"	Tamil	Hiphop Tamizha	Shankar Mahadevan
2015	Inimey Ippadithan	"Thaedi Odunaen"	Tamil	Santhosh Dhayanidhi	Santhosh Dhayanidhi
2016	Vetrivel	"Adhuva Idhuva"	Tamil	D. Imman	
2018	Sketch	"Dhiname Dhinanme"	Tamil	S. Thaman	Vineeth Sreenivasan, Mukesh, Shabareesh Varma
