= Vijay Award for Favourite Song =

Award category

The Vijay Award for Favorite Song is given by STAR Vijay as part of its annual Vijay Awards ceremony for Tamil (Kollywood) films. The award is chosen through public voting. Harris Jayaraj has been the most frequent winner with three wins .

== The list ==
Here is a list of the award winners and the films for which they won.

| Year | Song | Film | Composer | Link |
|---|---|---|---|---|
| 2017 | "Aalaporaan Thamizhan" | Mersal | A. R. Rahman | |
| 2014 | "Amma Amma" | Velaiyilla Pattathari | Anirudh Ravichander | |
| 2013 | "Oootha Colouru Ribbon" | Varuthapadatha Valibar Sangam | D Imman | |
| 2012 | "Google Google" | Thuppakki | Harris Jayaraj | |
| 2011 | "Enamo Aedho" | Ko | Harris Jayaraj | |
| 2010 | "En Kadhal Solla" | Paiyaa | Yuvan Shankar Raja | |
| 2009 | "Chinna Thamarai" | Vettaikaaran | Vijay Antony | |
| 2008 | "Ava Enna" | Vaaranam Aayiram | Harris Jayaraj | |

== Nominations ==
- 2008 Harris Jayaraj Anjala from Vaaranam Aayiram
  - Harris Jayaraj - Mundhinam Parthene from Vaaranam Aayiram
  - Harris Jayaraj - Nenjukkul Peidhidum from Vaaranam Aayiram
  - James Vasanthan - Kangal Irandal from Subramaniapuram
  - Himesh Reshammiya - Kallai Mattum from Dasavathaaram
- 2009 Vijay Antony - Chinna Thamarai from Vettaikaaran
  - Harris Jayaraj - Vizhi Moodi from Ayan
  - Harris Jayaraj - Hasili Fisili from Aadhavan
  - Yuvan Shankar Raja - Oru Kal from Siva Manasula Sakthi
  - Vijay Antony - Aathichoodi from TN 07 AL 4777
- 2010 Yuvan Shankar Raja - En Kadhal Solla from Paiyaa
  - A. R. Rahman - Kilimanjaro from Enthiran
  - Devi Sri Prasad - Kaadhal Vandhaale from Singam
  - A. R. Rahman - Hosanna from Vinnaithaandi Varuvaayaa
  - G. V. Prakash Kumar - Un Mela Aasadhaan from Aayirathil Oruvan
- 2011 Harris Jayaraj - Enamo Aedho from Ko
  - G. V. Prakash Kumar - Kadhal En Kadhal from Mayakkam Enna
  - G. V. Prakash Kumar - Otha Sollaala from Aadukalam
  - S. Thaman - Kalasala from Osthe
  - Yuvan Shankar Raja - Vilaiyaadu Mankatha from Mankatha
- 2012 Harris Jayaraj - Google Google from Thuppakki
  - Anirudh Ravichander - Why This Kolaveri Di from 3
  - D. Imman - Sollitaley Ava Kaadhala from Kumki
  - Harris Jayaraj - Venaam Machan from Oru Kal Oru Kannadi
  - Krishna Kumar - Vaayamoodi Summa Iru Da from Mugamoodi
- 2013 D Imman - Oootha Colouru Ribbon from Varuthapadatha Valibar Sangam
  - Anirudh Ravichander - "Ethir Neechaladi" from Ethir Neechal
  - A. R. Rahman - "Nenjukulle" from Kadal
  - G. V. Prakash Kumar - "Hey Baby" from Raja Rani
  - Santhosh Narayanan - "Kaasu Panam" from Soodhu Kavvum
- 2014 Anirudh Ravichander - "Amma Amma" from Velaiyilla Pattathari
  - D Imman - "Koodamela Koodavechu" from Rummy
  - Anirudh Ravichander - "Selfie Pulla" from Kaththi
  - Santhosh Narayanan - "Naan Nee" from Madras
  - Harris Jayaraj - "Aathangara Orathil" from Yaan

== See also ==
- Tamil cinema
- Cinema of India
