= Fog (disambiguation) =

Fog is a visible mass consisting of cloud water droplets or ice crystals suspended in the air at or near the Earth's surface.

Fog or FOG may also refer to:

== Poetry and books ==
- "Fog" (poem), by Carl Sandburg
- The Fog, a 1921 novel by William Dudley Pelley
- Fog, a 1933 novel by Valentine Williams and Dorothy Rice Sims
- Fog, a 1934 non-fiction work by Alexander McAdie
- The Fog (novel), a 1975 British horror novel by James Herbert
- The Fog, a novelization of the 1980 film by Dennis Etchison
- The Fog, a 1989 novel by Caroline B. Cooney, the first installment in the Losing Christina series
- The Fog, a 2015 novel by Alton Gansky, the eighth installment in the Harbingers series
- The Fog, a 2017 children's picture book by Kyo Maclear

== Film and television ==
- The Fog (1923 film), 1923 American silent drama film directed by Paul Powell
- Fog (1932 film), a French Spanish-language drama
- Fog (1933 film), an American pre-Code film
- The Fog (1980 film), a 1980 American horror film
  - The Fog (soundtrack)
- Dhund: The Fog, a 2003 Indian thriller film
- The Fog (2005 film), an American-Canadian remake of the 1980 horror film
- "The Fog" (Mad Men), a 2009 episode of the American television series

=== Music ===
- Fog (band), an American indie rock band and hip-hop group
- "Fog", a song by Radiohead released as a B-side of the 2001 single "Knives Out"
  - "Fog (Again)", a song by Radiohead released on the 2004 compilation Com Lag
- "Fog", a song by Italian death metal band Sadist from Lego
- "The Fog", a song by English singer Kate Bush from her 1989 album The Sensual World
- Mgła (English: Fog), a Polish black metal band

== People ==
- Fog (surname), list of people with the surname
- Fog (comics), fictional characters from DC Comics

== Places ==
- Fog Bay, Antarctica
- Fog Bay, Northern Territory, Australia
- Fog Bay and Finniss River Floodplains, Australia
- Foggia "Gino Lisa" Airport, Italy
- Forest Gate railway station, England

== Science and engineering ==
- Fats, Oils and Grease (FOG); see Grease trap
- FOG1, friend of GATA1, a protein encoded by the ZFPM1 gene
- Distance fog, a technique in 3D rendering
- Fibre optic gyroscope
- Fog computing
- Gunning fog index, a measure of text readability
- FOG Project

== Other uses ==
- Fear, obligation and guilt, emotional blackmail
- FOG Inc., a Japanese video game developer
- Forward Observations Group, a US military lifestyle brand, active in Ukraine
- Full On Games, a Japanese video game developer

== See also ==
- Fogg (disambiguation)
- Fogge (disambiguation)
- Fogging (disambiguation)
- Phog (disambiguation)
- London fog (disambiguation)
- San Francisco fog
- Clouding of consciousness, phrase often time called "brain fog" or "mental fog"
