= Fogg (surname) =

Fogg is a surname. Notable people with the name include:

== People ==
- Alan Fogg,
- Angus Fogg,
- B. J. Fogg, American psychologist and computer scientist
- Billy Fogg,
- Clarence J. Fogg,
- Dave Fogg,
- David Fogg,
- Daniel Fogg,
- E. Knowlton Fogg,
- Ellis D Fogg,
- Eric Fogg (1903–1939), English composer and conductor
- George G. Fogg (1813–1881), American diplomat and politician
- Gordon Elliott Fogg,
- Howard L. Fogg (1917–1996), American artist
- John Fogg (born 1944), American politician
- Josh Fogg (born 1976), American baseball pitcher
- Karen Fogg, British diplomat
- Kevin Fogg,
- Kirk Fogg, American game show host
- Kyle Fogg,
- Laurence Fogg,
- Martyn J. Fogg (born 1960), British physicist and terraforming researcher
- Mieczysław Fogg (1901–1990), Polish singer
- Mr. Fogg,
- Peter Fogg,
- Rodney D. Fogg,
- Ron Fogg,
- William Perry Fogg,

== Fictional characters ==
- Phileas Fogg, the protagonist of Jules Verne's Around the World in Eighty Days
- Madeline Fogg, from Ludwig Bemelman's book series Madeline
- Marco Fogg, the protagonist of Paul Auster's novel Moon Palace
