= Fog Bay =

Fog Bay may refer to:

- Fog Bay, Antarctica
- Fog Bay, a bay in Australia - refer Dundee Beach, Northern Territory
- Fog Bay and Finniss River Floodplains, Northern Territory, Australia
