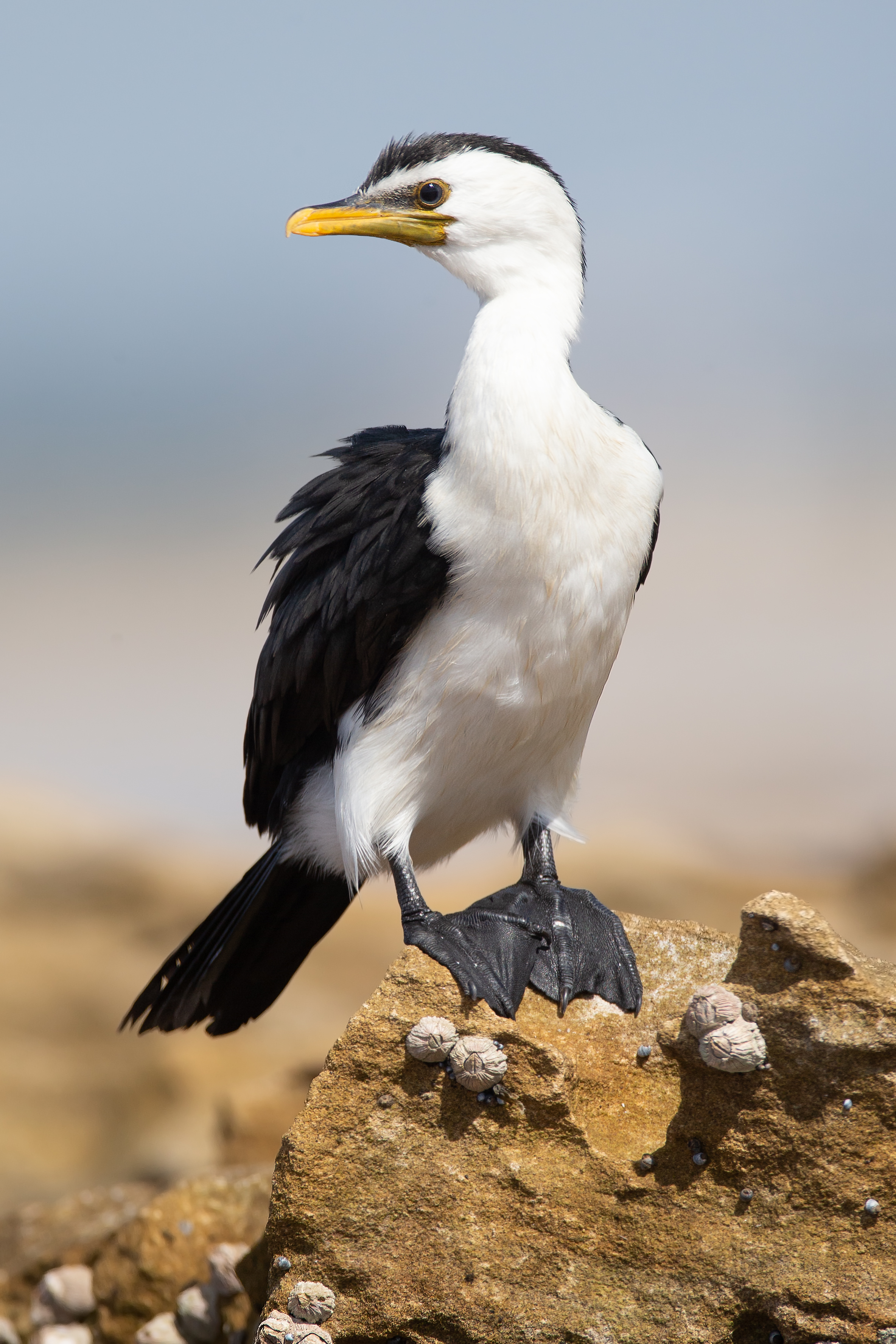
- In New South Wales
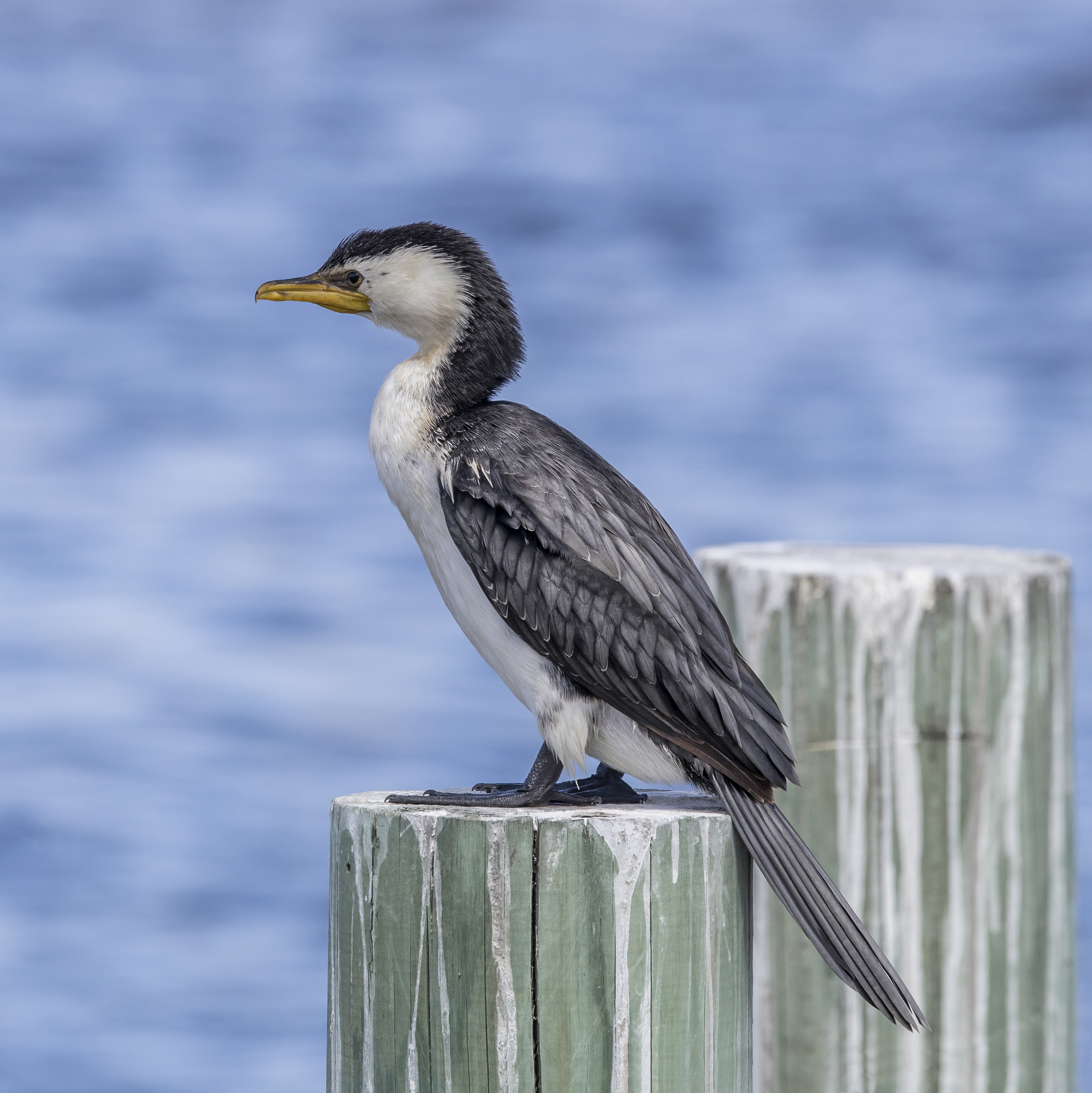
- In Tasmania

Conservation status
- Least Concern (IUCN 3.1)

Scientific classification
- Kingdom: Animalia
- Phylum: Chordata
- Class: Aves
- Order: Suliformes
- Family: Phalacrocoracidae
- Genus: Microcarbo
- Species: M. melanoleucos

Binomial name
- Microcarbo melanoleucos (Vieillot, 1817)
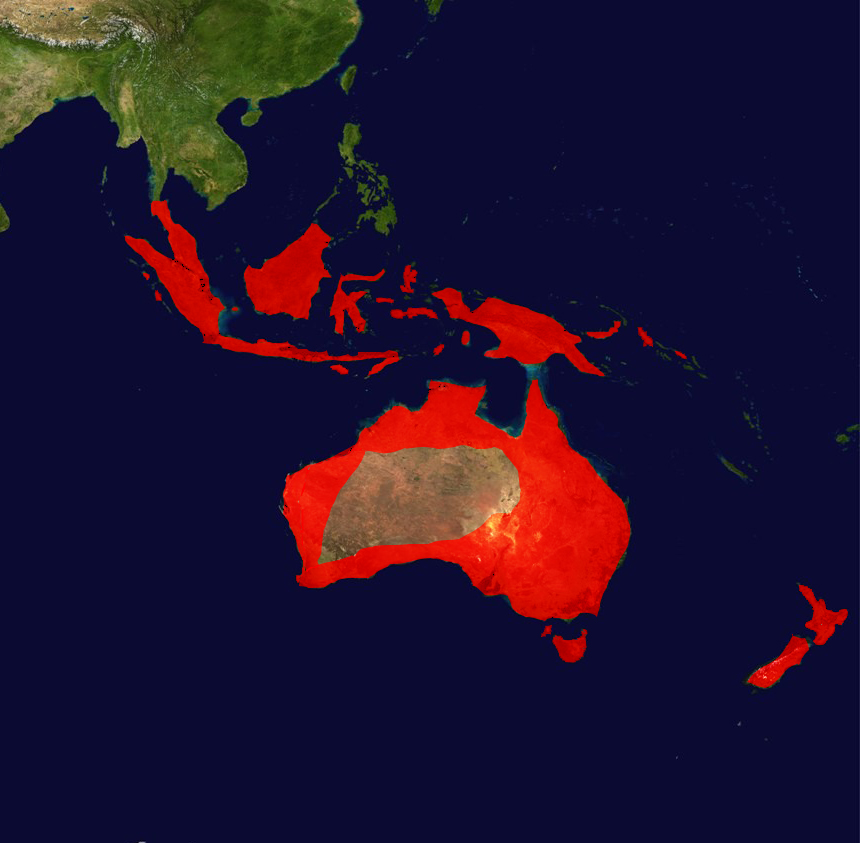
- Range of the little pied cormorant

Synonyms
- Phalacrocorax melanoleucos Anhinga parva Nanocorax melanoleucos

= Little pied cormorant =

Species of bird

The little pied cormorant, little shag or little pied shag (Microcarbo melanoleucos) (Māori: kawaupaka) is a common species of Australasian waterbird, found around the coasts, islands, estuaries, and inland waters of Australia, New Guinea, New Zealand, Timor-Leste and Indonesia, and around the islands of the south-western Pacific and the subantarctic. It is a small short-billed cormorant usually black above and white below with a yellow bill and small crest, although a mostly black white-throated form predominates in New Zealand. Three subspecies are recognised. Until recently, most authorities referred to this species as Phalacrocorax melanoleucos.

== Taxonomy ==
The species is known as the little pied cormorant in Australia, and as the little shag or by the Māori name of kawaupaka in New Zealand. The term white-throated shag is also reserved for the melanistic form there.

The little pied cormorant was originally described by French naturalist Louis Pierre Vieillot in 1817. In 1931, American ornithologist James Lee Peters was the first to consider this in a separate genus along with the pygmy cormorant (M. pygmaeus), little cormorant (M. niger), and the long-tailed cormorant (M. africanus). Since then, molecular work by Sibley and Ahlquist showed the little pied and long-tailed cormorants formed a group which had diverged early on from other cormorants. This group of "micro-cormorants" assumed the genus name Microcarbo, initially described by French naturalist Charles Lucien Bonaparte in 1855. The generic name is derived from the Ancient Greek mikros "small", and Latin carbo "black". However, most older authorities refer to this species as Phalacrocorax melanoleucus.

In the now-extinct Waray language spoken along the Adelaide River in North Arnhem Land, the species was known as mawa.

Three subspecies are commonly recognised:

- M. m. melanoleucos. Resident throughout the species range except in New Zealand and the sub-Antarctic islands
- M. m. brevicauda Mayr 1931. Endemic to Rennell Island, in the Solomon Islands
- M. m. brevirostris Gould 1837 (little shag). Resident throughout New Zealand and regularly seen on sub-Antarctic islands; has bred on Campbell Island. Some authorities treat this form as a distinct species, P. brevirostris.

== Description ==
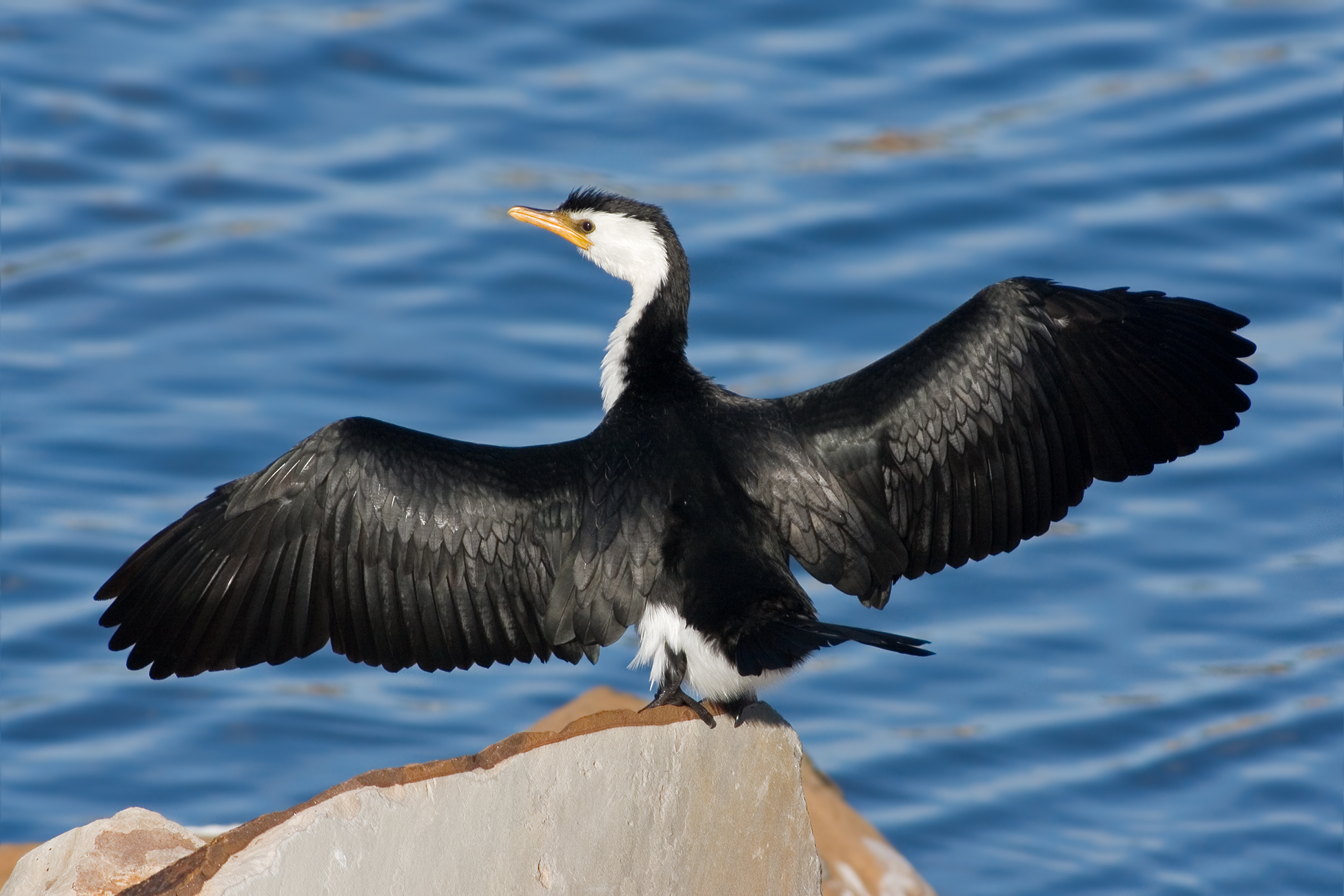
Wing drying pose

The little pied cormorant is a small cormorant measuring 56–58 cm (22–23 in) with a shorter 3 cm (1.2 in) bill and longer tail than the little black cormorant; it has a small black crest. It is found in two morphs in New Zealand. Subspecies melanoleucos and brevicauda are found only in a pied morph, black (with a slight green tinge) above and white beneath. This is also found in subspecies brevirostris, but in this form the melanistic morph is much more common. In this form the entire plumage is black with a greenish tinge except for the sides of the head, chin, throat and upper neck; the bill is yellow with black on top. Intermediate forms are also found.

The pied form is glossy black above with white face, underparts and thighs. The bill and bare skin around the face are yellow. In both forms the legs and feet are black. The pied form is rare in New Zealand, and is most common there in Northland, where it makes up one in every four birds or so.

Chicks have dark brown down, with pied morph having patches of paler down. Immature birds are a dull blackish brown, with pied morph birds having paler underparts.

The little pied cormorant makes a low cooing during courtship.

Similar species include the black-faced cormorant (slightly larger) and the Australian pied cormorant (substantially larger).

== Distribution and habitat ==
The species ranges across New Zealand, from Stewart Island to Northland, and across mainland Australia (although not in the arid interior of the west of the country) and Tasmania. It is also present in Papua New Guinea, Palau, Timor-Leste, the Solomon Islands, New Caledonia, and Vanuatu. In eastern Indonesia, the little pied cormorant's range includes Sulawesi, the Lesser Sunda Islands, Maluku Islands, and Western New Guinea, with non-breeding birds recorded in Java, Bali, and once off the coast of East Kalimantan. Widespread and common, it lives near bodies of water such as swamps, lakes, lagoons, estuaries and the coastline.

== Feeding ==
The little pied cormorant is a benthic feeder, i.e. it finds its prey on the sea floor. It is a solitary feeder, normally diving in relatively shallow water, often near the shore. Dive times are short, around 15 to 20 seconds, with recovery times on the surface of 5 to 10 seconds unless prey are being swallowed. It takes a variety of fish prey but an unusually high proportion (nearly 30% by weight on average, and up to 80% in some individuals) of crustaceans. In New Zealand waters it is most often seen preying on the local flounder and other small flatfish. Eels and insect larvae are also consumed. These are brought to the surface to be swallowed: the bird will sometimes put a fish down on the surface of the water in order to re-orient it and swallow it head first. Because of this habit, they suffer some kleptoparasitism from red-billed gulls.

== Breeding ==
Breeding occurs once a year in spring or early summer in southern areas of its range (southern Australia and New Zealand), and after the monsoon in tropical regions. The nest is a platform built of branches and sticks, often still green with leaves in the forks of trees, usually eucalypts that are standing in water. Nests are often located near other waterbirds such as other cormorants, herons, ibises or spoonbills. Four or five pale blue oval eggs measuring 46 x 31 mm are laid. The eggs are covered with a thin layer of lime, giving them a matte white coated appearance. They become increasingly stained with faeces, as does the nest, over the duration of the breeding season.

== Gallery ==
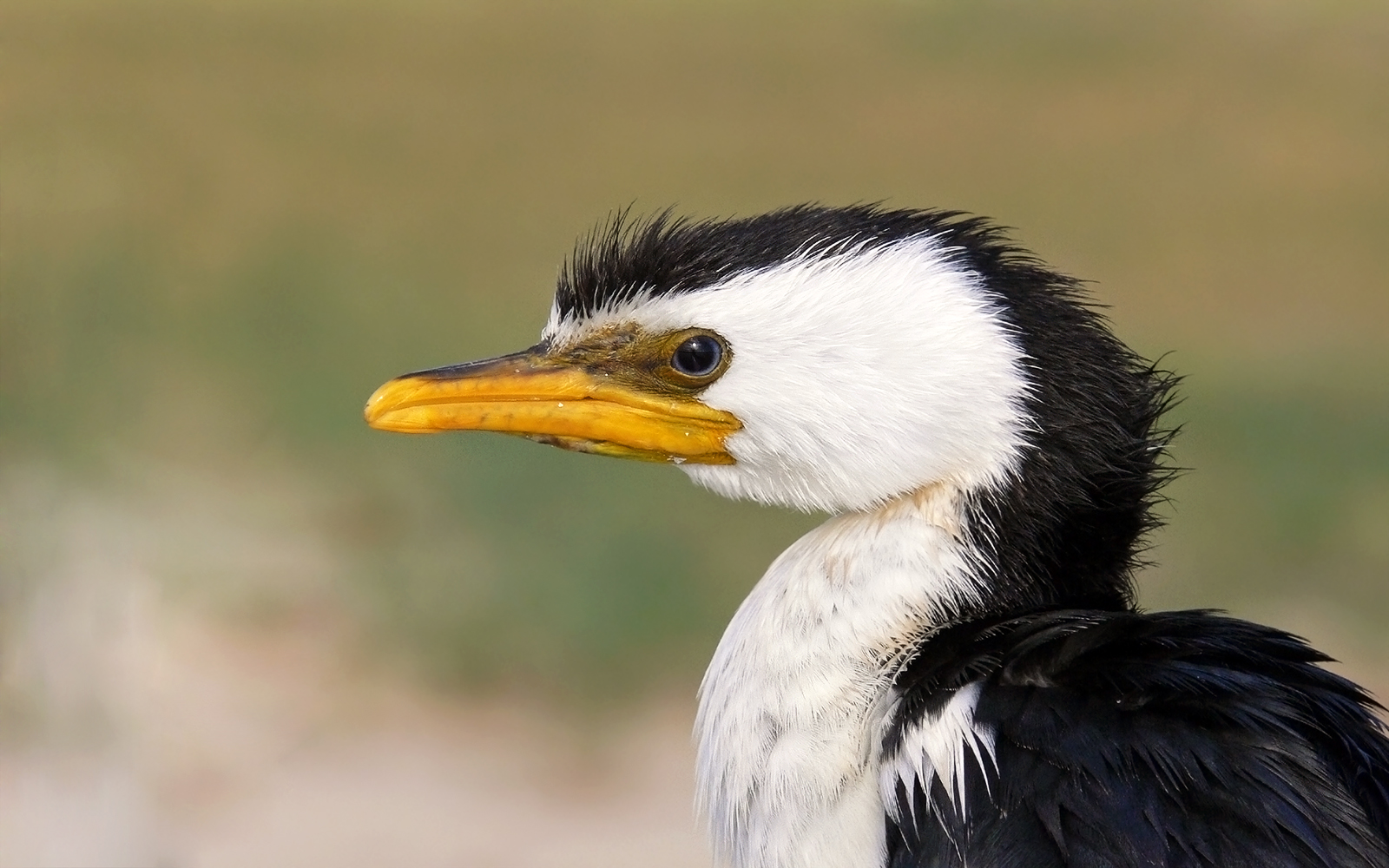
Close-up of the head

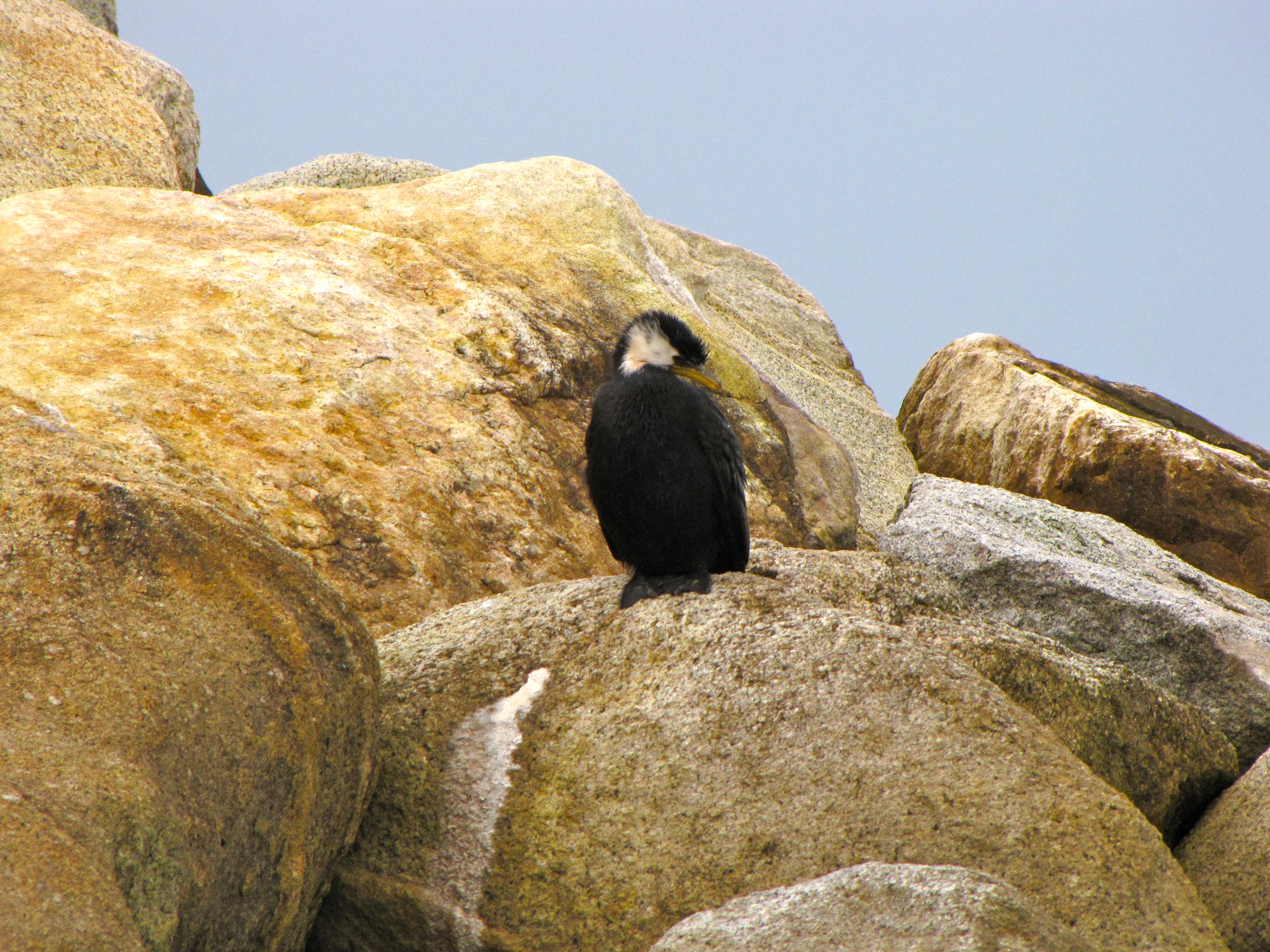
Melanistic morph, New Zealand

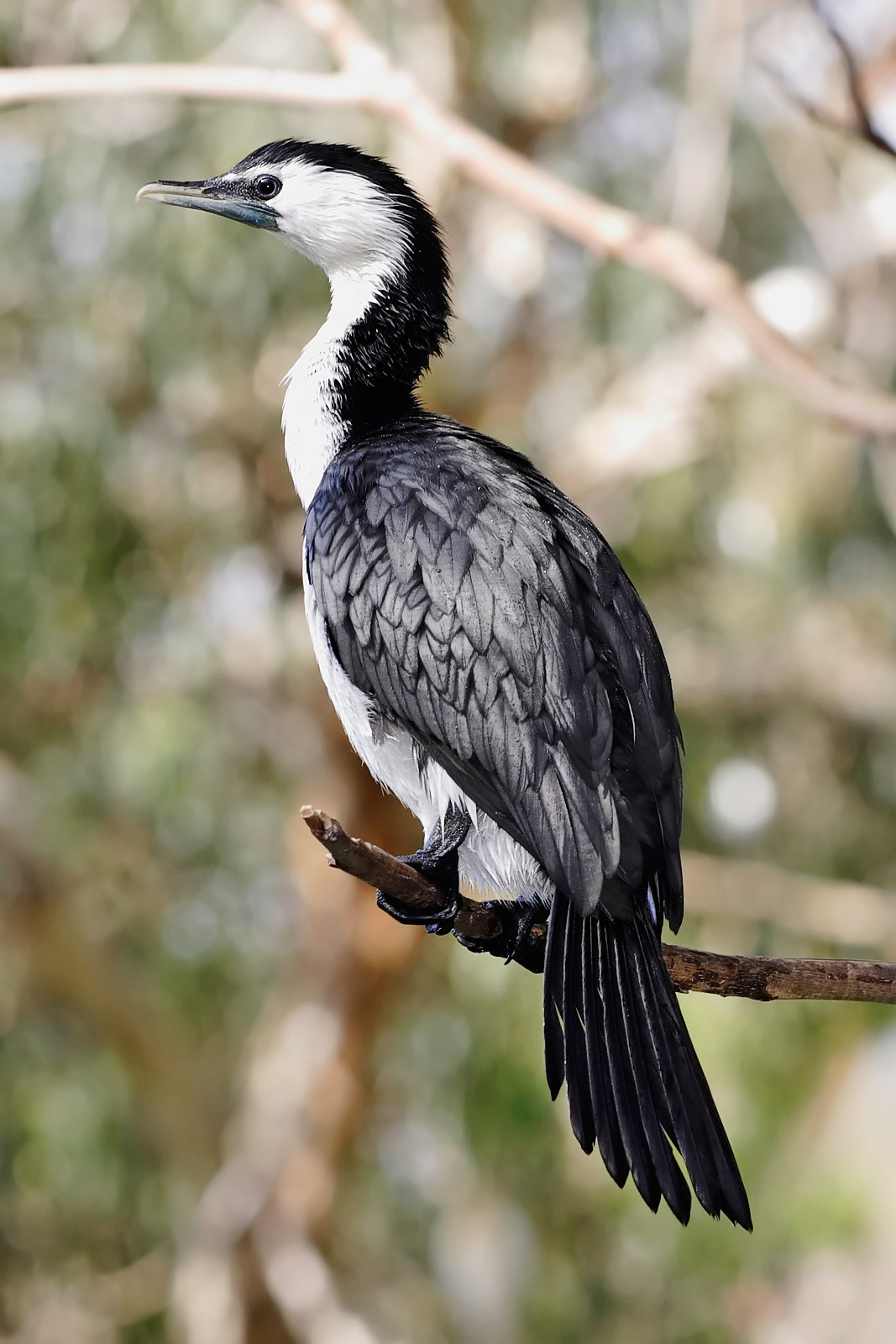
An individual with a dark bill, atypical of little pied cormorants

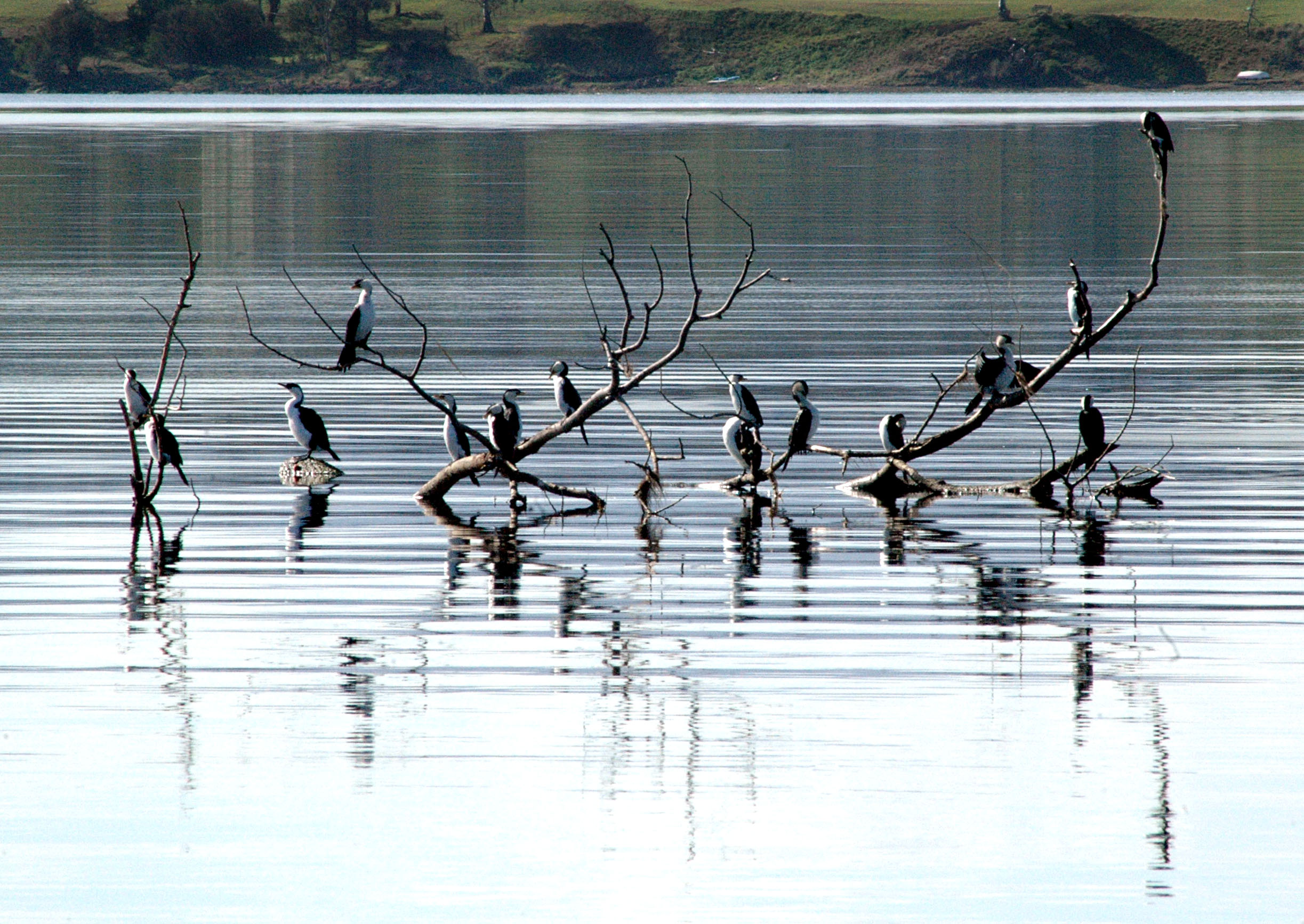
Roosting, Tasmania

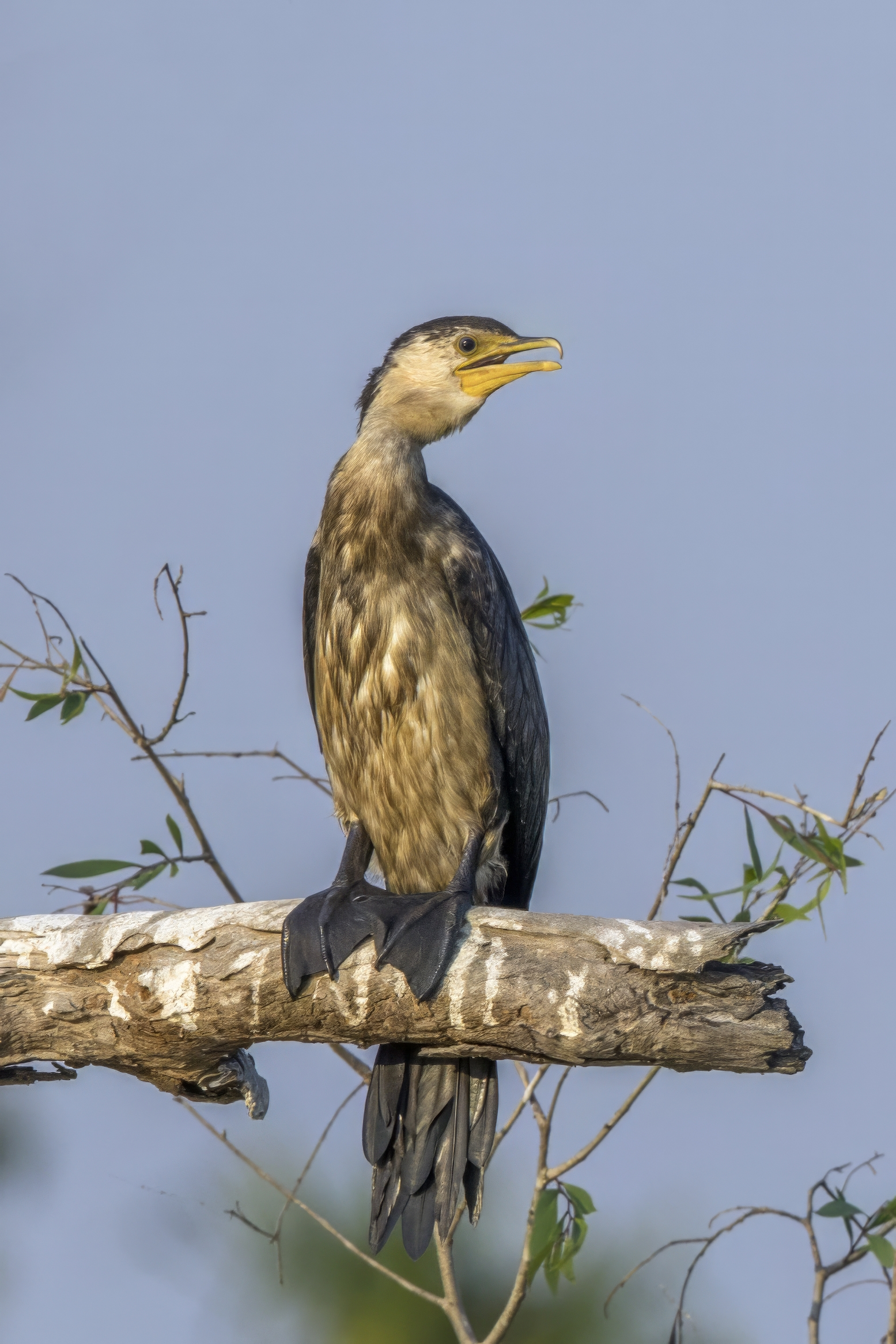
Immature

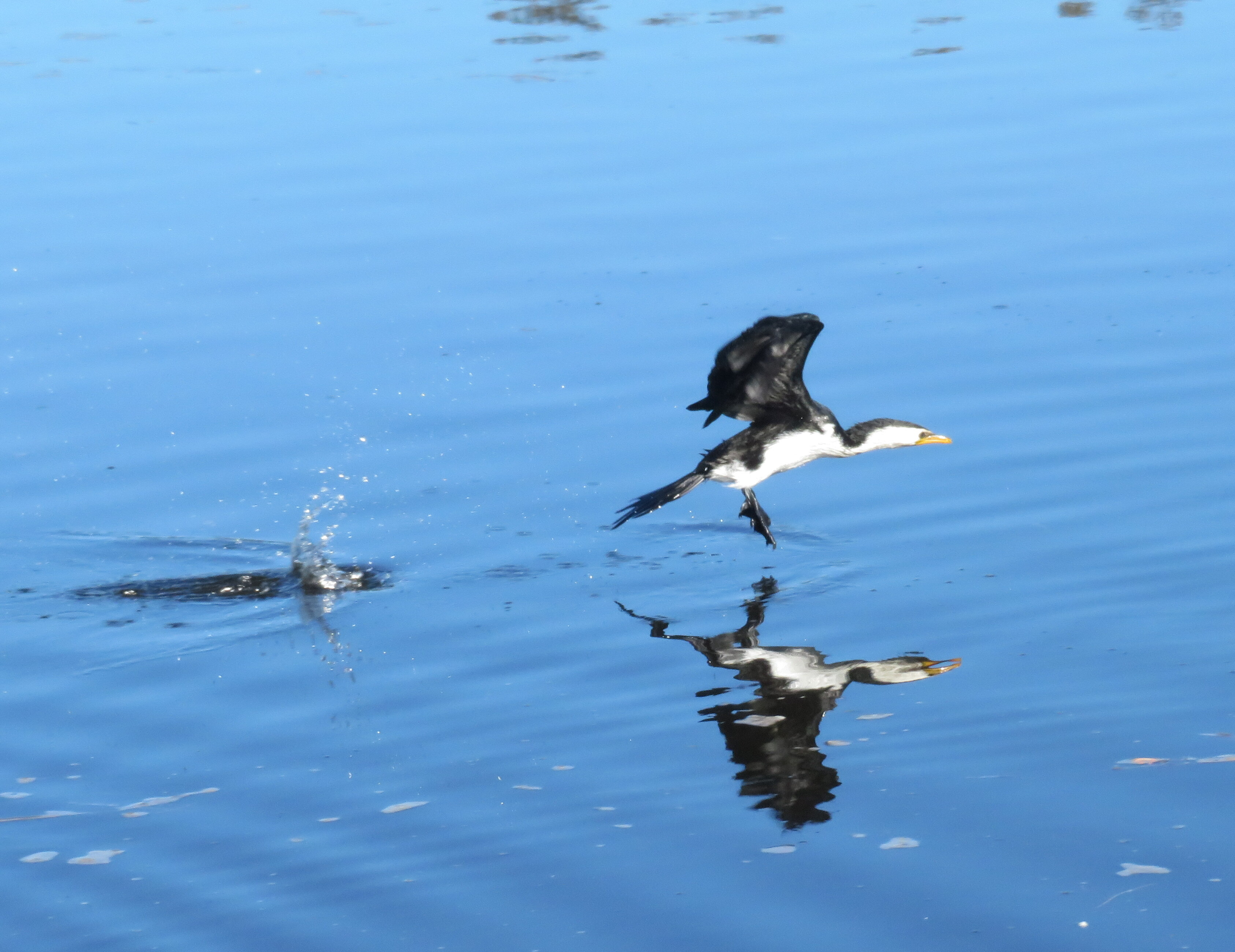
During take-off
