= Fogg =

Fogg may refer to:

- Fogg (surname), including a list of people with the name
- Fogg Art Museum, at Harvard University
- Fogg (brand), an Indian perfume brand
- Fogg Dam in Humpty Doo, Northern Territory, Australia
- Hume-Fogg High School, in Nashville, Tennessee, United States
- Liqueur Fogg, a Brazilian liqueur
- USS Fogg (DE-57), a United States Navy destroyer escort

== See also ==
- Fogge (disambiguation)
- Fog (disambiguation)
