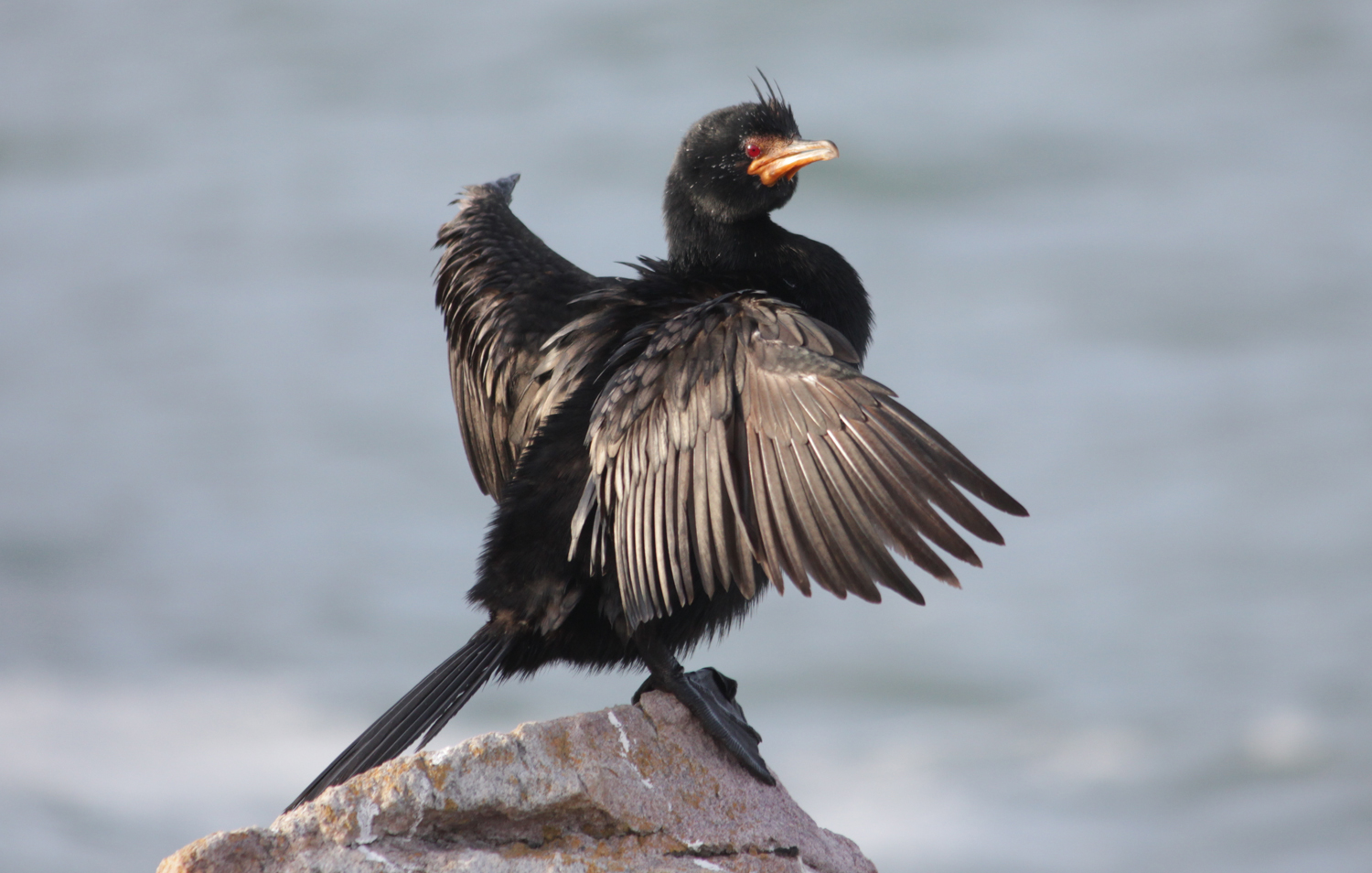

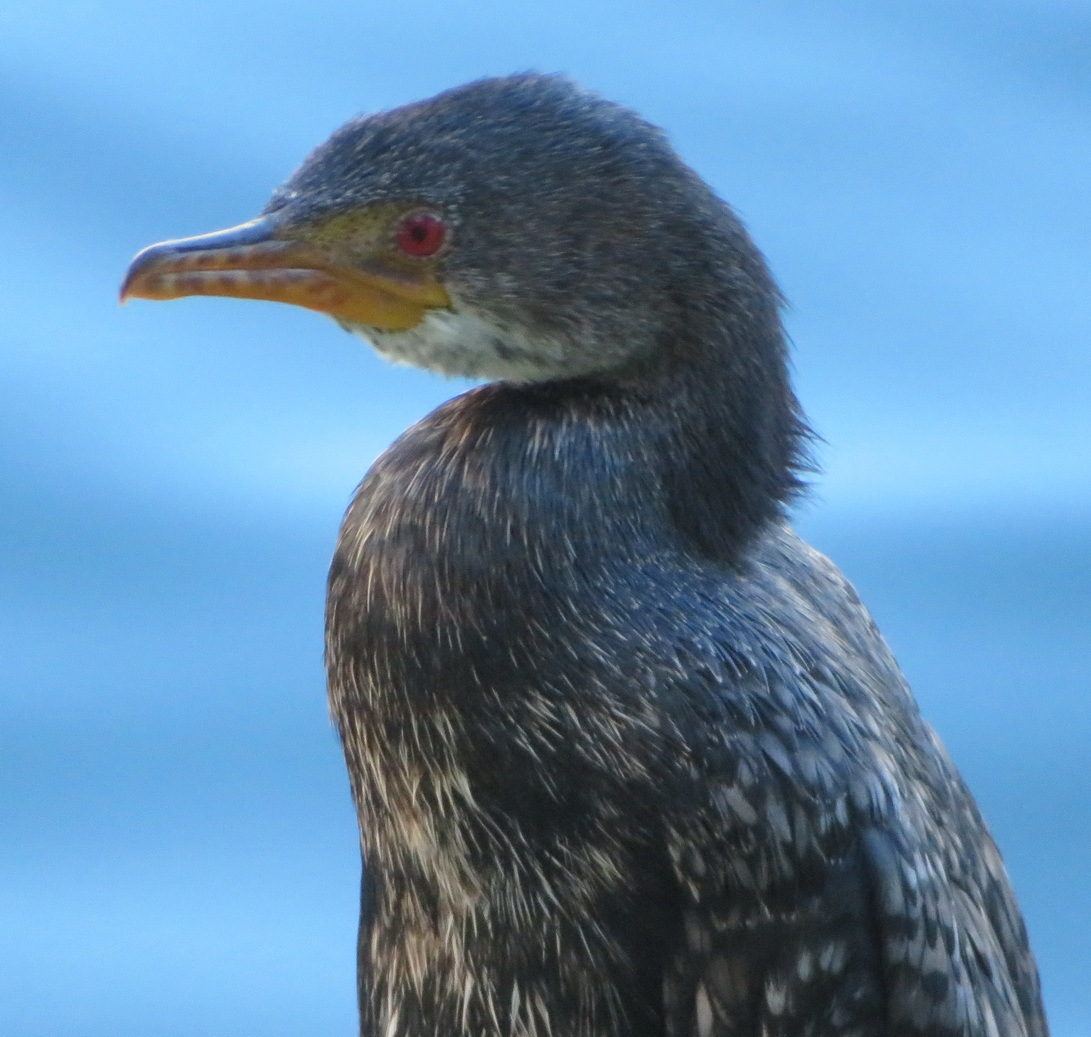
- Juvenile crowned cormorant

Conservation status
- Least Concern (IUCN 3.1)

Scientific classification
- Kingdom: Animalia
- Phylum: Chordata
- Class: Aves
- Order: Suliformes
- Family: Phalacrocoracidae
- Genus: Microcarbo
- Species: M. coronatus

Binomial name
- Microcarbo coronatus (Wahlberg, 1855)
- Extant (resident)

Synonyms
- Graculus coronatus (Wahlberg, 1855); Phalacrocorax coronatus (Wahlberg, 1855)

= Crowned cormorant =

Species of birds

The crowned cormorant (Microcarbo coronatus) or kuifkopduiker, 'Fringe-head diver', is a small cormorant that is endemic to the waters of the cold Benguela Current of southern Africa. It is an exclusively coastal species and is not found more than 10 km (6 mi) away from land. This species is related to the reed cormorant, and was formerly considered to the same species.

== Distribution ==
It is found from Cape Agulhas north to Swakopmund along the coast of southern Africa.

The population appears to be between 2500 and 2900 breeding pairs. It breeds in small groups, with fewer than 150 individuals per colony being typical. Ringing recoveries show that juveniles may disperse up to 277 km from their nests, and adults move between breeding sites over 500 km apart.

== Description ==
The crowned cormorant is 50–55 cm in length. Adults are black with a small crest on the head and a red face patch. Young birds are dark brown above, paler brown below, and lack the crest. They can be distinguished from immature reed cormorants by their darker underparts and shorter tail.

== Behaviour ==
Crowned cormorants feed on slow-moving fish and invertebrates, which they forage for in shallow coastal waters and among kelp beds.

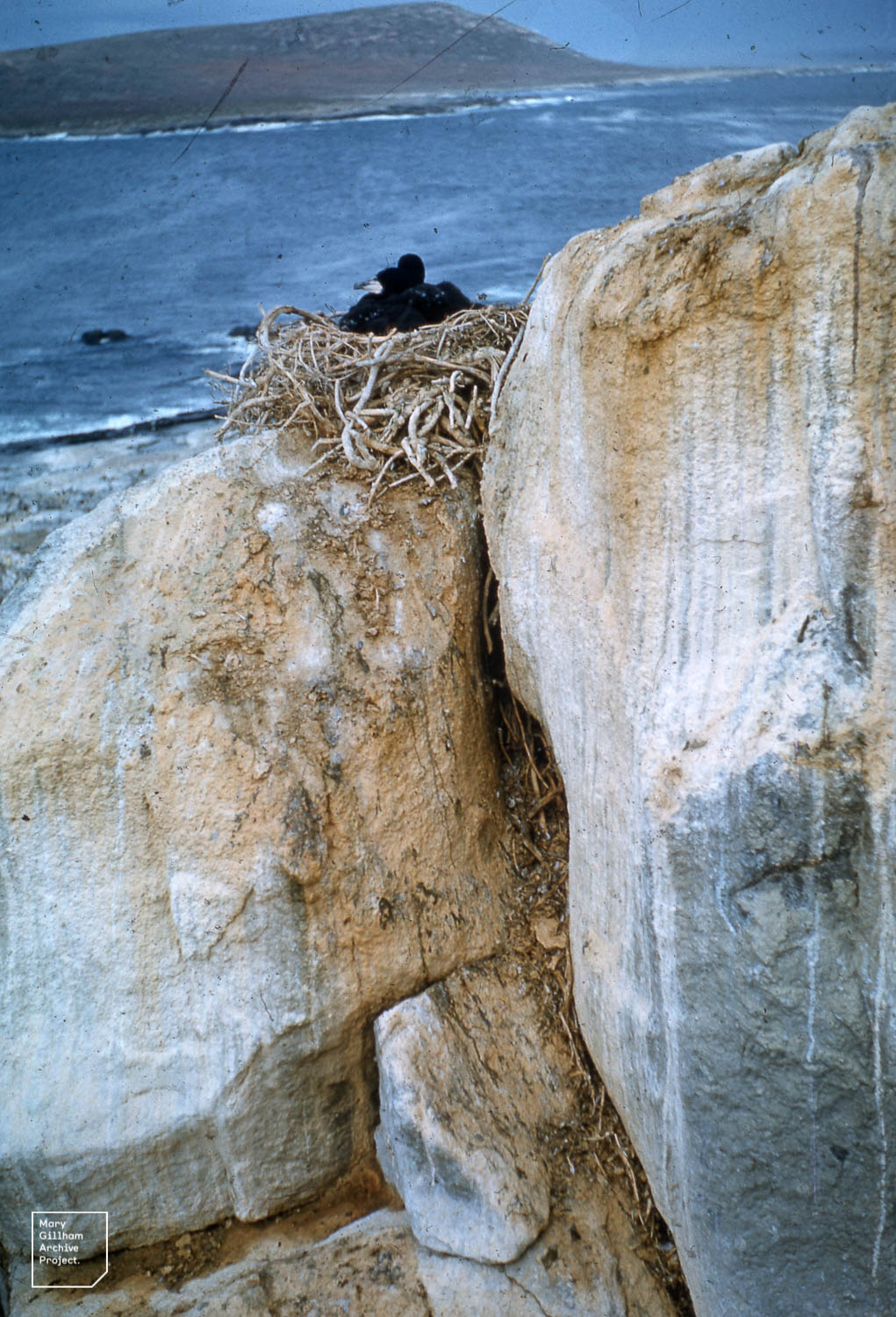
Crowned cormorant in Lycium nest, Robben Island

It builds a nest from kelp, sticks, bones and lines it with kelp or feathers. The nest is usually in an elevated position such as a rocks, trees or man-made structures, but may be built on the ground.

== Conservation ==
Threats to the species include predation of eggs and chicks by kelp gulls and great white pelicans, human disturbance, oiling, and commercial fishing activities, including entanglement in marine debris and plastic fishing gear.

According to the Sasol Birds of Southern Africa and The Eskom Red Data Book of Birds of South Africa, Lesotho and Swaziland, its status is Near Threatened due to its small distribution area, though the IUCN lists it as Least Concern.

== Gallery ==
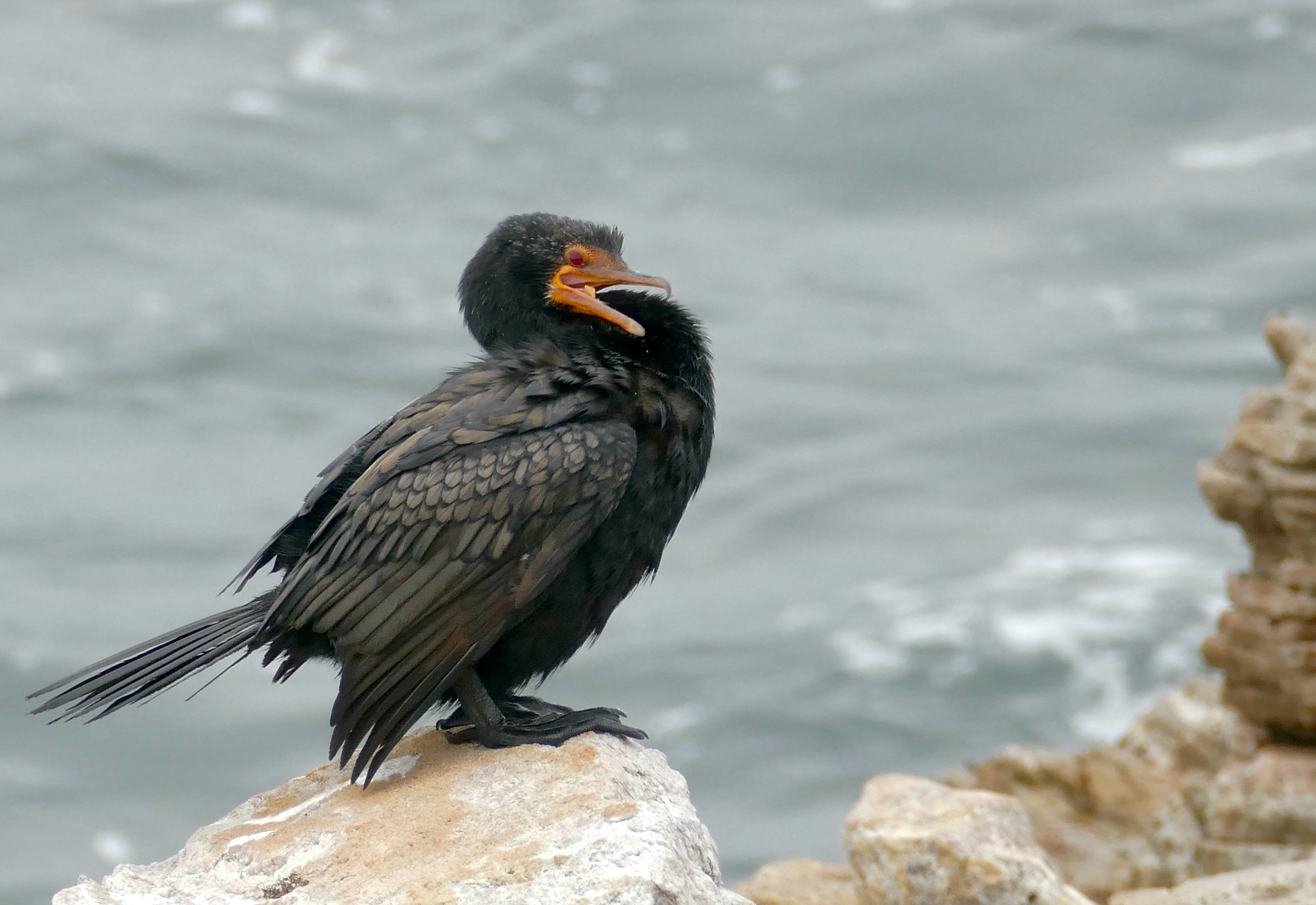

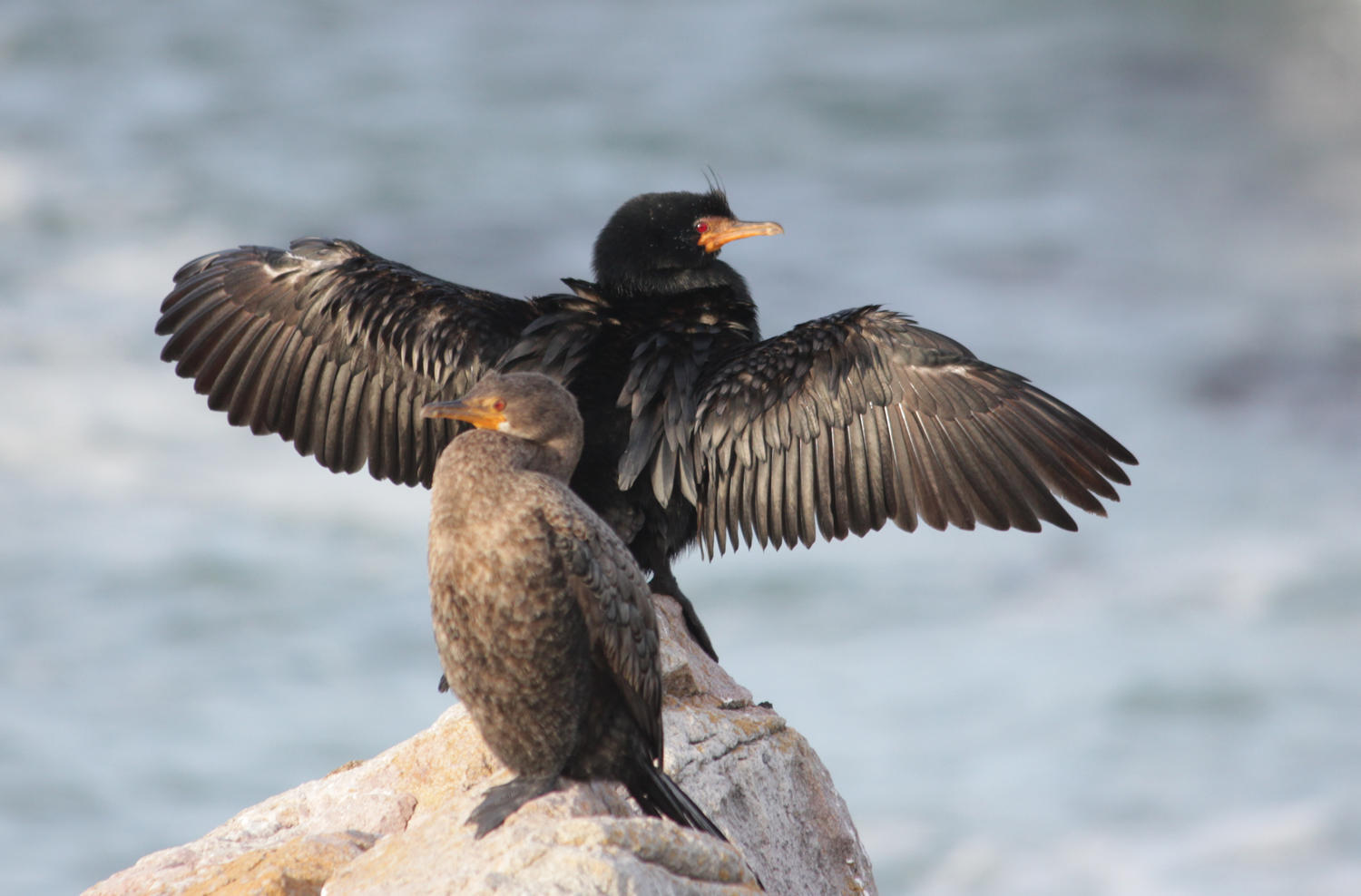
