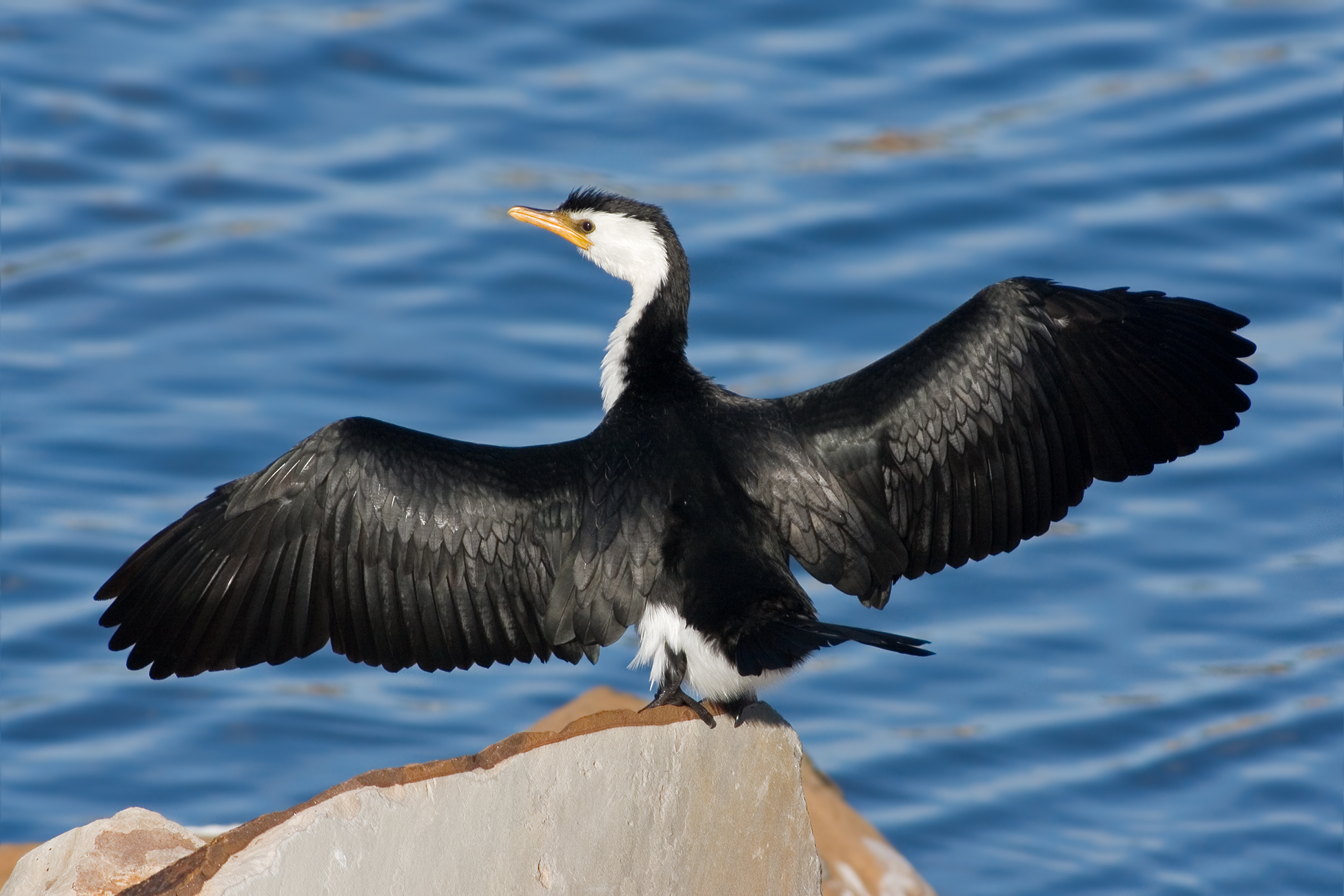
- Little pied cormorant Microcarbo melanoleucos

Scientific classification
- Kingdom: Animalia
- Phylum: Chordata
- Class: Aves
- Order: Suliformes
- Family: Phalacrocoracidae
- Genus: Microcarbo; Bonaparte, 1856

Type species
- Pelecanus pygmaeus (pygmy cormorant) Pallas, 1773

Species
- See text

Synonyms
- Nanocorax (in part)

= Microcarbo =

Genus of birds

Microcarbo is a genus of fish-eating birds, known as cormorants, of the family Phalacrocoracidae. The genus was formerly subsumed within Phalacrocorax.

Microcarbo has been recognized as a valid genus by the IOC's World Bird List on the basis of work by Siegel-Causey (1988), Kennedy et al. (2000), and Christidis and Boles (2008).

As suggested by the name, this genus contains the smallest of the world's cormorants. It is also sister to all other cormorants, having diverged from the rest of the family between 12.8 and 15.4 million years ago.

== Taxonomy ==
The genus Microcarbo was introduced in 1856 by the French naturalist Charles Lucien Bonaparte with the pygmy cormorant as the type species. The name combines the Ancient Greek mikros meaning "small" with the genus name Carbo that was introduced by Bernard Germain de Lacépède in 1789.

The genus contains five species.

== List of species ==
Genus Microcarbo – Bonaparte, 1856 – five species
Common name	Scientific name and subspecies	Range	Size and ecology	IUCN status and estimated population
Crowned cormorant	Microcarbo coronatus (Wahlberg,, 1855)	Cape Agulhas north to Swakopmund along the coast of southern Africa	Size: Habitat: Diet:	LC
Little cormorant	Microcarbo niger (Vieillot, 1817)	Indian Subcontinent east to Java	Size: Habitat: Diet:	LC
Little pied cormorant	Microcarbo melanoleucos (Vieillot, 1817) Three subspecies: M. m. melanoleucos.; M. m. brevicauda Mayr 1931.; M. m. brevirostris Gould 1837	New Zealand, from Stewart Island to Northland, mainland Australia, Tasmania and Indonesia	Size: Habitat: Diet:	LC
Pygmy cormorant	Microcarbo pygmaeus (Pallas, 1773)	south-east of Europe (east of Italy) and south-west of Asia, in Kazakhstan, Tajikistan, Turkmenistan, and Uzbekistan	Size: Habitat: Diet:	LC
Reed cormorant	Microcarbo africanus (Gmelin, JF, 1789) Two subspecies: M. a. africanus (Gmelin, JF, 1789); M. a. pictilis (Bangs, 1918)	Africa south of the Sahara, and Madagascar	Size: Habitat: Diet:	LC

- †Serventys' cormorant, Microcarbo serventyorum
