= Fogging =

Fogging may refer to:

- The accumulation of condensation on a translucent surface
- Distance fog, a technique used in 3D computer graphics
- Fogging (photography), adverse impacts in photography
- Fogging (censorship), a technique for visual censorship
- Anti-fog, substance to prevent fogging of surfaces like glass and plastic
- Fogging (assertiveness), an assertiveness technique
- Electronic cigarette smoking, or fogging
- Fogging (insect control), spraying of pesticides via a fog-like mist for insect control or for collecting them for study
- Fog computing, architecture that uses collaborative end-user clients to carry out storage and communication

== See also ==
- Fog (disambiguation)
