= Phog =

Phog can refer to:

- Kahului Airport (ICAO airport code: PHOG)
- Calligonum polygonoides, a desert shrub
- Phog Allen, American basketball coach
- profoundly hidden outweighing goods defense (PHOG), a solution to the problem of evil

== See also ==
- Fog (disambiguation)
