= Fogge =

Fogge may refer to:

== People ==
- John Fogge (died 1490), English courtier
- Thomas Fogge (died 1407), English politician
- Fogge Newton (17th century), provost of Cambridge; see List of provosts of King's College, Cambridge

== Places ==
- Foggia (Neapolitan: Fogge; Italian: Foggia), Foggia, Apulia, Italy; also known as "Fogge"; a city
- Province of Foggia (Neapolitan: provìnge de Fogge; Italian: Provincia di Foggia), Apulia, Italy; also known as "Fogge"

== Other uses ==
- Fogge, pre-Roman structures in Minervino di Lecce, Lecce, Apulia, Italy

== See also ==
- Fogg (disambiguation)
- Fog (disambiguation)
