= Fog (surname) =

Fog is a surname. Notable people with the surname are as follows:

- Agner Fog, Danish anthropologist and computer scientist
- Dan Fog (1919–2000), Danish music antiquarian
- Dany Fog, French film director
- Magnus Fog (1893–1969), Danish equestrian
- Mogens Fog (1906–1990), Danish resistance fighter and physician
- Peter Schønau Fog (born 1971), Danish film director
