= Dave Fogg =

American DJ and music producer

- Born: Las Vegas, Nevada
- Occupations: DJ and producer
- Years active: 1980s–present

Dave Fogg is an American DJ and record producer born in Las Vegas, Nevada. He was a program director and now resident DJ at XS Nightclub in Las Vegas. XS Nightclub was voted Number 1 in the Nightclub & Bar Top 100. Located in Encore Las Vegas, other DJs and producers have held residences at Encore's nightclubs, like David Guetta and Avicii. He has shared stage with artists like Diplo, Oakenfold, Pete Tong, Afrojack, Rusko, Z-Trip and many more.

== Biography ==
He has always worked in Las Vegas, except for short periods in San Diego and Los Angeles, working for Warner Bros. Records, Polygram Records, and rapper RBX. Dave has been a producer and composer for artists like RBX on his album The RBX Files, and was part of two DJs collectives; Teflon Dons and Inhumanz. With the latter he released a series of LP called “Satanic Mash-ups”, mixing rap with metal music. One of their tracks, Shoot the war pigs, mixing Black Sabbath and NAS was chosen nº2 on Rolling Stone’s Hot List and as a featured download in Spin Magazine

He started mixing music in college, shortly after he began to play at house parties and sport bars in the late 1980s. In 2002, he started at Whiskey Sky, Green Valley Ranch as program director and resident DJ. He would go on to have DJ residencies at the Hard Rock Hotel, Ra Nightclub, Tryst Nightclub and N9NE Group as program director in 2010. In 2011 he returned to XS. In 2003, he appeared in CSI Las Vegas’ episode "Lady Heather's Box" as Lord Create DJ He has also been in production groups like Inhumanz and Teflon Dons, whose EP Rudiments was featured in Billboard Magazine described as “too smooth and engaging”.

== Discography ==
- 1995 The RBX Files (composer).

Teflon Dons

- EP
  - 1996 Rudiments
  - 1998 WMC ’98 Music Sampler
  - 1998 Psycho Ray
  - 1999 Tomorrow People
  - 2000 L-O-V-E
  - 2003 The Rendezvous
  - 2012 Worldship Music EP

Inhumanz

- EP
  - Satanik Mashups Vol. I – V
  - (2003) 50 Inch Nails
  - Satanik Mashups Vol. 666
- LP
  - Inhumanz vs Dilated
  - (2003) Hell to Pay
