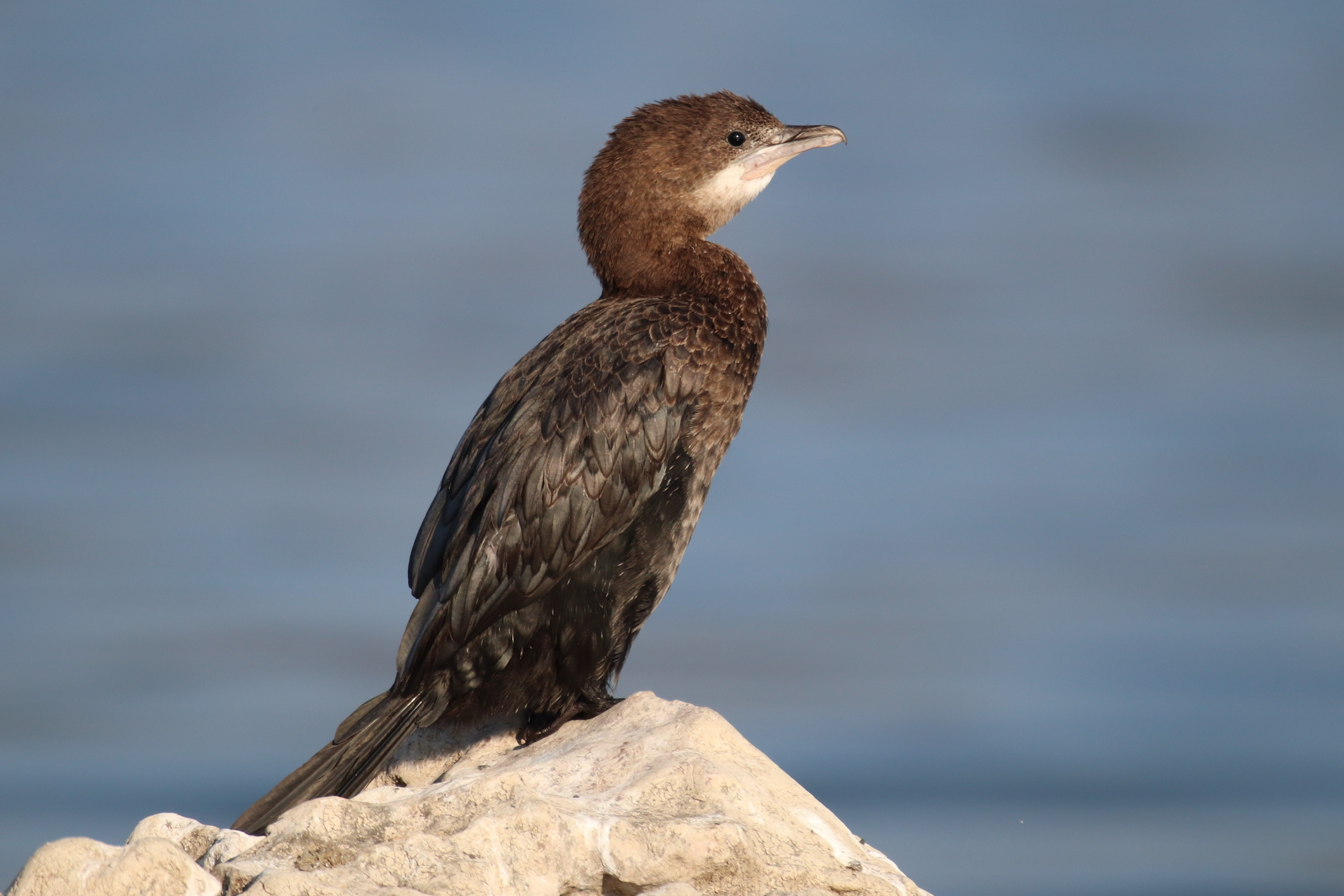
- In non-breeding plumage at Lake Skadar, Montenegro

Conservation status
- Least Concern (IUCN 3.1)

Scientific classification
- Kingdom: Animalia
- Phylum: Chordata
- Class: Aves
- Order: Suliformes
- Family: Phalacrocoracidae
- Genus: Microcarbo
- Species: M. pygmaeus

Binomial name
- Microcarbo pygmaeus (Pallas, 1773)
- Range of M. pygmaeus Breeding Resident Passage Non-breeding Vagrant (seasonality uncertain)

Synonyms
- Phalacrocorax pygmeus

= Pygmy cormorant =

Species of bird

The pygmy cormorant (Microcarbo pygmaeus) is a member of the Phalacrocoracidae (cormorant) family of seabirds. It breeds in south-eastern Europe and south-western Asia. It is partially migratory, with northern populations wintering further south, mostly within its breeding range. It is a rare vagrant to western Europe.

== Distribution ==
The pygmy cormorant occupies an area from the south-east of Europe (east of Italy) and the south-west of temperate Asia, east to Kazakhstan, Tajikistan, Turkmenistan, and Uzbekistan. The largest distribution is in south-east Europe, Albania, Greece, Bulgaria, Romania, the Balkan countries, Turkey, Cyprus, Iran, Iraq (namely the Tigris–Euphrates river system), Azerbaijan, Israel, Syria.

In Romania, according to studies of Czech ornithologist Robert Ritter von Dombrowski, at the end of the 19th century, the pygmy cormorant was present in large colonies in the Danube Delta, Brăila and Ialomița Pond, on Vederoasa Lake (Constanța County), on certain pools and ponds with reeds and willows in Muntenia. The number of pygmy cormorant pairs was 10,000 without taking in account the breeding population of the Danube Delta. Populations of pygmy cormorant in Romania have dramatically declined, especially in 1960 when, due to the communist agricultural policies, the Great Brăila Island and important parts of Ialomiţa Pond were drained in order to practice agriculture, so the habitats of a great number of aquatic birds were destroyed. The pygmy cormorant can be found in the Danube Delta, Jijia Largă Pond (Iași County), probably on Mața, Rădeanu, Vădeni Ponds (in Galați County), Cârja Pond (Vaslui County), at Vlădești on Prut River (Galați County), on Calinovăț Island from Caraș-Severin County, on Small Brăila Island, on Dunăreni Pond (Mârleanu, Constanța County), in Danubian Plain on Parches Pond-Somova (Tulcea County).

At global scale, it was estimated that the entire population of pygmy cormorants is 85,000-180,000 individuals (a study effectuated by Wetlands International in 2006) and 74-94% of total population lives in Europe. The biggest colony is in the Danube Delta, numbering 4,000 pairs, but this seems certain to plunge due to a massive canalization scheme, which despite the protected status of the delta, commenced in May 2004. According to a study made by BirdLife International in 2004, it was estimated that population of pygmy cormorant in Romania was 11,500-14,000 pairs and during the winter 1,500-4,000 pairs.

== Habitat and ecology ==
Pygmy cormorants like pools with plenty of vegetation, lakes and river deltas. They avoid mountainous and cold and dry areas. They love rice fields or other flooded areas where trees and shrubs can be found. During winter they also go to waters with higher salinity, in estuaries or on barrier lakes. These are birds who can live alone or in groups and they have adapted to human presence. They build nests from sticks and reeds in dense vegetation, in trees, shrubs, willows but occasionally in reeds on small floating islets. At the end of May, beginning of June, both parents incubate for 27–30 days, and nestlings become independent after 70 days. The young are fed by their parents with small fish and other aquatic animals. This bird frequently shares the same type of habitat with egrets, herons and spoonbills.

== Threats ==
The pygmy cormorant is a species with habitats strongly affected by human actions. Threats include the drainage and serious degradation of wetlands and their associated woodland, water pollution, disturbance, and poaching as well as drowning in fishing nets.

Being a great fish consumer and destroyer of fishing nets, it is often persecuted by fishermen. In Romania, pond drainage located on the inferior course of the Danube for agricultural purposes, the accidental death of birds captive in improvised fishing nets, nest destruction by professional fishermen in order to protect fish resources decreased of the number of individuals which put the species on the International Union for Conservation of Nature (IUCN) Red List as a vulnerable species. It is also hunted in leisure activities, and in Iran the pygmy cormorant is commercialized for cooking.

This species is distinguished from the great cormorant and the common shag by its much smaller size (length 64-78cm), lighter build, and long tail.

It feeds mainly on fish, often hunting in groups, and perches in trees between fishing expeditions.

The pygmy cormorant is one of the species to which the Agreement on the Conservation of African-Eurasian Migratory Waterbirds (AEWA) applies.

== Gallery ==
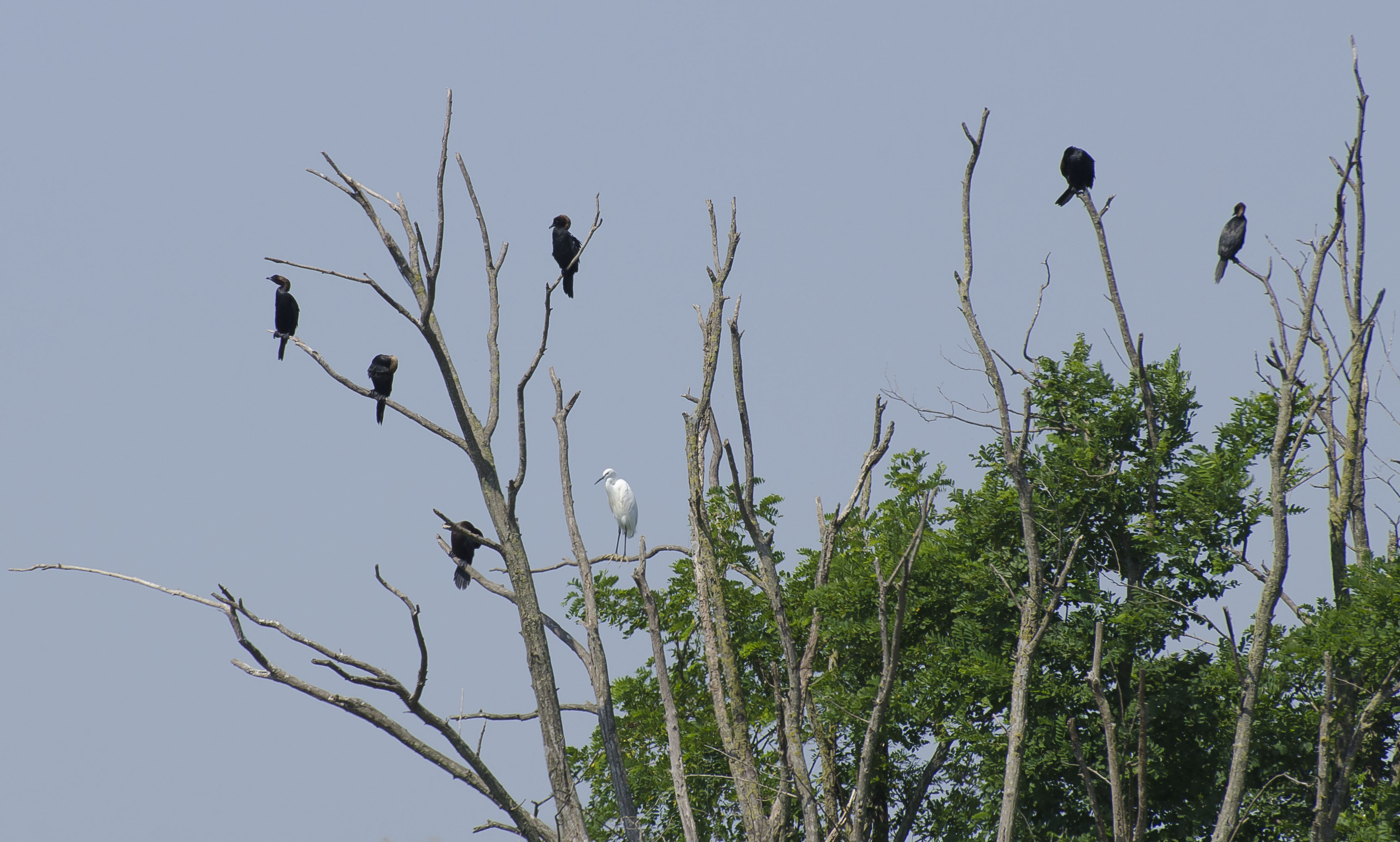
Pygmy cormorants and little egret (Egretta garzetta) in the Venetian Lagoon

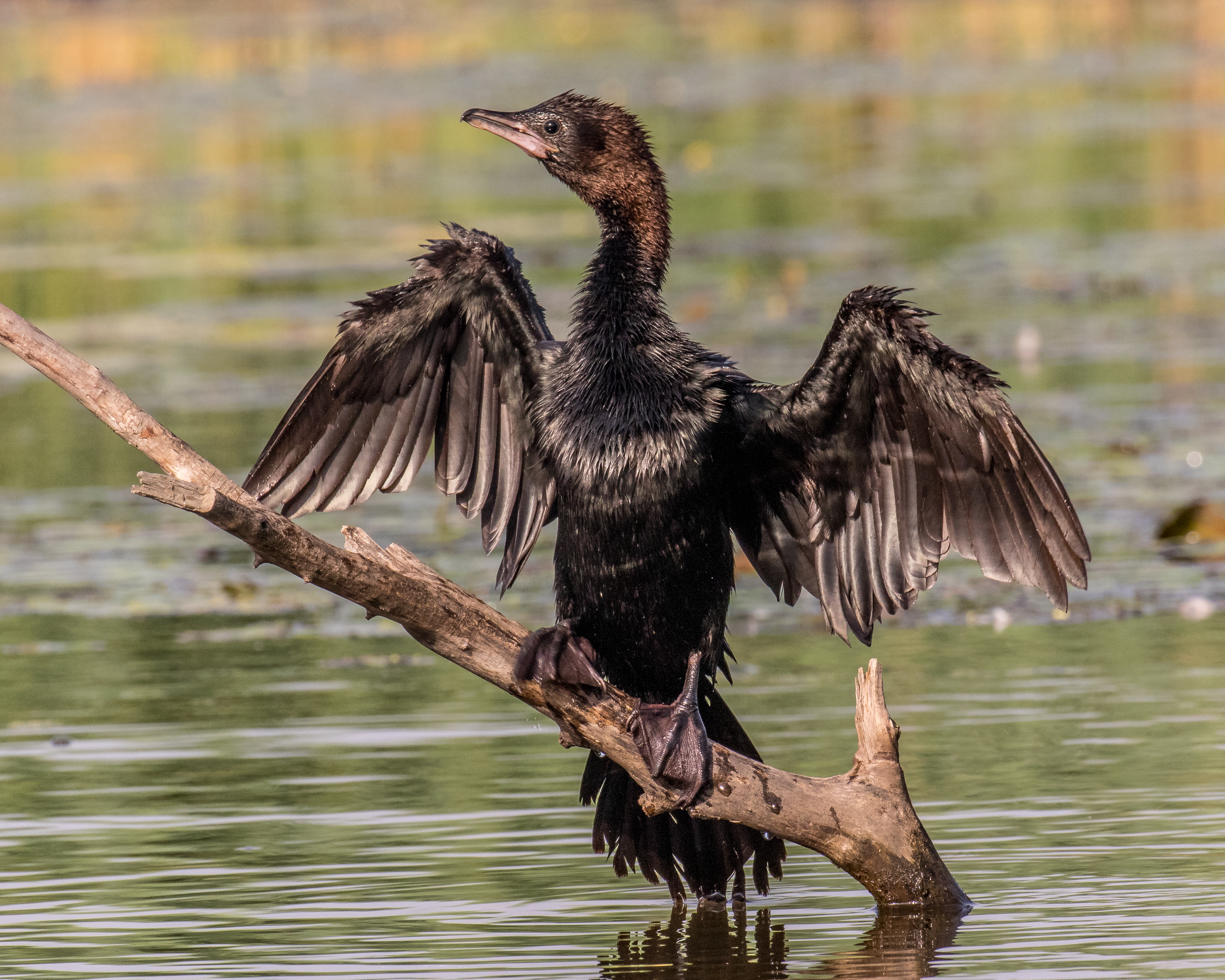
In breeding plumage in Hungary

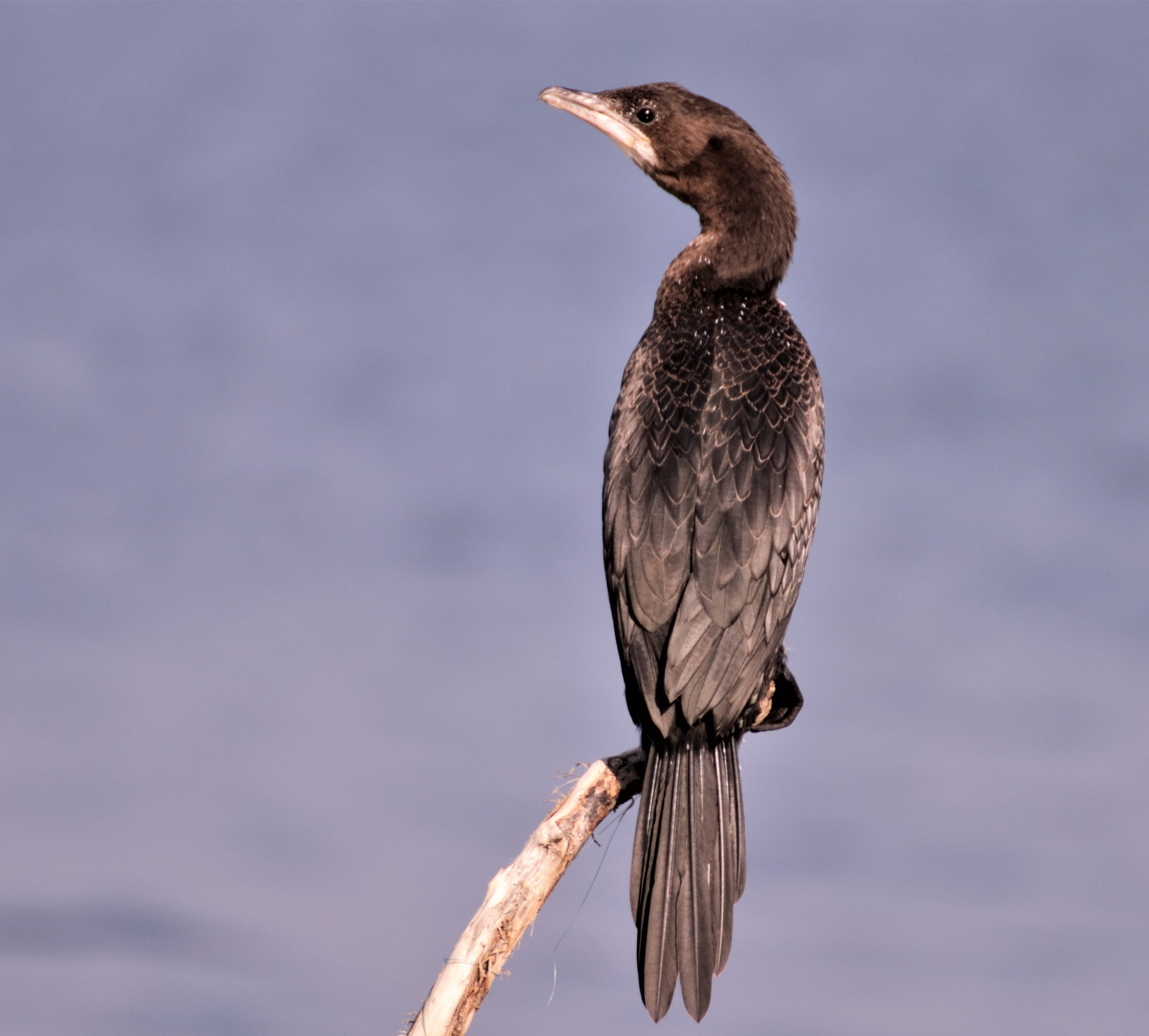
Pygmy cormorant in the Sea of Galilee

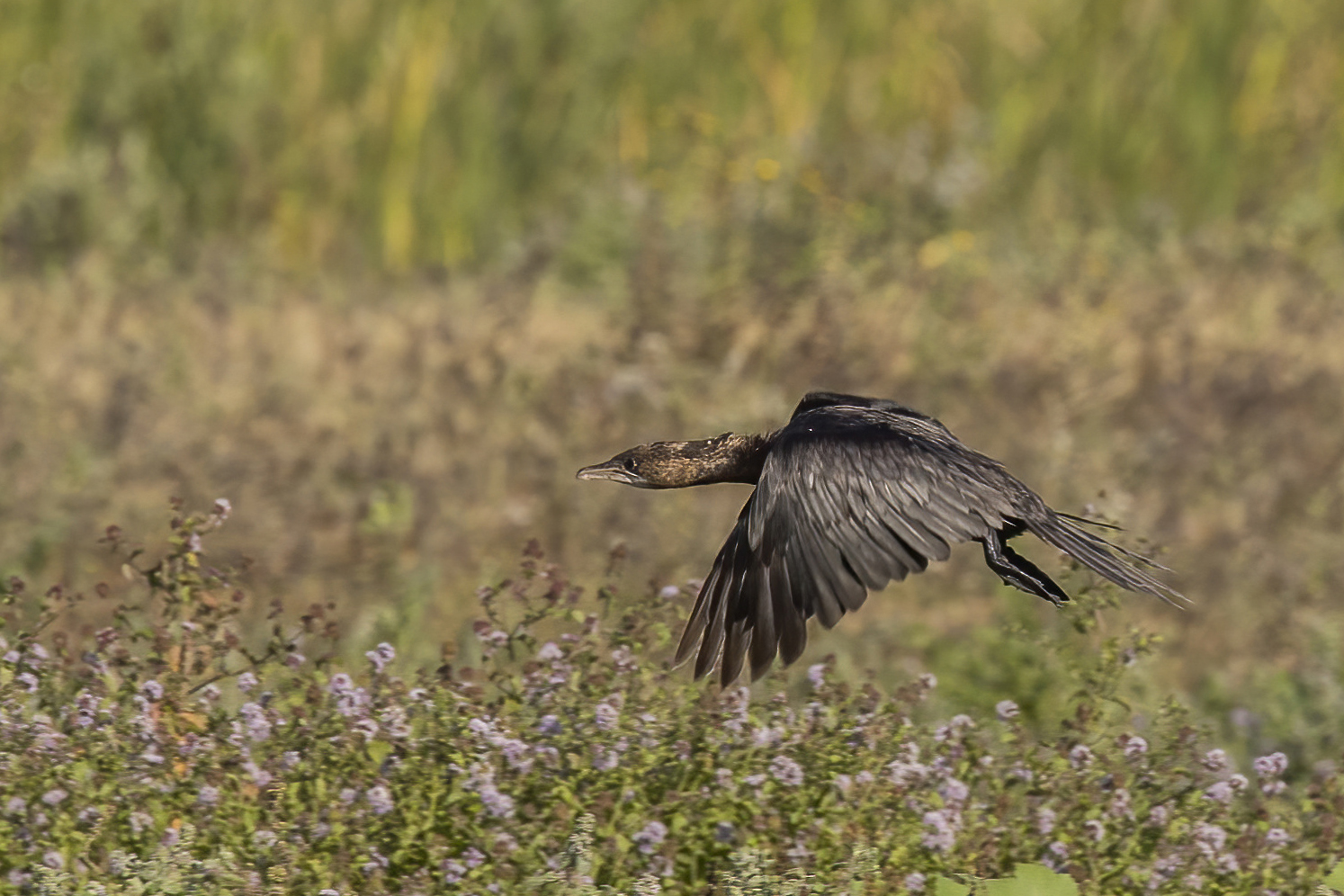
In the Danube Delta, Romania

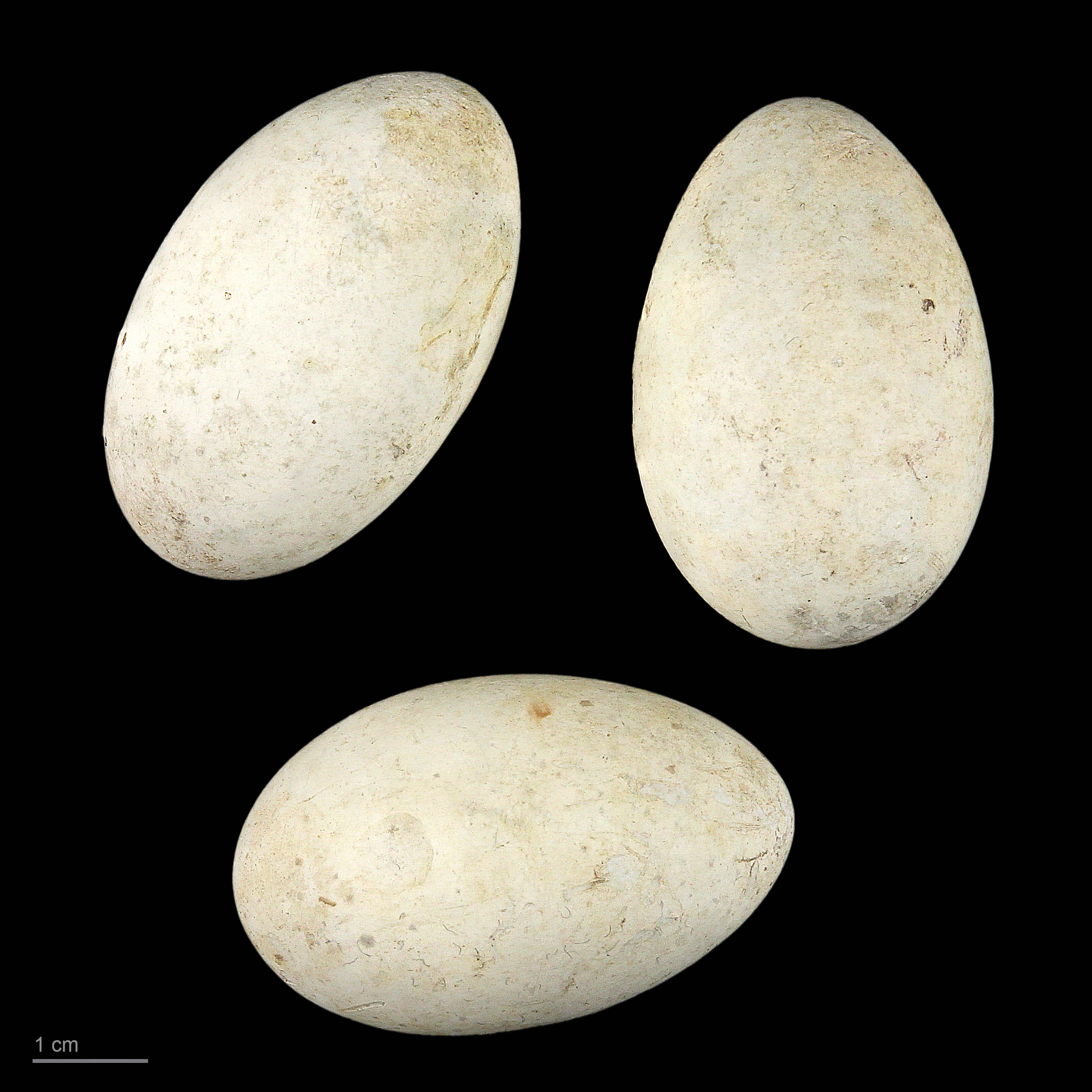
Egg, Muséum de Toulouse

== Bibliography ==
- Nelson, J. Brian (2006). Pelicans, Cormorants, and Their Relatives: The Pelecaniformes. Bird Families of the World. Oxford University Press. ISBN 978-0-19-857727-0.
- Hume, Rob (2011). RSPB Birds of Britain and Europe (3rd (+CD) ed.). Dorling Kindersley. ISBN 978-1-4053-6202-3.
