= London fog =

London fog may refer to:

- London fog (beverage), a hot tea-based drink
- London Fog (company), an American manufacturer of coats and other apparel
- London Fog (nightclub), a 1960s nightclub located on the Sunset Strip
- London Fog 1966, a live album by the American rock band the Doors
- Pea soup fog (also London fog), a very thick and often yellowish, greenish or blackish fog caused by air pollution
