= Fog Bay and Finniss River Floodplains =

Floodplain in the Northern Territory of Australia

Coordinates: 12°57′11″S 130°24′54″E

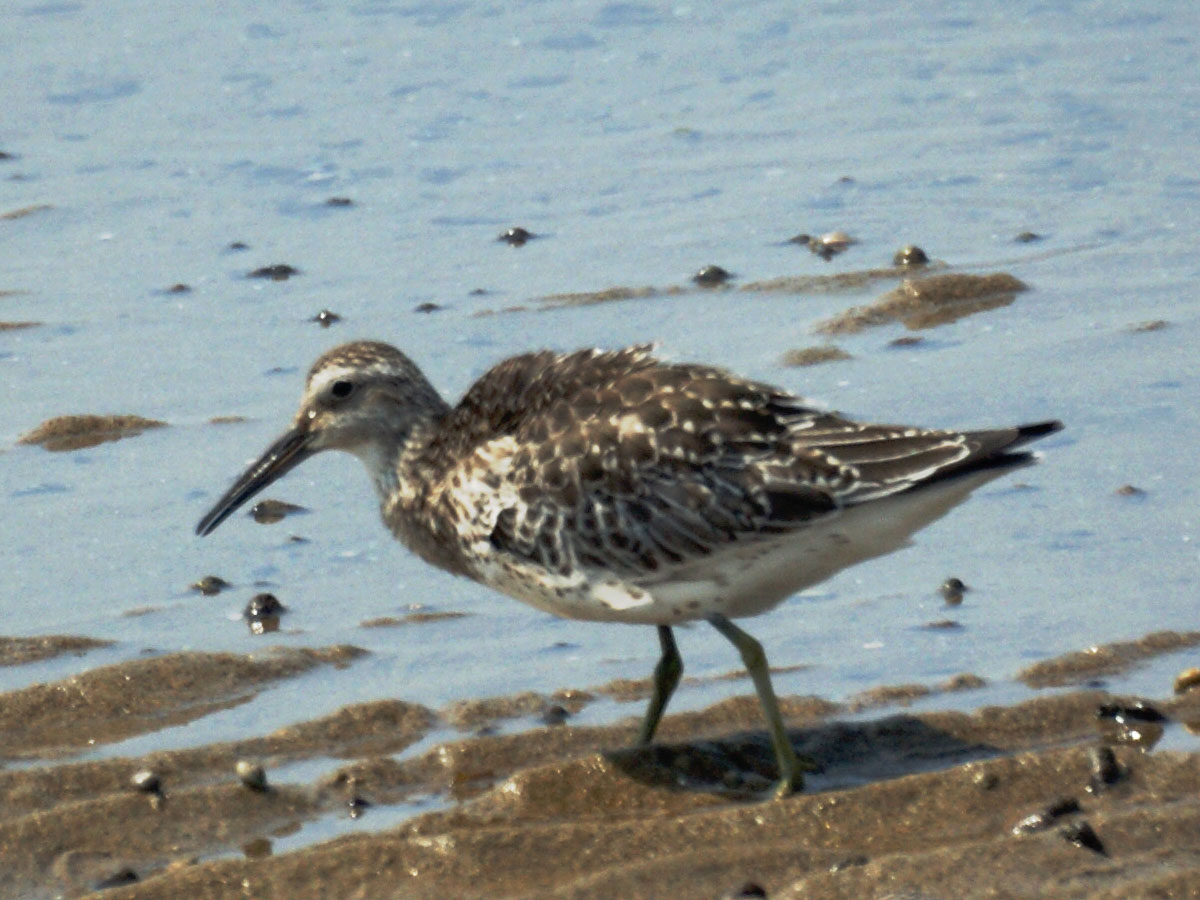
The site is important for great knots

The Fog Bay and Finniss River Floodplains comprise the floodplain of the lower reaches of the Finniss River with the adjoining intertidal mudflats of Fog Bay in the Top End of the Northern Territory of Australia. It is an important site for waterbirds.

== Description ==
The 789 square kilometres (305 sq mi) site lies on the north-western coast of the Northern Territory, some 65 kilometres (40 mi) south-west of Darwin. The floodplain is mainly seasonally inundated paperbark and sedge swamps. The bay is dominated by sand, salt and mudflats with a shoreline of mangroves and mangrove-lined channels, grassed dunes and patches of samphire.

== Fog Bay ==
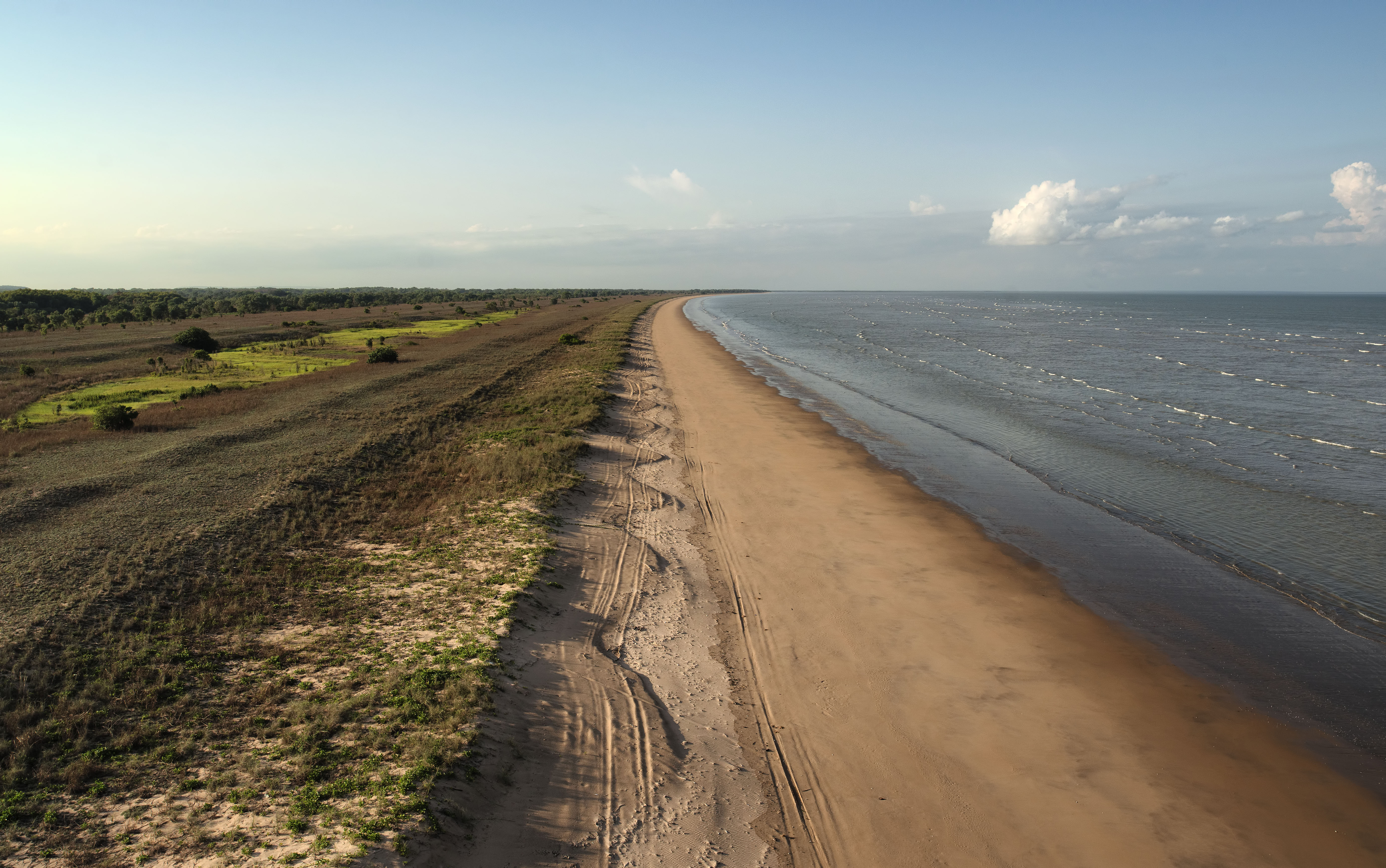
5 Mile Beach is just north of the Finniss River mouth

Fog Bay is a bay of the Australian coast, located approximately 65 kilometres (40 mi) south-west of Darwin, Northern Territory.

The shallow bay is approximately 25 kilometres (16 mi) wide and extends from Native Point at its north-east end to Point Jenny to the south-west. The town of Dundee Beach is at the north-east end of the bay. The coastline includes the mouth of the Finniss River, which enters around the middle of the bay. The coast north of the mouth is mostly sandy flats, whereas south of the Finnis the coastline is made up of intertidal mud flats backed by mangroves.

The Fog Bay and Finniss River Floodplains have been identified as an Important Bird Area.

== Birds ==
The site has been identified as an Important Bird Area (IBA) by BirdLife International. The floodplain supports over 1% of the world populations magpie geese and pied herons. The mudflats of Fog Bay, extending from Point Jenny to Stingray Head, support over 1% of the world populations of great knots and grey-tailed tattlers, among the maximum of 35,000 waders, or shorebirds, recorded. Other waders for which the site is at least sometimes important include black-tailed godwits, greaters and lesser sand plovers, grey plovers, Terek sandpipers, and Far Eastern curlews. Other waterbirds that have been recorded in relatively large numbers include little pied and little black cormorants, darters, royal spoonbills, glossy, straw-necked and Australian white ibises, great and intermediate egrets, plumed and wandering whistling ducks, grey teals, Pacific black ducks, and brolgas.
