= Peter Fogg =

Peter Parry Fogg

Personal details
- Born: 1832
- Died: 1920 (aged 87–88)
- Education: University of Tasmania; Jesus College, Oxford

Peter Parry Fogg (1832 – 22 March 1920) was Archdeacon of George in the Cape of Good Hope from 1871 onwards.

== Life ==
Fogg was born at Coppa, Mold in the county of Flintshire in north Wales. He was educated in Germany, Christ College, Tasmania and Jesus College, Oxford. At Oxford, he obtained a third-class degree in Literae Humaniores and was secretary, treasurer and president of the Oxford Union Society. He was the first man from Jesus College to become President of the Union. He was ordained in 1860 and served at churches in Lambeth, Highgate and Streatham. In 1871, he was appointed Archdeacon of George. He was a member of the first council of the University of the Cape of Good Hope (1873). In 1899, he was appointed vicar-general of Saint Helena. He died on 22 March 1920.
