= Karen Fogg =

British diplomat

- Occupation: Diplomat

Karen Fogg is a British diplomat, who has worked for the European Commission, and served as the Head of the European Commission Delegation in Bucharest between 1993 and 1998, and as Head of the European Commission Delegation in Ankara between 1998 and 2002, after joining the Commission in 1973.

In 2002, while working for the Commission in Ankara, her emails were hacked, leaked to the media, and published by Aydınlık, the newspaper of the Patriotic Party. Chairman of the party, Doğu Perinçek, used these emails to claim that Fogg was spying against Turkey, and working against the country. This caused a "full-scale diplomatic row between the EU and Turkey", as described by The Economist. The spokesman of then European Commissioner for Enlargement, Guenter Verheugen, said "But we also demand ... that Turkish authorities see that an end is put to the publication of these e-mails, which, as you know, were pirated. This correspondence is protected under the Vienna Convention on diplomatic representations".

After this, she became Secretary-General of the International Institute for Democracy and Electoral Assistance between 2002 and 2005.
