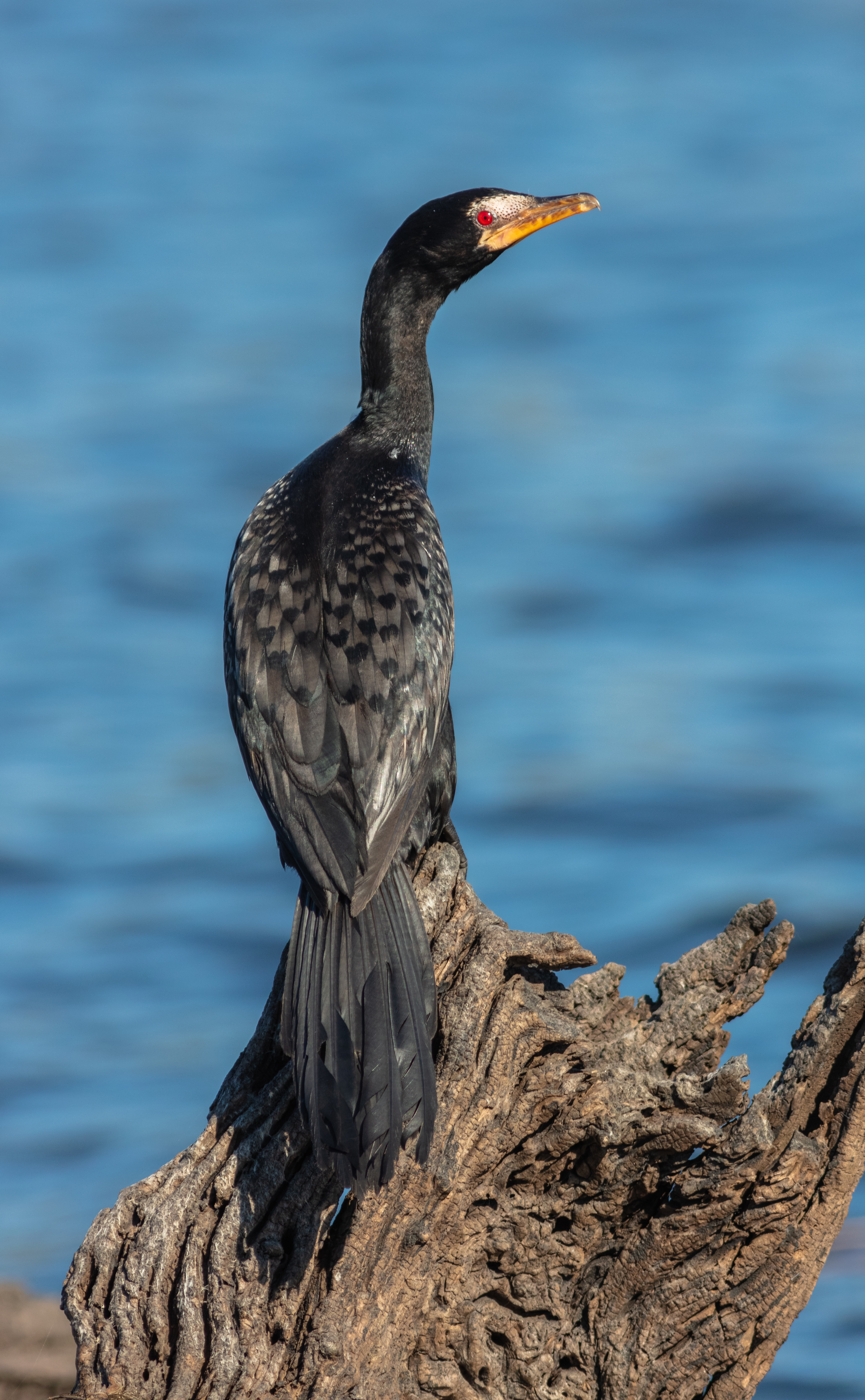
- Chobe National Park, Botswana

Conservation status
- Least Concern (IUCN 3.1)

Scientific classification
- Kingdom: Animalia
- Phylum: Chordata
- Class: Aves
- Order: Suliformes
- Family: Phalacrocoracidae
- Genus: Microcarbo
- Species: M. africanus

Binomial name
- Microcarbo africanus (Gmelin, JF, 1789)

Synonyms
- Plotus nanus Anhinga nana Microcarbo africanus Phalacrocorax africanus

= Reed cormorant =

Species of bird

The reed cormorant (Microcarbo africanus), also known as the long-tailed cormorant, is a bird in the cormorant family Phalacrocoracidae. It breeds in much of Africa south of the Sahara, and Madagascar. It is resident but undertakes some seasonal movements.

== Taxonomy ==
The reed cormorant was formally described in 1789 by the German naturalist Johann Friedrich Gmelin in his revised and expanded edition of Carl Linnaeus's Systema Naturae. He placed it in the genus Pelecanus and coined the binomial name Pelecanus africanus. Gmelin based his description on the "African shag" that had been described in 1785 by the English ornithologist John Latham in his book A General Synopsis of Birds. The reed cormorant is now one of five small cormorants placed in the genus Microcarbo that was introduced in 1856 by the French naturalist Charles Lucien Bonaparte.

Two subspecies are recognised:

- M. a. africanus (Gmelin, JF, 1789) – inland and coastal Sub-Saharan Africa
- M. a. pictilis (Bangs, 1918) – Madagascar (mainly west)

== Description ==
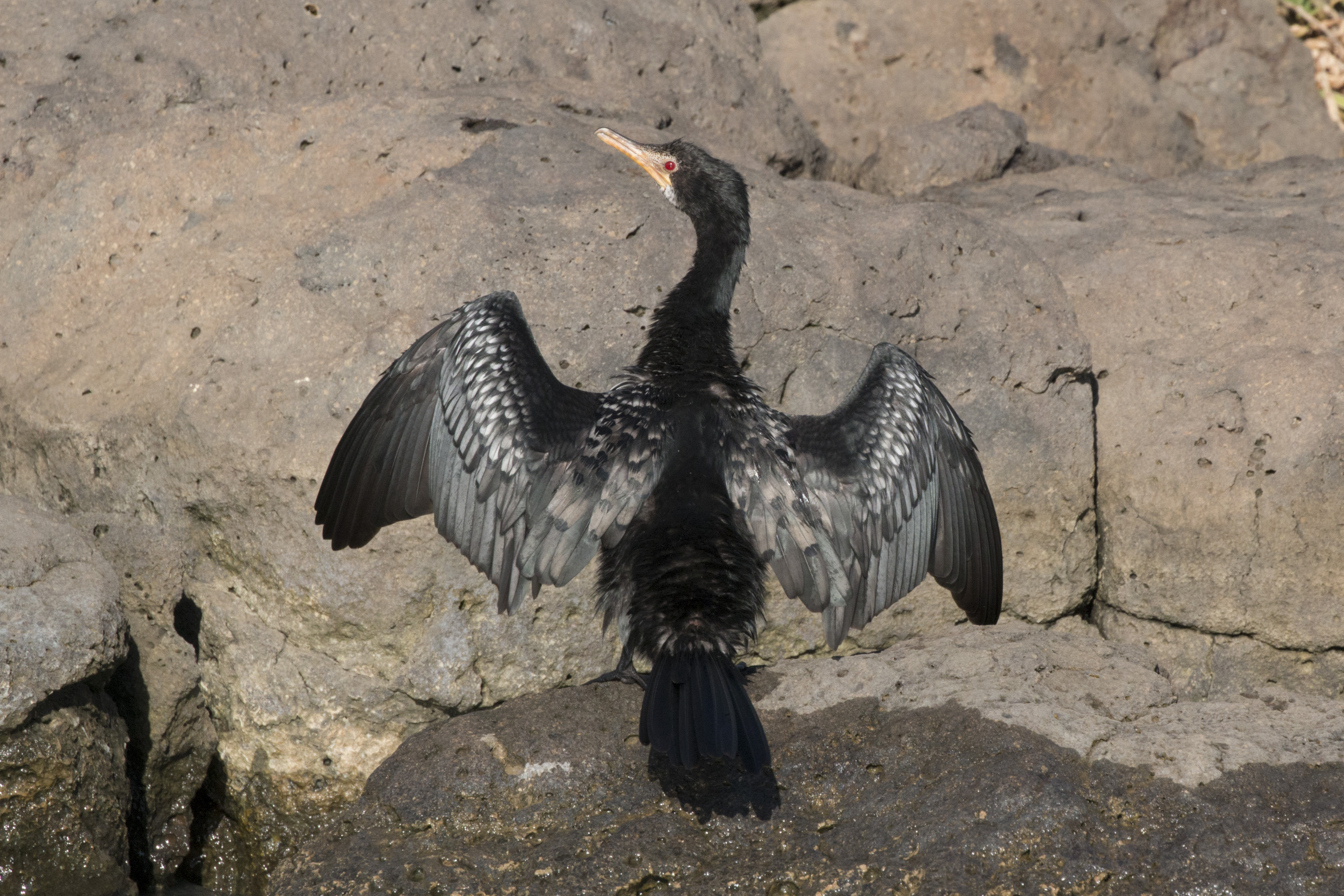
drying wings Lake Baringo, Kenya

This is a small cormorant, 50–55 cm (20–22 in) in overall length with a wingspan of 80–90 cm (31–35 in). It is mainly black, glossed green, in the breeding season. The wing coverts are silvery. It has a longish tail, a short head crest and a red or yellow face patch. The bill is yellow.

The sexes are similar, but non-breeding adults and juveniles are browner, with a white belly. Some southern races retain the crest all year round.

== Distribution and habitat ==
This is a common and widespread species, and is not considered to be threatened. It breeds on freshwater wetlands or quiet coasts.

== Behaviour ==
The reed cormorant can dive to considerable depths, but usually feeds in shallow water. It frequently brings prey to the surface. It takes a wide variety of fish. It prefers small slow-moving fish, and those with long and tapering shapes, such as mormyrids, catfishes, and cichlids. It will less frequently eat soles (which can be important in its diet locally), frogs, aquatic invertebrates, and small birds.

Two to four eggs are laid in a nest in a tree or on the ground, normally hidden from view by long grass.

== Gallery ==
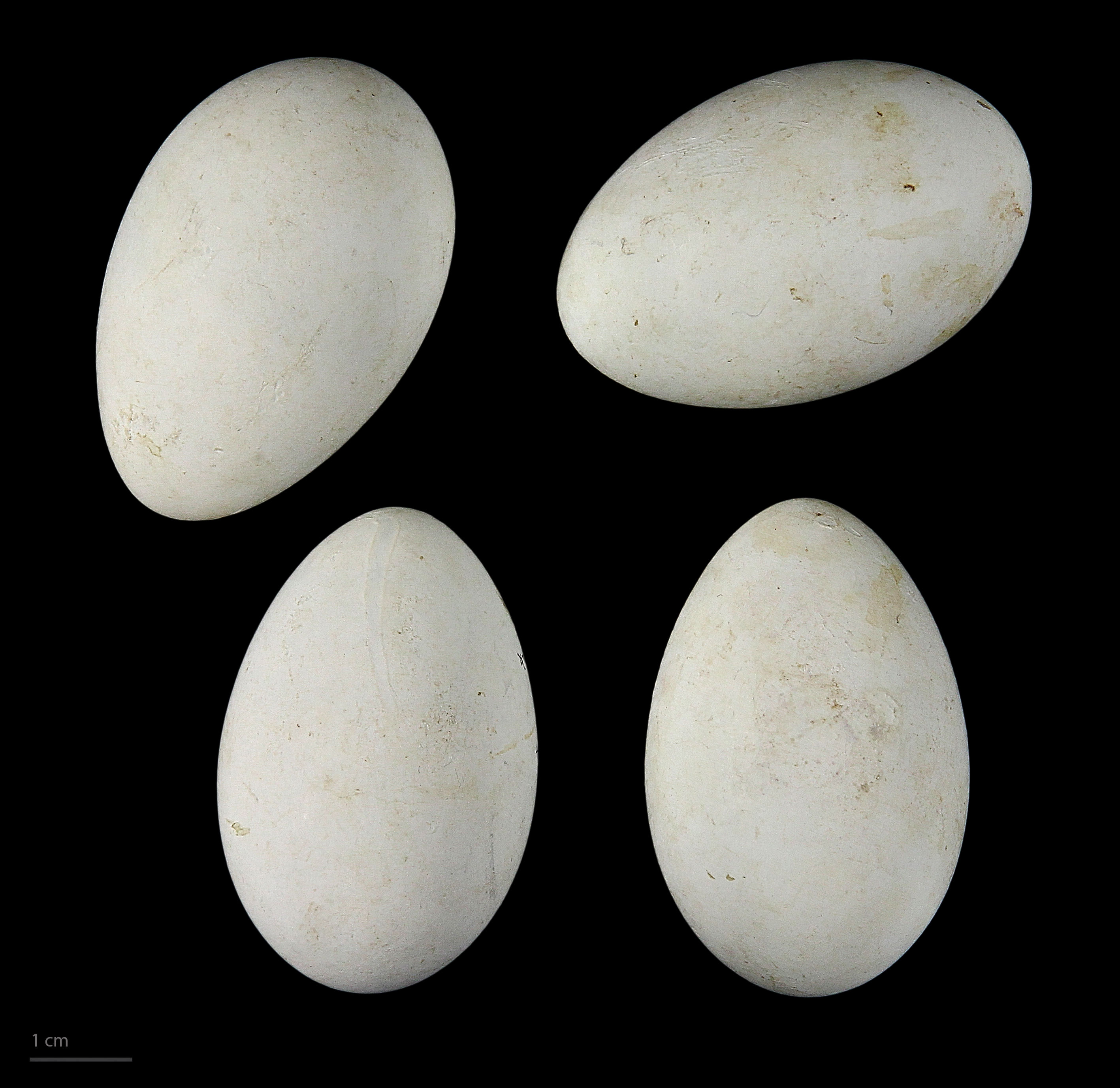
eggs - MHNT

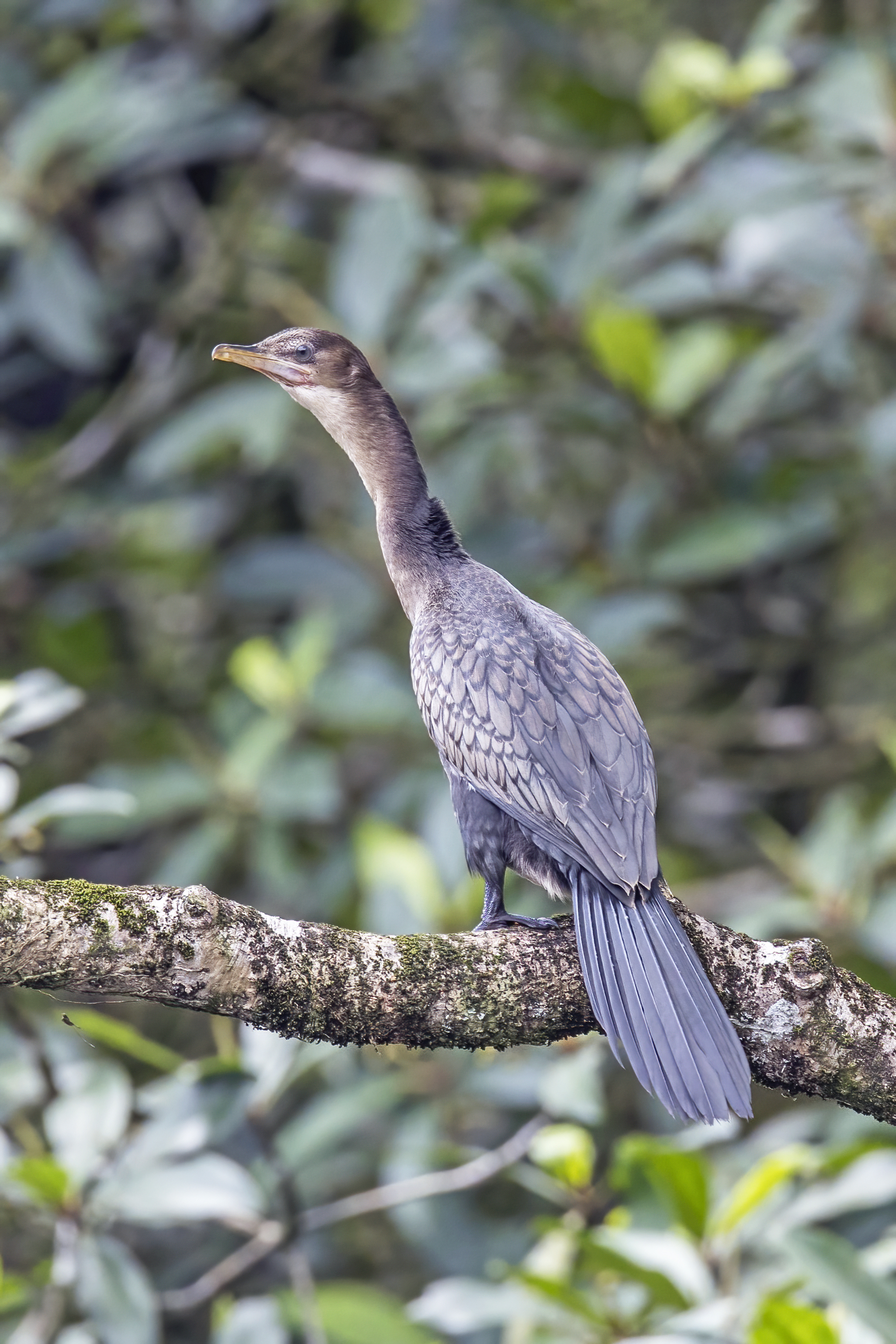
juvenile
São Tomé and Príncipe

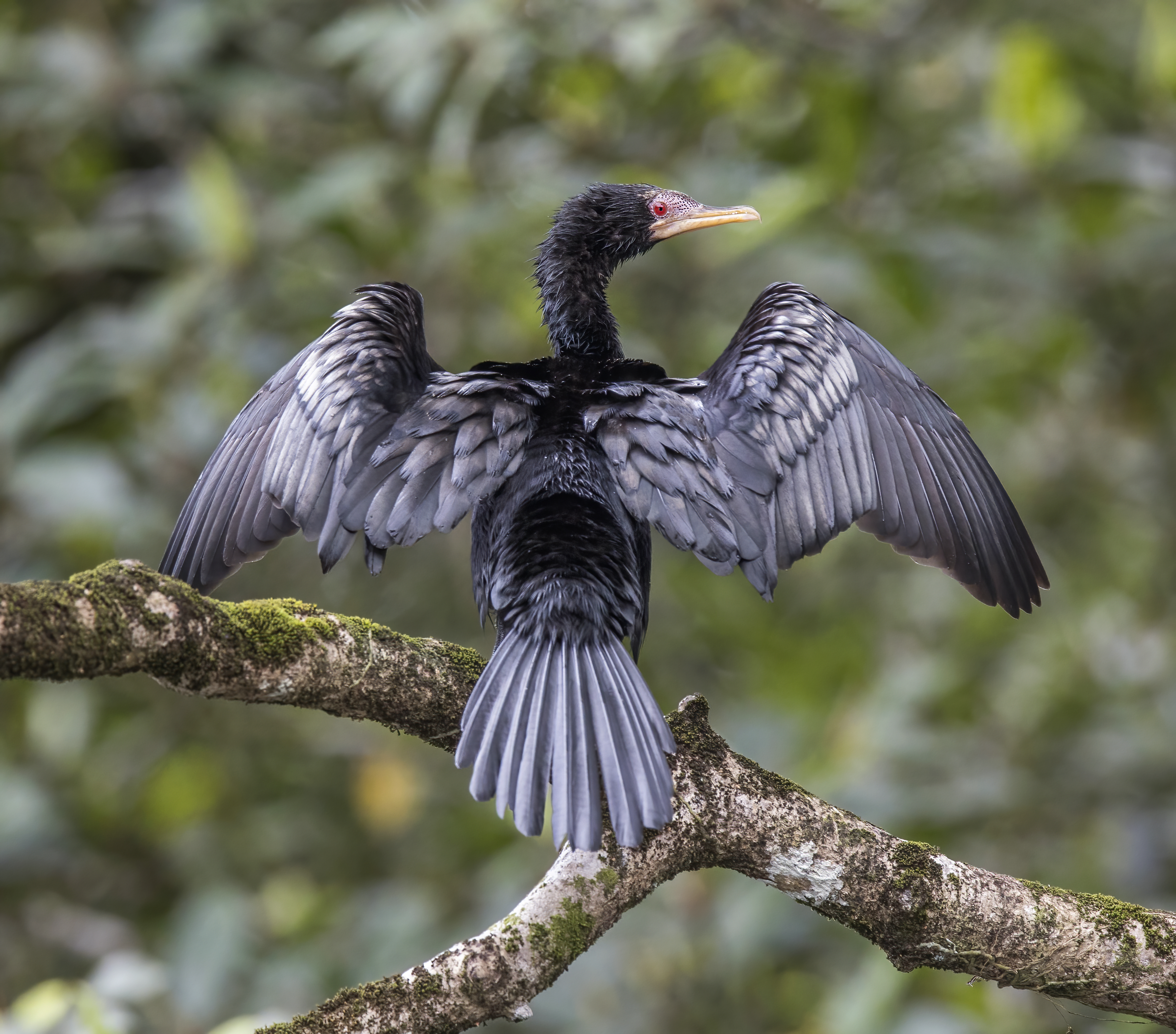
adult drying wings
São Tomé and Príncipe

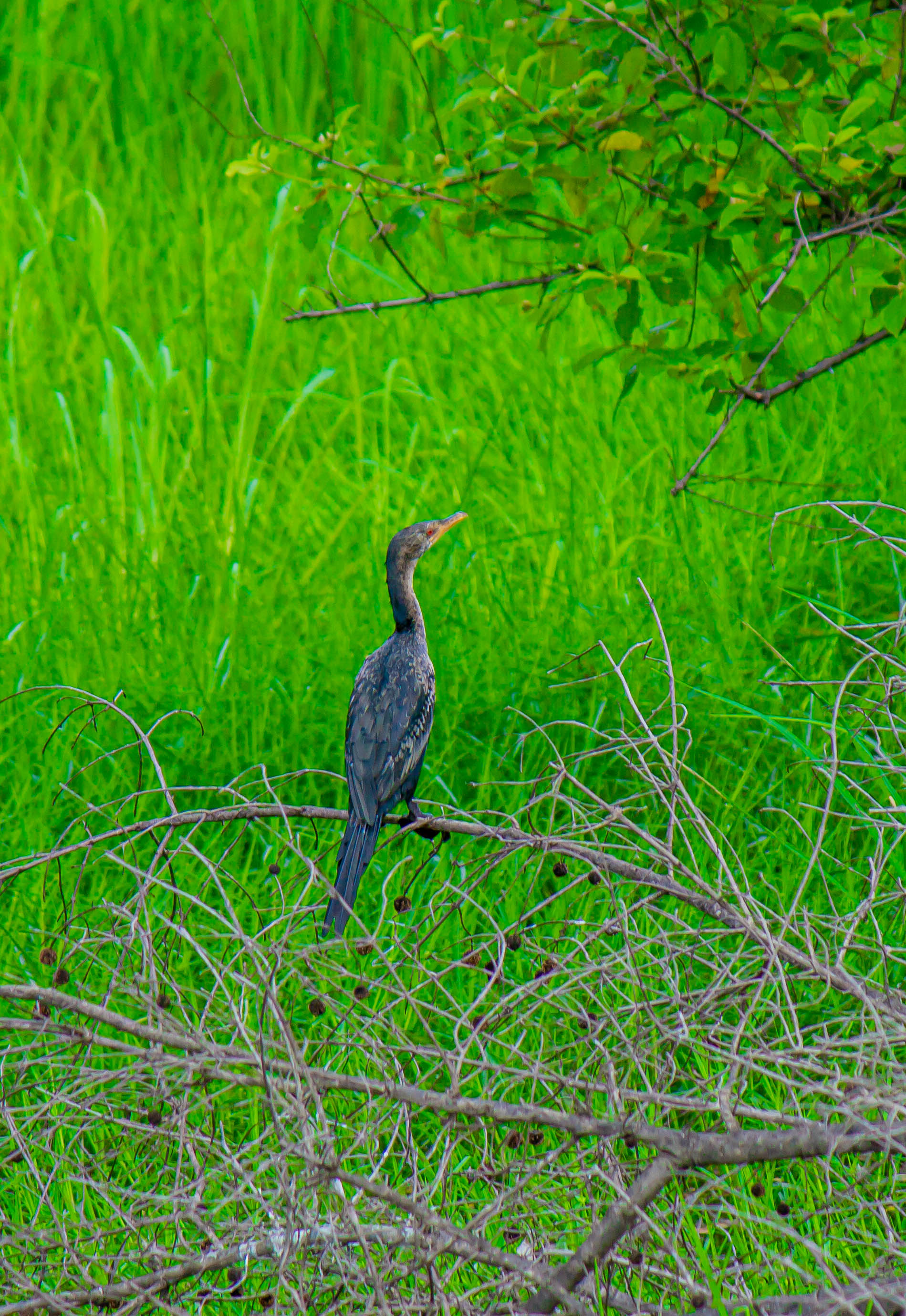
Reed cormorant in Ghana
