= Bingo (snack) =

Indian snack food brand

- Product type: Snack foods
- Produced by: ITC Limited
- Country: India
- Introduced: 2007; 19 years ago
- Markets: India

Bingo! is a snacks brand of potato chips owned by ITC Limited. It was introduced in India in 2007 as part of ITC's entry into the packaged snacks market. The brand has products such as potato chips, Bingo Tedhe Medhe and Bingo Mad Angles.

== History ==
ITC introduced Bingo! in 2007. At the time, the Indian packaged snacks market included brands operated by companies such as PepsiCo and Parle Products. According to Business Standard, ITC conducted research into consumer preferences before introducing the brand and developed a range of flavours based on Indian foods and then launched the brand in 2007. The initial product was potato chips, followed by other extruded snacks and namkeens. Later, Bingo Mad Angles was introduced as a triangular snack, with the wider flavour range including flavours such as achaar, masala, Peri Peri, and more. In 2008, Business Standard reported that Bingo had gained a 16% share of the national branded snacks market approximately ten months after its launch.

== Products ==
Bingo's products include potato chips, Bingo Mad Angles and Bingo Tedhe Medhe.
