= Cigarettes and Other Tobacco Products Act =

2003 Indian legislation

Cigarettes and Other Tobacco Products (Prohibition of Advertisement and Regulation of Trade and Commerce, Production, Supply and Distribution) Act, 2003

Parliament of India
- Long title: An act to prohibit the advertisement of, and to provide for the regulation of trade and commerce in, and production, supply and distribution of, cigarettes and other tobacco products and for matters connected therewith or incidental thereto.
- Citation: Act No. 32 of 2003
- Enacted by: Parliament of India
- Enacted: 9 April 2003 (Rajya Sabha) 30 April 2003 (Lok Sabha)
- Assented to: 18 May 2003
- Commenced: 1 May 2004

The Cigarettes and Other Tobacco Products (Prohibition of Advertisement and Regulation of Trade and Commerce, Production, Supply and Distribution) Act, 2003 or COTPA, 2003 is an Act of Parliament of India enacted in 2003 to prohibit advertisement of, and regulate the trade and commerce in, the production, supply and distribution of cigarettes and other tobacco products in India.

== Background ==
The Act was enacted by the Parliament to give effect to the Resolution passed by the 39th World Health Assembly, urging the member states to implement measures to provide non-smokers protection from involuntary exposure to tobacco smoke.

=== Provisions ===
- The Act prohibits smoking of tobacco in public places, except in special smoking zones in hotels, restaurants and airports and open spaces. Places where smoking is restricted include auditoriums, movie theatres, hospitals, public transport (aircraft, buses, school's, trains, metros, monorails, taxis,) and their related facilities (airports, bus stands/stations, railway stations), restaurants, hotels, bars, pubs, amusement centres, offices (government and private), libraries, courts, post offices, markets, shopping malls, canteens, refreshment rooms, banquet halls, discothèques, coffee houses, educational institutions and parks. Smoking is allowed on roads, inside one's home or vehicle. The meaning of open space has been extended to mean such spaces which is visited by public, and includes open auditorium, stadium, bus stand.
- Advertisement of tobacco products including cigarettes is prohibited. No person shall participate in advertisement of tobacco product, or allow a medium of publication to be used for advertisement of tobacco products. No person shall sell video-film of such advertisement, distribute leaflets, documents, or give space for erection of advertisement of tobacco products. However, restricted advertisement is allowed on packages of tobacco products, entrances of places where tobacco products are sold. Surrogate advertisement is prohibited as well under the Act.
- Tobacco products cannot be sold to person below the age of 18 years, and in places within 100 yards radius from the outer boundary of an institution of education, which includes school colleges and institutions of higher learning established or recognized by an appropriate authority.
- Tobacco products must be sold, supplied or distributed in a package which shall contain an appropriate pictorial warning, its nicotine and tar contents. Cigarette packets are required to carry pictorial warnings of a skull or scorpion or certain prescribed pictorial warnings along with the text SMOKING KILLS and TOBACCO CAUSES MOUTH CANCER in both Hindi and English.
- The Act also gives power to any police officer, not below the rank of a sub-inspector or any officer of State Food or Drug Administration or any other officer, holding the equivalent rank being not below the rank of Sub-Inspector of Police for search and seizure of premises where tobacco products are produced, stored or sold, if he suspects that the provision of the Act has been violated.
- A person who manufactures tobacco products and fails to adhere to the norm related to warnings on packages on first conviction shall be punished with up to 2 years in imprisonment or with fine which can extend to Rs. 5000, in case of subsequent conviction shall be punished with up to 5 years in imprisonment or with fine which can extend to Rs. 10000.
- A fine up to Rs. 200 can be imposed for smoking in public place, selling tobacco products to minors, or selling tobacco products within a radius of 100 metres from any educational institution.
- A person who advertises tobacco products shall on first conviction shall be punished with up to 2 years in imprisonment or with fine which can extend to Rs. 1000, in case of subsequent conviction shall be punished with up to 5 years in imprisonment or with fine which can extend to Rs. 5000.
- The Act repealed The Cigarettes (Regulation of Production, Supply and Distribution) Act, 1975
- The owner/manager/in-charge of a public place must display a board containing the warning "No Smoking Area - Smoking here is an offence " in appropriate manner at the entrance and inside the premises. In place where tobacco products are sold must display appropriate messages like "Tobacco Causes Cancer" and "Sales of tobacco products to a person under the age of eighteen years is a punishable offence under law".

== See also ==
- Smoking in Bollywood
- Smoking in India
- Tobacco control
