= Engage Perfumes =

Indian fragrance brand

Engage
- Product type: Fragrance
- Current owner: ITC Limited
- Country: India
- Introduced: 2013
- Markets: India
- Website: https://www.engageshop.in/

Engage Perfumes (also known as Engage) is an Indian fragrance brand owned by ITC Limited and launched in May 2013. Its range includes deodorants and eau de parfum products.

== History ==
ITC launched Engage in May 2013. The initial range consisted of three pairs of deodorants for men and women: Rush and Blush, Mate and Spell, and Urge and Tease. Engage is part of ITC Limited's personal care products Business. Its products are sold through retail and online channels in India.

In July 2014, The Economic Times reported that Engage had recorded an 8.1% volume share of India's urban deodorant market in May 2014, based on Nielsen India data. The report also gave Engage a 6.6% share by value. In February 2016, Engage entered the perfume-spray segment.

By 2017, Engage's perfume portfolio consisted of eight variants, four for women and four for men.

In 2017, ITC introduced Engage ON pocket perfumes. It was later expanded into four variants: Yin, Yang, Femme and Homme.

In 2018, Engage launched its range of eau de parfum products and sports deodorant.

In March 2019, The Times of India reported that Engage was India's second-largest deodorant brand, behind Fogg Perfumes, citing Nielsen India data that gave it nearly 11% of the national deodorant market. The brand crossed ₹300 crore in sales in that fiscal.

In November 2019, ITC appointed actors Kartik Aaryan and Tara Sutaria as Engage's brand ambassadors.

== Products ==
Engage's product portfolio has included deodorants, pocket perfumes, and eau de parfum products.

In 2023, ITC launched a gender-neutral fragrance called One Soul.

In 2024, it introduced an eau de toilette range of four variants.

In 2026, it launched Engage Brazilian Maracuja eau de parfums coinciding with its entry in the roll-on segment with antiperspirant products.

== Marketing ==
In December 2017, Engage partnered with author Durjoy Datta for a digital campaign called Pocketful O' Stories, based on short user-submitted stories. The campaign received an award at the Abby Awards in 2017. It was also listed as a winner in the 2018 Kyoorius Creative Awards.

In October 2017, Business Standard reported that Engage held a 10.7% share of India's deodorant market, ranking second behind Fogg, according to Nielsen data. The report also noted the brand's performance in urban markets including Kolkata, Mumbai, Bengaluru and Hyderabad.

In December 2018, The Economic Times reported that Engage had become the second-largest brand in India's deodorant market by value, with a 10.5% market share and sales of ₹298 crore during January–September 2018. The report, citing Nielsen data, also identified Engage as one of the fastest-growing brands in the category, with 30.6% value growth over the previous year.

In August 2017, The Drum reported on Engage's advertising campaign The Fantasy, developed by J. Walter Thompson. The campaign used the concept of "playful chemistry" between couples as part of the brand's positioning in the fragrance category.

In April 2017, ETBrandEquity reported on ITC's introduction of Engage On, a range of pocket perfumes for men and women designed for on-the-go use. The report discussed the product's positioning around changing consumer lifestyles and its advertising campaign, developed by J. Walter Thompson.
