= Suriya =

Indian actor and film producer (born 1975)

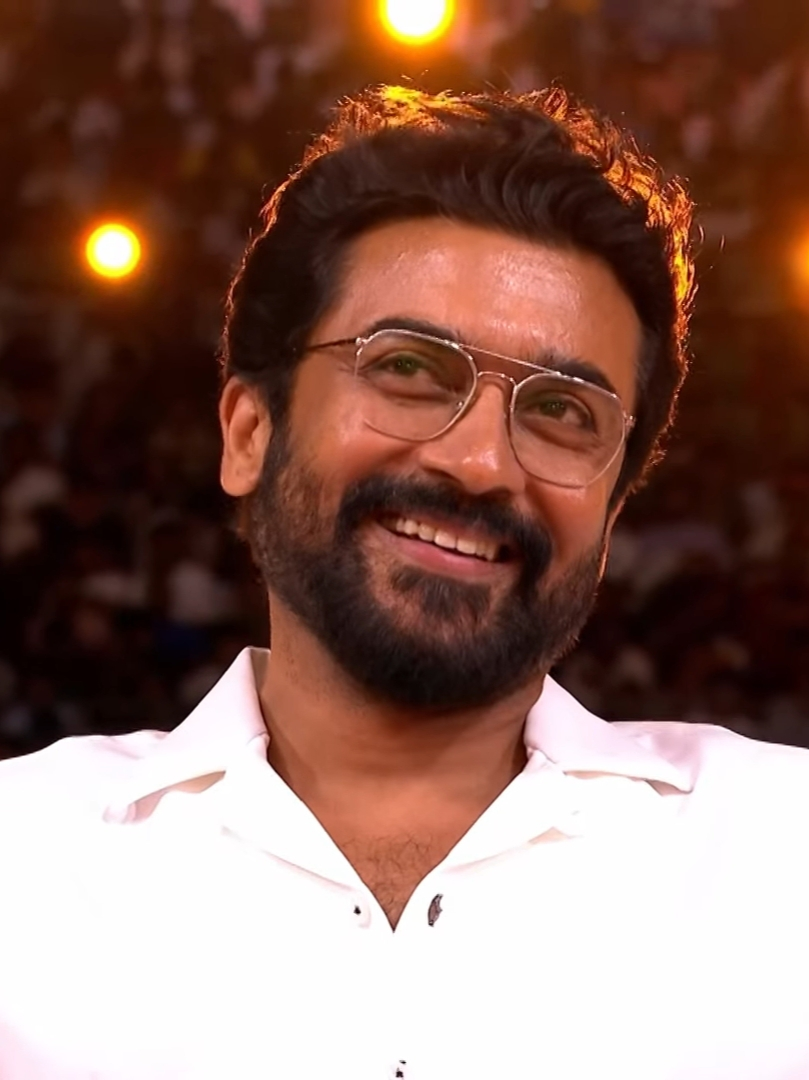
- Suriya in 2025
- Born: Saravanan Sivakumar; 23 July 1975 (age 51); Madras (now Chennai), Tamil Nadu, India
- Other name: The One
- Education: Loyola College, Chennai
- Occupations: Actor; film producer
- Years active: 1997–present
- Works: Full list
- Spouse: Jyothika (m. 2006)
- Children: 2
- Father: Sivakumar
- Relatives: Sivakumar family
- Awards: Full list

Saravanan Sivakumar (born 23 July 1975), known professionally as Suriya, is an Indian actor and film producer who primarily works in Tamil cinema. One of the highest-paid Tamil film actors, Suriya is considered as one of the finest actors of Indian cinema. A recipient of numerous accolades including two National Film Awards, seven Filmfare Awards South and ten Tamil Nadu State Film Awards, Suriya has featured seven times in Forbes India's Celebrity 100 list.

The eldest of actor Sivakumar's children, Suriya made his debut in Nerukku Ner (1997) at the age of 22. He landed his breakthrough role in Nandhaa (2001) and then had his first major commercial success with the thriller Kaakha Kaakha (2003). Following award-winning performances of a conman in Pithamagan (2003) and a hunchback in Perazhagan (2004), he played a man suffering from anterograde amnesia in the 2005 blockbuster Ghajini. He rose to stardom with dual roles of a father and son in Gautham Vasudev Menon's semi-autobiographical Vaaranam Aayiram (2008). His status as an action star was established with roles of a smuggler in Ayan (2009), and an aggressive cop in the Singam trilogy. He also found success with the science fiction films 7 Aum Arivu (2011) and 24 (2016) and then went on to work in critically acclaimed films like Soorarai Pottru (2020) and Jai Bhim (2021), the former of which earned him the National Film Award for Best Actor.

Suriya began Agaram Foundation, which funds various philanthropic activities, in 2006. In 2013, Suriya founded the production house 2D Entertainment. He is married to actress Jyothika, whom he co-starred with in 7 films.

== Early life and education ==
Suriya was born as Saravanan on 23 July 1975 in Madras (now Chennai), Tamil Nadu, to actor Sivakumar and his wife Lakshmi. Suriya has two younger siblings, a brother Karthi, who is an actor and a sister Brindha, who is a playback singer. His mother tongue is Tamil.

Suriya attended Padma Seshadri Bala Bhavan School and St. Bede's Anglo Indian Higher Secondary School in Chennai. He later obtained his under graduate degree in B.Com from Loyola College, Chennai.

== Career ==
=== Early career (1997–2002) ===
Prior to his career in films, Suriya worked at a garment exports factory for eight months. He did not reveal himself to his boss as Sivakumar's son, but his boss ultimately learnt the truth himself. He was initially offered the lead role by Vasanth in his film Aasai (1995), but he rejected the offer citing a lack of interest in an acting career and the offer went to Ajith Kumar. He later debuted in Vasanth's 1997 film Nerrukku Ner, produced by Mani Ratnam when he was 22 years of age. The stage name "Suriya" was bestowed to him by Ratnam to avoid a clash of names with established actor Saravanan. The name "Suriya" was frequently used for characters in Ratnam's films. Vijay, who co-starred with him in the film, would also go on to become a leading contemporary actor in Tamil cinema.

This was followed by a series of roles in commercially unsuccessful films in the late 1990s. In 1998, he starred in the romantic film Kaadhale Nimmadhi. In July the same year, he had another release Sandhippoma. Subsequently, he acted with Vijayakanth in the film Perianna (1999), directed by S. A. Chandrasekhar. That year, he also appeared opposite Jyothika in Poovellam Kettuppar. A critic from The New Indian Express noted, "The-romantic part has little novelty, but Jyothika and Surya perform with bouncy exuberance." His only release in 2000 was Uyirile Kalanthathu, again opposite Jyothika. Suriya confessed that he struggled due to lack of confidence, memory power, fighting or dancing skills in his early career, but it was actor Raghuvaran, one of his mentors, who advised him to create his own identity, rather than stay under his father's shadow.

This series of failures was broken in 2001 when Suriya starred in two box office successes. He first starred in Siddique's comedy film Friends, also co-starring Vijay. His major break came with the action drama Nandhaa, which was directed by Bala. Playing the role of an ex-convict who is very attached to his mother, he received the Tamil Nadu State Film Award for Best Actor for his performance, in addition to his first nomination for the Filmfare Award for Best Actor – Tamil. S. R. Ashok Kumar from The Hindu noted, "Suriya as the young rustic man has reached a new milestone in acting." Suriya had three film releases in 2002: the romantic drama Unnai Ninaithu opposite Laila and Sneha, the action drama Sri opposite Shrutika and Gayatri Jayaraman, and the romantic drama Mounam Pesiyadhe opposite Trisha. His performance in Mounam Pesiyadhe received positive response and earned him his second nomination for the Filmfare Award for Best Actor – Tamil.

=== Experimental roles and success (2003–2007) ===
The year 2003 proved to be a turning point in Suriya's career when he starred in Gautham Vasudev Menon's Kaakha Kaakha opposite Jyothika, a film about the life of a police officer. The film received positive reviews and Guru Subramaniam from Rediff.com stated, "Suriya as Anbu Selvan fits the role and this film is certainly a career high for him". The film emerged as Suriya's first major blockbuster at the box office and earned him his third nomination for the Filmfare Best Actor – Tamil Award. His portrayal of a happy-go-lucky village crook with a comic touch in Bala's Pithamagan, co-starring Vikram, won him the Filmfare Award for Best Supporting Actor – Tamil. The film was a box office success too.

This success was followed by his dual roles in Perazhagan, as an aggressive boxer and a handicapped phone booth keeper. The film emerged as a commercial success at the box office, and won Suriya his first Filmfare Award for Best Actor – Tamil. Praising his performance, Malathi Rangarajan of The Hindu wrote, "At no point are you allowed to feel that it is the same actor who is playing the physically challenged Chinna and the rough, ardently-in-love Karthik — therein lies [Perazhagan's] strength". In the same year, he portrayed the role of a student leader in Mani Ratnam's political drama Aayutha Ezhuthu along with R. Madhavan and Siddharth. The film received high critical acclaim and was also commercially successful.

Maayavi opposite Jyothika was his first release of 2005. Suriya further consolidated his position with the psychological thriller, Ghajini directed by A. R. Murugadoss. Co-starring with Asin, he played the role of a businessman suffering from anterograde amnesia. Ghajini emerged as a blockbuster at the box office and was the third highest-grossing Tamil film of the year. Suriya's performance was unanimously praised, with a reviewer from Sify citing that "the film is driven by Suriya's riveting performance". The film was dubbed in Telugu under the same name and was again a box office success, earning him fame in Andhra Pradesh. Suriya received his fifth nomination for the Filmfare Award for Best Actor – Tamil for his performance in the film. The film established Suriya among the highest paid Tamil actors. Later that year, he worked in Hari's action film Aaru, which was moderately successful at the box office. A reviewer cited, "Suriya keeps you riveted to the seats with another wholesome effort".

In 2006, Suriya appeared in a cameo role in June R. Later that year, he starred opposite Jyothika and Bhumika Chawla in N. Krishna's film Sillunu Oru Kaadhal. The film took a strong opening. It had an average response from critics, but his performance was praised, with a reviewer citing, "Suriya pitches in with yet another fantastic performance, be it the responsible husband and father, or the cool dude at college". In 2007, his only release was director Hari's Vel, where he reunited with Asin, following Ghajini. The film, which featured him in dual roles, was commercially successful.

=== Continued commercial success and stardom (2008–2013) ===
Gautham Vasudev Menon's drama Vaaranam Aayiram was Suriya's only release of 2008 and was his second film with Menon post Kaakha Kaakha. Playing dual roles for the third time in his career, Suriya appeared as father and son, with both characters demanding scenes shot throughout their lives ranging from scenes as a 16-year-old to scenes as a 65-year-old. During the production of the film, Suriya described the project as "unique" and "straight from the heart", describing the physical hardships he endured during the making. He lost weight and prepared a six pack for the film through an eight-month fitness regime without steroids. The film featured him opposite Simran, Sameera Reddy and Divya Spandana and became commercially successful at the box office upon release. Pavithra Srinivasan labelled the film as his "magnum opus", citing that he is "perfect" and that the film for him is a "justified triumph". Similarly, critics cited his performance as "outstanding" and claimed that the film "works because of his performance", whilst other reviewers claimed the film was an "out and out Suriya show". His performance earned him his second Filmfare Award for Best Actor – Tamil, a Tamil Nadu State Film Award Special Prize and the Vijay Award for Best Actor.

In 2009, Suriya's first release was K. V. Anand's action-thriller Ayan, where he played a smuggler. He appeared alongside Tamannaah Bhatia. The film was shot extensively across Tanzania, Namibia, Malaysia and India and featured acrobatic stunts by Suriya, without the use of a stunt double. Upon release, it received positive reviews, with critics citing the film as a "must watch" and Suriya's performance was yet again acclaimed and he found himself nominated for leading awards and won the Vijay Award for Entertainer of the Year, in addition to his seventh nomination for the Filmfare Award for Best Actor – Tamil. The film's success saw him emerge as the most profitable leading actor in Tamil films, following a hattrick of large commercial hits, with film journals suggesting that his success was due to "experiments within the commercial format" and he was successful in "avoiding being typecast". Ayan was the highest-grossing Tamil film of 2009. His next film, K. S. Ravikumar's action entertainer Aadhavan also achieved commercial success, while Suriya's depiction of a hitman was praised. A critic from Sify labelled it as an "out and out Suriya show", stating that "the film rides on the magic of the actor, and his zany shenanigans alone makes it worth a watch" and Rediff.com cited that "he sings, dances, and fights with absolute sincerity, but when he looks at you with tears in his eyes in an emotional scene tailor-made for him, the applause hits the roof", concluding that it is "completely his film".

"I am a huge fan of [Suriya]. I even watched Singam in Hindi; but after someone told me that the Tamil version was better, I saw it with subtitles."

— MS Dhoni, then-captain of Indian cricket team in 2016

Suriya's first release of 2010 was his 25th film, Singam directed by Hari, in which he played the role of a police officer, starring alongside Anushka Shetty. The film received positive reviews with The Hindu reviewer noting, "Suriya shows that be it a performance-oriented role or a formulaic concoction he can deliver", while Sify stated, "Ultimately it is Suriya who carries the film to the winning post. His passion and the way he brings an ordinary regular larger-than-life hero character alive on screen is lesson for other commercial heroes." The film won Suriya his second Vijay Award for Best Entertainer, in addition to his eighth nomination for the Filmfare Award for Best Actor – Tamil, and subsequently went on to become the second highest-grossing film of the year. Suriya expanded to Telugu and Hindi films with Ram Gopal Varma's political drama Rakta Charitra. The film was released in Tamil as Ratha Sarithiram, which was partly dubbed and partly reshot. Rajeev Masand noted, "The film belongs to Suriya, and is watchable only for the sheer presence of the Southern star, and for the intensity he brings to his part." Suriya then appeared alongside R. Madhavan and Trisha in a song in Manmadhan Ambu.

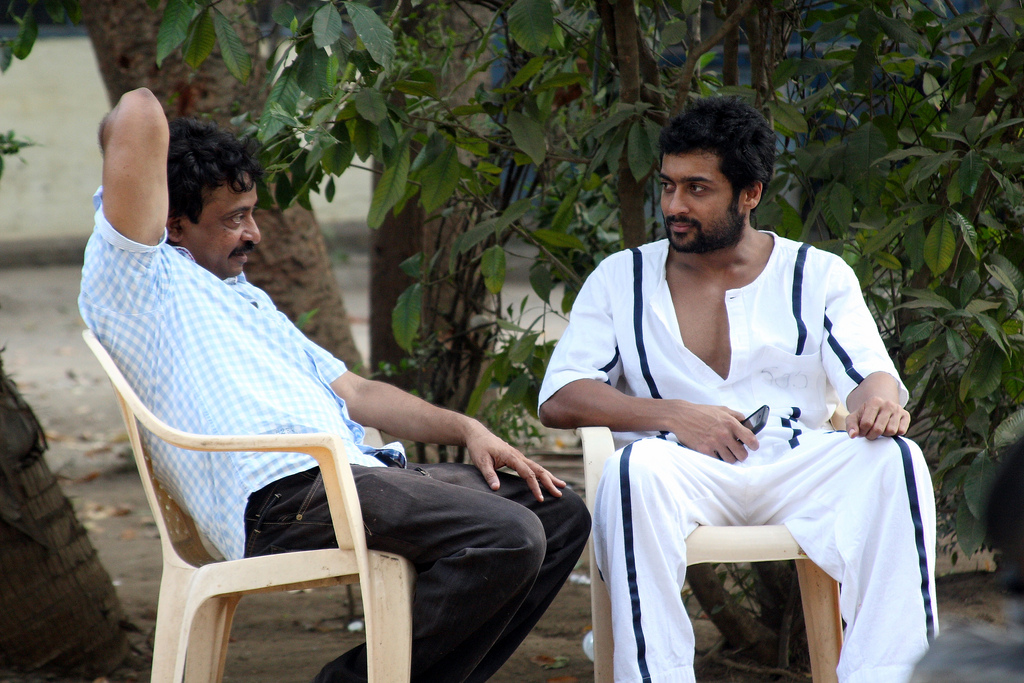
Suriya at the sets of Rakta Charitra with director Ram Gopal Varma

Following two special appearances in 2011, in K. V. Anand's Ko and Bala's Avan Ivan, Suriya featured in AR Murugadoss's science fiction action thriller 7 Aum Arivu. He co-starred with Shruti Haasan and played dual roles, as a circus artist and as the Buddhist monk named Bodhidharma, who lived in the 6th century. His performance earned him his ninth nomination for the Filmfare Award for Best Actor – Tamil. The film met with mixed reviews, but was a commercial success and became his first film to gross above ₹1 billion. N. Venkateswaran noted, "If the movie deserves a look, it is only because of the ever-dependable Suriya. He is a treat to watch as Bodhidharma."

His only 2012 release was K. V. Anand-directed action thriller Maattrraan. Acting with Kajal Aggarwal, he played the role of conjoined twins, Vimalan and Akhilan. The film received mixed reviews, and ended up being an average grosser. Critics however praised the film's technical aspects and VFX, in addition to Suriya's performance, which earned him his tenth nomination for the Filmfare Award for Best Actor – Tamil. His brother Karthi dubbed for one of his characters in the Telugu dubbed version. J Hurtado of Twitch Film said, "Suriya is called upon to carry the entire weight of the film on his shoulders as he is surrounded by a very one-dimensional supporting cast."

In January 2012, Suriya was named as the official host of the new game show to be presented on STAR Vijay, Neengalum Vellalam Oru Kodi, the Tamil version of Who Wants to Be a Millionaire?. It began airing on 27 February 2012 and ended on 12 July. His next film was Singam II opposite Anushka Shetty and Hansika Motwani, a sequel to his 2010 film Singam. The film released on 5 July 2013 to mixed reviews from critics. However, the film received a huge opening and emerged one of the highest grossing Tamil films of all time. Suriya was once again acclaimed for his portrayal of Durai Singam and his performance was hailed as "the film's backbone". Singam II was a box office hit and became his second ₹1 billion grosser. Suriya received his eleventh nomination for the Filmfare Award for Best Actor – Tamil for his performance in the film. Suriya distributed the film through his production company 2D Entertainment, founded in 2013. He had signed on to feature in Gautham Vasudev Menon's film Dhruva Natchathiram and reportedly waited for six months to start filming. However, in October 2013, he backed out due to differences with the director and due to the project lagging too much. In a 2013 interview with the Bangalore Mirror, film producer G. Dhananjayan called Suriya as the "biggest star" in contemporary Tamil cinema and claimed it was mainly because his popularity extended to Telugu and Malayalam speaking audiences as well.

=== Career struggles and sporadic success (2014–2019) ===
Suriya's only release in 2014 was Anjaan opposite Samantha Ruth Prabhu, directed by N. Lingusamy. It was released to mixed reviews, and was an average grosser at the box office. A reviewer of IANS wrote, "Suriya gives an earnest performance. But he's let down by a weak script, terrible performances by the rest of the cast and lengthy narrative." He also co-sang "Ek Do Theen Char" with Andrea Jeremiah for the film. In 2015, Suriya released 36 Vayadhinile starring Jyothika, the first production from his company 2D Entertainment. His next release was Venkat Prabhu's film Massu Engira Masilamani, opposite Nayanthara and Pranitha Subhash. Critics were all in praise for Suriya's performance, but the film received mixed reviews. Despite this, it emerged as a commercial success. In the same year, he produced Pasanga 2 (2015), directed by Pandiraj.

In 2016, Suriya appeared in the science-fiction action drama 24 directed by Vikram Kumar. Based on the concept of time-travel, he played triple roles of a scientist, his evil brother and the scientist's watch mechanic son, and starred alongside Samantha Ruth Prabhu and Nithya Menen. Sreedhar Pillai of Firstpost noted, "Suriya is fantastic, and does the difficult triple role of playing a scientist, lover boy and above all, the deadly villain with élan and style." Malini Mannath of The New Indian Express stated, "Suriya plays each role with relish. Of particular mention is his essaying of Athreya the antagonist. The actor showcasing a new dimension to his performance here, yet again surprises you with his splendid take on it." For his performance, Suriya won the Filmfare Critics Award for Best Actor – Tamil, in addition to his twelfth nomination for the Filmfare Award for Best Actor – Tamil. The film also grossed above ₹1 billion at the box office worldwide and was a commercial success.

His first film of 2017, Si3, the third film of the Singam franchise, saw him reprise his role opposite Anushka Shetty and Shruti Haasan. A box office success, it emerged another ₹1 billion grosser. His only release in 2018 was Thaanaa Serndha Koottam directed by Vignesh Shivan. He played a fake CBI officer opposite Keerthy Suresh, in this box office success. In the same year, he produced Kadaikutty Singam, starring his brother Karthi, and co-sang "Cha Cha Charey" with Karthi, Kharesma Ravichandran, Venkat Prabhu and Premgi Amaren for the movie Party. He had two releases in 2019: Selvaraghavan's NGK opposite Sai Pallavi and Rakul Preet Singh, and K. V. Anand's Kaappaan opposite Sayyeshaa, which marked the third time he collaborated with the director. Both films received mixed reviews from critics, but the latter emerged a commercial success. He also produced Uriyadi 2 and Jackpot in 2019.

=== Resurgence (2020–present) ===
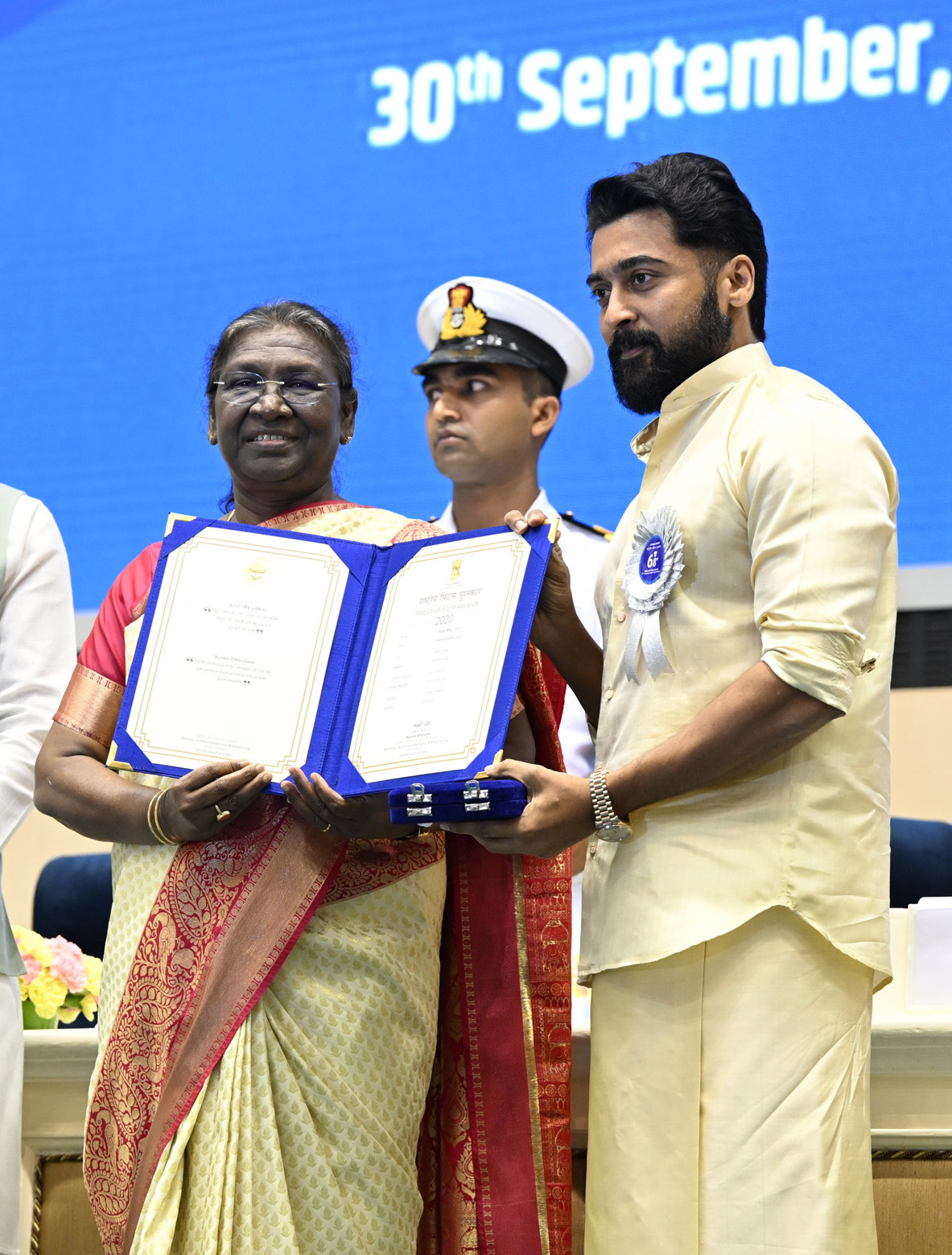
Suriya receiving the National Film Award for Best Actor for Soorarai Pottru

Suriya's career saw a resurgence with the biographical drama Soorarai Pottru, based on the life of Air Deccan founder Captain G. R. Gopinath. It was directed by Sudha Kongara, produced by Suriya's 2D Entertainment and co-produced by Guneet Monga under Sikhya Entertainment. He appeared alongside Aparna Balamurali and Paresh Rawal and played the lead role of Maara. The film was released directly on Amazon Prime Video in November 2020. It received widespread critical acclaim and won Suriya his first National Film Award for Best Actor, in addition to his third Filmfare Award for Best Actor – Tamil. The film became the most-watched regional language film in the history of Amazon Prime in India. Writing for Hindustan Times, Haricharan Pudipeddi stated, "The story of Maara is made to look even more inspiring because of Suriya, who is phenomenal and holds the show together." His next work that year was Navarasa, a Netflix anthology series produced by Mani Ratnam. It was released in August 2021. He acted in the 9th episode titled Guitar Kambi Mele Nindru, directed by Gautham Vasudev Menon. The artists, technicians and directors of the series contributed towards the film without remuneration, with only the costs of production being associated. The profits earned from the project were donated to the members of the Film Employees Federation of South India (FEFSI), who were affected by the COVID-19 pandemic.

Suriya then played Justice K. Chandru in T. J. Gnanavel's legal drama Jai Bhim. The film, which was his own production, was distributed by Amazon Prime Video in November 2021. It received positive reviews from critics, who praised the story, performances, direction and social message, and several publications listed the film as "one of the best Tamil and Indian films of 2021". Saibal Chatterjee from NDTV noted: "Suriya, stepping out manfully from his comfort zone, slips effortlessly and efficaciously into the skin - and spirit of Chandru." The film was shortlisted among the 276 films eligible for nomination at the 94th Academy Awards, but failed to make the final list of nominations. Jai Bhim also became the first Indian film to be featured on the Oscars' YouTube channel. Suriya won the Filmfare Award for Best Film – Tamil as producer of the film, and received his fourteenth nomination for the Filmfare Best Actor – Tamil for his performance in the film, but lost the award to his performance in Soorarai Pottru. The same year, he produced two films, Raame Aandalum Raavane Aandalum and Udanpirappe.

In 2022, Suriya's first film was Etharkkum Thunindhavan, also known under the initialism ET. The film, which was directed by Pandiraj and produced by Kalanithi Maran under Sun Pictures, featured him opposite Priyanka Mohan. It released to mixed reviews. The film was a moderate box office success. Following this, he appeared in a cameo as Rolex, a drug lord in Lokesh Kanagaraj's Vikram. Haricharan Pudipeddi stated: "Suriya's brief but powerful cameo is just the high one needs as you step out of Vikram". The film became one of the highest grossing Tamil films of all time. He also had a cameo appearance in R. Madhavan's Rocketry: The Nambi Effect. After the release of Etharkkum Thunindhavan, Suriya started work on Bala's Vanangaan. However, in December 2022, it was confirmed that he left the project due to differences with the director. Suriya's other productions in 2022 were Oh My Dog and Viruman.

With no film release in 2023, Suriya's first appearance in 2024 was a cameo in Sarfira, the Hindi remake of Soorarai Pottru which he co-produced with Akshay Kumar in the lead role. He then appeared in Siva's big budget film Kanguva (2024). The film was produced jointly by Studio Green and UV Creations, and was released to negative reviews. He played dual roles of a bounty hunter and a tribal chieftain opposite Disha Patani. The film was a box office failure. Latha Srinivasan stated, "Suriya is the heart and soul of Kanguva, but the film just doesn't do justice to his performance and commitment." In 2025, Suriya played an orphan raised by a gangster in Karthik Subbaraj's Retro, appearing alongside Pooja Hegde. The film was co-produced by Suriya and Stone Bench Films, and opened to positive reviews from critics. Avinash Ramachandran noted, "Suriya’s brilliant turn as Paari anchors the film. The director's vision allows him to deliver a performance that hasn’t come to the fore in a while." The film had the best opening of his career and went on to become a commercial success.

2026 saw Suriya appear in three highest-grossing Tamil films of the year: He first played the deity Vettai Karuppu in RJ Balaji's Karuppu. Rohit Panikker of Filmfare stated, "Suriya delivers one of his more restrained performances in recent years. He provide the film's strongest moments, his performance gives the story both emotional weight and dramatic credibility". Following this, he played a single father in Venky Atluri's Vishwanath & Sons, appearing alongside Mamitha Baiju. Yashaswini Sri noted, "Suriya is the film’s anchor and easily shines in the role. It is one of his most mature, likeable performances in a long time". In his last release, Suriya played a visually-impaired police officer, who solves a serial killer case in Scene, directed by Jithu Madhavan. Latha Srinivasan of NDTV noted, "Suriya seems to have had a great time playing Inba on screen, as he has an infectious energy about him. His comic timing and body language work well too". All three films became box office successes and emerged as some of the highest-grossing Tamil films of all time.

== Humanitarian and social causes ==
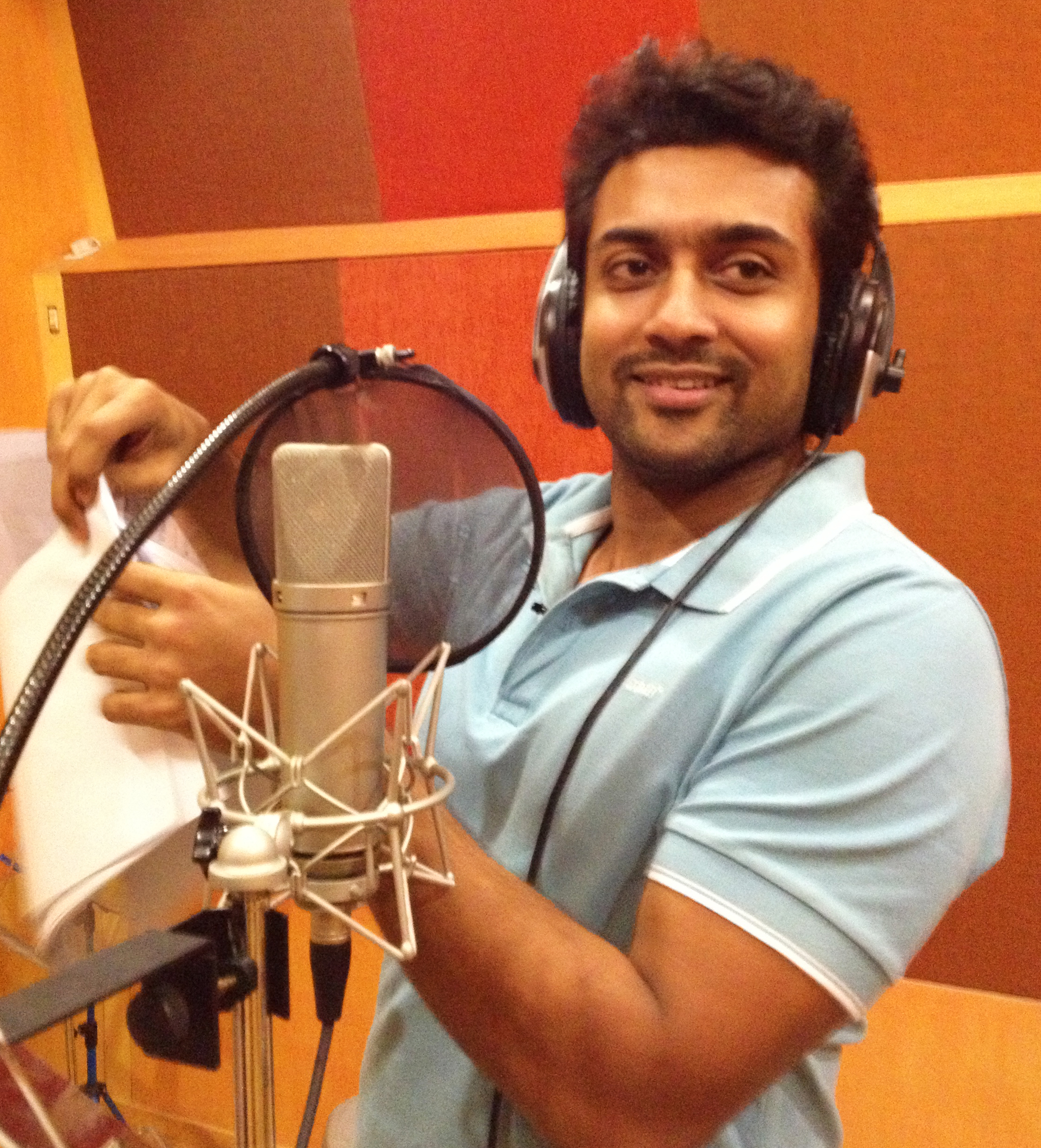
Suriya at a TeachAids campaign

Suriya has been a patron of Tamil Nadu Kidney Research Foundation since 2007. In the same year, he also acted in a short film on AIDS awareness. He has also lent his voice to other causes such as the "Save The Tigers" campaign, which aids in the protection and preservation of tigers in India, and "REACH", a non-profit that treats tuberculosis patients for free using supervised medication programs. In 2019, Suriya criticised the union government's Draft National Education Policy (NEP), claiming that several of its features would affect students from rural areas. He said the policy sought to impose entrance and qualifying examination on students and the three language formula in Tamil Nadu. His statements were criticized by BJP and AIADMK leaders.

Suriya issued a statement on National Eligibility cum Entrance Test (NEET) in September 2020 after three students committed suicide. He criticized the government for enacting laws that created inequalities and criticized the judiciary saying that "while the court is run through video conferencing, they have ordered students to take the exams in person during COVID-19". He compared NEET to "manuneethi" and a tale in the Mahabharata in which Drona demanded Ekalavya's thumb as payment for training, going on to suggest that "the skills and abilities of our children should not be determined by one test". He asked people to raise their voice against the NEET which "prevents medical courses to students from normal families". While Madras High Court judge S.M. Balasubramaniam urged the chief justice to take contempt action against Suriya, this was opposed by six retired judges. Suriya's wife Jyothika had on a separate occasion requested to contribute to schools and hospitals the same as temples. Although the Bharatiya Janata Party (BJP) and other right-wing organisations condemned them, they garnered widespread support from people advocating equality in access to healthcare and education.

== Philanthropy ==
In 2006, Suriya began Agaram Foundation, working to help children who drop out of school early in Tamil Nadu. Suriya revealed that he was inspired to begin the movement as a result of his father's own organisation, Sivakumar Educational Trust, which had been operating similar benefits on a smaller scale since the 1980s. With the Ministry of Education in Tamil Nadu, the foundation created a short commercial video outlining child poverty, labour and lack of education, titled Herova? Zerova?.

The film was written and produced by Sivakumar and also starred Vijay, Madhavan and Jyothika. Agaram sponsored 159 underprivileged students in 2010 for their higher education in various disciplines, and has continued to provide free seats and accommodation for pupils. Agaram Foundation works towards providing appropriate learning opportunities to the rural populace who do not otherwise have access to quality education. Through the foundation, Suriya has also managed to set up a platform for students to participate in workshops and improve communication skills, teamwork, goal setting and leadership. In 2025, Suriya donated ₹10 crore from his film Retro's profits to his educational NGO.

== Personal life ==
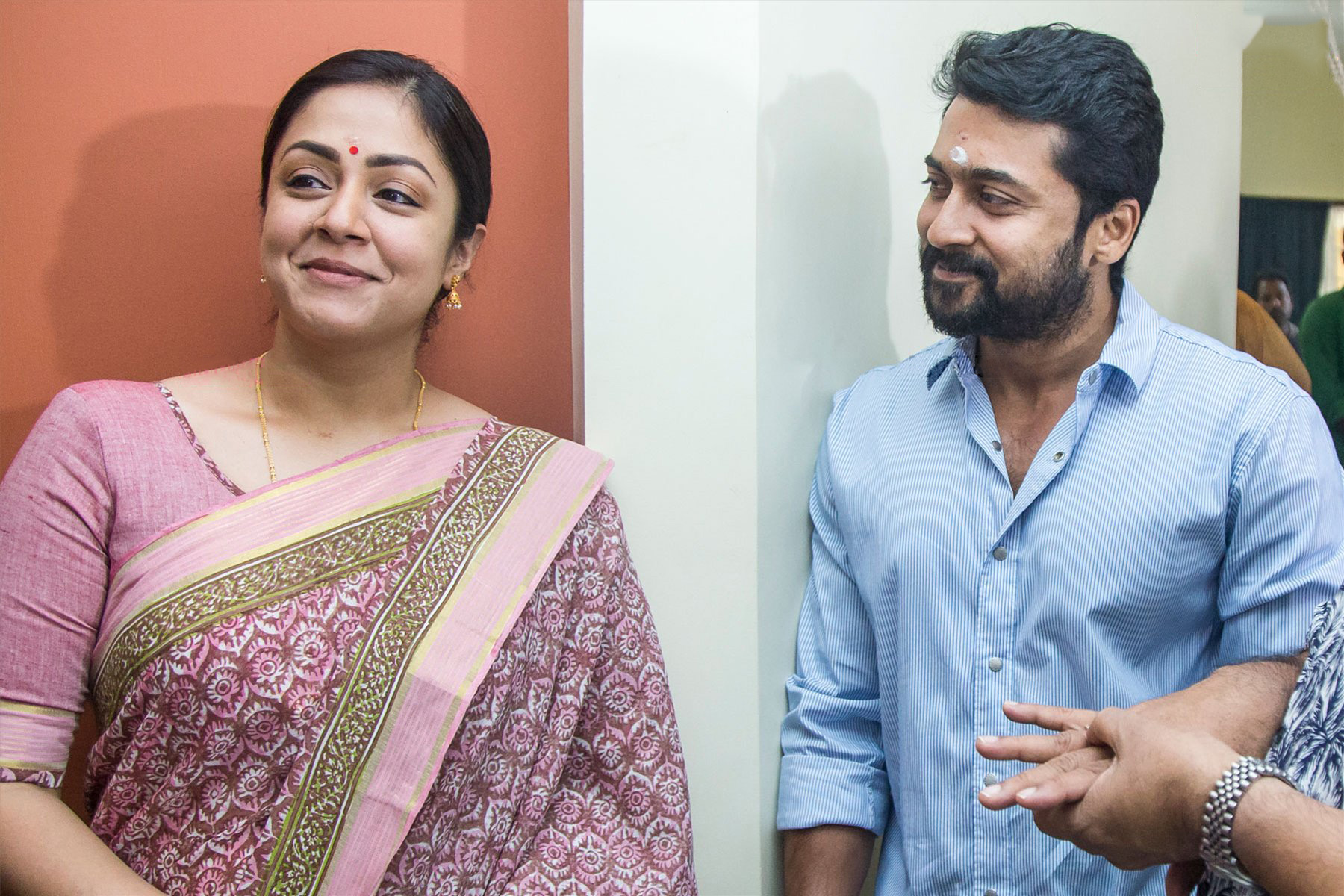
Jyothika and Suriya at the launch of the former's film Kaatrin Mozhi (2018)

Suriya married actress Jyothika on 11 September 2006 in Chennai. The couple met on the sets of their first film together Poovellam Kettuppar (1999), and eventually began dating. They have two children: a daughter (born 2007) and a son (born 2010).

== In the media ==
Suriya in 2024

Suriya is among the highest paid actors in Tamil cinema. For 2012, 2013, 2015, 2016, 2017, 2018, and 2026, Suriya was included in the Forbes India Celebrity 100 list which is based on the earnings of Indian celebrities. His peak ranking on the list was at the 25th place, in the year 2017. Suriya stood at the 9th place in their list of the most influential stars on Instagram in South cinema for the year 2021. In 2022, Suriya became the first South Indian actor to be invited to join the Academy of Motion Picture Arts and Sciences. He was among 397 eminent film personalities invited to join the academy for the 95th Academy Awards.

A research study conducted in 2023 by Indian Institute of Human Brands (IIHB) stated that Suriya was the highest-ranked celebrity in South India. The study was based on several attributes covering image, personality and other human factors. Suriya is also known for his versatility, often considered as a successor to actor Kamal Haasan. In Rediff.com's "Top Tamil Actors" list, Suriya was placed 3rd in 2005, 1st in 2008, 2009 and 2010, and 5th in 2012. Suriya became the 5th and 4th most tweeted about South Indian actor in 2020 and 2021, respectively, following his performances in Soorarai Pottru and Jai Bhim. In 2024, Suriya was placed 62nd on IMDb's List of 100 Most Viewed Indian Stars. His performance in 24 is regarded as one of the "100 Greatest Performances of the Decade" by Film Companion.

Suriya has been a celebrity endorser for several brands and products. In 2004, he was Pepsi's brand ambassador in Tamil Nadu along with R. Madhavan. He was chosen to represent TVS Motors, Sunfeast and Aircel in 2006. He had endorsed Saravana Stores, Bharathi Cements and Emami Navaratna products in 2010. In 2011, he had signed new deals with Nescafe, Close-Up and Zandu Balm, for the latter of which he appeared with actress Malaika Arora. In 2012, Suriya endorsed Malabar Gold & Diamonds. The commercials for Aircel and Nescafe featured Suriya and his wife Jyothika together. In 2013, he was honored at the Edison Awards as the Best Male Endorser in South India. In 2014, he promoted Complan energy drinks. In 2015, Suriya was named as the brand ambassador for Quikr and Intex Moblies. As of 2026, he endorses Malabar Gold & Diamonds.

== Filmography and accolades ==
Suriya has received two National Film Awards, seven Filmfare Awards South, and ten Tamil Nadu State Film Awards. He received National Awards for Best Actor and Best Feature Film for Soorarai Pottru (2020) at the 68th National Film Awards.
