= Yippie (disambiguation) =

Yippie usually refers to members of the Youth International Party, a radical counter-culture group founded in 1968.

Yippie or Yippee may also refer to:

- Yippee (noodles), a brand of instant noodles manufactured by ITC Limited, introduced in 2010
- Yippee TV, a Christian-based American children’s subscription video on-demand over-the-top streaming service
- Yippie Boat, nickname for Yard Patrol craft used by the United States Navy for training and research

== See also ==
- Yippy, a metasearch engine that grouped searched results into clusters
