= ITC Limited =

Indian conglomerate

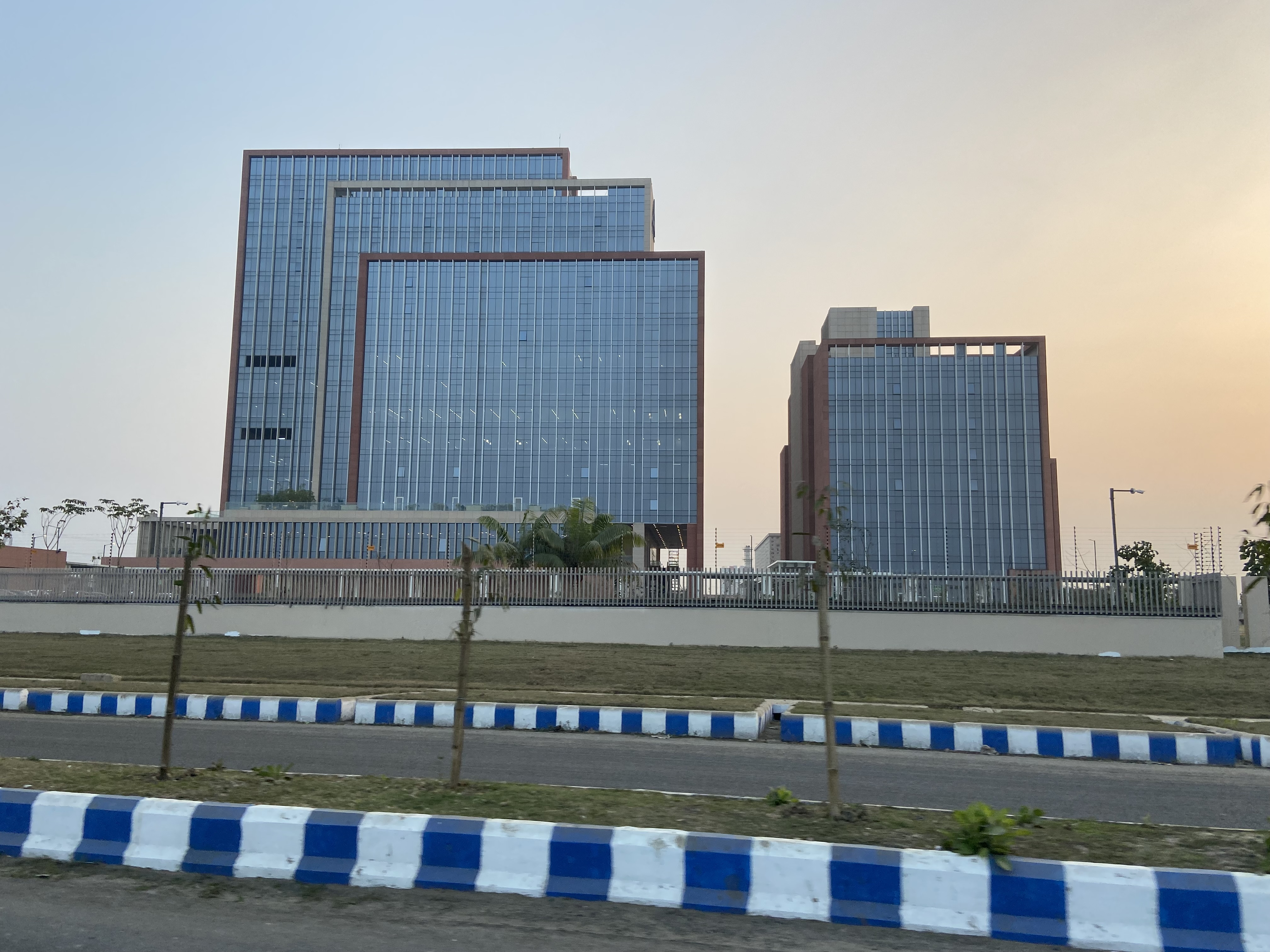
- ITC Infotech in New Town, Kolkata
- Formerly: Imperial Tobacco Company of India Limited (1910–1970); India Tobacco Company Limited (1970–1974); I.T.C. Limited (1974–2001); ITC Limited (2001–present)
- Type: Public
- Traded as: BSE: 500875; NSE: ITC; BSE SENSEX constituent; NSE NIFTY 50 constituent
- ISIN: INE154A01025
- Industry: Conglomerate
- Predecessor: W.D. & H.O. Wills
- Founded: 24 August 1910; 116 years ago
- Headquarters: Virginia House, Chowringhee Road, Kolkata, India
- Area served: Indian subcontinent; Gulf countries
- Key people: Sanjiv Puri (Chairman & MD)
- Products: Cigarettes; Fast-moving consumer goods; Paperboard & specialty papers; Packaging; Agri-commodities
- Brands: Gold Flake; Wills Navy Cut; Aashirvaad; Sunfeast; YiPPee!; Bingo!; Savlon; Fiama; Vivel; Classmate; Paperkraft; Mangaldeep; Engage
- Services: Information technology consulting & services; Agri-business services
- Revenue: ▲₹89,913.33 crore (US$9.6 billion) (FY2026)
- Operating income: ▲₹28,325.09 crore (US$3.0 billion) (FY2026)
- Net income: ▼₹21,018.15 crore (US$2.2 billion) (FY2026)
- Total assets: ▲₹93,792.38 crore (US$10 billion) (FY2026)
- Total equity: ▲₹72,873.02 crore (US$7.8 billion) (FY2026)
- Owner: British American Tobacco (25.5%); Life Insurance Corporation (15.2%); Specified Undertaking of the Unit Trust of India (7.8%)
- Number of employees: 22,481 (2026)
- Divisions: ITC Paperboards and Specialty Papers Division; ITC Infotech
- Website: www.itcportal.com

ITC Limited is an Indian conglomerate, headquartered in Kolkata. It has a presence across six business segments, namely FMCG, agribusiness, information technology, paper products, and packaging. It generates a plurality of its revenue from tobacco products.

In terms of market capitalization, ITC is the second-largest FMCG company in India and the third-largest tobacco company in the world.

== History ==
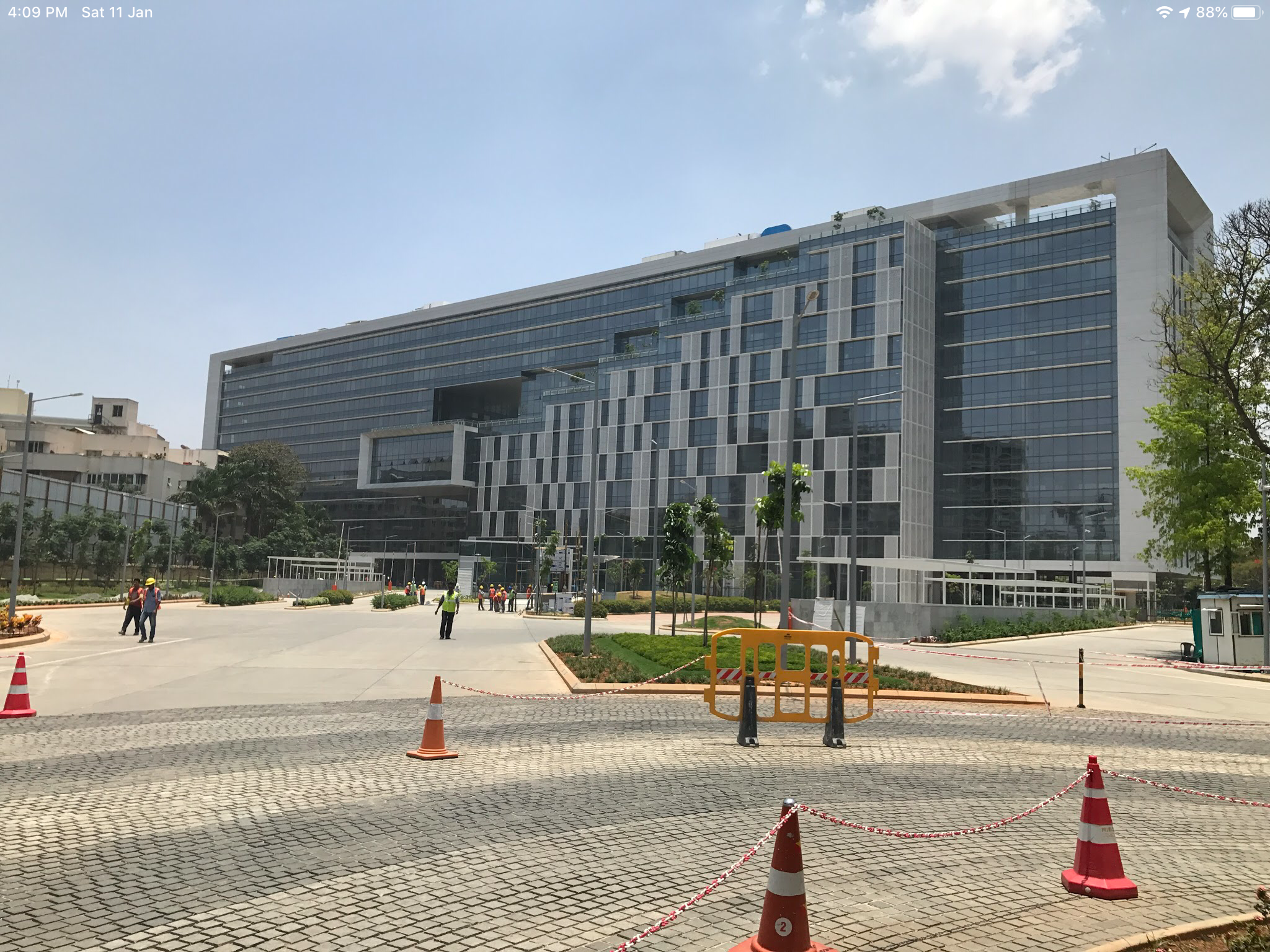
ITC Infotech campus in Bangalore

=== Tobacco business and early years ===
"ITC Limited" was originally named "Imperial Tobacco Company of India Limited", succeeding Imperial Brands and W.D. & H.O. Wills on 24 August 1910 as a British-owned company registered in Kolkata. Since the company was primarily based on agricultural resources, it ventured into partnerships in 1911 with farmers from the southern part of India to source leaf tobacco. Under the company's umbrella, the "Indian Leaf Tobacco Development Company Limited" was formed in Guntur district of Andhra Pradesh in 1912. The first cigarette factory of the company was set up in 1913 in Bangalore.

In 1928, construction began for the company's headquarters, the 'Virginia House' at Kolkata (Calcutta). ITC acquired Carreras Tobacco Company's factory at Kidderpore in 1935 to further strengthen its presence. ITC helped set up an indigenous cigarette tissue-paper-making plant in 1946 to reduce import costs significantly. Then, a factory for printing and packaging was set up in Madras in 1949. The company acquired the manufacturing business of Tobacco Manufacturers (India) Limited and the complementary lithographic printing business of Printers (India) Limited in 1953.

=== 2000s–present ===
In July 2023, ITC Limited's board of directors approved the demerger of its hotel business and the formation of a wholly owned subsidiary called ITC Hotels. The demerger came in to effect on 1 January 2025.

In March 2025, ITC announced the acquisition of the pulp and paper business of Aditya Birla Real Estate Limited for ₹3,498 crore (US$370 million).

In June 2025, ITC completed the acquisition of 100% share capital of Sresta Natural Bioproducts Pvt. Ltd. for ₹472.5 crore (US$50 million).

In April 2026, ITC announced that Sproutlife (the manufacturer of Brand YOGABAR) has become its subsidiary with 47.50% of share capital with ITC.

== Brands ==
Some brands of ITC limited include Aashirvaad, ITC Hotels, Bingo!, Vivek, Sunfeast, YiPPee!, Savlon, Fiama Di Wills, Classmate, Wills Navy Cut, Vivel, among others.

== Name ==
Established in 1910 as the Imperial Tobacco Company of India Limited, the company was renamed as the India Tobacco Company Limited in 1970 and later to I.T.C. Limited in 1974. In 2001 the company was renamed into ITC Limited, where "ITC" is no longer an abbreviation.

== Shareholding and listings ==
ITC's equity shares are listed on Bombay Stock Exchange (BSE), National Stock Exchange of India (NSE) and Calcutta Stock Exchange (CSE). The company's Global Depository Receipts (GDRs) are listed on the Luxembourg Stock Exchange. ITC is a constituent of two major stock market indices of India: BSE SENSEX and NIFTY 50 of NSE.

As of March 2024, British American Tobacco is the largest shareholder in the company with a 25.5% stake, followed by Life Insurance Corporation which holds 15.5%.

== Employees ==
ITC had 22,041 employees as of 30 March 2025.

ITC's former chairman and CEO Yogesh Chander Deveshwar (d. 2019) is a recipient of Padma Bhushan from the Government of India; he was named the seventh-best-performing CEO in the world by Harvard Business Review in 2013.

Meera Shankar, Indian ambassador to the USA between 2009 and 2011, joined the board of ITC Limited in 2012 as the first woman director in its history. She is an additional non-executive director of the company.

Sanjiv Puri is the Chairman & Managing Director of ITC Limited. Puri was appointed as a Whole time Director on the Board of ITC with effect from 6 December 2015, Chief Executive Officer in February 2017 and re-designated as the Managing Director in May 2018. He was appointed as the Chairman effective 13 May 2019.

== See also ==
- Smoking in India
- Godfrey Phillips India, the second-largest tobacco company
- Smoking in Bollywood
- List of largest companies in India
