= Aashirvaad =

Indian brand of staple food and kitchen ingredients

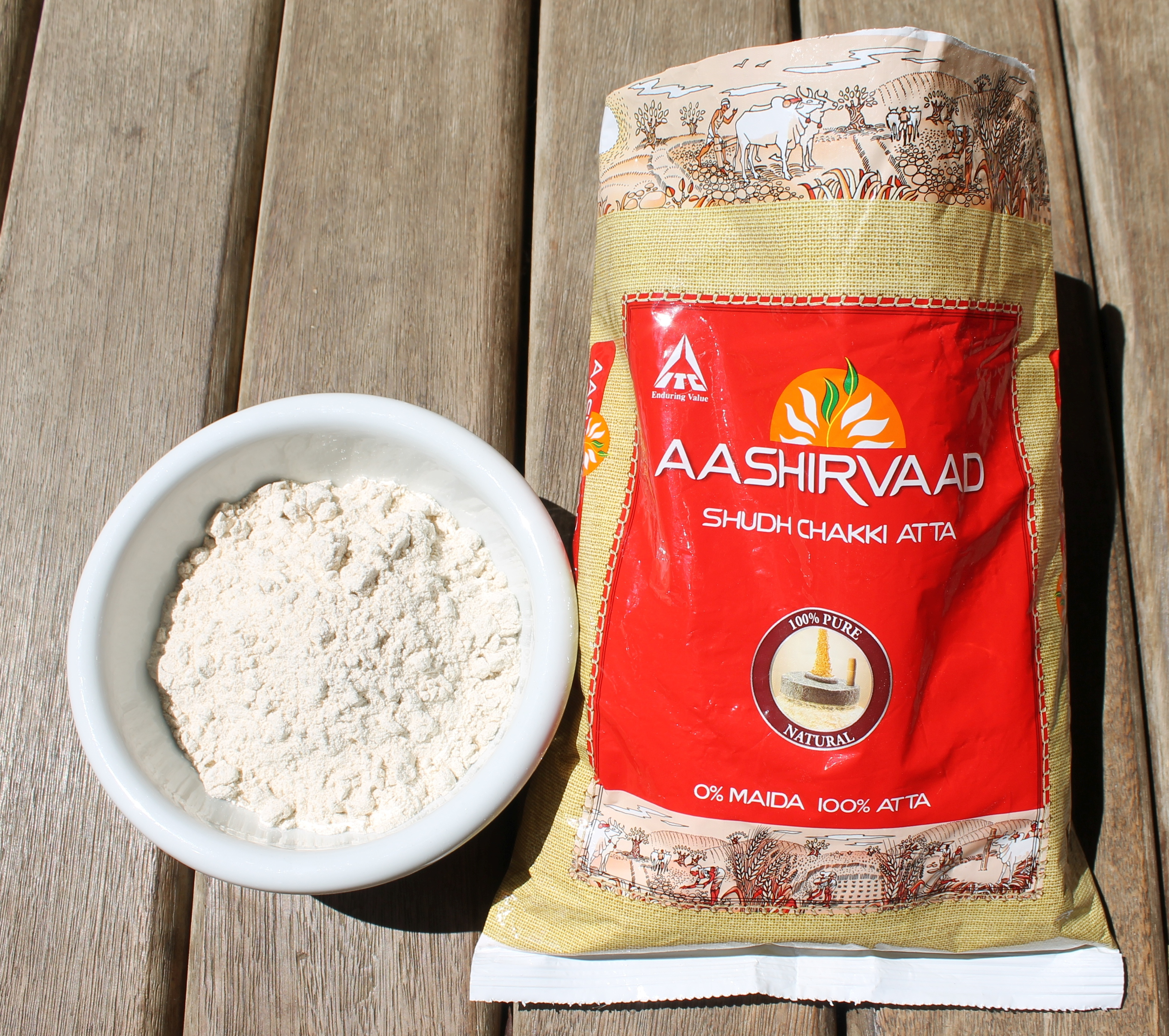
Aashirvaad Flour

Aashirvaad is a brand of staple food and kitchen ingredients owned by ITC Limited. The Aashirvaad brand was launched in 2002 and its range of products include atta, salt, spices, instant food mixes, dairy products, and superfoods.

== Products ==
=== Atta ===
ITC entered the branded atta (packaged wheat flour) market with the launch of Aashirvaad Atta in Bengal and Chandigarh on 26 May 2002. The product is now available all over India. The Aashirvaad package is PET Poly, with the design showcasing the farming process undertaken in the rural heartland of India in the form of a Madhubani art.

Aashirvaad Select Atta is made from Sharbati wheat which comes from Sehore district Madhya Pradesh.

Business Line reported that Aashirvaad brand was the market leader in packaged atta, with a market share of 28% and turnover of ₹4,200 crore (US$614.13 million) in 2018.

=== Salt ===
ITC launched branded packaged salt under the brand name Aashirvaad Salt on 26 March 2003.

=== Spices ===
ITC forayed into the branded spices market with the launch of Aashirvaad Spices in Northern India in May 2005. The offering currently consists of chili, turmeric, and coriander powder.

The company entered organic foods retailing in July 2007 with the launch of Aashirvaad Select Organic Spices comprising chili, turmeric and coriander powders.

=== Instant food mixes ===
This range, launched in March 2006, includes gulab jamun, rava idli, rice idli, rice dosa, dhokla, khaman, rasmalai and vada mix. In 2021, it entered the ready-to-mix Indian breakfast sector with instant poha, upma, sambar and suji halwa mixes.

=== Multi-purpose cooking paste ===
The ‘Aashirvaad’ Multi-Purpose cooking paste ‘Bhuna hua taiyaar masala’, is a fried paste of onions, tomatoes, ginger and garlic shallow fried in refined sunflower oil. It is a basic paste used for most North Indian dishes.

=== Dairy ===
Aashirvaad entered packaged dairy segment in 2015 with the launch of ghee. The dairy division also includes milk, curd, paneer, lassi and mishti doi sold under 'Aashirvad Svasti' brand.
