= Fiama =

Indian personal care brand

- Product type: Personal Care
- Current owner: ITC Limited
- Country: India
- Introduced: 15 September 2007; 19 years ago
- Ambassadors: Deepika Padukone; Sapna Bhavnani; Sara Ali Khan
- Tagline: Be Young

Fiama is an Indian personal care brand that offers shampoos, conditioner, bathing bars and shower gels. It is owned by ITC Limited, an Indian conglomerate with a market capitalization of US$40 billion and a turnover of $8 billion.

Launched on 15 September 2007, the brand was the second to roll out of ITC's personal care stable.

== History ==
Fiama was introduced by ITC Limited as part of the company’s expansion into the personal care sector in the late 2000s. Following initial launches of shampoos and shower gels, the brand was extended to include bathing bars and other hair and body care products. In 2013, ITC expanded the brand’s products to include soaps under the Fiama name, marking the company’s entry into personal care categories.

=== Men’s Grooming ===
In 2011, ITC Limited announced an extension of the Fiama portfolio into men’s grooming products, introducing shower gels and bathing care products intended for male consumers. The range was initially rolled out in select metropolitan markets.
