= Smoking in India =

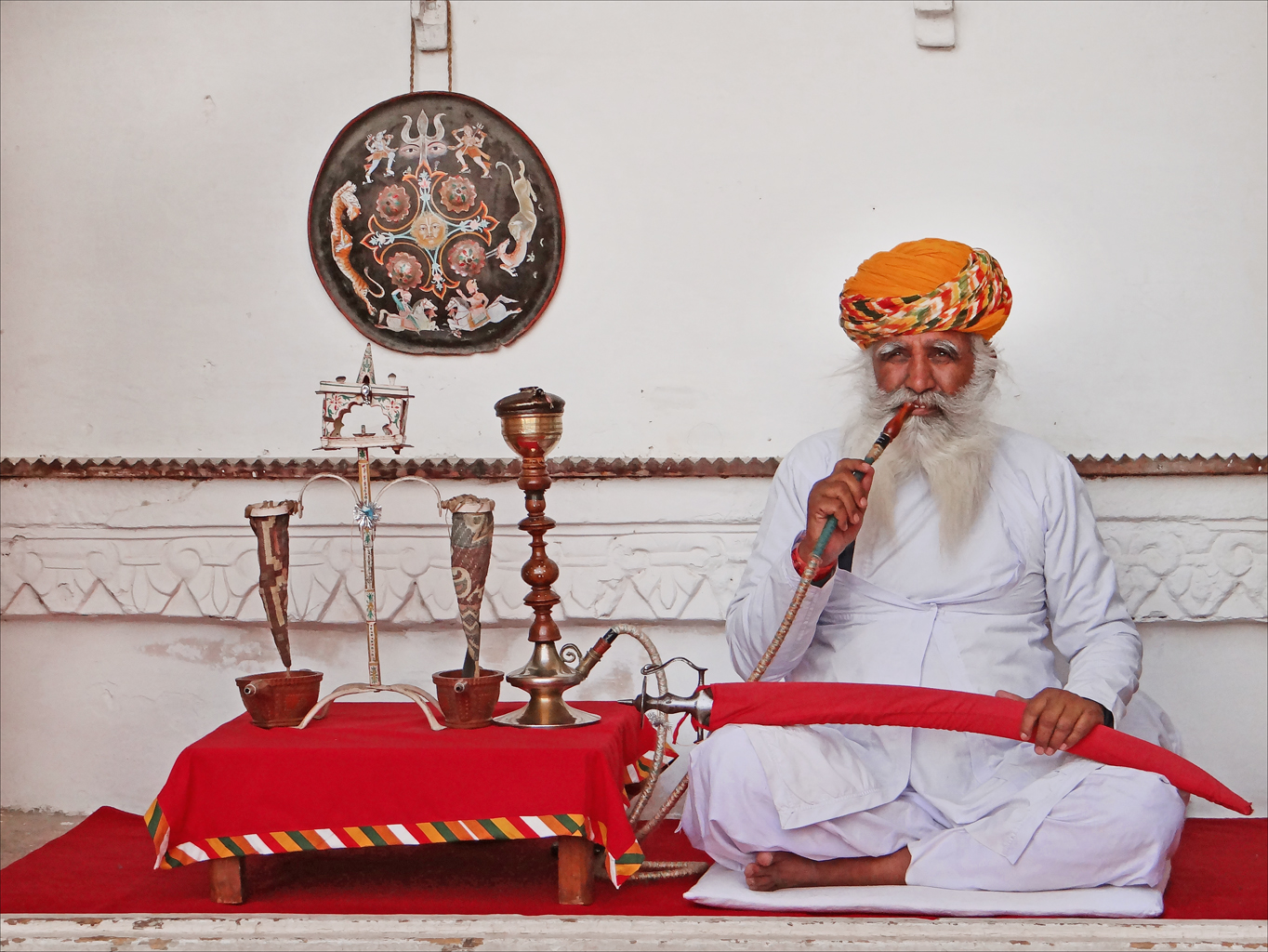
A Rajput Smoking through a hookah, Rajasthan, India.

Smoking in India is one of the oldest industries and provides employment to more than five million people directly and indirectly. India is the second-largest producer of tobacco in the world. Smoking has been known since at least 2000 BC when cannabis was smoked and is first mentioned in the Atharvaveda (compiled c. 1200 BC – c. 1000 BC). Fumigation (dhupa) and fire offerings (homa) are prescribed in the Ayurveda for medical purposes and have been practiced for at least 3,000 years while smoking, dhumrapana has been practiced for at least 2,000 years. Tobacco was introduced to India in the 17th century. It later merged with existing practices of smoking (mostly of cannabis).

Godfrey Phillips India Limited is an India-based company that operates in two segments: Cigarettes and tobacco products, and Tea and other retail products. It is the second-largest player in the Indian tobacco industry after ITC Limited.

Health warnings were introduced in 1975. Smoking in public places was prohibited nationwide from 22 October 2002. There are approximately 120 million smokers in India. According to the World Health Organization (WHO), India is home to 12% of the world's smokers. More than 1 million people die every year due to tobacco related illnesses. As of 2015, the number of men smoking tobacco in India rose to 108 million, an increase of 36%, between 1998 and 2015. As per recent report of WHO, nearly 267 million people consume some form of tobacco in India.

== History ==
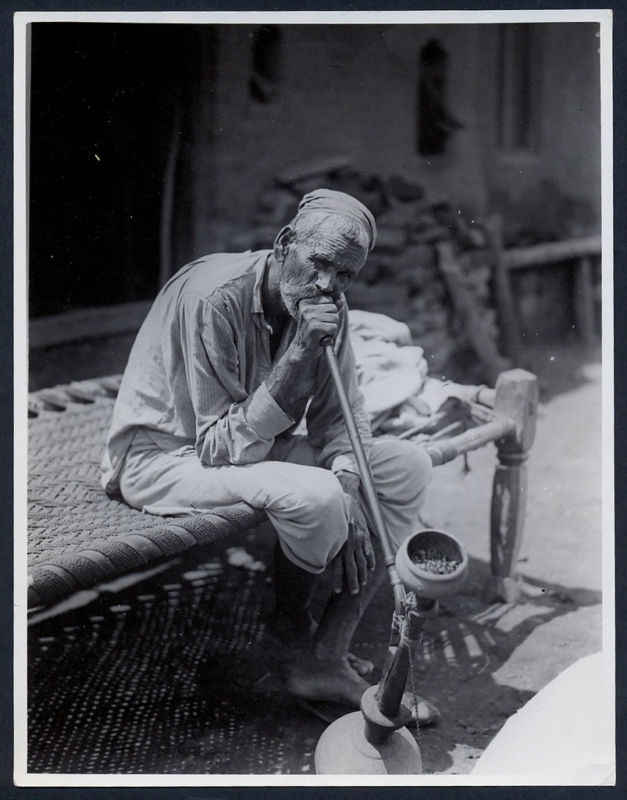
Man smoking a hookah in India, 1935

Cannabis smoking in India has been known since at least 2000 BC. Fumigation (dhupa) and fire offerings (homa) are prescribed in the Ayurveda for medical purposes and have been practiced for at least 3,000 years while smoking, dhumrapana (literally "drinking smoke"), has been practiced for at least 2,000 years. Fumigation and fire offerings have been performed with various substances, including clarified butter (ghee), fish offal, dried snakeskins, and various pastes molded around incense sticks and lit to spread the smoke over wide areas. The practice of inhaling smoke was employed as a remedy for many different ailments was not limited to just cannabis, but also various plants and medicinal concoctions recommended to promote general health. Before modern times, smoking was done with pipes with stems of various lengths, or chillums. Today dhumrapana has been replaced almost entirely by cigarette smoking, but both dhupa and homa are still practiced. Beedi, a type of handrolled herbal cigarette consisting of cloves, ground betel nut, and tobacco, usually with rather low proportion of tobacco, are a modern descendant of the historical dhumrapana.

Tobacco was introduced to India in the 17th century. It later merged with existing practices of smoking (mostly of cannabis). By the start of the 20th century, tobacco smoking, especially among the youth, had become so common that the more health-conscious sections of the intelligentsia began to take note of public smoking and widespread sale and marketing of tobacco products as a growing social menace.

== Landmark case ==
The Supreme Court in Murli S Deora vs. Union of India and Ors., recognized the harmful effects of smoking in public and also the effect on passive smokers, and in the absence of statutory provisions at that time, prohibited smoking in public places such as auditoriums, hospital buildings, health institutions, educational institutions, libraries, court buildings, public offices, public conveyances, including the railways.

"Tobacco is universally regarded as one of the major public health hazards and is responsible directly or indirectly for an estimated eight lakh deaths annually in the country. It has also been found that treatment of tobacco related diseases and the loss of productivity caused therein cost the country almost Rs. 13,500 crores annually, which more than offsets all the benefits accruing in the form of revenue and employment generated by tobacco industry".

— Supreme Court of India, Murli S. Deora vs Union of India And Ors on 2 November 2001

== Prevalence ==
There are approximately 130 million smokers in India. Around 267 million individuals (aged 15 and above) in India, accounting for 29% of all adults, were reported as tobacco consumers based on the Global Adult Tobacco Survey India conducted during 2016–17. According to the World Health Organization (WHO), India is home to 12% of the world's smokers. More than 1 million die each year due to tobacco in India. According to 2002 WHO estimates, 25% of adult males in India smoke. Among adult females, the figure is much lower at between 13 and 15%. About 13.5% of students below the age of 16 were current tobacco users and 9.3% were former tobacco users and three-quarters of students in India have never tried any form of tobacco. Smokeless tobacco is more prevalent than cigarettes or bidis in India.

According to the study, "A Nationally Representative Case-Control Study of Smoking and Death in India", tobacco will be responsible for 1 in 5 of all male deaths and 1 in 20 of all female deaths in the country by 2010. This means approximately 1 million Indians would die annually from smoking by 2010. According to the Indian Heart Association (IHA), India accounts for 83% of the world's heart disease burden, despite having less than 20% of the world's population. The IHA has identified a reduction in smoking as a significant target of cardiovascular health prevention efforts.

A survey conducted by the International Institute of Population Science and the Ministry of Health and Family Welfare, reveals that 56.6% of people in Kolkata smoke, the highest rate in the country. 82% of men and 23.5% of women smoke in Kolkata The highest number of beedi smokers is in Uttarakhand. According to a health ministry report released in 2008, an estimated 100 million individuals, primarily from the impoverished and illiterate segments of the population, are beedi smokers. The report further indicates that smoking beedis has resulted in 200,000 deaths caused by tuberculosis.

== Legislation ==
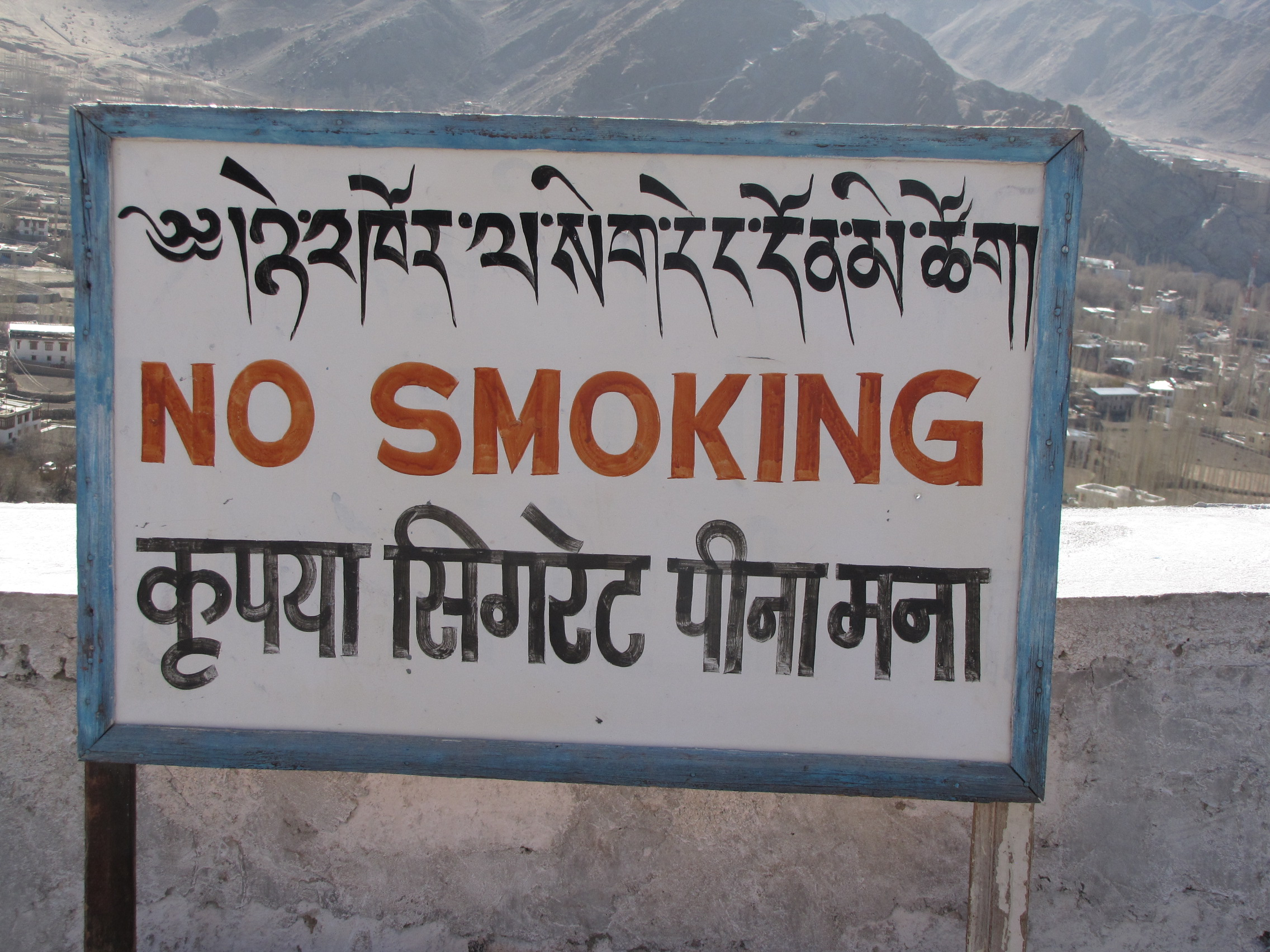
No smoking sign in Leh, Ladakh

The first legislation regarding tobacco control in India was the Cigarettes (Regulation of Production, Supply and Distribution) Act, 1975, which mandated specific statutory health warnings on cigarette packs in 1975.

The Cigarettes and Other Tobacco Products (Prohibition of Advertisement and Regulation of Trade and Commerce, Production, Supply and Distribution) Act, 2003, abbreviated to COTPA, received assent from the President on 18 May 2003. It came into force on 1 May 2004. The Act extends to the whole of India and is applicable to cigarettes, cigars, bidis, gutka, pan masala (containing tobacco), Mavva, Khaini, snuff and all products containing tobacco in any form.

Prohibition of sale of tobacco products in an area within 100 yards of any educational institution was brought into force from 1 December 2004.

=== Regional smoking bans ===
On 12 July 1999, Kerala became the first state in India to ban smoking in public places when a Division Bench of the Kerala High Court declared "public smoking as illegal first time in the history of whole world, unconstitutional and violative of Article 21 of the Constitution." The Bench, headed by Dr. Justice K. Narayana Kurup, held that "tobacco smoking" in public places (in the form of cigarettes, cigars, beedies or otherwise) "falls within the mischief of the penal provisions relating to public nuisance as contained in the Indian Penal Code and also the definition of air pollution as contained in the statutes dealing with the protection and preservation of the environment, in particular, the Air (Prevention and Control of Pollution), Act 1981."

In 2007, Chandigarh became the first city in India to become 'smoke-free'. However, despite there being some difficulties and apathy by the authorities the Smoke-Free Chandigarh project has been a success story. Taking a cue from the Chandigarh's success, cities like Shimla also followed the Smoke-Free Chandigarh model to become smoke-free. The success of Chandigarh had been widely recognised and the architect of smoke-free Chandigarh Hemant Goswami. was also awarded the Global Smoke-Free Partnership Award for the initiative.

=== Nationwide public smoking ban ===
Smoking in public places was prohibited nationwide from 2 October 2008 under the Prohibition of Smoking in Public Places Rules, 2008 and COTPA. The nationwide smoke-free law pertains only to public places. Places where smoking is restricted include auditoriums, cinemas, hospitals, public transport (aircraft, buses, trains, metros, monorails, taxis) and their related facilities (airports, bus stands/stations, railway stations), restaurants, hotels, bars, pubs, amusement centres, offices (government and private), libraries, courts, post offices, markets, shopping malls, canteens, refreshment rooms, banquet halls, discothèques, coffee houses, educational institutions and parks. Smoking is allowed inside one's home or vehicle. Then Health Minister Anbumani Ramadoss was quoted as saying, "Smoking on the road or the park will save others from the wrath of passive smoking". Smoking is also permitted in airports, restaurants, bars, pubs, discothèques and some other enclosed workplaces if they provide designated separate smoking areas. Anybody violating this law will be charged with a fine of ₹5000. The sale of tobacco products within 100 yards of educational institutions is also prohibited.

=== Pictorial warnings ===
Rules mandating pictorial warnings on tobacco products were notified on 3 May 2009 came into force from 31 May 2009 after several rounds of amendments and delays. Section 7 of COTPA deals with the "Display of pictorial health warning on all tobacco products packets". It prohibits the production, sale and import of cigarettes or any other tobacco product unless every package of cigarettes or any other tobacco product bears pictorial warnings on its label covering at least 40% of the package. The warnings are changed once a year. The law also prohibited more than two languages from being used on the pack to ensure that the specified warning is legible and prominent.

=== Hookah law ===
The nationwide smoking ban did not prohibit consumption of hookah in hookah bars. However, several cities in India have banned consumption of hookah in hookah bars. Police raids usually focus on punishing the owners and operators of hookah bars rather than the customers. Customers are usually fined while owners may face stiff fines and/or jail time. It is still legal to purchase hookahs at shops and consume them at home.

Authorities generally apply Section 144 (Unlawful assembly) of CrPC to shut down hookah bars. Governments also use the COTPA.

Hookah bars are banned in state of Maharashtra. Other regions that have bans are:

City/Region	State	Date of Ban	Remarks
–	Maharashtra	5 October 2011	Serving hookah is punishable by a fine of ₹1,200 (US$13). The BMC had banned hookah bars in Mumbai on 2 July 2011.
Jaipur	Rajasthan	9 December 2011	HC lifts ban on hookah bar in Rajasthan, says the ban is illegal.
Ludhiana district	Punjab	1 March 2012	
Gurgaon district	Haryana	3 April 2012	
Faridabad district	Haryana	2011	
Panchkula district	Haryana	30 November 2011	
Indore	Madhya Pradesh	20 May 2011	
Tamluk	West Bengal	2 December 2022	

=== E-cigarette law ===
Import, sales and consumption of electronic cigarettes is banned in India. Punjab became the first state in India to ban vaping in 2014. Following the incidents of mass confiscation of E-cigarettes from various teenagers in schools of Delhi and NCR, Indian government banned sale and import of e-cigarettes.

== Advertising ==
The Cable Television Network (Regulation) Amendment Bill, in force since 8 September 2000, completely prohibits cigarette and alcohol advertisements.

With effect from 2 October 2012, the government began screening two anti-tobacco advertisements, titled "Sponge" and "Mukesh", in movie theatres and on television, after the Central Board of Film Certification card is shown. It is also mandatory for theatres to display a disclaimer on-screen whenever smoking scenes are depicted in the movie. The "Sponge" and "Mukesh" ads were replaced by new ads, titled "Child" and "Dhuan", from 2 October 2013.

== In film ==
Bollywood has a long history of depicting characters smoking. According to a WHO study, tobacco is portrayed in 76% of Bollywood films, with cigarettes making up 72% of all the portrayals. Even though chewing tobacco and bidis account for the majority of tobacco use in India, cigarettes do make up 20% of the market. Prior to the 1990s, Bollywood portrayed smoking primarily as the vice of villains. The heroes portrayed in classic films were the "poor-but-proud" types. They rescued damsels in distress, performed heroic feats, and beat up gangs of bad guys single-handedly, but never did they risk their image by smoking on screen. Even the villains were classy about the tobacco use, smoking cigars in three-piece suits as they plotted their evil plans. However, the modern day heroes have brought a new tradition of "lighting up a cigarette while performing martial arts stunts." Influenced by Western cinema such as Hollywood films, the heroes in Bollywood movies now have more suave, attitude, and machismo, all which appears to be complemented by the use of cigarettes. As noted by the WHO study, the occurrence of "good guys" in films smoking or using tobacco has gone up from 27% in 1991 to 53% in 2002.

Proposed by the Ministry of Health and Family Welfare in May 2005, a smoking ban that prohibited films and television shows from displaying actors or actresses smoking went into effect on 2 October 2005. The Indian government felt that films were glamorizing cigarettes, and with nearly 15 million people going to see Bollywood films on a daily basis, then Health Minister Anubumani Ramadoss claimed that the ban would "protect the lives of millions of people who could become addicted to smoking under the influence of movies." Under the smoking ban, smoking scenes in any movie was prohibited, including any old or historical movies where, some argued, smoking was necessary to make the depiction accurate. If producers wished to show a character smoking, the scene would have to be accompanied by a note saying that smoking is injurious to health, along with disclaimers at the beginning and end of films.

During the tobacco ban, the use of tobacco was still implied in movies and television, even if it was not explicitly shown; it was "sung and danced about" instead. So Bollywood, in conjunction with tobacco companies, was still able to get around the smoking ban. Bollywood was also able to bypass the tobacco ban because of the lack of enforcement. Corruption within the government and police lead to officials not being successfully impose such policies, such as the smoking ban in cinema. As noted by one, "The authorities aren’t organized enough...I’ll just pay a bribe." The Delhi High Court subsequently overturned the ban in January 2009, citing that the ban was a form of censorship that restricted the right to freedom of speech.

Anti-smoking ads must be screened at the beginning of the film and during the interval. In addition, a disclaimer must be displayed on-screen during each scene where smoking is present. Woody Allen refused to release his film Blue Jasmine in India because of these requirements.

In August 2014, an expert committee headed by Malayalam film director, screenwriter, and producer Adoor Gopalakrishnan recommended that the Kerala government remove the warnings. He discouraged health warnings appearing as pop-ups during the film, saying they may instead be shown only before the film begins and during the interval, adding that fight sequences, item numbers and rape sequences are often shown in films without similar warnings.

== Key players ==
The market largely consists of small retailers and importers, but with a few organized players such as ITC with their brand EON, Godfrey Philips with the brands Zest and Verge, and Vape Stop which is an aggregator of international brands.

== See also ==
- Cigarettes and Other Tobacco Products Act
- Godfrey Phillips India, the second largest tobacco company
- ITC Limited, the largest tobacco company
- Koolimadu § Anti Tobacco Initiative
- Smoking in Bollywood
- Tobacco control
