= Suriya filmography =

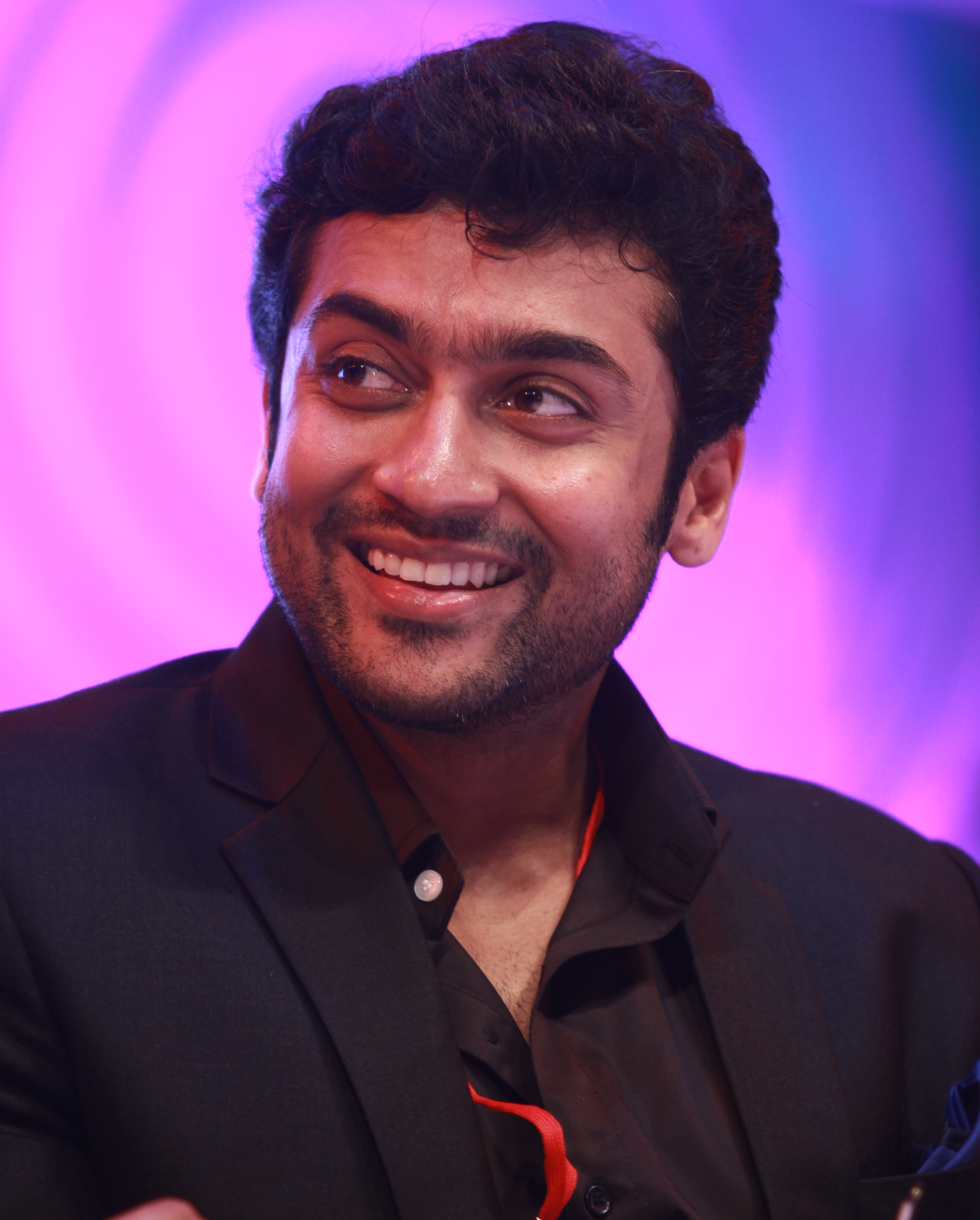
- Suriya in 2011
- Film: 47
- Television series: 1
- Television show: 1
- Music videos: 2
- Others: 2

Suriya is an Indian actor and film producer who works primarily in Tamil cinema. He made a commercially successful cinematic debut in Vasanth's Nerrukku Ner (1997). After few critical and commercial failures, Suriya collaborated with Vasanth again in Poovellam Kettuppar (1999), his first film with his future wife Jyothika.

In 2001, Suriya starred in Bala's Nandhaa as an ex-convict trying to find his place in society. The film was critically acclaimed and became a turning point in his career. His roles as a police officer in Gautham Vasudev Menon's Kaakha Kaakha (which became his first blockbuster) and a con artist in Bala's Pithamagan, established him as one of Tamil cinema's leading actors. Suriya's performances in both films were praised, winning him a Best Actor nomination for the former and the Best Supporting Actor for Pithamagan at the 51st Filmfare Awards South. The following year, he played dual roles—a hunchback and a college student—in Perazhagan. Suriya's performance was again praised, and he received his first Filmfare Best Actor award. He was also acclaimed for his performance as a student leader in Mani Ratnam's Aayutha Ezhuthu (2004).

In 2005, Suriya starred in three films: Maayavi, Ghajini and Aaru. His performance in Ghajini as a businessman with anterograde amnesia was widely praised, and was commercially successful. Maayavi and Aaru were moderately successful. Suriya then appeared in Vaaranam Aayiram (2008). His dual role as father and son earned him another Filmfare Best Actor award. Suriya's next three films were Ayan (2009), Aadhavan (2009) and Singam (2010). The latter, which was his most commercially successful film spawned two sequels: Singam II (2013) and Si3 (2017). (Note: Singam was Suriya's 25th film.) Suriya made his Hindi and Telugu cinema debuts in Ram Gopal Varma's gangster film Rakta Charitra 2 (2010).

Suriya then played the Buddhist monk and creator of Shaolin Kung Fu, Bodhidharma, and his fictional descendant Aravind, in 7 Aum Arivu (2011). His only 2012 release was Maattrraan, in which he played conjoined twins. In 2015, Suriya released 36 Vayadhinile, the first film from his 2D Entertainment production company. He played three roles for the first time in Vikram Kumar's successful science fiction film 24 (2016). His performance won the Filmfare Critics Award for Best Actor. Following Thaana Serndha Koottam (2018) and Kaappaan (2019), he worked in the acclaimed direct-to-streaming films Soorarai Pottru (2020) and Jai Bhim (2021). For Soorarai Pottru, Suriya won the National Film Award for Best Actor.

== Film ==
- All films are in Tamil, unless otherwise noted.

Key
†	Denotes films that have not yet been released

=== As actor ===
List of Suriya film credits as actor
Year	Title	Role	Notes	Ref.
1997	Nerrukku Ner	Suriya		
1998	Kaadhale Nimmadhi	Chandru		
1998	Sandhippoma	Vishwa Santhosh		
1999	Perianna	Suriya		
1999	Poovellam Kettuppar	Krishna Bharathi		
2000	Uyirile Kalanthathu	Suriya		
2001	Friends	Chandru		
2001	Nandhaa	Nandhaa		
2002	Unnai Ninaithu	Suriya		
2002	Sri	Sri		
2002	Mounam Pesiyadhe	Gautham		
2003	Kaakha Kaakha	Anbuselvan		
2003	Pithamagan	Sakthivel		
2004	Perazhagan	Chinna (Prem Kumar) and Karthik (Note: Suriya played two roles.)		
2004	Aayutha Ezhuthu	Michael Vasanth		
2005	Maayavi	Abhes Balayya		
2005	Ghajini	Sanjay Ramaswamy (Manohar) (Note: Suriya played a character with two or more names.)		
2005	Aaru	Aarumugam (Aaru)		
2006	June R	Raja	Cameo	
2006	Sillunu Oru Kaadhal	Gautham		
2007	Vel	Vetrivel and Vasudevan		
2008	Kuselan	Himself	Guest appearance in the song "Cinema Cinema"	
2008	Vaaranam Aayiram	Krishnan and Suriya		
2009	Ayan	Devaraj Velusamy (Deva)		
2009	Aadhavan	Madhavan Subramaniam (Aadhavan)		
2010	Singam	Durai Singam	25th film	
2010	Rakta Charitra 2	Yeturi Suryanarayana Reddy	Telugu-Hindi bilingual film; Partially reshot in Tamil as Ratha Sarithiram	
2010	Manmadan Ambu	Himself	Guest appearance in the song "Oyyale"	
2011	Ko	Himself	Guest appearance in the song "Aga Naga"	
2011	Avan Ivan	Himself	Guest appearance	
2011	7 Aum Arivu	Bodhidharma and Aravind		
2012	Maattrraan	Akhilan and Vimalan Ramachandran		
2013	Chennaiyil Oru Naal	Himself	Guest appearance	
2013	Singam II	Durai Singam		
2014	Ninaithathu Yaaro	Himself	Guest appearance	
2014	Anjaan	Raju Bhai (Krishna)		
2015	Massu Engira Masilamani	Masilamani (Mass) and Sakthivel (Sakthi)		
2015	Pasanga 2	Dr. Thamizh Nadan		
2016	24	Athreya, Manikandan and Sethuraman (Note: Suriya played three roles.)		
2017	Si3	Durai Singam		
2018	Thaanaa Serndha Koottam	Nachinarkiniyan (Iniyan) / Uthaman		
2018	Kadaikutty Singam	Himself	Guest appearance	
2019	NGK	Nandha Gopalan Kumaran (NGK)		
2019	Kaappaan	Kathiravan (Kathir)		
2020	Soorarai Pottru	Nedumaaran Rajangam (Maara)		
2021	Jai Bhim	K. Chandru		
2022	Etharkkum Thunindhavan	A. R. Kannabiran		
2022	Vikram	Rolex	Cameo	
2022	Rocketry: The Nambi Effect	Himself	Guest appearance	
2024	Sarfira	Unnamed businessman (Note: His character is introduced as the "King of Silk Trade" and an investor in Deccan Air.)	Mid-credits cameo; Hindi film	
2024	Kanguva	Kanguva and Francis Theodore		
2025	Retro	Paarivel "Paari" Kannan (Jada Muni)		
2026	Karuppu	Karuppuswamy / Saravanan		
2026	Vishwanath & Sons	Sanjay Vishwanath		
2026	Scene	DSP Inbaraj		
2027	Suriya48 †	TBA	Filming	

=== As producer ===
List of Suriya film credits as producer
Year	Title	Notes	Ref.
2015	36 Vayadhinile		
2015	Pasanga 2		
2016	24		
2017	Magalir Mattum		
2018	Kadaikutty Singam		
2019	Uriyadi 2		
2019	Jackpot		
2020	Ponmagal Vandhal		
2020	Soorarai Pottru		
2021	Raame Aandalum Raavane Aandalum		
2021	Udanpirappe		
2021	Jai Bhim		
2022	Oh My Dog		
2022	Viruman		
2024	Sarfira	Hindi film	
2024	Meiyazhagan		
2025	Retro	Co-produced with Jyothika	
2025	Leading Light	Documentary	
2026	Scene		

=== Voice actor ===
List of Suriya film credits as a voice actor
Year	Title	Actor	Notes	Ref.
2007	Guru	Abhishek Bachchan	Tamil dubbed version	
2007	Taare Zameen Par	Aamir Khan	Tamil dubbed version	
2017	Ghazi	—N/a	Narrator for the Tamil dubbed version	
2020	Ponmagal Vandhal	—N/a	Narrator	

=== As distributor ===
List of Suriya film credits as distributor
Year	Title	Notes	Ref.
2013	Singam II		
2017	Kadugu		
2019	Sillu Karuppatti		
2022	Gargi		
2026	My Lord		

== Television ==
List of Suriya television credits
Year	Title	Role	Network	Notes	Ref.
2012–2013	Neengalum Vellalam Oru Kodi	Himself	Star Vijay	Game show; Host (season 1); Participant (season 2)	
2021	Navarasa	Kamal	Netflix	Episode: "Guitar Kambi Mele Nindru"	
2024	Nayanthara: Beyond the Fairytale	Himself	Netflix		

== Discography ==
List of Suriya film music credits
Year	Film	Song	Notes	Ref.
2014	Anjaan	"Ek Do Teen"	Composed by Yuvan Shankar Raja; Co-sang with Andrea Jeremiah	
TBA	Party	"Cha Cha Charey"	Unreleased film Composed by Premgi Amaran; Co-sang with Karthi, Kharesma Ravichandran, Venkat Prabhu and Premgi Amaren	
2020	Soorarai Pottru	"Maara Theme"	Composed by G. V. Prakash Kumar	
2020	Aakaasam Nee Haddhu Ra	"Maha Theme"	Telugu dubbed version	
2025	Retro	"Love Detox"	Co-sung with Punya Selva, Santhosh Narayanan; Composed by Santhosh Narayanan	
2026	Vishwanath & Sons	"The Wedding Song"	Tamil and Telugu version; Composed by G. V. Prakash Kumar	

== Music video appearances ==
List of Suriya music video credits
Year	Title	Role	Performer(s)	Notes	Ref.
2016	"Spirit of Chennai"	Himself	C. Girinandh		
2017	"Maatrangal Ondre Dhaan"	Himself	Nivas K. Prasanna		

== Short film ==
List of Suriya short film credits
Year	Title	Role	Notes	Ref.
2005	Inaintha Kaigal	Himself		
2008	Herova? Zerova?	Himself	Also producer	

== See also ==
- List of awards and nominations received by Suriya
