= Sunfeast =

Indian food brand

- Product type: Biscuits, confectionery, instant noodles, beverages
- Current owner: ITC Limited
- Country: India
- Introduced: July 2003
- Markets: India, International

Sunfeast is an Indian food brand made by the conglomerate ITC Limited. It was launched in July 2003.

== History ==
In July 2003, ITC Limited launched Sunfeast, the range included glucose, marie and cream biscuits.

In 2005, Sunfeast launched Pasta Treat, it was made of durum wheat. It was India's first instant pasta with sauce maker inside.

In 2005, Sunfeast launched Dark Fantasy, a premium biscuit range with creme biscuits.

In 2014, Sunfeast launched Farmlite, a digestive biscuit range with 2 variants, Oats & Almonds and Oats & Raisins.

In 2018, Sunfeast launched Wonderz Milk, starting Sunfeast in its beverage range, it is available exclusively in Tamil Nadu, Kerala and later Karnataka

In late January 2025, Sunfeast launched Wowzers, a cracker, it has a 14-layer design for more crunchiness.

== Products ==
- Farmlite: Farmlite is a digestive biscuit range launched in 2014 with 2 variants, Oats & Almonds and Oats & Raisins and has since expanded the range. In 2016, Sunfeast launched Farmlite Digestive All Good, which would compete with McVitie's, Parle and Britannia. In 2023, as part of their ITC Mission Millet initiative, Sunfeast launched Farmlite Super Millets Cookies available in two variants, Multi Millet & Choco-chip Multi Millet.
- Dark Fantasy: Dark Fantasy is a premium biscuit range launched in 2005 with the crème biscuits. In November 2010, Sunfeast launched Choco Fills, its most popular product. In 2021, Sunfeast launched Dark Fantasy Desserts which is a centre-filled cookie with 2 variants, Choco Chunks and Choco Nut Dipped.
- Mom's Magic: Mom's Magic is a cookie product line that includes variants with cashews and almonds. The range has expanded to include products such as Ghee Roasted Nuts cookies and butter cookies with sugar glazing.

== Sunfeast Open ==
Between 2005 and 2008, the brand was the title sponsor of the Sunfeast Open, an international WTA Tour tennis tournament held in Kolkata.

== See also ==
- ITC Limited
- Sunfeast Open
- Yippee (noodles)
