= Fogg (brand) =

Indian deodorant brand

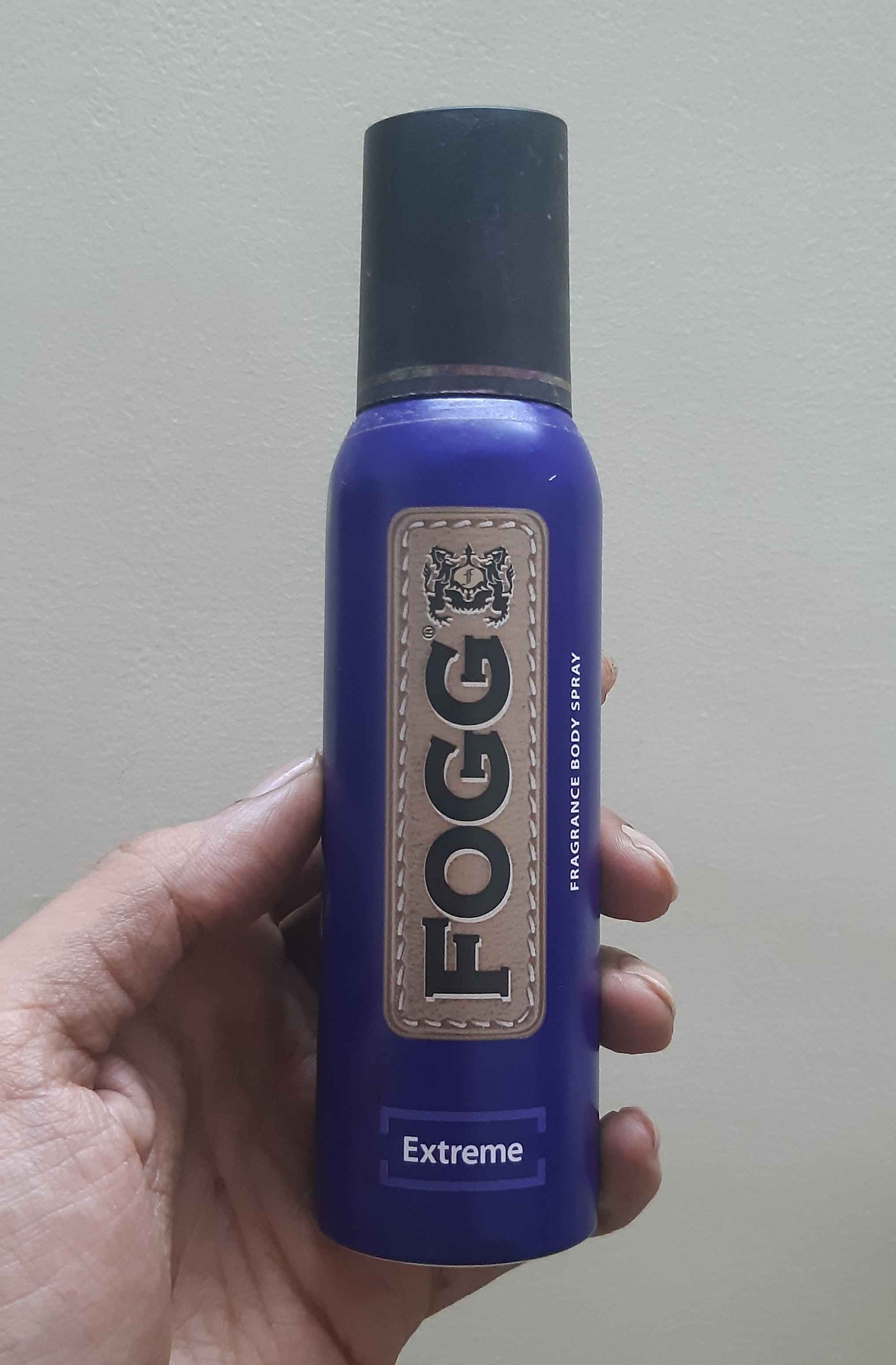
- A canister of Fogg deodorant
- Product type: Deodorant
- Produced by: Vini Cosmetics
- Country: India
- Introduced: 2011; 15 years ago
- Markets: India
- Website: viniinternational.com

Fogg is an Indian deodorant brand. It was launched in 2011 by Vini Cosmetics. It's known for its "no gas perfume spray" proposition, which it conveys through advertisements with the catchline "Kya chal raha hai? Fogg chal raha hai" (What's going on? Fogg's going on).

Fogg is often regarded as the brand that disrupted the deodorant market in India. According to Vini Cosmetics, it is currently the market leader in India's deodorant industry with 20% share.

== History ==
Fogg was launched as a deodorant brand of Vini Cosmetics in 2011 by Darshan Patel, former promoter of Paras Pharmaceuticals. In 2013, it moved past Axe to gain the largest market share of 13%. According to a report in The Times of India, this was partly attributed to its proposition of "more sprays in a bottle". Fogg claimed that its deodorant bottles would last 800 sprays.

In 2015, the brand contributed 80% to its parent's turnover of over INR 500 crore. In 2025, its market share rose to 20%.

The brand is available in 36 variants and is exported to 65 countries.

== Marketing ==
Fogg launched its first ad campaign around 2013, focusing on "no gas" proposition. According to The New Indian Express, Balaji Wafers used the "no gas" proposition for an ad.

In 2015, it launched an ad campaign with the catchline "Kya chal raha hai? Fogg chal raha hai" (What's going on? Fogg's going on). The catchline soon became synonymous with the brand. The campaign was created by Darshan Patel's adverting agency, The Womb.

== See also ==
- Axe (brand)
