= Yippee (noodles) =

Indian instant noodles brand

- Product type: Noodles
- Produced by: ITC Limited
- Country: India
- Introduced: 2010; 16 years ago
- Markets: India
- Website: sunfeastyippee.com

Yippee! is a brand of instant noodle brand manufactured and marketed by ITC Limited. It was introduced in 2010, the brand's product range includes instant noodles and pasta.

== History ==
ITC introduced Yippee! in 2010 under its Sunfeast brand as part of its packaged foods business. Yippee, had gained a 10.8% share of India's instant noodle market by the end of 2014, citing data from Euromonitor International.

In 2015, following the temporary withdrawal of Maggi noodles from the Indian market, demand for alternative instant noodle brands increased. During this period, Financial Express reported that Sunfeast Yippee was the second-largest brand in India's instant noodle market, with an estimated market share of 18–20%.

== Product ==
Sunfeast Yippee! markets a range of packaged food products, including wheat noodles, millet-based noodles, and pasta.

== See also ==
- Sunfeast
