= Smoking in Bollywood =

Bollywood, the Hindi part of the Indian film industry, is the largest film producer in India, and one of the largest film production centres in the world. Producing nearly 1000 films, selling 3.1 billion cinema tickets and grossing close to ten billion dollars a year, Bollywood exerts an extreme stronghold on the Indian culture and influences approximately 15 million people daily, who go to see Bollywood films. One such example of the influence of Bollywood culture is tobacco use. As of 2005, India had nearly 250 million tobacco users.

== Overview ==
Bollywood has a "long history of portraying heroes and villains with cigarettes or hand-rolled bidis dangling from their lips." According to a WHO study, tobacco is portrayed in 76% of Bollywood films, with cigarettes making up 72% of all the portrayals. [Even though chewing tobacco and bidis account for the majority of tobacco use in India, cigarettes do make up 20% of the market].

Prior to the 1990s, Bollywood portrayed smoking primarily as the vice of villains. The heroes portrayed in classic films were the "poor-but-proud" types. They rescued damsels in distress, performed heroic feats, and beat up gangs of bad guys single-handedly, but never did they risk their image by smoking on screen. Even the villains were classy about the tobacco use, smoking cigars in three-piece suits as they plotted their evil plans. However, the modern day heroes have brought a new tradition of "lighting up a cigarette while performing martial arts stunts." Influenced by their western counterparts in Hollywood, the heroes in Bollywood movies now have more suave, attitude, and machismo, all which appears to be complemented by the use of cigarettes. As noted by a WHO study, the occurrence of "good guys" in films smoking or using tobacco has gone up from 27% in 1991 to 53% in 2002.

== Smoking ban ==
Proposed by the Ministry of Health in May 2005, a smoking ban that prohibited films and television shows from displaying actors or actresses smoking went into effect on 2 October 2005. The Indian government felt that films were glamorising cigarettes, and with nearly 15 million people going to see Bollywood films on a daily basis, Health Minister Anubumani Ramadoss claimed that the ban would "protect the lives of millions of people who could become addicted to smoking under the influence of movies. Under the smoking ban, smoking scenes in any movie was prohibited, including any old or historical movies where, some argued, smoking was necessary to make the depiction accurate. If producers wished to show a character smoking, the scene would have to be accompanied by a note saying that smoking is injurious to health, along with disclaimers at the beginning and end of films.

During the tobacco ban, the use of tobacco was still implied in movies and television, even if it was not explicitly shown, it was "sung and danced about" instead. So Bollywood, in conjunction with tobacco companies, was still able to get around the smoking ban. Bollywood was also able to bypass the tobacco ban because of the lack of enforcement. Corruption within the government and police lead to officials not being able to successfully impose policies, such as the smoking ban in cinema. As noted by one, "The authorities aren't organized enough...I'll just pay a bribe."

The ban yet received support from the Indian public, in addition to support from some Bollywood actors and actresses. Famous actors and actresses like Vivek Oberoi and Urmila Matondkar participated in public service announcements that talked about the benefits of avoiding tobacco, such as Urmila's advertisement that said, "Every cigarette reduces life by three minutes. Isn't that scary? If you're not scared, then you are not brave, you are foolish." In addition, other actors joined the WHO campaign in India to reduce tobacco use.

However, the smoking ban was strongly opposed by some in the film industry. How can such a ban be imposed?" asked a film director, Shabana Azmi. "Films are not made in a vacuum – they are reflections of life. How can a character not be shown as smoking a cigarette if the script so demands?" Many actors, directors, and producers argued that the ban on smoking in film would be a direct impingement on their artistic freedoms, which in turn would be a violation of their democratic rights. Many in Bollywood also believed that their films didn't directly affect the public because smoking is viewed as a superficial prop, not a possible negative influence. A number of producers also argued that the government should instead focus their efforts on the nationwide public smoking ban that went into effect on 2 October 2008.

The Delhi High Court subsequently overturned the ban in January 2009, citing that the ban was a form of censorship that restricted the right to freedom of speech.

== Films ==
In India, films are a "national obsession." This obsession is translated into 800+films being produced for millions of viewers every year. As aforementioned, Bollywood captures the whims and likes of international and national arena to a greater degree. Therefore it is bound to have its influence on Indian culture as well. This popularity can sometimes have negative consequences when tobacco usage is promoted in films. It can directly influence Indian population's daily habits.

The trend of tobacco usage in the Indian film industry began in the 1950s. For Bollywood, the trend began a bit later in the 1970s. Since its introduction of tobacco in its films, Bollywood's image of tobacco has been anything but negative. Since the 1970s till now, Bollywood films have glamorised tobacco usage by ascribing certain cultural meanings and ideas to the products. The tobacco industry's or the filmmaker's implementation of tobacco in Bollywood films creates images and texts that incorporate false cultural associations and benefits. As film culture changes, the cultural meanings for tobacco use transform with it. Over time, the principle associations of tobacco in Bollywood have been the villain, the working class, healthiness, attractiveness, and independence. Listed below is a brief synopsis of a couple Bollywood films that have famous smoking scenes or songs throughout time.

- 1970/1980s
  Sholay, Coolie, Deewaar
  1990s
  Baazigar, Darr, Ghulam, Khalnayak,
  2000s
  Kaante, Devdas, Rang De Basanti, Omkara, No Smoking

In the olden films, it was more common to see a cigarette or a bidi hanging from the villain's mouth. This anti-hero was usually distinguished by partaking in alcohol or smoking, or both. The association of him as the anti-hero gives him a rebellious nature, an attractive feature to the youth. Moving forward, tobacco began to be associated with the oppressed and marginalised working class in Bollywood films. This association could speak to a majority of the Indians who were undergoing economic struggles and allude to feelings of familiarity and empowerment. In the '80s, Bollywood characters that smoked continued to be of rebellious nature. Bollywood soon began to include the romantic characters. At this point, Bollywood was beginning to vary the smokers up a bit in the film. This makes the product have a more relatable, well-rounded association. While the portrayal of smoking as rebellious has been constant, by the 90s and 2000s, there has been a decline in the incidence of smoking among the villains and sharp increase of smoking among the good guys in the Bollywood films. (From 1991 to 2002 the percentage of smoking among the good characters has risen from 22% to 53%). In the 2000s, because many of the characters who smoke are buff, handsome characters, tobacco has recently begun to be associated with images of healthiness and fashion. The more popular forms of tobacco shown from the 70s to now have been the bidi, the cigarette, and the cigar.

== Stars ==
Given Bollywood's popularity and size, "the film industry has the power to influence the behavior and attitudes of millions of people, particularly the youth." For many, Bollywood serves as a cultural reference point for what is considered fashionable, Western, and modern. Because there is such a strong relationship between youth and Bollywood, the actor's image off and on screen play a crucial role in shaping the youth's mind. The different types of characters who smoke create false images and associations of using the product for the viewers.

Actors who smoke off screen can act as a powerful reinforcement of what the youth see on screen. However, it depends highly on who the smoker is. From hundreds of actors in the film industry, the actor must be distinguishable and highly popular, almost similar to a Bollywood version of Brad Pitt or Johnny Depp. Just like Hollywood actors, Bollywood actors lead very public lives. There are magazines dedicated to their styles, their stories, and their gossip. For example, the Indian public has emulated Shah Rukh Khan, an extremely famous Bollywood actor and chain smoker, for decades. Regarding Shah Rukh Khan's on screen smoking, from a study done, the data showed that Shah Rukh Khan has the highest number of smoking incidents from 1991 to 2002. In this context, Shah Rukh Khan is the perfect target for a celebrity endorsement from tobacco industries. In an interview in 2018 Bollywood actor and director Ajay Devgn claimed to have used to smoke 100 cigarettes a day, for which he later became a subject of online trolling. This idolisation goes for any other popular Bollywood actor such as John Abraham or Sanjay Dutt. Sample quotes from a study's focus group exemplifying the intense idolisation of famous Bollywood actors:

- “It does impress people ... I am smoking SRK's (Shahrukh Khan's) cigarette brand.”
- “Sanjay Dutt in Vaastav holds the cigarette like a bidi ... we do it unconsciously ... try to copy him ... but no one really discusses it."
- "We copy everything .. their dress, hairstyle – streaks in hair, sandals, accessories, jewellery."

== Influence ==
There is a strong link between youth behaviours in India and Bollywood films. While there have been some attempts to address this issue of the influence of smoking on youth behaviour, there are some sticky obstacles that need to overcome first before advancement can be made. The main issue that can be drawn upon studies, comments, and opinions are that tobacco use is seen as a normal behaviour by a majority of the youth and public. In a study done by the WHO, the results showed that "62% of films shown were judged 'neutral'". This means that while "many of these films do have smoking incidents but they are perceived to be normal behavior.") Though many of the Bollywood movies still have high smoking incidence now, the fact that smoking is considered a "normal behavior" by the youth could be a sign that health warnings for tobacco use have not yet permeated the majority of the Indian public or that it is not yet perceived as a health priority. Bollywood filmmakers' criticisms on the idea of a smoking ban in Bollywood films also reinforce this idea. Some reactions include:

- "One would understand a ban on surrogate advertising, but to completely ban [smoking] is ridiculous, a joke taken too far" Film director Mahesh Bhatt
- "The Indian government has always thought themselves able to do whatever they feel is necessary to curtail artistic freedoms," Film director Shekhar Kapur

Rather than limiting the directors' artistic freedom, many critics believe the main problem is the government's passivity towards directly addressing the health risks of smoking. Critics suggest that the government should play more of an active role in "raising awareness among the young of the dangers of smoking or even lobby the modeling industry in an attempt to remove some of the glamour from the habit." Film director Mahesh Bhatt shares his opinion about the government's passivity and declares, "If the government has the courage, it should ban smoking in real life." These critiques raise the idea that while Bollywood plays a crucial role in youth behaviour and the prevalence of smoking, there should be more active participation in educating the health risks of tobacco to the public.

== Dangers and controversies ==
The Indian government has reason to worry about tobacco becoming a bigger health issue in upcoming years. Since the 1950s, Bollywood films have been and are still highly influential in Indian culture. With the recent overturn of the smoking ban in films, Bollywood has taken almost a backward turn in terms of addressing tobacco as a health concern for the Indian population. The main issue is that smoking in India is not yet perceived as a health issue. Even with the implementation of a public smoking ban in 2005, laws against smoking are not enforced, so tobacco use isn't seen as affecting health negatively. Images of tobacco in Bollywood reinforce this idea. Actors and actresses who now use cigarettes in their films are portrayed as young, healthy, and handsome, rather than old villainous creatures that were popular in the 1950s.

Similar to any society, children and teenagers look to emulate their idols. In India, these idols are the Bollywood stars and starlets. Their use of tobacco products is seen as "cool" and "hip," and so the Indian youth looks to mimic these habits. Thus, the Indian youth becomes a perfect target for tobacco industries to market their products to. In addition, Bollywood is seen as one of the main symbols of modernity among Indian culture. By portraying smoking and tobacco use as part of this modern and upper-class lifestyle, the public is influenced to smoke as well to achieve this elite status. By manipulating cigarettes to make them seem more than a simple product, tobacco companies are able to gain an advantage in the Indian cinema realm.

Bollywood's lack of initiative to change, along with their excessive glamorisation of cigarette use in multifarious productions, combined with the lack of public information about the hazards of tobacco use and the absence of government enforcement of policies, proves to be a perfect breeding ground for increased involvement of tobacco in Bollywood, and even more health problems from tobacco in India.

== See also ==
- Smoking in India
- Beedi
- Smoking ban
- List of smoking bans § India
- Tobacco industry
