= Stunt Silva =

Indian stunt actor, action director and stunt co-ordinator

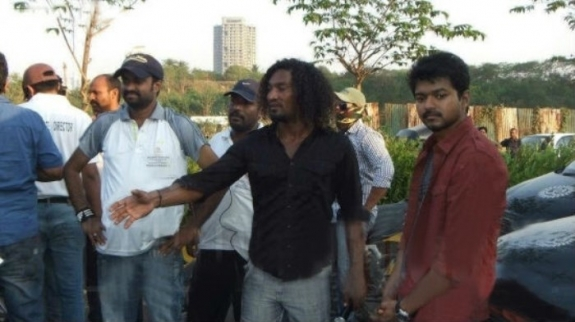
- Born: June 6, 1973 (age 53); Thoothukkudi, Tamil Nadu
- Occupations: Action Director, Actor
- Years active: 1997 – present

Stunt Silva is an Indian stunt actor, action director and stunt co-ordinator who has worked in Tamil, Telugu, Malayalam, Kannada, Nepali, Hindi films. He made his debut with the 2005 Telugu film Chatrapathi, directed by S. S. Rajamouli and has since also made appearances in films, portraying a supporting antagonist.

== Career ==
After training as a nurse at Stanley Medical College, Silva began working as a male nurse at hospitals in his home town of Tuticorin before joining Vijaya Health Centre in Chennai in 1990. He also pursued work as a peon in offices and dabbled in a transport business to keep a float financially. In 2002, he met a dance choreographer from the film industry who advised him to sign up as a background dancer in films. He took up dance lessons at Paul Raj's school but was unable to gain access into the dancers' union and instead, as a means of making any sort of money, opted to apply for membership with the union for stuntmen. Silva then began working as an assistant to stunt choreographer Peter Hein in Run (2002) and Thirumalai (2003), and choose to leave his hospital ward boy duties. During his time as an assistant, (2005) he helped Rajinikanth perform stunts in Sivaji (2007).

After serving as an assistant fighter in several Tamil and Telugu films, director S. S. Rajamouli gave Silva an opportunity to work as the stunt director of his fantasy film Yamadonga (2007), for which his work won critical acclaim. He has since gone on to work in over one hundred Indian films as the lead stunt director, working with leading directors and actors. He won recognition for his chase sequences in Mankatha (2011) and has regularly collaborated in films directed by Venkat Prabhu. In 2014, he was described by Sify.com as having achieved a "career high" through his work on prestigious film projects.

Stunt Silva has also featured in films portraying a supporting antagonist. After being seen as a henchman in Yamadonga (2007), Thalaiva (2013), Jilla (2014) and Veeram (2014), he portrayed the role of a gangster in Gautham Menon's Yennai Arindhaal (2015). He was also revealed to be a playing a leading role in the sports film, Brazil, which began production in 2014.

== Personal life ==
Stunt Silva was credited in films under his original name, Selvam, and also as Selva, before being mistakenly referred to as Silva in the credits of Vinnaithaandi Varuvaayaa (2010) by Gautham Vasudev Menon. He has subsequently chosen to adapt it as a stage name, noting that the industry's fixation with foreign stunt directors, meant that a foreign-sounding name would benefit him.

== Awards and nominations ==
Year	Nominated Movie	Language	Award	Category	Results
2011	Mankatha	Tamil	South Indian International Movie Awards — SIIMA & Vijay Television Awards	Best Action Choreography	Nominated
2012	Vettai	Tamil	Tamil Nadu State Film Awards	Tamil Nadu State Film Award for Best Stunt Coordinator	Won
2012	3	Tamil	South Indian International Movie Awards — SIIMA & Vijay Television Awards	Best Action Choreography	Nominated
2013	Vettai	Tamil	South Indian International Movie Awards — SIIMA	Best Action Choreography	Nominated
2014	Veeram	Tamil	Vijay Television Awards	Best Stunt Director	Nominated
2014	Jilla	Tamil	Vijay Television Awards	Best Stunt Director	Nominated
2014	Anjaan	Tamil	South Indian International Movie Awards — SIIMA	Best Fight Choreographer	Nominated
2015	Baji	Marathi	International Marathi Film Festival Awards — IMFFA	Best Action	Won
2015	Vedhalam	Tamil	Edison Awards	Best Action Choreography	Won
2022	Chithirai Sevvanam	Tamil	Edison Awards	Best Debut Director	Won
2025	L2: Empuraan	Malayalam	Mazhavil Entertainment Awards	Best Stunt Director	Won
2025	Thudarum	Malayalam	Mazhavil Entertainment Awards	Best Stunt Director	Won

== Filmography ==
=== Stunt director and film director ===
Year	Title	Language	Notes			
Year	Title	Language	Notes	2007	Yamadonga	Telugu
2008	Pourudu	Telugu				
2008	Yaaradi Nee Mohini	Tamil				
2008	Homam	Telugu				
2008	Hare Ram	Telugu				
2008	Souryam	Telugu				
2008	Saroja	Tamil				
2008	Arai Enn 305-il Kadavul	Tamil				
2009	Kadhalna Summa Illai	Tamil				
2009	Eeram	Tamil				
2009	Sankham	Telugu				
2009	Drona	Telugu				
2009	Rechipo	Telugu				
2010	Police Police	Telugu				
2010	Shambo Shiva Shambo	Telugu				
2010	Ye Maaya Chesave	Telugu				
2010	Kedi	Telugu				
2010	Goa	Tamil				
2010	Vinnaithaandi Varuvaayaa	Tamil				
2010	Panchakshari	Telugu				
2010	Vamsam	Tamil				
2011	Anaganaga O Dheerudu	Telugu				
2011	Nadunisi Naaygal	Tamil				
2011	Vaanam	Tamil				
2011	Venghai	Tamil				
2011	Mankatha	Tamil				
2011	Osthe	Tamil				
2011	Velayutham	Tamil				
2012	Ek Deewana Tha	Hindi				
2012	The King & the Commissioner	Malayalam				
2012	Murattu Kaalai	Tamil				
2012	3	Tamil				
2013	Naayak	Telugu				
2013	Thalaivaa	Tamil				
2013	Kanna Laddu Thinna Aasaiya	Tamil				
2013	Biriyani	Tamil				
2014	Jilla	Tamil				
2014	Veeram	Tamil				
2014	Mr. Fraud	Malayalam				
2014	RajadhiRaja	Malayalam				
2014	Bramman	Tamil				
2014	Anjaan	Tamil				
2014	Oru Oorla Rendu Raja	Tamil				
2015	Yennai Arindhaal	Tamil				
2015	Baji	Marathi				
2015	Vai Raja Vai	Tamil				
2015	Maari	Tamil				
2015	Yatchan	Tamil				
2015	Loham	Malayalam				
2015	Kaaval	Tamil				
2015	Idhu Enna Maayam	Tamil				
2015	Thani Oruvan	Tamil				
2015	Uppu Karuvaadu	Tamil				
2015	Thanga Magan	Tamil				
2015	Vedalam	Tamil				
2015	Massu Engira Masilamani	Tamil				
2016	Style	Malayalam				
2016	Oppam	Malayalam				
2016	Oozham	Malayalam				
2016	Kasaba	Malayalam				
2016	Rajini Murugan	Tamil				
2016	Chakravyuha	Kannada				
2016	Thozha	Tamil				
2016	Kodi	Tamil				
2016	Achcham Enbadhu Madamaiyada	Tamil				
2017	Kuttram 23	Tamil				
2017	Power Paandi	Tamil				
2017	Vanamagan	Tamil				
2017	Ivan Thanthiran	Tamil				
2017	Yuddham Sharanam	Telugu				
2017	Masterpiece	Malayalam				
2017	Oxygen	Telugu				
2017	Jawaan	Telugu				
2018	Street Lights	Malayalam (Note: The film was simultaneously shot in Malayalam and Tamil. However the Tamil version never saw a theatrical release.)				
2018	Kammara Sambhavam	Malayalam				
2018	Diya / Kanam	Tamil / Telugu				
2018	Parole	Malayalam				
2018	Abrahaminte Santhathikal	Malayalam				
2018	Lakshmi	Tamil				
2018	2.0	Tamil				
2018	Saamy Square	Tamil				
2018	Maari 2	Tamil				
2019	Lucifer	Malayalam				
2019	Kodathi Samaksham Balan Vakkeel	Malayalam				
2019	Oru Yamandan Premakadha	Malayalam				
2019	LKG	Tamil				
2019	Boomerang	Tamil				
2019	Watchman	Tamil				
2019	Love Action Drama	Malayalam				
2019	Aruvam	Tamil				
2019	Enai Noki Paayum Thota	Tamil				
2020	Big Brother	Malayalam				
2020	Shylock	Malayalam				
2020	Dagaalty	Tamil				
2020	Mookuthi Amman	Tamil				
2021	Master	Tamil				
2021	Tughlaq Durbar	Tamil				
2021	Thalaivii	Tamil / Hindi				
2021	MGR Magan	Tamil				
2021	Maanaadu	Tamil				
2021	Thalli Pogathey	Tamil				
2021	Chithirai Sevvanam	Tamil	Released on Zee5; Also writer and director			
2022	Maaran	Tamil				
2022	Thiruchitrambalam	Tamil				
2022	Godfather	Telugu				
2022	Monster	Malayalam				
2022	Kaapa	Malayalam				
2022	Ottu	Malayalam				
2022	Rendagam	Tamil				
2022	Malikappuram	Malayalam				
2023	Rudhran	Tamil				
2023	Chengiz	Bengali				
2024	Mission: Chapter 1	Tamil				
2024	12 Gaun	Nepali				
2024	DNA	Malayalam				
2024	Baby John	Hindi				
2025	Paranthu Po	Tamil				
2025	L2: Empuraan	Malayalam				
2025	Bazooka	Malayalam				
2025	Thudarum	Malayalam				
2025	Hari Hara Veera Mallu: Part 1	Telugu				
2025	They Call Him OG	Telugu				
2025	Diesel	Tamil				
2026	Mr. X	Tamil				
2026	Thudakkam	Malayalam				

=== As an actor ===
Year	Title	Role	Language	Notes
2002	Naya Anubhav		Hindi	Uncredited appearance
2004	7/G Rainbow Colony		Tamil / Telugu	
2005	Chatrapathi		Telugu	
2005	Anniyan	Passerby	Tamil	
2006	Ashok		Telugu	
2006	Bommarillu	Rajesh	Telugu	
2007	Yamadonga		Telugu	
2010	Kedi		Telugu	
2010	Panchakshari		Telugu	
2011	Margazhi 16		Tamil	
2011	Velayutham		Tamil	
2012	Murattu Kaalai		Tamil	
2013	Thalaivaa		Tamil	
2013	Kanna Laddu Thinna Aasaiya	Kolaveri David	Tamil	
2014	Jilla		Tamil	
2014	Veeram		Tamil	
2014	Mr. Fraud		Malayalam	
2014	Oru Oorla Rendu Raja	Hitman	Tamil	
2015	Yennai Arindhaal	Matthew	Tamil	
2015	Baji		Marathi	
2015	Yatchan		Tamil	
2015	Massu Engira Masilamani	Prince	Tamil	
2016	Style		Malayalam	
2017	Kuttram 23		Tamil	
2017	Power Paandi		Tamil	
2017	Ivan Thanthiran		Tamil	
2018	Street Lights	Murugan	Malayalam (Note: Same as a.)	
2018	Diya / Kanam		Tamil / Telugu	Uncredited role
2018	Maari 2		Tamil	
2019	Watchman		Tamil	
2019	Aruvam		Tamil	
2020	Dagaalty		Tamil	
2021	Maanaadu		Tamil	
2021	Thalli Pogathey		Tamil	Uncredited role
2022	Thiruchitrambalam		Tamil	
2023	Karungaapiyam		Tamil	
2024	12 Gaun	Drug Dealer	Nepali	
2026	Mr. X	Sampath	Tamil	Uncredited role
