= Abhinetri =

Abhinetri (lit. 'actress') may refer to:

- Abhinetri (1970 film), a 1970 Indian Hindi-language film
- Abhinetri (2015 film), an Indian Kannada-language film
- Abhinetri (2016 film) or Devi, an Indian film by A. L. Vijay
  - Abhinetri 2 or Devi 2, its 2019 sequel also by Vijay
