= Boo (2023 film) =

2023 Indian horror thriller film

- Official release poster
- Directed by: Vijay
- Written by: Vijay
- Dialogues by: Vijay; Balaji Venugopal
- Produced by: Jyoti Deshpande; Ramanjaneyulu Javvaji; M. Raja Shekhar Reddy; Anil Jain; Rakesh Jain
- Starring: Rakul Preet Singh; Vishwak Sen; Reba Monica John; Nivetha Pethuraj; Manjima Mohan; Megha Akash
- Cinematography: Sandeep K. Vijay
- Edited by: Anthony
- Music by: Songs: G. V. Prakash Kumar; Score: Madhu R
- Production companies: Sarvanth Ram Creations; Shri Shirdi Sai Movies
- Distributed by: JioCinema
- Release date: 27 May 2023
- Running time: 94 minutes
- Country: India
- Languages: Tamil; Telugu

Boo is a 2023 Indian horror thriller film written and directed by A. L. Vijay. The film stars Rakul Preet Singh, Vishwak Sen, Reba Monica John, Nivetha Pethuraj, Manjima Mohan and Megha Akash in the lead roles. It premiered on JioCinema on 27 May 2023.

== Plot ==
The story revolves around Kaira and her friends Ritika "Ritu", Aruna, and Kavya, who discover a mysterious book called Halloween Stories during their Halloween party at Kaira's house. The book includes a warning to read all the chapters without stopping, and they embark on a journey into its ghostly tales. As they delve deeper, they encounter the characters from the stories in real life. The movie explores the book's secrets and the friends' experiences in this extraordinary situation.

=== Chapter-1: Hiccups ===
Vasanthi is a journalist looking for a new single portion for rent. After a failed deal with the broker at midnight, she finds out a portion and joins immediately. Before entering the portion, the landlady asks a weird question: Does she get hiccups? Vasanthi casually says no, but sometime later, she weirdly starts getting hiccups, which eventually turn into paranormal activities around her, leading her to die in front of the landlady. The landlady puts a to-let board on the house again.

=== Chapter-2: Soul Trapper ===
Malavika just had a successful traditional date. While coming home, she accidentally kills an old man and his grandson. Terrified, she rushes home. Then she finds out their souls are following her, and finally, they get her soul trapped in the home.

=== Chapter-3: Uninvited Guest ===
Janaki "Jano" is overjoyed because her friend accepted her love proposal. Then, she unexpectedly felt the presence of paranormal activities around her. A video came to her phone showing a woman asking for help to save her and her boyfriend, who was in a haunted house. She tries to share the message with her boyfriend, but she realizes someone is watching her through her phone. Suddenly, a mysterious ghost kills her.

=== Chapter-4: Athma ===
Akash, a paranormal scientist, and his girlfriend Meera visit a haunted bungalow, where he tells the story of the place. In 1961, a Zamindar appointed four bodyguards for his daughter, who was very beautiful in the town. One day, when the Zamindar goes out of town, the bodyguards brutally raped and killed the daughter. When they are about to stage the death as a suicide, the Zamindar catches them. Then, the Zamindar severed their heads and left town. From that day onwards, there is a belief that the girl and the bodyguards' ghosts are roaming around the bungalow. Akash is excited to prove the ghosts are in the bungalow, while Meera does not believe in ghosts. She agrees to come along with Akash to prove there are no ghosts. After entering the bungalow, they experience strange incidents. Finally, the bodyguards' ghosts appear and kill Meera in front of Akash.

Some days later, the depressed Akash, with the force of his mother, talks with Vasanthi and Malavika on a traditional date for an arranged marriage. Then, it is revealed that Meera's ghost, who is always around him, became possessive and killed those girls. Later, when Akash accepts Jano's proposal, Meera kills her as well.

=== Present ===
The book's ending reveals that one of those four girls is Akash's bride, who is going to be killed by her. Then all feels tense, but Kaira suddenly reveals that it is a prank video and announces the party has ended.

The next morning, Kaira realized that her friends had been killed in an accident before coming to her house. She was actually with their ghosts throughout the night, which leaves her stunned. Some days later, Kaira gets a match through her parents. There, she recognized Akash as the groom, and tells his profession before he speak. Then the film ends with a surprised Akash, asks how do you know?

== Cast ==
- Rakul Preet Singh as Kaira
- Vishwak Sen as Akash
- Reba Monica John as Meera, Akash's girlfriend
- Nivetha Pethuraj as Vaanathi/Vasanthi (Telugu version)
- Manjima Mohan as Janaki "Jano"
- Megha Akash as Malavika
- Vidyullekha Raman as Ritika "Ritu", Kaira's friend
- Prudhvi Raj as a cop, later Kaira's man servant
- Ayraa as Aruna, Kaira's friend
- Gurpreet as Kavya, Kaira's friend
- Preetham as House owner, later Kaira's maid

== Production ==
The production on the film developed under the title of October 31st Ladies Night in 2021. In 2023, it was acquired by Jio Studios and was retitled Boo. The tagline of the film is "The next time you get a hiccup, don't look for water, look around, it could be a ghost." The film was produced by Jyoti Deshpande, Ramanjaneyulu Javvaji, and M. Raja Shekhar Reddy under the banners of Sarvanth Ram Creations and Shri Shirdi Sai Movies, while it was co-produced by Anil Jain and Rakesh Jain. The cinematography was done by Sandeep K. Vijay, and Anthony handled the editing. It has action sequences choreographed by Stunt Silva. The film was shot during the second wave of COVID-19.

== Music ==
Boo

Soundtrack album by G. V. Prakash Kumar
- Released: 2023
- Genre: Feature film soundtrack
- Length: 3:20
- Languages: Tamil; Telugu
- Label: Junglee Music
- Producer: G. V. Prakash Kumar

G. V. Prakash Kumar chronology
Modern Love Chennai (2023)	Boo (2023)	Kathar Basha Endra Muthuramalingam (2023)

Tamil
- Halloween from "Boo" - Tamil Song on YouTube

Telugu
- Halloween from "Boo" - Telugu Song on YouTube

The film's music was composed by G. V. Prakash Kumar, while the background score was by Madhu R. This film is the eleventh collaboration between the music composer G. V. Prakash Kumar and the filmmaker A. L. Vijay.

Tamil
No.	Title	Lyrics	Singer(s)	Length
1.	"Halloween"	Madhan Karky	Shireen Shahana	3:20
Total length:				3:20

Telugu
No.	Title	Lyrics	Singer(s)	Length
1.	"Halloween"	Ramajogayya Sastry	Harika Narayan	3:20
Total length:				3:20

== Release ==
The film was released on JioCinema on 27 May 2023, with free streaming and a dubbed version in Hindi.

== Reception ==
Navein Darshan of Cinema Express gave it 1 out of 5 stars and wrote, "Though the film has a couple of capable performers, the film refuses to rise above mediocrity thanks to its lackadaisical writing and amateur execution."

Paul Nicodemus of The Times of India gave it 2 out of 5 stars and wrote, "If you're looking for a good scare, it is not the film for you. But if you're in the mood for a spooky movie to watch with friends, go for it."
