= Boogie Man (2018 film) =

- Theatrical release poster
- Directed by: Andy Morahan
- Screenplay by: Andy Morahan; Simon Olivier
- Produced by: Paul G. Andrews; Scott Millaney
- Starring: Kush Khanna; Amy Jackson; Aston Merrygold; Jerry-Jane Pears
- Music by: Rishi Rich
- Release date: 24 March 2018 (UK Asian Film Festival)
- Running time: 100 minutes
- Country: United Kingdom
- Language: English

Boogie Man is a 2018 British romantic comedy film directed by Andy Morahan and starring Kush Khanna, Amy Jackson, Aston Merrygold and Jerry-Jane Pears.

Shot in London and India, the film premiered at the Cannes Film Festival in spring 2018 and went on to screen at multiple others, garnering awards from the UK Asian Film Festival and Calcutta International Cult Films Festival.

== Synopsis ==
Feeling adrift, British-Indian teenager Pavan is unsure how to come to terms with his present and future life. His grandfather and mother want him to become the first person in their family to attend and graduate from college, however Pavan is unsure if this is really what he wants. His friends seem far more self assured, making Pavan feel somewhat isolated. His love for 70s disco music gives him solace, particularly as it allows him to feel closer to his dead father, who also loved disco. As a way of escaping familial and cultural pressure, Pavan occasionally imagines himself as the hero in an idealized 70s landscape set to a disco soundtrack.

When he has the chance to attend a disco themed party Pavan jumps at the chance, where he has a brief meeting with Stephanie, a 20-something model and actress. Pavan falls instantly in love with her, despite spending little time together, and becomes determined to win her heart.

== Cast ==
- Kush Khanna as Pavan
- Amy Jackson as Nimisha
- Aston Merrygold as Danny
- Jerry-Jane Pears as Stephanie Crane
- Roshan Seth as Pavan's grandfather
- Shobu Kapoor as Pavan's mother
- Karan Gill as Rama
- Simone Ashley as Aarti
- Nicholas Prasad as Sunil
- Ramon Tikaram as Deepak

== Production ==
The film began production in February 2017. The film was shot in London and India. The film was launched at the Cannes Film Festival.

== Reception ==
Reviewing the film at the UK Asian Film Festival, a critic from Desiblitz wrote that "Boogie Man is a fun mix of Seventies music and Bollywood emotion" and added that the film was a "feel-good comedy". A critic from the CKF International Film Festival wrote that the film was "A good watch in today’s challenging quarantine time to uplift your spirit".

== Accolades ==
Award	Date of ceremony	Category	Recipient(s)	Result	Ref.
UK Asian Film Festival	March 2018	Best Soundtrack	Rishi Rich	Won	
Calcutta International Cult Films Festival	February 2020	Best Producer	Paul G. Andrews, Scott Millaney	Won	
Calcutta International Cult Films Festival	February 2020	Debut Filmmaker — Outstanding Achievement Award	Andy Morahan	Won (Note: This award was also won by the films Agent 11 and Tigahdoo.)	
Calcutta International Cult Films Festival	February 2020	Narrative Features — Outstanding Achievement Award	Andy Morahan	Won (Note: This award was also won by the films The Sanctuary and The Next Hearing.)	
