= A. L. Azhagappan =

Indian actor and film producer (born 1951)

- Born: 18 September 1951 (age 75)
- Occupations: Actor, Film producer
- Years active: 1998-Present
- Spouse: Valliammai
- Children: A. L. Vijay, Udhaya

A. L. Azhagappan (born 18 September 1951) is an Indian actor and film producer in Tamil cinema. After making films he has made a career appearing in supporting roles as an actor. His sons A. L. Vijay and Udhaya also work in the film industry.

== Career ==
He was appointed President of Tamil Nadu Producers Council in 2004, and controversially threatened to sue television network Sun TV for showing clips of films. Azhagappan's work was halted in June 2006, when he was arrested in a cheating case for failing to return money to the financier, Vishal Jain, for a film that never began production. The arrest was considered highly political as a result of Azhagappan's declining relationship with the then political supremo, Karunanidhi.

Since 2010, Azhagappan has also worked in film as a supporting actor, notably winning award nominations for his negative role in M. Sasikumar's Easan (2010).

== Filmography ==
=== As actor ===
Year	Film	Role	Notes
2010	Easan	Deivanayagam	Nominated, Vijay Award for Best Villain
2014	Kathai Thiraikathai Vasanam Iyakkam		Guest appearance
2014	Nerungi Vaa Muthamidathe	Kaleeshwaran	
2017	Thiri	Anganan	
2021	Paramapadham Vilayattu	Kalingan	
2023	Thunivu	Chief Minister	
2024	Mazhai Pidikkatha Manithan	Minister Thavapunniyam	
2026	Jana Nayagan	Chief Minister	

=== As producer ===
- Ini Ellam Sugame (1998)
- Kalakalappu (2001)
- Saivam (2014)
- Idhu Enna Maayam (2015)
- Oru Naal Iravil (2016)
- Sometimes (2017)
- Vanamagan (2017)
- Chithirai Sevvaanam (2021)
