= A. L. Vijay =

Indian film director and screenwriter (born 1979)

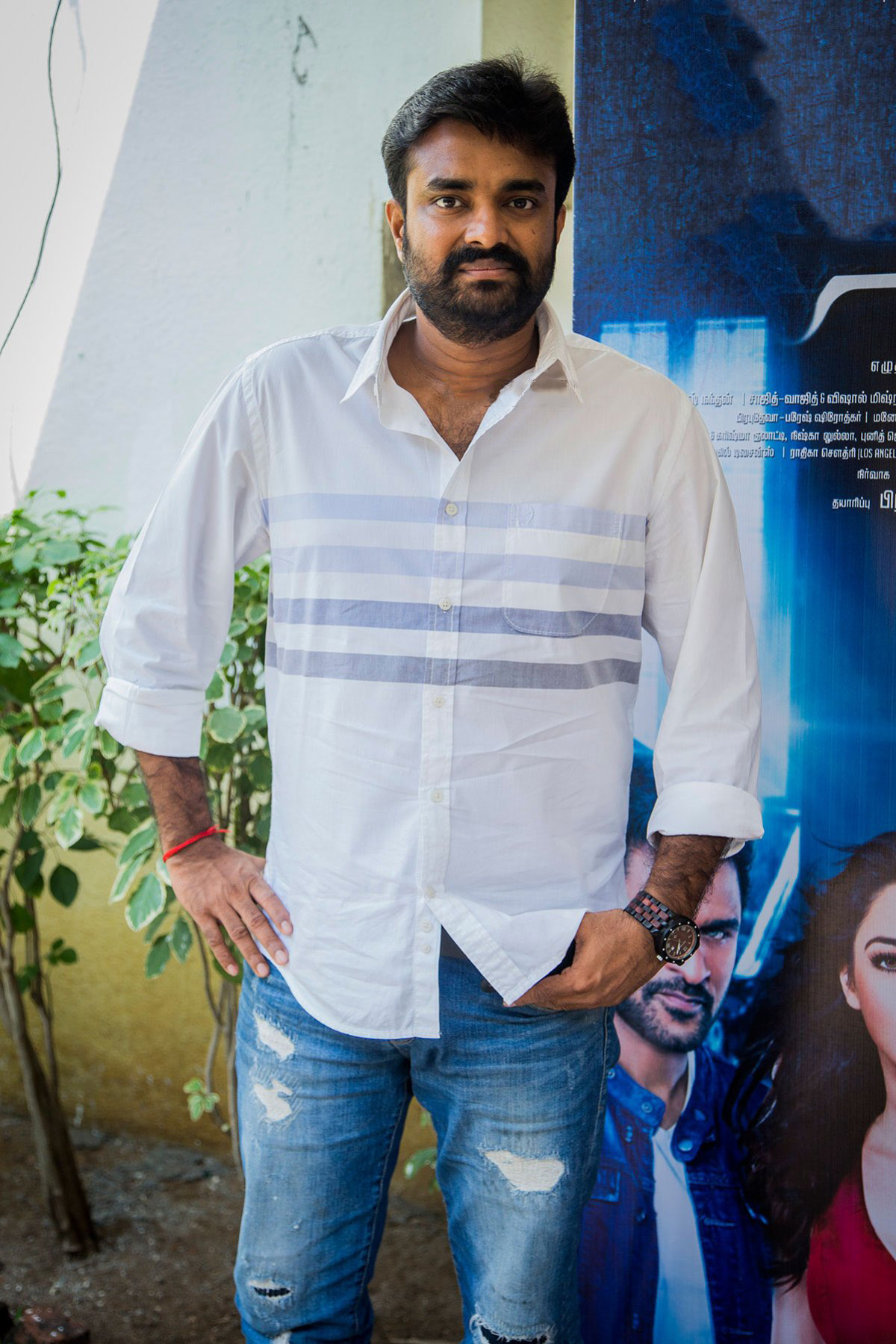
- Vijay promoting Devi in 2016
- Born: 18 June 1979 (age 47); Chennai, India
- Occupation: Film director Screenwriter
- Years active: 2000–Present
- Spouses: Amala Paul (m. 2014; div. 2017) R. Aishwarya (m. 2019)
- Children: 1
- Parent: A. L. Azhagappan (father)
- Relatives: Udhaya (brother)

A. L. Vijay (18 June 1979), known professionally as Vijay, is an Indian film director and screenwriter who works in the Tamil film industry. An assistant director with Priyadarshan, he debuted as director through the film Kireedam (2007) and gained popularity through the films Madrasapattinam (2010) and Deiva Thirumagal (2011).

== Background ==
Vijay was born into a film family. His father, A. L. Azhagappan, is a noted film producer and a former President of the Tamil Nadu Producers Council. Azhagappan has also appeared as character artist in some films, including the film Eesan. Vijay's brother is the actor Udhaya.

== Personal life ==
Vijay was briefly married to actress Amala Paul between 2014 and 2016–17. While Vijay belongs to a Tamil-speaking Hindu family, Amala comes from a Malayali Christian family. They got engaged on 7 June 2014 at a Church in Aluva, Kerala, using a ring for the ceremony, and were married in a "traditional south Indian style wedding," presumably Hindu, on 12 June 2014 in Chennai. They separated in July 2016 and were granted a divorce by the courts in February 2017.

In July 2019, in a private family ceremony, Vijay married Dr. R. Aishwarya, a match arranged by their families. On 30 May 2020, the couple had their first child, a baby boy.

== Career ==
=== 2000–2008: Early Career ===
Prior to directing films, Vijay was a successful advertisement filmmaker with the Mumbai-based banner Venus Productions, completing more than 100 ad films. His State Bank of India commercial won CNBC's Best Corporate Advertisement Award. Vijay has claimed that "advertisements teach you how to translate a story idea onto screen with maximum impact in minimum time" and is influenced by the ad works of Suraaj, Prahlad Kakkar and Babu Shankar. He began his career in feature films by joining Priyadarshan as an assistant director in his films.

He made his directorial debut with Kireedam in 2007, a remake of the 1989 film of the same name, directed by Sibi Malayil and written by A. K. Lohithadas. Vijay's version featured Ajith Kumar in the lead role with Trisha Krishnan, Rajkiran, Saranya and Vivek also as part of the cast, while the cinematographer was Tirru, the music was composed by G. V. Prakash Kumar and the film was edited by Anthony. Vijay revealed that he "reworked about 80 per cent" from the original version and his first choice of male lead role was Vijay, however his role was grabbed by Ajith for his career security. The film opened to positive reviews with a critic from Sify.com citing that Vijay had "a lot of guts and conviction to make a realistic film". The reviewer from The Hindu also praised the film labelling that "Vijay has neatly packaged a strong story line with a sensibly balanced mix of sentiment and action.", but claimed that "Vijay could have worked on the lead character more." The final scene in the film was changed after release from a sad to an upbeat ending after the producers felt that the original scene may keep audiences away. The film consequently went on to become a profitable venture at the box office. Vijay then returned to work as an assistant to Suraj in his action-masala Padikathavan, by helping with the dialogues and described his work in the project as "a pulsating experience". Vijay's next remake of the Hindi film Khosla Ka Ghosla in Tamil, under his production house, and hence they collaborated to make Poi Solla Porom. The film was completed within 13 days, with a cast containing veteran actors such as Nassar and Nedumudi Venu as well as relative newcomers including Karthik Kumar and Piaa Bajpai. The film also became one of the first ventures in Tamil cinema to feature a promotional song, with Vijay maintaining that the song reflected the story of the film. The film won positive reviews from critics with The Hindu citing that "Vijay's dialogue, both humorous and thought-provoking, tickles the viewer almost throughout" and that "Vijay has understood the pulse of the audience even while sticking to his stand of providing standard fare".

=== 2010–2015: Critical Acclaim ===
Vijay revealed that Madrasapattinam (2010) was supposed to happen later in his career, but the intervention of producer Kalpathi S. Aghoram of AGS Entertainment realized the viability of the film earlier. Vijay had first explored the script in his college days and drew inspiration from an English professor, who used to talk to them about the freedom movement a lot. Vijay visualized the people, who lived in the pre-independence period of India and explored the concept of how it would have been, if an English girl fell in love with an Indian boy, laying the foundations for the script. The script took six months to write with the help of leading Tamil writer Prabanjan. He also visited independence veterans to understand the history of the city of Madras between 1945 and 1947. Arya was finalised to play the lead role and English Miss Teen World winner Amy Jackson was selected after Vijay found a picture of her through the internet. Despite being a period film, the film was finished in eight months and released in July 2010. The production of the film, Deiva Thirumagal (2011) took five months from start to finish, however, Vijay claimed that the film had been in his plans for four years, but he waited for Vikram to give him dates. Amala Paul was selected after Vijay was pleased with her award-winning work in Mynaa. Sara had appeared in a commercial for Vijay when she was two, but he then lost touch with Sara's family, before he met them and cast Sara in Deiva Thirumagal, following a visit to Mumbai. Vijay directed the Harris: On The Edge concerts by music composer Harris Jayaraj. In 2013, he worked with C. Joseph Vijay alongside Amala Paul for the movie Thalaivaa. Despite winning good reviews, the film's delayed release in Tamil Nadu due to protests greatly affected the box office performance in Tamil Nadu, thus ending up as an average grosser. After working with top stars Ajith, Vijay and Vikram in his previous films, Vijay has decided to go with lesser known faces in Saivam (2014). Veteran actor Nassar and Sara Arjun of Deiva Thirumagal fame play the lead roles. Director Vijay very subtly tries to put across his message of promoting animal welfare and encouraging vegetarianism in the film. His next project is the romantic comedy film, Idhu Enna Maayam (2015).

=== 2016–present ===
In February 2016, he was named as a director of Prabhu Deva's trilingual film Devi opposite Tamannaah which was made in Tamil, Telugu and Hindi. This marked his debut in Telugu and Hindi languages. He reunites again with Prabhu Deva in the films Lakshmi (2018) and Devi 2 (2019), simultaneously shot in Telugu as Abhinetri 2.

In 2021, he directed a biographical drama film Thalaivii based on the life of Indian actress-turned chief minister J. Jayalalithaa. The film starred Kangana Ranaut as the main protagonist Jayalalithaa and Arvind Swami as M. G. Ramachandran. The bilingual film was shot in Tamil and Hindi simultaneously. He directed a horror thriller film, Boo (2023), after the rather forgettable Diya. In 2024, the action thriller film Mission: Chapter 1 starring Arun Vijay and Amy Jackson in lead roles was released. The next direction was Kadhal Reset Repeat (2026), which was a failure.

== Craft, style, and technical collaborations ==
Vijay has described that he wants his audience "to immerse themselves" in his films, and hence uses scenes which reflect the local culture, explaining that his scenes should mirror society and "lend it an element of timelessness". He revealed that while constructing a film, he "first thinks of the plot, then the screenplay and then the characters", and tries to portray human values in his films.

He has expressed that he prefers "to mould actors," telling them to react and not act, drawing such inspiration from the work of Suraaj.

Furthermore, Vijay has shown interest in training people and mentoring their careers, citing that he likes to be the oldest member of his crew. His films have a "regular crew" which includes cinematographer Nirav Shah, music director G. V. Prakash Kumar (being his regular music composer until Devi), production designer Selva Kumar, and editor Anthony.

=== Frequent collaborators ===
Collaborator	Kireedam; (2007)	Poi Solla Porom; (2008)	Madrasapattinam; (2010)	Deiva Thirumagal; (2011)	Thaandavam; (2012)	Thalaivaa; (2013)	Saivam; (2014)	Idhu Enna Maayam; (2015)	Devi / Abhinetri / Tutak Tutak Tutiya; (2016)	Vanamagan; (2017)	Diya / Kanam; (2018)	Lakshmi; (2018)	Watchman; (2019)	Devi 2 / Abhinetri 2; (2019)	Thalaivii; (2021)	Boo; (2023)	Mission: Chapter 1; (2024)	Kadhal Reset Repeat; (2026)
G. V. Prakash Kumar	Yes		Yes	Yes	Yes	Yes	Yes	Yes					Yes (also acted)	Yes	Yes	Yes		
Anthony	Yes	Yes	Yes	Yes	Yes	Yes	Yes	Yes	Yes	Yes	Yes	Yes	Yes	Yes		Yes	Yes	Yes
Nirav Shah	Yes		Yes	Yes	Yes	Yes	Yes	Yes			Yes	Yes	Yes					
Nassar		Yes	Yes	Yes	Yes	Yes	Yes	Yes	Yes (Devi and Tutak Tutak Tutiya)						Yes			
George Maryan		Yes	Yes	Yes			Yes				Yes							
Raj Arjun					Yes	Yes			Yes				Yes		Yes			
Amy Jackson			Yes		Yes				Yes (cameo)								Yes	
Santhanam	Yes			Yes	Yes	Yes												
RJ Balaji								Yes	Yes		Yes (Diya)			Yes (Devi 2)				
M. S. Bhaskar	Yes		Yes	Yes	Yes													Yes
Balaji Venugopal		Yes	Yes		Yes			Yes								Yes (dialogues)		
Ajayan Bala											Yes	Yes		Yes	Yes			
Jayakumar	Yes		Yes								Yes				Yes			
Sathya									Yes		Yes (Kanam)	Yes		Yes				

== Filmography ==
Key
†	Denotes films that have not yet been released

=== As film director ===
- Note: he also worked as a screenwriter for all his films, except where noted.

Year	Film	Language	Notes
2007	Kireedam	Tamil	
2008	Poi Solla Porom	Tamil	
2010	Madrasapattinam	Tamil	Nominated, Filmfare Award for Best Director – Tamil Nominated, Vijay Award for Best Director
2011	Deiva Thirumagal	Tamil	Tamil Nadu State Film Award for Best Director Tamil Nadu State Film Award for Best Film (Second prize); Nominated, Filmfare Award for Best Director – Tamil
2012	Thaandavam	Tamil	
2013	Thalaivaa	Tamil	
2014	Saivam	Tamil	
2015	Idhu Enna Maayam	Tamil	
2016	Devi	Tamil	Trilingual film
2016	Abhinetri	Telugu	Trilingual film
2016	Tutak Tutak Tutiya	Hindi	Trilingual film
2017	Vanamagan	Tamil	
2018	Diya	Tamil	
2018	Kanam	Telugu	
2018	Lakshmi	Tamil	partially reshot in Telugu
2019	Watchman	Tamil	
2019	Devi 2	Tamil	Bilingual film
2019	Abhinetri 2	Telugu	Bilingual film
2021	Kutty Story	Tamil	Segment: Avanum Naanum
2021	Thalaivii	Hindi	Bilingual film; based on the novel by Ajayan Bala
2021	Thalaivii	Tamil	Bilingual film; based on the novel by Ajayan Bala
2023	Boo	Tamil	Bilingual film
2023	Boo	Telugu	Bilingual film
2024	Mission: Chapter 1	Tamil	
2026	Kadhal Reset Repeat	Tamil	
2027	Gladiators - In Pursuit of Challenges	Tamil	Announced

=== As writer and producer ===
Year	Title	Credited as		Language	Notes
Year	Title	Writer	Producer	Language	Notes
2015	Oru Naal Iravil	No	Presenter	Tamil	
2017	Vanamagan	Yes	Yes	Tamil	
2018	Sila Samayangalil	Dialogues	No	Tamil	
2021	Chithirai Sevvanam	Story	Presenter	Tamil	
2026	Kadhal Reset Repeat	Yes	Yes	Tamil	

=== Television ===
Year	Title	Credited as		Language	Network
Year	Title	Creator	Director	Language	Network
2021	Five Six Seven Eight	Yes	Yes	Tamil	Zee5
