= Amy Jackson =

English actress and model (born 1992)

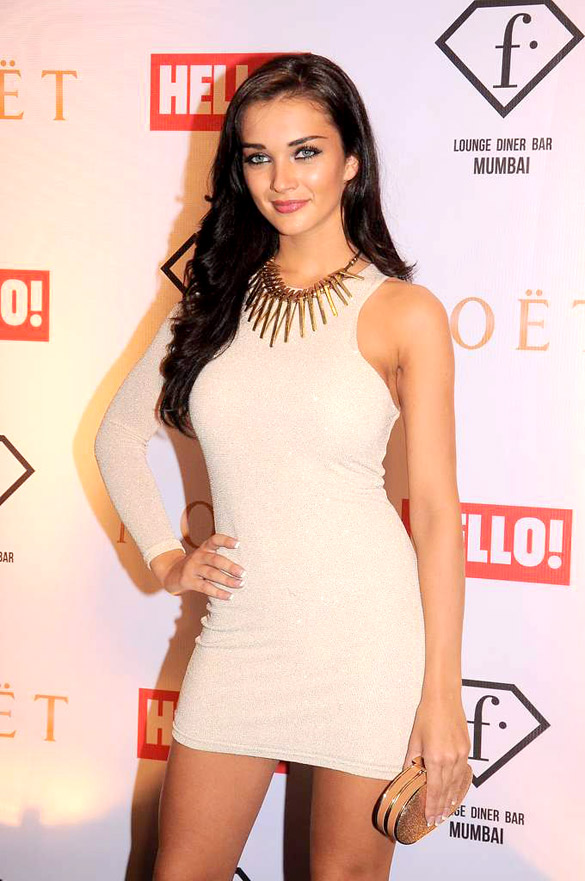
- Jackson in 2012
- Born: Amy Louise Jackson; 31 January 1992 (age 34); Douglas, Isle of Man
- Other name: Amy Jackson Westwick
- Occupations: Actress; model
- Years active: 2006–present
- Spouse: Ed Westwick (m. 2024)
- Children: 2

Amy Louise Jackson Westwick (née Jackson; born 31 January 1992) is a British actress and model known for her work in Indian films. She predominantly works in Tamil films in addition to few Hindi, Telugu, Kannada and English films. Jackson's most notable roles include Amy Wilkinson in Madrasapattinam (2010), Sarah in Singh Is Bliing (2015), Annie in Theri (2016), and Nila in 2.0 (2018). She has won an Ananda Vikatan Cinema Award, a SIIMA Award, and a London Asian Film Festival award.

In 2007, at the age of 14, Jackson began her modeling career in the UK and has since worked with designers such as Hugo Boss, Carolina Herrera, JW Anderson, Bulgari, and Cartier. In 2009, she was crowned Miss Teen World. She was called to London to audition for the lead role in the Tamil film Madrasapattinam (2010), winning the role despite having had no previous acting experience and beginning her career in India. She made her Hindi debut in Ekk Deewana Tha (2012), and Telugu debut in Yevadu (2014). She was featured on The Times of India's "Most Promising Female Newcomers of 2012" and "Most Desirable Women of 2014" lists. She made her American debut as Imra Ardeen / Saturn Girl in the television series Supergirl (2017), and her British debut as Nimisha in Boogie Man (2018).

Jackson is a patron for charities such as the Sneha Sargar Orphanage for Girls. In 2018, she was honoured with the United Nations' International Day of the Girl Child Award. She is a vegan and an animal rights advocate who has been an ambassador for PETA since 2016, as well as supporting Elephant Family with their mission to reduce human-animal conflict in Asia.

== Early life ==
Amy Louise Jackson was born in Douglas, Isle of Man on 31 January 1992, the daughter of Liverpool natives Marguerita and Alan Jackson. She has an older sister named Alicia, who is a teacher. Jackson was raised as a Christian. When Jackson was two years old, the family returned to Liverpool and lived with her grandmother in the suburb of Woolton so that her father could continue his career with BBC Radio Merseyside. Her parents later divorced. She attended St Edward's College in the suburb of West Derby and intended to take her A-Levels in English literature, philosophy, and ethics before she was cast in her first film.

== Career ==
=== Modelling ===
After winning the Miss Teen Liverpool and Miss Teen Great Britain pageants, Jackson won the title of Miss Teen World in 2009. In 2009, Jackson started her modelling career with the Northern-based modelling agency, Boss Model Management, and then went on to sign with her London agency, Models 1. She won Miss Liverpool in 2010. She competed for the Miss England title in 2010 and was crowned the runner-up to Jessica Linley.

=== 2010–2012: Breakthrough in Indian films ===
In 2010, Indian film producers spotted Jackson's photo on the Miss Teen World website and invited her to audition for the Tamil period-drama film Madrasapattinam (2010). Despite having had no previous acting experience, she was cast as the female lead opposite Arya. The film, set against the backdrop of Pre-Independence India, tells the story of a British Governor's daughter who falls in love with a village boy. Jackson admitted that it was very difficult to learn the Tamil dialogues. The film was released on 9 July 2010; it was praised by critics and performed well at the box office, with Jackson gaining praise for her performance. Sify wrote, "It is an out and out Amy Jackson show. She is simply amazing to deliver lines in Tamil, and is one good reason to see the film". Behindwoods wrote, "The one who walks away with the top honours is Amy Jackson for a beautiful portrayal of a lady torn between her love and the mighty empire. She looks absolutely beautiful, emotes well through her expressive eyes and is able to earn the sympathy of the audiences during tough times". Rediff wrote, "Amy Jackson is almost perfect as the wide-eyed young girl who is seeing India for the first time, fascinated by its culture".

In 2011, she was signed by Gautham Vasudev Menon to play the female lead opposite Prateik Babbar in Ekk Deewana Tha (2012), the Hindi remake of the 2010 hit romantic drama film Vinnaithaandi Varuvaayaa. She essayed the role played by Trisha in the original, of Jessie, a Malayali Nasrani Christian who falls in love with a Hindu boy, but is prevented from pursuing the romance by her father. The film was released in February 2012. Jackson received praise for her performance and for her chemistry with Babbar, with BehindWoods stating that "she has done wonders," and the Times of India saying that "she never disappoints."

In September 2012, Jackson made her return to Tamil cinema with a supporting role in Thaandavam (2012), starring opposite Vikram and Anushka Shetty. She was signed for the film in 2011 and shooting took place in India and London, enabling Jackson to return to see her family and friends. It was her second collaboration with director A. L. Vijay after Madrasapattinam (2010). She played the role of Sarah Vinayagam, a British-born Anglo-Indian girl who wins the Miss London title. She received her first nomination for the Filmfare Award for Best Supporting Actress – Tamil at the 60th Filmfare Awards South ceremony.

=== 2014–present: Recent work ===
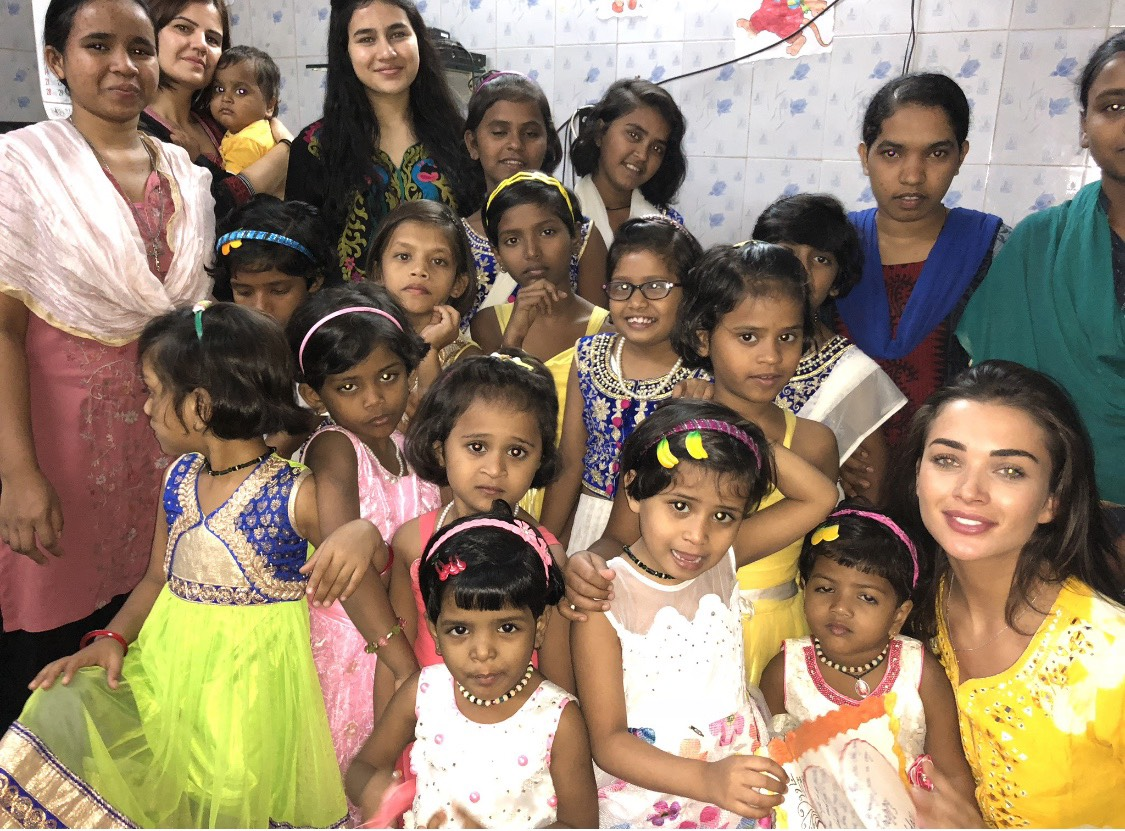
Jackson at Mumbai's Sneha Sagar Orphanage in March 2016

Jackson made her debut in Telugu cinema with the Vamshi Paidipally's Yevadu (2014) alongside Ram Charan and Shruti Haasan, playing the role of Shruti. Jackson next starred as supermodel Diya in Shankar's romantic thriller film, whose title is simply I (2015), the biggest project in her career. The making of the film, one of the most costly Indian films to date, took over two-and-a-half years, with a major part of the film being shot in China. The film was released on 14 January 2015 and received a mixed critical response, although Jackson's performance received favorable reviews. Deccan Chronicle wrote that she was "simply superb. She is another highlight of the film and has given a mature performance", while Sify noted that she was "the biggest surprise packet in the film" and "perfect eye candy". Consequently, she was ranked #1 in The Times of India, Chennai Edition list of the most desirable women in 2014.

After I (2015), Jackson signed on to Prabhu Deva's Singh Is Bliing (2015), opposite Akshay Kumar. She had signed on to be part of Venkat Prabhu's supernatural thriller Masss (2015), but opted out of it later when the script and her character were changed. Instead, she signed on to Velraj's Thanga Magan (2015) alongside Dhanush and Samantha Ruth Prabhu.

Soon after, Jackson starred in Thirukumaran's Gethu (2016), portraying an Anglo-Indian girl, for which she won positive reviews. She has been shooting for a "gritty BBC drama series", on which she declined to further elaborate. She then portrayed the lead female role in Atlee's Theri (2016), featured alongside Vijay while portraying a Malayali teacher. Her performance received positive reviews and her role as a teacher was well appreciated. Upon release, the film went on to become one of the most profitable Tamil films of all time.

On 25 September 2017, it was announced that Jackson had been cast in her first Hollywood role as Imra Ardeen, aka Saturn Girl, in The CW's superhero drama series Supergirl (2017). The character made her first appearance in the third season. The series, based on DC characters created by Jerry Siegel and Joe Shuster, is produced by Berlanti Productions in association with Warner Bros Television.

Jackson has played Sita in Prem's Kannada film The Villain (2018) alongside Shiva Rajkumar and Sudeep. She starred as the andro-humanoid robot Nila in Shankar's film 2.0 (2018) alongside Rajinikanth and Akshay Kumar. After a five-year hiatus, Jackson returned to film with Mission: Chapter 1.

== Personal life ==
Jackson is a practicing Christian. In 2017, Jackson spoke about her observance of the Western Christian liturgical season of Lent on its first day, Ash Wednesday.

In 2011, during the filming of Ekk Deewana Tha (2012), Jackson began a relationship with Prateik Babbar, an Indian actor. They broke up in 2012.

Jackson lived in Mumbai from 2011 to 2015, then relocated to London. She began dating hotelier George Panayiotou, the son of English-Cypriot businessman Andreas Panayiotou, in December 2015. They became engaged in Zambia on 1 January 2019. Their son was born on 19 September 2019. The couple later broke up at an unknown date in 2021. Jackson began dating English actor Ed Westwick in 2022. On January 29, 2024, they announced that they had gotten engaged in Gstaad, and got married in August of that year in Rocca Cilento, Campania. She later changed her name to Amy Jackson Westwick. On October 31 of the same year, Jackson announced she was pregnant with her second child and first with Westwick. On March 24, 2025, they revealed that their son, Oscar Alexander, had been born.

== Media image and more ==
Jackson is a regular attendee at BAFTA, Cannes Film Festival, British Fashion Awards and International Fashion Weeks. In 2017 she was chosen as the muse for L'Agence at The Green Carpet Fashion Awards during Milan Fashion Week. She has been featured in editorials for fashion magazines like Vogue, Marie Clare, Cosmopolitan, ELLE.

Jackson is an ambassador and spokesperson for charities such as Being Human, Cash and Rocket, St. Jude's Hospital in Mumbai, and the Girl Child education program in India. In 2014, she posed with her rescue cat in a PETA campaign promoting the adoption of animals from shelters.

== Filmography ==
Film
Year	Title	Role(s)	Language(s)	Notes	Ref.
2010	Madrasapattinam	Amy Wilkinson / Duraiammal	Tamil		
2012	Thaandavam	Sara Vinayagam Pillai	Tamil		
2012	Ekk Deewana Tha	Jessie Thekekuthu	Hindi		
2014	Yevadu	Shruthi	Telugu		
2015	I	Diya	Tamil		
2015	Singh Is Bliing	Sara Rana	Hindi		
2015	Thanga Magan	Hema D'Souza	Tamil		
2016	Gethu	Nandhini Ramanujan	Tamil		
2016	Theri	Annie	Tamil		
2016	Devi	Jennifer	Tamil	Special appearance in the song, "Chal Maar"	
2016	Freaky Ali	Megha	Hindi		
2018	Boogie Man	Nimisha	English		
2018	The Villain	Sita	Kannada		
2018	2.0	Nila	Tamil		
2024	Mission: Chapter 1	Sandra James	Tamil		
2024	Crakk	Patricia Novak	Hindi		

Television
Year	Title	Role	Notes
2017–2018	Supergirl	Imra Ardeen	Recurring role (season 3, 9 episodes)

== Awards and nominations ==
- 2013: The Times of India's Most Desirable Women of 2012 #22
- 2013: The Times of India's Most Promising Female Newcomer 2012: #7 (for Ekk Deewana Tha)
