= Kadhal Reset Repeat =

2026 Indian Tamil-language film by A. L. Vijay

- Theatrical release poster
- Directed by: Vijay
- Screenplay by: A. Mahadev
- Story by: A. Mahadev; Vijay
- Produced by: Vijay; Sunny Denvi; Prabha Premkumar
- Starring: Madumkesh; Jiya Shankar
- Cinematography: Arvind Krishna
- Edited by: Anthony
- Music by: Harris Jayaraj
- Production companies: D Studios; Denvi Productions; Maali and Manvi Movie Makers
- Distributed by: Romeo Pictures
- Release date: 6 March 2026
- Running time: 133 minutes
- Country: India
- Language: Tamil

Kadhal Reset Repeat (transl. Love Reset Repeat) is a 2026 Indian Tamil-language psychological romantic musical comedy film written, directed and co-produced by Vijay under D Studios, in association with Denvi Productions and Maali and Manvi Movie Makers. The film stars Madumkesh and Jiya Shankar, with Malayalam actor Arjun Ashokan (in his Tamil debut), M. S. Bhaskar, Jayaprakash and Viji Chandrasekhar in supporting roles.

The film was officially announced in October 2025. The music was composed by Harris Jayaraj, cinematography handled by Arvind Krishna and editing by Anthony. Kadhal Reset Repeat was released in theatres on 6 March 2026 and was not a box office success.

== Plot ==
Aditi is a singer whose wealthy parents want her married off. Since she is musically inclined, her boyfriend Hari suggests she fly to Scotland for a band competition instead. Meanwhile, Siddharth, who has silently watched Aditi since childhood when his mother taught her piano, drops her at the airport wearing a helmet so she will not recognize him, then impulsively follows her onto the same flight. In Scotland, Aditi discovers her boyfriend plans to ditch her, wanders to a cliff edge and jumps. Siddharth, who had been trailing her at a distance the entire time, jumps after her to save her by also falling off the cliff. Aditi lands on a camper's tent, sustains a head injury, and wakes up with no memory.

== Cast ==
- Madumkesh as Siddharth
- Jiya Shankar as Aditi
- Arjun Ashokan as Arri
- M. S. Bhaskar as Paal Manickam
- Jayaprakash as Aditi's father
- Viji Chandrasekhar as Siddharth's mother
- Omar Lateef
- Venkatesh
- Yuvaraj Ganesan as Kathir
- Shirley Babithra (Bubble)
- Vignesh
- Raghu Dhaba
- Varsha
- Jaffar
- Kathir

== Music ==
The film's music was composed by Harris Jayaraj. The audio rights were acquired by T Series. The first single "Yamma Ghajini" was released on 15 November 2025, followed by the second single "Unnai Ninaithu" on 25 December, and third single "Un Paarvai" on 8 January 2026.

Track listing
No.	Title	Lyrics	Singer(s)	Length
1.	"Yamma Ghajini"	Madhan Karky, Arcus Aryian	Asal Kolaar, Suchith Suresh, Senthil Dass, Tamizh Adhavan	4:03
2.	"Unnai Ninaithu"	Vairamuthu	Sid Sriram, Prashanthini	3:43
3.	"Un Paarvai"	Madhan Karky	Vineeth Sreenivasan, Pragathi, Gayathry Rajiv	3:37
4.	"Halo Halo"	Madhan Karky	Nikhita Gandhi, Deepthi Suresh	4:35
5.	"KRR Theme"	–	–	2:05
6.	"Anbe Anbe"	Madhan Karky	Gayathry Rajiv	4:45
Total length:				22:38

== Release ==
Kadhal Reset Repeat was released in theatres on 6 March 2026. The film was distributed by Romeo Pictures in Tamil Nadu. Despite the United Arab Emirates being affected by the Iran war, the film was confirmed to still release there on 5 March as planned. The film began streaming on Amazon Prime Video from 9 April 2026.

== Reception ==
Prashanth Vallavan of Cinema Express rated the film 1.5 out of 5 stars and wrote, "Kadhal Reset Repeat props up problematic ideas combined with corny dialogues and the formulaic attempts at humour". Abhinav Subramanian of The Times of India rated the film 2 out of 5 stars and wrote, "A.L. Vijay has made good films before. This one plays like he forgot why". Maalai Malar wrote that while the locations, romantic sentiments and Jiya Shankar's performance were the film's strengths, the lack of strong moments in the screenplay was a drawback.
