= Chithirai Sevvaanam =

- Release poster
- Directed by: Silva
- Written by: Silva
- Story by: Vijay
- Produced by: A. L. Azhagappan; P. Mangayakarasi; Vijay (presenter)
- Starring: Samuthirakani; Rima Kallingal; Pooja Kannan
- Cinematography: Manoj Paramahamsa; K. G. Venkatesh
- Music by: Sam C. S.
- Production companies: Zee Studios; Think Big Studio; Amirtha Studios
- Distributed by: ZEE5
- Release date: 3 December 2021
- Country: India
- Language: Tamil

Chithirai Sevvaanam is a 2021 Indian Tamil-language crime drama film directed by Silva and co-written by Vijay. The film stars Samuthirakani, Rima Kallingal, and Pooja Kannan. It was released on 3 December 2021 on ZEE5.

== Synopsis ==
When a man's daughter goes missing after a private video of her is leaked, he teams up with an upright cop to find her and bring the perpetrators to justice.

== Cast ==
- Samuthirakani as Muthu Pandi
- Rima Kallingal as Aasha Nair
- Pooja Kannan as Aishwarya
  - Manasvi Kottachi as young Aishwarya
- Vidya Pradeep as Lakshmi
- Arvind Akash as Aasha's husband
- Nizhalgal Ravi
- Raja Rani Pandian
- T. Siva
- Subramaniam Siva
- Harini Suresh
- Pranav Bond
- Jeeva Balachandran
- Krish Silva
- Karate Karthi
- Mathew Varghese

== Production ==
The film marked the directorial debut of stuntman Stunt Silva, and the acting debut of Pooja Kannan, the sister of actress Sai Pallavi. Rima Kallingal made a return to Tamil films through the project after a ten year hiatus.

Silva was initially keen to debut with a comedy film but made Chithirai Sevvaanam at the request of his friend A. L. Vijay, who also wrote and produced the film.

== Release ==
The film was directly released on ZEE5 on 3 December 2021 and received mixed reviews. A critic from Sify.com called the film a "a decent watch for its core theme but the execution is average." In their review, the Times of India noted "Chithirai Sevvanam is a well intentioned movie that talks about the perils of technology and how women are easy targets. Loosely based on the Pollachi sexual harassment and extortion case, the movie does have its moments as it addresses the issue but fails largely due to the draggy melodrama". The NewsMinute called it "a well-intentioned but confused film on sexual violence".
