= Vanamagan =

2017 film by A. L. Vijay

- Theatrical release poster
- Directed by: Vijay
- Written by: Vijay
- Produced by: A. L. Azhagappan
- Starring: Ravi Mohan; Sayyeshaa
- Cinematography: Tirru
- Edited by: Anthony
- Music by: Harris Jayaraj
- Production company: Think Big Studio
- Distributed by: Kona Film Corporation
- Release date: 23 June 2017
- Running time: 141 minutes
- Country: India
- Language: Tamil

Vanamagan (transl. Son of the Forest) is a 2017 Indian Tamil-language action adventure film written and directed by Vijay. The film stars Ravi Mohan and Sayyeshaa, with Prakash Raj, Thambi Ramaiah, and Varun in supporting roles. The music was composed by Harris Jayaraj. with cinematography by Tirru and editing by Anthony. The venture began production in September 2016, and the film was released on 23 June 2017.

== Plot ==
Kavya, an orphan who inherited her late parents’ company, Kavya Industries, lives under the guardianship of her father's trusted associate, Rajasekhar. Though he manages the company on her behalf, Rajasekhar harbors ulterior motives and covets her wealth. When Kavya's New Year trip to Bora Bora is canceled due to passport issues, Rajasekhar suggests that she and her friends visit the Andaman Islands instead—a decision that sets off a chain of life-changing events.

During their reckless escapades in the Andamans, Kavya and her friends accidentally hit a tribal man with their car while fleeing the police. No local hospital agrees to treat him, so Kavya takes him to Chennai, disguising him as a local named “K. Vaasi.” After he recovers, Vaasi's primitive behavior shocks everyone, and Kavya, along with her cook Pandian, attempts to teach him human manners.

On Kavya's birthday, tensions arise between her and Vicky, her boyfriend and Rajasekhar's son. When Vicky tries to assault her during an argument, Vaasi intervenes and violently attacks him. Though Vaasi later regains his composure, the incident enrages Rajasekhar, who calls the police. Vaasi is captured and taken away, while Vicky is left paralyzed with a neck fracture.

Ordered to eliminate the “dangerous” Vaasi, the police take him into the forest. Kavya and Pandian arrive just as Vaasi breaks free, killing the corrupt officers. Pursued by the authorities, the trio flees into the jungle, where they encounter forest officer Shanmugam, who reveals that Vaasi's real name is Jara and that he is part of a native tribe resisting corporate encroachment.

Jara reunites with his people and soon saves a young girl (Shanmugam's daughter) from a tiger attack. Despite his heroism, the tribe faces eviction by a German corporation connected to Rajasekhar's industrial project. When the tribe refuses to relocate, police forces, under pressure from the German investors, launch a violent assault. Jara defends his people in a bloody battle, but he is ultimately captured and beaten unconscious.

The story flashes back, revealing that the tribal massacre occurred before Kavya's initial encounter with Jara. During that chaos, Jara escaped into the wilderness, where Kavya's car later struck him. Meanwhile, Rajasekhar returns from abroad and pressures authorities to capture Kavya, who has fled with Jara and Pandian.

At the forest operations center, commando Suryaprakash initiates Project Zero, a plan to encircle and eliminate the fugitives using surveillance drones and armed forces. The group is tracked through spy cameras but survives an ambush when a tiger suddenly attacks and kills several commandos, allowing them to escape.

The next morning, Rajasekhar confronts Kavya, accusing her of betraying him. She defends Jara, insisting that his people are victims of corporate greed. Rajasekhar reveals that she unwittingly authorized the land grab herself by signing an asset (at the beginning of the film). He abducts Kavya but is confronted by Jara, whom he runs over and shoots. Despite his injuries, Jara rises again and defeats the police and Rajasekhar. When Kavya pleads for peace, Jara stops short of killing Rajasekhar. Kavya renounces her inheritance, declaring she wants nothing more to do with Kavya Industries. Realizing the futility of his greed, Rajasekhar spares them and departs.

== Cast ==
- Ravi Mohan as Jara (K. Vaasi)
- Sayyeshaa as Kavya, Jara's lover
- Prakash Raj as Rajashekar
- Thambi Ramaiah as Puli Pandian
- Varun as Vignesh (Vicky)
- Arjunan as Arjun
- Vela Ramamoorthy as Jara's father
- Thalaivasal Vijay as Kavya's uncle
- Ramya Subramanian as Ramya
- Shanmugarajan as Shanmugam
- R. S. Shivaji as Airways Ticket Seller
- Sanjay Bharathi as Assistant Director
- Sam Paul as Michael Raj
- N. L. Srinivasan as Suryaprakash
- Milton Raju as Tama
- Ravi Venkatraman

== Production ==
After the success of Madarasapattinam, A. L. Vijay planned to cast Suriya in the lead role. Suriya liked the script, but the role did not materialise due to budget constraints. Later in November 2015, it was reported that A. L. Vijay would direct a film starring Ravi Mohan in the lead role. The actor confirmed that the duo would begin work on the project in the middle of 2016, following the completion of his other films. In May 2016, Vijay confirmed that the project would begin later in the year and revealed that the film would be shot extensively in the Andaman Islands. Music composer Harris Jayaraj was signed in this project due to Vijay's regular collaborator G.V. Prakash Kumar leaning heavily on acting commitments along with his wish to collaborate with Harris and cinematographer Tirru were also brought in for the project. The film was subsequently launched in September 2016 with production beginning thereafter in Chennai. Sayyeshaa was signed on to portray the leading female role in the film, marking her debut in Tamil films.

== Soundtrack ==
Vanamagan

Soundtrack album by Harris Jayaraj
- Released: 21 April 2017
- Recorded: 2017
- Studio: Studio H
- Genre: Feature film soundtrack
- Length: 26:55
- Label: Sony Music
- Producer: Harris Jayaraj

Harris Jayaraj chronology
S3 (2017)	Vanamagan (2017)	Spyder (2017)

The film's original soundtrack is scored by Harris Jayaraj, his first collaboration with director A. L. Vijay and third film with actor Ravi after Dhaam Dhoom and Engeyum Kaadhal. This is Jayaraj's 50th film as a composer. The complete album was released on 22 April 2017.

All lyrics are written by Madhan Karky, except where noted.

Track listing
No.	Title	Singer(s)	Length
1.	"Yemma Yea Azhagamma"	Bombay Jayashree, Haricharan	5:27
2.	"Damn Damn" (Lyrics by Vijay)	M. M. Manasi, Sherin Shahana	3:57
3.	"Silu Silu"	Vijay Yesudas	5:19
4.	"Morada Morada"	Benny Dayal and Krish	4:10
5.	"Pachchai Uduthiya Kaadu"	Abhay Jodhpurkar, Harini	5:35
6.	"Vanam (Theme)" (Instrumental)	Maria Roe Vincent and Flute Kamalakar	2:27
Total length:			26:55

== Release ==
Initially, the film had its release date fixed on 19 May 2017. Due to the announcement of a film industry strike on 30 May 2017, the producer has postponed the theatrical release to 23 June 2017. The film had its television premiere on 14 January 2018 via Zee Tamil.

== Reception ==
Baradwaj Rangan wrote for Film Companion, "Vanamagan gradually becomes terribly serious, and a comic adventure turns into a tiresomely earnest drama."
