= Mission: Chapter 1 =

2024 Indian Tamil-language film by A. L. Vijay

- Theatrical release poster
- Directed by: Vijay
- Written by: A. Mahadev
- Dialogues by: Vijay
- Produced by: Subaskaran Allirajah; M. Rajashekar; S. Swathi; Surya Vamsi Prasad Kotha; Jeevan Kotha
- Starring: Arun Vijay; Amy Jackson; Nimisha Sajayan
- Cinematography: Sandeep K. Vijay
- Edited by: Anthony
- Music by: G. V. Prakash Kumar
- Production companies: Lyca Productions; Shri Shirdi Sai Movies; New March Fast Pictures; Aspen Film Productions (P) Ltd.
- Release date: 12 January 2024
- Running time: 144 minutes
- Country: India
- Language: Tamil
- Box office: ₹23 crore

Mission: Chapter 1 (also marketed as Mission: Chapter 1 – Achcham Embadhu Illaiye; transl. There is no fear) is a 2024 Indian Tamil-language action thriller film directed by Vijay, co-written by A. Mahadev and produced by Lyca Productions, Shri Shirdi Sai Movies, New March Fast Pictures and Aspen Film Productions (P) Ltd. The film stars Arun Vijay, Amy Jackson and Nimisha Sajayan alongside Abi Hassan, Bharat Bopana and Iyal in the supporting roles. This marks Jackson's comeback Tamil film after a five-year hiatus.

The film was officially announced in October 2022 under the title Achcham Enbadhu Illaiye, but the title was later announced as Mission: Chapter 1 – Achcham Enbadhu Illaiye in April 2023 after a production change. Principal photography commenced in October 2022 and wrapped in February 2023. The music was composed by G. V. Prakash Kumar, cinematography was handled by Sandeep K. Vijay and editing by Anthony.

Mission: Chapter 1 – Achcham Enbadhu Illaiye was released on 12 January 2024, during Pongal weekend, to mixed-to-positive reviews from critics and became a box office success.

== Plot ==
V. Gunasekharan (aka Guna, Arun Vijay) is a man from Chennai, India. His daughter, Sana, suffers a severe accident and urgently needs surgery in London. Due to the lack of time, Guna cannot transfer the operation cost through legal means, so he turns to a money-laundering agency for help.

After depositing the money in India, the agent gives him a ₹10 note — a symbolic token that allows him to withdraw the money from their branch in the UK. Guna quickly flies to London and gets Sana admitted to the hospital. Thomas, a staff at that hospital who is a drug addict willing to do anything for money, overhears that Guna used a money-laundering service and plans to steal the ₹10 note. He and his gangster friends ambush Guna, attempting to rob him. However, Guna fights them off. When the police arrive, Guna — still defending himself — accidentally punches an officer and is arrested for assaulting a police officer.

Now detained, Guna pleads with the jailer, Sandra James (Amy Jackson), to grant him one day of leave so he can sign the necessary documents for his daughter's surgery. Sandra, however, denies his request.

Meanwhile, Omar Quadri (Bharat Bopana), leader of the notorious terrorist group Lashkar-e-Taiba, plans to attack the same jail to rescue three of his imprisoned men. Omar hacks into the jail's automated systems, cutting communications, jamming mobile signals, shutting down the electric fences, and unlocking all cell doors. Chaos erupts as prisoners riot and guards lock themselves inside offices for safety.

Despite his desperation to reunite with his daughter, Guna does not attempt to escape. Instead, he uses his exceptional combat skills, tactical intelligence, and knowledge of prison operations to take control of the situation. Working with Sandra and other staff, he stops the mass escape and discovers Omar's true plan — the riot was merely a diversion. The real objective was to free three specific prisoners through an alternative escape route. Guna manages to intercept and capture them.

It is then revealed that Guna was once a jailer in India. Days earlier, he had captured an inmate who tried to escape and later discovered he was a member of Lashkar-e-Taiba acting on Omar's orders. To avenge this, Omar orchestrated a bombing that killed Guna's wife and severely injured his daughter — the reason for her urgent London surgery. The inmate also exposed the identities of three of Omar's operatives in London — the same men Guna has now stopped from escaping.

Enraged by his failure, Omar orders the prisoners to start a mutiny in the kitchen and demands that Guna release his men. Guna once again fights off the attackers and rescues the kitchen staff without giving in.

A British military helicopter on patrol spots the riot but is attacked by Omar's militants, prompting the army to send reinforcements. Realizing he's running out of time, Omar kidnaps Sana from the hospital and demands that Guna release his men in exchange for her life. Guna agrees to the exchange.

During the tense standoff, a crossfire erupts. Guna manages to take down Omar and his entire team.

Days later, Guna wakes up in a hospital to learn that his daughter has successfully undergone her surgery — paid for by the British government, who honor him as a hero.

== Cast ==
- Arun Vijay as V. Gunasekharan aka Guna, Ex-jailer
- Amy Jackson as Sandra James, Jailer
- Nimisha Sajayan as Nancy Kurian
- Abi Hassan as Paramveer Singh
- Bharath Bopanna as Omar Quadri
- Iyal as Sana, Guna's daughter
- Viraj as Thomas
- Jason Shah as Neil

== Production ==
In July 2022, it was reported that Arun Vijay was to join hands for the first time with director A. L. Vijay for his next film after Yaanai (2022), with most the filming for the venture done in London, England. In September, Amy Jackson was announced as the lead actress, in her third collaboration with the director after Madrasapattinam (2010) and Thaandavam (2012). On 5 October, Sri Shridri Sai Movies, the production house funding the venture, officially announced the film. Lyca Productions later took over producing, and announced a new title in April 2023: Mission: Chapter 1 – Achcham Enbadhu Illaiye. Principal photography commenced on 4 October 2022 in London, and wrapped in February 2023.

== Music ==
The film's music was composed by G. V. Prakash Kumar. The audio rights were acquired by Sony Music India. The first single "Kannae Chella Kannae" was released on 3 January 2024. The second single "Achamae Achamae" was released on 9 January 2024.

== Release ==
The film was released in theatres on 12 January 2024, during the week of Pongal.

=== Home media ===
The film began streaming on Amazon Prime Video in India from 15 March 2024, and on Simply South OTT overseas the same day.

== Reception ==
=== Critical response ===
Roopa Radhakrishnan of The Times of India gave 2.5/5 and stated that "Mission Chapter 1 is an actioner that has a generic template and an effective cast, excluding a somewhat out-of-place Amy Jackson". Srinivasa Ramanujam of The Hindu said, "Director Vijay's Pongal release packs a lot of action but the storyline throws little surprises". Raisa Nasreen of Times Now gave 3/5 stars, stated that "Arun Vijay's action-packed thriller blends emotions And excitement. The makers believe that it will tick all the boxes for being a perfect entertainer".
