= Diya (film) =

2018 film directed by A. L. Vijay

- Poster of the Tamil version
- Directed by: Vijay
- Written by: Vijay
- Dialogues by: Vijay (Tamil); Ajayan Bala (Tamil); Sathya (Telugu)
- Produced by: Allirajah Subaskaran
- Starring: Sai Pallavi; Naga Shaurya; Veronika Arora
- Cinematography: Nirav Shah
- Edited by: Anthony
- Music by: Sam C. S.
- Production company: Lyca Productions
- Release date: 27 April 2018
- Running time: 97 minutes
- Country: India
- Languages: Tamil; Telugu

Diya is a 2018 Indian horror thriller film directed by Vijay and produced by Lyca Productions. The film was shot simultaneously in Tamil and Telugu languages, the latter titled as Kanam (transl. Particle). It stars Sai Pallavi (in her major Tamil film debut), Naga Shaurya and Veronika Arora in her acting debut. The music was composed by Sam C. S., with editing done by Anthony and cinematography by Nirav Shah. Both the Tamil and Telugu versions were released on 27 April 2018 and received mixed reviews from critics.

== Plot ==
19-year-old Thulasi gets pregnant because of Krishna, but their family decides to abort the child. After five years, they get married, but Thulasi is not very happy because of their past. Later, Krishna tells her to let go of the past, and soon, she comes out of the pain and starts leading a happy life.

The truth that is happening around Thulasi and Krishna is that their little unborn girl Diya has always been with them all along invisibly. When Krishna's father comes to meet Krishna at his new flat, Diya sees him and starts following him to his house. The next day, Krishna's father is found dead in the water tank of their building. This is Diya's plan for revenge. Later, when Thulasi's mother comes to visit Krishna's father's funeral, Diya starts following her and kills her in an elevator in Krishna's construction site. Sub-Inspector Raghavan, who is handling the death case, comes to the conclusion that both of them are dead due to asphyxiation.

When Krishna and Thulasi visit the hospital, they meet their family doctor, who also happens to die in a car accident because of Diya. There rises a suspicion within the investigating team that whoever meets Thulasi and Krishna are dying due to the same reason. The police also found it suspicious that the doctor's car had child lock on when there was actually no child in the car. One day, Thulasi's uncle comes to visit her. Thulasi looks at her family picture and suddenly realises that the deaths surrounding them are happening for the same reason. When she was pregnant with Diya, she was forced by her mother, father-in-law, uncle, doctor, and Krishna to abort the child. Realizing that her uncle may be the next to be killed, Thulasi calls him, but it is too late as a huge container falls on him, killing him. Thulasi thinks that Diya is with her and calls out her name, to which she responds by making the carousel doll move, making Thulasi realise that all the deaths are indeed because of her. She tries to tell this to Krishna and insists that she has to be with him always so that Diya will not kill him, but he does not believe these stories and takes her to a psychiatrist.

One day, Krishna gets a call from the construction site and leaves without telling Thulasi. She panics and calls him, but he hangs up. When she reaches his site, she saves him just in time from a crane carrying a huge block that was about to hit him. Krishna still does not believe in Thulasi's suspicions and at a priest's suggestion to have a Pooja, they make arrangements, but Thulasi dreams about those people burning Diya and she is suffering in pain, so she sends the priests away. Meanwhile, Krishna meets the psychiatrist, who suggests that Krishna go somewhere alone and switch off his phone for two days, and Thulasi will finally stop panicking once he returns safe and sound.

The next day, Krishna is gone, and Thulasi is worried and keeps searching for him. Diya takes this opportunity and tries to kill Krishna by making the walls of his room close in on each other to crush him to death. Meanwhile, Raghavan thinks that whatever Thulasi says is true and goes in search of her, but he finds that she met with an accident and is unconscious, so he takes her to the hospital, where they try to revive her heart. Thulasi's spirit sees Diya and stops her from killing Krishna. Krishna understands that Thulasi was right. The doctors are able to successfully revive Thulasi, and tears roll from her eyes, and she is happy that she finally met Diya. The doctor then says that Thulasi is pregnant.

== Cast ==
Actor (Tamil)	Actor (Telugu)	Role (Tamil)	Role (Telugu)
Sai Pallavi		Thulasi	Thulasi
Naga Shaurya		Krishna	Krishna
Veronika Arora		Diya	Diya
RJ Balaji	Priyadarshi Pulikonda	Sub-Inspector K. Ragavan	Sub-Inspector K. Agni
Rekha		Thulasi's mother	Thulasi's mother
Nizhalgal Ravi		Krishna's father	Krishna's father
Sujitha		Doctor	Doctor
Santhana Bharathi		Real Estate Broker	Real Estate Broker
Jayakumar		Thulasi's uncle	Thulasi's uncle
Stunt Silva		Swamiji	Swamiji
Elango Kumaravel	Sai Ramesh Bhagavatula	Constable Balakumar	Constable Balakumar
T. M. Karthik	Sathya	Constable Ramesh	Constable Ramesh
Gandhari Nithin		Ram	Ram

== Production ==
In April 2017, it was announced that Vijay, who was attached to direct a Tamil remake of the Malayalam film Charlie (2015) starring Sai Pallavi, shelved the project and would instead begin work on a separate film titled Karu, produced by Lyca Productions with Sai Pallavi retained. It became her first Tamil film following a series of projects which she dropped out of or was replaced in. Filming began the same month, with Vijay revealing he had written the script "three and a half years ago".

Telugu actor Naga Shaurya was signed on to make his debut in Tamil, while child actress Veronika Arora made her acting debut. Filming was complete by September 2017, with Sai Pallavi beginning her dubbing work. Vijay stated that the film would explore the "story of a young mother and her four-year-old child" and was also about abortion. In April 2018, the film's title was changed from Karu to Diya. The film was simultaneously shot in Telugu as Kanam. Some scenes from the Telugu version were dubbed from Tamil.

== Soundtrack ==
Diya / Kanam

Soundtrack album by Sam C. S.
- Released: 24 February 2018
- Genre: Feature film soundtrack
- Length: 17:34
- Languages: Tamil; Telugu
- Label: Lyca Productions

Sam C. S. chronology
6 Athiyayam (2018)	Diya / Kanam (2018)	Iravukku Aayiram Kangal (2018)
External audio
- Audio Jukebox on YouTube

The music is composed by Sam C. S. and all lyrics are by Madhan Karky.

Tamil track listing
No.	Title	Singer(s)	Length
1.	"Aalaliloo"	Swagatha S. Krishnan
2.	"Konjali"	Sathyaprakash Dharmar, Neha Venugopal, JKA Shalini
3.	"Karuve"	K. S. Chithra
4.	"Voice of Karu"	Chennai Orchestra
5.	"Sound of Revenge"	Chennai Orchestra

All lyrics are written by Krishna Madineni.

Telugu Track listing (Kanam)
No.	Title	Singer(s)	Length
1.	"Jo Lali Jo"	Swagatha S. Krishnan
2.	"Sanjali"	Aravind Srinivas, Anu Anand
3.	"Kaname"	Latha Srinivas
4.	"Voice of Kanam"	Chennai Orchestra
5.	"Sound of Revenge"	Chennai Orchestra

== Release ==
Diya faced delays in its release due to a strike declared by the Tamil Film Producers Council, with the delays also affecting Kanam; after the strike ended, both versions were released on 27 April 2018. Diya had its television premiere on 7 August 2019 via Zee Cinema.

== Reception ==
Diya and Kanam received mixed reviews from critics. Ashameera Aiyappan of The Indian Express gave it a rating of 2.5/5 and said, "The story is predictable. There isn't much surprise beyond the first few minutes until the very end." However, she praised the music and said Sai Pallavi "makes a strong debut in Tamil with an incredibly subtle and measured performance." Priyanka Sundar of Hindustan Times gave a rating of 1.5/5 and said, "Sai Pallavi's stunning performance cannot save this confusing film." Kirubhakar Purushothaman of India Today also gave the same rating and said it "comes across as a half-baked, confusing at times, bothering take on the whole issue of abortion."

Sify criticised the film's predictability and lack of chemistry between the lead actors but lauded the short runtime, cinematography, CG and background score. M. Suganth of The Times of India gave a rating of 3/5, praising the performance of Sai Pallavi, cinematography and music but said, "Despite these strengths, Diya isn't compelling enough." Regarding Kanam, Neeshita Nyayapati of The Times of India stated, "One would expect Kanam to be nothing less than a thriller that will keep you guessing and at the edge of your seat. However, it fails to live up to that expectation".
