= Kireedam (2007 film) =

- Directed by: Vijay
- Written by: Vijay; Na. Muthukumar (dialogues)
- Screenplay by: Vijay
- Story by: A. K. Lohithadas
- Based on: Kireedam (Malayalam)
- Produced by: Suresh Balaje
- Starring: Ajith Kumar; Trisha; Rajkiran; Ajay
- Cinematography: Tirru; Nirav Shah
- Edited by: Anthony
- Music by: G. V. Prakash Kumar
- Production companies: Sujatha Cine Arts; Adlabs Limited
- Release date: 20 July 2007
- Running time: 157 minutes
- Country: India
- Language: Tamil

Kireedam (transl. Crown) is a 2007 Indian Tamil-language action drama film directed by Vijay (in his directorial debut). The film is the Tamil remake of the 1989 Malayalam film of the same name. It stars Ajith Kumar in the main lead role alongside Trisha and Rajkiran, while Vivek, Saranya, Ajay (his Tamil debut) and Santhanam appear in supporting roles. The film's score and soundtrack are composed by G. V. Prakash Kumar, while Tirru was the cinematographer.

Kireedam released on 20 July 2007. The film received positive reviews and became a commercial success at the box office. It was dubbed into Telugu as Poorna Market.

== Plot ==
In Trichy, Rajarajan, a police constable, lives with his loving family: wife Rajeswari, two sons, and two daughters. He wants his elder son, Sakthivel, to become a police sub-inspector. Rajarajan has a cordial and amiable relationship with Sakthi. Rajarajan's unwavering commitment to honesty often lands him in trouble. Meanwhile, Sakthi proposes to Divya after a few encounters, and she eventually reciprocates. Delighted by their love, Rajarajan arranges their engagement. Sakthi successfully clears his sub-inspector exams and heads to Chennai for the interview.

However, Rajarajan's life takes a turn when he reprimands an MLA's son for a traffic offense. The MLA demands an apology, but Rajarajan refuses, leading to his punishment transfer to Kodiyakkarai, under the tyrannical control of local don Varadarajan "Varadan," who dominates the harbor and instills fear among the locals. When Rajarajan arrests one of Varadan's henchmen, Varadan retaliates, beating Rajarajan. Sakthi, who is at the market, intervenes to protect his father. Varadan attacks Sakthi, but Sakthi overpowers him, shattering Rajarajan's dream of making him a policeman. The villagers celebrate Sakthi's bravery. Varadan recovers from his injuries and vows to avenge his defeat, but he and his associates are arrested on murder charges related to the killing of Munnar Ravi. A bar fight instigated by Sakthi's friend Kumar mistakenly implicates Sakthi, further complicating his life.

Chellapandi, an associate of Varadan's rival group, collaborates with Sakthi's brother-in-law, exploiting Sakthi's popularity for personal financial gain. Sakthi confronts and beats Chellapandi and his brother-in-law for misusing his name. Sakthi's brother-in-law feigns innocence, deceiving the family and shifting the blame to Sakthi. Trusting Sakthi's brother-in-law, Rajarajan, who is already concerned about Sakthi's perceived descent into criminality, expels Sakthi from their home. Divya's parents plan to cancel her marriage to Sakthi and arrange a new groom for her. Meanwhile, Varadan's men, Maasilamani and Jayakumar, are released on bail and immediately seek revenge against Sakthi, attacking him on a busy road. Sakthi flees, but they chase him, causing public disturbance. Forced to retaliate, Sakthi assaults Maasilamani and Jayakumar. Rajarajan, initially elated by Sakthi's success in the SI exam, after learning about Sakthi's brawl with Varadan's men, reprimands and beats Sakthi at the police station. Rajarajan assures Divya's father that Sakthi will not interfere with their marriage plans, prompting Sakthi to sacrifice his love. With Varadan's bail impending, the inspector advises Sakthi to leave town, citing safety concerns.

Sakthi returns to Trichy, where Divya confesses her enduring love for him. She also tells him that she has not cancelled her plan to marry Sakthi. Varadan, seeking to lure Sakthi back to Kodiyakkarai, attacks Sakthi's family. Alerted by a sub-inspector, Sakthi rushes back to Kodiyakkarai, determined to settle the score with Varadan once and for all. Intentionally allowing Varadan to beat him, Sakthi hopes that Varadan will spare his family if he is killed. However, Sakthi regains the upper hand, subduing Varadan. Sakthi kills Varadan in front of Rajarajan and the police. Rajarajan asks him to surrender; a devastated Sakthi wails, and Rajarajan is emotional, while the police force arrest Sakthi. As Sakthi is jailed, Rajarajan is told that Sakthi is disqualified from joining the police force, citing him as a "criminal".

Alternative ending: As Sakthi kills Varadan to ensure his family's safety, Rajarajan asks him to surrender, and the devastated Sakthi wails, surrenders, and is arrested. Despite this, the court acquits Sakthi, recognizing Varadan as a social menace and considering Sakthi's future. Ultimately, Rajarajan's dream is fulfilled as Sakthi becomes a sub-inspector.

== Cast ==
- Ajith Kumar as Sakthivel (Sakthi)
- Trisha as Divya
- Rajkiran as Rajarajan, Sakthivel's father
- Vivek as Sakthivel's brother-in-law
- Saranya as Rajeswari, Sakthivel's mother
- Santhanam as Balasubramaniam, Sakthivel's friend
- Ajay as Varadarajan "Varadan"
- Cochin Haneefa as Chellapandi
- Ravi Kale as Inspector
- K. P. A. C. Lalitha as Sakthivel's grandmother
- M. S. Bhaskar as Sub-Inspector
- Manobala as Constable Muthusamy
- Sathyan as Sakthivel's friend
- Anju Mahendran as Kumar, Muthusamy's son
- Bala Singh as Maasilamani
- Jayakumar as Jayakumar, Varadarajan's henchman
- Ravi Prakash as Divya's father
- Meena Kumari as Mullai, Sakthivel's elder sister
- Jaya Murali as Divya's mother
- Pinky as Sakthivel's younger sister
- Vinoth as Vinoth, Sakthivel's younger brother
- Periya Karuppu Thevar as Villager
- Muthukaalai as Villager
- Nellai Siva as an Auto Driver
- Munnar Ramesh as Munnar Ravi, Vardarajan's former associate
- KVN Manimegalai as Munnar Ravi's wife (uncredited)
- Vimal as Sakthivel's friend (uncredited)

== Production ==
The film was announced in September 2006 as a collaboration between producer Balaji and Ajith, and was to be co-produced by the Mumbai-based production company Adlabs. Vijay made his directorial debut with Kireedam after working as an ad filmmaker and chose to remake the 1989 film of the same name directed by Sibi Malayil. He was a former assistant to Malayalam director Priyadarshan, who directed Gardish, the Hindi remake of Kireedam.

Ajith Kumar was signed to appear in the lead role with Trisha, Rajkiran, Saranya and Vivek also a part of the cast, while the cinematographer was Tirru, music was composed by G. V. Prakash Kumar and the film was edited by Anthony. Vijay revealed that he "reworked about 80 per cent" from the original version. The film was briefly renamed Magudam, before being changed again. The film marked the comeback of production company Sujatha film Arts into film production after 17 years.

The first schedule of shooting took place in Rajamundry. In the 20-day schedule, some crucial scenes were shot with Ajith, including a fight scene with Ajay. Choreographed by stunt master Super Subbarayan, it had Ajith taking on Ajay and members of his gang. The second schedule continued in Chennai. A lavish set was erected by art director Selvakumar. A fight scene was shot here too between Ajith, Ajay, and 20 stuntmen who played Ajay’s henchmen. Ennore harbour was the venue of some more stunt scenes.

== Soundtrack ==
Kireedam

Soundtrack album by G. V. Prakash Kumar
- Released: 5 June 2007
- Recorded: 2007
- Genre: Feature film soundtrack
- Length: 28:54
- Labels: Big Music; T-Series
- Producer: G. V. Prakash

G. V. Prakash Kumar chronology
Oram Po (2007)	Kireedam (2007)	Polladhavan (2007)

The album consists of six tracks, five songs and a theme music track composed by G. V. Prakash Kumar. Dharan revealed that he had the opportunity to work for Kireedam but he could not take up the project as he was going through a tough phase then, suffering a personal loss in his family.

All tracks are written by Na. Muthukumar.

Tracklist
No.	Title	Singer(s)	Length
1.	"Akkam Pakkam "	Sadhana Sargam	5:12
2.	"Vizhiyil Un Vizhiyil"	Sonu Nigam, Swetha Mohan	4:38
3.	"Kanavellam"	P. Jayachandran, Karthik	5:10
4.	"Kanneer Thuliye"	Vijay Yesudas	5:20
5.	"Vilaiyaadu Vilaiyaadu"	Shankar Mahadevan	4:09
6.	"Kireedom - Theme" (Instrumental)		4:25
Total length:			28:54

== Release ==
Kireedam released on 20 July 2007.

=== Marketing ===
A game was released about the film by Zapak Digital Entertainment Ltd to promote the film. In the game, the player has to help Shakti kill the gangsters while undergoing police training using different weapons. The player has to defend himself using different keys and approach the red cross to gain health. While doing this he can not let his father Rajaram catch him, which will bring the game to an end.

== Reception ==
The Hindu, in a review of Kireedam, said that "Vijay has neatly packaged a strong storyline with a sensibly balanced mix of sentiment and action. At no point does the film sag." It appreciated the lead and supporting cast: "Looking well-toned and incredibly youthful, Ajith makes a mark both with his appearance and expressions. And matching him equally in the two departments is an awesome Trisha."

Sify hailed the attempt: "For once a Tamil remake of a Malayalam classic, lives up to our expectations. Kireedam is quality cinema, one that is daringly different from the run-of-the mill superstar films that are dished out in the name of mass movies." Sify.com added, "On the whole, Kireedam is an engaging entertainer which is so rare to find these days. Go for it!"

Behindwoods gave it 3.5 out of 5 stars with the verdict "Complete family entertainer". It called the movie a "good realistic attempt towards meaningful cinema. But if the sluggish pace in the second half is taken care of, the movie would have been much crisper" and said that "Kreedom will categorically be Ajith's prized trophy in his film career."

Manasvini of Kalki praised the acting of Rajkiran and Ajith, Prakash's music, Thiru's cinematography, Antony's editing and cited director Vijay is the one who needs to shake hands. A bouquet should be given for narrating the emotional struggle of father and son with elegance and he has elevated Ajith in his debut film.

Chennai Online wrote "Debutant director Vijay (son of producer Azhagappan and brother of hero Udaya), moves his narration fairly smoothly. While he has remained faithful to the crucial events in the original version, and to the finale, he has brought in a few changes - Like the more elaborate love track. No doubt Vijay has managed to weave them fairly neatly into the Story. But in the process, the central plot has lost out on its essence, depth and intensity. And the final product has turned out to be yet another routine simple youth versus gangster saga, and an average, run-of-the-mill entertainer".

The film went on to win a single Filmfare award for Best Female Playback Singer for Sadhana Sargam's rendition of "Akkam Pakkam". Moreover, the film was nominated in four categories during the Vijay Awards for 2007, with Rajkiran, G. V. Prakash Kumar, Trisha and Sadhana Sargam being nominated in their respective categories.

The final scene in the film was changed after release from a sad to an upbeat ending after the producers felt that the original scene may keep audiences away. The film consequently went on to become a profitable venture at the box office.
