= Ajayan Bala =

Indian writer, actor, film director and screenplay writer

- Born: Kancheepuram, Tamil Nadu, India
- Occupations: Writer, actor, film director
- Years active: 2009–present

Ajayan Bala is an Indian writer, actor, and film director from Kancheepuram, Tamilnadu. His book Ulaka cin̲imā varalār̲u : maun̲ayukam 1894-1929 was awarded as best book in the fine arts section by Tamil Nadu Government in 2007. He has written several fiction and non-fiction works in Tamil. He has written a history serial in the popular Tamil magazine Ananda Vikatan.

He has written story and screen play for the movies Chennaiyil Oru Naal, Manithan, and Thalaivii. He has also directed one of the chapters in the horror anthology 6 Athiyayam.

== Bibliography ==
=== Novels ===
- Pakalmeenkal (published as a serial in Kalki)

=== Short story collections ===
- Mayilvakanan and other stories (Marutha Pathippakam)
- Moondravathu Arai Nanbanin Kathal Kathai
- Ajayan Bala Sirukathaikal (Nathan Pathippakam)
- Muthukkal Pathu (Amrutha Pathippakam)

=== Translated Screenplays ===
- The Battle of Algiers
- Bicycle Thieves

=== Biographies ===
- Ambedkar
- Annai Theresa
- Oviyar Van Gogh
- Karl Marx
- Charlie Chaplin
- Che Guevara
- Nelson Mandela
- Nethaji Subhas Chandra Bose
- Periyar
- Martin Luther King

=== Other Non-Fiction ===
- Mudivatra Kalaignan: Marlon Brando
- Sumar Ezhuthalanum Super Star-um
- Semmozhi Sirpigal (Life of 100 Tamil scholars)
- Ulaka cin̲imā varalār̲u : maun̲ayukam 1894–1929

== Filmography ==
=== As director and writer ===
Year	Title	Credited as		Notes
Year	Title	Director	Writer	Notes
2013	Chennaiyil Oru Naal	No	Screenplay	
2013	Vana Yuddham	No	Dialogues	Tamil version
2016	Manithan	No	Dialogues	
2018	6 Athiyayam	Yes	Yes	Anthology film; segment: "Misai"
2018	Diya	No	Dialogues	Tamil version
2018	Lakshmi	No	Dialogues	Tamil version
2019	Nethraa	No	Dialogues	
2019	Watchman	No	Dialogues	
2021	Thalaivii	No	Story	
2023	Memories	No	Dialogues	
2024	Uyir Thamizhukku	No	Yes	
2026	Mylanji	Yes	Yes	

=== As actor ===
- Chithiram Pesuthadi (2006)
- Vaalmiki (2009)
- Madrasapattinam (2010)
- Thenmerku Paruvakaatru (2010)
- Krishnaveni Panjaalai (2012)

=== Web series ===
- Love Bullet (2021)
