= Devi (2016 film) =

2016 Indian film by A. L. Vijay

- Theatrical release poster in Tamil
- Directed by: Vijay
- Screenplay by: Vijay; Sathya; Chintan Gandhi
- Dialogues by: Kona Venkat (Telugu)
- Story by: Paul Aaron; Vijay
- Produced by: Tamil: Prabhu Deva; Ishari K. Ganesh; Telugu: M. V. V. Satyanarayana; Hindi: Sonu Sood
- Starring: Tamannaah; Prabhu Deva; Sonu Sood
- Cinematography: Manush Nandan
- Edited by: Anthony
- Music by: Songs: Sajid–Wajid; Vishal Mishra; Raaj Ashoo; Hindi Songs: Gurinder Seagal; MusicMG; Background Score: Gopi Sundar
- Production companies: Tamil: Prabhu Deva Studios; Vels Films International; Telugu: MVV Cinema; Hindi: Shakti Sagar Productions
- Distributed by: Tamil: Auraa Cinemas; Telugu: Prabhu Deva Studios; Kona Film Corporation; Blue Circle Corporation; BLN Cinema; Hindi: Pooja Entertainment
- Release date: 7 October 2016
- Running time: 130 minutes
- Country: India
- Languages: Tamil; Telugu; Hindi
- Budget: ₹11 crore

Devi (transl. Goddess) is a 2016 Indian trilingual comedy horror film co-written and directed by Vijay. It features Tamannaah in the titular role along with Prabhu Deva and Sonu Sood. RJ Balaji, Saptagiri, Rajiv Thakur and Murali Sharma appear in supporting roles. In addition to Tamil, the film was also simultaneously shot in Telugu and Hindi as Abhinetri (transl. Actress) and Tutak Tutak Tutiya, respectively.

All three versions were theatrically released worldwide on 7 October 2016. Devi and Abhinetri were commercial successes at the box office.

== Plot ==
Krishna is a happy-go-lucky Tamilian (Telugu in Telugu version) who works in Mumbai. He is originally from Coimbatore (Rajahmundry in Telugu version). He spends his time searching for his dream girl. He wants his life partner to have a good education and possess supermodel looks. He does not want a country girl for a wife. His grandmother is on her deathbed, and his father wants him to get married. His father, with the aid of his grandmother, chooses a girl from their village named Muthampatti (Vetapalem in the Telugu version). He tries many times to stop the marriage, but nothing works. He marries the girl, Devi, unwillingly. He tries to get rid of her and shifts to a new house to hide her from his friends.

After moving to the new house, Devi changes in personality, surprising Krishna. He unwillingly takes her to a film festival where, to his shock, she dances and calls herself Ruby. She attracts the attention of Bollywood superstar Raj Khanna. Krishna inquires about the house with his neighbours. To his disbelief, he learns about the past owner, a girl called Ruby. She was an actress who was supposed to debut with Raj. Another actress replaced her, which caused her to fall into depression and commit suicide in that very house. He finds out that Ruby possessed his wife. Ruby gets an acting offer for the third sequel of Revolver Raja with Raj, and she forces Krishna to let her attend every rehearsal. Eventually, Krishna makes a deal with her to end this after one movie. Through the filmmaking process, which involves Krishna lying to Devi, Krishna begins to appreciate his wife and falls in love with her. Ruby and Krishna also become close friends.

At the movie release, Krishna praises Ruby for her excellent acting, but she betrays him and does not leave Devi's body as promised. Krishna tries to make her leave by exposing her in the press conference, but she tricks him. At that point, Raj also proposes to her. She faints, and they rush to the hospital. The doctor reveals that Devi is pregnant with Krishna's child. Krishna begs Ruby to leave his wife's body, and Ruby obeys. The movie ends with Krishna and Devi happy together, while we see Ruby's name on a name tag in a trash bin disappear.

In the Tamil and Telugu versions, after a few years, Krishna and Devi live happily and have a child by the time. Krishna goes out to work, but Ruby possesses him, whose name tag is back. This scene sets the stage for the sequel.

In the Hindi version, Raj is swarmed by his fans asking for an autograph, and in the midst of all, he recognizes a hand stretched out, asking for his autograph. He asked for her name, and she answered, "Ruby."

== Cast ==
Actor			Role		
Telugu	Tamil	Hindi	Telugu	Tamil	Hindi
Prabhu Deva			Krishna Kumar	Krishna Kumar	Krishna Kumar
Tamannaah Bhatia (voice dubbed by Haritha in Telugu)			Devi / Ruby (Possessed)	Devi / Ruby (Possessed)	Devi / Ruby (Possessed)
Sonu Sood (voice dubbed by RCM Raju in Telugu)			Raj Khanna	Raj Khanna	Raj Khanna
Saptagiri	RJ Balaji	Rajiv Thakur	Buchi	Ganesan	Krishna's friend
Murali Sharma			Dilip	Dilip	Dilip
Abijith Paul			Vikki (the film producer's son)	Vikki (the film producer's son)	Vikki (the film producer's son)
Gurpreet Kaur			Krishna's colleague	Krishna's colleague	Krishna's colleague
R. V. Udayakumar			Devi's father	Devi's father	Devi's father
Joy Mathew			Krishna's father	Krishna's father	Krishna's father
Hema			Devi's mother	Devi's mother	Devi's mother
RJ Ajay			Krishna's colleagues	Krishna's colleagues	Krishna's colleagues
Omar Lateef			Krishna's colleagues	Krishna's colleagues	Krishna's colleagues
Chintan Gandhi			Krishna's colleagues	Krishna's colleagues	Krishna's colleagues
Ravi Khanna			the film producer	the film producer	the film producer
Prudhviraj	Nassar	Nassar	occult practitioner	occult practitioner	occult practitioner
Sathish		Shyam	Mad Max	Mad Max	Mad Max
Raj Arjun			Sanjay Kumar, director of Revolver Raja series	Sanjay Kumar, director of Revolver Raja series	Sanjay Kumar, director of Revolver Raja series
Kanwalpreet Singh			Krishna's colleague	Krishna's colleague	Krishna's colleague
Seeniammal			villager	villager	villager
Cameo appearances
Farah Khan			herself	herself	herself
RJ Balaji	Saptagiri	Saptagiri	yellow T-shirt man that talks to Krishna's friend	yellow T-shirt man that talks to Krishna's friend	yellow T-shirt man that talks to Krishna's friend
Rajiv Thakur		RJ Balaji	yellow T-shirt man that talks to Krishna's friend	yellow T-shirt man that talks to Krishna's friend	yellow T-shirt man that talks to Krishna's friend
Sanjay Bharathi (assistant director)			Mumbai taxi driver (uncredited)	Mumbai taxi driver (uncredited)	Mumbai taxi driver (uncredited)
Appear in the song "Chal Maar"
Raju Sundaram			Dev	Dev	Krishna's crush's lover
Amy Jackson			Jennifer	Jennifer	Krishna's crush
Cameo appearances in Hindi version
Esha Gupta			Ruby	Ruby	Ruby
Shah Rukh Khan			voiceover in trailer	voiceover in trailer	voiceover in trailer

== Production ==
"The trilingual shoot was a very strenuous task. It is a bad idea. Of course, all of us knew the three languages but it was very tiring. Prabhu sir handled it much easily than I did. Also, I had two roles to play and the top of all these, the dance sequences too which was a crucial part of the film. Even I had to act thrice and dance thrice. In fact I was the one who gave this bad idea to make it in all the three languages".

— Tamannaah Bhatia, 2016

Devi was announced as a trilingual film to be made in Tamil, Telugu and Hindi after Tamannaah Bhatia's suggestion since Prabhu Deva also knew all three languages. In June 2016, the Telugu version was revealed to be titled Abhinetri (transl. Actress). The Hindi version was initially titled Two in One before it was given the Punjabi title Tutak Tutak Tutiya. Hollywood director Paul Aaron co-wrote the film with A. L. Vijay. Tamannaah and Sonu Sood play actors in the film. Devi was simultaneously filmed in Telugu and Hindi, respectively with a slightly different supporting cast for each version. Tamannaah dubbed for herself for the Hindi version.

== Soundtrack ==
=== Tamil version ===
Devi(L)

Soundtrack album by: Sajid–Wajid Vishal Mishra Raaj Ashoo
- Released: 27 September 2016
- Genre: Feature film soundtrack
- Length: 20:46
- Labels: Prabhu Deva Studios; Divo

All lyrics are written by Na. Muthukumar.

Devi (L) (Original Motion Picture Soundtrack)
No.	Title	Lyrics	Music	Singer(s)	Length
1.	"Chalmaar"	Na. Muthukumar	Sajid–Wajid	Benny Dayal	4:19
2.	"Kokka Makka"	Na. Muthukumar	Sajid–Wajid	Shivranjani Singh	3:34
3.	"Pesamal Pesi Parthen"	Na. Muthukumar	Vishal Mishra	Karthik	4:34
4.	"Rang Rang Rangoli"	Na. Muthukumar	Vishal Mishra	Shreya Ghoshal	5:27
5.	"Tutak Tutak"	—	Raaj Ashoo	—	3:32
Total length:					20:46

=== Telugu version ===
Abhinetri (Original Motion Picture Soundtrack)
No.	Title	Lyrics	Music	Singer(s)	Length
1.	"Chal Maar"	Ramajogayya Sastry	Sajid–Wajid	Nakash Aziz	4:17
2.	"Dance Chey Mazaga"	Ramajogayya Sastry	Sajid–Wajid	Geetha Madhuri	3:33
3.	"Aakasham Lo Rangulanni"	Sreejo	Vishal Mishra	Karthik	4:30
4.	"Rang Rang Rangare"	Sreejo	Vishal Mishra	Swetha Mohan	5:36
5.	"Tutak Tutak"	—	Raaj Ashoo	—
Total length:					20:48

=== Hindi version ===
Tutak Tutak Tutiya (Original Motion Picture Soundtrack)
No.	Title	Lyrics	Music	Singer(s)	Length
1.	"Rail Gaddi"	Shabbir Ahmed	Gurinder Seagal	Swati Sharma, Navraj Hans	3:48
2.	"Chal Maar"	Irfan Kamal	Sajid–Wajid	Wajid Ali	4:19
3.	"Tutak Tutak Tutiya (Title Track)"	Veer Rahimpuri, Shabbir Ahmed	Raaj Ashoo	Malkit Singh, Kanika Kapoor, Sonu Sood	3:32
4.	"Love The Way You Dance"	MusicMG	MusicMG	Jazzy B, Sonu Sood, Millind Gaba	3:38
5.	"Chalte Chalte"	Manoj Yadav	Vishal Mishra	Arijit Singh	4:36
6.	"Suku Suku"	Danish Sabri	Sajid–Wajid	Shivranjani Singh	3:55
7.	"Ranga Re"	Pranav Vatsa	Vishal Mishra	Shreya Ghoshal	5:25
Total length:					28:52

== Reception ==
=== Abhinetri ===
A critic from The Hindu rated the film 3 1/4 out of 5 and opined that "Except for the 'Tutak Tutak Tutiya' number where the lyrics seem more Hindi than Telugu, the makers ensure that Abhinetri remains a Telugu film at heart". 123 Telugu gave the film a rating of three out of five and said that "Abhinetri is a very simple tale that keeps you occupied (if not entertained) for its two hours duration. if you ignore the few gltiches here and there, it is a movie that can be watched once." Jeevi of Idlebrain gave the film the same rating and noted that "Abhinetri is one such kind of film that works based on its content, not just because of the thrills and fear factor". His only criticism was that the film had the effect of "a dubbing film".

=== Devi ===
M. Suganth of The Times of India gave the film a rating of three-and-a-half out of five stars and said that "Vijay gives us a story that is quite simple and at the same time empathetic". Behindwoods gave the film the same rating and said that "A wholesome ghost story that engages and entertains". Sify called the film "engaging" while criticizing the film's Hindi-dubbed feel and Bollywoodesque songs. The Hindu said that "Devi works as an engaging horror film, save for the overdose of dance and frolic that takes away the thrills" and added that "Devi is A.L. Vijay's way of saying he can do pei-sa vasool entertainers too". Onmanorama wrote that "Devi works solely because of its treatment of the genre and for bringing back Prabhudheva in a memorable role".

=== Tutak Tutak Tutiya ===
Hindustan Times gave a rating of two out of five stars and opined that "If you are looking for an entertaining, paisa-vasool movie, Tutak Tutak Tutiya should be your pick". The Times of India gave the film a rating of three out of five stars and wrote that "Despite being a tad underwhelming, Tutak Tutak Tutiya is a fairly enjoyable film that can be watched on a family outing". The India Express gave the film a rating of a half out of five stars and stated that "What happens when Prabhu Deva is not given enough dance numbers but is expected to act and Tamannah Bhatia is turned into a sari-clad frump? Horror!" IANS rated the film 2 1/2 and wrote that "Overall, while the film is engaging and intriguing, it suffers from a fatigued second half and an absurd ending. But nevertheless, it keeps you in splits. A better star cast would have elevated this film".

== Awards and nominations ==
Year	Award	Category	Recipient	Outcome	Ref.
2017	Asianet Film Awards	Most Popular Tamil Actress	Tamannaah Bhatia	Won	
2017	Filmfare Awards South	Best Actress – Tamil	Tamannaah Bhatia	Nominated	

== Sequel ==
After the success of Devi and Abhinetri, the makers planned a sequel, titled Devi 2 and Abhinetri 2, respectively. The film was released on 31 May 2019, with Prabhu Deva, Tamannaah Bhatia, RJ Balaji, and Saptagiri reprising their roles.
