= Devi 2 =

2019 film directed by A. L. Vijay

- Theatrical release poster in Tamil
- Directed by: Vijay
- Screenplay by: Vijay; Sathya
- Produced by: R. Ravindran
- Starring: Prabhu Deva; Tamannaah Bhatia; Nandita Swetha; Dimple Hayathi; Kovai Sarala
- Cinematography: Ayananka Bose
- Edited by: Anthony
- Music by: Sam C. S.
- Production companies: Trident Arts; GV Films; Abhishek Pictures
- Distributed by: Screen Scene Media Entertainment
- Release date: 31 May 2019
- Running time: 126 minutes
- Country: India
- Languages: Tamil; Telugu

Devi 2 (stylized as Devi+2) is a 2019 Indian Tamil-language comedy horror film co-written and directed by Vijay. It is a sequel to the 2016 film Devi. The film features Prabhu Deva and Tamannaah Bhatia reprising their roles from the first film, along with Nandita Swetha and Dimple Hayathi (in her Tamil debut) in the lead roles. Kovai Sarala, Ajmal Ameer, RJ Balaji and Saptagiri play supporting roles. The film was simultaneously shot in Telugu as Abhinetri 2 (transl. Actress 2). The film released on 31 May 2019.

== Plot ==
2 years after the events of the first film, Krishna and his wife, Devi are shown living happily with their daughter. While Krishna is possessed by Ruby as he went out for work while seeing her nameplate, he requested Devi to pull him inside. They arrive in Mauritius for Krishna's work, leaving their daughter with Devi's parents. As the story moves, Devi meets with Lawyer Lalitha. They became friends that night. Krishna wakes up and closes the door, which was open, but it opens again suddenly. Next, Devi becomes suspicious of Krishna because a colleague hugged him. She makes this as an issue and asks him to promise on their daughter's photo to which he says that it is casual and that he will not make a big deal out of it. Again, in the middle of the night, Krishna wakes up and closes the door, but the door suddenly opens after he left.

The next day, Devi sees Krishna (aka Alex) with Sara and again became suspicious of Krishna. She asks him about it, but he replied that it was someone else and that he was at his office, and if there is any doubt about him, she can visit him there. On his way to his office, Krishna encounters a gang who warns him not to follow Sara. Again, in the middle of the night, Krishna wakes up and closes the door, but the door suddenly opens after he left. The next day was their wedding anniversary, but Krishna seems to have forgotten it, so Devi was angry and did not give him lunch. After some time, Lalitha convinces Devi, so they both went to Krishna's office, where he was not there. On their way they again, they spot Krishna (aka Ranga) with Eesha. Lalitha mistakes Krishna going behind a girl because Devi does not have time for him after their childbirth, so Devi wears a modern dress to impress him, but he mistakes it as Ruby (from the previous film Devi(l)). However, Krishna finds that it is Devi and tells her that he likes her as she is and loves her only and that no woman will be in his life except her. He even promises on her daughter's photo.

The couple goes out the next day as it was Sunday, where Krishna goes to buy ice cream but suddenly, Devi sees him (Alex) with Sara again. The gang come to beat Krishna, but he escapes and is later seen with Eesha. The gang tries to beat Krishna (Ranga), but he gained the upper hand. While running behind a gang member, Krishna comes behind Devi with ice cream. Devi decides to find what is the mystery. Next, we see Devi speaking with Eesha's father where she finds out about Ranga Reddy, a man who wanted to marry Eesha but died in a car accident and she hasn't been able to recover her loss. Devi then starts following Sara, where it is shown that the latter is in a band whose head is Rudra. Devi learns about Alex Britto, who loves Sara but died. Again, we see the door being opened. Krishna closes it, but Devi, who was still awake, follows him and he calls out to Alex and Ranga saying that he came. Devi then becomes terrified.

The next morning, Devi asks Krishna to urgently leave Mauritius as her mother was sick, but it backfired as they are believed to have flown from India to Mauritius by the spirit in Krishna's body. On reaching the airport counter in Mauritius again Devi encounters the same people and on their flight to India, Krishna (Ranga and Alex) disappears, and Devi is confused, is taken back to their home in Mauritius. Later Lalita visits Devi and finds her to be under the control of the ghost.

The two ghosts forcefully made an agreement with her with Lalitha as the witness and forcefully make her to sign the contract. The two ghosts say that they chose Krishna because of Ruby's recommendation. On the first day, both Alex and Ranga possess him, which creates confusion, so Devi made a new agreement which states that from 9 AM to 3 PM, Alex can use him; from 3 PM to 9 PM, Ranga can use him; and when both of their girls who they try to woo say, "I love you", they have to leave him alone; and Sundays are holidays. We then come to know that there is a concert happening on Monday.

Devi and Lalitha help the ghost to woo their girls respectively by cooking up stories that they were the same girls whom his brother loved and he is now mentally unstable because both their lovers died and ask the girls to say "I love you" so that he can return to his normal state. At last, the girls decide to say it, but then Ganesan / Ganesh comes and ruins everything. The next day was Sunday. When the couple went out, they see Eesha and Sara talking to Krishna, where the girls (who are apparently sisters) learn that Krishna is not a crazy person and has been lying to them. A confused Krishna goes to his home with Devi where they are kidnapped, and it is revealed that Rudra is behind it and that he wanted to marry both of them for their money and that he killed both Ranga and Alex.

Alex/Ranga then escapes and tries to kill Rudra. Devi tries to stop him. Meanwhile, Lalitha meets Eesha and asks her to say, "I love you", and Rudra meets Sara and asks her to say, "I love you". On Krishna's way to kill Rudra, Devi begs him, to which Alex pushes her, and she cries suddenly. Raj Khanna lifts her. It is revealed that he is the chief guest, and suddenly, a flashback rolls to the first film where he tells Krishna that if she cries, he will kill him as she resembles Ruby. Raj angrily follows Krishna to shoot him as he thinks he violate his warning, and both ladies convey that they do not love Krishna. Eesha loves Ranga, and Sara loves Alex. Both ghosts leave his body. However, Rudra spots Krishna and Raj. Both of them follow Krishna to kill him but mistakenly, Raj shoots Rudra instead of Krishna, and Krishna and Devi reconcile. Rudra survived the gunshot but loses his memory. At the final scene, we see that they both are leaving Mauritius, where Devi still has Ruby's nameplate.

== Cast ==
- Prabhu Deva as Krishna Kumar alias Alex Britto alias Ranga Reddy
- Tamannaah Bhatia as Devi
- Nandita Swetha as Sara
- Dimple Hayathi as Eesha
- Kovai Sarala as Lalitha
- RJ Balaji as Ganesh (Tamil version)
- Saptagiri as Buchi (Telugu version)
- Ajmal Ameer as Rudhra
- Arjai as Victor

Cameo appearance

- Sonu Sood as Raj Khanna

== Production ==
A. L. Vijay announced a sequel of Devi and the lead cast Tamannaah Bhatia, Prabhu Deva, Sonu Sood, RJ Balaji, and Saptagiri reprising their roles.

== Music ==
This film's soundtrack is composed by Sam C. S., replacing the predecessor film's music directors. While the lyrics for Tamil version of the film are written by Na. Muthukumar, Madhan Karky, Arunraja Kamaraj and Prabhu Deva, the lyrics for Telugu version of the film are written by Ramajogayya Sastry and Vanamali. The song "Chal Maar" is reused from the first part.

=== Tamil version ===
Devi 2

Soundtrack album by Sam C. S.
- Released: 2019
- Genre: Soundtrack
- Length: 15:07
- Label: Muzik 247
- Producer: Sam C. S.

Sam C. S. chronology
Ayogya (2019)	Devi 2 (2019)	Gorilla (2019)

No.	Title	Lyrics	Singer(s)	Length
1.	"Chal Maar (reused by Sajid–Wajid)"	Na. Muthukumar (reused from part 1)	Benny Dayal, Blaaze	4:19
2.	"Sokkura Penne"	Arunraja Kamaraj	Shankar Mahadevan	4:10
3.	"Love, Love Me"	Madhan Karky	Sam C. S.	3:38
4.	"Ready Ready"	Prabhu Deva	Nincy Vincent	3:00
Total length:				15:07

=== Telugu version ===
No.	Title	Lyrics	Singer(s)	Length
1.	"Chal Maar (reused by Sajid–Wajid)"	Ramajogayya Sastry(reused from part 1)	Nakash Aziz	4:19
2.	"Love, Love Me"	Ramajogayya Sastry	Sam C. S.	3:38
3.	"Chakkani Pilla"	Ramajogayya Sastry	Diwakar	4:10
4.	"Ready Ready"	Vanamali	Nincy Vincent	2:34
Total length:				14:41

== Reception ==
The film released to negative reviews unlike the first film.
