= Jerry-Jane Pears =

English actress, dancer and model

Jerry-Jane Pears is an English actress, dancer, and model.

Born in Leicester, England, Pears was spotted for modeling aged 16 at The Clothes Show Live and has featured in campaigns, magazines, music videos and commercials. She passed A-Levels in politics, French and philosophy and achieved a BA Honours Degree and Diploma in Theatre and Dancing.

Jerry-Jane was cast as Princess Maribel in the American TV show The Royals. She played 'Jayne Mansfield' in BBC Drama 'Babs' and 'Florrie' for Fox/ITV 'Houdini and Doyle'. Jerry-Jane was cast as the lead female, 'Stephanie Crane' in British feature film, 'Boogie Man' in 2017. Jerry-Jane is currently the face of Australian brand, 'Honey Birdette' Campaign.

Pears has danced for artists including Ariana Grande, Little Mix and Olly Murs and for brands like Adidas, Wella, and Dolce & Gabbana. She has performed on shows including MTV/EMA Awards, The Brits, and X-Factor.

Pears featured in Vikings S06 E16 (December 2020) as Goddess Idun (the Goddess blessed with eternal youth).
