= Anthony (film editor) =

Indian film editor from Tamil Nadu

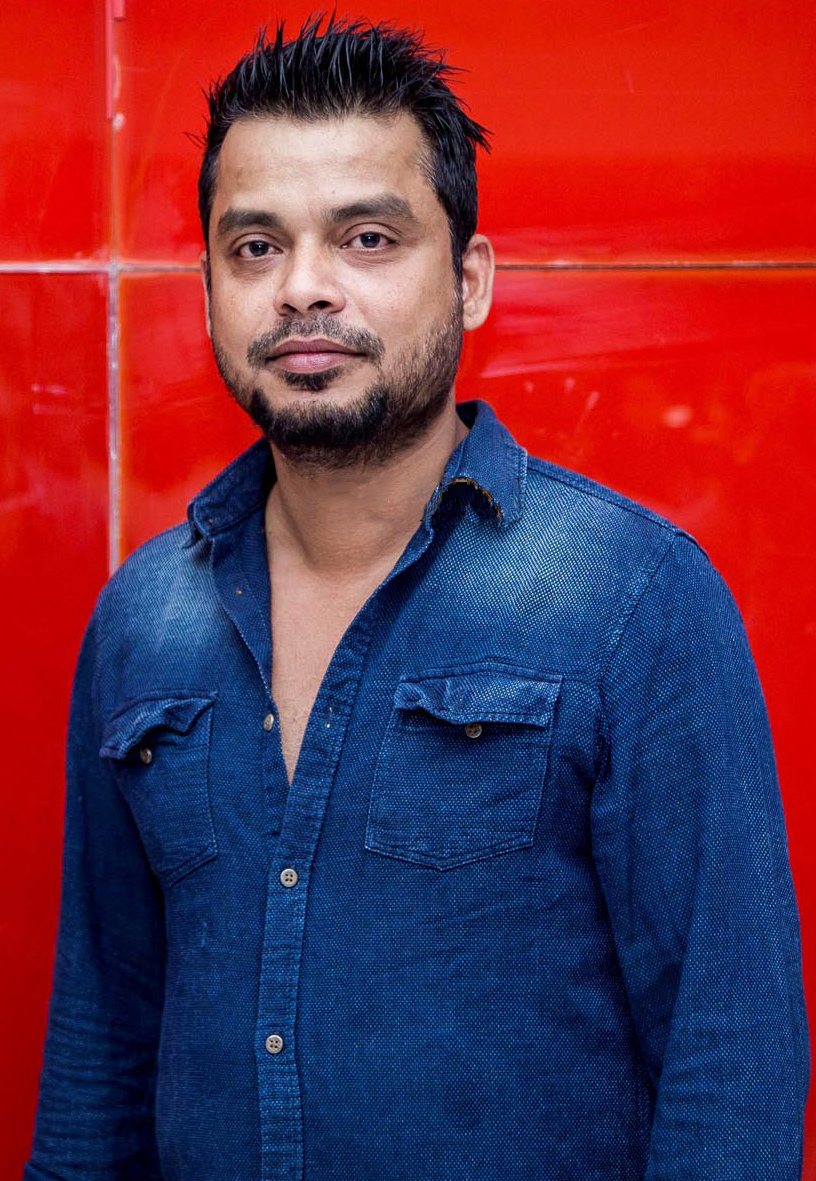
- Born: Llewellyn Anthony Gonsalvez; 11 September 1973 (age 52); T. Nagar, Chennai, Tamil Nadu, India
- Occupations: Film editor and director
- Years active: 2003–present
- Honours: Kalaimamani 2020

Llewellyn Anthony Gonsalvez (born 11 September 1973) is an Indian film editor from Tamil Nadu. He was introduced to cinema through film director Gautham Vasudev Menon by the film Kaakha Kaakha (2003). He continued to collaborated with Gautham V. Menon by Vettaiyaadu Vilaiyaadu (2006), Pachaikili Muthucharam (2007), Vaaranam Aayiram (2008), Vinnaithaandi Varuvaayaa (2010), Neethaane En Ponvasantham (2012), Yennai Arindhaal (2015), Achcham Yenbadhu Madamaiyada (2016) and Vendhu Thanindhathu Kaadu (2022). Following the success of these films, director Shankar has collaborated with him through Enthiran (2010). He has worked in over two-hundred Tamil, Malayalam, Telugu, Hindi and Kannada films. He is the editor for India's most expensive feature film 2.0 (2018).

== Career ==
Anthony studied a degree in literature at Madras Christian College, Tambaram, but found himself unsure of a career path once he has finished his education. Following suggestions from his friends, he began learning about animation at Prasad Studio and subsequently also enrolled to learn about editing. He thereafter, received offers to work on corporate ads, trailers and documentaries from 1993 for Edit Point and continued to work in the same practice till 2004, often collaborating with leading ad film makers like Rajiv Menon. He then began to work on editing songs in films occasionally, also gaining experience by editing tele-films. Director Gautham Vasudev Menon asked Anthony to edit the song "Ennai Konjam" in Kaakha Kaakha for the audio release event of that film. Impressed with his work for that song, he asked him to sign on as the film's editor. He has since associated with major directors in Tamil cinema, collaborating regularly with directors including Shankar, AR Murugadoss, Gautham Vasudev Menon, Linguswamy, K. V. Anand and A. L. Vijay.

Anthony has also nurtured an ambition to direct films and began pre-production on a comedy film titled Jagathalapradhaban in November 2008 featuring Jayaram, Yuhi Sethu and Namitha. The film, however failed to take off. Anthony revealed in August 2014 that he was set to make his first film, and it would be the remake of the Malayalam film Shutter (2012). In November 2014, he announced and began work on the venture featuring Sathyaraj in the lead role. The film also stars Anumol, Kalyani Natarajan and Dixitha Kothari.

== Filmography ==
Year	Film	Language	Notes
2003	Kaakha Kaakha	Tamil	
2003	Madhurey	Tamil	
2003	Mullavalliyum Thenmavum	Malayalam	
2004	New	Tamil	
2004	Gharshana	Telugu	
2004	Manmadhan	Tamil	
2004	4 The People	Malayalam	Kerala State Film Award for Best Editor
2005	Soggadu	Telugu	
2005	Thotti Jaya	Tamil	
2005	Daas	Tamil	
2005	Anbe Aaruyire	Tamil	
2005	Ghajini	Tamil	
2005	Mazhai	Tamil	
2006	Happy	Telugu	
2006	Thirupathi	Tamil	
2006	Cyanide	Kannada	
2006	Vettaiyaadu Vilaiyaadu	Tamil	
2006	Sillunu Oru Kaadhal	Tamil	Role as an Automobile Engineer
2006	Stalin	Telugu	
2006	Vallavan	Tamil	
2007	Pachaikili Muthucharam	Tamil	
2007	Sivaji: The Boss	Tamil	Nominated, Vijay Award for Best Editor
2007	Kireedam	Tamil	
2007	Azhagiya Tamil Magan	Tamil	
2007	Oram Po	Tamil	
2008	Bheema	Tamil	
2008	Minchina Ota	Kannada	
2008	Satyam	Tamil	
2008	Vaaranam Aayiram	Tamil	Nominated, Vijay Award for Best Editor
2008	Ghajini	Hindi	
2009	Ayan	Tamil	
2009	Renigunta	Tamil	Nominated, Vijay Award for Best Editor
2010	Aasal	Tamil	
2010	Vinnaithaandi Varuvaayaa; Ye Maaya Chesaave	Tamil; Telugu	
2010	Police Quarters	Kannada	
2010	Varudu	Telugu	
2010	Paiyaa	Tamil	
2010	Simha	Telugu	
2010	Madrasapattinam	Tamil	
2010	Moscowin Kavery	Tamil	
2010	Enthiran	Tamil	
2010	Va	Tamil	
2011	Nadunisi Naaygal	Tamil	
2011	Veppam	Tamil	
2011	Ko	Tamil	Cameo appearance as "Malar TV editor"
2011	Engeyum Kadhal	Tamil	
2011	Vaanam	Tamil	
2011	Deiva Thirumagal	Tamil	
2011	7 Aum Arivu	Tamil	
2012	Vettai	Tamil	
2012	Nanban	Tamil	
2012	Ek Deewana Tha	Hindi	
2012	18 Vayasu	Tamil	
2012	Podaa Podi	Tamil	
2012	Thaandavam	Tamil	
2012	Maattrraan	Tamil	
2012	Neethane En Ponvasantham; Yeto Vellipoyindhi Manasu	Tamil; Telugu	
2013	Attahasa	Kannada	
2013	Thalaivaa	Tamil	
2013	Aadhalal Kadhal Seiveer	Tamil	
2013	Pandiya Naadu	Tamil	Vijay Award for Best Editor
2013	Apple Penne	Tamil	
2014	Inga Enna Solluthu	Tamil	Cameo appearance as "Anthony"
2014	Goli Soda	Tamil	
2014	Thalaivan	Tamil	
2014	Kochadaiiyaan	Tamil	
2014	Saivam	Tamil	
2014	Anjaan	Tamil	
2014	Kappal	Tamil	
2015	I	Tamil	
2015	Yennai Arindhaal	Tamil	
2015	Anegan	Tamil	
2015	Romeo Juliet	Tamil	
2015	Idhu Enna Maayam	Tamil	
2015	Paayum Puli	Tamil	
2015	Oru Naal Iravil	Tamil	Also director
2015	Vellaiya Irukiravan Poi Solla Maatan	Tamil	
2016	Pencil	Tamil	
2016	Vaaimai	Tamil	
2016	Devi	Tamil; Telugu; Hindi	
2016	Achcham Yenbadhu Madamaiyada; Sahasam Swasaga Sagipo	Tamil; Telugu	
2017	Bogan	Tamil	
2017	Kavan	Tamil	Cameo appearance as "wineshop guy"
2017	Vanamagan	Tamil	
2017	Sakka Podu Podu Raja	Tamil	
2018	Diya	Tamil	Cameo appearance as Psychiatrist Dr. Anthony Gonsalvez
2018	Lakshmi	Tamil	
2018	2.0	Tamil	
2019	Sarvam Thaala Mayam	Tamil	
2019	LKG	Tamil	
2019	90ML	Tamil	
2019	Devi 2	Tamil	
2019	Kennedy Club	Tamil	
2019	Kaappaan	Tamil	acted as special appearance
2020	Putham Pudhu Kaalai	Tamil	Amazon Prime Video anthology film Segment: Avarum Naanum – Avalum Naanum
2021	Kutty Story	Tamil	
2021	Eeswaran	Tamil	
2021	Navarasa	Tamil	Netflix anthology series Segment: Guitar Kambi Mele Nindru
2021	Kasada Thapara	Tamil	Streaming release; "Akkarai" segment
2021	Thalaivii	Tamil	
2022	Yaanai	Tamil	
2022	Vendhu Thanindhadhu Kaadu	Tamil	
2022	Nitham Oru Vaanam	Tamil	
2022–2023	Jhansi	Telugu	Television series
2023	Boo	Tamil; Telugu	
2023	Rudhran	Tamil	
2023	Bommai	Tamil	
2023	Chandramukhi 2	Tamil	
2023	Makka Makka	Tamil	An independent music video with music by Harris Jayaraj, vocals by Sathyaprakash & Bamba Bakya, lyrics penned by Pa. Vijay
2024	Mission: Chapter 1	Tamil	
2024	Joshua Imai Pol Kaakha	Tamil	
2024	Idi Minnal Kadhal	Tamil	
2025	Dominic and the Ladies' Purse	Malayalam	
2025	Kannappa	Telugu	
2025	Kaantha	Tamil	
2025	Retta Thala	Tamil	
2026	Kadhal Reset Repeat	Tamil	
TBA	Dhruva Natchathiram	Tamil	Awaiting release
