= Madrasapattinam =

2010 Tamil period film directed by A. L. Vijay

- Theatrical release poster
- Directed by: Vijay
- Written by: Vijay
- Produced by: Kalpathi S. Aghoram
- Starring: Arya; Amy Jackson
- Cinematography: Nirav Shah
- Edited by: Anthony Gonsalvez
- Music by: G. V. Prakash Kumar
- Production company: AGS Entertainment
- Distributed by: Red Giant Movies
- Release date: 9 July 2010
- Running time: 165 minutes
- Country: India
- Language: Tamil

Madrasapattinam (transl. Madras Town) is a 2010 Indian Tamil-language historical romance film written and directed by Vijay. The film stars Arya with Amy Jackson (in her feature film debut), while Carole Trangmar-Palmer plays an older version of Amy. Nassar, Cochin Hanifa, Lisa Lazarus, and Alexx O'Nell play supporting roles. Set primarily in the 1940s during the British Raj, it revolves around a British woman falling in love with an Indian man, but they face threats from a sadistic British officer who is her suitor.

Madrasapattinam was produced by Kalpathi S. Aghoram of AGS Entertainment. The music was composed by G. V. Prakash Kumar with editing by Anthony and cinematography by Nirav Shah. The film was released on 9 July 2010 and became a box office success.

== Plot ==
An elderly English woman named Amy Wilkinson, almost at her deathbed in London due to a blood clot caused by a past head injury, wants to come down to Madras in search of a man named Ilamparithi (aka Parithi), whom she last saw on 15 August 1947. She wishes to return a thali belonging to his mother, which he gave her as a sign that she belongs to India and nobody can separate them. However, after a turn of events, she had married another man from her hometown and thus felt that the thali was no longer her property.

Amy arrives in Madras with her granddaughter Catherine, equipped only with a picture of Parithi that was taken 60 years ago. Amy questions various people about Parithi's whereabouts. In the process, she recalls the events when she had first visited Madras, and the chain of events that took place.

A young Amy, the daughter of the Madras Presidency Governor, George Wilkinson, visits Chennai (then called Madras, with the Chennai District being called Madrasapattinam) along with her translator Nambi and encounters Parithi, whom she calls a "brave man". Parithi, a member of the dhobi (washermen) clan, is also an experienced wrestler who trains under Ayyakanu. He openly opposes the British officials who attempt to build a golf course in the dhobi clan's dwelling place. He challenges a sadistic and racist officer named Robert Ellis, who is also Amy's suitor, to a wrestling match to decide the fate of his clan's home. Parithi wins, and Robert vows revenge.

In between this, the scene shifts to the present day where the aged Amy, who is going around Chennai looking for Parithi, starts remembering the olden days. She and Catherine go in a taxi driven by Veerasekhara Murali and his assistant. They track down an old woman named Selvi (as Parithi's sister's name was Selvi) in hopes that she is Parithi's sister, but it turns out that she is not the person whom they were looking for. Catherine suggests that they go to the Census Office to identify Parithi. Murali then gives an idea of painting Parithi as he would look now. They go meet a painter who gets drunk with the money they gave. When the painter's wife sees his drunken stupor, she furiously throws old frames, and Amy identifies one of them to be a photo taken by her. They track down the owner of the image (ChennaiImages.com), which is actually a shooting spot for dramas. They meet the manager, and he says that the pictures were bought in an auction years ago. After they leave, his wife asks him why he lied about the images that his grandfather had saved. Later, it is shown that the man is Nambi's grandson.

Later, Amy falls ill while at her room and is rushed to the hospital. There she meets Parithi's friend Kabir in his deathbed. When she inquires about Parithi's whereabouts to Kabir in Tamil, Murali and his assistant get shocked. Kabir breathes his last, saying only the words "Durai Amma", following which he dies soon after. When Murali asks Amy about her knowledge in Tamil and why she did not speak it before, Amy blankly stares at the Cooum River and narrates her younger days to the three of them.

Following a series of secret meetings between Parithi and Amy, love blossoms between them, and Parithi affectionately calls her "Durai Amma" (lady/female lord), a polite term of addressing British women. However, a major threat comes in the form of independence for India on 15 August 1947, which means that all British officials and their families, including Amy, would have to leave India. On the eve of independence, all of India is celebrating. However, Amy and Parithi, determined to be together, run away and are hunted by an angry Robert and his men. An Indian policeman helps the two of them by hiding them in a clock tower on top of the Madras Central Railway Station, but they are discovered by Robert. After a fierce fight, Robert is killed, Amy is injured in her head, and Parithi is badly wounded. Amy helps Parithi escape by casting him with a life-raft into the Cooum River, before she is captured and taken back to London. She had never known if Parithi survived or what his fate was.

Back in the present day, Amy is urgently called back to London to have a life-saving operation. However, she is determined to find Parithi and by chance encounters a taxi driver who mentions Durai Ammal Foundation to her. She asks him to take her there and he does, assuming she would want to donate. The driver shows her around the foundation, which has organisations providing free housing for orphans and the elderly, medical care, and affordable education (all of which were promised to the dhobi children by the young Amy several years ago). She realises that the Durai Ammal Foundation was established by Parithi and named after her.

Then, when Amy asks the driver what happened to Parithi, he leads her to his tomb and reveals that he died 12 years ago. She kneels before the tomb and claims the thali as her own, declaring that it is hers before quietly dying on Parithi's tomb. Catherine mourns for her, and the driver is dumbfounded to learn that the old woman was "Durai Amma" herself. The epilogue shows Parithi and Amy, as they were in their youth, in the afterlife.

== Cast ==
- Arya as Ilamparithi aka Parithi
- Amy Jackson as Amy Wilkinson / 'Durai Amma' (voiceover by Andrea Jeremiah)
  - Carole Trangmar-Palmer as Older Amy Wilkinson
- Nassar as Ayyakanu
- Cochin Haneefa as Nambi
- Alexx O'Nell as Robert Ellis
- Lisa Lazarus as Catherine
- M. S. Bhaskar as Vengappan
- Bala Singh as Duraisamy
- Omar Lateef as Kabir
- N. L. Srinivasan as Karna
- Sathish as Pacha
- M. R. Kishore Kumar as Rengan
- Elango Kumaravel as Taxi Driver
- Balaji Venugopal as Veerasekhara Murali
- Lollu Sabha Jeeva as Murali's assistant
- Jack James as Governor George Wilkinson
- George Maryan as English Teacher
- Appukutty as Kaali
- Sampath Ram as Anbazhagan
- Leema Babu as Selvi
- Loveday Smith as George's wife
- Jayakumar as Nambi's grandson
- Ajayan Bala as Chennai Central Station Master
- Nicholas as DSP
- Gary Tantony as Golf Grounds Engineer
- Mike Parish as The Reverend M. Smith
- Matthieu Bellon as British Officer
- Neelu Nasreen
- T. M. Karthik as Painter (uncredited)

== Production ==
=== Development ===
Director A. L. Vijay revealed that Madrasapattinam was supposed to happen later in his career, but the intervention of producer Kalpathi S. Aghoram helped realise the viability of the film earlier. Vijay had first explored the script in his college days and drew inspiration from an English professor who "used to talk to us about the freedom movement a lot", furthering Vijay's interest in history. He visualised the people who lived in the pre-independence period of India and explored the concept of how it would have been if an English girl fell in love with an Indian boy, laying the foundations for the script. Vijay wrote the script in six months and also met leading Tamil writer Prapanchan regarding his inputs for the script.

After the release of Poi Solla Porom in September 2008, Vijay began researching on the script. Since the team had only few references of how the city of Madras between 1945 and 1947 had looked like, with only black and white images and no film footages during that time, Vijay had met independence veterans journalist S. Muthiah, painter-writer Manohar Devadoss and Ramasamy, a personal assistant of C. Rajagopalachari, to provide their inputs on how the city looked during that period while also having his associate directors to collect images and photographs from The Hindu (through the specific column "Memories of Madras"), Kalki and Ananda Vikatan. Some of the novels, such as P. Rajaraman's Chennai Through The Ages and Muthiah's Madras Rediscovered and Madras — the Past and the Present helped them for the research. The team had prepared the complete storyboard to envision the authenticity of the pre-Independence period being replicated.

=== Casting ===
Vijay chose to make the protagonist as a dhobi and wrestler as "when the British came to India, they depended heavily on cooks and dhobis wherever they were" and in Madras the dhobis lived in the same area the Britishers were residing, which was now called Vannarapettai. As Vijay "wanted someone who looked good and would be attractive for a rich British girl", he initially asked Mahesh Babu to play the lead role but could not accept it. Hence, Arya was chosen for the male lead role. The team conducted a photoshoot with him in the periodic costumes and felt he was convincing for the character Ilamparithi. Arya gained a lot of weight and underwent extensive training sessions to play the role of a wrestler.

English Miss Teen World winner Amy Jackson was selected after Vijay found a picture of her on the Internet and tracked her down. It is her acting debut. Arya told Sankaran Malini of The New Indian Express that he was amazed by Jackson's professionalism and her commitment to weather, adding "This being her first film ever and coming down from a city like London, adjusting to the climate here was a big challenge for her. I remember she nearly fainted because of the sultry weather. But she never complained and took her scenes seriously. She truly is the soul of the film." Jackson further stated that Arya had provided her the guidance and advice she needed while preparing for the role.

The film also featured numerous Indian and foreign artists. American actor Alexx O'Nell made his South Indian film debut playing the antagonist Robert Ellis. Madrasapattinam was Cochin Haneefa's posthumous film role, as he died in February 2010, before the film's release. Sathish made his film debut in a minor role.

=== Filming and design ===
Filming for Madrasapattinam began in March 2009 after extensive pre-production and storyboarding being completed. Art director V. Selvakumar replicated several locations via sets, such as Chennai Central railway station, Mount Road, the areas of Vannarapettai, and other locations to reflect the film's periodic setting. They also used sets to shoot the interior sequences. Nirav Shah who handled the cinematography went through wide angle shots, as per Vijay's suggestion and some scenes were filmed in 360 degrees. A set resembling Delhi was erected at Mysore to maintain the authenticity of the events happening in the pre-Independence era.

Arya recalled that the pre-climax portion happening on the eve before India got its independence from the British (14 August 1947) was coincidentally shot on the same date in 2009, which they "did not plan it, it just happened that way". The film was finished in eight months, as according to Vijay, most period films might take two years; he credited his mentor Priyadarshan as the reason for the meticulous planning.

=== Visual effects ===
The visual effects of the film were provided by EyeCube. Nearly 22 minutes of visual effects were incorporated for replicating the 1940s era of the landmark locations in Chennai. These sequences had nearly cost around ₹6 crore (equivalent to ₹15 crore or US$1.6 million in 2026).

== Soundtrack ==
Vijay approached Harris Jayaraj as music composer first, but out of his call sheets, Vijay chose G. V. Prakash Kumar as music composer. The soundtrack of Madrasapattinam was released on 4 April 2010. Lyrics were written by Na. Muthukumar. The song "Pookkal Pookkum Tharunam" is set in Darbari Kanada, a Hindustani raga, while "Aaruyire" is set in Charukesi, a Carnatic raga. "Vaama Duraiyamma" includes English dialogue by Haneefa and Jackson, the former translating the Tamil lyrics (sung by Udit Narayan) for the latter.

Tamil track list

All lyrics are written by Na. Muthukumar; all music is composed by G. V. Prakash Kumar.

No.	Title	Singer(s)	Length
1.	"Pookkal Pookkum"	Harini, Roopkumar Rathod, Andrea Jeremiah, G. V. Prakash Kumar	6:37
2.	"Vaama Duraiyamma"	Udit Narayan, Cochin Haneefa, Amy Jackson	4:47
3.	"Feel Of Love"	Navin Iyer, Seenu	3:42
4.	"Meghame O Meghame"	M. S. Viswanathan, Vikram, Nassar	6:05
5.	"Aaruyire"	Sonu Nigam, Saindhavi	6:12
6.	"Kaatrile"	Hariharan, Zia	4:45
7.	"The Dance Theme"	Navin Iyer	1:33
Total length:			33:41

Telugu tracklist

No.	Title	Lyrics	Singer(s)	Length
1.	"Meghama"	Sahithi	Manikka Vinayagam, Tippu	6:02
2.	"Meghama" (Instrumental)			1:26
3.	"O Prema"	Sahithi	Sonu Nigam, Saindhavi	6:10
4.	"O Prema" (Instrumental)			3:37
5.	"Poolu Pooyu"	Chandrabose	Roopkumar Rathod, Harini	6:40
6.	"Ramma Dorasani"	Chandrabose	Udit Narayan	4:52
7.	"Swechage"	Chandrabose	Haricharan	4:44
Total length:				33:31

== Release ==
Madrasapattinam was released on 9 July 2010, by Red Giant Movies.

== Reception ==
=== Critical response ===
Sify stated that the film was a "brave attempt on the part of its makers". Pavithra Srinivasan of Rediff.com wrote, "Madharasapattinam serves up an almost flawless exhibition of the city as it was, in 1947 with its painstaking attention to detail. For all the irritants, though, this Titanic of Madras is still worth a watch". Malathi Rangarajan of The Hindu also gave a positive review.

=== Box office ===
The film opened at No. 1 at the Chennai box office. Its opening was described by Sify as "above average", but by early September the film, despite being at No. 5 at the Chennai box office, had become a success which Sify attributed to "publicity boost" and favourable word-of-mouth.

== Accolades ==
Event	Category	Recipient(s)	Verdict	Ref.
8th Filmfare Awards South	Best Film – Tamil	Madrasapattinam	Nominated	
8th Filmfare Awards South	Best Director – Tamil	A. L. Vijay	Nominated	
8th Filmfare Awards South	Best Actor – Tamil	Arya	Nominated	
8th Filmfare Awards South	Best Supporting Actress – Tamil	Carole Palmer	Nominated	
8th Filmfare Awards South	Best Music Director – Tamil	G. V. Prakash Kumar	Nominated	
8th Filmfare Awards South	Best Male Playback Singer – Tamil	Udit Narayan for "Vaama Duraiyamma"	Nominated	
8th Filmfare Awards South	Best Lyricist – Tamil	Na. Muthukumar	Nominated	
5th Vijay Awards	Best Costume Designer	Deepali Noor	Won	
5th Vijay Awards	Best Art Director	Selvakumar	Won	
Edison Awards	Best Director	A. L. Vijay	Won	
Edison Awards	Best Music Director	G. V. Prakash Kumar	Won	

== See also ==
- List of historical films set in Asia
