= Idhu Enna Maayam =

2015 Indian film by A. L. Vijay

- Theatrical release poster
- Directed by: Vijay
- Written by: Vijay
- Produced by: R. Sarathkumar; Radikaa; Listin Stephen
- Starring: Vikram Prabhu; Keerthy Suresh
- Cinematography: Nirav Shah
- Edited by: Anthony
- Music by: G. V. Prakash Kumar
- Production companies: Magic Frames; Think Big Studios
- Release date: 31 July 2015
- Country: India
- Language: Tamil

Idhu Enna Maayam (transl. What magic is this?) is a 2015 Indian Tamil-language romantic comedy film written and directed by Vijay and produced by R. Sarathkumar, Radikaa and Listin Stephen under the production banner of Magic Frames. The film stars Vikram Prabhu and Keerthy Suresh (in her Tamil debut), while Kavya Shetty has a supporting role. G. V. Prakash Kumar composed the music. The film was released on 31 July 2015. It was reported to be inspired by the 2010 South Korean film Cyrano Agency, itself based on Edmond Rostand's play Cyrano de Bergerac.

== Plot ==
Arun is a struggling theatre artist. With the help of his friends, who are also struggling theatre artists, he starts a website called UMT (Unnal Mudiyum Thambi; transl. You can do it, brother) which helps men struggling in love successfully unite with the woman of their dreams with the help of theatrics. One day, UMT gets a rich client in the form of Santhosh, the owner of a real estate company. Santhosh is in love with a singer named Maya and offers ₹1,00,00,000 if Arun and his friends can help him win Maya's heart. Arun has second thoughts over the offer because Maya is his ex-girlfriend. They had broken up due to a serious misunderstanding between them. Though he still has feelings for Maya, he reluctantly agrees to help Santhosh. However, he foils all the plans to bring Santhosh and Maya together. A frustrated Santhosh then directly proposes to Maya, but she rejects him as she has still not forgotten Arun. In the end, it is revealed that Santhosh and Arun's friends knew about Arun's love for Maya, and with her help, they deliberately made all the plans to unite Santhosh and Maya fail so that Arun and Maya can get back together. Arun realises his mistake and declares his love for Maya, thus rekindling their romance.

== Cast ==
- Vikram Prabhu as Arun
- Keerthy Suresh as Maya
- Kavya Shetty as Pallavi
- Nassar as Arun's father
- Ambika as Arun's mother
- RJ Balaji as Arun's friend
- Parvathi T as Maya's mother
- Jeeva Ravi as Maya's father
- Charle as the father of Arun's friend
- Luthfudeen Baashaa as Venky
- Lollu Sabha Jeeva as Shaji
- Balaji Venugopal as Bharath
- Aditi Ravi as Nithya
- Manobala as Professor
- RJ Ajai as Karthik
- Vishal Verma as Maya's friend
- Abishek Joseph George as Maya's friend
- Pawan Alex
- Atul
- Kumaran Thangarajan
- Milton Raju
- Sudakshina Sivakumar
- Dixitha Kothari
- Vidhya
- Ammu Abhirami
- Gayathri Raghuram as a dance choreographer
- Navdeep as Santhosh (extended cameo appearance)

Idhu Enna Maayam

Soundtrack album by G. V. Prakash Kumar
- Released: 6 April 2015
- Venue: 2014-15
- Genre: Feature film soundtrack
- Length: 22:30
- Language: Tamil
- Label: Sony Music Entertainment India
- Producer: G. V. Prakash Kumar

G. V. Prakash Kumar chronology
Komban (2015)	Idhu Enna Maayam (2015)	Kaaval (2015)

== Production ==
The collaboration between the producers, director A. L. Vijay and Vikram Prabhu was first revealed in July 2014, when the director noted he had finished writing the script for a romantic film to be shot in Chennai. In August 2014, Malayali actress Keerthy Suresh was brought in to play the female lead role, thus making her debut in Tamil films. Kavya Shetty, who had previously featured in Kannada films, also joined the cast later that month and participated in a workshop to get into her character of a college girl in the flashback sequences. The film progressed without a title until December 2014, when director Vijay revealed that the film would be titled as Idu Enna Maayam. The title is derived from a song from Oram Po (2007). Filming wrapped in early February 2015.

== Soundtrack ==
The music is composed by G. V. Prakash Kumar and all lyrics are by Na. Muthukumar except for "High Volatage" by MC Vickey.

Track listing
No.	Title	Singer(s)	Length
1.	"High Voltage"	MC Vickey
2.	"Iravaaga Nee"	G. V. Prakash Kumar & Saindhavi
3.	"Machi Machi"	Udit Narayan, Devan Ekambaram, Navin Iyer
4.	"Irukkirai"	G. V. Prakash Kumar, Harini
5.	"Sutrum Boomi Maele"	Shireen Shahana
6.	"A Walk To Remember"	Theme

== Release ==
Idhu Enna Maayam was released on 31 July 2015. The film had its television premiere on 29 November the same year via Sun TV.

== Reception ==
S. Saraswathi of Rediff.com wrote, "Director Vijay’s Idhu Enna Maayam may lack the passion and originality of his previous films, but does make a decent entertainer". Anupama Subramanian of Deccan Chronicle wrote, "Director Vijay, known for his earlier clean feel-good flicks, has travelled in a tried and tested plot, which offers nothing new in this rom-com" although she praised the cinematography. Jyothi Prabhakar of The Times of India wrote, "The trick is to see the film for what it is – a full-of-clichés breezy romcom". Sify wrote, "[Idhu Enna Maayam] is a template romantic drama with slow paced screenplay garnished with beautiful cinematography".
