= Uthara Menon =

Indian costume fashion designer and entrepreneur

- Occupations: Fashion costume designer celebrity stylist
- Known for: Fashion designing

Uthara Menon is an Indian costume designer, who has worked in the Tamil, Telugu and Malayalam film industries.

== Career ==
Uthara began her career as a fashion stylist for a soft drink commercial directed by her brother Gautham Vasudev Menon featuring Asin. Gautham subsequently offered her the opportunity to work on his films, beginning with Yennai Arindhaal (2015). She has since worked with him on films including Achcham Yenbadhu Madamaiyada (2016), Enai Noki Paayum Thota (2019) and Dhruva Natchathiram (2025). In their collaborations, she notably worked on dressing Ajith Kumar as a police officer, Trisha as a bohemian dancer, and Dhanush across several different looks through time. For Trisha's character of Hemanika, Uthara made dresses out of Kanchi cottons and used retro brocade for her dance costumes, while basing her look on actress Shobana. For both projects, she won awards from film portal Behindwoods and magazine Ananda Vikatan. Uthara has also worked with Gautham on his music videos for Ondraga Originals.

Uthara has also worked as a stylist on Telugu language films, with Sye Raa Narasimha Reddy (2019) being her largest project to date. The film is set in the 1800s and features characters representing the British regiments, native villagers, tribals and zamindars of British India. She worked for over two years on the film, and styled actors including Amitabh Bachchan, Chiranjeevi and Nayanthara. She has also worked on other Telugu films such as Sarrainodu (2016) and Nani's Gang Leader (2019), while she assisted on Manam (2014) as a set designer with Rajeevan.

== Early life ==
Uthara is the sister of film director Gautham Vasudev Menon.

== Notable filmography ==
- Manam (2014)
- Yennai Arindhaal (2015)
- Achcham Yenbadhu Madamaiyada (2016)
- Sarrainodu (2016)
- Shailaja Reddy Alludu (2018)
- Ayogya (2019)
- Nani's Gang Leader (2019)
- Sye Raa Narasimha Reddy (2019)
- Action (2019)
- Enai Noki Paayum Thota (2019)
- Varane Avashyamund (2020)
- Chakra (2021)
- Joshua Imai Pol Kaakha (2021)
- Navarasa (web series) - segment;Guitar Kambi Mele Nindru (2021)
- Vendhu Thanindhathu Kaadu (2022)
- Dhruva Natchathiram (TBA)
