= Oru Naal Iravil =

2015 Indian film by Anthony

- Directed by: Anthony
- Written by: Yugi Sethu (Dialogues)
- Screenplay by: Anthony
- Story by: Joy Mathew
- Based on: Shutter by Joy Mathew
- Produced by: Vijay (Presenter); A. L. Azhagappan; Sam Paul
- Starring: Sathyaraj; Yugi Sethu
- Cinematography: M. S. Prabhu
- Edited by: Anthony
- Music by: Navin
- Production company: Paulsons Media
- Distributed by: Think Big Studios, Sri Thenandal films
- Release date: 20 November 2015
- Country: India
- Language: Tamil

Oru Naal Iravil (transl. In the night of one day) is a 2015 Indian Tamil language thriller film edited and directed by Anthony in his directorial debut. A remake of Joy Mathew's successful Malayalam film Shutter (2012), the film stars Sathyaraj in the lead role. The film is presented by Vijay and produced by A. L. Azhagappan and Sam Paul. The film opened to positive reviews on its release.

== Plot ==
Shekar is an NRI working in Singapore. He comes to his hometown Chennai after completing his contract. He sees his daughter riding a bike with a male classmate. Fearing that she would stray, he arranges for her to get married as soon as possible and ends her college education. Shekar has invested in a commercial property next to his house which he has let out to store owners, except for one garage. Since he is home, he meets his friends here and they bond every night over a few peg of drinks. One of them is Suri, a young autorickshaw driver. Around the same time, Sethu, a struggling former film director has written a script that is finally accepted by a producer. However, he leaves his bag by accident in Suri's rickshaw.

One day, Suri arranges for Shekar to rendezvous with a call girl in the unoccupied garage near his house to cheer him up after he has an argument with his family over his daughter's marriage and education. While getting some food, Suri bumps into Sethu who demands for his bag back. While traveling to get the bag, Suri is arrested by the police for driving under influence and is held at the local station for the whole night. Shekar and the call girl are left locked up in the garage for two nights in a row. During this time, Shekar convinces the call girl to remain quiet until Suri comes to get them since it would be embarrassing if anyone knows about why they are locked up there.

Shekar learns that the call girl was forced to stop college after getting married, but had to become a prostitute to feed her daughter after her husband left them. She only has one friend who she can call during emergencies, but she cannot call him now since he does not know she is a call girl. Shekar also explains that his house is nearby, which is why they cannot simply leave in broad daylight. The call girl also sees the bag with the script which Suri had left in the rickshaw. She reads the script and decides to take it with her. Meanwhile, they overhear Shekar's friends talking outside the garage and learn that one of them has ill intentions towards him.

When the coast is finally clear and Suri is released from the station, he comes to get Shekar out. However, Suri is shocked to see that the call girl had left, thinking that he had come to take her. Before leaving, she had told Shekar to call her Thangam. Suri takes the bag back to Sethu, who is shocked to see that his script is gone. Meanwhile, Shekar goes home and is welcomed by his family. It turns out that his daughter had arranged for her friend to unlock the garage. She had also realized the truth but lied to her family about her father leaving town for a few days to calm himself down. Following Thangam's advice, he calls off the engagement and allows his daughter to continue her education.

Meanwhile, Thangam goes to meet her only friend, who turns out to be Sethu. She gives him the script that she had taken, not realizing that it was originally his. Inspired by the sudden turn of events, Sethu decides to rewrite the script before directing his film.

== Cast ==
- Sathyaraj as Shekar
- Yugi Sethu as Sethu Barathi
- Anumol as Thangam
- Kalyani Natarajan as Shekar's wife
- Varun as Suri
- Dikshitha Kothari as Varsha
- R. Sundarrajan as Film Director
- Ramjee as Vinoth, Shekar's nephew
- Kannan
- Apollo Ravi
- Saivam Ravi
- Pudhupettai Suresh
- Kayal Bala
- Kadugu Ramamoorthy
- Gautham Vasudev Menon as himself (guest appearance)
- Sathish Krishnan as himself (guest appearance)

== Production ==
Editor Anthony revealed in August 2014 that he was set to make his first film, and it would be the remake of the Malayalam film Shutter (2012). In November 2014, he announced and began work on the venture featuring Sathyaraj in the lead role. The film also stars Anumol, Kalyani Natarajan and Dixitha Kothari, while debutant Varun, grandson of actor Isari Velan was also added to the cast. In November 2015, title of the film has been changed into Oru Naal Iravil.
