= Joshua: Imai Pol Kaakha =

2024 film by Gautham Vasudev Menon

- Theatrical release poster
- Directed by: Gautham Vasudev Menon
- Written by: Gautham Vasudev Menon
- Produced by: Ishari K. Ganesh
- Starring: Varun; Raahei; Krishna
- Cinematography: S. R. Kathir
- Edited by: Anthony
- Music by: Karthik
- Production company: Vels Film International
- Release date: 1 March 2024
- Running time: 140 minutes
- Country: India
- Language: Tamil

Joshua: Imai Pol Kaakha (transl. Joshua: Protect like an Eyelid) is a 2024 Indian Tamil-language action thriller film directed by Gautham Vasudev Menon and produced by Ishari K. Ganesh. The film, the first instalment in a planned shared universe, stars Varun in the titular role, alongside Raahei, Dhivyadharshini, Mansoor Ali Khan and Krishna. It revolves around an assassin-turned bodyguard seeking to protect his ex-girlfriend from a Mexican drug cartel.

Filming began production in late 2019 but concluded only in 2021, following delays related to the COVID-19 pandemic. The music was composed by Karthik, while S. R. Kathir and Anthony handled the cinematography and editing. The film was released on 1 March 2024, and received mixed reviews from critics.

== Plot ==
Joshua, an ex-assassin working for a private security agency in Chennai, is assigned to protect his ex-girlfriend Kundhavi Chidambaram, a lawyer based in New York City. It is revealed that Kundhavi is one of the members of a prosecution team hired to testify against Leguiziamo alias El Chapo, the leader of a Mexican drug cartel. El Chapo placed a bounty on the team and had them killed, only Kundhavi survived the attack. Kundhavi soon became the main attorney to punish El Chapo, which resulted in El Chapo in hiring local thugs to finish her.

One night, a gang headed by Don Shiva and Koti, Joshua's childhood friend, arrives to kill Kundhavi at the hotel, but Joshua and his men take them down and Joshua gets injured in the process. Joshua learns about the persons behind the attack through his boss Madhavi. Kundhavi gets kidnapped again by Shiva and Koti, but Joshua saves her again and kills Shiva. Koti escapes again and learns that Joshua is his friend. Koti tells his men to leave Kundhavi, while secretly trying to kill her for money. However, Joshua knew about this, and a fight ensues in which Joshua spares Koti due to their friendship.

Meanwhile, Kundhavi's father Chidambaram arrives to take Kundhavi to a safe place, but Madhavi realises that Chidambaram hired Koti and Shiva to kill Kundhavi as Chidambaram was involved in El Chapo's drug trade. Kundhavi and Joshua learn about this through Madhavi, where Joshua finishes Chidambaram's henchmen and Kundhavi kills Chidambaram in self-defense. Joshua promises Kundhavi that he will always be with her and will protect her from various dangers.

== Cast ==
- Varun as Joshua Indiramagan
- Raahei as Kundhavi Chidambaram
- Krishna as Koti
- Kitty as Chidambaram Krishnamoorthy
- Mansoor Ali Khan as Don Shiva
- Vichithra as Latha
- Dhivyadharshini as Madhavi
- Lizzie Antony as Shanthini
- Nishant Ramakrishnan as Hero Singh
- Sai Siddarth as Shekar
- Osthe J. Ram as a henchman

== Production ==
In July 2019, Gautham Vasudev Menon was reported to have agreed to direct a film produced by Ishari K. Ganesh of Vels Film International, following the producer's sudden intervention to relieve Menon from financial constraints that he faced during the making of Enai Noki Paayum Thota (2019), with the film starring Ganesh's nephew Varun. Menon said Suriya was considered for the lead role at one point, but declined as he found the script too similar to that of his other film Kaappaan (2019). Varun, who was shooting for Seeru in which he had gained weight to 94 kilograms for the film, subsequently lost 22 kilograms in order to achieve a sportive look. Some media reports suggested that the film would be based on the script of Yohan: Adhyayam Ondru, which was originally planned with Vijay in 2011, but Menon denied this and claimed it was a separate story.

To prepare for his role, Varun trained with Yannick Ben, a renowned Hollywood stunt director, in Paris for a month. Debutant actress Raahei was cast as the lead actress. Darbuka Siva was initially announced as the music composer in November 2019 after working with Menon in Enai Noki Paayum Thota, but was later replaced by playback singer Karthik in February 2020. The antagonist of the film was not disclosed until July 2020, when it was announced that Krishna will play the main antagonist. Krishna trained stunt sequences under Yannick Ben, who also choreographed the action sequences for the film.

Principal photography began in October 2019. By November 2019, 50% of the film was completed in a single stretch through a schedule in Chennai. The makers shot seven action sequences during January 2020, which include car fights and chasing sequences and later prepared to shoot scenes in the United Kingdom and United States. As of June 2020, filming was delayed due to the COVID-19 pandemic. By March 2021, filming was complete. Varun began dubbing his lines in April 2022.

== Soundtrack ==
The music was composed by Karthik in his third film as composer after Aravaan (2012) and Tamilselvanum Thaniyar Anjalum (2016). The first single "Hey Love", was released on 29 February 2020. The video of the second single "Naan Un Joshua" was released on 17 July 2020, along with the single in music platforms. The third single "Tappasu Neram" was released on 11 December 2021. The fourth single "Joshua Siru Paeraasai" was released on 29 February 2024.

Track listing
No.	Title	Lyrics	Singer(s)	Length
1.	"Hey Love"	Vignesh Shivan	Shashaa Tirupati	04:11
2.	"Naan Un Joshua"	Vignesh Shivan	Karthik	03:35
3.	"Tappasu Neram"	Vivek	Krishna K., Gana Guna	03:51
4.	"Joshua Siru Paeraasai"	Super Subu	Keerthana Vaidyanathan, Niranja Ramanan, Karthik	2:46
Total length:				14:23

== Release ==
Joshua: Imai Pol Kaakha was released theatrically on 1 March 2024. The film began streaming on Amazon Prime Video from 28 March 2024.

== Critical reception ==
Manigandan KR of Times Now gave 3.5/5 stars and wrote "Joshua is yet another typical Gautham Vasudev Menon film – one that has class stamped all over it!." Sudhir Srinivasan of The New Indian Express gave 3/5 stars and wrote "At a time when filmmakers, especially the established ones, are going for bigger and bigger, it's a relief to see one aim for something modest, something simple, something with no fluff—and pretty much deliver." Roopa Radhakrishnan of The Times of India gave 2.5/5 stars and wrote "Joshua: Imai Pol Kaakha works largely due to its action set pieces and music. Joshua, as a character, may be formidable but the same cannot be said about this film."

Ranjani Krishnakumar of The News Minute gave 2/5 stars and wrote "Gautham Vasudev Menon's latest has got love, action, mystery and tension. Yet, none of it captures our emotion or imagination, independently or as a whole. In the end, it's as tiresome as it's tired." Bhuvanesh Chandar of The Hindu wrote, "In his most disappointing film yet, director Gautham Menon gives us a terribly weak lead protagonist who cannot hold afloat the emotionless narrative or the uninventive action set-pieces." Harshini S V of Film Companion wrote, "You could like or dislike a Gautham Menon film, but Joshua is a film where you struggle to see the director's touch."

== Future ==
Joshua: Imai Pol Kaakha is the first of a planned shared universe. Dhruva Natchathiram, which is the forthcoming sophomore instalment in the universe, has Dhivyadharshini reprising her role as Madhavi.
