= Gautham Vasudev Menon's unrealized projects =

During his career, Indian film director Gautham Vasudev Menon has worked on a number of projects which never progressed beyond the production stage under his direction. Some of these projects fell in development hell, were officially canceled, or would see life under a different production team.

== 2000s ==
=== Iru Vizhi Unadhu ===
In August 2001, following the release of Minnale (2001), Menon began work on a film tentatively titled Iru Vizhi Unadhu, though the project did not develop into production. The film was set to have music composed by Harris Jayaraj and songs written by Thamarai.

=== Hindi remake of Kaakha Kaakha ===
In March 2003, prior to the theatrical release of Kaakha Kaakha (2003), Menon noted that the film would have been better suited to a Mumbai-setting, as police encounters were more common in the city than in Chennai. He revealed plans of potentially remaking the film in Hindi with Ajay Devgn in the lead role, if a chance had presented itself. Soon after Kaakha Kaakha's release in August 2003, Menon became attached to a Hindi remake of the film produced by Feroz Khan, with Fardeen Khan, Preity Zinta and Jeevan in the lead roles. He revealed that he would make small changes to the film to reflect the Mumbai-setting and hoped that the film would be made at a bigger budget than the Tamil original. However, the project eventually did not materialise and Menon opted out of the collaboration.

In July 2004, Menon agreed terms to direct and produce the film in Hindi with Sunny Deol in the lead role. During the pre-production phase, he revealed that the script was written five years ago with Deol in mind. The film eventually failed to take off despite Deol committing to work on the film between July and September 2005. In April 2006, Menon noted that the remake was dropped citing that he was not keen for Deol to be in the film. In the late 2000s, Menon tried to convince Suriya to work on the Hindi version of the film but was unsuccessful.

The film was later made in Hindi as Force (2011) with John Abraham in the lead role. Menon was briefly attached to the film after accepting an invitation from producer Vipul Shah to remake the film, before opting out.

=== Untitled film with Prabhas ===
In October 2003, an untitled film was announced with Prabhas, producer Tatineni Ajay Kumar and D Raj Varma as the presenter. Trisha was later confirmed to be a part of the film in mid-2004.

=== English remake of Kaakha Kaakha ===
Menon and producer, Kalaipuli S. Dhanu floated an idea of an English-language version of Kaakha Kaakha (2003) with a Chechnyan backdrop, though talks on a potential collaboration with Ashok Amritraj collapsed. Menon later stated that he dropped plans to make the film in English, as he wanted to establish himself across India first.

=== Chennaiyil Oru Mazhaikaalam with Suriya ===
In late 2003, Menon began work on a romantic drama film titled Chennaiyil Oru Mazhaikaalam with Suriya in the lead role for film producer Srinivasa Raju. He had written the script of the film while on a recce to Kochi during monsoon season. Menon considered either Trisha or Asin for the role, before eventually selecting the latter, who had worked with him on Gharshana (2004). Daniel Balaji was also a part of the film's original cast.

Menon revealed that the film would initially be about a young college student who falls in love with a classmate, and in the second half, something large happens on a national level, prompting the protagonist to take it upon himself to solve that, with just his band of friends. The first schedule of the film began in January 2004 in Visakhapatanam, but the project was eventually dropped owing to Menon's personal issues. Menon later reworked the script of the film to make Vaaranam Aayiram (2008) with a different cast and crew.

=== Hindi remake of Vettaiyaadu Vilaiyaadu ===
Menon expressed an interest in remaking Vettaiyaadu Vilaiyaadu (2006) in Hindi with Amitabh Bachchan in the lead role, without the love angle, though the project fell through after discussions with UTV Motion Pictures. In 2012, he started negotiations with producers to make a Hindi version of the film with Shah Rukh Khan in the lead role.

=== Chennaiyil Oru Mazhaikaalam with Trisha ===
In July 2007, Menon began work on a youth-centric film titled Chennaiyil Oru Mazhaikaalam featuring Trisha in the lead role. He retained the title of his previous shelved film starring Suriya, as producer Aascar Ravichandran, who planned to revive the other project, was not keen on keeping the old title. For the first time in his career, Menon opted to collaborate with A. R. Rahman, rather than Harris Jayaraj, as the film's music composer. A photoshoot for the film was completed by the end of July 2007, with four rookie male actors joining Trisha in the film. Menon signed on actress Sridevi's nephew Karthik, his assistant director Veera, dancer Sathish and video jockey Shaam, for acting roles in the film. Actresses Nikita Thukral and Nethra, previously seen in Thoovanam (2007), also joined the film in lead roles, while Daniel Balaji was cast as the antagonist.

Set in the backdrop of Chennai's IT industry, the team began its shoot in Hyderabad during September 2007, with the intention of completing the process in three months. The date was not met and Menon alternated on schedules for the film with his commitments on Vaaranam Aayiram (2008). A second schedule for the film in Chennai began during May 2008, after which fifty percent of the film was complete. As Menon was working with Trisha on Chennaiyil Oru Mazhaikaalam, he chose to use her dates for Vinnaithaandi Varuvaayaa (2010), when the film was put on hold.

In 2011, Menon revealed that the film was dropped because he felt the actors "needed to be trained", and would consider restarting the project at a later stage.

=== Surangani ===
In September 2008, Menon signed on with Sivaji Productions to direct Ajith Kumar and Sameera Reddy in an action drama film titled Surangani. Menon planned the film as a spiritual prequel to Billa (2007) and revealed that the film would focus on the career growth of a Sri Lankan refugee into a gangster involved in the criminal underworld of Tamil Nadu. Ajith was set to play the lead character of Sura, while Reddy would have portrayed Ragini.

Harris Jayaraj was signed on to compose the film's score and soundtrack, amid media reports that Ajith was insistent on having Jayaraj over A. R. Rahman to ensure that the film was completed quickly. Menon had hoped to shoot the film in places such as Thoothukudi and Tirunelveli and cinematographer Nirav Shah became attached to the project, with a proposed start date for the shoot scheduled for November 2008. The producers contemplated changing the film's title after another production studio, Miracle Films, claimed that they had already registered Surangani for a project being directed by J. Suresh. Menon later pulled out of the commitment in November 2008, citing that the producers were not willing to let him take his own time with scripting. He noted that Sivaji Productions wanted to complete the project as soon as possible, while his schedule was largely busy until 2010 with other commitments.

=== Thuppariyum Anand ===
Menon began research and pre-production work on a 1930s period spy thriller titled Thuppariyum Anand in late 2008. The script was adapted to suit Indian audiences from a Clive Cussler novel, and told the tale of a chase between a bank robber and a police officer. He had written the film with Suriya in mind and then offered the film to Aamir Khan and Kamal Haasan, though neither option materialised. Menon then pitched the film to Ajith Kumar for a potential project, but the film failed to progress.

== 2010s ==
=== Crime series with Parthiban ===
In early 2011, Menon began pre-production work on a television series featuring Parthiban in the lead role of a detective, but did not carry through with the idea after he failed to find financiers. He had hoped to film 150 episodes, which would play out over a 30-week period and feature different stories to run between every Monday and Friday.

=== Assi Nabbe Poorey Sau ===
A Hindi version of the romantic films Neethaane En Ponvasantham (2012) in Tamil and Yeto Vellipoyindhi Manasu (2012) in Telugu, titled Assi Nabbe Poorey Sau, was also shot simultaneously with Aditya Roy Kapoor and Samantha playing the lead roles. However, the failure of Menon's other Hindi film Ekk Deewana Tha (2012) saw production ultimately halted. Sixty percent of the film was completed by the time of pausing the project. The team chose not to complete the project after the Tamil version received a mixed response from audiences.

=== Yohan: Adhyayam Ondru ===
In July 2011, Menon began pre-production work on the first film of an action-adventure series of films titled Yohan starring Vijay in the title role with the first film titled Yohan: Adhyayam Ondru. He revealed that the film would narrate the tale of an agent going against an arms dealer, who has caused mass destruction around the world, and compared the theme of the film to the Bond series. The character of Yohan would play an American citizen, and an English actress would be cast in the lead female role. However, after a year of pre-production, the director shelved the film citing differences of opinion about the project. Menon later revealed that Vijay did not want to do the film citing that it felt "too much like an English film".

=== Yennai Arindhaal 2 ===
Soon after the release of Yennai Arindhaal in February 2015, Menon began working on a sequel to the film. In May 2018, he revealed that he had completed thirty percent of the script and was only keen to approach Ajith Kumar once the full-bound script was ready. He revealed that the actor was previously bothered by Menon's lack of completed script during the making of the earlier film.

=== Ondraaga ===
In October 2015, Menon began planning a multilingual production to be shot in Tamil, Telugu, Malayalam and Kannada, which would feature four actors in leading roles. The film was reported to revolve around the lives of four friends from the four Southern Indian states, who meet at a wedding after many years, and then decide to take a roadtrip in the United States. Menon initially discussed making the project with Silambarasan, Allu Arjun, Fahadh Faasil and Puneeth Rajkumar, with the latter also keen to produce the Kannada version of the film. Over the following months, Prithviraj agreed to portray the Malayali character in the film ahead of Fahadh Faasil, and accepted the offer despite Menon's initial doubts about whether the actor would feature in a multi-starrer project. Likewise, Naga Chaitanya also was reported to have replaced Allu Arjun as the Telugu character in the film.

Menon continued to develop the script while finishing the productions of Achcham Yenbadhu Madamaiyada (2016) and Enai Noki Paayum Thota (2019). By June 2016, Menon revealed that the film would be titled Ondraaga and that it would be shot in the United States over a seventy-day schedule. He revealed that Sai Dharam Tej had joined the cast replacing Naga Chaitanya, while the Tamil character was yet to be finalised. He also suggested that actresses Anushka Shetty and Tamannaah would form a part of the cast, and that an advance payment was made to them. Soon after, Jayam Ravi held discussions about playing the Tamil character, while actress Manjima Mohan was also considered for a role. In an interview in November 2016, Menon stated that the character of Karthik from Vinnaithaandi Varuvaayaa would be retained in Ondraaga, with the plot taking off eight years after the release of the previous film. He stated Karthik's character had changed his concept of women and would appear as a playboy in the new project, while the character of Jessie Thekekuttu would also feature in the film. Menon revealed that A. R. Rahman would compose music for the project, and likened the mood of the film to the Hindi films, Dil Chahta Hai (2001) and Zindagi Na Milegi Dobara (2011). He also added that he was hopeful that Silambarasan would agree to work in the film and reprise the role of Karthik.

Production on the film was postponed as the makers were unable to finalise the actors to play the Tamil and Telugu characters, while Menon also began work on Dhruva Natchathiram with Vikram. In March 2017, Prithviraj called the film a "very modern take on friendship and self-discovery", while revealing that the script was complete and production would possibly begin by the end of 2017. In early 2018, following a brief period where Menon prioritised his other productions, he signed on Madhavan to portray the Tamil character of Karthik after Silambarasan had turned down the offer citing his reluctance to work with other lead actors. Tovino Thomas was also signed to replace Prithviraj as the Malayalam character. The film failed to develop, with Menon later stating that the film would not proceed without Silambarasan.

=== Kaakha Kaakha 2 ===
In February 2018, Menon revealed that he had plans of making a sequel to Kaakha Kaakha with Suriya. By August 2020, Menon revealed that he had written most of the script but that Suriya wanted a gap between his cop films after the Singam series, and that the project was on hold.

In September 2022, the original film's producer Kalaipuli S. Thanu revealed that plans for the film were in place and that he had already paid an advance to Menon for the project.

=== Kamal & Kadambari ===
During late 2019, Menon revealed that he was working on the script of a romantic film starring Suriya in the lead role, titled Kamal & Kadambari. The film would focus on two singers, and how they connect in London over music, songs and the work of Ilaiyaraja. Menon revealed that Suriya had liked his one-line narration of the project, and he continued to develop the script during the first COVID-19 lockdown. In his short film, Karthik Dial Seytha Yenn (2020), Menon showed his protagonist working on the script of a film titled Kamal & Kadambari: A Love Story.

== 2020s ==
=== Vinnaithaandi Varuvaayaa 2 ===
In May 2020, Menon revealed that he was set to make a sequel to Vinnaithaandi Varuvaayaa (2010) with Silambarasan in the lead role. The announcement came after the release of a five-minute short film titled Karthik Dial Seytha Yenn put together by the original film's team during the COVID-19 lockdown in India. Menon had earlier alluded to another project Ondraga as the sequel to Vinnaithaandi Varuvaayaa, while separately Silambarasan was in legal trouble for refusing to return an advance payment for a separate project titled Vinnaithaandi Varuvaayaa 2 from producer Vijay Raghavendra.

=== Vettaiyaadu Vilaiyaadu 2 ===
Menon confirmed that he was working on a sequel to his action-thriller Vettaiyaadu Vilaiyaadu (2006) in March 2020, and that he was in discussions with Kamal Haasan to reprise the lead character of Raghavan. He hinted that the character would be fifteen years older in the sequel, Jyothika's character of Aradhana would still be present, and that the pair would have a teenage daughter. He suggested that the film may take off in April 2020 and that Vels Film International would be the producers for the project. In June 2020, Menon revealed that he was still working on the script and that the climax of the film was still being considered. He also stated that he was unsure if Kamal Haasan would eventually accept terms to work on the film. The following month, the makers reportedly held discussions with Anushka Shetty and Keerthy Suresh for roles in the film. After a period of inactivity, media reports suggested that the team were still considering the project in August 2022.

=== Nadhigalilae Neeradum Suriyan ===
In February 2021, Menon announced that he would collaborate with actor Silambarasan and music composer A. R. Rahman on a film titled Nadhigalilae Neeradum Suriyan, in a venture produced by Vels Film International. The shoot of the project became delayed owing to the COVID-19 lockdown in India and at a time where the shoot was expected to restart in August 2021, the project underwent significant change and re-emerged under a new title of Vendhu Thanindhathu Kaadu (2022). In September 2022, after the release of Vendhu Thanindhathu Kaadu, Menon revealed that Nadhigalilae Neeradum Suriyan was a different script narrating the "new-age love story" of an actor. A. R. Rahman had completed work on three songs for the project, and the team had been in search of the female lead actress, when the project got stalled.

=== Vendhu Thanindhathu Kaadu 2 ===
Prior to the release of Vendhu Thanindhathu Kaadu (2022) in August 2022, media reports emerged that the film would have a sequel. The first part of the film narrated the origin story of the lead character portrayed by Silambarasan, while it was reported that the sequel would concentrate on the rise of the character within the underworld. Menon later confirmed plans to make a sequel to the film based on the first film's success, and suggested that the film would be set in Lucknow. The film's writer B. Jeyamohan noted that the second film would have more violence and compared the script to that of Lokesh Kanagaraj's Vikram (2022).

In May 2023, the film's producer Ishari K. Ganesh of Vels Film International revealed that Menon was working on the screenplay of the film and that Silambarasan was eager to work on the project.

=== Gharshana 2 ===
During the promotions of Vendhu Thanindhathu Kaadu (2022) in Hyderabad during September 2022, Menon revealed that he was scripting a sequel to Gharshana (2004) and that Venkatesh would be portraying the lead role. He noted that the pair had held discussions about the collaboration in mid-2022 at a meeting at the house of Rana Daggubati. Venkatesh and Daggubati had earlier speculated about a potential sequel to the film in 2007 and 2020 respectively, without official confirmation from the director.

== Offers ==
=== Force ===
Vipul Shah approached Menon to direct the Hindi version of Kaakha Kaakha (2003) in 2010 as Force with John Abraham and Genelia D'Souza. Menon initially agreed before pulling out again.

=== Rehnaa Hai Terre Dil Mein remake ===
In 2011, Vashu Bhagnani, the producer of Rehnaa Hai Terre Dil Mein (2001) approached Menon to remake the film with his son Jackky Bhagnani in the lead role, but Menon was uninterested with the offer. The failure of the original film had left Menon disappointed, prompting him to claim in hindsight that the film lacked the simplicity of Minnale (2001) and that the producer's intervention affecting proceedings. Several years after release, the film gained popularity through screenings on television and subsequently developed a cult following among young Hindi-speaking audiences.

=== X ===
In 2013, Menon was briefly associated with the anthology film, X, helping partially direct a script written by Thiagarajan Kumararaja before opting out and being replaced by Nalan Kumarasamy.

=== Tamil remake of Race 2 ===
Menon was signed by A. M. Rathnam to remake the Hindi film Race 2 (2013) with Ajith Kumar in the lead role. Menon later tried to opt out of the project before being able to make Yennai Arindhaal (2015) with the same actor and producer.

=== Andhagan ===
In August 2019, it was announced that Thiagarajan had purchased the rights to remake the Hindi film Andhadhun (2018) in Tamil. The team held discussions with Gautham Vasudev Menon about directing the film, but he ultimately did not sign on the project, later titled Andhagan.

=== Victim ===
Menon was initially selected to direct a short film for the anthology series Victim on SonyLIV, but later opted out of his commitments.
