= Varun (actor) =

Indian actor (born 1992)

- Born: Jayandran Kamalakannan; 22 December 1992 (age 33); Chennai, Tamil Nadu, India
- Occupation: Actor
- Years active: 2013-present
- Height: 183 cm (6 ft 0 in)
- Relatives: Ishari K. Ganesh (uncle)

Varun is an Indian actor who predominantly works in Tamil cinema. He is the grandson of Isari Velan. His entry into the film industry occurred with his debut role in Anthony's Oru Naal Iravil in 2015. Since then, he has consistently engaged in projects closely associated with acclaimed directors such as A. L. Vijay and Prabhu Deva. In 2024, Varun collaborated with Gautham Vasudev Menon on an action thriller titled Joshua Imai Pol Kaakha.

== Career ==
Varun commenced his career in the entertainment industry as a character artist, making his debut in A. L. Vijay's Thalaivaa starring actor Vijay. Subsequently, he worked as an assistant director under the guidance of A. L. Vijay for Thalaivaa. Encouraged by A. L. Vijay, Varun collaborated with him as an actor and producer in the thriller film Oru Naal Iravil (2015), directed by film editor Anthony. In preparation for his role as a thirty-year-old auto driver, Varun underwent a notable physical transformation, gaining 15 kilograms (33 pounds). The ensemble cast also included Sathyaraj, Anumol and Yugi Sethu. The film received positive reviews from critics, with Sify acknowledging Varun for portraying his role with "consummate ease," and Behindwoods commending his performance as the assistant of Sathyaraj.

Prabhu Deva recommended Varun for a role alongside Jayam Ravi and Arvind Swamy in the fantasy thriller Bogan, where he portrayed a police officer, necessitating additional physical preparation. Varun played character roles in Prabhu Deva's production Sometimes portraying a drug addict, and as the second lead actor in Neruppu Da with Vikram Prabhu and Vijay's Vanamagan alongside Ravi and Sayyeshaa.

Varun marked his debut as a lead actor in the 2019 Tamil comedy-drama Puppy co-starring with Samyuktha Hegde. Continuing his trajectory, Varun headlined Gautham Vasudev Menon’s action thriller titled Joshua: Imai Pol Kaakha, released in 2024.

== Filmography ==
=== Films ===
| Year | Film | Role | Notes |
|---|---|---|---|
| 2013 | Thalaivaa | Vishwa's friend | Uncredited role |
| 2015 | Oru Naal Iravil | Soori | |
| 2017 | Bogan | Sathya | |
| 2017 | Vanamagan | Vignesh (Vicky) | |
| 2017 | Neruppu Da | Dhana | |
| 2018 | Sometimes | Vivek | |
| 2019 | LKG | Sniper | Cameo appearance |
| 2019 | Comali | Nagaraj | |
| 2019 | Puppy | Prabhu | |
| 2020 | Seeru | Vyasarpadi Malli | |
| 2021 | Kutty Story | Adam Vice | Anthology film; Segment: Lokham |
| 2024 | Joshua: Imai Pol Kaakha | Joshua Indiramagan | |

=== Television ===
| Year | Show | Role | Notes |
|---|---|---|---|
| 2021-2022 | Bigg Boss Tamil 5 | Contestant | 84 days |
