= Jomon T. John =

Indian cinematographer

- Born: Cherthala, Kerala, India
- Education: Government Film and Television Institute
- Occupations: Cinematographer; film producer
- Years active: 2011–present
- Spouse(s): Ann Augustine (m. 2014; div. 2021) Ansu Elsa Verghese (m.2023)

Jomon T. John ISC is an Indian cinematographer and producer who works predominantly in Malayalam cinema. Jomon made his debut with Chaappa Kurishu (2011). Jomon won the 2015 Kerala State Film Award for Best Cinematography for the films Nee-Na, Ennu Ninte Moideen, and Charlie.

His well-known films include Beautiful (2011), Thattathin Marayathu (2012), Ayalum Njanum Thammil (2012), Vikramadithyan (2014), Ennu Ninte Moideen (2015), Charlie (2015), Jacobinte Swargarajyam (2016), and Thanneer Mathan Dinangal (2019). He also worked on Hindi films such as Golmaal Again (2017), Simmba (2018), and Sooryavanshi (2020). Jomon made his debut as a producer by co-producing the film Thanneer Mathan Dinangal. Jomon is also one among the members of the Indian Society of Cinematographers.

== Career ==
Jomon completed his diploma in cinematography from Government Film and Television Institute, Bangalore. He subsequently became active in the advertisement film industry. He made his feature film debut when Sameer Thahir signed him as the cinematographer of his debut directorial, Chaappa Kurish (2011) after which he went on become a part of many successful films. In 2015, his work in Picket 43, Ennu Ninte Moideen, Charlie and Oru Vadakkan Selfie were highly acclaimed, he was soon signed by Tamil filmmaker Gautham Vasudev Menon for the Dhanush-starrer Enai Noki Paayum Thota. After completion of the film, Menon also signed him for his next Dhruva Natchathiram and filmed a 2:49 second teaser in New York City. But soon, Jomon opted out of the film as it was rescheduled, and the new schedule clashed with the dates he had earlier allocated for Rohit Shetty's Golmaal Again.

== Personal life ==
Jomon married actress Ann Augustine on 2 February 2014. The couple filed for divorce in 2021.

In December 2023, Jomon married Ansu Elsa Verghese.

== Filmography ==
Key
†	Denotes films that have not yet been released

Year	Title	Language	Notes	Ref.
2011	Chaappa Kurish	Malayalam		
2011	Beautiful	Malayalam	Asianet Film Award for Best Cinematography	
2012	Thattathin Marayathu	Malayalam	SIIMA Award for Best Cinematographer	
2012	Poppins	Malayalam		
2012	Ayalum Njanum Thammil	Malayalam		
2013	ABCD: American-Born Confused Desi	Malayalam		
2013	Thira	Malayalam	SIIMA Award for Best Cinematographer	
2014	Bramman	Tamil	Debut in Tamil cinema	
2014	Fattack	Hindi	Debut in Hindi cinema	
2014	Vikramadithyan	Malayalam		
2015	Picket 43	Malayalam		
2015	Oru Vadakkan Selfie	Malayalam		
2015	Nee-Na	Malayalam	Kerala State Film Award for Best Cinematography	
2015	Ennu Ninte Moideen	Malayalam	Kerala State Film Award for Best Cinematography, Asianet Film Award for Best Cinematographer	
2015	Charlie	Malayalam	Kerala State Film Award for Best Cinematography	
2016	Jacobinte Swargarajyam	Malayalam		
2017	Golmaal Again	Hindi	Zee Cine Award for Best Cinematographer	
2018	Simmba	Hindi		
2019	Thanneer Mathan Dinangal	Malayalam	Also Producer; also features segments shot by Vinod Illampally	
2019	Love Action Drama	Malayalam	Also features segments shot by Roby Varghese Raj	
2019	Enai Noki Paayum Thota	Tamil	Also features segments shot by Manoj Paramahamsa	
2020	Irul	Malayalam	Also Producer	
2020	Paava Kadhaigal	Tamil	Segment: Thangam	
2021	Cold Case	Malayalam	Also Producer; features segments shot by Girish Gangadharan	
2021	Sooryavanshi	Hindi		
2022	Cirkus	Hindi		
2022	Kaapa	Malayalam		
2023	Miss Shetty Mr Polishetty	Telugu	Additional cinematography	
2024	ARM	Malayalam		
2024	Kadha Innuvare	Malayalam		
2025	Kingdom	Telugu	Debut in Telugu cinema; also features segments shot by Girish Gangadharan	
2025	Karam	Malayalam		
2026	Thudakkam	Malayalam		
2026	Khalifa: The Intro	Malayalam		

=== As guest cinematographer ===
Key
†	Denotes films that have not yet been released

Year	Title	Language	Notes	Ref.
2016	Sahasam Swasaga Sagipo	Telugu	1 Song only	
2026	Dhruva Natchathiram	Tamil	Teaser only	

== Awards ==
Kerala State Film Awards

- Best Cinematographer for Charlie, Ennu Ninte Moideen, Nee-Na

Asianet Film Awards 2011

- Best Cinematographer for Beautiful

2nd South Indian International Movie Awards

- Nominated - Best Cinematographer for Thattathin Marayathu

3rd South Indian International Movie Awards

- Best Cinematographer for Thira
