= Comali =

2019 film directed by Pradeep Ranganathan

- Theatrical release poster
- Directed by: Pradeep Ranganathan
- Written by: Pradeep Ranganathan
- Produced by: Ishari K. Ganesh
- Starring: Ravi Mohan; Kajal Aggarwal
- Cinematography: Richard M. Nathan
- Edited by: Pradeep E. Ragav
- Music by: Hiphop Tamizha
- Production company: Vels Films International
- Distributed by: Sakthi Film Factory
- Release date: 15 August 2019
- Running time: 148 minutes
- Country: India
- Language: Tamil
- Box office: ₹51 crore

Comali (pronounced [koːmaːli] transl. Clown) is a 2019 Indian Tamil-language comedy drama film produced by Ishari K. Ganesh and written and directed by Pradeep Ranganathan in his directorial debut. The film stars Ravi Mohan, Kajal Aggarwal, Yogi Babu, Samyuktha Hegde and K. S. Ravikumar. It revolves around a man who has missed 16 years of his life due to being in a coma, and struggles to adapt to the new improved world.

Comali was released on 15 August 2019 coinciding with Indian Independence Day. The film became commercially successful by grossing ₹51 crore at the box office. It won the Tamil Nadu State Film Award for Third Best Film.

== Plot ==
In 2000, Ravi is a school student whose father raised him with morals like treating everyone fairly. He loves his classmate, Nikitha, and tries proposing to her. Just then, a goon, Dharmaraj, while escaping after killing a rival gangster, Gaja, takes Nikitha as a human shield. Ravi is hit by a truck while trying to save her and ends up comatose.

16 years later, in 2016, Ravi awakens. He sees his friend Mani and learns that his father died and his sister married Mani, who has taken care of him all these years and incurred significant debts. Thiyagesh, the doctor who treated Ravi, tells Mani to fulfil Ravi's wishes since he has missed 16 years of his life. Fulfilling Ravi's first wish, Mani takes Ravi to Nikitha's house, only to realise she is married to Thiyagesh. Nikitha, not wanting to embarrass her husband, lies that she never liked Ravi. Mani tries to cheer up Ravi by helping him find a woman on a matrimony website.

Ravi falls in love with Rithika, whom he saw on the website and during his nephew's birthday party. She is a friend of Ravi's sister. After some talking over the phone, Rithika takes a liking to Ravi. Still an innocent teenager at heart, Ravi mistakes Rithika's air kiss while taking a selfie as her consent to kiss and kisses her. Rithika, who did not expect this, slaps him. This incident gets blown out of proportion by the public and media. Ravi's sister scolds him for causing them more problems, adding to their debt problem, and asks him to find a job.

Unable to obtain a well-paying job since he never graduated, Ravi becomes a security guard at the museum where Rithika works. She tells him that she has forgiven him after realising his innocence. Ravi sees a statue at the museum and realises that it belongs to his royal ancestors. However, Dharmaraj, now an MLA, currently owns the statue and lies that he is the royal heir, using the statue as proof.

Meanwhile, Ravi also tries to familiarise himself with society and uses YouTube, where his reactions to modern society make him famous. As his fan following increases, Ravi devises a plan to prove that the statue belongs to him. With help from Rithika and Mani, he gets a button camera to livestream his conversation with Dharmaraj. Ravi's plan goes well until a sweat droplet short-circuits the camera. Ravi suddenly remembers a school photo with the statue taken by Nikitha and tries to retrieve it from Nikitha, but Thiyagesh accidentally destroys the photo negative.

Disappointed but determined, Ravi thinks of another plan. With the help of Nikitha, Thiyagesh, and the rest of his crew, Ravi decides to defeat Dharmaraj without using technology. He plans to get inside Dharmaraj's house, posing as a distant relative while using Thiyagesh as a scout. Ravi, Mani and Nikitha go to Dharmaraj's house and distract Dharmaraj's pregnant wife, Bhanu, while Ravi tries to steal the statue and replace it with a duplicate. However, Bhanu catches him and attempts to inform her husband, but goes into labour. Ravi helps her to get to the hospital.

En route, Ravi's auto gets stuck in a flood due to heavy downpours, so he carries Bhanu to the hospital with people on the street helping them. Ravi realises that humanity still exists despite all the changes in society. Dharmaraj hears about Bhanu and rushes to the hospital. After learning that Ravi helped his wife and their child was born safely, he thanks him.

Ravi learns Rithika filmed his outburst at Nikitha's house, criticising modern society for over-dependence on technology, and the video has gone viral, earning him money to clear Mani's debts. He retains the statue as a family heirloom and becomes a famous YouTuber making videos on social issues.

== Cast ==
- Ravi Mohan as Ravi N.
- Kajal Aggarwal as Rithika Mohan
- Yogi Babu as Mani
- Samyuktha Hegde as Nikitha Krishnamurthy (Note: Misspelled as Nikitha R. in the song "Hi Sonna Podhum".)
- K. S. Ravikumar as MLA Dharmaraj "Dharma"
  - Sembaruthi Sanjay as young Dharmaraj
- Shah Ra as Dr D. Thiyagesh
- Vinodhini Vaidyanathan as Bhanu
- RJ Ananthi as Divya
- Manikandan Vaidhyanathan as a loan collection agent
- Kavita Radheshyam as the owner of Bajji shop
- Praveena as Ravi's mother
- Aadukalam Naren as Ravi's father
- Ponnambalam as Gaja
- Varun as Nagaraj
- KPY Ramar as Dharmaraj's sidekick
- Bijili Ramesh as Dharmaraj's watchman
- Prashanth Rangaswamy as a TV interviewer
- Mannai Sadhik as a resident
- Nithyaraj as Ravi's neighbor
- Snehan as King (cameo appearance)
- Pradeep Ranganathan as Joseph (cameo appearance)
- Seeni Ammal as a sanitation worker (uncredited cameo appearance in the song "Oliyum Oliyum")

== Production ==
Pradeep Ranganathan had initially signed up to direct the film for Ishari K. Ganesh under the Prabhu Deva Studios banner, before Ganesh switched over to Vels Films International. Prabhu Deva initially agreed to play the lead role before he later opted out of the project. Pradeep had also narrated the film to G. V. Prakash Kumar, though Ravi Mohan was subsequently signed on.

Ravi lost 20 kilograms (44 lb) for the film, which was shot in Chennai, Tamil Nadu, on a specially-built school set. In September 2018, Kavita Radheshyam was brought in to play a role. Hiphop Tamizha agreed to compose the film's music, while Richard M. Nathan and Pradeep E. Ragav were selected as cinematographer and editor respectively. Halfway through the production of Ganesh's venture Puppy, Varun signed on to play a supporting role in this film.

== Soundtrack ==
The soundtrack was composed by Hiphop Tamizha.

Track listing
No.	Title	Lyrics	Singer(s)	Length
1.	"Paisa Note"	Hiphop Tamizha, Pradeep Ranganathan, Gana Kavi, Mobin	Hiphop Tamizha, Koushik Krish	3:04
2.	"Yaara Comali"	Hiphop Tamizha	Hiphop Tamizha	3:18
3.	"Oliyum Oliyum"	Kabilan Vairamuthu	Sathya Narayan, Ajay Krishnaa, Rahul Nambiar	4:45
4.	"Hi Sonna Pothum"	Pradeep Ranganathan	Kaushik Krish	3:50
5.	"Nanba Nanba"	Hiphop Tamizha	Sanjith Hegde	2:33
Total length:				17:29

== Controversies ==
An aspiring film director Pa. Krishnamoorthy accused the filmmakers of plagiarising his script, 25+25=25, which, too, was about a man who wakes up from a coma. Krishnamoorthy had registered his script with the South Indian Film Writers Association (SIFWA) in 2014 and pitched the script to several sources, including script agents, whom he speculated might have caused its leak. SIFWA compared Krishnamoorthy's script with Comali and determined that it was the same story. Krishnamoorthy said, "A twelve-member body in the Writers' Union, headed by a renowned director like Bhagyaraj, would not have decided in my favour if they thought only the premise of both stories were the same." However, Pradeep denied plagiarising the script, saying, "We both could have come up with the same idea. The script of Comali is something I had conceptualised even during my short film days." To settle the matter, the Comali producers agreed to add a card before the film that would credit Krishnamoorthy as the source of the story. However, Pradeep said, "The story of a man waking up from coma after years has been used time and again...". He also included a succeeding card mocking the previous card.

The first trailer, released in early August 2019, features a scene near the end where Ravi is told the year is 2016, and is shown a real-life speech of actor Rajinikanth announcing his political entry as proof, but Ravi retorts that the speech is from 1996. This caused backlash among fans of Rajinikanth who accused the film of defaming him by implying he had been delaying his political entry since 1996. They also noted the year was anachronistic as Rajinikanth actually made his speech in 2017 and, in 1996, only supported the alliance of the Dravida Munnetra Kazhagam and the Tamil Maanila Congress. The footage of Rajinkanth was later deleted from the theatrical cut and replaced with footage of politician Nanjil Sampath talking about the Kaveri River water dispute.

== Release and reception ==
The film was released on 15 August 2019. S. Srivatsan of The Hindu wrote, "The lack of seriousness is evident, for, Comali looks like an assortment of convenient filmmaking. What starts as a rapturous comedy becomes an unintentional heist drama in the second half; traverses into Samuthirakani's universe of stronger-the-messages-louder-the-applause, and ends up as a survival movie, that is painstakingly exhaustive". Thinkal Menon of The Times of India rated 2.5/5, stating that "An entertaining first half didn't have an equally engaging latter half because of some melodramatic scenes."

Sify rated 3/5, stating that "The first half of Comali is super engaging, the second half goes in various directions and moves away from the core theme. The climax looks forced although the message on humanity stays relevant." Sreedhar Pillai, for Firstpost, rated the film 3/5, stating that "Comali is packaged as a jolly-feel-good entertainer, laced with emotions and nostalgia." Baradwaj Rangan wrote "It's hard to classify the severely underwhelming Comali because the director himself isn't sure what he's making".

== Accolades ==
Event	Category	Recipient(s)	Ref.
South Indian International Movie Awards	Best Debut Director	Pradeep Ranganathan	
Tamil Nadu State Film Awards	Third Best Film	Comali	

== Potential remake ==
In September 2019, Boney Kapoor announced a Hindi remake of the film would star his son Arjun Kapoor. Bayview Projects, Boney's production company, holds the remake rights for all languages including Hindi.
