= Dhruva Natchathiram (upcoming film) =

Upcoming Indian Tamil spy thriller film by Gautham Menon

- Film poster
- Directed by: Gautham Vasudev Menon
- Written by: Gautham Vasudev Menon; Deepak Venkateshan
- Produced by: Gautham Vasudev Menon
- Starring: Vikram; Ritu Varma; Aishwarya Rajesh; R. Parthiban; Radhika Sarathkumar; Simran; Vinayakan
- Cinematography: Manoj Paramahamsa; S. R. Kathir; Vishnu Dev; Additional: Jomon T. John; Santhana Krishnan Ravichandran
- Edited by: Anthony
- Music by: Harris Jayaraj
- Production companies: Ondraga Entertainment; Oruoorileoru Film House
- Running time: 145 minutes
- Country: India
- Language: Tamil
- Budget: est. ₹80 crore

Dhruva Natchathiram (transl. Pole star), also marketed with the subtitle Chapter One – Yuddha Kaandam (transl. War Chapter), is an upcoming Indian Tamil-language spy action thriller film directed and produced by Gautham Vasudev Menon. The film stars Vikram, alongside an ensemble cast consisting of Ritu Varma, Aishwarya Rajesh, R. Parthiban, Radhika Sarathkumar, Simran and Vinayakan. Set in the same shared universe as Menon's Joshua: Imai Pol Kaakha (2024), it follows a covert operative who leads a team of elite professionals named "The Basement", with the intentions of taking down terrorist organisations secretly without being bound by law and order.

The film was initially announced with Suriya in 2013, but several months after the announcement, Menon shelved the project citing creative differences with the actor. He revived the project in 2015 and finalised Vikram as the lead actor. The film began production in 2017 and was shot in seven countries, but languished in production hell for years owing to Menon's financial constraints and the COVID-19 pandemic, before concluding in February 2023. The film has music composed by Harris Jayaraj, cinematography handled by Manoj Paramahamsa, S. R. Kathir and Vishnu Dev and editing by Anthony.

Originally announced for an August 2017 release, the film remained unreleased for years due to legal and financial issues. In April 2026, it was cleared for release after most of Menon's debts were settled.

== Premise ==
John, a covert operative, leads a team of elite professionals called "The Basement", with the intention of taking down terrorist organisations secretly without being bound by law and order.

== Cast ==
- Vikram as John / Dhruv
- Ritu Varma
- Simran
- R. Parthiban
- Radikaa Sarathkumar
- Vinayakan
- Aishwarya Rajesh
- Dhivyadharshini as Madhavi
- Gautham Vasudev Menon
- V. P. Dhananjayan
- Arjun Das as voice for Darkman
- Vamsi Krishna
- Sathish Krishnan
- Munna Simon
- Salim Baig
- Maya S. Krishnan
- Abhirami Venkatachalam

== Production ==
=== Development ===
Following the successes of Kaakha Kaakha (2003) and Vaaranam Aayiram (2008), director Gautham Vasudev Menon and actor Suriya began discussions on another project featuring the duo. After rejecting two scripts including films titled Enai Noki Paayum Thota and Thuppariyum Anandhan, Suriya was impressed and accepted to work on the spy thriller film Dhruva Natchathiram, which Menon hoped to turn into a franchise. Revealed to be produced by Menon too, the team released a series of posters in April 2013 indicating that the film would feature 12 pivotal characters. The film was officially launched at the director's office in May 2013, with a few test shots also taken during the month.

A. R. Rahman was confirmed as the film's music composer, while Rajeevan and Anthony were announced as the art director and editor respectively. Menon confirmed later in the month that R. Parthiban and Simran had been added to the cast to play supporting roles. Actors Arun Vijay and Sudhanshu Pandey, were also signed on to play characters with negative shades. However, the film's first schedule was repeatedly postponed and ultimately by October 2013, Menon and Suriya parted ways citing creative differences. Suriya released a press note revealing that Menon had been tinkering the script for six months without any such progress and that he could wait no longer as he had committed to other films. He also recalled that the pair had a similar unfruitful experience when making a film titled Chennaiyil Oru Mazhaikaalam in early 2004.

=== Pre-production ===
Following the release of Yennai Arindhaal (2015), Menon revived Dhruva Natchathiram and revealed he was working on the script by March 2015. Vikram was subsequently signed for the lead role, while Nayanthara was also selected to play the leading female role. However, Vikram who signed 10 Endrathukulla and Iru Mugan (2016) opted out of the film, citing date issues. The project failed to find financiers, before he picked up pre-production work on the film again during November 2015, hoping to start the film with Jayam Ravi. Despite progress, the film did not take off as a result of Ravi's busy schedule. Menon then narrated the script to producer Kalaipuli S. Thanu, who set up a meeting for Menon to discuss the script with Rajinikanth. The actor liked the idea of the film, but later turned down the offer and chose to work with Thanu on Kabali.

In November 2016, Menon revived the project with Vikram and began working on the script again. Production began in early January 2017 in New York City, with a series of promotional posters released by the team. Harris Jayaraj who has worked on most of Gautham Menon's films, was confirmed as the composer. Anu Emmanuel was added to the cast and also took part in an initial photoshoot. A two-minute teaser was released in the same month; it was shot in fourteen hours around Manhattan, New York City with a Canon 5D SLR camera by cinematographer Jomon T. John.

The film was initially produced by Menon's Ondraga Entertainment with Escape Artists Motion Pictures and Kondaaduvom Entertainment. However, as the film languished in production hell, the other two companies dropped their names from the promotional materials. Vels Film International, a production studio led by Ishari K. Ganesh reportedly agreed to distribute and fund the project. However, it did not come into fruition. The film was later jointly produced by Oruoorileoru Film House, with Preethi Srivijayan as the executive producer.

=== Casting ===
The film began production with only Vikram and Anu Emmanuel as confirmed members of the cast in January 2017. In early February 2017, Anu Emmanuel opted out of the film citing scheduling issues following Vikram's decision to alter his schedule, so that he could simultaneously shoot for Sketch (2018). Menon signed on Ritu Varma to replace her, after being impressed by Varma's performance in the Telugu film Pelli Choopulu (2016). Aishwarya Rajesh was also then signed to portray another leading female character in the film. The team also re-signed Parthiban to act in the film, with his character tweaked from his role in the original script.

Jomon later opted out of the film during March 2017 citing scheduling conflicts and was replaced by Santhana Krishnan Ravichandran as the cinematographer, who also exited the film in June 2017. Manoj Paramahamsa, who collaborated with Menon in Vinnaithaandi Varuvaayaa (2010) and Nadunisi Naaygal (2011), subsequently replaced Santhana Krishnan as the cinematographer. During the same month, a bevy of supporting actors were signed to portray roles in the film including veteran actresses Radhika Sarathkumar and Simran, while Dhivyadharshini, was also added to the cast. Three of Menon's former proteges Vamsi Krishna, Salim Baig and Sathish Krishnan were also selected to portray supporting roles, as was Munna Simon.

In mid-April 2018, it was revealed that Malayalam actor Vinayakan was a part of the film's cast, playing the leading antagonist in the film. Menon also appeared in the film in a prominent character. Arjun Das was reported to be appearing as "Darkman", the character that was introduced in the first two-minute teaser and would be a voice-only role.

=== Filming ===
Following the shoot of the teaser in New York City, the team moved to Coonoor to begin the first schedule in late January 2017. Following a brief shoot in the town, the team moved to Chennai for a further short schedule. After a schedule break, the shoot continued intermittently throughout Chennai in early 2017 as Vikram simultaneously worked around his commitments for his other film Sketch. During the initial schedules, scenes involving Vikram, Aishwarya Rajesh and Ritu Varma were primarily shot. The makers planned to shoot two schedules abroad, after a brief break, before wrapping the schedules in Chennai and Coonoor. Despite initially wanting to film sequences in the US, the team later chose to use Eastern Europe as the main foreign backdrop for the ease of acquiring permission to shoot and sort out visas.

The shoot began in Slovenia during mid-June 2017 with Vikram and the ensemble supporting cast, before moving to Bulgaria by the end of the month. After the completion of their work in Bulgaria, the team moved to Abu Dhabi, United Arab Emirates to film scenes in the desert and worked in extremely warm temperatures. Following the end of the schedule in mid-July 2017, Menon revealed that approximately thirty more days of shoot were required. During mid-August 2017, it was reported that Vikram had resumed shooting for the film, with substantial portions being shot in Chennai. In late August 2017, the team travelled to Tbilisi, Georgia, to continue the shoot, with the ensemble cast joining the schedule. After several days of shoot in Georgia, the team were briefly left stranded after being denied permission to enter Turkey as a result of a document oversight. After two days of no shoot, they were granted permission to travel to Istanbul and continued filming. Following the schedule in Turkey, they returned to Georgia to continue the shoot for ten days.

The film subsequently experienced production hell owing to Menon's financial constraints, with several other films associated with the director such as Enai Noki Paayum Thota, Naragasooran, Nenjam Marappathillai and the eventually shelved Pon Ondru Kandein also experiencing the same. During the period of delay, a second teaser trailer was released on YouTube during June 2018. The very same month, Menon claimed that the film entered its final leg of shooting and will be completed within August 2018, although there was no information about the process. In November 2019, Menon said that the film would resume shooting patchwork sequences after his prior commitments with Joshua: Imai Pol Kaakha. However, filming was subsequently delayed due to COVID-19 pandemic and Vikram's commitments with Cobra and Mahaan. In August 2022, Menon shared a picture of himself with Vikram through social media indicating that the project was nearing completion. In February 2023, Menon resumed filming the patchwork sequences and finished the shoot the very same month. S. R. Kathir and Vishnu Dev filmed the remainder of the portions in this schedule as Paramahamsa was busy with his commitments on other projects.

=== Post-production ===
On 2 November 2019, Menon said the film had undergone post-production which would be completed within two months, though by March 2021, Vikram had not yet dubbed his lines, one of the few things needed to finish post-production. He began dubbing for his portions the following year. In July 2023, Aishwarya Rajesh's scenes were reported to be cut from the film to reduce the film's duration to its suitable length. In an October 2023 video interaction with cast member Dhivyadharshini, Menon claimed that he pursued acting for the past few years, so that he could use the remuneration for completing post-production works. In September 2023, the film was cleared by the Central Board of Film Certification with the final edit having a runtime of 145 minutes. In February 2024, Menon said that Dhruva Natchathiram was in the same universe as Joshua: Imai Pol Kaakha, and Dhivyadharshini reprises her role from that film. A scene was deleted due to its perceived similarities to a scene from Vikram (2022).

== Music ==
The film's music and background score was composed by Harris Jayaraj in his seventh collaboration with Menon, with Thamarai, Paal Dabba, Monica Perez Castillo and Aira, writing the lyrics. The film features five songs in the soundtrack, with "Oru Manam", the first song recorded for this film, released on 7 October 2020. Later, four songs were recorded after Harris' request for more musical moments in the film. Two of them—"His Name Is John" and "Naracha Mudi"—were released as singles, while the full album released on 28 October 2023 through Sony Music India.

== Marketing ==
On 22 September 2023, a 41-second teaser credited as the "Trailblazer" by the film's team was released. A video interaction between Menon and Dhivyadharshini was released on Ondraga Entertainment's YouTube channel on 13 October 2023, with him highlighting the film's production process. The film's trailer was screened along with Leo (2023) in theatres from 19 October, and debuted through social media platforms on the occasion of Vijayadashami (24 October 2023). PVR INOX announced that they will be distributing special popcorn tubs labelled with stills featuring Vikram, in order to promote the film, at all of its multiplex chains through Tamil Nadu.

== Release ==
Initially announced for an August 2017 release, the film faced numerous delays. Menon then hoped for a late 2018 release, but this did not materialise due to his production house's financial constraints, which also affected his other projects.

In mid-2020, amidst a wave of direct-to-streaming releases due to the COVID-19 pandemic, Menon affirmed that Dhruva Natchathiram was intended for a theatrical release, calling it an "event film bringing audiences back to theatres". By mid-2021, reports emerged that Menon had decided to split the film into two parts due to its length of over four hours. This was partially confirmed in April 2023, when a new poster revealed the subtitle Chapter One – Yuddha Kaandam.

In September 2023, the production house announced a release date of 24 November 2023. However, the day before its planned debut, the release was postponed indefinitely due to unresolved financial issues. The Madras High Court had asked Menon to deposit ₹8 crore (equivalent to ₹8.7 crore or US$910,000 in 2026) to ensure a "smooth release", which did not happen. Further legal troubles arose on 7 December, when the court restrained the film's release for another two weeks over unpaid dues. Producer K. Rajan estimated the total debt of Menon to be over ₹60 crore (US$6.2 million).

In January 2024, the makers announced a tentative February 2024 release, which did not occur. In January 2025, Menon stated that many of the film's issues were resolved and aimed to release it within a few months. That June, Menon vowed not to commit to new projects until the film was released and said the film's issues were still being resolved, hoping for a launch by July or August 2025. In January 2026, he reiterated that the issues were still being resolved, but audiences could expect an official announcement from him soon. That March, he expressed hope it would release after the Tamil Nadu elections.

On 24 April 2026, during a hearing held at the Madras High Court, the film's investors agreed to permit its release if revenue was "routed through an escrow account". The court soon cleared the film's release, permitting it to release "on or before June 15", and a bank account named "Kondaduvom Entertainment" was opened, with a dedicated lawyer hired to supervise the revenue earned through this account. However, after two other investors intervened, Menon asked the court in mid-June to further hold up the film's release by at least 30 days to clear their debts. Subsequently, the court extended the deadline to 31 July, then to 30 September at Menon's request, and later 31 October after Menon revealed he found an investor willing to facilitate the film's release before said date.

== See also ==
- List of films with the longest production time
