= Sometimes (film) =

2018 film by Priyadarshan

- International poster
- Directed by: Priyadarshan
- Written by: Priyadarshan; Abilash Nair (screenplay); Vijay (dialogues)
- Produced by: Isari Ganesh; A. L. Azhagappan; Prabhu Deva; Radhika Chaudhari
- Starring: Prakash Raj; Sriya Reddy; Ashok Selvan
- Cinematography: Sameer Thahir
- Edited by: Beena Paul
- Music by: Ilaiyaraaja
- Production companies: Think Big Studios; Prabhu Deva Studios
- Distributed by: Netflix
- Release date: 1 May 2018
- Running time: 92 minutes
- Country: India
- Language: Tamil

Sometimes (Tamil: Sila Samayangalil) is a 2018 Indian Tamil-language psychological drama film, written and directed by Priyadarshan. Produced by Ishari K. Ganesh, Prabhu Deva and A. L. Azhagappan, the film features Prakash Raj, Sriya Reddy and Ashok Selvan. The music was composed by Ilaiyaraaja and the cinematographer was Sameer Thahir.

The film was released on 1 May 2018 on Netflix. It was among the top ten shortlisted films for the 74th Golden Globe Awards, but was not nominated.

== Plot ==
The story follows seven strangers who are waiting for their HIV test results at a private clinic.

Thrown together by circumstance, most are initially reluctant to reveal anything about themselves, eventually swapping stories of the events that have led to their suspecting that they have HIV. Krishnamurthy, an elderly married man, had sex with a prostitute while on a work trip to Kolkata a few years earlier and learned that the colleague who encouraged him to do so died of AIDS recently, leading Krishnamurthy to get tested himself. Balamurugan, a younger man, had a premarital affair with a nurse working in an AIDS ward who succumbed to AIDS herself. Now married and with a baby on the way, he is concerned and wants to rule out the possibility of AIDS. Sheila George, a young woman on the cusp of marriage, was raped by a stranger while on a train journey and now, engaged to her childhood friend, wants to ensure she is not putting him at risk. There are also four others: a senior policeman Karunakaran who has been frequenting prostitutes; a lawyer who received a blood transfusion which could have been infected; a real estate agent who ran over an AIDS patient while driving under the influence and took him to the hospital while both he and the victim bled on each other, potentially leading to infection; and a college-going boy who shared a syringe with a fellow drug addicted college goer, who died from AIDS.

The test result is available no earlier than 5PM in the evening, leading to anxious moments as the group waits. Balamurugan, listening in on the receptionist's impassioned phone calls with her mother, realizes that she is in dire need of money. He shares this information with the others, and they bribe the receptionist to reveal their results earlier. After taking their money and attempting to get the lab technician to find out the results, all she shares with the group is that one of the seven has tested positive and that she does not know which one. Anxiety sets in as each of the waiting strangers worry that it may be them, while some remain in denial.

When the results arrive, the first five to receive their results jubilantly test negative for HIV, leaving only Krishnamurthy and Balamurugan to receive their results momentarily. Finally, Balamurugan also tests negative and the inconsolable Krishnamurthy staggers back to his seat, realizing the implications for himself and trying to wrap his head around the implications of his disease on his family and the ostracism they will likely face. As the lab closes down for the day, the technician apologizes to the receptionist for being unable to uncover the test results ahead as the wary practice doctor was watching him, but the receptionist tells him she managed the group by lying that one of them tested positive while in reality all seven tested negative. Unaware of this and still believing he has tested positive, Krishnamurthy is found to have died of shock while still seated in the waiting area.

The movie closes with some statistics on the AIDS epidemic and a request to treat patients with compassion.

== Cast ==
- Prakash Raj as Krishnamoorthy
- Sriya Reddy as Deepa
- Ashok Selvan as Bala Murugan
- Nassar as Doctor
- Varun as Vivek
- M. S. Bhaskar as Raghavan
- Anjali Rao as Sheila George
- Shanmugarajan as ACP Karunakaran
- Pandian as Vignesh
- Ashrita Kingini as Nurse
- Saivam Ravi as Lab Technician
- KPY Bala as Card betting game player

== Production ==
Following of the release of De Dana Dan in December 2009, Priyadarshan announced that he was working on the script of a film on AIDS with Aamir Khan in the lead role. The pair regularly discussed the script and Khan had agreed to fund the project, with Priyadarshan revealing he was still scripting the film in February 2011. However, the director took longer than expected to complete the script and, by May 2012, Khan and Priyadarshan chose to shelve the project. The director considered bringing in Akshay Kumar to reprise the lead role instead, but the project failed to materialise.

In July 2015, Priyadarshan announced that he would instead make the film in Tamil with Prakash Raj and Sriya Reddy . Santosh Sivan was chosen as the film's cinematographer, with Beena Paul and Sabu Cyril as editor and art director respectively. He also revealed that the film would be produced by his former associate A. L. Vijay's Think Big Studios and that it would be made at a cost of 20 million rupees, with the cast and crew getting a salary but not at their market rate. Prabhu Deva later announced that he would co-produce the film with Amala Paul, who was assigned as the film's main production representative by Think Big Studios. Vijay also suggested that Nassar and Ashok Selvan could be cast in the film, and Priyadarshan took them on. Sameer Thahir later replaced Sivan, a few days before the start of filming. The team began filming without an assigned music composer and later signed Ilaiyaraaja to work on the film's background score. The film had no songs, a notable rarity for Tamil cinema.

The team shot portions in August 2015, with Prakash Raj revealing that the film had been titled Sila Nerangalil. The film was shot in 18 days with the artists recording their voices on location by sound recording engineer Prince Anselm. After production was completed, Amala Paul announced that the film had been retitled Sila Samayangalil. For international audiences, the film was titled Sometimes.

== Reception ==
Ashameera Aiyappan of The Indian Express said, "Sila Samayangalil, for me, was not just about HIV. It was about the solace we sometimes find in strangers, about the complex nature of our species and our problems and the uncharacteristic decisions we tend to take sometimes. Sila Samayangalil — the film couldn’t have found a better name." Behindwoods gave 3.25/5 stars and said, "Sila Samayangalil is one of those movies where silence is put to best use. Priyadarshan makes you realize the power of silence through this captivating and breathtaking awareness film." Priyanka Sundar of Hindustan Times gave 3/5 stars and said, "Sila Samayangalil is sometimes poetic and sometimes dark. What it is not, is a preachy awareness campaign."

== Release ==
Sometimes was released on 1 May 2018 by Netflix.
