= Kutty Story =

2021 Indian anthology film

- Poster
- Directed by: Gautham Vasudev Menon; Vijay; Venkat Prabhu; Nalan Kumarasamy
- Written by: Gautham Vasudev Menon; Vijay; Venkat Prabhu; Nalan Kumarasamy
- Produced by: Ishari K. Ganesh
- Starring: Gautham Vasudev Menon; Amala Paul; Vinoth Kishan; Amitash Pradhan; Megha Akash; Sangeetha Krish; Varun; Sakshi Agarwal; Vijay Sethupathi; Aditi Balan
- Cinematography: Manoj Paramahamsa; Arvind Krishna; Sakthi Saravanan; N. Shanmuga Sundaram
- Edited by: Anthony; Praveen K. L.; A. Sreekar Prasad
- Music by: Karthik; Madhu. R; Premgi Amaren; Edwin Louis
- Production company: Vels Film International
- Release date: 12 February 2021
- Running time: 130 minutes
- Country: India
- Language: Tamil

Kutty Story (transl. Short story) is a 2021 Indian Tamil-language romantic anthology film, consisting of four short film segments directed by Gautham Vasudev Menon, Vijay, Venkat Prabhu and Nalan Kumarasamy and produced by Ishari K. Ganesh under the banner of Vels Film International. The film stars Menon, Amala Paul, Vinoth Kishan, Amitash Pradhan, Megha Akash, Sunaina, Varun, Sakshi Agarwal, Vijay Sethupathi and Aditi Balan. The film was released on 12 February 2021.

== List of short films ==
Title	Director	Writer	Cinematographer	Music	Editor
Edhirpaara Muththam	Gautham Vasudev Menon	Gautham Vasudev Menon	Manoj Paramahamsa	Karthik	Anthony
Avanum Naanum	Vijay	Vijay	Arvind Krishna	Madhu. R	Anthony
Lokham	Venkat Prabhu	Venkat Prabhu	Sakthi Saravanan	Premgi Amaren	Praveen K. L.
Aadal Paadal	Nalan Kumarasamy	Nalan Kumarasamy	N. Shanmuga Sundaram	Edwin Louis	A. Sreekar Prasad

== Plot ==
=== Edhirpaara Muththam (Unexpected kiss) ===
Aadhi (Gautham Vasudev Menon) and Mrinalini (Amala Paul) are engineering students and best friends. Though they get along well and spend most of their time together, they believe that there is an invisible line between love and friendship and they should not cross it for any reason. Aadhi insists the same to his friends and says that a man and woman can indeed be just friends no matter what. However, the events that unfold in the later stage of his life destroy his theory at least as far as Mrinalini is concerned and make him realize that there is love between the two.

=== Avanum Naanum (He and I) ===
Preethi (Megha Akash), a final-year student, discovers that she is three months pregnant and informs her boyfriend Vikram (Amitash Pradhan) about the same. Within a few minutes, unfortunate circumstances put Vikram in non-reachable mode, forcing Preethi to seek an abortion. Does destiny help her live with her loved one or put her in trouble?

=== Lokham (World) ===
Adam (Varun) is a gamer who tries to find the whereabouts of his girlfriend Eve (Sangeetha), whom he met in a video game. The film begins with an interview of Adam, one of the top gamers in the city, and the first to complete the game called Logam. He credits his girlfriend for all the success and says that he dedicates the victory to her. But who is this girlfriend and what does she do? Does this girl exist only in the game or is she real and in love with him as well?

=== Aadal Paadal (Dance and song) ===
Ninja Manick (Vijay Sethupathi) and Kuchu (Aditi Balan) are a happily married couple. However, they go through a bad phase in life after knowing that Manick is cheating on Kuchu. The writing is typical of Nalan's films - characters who are on the grey side of the law, twists where you least expect them, and a bizarre plot. Kuchu impersonates her husband's paramour to confirm that he is indeed having an affair.

== Cast ==
Edhirpaara Mutham	Avanum Naanum	Lokham	Aadal Paadal
Gautham Vasudev Menon as Aadhi; Vinoth Kishan as younger Aadhi; Amala Paul as Mirnalini; Robo Shankar as Prabhakar; M. J. Shriram as Aadhi's friend; Abhishek Vinod as Aadhi's friend; Manju Narain as Priya	Megha Akash as Preethi; Amitash Pradhan as Vikram; Ayraa as Shruthi; Suhasini Raju Kumaran as Preethi's sister; Bujji Babu as Hotel Manager; Kirupa as Preethi's mother; Smrithi as Vikram's mother; Parimala as Vikram's aunt; Preethi; Baby Hari Krishanan	Varun as Adam Vice; Sangeetha as Eve; Sakshi Agarwal as Maya; Luthfudeen as "Naanum Oru Gamer" VJ	Vijay Sethupathi as Ninja Manick; Aditi Balan as Kuchu; Pradeep; Andrea; Sugaranolbu Khan; Karunakaran (voice only); G. M. Sundar (voice only)

== Production ==
On 2 September 2020, Vels Film International announced that they were producing an anthology film with directors Gautham Vasudev Menon, A. L. Vijay, Venkat Prabhu and Nalan Kumarasamy being brought on board for the project. The same day, the studio revealed the conceptual promo of the film was titled as Kutty Love Story. The shooting for the film already wrapped up before the announcement of the series, but the makers did not decipher the details of the lead cast and crew. On 6 September, the makers revealed the official cast and crew members with Gautham Menon, Amala Paul, Vijay Sethupathi, Megha Akash, Amitash Pradhan, Sakshi Agarwal and Varun being roped in for the film. Out of the four films Prabhu's anthology is said to be made in a science-fiction angle with computer graphics being involved.

== Soundtrack ==
The film features a promotional single titled "Maayangal" composed by Karthik and written by Vivek, which was sung by Karthik, Nakul Abhyankar and Krishna.K. It was released on 10 February 2021. Another song "Nee Naan Nee" composed by Karthik, was featured in the anthology's first segment Edhirpaara Muththam. The song written by Madhan Karky and sung by Rajaganapathy was released on 22 February 2021. There is also Navz-47 song on the last story.

No.	Title	Lyrics	Singer(s)	Length
1.	"Maayangal"	Vivek	Karthik, Nakul Abhyankar, Krishna.K	2:51
2.	"Nee Naan Nee"	Madhan Karky	Rajaganapathy	2:39
3.	"Nee Puthiradi"	Madhan Karky	S.P.Charan	2:13

== Release ==
The makers discussed with leading OTT platforms to distribute the film, in order to schedule for a release in December 2020. However, it was later announced that the film will be scheduled for a theatrical release during the Valentine's Day weekend, on 12 February 2021.

== Reception ==
M. Suganth of The Times of India gave 2.5 out of 5 and stated "Except for Nalan Kumarasamy and Gautham Menon's works, the anthology is underwhelming." Ranjani Krishnakumar of Firstpost gave 3.5 out of 5 and wrote "Within the constraints of an urban, middle class, heterosexual romance, Kutty Story is an interesting mix of shorts." Srinivasa Ramanujam of The Hindu wrote "Nalan Kumarasamy and Gautham Menon deliver what is expected of them in this Tamil anthology, but there’s not much beyond that." Haricharan Pudipeddi of Hindustan Times reviewed "Kutty Story is a cocktail of love stories with some quirky twists. Except for Nalan’s refreshing short on male insecurity in a marriage, other shorts come across as promising but never work wholesomely."

Sify gave a rating of 3 out of 5 stating "Kutty Story's best episode belongs to Nalan Kumarasamy but the rest of the stories fail to excite us much."
