= Vels Institute of Science, Technology & Advanced Studies =

University in Chennai, India

Coordinates: 12.9586°N 80.1601°E

- Former names: Vels College of Science (1993–2008); Vels College of Pharmacy (1992–2008); Vels College of Physiotherapy (1993–2008); Vels Srinivasa College of Engineering & Technology (2001–2008); Vels Academy of Maritime Education & Training (2004–2008)
- Motto: Knowledge Is Power
- Type: Private
- Established: 1992; 34 years ago
- Academic affiliations: UGC, NAAC
- Chancellor: Dr. Ishari K. Ganesh
- Vice-Chancellor: Dr. T. Sasipraba
- Students: 10,000
- Location: Chennai, Tamil Nadu, India
- Website: www.velsuniv.ac.in

Vels Institute of Science, Technology & Advanced Studies (VISTAS) is an institute of higher education located in Pallavaram, Chennai, Tamil Nadu, India. It was established in 1992 and granted deemed university status in 2008 by University Grants Commission under section 3 of UGC Act 1956.

== Schools ==
VISTAS has established following schools:

- School of Engineering
- School of Pharmacy
- School of Hotel & Catering Management
- School of Management & Commerce
- School of Maritime Studies
- School of Ocean Engineering
- School of Computing Sciences
- School of Law
- School of Physiotherapy
- School of Life Sciences
- School of Basic Sciences
- School of Mass Communication
- School of Languages
- School of Education
- School of Music & Fine Arts
- Department of Aviation
- Vels Medical College and Hospital

== Campus & infrastructure ==
=== Campus ===
Campus is located in the heart of the city in Pallavaram with about 29.13 acres. It is the only university campus which has its main campus within the city.

=== Hostel ===
There are separate hostels for men and women on the campus. A laundry facility is also available to the students for a charge. A qualified medical attendant is available at the campus. Medical and hospital facilities are available at Pallavaram and the cost is met by the students. Mess and canteen facility are also available.,

== Research centres ==
The following research centres are established at VISTAS to conduct research.

- Centre of Advanced R&D
- Centre for Fish Immunology
- VISTAS Technology Business Incubation Centre
- Central Instrumentation Laboratory
- Centre for Energy Alternative Fuels
- Centre IOT Road Safety Healthcare
- Artificial Intelligence Research Lab
- Centre Automation Power Conservation
- Centre for Materials Research
- VISTAS SPS lab
- Elephant Research Centre

== Rankings ==
College and university rankings

Pharmacy – India
- NIRF (2024): 64

Vels Institute of Science, Technology & Advanced Studies was ranked 64 in India by the National Institutional Ranking Framework (NIRF) pharmacy ranking in 2024.

== Notable alumni ==
- Anjali Rao, actress
- Abinash Ganapathi, model, Mr. Chennai 2018
