= Seeru =

2020 Indian film directed by Rathina Siva

- Theatrical release poster
- Directed by: Rathina Shiva
- Written by: Rathina Shiva
- Produced by: Ishari K. Ganesh
- Starring: Jiiva; Riya Suman; Navdeep; Varun; Gayathri Krishnaa
- Cinematography: Prasanna Kumar
- Edited by: Lawrence Kishore
- Music by: D. Imman
- Production company: Vels Film International
- Release date: 7 February 2020
- Running time: 124 minutes
- Country: India
- Language: Tamil

Seeru (transl. Roar) is a 2020 Indian Tamil-language action drama film written and directed by Rathina Shiva. The film stars Jiiva, Riya Suman, Navdeep, Varun, and Gayathri Krishnaa in the lead roles. D. Imman composes music for the film and the film is bankrolled by Ishari K. Ganesh under his production studio Vels Film International. Principal photography commenced on 4 December 2018. The film was released on 7 February 2020 and opened to predomimately positive reviews, particularly praising Jiiva's performance despite the age old storyline.

== Plot ==
The film begins with two girls driving on the road when two policemen stop them, who then proceed to attempt to rape them. One of the girls sends a voice message to a WhatsApp group, explaining their situation. Manimaran hears the voice message and rescues them. He is from a neighbouring place called Mayiladuthurai (erstwhile Mayavaram), where he runs a local TV channel called Kokkarako TV. The MLA opposes it and keeps getting outsmarted by Maran. Exasperated, he pays a local goon named Vyasarpadi Malli to kill him. Malli reaches Maran's home, where his pregnant sister Ilakkiya goes into labour.

Malli takes Ilakkiya to the hospital and admits her while providing her blood. Maran reaches the hospital and finds that his sister is out of danger and has given birth to a boy. Ilakkiya asks Maran to find the person who saved her and bring him to her so she can properly thank him. Maran discovers that the person is Malli, who had threatened to kill him. Maran keeps calling and asking to meet him. Eventually, he finds Malli on the verge of death after being backstabbed by his associates. Maran beats up the associates who were nearby, and Maran admits Malli into Laksha Hospitals. It turns out that Malli's associates tortured Malli at the orders of Ashok Mithran, a leading advocate who got stabbed in court and who wants to know who stabbed him. He planned to torture Malli since he knew who did it. Mithran sends more goons to all hospitals, where Maran beats them up and admits them to Aruna Hospitals. Mithran deduces that Malli is in Laksha Hospitals and sends some goons there. Maran uses a walkie-talkie that a police officer left in a hurry in a restaurant, masquerading as a police officer. He eventually goes with the goons. Mithran instructs the goons to stand near a phone booth where Malli was last contacted. A girl calls Malli's phone, which Mithran tracks, and he orders his goons to kill her. Simultaneously, the MLA sends a photo of Maran to the goon that he is with. A fight erupts between Maran and the goons, and Maran emerges victorious. He saves the girls, who narrate their story to him.

Past: The state topper of their village is Pavithra, a close friend of the girls. The press interviewed her. She announces that she wants to become a lawyer and eradicate all wrongs in the legal system. At the behest of a reporter, she names some cases that she will account for. Mithran heads these mentioned cases. She further insults Mithran on live television, causing him to get enraged. He sponsors many items for her, including theme park tickets. Mithran kills Pavithra at the theme park and leaves her body outside. Her friends later discover her lifeless, bloodied corpse. After her death, he indirectly forces her grandfather to state that she died from a fall from the Ferris wheel. This news enrages her friends, who disguise themselves as lawyers and stab Mithran in court; Malli sees them and lets them go. They contact him and tell him their story. He agrees to help them before his associates torture him.

Present: The story moves Maran and offers to help them. However, the police arrest him for stealing the walkie-talkie. But the policeman lets him go when it is revealed that the girl he had saved at the start is the officer's wife. Mithran takes the girls, and Maran goes to rescue them. A fight between the two breaks out, where Maran defeats Mithran and lets the girls finish him. The film ends with Malli meeting Maran's sister and Maran's girlfriend, Vasuki.

== Cast ==
- Jiiva as Manimaran
- Riya Suman as Vasuki
- Navdeep as Ashok Mithran
- Varun as Vyasarpadi Malli
- Gayathri Krishnaa as Ilakkiya
- Sathish as Gopi, Manimaran's friend
- R. N. R. Manohar as MLA
- Dr. Soori
- Chandni as Pavithra
- Swaminathan as Priest
- Kadhal Saravanan
- Jerald Milton as Dubai Mapillai, Manimaran's friend and brother-in-law
- Sekar as Inspector Kishore
- BlackSheep Shamni as one of Schoolgirls (Uncredited)
- Ival Nandhini (BlackSheep) as one of the Schoolgirls (Uncredited)

== Production ==
Rathina Shiva, who is known for his work in Rekka, initially had discussions with actor Silambarasan during March 2018 to team up for a film and reports revealed that STR liked the script of the director with speculations and buzz were created among the audience about the possible shooting of the film within few days following the announcement. However, it was revealed that STR could not progress on the script due to other pending works, and later, the filmmakers hired Jiiva to replace STR as the lead actor for the untitled film.

The shooting of the film commenced in December 2018, and the film was officially launched by Vijay Sethupathi. The filmmakers cast Riya Suman on her Tamil acting debut opposite Jiiva. Navdeep was hired into play the role of antagonist. The film was titled as Seeru in January 2019.

== Soundtrack ==
Seeru

Soundtrack album by D. Imman
- Released: 2 February 2020
- Recorded: 2019
- Venue: Chennai
- Studio: D.Imman’s Sound Factory
- Genre: Feature film soundtrack
- Length: 20:58
- Label: Sony Music India
- Producer: D. Imman

D. Imman chronology
Namma Veettu Pillai (2019)	Seeru (2020)	Bhoomi (2021)

The music is composed by D. Imman, and released on Sony Music India label.

Track list
No.	Title	Lyrics	Singer(s)	Length
1.	"Vaa Vasuki"	Viveka	Shivam Mahadevan	4:19
2.	"Sevvanthiye"	Parvathy	Nochipatti Thirumoorthi	4:00
3.	"Vaasana Poochenda"	Parvathy	Rajaganapathy	1:29
4.	"Kannaala Poduraaley"	Viveka, RJ Vijay	Nakash Aziz & RJ Vijay	4:36
5.	"Sevvanthiye (Female Version)"	Parvathy	Vaikom Vijayalakshmi	3:59
6.	"Ignite the Fire (Theme)" (Instrumental)		D.Imman	2:35
Total length:				20:58

== Reception ==
The Times of India wrote "Even though it starts off as a mass hero movie, Seeru turns out to be a solid masala movie that nicely balances sentiment and action". The Hindu wrote "Seeru comes across as a film that’s at least a decade old, in terms of its outdated presentation and over-the-top sequences [..] But the surprises within the traditional masala format, and an earnest performance by Jiiva, keep it engaging". Cinema Express rated the film 1.5/5 stars and wrote wrote, "Making a ‘masala film’ doesn’t mean that one can sell anything and expect the audience to lap it up. The lack of coherence or effort in this film is blasphemous. And it is just disheartening to see able actors like Jiiva in such projects". Firstpost wrote "On the whole, Seeru is an unpretentious regular commercial cocktail and watchable to an extent if you have two hours to while away." Sify rated 3 out of 5 stars stating "Seeru starring Jiiva, Varun and Riya is a commercial timepass entertainer that is worth a watch".

== See also ==
- Rekka (2016)
