= Puppy (2019 film) =

2019 film directed by Nattu Dev

- Theatrical release poster
- Directed by: Nattu Dev
- Written by: Nattu Dev
- Produced by: Ishari K. Ganesh
- Starring: Varun; Samyuktha Hegde; Yogi Babu
- Cinematography: Deepak Kumar Padhy
- Edited by: Richie
- Music by: Dharan Kumar
- Production company: Vels Film International
- Release date: 11 October 2019
- Running time: 109 minutes
- Country: India
- Language: Tamil

Puppy is a 2019 Indian Tamil-language comedy drama film written and directed by Nattu Dev (credited as Morattu Single) in his directorial debut. The film starring Varun in his debut as a lead actor, Samyuktha Hegde and Yogi Babu is produced by Ishari K. Ganesh. The music for the film is composed by Dharan Kumar. The film had its theatrical release on 11 October 2019.

== Plot ==
Final year college student Prabhu has a strong urge to lose his virginity and his senior guides him. Prabhu falls in love with his classmate Ramya. His sexual curiosity lands him in trouble when he and Ramya have pre-marital sex. He gets biggest the shock of his life when he learns that Ramya shows positive signs of pregnancy. His pet dog puppy is mostly ill, which worries both Prabhu and Ramya. How will he fix the things forms crux of the story.

== Cast ==
- Varun as Prabhu
- Samyuktha Hegde as Ramya
- Yogi Babu as Senior
- Rajendran
- G. Marimuthu as Prabhu's father
- Nithya Ravindran as Prabhu's mother
- Anbarasan
- Risha
- R. S. Shivaji as doctor
- Tigergarden Thangadurai
- Sampath Ram
- TSR Srinivasan in a special appearance

== Soundtrack ==
No.	Title	Singer(s)	Length
1.	"Anji Manikku"	Yuvan Shankar Raja, Shashaa Tirupati	05:16
2.	"En Kai Enakku"	Dharan Kumar, Sandy	03:30
3.	"Soththumoottai"	Dharan Kumar, RJ Balaji	04:01
4.	"Superstar"	Anirudh Ravichander, MCD, Dharan Kumar	03:49
5.	"Uyirae Vaa"	Gautham Vasudev Menon, Dharan Kumar, Alisha Thomas	04:58
6.	"Yogi Babu (Theme)"	MCD, Dharan Kumar	01:51
