= Isari Velan =

Indian politician

Member of Tamil Nadu legislative assembly for Radhakrishnan Nagar
- In office 15 May 1977 – 27 September 1980
- Constituency: Radhakrishnan Nagar

Personal details
- Born: 5 December 1941 North Arcot, Madras Presidency, Tamil Nadu
- Died: 14 May 1987 (aged 45) Chennai, India
- Party: All India Anna Dravida Munnetra Kazhagam
- Spouse: Pushpa Velan
- Relations: Varun (Grandson)
- Children: 3 (Including Ishari K. Ganesh)
- Profession: Actor, politician, social worker

Isari R. Velan was an Indian actor, politician and former Member of the Legislative Assembly of Tamil Nadu. His daughter Azaghu Tamil Selvi is a doctor who is also an Educationist. His son Ishari K. Ganesh is an educationist who acted in few films and also produced and distributed films. Velan's grandson Varun is also an actor who acted in films like Thalaivaa, Vanamagan and Bogan.

== Political career ==
He was elected to the Tamil Nadu legislative assembly from Dr. Radhakrishnan Nagar constituency as an Anna Dravida Munnetra Kazhagam candidate in 1977 election.

== Filmography ==
This is a partial filmography. You can expand it.

Year	Film	Role	Notes
1970	Enga Mama	Shopkeeper	
1970	Snegithi		
1971	Rickshawkaran		
1972	Naan Yen Pirandhen		
1972	Idhaya Veenai		
1973	Ulagam Sutrum Valiban		
1973	Veettukku Vandha Marumagal		
1974	Netru Indru Naalai	Reporter	
1974	Sirithu Vazha Vendum		
1975	Idhayakkani		
1975	Pallandu Vazhga		
1975	Hotel Sorgam		
1976	Uzhaikum Karangal		
1976	Needhikku Thalaivanangu		
1977	Navarathinam		
1978	Madhuraiyai Meetta Sundharapandiyan		
1978	Mangudi Minor		
1979	Kandhar Alangaram		
1979	Malligai Meni		
1979	Naan Nandri Solven		
1979	Pappathi		
1979	Siri Siri Mama		
1979	Sri Rama Jayam		
1979	Anbil Alaigal		
1979	Alangari		
1980	Othaiyadi Pathayile		
1981	Kannitheevu		
1981	Sorgathi Thirappu Vizha		
1981	Ranuva Veeran		
1982	Simla Special		
1982	Katrukenna Veli		
1982	Thanikkattu Raja		
1982	Asthivaram		
1983	Sattam Sirikirathu		
1983	Brahmacharigal		
1983	Thanga Magan		
1984	Idhu Enga Boomi		
1984	Sirai	Marudhu	
1985	Aduthathu Albert		
1985	Pagal Nilavu	Mudhaliyar	
