= Sathish Krishnan =

Indian actor

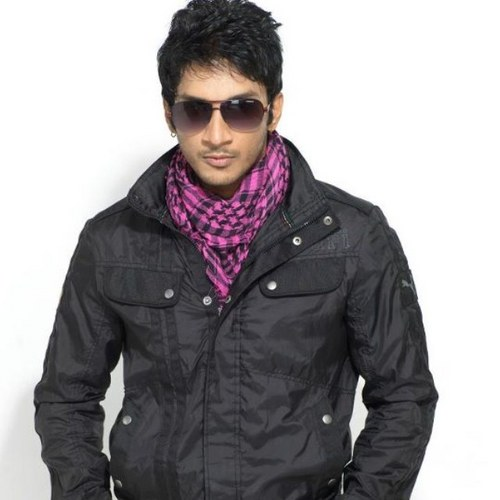
- Sathish during shoot
- Occupations: Actor, director, dance choreographer
- Years active: 2007-present
- Spouse: Swathi
- Children: 1

Sathish Krishnan (also credited as Sathish) is an Indian dance choreographer, actor and film director, who has worked in predominantly Tamil films.

== Career ==
After winning the first season of the reality dance show, Maanada Mayilada, Sathish was first seen portraying Vinay Rai's friend in Jeeva's Unnale Unnale (2007). In Vaaranam Aayiram, released in 2008, Sathish played a small but memorable role as Suriya’s school friend. His association with renowned director Gautham Vasudev Menon led to an opportunity to act in Achcham Enbadhu Madamaiyada (2016), where he portrayed Silambarasan’s friend. Notably, Sathish also showcased his choreography skills by handling all the songs in the same film. He is the recipient of National Film Award for Best Choreography for Thiruchitrambalam (2022). Sathish made his directorial debut with the romantic comedy film Kiss (2025), starring Kavin.

== Filmography ==
=== As choreographer ===
Year	Film	Song(s)	Language	Notes
2013	Thalaivaa	All songs	Tamil	
2013	Sutta Kadhai	All songs	Tamil	
2015	Darling	All songs	Tamil	
2015	Vaalu	All songs	Tamil	
2016	Achcham Enbadhu Madamaiyada	All songs	Tamil	
2016	Sahasam Swasaga Sagipo	"Showkilla", "Kannulo Munde"	Telugu	
2018	Koova Koova	All songs	Tamil	Ondraga Original music video
2019	Irupathiyonnaam Noottaandu	All songs	Malayalam	
2019	Enai Noki Paayum Thota	All songs	Tamil	
2019	Hero	All songs	Tamil	
2021	Master	All songs	Tamil	
2022	RRR	"Dosti"	Telugu	
2022	The Warriorr	"Dhada Dhada"	Telugu / Tamil	
2022	Thiruchitrambalam	"Thaai Kelavi", "Megham Karukkatha"	Tamil	Won—National Film Award for Best Choreography
2022	Naane Varuvean	All songs	Tamil	
2022	Prince	"Jessica"	Tamil	
2023	Das Ka Dhamki	"O Dollar Pillagaa"	Telugu	
2023	Boo	"Halloween"	Tamil; Telugu	
2024	Ayalaan	"Suro Suro"	Tamil	

=== As actor ===
- Note: all films are in Tamil, unless otherwise noted.

Year	Film	Role	Notes
2007	Unnale Unnale	Sathish	
2008	Vaaranam Aayiram	Sathish	
2012	Neethaane En Ponvasantham	Dancer	
2013	Thalaivaa	Dance Crew Member	
2013	Ainthu Ainthu Ainthu		Special appearance
2014	Endrendrum	Charles	Lead Role
2015	Uppu Karuvaadu	Jagan	
2015	Naanum Rowdy Dhaan		Special appearance
2016	Tharkappu	Jai	
2016	Achcham Enbadhu Madamaiyada	Mahesh	
2016	Sahasam Swasaga Sagipo		Telugu film; special appearance in "Shokilla" song
2020	Irandam Kuththu		Special appearance
2022	Beast	Ramachandran (Raama)	
2022	Prince	Anbarasan's friend	
2023	Soppana Sundari	Naresh	
2024	Brother	Dr. Vinay	
TBA	Dhruva Natchathiram		Unreleased film

=== As director ===
Year	Film	Notes
2025	Kiss	Directorial debut
