= Gautham Vasudev Menon =

Indian film director, film producer, screenwriter and actor

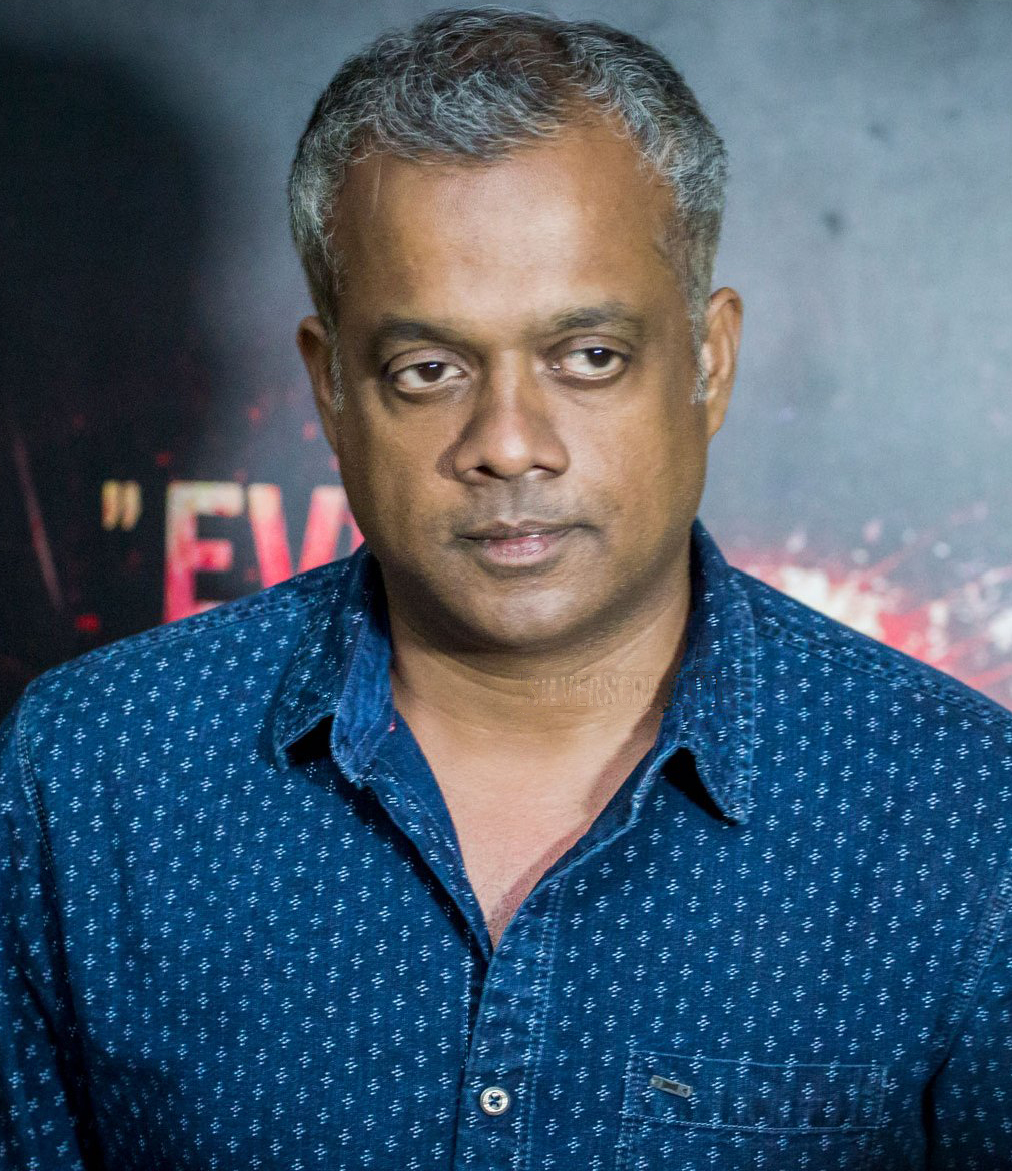
- Menon in 2017
- Born: 25 February 1973 (age 53); Ottapalam, Kerala, India
- Education: Mookambigai College of Engineering (B.E. in Mechanical Engineering)
- Occupations: Actor; Film director; Film producer; Playback singer; Screenwriter; Composer
- Years active: 1995–present
- Honours: Kalaimamani (2021)

Gautham Vasudev Menon (born 25 February 1973), also known by his initials as GVM, is an Indian film director, screenwriter, film producer and actor who predominantly works in Tamil film industry. He has also directed Telugu, Hindi and Malayalam films that were mostly either simultaneously shot with or remakes of his own Tamil films. He also has acted in some Malayalam and Telugu films. He has won two National Film Awards, three Nandi Awards and one Tamil Nadu State Film Award.

Many of his films have been both critically acclaimed and commercially successful, most notably his romantic films Minnale (2001), Vaaranam Aayiram (2008), Vinnaithaandi Varuvaayaa (2010), his cop action thrillers Kaakha Kaakha (2003), Vettaiyaadu Vilaiyaadu (2006), Yennai Arindhaal (2015) and his gangster drama Vendhu Thanindhathu Kaadu (2022). His 2008 Tamil film, Vaaranam Aayiram won the National Film Award for Best Feature Film in Tamil. Menon produces films through his film production company named Photon Kathaas. His production Thanga Meenkal (2013) won the National Film Award for Best Feature Film in Tamil.

== Early life and education ==
Gautham Vasudev Menon was born on 25 February 1973 in Ottapalam, Palakkad, Kerala. His father, Prabha Krishnan, is a Malayali, and his mother is a Tamilian. He grew up in Anna Nagar, Chennai.

Menon did his schooling at the Madras Christian College Higher Secondary School, Chennai. He then completed a bachelor's degree in Mechanical Engineering from the Mookambigai College of Engineering, Pudukkottai.

== Film career ==
=== Early work (2001) ===
Menon's time at university inspired him to write the lead roles of Minnale, Vaaranam Aayiram, Vinnaithaandi Varuvaayaa, Neethaane En Ponvasantham and Enai Noki Paayum Thota who were students in the same course. During the period, he was inspired by films such as Dead Poets Society (1989) and Nayakan (1987) and expressed his desire to his parents to change his career path and become a filmmaker. His mother insisted that he become an ad filmmaker by shooting various commercials and he took an apprenticeship under filmmaker Rajiv Menon. He went on to work as an assistant director for Minsara Kanavu (1997), in which he also appeared in a cameo role.

Menon launched a Tamil romance film O Lala in 2000 with the project eventually changing producers and titles into Minnale (2001) with Madhavan, who was at the beginning of his career, being signed on to portray the lead role. About the making of the film, Menon revealed that he found it difficult as the team was new to the industry with only the editor of the film, Suresh Urs, being an experienced technician. Menon came under further pressure when Madhavan insisted that the film's story was narrated to the actor's mentor, Mani Ratnam, to identify if the film was a positive career move. Despite initial reservations, Menon did so and Ratnam was unimpressed; however, Menon has since cited that he thought that Madhavan "felt sorry" and later agreed to continue with the project. The film also featured Abbas and newcomer Reemma Sen in significant roles, whilst Menon introduced Harris Jayaraj as music composer with the film. The film was advertised as a Valentine's Day release in 2001 and told the tale of a young man who falls in love with the girl engaged to his ex-college rival. Upon release it went on to become a large success commercially and won positive reviews from critics, with claims that the film had a lot of "lot of verve and vigour" and that it was "technically excellent".

The success of the film led producer Vashu Bhagnani to sign him on to direct the Hindi language remake of the film, Rehnaa Hai Terre Dil Mein (2001), starring Madhavan alongside Dia Mirza and Saif Ali Khan. Menon was initially apprehensive but said it eventually took "half an hour" to agree, but against his intentions, the producer opted against retaining the technical crew of the original. He changed a few elements, deleted certain scenes and added some more for the version. A critic felt that "the presentation is not absorbing" though stating that Menon "handled certain sequences with aplomb"; the film subsequently became a below-average box office performer. The failure of the film left him disappointed, with Menon claiming in hindsight that the film lacked the simplicity of the original with the producer's intervention affecting proceedings. Several years after release, the film later gained popularity through screenings on television and subsequently developed a cult following amongst young Hindi-speaking audiences. In 2011, the producer of the film approached him to remake Rehnaa Hai Terre Dil Mein with the producer's son Jackky Bhagnani in the lead role, but Menon was uninterested with the offer. Later on in 2001, it was reported that he was working on a film tentatively titled Iru Vizhi Unadhu, though the project did not develop into production.

=== Police duology (2003–2006) ===
Gautham Menon returned in 2003 by directing the realistic police thriller Kaakha Kaakha (2003) starring Suriya, Jyothika and Jeevan. The film portrayed the personal life of a police officer and how his life is affected by gangsters, showing a different perspective of police in comparison to other Tamil films of the time. Menon revealed that he was inspired to make the film after reading articles on how to encounter specialists who shoot gangsters and how their families get threatening calls in return, and initially approached Madhavan, Ajith Kumar and then Vikram for the role without success, with all three actors citing that they did not want to play a police officer. The lead actress Jyothika asked Menon to consider Suriya for the role, and he was subsequently selected after Menon saw his portrayal in Nandha. He held a rehearsal of the script with the actors, a costume trial with Jyothika and then enrolled Suriya in a commando training school before beginning production, which he described as a "very planned shoot". The film consequently opened to very positive reviews from critics on the way to becoming another success for Menon, with critics labeling it as a "career high film". Furthermore, the film was described as "for action lovers who believe in logical storylines and deft treatment" with Menon being praised for his linear narrative screenplay.

Menon subsequently remade the film in the Telugu language as Gharshana (2004) starring Venkatesh in Suriya's role. The film also featured actress Asin and Salim Baig in prominent roles and went on to earn commercial and critical acclaim with reviewers citing that "film redeems itself due to the technical excellence and masterful craft of Gautham", drawing comparisons of Menon with noted film makers Mani Ratnam and Ram Gopal Varma. In July 2004, Menon also agreed terms to direct and produce another version of Kaakha Kaakha in Hindi with Sunny Deol in the lead role and revealed that the script was written five years ago with Deol in mind, but the film eventually failed to take off. Producer Vipul Shah approached him to direct the Hindi version of the film in 2010 as Force with John Abraham and Genelia D'Souza, and Menon initially agreed before pulling out again. Menon and the original producer, Dhanu, also floated an idea of an English-language version with a Chechnyan backdrop, though talks with a potential collaboration with Ashok Amritraj collapsed. In 2018, Menon revealed that he had plans of making a sequel to Kaakha Kaakha with Suriya. His next project, Pachaikili Muthucharam (2007), based on the novel Derailed by James Siegel, featured Sarath Kumar and Jyothika and was released in February 2007. Initially, the lead role was offered to Kamal Haasan who passed the opportunity, while actors Cheran and Madhavan declined citing date and image problems respectively. Menon met Sarath Kumar at an event where he cited he was looking to change his 'action' image and Menon subsequently cast him in the lead role. During production, the film ran into further casting trouble with Simran dropping out her assigned role and was replaced by Shobana after another actress, Tabu, also rejected the role. Shobana was also duly replaced by a newcomer, Andrea Jeremiah to portray the character of Kalyani in the film. The film was under production for over a year and coincided with the making of his previous film which was largely delayed. The film initially opened to positive reviews with a critic citing that Menon is "growing with each passing film. His style is distinctive, his vision clear, his team rallies around him and he manages to pull it off each time he attempts". However the film became a financial failure for the producer, V. Ravichandran and in regard to the failure of the film, Menon went on to claim that Sarath Kumar was "wrong for the film" and that he tweaked the story to fit his image; he also claimed that his father's ailing health and consequent death a week before the release had left him mentally affected. In mid-2007, Menon announced and began work on a youth-centric film titled Chennaiyil Oru Mazhaikaalam featuring Trisha and an ensemble of newcomers. Set in the backdrop of Chennai's booming IT industry, the team began its shoot in September 2007 and continued for thirty days but was later delayed and eventually shelved. In 2011, he revealed that the film was dropped because he felt the actors "needed to be trained", and would consider restarting the project at a later stage.

His next release, Vaaranam Aayiram (2008), saw him re-collaborate with Suriya, who played dual roles in the film. The film illustrates the theme of how a father often came across in his son's life as a hero and inspiration, and Menon dedicated the film to his late father who died in 2007. The pre-production of the film, then titled Chennaiyil Oru Mazhaikaalam began in 2003, with Menon planning it as a romantic film with Suriya as a follow-up to their successful previous collaboration, Kaakha Kaakha. Abhirami was signed and then dropped due to her height before a relatively new actress at the time Asin was selected to make her debut in Tamil films with the project. The first schedule of the film began in January 2004 in Visakhapatanam and consequently romantic scenes with Suriya and Asin were shot for ten days and then a photo shoot with the pair. The film was subsequently stalled and was eventually relaunched with a new cast including Divya Spandana, Simran and Sameera Reddy in 2006 with Aascar Ravichandran stepping in as producer, who opted for a change of title. Menon has described the film as "autobiographical and a very personal story and if people didn't know, that 70% of this [the film] is from my life". Throughout the film-making process, Menon improvised the script to pay homage to his late father by adding a family angle to the initial romantic script, with Suriya eventually playing dual roles. The film's production process became noted for the strain and the hard work that Suriya had gone through to portray the different roles with production taking nearly two years. The film was released to a positive response, with critics heaping praise on Suriya's performance while claiming that the film was "just a feather in Gautam's hat" and that it was "a classic". The film was made at a budget of 150 million rupees and became a commercial success, bringing in almost 220 million rupees worldwide. It went on to become Menon's most appreciated work till date winning five Filmfare Awards, nine Vijay Awards and the National Film Award for Best Feature Film in Tamil for 2008 amongst other accolades. Post-release of the film, Menon had a public fallout with his regular music composer Harris Jayaraj and announced that they would no longer work together, though they later returned in 2015 for Yennai Arindhaal. In late 2008, during the making of Vaaranam Aayiram, he had signed on with Sivaji Productions to direct Ajith Kumar and Sameera Reddy in an action film titled Surangani. Menon later pulled out of the commitment citing that the producers were not willing to let him take his own time with scripting.

=== Success (2007–08) ===
His next project, Pachaikili Muthucharam (2007), based on the novel Derailed by James Siegel, featured Sarath Kumar and Jyothika and was released in February 2007. Initially, the lead role was offered to Kamal Haasan who passed the opportunity, while actors Cheran and Madhavan declined citing date and image problems respectively. Menon met Sarath Kumar at an event where he cited he was looking to change his 'action' image and Menon subsequently cast him in the lead role. During production, the film ran into further casting trouble with Simran dropping out her assigned role and was replaced by Shobana after another actress, Tabu, also rejected the role. Shobana was also duly replaced by a newcomer, Andrea Jeremiah to portray the character of Kalyani in the film. The film was under production for over a year and coincided with the making of his previous film which was largely delayed. The film initially opened to positive reviews with a critic citing that Menon is "growing with each passing film. His style is distinctive, his vision clear, his team rallies around him and he manages to pull it off each time he attempts". However the film became a financial failure for the producer, V. Ravichandran and in regard to the failure of the film, Menon went on to claim that Sarath Kumar was "wrong for the film" and that he tweaked the story to fit his image; he also claimed that his father's ailing health and consequent death a week before the release had left him mentally affected. In mid-2007, Menon announced and began work on a youth-centric film titled Chennaiyil Oru Mazhaikaalam featuring Trisha and an ensemble of newcomers. Set in the backdrop of Chennai's booming IT industry, the team began its shoot in September 2007 and continued for thirty days but was later delayed and eventually shelved. In 2011, he revealed that the film was dropped because he felt the actors "needed to be trained", and would consider restarting the project at a later stage.

His next release, Vaaranam Aayiram (2008), saw him re-collaborate with Suriya, who played dual roles in the film. The film illustrates the theme of how a father often came across in his son's life as a hero and inspiration, and Menon dedicated the film to his late father who died in 2007. The pre-production of the film, then titled Chennaiyil Oru Mazhaikaalam began in 2003, with Menon planning it as a romantic film with Suriya as a follow-up to their successful previous collaboration, Kaakha Kaakha. Abhirami was signed and then dropped due to her height before a relatively new actress at the time Asin was selected to make her debut in Tamil films with the project. The first schedule of the film began in January 2004 in Visakhapatanam and consequently romantic scenes with Suriya and Asin were shot for ten days and then a photo shoot with the pair. The film was subsequently stalled and was eventually relaunched with a new cast including Divya Spandana, Simran and Sameera Reddy in 2006 with Aascar Ravichandran stepping in as producer, who opted for a change of title. Menon has described the film as "autobiographical and a very personal story and if people didn't know, that 70% of this [the film] is from my life". Throughout the film-making process, Menon improvised the script to pay homage to his late father by adding a family angle to the initial romantic script, with Suriya eventually playing dual roles. The film's production process became noted for the strain and the hard work that Suriya had gone through to portray the different roles with production taking nearly two years. The film was released to a positive response, with critics heaping praise on Suriya's performance while claiming that the film was "just a feather in Gautam's hat" and that it was "a classic". The film was made at a budget of 150 million rupees and became a commercial success, bringing in almost 220 million rupees worldwide. It went on to become Menon's most appreciated work till date winning five Filmfare Awards, nine Vijay Awards and the National Film Award for Best Feature Film in Tamil for 2008 amongst other accolades. Post-release of the film, Menon had a public fallout with his regular music composer Harris Jayaraj and announced that they would no longer work together, though they later returned in 2015 for Yennai Arindhaal. In late 2008, during the making of Vaaranam Aayiram, he had signed on with Sivaji Productions to direct Ajith Kumar and Sameera Reddy in an action film titled Surangani. Menon later pulled out of the commitment citing that the producers were not willing to let him take his own time with scripting.

=== Romance and experimentation (2010–2014) ===
In 2010, Menon made a return to romantic genre after 2 years with the Tamil romantic film Vinnaithaandi Varuvaayaa (2010), starring Silambarasan and Trisha. Originally planned as a Jessie with Mahesh Babu in the lead role, the actor's refusal prompted Menon to make the Tamil version first. The film explored the complicated relationship between a Hindu Tamil assistant director, Karthik, and a Christian Malayali girl, Jessie and their resultant emotional conflicts. The film featured music by A. R. Rahman in his first collaboration with Menon whilst cinematographer Manoj Paramahamsa was also selected to be a part of the technical crew. Menon cited that he was "a week away from starting the film with a newcomer" before his producer insisted they looked at Silambarasan, with Menon revealing that he was unimpressed with the actor's previous work. The film was in production for close to a year and throughout the opening week of filming, promotional posters from classic Indian romantic films were released featuring the lead pair. Prior to release, the film became the first Tamil project to have a music soundtrack premiere outside of India, with a successful launch at the BAFTA in London. Upon release, the film achieved positive reviews, with several critics giving the film "classic" status, whilst also become a commercially successful venture. Reviewers praised Menon citing that "credit for their perfect portrayal, of course, goes to Gautam Vasudev Menon. This is one director who's got the pulse of today's urban youth perfectly" and that "crafted a movie that will stay in our hearts for a long, long time." Soon after the Tamil version began shoot, Menon decided to begin a Telugu version titled Ye Maaya Chesave (2010) and release it simultaneously, with featuring a fresh cast of Naga Chaitanya and debutante Samantha. Like the Tamil version, the film won critical acclaim and was given "classic" status from critics, as it went on to become among the most profitable Telugu films of 2010. In 2016, he revealed that he had scripted a spin-off film from Vinnaithaandi Varuvaayaa titled Ondraga, where the character of Karthik's life would be followed eight years after the happenings of the previous film.

He next began research and pre-production work on a 1920s period spy thriller titled Thuppariyum Anand in early 2010, with both Ajith Kumar and then Suriya considered for the lead roles, but the film failed to progress. Menon had also made progress over the previous two years directing the psychological thriller Nadunisi Naaygal (2011) featuring his assistant and debutant Veera Bahu and Sameera Reddy. Menon claimed that the film was inspired by a true event from the US, while also claiming that a novel also helped form the story of the film. During the making, he explicitly revealed that the film was for "the multiplex audience" and would face a limited release, citing that "it will not cater to all sections of the audience". He promoted the film by presenting a chat show dubbed as Koffee with Gautham where he interviewed Bharathiraja and Silambarasan, both of whom had previously worked in such psychological thriller films with Sigappu Rojakkal and Manmadhan. The film, which was his first home production under Photon Kathaas and did not have a background score, told the story of a victim of child abuse and the havoc he causes to women, narrating the events of a particular day. The film opened to mixed reviews with one critic citing it as "above average" but warning that "don't go expecting a typical Gautham romantic film" and that it "is definitely not for the family audiences", while criticizing that "there are too many loopholes in the story, raising doubts about logic". In contrast another critic dubbed it as an "unimpressive show by director Menon, as it is neither convincing nor appealing, despite having some engrossing moments". A group of protesters held a protest outside Gautham's house on reason for misusing a goddess's name in his film and also showing explicit sex and violent scenes, claiming that it was against Tamil culture. Soon after the release of the film, Menon began pre-production work on a television series featuring Parthiban in the lead role of a detective, but did not carry through with the idea after he failed to find financiers.

Menon returned to Bollywood with the Hindi remake of Vinnaithaandi Varuvaayaa, titled Ekk Deewana Tha (2012), with Prateik Babbar and Amy Jackson. Unlike the South Indian versions, the film opened to unanimously below average reviews, with critics noting the story "got lost in translation", and became a box office failure. Post-release, Menon admitted that he "got the casting wrong", and subsequently other Hindi films he had pre-planned were dropped. During the period, Menon also began pre-production work on the first film of an action-adventure series of films titled Yohan starring Vijay in the title role. However, after a year of pre-production, the director shelved the film citing differences of opinion about the project.

Menon's next releases were the romantic films Neethaane En Ponvasantham (2012) in Tamil and Yeto Vellipoyindhi Manasu (2012) in Telugu, both co-produced by Photon Kathaas. Jiiva and Nani played the lead roles in each version respectively, while Samantha was common in both films. Ilaiyaraaja was chosen as music composer for the film, which told the story of three stages in the life of a couple. A third Hindi version Assi Nabbe Poorey Sau, was also shot simultaneously with Aditya Roy Kapoor playing the lead role, though the failure of Ek Deewana Tha saw production ultimately halted. The films both opened to average reviews and collections, with critics noting Menon "falls into the trap every seasoned filmmaker dreads -- of repeating his own mandatory formula" though noting that the film has its "sparkling moments". The response of the film prompted a legal tussle to ensue between Menon and the film's producer Elred Kumar, prompting the director to release an emotionally charged letter attempting to clear his name of any financial wrongdoing. Menon was then briefly associated with the anthology film, X, helping partially direct a script written by Thiagarajan Kumararaja before opting out and being replaced by Nalan Kumarasamy. He also began production work on a big-budgeted venture titled Dhruva Natchathiram, signing up an ensemble cast including Suriya, Trisha, Priya Anand, and Arun Vijay, with a series of posters issued and an official launch event being held. However, in October 2013, Suriya left the film citing Menon's lack of progress in developing the script and the film was subsequently dropped. Later in early 2015, Menon restarted pre-production for the project with Vikram and Nayantara, but again was forced to postpone the film citing financial restraints.

Following Suriya's withdrawal from Dhruva Natchathiram, Menon moved on to begin a romantic thriller film with Silambarasan and Pallavi Subhash in the lead role from November 2013. The film developed under the title Sattendru Maarathu Vaanilai and was shot for thirty days, before the film was put on hold as a result of Menon getting an offer from producer A. M. Rathnam to begin a film starring Ajith Kumar.

=== Return to action genre (2015–present) ===
He began filming for Yennai Arindhaal (2015), the third instalment in his franchise of police films. He described Ajith's character Sathyadev as an "extension" of the protagonists from Kaakha Kaakha and Vettaiyaadu Vilaiyaadu, while Trisha, Anushka Shetty, Arun Vijay and Parvathy Nair were also selected to portray supporting roles. The film saw him collaborate again with music composer Harris Jayaraj, for the first time since their spat in 2008, while writers Shridhar Raghavan and Thiagarajan Kumararaja were both also involved in the screen-writing process. Focussing on the story of a police officer's professional and personal life from the ages of thirteen to thirty-eight with the backdrop of tackling an organ-trafficking gang, Yennai Arindhaal opened to mixed to positive reviews in February 2015. Critics from The Hindu wrote it "leaves you feeling like having gone back to a well-known play you have enjoyed a few times over", and that it is "a much-needed intervention in the Tamil commercial cinema space" while also "the most engaging of the three [police films]". Reviewer Udhav Naig of The Hindu added that "Gautham wins as he has reconfigured, albeit not radically, the basic contours of a Tamil cop", and that he "has consistently improved on the character sketch in the last three films." The film also performed well at the box office and gave Menon his first commercially successful Tamil film in five years. Soon after the release, he began work on a sequel to the film and expressed his interest in approaching Ajith again to work together in the future. Menon also worked as a singer in Radha Mohan's film Uppu Karuvaadu (2015).

After Yennai Arindhaal, Menon resumed work on his film with Silambarasan under the new title of Achcham Yenbadhu Madamaiyada (2016), with Manjima Mohan joining the cast to replace Pallavi Sharda. A Telugu version with Naga Chaitanya and Manjima was simultaneously shot under the title Sahasam Swasaga Sagipo, with Menon revealing that he hoped to finance the Tamil version through the salary he received from the Telugu film's producers. Menon also has Enai Noki Paayum Thota (2019), featuring Dhanush and Megha Akash.

He has also completed a web series titled Queen (2019) based on the life of political leader Jayalalithaa, which features Ramya Krishnan in the lead role. The series is released on MX Player. He later directed television series Paava Kadhaigal (2020) and Navarasa (2021).

He has directed Vendhu Thanindhathu Kaadu (2022) and Joshua: Imai Pol Kaakha (2024) for Vels Film International.

In 2025, Gautham Menon, in his first Malayalam outing Dominic and the Ladies' Purse, collaborated with Mammootty, delivering a detective movie that got mixed reviews from critics.

== Filmmaking style ==
Menon has stated that he is largely inspired by the "depth and aesthetics" that are created by American films. He usually makes the characters in his films sport identical haircuts and urban casual wear and by speaking in English. His films are also known for their strong depiction of female characters, in contrast to other contemporary Tamil films which, according to journalist Sudhish Kamath, are "hero-worshipping star vehicles where the heroine is just a mere prop". Kamath also notes that several defining traits of Menon's films include liberal doses of English and restraint, the villains being "a seriously dangerous threat", his male protagonists being a "picture of grace and dignity" who are yet fallible, who love their fathers and are trying hard to be good men, who respect women and accept them for who they are. The majority of Menon's police films feature a woman, typically the male lead's wife or lover, being fridged. Menon stated that distributors and financiers often lay several limitations and constraints on his films, that such actions only drift his thoughts and make him feel like he is losing creative control. Though his films are perceived as targeting mainly urban audiences, Menon feels they can be enjoyed by anyone.

According to The Hindu's Udhav Naig, Menon's films are "regulated by a matrix of strong middle-class values", and also have biographical elements which, according to Menon, are inspired by his own life. Menon prefers to write the climax of his films only after filming has significantly progressed, stating that though he has an idea about the climax, it always changes when the film starts shooting. He also names his films after classic Tamil phrases and lines from Tamil film songs such as Achcham Yenbadhu Madamaiyada being named after the namesake song from Mannathi Mannan (1960) and Yennai Arindhaal being named after the song "Unnai Arindhaal" from Vettaikkaran (1964). Menon dislikes watching dubbed versions of his own films, and claims his scripts have "a universal theme", citing this as the reason he chose to film Vinnaithaandi Varuvaaya in Telugu as Ye Maaya Chesave, rather than dub. Menon also makes cameo appearances in the films he directs. Menon's films notably feature voiceovers, either from the view of the protagonist or the antagonist.

== Personal life ==
Uthara Menon is his sister and she has worked on his films following Yennai Arindhaal (2015).

== Filmography ==
=== As director and producer ===
- Note: He was credited as Gautham from 2001 to 2008.

List of films directed and produced by Gautham Menon
Year	Title	Director	Producer	Language	Notes
2001	Minnale	Yes	No	Tamil	
2001	Rehnaa Hai Terre Dil Mein	Yes	No	Hindi	Remake of Minnale
2003	Kaakha Kaakha	Yes	No	Tamil	Dubbed for Jeevan
2004	Gharshana	Yes	No	Telugu	Dubbed for Salim Baig
2006	Vettaiyaadu Vilaiyaadu	Yes	No	Tamil	Dubbed for Salim Baig
2007	Pachaikili Muthucharam	Yes	No	Tamil	Dubbed for Milind Soman
2008	Vaaranam Aayiram	Yes	No	Tamil	
2010	Vinnaithaandi Varuvaayaa	Yes	No	Tamil	
2010	Ye Maaya Chesave	Yes	No	Telugu	
2011	Nadunisi Naaygal	Yes	Yes	Tamil	
2011	Veppam	No	Yes	Tamil	
2012	Ekk Deewana Tha	Yes	Yes	Hindi	
2012	Neethaane En Ponvasantham	Yes	Yes	Tamil	
2012	Yeto Vellipoyindhi Manasu	Yes	Yes	Telugu	
2013	Thanga Meenkal	No	Yes	Tamil	
2015	Yennai Arindhaal	Yes	No	Tamil	
2015	Courier Boy Kalyan	No	Yes	Telugu	Simultaneously shot in Telugu and Tamil; Tamil version delayed release
2016	Tamilselvanum Thaniyar Anjalum	No	Yes	Tamil	Simultaneously shot in Telugu and Tamil; Tamil version delayed release
2016	Achcham Yenbadhu Madamaiyada	Yes	Yes	Tamil	
2016	Sahasam Swasaga Sagipo	Yes	Yes	Telugu	
2019	Enai Noki Paayum Thota	Yes	Yes	Tamil	
2020	Putham Pudhu Kaalai	Yes	No	Tamil	Anthology film; segment: Avarum Naanum – Avalum Naanum
2021	Kutty Story	Yes	No	Tamil	Anthology film; segment: Ethirpara Mutham
2022	Vendhu Thanindhathu Kaadu	Yes	No	Tamil	
2024	Joshua Imai Pol Kaakha	Yes	No	Tamil	
2025	Dominic and the Ladies' Purse	Yes	No	Malayalam	
TBA	Dhruva Natchathiram	Yes	Yes	Tamil	Unreleased film

=== As an actor ===
List of films acted by Gautham Menon
Year	Title	Role	Language	Notes	Ref.
1997	Minsara Kanavu	Man in crowd	Tamil	Uncredited role	
2001	Minnale	Flower man	Tamil		
2001	Rehnaa Hai Terre Dil Mein	Maddy's boss	Hindi		
2003	Kaakha Kaakha	Police officer Vasudevan Nair	Tamil		
2006	Vettaiyaadu Vilaiyaadu	Dancer in the song "Manjal Veyil"	Tamil		
2007	Pachaikili Muthucharam	Bus passenger	Tamil		
2008	Vaaranam Aayiram	Informer	Tamil		
2010	Vinnaithaandi Varuvaayaa	Himself	Tamil		
2010	Ye Maaya Chesave	Actor	Telugu		
2012	Ekk Deewana Tha	Actor	Hindi		
2013	Kanna Laddu Thinna Aasaiya	Himself	Tamil		
2015	Yennai Arindhaal	Police officer	Tamil		
2015	Yatchan	Himself	Tamil		
2015	Oru Naal Iravil	Himself	Tamil		
2016	Achcham Yenbadhu Madamaiyada	Police officer	Tamil		
2016	Sahasam Swasaga Sagipo	Police officer	Telugu		
2017	Power Paandi	Himself	Tamil		
2018	Naam	Himself	Malayalam		
2018	Goli Soda 2	Raghavan	Tamil		
2018	Ee Nagaraniki Emaindhi	Himself	Telugu	Cameo appearance	
2020	Oh My Kadavule	Himself	Tamil		
2020	Trance	Solomon	Malayalam		
2020	Kannum Kannum Kollaiyadithaal	DCP Prathap Chakravarthi	Tamil		
2020	Theeviram	DCP Vikraman	Tamil	Special appearance; also narrator	
2021	Kutty Story	Aadhi	Tamil	Anthology film; segment: Ethirpara Mutham	
2021	Rudra Thandavam	Vathapirajan	Tamil		
2021	3:33	Paranormal investigator	Tamil		
2022	FIR	Ajay Dewan	Tamil		
2022	Selfie	Ravi Varma	Tamil		
2022	Don	Himself	Tamil	Cameo appearance	
2022	Sita Ramam	Major Selvan	Telugu		
2023	Michael	Gurunath and Jai (dual role)	Telugu	Partially reshot in Tamil	
2023	Lovefully Yours Veda	Sri Kumar Kartha	Malayalam		
2023	Pathu Thala	Naanjilaar Gunasekaran	Tamil		
2023	Viduthalai Part 1	Sunil Menon	Tamil		
2023	Anuragam	Shankar	Malayalam		
2023	Ustaad	Joseph D’Souza	Telugu		
2023	Karumegangal Kalaigindrana	Komagan	Tamil		
2023	Leo	Joshy Andrews	Tamil		
2023	Sesham Mike-il Fathima	Shiva Narayanan	Malayalam	Cameo appearance	
2024	Rathnam	Anbazhagan	Tamil		
2024	Hit List	Dean Dr. Karunakaran	Tamil		
2024	Hitler	Deputy Commissioner Shakthi	Tamil		
2024	Viduthalai 2	Sunil Menon	Tamil		
2025	Dominic and the Ladies' Purse	Ibrahim Mooppan	Malayalam	Cameo appearance	
2025	Dragon	Vale Kumar	Tamil		
2025	Bazooka	Benjamin Joshua	Malayalam		
2025	Devil's Double Next Level	Inspector Raghavan	Tamil		
2025	Paradha	Photographer	Telugu	Cameo appearance	
2025	Patang	Himself	Telugu		
2026	Euphoria	ACP Jayadev Nair IPS	Telugu		
2026	Carmeni Selvam	Sampath	Tamil		
2026	Jana Nayagan	Srikanth	Tamil		
2026	Aakasamlo Oka Tara	Dean Viswanath	Telugu		
TBA	Varaaham †	TBA	Malayalam	Post-production	
TBA	Dhruva Natchathiram †	TBA	Tamil	Unreleased film	

=== Other roles ===
This is a list of films that Gautham Vasudev Menon worked for other directors for various roles.

List of other roles by Gautham Menon
Year	Title	Language	Notes	Ref.
2010	Ratha Sarithiram	Tamil	Multilingual film; Narrator for Tamil version	
2011	Veppam	Tamil	Dubbing artist for Muthukumar	
2014	Endrendrum	Tamil	Narrator	
2015	Kaaval	Tamil	Narrator	
2015	Uppu Karuvaadu	Tamil	Playback singer for the song "Pudhu Oru Kadhavu"	
2016	Zero	Tamil	Narrator	
2016	Meendum Oru Kadhal Kadhai	Tamil	Narrator	
2018	Thaanaa Serndha Koottam	Tamil	Dubbing artist for Suresh Menon	
2018	Kolamaavu Kokila	Tamil	Playback singer for the song "Edhuvaraiyo"	
2019	Puppy	Tamil	Playback singer for the song "Uyire Vaa"	
2020	Lock Up	Tamil	Narrator	
2020	Theeviram	Tamil	Narrator	
2021	Kodiyil Oruvan	Tamil	Playback singer for the song "Slum Anthem"	
2021	99 Songs	Tamil	Dialogue writer for the Tamil version	
2023	Takkar	Tamil	Narrated the rap portion in the song "Nira"	
2026	Mr. X	Tamil	Narrator	

=== Television ===
Year	Title	Director	Writer	Acting role	Language	Other
2019	Queen	Yes	No	Sridhar	Tamil	Co-directed with Prasath Murugesan
2020	Paava Kadhaigal	Yes	Yes	Sathya	Tamil	Anthology series; segment: Vaanmagal
2021	Navarasa	Yes	No	Master	Tamil	Anthology series; segment: Guitar Kambi Mele Nindru; actor in segment: Peace
2023	Mathagam	No	No	Thirumaaram IAS	Tamil	Disney+ Hotstar series

=== Music videos ===
Year	Title	Role	Actors	Language	Ref.
2010	Semmozhiyaana Thamizh Mozhiyaam	Music video director	Various actors	Tamil	
2018	Koova Koova	Music video director	Sathish Krishnan, Chinnaponnu	Tamil	
2018	Ulaviravu	Music video director	Tovino Thomas, Divyadarshini	Tamil	
2018	Bodhai Kodhai	Music video director	Atharvaa, Aishwarya Rajesh	Tamil	
2021	Allipoola Vennela	Music video director	Mekha Rajan, Anagha, Angelina	Telugu	
2023	Muththa Pichchai	Composer, director	Santhosh, Urmi	Tamil	

=== Short films ===
Year	Title	Director	Producer	Language	Notes
2018	Maa	No	Yes	Tamil	
2020	Karthik Dial Seytha Yenn	Yes	Yes	Tamil	Also cinematographer

== Awards ==
Awards

- Honour by Government of Tamil Nadu – Kalaimamani (2021)
- Vijay Award for Favourite Director for Vaaranam Aayiram (2008)

National Film Awards

- National Film Award for Best Feature Film in Tamil for Vaaranam Aayiram (2008)
- National Film Award for Best Feature Film in Tamil for Thanga Meenkal (2013)

Filmfare Awards

- Filmfare Award for Best Film – Tamil for Thanga Meenkal (2013)

Nandi Awards

- Nandi Award for Best Screenplay Writer for Ye Maaya Chesave (2010)
- Nandi Special Jury Award for Ye Maaya Chesave (2010)

Other Awards

- Vijay Award for Best Film for Thanga Meenkal (2013)
- Rotary Club of Chennai – Honored for Creative Excellence (2010)

== See also ==
- Gautham Vasudev Menon's unrealized projects
