= Ishari K. Ganesh =

Indian academic

- Ganesh during a speech at Vels University (2017)

Chancellor of Vels University
- Incumbent
- Assumed office 1992

Secretary of the consortium of Colleges affiliated to Tamil Nadu Dr. M.G.R. Medical University
- Incumbent
- Assumed office 2007-2009

Founder and chairman of Vels Film International
- Incumbent
- Assumed office 2016

Personal details
- Born: 7 October 1966 (age 60) Chennai, Tamil Nadu, India
- Spouse: Arthi
- Children: 3
- Parent(s): Isari Velan and Pushpa Velan
- Relatives: Varun (Nephew)
- Occupation: Chancellor/Chairman of Vels University

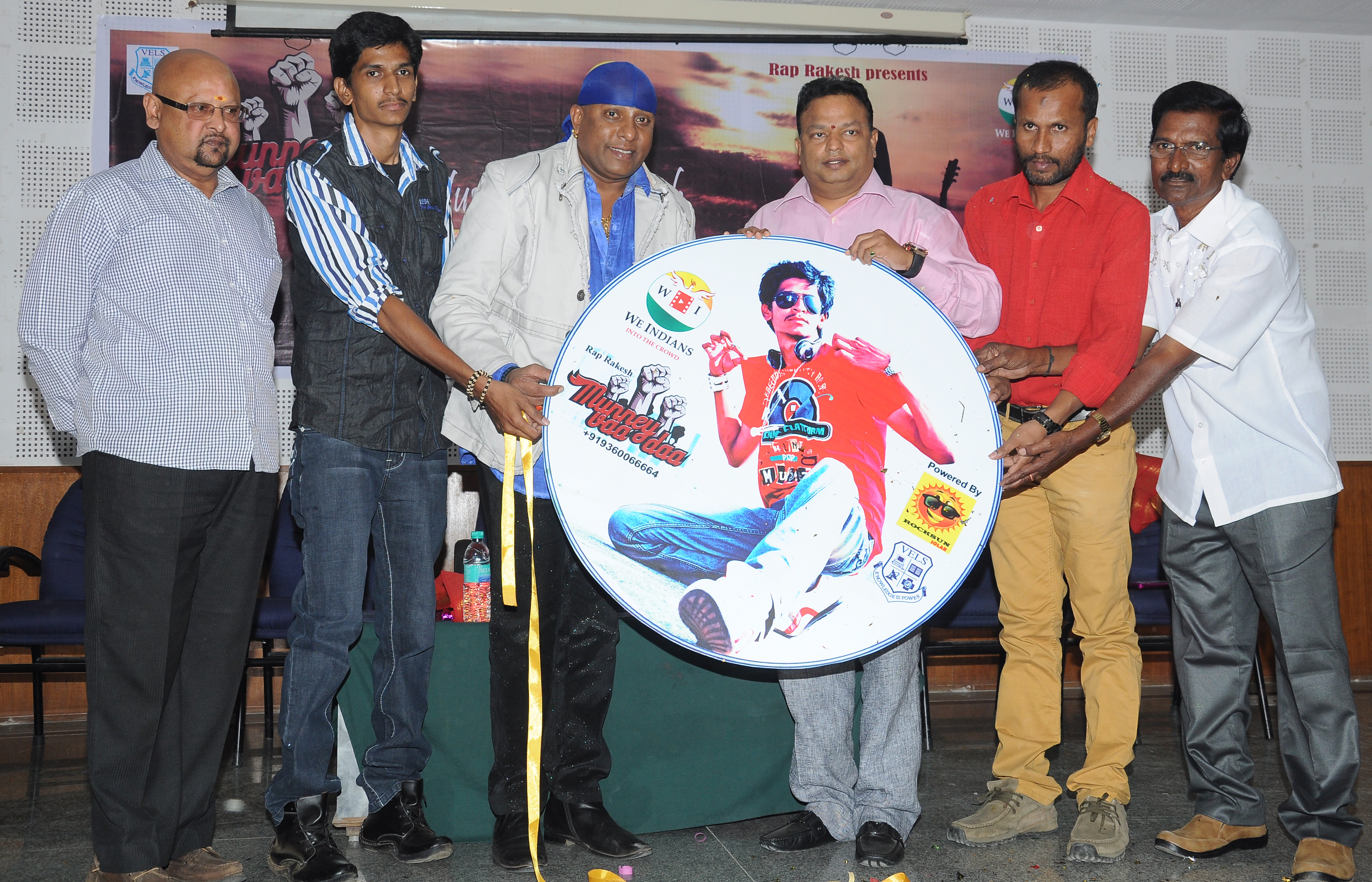
Ganesh (centre right) with Rap Rakesh and Sivamani at Vels University

Ishari K. Ganesh (pronounced as Ai-sari) is the founder, chairman and chancellor of Vels University in Chennai, India. He founded the Vel's Educational Trust in 1992 in memory of his father Isari Velan, a former Member of Legislative Assembly in the state government of M. G. Ramachandran.

He was the President of the Pachaiyappa's Trust board (2011-2014). He was the Secretary of the consortium of Colleges affiliated to Tamil Nadu Dr. M.G.R. Medical University (2007-2009).

Ganesh is also the founder and chairman of Vels Film International, which produces films in Tamil cinema.

== Personal life ==
Ganesh was born to politician Isari Velan and Pushpa Velan.

He's known for his involvement in various educational and social initiatives, including his role as Chancellor of Vels University. In February 2021, Ganesh faced backlash from caste-based organizations for his involvement in speaking out against the official recognition of the Devendrakula Velalar title, which aimed to consolidate several Scheduled Caste communities under a single name which in his opinion the title Vellalar is a reserved title of the sub-castes of that community. The protests highlighted tensions over caste identities and the complexities of addressing caste-based issues in Tamil Nadu.

== Filmography ==
=== As producer ===
Films

Year	Film	Notes
2016	Devi	Tamil version
2017	Bogan	
2018	Sometimes	
2018	Junga	
2019	LKG	
2019	Devi 2	
2019	Comali	
2019	Puppy	
2019	Enai Noki Paayum Thota	
2020	Seeru	
2020	Mookuthi Amman	
2021	Kutty Story	
2022	Vendhu Thanindhathu Kaadu: Part I - The Kindling	
2024	Singapore Saloon	
2024	Joshua Imai Pol Kaakha	
2024	PT Sir	
2025	Aghathiyaa	
2025	Sumo	
2026	Kara	
2026	Gatta Kusthi 2	
2026	Mookuthi Amman 2	
TBA	Dayangaram †	
TBA	Genie †	

Television

Year	Film	Notes
2024	Chutney Sambar	Disney+Hotstar series

=== As actor ===
Year	Title	Role	Notes
1989	Uthama Purushan	Subramani	
1993	Dharma Seelan		
2000	Doubles	Ramki	
2000	Aval Paavam		
2001	Ninaikkaadha Naalillai	Homeless man	
2002	Thulluvadho Ilamai	Police Inspector	
2002	One Two Three	Auto Driver	
2011	Engeyum Kadhal	Kamal's MD	Uncredited appearance in the song "Dhimu Dhimu"
2018	Lakshmi	Award presenter	Uncredited role
2018	2.0	Jayanth Kumar	
