= Enai Noki Paayum Thota =

2019 film directed by Gautham Menon

- Theatrical release poster
- Directed by: Gautham Vasudev Menon
- Written by: Gautham Vasudev Menon
- Produced by: P. Madhan; Gautham Vasudev Menon; Venkat Somasundaram
- Starring: Dhanush; M. Sasikumar; Megha Akash; Sunaina
- Cinematography: Jomon T. John; Manoj Paramahamsa
- Edited by: Praveen Antony
- Music by: Darbuka Siva
- Production companies: Ondraga Entertainment; Escape Artists Motion Pictures
- Distributed by: Vels Film International
- Release date: 29 November 2019
- Running time: 153 minutes
- Country: India
- Language: Tamil

Enai Noki Paayum Thota (transl. The bullet headed towards me) is a 2019 Indian Tamil-language romantic action thriller film directed by Gautham Vasudev Menon, who co-produced the film with P. Madhan and Venkat Somasundaram. The film stars Dhanush, M. Sasikumar, Megha Akash and Sunaina. The music was composed by Darbuka Siva with cinematography handled by Jomon T. John and Manoj Paramahamsa, while Praveen Antony handled the editing.

The film began production in March 2016 but suffered delays due to financial issues, and was completed only in September 2018. It was released on 29 November 2019 to mixed reviews from critics.

== Plot ==
Raghu lives with his family in Pollachi. His older brother Thiru left their house after his girlfriend was killed during a biking trip. Raghu is in his final year of college studying computer science and engineering when he meets an actress, Lekha, who is forced to act against her will. After a few more encounters, they become friends, which eventually blossoms into love. Raghu takes her to his house to introduce Lekha to his parents, and they accept her. However, a film director named Kuberan and a producer arrive at Raghu's house and take Lekha away after threatening Raghu's family. Raghu does not hear from Lekha again and is heartbroken, thinking that she has dumped him.

Four years later, Raghu receives a call from Lekha, who tells him that she is with Thiru, who is in trouble, and further asks him to arrive at Mumbai to help him. Raghu arrives at Mumbai and learns that Thiru is actually an undercover police officer who is seeking to expose an illegal arms deal and is now on the run as the police are after him. Thiru is arrested and taken to court, where the police and goons attack him. Thiru and Raghu, who arrives there on the behest of Thiru's senior Arun Bhide, subdue the attackers, and Thiru escapes without seeing Raghu. Raghu finds the location where Lekha had asked him to arrive and finds her held at knifepoint. He rescues Lekha by defeating the goons. He then gets into an auto, where Thiru appears, and the brothers reconcile. However, the auto is attacked, and Thiru is killed in the shootout, leaving Raghu devastated.

Before the auto was attacked, Thiru had given Raghu a keychain and asked him to keep it safe. Lekha then narrates what happened after Kuberan took her from Raghu's house. Kuberan wanted Lekha to act in more films against her interest, and to make her accept, he thrashed his son and wife, where she finally agreed to act out of fear for Raghu and his family. Kuberan takes her to Mumbai, where he pimped her to other actors, but Thiru rescued her. One day, Thiru asked her to accompany him to a gym and a few other places. It was during this time that Lekha had contacted Raghu. Raghu takes Lekha to his college senior, Mythili's, room to keep her safe.

Kuberan learns about Lekha's location and arrives with DCP Nagaraj to take Lekha away. However, Raghu thrashes Kuberan, stabs Nagaraj (who was the person behind Thiru's death), escapes again with Mythili and Lekha, and tries to clear his brother's name. Raghu visits the gym that Thiru had visited, but finds the locker empty. The police arrive with DCP Suraj, who actually got Thiru embroiled in this problem, and arrest Raghu. In the meantime, Kuberan arrives after finding Lekha's location and takes Lekha and Mythili. Raghu is taken to a room, which is revealed to be Thiru's safe house, where he attacks the police officers before being shot by Nagaraj. However, one of the police officers shoots Nagaraj, and the room is locked.

Having been saved by the keychain, Raghu discovers a table which has a keyhole that matches the key Thiru had given him (the keychain was actually a key) and finds a hard disk and a laptop, which reveals about the illegal arms dealings done by many influential people, including Kuberan. Raghu calls Kuberan and arranges a meeting to provide the hard disk. The police arrive as well, and Raghu shoots all of them dead. Thiru's name is finally cleared, and those involved in the dealings are arrested. Raghu arrives at his sister's wedding with Lekha and Mythili. After secretly performing Thiru's last rites, Raghu tells his parents that Thiru is doing well and that he is a police officer. In a voice-over, Raghu says he will hunt down the people who are involved in Thiru's death.

== Cast ==
- Dhanush as Raghu
- M. Sasikumar as Thiru
- Megha Akash as Lekha
- Sunaina as Mythili
- Senthil Veerasamy as Kuberan
- Rakendu Mouli as Vasanth, Raghu's best friend
- Vela Ramamoorthy as Santhosh, Raghu's father
- S. Kameshwari as Raghu's mother
- Munna Simon as Anand Bhai (Superstar Anand)
- Sindhuri as Saranya, Raghu's sister
- Sanjana Sarathy as Sanjana, Lekha's friend
- Vinu Kartikeyan S as Kishore
- Ashwin Kkumar as Nagraj Manohar
- Arjun Chidambaram as Police Officer
- Ashwin Kumar Lakshmikanthan as Saranya's groom
- AM Venkat as Pandian
- Dadhi Raj as Arun Bhinde
- Vinod as Lala
- Ajit Koshy as Inspector Ajith
- Meena Vemuri as Kuberan's wife
- Rana Daggubati (guest appearance in "Naan Pizhaippeno")

== Production ==
=== Development ===
Gautham Vasudev Menon first discussed the script of Enai Noki Paayum Thota with actor Suriya during mid-2013, but the actor's rejection meant that they instead chose to finalise Dhruva Natchathiram as their next project together. However, soon after the pair had creative differences and their intended collaboration in 2013 was cancelled.

Enai Noki Paayum Thota was relaunched with Dhanush in the lead role during February 2016, after Menon and Dhanush had discussed the script following their work on a talk show. Intended to be a quick project, the team expected to finish the shoot within two months starting from March 2016. Jomon T. John was signed as the film's cinematographer, while Megha Akash was selected to play the leading female role after Menon was impressed with her work in the then unreleased film, Oru Pakka Kathai. The film was announced as a joint production between Menon and P. Madan of Escape Artists Motion Pictures.

=== Filming ===
Principal photography began at SSN Engineering College in Chennai in mid-March 2016. Dhanush and Megha Akash shot scenes on the first day, and were joined by Rana Daggubati, who would portray a guest role. In April 2016, the team travelled to Turkey to film a song and scenes in regions including Istanbul, Ankara, Izmir and Alanaya. Menon had initially attempted to simultaneously shoot the film's Turkey schedule alongside his commitments for his other long-delayed venture, Achcham Yenbadhu Madamaiyada (2016), but the lead actor of the other film, Silambarasan, opted not to turn up to the shoot. In October 2016, following a brief production break to allow Dhanush and Menon to finish other ventures, the team shot an action scene with Stunt Silva in areas across Chennai such as Alwarpet and Thiruvanmiyur. Sunaina was announced as part of the cast in May 2017, after she had already shot some scenes.

In November 2016, Menon revealed that 85% of the film's shoot was complete and that only one more schedule in Mumbai remained. He added that five songs were shot as montages, because the team had not yet finalised a music composer. The film's first look posters and teaser were released in the same month, and the team announced a February 2017 release, but the date was not met after the film ran into financial troubles. Menon also later revealed that he was yet to write a climax to the film and that the film had started shoot without a complete script.

Following a year-long production delay owing to financial problems and Menon and Dhanush's other commitments, another schedule began in December 2017, with Menon suggesting it would complete the film. A further final ten day schedule was then shot in Mumbai during July 2018 with extra scenes added to include actor Sasikumar, who would play the elder brother of Dhanush's character. Principal photography ended in September.

In regard to the continuous delay of the film, Dhanush stated that he was unaware of the financial reasons behind the delay but that he agreed to film whenever Menon had requested. The South Indian Film Financiers' Association (SIFFA) later announced that their members would not finance any of Gautham's films unless Enai Noki Paayum Thota or his other long-delayed venture Dhruva Natchathiram were released. The film was cleared by the censor board without Dhanush dubbing for his character, and even by March 2019, Dhanush's salary had not been settled.

== Music ==
Enai Noki Paayum Thota

Soundtrack album by Darbuka Siva
- Released: 2018
- Venue: Chennai
- Studios: Seed Studios; 20dB Soundstudios
- Genre: Feature film soundtrack
- Length: 43:22
- Language: Tamil
- Labels: Ondraga Entertainment; Sony Music
- Producer: Darbuka Siva

Darbuka Siva chronology
Nimir (2018)	Enai Noki Paayum Thota (2018)	Rocky (2021)
External audio
- Official Audio Jukebox on YouTube

Singles from Enai Noki Paayum Thota
- 1. "Maruvaarthai" Released: 10 February 2017; 2. "Naan Pizhaippeno" Released: 25 March 2017; 3. "Maruvaarthai – Restrung Version" Released: 17 October 2017; 4. "Visiri" Released: 31 December 2017

The music composer of Enai Noki Paayum Thota was kept secret by the director, and was simply referred to as "Mr. X". The first single, "Maruvaarthai" was released on 10 February 2017 and a second single, "Naan Pizhaippeno" was released on 25 March 2017.

After much speculations of who being the music composer of the film, it was revealed that "Mr. X" is Darbuka Siva through Menon's Twitter post. The restrung version of "Maruvaarthai" was released on 17 October and therefore, all the songs of this film are now credited with Darbuka Siva as the composer. In April 2019, the audio rights were transferred from Ondraga to Sony Music India.

Track listing
No.	Title	Lyrics	Singer(s)	Length
1.	"Maruvaarthai"	Thamarai	Sid Sriram	5:56
2.	"Naan Pizhaippeno"	Thamarai	D. Sathyaprakash	6:01
3.	"Poi Varavaa"	Madhan Karky	Bombay Jayashri	1:10
4.	"Visiri"	Thamarai	Sid Sriram, Shashaa Tirupati	5:11
5.	"Thirudaadhe Thirudaadhe"	Thamarai, Aaryan Dinesh Kanagaratnam	Darbuka Siva, Karthik, Aaryan Dinesh Kanagaratnam, Jonita Gandhi	6:25
6.	"Adadaa Naana"	Thamizhanangu	Nakul Abhyankar	4:15
7.	"Hey Nijame"	Madhan Karky	Bombay Jayashri	4:35
8.	"Maruvaarthai" (Restrung)	Thamarai	Sid Sriram	5:01
9.	"Maruvaarthai" (Unplugged)	Thamarai	Sid Sriram	4:48
Total length:				43:22

== Release ==
In November 2018, Lyca Productions bought the film's rights but soon opted out due to some issues. Enai Noki Paayum Thota was planned to release in May 2019, but began facing uncertainty over its release due to Menon's financial problems and Arka Media Works' stay on films produced/distributed by S. N. Rajarajan. However, in August, Menon announced that the film would be released on 6 September 2019. On 5 September, the film's release was further delayed due to lingering financial issues; it was later pushed to 15 November 2019, and then finally to 29 November after Ishari K. Ganesh of Vels Films International bought the film's rights.

== Critical reception ==
Enai Noki Paayum Thota received mixed reviews from critics. On the review aggregator website Rotten Tomatoes, 20% of 5 critics' reviews are positive, with an average rating of 4/10.

Pradeep Kumar of The Hindu wrote "ENPT is no stroke of genius from Gautham Menon. But the way he makes the film punch way above its weight, is a mark of one". Janani K of India Today gave 2.5 out of 5 stars stating "Director Gautham Menon's Enai Noki Paayum Thota starring Dhanush and Megha Akash has a solid storyline. But the promising action drama is diluted by weak writing. Marks Gautham Menon's big-screen comeback after four years. Backed by brilliant performances, the film is a decent watch minus the crazy coincidences". Sowmya Rajendran of The News Minute gave 2.5 out of 5 stars stating "Gautham Menon's film is stylish but has little substance, his thrillers increasingly feel like he's remaking the same template over and over again".

M Suganth of The Times of India gave 2 out of 5 stars stating "Enai Noki Paayum Thota is more or less a reiteration of Gautham Vasudev Menon's previous film, Achcham Yenbadhu Madamaiyada. A competently shot but less than compelling film". Gautaman Bhaskaran of News18 gave 2 out of 5 stars stating "Cinema has long ceased to be fantasy and make-believe. Gautham Vasudev Menon helms this kind of unbelievable existence, his earlier works too have more or less remained in this groove. Dhanush is not a bad actor, and has learnt to be subdued and subtle, not giving himself to histrionics. But his range is something we have never seen". Writing for Firstpost, Sreedhar Pillai gave 2 out of 5 stars stating "Enai Noki Paayum Thota is way off the target and should have been shorter. The Gautham Menon magic is clearly missing". Sify gave 2.5 out of 5 stars stating "Average romantic action thriller".

== Post-release ==
In a 2025 interview with Galatta Plus, Menon was asked about Enai Noki Paayum Thota but denied directing the film, saying it was made by "somebody else". His comments were perceived by some as a joke, while others believed Dhanush interfered with the direction; the film's Wikipedia page was briefly vandalised to include Dhanush's name as director. In a subsequent interview with The Hollywood Reporter India, Menon called it the only film he regretted directing to that point, and refused to take responsibility for the film. He later said his comments in the earlier interview were simply a "joke" and were misconstrued.
