= List of Tamil films of 2020 =

This is a list of Tamil language films produced in the Tamil cinema in India that were released/scheduled to be released in 2020.

== Box office collection ==
The highest-grossing Tamil films released in 2020, by worldwide box office gross revenue, are as follows:

Highest worldwide gross of 2020
Rank	Film	Production company	Worldwide gross	References
1	Darbar	Lyca Productions	₹250 crore	
2	Pattas	Sathya Jyothi Films	₹44 crore	
3	Psycho	Red Giant Movies	₹25 crore	

== Released films ==
=== January – March ===
Opening		Title	Director	Cast	Studio	Ref
J A N	3	Anantha Veedu	Sugumaran	Sugumaran, Shivayam, Nagarajan	Nila Movie Makers	
J A N	3	Ayya Ullen Ayya	Erode Soundar	Kabilesh, Prarthana Sandeep, Livingston, Manobala	Veera Sri Santhana Karuparayan	
J A N	3	En Sangathu Aala Adichavan Evanada	Naveen Manikandan	Vikkas, Madhumitha, Delhi Ganesh, Chitra	SH Media Dreams	
J A N	3	Kadhal Vizhigal	Sri Sumathy	Jayabalan, Sri Sumathy	Sri Sumathy	
J A N	3	Pachai Vilakku	Maran	Maran, Theesha, Imman Annachi, Manobala	Digithink Mediawork	
J A N	3	Pizhai	Rajavel Krishnaa	Kakka Muttai Ramesh, Appa Nasath, Mime Gopi, Charle	Turning Point Productions	
J A N	3	Thedu	Suci Easwar	Sanjay, Meghana, Sivakasi Murgesan, Kamaraj	Kishore Cine Arts	
J A N	3	Thottu Vidum Thooram	V. P. Nageswaran	Vivek Raj, Monica Chinnakotla, Livingston, Seetha	Usha Cine Creations	
J A N	9	Darbar	AR Murugadoss	Rajinikanth, Nayanthara, Nivetha Thomas, Suniel Shetty	Lyca Productions	
J A N	15	Pattas	R. S. Durai Senthilkumar	Dhanush, Sneha, Mehreen Pirzada, Naveen Chandra	Sathya Jyothi Films	
J A N	24	Psycho	Mysskin	Udhayanidhi Stalin, Aditi Rao Hydari, Nithya Menen	Double Meaning Production	
J A N	24	Rajavukku Check	Sai Rajkumar	Cheran, Srushti Dange, Sarayu Mohan, Nandana Varma	Pallatte Kokkatt Film House	
J A N	24	Taana	Yuvaraj Subramani	Vaibhav, Nandita Swetha, Yogi Babu	Nobel Movies Production	
J A N	31	Dagaalty	Vijay Anand	Santhanam, Rittika Sen, Yogi Babu	Hand Made Films	
J A N	31	Maayanadhi	Ashok Thiagarajan	Abi Saravanan, Venba, Aadukalam Naren	Raji Nila Mukil Films	
J A N	31	Utraan	O. Rajagajini	Roshan Udayakumar, Heroshini Komali, Priyanka Nair	Sat Cinemas	
F E B	1	Naadodigal 2	Samuthirakani	Sasikumar, Anjali, Athulya Ravi	Madras Enterprises	
F E B	7	Adavi	G. Ramesh	Vinoth Kishan, Ammu Abirami, Attapadi Radhakrishnan	Shri Krish Pictures	
F E B	7	Pulikodi Devan	S. P. Raaj Prabhu	V. Krishnaswamy, Amala Maria	Chozha Nadu Talkies	
F E B	7	Sandimuni	Milka S. Selvakumar	Natty, Manisha Yadav, Yogi Babu	Sivam Media Works	
F E B	7	Seeru	Rathina Siva	Jiiva, Riya Suman, Gayathri Krishnaa, Navdeep	Vels Film International	
F E B	7	Vaanam Kottattum	Dhana	Sarathkumar, Radhika, Vikram Prabhu, Aishwarya Rajesh	Madras Talkies	
F E B	14	Day Knight	N. K. Kandi	Aadarsh, Finny Mathew, Vipin Thomas	Futurz International	
F E B	14	Naan Sirithaal	Raana	Hiphop Tamizha, Iswarya Menon	Avni Movies	
F E B	14	Oh My Kadavule	Ashwath Marimuthu	Ashok Selvan, Ritika Singh, Vani Bhojan	Axess Film Factory	
F E B	21	Baaram	Priya Krishnaswamy	Raju, Stella Gobi	Reckless Roses	
F E B	21	God Father	Jegan Rajshekar	Natty, Lal, Ananya	GS Arts	
F E B	21	Kutty Devathai	K. Alexander	Chozhavendhan, Teja Reddy, Vela Ramamoorthy	Jai Shakthi Movies	
F E B	21	Kanni Maadam	Bose Venkat	Sriram Karthick, Saya Devi, Murugadoss, Mime Gopi	MSM Movie Traders	
F E B	21	Mafia: Chapter 1	Karthick Naren	Arun Vijay, Priya Bhavani Shankar, Prasanna	Lyca Productions	
F E B	21	Meendum Oru Mariyathai	Bharathiraja	Bharathiraja, Nakshatra	Manoj Creations	
F E B	28	Draupathi	Mohan G	Richard Rishi, Sheela Rajkumar, Karunas	GM Film Corporation	
F E B	28	Galtha	S. Hari Uthraa	Antony Sagayaraj, Siva Nishanth, Ayraa Jain, Appukutty	Malar Movie Makers	
F E B	28	Irumbu Manithan	Disney	Santhosh Prathap, Archana, Ganja Karuppu	Shankar Movies International	
F E B	28	Kadalil Kattumaramai	Yuvraj Munish	Rakshan, Rithika, Elaya, Latha Sai	SB Shoba Movies	
F E B	28	Kannum Kannum Kollaiyadithaal	Desingh Periyasamy	Dulquer Salmaan, Ritu Varma, Rakshan, Niranjani	Anto Joseph Film Company	
M A R	6	College Kumar	Hari Santhosh	Prabhu, Rahul Vijay, Priya Vadlamani, Madhoo	M. R. Pictures	
M A R	6	Ettuthikkum Para	Keera	Samuthirakani, Chandini Tamilarasan, Nitish Veera	Varnalaya Cine Creations	
M A R	6	Gypsy	Raju Murugan	Jiiva, Natasha Singh, Sunny Wayne	Olympia Movies	
M A R	6	Indha Nilai Maarum	Arunkanth	Ramkumar, Ashwin Kumar Lakshmikanthan, Nivedhithaa Sathish	Panthalam Cinemas	
M A R	6	Velvet Nagaram	Manojkumar Natarajan	Varalaxmi Sarathkumar, Ramesh Thilak	Makers Studios	
M A R	13	Alti	M. J. Hussain	Anbhu Mayilsami, Manishajith, Sendrayan	NSR Film Factory	
M A R	13	Asuraguru	A. Rajdeep	Vikram Prabhu, Mahima Nambiar	JSB Film Studios	
M A R	13	Dharala Prabhu	Krishna Marimuthu	Harish Kalyan, Tanya Hope, Vivek	Screen Scene Media Entertainment	
M A R	13	Kayiru	Ganesh	S. R. Gunaa, Kavya Madhav, Cheranraj	Skyway Pictures	
M A R	13	Thanchamada Nee Yenakku	M. Charle	Dileep Poonthura, Binees Baskar, Tiger Khan	RM Real Media	
M A R	13	Walter	U. Anbarasan	Sibiraj, Shirin Kanchwala, Samuthirakani	11:11 Productions (P) Ltd	

=== April – June ===
Opening		Title	Director	Cast	Studio	Ref
A P R	1	Sethum Aayiram Pon	Anand Ravichandran	Srilekha Rajendran, Nivedhithaa Sathish, Avinash Raghudevan	Wishberry Films	
M A Y	29	Ponmagal Vandhal	J. J. Frederick	Jyothika, Parthiban, K. Bhagyaraj	2D Entertainment, Amazon Prime Video	
M A Y	30	Mamakiki	Shree Karthick; G. Radhakrishnan; Sameer Bharath Ram; Karthik Siva; Vadivel	Preetha Anandan, Ramesh Thilak, Dev	Super Talkies, ZEE5	
J U N	19	Penguin	Eashvar Karthic	Keerthy Suresh, Linga, Madhampatty Rangaraj	Stone Bench Films, Passion Studios, Amazon Prime Video	
J U N	19	Yaadhumagi Nindraai	Gayathri Raguram	Gayathri Raguram, Nivas Adithan, Sindhu Krishnan	Suja Movies, ZEE5	

=== July–September ===
Opening		Title	Director	Cast	Studio	Ref
J U L	10	Cocktail	Vijaya Murugan	Yogi Babu, Rashmi Gopinath, Mithun Maheswaran, KPY Bala	PG Mediaworks, ZEE5	
J U L	31	Hawala	Ammith Rao	Srinivas, Ammith Rao, Amulya, Nizhalgal Ravi	Apples and Pears Filmy Mystics	
A U G	1	Danny	L. C. Santhanamoorthy	Varalaxmi Sarathkumar, Vela Ramamoorthy	PG Mediaworks	
A U G	14	Lock Up	S. G. Charles	Vaibhav, Venkat Prabhu, Vani Bhojan	Shvedh Group	
A U G	15	Onbathu Kuzhi Sampath	J. A. Ragupathi	Balaji Maharaja, Nikhila Vimal, Appukutty	80-20 Pictures	
S E P	6	Madham	Rajni	Vijayshankar, Swathishta Krishnan, John, Dinakaran	Kalikambal Films	

=== October–December ===
Opening		Title	Director	Cast	Studio	Ref
O C T	2	Ka Pae Ranasingam	P. Virumaandi	Vijay Sethupathi, Aishwarya Rajesh, Bhavani Sre	KJR Studios	
O C T	2	Silence	Hemant Madhukar	Madhavan, Anushka Shetty, Michael Madsen, Anjali	People Media Factory, Kona Film Corporation	
O C T	6	Varmaa	Bala	Dhruv Vikram, Megha Chowdhury, Raiza Wilson	E4 Entertainment	
O C T	16	Putham Pudhu Kaalai	Sudha Kongara; Gautham Vasudev Menon; Rajiv Menon; Suhasini Maniratnam; Karthik Subbaraj	Jayaram, Ritu Varma, Shruti Haasan, Andrea Jeremiah, Bobby Simha	Amazon Prime Video	
O C T	27	Patra Vaitha Nerupondru	Vinoth Rajendran	Dinesh Sadasivam, Smruthi Venkat, Ranjith	Iruvar Film Factory	
O C T	30	Nungambakkam	Ramesh Selvan	Ajmal, Mano, Ayra, A. Venkatesh	Dream World Cinemas	
N O V	12	Soorarai Pottru	Sudha Kongara	Suriya, Paresh Rawal, Aparna Balamurali, Urvashi, Mohan Babu	2D Entertainment, Amazon Prime Video	
N O V	14	Biskoth	R. Kannan	Santhanam, Tara Alisha Berry, Sowcar Janaki	Masala Pix	
N O V	14	Irandam Kuththu	Santhosh P. Jayakumar	Santhosh P. Jayakumar, Akrithi Singh	Flying Horse Pictures	
N O V	14	Marijuana	M. D. Anand	Rishi Rithvik, Asha Parthalom	Third Eye Creation	
N O V	14	Mookuthi Amman	RJ Balaji; N. J. Saravanan	Nayanthara, RJ Balaji, Urvashi, Smruthi Venkat	Vels Film International	
N O V	14	Naanga Romba Busy	Badri	Prasanna, Shaam, Ashwin Kakumanu, Shruti Marathe	Avni Movies	
N O V	14	Thatrom Thookrom	Arul Suriakannu	Teejay Arunasalam, Kaali Venkat, Cheenu Mohan	Media Marshal	
N O V	20	Puranagar	Minnal Murugan	Kamal Govindraj, Ashwini Chandrasekar, Suganya	Valliyammaal Production	
N O V	20	Quota	P. Amudhavanan	Chella, Saji Subarna, Naresh Madeswar	Team A Ventures	
N O V	20	Routtu	A. C. Manikandan	Kavithiran, Madhumitha, Appukutty, Mime Gopi	Saromi Movie Garland	
N O V	24	Andhaghaaram	V. Vignarajan	Arjun Das, Vinoth Kishan, Pooja Ramachandran, Misha Ghoshal	A for Apple	
N O V	26	13aam Number Veedu	Vivy Kathiresan	Ramana, Sanjeev, Praveen Prem, Varsha Bollamma	Sri Swarnalatha Productions	
N O V	26	Theeviram	Michael Muthu	Gokul Anand, Amzath Khan, Arjun Chidambaram	Super Talkies	
N O V	27	Aarvakolaru	G. V. Chandar	Abilash, Preethi Dyana, Martin Jayaraj	Big Screen Cinemas	
N O V	27	Dhowalath	Sanjhey Siva	Sakthi Sivan, Ritu, Yogi Babu, Yog Japee	Right Arts	
N O V	27	Kavalthurai Ungal Nanban	RDM	Suresh Ravi, Raveena Ravi, Mime Gopi	BR Talkies Corporation	
N O V	27	Yen Peyar Anandhan	Sridhar Venkatesan	Santhosh Prathap, Athulya Ravi, Deepak Paramesh	Savitha Cine Arts	
D E C	4	Ithu En Kathal Puthakam	Madhu G. Kamalam	Jai Jacob, Rajesh Raj, Anjitha Sree	Roseland Cinemas	
D E C	4	Kadathal Kaaran	S. Kumar	Kevin, Renu Soundar, Rukmini Babu	F3 Films	
D E C	4	Kanni Raasi	Muthukumaran	Vimal, Varalaxmi Sarathkumar, Pandiarajan	King Movie Makers	
D E C	4	Soodu	S. Arumugasamy	M. Pandian, Sasana, Thendral	SKM Medias	
D E C	11	Biya	Raaj Gokul Dass	Jubilrajan P. Dev, Savanthika	Aromal Cine Creation	
D E C	11	Karuppankaatu Valasu	Selvendran	Ebenezer Devaraj, Neelima Esai, George Vijay Nelson	Crew21 Entertainment	
D E C	11	Kombu	E. Ibrahim	Lollu Sabha Jeeva, Disha Pandey, Pandiarajan	Sri Sai Srivivasa Pictures	
D E C	11	Mei Maranthen	V. Muthukumar	Sanjay, Sanyathara, Nekha	CGM Pictures	
D E C	11	Miya	A. L. Ravi; Mathew S.	Namitha, Sonia Agarwal, Veerender	E Media Productions	
D E C	11	Thiruvalar Panchangam	Malarvizhi Natesan	Ananth Nag, Kadhal Sukumar, Aadukalam Naren	Alar Studios	
D E C	18	Kallathanam	E. C. Dhandapani	Yugan, Sapna, Martin, Kannan	Win Pictures	
D E C	18	Selathu Ponnu	Star Ganesh	Star Ganesh, Kamali	Star Ganesh	
D E C	18	Sollunganne Sollunga	Elango Lakshman	Mahanadi Shankar, Nellai Siva, Halwa Vasu	Arun Creations	
D E C	18	Vaazhthugiren	Ramasubramanian	Kutty Raja, Jeni	MM Cinemas	
D E C	25	Chithirame Solladi	Gourishankar	Cool Suresh, Gopika Nair, Mahanadi Shankar	MGS Productions	
D E C	25	Chiyangal	Vaigarai Balan	Karikalan, Risha, Nalinikanth	KL Productions	
D E C	25	Enakku Onnu Therinjaakanum	K. S. Saravanan	Kiran, Meghana, Viji Chandrasekhar	Enjoy Creators	
D E C	25	Manthira Palagai	R. Sampath	R. Sampath, Gayathri	Sivasankari Movie Makers	
D E C	25	Ooratchi Ondriyam	K. M. Krishnamurthy	Sridhar, Thamali, R. Sundarrajan	Pandimuni Pictures	
D E C	25	Oru Pakka Kathai	Balaji Tharaneetharan	Kalidas Jayaram, Megha Akash, Jeeva Ravi	Vasans Visual Ventures	
D E C	25	Thappa Yosikadheenga	Sulthaans	S. P. Raja, Jyothisha	Niranjana Productions	
D E C	25	Thoonga Kangal	T. Vinu	T. Vinu, Durai Sudhakar, George Maryan	Vetri Films	
D E C	25	Time Up	Manu Parthepan	Rajendran, Manu Parthepan, Monica Chinnakotla	Kalai Cinemas	
D E C	25	Uyirkkodi	R. P. Ravi	R. P. Ravi, Anjana Naksathra	Jayakkodi Pictures	
D E C	25	Vaanga Padam Paarkalam	K. S. Nesamanavan	GG, Kamali, Livingston	SSP Arts Movies	

== Awards ==
Category/organization	Filmfare Awards South 9 October 2022	SIIMA Awards 19 September 2021	Ananda Vikatan Cinema Awards 30 March 2023
Best Film	Jai Bhim (2021)	Soorarai Pottru	Jai Bhim (2021)
Best Director	Sudha Kongara; Soorarai Pottru	Sudha Kongara; Soorarai Pottru	T. J. Gnanavel; Jai Bhim (2021)
Best Actor	Suriya; Soorarai Pottru	Suriya; Soorarai Pottru	Suriya; Soorarai Pottru / Jai Bhim (2021)
Best Actress	Lijomol Jose; Jai Bhim (2021)	Aishwarya Rajesh; Ka Pae Ranasingam	Lijomol Jose; Jai Bhim (2021)
Best Music Director	G. V. Prakash Kumar; Soorarai Pottru	G. V. Prakash Kumar; Soorarai Pottru	Anirudh Ravichander; Doctor (2021) / Master (2021)
