= Tharunam =

2025 Tamil film by Arvindh Srinivasan

- Theatrical release poster
- Directed by: Arvindh Srinivasan
- Written by: Arvindh Srinivasan
- Produced by: Pugazh; Eden
- Starring: Kishen Das; Smruthi Venkat
- Cinematography: Raja Bhattacharjee
- Music by: Songs: Darbuka Siva; Score: Ashwin Hemanth
- Production company: Zhen Studios
- Release date: 31 January 2025
- Running time: 137 minutes
- Country: India
- Language: Tamil

Tharunam (transl. Moment) is a 2025 Indian Tamil-language romantic action thriller film written and directed by Arvindh Srinivasan and produced by Pugazh and Eden under Zhen Studios banner starring Kishen Das and Smruthi Venkat in the lead roles alongside Raj Ayyappa and Bala Saravanan in pivotal roles.

Tharunam is set to be released in theatres on 2025 14 January Pongal Release

== Synopsis ==
Arjun is a CRPF officer who is on a sabbatical, and meets Meera at a wedding. As romance brews between them, on the sidelines, Meera is dealing with overtly one-side romantic advances from her neighbour Rohit. During one such instance, Meera loses her control and harms Rohit, hitting him dead. Now, it is up to Meera and Arjun to cover up the murder.

== Cast ==
- Kishen Das as Arjun
- Smruthi Venkat as Meera
- Raj Ayyappa as Rohit, Meera's friend
- Bala Saravanan as Vishwa, Arjun's friend and Meera's employee
- Sreeja Ravi as Meera's mother
- Geetha Kailasam as Rohit's mother
- Sujatha Babu as Arjun's mother

== Production ==
=== Development ===
In early June 2023, Mudhal Nee Mudivum Nee (2022) fame actor Kishen Das was announced to essay the lead role in Dejavu (2022) fame director Arvindh Srinivasan's romantic film titled Tharunam. Smruthi Venkat was roped in as the female lead in her second collaboration with Arvindh after Dejavu. The film is produced by Pugazh and Eden under Zhen Studios banner. The technical team consists of cinematographer Raja Bhattacharjee, editor Arul Elango Siddharth, art director Varnaalaya Jagadeesan, music composer Darbuka Siva and stunt choreographers Don Ashok and C Prabhu.

=== Filming and post-production ===
Initially the principal photography was planned to begin by 12 June 2023, but began on 22 June 2023 after a formal puja ceremony in Chennai. On 23 October 2023, Kishen announced that the dubbing work has begun and the entire production got wrapped on 30 December 2023.

== Music ==
Tharunam

Soundtrack album by Darbuka Siva
- Genre: Feature film soundtrack
- Language: Tamil
- Label: Think Music
- Producer: Darbuka Siva

Darbuka Siva chronology
Mathagam (2023)	Tharunam (2025)	Dominic and the Ladies' Purse (2025)

Singles from Tharunam
- 1. "Enai Neengathe Nee" Released: 10 February 2024; 2. "Kaatrai Ketten" Released: 13 January 2025

The soundtrack album is composed by Darbuka Siva in his second collaboration with Kishen Das after Mudhal Nee Mudivum Nee (2022) where the former was also the director of the film. The background score were composed by Ashwin Hemanth. The first single "Enai Neengathe Nee" released on 10 February 2024. The second single "Kaatrai Ketten" released on 13 January 2025.

Track listing
No.	Title	Lyrics	Singer(s)	Length
1.	"Enai Neengathe Nee"	Madhan Karky	Kapil Kapilan, Pavithra Chari	5:26
2.	"You and Me (Duet Version)"	Madhan Karky	Sathya Prakash, Shweta Mohan	4:00
3.	"Kaatrai Ketten"	Madhan Karky	Karthik	5:25
4.	"Fly High"	Madhan Karky & Iykki Berry	Pooja Venkat, Iykki Berry	5:03
5.	"You and Me (Solo Version)"	Madhan Karky	Shweta Mohan	4:00

== Release ==
=== Theatrical ===
Tharunam is set to be re-released in theatres on 31 January 2025. It was earlier released on 14 January 2025, but was pulled out from theatres as it got released only in a limited number of screens due to the delays in certification. Immediately on 15 January, it was announced that the film is pulled down from theatres and is postponed to release in another date.

== Critical reception ==
Abhinav Subramanian of The Times of India gave 3/5 stars and wrote "Tharunam keeps its story tight and its ambitions modest. It’s a film that knows exactly what it wants to be—and mostly succeeds." A critic of Dinamalar gave 2.25/5 stars, heavily criticizing the screenplay and illogical sequences.

Anusha Sundar of OTTPlay gave 1.5/5 stars and wrote "Tharunam wants to be a genre-shifting film that makes you get invested in romance from the first half, and a thriller of sorts in the second. But barely is the Kishen Das and Smruthi Venkat-starrer able to do it. With its shallow writing and far from reality storytelling, Tharunam becomes a drab watch." Sreejith Mullappilly of Cinema Express wrote "Tharunam also has an unconventional love story that does not veer away from the main plot. [...] The filmmaker has successfully crafted a film that draws its suspense and drama from the confluence of its carefully curated moments."
