= Darbar (film) =

2020 film directed by A. R. Murugadoss

- Theatrical release poster
- Directed by: AR Murugadoss
- Written by: AR Murugadoss
- Produced by: Allirajah Subaskaran
- Starring: Rajinikanth; Suniel Shetty; Nayanthara; Nivetha Thomas
- Cinematography: Santosh Sivan
- Edited by: A. Sreekar Prasad
- Music by: Anirudh Ravichander
- Production company: Lyca Productions
- Distributed by: Reliance Entertainment
- Release date: 9 January 2020
- Running time: 159 minutes
- Country: India
- Language: Tamil
- Budget: ₹190–240 crore (Note: Firstpost estimates the film's budget to be ₹190 crore, While The Indian Express and The Hindu reported the budget to be ₹200 crore, while DT Next estimated it as ₹240 crore.)
- Box office: est. ₹250 crore

Darbar (/ðərbɑːr/ transl. Court) is a 2020 Indian Tamil-language action thriller film written and directed by AR Murugadoss, and produced by Allirajah Subaskaran under the banner Lyca Productions. The film stars Rajinikanth, Suniel Shetty, Nayanthara and Nivetha Thomas. It follows Aaditya Arunasalam (Rajinikanth), the commissioner of Mumbai Police, who sets out to curb the city's rampant drug-trafficking and prostitution. When he uncovers a deep controversy linked to an international drug lord, however, he tries to fulfill his secret agenda.

The film is Rajinikanth's first role as a police officer in 27 years following Pandiyan (1992). The project's working title was Thalaivar 167 and the title Darbar was officially announced on 9 April 2019. Principal photography commenced the same month, mostly in Mumbai, and was completed in October 2019. Anirudh Ravichander composed the music for the film. The cinematographer was Santosh Sivan and the editor was A. Sreekar Prasad.

Darbar was released theatrically in India on 9 January 2020, coinciding with the Pongal festival. The film met with mixed reviews upon release with praise for Rajinikanth’s performance and grossed ₹250 crore at the box office, making it the highest-grossing Tamil film of 2020 and 4th highest-grossing Indian film of 2020.

Darbar became Rajinikanth’s fifth film to gross over ₹200 crore worldwide, following Enthiran, Kabali, 2.0, and Petta.

== Plot ==
Mumbai Police Commissioner Aditya Arunachalam kills gangsters in the city in police encounters. His behaviour received widespread condemnation, and the National Human Rights Commission of India decided to act against him. One of the panellists on the commission, a former friend of Aditya, discovers the murder of his daughter Valli sparked his killing spree.

In the past, a minister assigns Aditya to Mumbai as the new Commissioner to curb the rampant drug trafficking and prostitution in the city. Upon arriving in Mumbai, he rescues three kidnapped women, one of whom is the daughter of the Deputy Chief Minister of Maharashtra. Sensing an opportunity, Aditya uses the kidnapped women as an excuse to initiate a campaign against the city's drug trafficking and prostitution rings. His efforts are highly successful; the police arrest numerous drug dealers and child traffickers.

Among the arrested is Ajay Malhotra, the son of influential industrialist Vinod Malhotra, who attempts to bail out Ajay, but Aditya refuses bail. Aditya, seeking Ajay's testimony on his involvement in drug smuggling, visits him in prison and discovers a proxy in his place. He asks the state and central governments to investigate and discovers the officials assigned to Ajay's case work for Vinod. Through a covert investigation, Aditya learns Ajay is hiding in Bangkok and has the Royal Thai Police arrest him on passport fraud charges.

Corrupt diplomats on Vinod's payroll falsely declare Ajay imprisoned in India, which leads to his release from Thai custody. Undeterred, Aditya returns to India and has Ajay's proxy killed with the excuse of self-defence and announces that they will display Ajay's corpse to the media. Vinod's accomplices, cornered and with no other options, turn against him; to save themselves, they have Ajay secretly returned to India and killed. At Ajay's wake, however, it is revealed Ajay is not Vinod's son but that of feared mafia boss Hariharan "Hari" Chopra, who is responsible for the massacre of 17 policemen in Mumbai.

While in London, Hari learns of Ajay's murder. Vowing revenge, he secretly enters India via the Bangladesh–India border. Fearing for his life, Vinod contacts Aditya's daughter, Valli, and warns her that Aditya is in danger. Hari later stabs Vinod for his inability to protect Ajay, targets Aditya and Valli, and arranges a gruesome car accident. Aditya survives the attack, but Valli is diagnosed with a subdural hematoma, and her doctor tells her she has only two hours to live. Valli records a video for Aditya and dies. In his grief over her death, Aditya turns violent. Believing Vinod to be responsible for the car accident, Aditya barges into his residence but learns of his murder. Enraged and confused, Aditya sets out to discover the truth behind Valli's death and kills numerous gangsters in the process.

In the present, Hari's goons ambush Aditya and his subordinates. Although they survive the attack, they suspend Aditya for his rash behaviour. About to give up, he discovers Valli's video, in which she reveals Vinod's earlier warning and encourages Aditya to persevere with his investigation. Emboldened by the footage, Aditya gets reinstated by the police by proving his physical and mental stability. He then traces Ajay's true biological origins to Hari.

Attempting to evade Aditya, Hari organises the murders of numerous police officers. Undeterred, Aditya traces Hari's location to an old office building of Mumbai Media that media tycoon Pramod Gupta owns, who is one of Hari's associates. With the help of the police, Aditya launches a raid on the complex. He kills Hari's goons and captures Gupta but fails to capture Hari, who retreats to the site of his earlier massacre and lures Aditya by holding the families of the murdered police officers hostage at gunpoint. Aditya fights with Hari and wins. Hari attempts to shoot Aditya, but he throws a knife at Hari's neck then stabs him repeatedly to death. As Aditya walks out of the police station, a young boy dressed in a police uniform looks at him and salutes with a smile. Aditya returns the smile and salute.

== Cast ==
- Rajinikanth as Aaditya Arunachalam IPS, Commissioner of police in Mumbai city
- Nayanthara as Lilly
- Suniel Shetty as Hariharan "Hari" Chopra
- Nivetha Thomas as Vallikkannu, Aaditya's daughter
- Yogi Babu as Kaushik, Aaditya's friend
- Prateik Babbar as Ajay Chopra a.k.a. Ajay Malhotra
- Nawab Shah as Vinod Malhotra/Vinod Prathap
- Sriman as Lilly's cousin
- Dalip Tahil as Union Home Secretary
- Yograj Singh as the head of the gangsters
- Jatin Sarna as a gangster
- Adithya Shivpink as Ajay's proxy
- Shamata Anchan as a police inspector
- Raneesh Thyagarajan as a police inspector
- Shreya Gupto as Minister's daughter
- Sanjay Raghavan as a police inspector
- Soundariya Nanjundan as Lilly's cousin
- Manasvi Kottachi as Lilly's niece
- Rajesh Chintu as a police inspector
- Yusuf Hussain as Doctor
- Sumit Giri as a police inspector
- C. Ranganathan as Lilly's father
- Jeeva Subramanian as a item number in the song "Kannula Thimiru"

== Production ==
=== Development ===
In March 2015, Rajinikanth was reported to have signed his next film with AR Murugadoss and producer V. Ravichandran of Aascar Films; the project was reported to have been out on hold until his issue with the distributors over the financial losses of his film Lingaa (2014) was resolved. The project was never realised due to Ravichandran's bankruptcy.

On 25 September 2018, media reported Rajinikanth would collaborate with Murugadoss for his next project and would be financed by Sun Pictures, which produced the latter's Sarkar (2018) and the former's Petta (2019). On 25 November that year, Lyca Productions announced it would collaborate with Rajinikanth and Murugadoss again after their previous collaboration of the former's 2.0 (2018) and the latter's Kaththi (2014) . At an awards ceremony held in December 2018, Murugadoss stated the film was not about politics like some of his previous films but a "mass entertainer".

Production of the film began with the working title Thalaivar 167. Composer Anirudh Ravichander and cinematographer Santosh Sivan confirmed their involvement in the film. On 9 April 2019, Lyca Productions released the film's first-look poster on social media platforms, revealing the film's title as Darbar. The first look of Rajinikanth had him surrounded by police dogs, belts, badges and handcuffs. It was Rajinikanth's first role as a police officer after 27 years, his previous police role being in Pandiyan (1992). In an interview, Murugadoss stated the film is about a tough police officer like Alex Pandian, a character in Rajinikanth's Moondru Mugam (1982).

=== Casting ===
Nayanthara was confirmed as the film's female lead; it was her third collaboration with Rajinikanth after Chandramukhi (2005) and Sivaji: The Boss (2007), despite playing a cameo in the latter. It was earlier reported Bollywood actor Prateik Babbar would play the main antagonist in Darbar. Later reports said Suniel Shetty was cast as the lead antagonist, marking his full debut in Tamil cinema. Shetty agreed to play the antagonist despite declining previous offers to play antagonists in other Tamil films. Murugadoss approached Shetty while he was filming for Marakkar: Lion of the Arabian Sea, for which Shetty grew his hair long. Murugadoss wanted to do something special with Shetty's long hair; Shetty showed Murugadoss the look of his man bun, which was ultimately used for the film. In an interview, Shetty said Darbar is his first "meaty" role in Tamil cinema. Darbar is Yogi Babu's first collaboration with Rajinikanth.

=== Filming ===
On 4 April 2019, a photoshoot featuring Rajinikanth was held at a studio in Chennai. The stills which were leaked onto the internet and showed the actor in a cop avatar. Principal photography for the film began on 10 April in Mumbai. Images featuring Rajinikanth, Nivetha Thomas and Yogi Babu were also leaked onto the internet. On 3 May 2019, filming was suspended following reports of friction with college students at a campus that was being used as a location, and it later resumed. The film's first schedule was completed on 15 May.

The film's second schedule resumed on 29 May and ended on 30 June. Suniel Shetty joined the film's second schedule. On 5 June 2019, a video from the filming location was unofficially posted on the internet despite high security on the sets. The filmmakers reported a similar incident during the filming on the last week of June 2019. The team shifted location from Mumbai to Delhi, citing heavy rains. It was reported filming would finish in late August 2019.

After completing the film's second schedule, the makers took a 10-day-long break and filming resumed on 10 July 2019. On 25 July, Murugadoss shared images from the film showing Rajinikanth holding a sword and walking through a cloud of dust in a policeman's uniform; another image showed him looking happier and wearing a light blue suit. The final schedule of the film took place on 19 August 2019 in Jaipur, where two action sequences were filmed. On 11 October 2019, the makers announced they had completed filming. On 7 November 2019, Rajinikanth started dubbing for the film in Chennai and completed within two days.

== Music ==
Darbar

Soundtrack album by Anirudh Ravichander
- Released: 7 December 2019
- Recorded: 2019
- Studios: Albuquerque Records, Chennai
- Genre: Feature film soundtrack
- Language: Tamil
- Label: Divo
- Producer: Anirudh Ravichander

Anirudh Ravichander chronology
Gang Leader (2019)	Darbar (2019)	Dharala Prabhu (2020)

Anirudh Ravichander composed Darbar's soundtrack and score, marking his second collaboration with Rajinikanth after Petta (2019) and also with director A. R. Murugadoss after Kaththi (2014). "Thalaivar Theme", an instrumental theme for the film, was released on 7 November 2019 to accompany the motion poster. The film's first single "Chumma Kizhi", whose lyrics were written by Vivek and sung by S. P. Balasubrahmanyam, was released on 27 November 2019. The film's album was launched on 7 December 2019 at Jawaharlal Nehru Indoor Stadium, Chennai, in the presence of the film's cast and crew; it was made available to stream through the online streaming platform Gaana on the same day.

The film's soundtrack has an unreleased hidden song titled "Kannula Thimiru", which was recorded by trans-woman singers Chandramukhi, Rachana and Priya Murthi, and was performed live at the film's audio launch. For the song, Anirudh engaged veteran composer Deva to conduct the song's brass section; a making-of video of the song was released in mid January 2020 and went viral on the internet.

Sify stated "the soundtrack album is quite disappointing as compared to Rajinikanth's earlier film Petta, due to the unimpressive lyrics but it touches the listener's soul and enables them to sing along".

All lyrics are written by Vivek, except "Thani Vazhi" which had lyrics by Yogi B, Senthuzhan and Syan

Track listing
No.	Title	Singer(s)	Length
1.	"Chumma Kizhi"	S. P. Balasubrahmanyam, Anirudh Ravichander	3:50
2.	"Dumm Dumm"	Nakash Aziz	4:38
3.	"Thalaivar Theme" (Instrumental)		0:43
4.	"Thani Vazhi"	Anirudh Ravichander, Shakthisree Gopalan, Yogi B	3:26
5.	"Tharam Maara Single"	Anirudh Ravichander, Arjun Chandy	3:48
6.	"Villain Theme" (Instrumental)		1:05
7.	"Kannula Thimiru"	Chandramukhi, Rachana, Priya Murthi	3:12
Total length:			19:22

== Release ==
=== Theatrical ===
The film was scheduled to release on 11 January 2020 but in November 2019, the release was preponed to 9 January to get the benefits of the extended holiday weekend because that year's Pongal fell on 15 January. Darbar opened in 7,000 screens worldwide, including 4,000 screens in India.

On 7 January 2020, the Madras High Court blocked the film's release in Malaysia after its producer failed to pay a debt of ₹23 crore to its distributor. The court later revoked the claim after Lyca Productions showed a bank guarantee of ₹4.9 crores.

=== Distribution ===
The Hindi-dubbed version of the film was sold to Reliance Entertainment, which released the film in North Indian cinemas.

=== Marketing ===
The motion poster of Darbar was released on 7 November 2019. Kamal Haasan, Salman Khan, Mohanlal and Mahesh Babu released the film's posters. The film's trailer was released at a launch event in Mumbai on 16 December, with Rajinikanth, Suniel Shetty and Murugadoss in attendance.

To make the film's promotion unique, the filmmakers wrapped a SpiceJet aeroplane with Darbar Rajini livery. The external branding of the aircraft bore an image of Rajinikanth in police uniform.

Speaking to The Hindu, R. Kannan, chief operating officer (COO) of Lyca Productions said, "The film will release in 7,000 screens across the world. We are planning to release it in a few islands to reach out to the maximum number of people". He said around ₹70–80 million was being spent on promoting the film, calling the marketing investment "one of the highest in Tamil cinema". Kannan said around 15 brands such as SpiceJet, Cadbury's, BookMyShow and Airtel had marketing deals with the film.

=== Home media ===
The film was made available to stream on Amazon Prime Video on 24 February 2020.

== Critical response ==
Critics gave Darbar mixed reviews. On the review aggregator website Rotten Tomatoes, 50% of 8 critics' reviews are positive, with an average rating of 6.2/10.

Sreedhar Pillai, writing for Firstpost gave Darbar a rating of two-and-tree-quarter stars out of five and stated "The first half of Darbar is enjoyable mainly due to Rajinikanth's style and swagger". Saibal Chatterjee of NDTV gave the film two-and-a-half stars out of five and wrote "Darbar is targeted fair and square at Rajinikanth fans, but it does nothing to give masala cinema a fresh shot of energy". Writing for The Times of India, M Suganth gave three stars out of five and stated "Darbar is an engaging commercial cocktail of action and drama". Shubhra Gupta, editor-in-chief of The Indian Express, gave two-and-a-half stars out of five and stated "Darbar remains a Rajinikanth film which bows at each step to the continuing myth of the one and only Thalaivar". S Srivatsan from The Hindu stated "Despite A.R. Murugadoss offering very little substance for him to work with, the superstar just about manages to carry this film on his aging shoulders".

Sify gave two-and-a-half stars out of five and stated, "Darbar is an average cop action entertainer packed to satisfy the appetite of the die-hard fans of Thalaivar". Karthik Kumar of Hindustan Times wrote "AR Murugadoss plays on Rajinikanth's strength and swag, but everything else in this film gets a lackadaisical treatment". Baradwaj Rangan wrote for Film Companion, "The film falls in a no-man's land, where the drama and the action is neither powerful nor punchy enough". India Today gave two-and-a-half stars out of five, stating "Barring a clichéd and predictable storyline, Darbar is strictly a film by a Rajinikanth fan for Thalaivar's fans". Sowmya Rajendran of The News Minute gave two-and-a-half stars out of five, and stated "Despite being a stale and predictable cop film, it's Rajinikanth's trademark swag that keeps the scenes alive". News18 gave three stars out of five, stating "Darbar is a terrific entertainer that has its shortcomings and dull moments, but Rajinikanth fans won't be disappointed". Manoj Kumar R. of The Indian Express wrote, "Murugadoss is among the handful of Tamil filmmakers who enjoy the reputation of making sensible and meaningful commercial films as opposed to churning out just brain-dead popcorn fare. And Darbar is the opposite of what we have come to expect of the director."

== Box office ==
=== Pre-release revenue ===
The film's pre-release rights for Darbar were sold for ₹220 crore (US$24 million). Tamil Nadu theatrical rights of the film were sold for ₹60 crore (US$6.4 million), rights in Kerala were sold for ₹6 crore (US$640,000).

=== Box office ===
==== India ====
Darbar earned ₹18 crore in Tamil Nadu on its first day of release. It grossed ₹135 crore at the domestic box office in the first 11 days of its release. After its theatrical run, in Kerala and Karnataka it collected ₹18–20 crore and ₹35 crore respectively. It earned around ₹30 crore from Andhra Pradesh and Telangana, and around ₹15 crore from the Hindi version.

==== Other territories ====
Darbar grossed over ₹200 crore worldwide in the 11 days after its release. The film grossed US$400,000 on its opening day in the United States. In its opening weekend, Darbar earned $1 million (₹7.09 crore) in the US. Darbar earned approximately ₹70 crore in the overseas market in the first 11 days of its release.

Darbar entered the Top Five of the worldwide box office for the weekend ending 12 January 2020, following an estimated global opening of US$21.2 million.

Darbar has topped box office charts in several countries, including Malaysia, the UAE, the USA, Australia, New Zealand, and Singapore.

Trade reports indicate that Darbar has taken the No. 1 spot at the Malaysian box office within just a few days of release. Even without counting certain Indian-owned cinemas, the film remains firmly at No. 1.

Besides Malaysia, Darbar is also delivering a strong performance at the Australian box office. In just 10 days, the film has collected $4,818,772 (approximately ₹23 crore) and continues to hold the top position.

==== Re-release in Japan ====
Darbar was re-released as Dalbar Revenge, in Japan's theatre chain MKC Plex on 16 July 2021, and ran with a full house for a week. The film was supposed to be screened until 21 July but its run was extended to the end of July. According to some reports, it ran until August in some cities. According to Sify:

Multiple shows are being added for [Darbar] in Japan. Huge demand for tickets there. Distributors are very happy with the profits ... According to reports, the movie has created quite a rage among fans. This is likely to be screened in more cities such as Kyoto, Nagoya, and Niigata, among others.

According to media reports, Darbar grossed ¥230 million in Japan. The film earned approximately ₹15 crore. Darbar is the second-highest-grossing film for Rajinikanth in Japan after Muthu and fourth-highest grossing Indian film in Japan.

== Controversies ==
=== Political statements ===
Darbar includes two scenes in which characters speak of prison inmates being allowed to go out and shop. The dialogues in either scene are not spoken by Rajinikanth but he is present in the scenes. Lyca Productions announced it would be removing controversial dialogue from the film, which was deemed to be a reference to V. K. Sasikala, the jailed associate of former chief minister J. Jayalalithaa. Lyca Productions released a statement on Twitter saying these scenes were included with the intention of entertaining audiences and do not refer to any individual.

=== Piracy ===
Shortly after its theatrical release on 9 January 2020, Darbar was leaked online by the notorious piracy website TamilRockers, leading to widespread distribution of unauthorized copies across the internet within hours of release. According to The Times of India, pirated versions of the film quickly began circulating, particularly through the messaging platform WhatsApp, causing concern for the producers due to potential financial losses and infringement of copyright.

In response to the leak, the film’s production company, Lyca Productions, urged audiences to report users who were sharing complete copies of the movie on WhatsApp in an effort to curb further distribution of the pirated content. Lyca Productions also approached law enforcement authorities regarding the piracy issue, lodging complaints and requesting strict action against those involved in unauthorized sharing. Reports indicated that some local incidents of piracy, including the illegal telecast of the film by a cable television operator in Madurai, resulted in police action.

=== Distributor's losses and impact ===
Though Darbar became the highest-grossing Tamil film of 2020, grossing ₹202–250, several distributors claimed that they incurred significant financial losses due to the film’s high acquisition costs and pre-release rights pricing. Trade analysts estimated that distributors collectively suffered losses of around ₹70 crore. It did not perform well in other Indian states, including Andhra Pradesh and Telangana, due to competition from Ala Vaikunthapurramuloo and Sarileru Neekevvaru, and the Hindi version was unsuccessful at the box office due to a lack of promotion.

Following unsuccessful discussions with Lyca Productions, a group of distributors attempted to approach Rajinikanth seeking financial relief. Media reports stated that some distributors threatened protests, including hunger strikes, if their concerns were not addressed. Industry commentators later compared the situation to earlier Rajinikanth films such as Baba (2002), Kuselan (2008) and Lingaa (2014).

Trade publications attributed the dispute primarily to the film’s high production and acquisition costs. Reports indicated that Rajinikanth and director A. R. Murugadoss received substantial remuneration, contributing to an increased production budget, while the film’s distribution rights were sold at premium rates. Some commentators cited the episode as part of a broader industry debate on the financial risks associated with high-budget star-driven films.

=== Exhibitor response and claims of profitability ===
In contrast to the claims of distributor losses, several theatre owners and exhibitors publicly stated that Darbar performed profitably in their respective cinemas. According to The Times of India, multiple exhibitors across Tamil Nadu and other regions took to social media to refute reports describing the film as a loss-making venture. Theatre operators including Maharaja Multiplex (Erode), LMR Multiplex Theatres (Namakkal), and Jayamaruthi Cinemas (Gobichettipalayam) reported that Darbar enjoyed strong footfalls and sustained runs, with some exhibitors claiming that the film outperformed earlier Tamil blockbusters such as Bigil, Viswasam, and Petta at their venues. Maharaja Multiplex stated that the film ran for 22 days at their property and surpassed their previous box-office records.

Exhibitors from outside Tamil Nadu also echoed similar views. Arora Talkies (Mumbai) described Darbar as the most profitable Tamil film screened at their theatre, while exhibitors in Karnataka reported a favourable audience response. Several theatre owners dismissed circulating reports of losses as "rumours" and emphasised that the film delivered satisfactory returns at the exhibition level. The Times of India noted that these statements highlighted a disconnect between distributor-level performance and theatre-level earnings, suggesting that while certain distributors may have struggled due to high acquisition costs, individual cinemas in multiple territories were able to generate profits from theatrical screenings.

== See also ==
- Lingaa loss issues
