= Theerpugal Virkapadum =

Tamil-language film

- Theatrical release poster
- Directed by: Dheran
- Produced by: Sajeev Meerasahib Rawther, C R Saleem and Partners
- Starring: Sathyaraj; Madhusudhan Rao; Harish Uthaman; Smruthi Venkat
- Cinematography: Anji
- Edited by: Noufal Abdullah
- Music by: S. N. Prasad
- Production companies: HoneyBee Creations in association with Infinity Frames & AL-Tari movies
- Release date: 31 December 2021
- Running time: 114 minutes
- Country: India
- Language: Tamil

Theerpugal Virkapadum (transl. Judgements for sale) is a 2021 Indian Tamil-language vigilante thriller film directed by Dheran, starring Sathyaraj, Madhusudhan Rao, Smruthi Venkat and Harish Uthaman. The film is completely shot in 8K resolution and has cinematography by Garudavega Anji. It also has a dubbed Telugu version titled as Emergency.

== Summary ==
Dr. Nalan Kumar, who seems to be in his early 60s, kidnaps the son of an influential businessman Rudhravel and threatens to kill the youngster if he fails to perform certain tasks assigned to him. Later, Rudhravel gets to know who is behind his son's kidnap. He, along with his nephew Rajendran, decides to take on the sexagenarian after realizing why he is after them.

== Cast ==
- Sathyaraj as Dr. Nalan Kumar
- Madhusudhan Rao as Rudhravel
- Harish Uthaman as Rajendran
- Yuvan Mayilsamy as Kishore
- Smruthi Venkat as Bharathi
- Renuka as Dr. Aruna Stephen Raj
- Charle as Dr. Parthiban
- Sriranjani as Kishore's mother
- Yas as Yogeshwaran (Yoga)
- George Maryan as Court Attender
- Jeeva Ravi as Aruna's husband
- Lollu Sabha Manohar as Rudravel's staff
- Kalaiarasan as Rudhravel's staff
- Lizzie Antony as Doctor
- Pondy Ravi as Defense Lawyer
- Subramani as Public Prosecutor
- Gajaraj as DSP Ashok Krishna
- Faheem as Bullet Rider

== Production ==
Debutant director Dheran who has directed several advertisements brought in actor Sathyaraj to play the solo lead in Theerpugal Virkapadum, produced by Sajeev Meerasahib Rawther under his banner HoneyBee Creations and his partners. Dheeran took three years to complete the script before approaching the producer. Actress Smruthi Venkat of Thadam fame was signed to play the daughter character of Sathyaraj with actors Harish Uthaman, Lizzie Antony and Madhusudhan in important roles. Sathyaraj refused to opt for a body double in action sequences as per reports and completed his dubbing in a single stretch of 12 hours. The film was completed in three schedules and was primarily shot in Chennai.

== Soundtrack ==
The soundtrack was composed by S. N. Prasad.

Theerpugal Virkapadum

Soundtrack album by S. N. Prasad
- Released: 2021
- Genre: Soundtrack
- Label: Lahari Music
- Producer: S. N. Prasad

S. N. Prasad chronology
Irandam Kuththu (2020)	Theerpugal Virkapadum (2021)	Kaatteri (2022)

Track listing
No.	Title	Lyrics	Singer(s)	Length
1.	"Yaarum Ingu"		Benny Dayal
2.	"Mavale Mavale"	Srikanth Varadan	Sean Roldan, S. N. Prasad	3:22
3.	"Rudra"		Ganesan Sekar

== Critical reception ==
Thinkal Menon gave the film 3 stars, complimenting the writing and several performances but felt the plot was repetitive and predictable.
