= Meetha Raghunath =

Indian actress

- Born: Ooty, Tamil Nadu, India
- Occupation: Actress
- Years active: 2022–present

Meetha Raghunath is an Indian actress who appears in Tamil language films and television. She is best known for her performance in Good Night (2023).

== Early life ==
Meetha was born and raised in Ooty in a middle-class family, and studied in Coimbatore. She has a sister, and their mother is a teacher. As a child, Meetha was active in school plays, which sparked her interest in acting. She said she rarely watched films in her childhood, and as a result did not have too many film influences. As of 2025, Meetha's parents were living in Coimbatore.

== Career ==
Meetha made her film debut through Darbuka Siva's Mudhal Nee Mudivum Nee (2022), for which she learnt method acting, before starring in the streaming series Five Six Seven Eight later the same year, and the film Good Night (2023). Regarding her performance in Good Night, a critic wrote that "the director's decision to cast Meetha as Manikandan's love interest favours the film. Others might have struggled to pull off that sort of innocent look on-screen. Meetha carried her role perfectly, without any flaws". For her performance, Meetha was nominated for the SIIMA Award for Best Actress – Tamil, and won the JFW Award for Best Actress in a Lead Role. In November 2023, she got engaged in Ooty, and married in March 2024 but has not disclosed the name of her husband. After marriage, she signed her next film in July the same year, tentatively titled Siddharth 40. The film, later titled 3BHK, was released in 2025. Regarding her performance, a critic called her character "endearing" and felt that her "camaraderie with the entire family sparkles".

== Other interests ==
Since childhood, Meetha has been an ardent fan of literature, especially the works of Japanese writer Haruki Murakami. A native Badaga speaker, she is fluent in English, Tamil and Hindi, has a general understanding of Telugu and Malayalam, and has tried learning Korean, French and German. Meetha is also an aspiring writer; initially interested only in poetry, she later expanded to other forms of writing. In August 2025, she revealed she had been writing a book for some years and intends to complete it.

== Filmography ==
=== Film ===
Year	Title	Role	Notes
2022	Mudhal Nee Mudivum Nee	Rekha	
2023	Good Night	Anu	
2025	3BHK	Aarthi	

=== Television ===
Year	Title	Role	Network
2022	Five Six Seven Eight	Swetha	ZEE5
