= Kishen Das =

Actor and YouTuber

- Born: 26 April 1997 (age 29); Chennai, Tamil Nadu
- Education: Loyola College, Chennai
- Occupations: Actor; host; social media influencer
- Years active: 2004; 2016–present
- Known for: Mudhal Nee Mudivum Nee, Netflix show Menu Please
- Spouse: Suchithra Kumar (m. 2025)
- Parent: Brinda Das

Kishen Das is an Indian actor, content creator and YouTuber. He is known for his role in the Tamil film Mudhal Nee Mudivum Nee. Kishen also hosts the popular show Menu Please on YouTube for Netflix, some of his guests over the years have been Anil Kapoor, Shahid Kapoor, Vijay Sethupathi, Gautham Vasudev Menon, Neeraj Madhav etc.

== Early life ==
Kishen was born on 26 April 1997 in Chennai. His mother Brinda Das is a former theatre and television actor. Kishen ventured into theatre in Chettinad Vidyashram, under the guidance of Jayakumar Janakiraman of Koothu-P-Pattarai. His interest for performing and acting began just around then and was a part of Chennai's theatre circuit till college. He studied Visual Communication at Loyola College, Chennai.

== Career ==
Kishen ventured out in search of some work when he found Fully Filmy. Kishen's association with Fully Filmy began in 2016 when he was working part-time and studying at Loyola and went on till 2019 when he decided to actively look for acting work. During his time at Fully Filmy, he was known for Fully Rewind, a show wherein he would present listicles about cinema and the infamous '2 minute reviews' which were popular back then.

His podcast 'Timepass with Das' which he began in 2019 officially became a Spotify Original in May 2022.

In 2019, Kishen made his adult acting debut in Nerkonda Paarvai where he played a minor role as Andrea Tariang's friend. During his stint at Fully Filmy, he came across an audition announcement for a film shared by Gautham Vasudev Menon in an untitled project directed by Mr X a.k.a. Darbuka Siva. They began filming this ensemble in 2019 with updates on the project, songs, and teasers consecutively. The title of the film was revealed to be Mudhal Nee Mudivum Nee. Kishen played the role of Vinoth, a school going boy whose love for music and hatred for studies overtook everything in life. His love for Rekha and his dynamic with Rekha dictated his storyline in the film. The film won multiple awards and special mentions since its release.

In 2023, Kishen's second outing as a lead was Sync, a horror film that released on aha. In 2024's Singapore Saloon, he played RJ Balaji's friend. In 2025, he starred in the romantic action thriller Tharunam.

In 2025, Kishen Das's Aaromaley was released in theatres in November 2025.

== Personal life ==
Kishen's parents are divorced. His family traces its origins to Kozhikode. In March 2024, Kishen got engaged to Suchithra Kumar. They were married on 31 January 2025.

== Filmography ==
Year	Title	Role	Ref
2004	Bose	Bose's nephew	Child artist
2019	Nerkonda Paarvai	Andrea's friend	
2022	Mudhal Nee Mudivum Nee	Vinoth	
2024	Singapore Saloon	Basheer	
2025	Tharunam	Arjun	
2025	Aaromaley	Ajith	Also screenwriter
TBD	Eerapadham Kaatru Mazhai	Kani	Filming

Music video

Year	Film	Role	Ref.
2024	Kaadhal Alaipayuthey	Narrator	
