= Aaromaley =

Indian Tamil-language romantic comedy buddy film

- Theatrical Release Poster
- Directed by: Sarang Thiagu
- Written by: Sarang Thiagu
- Screenplay by: Sarang Thiagu; Kishen Das; Kaushik Sampath; Ashameera Aiyappan (additional); Bipin R. (additional)
- Produced by: S. Vinod Kumar
- Starring: Kishen Das; Shivathmika Rajashekar
- Cinematography: Gowtham Rajendran
- Edited by: Praveen Antony
- Music by: Siddhu Kumar
- Production company: Mini Studio LLP
- Distributed by: Ayngaran International
- Release date: 7 November 2025
- Running time: 127 minutes
- Country: India
- Language: Tamil
- Budget: ₹4 crore

Aaromaley (transl. O Beloved) is an Indian Tamil-language romantic comedy buddy film written and directed by Sarang Thiagu in his debut, starring Kishen Das and Shivathmika Rajashekar in the lead roles, alongside Harshath Khan and VTV Ganesh in important roles. The film is produced by S. Vinod Kumar under his Mini Studio LLP banner, while the technical team consists of cinematographer Gowtham Rajendran, editor Praveen Antony and music composer Siddhu Kumar.

Aaromaley was released in theatres on 7 November 2025 to positive reviews from critics and audiences.

== Plot ==
In his teenage years, Ajith becomes inspired by Vinnaithaandi Varuvaayaa and begins to believe that love makes everything work in life. In school and later college, he falls in love and both romances with both girls end up failing. Throughout this he always has his childhood friend who thinks his obsession with love is silly. However, his obsession for love does not end. He then goes to wedding at a church and stops the bride who is walking in by saying that he loves her and tried to stop the wedding. The bride yells at him. He gets kicked out of the wedding and in the process breaks the windshield of the car. As a result, the bride's family lodges a police complaint. His father bails him and his friend out.

When his father takes him home, he asks his father to not tell his mother anything. However his father does tell his mother who yells at him. She asks his father to set Ajith with a job at his friend Xavier's matrimonial office. After arguing with his family, he finally accepts to go into work for his father's friend.

At the matrimonial office, on his first day he hears a girl (Anjali) humming on the elevator. They both get off on the same floor and he is immediately struck by her beauty. During his intro with Xavier, he is paired with Mayur who teaches him the ropes and tells him Anjali is very strict. Anjali soon becomes Ajith's nightmare and he wants to quit.

However, love eventually blossoms between the pair. The film revolves around him and his various attempts to survive in his current job, whilst navigating his humorous love for Anjali.

== Cast ==
- Kishen Das as Ajith
- Shivathmika Rajashekar as Anjali
- Harshath Khan as Sachin
- VTV Ganesh as Narasimhan
- Santhana Bharathi as Xavier
- Sibi Chakravarthy as Mayur
- Raja Rani Pandian as Ajith's father
- Tulasi as Ajith's mother
- Nitish Chandrasekar as Shyam
- Namritha MV as Megha
- Sandhya Winfred as Smithy
- Kathadi Ramamurthy as Anjali's grandfather
- Silambarasan as the Narrator (voice)
- Megha Akash as Sneha (cameo appearance)
- Teejay Arunasalam as Michael, Anjali's Abusive Ex-boyfriend (cameo appearance)

== Production ==
In late-May 2025, Kishen Das' next film after Tharunam (2025), with director Sarang Thiagu was announced through a glimpse video, starring the director himself, Kishen Das and Dragon (2025) fame Harshath Khan. The film marks the directorial debut of Sarang Thiagu, the son of yesteryear Actor Thyagu. The film stars Shivathmika Rajashekar as the female lead alongside Megha Akash, VTV Ganesh and others in important roles. Production got wrapped during the announcement in late-May 2025. The film is produced by S. Vinod Kumar under his Mini Studio LLP banner, while the technical team consists of cinematographer Gowtham Rajendran, editor Praveen Antony handling editing and script supervision, music composer Siddhu Kumar, production designer Manikandan Srinivasan and stunt choreographer Om Prakash.

== Music ==
Aaromaley

Soundtrack album by Siddhu Kumar
- Genre: Feature film soundtrack
- Language: Tamil
- Producer: Siddhu Kumar

Siddhu Kumar chronology
Aan Paavam Pollathathu (2025)	Aaromaley (2025)

Singles from Aaromaley
- 1. "Dandanakka Life'U" Released: 20 June 2025; 2. "Eppadi Vandhaayo" Released: 4 October 2025; 3. "Mannaru Vandhaaru" Released: 23 October 2025

The music was composed by Siddhu Kumar. The first single titled "Dandanakka Life'U" was released on 20 June 2025. The second single titled "Eppadi Vandhaayo" was released on 4 October 2025. The third single titled "Mannaru Vandhaaru" was released on 23 October 2025. The full album Consisting of 7 songs was released on 26 November 2025.

Track listing
No.	Title	Lyrics	Singer(s)	Length
1.	"Eppadi Vandhaayo"	Vignesh Ramakrishna	Chinmayi Sripada, Anand Aravindakshan	2:49
2.	"Dho Pogura"	Mohan Rajan	Aravind Karneeswaran	3:20
3.	"Dandanakka Life'U"	Vishnu Edavan	T. Rajendar, OfRo	3:21
4.	"Mannaru Vandhaaru"	Vignesh Ramakrishna	Sublahshini	2:37
5.	"Valiye Valiye"	Vignesh Ramakrishna	Sooraj Santhosh, The Indian Choral Ensemble	2:49
6.	"Theerum Kadhal"	Mu.Vi	Adithya RK	3:14
7.	"Eppadi Vandhaayo (Reprise)"	Vignesh Ramakrishna	Lakshmikanth.M	1:35
Total length:				19:45

== Release ==
Aaromaley was released in theatres on 7 November 2025.

Home Media:

Aaromaley Began streaming in JioHotstar From 12 December 2025.

== Reception ==
Akshay Kumar of Cinema Express gave 3/5 stars and wrote "Aaromaley is a welcome shift in this genre, also for its treatment of both the flashback technique and past relationships. There is no toxicity involved and no weaponising of your partner's past to scorekeep. [...] Aaromaley succeeds in doing away with the dreaminess of love while retaining its cute and sweet parts." Anusha Sundar of OTT Play gave 3/5 stars and wrote "Aaromaley is a sweet, breezy, and comfort watch, that never overdoes its elements. There is feather-light approach in storytelling that makes it for an easy viewing. With neat performances, solid writing, and narrative laced with fun, Aaromaley makes you feel refreshing with subtle takeaways." Janani K of India Today gave 3/5 stars and wrote "Director Sarang Thiagu's 'Aaromaley', starring Kishen Das, Shivathmika and Harshath Khan, is a warm and fuzzy romantic entertainer that is all heart. Strong characterisations and realistic conversations make us look past minor shortcomings." Abhinav Subramanian of The Times of India gave 2.5/5 stars and wrote "Aaromaley hits its marks without breaking a sweat. The romance resolves, the laughs arrive on schedule, and everyone learns their lesson about opening their hearts. It's competent enough to keep you engaged while the runtime ticks by, but there's nothing here that lingers."
