= Hit List (2024 film) =

Indian action film by Sooryakathir and Karthikeyan

- Theatrical release poster
- Directed by: Soorya Kathir Kakkallar; K Karthikeyan
- Written by: S.Devaraj
- Produced by: K. S. Ravikumar
- Starring: R. Sarathkumar; Vijay Kanishka; Gautham Vasudev Menon
- Edited by: John Abraham
- Music by: C. Sathya
- Production company: RK Celluloids
- Release date: 31 May 2024
- Country: India
- Language: Tamil

Hit List is a 2024 Indian Tamil-language action thriller film directed by Soorya Kathir Kakkallar and K. Karthikeyan and produced by K. S. Ravikumar under the banner RK Celluloids. The film stars R. Sarathkumar and Vijay Kanishka, alongside Gautham Vasudev Menon, Smruthi Venkat, Munishkanth and others in supporting roles.

== Plot ==
Vijay is an IT professional who lives with his mother and his younger sister, Keerthi. Vijay follows vegetarianism and Vallalar's ideologies, hoping not to harm living creatures. One day, Vijay's mother and sister get kidnapped by a masked man who calls and threatens Vijay. ACP Yazhvendan investigates the case. The masked man calls Vijay and wants him to break into the house of a local don, Kaali, and fight him; failing would lead to Vijay's mother and sister being killed. Meanwhile, the police try to find the masked man's location but in vain.

Initially, Vijay hesitates to follow the masked man's commands, but later, fearing his mother and sister's safety, he agrees. He goes into Kaali's house and fights him single-handedly. Surprisingly, Kaali is beaten to death by Vijay. Dr. Karunakaran is the dean of a government hospital, and the masked man kidnaps his son as well. Karuna and Vijay arrive at a location specified by the masked man. Now, the masked man comes online and reveals the truth about Karuna.

During the COVID-19 lockdown, there was a severe shortage of oxygen cylinders in hospitals. Karuna misused his power and illegally sold the oxygen cylinders from government hospitals to private hospitals. Dr. Anitha, who worked in Karuna's hospital, tried to expose him; however, Kaali and his henchmen stabbed and killed her. The masked man wants Vijay to beat Karuna to release his mother and sister. Following an intense fight, Vijay kills Karuna. The masked man releases Vijay's mother and sister.

Yazh traces the masked man's location and rushes to arrest him. However, it is too late, as the masked man flees the place. Vijay gets acquitted in this case as he has committed the murders to save his mother and sister. Later, Yazh meets Vijay and reveals he knows the masked man's real identity: Vijay. He asks what motivated Vijay's actions, and a flashback is shown.

Anitha was Vijay's elder sister. Vijay's father was infected with COVID-19 and admitted to the hospital. When there was a shortage of oxygen cylinders, Vijay's father gave his oxygen cylinder to save a pregnant woman, leading to him dying from suffocation. Vijay and his family wanted revenge for this, and they waited for a couple of years, sketching a proper plan to expose Karuna and also kill him. Yazh understands Vijay's intentions and does not disclose this to anyone.

== Cast ==
- Vijay Kanishka as Vijay
- R. Sarathkumar as ACP K. Yazhvendhan
- Gautham Vasudev Menon as Dean Dr. Karunakaran
- Samuthirakani as Vijay's father
- Munishkanth as Inspector Lingam
- Redin Kingsley as Vijay's neighbor
- Sithara as Vijay's mother
- Smruthi Venkat as Dr. Anitha
- Ramachandra Raju as Kaali
- Ramachandran Durairaj
- Aishwarya Dutta as Aishwarya, Vijay's coworker
- Abi Nakshatra as Keerthi, Vijay's sister
- Anupama Kumar as Home Minister Latha Periyasami
- Bala Saravanan as Bala, Vijay's coworker
- P. L. Thenappan
- Shaji Chen
- Raja Rani Pandian
- Poster Nandakumar
- Janani Ashok Kumar as Kumudha, Yazhvendhan's wife
- Billy Murali

== Production ==
The film's announcement was made on August 31, 2022. A puja ceremony was held on Thursday, September 1, 2022, in Chennai to mark the launch of the production of Hit List. It was announced that director Vikraman’s son, Vijay Kanishka, will play a lead role.

== Release ==
The film was released on 31 May 2024 in theatres to mixed reviews. The film was released on streaming platforms of Amazon Prime Video and Aha Tamil on 09 July 2024.

=== Critical reception ===
A critic from The New Indian Express wrote that the film's "core message, though important, feels somewhat dated. Nevertheless, the film has its heart in the right place, with the message reflecting a real-life injustice". A critic from The Times of India rated the film two-and-a-half out of five stars and wrote that "Directed by duo Sooryakathir and K. Karthikeyan, Hitlist has its moments. Some good camerawork and sound design create the necessary suspense. A decent thriller for a lazy afternoon". A critic from OTTplay gave the film the same rating and wrote that "Hit List makes it to the list of films that are made with true and sincere intentions. But that alone isn't enough in an era of filmmaking that has surpassed merely having good notions". A critic from Times Now gave the film the same rating and wrote that "Directors Sooryakathir Kaakkallar and K Karthikeyan seem to have a solid script on paper. However, where they seem to have faltered is in getting that script convincingly transferred onto the screen". A critic from The South First wrote that "It is one of those thrillers you don't mind sitting through when you don't have much to do".
