= Chettinad Vidyashram =

Location
- Chettinad House, R.A.Puram; Chennai, Tamil Nadu; India; 13.017091°N 80.269294°E

Information
- Type: Private
- Motto: Strive, Save & Serve
- Established: 1986
- Founder: kumara Rani Meena Muthiah
- Principal: DR S Amudha Lakshmi
- Enrollment: 1000+
- Campus: Urban
- Area: 1.5 acres (6,100 m^{2})
- Colours: Violet and White
- Publication: Vision
- Affiliation: CBSE
- Website: chettinadvidyashram.org

Chettinad Vidyashram is a co-educational, independent day school located in Chennai, India. It was founded in 1986 by Kumara Rani of Chettinad, Meena Muthiah, a philanthropist and educationalist based in Chennai. The school is affiliated with the CBSE and is situated in the MRC Nagar area. Chettinad Vidyashram is noted for its large campus and significant student enrollment, with approximately 12000 students attending its primary, high, and higher secondary classes.

== Annual events ==
=== Maithri ===
Maithri is a biennial cultural festival hosted by Chettinad Vidyashram. It is one among the largest school cultural in South India with a budget of ₹5-6 lakh allocated.It is conducted once in two years.trailer by students are usual especially trailer on first day in year 2026 was notable

== Ampersand ==
Ampersand is a yearly debate competition hosted by Chettinad Vidyashram, usually taking place in the month of June.

== Notable alumni ==
- G.V. Prakash, film actor and music director
- Lakshmipathy Balaji, former cricketer
- Saindhavi, playback singer
- Apoorva Arora, actor
- Aishwarya R. Dhanush, film director and daughter of Rajinikanth
- Dinesh Karthik, Indian cricketer
- Kishen Das, actor
- Gautham Karthik, film actor
- Mahat Raghavendra, film actor
- Minisha Lamba, film actress
- Allari Naresh, film actor
- Saisharan, playback singer and winner of Airtel Super Singer
- Sai Dharam Tej, film actor
- Manimaran Siddharth, Indian cricketer
- Nakshatra Nagesh, film actress
- Shabeer Kallarakkal, film actor
- Bhavana Balakrishnan, film actress
- Padmalatha, singer
