= Dominic and the Ladies' Purse =

2025 film by Gautham Vasudev Menon

- Theatrical release poster
- Directed by: Gautham Vasudev Menon
- Screenplay by: Gautham Vasudev Menon; Neeraj Rajan; Sooraj Rajan
- Story by: Neeraj Rajan
- Produced by: Mammootty
- Starring: Mammootty; Gokul Suresh
- Cinematography: Vishnu Dev
- Edited by: Anthony
- Music by: Darbuka Siva
- Production company: Mammootty Kampany
- Distributed by: Wayfarer Films
- Release date: 23 January 2025
- Running time: 152 minutes
- Country: India
- Language: Malayalam
- Budget: ₹19 crore
- Box office: est. ₹20.03 crore

Dominic and the Ladies' Purse is a 2025 Indian Malayalam-language mystery crime comedy thriller film directed by Gautham Vasudev Menon, in his Malayalam directoral debut, and produced by Mammootty Kampany. Starring Mammootty in the main role, alongside debutant Sushmitha Bhat, Gokul Suresh, Meenakshi Unnikrishnan, Viji Venkatesh and Vineeth. The film revolves around a sharp but disgraced ex-cop, who knows all the right moves and is now a detective, as he takes on a simple job to find the owner of a purse.

The film was officially announced in July 2024 under the tentative title Production No: VI, as it was the sixth production venture for Mammootty, and the official title was announced that September. Principal photography commenced in the same month in Kochi. Music was composed by Darbuka Siva, cinematography by Vishnu Dev, and editing by Lewellyn Anthony. On 23 January 2025, it was released theatrically.

== Plot ==
Dominic is a former police officer now working as a private detective in Kochi with his assistant, Vignesh. Once respected for his investigative skill, Dominic now handles minor cases and struggles to stay afloat. One day, the building owner finds a woman's purse abandoned at the hospital. She offers to waive Dominic's overdue rent and other expenses if he can return the purse to its owner. Motivated purely by money, Dominic agrees. While examining the contents to identify the owner, he discovers the purse belongs to Pooja Raveendran, a young woman officially reported missing.

Dominic begins retracing Pooja's recent movements to locate her. Phone records, CCTV footage, travel slips and witness statements reveal signs that Pooja may have been under surveillance. Her family mentions a suspected stalker and asks Dominic to identify who was following her. During this process, Dominic learns about Pooja's ex-boyfriend, Karthik. Further inquiry reveals that Karthik himself has been missing for two years, a fact that was quietly ignored after his motorcycle was found near a lake with no body recovered. To better understand Karthik's past, Dominic travels to his hometown in Idukki where he meets Nanditha, Karthik's sister and a classical dancer. Dominic is intrigued by her calm demeanor. When a local gangster harasses Nanditha, Dominic intervenes and protects her, unaware that the man has deeper ties to her life. As Dominic continues investigating Pooja's disappearance, he uncovers more about Karthik's personal life. Karthik was loved by many, and was last seen on New Year's.

Dominic also learns that Karthik worked with an NGO led by a respected public figure whose private actions were questionable. On the day Karthik vanished two years earlier, he witnessed his NGO boss meeting a corrupt businessman. When Karthik was spotted, he fled. His motorcycle was later found near a lake, and he was presumed dead, though no body was ever recovered. With the help from an old friend on the police force, Dominic organizes a renewed search of the lake. The team recovers a motorcycle and a body weighted down with stones. It is initially assumed to be Karthik but a corpse is found which was revealed to be Pooja's.

Seeking clarity, Dominic asks Pooja's mother to send a video Pooja recorded shortly before she went missing. The video features a dance routine performed by Nanditha. Dominic visits Nanditha's house again. She welcomes him warmly and offers him payasam. While Dominic questions her, the audience is shown the body of the gangster who had harassed her hidden in a freezer—poisoned and concealed. It was also revealed that Nanditha had poisoned Dominic's payasam but he didn't drink it. Despite intense questioning, Nanditha's story remains consistent. Nanditha accidentally references January 10—a date Dominic never mentioned. Confronted with the inconsistency, Nanditha drops the façade. The breakthrough comes when Dominic receives a call from Karthik's former drama troupe leader and their uncle. He reveals that Karthik was an exceptional actor who frequently performed female roles and Nanditha had already died at the age of fifteen and Karthik didn't even come to see her for the last time or do the last rites.

Dominic reviews the old troupe photographs and notices the striking resemblance between Karthik and Nanditha. He realizes Karthik never died two years ago. He staged his disappearance and has been living as Nanditha. During a final interrogation, she admits to killing Pooja along after she repeatedly called her “Karthik,” refusing to accept his identity as Nanditha. She disposes her body with gangster's help. When he says that their uncle told him everything, she attacks Dominic and says that she killed her father. In a violent struggle that follows, Nanditha nearly kills Dominic by stabbing him in his stomach but he is saved by Vignesh. Nanditha escapes with the help of the housekeeper. In the aftermath, Dominic uploads the case to YouTube. The story goes viral, restoring his reputation and transforming his failing detective practice. The film ends with Dominic spotting Nanditha in Andaman Islands. He sends her the YouTube video link. As she watches, Dominic slowly approaches her on the beach, leaving their final encounter and getting her arrested for Pooja's murder.

== Cast ==
- Mammootty as Charles Inashu Dominic (CI Dominic), a former police officer and private detective
- Gokul Suresh as Vignesh (Vicky), Dominic's assistant
- Sushmitha Bhat as Nanditha (Karthik)
  - Sudev Babu as Karthik
- Viji Venkatesh as Madhuri, Dominic's house owner
- Meenakshi Unnikrishnan as Pooja Raveendran, Karthik's love interest
- Vineeth as Adv. Prakash Menon
- Vijay Babu as Tony Joseph
- Shine Tom Chacko as Alby
- Balachandran Chullikkad as Swamy, Dominic's friend and cyber cell wing officer
- Wafa Khatheeja Rahman as Jancy, Pooja's friend
- Arjun Nandhakumar as Palarivattom Police Station SI Arun Kumar
- Dinesh Prabhakar as John
- Neeraja Rajendran as Alby's mother
- Veena Nair as Pooja's mother
- P. R. Rajasekharan as Crime Branch SP Junais Ibrahim IPS, Dominic's friend
- Raghunath Paleri as Francis, Karthik's neighbour
- Yassar as Idukki SP Anson Roy IPS
- Harshitha J.Pisharody as Adv. Devika, Adv. Prakash assistant
- Sudha Sumithran as Nanditha's neighbour
- Jayakumar Janakiraman as Chandrashekhar, Nanditha's and Karthik's uncle (cameo appearance)
- Laya Simpson as Reetha, Soman Pillai's girlfriend (cameo appearance)
- Lena as Lakshmi, Dominic's ex-wife (cameo appearance)
- Ashvin Mathew as Sudhir, Lekshmi's second husband (cameo appearance)
- Siddique as Soman Pillai (cameo appearance)
- Suresh Krishna as Sanjay (cameo appearance)
- Anthony as a shop owner in Nagercoil (cameo appearance)
- Gautham Vasudev Menon as Ibrahim Mooppan (cameo appearance)

== Production ==
=== Development ===
A few weeks before Turbo's release in 2024, it was reported that Mammootty and Gautham Vasudev Menon would come together for their next film's. Nayanthara, who lastly paired opposite Mammootty in Puthiya Niyamam, was reported to pair up with the actor again. The project would mark as Gautham's directorial debut in Malayalam cinema. The production was set to begin that June 2024 in Chennai; however, the team instead finalised in Kochi. Touted to be an action thriller, production was pushed to July 2024. The project would be funded by Mammootty Kampany, in their sixth production following Rorshach, Nanpakal Neerathu Mayakkam, Kaathal The Core, Kannur Squad and Turbo. The makers made announcement on 10 July 2024, confirming the project, under the tentative title Production No: VI.

The film also marks as the second collaboration between Mammootty with Gautham after they had previously acted together in Bazooka. A muhurat puja was held the same day in Kochi with the cast and crew. Darbuka Siva would score the music, while Vishnu Dev and Lewellyn Anthony would handle the cinematography and editing. Sound designer Tapas Nayak and designer Aesthetic Kunjamma are also a part of the crew alongside them. Although Nayanthara was confirmed to not be a part of the cast, Gokul Suresh, Lena, Siddique, Vijay Babu and Viji Venkatesh were announced to be part of the cast. In May 2024, the film's screenplay was reported to written by Gautham, Martin Prakkat, Naveen Bhaskar and Neeraj–Sooraj; the writers of ABCD: American-Born Confused Desi (2013), while the story would be written by Neeraj–Sooraj. The reports were confirmed during their presence in the muhurat puja.

According to Gautam, the story was pitched to him by writers Neeraj and Sooraj, whom he met through Manju Warrier. Gautam approached Mammootty, decided not to tell the idea but rather the full script. However Mammootty asked him to tell the idea. Knowing it was an investigation genre, Mammootty said he had done too many investigation films and urged Gautam for something else. But Gautam insisted that he hear the narrative adding that if he did not like it, he would pitch another. Hearing the narration, he liked the script and thought it was different from the films he has been doing, and agreed to produce the film.

=== Filming ===
Principal photography began with the first schedule on 10 July 2024 in Kochi. In September, Mammootty and Gautham Menon finished filming in Kochi and were set to relocate to Munnar to finish the remaining scenes. The Munnar schedule would be short, ending in less than two weeks. Mammootty wrapped up his portions on September 13, 2024. As of September 21, 2024, five days of shooting remained. The film was shot in a 45-day stretch. From production to release, it was the shortest film that Gautham has worked on.

== Music ==
The music and background score is composed by Darbuka Siva, in his Malayalam debut; second with Gautham after Enai Noki Paayum Thota (2019).

Dominic and the Ladies' Purse

Soundtrack album by Darbuka Siva
- Genre: Feature film soundtrack
- Language: Malayalam
- Producer: Darbuka Siva

Darbuka Siva chronology
Tharunam (2025)	Dominic and the Ladies' Purse (2025)

No.	Title	Lyrics	Singer(s)	Length
1.	"Ee Rathri"	Vinayak Sasikumar	Vijay Yesudas, ThirumaLi, Sathyaprakash, Pavithra Chari	4:29
2.	"Margazhi"	Vinayak Sasikumar	Keerthana Vaidyanathan, Kapil Kapilan	3:16

== Release ==
=== Theatrical ===
Dominic and the Ladies' Purse was released in theatres on 23 January 2025.

=== Home media ===
Shortly after its theatrical release on 23 January 2025, several reports stated that the digital streaming rights of Dominic and the Ladies' Purse had been acquired by Amazon Prime Video, with an expected premiere in early March 2025. However, the film did not premiere on the platform as initially reported. Later coverage indicated that the OTT launch remained on hold due to ongoing pricing negotiations and the absence of an official confirmation from either the producers or Amazon Prime Video.

Throughout the year, multiple reports circulated regarding revised release dates and potential shifts to other platforms, including SonyLIV and ZEE5, though none were officially confirmed at the time.

The digital rights were eventually finalised with ZEE5. The film premiered on the platform on 19 December 2025, following delay of nearly 11 months after its theatrical release.

== Reception ==
=== Critical response ===
The film received mixed reviews from critics.

Rohit Panikker of Times Now gave 3.5/5 stars and wrote "The film is a fun and entertaining mystery thriller that has been packaged and presented differently from what we have been used to from the genre of late [...] Dominic and the Ladies' Purse definitely makes for an engaging theatrical experience both in terms of visual as well as cerebral story-telling."

Gopika I. S. of The Times of India gave 3/5 stars and wrote "Dominic and the Ladies’ Purse is more of a Mammootty one-man show, in a good way. It is a little different from your regular Gautham Vasudev Menon film but there is a style to the storytelling and there are those seemingly trivial things that add a special charm to the film. Sushmitha Bhat delivers a standout performance, seamlessly balancing expressiveness with restraint"

Janani K. of India Today gave 2.5/5 stars and wrote "Dominic and the Ladies’ Purse come together in its last act, where the film springs a surprise. While Dominic and the Ladies’ Purse had great elements that could have been fleshed out into an intriguing whodunit thriller, Gautham Menon's approach doesn't quite land well."

Anandu Suresh of The Indian Express gave a negative review of the film rating it 1.5/5 stars and wrote "From the very beginning, Dominic and the Ladies’ Purse consistently evokes a feeling in us; and that's frustration. It's not that the GVM film is outright terrible, but the sheer carelessness in its execution is so palpable that the movie ultimately feels like a series of wasted opportunities."

S. R. Praveen of The Hindu wrote "Dominic's quest for the purse's owner and the way it slowly builds into a wider investigation with bigger stakes is quite an intriguing narrative, but the way it is approached on screen almost spoils it."

Latha Srinivasan of Hindustan Times wrote "An investigative thriller should be gripping and keep you engaged at every turn, and this was amiss in this flick. Having said that, there are sparks of brilliance throughout the film, and the final twist was good but perhaps a tad too late to redeem its flaws."
