= Mookuthi Amman =

2020 film by RJ Balaji

- Official release poster
- Directed by: RJ Balaji; N. J. Saravanan
- Written by: RJ Balaji
- Produced by: Ishari K. Ganesh
- Starring: Nayanthara; RJ Balaji
- Cinematography: Dinesh Krishnan
- Edited by: R. K. Selva
- Music by: Girishh Gopalakrishnan
- Production company: Vels Film International
- Distributed by: Disney+ Hotstar
- Release date: 14 November 2020
- Running time: 134 minutes
- Country: India
- Language: Tamil

Mookuthi Amman (transl. Nose-ring goddess) is a 2020 Indian Tamil-language fantasy comedy film written and directed by RJ Balaji in his directorial debut. Co-directed by N. J. Saravanan and produced by Ishari K. Ganesh, the film stars Nayanthara and Balaji, with Urvashi, Smruthi Venkat, Madhu Mailankody, Abinaya, Moulee and Ajay Ghosh in supporting roles. It revolves around a news anchor collaborating with the title character, a goddess, to expose a godman's fraudulence.

Filming took place between November 2019 and February 2020. The film was photographed by Dinesh Krishnan, and edited by R. K. Selva. It was released on Disney+ Hotstar on 14 November 2020, during Diwali, after a theatrical release was cancelled due to the COVID-19 pandemic and opened to positive reviews from critics. A sequel titled Mookuthi Amman 2, with Nayanthara reprising her role, was released on 6 November 2026.

== Plot ==
Engels Ramasamy, a Nagercoil-based news anchor, lives with his single mother, paternal grandfather and three sisters. Many girls rejected Engels' marriage proposal because his family is poor and his father abandoned him. The family plans to leave for the Venkateswara Temple, Tirupati for the fourth time, only to cancel it as the youngest sister gets her first period. They soon realise that they should go to their family deity Mookuthi Amman's temple to seek good luck.

The temple is located in a hilly area called Vellimalai, 13.9 kilometres from Nagercoil. So they head there but find the temple dilapidated. The family cleans the temple, and as per the custom, they stay for the night. While they sleep, Amman appears in human form at the temple, which Engels witnesses. He soon realises that only he can see her as he is a god-chosen child. She decides to improve his family's prospects, but in return, Engels must popularise her temple. After he complies, he decides to make his family members' dreams come true with the help of Amman, and both Engels and Amman head back to Nagercoil by bus.

Bhagavathi Baba, a godman, enters the Mookuthi Amman temple and announces that he will build a town named Panchavanam, which will destroy 148 villages around the temple in Vellimalai. This angers Engels, who has been trying to expose his scams for the past six years. Amman decides to help Engels expose Baba. The next day, she makes herself visible to Engels' family members. They soon decide to take down Baba together.

Engels goes to meet Baba but sees his estranged father, now a follower of Baba. He narrates the story to his mother. Amman makes a plan, and according to the plan, Engels' mother and sisters infiltrate Baba's group posing as Baba followers and start taking videos of him behaving badly in front of the other members without him noticing. Engels gets employed at Star Vijay and does a daily show with Baba, in which people call in for solutions to their issues.

Engels slowly reveals many dark truths about Baba. Baba then challenges Engels to answer three questions at the groundbreaking ceremony of Panchavanam, and if he answers those questions, he will not launch Panchavanam. After the episode's filming, Baba learns of Engels' family's plans to stop him. Engels immediately tells the others to escape Baba's class. But during the escape, their car is depleted of fuel, and Baba's henchmen catch them. Engels calls for Amman, and she kills the henchmen using her powers, allowing the family to reach the ceremony on time.

At the ceremony, Baba claims that the extraordinary events that made the Mookuthi Amman temple famous were all staged by Engels, but in reality, the events happened miraculously without human intervention. When Engels is asked why he staged the events, Amman appears to the audience. She exposes Baba by telling everyone that there is no need for men like Baba to protect God, and everyone should pray to God out of faith and not fear, after which she dissipates into air. After her speech, Baba becomes a public enemy. The next day, Amman spots Engels and asks him for his final wish before she returns to her abode. He replies that he is grateful for what he has, and Amman vanishes.

== Cast ==
- Nayanthara as Mookuthi Amman
- RJ Balaji as Engels Ramasamy
- Urvashi as Paalthangam
- Smruthi Venkat as Deivamritham
- Madhu Mailankody as Devamritham
- Abinaya as Vendamritham
- Moulee as Engels' grandfather
- Ajay Ghosh as Bhagavathi Baba

Guest appearances

- L. R. Eswari as herself
- Mayilsamy as the deaf priest
- Indhuja Ravichandran as a potential bride for Engels
- Yashika Aannand as herself

The character Lalgudi Karuppaiah Gandhi (LKG) from LKG (2019) makes a faceless appearance in the climax, portrayed by an unidentified actor.

== Production ==
=== Development ===
After completing work on LKG (2019), RJ Balaji wanted his next film to be something like the Hindi films OMG – Oh My God! (2012) and PK (2014), "a film with a message in it but very relevant to the time we live in". He initially wanted to remake PK in Tamil but later decided against doing so since the remake rights equalled his entire budget. Keeping the theme of PK in mind, which was about "the god that created us versus the god we have created", he wrote an original story which became Mookuthi Amman. The film is Balaji's directorial debut, while N. J. Saravanan serves as co-director; it was produced by Ishari K. Ganesh under Vels Films International, photographed by Dinesh Krishnan, and edited by R. K. Selva. Stunt Silva served as the action choreographer.

=== Casting ===
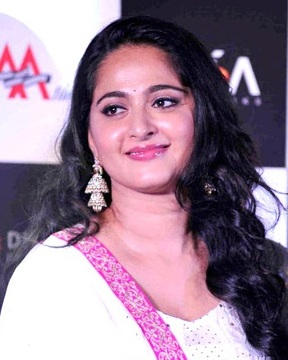
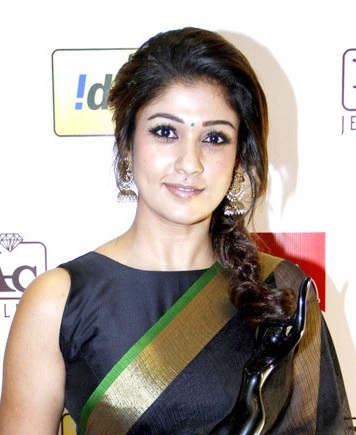
Balaji initially wanted Anushka Shetty (left) to play the title role, which was later done by Nayanthara (right).

Balaji initially wanted an established actress like Anushka Shetty or Nayanthara to portray the title character, but did not approach them. He then narrated the story to Shruti Haasan, who liked it and said she would do the role. However, when Nayanthara called Balaji and liked the story he narrated to her, she agreed and was signed on. Balaji wanted Hariharan to portray the antagonist Bhagavathi Baba, but later decided on Ajay Ghosh after watching his performance in a Telugu film and realising "he is too good as a comedian as well". Urvashi was Balaji's first choice to play his mother Paalthangam, and despite scheduling conflicts with another film, agreed to work on this film and allocated dates. Balaji cast Smruthi Venkat as Deivamirtham after being impressed with her performance in Thadam (2019). Multilingual sports presenter Madhu Mailankody, known for hosting sports events including the Cricket World Cup and the Indian Premier League, made her acting debut in Mookuthi Amman.

=== Filming ===
Principal photography began in November 2019 at Nagercoil, although Nayanthara joined the sets only in December. Filming also took place in Kanyakumari, and wrapped in February 2020. Separate scenes involving Gautham Karthik and Manobala were shot but not included in the final cut.

== Themes ==
Balaji described Mookuthi Amman as having "all the elements that were there in the devotional films that we grew up watching." He said it would be "a nostalgic trip, but there will also be a takeaway that is relevant, especially in this present times" without satirising the genre. The name of Balaji's character Engels Ramasamy is derived from two rationalists: Friedrich Engels and E. V. Ramasamy.

== Music ==
The music is composed by Girishh Gopalakrishnan, with lyrics written by Pa. Vijay. Balaji initially wanted five different composers to compose a song each for the film as he wanted each song to be different in style; however, Girishh said that Balaji had "a hard time explaining the concept of the film to others" and asked if Girishh be the film's sole composer, to which he agreed. The first single "Aadi Kuththu", sung by L. R. Eswari, was released on 2 November 2020. Another single "Bhagavathi Baba", sung by Anthony Daasan, was released on 5 November. The full album was released by Think Music on 7 November 2020. For the Telugu-dubbed version Ammoru Thalli, the lyrics were written by Rahman.

Tamil
No.	Title	Singer(s)	Length
1.	"Aadi Kuththu"	L. R. Eswari	3:07
2.	"Bhagavathi Baba"	Anthony Daasan	3:39
3.	"Aatha Solra"	Nakash Aziz	4:19
4.	"Paarthene (Amman Song)"	Jairam Balasubramaniam	4:19
5.	"Aigiri Nandini"	Aruna Sairam	2:57
6.	"Saami Kulasaami"	Deva	4:04
7.	"Chandai Alangari, Thandai Bhayangari, Andasarasari Aanavale!"	Aruna Sairam	2:57

Telugu
No.	Title	Singer(s)	Length
1.	"Ammoru Thalliki"	L. R. Eswari	3:16
2.	"Bhagavathi Baba"	Anthony Daasan	4:30
3.	"Amma Aana Raa"	Nakash Aziz	4:19
4.	"Choosanu (Ammoru Song)"	Jairam Balasubramaniam	4:19
5.	"Aigiri Nandini"	Aruna Sairam	2:56
6.	"Saami Maa Saami"	Deva	4:05

== Release ==
Mookuthi Amman was scheduled to release in theatres on 8 May 2020, but was then postponed due to the COVID-19 pandemic. In late October 2020, it was announced that the film would be having a direct-to-streaming release via Disney+ Hotstar, on the occasion of Diwali, 14 November 2020. The Telugu-dubbed version Ammoru Thalli was released on the same day, and premiered on Star Maa on 7 March 2021. The original Tamil version had its television premiere on Star Vijay on 14 April 2021.

== Critical reception ==
Baradwaj Rangan wrote for Film Companion, "If Balaji wants to write a serious film about us and God, then that's his prerogative. But this film, with its wild shifts in tone, never finds its footing". K. Janani of India Today wrote, "Mookuthi Amman is a clever and smart Amman film that is relevant in today's times and questions several important issues plaguing the country." Manoj Kumar R of The Indian Express wrote, "There is not a single dull moment in Mookuthi Amman even when things don't add up in terms of logic or continuity. And it is one of the redeeming qualities of Mookuthi Amman."

Srivatsan S. of The Hindu wrote, "Balaji operates within the limitations – both as an actor and writer – that may have worked in his favour to a certain extent in LKG and now, in Mookuthi Amman." Nandini Ramnath of Scroll.in wrote, "The humour, mostly rumbustious and occasionally sly, is superbly performed by the cast. While Balaji makes a convincing truth-seeker, Urvashi hogs the show as his garrulous and addle-brained mother. Nayanthara is perfect as the glamorous goddess with an enviable wardrobe and jewellery collection and her own special back-light, which bathes her in an irresistible glow."

== Sequel ==
A successor was announced on 13 July 2024, which was titled Mookuthi Amman 2 with Nayanthara reprising her role. The film was directed by Sundar C instead of Balaji, and is a spiritual successor rather than a direct continuation. It was released on 6 November 2026.
