= Onbathu Kuzhi Sampath =

- Film poster
- Directed by: Ja. Raghupathy
- Written by: Ja. Raghupathy
- Produced by: GK Tirunavukarasu; Ranjit Kumar Balu
- Starring: Balaji Maharaja; Nikhila Vimal
- Cinematography: R. Kolanchi Kumar
- Edited by: Dheena
- Music by: Va Charlie
- Production company: 80-20 Pictures
- Distributed by: Regal Talkies
- Release date: 15 August 2020
- Running time: 127 minutes
- Country: India
- Language: Tamil

Onbathu Kuzhi Sampath is a 2020 Indian Tamil-language romantic drama film written and directed by Ja. Raghupathy and produced by 80-20 Pictures. The film stars Balaji Maharaja, Nikhila Vimal, and Appukutty. The music was composed by Va Charlie with cinematography by R. Kolanchi Kumar and editing by Dheena.

The film is based on Onbathu Kuzhi, a village game that involves marbles. Balaji Maharaja plays a man who is an expert at the game, while Nikhila Vimal portrays a village woman. Nikhila shot for this film while shooting for Vetrivel (2016) and Kidaari (2016).

The film began production in 2016 but was delayed. It ultimately released on 15 August 2020 via Regal Talkies, a TVOD app. This is the first Tamil feature film to be telecast on a pay-per-view model.

== Plot ==
The story begins in Trichy and shows Sampath working in a quaint workshop and heading back to his village with loads of money in his hand to marry his lady love Vasanthi.

The film goes into a flashback. Sampath, a major headache to the villagers, whiles away his time playing the nine-hole marble game, drinking, and creating nuisances. His life changes when Vasanthi, who does not normally speak to anyone in the village, starts a chance conversation with him. This one reason was enough for Sampath to fall in love. This love was naturally unwelcome. To impress Vasanthi and her family, Sampath tidies himself and steps into her home to ask for her hand. Vasanthi's family is flabbergasted and blames and doubts Vasanthi for the development. To make her family believe that she is not party to his act, she decides to do what her family asks her to do. Vasanthi insults Sampath in front of the villagers during the village festival.

Sampath is taken aback. He feels insulted and locks himself within the four walls of his home. He even attempts suicide but stops at the last moment as he thinks this act of his would hurt Vasanthi more. Sampath's friend Saami is worried with this development, and not able to see his friend in this state, confronts Vasanthi. Vasanthi is now moved by this and feels sorry for her act, which saved her and her family prestige but spoiled Sampath's reputation and prestige. She speaks to Sampath and makes him come out of depression, and now both fall in love. To give Vasanthi a decent life and make her parents accept their love, Sampath decides to leave the village and move to the city to earn money. They both hide their love with themselves.

The flashback ends, and Sampath visits his home after two years. He is asked about the whereabouts of Vasanthi and is shell shocked. On the day of parting, Durai sees Sampath and Vasanthi together, and this angers him. In a fit of rage, he hits Vasanthi with a torch and accidentally kills her. On hearing the commotion, neighbors knock the door. Vislatchi opens the door and says her daughter has eloped with Sampath. She does this to safe guard the family's honor and prestige. They cremate Vasanthi's body in the backyard. This truth surfaces, and Durai gets arrested. Sampath starts living with the thoughts and memories of Vasanthi.

== Cast ==
- Balaji Maharaja as Sampath
- Nikhila Vimal as Vasanthi
- Appukutty as Saami
- Meenakshi
- Indhran
- Bhagyashree
- Lakshman Sindhamani
- Kadhal Dhandapani
- Suruli Manohar

== Soundtrack ==
The songs are composed by Va Charlie.

Song	Singer	Lyricist
"Pangali"	Velmurugan, Belliraj	Na. Muthukumar
"Ennenna Idhayathile"	Harish Raghavendra	Na. Muthukumar
"Oppari"	Belliraj	Na. Muthukumar
"Kaada Mutta"	Prasanna, Padmalatha	Karthik Nettha
"Oppari"	Belliraj	Kanmani Gunasekaran

== Release ==
The film was scheduled to release on 24 July 2020 before the release was delayed to 15 August 2020, hence coinciding with Indian Independence Day.

=== Reception ===
The Times of India gave the film a rating of 1.5/5 stars and noted that "For most parts of the film, his characters remain generic and we are hardly surprised by their actions". The Hindu Tamil Thisai praised the performances of the lead cast, but criticized the lack of romantic scenes needed for films in the romantic genre. Dinamalar gave the film a rating of 2.25/5 stars.
