= Mathagam =

- Promotional poster
- Genre: Gangster drama
- Directed by: Prasath Murugesan
- Starring: Atharvaa; K. Manikandan; Gautham Vasudev Menon; Nikhila Vimal; Dhivyadharshini; Dilnaz Irani; Ilavarasu; Vadivukkarasi
- Music by: Darbuka Siva
- Country of origin: India
- Original language: Tamil
- No. of seasons: 1
- No. of episodes: 9

Production
- Cinematography: A. M. Edwin Sakay
- Editor: Praveen Antony
- Running time: 25-30 minutes
- Production company: Screen Scene Media Entertainment

Original release
- Network: Disney+ Hotstar
- Release: 18 August 2023

Mathagam (transl. Crown) is a 2023 Indian Tamil-language gangster drama television series created and directed by Prasath Murugesan for Disney+ Hotstar. The story, which takes place in Chennai over 30 hours, follows police officers as they follow gangsters.

The principal characters of the series include Atharvaa and K. Manikandan. The nine episodic series is premiered on Disney+ Hotstar on 18 August 2023.

== Cast ==
- Atharvaa as DCP Ashwath Rathnakumar
- K. Manikandan as Padalam Sekar
- Gautham Vasudev Menon as Thirumaaran IAS, Sayanthika’s husband
- Nikhila Vimal as Vaideghi, Ashwath's wife
- Dhivyadharshini as Safi
- Dilnaz Irani as Sayanthika Biswas, Police Commissioner
- Ilavarasu as Veeravaal Nalangkilli, Minister
- Vadivukkarasi as Kasthuri
- Aruvi Thirunavukkarasu as Kabilan
- Munnar Ramesh as Sangku Ganesan
- "Blacksheep" Nandhini Mahesh as Neeralya
- Sharath Ravi as Guna
- Rishikanth as Nathan
- Murali Abbas as the Councillor
- John Sundhar as Jail Kuyil
- Scissor Manohar as Maava Seth / "Otteri" Jeyamohan
- Mai Jananee as Meenu (Sayanthika's Daughter)

== Episodes ==
Part (Note: Some publications refer to "part" as "season.")	Season	Episodes	Originally released
1	1	5 (Note: Initially planned for 8 Episode season but later released in 2 parts with 4 episodes each)	18 August 2023
2	1	4	12 October 2023

No. overall	No. in season	Title	Directed by	Written by	Original release date
1	1	"Scent of Crime"	Prasath Murugesan	Prasath Murugesan, Kalyanthuth Pandi, N.Banuchander	18 August 2023
2	2	"Ulterior Motive"	Prasath Murugesan	Prasath Murugesan, Kalyanthuth Pandi, N.Banuchander	18 August 2023
3	3	"Combat Stance"	Prasath Murugesan	Prasath Murugesan, Kalyanthuth Pandi, N.Banuchander	18 August 2023
4	4	"Band Trip"	Prasath Murugesan	Prasath Murugesan, Kalyanthuth Pandi, N.Banuchander	18 August 2023
5	5	"Battle Begins"	Prasath Murugesan	Prasath Murugesan, Kalyanthuth Pandi, N.Banuchander	18 August 2023
6	1	"The Purge"	Prasath Murugesan	Prasath Murugesan, Kalyanthuth Pandi, N.Banuchander	12 October 2023
7	2	"Red Rag"	Prasath Murugesan	Prasath Murugesan, Kalyanthuth Pandi, N.Banuchander	12 October 2023
8	3	"Battering Ram"	Prasath Murugesan	Prasath Murugesan, Kalyanthuth Pandi, N.Banuchander	19 October 2023
9	4	"First Light"	Prasath Murugesan	Prasath Murugesan, Kalyanthuth Pandi, N.Banuchander	19 October 2023

== Development ==
=== Production ===
The series is produced by Screen Scene Media Entertainment. Prasath Murugesan, of Kidaari (2016) fame, has directed the series that deals with the nexus between cops and gangsters in Chennai, marking his OTT debut. The music for the series was composed by Darbuka Siva. The cinematography was handled by A. M. Edwin Sakay, editing by Praveen Antony, stunts by Dhilip Subbarayan, and art direction by Suresh Kallery.

=== Casting ===
Atharvaa was cast as Ashwath Rathnakumar and plays a police officer. K. Manikandan was cast as gangsters. Atharvaa and K. Manikandan's marked his web series debut with this series.

== Release ==
The first teaser was released on 3 May 2023 featuring Atharvaa and K. Manikandan with Radhika Sarathkumar's voiceover says that the night is watching over everyone - the one who only sees the light and the other who only sees the day. The teaser showcases the conflict between the good and the evil. It was announced on Wednesday 5 August 2023 that the series will be released on 18 August 2023 in Tamil, Telugu, Hindi, Malayalam, Kannada, Bengali and Marathi languages on Disney+ Hotstar.
