= Smruthi Venkat =

Indian actress

- Born: Tirunelveli, India
- Occupation: Actress
- Years active: 2015–present

Smruthi Venkat is an Indian actress who appears predominantly in Tamil language films. Aside from a brief role in Indru Netru Naalai (2015), she made her acting debut with commercially success film Thadam which was released in 2019.

== Career ==
Smruthi made her career in an uncredited role in the film Indru Netru Naalai (2015). Her first significant role was in Thadam, alongside Arun Vijay. After Thadam, she acted in another Tamil film with Sathyaraj titled Theerpugal Virkapadum, which had a delayed release in 2021. After that, Smruthi was signed for a major role in Mookuthi Amman. After the success of Mookuthi Amman, Smruthi went on to play a role in Dhanush's 43rd film, Maaran directed by Karthick Naren. Apart from films, Smruthi has done some commercial advertisements such as Levista (coffee), Kalyan Jewellers, Tanishq and She also acted in Rap Rakesh Music Video titled "12 AM" Song on Woman Empowerment, Which was Released by Actor Vijay Sethupathi.

== Filmography ==
Year	Title	Role(s)	Notes	Ref.
2015	Indru Netru Naalai	Priyam TV Reporter		
2019	Thadam	Ananthi		
2020	Patra Vaitha Nerupondru	Radhika		
2020	Mookuthi Amman	Deivamritham (Deiva)		
2021	Vanam	Jasmine		
2021	Theerpugal Virkapadum	Bharathi		
2022	Maaran	Shwetha (Chittu)		
2022	Manmadha Leelai	Anu		
2022	Kuttram Kuttrame	Priya		
2022	Dejavu	Pooja		
2023	Run Baby Run	Sophie		
2024	Saamaniyan	Aparna		
2024	Hit List	Dr. Anitha		
2024	7/G	Varsha		
2025	Tharunam	Meera		
2025	Stephen	Seema		

=== Television series ===
Year	Title	Role	Platform	Notes
2022	Vadhandhi: The Fable of Velonie	Anandhi	Amazon original series	
2023	Ayali	English Teacher	Zee5	Guest Appearance

=== Music videos ===
Year	Song	Music	Notes
2016	Rap Rakesh 12AM	Rap Rakesh	Song on Woman Empowerment
2021	Ennoda Baasha	N V Arun	
