= Thedu =

2020 Tamil film

- Poster
- Directed by: Eeshwar
- Produced by: Sivakasi Murugesan
- Starring: Sanjay; Meghana; Sivakasi Murugesan; Vishnu Mayandi
- Cinematography: SabariNathan
- Edited by: wilsy
- Music by: D.J. Gopinath
- Production company: Kishore Cine Art
- Release date: 3 January 2020
- Running time: 99 minutes
- Country: India
- Language: Tamil

Thedu (/θeɪdu/ transl. Search) is a 2020 Indian Tamil-language film directed by Eeshwar. It stars Santhosh Sanjay, Meghana, and Sivakasi Murugesan.

== Cast ==
- Santhosh Sanjay
- Meghna
- Sivakasi Murugesan
- Kamaraj
- Rani

== Production ==
This is the second film of director Eeshwar after Inaya Thalaimurai (2016). Sanjay, who performed negative roles, debuted as a hero in this film. Meghana, who was last seen in Uruthikol (2017), plays his love interest. Sivakasi Murugesan became a producer with this film and also plays the antagonist.

== Reception ==
The Times of India gave the film one out of five stars and wrote that "One wonders why films like Thedu are made as it doesn't have a single aspect which is worth holding the attention of viewers". A reviewer from Maalai Malar gave the film a negative review.
