= Lingaa loss issues =

2014 Tamil film distributor losses

The 2014 Indian Tamil language film Lingaa, despite being one of the highest-grossing Tamil films of the year, was considered a box-office bomb due to the high production and distribution costs involved. The distributors faced huge losses and asked for their money back, with few of them submitted petitions to go on a hunger strike to protest against the losses incurred. Many of them claimed that the film had incurred only 30 percent of the down payment after 25 days of its release. Rajinikanth, the film's lead actor, later refunded one-third of the ₹33 crore (US$3.4 million) loss reportedly incurred by distributors and exhibitors. He decided to pay them ₹10 crore (US$1.0 million) 'on a humanitarian basis', who demanded a full refund and had threatened a "begging protest" in front of the actor's residence.

== Overview ==
According to R. Singaravelan, who acquired the distribution rights of the film in Trichy and Thanjavur areas stated about the film's losses in an online interview on 19 December 2014. He added that the film failed to collect 20% of their investments during the first week of its release, further citing that the excessive hype for the film led to higher prices for distribution rights. He also condemned the makers' decision to release the film on actor Rajinikanth's birthday (12 December 2014), due to the ongoing half-yearly examinations in schools. Few industry sources revealed that Rajinikanth's compulsion to do Lingaa is because of the failure of Kochadaiiyaan, which resulted in a police case filed against his wife Latha Rajinikanth accusing for financial fraud. Vijayabhargavi Entertainers stated that they suffered losses in Chengalpet region. Capricorn Pictures incurred losses in North Arcot, and South Arcot (Cuddalore-Villupuram) circles. Sukra Films and Chandrakala Movies lost money in Coimbatore and Tirunelveli-Tuticorin respectively. The distributors claimed Lingaa recovered only 30 percent of the down payment after 25 days of its release.

== Distributor's protests ==
On 3 January 2015, Singaravelan released an audio note citing that all the distributors will go on a hunger strike in order to protest against the losses they incurred. They submitted a petition in the Madras High Court to seek permission to go on fast at Valluvar Kottam, as they initially demanded to fast in front of Rajinikanth's residence in Poes Garden which was denied due to security reasons. The protest saw the likes of political activists with Seeman of Naam Tamilar Katchi supported the distributors.

While the move saw various reactions from politicians and members of the film fraternity, Rockline Venkatesh, the film producer insisted Singaravelan and other distributors not to malign Rajinikanth's image, whereas T Siva of Vendhar Movies who purchased the film's Tamil Nadu theatrical rights stated that "Many distributors faced losses due to the poor performance of the film, but it is not right to talk about the losses while the film is still running in theatres. When it is completely out of theatres by Pongal, we will sit together with all parties concerned, including Rajinikanth, and find a solution". The distributors then planned for an indefinite hunger strike starting from 27 January, but was later withdrawn after the producers assured the parties that the losses should be compensated.

After a discussion with film exhibitor Tiruppur Subramanian, Venkatesh on 12 February announced that he agreed to settle only 10 percent of the losses which the distributors declined and later asked for a full refund. On 17 February 2015, distributor Singaravelan had announced a 'mass begging protest' in front of Rajinikanth's residence.

=== Reactions ===
Following the distributors protests, on 18 February, the Tamil Film Producers Council (TFPC) condemned their decision as well as holding Rajinikanth accountable for the film's losses. They also claimed that it is "unethical to harass Rajinikanth, and the producer Venkatesh" and stated that "the issue should be resolved amicably". Rajinikanth's fans also planned to stage counter protests against the distributors in response to the begging protest staged by distributors.

== Compensation ==
On 21 March 2015, Rajinikanth announced that he agreed to pay one-third of the ₹33 crore (US$3.4 million) loss incurred by film distributors. Rajinikanth along with Rockline Venkatesh had decided to pay an amount of ₹5 crore (US$520,000) each to the distributors, and a press-release from TFPC said that an amount of ₹12.5 crore (US$1.3 million) has been handed over to the council, which was later disbursed to the distributors and theatre owners. Confirming the news, President Kalaipuli S. Thanu of TFPC stated that the "matter has been resolved and the distributors called off their protests".

Although distributors received only ₹6 crore of the ₹12.5 crore compensation, with Rockline Venkatesh paid ₹4.5 crore to the distributors, Tiruppur Subramanian volunteered to contribute the remaining ₹1.5 crore payable to distributors and theatre owners.

== Aftermath ==
The controversies surrounding over Lingaa loss had severely impacted other Tamil films. On 27 August 2015, the Tamil Nadu Theatre Owners Association announced the stalling of the release of Paayum Puli (2015), citing Vendhar Movies' inability to compensate the losses incurred by the distributors from North and South Arcot, Chengalpet and Trichy due to Lingaa. They stated that only half of the promised settlement had been reached in aggregate. The Producer's Council later filed a complaint to the city commissioner against distributor Singaravelan and other theatre owners who stalled the film's release, alleging that Singaravelan had been paid the compensation amount, and that he had made this announcement at the last minute to acquire more money from Vendhar Movies. The Council further announced that it would halt the release of any new film across all languages in Tamil Nadu until the issue is resolved. Later, actor Vishal and Madhan of Escape Artists Motion Pictures held a meeting with the distributors in Chengalpet area, who withdrew the red card after a financial settlement, although the screening was delayed due to lateness in the settlement. Similarly, K. S. Ravikumar's Kannada film Kotigobba 2, which was made in Tamil as Mudinja Ivana Pudi had to face financial tussles before the release due to Lingaa loss issue.
