= Mudhal Nee Mudivum Nee =

2022 Tamil film directed by Darbuka Siva

- Official release poster
- Directed by: Darbuka Siva
- Written by: Darbuka Siva
- Produced by: Sameer Bharat Ram
- Starring: Kishen Das; Meetha Raghunath; Harish Kumar; Varun Rajan
- Cinematography: Sujith Sarang
- Edited by: Sreejith Sarang
- Music by: Darbuka Siva
- Production company: Super Talkies
- Distributed by: ZEE5
- Release date: 21 January 2022
- Country: India
- Language: Tamil

Mudhal Nee Mudivum Nee (transl. You are the beginning as well as the end) also known by the initialism MNMN, is a 2022 Indian Tamil-language coming-of-age film written and directed by Darbuka Siva, in his directorial debut, who also music composed for the film. Produced by Sameer Bharat Ram, the film features a predominantly new cast and crew, including Kishen Das (in his lead debut) and Meetha Raghunath. It was released on 21 January 2022 on ZEE5, and received a positive response upon release.

== Plot ==
The film premieres sometime in the '90s and shows a group of adolescent boys from a Catholic school all set to begin their 11th year. The bunch of friends (Vinoth, Surender/Su, Chinese, Naushad, Richard, Durai, Francis and a few others), all studying in Commerce stream, check the list of new admissions for any new girls on the day of collecting their school books. They are met by two girls (Rekha and Anu) from the same school and upon leaving Rekha looks over and waves at Vinoth. It is shown that Vinoth and Rekha have been in a relationship for the past three years and only a few of their friends know about it. One of their common interest and favourite dating activity is listening to A. R. Rahman songs in a walkman. Vinoth aspires to become a music director and Rekha is supportive of his goal, so much so, that she even gifts him a guitar for his birthday

On that same day, a girl named Victoria/Vicky joins the Commerce stream as a new admission and takes an instant liking to Vinoth. Whilst all of Vinoth's friends suspect her of being interested in Vinoth, he rejects the idea of it. While Rekha's best friend Anu is in the Commerce stream with the boys, Rekha is in the Science stream, away from the boys. Rekha often shares her feeling of having less time to spend with Vinoth now that they are in different classes. After school reopens, more students are introduced - notably, Catherine, Richard, and Francis among others; Catherine is egoistic and detests and mocks Chinese who is interested in her. Richard, though part of the friendship group, is domineering and problematically precocious. Lastly, Francis is often bullied by Richard due to his lack of 'manliness'.

Initially jealous and possessive, Rekha grows suspicious about the friendship between Vicky and Vinoth, despite Vinoth's denial and fidelity. After an incident where Rekha becomes upset at seeing Vinoth and Vicky playing basketball together, Vinoth begins to maintain distance with Vicky. On their farewell day at the end of their 12th year, Rekha learns about the relationship between Anu and Chinese and excitedly rushes to tell this news to Vinoth. At this time, Vicky requests the help of Vinoth to remove a box from a tall shelf in a secluded room. As he was lifting, a speck of dust seems to fall into the eyes of Vicky and when he tries to blow it out, Vicky kisses him on the cheek. However, Rekha witnesses the kiss and immediately rushes away from there. Both Vinoth and Rekha decide to end their relationship after an intense argument where Vinoth was unable to convince Rekha. As Vinoth goes to sleep that day, Cupid arrives and advises Vinoth to beg mercy from Rekha and patch up. Vinoth adamantly refuses and claims that he is better off without Rekha in his life and that he will not regret his decision. At the same time, a silently crying Catherine leaves earlier from the farewell event, after being almost sexually abused by a food vendor at the event. Similarly, Francis and Richard are chastised by the teachers after the teachers catch the boys drinking, although Francis was bullied by Richard into drinking.

The scene cuts to Vinoth's future in the present day, where he is shown to be a successful and famous music director, yet unmarried and void of bliss in life. At this time Chinese arrives at his house and they leave for their school reunion. Chinese is a contractor and married, but unhappy with his marriage, which he doesn't show to others. They meet up with Richard, who is happily married with two kids, yet he suffers from alcoholism.Durai, Another friend of theirs is burdened with loans as he had to marry his three sisters with hefty dowries on his own. Surendar arrives at the reunion on a sports motorbike, flaunting his bachelor's life and its freedom. Naushad, a physician, arrives with his newly married conservative wife. Anu arrives with her husband, who is overly talkative, naive, and a credulous man. Catherine gives out backhanded compliments which are hiddenly insulting. Rekha arrives with her fiancé Sid, who is uninterested in the reunion and finds it lacking class and taste to his liking, and decides to leave midway. Another friend, Joseph, who used to be Vinoth's competition in music arrives and greets Vinoth and asks for keyboard player opportunities in his upcoming projects as he is struggling. Finally, Francis, now confident and comfortable in his own skin, arrives with his partner, and seeing his partner, an overly drunk Richard shouts for him to leave. Richard's wife Sharon drives sense into Richard who later apologises to Francis for his behaviour and admits that it has been hard for him to see Francis in this light after growing up together with him having a different image of Francis in his mind.

Chinese sees how Catherine has been rudely behaving and decides to teach her a lesson by surreptitiously following her to her home with the aid of Surendar. He spraypaints her parked car, however, Catherine comes out of her home and discovers both of them hiding behind a wall. A child follows her out and calls her mum and this shocks both Chinese and Surendar. Catherine admits that she is no longer the same girl that they knew in school and that her behaviour at the reunion was done knowingly because she wanted to recreate her past self for a few hours of satisfaction and even the car parked outside is a rental car for a day. She tells them how she is now a single mother and an unmarried woman after her affair with a married professor. Hearing her story, Chinese reveals that he is waiting for his divorce finalisation after his wife cheated on him with someone else in their office. Surendar too admits that he is still trying to make ends meet as a mechanic and the bike he rode was borrowed for a day from a workshop near his. In the end, they all end up spending the night at Catherine's, cooking, eating, and laughing.

On the other hand in the reunion, Vinoth is asked to perform a song and he reluctantly grabs a guitar and sings a song which he states as the first song he had written. Throughout the song, he exchanges gaze with Rekha who is emotional at knowing that this song is written for her. She asks him if she could listen to any songs from his upcoming movies. Vinoth agrees and they both walk out of the reunion together as Vinoth had his earphones in his car. They share an earpiece of the earphones listening to the songs. Rekha asks Vinoth to play A.R.Rahman's songs which they listened to during their school time. Sid calls Rekha and informed her that he had come to pick her up. As Rekha was about to leave, Vinoth admits that he has missed her.An emotional Rekha takes Vinoth by surprise by planting a passionate kiss on his lips and leaves without looking back. The kiss crumbles Vinoth to the ground and he regrets his past decision to end his relationship with Rekha. Chinese finds him and consoles him while Cupid arrives at this scene with the past Vinoth from the 90s in the background, seemingly showing him the eventuation of his decision. Seeing this, Vinoth begs for another chance and Cupid grants him that chance to return to the 90s. Waking back up in his room after the argument with Rekha on their farewell day, Vinoth runs to Rekha's house and apologises to her and they both reconcile.

The scene cuts to the future in the present day, where Vinoth is happily married to Rekha, who is an architect and has a child. Although he isn't a music director anymore and works a normal office job, he is happy just to have Rekha in his life. Chinese is married to Anu and directs sitcoms. Richard is married too, but this time his wife is an alcoholic, whom he has to take care of. Catherine is a successful children's author. Naushad is married to a different woman and is happy. Francis is a famous YouTuber. Surendar works in a call center and is engaged to a Nepalese lady. Joseph is now a successful music director. All of the friends are successful and happy with where their lives are. In this version of their lives, the friends are on good terms with Vicky too, who joins their reunion virtually as she now lives abroad. The movie ends with an appearance of Cupid - who Vinoth doesn't remember, though he realises to have met him somewhere - and Cupid saying how he has met up with each of the characters somewhere in their lives to direct them to make the right decisions in their love life, but none remembers him.

== Cast ==
- Kishen Das as Vinoth
- Meetha Raghunath as Rekha
- Harish Kumar as Chinese
- Goutham CSV as Surendar "Su"
- Varun Rajan as Richard
- Sacchin Nachiappan as Srivastav aka DJ Vatts
- Purva Raghunath as Catherine
- Amritha Mandarine as Anu
- Saraswati Menon as Sharon
- Rahul Kannan as Francis
- Sharan Kumar as Durai
- Harini Ramesh Krishnan as Victoria alias Vicky
- Manjunath Nagarajan as Naushad
- Naren Vijay as Thirumaal aka Thiruttuguddu
- Anandh as Anand Anna
- Dr.Pavithrah Marimuthu as Priya Miss
- Darbuka Siva as Cupid (special appearance)
- Mirchi Shivshankari as Juliet Miss
- Thara as Gayathri
- J Subramanian as PT master
- Siddharth as KK
- Janaki Suresh as Kasthuri, Vinoth's mother
- Sushmita as Rekha's mother
- Gunavathy as Su's mother
- V. Sudhakar as Lakshmi Videos Owner
- Janavi as Nisa
- Aslam as Bombay
- Romal Fernando as third man

== Production ==
=== Development ===
"I had this idea in my head and started writing it down. I didn’t even write it as a movie script as such. It was only later that I turned it into a proper film script. It was a very organic process".

— Darbuka Siva, in an interview with The Times of India

In April 2018, music composer Darbuka Siva announced his debut as a director, with the project being produced by Sameer Bharat Ram of Super Talkies. Stating about his directorial debut with his original script, Siva stated that he had working experience because he has worked extensively with budding directors, also adding that he will simultaneously continue to compose music for other films. Sameer described it as "coming-of-age film featuring a bunch of new talent," adding that a casting call for the film had been put out on social media.

=== Filming ===
The makers officially announced the film with a tentative title MNMN in May 2019, with a principal launch also held the same day. In August 2019, the makers had completed the first schedule of shooting, which was held predominantly in and around Chennai. Principal photography wrapped in November 2019. On 4 November 2019, a day after the film's shooting got completed, Darbuka Siva announced the major technicians of the film's crew members; with himself composing the music, he also brought the key technicians of the film, which included Sujith Sarang, Sreejith Sarang, Thamarai as the cinematographer, editor and lyricist along with other crew members, and on 8 November, the makers officially announced the film's title as Mudhal Nee Mudivum Nee, derived from a lyric from his composition "Maruvaarthai" from Enai Noki Paayum Thota (2019).

== Soundtrack ==
The music was composed by Darbuka Siva. "Pudhidhaai" is singer Jonita Gandhi's second collaboration with Siva after "Thirudathe Thirudathe" from Enai Noki Paayum Thota (2019). On recording, she told The Hindu, "I was given the vibe that it needs to be a little retro and happy. It is almost like candypop (genre) in India; almost making one feel youthful. Especially towards the end of the song, he wanted a lot of the parts to sound 'freeing'." In an interview with The Times of India, Gandhi said, "The song was nostalgic, not just lyrically, but also reminds us to relive the memories, especially during the pandemic. Because all we are doing during this time is live off memories". The song was released as a single on 21 January 2021, coinciding with a promotional curtain raiser event featuring prominent stand-up comedians and YouTubers. The soundtrack album which was unveiled on 31 March 2021, featured six tracks including all the tracks which were released as singles earlier, it also had a reprised version of the title track performed by Shweta Subram.

Track listing
No.	Title	Lyrics	Singer(s)	Length
1.	"Mudhal Nee Mudivum Nee"	Thamarai	Sid Sriram	5:32
2.	"Kaatrilae"	Kaber Vasuki	Nakul Abhyankar	5:11
3.	"Pudhidhaai"	Keerthi	Jonita Gandhi	4:59
4.	"Neel Koadugal"	Keerthi	Bombay Jayashri, Dima El Sayed	5:17
5.	"Nedunaal"	Keerthi	Sreekanth Hariharan	4:30
6.	"Mudhal Nee Mudivum Nee" (Reprise)	Thamarai	Shweta Subram	4:45
Total length:				28:39

== Marketing ==
Darbuka Siva announced a unique promotional campaign to introduce the lead characters of the film through social media platforms. Starting from the occasion of Children's Day (14 November 2019), twelve lead characters and their names were announced by the film's team.

== Release and reception ==
Mudhal Nee Mudivum Nee was released on 21 January 2022 on ZEE5. Logesh Balachandran of The Times of India wrote, "Over the years, we have witnessed several campus flicks in different languages across the country. But only a few have actually created an impact and kindled a sense of nostalgia. Darbuka Siva's Mudhal Nee Mudivum Nee is one such film [...] Overall, the film is definitely worth-watching and would be loved by the generation who miss their school days". Baradwaj Rangan wrote, "Mudhal Nee Mudivum Nee does not have the feel and the texture of Darbuka Siva's music albums. As a director, he settles for something easier, more convenient and something more comfortable. But because we grow to like these characters quite a bit, all of them, the film isn't a bad watch either".

== Accolades ==
At the New York Movie Awards, Mudhal Nee Mudivum Nee won in the "Honourable Mention" category. Siva won in the "Best Director" category at the Art Film Awards, Macedonia.
