= Nikhila Vimal =

Indian actress

- Born: Taliparamba, Kerala, India
- Education: Kannur University
- Occupations: Actress; classical dancer
- Years active: 2009 (child artist); 2015–present

Nikhila Vimal is an Indian actress who works primarily in Malayalam and Tamil films, in addition to Telugu films. After appearing in a minor role as child artist in Bhagyadevatha (2009), she made her debut as a leading actress in Love 24x7 (2015).

== Early life ==
Nikhila Vimal was born in Taliparamba, Kannur district, Kerala to M. R. Pavithran and Kalamandalam Vimaladevi. Her father was retired from statistical department while her mother is a dancer. Her elder sister Akhila is a research scholar in Theater Arts at Jawaharlal Nehru University, Delhi.

Nikhila learned Bharathanatyam, Kuchipudi, Kerala Natanam and Monoact and made her presence at youth festivals. She graduated with a B.Sc. in Botany in 2016 from Sir Syed College, Taliparamba.

== Career ==
Nikhila Vimal acted in a documentary series, Saint Alphonsa that aired on Shalom TV. Nikhila made her debut as a child artist while in her class 8th, with Sathyan Anthikkad’s Bhagyadevatha (2009), playing the sister of Jayaram. Her major role came in Love 24x7 (2015), in which she was paired with Dileep, played the role of Kabini, a trainee reporter, directed by Sreebala K Menon who happened to be an associate director in Bhagyadevatha.

She shot her first Tamil film with Panjumittai opposite Ma Ka Pa Anand, but it was released two years later. Her second Tamil film Onbathu Kuzhi Sampath, had its release a few years later. Her first theatrically released Tamil film was Vetrivel (2016). She was among the three heroines of the film, played Latha opposite M.Sasikumar. Though her role was a small one, she made an impression with her performance in the film and was later signed to play the lead in M.Sasikumar 's own production Kidaari (2016). The film was well received and commercially successful and her role as Chemba was appreciated by critics. She was nominated for Best Debut Actress for Kidaari in the SIIMA Awards 2017.

Her debut Telugu film was Meda Meeda Abbayi with Allari Naresh. Her Malayalam film Aravindante Athidhikal opened to a positive reception and was commercially successful. She won the Most Popular Actress Award for Aravindante Athidhikal in the Kerala Kaumudi Flash Movies Award 2019, and also won the Best Star Pair of the Year Award for Aravindante Athidhikal in the Vanitha Film Awards 2019. Her last release of 2018 was the Sathyan Anthikad film, Njan Prakashan starring Fahadh Faasil in the lead role.

In 2019, she starred in Thambi alongside Karthi and Jyothika, becoming a commercial success.

In 2023, she played a significant role in the critically acclaimed Tamil film, Por Thozhil.

== Filmography ==
=== Films ===
Key
†	Denotes films that have not yet been released

Year	Title	Role(s)	Language(s)	Notes	Ref.
2009	Bhagyadevatha	Sali Chacko	Malayalam	Child actress	
2015	Love 24x7	Kabani (Karthika)	Malayalam	Lead Role	
2016	Vetrivel	Latha	Tamil	Tamil debut	
2016	Kidaari	Chemba	Tamil		
2017	Meda Meeda Abbayi	Sindhu	Telugu	Telugu debut	
2018	Gayatri	Gayatri	Telugu		
2018	Aravindante Athidhikal	Varada	Malayalam		
2018	Njan Prakashan	Salomi	Malayalam		
2018	Panjumittai	Ranji	Tamil		
2019	Thambi	Sanjana	Tamil		
2019	Mera Naam Shaji	Neenu Thomas	Malayalam		
2019	Oru Yamandan Premakadha	Diya Francis	Malayalam		
2020	Anjaam Pathiraa	Rebecca Louis	Malayalam	Cameo	
2020	Onbathu Kuzhi Sampath	Vasanthi	Tamil		
2021	The Priest	Jessy Cherian	Malayalam		
2021	Madhuram	Cherry	Malayalam	SonyLIV film	
2022	Bro Daddy	Nurse	Malayalam	Guest appearance, Disney+ Hotstar film	
2022	Jo & Jo	Jomol	Malayalam		
2022	Kotthu	Hizana (Hizu)	Malayalam		
2022	Ranga	Abinaya	Tamil		
2023	Por Thozhil	Veena	Tamil		
2023	Ayalvaashi	Celine	Malayalam		
2023	Journey of Love 18+	Sony	Malayalam		
2024	Guruvayoor Ambalanadayil	Parvathy	Malayalam		
2024	Nunakuzhi	Rimi	Malayalam		
2024	Vaazhai	Poongodi	Tamil		
2024	Kadha Innuvare	Uma	Malayalam		
2025	Oru Jaathi Jathakam	Sinitha	Malayalam		
2025	Get-Set Baby	Swathi	Malayalam		
2026	Pennu Case	Rohini	Malayalam		
2026	Ananthan Kaadu	Deepa	Malayalam; Tamil	Bilingual film	
2026	Dhoomakethu	Sharmila	Malayalam		
2026	Hello Kaadhal †	TBA	Tamil		

=== Dubbing ===
Year	Title	Dubbed for	Language(s)
2021	Karnan	Rajisha Vijayan	Tamil
2022	Padavettu	Aditi Balan	Malayalam

=== Television shows ===
Year	Title	Role	Channel	Notes
2016	Badai Bungalow	Guest	Asianet	Comedy Reality show
2016	St. Alphonsa- The Passion Flower	Saint Alphonsa	Shalom TV	Docu-fiction TV series
2016	Thapaswini Vishudha Euphrasia	Kalyani	Shalom TV	Telefilm
2016	Tharapachakam	Host	Flowers TV	Cookery show
2019	Comedy Stars season 2	Guest	Asianet	Comedy Reality show
2019	Badai Bungalow	Guest	Asianet	Promoting Mera Naam Shaji
2019	Comedy Nights with Suraj	Guest	Zee Keralam	Promoting Mera Naam Shaji
2022	Happy Valentine's Day	Herself	Asianet	Valentine's Day Special
2024	Start Music season 5	Herself	Star Vijay	Tamil reality show
2025	Star Singer season 10	Guest	Asianet	

=== Web series ===
Year	Title	Role	Channel	Language	Ref
2023	Mathagam	Vaidegi	Disney+ Hotstar	Tamil	
2024	Perilloor Premier League	Malavika	Disney+ Hotstar	Malayalam	
2026	Eyes	Ayisha	SonyLIV	Malayalam	
TBA	Anali †	TBA	Disney+ Hotstar	Malayalam	

== Awards and nominations ==
Year	Award	Category	Film	Result
2017	South Indian International Movie Awards	Best Debut Actress	Kidaari	Nominated
2018	Kerala Kaumudi Flash Movies Awards 2018	Most Popular Actress	Aravindante Athidhikal	Won
2019	Vanitha Film Awards	Best Star Pair (shared with Vineeth Srinivasan)	Aravindante Athidhikal	Won
2019	South Indian International Movie Awards	Best Actress	Aravindante Athidhikal	Nominated
