= Dejavu (2022 film) =

2022 Indian Tamil-language film

- Theatrical release poster
- Directed by: Arvindh Srinivasan
- Written by: Arvindh Srinivasan
- Produced by: K. Vijay Pandi; P. G. Muthiah
- Starring: Arulnithi; Madhoo; Achyuth Kumar; Smruthi Venkat
- Cinematography: P. G. Muthiah
- Edited by: Arul E Siddharth
- Music by: Ghibran
- Production companies: White Carpet Films; PG Media Works
- Distributed by: South India
- Release date: 22 July 2022
- Running time: 118 minutes
- Country: India
- Language: Tamil

Dejavu is a 2022 Indian Tamil-language mystery thriller film directed by Arvindh Srinivasan in his directoral debut and it is produced by K. Vijay Pandi and P. G. Muthiah. The film stars Arulnithi, Madhoo, Achyuth Kumar, and Smruthi Venkat. The film was released theatrically on 22 July 2022 and received mixed reviews from critics and audience, and became a box office success. The film was partially shot in Telugu as Repeat with Naveen Chandra replacing Arulnithi, which was directly released on Hotstar.

== Plot ==
Subramani, an alcoholic novelist, visits a police station claiming that fictional characters from his novels are threatening him. His complaint is dismissed as delusional. The following day, police officers arrive at his home after receiving a distress call from a kidnapped woman named Pooja, who mentioned Subramani before the call was disconnected. The officers discover that Pooja and the circumstances of her disappearance closely resemble events described in one of Subramani's unfinished stories. When police assault him during questioning, the incident is recorded and spreads across social media.

The case attracts the attention of Director General of Police Asha Pramod, who is already under pressure due to an upcoming prime ministerial visit. She is shocked to learn that the missing woman is her own daughter, Pooja. Despite Subramani's insistence that he has no involvement in the kidnapping, every development in the investigation continues to mirror what he writes. The police begin to wonder whether he possesses some form of extrasensory perception.

To assist the investigation, Asha requests the help of ACP Vikram Kumar from another state. Vikram initially suspects that Subramani is secretly receiving information through hidden means, but finds no evidence. As the investigation progresses, he learns that Pooja disappeared after leaving a party where she had argued with another guest. Meanwhile, Subramani's writing continues to predict real-world events, including details that should be impossible for him to know.

A second kidnapping described in Subramani's manuscript leads investigators to revisit an old case involving the gang rape and murder of a young woman named Janani. A year earlier, Janani had been abducted by a group of wealthy young men traveling in a BMW. The only witness was a taxi driver named Ravi. Although police initially pursued the perpetrators, one of them was the son of a powerful central minister. Faced with political pressure and the promise of promotion, Asha suppressed the truth, framed Ravi as the culprit, and arranged an encounter killing to close the case.

As the similarities between Subramani's story and the past case become clearer, Vikram uncovers the truth. Pooja is rescued from the minister's son, and the investigation reveals that the entire kidnapping was orchestrated by Rahul, Ravi's twin brother, a technology expert. Rahul, his father Subramani, and their associates recreated elements of Janani's case to expose the conspiracy that had destroyed Ravi's reputation and concealed the real criminals.

Vikram confronts Asha with the evidence. Rather than allow the truth to emerge, she orders him to eliminate everyone involved and stage the deaths as an encounter. Instead, Vikram turns against her. He kills the minister's son and publicly releases footage proving Asha's involvement in the cover-up, resulting in her dismissal and a formal inquiry.

A further revelation explains Vikram's personal involvement in the case. He is revealed to be Janani's boyfriend. After the assault, Janani had survived and was expected to recover, but Asha feared that her testimony would expose the conspiracy surrounding Ravi's death. To prevent this, Asha murdered Janani in the hospital. Vikram's investigation was therefore motivated not only by justice but also by a desire to avenge her death.

In the aftermath, Asha attempts to justify her actions to Pooja, who rejects her completely. Overwhelmed by guilt and disgrace, Asha shoots herself.

== Cast ==
- Arulnithi as ACP Vikram Kumar(Fake) / Arun(Original)
- Madhoo as DGP Asha Pramod
- Achyuth Kumar as Novelist Subramani (voice dubbed by M. S. Bhaskar)
- Smruthi Venkat as Pooja, Asha's daughter
- Maria Vincent as Janani
- Ragav Vijay as Ravi and Rahul (dual role)
- Kaali Venkat as Constable Ezhumalai
- Mime Gopi as ACP
- Chetan as Chetan, Asha's PA
- Supergood Subramani as Constable N. Divakar Bala
- Yalini Rajan as Anitha, Pooja's best friend
- Surjith Kumar as Kishore, Pooja's colleague
- Girija as Ramya, Pooja's colleague
- Joseph as Siddharth, MLA's son
- KPY Bala

== Production ==
In November 2020, the film's shooting started. Due to COVID-19, the shoot of the film was postponed and finally completed in June 2021.

== Release ==
=== Theatrical ===
The title of the film and the first look poster of the film were unveiled by director Venkat Prabhu, M. Sasikumar in his Twitter account on 21 July 2021. In January 2022, the film's teaser was released by Udhayanidhi Stalin. The movie was announced to be released on 22 July 2022.

=== Home media ===
The satellite rights of the film were sold to Colors TV.

== Reception ==
The film received mixed reactions. Logesh Balachandran of The Times of India rated the film 2.0 out of 5 stars and stated that "Arulnithi's effort to try something inventive is laudable, but Dejavu is certainly not a film you can experience more than once." Haricharan Pudipeddi of Hindustan Times after reviewing the film stated that "As far as a thriller goes, Dejavu manages to impress to a large extent and leaves hardly any room for complaints."
