= Thadam =

2019 film directed by Magizh Thirumeni

- Theatrical release poster
- Directed by: Magizh Thirumeni
- Written by: Magizh Thirumeni
- Produced by: Inder Kumar
- Starring: Arun Vijay; Tanya Hope; Smruthi Venkat; Vidya Pradeep
- Cinematography: S. Gopinath
- Edited by: N. B. Srikanth
- Music by: Arun Raj
- Production company: Redhan – The Cinema People
- Distributed by: Screen Scene Media Entertainment
- Release date: 1 March 2019
- Running time: 137 minutes
- Country: India
- Language: Tamil

Thadam (transl. Trail) is a 2019 Indian Tamil-language crime thriller film written and directed by Magizh Thirumeni. Produced by Inder Kumar, the film stars Arun Vijay in a dual role along with Vidya Pradeep, Tanya Hope and Smruthi Venkat. The music was composed by Arun Raj, with cinematography by Gopinath and editing by N. B. Srikanth. In the film, police officers try to solve a murder case involving lookalike suspects arrested on the basis of a pictorial evidence.

Thadam was released theatrically on 1 March 2019, opening to critical acclaim with praise for Arun Vijay's performance and the writing. It was commercially successful, becoming one of the highest-grossing films of the year in Tamil Nadu. The film was remade in Telugu as Red (2021) and in Hindi as Gumraah (2023).

== Plot ==
Ezhil is a civil engineer from IIT Madras, while his lookalike, Kavin, is a gambling thief who deceives people along with his sidekick, Suruli. Ezhil's love interest is an IT girl, Deepika, while a girl named Ananthi loves Kavin, unaware of his real identity. One day, Kavin tries to help Murali pay his debt by extracting money from Ananthi through lies, but she helps him despite knowing the truth. After taking the money, Kavin is enraged and so is Ezhil, after a party. That night, one of them breaks into a house and attacks the owner, Akash, stabbing him to death. The next day, Kavin frees Suruli by paying his debt and wins Ananthi's trust by returning her money and telling her the truth. However, as the investigation of Akash's murder proceeds, the police find a selfie clicked by a couple nearby with either Ezhil or Kavin in it.

Both Ezhil and Kavin are brought in and investigated without their knowledge of each other's existence. Gopalakrishnan, an inspector who shares an old rivalry with Ezhil, tortures him. Ezhil reveals his car broke down and a call taxi driver helped him, as he didn't have the repair kit. SI Malarvizhi interrogates Kavin, who cites various laws to escape torture. She reaches out to Akash's friend and shows him the photograph of Ezhil/Kavin, but he refuses to recognise him. She also questions Suruli and tells him not to leave the city without permission, but he secretly escapes. Malarvizhi then learns of the rivalry between Ezhil and Gopalakrishnan; Ezhil helped the latter's daughter elope with her lover, much against her father's wishes. The forensic expert informs Malarvizhi about a hair sample recovered from the crime scene and how it doesn't match anyone else in Akash's home.

At the police station, Ezhil tries to escape, but Kavin interrupts. The two violently fight, hurting everyone and vandalising the station in the process. Their DNA reveals Ezhil and Kavin to be identical twins who confess to the same crimes. They parted ways when their parents divorced and Kavin went with his mother, who gambled a lot and eventually committed suicide. His father takes Kavin in but gets into a violent fight with him and Ezhil, leading to their admission to a mental institution. Kavin became interested in studying law but left due to his lack of college ethics. One day, Ezhil found Kavin leaving Ezhil's home and ring for Deepika found to me missing and the police beat up Kavin. Kavin later called Ezhil and told that ring is still there at home and not taken. Ezhil realised his mistake but Kavin vowed to seek revenge.

Gopalakrishnan still wants to frame Ezhil, but the call taxi driver who helped him confirms he was stuck on the night of the murder and paid Suruli's debt with gambling money. The sessions court acquits Kavin and Ezhil to protect the innocent from punishment. Gopalakrishnan retires without regaining his revenge. Meanwhile, Malarvizhi discovers Deepika's photo in Akash's case. She inquires with his friend about the girl he was infatuated with. In a flashback, Ezhil murdered Akash for drugging, kidnapping and raping Deepika out of his childhood lust before killing her. He also bribed the police to drop the case. Kavin helps Ezhil by getting into trouble and officially arrested to throw off the police.

Later, Kavin meets Ezhil on the highway and explains how Malarvizhi can't reopen the case as she created a fake witness to help Ezhil and could herself get arrested, having done this once, which resulted in her suspension. Ezhil hands him over a photograph of them with their mother and tells him he is going to Mumbai and later to Copenhagen, never to return. Having sold all of his property in India, Ezhil gives a 50% share to Kavin as a tribute. After his marriage with Ananthi, Kavin realises his lack of trust in his mother prompted her to kill herself. He promises to do better with his wife.

In a mid-credits scene, some investigating officers appear for a documentary shooting. One of the investigating officers calls the case unprecedented before someone tells him similar cases occurred in other countries.

== Cast ==
- Arun Vijay in a dual role as
  - Ezhil
  - Kavin
- Vidya Pradeep as Sub-Inspector Malarvizhi
- Tanya Hope as Deepika, Ezhil's love interest
- Smruthi Venkat as Ananthi, an innocent woman and Kavin's one-sided lover
- Satyajit Dhananjayan as Ezhil's and Kavin's father
- Sonia Agarwal as Lakshmi, Ezhil's and Kavin's mother
- Vijayan as Inspector M. Gopalakrishnan
- Yesakkiappan as Aakash
- Yogi Babu as Suruli
- George as Police Constable Dhanasekar
- Meera Krishnan as Chechi
- Uriyadi Suruli as Forensic specialist Bakiya

== Production ==
In March 2017, Arun Vijay revealed that he would next work on a film directed by Magizh Thirumeni, which marks the second film for the duo after Thadaiyara Thaakka (2012). Magizh had originally narrated the script to actor Udhayanidhi Stalin, who was unable to take it up at the time; it was Arun Vijay who then expressed interest, eventually introducing Magizh to the film's producer, Inder Kumar. The film was launched in April 2017 at Chennai. Magizh said the film was initially planned as a black comedy, but as he wrote the script further, it became "darker, more realistic" and discarded the black comedy aspect. Arun was reported to be playing a double role, while the film would be based on a real life story. Gopinath and N. B. Srikanth were signed on to be the film's cinematographer and editor. It is the first major role for Smruthi Venkat, and the Tamil debut of Tanya Hope. The film entered production in June 2017, and wrapped in February 2018.

== Soundtrack ==
The soundtrack is composed by Arun Raj, making his debut as a music composer. The songs were released on 6 February 2019.

Track listing
No.	Title	Lyrics	Singer(s)	Length
1.	"Inayae"	Madhan Karky	Sid Sriram, Padmalatha	3:35
2.	"Thappu Thanda"	Eknath	V. M. Mahalingam, Arun Raj, Rohit Sridhar	3:40
3.	"Vidhi Nadhiyae"	Madhan Karky	L. V. Revanth	3:20
4.	"Thadam Theme"	Arun Raj	Arun Raj	2:00
5.	"Vidhi Nadhiyae" (reprise)	Madhan Karky	Arun Raj	3:28
Total length:				16:03

== Release ==
Thadam was released on 1 March 2019, delayed from 22 February.

=== Critical reception ===
Sify rated the film 3.5 out of 5 stars stating "The presentation is smart and stylish. An engaging whodunit thriller from the word go. The biggest strength is Arun Vijay and his convincing performance as Ezhil and Kavin". Thinkal Menon of The Times of India rated 3.5 out of 5 stars stating "Thadam has an intriguingly written flow of events which begins from the pre-interval point and maintains the suspense factor till the end". Srinivasa Ramanujam of The Hindu stated "Thadam by Magizh Thirumeni is an effective murder mystery involving identical twins". Writing for Film Companion, Baradwaj Rangan rated it 2.5 out of 5 stars stating "The cinematographer keeps throwing in slightly angled frames, which give the sense of a dual reality: one normal, one skewed. We think we know who did it — but do we?"

Janani K of India Today rated the film 2.5 out of 5 stars stating "Director Magizh Thirumeni's second film with Arun Vijay, Thadam, deals with a sensitive and intriguing murder mystery. But the screenplay is messed up and filled with spoonfeeding moments". S Subhakeerthana of The Indian Express rated 3 out of 5 stars stating "At first glance, Thadam, inspired by real events, comes across as a pretty straightforward urban thriller. But as the layers peel, you discover it is cleverly written—in parts". Writing for Firstpost, Sreedhar Pillai rated 3 out of 5 stars stating "Thadam is an out-and-out Arun Vijay film. A well made thriller which takes the audiences by surprise in its climax with some twists and turns". Anupama Subramanian of Deccan Chronicle rated 3.5 out of 5 stars stating "Barring couple of dull moments, Thadam is a well-written engrossing thriller worth a watch". Kavitha Muralidharan of The News Minute rated 3 out of 5 stars stating "The film has a deceptively simple storyline but the treatment makes all the difference".

=== Box office ===
Thadam grossed ₹2.3 crore (equivalent to ₹3.1 crore or US$320,000 in 2026) in its third weekend, taking its estimated cumulative gross in Tamil Nadu to ₹18.4 crore (equivalent to ₹25 crore or US$2.6 million in 2026) at the end of 20 days. Made on a budget of ₹5.4 crore (equivalent to ₹7.3 crore or US$760,000 in 2026), it grossed ₹24 crore (equivalent to ₹33 crore or US$3.4 million in 2026) as of April 2019.

== Remakes ==
Thadam was remade in Telugu as Red (2021), and in Hindi as Gumraah (2023).
