= Kidaari =

2016 Indian Tamil action-mystery film by Prasath Murugesan

- Theatrical release poster
- Directed by: Prasath Murugesan
- Written by: Prasath Murugesan
- Produced by: Sasikumar
- Starring: Sasikumar; Nikhila Vimal; Napoleon; Vela Ramamoorthy
- Cinematography: S. R. Kathir
- Edited by: Praveen Antony
- Music by: Darbuka Siva
- Production company: Company Productions
- Release date: 2 September 2016
- Running time: 131 minutes
- Country: India
- Language: Tamil

Kidaari (transl. The rough man) (Note: "Kidaari" has different meanings and interpretations in different regions of Tamil Nadu, but means a short-tempered "rough guy" in Sattur, where the story is set.) is a 2016 Indian Tamil-language mystery thriller actiom drama film written and directed by Prasath Murugesan, starring Sasikumar and Nikhila Vimal in the lead roles. The film, which is also produced by Sasikumar, features Napoleon, Vela Ramamoorthy, Suja Varunee, O. A. K. Sundar, and Hareesh Peradi in supporting roles. Darbuka Siva composed the music, while S. R. Kathir handled the cinematography and Praveen Anthony handled the editing. The film was released on 2 September 2016.

== Plot ==
In Sattur town, Kombaiah Pandian (Vela Ramamoorthy) is the local don and controls the entire town. Kidaari (Sasikumar) is Kombaiah's loyal henchman who is ready to sacrifice his life for the sake of his boss. One day, Kombaiah is stabbed in his neck by someone, and the news comes as a shock to the entire town. Now, Kidaari sets stage to find the culprit behind the assault and lists out all the suspects. The movie goes into flashback mode, frequently detailing the rivalry between Kombaiah and each suspect. Finally, Kidaari finds out that Kombaiah's brother in-law and close aide, Kombaiah's friend (Mu Ramaswamy), was responsible for the assault. Kombaiah's friend admits that Kombaiah was stabbed accidentally when he tried to safeguard himself from Kombaiah. A flashback is shown detailing the rivalry between Kombaiah and his own son Nambi (Vasumithra).

The only daughter of Kombaiah's friend was married to Kombaiah's son Nambi. Trouble erupts between Nambi and his father Kombaiah, which leads to Kombaiah killing his own son. This worries Kombaiah's friend as his daughter has become a widow because of Kombaiah. This was the reason for his anger over Kombaiah. He also discloses the truth to Kidaari about the death of his father Kottur Durai (Napoleon). Years back, Kotur Durai was a henchman to a politician named S. N. Kaalai (Hareesh Peradi), while Kombaiah was a sidekick to Kotur Durai. However, Kombaiah betrays and kills Kottur Durai and then Kaalai. He then stages a drama that Kaalai killed Kottur Durai and he had revenged by killing Kaalai, which helped him establish himself as a don in the town. Knowing this, Kidaari feels bad as Kombaiah's affection towards him was fake. He visits him in the hospital and informs him that he had understood Kombaiah's true intentions. Kombaiah is saved but loses his speech, and Kidaari becomes the don of the town. Kidaari spares Kombaiah but has instigated a fear of death in his mind, which Kidaari thinks is a bigger punishment.

== Cast ==
- Sasikumar as Kidari
- Nikhila Vimal as Chembha
- Napoleon as Kottur Durai, Kidari's Father
- Vela Ramamoorthy as Kombaiah Pandian
- O. A. K. Sundar as Pulikutthi Pandian
- Hareesh Peradi as S. N. Kaalai
- Suja Varunee as Loganayaki
- Shobha Mohan as Kombaiah's wife
- Vasumithra as Udaiya Nambi, Kombaiah's son
- Naadodigal Gopal as Pulikutthi's brother
- Mu Ramaswamy as Kombaiah's friend
- Phathmen as Kadakkarai
- Raam as Ananth Velankar
- Deepa Shankar as Ponnamma
- Thenali (Dindugal Thendral)
- K. N. Kaalai
- R. S. Sathish as S.N.Kaalai's Son
- Anthony Daasan as singer in song "Vandiyile Nellu Varum"

== Production ==
Sasikumar began work on the film directed by Prasath Murugesan during March 2016 in Chennai. Sasikumar attained the title Kidaari from P. Samuthirakani, who had previously registered the title. Filming ended in July 2016, after 62 working days.

== Soundtrack ==
Darbuka Siva composed the soundtrack. One of the songs, "Vandiyila Nellu Varum", was earlier featured in the debut album of La Pongal, a musical project founded by Siva. The audio rights were bought by Think Music. Karthik of Milliblog wrote, "Darbuka Siva's film debut extends his style of music to great effect".

Track listing
No.	Title	Lyrics	Singer(s)	Length
1.	"Vandiyile Nellu Varum"	Anthony Daasan, Ekadesi	Anthony Daasan, Sanjana Divaker Kalmanje	3:54
2.	"Vettaruva Veecharuva"	Ekadesi	D.Velmurugan	3:08
3.	"Thalakaalu Puriyalaiyae"	Mohanrajan	Anitha Karthikeya, Velmurugan	3:58
4.	"Nenjukkulla Ninnu Kittu"	Ekadesi	Sanjana Divaker Kalmanje	2:34
5.	"Pagaivanukku Arulvaai"	Bharathiyar	Haricharan	4:22
6.	"Kaathu Veesudhu Kaathu"	Mohanrajan	Darbuka Siva, Gowtham Bharadwaj	1:38
7.	"Velivarum Ulmugam" (instrumental)			2:55
Total length:				22:29

== Reception ==
Baradwaj Rangan wrote in The Hindu, "This murder mystery needed more than flavour. It needed focus." Anupama Subramanian of Deccan Chronicle wrote, "Though most of the scenes are contrived, Kidaari still is an interesting film that uses a narrator to drive the viewer and the scenes". M. Suganth of The Times of India wrote, "The film manages to be engaging enough, with Murugesan nicely introducing humour (one old character who makes empty boasts is a scene-stealer) into the violent scenes. It is only in the final denouement that the film resorts to cliché". Karthik Keramalu of News18 wrote, "Kidaari is something all the members of the film can be proud of", lauding the casting and calling the film a "fine example of a dog-eat-dog world".
