= Darbuka Siva =

Indian director, writer, musician, music producer, and actor

- Occupations: Writer, Director, Music producer and Actor
- Years active: 2015–present
- Notable work: Mudhal Nee Mudivum Nee, Enai Noki Paayum Thota, Rajathandhiram, Rocky
- Website: www.darbukasiva.com

Darbuka Siva is an Indian musician, filmmaker and actor based in Chennai, Tamil Nadu. Starting out as a drummer/percussionist, he went on to acting, writing and directing films which have won awards in film festivals in Europe and London.

== Career ==
=== Acting ===
In 2015, Darbuka Siva made his debut as an actor in the heist action-thriller Rajathandhiram, where he played the character of Austin D'Costa. Baradwaj Rangan, a film critic wrote: "Darbuka Siva, walks off with the film in his pocket. He has a great face for the movies (he may remind you of Dominique Pinon), and at a time comedy has been reduced to tired one-liners, it's a pleasure to be reminded of wit and timing."

=== Composer ===
In August 2016, Siva released his first ever full-length album as a music director for a feature film titled Kidaari. The album received rave reviews for its organic sounds and the blend of Tamil folk music with contemporary sounds.

During late 2016 Siva started working with Gautham Menon on making songs for Enai Noki Paayum Thota. The first single of the film, Maruvaarthai was released on New Year's Eve of 2016 with credits to a certain Mr.X as the music composer. The song was a hit as well as the Mr.X campaign itself.During September 2017, Gautham Menon confirmed that Darbuka Siva was the much talked about Mr.X.

== Filmography ==
=== As actor ===
Year	Title	Role	Notes
2015	Rajathandhiram	Deepan (Austin D'Costa)	
2016	Thodari	Rajapandi	
2022	Mudhal Nee Mudivum Nee	Cupid	Guest appearance

=== As director ===
Year	Film
2022	Mudhal Nee Mudivum Nee

=== As composer ===
Year	Film	Notes
2016	Kidaari	
2016	Balle Vellaiyathevaa	
2017	Nimir	
2019	Enai Noki Paayum Thota	
2021	Rocky	
2022	Mudhal Nee Mudivum Nee	
2025	Dominic and the Ladies' Purse	Malayalam film
2025	Tharunam	
2026	TN 2026	
2026	Lakshmikanthan Kolai Vazhakku	

As composer – Web Series

Year	Film	Platform
2019	Queen	Mx Originals
2023	Mathagam	Disney Hotstar
