= Vaaranam Aayiram (soundtrack) =

2008 soundtrack album by Harris Jayaraj

Soundtrack album by Harris Jayaraj
- Released: 25 September 2008
- Recorded: 2007–2008
- Genre: Feature film soundtrack
- Length: 36:59
- Language: Tamil
- Label: Sony Music India
- Producer: Harris Jayaraj

Harris Jayaraj chronology
Dhaam Dhoom (2008)	Vaaranam Aayiram (2008)	Ayan (2009)
External audio
- Official Tamil Jukebox on YouTube

Vaaranam Aayiram is the soundtrack album for the 2008 film of the same name directed by Gautham Vasudev Menon, and features music by Harris Jayaraj, following four successive soundtracks with the director. The album was under production from one-and-a-half years and featured seven songs written by Thamarai and Na. Muthukumar. The album was distributed by Sony Music India and released on 25 September 2008. The soundtrack for the Telugu dubbed version titled Surya S/o Krishnan featured lyrics by Veturi and was released on 30 October 2008.

The soundtrack album opened to positive reviews and fetched multiple accolades. Upon release, Vaaranam Aayiram became the most downloaded Tamil album and was listed among the top 20 digital downloads. It is considered to be the most played and repeated soundtracks in music streaming platforms till date, a record for a Tamil album. It was the last soundtrack from the collaboration with Jayaraj and Menon, after they parted ways post the film's release, until they worked together in Yennai Arindhaal (2015).

== Album information ==
The soundtrack album was under production from late 2007, features seven songs; six of them written by Thamarai and one song by Na. Muthukumar and an instrumental song. The track "Mundhinam Partheney" was played during Krishnan's (Suriya) meet with his first love Malini (Simran). The track was considered to be a favourite for many music critics and audiophiles. A sample of tunes and beats is inspired from the 1987 song "Faith" from the studio album of the same name by George Michael. The song "Yethi Yethi" sung by Benny Dayal, was picturised on Suriya's early life in his teenage. It was shot at the Elliot's Beach, along with the LIC headquarters in Chennai and Napier Bridge.

"Adiye Kolluthey", which was recorded by Benny Dayal and Shruti Haasan, was shot at the University of California, Berkeley, where few scenes were being filmed. This song featured in the first trailer was raved by audiences, which also led a popular distributor in North India to fetch the film rights for the highest bid. Following the anticipation, a rough cut of the song was leaked into the internet, creating uproar among the film crew. The song samples AC/DC's "Love Bomb". The song "Nenjukkul Peidhidum" is picturised with Surya's (Suriya) first meet with Meghna (Sameera Reddy) in a train, where Suriya recognizes his love at first sight. It was shot at various locations including India Gate, Mumbai Taj Hotel, Taj Mahal, Egmore Junction and Anna Nagar Tower Park and few sequences being filmed in set. The track "Oh Shanthi" was played during Surya's visit to United States in search of Meghana.

"Ava Enna", sung by Karthik and backing vocals by V. V. Prasanna, was picturised during Surya's grief over the loss of Meghana, and started drugs and alcoholism to ease his pain. "Annal Mele Panithuli" is played at Surya's first meet with Priya (Divya Spandana) after his army training and was sung by prominent Carnatic musician Sudha Raghunathan.

== Release ==
The audio was initially scheduled for release on 15 June 2008, once the film's production wrapped in May 2008. But producer Venu Ravichandran opposed the plans for the launch, due to the Dasavathaaram, one of the highly anticipated films of the year was scheduled for release on 13 June 2008, two days before the audio launch, slated. During August 2008, Harris Jayaraj started re-recording works on the film score and soundtrack. The audio rights were purchased by Sony BMG, whom Ravichandran introduced into the Tamil market with Dasavathaaram for a highest bid. Harris later handed the master copy of the soundtrack on 10 September 2008 to Sony BMG, whom fixed the audio launch date as 24 September 2008.

As a unique promotional camp, the songs from the albums were released to four leading radio stations in Chennai, with one song per station, in attempt to popularise it five days before the official launch. The move by Sony BMG was the first of its kind in Indian cinema. The audio was released in Sathyam Cinemas in Chennai, with the film's cast and crew in attendance, and a live performance from Harris Jayaraj and his musical team.

== Track listing ==
=== Tamil ===
All tracks are written by Thamarai, except where noted.

No.	Title	Singer(s)	Length
1.	"Adiye Kolluthey"	Benny Dayal, Krish, Shruti Haasan	5:14
2.	"Nenjukkul Peidhidum"	Hariharan, Devan, V. V. Prasanna	6:09
3.	"Yethi Yethi Yeththi" (Lyrics: Na. Muthukumar)	Naresh Iyer, Benny Dayal, Solar Sai	4:53
4.	"Annal Mele Panithuli"	Sudha Ragunathan	5:41
5.	"Oh Shanthi Shanthi"	S. P. Charan, Clinton Cerejo	3:03
6.	"Ava Enna"	Karthik, V. V. Prasanna	5:17
7.	"Mundhinam Parthene"	Naresh Iyer, Krish, Prashanthini	5:22
8.	"Ragasiyam"	Instrumental	1:20
Total length:			36:59

=== Telugu ===
All tracks are written by Veturi Sundararama Murthy.

No.	Title	Singer(s)	Length
1.	"Yedhane Koiyyake"	Benny Dayal, Krish, Bhargavi Pillai	5:14
2.	"Naalona Pongenu"	Harish Raghavendra, Devan, V.V. Prassanna	6:09
3.	"Yegasi Yegasi"	Naresh Iyer, Benny Dayal, Chandran	4:53
4.	"Nidhare Kala"	Sudha Ragunathan	5:41
5.	"Oh Shanthi Shanthi"	S. P. Charan, Krish	3:03
6.	"Adhey Nanne"	Karthik, V.V. Prasanna	5:17
7.	"Monna Kanipinchavu"	Naresh Iyer, Prashanthini	5:22
Total length:			35:39

== Reception ==
The album received positive reviews from music critics. A reviewer from Indiaglitz stated the album is "one of the best soundtracks from Harris Jeyaraj and Gautham Menon's collaboration", further calling it as "energetic" and "entertaining". Malathy Sundaram from Behindwoods gave a 4 out of 5 rating and praised the album calling it a "blockbuster written all over". Pavithra Srinivasan from Rediff gave a 3.5 out of 5 rating and called that "Harris Jayaraj has set out to provide quality music with a difference". Karthik Srinivasan of Milliblog called that "the soundtrack is a fantastic example of a set of mesmerizing tunes used with the right vocals and appropriate backgrounds, making a solid impact".

== Accolades ==
Award (Note: Awards, festivals and organizations are in alphabetical order.)	Date of ceremony (Note: Date is linked to the article about the awards held that year, wherever possible.)	Category	Recipient(s)	Result	Ref.
Ananda Vikatan Cinema Awards	7 January 2009	Best Music Director	Harris Jayaraj	Won	
Ananda Vikatan Cinema Awards	7 January 2009	Best Male Playback Singer	Hariharan – (for "Nenjukkul Peithidum")	Won	
Ananda Vikatan Cinema Awards	7 January 2009	Best Lyricist	Thamarai	Won	
Filmfare Awards South	31 July 2009	Best Music Director – Tamil	Harris Jayaraj	Won	
Filmfare Awards South	31 July 2009	Best Music Director – Tamil	Harris Jayaraj	Won	
Filmfare Awards South	31 July 2009	Best Lyricist – Tamil	Thamarai – (for "Nenjukkul Peithidum")	Won	
Filmfare Awards South	31 July 2009	Best Male Playback Singer – Tamil	Naresh Iyer – (for "Mundhinam Paarthene")	Won	
Filmfare Awards South	31 July 2009	Best Male Playback Singer – Tamil	Hariharan – (for "Nenjukkul Peithidum")	Nominated	
Meera Isaiaruvi Tamil Music Awards	11 July 2009	Best Music Director	Harris Jayaraj	Won	
Meera Isaiaruvi Tamil Music Awards	11 July 2009	Best Album of the Year	Harris Jayaraj	Won	
Meera Isaiaruvi Tamil Music Awards	11 July 2009	Best Lyricist	Thamarai – (for "Nenjukkul Peithidum")	Won	
Meera Isaiaruvi Tamil Music Awards	11 July 2009	Best Male Playback Singer	Hariharan – (for "Nenjukkul Peithidum")	Won	
Meera Isaiaruvi Tamil Music Awards	11 July 2009	Voice of the Year	Karthik – (for "Ava Enna")	Won	
Meera Isaiaruvi Tamil Music Awards	11 July 2009	Rising Star Singer – Female	Shruti Haasan – (for "Adiye Kolluthe")	Won	
South Scope Style Awards	25 October 2009	Most Stylish Music Director – Tamil	Harris Jayaraj	Won	
Vijay Awards	13 June 2009	Best Music Director	Harris Jayaraj	Won	
Vijay Awards	13 June 2009	Favourite Song	Harris Jayaraj – (for "Ava Enna")	Won	
Vijay Awards	13 June 2009	Best Lyricist	Thamarai – (for "Nenjukkul Peithidum")	Won	
Vijay Awards	13 June 2009	Best Male Playback Singer	Hariharan – (for "Nenjukkul Peithidum")	Won	
Vijay Awards	13 June 2009	Best Female Playback Singer	Sudha Ragunathan – (for "Annal Mele Panithuli")	Nominated	
Vijay Awards	13 June 2009	Best Choreographer	Brinda – (for "Ava Enna")	Nominated	

== Legacy ==
The song "Mundhinam Paarthene" inspired a 2010 Indian film of the same name. Similarly, the Silambarasan-starrer Achcham Yenbadhu Madamaiyada directed by Menon himself was earlier titled Sattendru Maarudhu Vaanilai, adapted from one of the verses from the song "Nenjukkul Peidhidum", but was later renamed due to copyright issues. The title of the 2022 Indian film Anel Meley Pani Thuli was derived from the song of the same name. The lyric "Sattendru Maarudhu Vaanilai" from the song "Nenjukkul Peidhidum" inspired a film of the same name.
