= Yennai Arindhaal (soundtrack) =

- Soundtrack album cover

Soundtrack album by Harris Jayaraj
- Released: 1 January 2015
- Recorded: 2014
- Genre: Feature film soundtrack
- Length: 33:57
- Language: Tamil
- Label: Sony Music India
- Producer: Harris Jayaraj

Harris Jayaraj chronology
| Nannbenda (2014) | Yennai Arindhaal (2015) | Gethu (2015) |

Singles from Yennai Arindhaal
- 1. "Adhaaru Adhaaru" Released: 11 December 2014

Yennai Arindhaal is the soundtrack album for the 2015 Indian Tamil-language action thriller film of the same name, co-written and directed by Gautham Vasudev Menon, starring Ajith Kumar, Trisha Krishnan, Anushka Shetty and Arun Vijay. The album consisted of seven songs composed by Harris Jayaraj with all the tracks being written by Thamarai, except for one song written by Vignesh Shivan.

Yennai Arindhaal marked Jayaraj's reunion with Menon, whom they had parted ways after Vaaranam Aayiram (2008). Preceded by the lead single "Adhaaru Adhaaru" which released on 11 December 2014, the album in its entirety was distributed by Sony Music India and released on the midnight of New Year's Day on 1 January 2015. The album met with positive reception from critics.

== Development ==
Yennai Arindhaal marks Jayaraj's first collaboration with Ajith; (Note: Jayaraj was initially supposed to collaborate with Ajith on Mahaa, directed by Nandha Periyasamy which was shelved after Ajith suffering an accident.) it also marked his reunion with Menon, whom he had frequently collaborated with, until both of them decided to part ways after the release of Vaaranam Aayiram (2008) due to creative differences. Jayaraj reiterated in multiple instances of a possible reunion with Menon. In April 2014, Jayaraj took to Twitter confirming his involvement in the film. He had already composed the tunes by that May, and commenced recording the songs. Thamarai who had recurrently collaborated with the composer and director's previous works had contributed lyrics for six songs in the film.

The song "Yaen Ennai" is recorded by Kharesma Ravichandran in her debut as a playback singer, sharing vocals with Sunitha Sarathy. The romantic song "Mazhai Vara Pogudhe" was recorded with Karthik in August 2014. Later that month, Harris tweeted that he was recording the third song for the film. It was completed by that September, with Harris further mentioning it as a "lullaby" number. In October, Harris recorded a dappankuthu number "Adhaaru Adhaaru" sung by Vijay Prakash and Gana Bala with lyrics written by Vignesh Shivan. Jayaraj in a 2019 interview, recalled that the title track had influences of R&B and hip hop. Chinmayi Sripada had recorded one song for the film, to which she shared gratitude for Jayaraj regarding her involvement.

== Release ==
Initially Eros Music was reported to acquire the film's music rights, but was later sold to Sony Music India. In response to the request by Ajith's fans, the makers agreed to release a single, before launching the album. The song "Adhaaru Adhaaru" was released as the lead single on the midnight of 11 December 2014. Jayaraj later signified it as not an introductory song, but a "gangster song". The track list of the album was released on 27 December. The album was released on the midnight of 31 December 2014 (New Year's Eve), while audio CDs were unveiled directly to the market on 1 January 2015 (New Year's Day).

== Track listing ==
| No. | Title | Lyrics | Artist(s) | Length |
|---|---|---|---|---|
| 1. | "Yaen Ennai" | Thamarai | Sunitha Sarathy, Kharesma Ravichandran | 4:10 |
| 2. | "Yennai Arindhaal" | Thamarai | Devan Ekambaram, Krishna Iyer, Mark Thomas, Abhishek | 5:43 |
| 3. | "Unakkenna Venum Sollu" | Thamarai | Benny Dayal, Mahathi | 5:08 |
| 4. | "Mazhai Vara Pogudhae" | Thamarai | Karthik, Emcee Jesz | 5:43 |
| 5. | "Adhaaru Adhaaru" | Vignesh Shivan | Vijay Prakash, Gaana Bala | 4:55 |
| 6. | "Maya Bazaar" | Thamarai | Krishna Iyer, Aalap Raju, Priya Subramanian, Velmurugan | 4:14 |
| 7. | "Idhayathai Yedho Ondru" | Thamarai | Chinmayi | 3:55 |
| Total length: | | | | 33:57 |

== Reception ==
Critic based at The Hindu stated that the music repeated the magic of his last collaboration with Gautham Menon, which was Vaaranam Aayiram. Writing for the same website, Sudhir Srinivasan summarized "After a brief hiatus, the director again joins hands with the composer, his longtime associate. Jayaraj's theme music is a clear winner — every time it plays (and it does a number of times), it dutifully whips up frenzy." Karthik Srinivasan of Milliblog wrote "Yennai Arindhaal is Harris’ best in a long time, thanks largely to director Gautam Menon".

Siddharth K of Sify rated the album 3.75 out of 5 stars, with a verdict: "Yennai Arindhaal is a solid album having tracks in a variety of genres like dubstep, melody, western, fusion, folk, etc. Except his attempt with "Adhaaru Adhaaru", the remaining songs work instantly and would add great value to the movie. Although the longevity of these songs is there to be tested, Harris Jayaraj-Gautham Menon's combination proves once again to be fruitful and shows how Harris can deliver when he works with his favorite director. Yennai Arindhaal is among Harris Jayaraj's better work in recent times" Vipin Nair of Music Aloud rated the album 7.5 out of 10 saying "Not the best to have come out of the Harris Jayaraj-Gautham Menon combo, but has some musical goodness in offer."

S. Saraswathi of Rediff.com summarized "Music by Harris Jayaraj [...] do the director proud". Anupama Subramanian of Deccan Chronicle wrote "Harris Jayaraj’s songs do have a sense of déjà vu of his earlier hits, nevertheless, Gautham has utilized them to take forward the narrative." Nelson K. Paul of OnManorama wrote "Songs by Harris Jayaraj feel good to the ears; thumbs up for the melodious 'Unakkenna Venum Sollu'. Top-notch background score enhances the mood of the film." Regarding the song "Unakkenna Venum Sollu", Saritha Rao Rayachoti of Scroll.in stated "The movie sees the return of the partnership of Menon, music composer Harris Jayaraj and lyricist Thamarai. Benny Dayal renders the song with the timbre and tenderness reminiscent of KJ Yesudas and Unni Menon. Mahathi’s voice underscores the constant presence of Hemanika in their lives."

== Awards and nominations ==
| Award | Date of Ceremony (Note: Date is linked to the article about the awards held that year, wherever possible.) | Category | Recipient(s) and nominee(s) | Result | Ref. |
|---|---|---|---|---|---|
| Filmfare Awards South | 18 June 2016 | Best Music Director – Tamil | Harris Jayaraj | Nominated | |
| Filmfare Awards South | 18 June 2016 | Best Lyricist – Tamil | Thamarai – ("Unakenna Venum Sollu") | Nominated | |
| Mirchi Music Awards South | 27 July 2016 | Song of the Year – Tamil | "Unakenna Venum Sollu" | Nominated | |
| Mirchi Music Awards South | 27 July 2016 | Music Composer of the Year – Tamil | Harris Jayaraj – ("Unakenna Venum Sollu") | Nominated | |
| Mirchi Music Awards South | 27 July 2016 | Lyricist of the Year – Tamil | Thamarai – ("Unakenna Venum Sollu") | Nominated | |
| South Indian International Movie Awards | 30 June–1 July 2016 | Best Music Director – Tamil | Harris Jayaraj | Nominated | |
| South Indian International Movie Awards | 30 June–1 July 2016 | Best Lyricist – Tamil | Thamarai – ("Unakenna Venum Sollu") | Nominated | |
| South Indian International Movie Awards | 30 June–1 July 2016 | Best Playback Singer Male – Tamil | Benny Dayal – ("Unakenna Vaenum Sollu") | Nominated | |
| South Indian International Movie Awards | 30 June–1 July 2016 | Best Playback Singer Female – Tamil | Chinmayi – ("Idhayathai Yedho Ondru") | Nominated | |
