= 7 Aum Arivu (soundtrack) =

2011 soundtrack album by Harris Jayaraj

Soundtrack album by Harris Jayaraj
- Released: 21 September 2011
- Recorded: 2010–2011
- Genre: Feature film soundtrack
- Length: 31:29
- Languages: Tamil; Mandarin Chinese
- Label: Sony Music
- Producer: Harris Jayaraj

Harris Jayaraj chronology
| Force (2011) | 7 Aum Arivu (2011) | Nanban (2011) |

7 Aum Arivu is the soundtrack to the 2011 film of the same name directed by A. R. Murugadoss and starred Suriya, Johnny Trí Nguyễn and Shruti Haasan. The music and original score is composed by Harris Jayaraj in his second collaboration with Murugadoss after Ghajini (2005). The film consisted of six tracks written by Pa. Vijay, Na. Muthukumar, Kabilan and Madhan Karky, the latter wrote a song in Chinese language. The soundtrack was released at the launch event held in Chennai Trade Centre on 22 September 2011, with Sony Music India distributing the album in digital and physical formats. The soundtrack to the Telugu-dubbed version 7th Sense was also released on the same date.

== Development ==
Harris Jayaraj was announced as the film's composer in May 2010, collaborating with Murugadoss for the second time after Ghajini (2005), and with Suriya for the sixth time after Kaakha Kaakha (2003), Ghajini, Vaaranam Aayiram (2008), Ayan and Aadhavan (both 2009). Murugadoss and Jayaraj went to Singapore, the following month, to compose the songs for the film. Each tracks consisted of varied genres with some of the songs which were shot in Chennai, as well as in Thailand and Hong Kong.

As Murugadoss wanted to hire Chinese lyricists to write a song in Mandarin Chinese, Karky mentioned to Jayaraj that he could write a Chinese song, as he had cleared basic levels of Chinese language when he pursued master's degree at the University of Queensland in 2003. Karky recalled that the situation Harris narrated to him—which is about a "wonder-struck Chinese girl describing a hero from India"— was interesting, and immediately penned few lines of the lyrics, which got checked by a Chinese teacher. The song was recorded by Chinese singer Hao Wang in May 2011, while Jayaraj used authentic Chinese instruments to evoke an "oriental flavour".

In July 2011, it was reported that a rough cut of a song from 7 Aum Arivu was leaked onto the internet, but the producer Udhayanidhi Stalin denied such claims. The final mix of the score was completed by August 2011.

== Release ==
In mid-2011, Sony Music India secured the film's audio rights for an undisclosed price. Initially, the film's audio launch was scheduled to be held in July 2011, coinciding the eve of Suriya's birthday. However, a representative of Sony Music denied that they did not want three audio releases happening in a fortnight, as both Mankatha and Velayudham had its music rights acquired by the label and would affect the sales of the respective albums.

The audio launch was initially set to be held on 10 September 2011 in Malaysia. However, the event was held at the Chennai Trade Centre on 22 September 2011. Jai and Anjali, lead pair of Murugadoss' production Engeyum Eppodhum, hosted the event, which saw the attendance of the film crew along with Dhanush, Karthi, Jiiva, Jayam Ravi, Vishal and Ram Charan, and a live performance of the songs by Isha Sharvani, Lakshmi Rai and several international artists. Though initial reports said that Shah Rukh Khan would appear in the launch, this did not happen. According to a representative of the label, the audio CDs were sold out hours after the music hit the stores.

== Track listing ==
Tamil
| No. | Title | Lyrics | Singer(s) | Length |
|---|---|---|---|---|
| 1. | "Oh Ringa Ringa" | Pa. Vijay | Roshan, Jerry John, Benny Dayal, Suchitra | 5:34 |
| 2. | "Mun Andhi" | Na. Muthukumar | Karthik, Megha | 6:14 |
| 3. | "Yellae Lama" | Na. Muthukumar | Vijay Prakash, Karthik, Shalini, Shruti Haasan | 5:21 |
| 4. | "Yamma Yamma" | Kabilan | S. P. Balasubrahmanyam, Shweta Mohan | 6:06 |
| 5. | "Innum Enna Thozha" | Pa. Vijay | Balram, Naresh Iyer, Suchith Suresan | 4:58 |
| 6. | "The Rise of Damo" (Mandarin Language) | Madhan Karky | Hao Wang, Sunitha Sarathy | 3:16 |
| Total length: | | | | 31:29 |

All tracks are written by Bhuvanachandra.

Telugu
| No. | Title | Singer(s) | Length |
|---|---|---|---|
| 1. | "Oh Ringa Ringa" | Benny Dayal, Suchitra | 5:36 |
| 2. | "Mutyala Dhaarani" | Karthik, Megha | 6:13 |
| 3. | "Yellae Lama" | Rita, Vijay Prakash, Shalini, Karthik | 5:22 |
| 4. | "Amma Amma" | S. P. Balasubrahmanyam, Shweta Mohan | 6:07 |
| 5. | "Endukanta Joda" | Balram, Naresh Iyer, Suchith Suresan | 4:56 |
| 6. | "The Rise of Damo" (Mandarin Language) | Hao Wang, Sunitha Sarathy | 3:14 |
| Total length: | | | 31:28 |

== Critical response ==
Pavithra Srinivasan from Rediff provided 2.5/5, mentioning that "it looks like Harris Jeyaraj has run out of steam. While Yemma Yemma and The Rise of Damo are appealing, the rest sound like he remixed some of his own older numbers, or chose to be inspired by other classics [...] 7aum Arivu's music does have its moments, but these are few and far between." In a mixed review, Vipin Nair from Music Aloud called it as a "disappointing soundtrack" and gave 6.75/10 to the album. Karthik Srinivasan of Milliblog described it as "shockingly trite". Malathi Rangarajan of The Hindu noted the songs affected the pacing of the film and was critical of the score, where "the hero and villain are engaged in a bloody combat, but the sounds in the background are akin to mewing of cats and trumpeting of elephant." A reviewer for at The New Indian Express summarized: "Harris Jayaraj’s songs come at inappropriate places and background score disappoints, too." Sify-based critic also noted "The music of Harris Jayaraj is bit of a dampener, other than the slightly hummable Mun Andhi.., the rest of songs are pedestrian and you get the feel, you have heard it somewhere."

== Awards and nominations ==
| Award | Date of ceremony (Note: Date is linked to the article about the awards held that year, wherever possible.) | Category | Recipient(s) and nominee(s) | Result | Ref. |
|---|---|---|---|---|---|
| Filmfare Awards South | 7 July 2012 | Best Music Director – Tamil | Harris Jayaraj | Nominated | |
| Filmfare Awards South | 7 July 2012 | Best Male Playback Singer – Tamil | Karthik – ("Mun Andhi") | Nominated | |
| Filmfare Awards South | 7 July 2012 | Best Lyricist – Tamil | Na. Muthukumar – ("Mun Andhi") | Nominated | |
| Mirchi Music Awards South | 4 August 2012 | Best Male Playback Singer | S. P. Balasubrahmanyam – ("Yamma Yamma") | Won | |
| Mirchi Music Awards South | 4 August 2012 | Best Lyricist | Pa. Vijay – ("Innum Enna Thozha") | Won | |
