= Thaainilam =

- Directed by: Abhilash G Devan
- Written by: Abhilash G Devan
- Produced by: Amar Ramachandran
- Starring: Amar Ramachandran; Neha Amar; Nimisha Nambiar; Bala Singh
- Cinematography: Prasantha Pranavam
- Edited by: Deejo P Vargeese
- Music by: Ouseppachan
- Production company: Neni Entertainments Pvt. Ltd.
- Release date: 9 October 2026
- Country: India
- Language: Tamil

Thaainilam is an upcoming Tamil language film, directed by Abhilash G Devan, starring Amar Ramachandran, Neha Amar and Nimisha Nambiar in lead roles. The film, though won 2 Tamil Nadu State Film Awards for 2020, it had a very delayed theatrical release, finally happened on 9 October, 2026.

== Summary ==
Thaainilam tells the story of a father and daughter escaping to Rameswaram, fleeing from an horrific civil war, seeking a peaceful life.

== Cast ==
- Amar Ramachandran
- Neha Amar
- Nimisha Nambiar
- Bala Singh
- Deepak Prabhakaran
- Gurudhakshina G Devan
- Nihal Amar

== Production ==
The trailer of the film was released on 22 September. Music composer Sharreth expressed his happiness, as his niece Varsha won the playback singer award.

=== Accolades ===
Event	Category	Recipient	Ref.
Tamil Nadu State Film Awards	Tamil Nadu State Film Award for Best Female Playback Singer	Varsha Ranjith	
Tamil Nadu State Film Awards	Best Lyricist	Thamarai	
