= Deiva Thirumagal (soundtrack) =

- Original CD cover

Soundtrack album by G. V. Prakash Kumar
- Released: 14 April 2011
- Recorded: 2010–2011
- Genre: Feature film soundtrack
- Length: 33:31
- Language: Tamil
- Label: Think Music
- Producer: G. V. Prakash Kumar

G. V. Prakash Kumar chronology
Narthagi (2011)	Deiva Thirumagal (2011)	Mayakkam Enna (2011)

Deiva Thirumagal is the soundtrack to the 2011 film of the same name directed by A. L. Vijay starring Vikram, Sara Arjun, Anushka Shetty, Amala Paul. Featuring music composed by G. V. Prakash Kumar, the soundtrack has six songs written by Na. Muthukumar and an instrumental track. The album was released by Think Music on 14 April 2011 at the Chennai Trade Centre. The soundtrack was positively received by critics, and fetched Prakash a nomination for Best Music Director – Tamil at the 59th Filmfare Awards South, which he won for Aadukalam (2011).

== Development ==
Deiva Thirumagan is Prakash's third collaboration with director Vijay for the third time after the success of Kireedam (2007) and Madrasapattinam (2010). In February 2011, Vikram had recorded the song "Pa Pa Pappa" after being insisted by Prakash; he previously sang for "O Podu" in Gemini (2002) and two songs in Kanthaswamy (2009). During May 2011, it was reported that Prakash had recorded an orchestral piece that is incorporated in the final reel of the film that runs for 18-minutes. Since that particular scene does not feature dialogues, Prakash felt it important to enhance the scene musically. He recorded the score with a 50-piece orchestra at A. R. Rahman's AM Studios in Chennai. According to Vijay, he observed that Prakash had a maturity of Ilaiyaraaja's music in his work and that the re-recording of the score took more time than the composition of the songs.

== Release ==
The film's soundtrack was launched at the Chennai Trade Centre on 14 April 2011. As an innovative strategy, the invitations for the event has been covered with whistle, balloons, fan and lollipop to attract children and the venue being resembled as a carnival. The event saw the attendance of producer Rama Narayanan, directors Vasanth, Chimbu Deven, Priyadarshan, Suseenthiran and actors Lissy Priyadarshan, Shakthi Vasudevan, Amy Jackson, Jithan Ramesh, Karthi and Arya as the chief guests, along with the cast and crew. Preceded by a magic show and Prakash's musical troupe performing the songs live on stage, each songs were also launched by the respective chief guests before the audio CD being unveiled by Rama Narayanan and Priyadarshan.

== Track listing ==
All lyrics are written by Na. Muthukumar.

No.	Title	Singer(s)	Length
1.	"Kadha Solla Poren"	Vikram, Shringa S.	05:38
2.	"Vizhigalil Oru Vaanavil"	Saindhavi	06:00
3.	"Pa Pa Pappa"	Vikram	05:51
4.	"Vennilave"	G. V. Prakash Kumar	03:33
5.	"Jagada Thom"	S. P. Balasubrahmanyam, Maya, Rajesh	05:20
6.	"Aariro"	Haricharan	05:25
7.	"Life Is Beautiful"	Kalyan, Navin Iyer	01:44
Total length:			33:31

== Critical response ==
The soundtrack album received positive reviews from music critics. Pavithra Srinivasan from Rediff.com also gave the similar score, opining that the album has "numbers that fit in, almost formulaic fashion, with the angst and emotion that's required of a movie like this. The good thing is that G V Prakash, despite going with tried and trusted tunes, manages to make them melodious and touching." Karthik Srinivasan of Milliblog wrote "Melodious tunes packaged cleverly to appeal – GVP succeeds again". A reviewer based at CNN-IBN wrote "G.V. Prakash Kumar's background score is good but the songs could have been better. "Vizhigalil Oru Vaanavil" is melodious and the picturisation of "Ore Oru Oorukkulley" is interesting." Malathi Rangarajan of The Hindu wrote "Special plaudits to [...] G. V. Prakash Kumar for the melody of the refrain. RR is also a major plus — lilting and in tune with the mood of the scenes, it is aurally elevating." S. Viswanath of Deccan Herald wrote "G V Prakash’s haunting background score provides exalted experience."

N. Venkateswaran of The Times of India wrote"G V Prakash had given us some good songs in Vijay’s earlier movie ‘Madarasapattinam’ and the young composer has come up with some fine songs and a good background score in ‘Deiva Thirumagal’ too. ‘Pa pa pa’, a delightful number by Vikram with cute lyrics by Na Muthukumar, describes the joy a father feels in welcoming a child into this world. ‘Kathai solla poren’ is another enjoyable song for its excellent computer graphics work and the way little Nila keeps poking holes into her father’s wildly heroic stories. ‘Arirarao’ by Haricharan tugs at your heartstrings because of the splendid work by the singer and the music composer."

== Accolades ==
Award (Note: Awards, festivals and organizations are in alphabetical order.)	Date of ceremony (Note: Date is linked to the article about the awards held that year, wherever possible.)	Category	Recipient(s)	Result	Ref.
Ananda Vikatan Cinema Awards	5 January 2012	Best Playback Singer – Female	Saindhavi – for ("Vizhigalil Oru Vaanavil") (Note: also for "Pirai Thedum" from Mayakkam Enna (2011))	Won	
Filmfare Awards South	7 July 2012	Best Music Director – Tamil	G. V. Prakash Kumar	Nominated	
Filmfare Awards South	7 July 2012	Best Lyricist – Tamil	Na. Muthukumar – for ("Vizhigalil Oru Vaanavil")	Nominated	
Filmfare Awards South	7 July 2012	Best Female Playback Singer – Tamil	Saindhavi – for ("Vizhigalil Oru Vaanavil")	Nominated	
Mirchi Music Awards South	4 August 2012	Listener's Choice Award − Song	G. V. Prakash Kumar for ("Arariro")	Won (1st place)	
Mirchi Music Awards South	4 August 2012	Listener's Choice Award − Album	G. V. Prakash Kumar	Won (3rd place)	
Vijay Awards	16 June 2012	Best Background Score	G. V. Prakash Kumar	Nominated	
Vijay Awards	16 June 2012	Best Lyricist	Na. Muthukumar – for ("Vizhigalil Oru Vaanavil")	Nominated	
Vijay Awards	16 June 2012	Best Male Playback Singer	Haricharan – for ("Aariraro")	Nominated	

== Controversy ==
The song "Jagada Thom" was alleged to be taken from Amaan Ali Khan and Ayaan Ali Khan's 2007 song "Truth" from the eponymous album. Another song "Pa Pa Pappa" was also alleged to be lifted from the 1973 song "Whistle Stop" composed by Roger Miller for the film Robin Hood (1973).
