= Thamarai =

Indian writer

- Born: 10 November 1976 (age 50); Coimbatore, Tamil Nadu, India
- Education: Government College of Technology, Coimbatore 1992-1996 Batch
- Occupations: Lyricist, poet, journalist
- Years active: 1997–present
- Works: Full list
- Spouse: Thozhar Thiyagu
- Children: 1
- Awards: Full list

Thamarai (born 10 November 1976) is an Indian poet and lyricist who writes in Tamil. She is a prominent figure in the Tamil literary world and has worked in Tamil cinema.

She made her debut in the Tamil film industry through the 1998 film Iniyavale, which was directed by Seeman and had music composed by Deva.

== Life and career ==
Thamarai was born in Coimbatore, Tamil Nadu on 10 November 1976. She graduated from Government College of Technology, Coimbatore, in production engineering 1992-1996 Batch and worked for six years in Coimbatore. With her passion for poetry, she decided to move to Chennai, where she worked as a freelance journalist in an organization named Bhagya and wrote essays, stories and poems. Through her literary works, she became popular and got noticed. Director Seeman assigned her as lyricist for the song "Thendral Enthan" for his Tamil film Iniyavale. Subsequently, she wrote lyrics for films such as Unnidathil Ennai Koduthen ("Malligai Poove") and Thenali ("Injirango Injirango"). Her work together with music director Harris Jayaraj in Minnale marked the turning point in her film industry career, primarily noted for her song "Vaseegara" in the movie.

After Minnale, the trio, composed of director Gautham Vasudev Menon and music director Harris Jayaraj, teamed up several times again (Kaakha Kaakha, Vettaiyaadu Vilaiyaadu, Pachaikili Muthucharam and Vaaranam Aayiram) and were a very successful collaboration in the film field, until the break-up between Menon and Jayaraj happened. Since then, she is teaming up with A. R. Rahman, who replaced Jayaraj. Menon, Jayaraj and Thamarai teamed up again in July 2014 for the Ajith Kumar film Yennai Arindhaal. The film's album was released on 1 January 2015, and it was well-received by critics. She wrote" Neeraambal Poovae" from the movie Nannbenda, where she again worked for Harris Jayaraj. The song is sung by Arjun Menon.

== Personal life ==
Thamarai was married to Thozhar Thiyagu. They have a son. Thamarai is a vegan and an advocate of animal rights.

== Filmography ==
Year	Film	Song(s)	Music composer
1998	Iniyavale	"Thendral Enthan"	Deva
1998	Unnidathil Ennai Koduthen	"Malligai Poove"	S. A. Rajkumar
1998	Pudhumai Pithan	"Onnu Rendu"	Deva
1999	Kallazhagar	"Thoonda Thoonda"	Deva
1999	Viralukketha Veekkam	"Viralukketha Veekkam"	Deva
1999	Kannodu Kanbathellam	"Ae Kuruvi"	Deva
1999	Pudhu Kudithanam	"Nilavukku Yennadi"	Deva
1999	Unnaruge Naan Irundhal	"Enthan Uyire"	Deva
2000	James Pandu	"Vennila Ethuvum"	S. A. Rajkumar
2000	Veeranadai	"Singanadai"	Deva
2000	Veeranadai	"Usuravechan Mama"	Deva
2000	Thenali	"Injerungo Injerungo"	A. R. Rahman
2001	Minnale	"Vaseegara"	Harris Jayaraj
2001	Minnale	"Iru Vizhi Unadhu"	Harris Jayaraj
2001	Minnale	"Ivan Yaaro"	Harris Jayaraj
2001	Maayan	"Alli Kulathu"	Deva
2001	Maayan	"Oru Naadu"	Deva
2001	Aandan Adimai	"Enna Enna Paada"	Ilaiyaraaja
2001	Nandhaa	"Kalli Adi Kalli"	Yuvan Shankar Raja
2001	Love Marriage	"Roja Malare"	Deva
2001	Samrat Asoka	All songs	Anu Malik
2001	Majunu	"Hari Gori"	Harris Jayaraj
2001	Kadhale Swasam	"Kadhale Kadhale Swasam", "Manam Valikkudhe" & "Summa Iru"	D. Imman
2002	Thamizh	"Vikkuthey Vikkuthey"	Bharadwaj
2002	123	"April Mazhai"	Deva
2002	Ezhumalai	"Un Punnagai"	Mani Sharma
2002	Run	"Panikaatrey"	Vidyasagar
2002	Namma Veetu Kalyanam	"Minnuthu Minnuthu"	S. A. Rajkumar
2002	Album	"Nilave Nilave"	Karthik Raja
2002	April Maadhathil	"Yea Nenje"	Yuvan Shankar Raja
2002	Jaya	"Jinjinna Jinjinna" & "Nilave Nilave"	Bharani
2002	Mutham	"Laiko Laiko"	Bharani
2002	Vetri	All Songs	Harris Jayaraj
2003	Chokka Thangam	"Vellai Manam"	Deva
2003	Anbu	"Thavamindri Kidaitha"	Vidyasagar
2003	Saamy	"Idhu Thaana"	Harris Jayaraj
2003	Ice	"Nenjil Nenjil Un Per" & "Ore Oru Ganam"	Devi Sri Prasad
2003	Whistle	"Azhagiya Asura"	D. Imman
2003	Kaakha Kaakha	All Songs	Harris Jayaraj
2003	Alai	"En Ragasiya"	Vidyasagar
2004	Engal Anna	"Mudhal Mudhalaga"	Deva
2004	Jai	"Medhu Medhuvai"	Mani Sharma
2004	Pudhukottaiyilirundhu Saravanan	"Malargale Malargale"	Yuvan Shankar Raja
2004	Thendral	"Adi Thozhi" & "Ye Penne"	Vidyasagar
2004	Varnajalam	"Nee Vendum"	Vidyasagar
2004	Kadhal Dot Com	"Imaikkatha Vizhigal"	Bharadwaj
2004	Kuthu	"Ennai Theendi Vittai"	Srikanth Deva
2004	Perazhagan	"Oru Azhagana"	Yuvan Shankar Raja
2004	Arasatchi	"Arakonathil Aarambam" & "O Muhalai Muhalai"	Harris Jayaraj
2004	Oru Murai Sollividu	"Eppadi Solvathu"	Bharadwaj
2004	Bose	"Doli Doli"	Yuvan Shankar Raja
2004	Manathil	"Ennai Kadhalikamal"	Bharani
2005	Jithan	"Ennai Thedi"	Srikanth Deva
2005	ABCD	"Dhavam Ondru"	D. Imman
2005	Thotti Jaya	"Uyire En Uyire" & "Yaaridamum"	Harris Jayaraj
2005	Ghajini	"Oru Maalai" & "Rahathulla"	Harris Jayaraj
2005	Kanda Naal Mudhal	All Songs	Yuvan Shankar Raja
2005	Sandakozhi	"Ketta Kodukkira Boomi"	Yuvan Shankar Raja
2005	Kadhalanathey	"Kadhal Kaara"	Deva
2006	Vettaiyaadu Vilaiyaadu	All Songs	Harris Jayaraj
2006	Vallavan	"Vallava"	Yuvan Shankar Raja
2006	Nenjil Jil Jil	"Kaadhal Thaana"	D. Imman
2006	Nenjirukkum Varai	"Oru Murai Piranthen"	Srikanth Deva
2007	Pachaikili Muthucharam	All Songs except "Unakkul Naane"	Harris Jayaraj
2007	Azhagiya Tamil Magan	"Kelamal"	A. R. Rahman
2007	Kannamoochi Yenada	All Songs	Yuvan Shankar Raja
2008	Bheemaa	"Siru Paaravaiyaale"	Harris Jayaraj
2008	Vaitheeswaran	"Kangalum Thoongathey" & "Mudhal Mudhal"	Srikanth Deva
2008	Subramaniapuram	"Kangal Irandal"	James Vasanthan
2008	Vaaranam Aayiram	All Songs except "Yethi Yethi"	Harris Jayaraj
2009	Yaavarum Nalam	All Songs	Shankar-Ehsaan-Loy
2009	Pasanga	"Oru Vetkam Varudhe"	James Vasanthan
2009	Saa Boo Thiri	"Putham Pudhidhai"	Abbas Rafi
2009	Aadhavan	"Yeno Yeno Panithuli"	Harris Jayaraj
2010	Kutty	"Yaro En Nenjai"	Devi Sri Prasad
2010	Vinnaithaandi Varuvaayaa	All Songs except "Aaromale"	A. R. Rahman
2011	Thoonga Nagaram	"Koorana Paarvaigal"	Sundar C. Babu
2011	Engeyum Kadhal	"Engeyum Kadhal" & "Lolita"	Harris Jayaraj
2011	Rowthiram	"Maalai Mangum Neram"	Prakash Nikki
2011	Vandhaan Vendraan	"Kanchana Mala"	Thaman S
2011	Vedi	"Enna Aachi"	Vijay Antony
2011	Vellore Maavattam	"Unnai Unnai"	Sundar C. Babu
2012	Muppozhudhum Un Karpanaigal	All Songs	G. V. Prakash Kumar
2012	Maattrraan	"Yaaro Yaaro"	Harris Jayaraj
2013	Settai	"Arjuna Arjuna"	Thaman S
2013	Endrendrum Punnagai	"Ennai Saaithaalae"	Harris Jayaraj
2014	Idhu Kathirvelan Kadhal	"Anbae Anbae" & "Vizhiyae Vizhiyae"	Harris Jayaraj
2014	Bramman	"Un Kannai"	Devi Sri Prasad
2014	Damaal Dumeel	"Pogadhae Pogadhae"	Thaman S
2014	Irumbu Kuthirai	All Songs except "Hello Brother"	G. V. Prakash Kumar
2014	Yaan	"Nee Vandhu Ponadhu"	Harris Jayaraj
2015	Yennai Arindhaal	All Songs except "Adhaaru Adhaaru"	Harris Jayaraj
2015	Nannbenda	"Neeraambal Poovae"	Harris Jayaraj
2015	Romeo Juliet	"Thoovaanam"	D. Imman
2015	Naanum Rowdy Dhaan	"Neeyum Naanum"	Anirudh Ravichander
2016	Gethu	"Adiyae Adiyae" & "Thaen Kaatru"	Harris Jayaraj
2016	Kadhalum Kadandhu Pogum	"Akkam Pakkam Par"	Santhosh Narayanan
2016	Pencil	"Kangalilae" & "Yaarai Polum Illa Neeyum"	G. V. Prakash Kumar
2016	Meendum Oru Kadhal Kadhai	"Mohini"	G. V. Prakash Kumar
2016	Iru Mugan	"O Maya"	Harris Jayaraj
2016	Achcham Yenbadhu Madamaiyada	"Raasali" & "Thalli Pogathey"	A. R. Rahman
2017	Bogan	"Senthoora"	D. Imman
2017	Si3	"Mudhal Murai"	Harris Jayaraj
2017	Bongu	"Sollava" & "Vaanam"	Srikanth Deva
2017	Magalir Mattum	"Ghandhari Yaaro"	Ghibran
2017	Theeran Adhigaaram Ondru	"Oru Veetil"	Ghibran
2018	Thaanaa Serndha Koottam	"Engae Endru Povathu"	Anirudh Ravichander
2018	Nagesh Thiraiyarangam	"Kangal Rendum"	Srikanth Deva
2018	Nimir	"Epodhum Unmael" & "Nenjil Mamazhai"	B. Ajaneesh Loknath
2019	Viswasam	"Kannaana Kanney"	D. Imman
2019	Dev	"Anangae Sinungalama" & "Oru Nooru Murai"	Harris Jayaraj
2019	Aruvam	"Aruvam Theme"	Thaman S
2019	Airaa	"Megathoodham"	K. S. Sundaramurthy
2019	Enai Noki Paayum Thota	All Songs	Darbuka Siva
2021	Maara	All Songs	Ghibran
2021	Bhoomi	"Kadai Kannaaley"	D. Imman
2021	Annaatthe	"Ennuyire"	D. Imman
2022	Anbarivu	"Thanga Sela"	Hiphop Tamizha
2022	Anbarivu	"Kannirendum"	Hiphop Tamizha
2022	Valimai	"Enna Kurai"	Yuvan Shankar Raja
2022	Mudhal Nee Mudivum Nee	"Mudhal Nee Mudivum Nee"	Darbuka Siva
2022	Cobra	"Tharangini"	A. R. Rahman
2022	Cobra	"Uyir Urugudhey"	A. R. Rahman
2022	Vendhu Thanindhathu Kaadu	"Kaalathukkum Nee Venum"	A. R. Rahman
2022	Vendhu Thanindhathu Kaadu	"Muthu's Journey"	A. R. Rahman
2022	Vendhu Thanindhathu Kaadu	"Marakuma Nenjam"	A. R. Rahman
2022	Vendhu Thanindhathu Kaadu	"Unna Nenachadhum"	A. R. Rahman
2022	Vendhu Thanindhathu Kaadu	"Mallipoo"	A. R. Rahman
2024	Marakkuma Nenjam	"Saaral Aagindra Mazhai"	Sachin Warrier
2024	Marakkuma Nenjam	"Netrum Indrum"	Sachin Warrier
2024	Marakkuma Nenjam	"Vaanilai"	Sachin Warrier
2024	Siren	"Netru Varai"	G. V. Prakash Kumar
2024	Indian 2	"Neelorpam"	Anirudh Ravichander
2024	Brother	"Akka Song"	Harris Jayaraj
2024	Nirangal Moondru	"Megham Pol Aagi"	Jakes Bejoy
2025 | Ace	"Urugudhu Urugudhu"		
TBA	Dhruva Natchathiram	"Oru Manam"	Harris Jayaraj
TBA	Dhruva Natchathiram	"Naracha Mudi"	Harris Jayaraj
TBA	Dhruva Natchathiram	"Arugil"	Harris Jayaraj

=== Television ===
- 2003 Penn
- 2003 Ninaivugal
- 2009 Latchiyam
- 2013 Chithiram Pesuthadi
- 2013 Kurinji Malar

== Awards ==
Filmfare Awards South

- Filmfare Award for Best Lyricist – Vaaranam Aayiram (2008)
- Filmfare Award for Best Lyricist – Vinnaithaandi Varuvaayaa (2010)
- Filmfare Award for Best Lyricist – Achcham Yenbadhu Madamaiyada (2016)

Tamil Nadu State Film Awards

- Tamil Nadu State Film Award for Best Lyricist – Thenali (2000)
- Tamil Nadu State Film Honorary Award – Paavender Bharathidasan Award (2006)
- Tamil Nadu State Film Award for Best Lyricist – Thaainilam (2020)

Ananda Vikatan Cinema Awards

- Ananda Vikatan Award for Best Lyricist – Vaaranam Aayiram (2008)
- Ananda Vikatan Award for Best Lyricist – Vinnaithaandi Varuvaayaa (2010)
- Ananda Vikatan Award for Best Lyricist – for the song for "Thalli Pogathey" from Achcham Yenbadhu Madamaiyada (2016)
- Ananda Vikatan Award for Best Lyricist – for the song "Yaar Azhaithathu" from Maara (2021)

Vijay Awards

- Vijay Award for Best Lyricist – Vaaranam Aayiram (2008)
- Vijay Award for Best Lyricist – Muppozhudhum Un Karpanaigal (2012)

Other awards and recognition

- Cinema Express Award for Best Lyricist – Nandhaa (2001)
- ITFA Best Lyricist Award – Kaakha Kaakha (2003)
- Meera Isaiaruvi Tamil Music Award for Best Lyricist – Vaaranam Aayiram (2008)
- Zee Cine Awards - Best Lyricist for "Kaanana Kanney" - Viswasam (2020)

Nominations

- Filmfare Award for Best Lyricist – Kaakha Kaakha (2003)
- Filmfare Award for Best Lyricist – Ghajini (2005)
- Filmfare Award for Best Lyricist – Subramaniapuram (2008)
- Filmfare Award for Best Lyricist – Pasanga (2009)
- Vijay Award for Best Lyricist – Pasanga (2009)
- Vijay Award for Best Lyricist – Vinnaithaandi Varuvaayaa (2010)
- Filmfare Award for Best Lyricist – 7aum Arivu (2011)
- Filmfare Award for Best Lyricist – Yennai Arindhaal (2015)
- SIIMA Award for Best Lyricist – Achcham Yenbadhu Madamaiyada (2017)
- SIIMA Award for Best Lyricist – Viswasam
- SIIMA Award for Best Lyricist – Maara

== See also ==
- List of vegans
