= Thalli Pogathey (disambiguation) =

Thalli Pogathey (transl. Don't go away) may refer to:

- "Thalli Pogathey" (song), from the 2016 Indian film Achcham Yenbadhu Madamaiyada
- Thalli Pogathey (film), a 2021 Indian film
- Thalli Pogathey (TV series), a Singaporean TV series
