= Aadukalam (soundtrack) =

2010 soundtrack album by G. V. Prakash Kumar

Soundtrack album by G. V. Prakash Kumar
- Released: 1 December 2010
- Recorded: 2010
- Genre: Feature film soundtrack
- Length: 32:31
- Language: Tamil
- Label: Sony Music India
- Producer: G. V. Prakash Kumar

G. V. Prakash Kumar chronology
Va (2010)	Aadukalam (2010)	Deiva Thirumagal (2011)

Aadukalam (transl. Playground) is the soundtrack album for the Tamil film of the same name directed by Vetrimaaran. The film featured music composed by G. V. Prakash Kumar in his second collaboration with Vetrimaaran and Dhanush after Polladhavan (2007), and its soundtrack album features seven tracks; four songs, two rap numbers and an instrumental. Lyrics for the songs were written by Snehan, Ekadesi, Yugabharathi, V. I. S. Jayapalan and Yogi B. The album distributed by Sony Music India was released on 1 December 2010.

The songs in entirety were used as montages (sequences that travel along with the storyline) in the film, with four of the tracks were picturised on the perspective of Dhanush's character and his romance with Taapsee's character. The album opened to critical acclaim praising G. V. Prakash for his work in the soundtrack and score; critics further praised Vetrimaaran for the use of songs as montages throughout the film. Subsequently, the album received multiple accolades at various nominations, with Prakash winning the awards for Best Music Director in all ceremonies.

== Background ==
In contrary to Polladhavan, where the film songs were used due to producer's demand of "commercial elements", director Vetrimaaran planned for six tracks, without lip-sync but rather used as montages of visuals, since Vetrimaaran believed that the songs were used to move the story forward and not treated as commercial elements, as a result to be "realistic" and "contemporary". The use of all songs as montages in its entirety, is first-of-a-kind trend in Tamil cinema. Vetrimaaran added that "due to the short duration of the film, the songs narrate a story within the main plot to move the story faster and also to give the same impact as a normal scene does".

During the recording session of the film, G. V. Prakash hummed a particular tune he thought that would fit in the scheme of the storyline. As a result, Prakash started composing the song titled as "Yathe Yathe" written by Snehan, and also recorded vocals for the track. It was the first song recorded for the film. Despite, the film's rural setting, Prakash Kumar composed a rap number crooned by Yogi B, picturised on Dhanush's victory at cockfight. It had two versions: one in Tamil as "Porkalam" written by Yugabharathi, and other in English as "Warriors", written by the singer himself. V. I. S. Jayapalan, who acted in a pivotal role in the film, had also penned a song titled "En Vennilave", a sad number, recorded by KK. S. P. Balasubrahmanyam and his son S. P. B. Charan recorded the song "Ayyayo" written by Snehan, with female vocals crooned by Prashanthini.

Apart from the rap songs "Porkalam" and "Warriors", the rest of the tracks were picturised of the perspective of the character K. P. Karuppu (Dhanush), and his romance with Irene (Taapsee Pannu). The song "Yathe Yathe" is played when Karuppu sees Irene properly for the first time, and "En Vennilave" is about Karuppu's thoughts after Irene refuses to love him. The song "Ayyayo" is played when Irene has a change of heart, rekindles Karuppu's feelings towards her. Although, all the songs were used as montages in the film, it featured a dance sequence for the song "Otha Sollala" crooned by Velmurugan. It was choreographed by Dinesh Kumar, featuring Dhanush as K. P. Karuppu, shaking his lungi, dances on the busy streets of Madurai as if nobody's watching, after Irene reciprocated his proposal. It served as one of the signature dance moves and was praised by audiences and fans.

== Release ==
The album was highly anticipated among fans, after the soundtrack composed by Prakash Kumar for Vetrimaaran's debut film Polladhavan, became a runaway chartbuster upon release. The soundtrack, distributed by Sony Music India, was released at a low-key function at Lady Aandal School auditorium in Chennai on 1 December 2010, featuring the attendance of the film's cast and crew and the function saw a live performance by Prakash and his musical team. The song "Yathe Yathe" topped the charts and remained in the No.1 position for nearly five weeks.

== Critical reception ==
The album opened to positive critical feedback. Karthik Srinivasan of Milliblog opined that "Vetrimaaran and Prakash's combination works far better than their previous film Polladhavan". A critic from Sify highlighted the score and songs as "one of the major plus for the film", whereas Pavithra Srinivasan of Rediff called that the music "adds depth to the proceedings". The Hindu-based critic Karthik Subramanian, apart from reviewing Prakash's work in the background score, further praised Vetrimaaran's idea of using songs as montages, calling it as "excellent" and "blends with the narrative".

== Awards and nominations ==
Award	Date of ceremony (Note: Date is linked to the article about the awards held that year, wherever possible.)	Category	Recipient(s) and nominee(s)	Result	Ref.
Ananda Vikatan Cinema Awards	5 January 2012	Best Music Director	G. V. Prakash Kumar	Won	
Ananda Vikatan Cinema Awards	5 January 2012	Best Playback Singer – Male	S. P. Balasubrahmanyam, S. P. B. Charan for "Ayyayyo"	Won	
Filmfare Awards South	7 July 2012	Best Music Director – Tamil	G. V. Prakash Kumar	Won	
Filmfare Awards South	7 July 2012	Best Male Playback Singer – Tamil	G. V. Prakash Kumar for "Yathe Yathe"	Nominated	
Mirchi Music Awards South	4 August 2012	Best Music Director	G. V. Prakash Kumar	Won	
Mirchi Music Awards South	4 August 2012	Listener's Choice Award – Song	G. V. Prakash Kumar for "Yathe Yathe"	Won (5th place)	
Mirchi Music Awards South	4 August 2012	Listener's Choice Award – Album	G. V. Prakash Kumar	Won (2nd place)	
South Indian International Movie Awards	21–22 June 2012	Best Music Director – Tamil	G. V. Prakash Kumar	Won	
Vijay Awards	16 June 2012	Best Music Director	G. V. Prakash Kumar	Won	
Vijay Awards	16 June 2012	Best Male Playback Singer	S. P. Balasubrahmanyam, S. P. B. Charan for "Ayyayo"	Nominated	
Vijay Awards	16 June 2012	Best Male Playback Singer	Velmurugan for "Otha Sollala"	Won	
Vijay Awards	16 June 2012	Best Female Playback Singer	Prashanthini for "Ayyayo"	Nominated	
Vijay Awards	16 June 2012	Best Lyricist	Snehan	Nominated	
Vijay Awards	16 June 2012	Favourite Song	"Otha Sollala"	Nominated	
Vijay Music Awards	28 October 2012	Best Folk Song	"Otha Sollala"	Won	
Vijay Music Awards	28 October 2012	Best Song Sung by a Music Director	G. V. Prakash Kumar for "Yathe Yathe"	Won	

== Legacy ==
The song "Otha Sollala" and the signature step performed by Dhanush was hailed by fans. In July 2013, when Yo Yo Honey Singh released the track "Lungi Dance", a promotional song for Chennai Express, and became viral upon release, Tamil cinema fans pointed this song and hailed the signature step calling it as the "original lungi dance". It was parodied by Sathyan in Naiyaandi (2013), whose character Parandhaman assumes that Vanaroja (Nazriya Nazim) had reciprocated his feelings, similar to that film; and also by Vijay in Theri (2016). An article from The Times of India listed "Otha Sollala" as one of the "iconic dance moments of the last decade".

== Track listing ==
No.	Title	Lyrics	Singer(s)	Length
1.	"Yathe Yathe"	Snehan	G. V. Prakash Kumar	5:44
2.	"Otha Sollaala"	Ekadesi	Velmurugan	3:58
3.	"Porkkalam" (Tamil Rap)	Yugabharathi	Alwa Vasu, Yogi B	4:20
4.	"En Vennilave"	V. I. S. Jayapalan	KK	7:17
5.	"Ayyayo"	Snehan	S. P. Balasubrahmanyam, S. P. B. Charan, Prashanthini	5:24
6.	"Warriors" (English Rap)	Yogi B	Alwa Vasu, Yogi B	4:20
7.	"A Love Blossoms"	—	Navin Iyer	1:28
Total length:				32:31
