= Narthagi =

Narthaki
- Film poster
- Directed by: G. Vijayapadma
- Produced by: Punnagai Poo Gheetha
- Cinematography: M. Kesavan
- Edited by: T. K. Thangavel Kumaran
- Music by: G. V. Prakash Kumar
- Production company: SG Films Pvt Ltd
- Release date: 13 May 2011
- Country: India
- Language: Tamil

Narthaki (transl. Dancer) is a 2011 Tamil-language drama film written and directed by Vijayapadma and produced by Punnagai Poo Gheetha. Focusing on the issue of transgender people, the film stars Kalki Subramaniam, Vivin and Girish Karnad. Music for the film was composed by G. V. Prakash Kumar and the film opened to mixed reviews in May 2011.

== Cast ==
- Kalki Subramaniam as Kalki
- Leema Babu as Meena
- Girish Karnad
- Suzane George as Kalki's mother
- Punnagai Poo Gheetha
- Vivin
- V. K. R. Raghunath
- Azhagu
- Karate Venkatesh
- Ashwin as Subbu
- Abhishek
- Abbas
- Susan
- Swathisha as transgender
- Reshma
- Harish V as Vivin's friend

== Production ==
'Punnagai Poo' Gheetha readily agreed to finance the venture after Vijayapadma approached her with the script, as she was keen to make off-beat ventures. The movie was shot for a period of two months in places such as Thanjavur, Thiruvaiyaru, Mumbai and Chennai. The film's lead performer, Kalki Subramaniam, revealed that the script was derived from the real life incidents of transgender people. The team were initially upset that the film was awarded an "A" certificate, but were unable to change the decision of the censor board.

== Release ==
The film opened to mixed reviews in May 2011. Rediff.com noted "if anything, it's the screenplay that falters at many places" and "the pace lags and picks up randomly", with "the dialogues, while trying to sound honest, appear quite clichéd at times and trite". The reviewer however adds that Narthaki "attempts to break new ground and address the pain of a community that has suffered for ages" and that "it showcases the fact that humanity needs to rise above such prejudices and accord transgenders the respect they deserve and for that, it needs to be watched". Similarly Behindwoods.com gave it a single star out of five, but added it is "an attempt that needs to be encouraged" and that "it is worth noticing since it provided answers for many questions among the general public that have very little information about the sexual minorities." Narthagi shared the Best Social Awareness Award at the 2012 Norway Tamil Film Festival Awards.

== Soundtrack ==
Narthagi

Soundtrack album by G. V. Prakash Kumar
- Released: 7 April 2011
- Genre: Feature film soundtrack

G. V. Prakash Kumar chronology
Aadukalam (2010)	Narthagi (2011)	Deiva Thirumagal (2011)

The film's soundtrack was composed by G. V. Prakash Kumar, with lyrics written by Na. Muthukumar. Reviewing the album, Behindwoods.com noted the composer "has boldly taken up an experimental project".

- "The Destiny" - Naresh Iyer and Saindhavi
- "Poovin Manam Poovil Illai" — Tippu and Harini
- "Vaan Mazhaiyin Thuligal" — P. Unnikrishnan and Sudha Raghunathan
- "Jai Jai Madha Sonthasi Madha" — Vijay Yesudas
- "Chinnanchiru Idhayathil" — Vijay Prakash and Prashanthini
