= Viswasam (soundtrack) =

Soundtrack album by D. Imman
- Released: 16 December 2018
- Recorded: 2018
- Genre: Feature film soundtrack
- Length: 52:36
- Language: Tamil
- Label: Lahari Music
- Producer: D. Imman

D. Imman chronology
| Seemaraja (2018) | Viswasam (2018) | Natasaarvabhowma (2019) |

Singles from Viswasam
- 1. "Adchithookku" Released: 10 December 2018; 2. "Vettikattu" Released: 15 December 2018; 3. "Thalle Thillaaley" Released: 20 December 2018

Viswasam is the soundtrack album composed by D. Imman for the Indian Tamil-language action drama film of the same name directed by Siva, starring Ajith Kumar and produced by Sendhil Thyagarajan and Arjun Thyagarajan of Sathya Jyothi Films. The film was initially announced with Yuvan Shankar Raja as the composer, who left the project citing schedule conflicts and several other composers were rumoured to score music before the team approached Imman as the music director. This film marked Imman's first collaboration with Ajith Kumar and Siva.

The film's soundtrack consisted of 14 tracks: six tracks, two theme songs, an instrumental and karaoke version of four songs. The soundtrack reportedly made up of rural folk genre, similar to Imman's previous films. Two songs – "Adichuthooku" and "Vettikattu" were released as singles and the album released on 16 December 2018 by Lahari Music label. The album received mixed reviews from critics, but appreciated Imman's instrumentation in tune with the film's rural setting. Imman later won the National Film Award for Best Music Direction at the 67th edition held for films released in 2019.

== Background ==
Yuvan Shankar Raja who earlier worked with Ajith Kumar in Dheena (2001), Billa (2007), Mankatha (2011), Billa II (2012) and Arrambam (2013) was speculated to compose music for the project. Sathya Jyothi Films formally confirmed his inclusion during December 2017, but the following month Yuvan stepped out of the project, citing schedule conflicts, and Sam C. S. was rumoured as the film's music director who denied the clarifications. Anirudh Ravichander who previously worked with both Siva and Ajith Kumar in Vedalam (2015) and Vivegam (2017), was also finalised to score for the film. But as the director and actor decided to work with a different composer, Anirudh was later replaced by S. Thaman, who also denied his presence following his commitments in multiple Telugu films. The team later approached D. Imman to score music for the film.

On 14 February 2018, Imman took to Twitter saying that he was officially announced a part of the project, while marking his first collaboration with Ajith and Siva. Soon after his inclusion, Imman started working on the film's music, with two songs were completed before March 2018, after which film production works were halted due to Tamil Film Producers Council strike against the digital service providers over Virtual Print Fee (VPF) hike. After production being started, shooting for the two songs were held at Ramoji Film City in Hyderabad: with one of them reported to be a "mass number" and a montage track. In September 2018, Imman revealed that four songs and a theme music will be included in the soundtrack, but he had completed five songs during that November. Lyricist Viveka joined the team in November, saying that he had written a kuthu song (titled "Adchithooku") and a melody track (titled "Vaaney Vaaney"), which is a "heart-touching number" and will be reportedly used as a montage in the film. Sid Sriram performed the song "Kannana Kanne" in his second collaboration with Imman after "Kurumba" from Tik Tik Tik (2018). Grammy Award-winning instrumentalist Praksh Sontakke performed slide guitar for the instrumental version of this song. The audio rights were purchased by Lahari Music.

== Track listing ==
| No. | Title | Lyrics | Singer(s) | Length |
|---|---|---|---|---|
| 1. | "Adchithooku" | Viveka | D. Imman, Aditya Gadhvi, Narayanan | 4:26 |
| 2. | "Kannaana Kanney" | Thamarai | Sid Sriram | 4:29 |
| 3. | "Vettikattu" | Yugabharathi | Shankar Mahadevan | 4:19 |
| 4. | "Vaaney Vaaney" | Viveka | Hariharan, Shreya Ghoshal | 4:45 |
| 5. | "Danga Danga" | Arun Bharathi | Senthil Ganesh, Rajalakshmi | 2:43 |
| 6. | "Thalle Thillaaley" | Arun Bharathi | Anthony Daasan | 1:50 |
| 7. | "Rise Up Theme" | Siva | Shenbagaraj, Narayanan, Saicharan, Vignesh Narayanan, Sarath Santhosh, Jithin Raj | 3:47 |
| 8. | "Kannaana Kanney" (Instrumental) | — | Prakash Sontakke (Slide Guitar) | 4:29 |
| 9. | "Thookudurai" (Theme) | — | D. Imman | 1:10 |
| 10. | "Alapparai" (Theme) | — | D. Imman | 2:42 |
| 11. | "Adichuthooku" (Karaoke) | | D. Imman | 4:26 |
| 12. | "Kannaana Kanney" (Karaoke) | | D. Imman | 4:28 |
| 13. | "Vettikattu" (Karaoke) | — | D. Imman | 4:19 |
| 14. | "Vaaney Vaaney" (Karaoke) | — | D. Imman | 4:45 |
| Total length: | | | | 52:37 |

== Release ==
The makers released a single track from the film on 10 December 2018, titled "Adichuthooku" which was sung by the composer D. Imman, Aditya Gadhvi and Narayanan, with lyrics written by Viveka. The Indian Express stated that "The song is filled with catchy phrases, which talks about the innate valor of Maduraikaran (a native of Madurai)". The second single "Vettikattu" sung by Shankar Mahadevan and lyrics written by Yugabharathi, was released on 15 December 2018. Lahari Music released the audio of Viswasam in YouTube and the music streaming platform Gaana which distributed the album online. After the album release, Imman revealed that a rustic folk number (later deciphered as "Thalle Thillalley") sung by Anthony Daasan and lyrics by Arun Bharathi was released on 20 December 2018.

Two theme music tracks from the film, not included in the soundtrack, was released after the film's release owing to the positive response for Imman's music. The track "Thookudurai Theme" was released on 14 January 2019 which coincided with the eve of Pongal, and another track "Alapparai Theme" was released on 4 February 2019. A year later, in December 2019, the full audio album was made available to stream in leading music platforms.

== Critical reception ==
The album received mixed reviews from music critics. Behindwoods rated the album 2.75 out of 5 stars, stating that "Imman delivers a perfect mix of mass and melodies". Surendhar MK of Firstpost stated the album as "partly enjoyable and middling" and further went on to say "It is definitely a missed opportunity for Imman, who is long known for his dependable, foolproof albums of rural entertainers" and the "weakest album compared to Siva and Ajith's previous films Veeram, Vedalam and Vivegam". Thinkal Menon of The Times of India, reviewed that "The album, overall, is an above average fare which might go well with the visuals. Most of the songs in the album bring out a festival mood, thanks to their pace and rhythm." Moviecrow wrote "Imman's soundtrack for Viswasam is an out and out surprise feast. With mass numbers and interesting duets that effortlessly balances the aura of star, class and quality, the combo of Siva and Ajith along with Imman, wipes off all the negative vibes that their repeated collaboration got." The album has been streamed by more than 500 million times in music streaming platforms as of March 2020, thus becoming one of the most Tamil streamed album. As of November 2020, the album has more than half-a-billion views in YouTube.

== Awards and nominations ==
| Award (Note: Awards, festivals and organizations are in alphabetical order.) | Date of ceremony (Note: Date is linked to the article about the awards held that year, wherever possible.) | Category | Recipient(s) | Result | Ref. |
|---|---|---|---|---|---|
| Edison Awards | 12 January 2020 | Best Music Director | D. Imman | Nominated | |
| Edison Awards | 12 January 2020 | Best Playback Singer – Male | Sid Sriram – ("Kannaana Kanney") | Won | |
| National Film Awards | 22 March 2021 | Best Music Director (Songs) | D. Imman | Won | |
| Norway Tamil Film Festival Awards | 15 January 2020 | Best Music Director | D. Imman | Won | |
| Norway Tamil Film Festival Awards | 15 January 2020 | Best Playback Singer – Male | Sid Sriram – ("Kannaana Kanney") | Won | |
| Norway Tamil Film Festival Awards | 15 January 2020 | Best Lyricist | Thamarai – ("Kannaana Kanney") | Won | |
| South Indian International Movie Awards | 18 September 2021 | Best Music Director – Tamil | D. Imman | Won | |
| South Indian International Movie Awards | 18 September 2021 | Best Lyricist – Tamil | Thamarai – ("Kannaana Kanney") | Won | |
| Zee Cine Awards Tamil | 4 January 2020 | Best Playback Singer – Male | Sid Sriram – ("Kannaana Kanney") | Won | |
| Zee Cine Awards Tamil | 4 January 2020 | Best Lyricist | Thamarai – ("Kannaana Kanney") | Won | |
| Zee Cine Awards Tamil | 4 January 2020 | Favourite Music Director | D. Imman | Won | |
| Zee Cine Awards Tamil | 4 January 2020 | Favourite Song | "Kannaana Kanney" | Won | |
