= Achcham Yenbadhu Madamaiyada (soundtrack) =

- Soundtrack cover art

Soundtrack album by A. R. Rahman
- Released: 7 October 2016
- Recorded: 2013–2016; Panchathan Record Inn and AM Studios, Chennai; Panchathan Hollywood Studios, Los Angeles
- Genre: Feature film soundtrack
- Length: 21:55
- Language: Tamil
- Labels: Ondraga Entertainment; Divo
- Producer: A. R. Rahman

A. R. Rahman chronology
24 (2016)	Achcham Yenbadhu Madamaiyada (2016)	Pelé: Birth of a Legend (2016)
External audio
- Official Audio Jukebox on YouTube

Singles from Achcham Yenbadhu Madamaiyada
- 1. ""Thalli Pogathey"" Released: 23 January 2016; 2. "Rasaali" Released: 2 June 2016; 3. "Showkali" Released: 10 August 2016

Achcham Yenbadhu Madamaiyada is the soundtrack album for the 2016 Tamil film of the same name. Starring Silambarasan and Manjima Mohan in lead roles, the film was directed by Gautham Vasudev Menon and has music composed by A. R. Rahman, collaborating with Silambarasan and Gautham Menon once again, after Vinnaithaandi Varuvaaya (2010). The song titles were revealed by Menon in March 2016. The soundtrack album consisting of five songs were released by Ondraga Entertainment and Divo on 7 October 2016.

== Development ==
A. R. Rahman's inclusion in the project was confirmed by December 2013, marking his second collaboration with Silambarasan and Gautham Menon after their critically acclaimed Vinnaithaandi Varuvaayaa soundtrack. As per the urgency of shooting, a single track with lyrics penned by Madhan Karky was recorded within three hours by the composer at his studio in Los Angeles. Recording of the songs recommenced from February 2015. By September 2015, recording of all the five tracks by A. R. Rahman was completed. For the sixth track, Rahman was yet to see the film and score it, which was later on added as the theme music.

The soundtrack album has five songs, all placed in the first half of the film. In an interview with The Times of India, Menon confirmed four tracks on the soundtrack album, one being Idhu Naal Varaiyil. The first track Showkali, is a hip-hop music portrays a group of bikers' debate on girls and bikes. The song teaser was released on 5 May 2016 feat. ADK and Sri Rascol. Silambarasan has sung and rapped out some of the lines which only featured in the film. The track Avalum Naanum, sung by Vijay Yesudas, was used in the first teaser of the film. Rasaali is set in the tunes of 90s.

The fifth track is Thalli Pogathey which features vocals by Sid Sriram. It framed the score for the film's official trailer. The song was recorded in the second week of December 2015. On 31 December 2015, the vocals on the track were fine-tuned. According to the singer: "The song is about a guy’s longing to express himself to a girl; but not knowing how to go about it and thus, having an inner conversation with himself." The song has rap-vocals by Aaryan Dinesh Kanagaratnam and backing vocals by Aparna Narayanan. The song Thalli Pogathey which was featured in the first trailer instantly became a sensation and went viral. The lyric video has crossed over 20 million views in YouTube. Owing to the popularity of Thalli Pogathey, Silambarasan recorded and released a cover version of the song on 14 January 2016. Gautham Vasudev Menon released the song titles through his official Twitter handle on 1 March 2016.

== Track listing ==
No.	Title	Lyrics	Singer(s)	Length
1.	"Showkali"	Dinesh Kanagaratnam, Vignesh Shivan, Sri Rascol	Aditya Rao, Dinesh Kanagaratnam, Sri Rascol	4:38
2.	"Idhu Naal"	Madhan Karky	Aditya Rao, Jonita Gandhi	3:39
3.	"Rasaali"	Thamarai	Sathya Prakash, Shashaa Tirupati	5:38
4.	"Avalum Naanum"	Bharathidasan	Vijay Yesudas	4:14
5.	"Thalli Pogathey"	Thamarai, Dinesh Kanagaratnam	Sid Sriram, Dinesh Kanagaratnam, Aparna Narayanan	4:26
Total length:				21:55

== Marketing and release ==
The music rights were acquired by Ondraga Entertainment and Divo. Initially, the first single track "Thalli Pogathey" was about to release on the first week of January 2016, since the lyric video of the song which was released on 31 December 2015, became popular. But, director Gautham Vasudev Menon confirmed that the single will not release on A. R. Rahman's birthday. The single was released on 26 January 2016. Simbu recorded a cover version of the song which released on 13 January 2016.

== Reception ==
The album received highly positive reviews from critics and also from audiences. Sharanya CR from The Times of India rated 4 out of 5, stating that "This one's not just for Rahmaniacs, but for all the music lovers, too" Behindwoods rated the album 3.5 out of 5, stating that "Achcham Yenbadhu Madamaiyada is an apt album from the creative combination of AR Rahman - Gautham Menon. This duo never disappoints!" Indiaglitz rated the album 4 out of 5, with a summary "We were already introduced to three (two-and-half is more like it) of the tracks already. Surprisingly, the mojo that AYM is as an album, is intact as fresh from note one, in its comprehensive form, too. For Gautam, lyrics ought to be in the purest form; so all you language lovers out there, grab a pen and take notes. As GVM keeps experimenting every aspect of love, he ropes along the best expression of such emotions, in each of his albums. And when it is AR Rahman, need we say more?" India Today gave favourable reviews resulting that "In Achcham Enbathu Madamaiyada, director Gautham Menon, actor Simbu and the Mozart of Madras, A R Rahman have collaborated for the second time after the success of Vinnaithandi Varuvaaya. Going by the cult status of VTV, the album of Achcham Enbathu Madamaiyada is likely to repeat the magic of the Gautham-Rahman combination." Sify rated the album 4 out of 5, viewing that "‘Acham Yenbathu Madamaiyada’ has AR Rahman in scintillating form with 5 masterpiece songs. GVM's success ratio with his music composers is intact and the album is bound to be renowned for the quality of lyrics it has produced. This album works instantly & one doesn't need the excuse ‘Rahman songs are slow burners’ here. It is so refreshing to see a Rahman album being uncomplicated and work in the first instance!" BollywoodLife gave a rating of 4 out of 5 stating that "AYM is definitely one of the best AR Rahman albums we have heard in recent times and he has really surpassed his previous work in 24. It's time for the Rahman fans to celebrate as he is back with a bang!"
