= Tamil Nadu State Film Award for Best Female Playback Singer =

Indian film award

The Tamil Nadu State Film Award for Best Female Playback Singer is given by the state government as part of its annual Tamil Nadu State Film Awards for Tamil (Kollywood) films. S. Janaki has won the award a record six times.

== Recipients ==
The following is the complete list of award winners and the films for which they won.

Year	Singer	Song	Film
1969	P. Susheela	"Paal Polave", "Brindavanthukku"	Uyarntha Manithan, Lakshmi Kalyanam
1969	K. B. Sundarambal		Thunaivan
1970	S. Janaki		Namma Kuzhanthaigal
1977-78	S. Janaki	"Senthoora Poove"	16 Vayathinile
1979-80	S. Janaki		Uthiripookkal
1978-79	Vani Jayaram		Azhage Unnai Aarathikkiren
1980-81	P. Susheela		Anbulla Athaan
1981-82	S. Janaki		Moondram Pirai
1982-83	S. Janaki		Kadhal Oviyam
1983	No award		
1984	No award		
1985	No award		
1986	No award		
1987	No award		
1988	K. S. Chitra		Multiple films
1989	P. Susheela	"Magane Magane Kannurangu"	Varam
1990	K. S. Chitra	"Chinna Ponnu Dhaan"	Vaigasi Poranthachu
1991	Swarnalatha	"Povoma Oorgolam"	Chinna Thambi
1992	Minmini	"Chinna Chinna Asai"	Roja
1993	Sujatha Mohan	"Netru Illadha Matram"	Pudhiya Mugam
1994	Swarnalatha	"Porale Ponnuthayi"	Karuththamma
1995	K. S. Chitra	"Kannalane"	Bombay
1996	Sujatha Mohan	"Poo Pookum Osai"	Minsaara Kanavu
1997	Harini	"Manam Virumbudhe"	Nerukku Ner
1998	Nithyashree Mahadevan	"Kannodu Kanbadellam"	Jeans
1999	S. Janaki	"Maarghazhi Thingal"	Sangamam
2000	Swarnalatha	"Evano Oruvan"	Alai Payuthey
2001	Sujatha Mohan	"Un Samayal Arayil"	Dhill
2002	Chinmayi	"Oru Deivam Thanda"	Kannathil Muthamittal
2003	Harini	"Aalanguyil"	Parthiban Kanavu
2004	K. S. Chitra	"Ovvoru Pookalume"	Autograph
2005	Bombay Jayashree	"Suttum Vizhi"	Ghajini
2006	Shreya Ghoshal	"Munbe Vaa"	Sillunu Oru Kaadhal
2007	Chinmayi	"Sahana"	Sivaji
2008	Mahathi	"Naeraa Varattuma"	Nenjathai Killadhe
2009	Mahathi	"Nenje Nenje"	Ayan
2010	Chinmayi	"Kilimanjaro"	Enthiran
2011	Swetha Mohan	Various	Multiple films
2012	Shreya Ghoshal	"Sollitaley Ava Kaadhala"	Kumki
2013	Sandhya Jayakrishna	"Onakkaga Poranthaenae"	Pannaiyarum Padminiyum
2014	Uthara Unnikrishnan	"Azhage Azhage"	Saivam
2015	Kalpana Raghavendar	"Pogiren"	36 Vayadhinile
2016	Vaikom Vijayalakshmi	"Aaravalli"	Velainu Vandhutta Vellaikaaran
2017	Shaktisree Gopalan	"Yaanji"	Vikram Vedha
2018	Aaradhana Sivakarthikeyan	"Vaayadi Petha Pulla"	Kanaa
2019	Saindhavi	"Ellu Vaya Pookalaye"	Asuran
2020	Varsha Ranjith		Thaainilam
2021	Bhavatharini	"Pannapurathu"	Maamanithan
2022	Khatija Rahman	"Kaayam"	Iravin Nizhal

== See also ==
- Tamil cinema
- Cinema of India
