= Mayakkam Enna (soundtrack) =

Tamil-language film soundtrack

Soundtrack album by G. V. Prakash Kumar
- Released: 23 September 2011
- Recorded: 2011
- Genre: Feature film soundtrack
- Length: 29:04
- Language: Tamil
- Label: Gemini Audio
- Producer: G. V. Prakash Kumar

G. V. Prakash Kumar chronology
Deiva Thirumagal (2011)	Mayakkam Enna (2011)	Muppozhudhum Un Karpanaigal (2011)

Mayakkam Enna is the soundtrack to the 2011 film of the same name directed by Selvaraghavan starring Dhanush and Richa Gangopadhyay. The soundtrack is composed by G. V. Prakash Kumar with lyrics written by Poetu Dhanush and Selvaraghavan, the former in his songwriting debut. The soundtrack was released by Gemini Audio on 23 September 2011.

== Development ==
Prakash was initially assigned as the composer in his second collaboration with Selvaraghavan following Aayirathil Oruvan (2010). In November 2010, he left the project due to "money and time issues" and was replaced by Selvaraghavan's norm collaborator Yuvan Shankar Raja. However, in April 2011, Prakash replaced Raja following the latter's commitments on other projects. The film featured five songs all of them were written by Selvaraghavan; he felt that "Usually directors are familiar with the storyline of their films", he cited Mani Ratnam who wrote the pallavi of songs in his films. Dhanush assisted Selvaraghavan in two of the songs and wrote one song "Pirai Thedum" as a sole lyricist in his debut. The song "Voda Voda Voda" was composed within 15 minutes and recorded within an hour.

== Track listing ==
No.	Title	Lyrics	Singer(s)	Length
1.	"Pirai Thedum"	Dhanush	G. V. Prakash Kumar, Saindhavi	5:32
2.	"Kadhal Yen Kadhal"	Dhanush, Selvaraghavan	Dhanush, Selvaraghavan	6:07
3.	"Voda Voda Voda"	Dhanush, Selvaraghavan	Dhanush	4:36
4.	"Mayakkam Enna Theme"	—	—	2:51
5.	"Naan Sonnadhum Mazhai"	Selvaraghavan	Naresh Iyer, Saindhavi	5:29
6.	"Ennena Seidhom Ingae"	Selvaraghavan	Harish Raghavendra	4:26

== Release ==
The soundtrack was launched at the Chennai station of Radio Mirchi station on 23 September 2011 during the breakfast show Hello Chennai, with Dhanush, Selvaraghavan and Prakash in attendance. Subsequently, tracks from the album played on air upon its launch, and a contest being held with participants winning audio CDs autographed by the film's team. The soundtrack was successful in its sales, streaming and downloads; Selvaraghavan organised an event at Radio Mirchi station on 29 October 2011 to celebrate the success.

== Reception ==
Vipin Nair of Music Aloud gave 7.5/10 saying "G V Prakash Kumar continues his good form, dishing out another appealing soundtrack for Mayakkam Enna." Pavithra Srinivasan of Rediff.com wrote "G V Prakash has tried very hard to walk away from his comfort zone and provide the kind of edgy numbers Selvaraghavan demands and has risen to the challenge." Karthik Srinivasan of Milliblog wrote "Despite inconsistent lyrics, Mayakkam Enna is a mighty competent soundtrack, at least music-wise".

== Accolades ==
Award (Note: Awards, festivals and organizations are in alphabetical order.)	Date of ceremony (Note: Date is linked to the article about the awards held that year, wherever possible.)	Category	Recipient(s) and nominee(s)	Result	Ref.
Ananda Vikatan Cinema Awards	5 January 2012	Best Music Director	G. V. Prakash Kumar (Note: also for Aadukalam (2011))	Won	
Ananda Vikatan Cinema Awards	5 January 2012	Best Playback Singer — Female	Saindhavi — ("Pirai Thedum")	Won	
Mirchi Music Awards South	4 August 2012	Female Vocalist of the Year	Saindhavi — ("Pirai Thedum")	Won	
South Indian International Movie Awards	21–22 June 2012	Best Lyricist — Tamil	Dhanush — ("Pirai Thedum")	Won	
South Indian International Movie Awards	21–22 June 2012	Best Male Playback Singer — Tamil	Dhanush — ("Voda Voda Voda")	Won	
South Indian International Movie Awards	21–22 June 2012	Best Female Playback Singer — Tamil	Saindhavi — ("Pirai Thedum")	Won	
Vijay Awards	16 June 2012	Best Female Playback Singer	Saindhavi — ("Pirai Thedum")	Nominated	
Vijay Awards	16 June 2012	Best Lyricist	Dhanush — ("Voda Voda Voda")	Nominated	
Vijay Awards	16 June 2012	Favourite Song	"Kadhal Yen Kadhal"	Nominated	

== Controversy ==
The song "Kadhal Yen Kadhal" along with "Why This Kolaveri Di" another popular single from Dhanush's 3 (2012) had been debated on how it popularized the "soup-song" genre. (Note: 'Soup' is a colloquial Tamil word which refers to young men experiencing depression after a failed relationship.) Both numbers had been subjected to criticism, particularly the former as the lyrics in the song "Adidaa avala, othada avala, vidra avala, thevaye illai" (transl. Thrash her, kick her, leave her, she doesn't need you) were misogynistic and allegedly glorified violence against women; primarily the aftermath of Swathi murder case where activists and cinephiles speculated the unrealistic portrayal of women and love in Tamil cinema were the reasons behind. In May 2019, Selvaraghavan apologized for allowing such lyrics in the song, even though he did not write it (the lyrics were co-written by Dhanush) as he felt that a director has to be socially responsible, and he should have considered on how people get influenced through such lyrics.
