= Tamil Nadu State Film Award for Best Lyricist =

Indian film award

The Tamil Nadu State Film Award for Best Lyricist is given by the state government as part of its annual Tamil Nadu State Film Awards for Tamil-language (Kollywood) films.

== The list ==
Year	Lyricist	Film
1968	Kannadasan	Lakshmi Kalyanam
1969	Marudakasi	Thunaivan
1970	Vaali	Engal Thangam
1971	No award	No award
1972	No award	No award
1973	No award	No award
1974	No award	No award
1975	No award	No award
1976	No award	No award
1977-78	Pulamaipithan	Madhuraiyai Meetta Sundharapandiyan
1978-79	Muthulingam	Kizhake Pogum Rail
1979-80	Vaali	Ivargal Vidhyasamanavargal
1980-81	Pulamaipithan	Engamma Maharani
1981-82	Vairamuthu	Alaigal Oivathillai
1982-83	Chidambaranathan	Thooral Ninnu Pochchu
1983	No award	No award
1984	No award	No award
1985	No award	No award
1986	No award	No award
1987	No award	No award
1988	Pulamaipithan	Several films
1989	Vaali	Varusham Padhinaaru, Apoorva Sagodharargal
1990	Vaali	Keladi Kanmani
1991	Piraisoodan	En Rasavin Manasile
1992	Kalidasan	Neenga Nalla Irukkanum
1993	Pulamaipithan	Pathini Penn
1994	Vairamuthu	Karuthamma
1995	Vairamuthu	Bombay, Muthu
1996	Piraisoodan	Thayagam
1997	Palani Bharathi	Kadhalukku Mariyadhai
1998	Arivumathi	Kizhakkum Merkkum
1999	Vairamuthu	Sangamam
2000	Thamarai	Thenali
2001	Snehan	Pandavar Bhoomi
2002	Ravi Shankar	Unnai Ninaithu, Varushamellam Vasantham
2003	Kabilan	Parthiban Kanavu
2004	Snehan	Perazhagan
2005	Na. Muthukumar, Vairamuthu	Ghajini, Anniyan
2006	Pa. Vijay	-
2007	Vairamuthu	Periyar
2008	Vaali	Dasavathaaram
2009	Yugabharathi	Pasanga
2010	Piraisoodan	Neeyum Naanum
2011	Muthulingam	Medhai
2012	Na. Muthukumar	Several films
2013	Na. Muthukumar	Thanga Meenkal
2014	Na. Muthukumar	Saivam
2015	Vivek	36 Vayadhinile
2016	Madhan Karky	24
2017	Vivek	Theeran Adhigaram Ondru
2018	Thiagarajan Kumararaja	Seethakaathi
2019	Kabilan	NGK
2020	Thamarai	Thaainilam
2021	Thamarai	Maara
2022	Ilango Krishnan	Ponniyin Selvan: I

== See also ==
- Tamil cinema
- Cinema of India
