= Achcham Yenbadhu Madamaiyada =

2016 Indian film by Gautham Vasudev Menon

- Theatrical release poster
- Directed by: Gautham Vasudev Menon
- Written by: Gautham Vasudev Menon
- Produced by: Venkat Somasundaram; Reshma Ghatala
- Starring: Silambarasan; Manjima Mohan; Baba Sehgal
- Cinematography: Dan Macarthur; Additional Cinematography: Dani Raymond; Theni Eswar
- Edited by: Anthony
- Music by: A. R. Rahman
- Production company: Ondraga Entertainment
- Distributed by: Ayngaran International
- Release date: 11 November 2016
- Running time: 135 minutes
- Country: India
- Language: Tamil

Achcham Yenbadhu Madamaiyada (transl. Fear is Foolishness) is a 2016 Indian Tamil-language romantic action thriller film written and directed by Gautham Vasudev Menon. The film stars Silambarasan and Manjima Mohan (in her Tamil debut), while Baba Sehgal plays the role of a corrupt cop. The film revolves around a youngster who embarks on a road trip with his lady-love during which he meets with an accident which causes things to get out of control.

Principal photography commenced in November 2013, however, in June 2014, filming schedules were postponed until Menon completed his other project Yennai Arindhaal (2015) with Ajith Kumar. Filming recommenced on 21 February 2015, majority of shooting was done in Chennai, India. The film features film score and soundtrack album composed by A. R. Rahman, with lyrics by Thamarai. It was simultaneously made in Telugu as Sahasam Swasaga Sagipo with Naga Chaitanya replacing Silambarasan and Manjima Mohan in the same role. This film's title is based on a song from Mannathi Mannan (1960).

== Plot ==
The protagonist, whose name is not mentioned, is revealed to be a care free MBA student and bike enthusiast, accompanied by his close friends Mahesh, Shyam, Srikanth and Auto Selvam. He has two sisters and two love stories that revolved around him in the past, one is Sukanya, and the other, Mallika. He now considers his new bike, Thunderbird, as his first love ever. However, he meets and falls in love with Leela, a friend of his sister, Maythrie, who stays in his house to complete her studies. He plans a long road trip in his bike to Kanyakumari along with his friend Mahesh, but he ditches his friend in the last minute and is accompanied by Leela instead.

They head to Kanyakumari via Salem, Palakkad, and Trivandrum. The protagonist also humorously finds out about Leela's gluttony, over food. On the trip, they go to a village and stay for a night, where they are taken care by a kind-hearted villager. The next day, they reach Kanyakumari and see the sunrise. During the course of the trip, Leela falls for him. After the trip, he agrees to drop her at her home, in Kolhapur. On their way to Maharashtra, they meet with a road accident. The protagonist injures his shoulder and proposes to her, before fainting, as if he was about to die. The next day he wakes up to find himself in a hospital. He feels that something is wrong after phoning Leela.

The same day, Leela's parents are attacked by some unknown assailants. The protagonist and his friend, Mahesh, visit the hospital that Leela and her parents are in. The three of them discover that Leela was the target of the attack. The protagonist decides to save Leela. But they encounter a corrupt cop, Kamath, who, with a help of a gangster, Hiren, kill Leela's parents. Unfortunately, Mahesh is also killed in the incident. The protagonist is devastated by this and vows to avenge Mahesh's and Leela's parents's death at any cost. Leela and the protagonist go into hiding, where Kamath tries to trace them out, even in Mahesh's funeral. Kamath finally reaches his house, in Chennai, where another friend of the protagonist, poses as the owner of his bike, with fake proof.

Deceived, Kamath returns to Maharashtra. Two years later, Kamath is preparing to receive his new superior police officer, in Kolhapur. The new officer is none other than the protagonist himself; he is now the new DCP of Kolhapur, who went into a self-imposed exile, studied for the UPSC exam, and chose IPS, despite being eligible for IAS, to fulfill his vengeance. Finally, his name is revealed to be 'Rajinikanth Muralitharan'. He also reveals the reason behind hiding his name so far; his mother, being a big fan of Rajinikanth, without any hesitations, named him so, as soon as he was born. Whenever anybody came to know of his name, they would look at him for an extra few seconds, which is why, he seldom states his name to others.

Rajini then reveals that he has unravelled what happened two years ago to Kamath. Leela's biological father, Nathuram Dubey, is a politician in Maharashtra, and the candidate for Chief Minister of Maharashtra. He planned to kill Leela as she was his illegitimate daughter and thus, a danger to his political ambitions. Kamath, with the help of Hiren, executed his plan. Rajini discovered that Leela's actual mother, Anamika, knew of the incident. After his probation, Rajini devised a plan to eliminate everyone involved in the scheme. Nathuram is arrested and brought into the station. Kamath, defeated, tries to kill Rajini, and shoots Nathuram. Finally, Rajini kills Kamath, in self-defense, avenging Mahesh's and Leela's parents' deaths. He gets a vacation, based on personal trauma, and returns home. He picks up Leela from the village they stayed in, on their way to Kanyakumari. Later, they both go on a bike trip to Kanyakumari, again, only for Rajini to propose to Leela.

== Cast ==
- Silambarasan as DCP Rajinikanth Muralitharan IPS
- Manjima Mohan as Leela Raman
- Baba Sehgal as Inspector Kamath
- Sathish Krishnan as Mahesh, Rajinikanth's friend
- Daniel Balaji as Gangster Hiren
- Nagineedu as Raman, Leela's Father
- R. N. R. Manohar as Mahesh's father
- Anjali Rao as Maythrei, Rajinikanth's Sister
- Krrish Menon as Atul Tripude
- Mathew Varghese as Muralitharan, Rajinikanth's father
- Sujata Panju as Rajinikanth's mother
- Vasantha as Leela's mother
- Chalakudy Sunil as a cop in Maharashtra
- K K Menon as Somnath Naik
- Prasad Athalye as Dr. Yashwant Tripude, Atul's father
- Vishwanath as Nathuram Dubey, a corrupt politician, Leela's biological father
- Priya Rajkumar as Anamika, Leela's biological mother
  - Samragni as young Anamika
- Saran Bhaskar as Maythrei's stalker
- R. Shyam as Shyam, Rajinikanth's friend
- Vicky Vijai as Srikanth, Rajinikanth's friend
- R. S. Karthik as Auto Selvam, Rajinikanth's friend
- Amruth as Rajinikanth's friend
- Rishabh as Inspector Thambe
- Anandhi as Mallika
- Chandru BCS as Duty Doctor
- Madurai Mohan as Villager
- Jaydev Subramaniam as Hospital receptionist
- Samson T Wilson as a gangster in the Hospital
- Elyas Khan as a gangster in the Hospital
- Sunitha Ojha as Nurse
- Bullet Babu as an Ambulance driver
- S Sayath as a Taxi driver
- Khaleel L as a cop in Maharashtra
- Anil Bala as a cop in Maharashtra
- Birlaa Bose as a cop in Chennai
- Prayas Mann as a cop in Maharashtra
- Gautham Vasudev Menon as a Police Officer (cameo)

== Production ==
=== Pre-production ===
After the success of Vinnaithaandi Varuvaayaa, Gautham Vasudev Menon narrated the script to Vijay along with Yohan Adhyayam Ondru script as the actor felt it wouldn't suit his image and for the audience. Menon announced in October 2013 that he would produce and direct a film featuring Simbu in the lead role after the following success of Vinnaithaandi Varuvaayaa.

=== Development ===
In an interview with the Bangalore Mirror, Menon stated that the film was originally titled Sattendru Maarathu Vaanilai and described the film as one which starts as a "love story" and then enters a "violent / action space". Menon outlined the storyline of the film, stating, "It is the story of a happy-go-lucky guy (played by Silambarasan) who is looking to do normal things in life but then, a situation is thrown at him and it changes everything", adding that the story is inspired by the scene in the film The Godfather where a bruised Michael Corleone plots revenge against the corrupt policeman McCluskey. Menon had previously portrayed cops as heroes but in this film, he revealed that the cop was the antagonist. When he was writing the second half of the film, he ensured not to watch films in the other genre. In December 2013, A. R. Rahman was officially confirmed to compose the songs, while Dan Macarthur was confirmed as the film's cinematographer. Baba Sehgal was chosen to portray a negative role as a cop.

=== Filming ===
While the team was still in the process of casting a female lead opposite Silambarasan, principal photography began in mid-November 2013 with a ten-day schedule in Adyar, Chennai, with scenes featuring Silambarasan and Sathish Krishnan were shot. Later, filming continued for ten days with Pallavi Subhash as the female lead. Further, the shooting progressed during the nights, in and around Kalakshetra and Thiruvanmiyur. A second schedule began in early December 2013 featuring scenes with the lead cast in urban Chennai. The film was shot for thirty days and was put on hold until Menon completed filming Yennai Arindhaal (2015).

In 2015, Pallavi Subhash could not allot bulk dates to the film and was replaced by Former Malayalam Baby Artist Manjima Mohan, as Female lead. She was cast after actor Vineeth Srinivasan made Menon watch the trailer of Oru Vadakkan Selfie and then Manjima was auditioned and selected for the role. Filming began from 21 February 2015, re-shooting all previous scenes with Manjima Mohan. By September 2015, four songs were filmed and the team was left with 20 days of work. By November 2015, ninety percent of the filming was completed. The next schedule comprised 30 allotted days. On 17 February 2016, the climax portions were being filmed in Adyar, Chennai. However, a stunt made Silambarasan suffer facial injuries, postponing the filming schedules.

== Music ==
A. R. Rahman's inclusion in the project was confirmed by December 2013, marking his second collaboration with Silambarasan and Gautham Menon after their critically acclaimed Vinnaithaandi Varuvaayaa soundtrack. As per the urgency of shooting, a single track with lyrics penned by Madhan Karky was recorded within three hours by the composer at his studio in Los Angeles. Recording of the songs recommenced from February 2015. By September 2015, recording of all the five tracks by A. R. Rahman was completed. For the sixth track, Rahman was yet to see the film and score it, which was later on added as the theme music. The soundtrack album has five songs, all placed in the first half of the film.

The first single, "Thalli Pogathey", was released on 23 January 2016, and became popular among listeners, as the lyric video of the song crossed 20 million views. The second single, "Rasaali", was released on 2 June 2016, followed by the third single track "Showkali", on 10 August. The full album was exclusively launched in iTunes on 9 September 2016. A month later, the album was released digitally on 7 October 2016, and a physical release on 10 October 2016.

The album received highly positive reviews from critics and audiences. Sharanya CR from The Times of India rated 4 out of 5, stating that "This one's not just for Rahmaniacs, but for all the music lovers, too" Behindwoods rated the album 3.5 out of 5, stating that "Achcham Yenbadhu Madamaiyada is an apt album from the creative combination of AR Rahman - Gautham Menon. This duo never disappoints!" Sify rated the album 4 out of 5, viewing that "‘Acham Yenbathu Madamaiyada’ has AR Rahman in scintillating form with 5 masterpiece songs. GVM's success ratio with his music composers is intact, and the album is bound to be renowned for the quality of lyrics it has produced. This album works instantly & one doesn't need the excuse ‘Rahman songs are slow burners’ here. It is so refreshing to see a Rahman album being uncomplicated and work in the first instance!"

== Reception ==
Manoj Kumar R of The Indian Express gave 3/5 stars and wrote, "AYM has several moments that show hero’s transformation from a aimless boy to a man, who begins to take control of his life. And it has scenes where you burst into claps and laughs in appreciation of his bravery." Anupama Subramanian of Deccan Chronicle wrote, "AYM is a film of metamorphosis: what happens when a privileged and slightly premature adult faces threats that are more than just about himself." M Suganth of The Times of India gave 2.5/5 stars and wrote, "From the hero’s confrontations with the villains to the final act — which tries to ride on the mystery around his name and explain the trail of violence with exposition — everything feels inorganic, suggesting a filmmaker grappling hard and failing to prevent his film from becoming convoluted. The promising road trip turns into an endless stretch." Baradwaj Rangan wrote for The Hindu: "Is Menon genuinely trying to subvert our expectations from the star-driven masala movie as well as our expectations from his very specific brand of romance? Or is he just cooking up an alphabet soup to satisfy the A, B and C centres? The question is more interesting than this underwhelming film." Hindustan Times gave 1.5/5 stars and wrote, "A needlessly drawn-out romance and endless violence make Gautham Menon directed Simbu- starrer Achcham Yenbadhu Madamaiyada a boring watch."

== Release ==
The film was initially titled Sattendru Maaruthu Vaanilai in December 2013. The title refers to lyrics of the song "Nenjukkul Peidhidum", from Menon's 2008 film Vaaranam Aayiram. However, the title could not be retained as the producers K. Ethiraj and Dr. Saravanan completed a different film with the same title which was censored and tax exempted. A fifty-second teaser of Menon's film that was released on 3 February 2014. However, in February 2015, the title was revealed as Achcham Yenbadhu Madamaiyada.

The teaser was released on 29 August 2015. The first trailer was released on 31 December 2015. The film was released on 11 November 2016.

== Accolades ==
64th Filmfare Awards South 2017

- Best Music Director

– A. R. Rahman

- Best Lyricist

– Thamarai (for "Thalli Pogathey")

- Best Female Debut

– Manjima Mohan

IIFA Utsavam

- Best Music Director Award (Tamil)

– A. R. Rahman

6th South Indian International Movie Awards

- Best Music Director Award (Tamil)

– A. R. Rahman

Kollywood Cinema Awards

- Best Music Director Award (Tamil)

– A. R. Rahman

Edison Awards

- Best Actor (2016) (Tamil)

– Silambarasan

== Legacy ==
The song "Thalli Pogathey" was parodied by Rajendran and Kovai Sarala in Anbanavan Asaradhavan Adangadhavan (2017) also starring Silambarasan. In the film Idhu Namma Aalu starring Silambarasan featured the song "Thalli Pogathey" as the Ringtone of the phone for Simbu's character. The line "Yeno Vaanilai Maaruthey" from the song "Thalli Pogathey" inspired a short film of the same name. The song "Thalli Pogathey" inspired a film of the same name. The film Putham Pudhu Kaalai has a segment story called 'Avalum Naanum' directed by Gautham Menon, which is after the song Avalum Naanum.
