= Vaaranam Aayiram =

2008 film by Gautham Vasudev Menon

- Theatrical release poster
- Directed by: Gautham Vasudev Menon
- Written by: Gautham Vasudev Menon
- Produced by: V. Ravichandran
- Starring: Suriya; Simran; Sameera Reddy; Ramya
- Narrated by: Suriya
- Cinematography: R. Rathnavelu
- Edited by: Anthony
- Music by: Harris Jayaraj
- Production company: Aascar Film Pvt. Ltd
- Distributed by: Cloud Nine Movies (worldwide); Bharat Creations (United States)
- Release date: 14 November 2008
- Running time: 170 minutes
- Country: India
- Language: Tamil

Vaaranam Aayiram (transl. Thousand Elephants) is a 2008 Indian Tamil-language drama film written and directed by Gautham Vasudev Menon and produced by V. Ravichandran of Aascar Films. The film stars Suriya in the main dual lead role as father and son alongside Simran, Sameera Reddy (in her Tamil debut) and Ramya. The film features music composed by Harris Jayaraj, making Vaaranam Aayiram his last project with Menon before the formal break-up of their partnership, until they worked together again in Yennai Arindhaal (2015). The cinematography for the film was handled by R. Rathnavelu and the editing was done by Anthony.

The film illustrates Suriya, an Indian Army Major who learns about his father Krishnan's death when he is on a rescue mission. He then starts reminiscing about the bond he shared with Krishnan and the stories related to him. The storyline was inspired by Menon's life, when he heard the news about his father's death back in 2007, also serving as a tribute to him. Filmed across India and the United States, Vaaranam Aayiram had been under production since November 2006 and was completed in August 2008. The film was theatrically released on 14 November 2008, after multiple postponements, and opened to critical acclaim, with praise for Suriya's dual role performance and Harris Jayaraj's soundtrack. Further, the film also became a commercial success, eventually becoming the biggest hit in Suriya's career at that time. It won a number of awards, including the National Film Award for Best Feature Film in Tamil. The film has attained cult status over time and Suriya's performance in the film is now considered to be one of the best in his career.

== Plot ==
An elderly Krishnan returns home from getting a haircut, vomits blood in his bathroom, and passes away. At the same time, his son Suriya, a Major in the Indian Army, is en route to Kashmir on a high-stakes military mission to rescue a journalist kidnapped by terrorists. Upon receiving the news of his father's sudden demise, a grief-stricken Suriya begins to tearfully reminisce about his past and the profound bond they shared.

A flashback reveals a young Krishnan and Malini as students at Madras Christian College in the 1970s. The two fall in love, marry, and have two children, Suriya and Shriya. Growing up, Suriya shares an unconventional, deeply supportive relationship with Krishnan, who acts more like a close friend than a rigid patriarch. Years later, after completing his college examinations in Tiruchirappalli, Suriya meets a young woman named Meghna on a train ride home and falls instantly in love. Although Meghna is skeptical of love at first sight and later reveals she is moving to California to pursue a master's degree, Suriya remains determined to win her affection.

Back home, Krishnan suffers from his first heart attack, brought on by years of chain-smoking. The health crisis forces Suriya to face reality; he realizes he needs to step up and support his family. He co-founds a successful design firm with his friends and performs at local music concerts to generate income. Together, Suriya and Shriya earn enough to build their father's long-desired dream house. Actively encouraged by Krishnan to pursue his happiness, Suriya travels to San Francisco to track down Meghna. Surprised but touched by his devotion, Meghna hosts him, gradually falls in love with him, and ultimately proposes, receiving the enthusiastic blessing of Suriya's family. Tragically, shortly after traveling to Oklahoma City for an academic project, Meghna is killed in a devastating bombing, leaving a shattered Suriya plunged into a deep depression.

Suriya returns to India, briefly finding solace after a chance meeting with an empathetic businessman named Shankar Menon. However, after breaking down while recounting Meghna's final moments to Priya—Shriya's childhood best friend—Suriya suffers a severe emotional relapse and turned to heavy drug and alcohol abuse. Discovering his addiction, Krishnan and Malini lock him in his room to force a painful but necessary detoxification. Once recovered, Malini urges Suriya to embark on a solo journey to rejuvenate his spirit, under the condition that he return home as a changed man. Traveling north, Suriya learns that Shankar Menon's son, Aditya, has been kidnapped in New Delhi. Activating his sense of purpose, Suriya investigates the criminal underworld, tracks down the kidnappers, and single-handedly rescues the boy, earning widespread national praise and restoring his family's pride.

Following his return, Suriya and Priya grow exceptionally close. Priya confesses that she has been secretly in love with him since childhood. While initially hesitant, Suriya finds his feelings shifting after stepping in to protect her from a harasser on a bus. Recognizing that the best path to permanently overcoming his grief is to channel his energy into physical discipline and national service, Suriya joins the Indian Army. Six years later, having risen to the rank of Major at age thirty, he realizes how deeply he missed Priya. He meets her in Dehradun, reciprocates her love, and the two marry and eventually welcome a son. The family's peace is later upended when Krishnan is diagnosed with advanced throat cancer due to his smoking addiction and given less than a year to live. Shortly after, Suriya is called away for the emergency hostage rescue operation, bringing the timeline back to the present.

Suriya successfully completes the military rescue mission in Kashmir and returns home victorious to perform his father's final rites. Together, Malini, Suriya, Priya, and Shriya scatter Krishnan's ashes into the ocean. Malini comforts her son, reminding him that he carries the same resilient spirit as his father, who lived life fully and bravely. Looking back at the shore, Suriya finds comfort in the enduring memory of his father, imagining Krishnan smiling warmly and walking gleefully along the beach.

== Cast ==
- Suriya in a dual role as
  - Krishnan
  - Major K. Suriya
    - Varun as Suriya at 3 years old
    - Hiren as Suriya at 6 years old
    - Sachin as Suriya at 11 years old
- Simran as Malini Krishnan, Krishnan's wife, Suriya's and Shriya's mother (Voiced by Deepa Venkat)
- Sameera Reddy as Meghna, Suriya's girlfriend in the past (Voiced by Chinmayi)
- Ramya as Priya, Shriya's best friend and Suriya's wife
- Deepa Narendran as Shriya Krishnan, Suriya's sister and Krishnan's daughter
  - Laasya as Shriya at 5 years old
- Babloo Prithiveeraj as Azad
- Karthik as Mahesh
- Akanksha Midha as Namradha Dutt
- Jayshree as Aarthi
- Dany as Priya's father
- Indra as Priya's mother
- Deenadalayan as Shankar Dayal Sharma
- Gautham Vasudev Menon as Commando Informer
- Ganesh as Shriya's husband
- Ganesh as Librarian Antony
- Ravi as Dabbu Malik
- Rajeevan as Meghna's father
- Shanker Kolandi as Shankar Menon
- Swetha as Swetha
- Sathish as Sathish
- Veera Bahu as Commando
- Aditya as Aditya
- Amitash as Krishnan's friend

== Production ==
=== Pre-production ===
Director Gautham Vasudev Menon expressed his interest to work with Suriya again after the success of Kaakha Kaakha (2003). In early 2005, the pair got together for a film tentatively titled Chennaiyil Oru Mazhaikaalam which featured Asin in the lead role and Daniel Balaji in a supporting role. However, after a photo shoot, the film was delayed and then subsequently called off, with Menon later going on to direct the Kamal Haasan-starrer Vettaiyaadu Vilaiyaadu and Sarathkumar-starrer Pachaikili Muthucharam. In mid-2006, Menon planned a script for Suriya, which would be produced under his newly launched Photon Film Factory, and he expressed that the film will not be a sequel to Kaakha Kaakha, but a romantic thriller film with titles such as Naan Thaan and Udal Porul Aavi were considered. The film was speculated to be made on a budget of ₹11.5 crore (US$1.2 million), becoming the expensive film of Suriya in that period, and V. Ravichandran of Aascar Films acquired the rights of distribution on a first copy basis. In a turn of events, Menon dropped the idea of producing the film due to budget escalations, and this prompted Ravichandran to acquire the production rights.

=== Development ===
In late November 2006, Menon announced the title of the film as Vaaranam Aayiram, title derived from "Nachiyar Tirumoli" with the literal meaning of "the strength of a thousand elephants". According to Menon, he received the news of his father's death while he was in the United States in 2007, and recounted their shared experiences while returning via flight; this incident inspired him to direct the film which begins in a similar manner. Menon has described the film as "autobiographical and a very personal story and if people didn't know, that 70% of this [the film] is from my life".

=== Casting ===
Menon stated that Suriya would play dual roles of a 21-year-old Suriya and his father Krishnan. Suriya lost weight without using capsules and prepared a six-pack for the film through an eight-month fitness regime. For Surya's father Krishnan's role, Menon initially approached Mohanlal and Nana Patekar, but it did not work out as there was an issue about how they would portray the character's younger age (his twenties) in the flashback scenes, thus Suriya expressed interest in portraying the character himself. Deepika Padukone was first approached for the lead actress role, but she backed out to be part of the Hindi film Om Shanti Om. Soon after, Andrea Jeremiah was confirmed as the heroine after working with the director in Pachaikili Muthucharam, but was dropped from the film for unknown reasons.

The producers then announced the film with Ramya, who was making her comeback to Tamil films, and Genelia D'Souza in the lead roles. Ramya was credited by her real name, Divya Spandana. Soon after the start of the shoot, D'Souza decided to walk out, after Menon refused to pay the hefty salary that she was demanding and receiving in Telugu films, allowing Sameera Reddy to act in her first Tamil film. Simran, who acted alongside Suriya in his debut film Nerrukku Ner (1997), was selected to portray the mother of Suriya, after Tabu had rejected the role. Menon's norm technicians: cinematographer R. Rathnavelu, editor Anthony Gonsalvez, art director Rajeevan and music composer Harris Jayaraj, were part of this film.

=== Filming ===
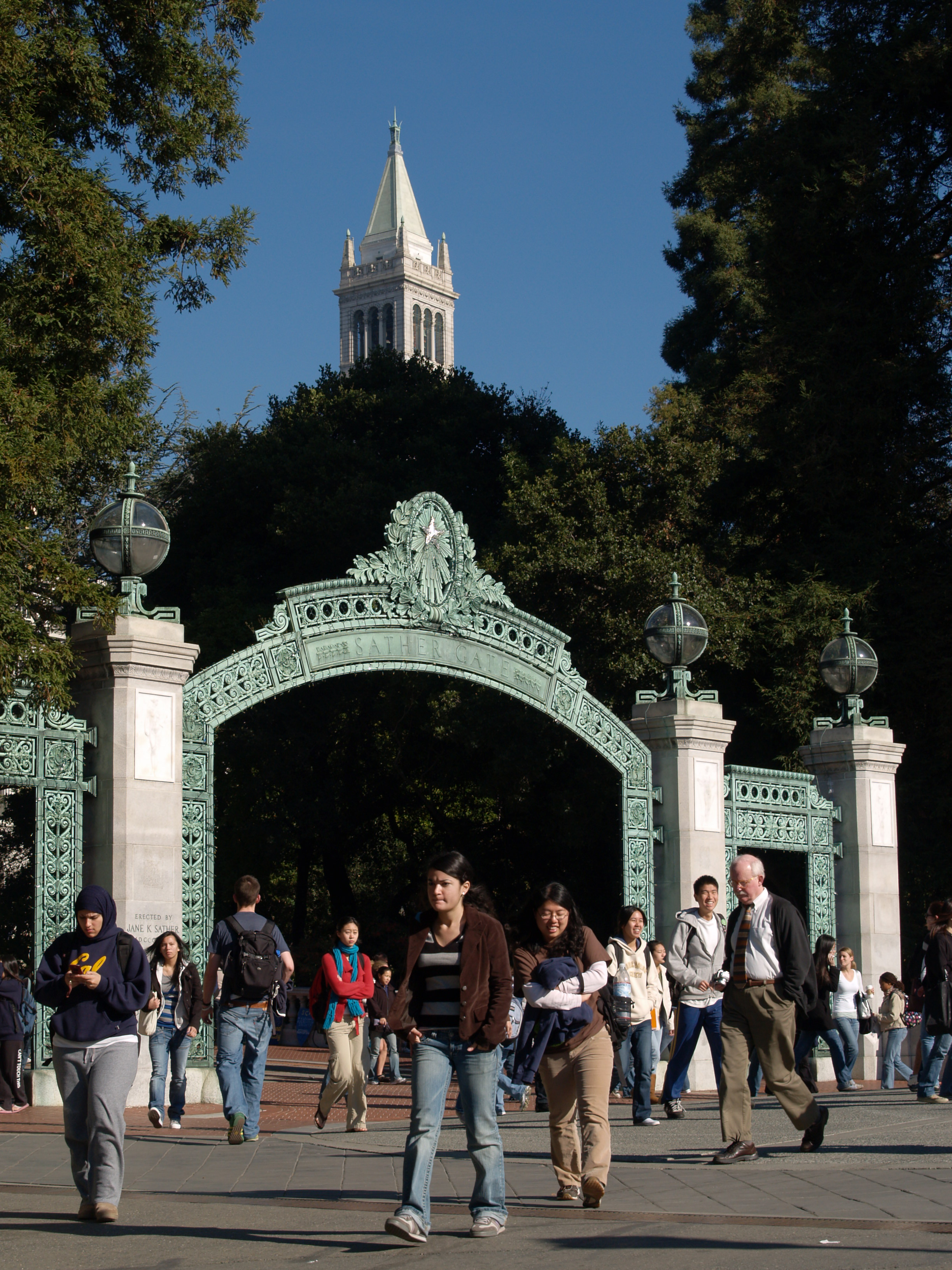
University of California, Berkeley served as shooting spot in "Adiye Kolluthe" song

Principal photography commenced on 24 November 2006 in Chennai. In April 2007, it was announced that a 10-day shoot in Afghanistan would be followed by shooting in Malaysia, Russia and the United States, thus Vaaranam Aayiram was the first Tamil film being shot in Afghanistan. However, the film only completed a shoot at the University of California, Berkeley and shooting was not held in Afghanistan.

In November 2007, when filming in the United States was still ongoing, Menon decided to send the reels back to Chennai. Two of the production managers were assigned the task of bringing the reels to the producer's office; however, the pair decided to stay in Singapore for a couple of days before returning to Chennai. Following their arrival in Chennai, it was discovered that the reels went missing in the hotel they stayed at in Singapore, and a search by the police proved unsuccessful. The whole crew was in a bind as the reels held fight scenes, songs and other scenes worth $500,000 (₹1.5 crore). Soon after, the reels were found with the Singapore airport authorities.

The team later shot few schedules in Chennai during January 2008 and was completed within a month. The team further shot sequences in Kashmir and Delhi, and continued intermittently so that Suriya could work on his commitments for Ayan. Filming ended in August 2008, after one year of production.

== Music ==
The film has seven songs composed by Harris Jayaraj with lyrics written by Thamarai and Na. Muthukumar. The original soundtrack album, distributed by Sony BMG, featured an instrumental track not included in the film. The songs from the albums were released to four leading radio stations in Chennai, with one song per station, in attempt to popularise it five days before the official launch on 24 September 2008, which was the first of its kind in Indian cinema. The album opened to positive response from music critics and audiences and became the most downloaded Tamil album during that time. It became the most played and repeated soundtracks within the arrival of music streaming platforms in the Indian music scene.

== Release ==
Varanam Aayiram was initially scheduled for late 2007 release, but was delayed multiple times due to production troubles. On the occasion of Pongal (14 January 2008), a song trailer of 50-seconds was unveiled and opened to widespread response from fans. As a result, various distributors planned to buy the film for huge bids, with Gemini Film Circuit acquiring the Tamil Nadu theatrical distribution rights. Since, V. Ravichandran prioritised on the release plans for Dasavathaaram scheduled for 14 April 2008 (Tamil New Year's Day), the team planned to release the film on 15 May 2008 and later shifted the release date to 30 May and 6 June. But the producer felt that the business of both the films will be affected due to the inaugural Indian Premier League season happening underway, thus resulting in holding both the releases till 1 June, the date when the tournament ends.

Despite the release of Dasavathaaram on 13 June 2008, Ravichandran and Menon did not comment anything about its release. Trade analysts believed that the collections will be affected if the film being released on June—July period, due to lack of festival dates in that month; adding to the factors of postponement, were the beginning of new academic sessions in mid-June, with the delay in the film's production as the team were able to complete the shooting only in August 2008. The makers preferred for a release on 15 August (Independence Day) and 3 September (Vinayagar Chathurthi), to cash in the holiday season, which did not happen.

The film was postponed further from 25 October 2008 (Diwali weekend) as Gautham Menon later sold the distribution rights from Gemini Film Circuit to Adlabs in order to ensure a wide release. The film released theatrically on 14 November 2008 along with its Telugu-dubbed version titled Surya s/o Krishnan was released simultaneously.

== Reception ==
=== Box office ===
Vaaranam Aayiram collected £81,149 in the United Kingdom after its third weekend which then was approximately equal to ₹60.78 lakh. The film grossed $796,297 from Malaysia and $124,710 from UK in its lifetime.

The Telugu version, Surya S/O Krishnan was re-released in theatres on 4 August 2023. The re-release proved to be highly successful as the film grossed around ₹3 crore in its opening weekend from Andhra Pradesh and Telangana.

=== Critical response ===
Sify stated that it is a "film straight from the heart being optimistic, fresh and emotionally honest". The review further stated "The film demands great patience to sit through and is an overdose of emotions. If the film holds on, it is because of its music and superb performance of Surya." Rediff.com's Pavithra Srinivasan called it a "moving story", further mentioning that "It might be just a feather in Gautam's hat. As for Surya, it's an ostrich plume, a justified triumph." Malathi Rangarajan of The Hindu said, "The same combo came together for Kaakha Kaakha and signed off with a flourish not so long ago! Of course Vaaranam [...] does have some great moments, but it's a lengthy film, and you feel it!" Reviewing the Telugu-dubbed version, Jeevi of Idlebrain.com rated the film two-and-a-half out of five stars and wrote that "On a whole, Surya s/o Krishnan is a film that suffers from too much of realism and slow paced narration".

== Accolades ==
Award (Note: Awards, festivals and organizations are in alphabetical order.)	Date of ceremony (Note: Date is linked to the article about the awards held that year, wherever possible.)	Category	Recipient(s)	Result	Ref.
Ananda Vikatan Cinema Awards	7 January 2009	Best Cinematographer	R. Rathnavelu	Won	
Ananda Vikatan Cinema Awards	7 January 2009	Best Music Director	Harris Jayaraj	Won (Note: Also for Dhaam Dhoom.)	
Ananda Vikatan Cinema Awards	7 January 2009	Best Lyricist	Thamarai	Won	
Ananda Vikatan Cinema Awards	7 January 2009	Best Male Playback Singer	Hariharan – (for song "Nenjukkul Peithidum")	Won	
Filmfare Awards South	31 July 2009	Best Film – Tamil	Vaaranam Aayiram – Aascar Film Pvt. Ltd	Nominated	
Filmfare Awards South	31 July 2009	Best Popular Movie – Tamil	Vaaranam Aayiram – Aascar Film Pvt. Ltd	Won	
Filmfare Awards South	31 July 2009	Best Director – Tamil	Gautham Vasudev Menon	Nominated	
Filmfare Awards South	31 July 2009	Best Actor – Tamil	Suriya	Won	
Filmfare Awards South	31 July 2009	Best Supporting Actress – Tamil	Simran	Won	
Filmfare Awards South	31 July 2009	Best Music Director – Tamil	Harris Jayaraj	Won	
Filmfare Awards South	31 July 2009	Best Lyricist – Tamil	Thamarai – (for song "Nenjukkul Peithidum")	Won	
Filmfare Awards South	31 July 2009	Best Male Playback Singer – Tamil	Naresh Iyer – (for song "Mundhinam Paarthene")	Won	
Filmfare Awards South	31 July 2009	Best Male Playback Singer – Tamil	Hariharan – (for song "Nenjukkul Peithidum")	Nominated	
Meera Isaiaruvi Tamil Music Awards	11 July 2009	Best Art Director	Rajeevan	Won	
Meera Isaiaruvi Tamil Music Awards	11 July 2009	Best Picturisation	R. Rathnavelu	Won	
Meera Isaiaruvi Tamil Music Awards	11 July 2009	Best Music Director	Harris Jayaraj	Won	
Meera Isaiaruvi Tamil Music Awards	11 July 2009	Best Album of the Year	Harris Jayaraj	Won	
Meera Isaiaruvi Tamil Music Awards	11 July 2009	Best Lyricist	Thamarai – (for song "Nenjukkul Peithidum")	Won	
Meera Isaiaruvi Tamil Music Awards	11 July 2009	Best Male Playback Singer	Hariharan – (for song "Nenjukkul Peithidum")	Won	
Meera Isaiaruvi Tamil Music Awards	11 July 2009	Voice of the Year	Karthik – (for song "Ava Enna")	Won	
Meera Isaiaruvi Tamil Music Awards	11 July 2009	Rising Star Singer – Female	Shruti Haasan – (for song "Adiye Kolluthe")	Won	
National Film Awards	20 March 2010	Best Feature Film – Tamil	Producer: V. Ravichandran; Director: Gautham Vasudev Menon	Won	
South Scope Style Awards	25 October 2009	Most Stylish Actor – Tamil	Suriya	Won	
South Scope Style Awards	25 October 2009	Style Youth Icon of the Year	Suriya	Won	
South Scope Style Awards	25 October 2009	Most Stylish Music Director – Tamil	Harris Jayaraj	Won	
Tamil Nadu State Film Awards	28 September 2009	Special Award for Best Actor	Suriya	Won	
Tamil Nadu State Film Awards	28 September 2009	Best Art Director	Rajeevan	Won	
Tamil Nadu State Film Awards	28 September 2009	Best Audiographer	Ravi	Won	
Vijay Awards	13 June 2009	Best Film	Vaaranam Aayiram – Aascar Film Pvt. Ltd	Nominated	
Vijay Awards	13 June 2009	Favourite Film	Vaaranam Aayiram – Aascar Film Pvt. Ltd	Won	
Vijay Awards	13 June 2009	Best Director	Gautham Vasudev Menon	Nominated	
Vijay Awards	13 June 2009	Favourite Director	Gautham Vasudev Menon	Won	
Vijay Awards	13 June 2009	Best Art Director	Rajeevan	Nominated	
Vijay Awards	13 June 2009	Best Cinematographer	R. Rathnavelu	Nominated	
Vijay Awards	13 June 2009	Best Editor	Anthony	Nominated	
Vijay Awards	13 June 2009	Best Actor	Suriya	Won	
Vijay Awards	13 June 2009	Favourite Hero	Suriya	Nominated	
Vijay Awards	13 June 2009	Entertainer of the Year	Suriya	Nominated	
Vijay Awards	13 June 2009	Best Debut Actress	Sameera Reddy	Nominated	
Vijay Awards	13 June 2009	Best Supporting Actress	Simran	Won	
Vijay Awards	13 June 2009	Best Music Director	Harris Jayaraj	Won	
Vijay Awards	13 June 2009	Favourite Song	Harris Jayaraj – (for song "Ava Enna")	Won	
Vijay Awards	13 June 2009	Best Lyricist	Thamarai – (for song "Nenjukkul Peithidum")	Won	
Vijay Awards	13 June 2009	Best Male Playback Singer	Hariharan – (for song "Nenjukkul Peithidum")	Won	
Vijay Awards	13 June 2009	Best Female Playback Singer	Sudha Ragunathan – (for song "Annul Mele Panithuli")	Nominated	
Vijay Awards	13 June 2009	Best Choreographer	Brinda – (for song "Ava Enna")	Nominated	
Vijay Awards	13 June 2009	Best Make Up Artistes	Yogesh & Banu	Won	

== Legacy ==
Suriya's six-pack look and his workout montage scene in the film became iconic among the Tamil and South Indian youth at the time, with many even today citing them as their inspiration to take up fitness and an active lifestyle seriously. Many young Tamil actors have since essayed the six-pack look onscreen at least once, after the film popularized it. Suriya himself would sport it for a number of films since, and the term would become synonymous with him.

The song "Mundhinam Paarthene" inspired a 2010 romantic film of the same name. In the film Murattu Kaalai (2012), the veterinarian (Cell Murugan) sings "Oh Shanti" as he falls in love with Saroja (Vivek), whom he lovingly calls Mayil. In the film Idharkuthane Aasaipattai Balakumara (2013), Baby (Jangiri Madhumitha) has the song "Mundhinam Paarthene" as her ringtone. In Tamizh Padam 2, Shiva (Shiva) tries to go to America to win his girlfriend Ramya (Iswarya Menon) back, similar to how Suriya went to America to impress Meghna. In Master (2021), the character JD (Vijay) references dialogues from Vaaranam Aayiram as he tries to fool someone into believing that he once travelled to America to express his love for a girl. The 21st episode of the Telugu television series Brahmamudi features the song "Nalone Pongenu" (Telugu version of "Nenjukkul Peidhidum"). The title of the 2022 Indian film Anel Meley Pani Thuli was derived from the song of the same name. The lead roles in the Telugu film Ustaad (2023) were named Suriya and Meghana after the actor and character of Vaaranam Aayiram, respectively. The lyric "Sattendru Maarudhu Vaanilai" from the song "Nenjukkul Peidhidum" inspired a 2026 film.
