= Filmfare Award for Best Lyricist – Tamil =

Indian annual film award

The Filmfare Award for Best Lyricist – Tamil is given by the Filmfare magazine as part of its annual Filmfare Awards for Tamil films.

The award was first given in 2005.

== Superlatives ==
Superlative	Lyricist	Record
Most wins	Na. Muthukumar	4
Most wins	Thamarai	4
Most consecutive wins	Na Muthukumar	2
Most nominations without a win	Vivek	5
Most consecutive nominations	Na Muthukumar	10
Most consecutive nominations	Madhan Karky	10
Oldest winner	Vairamuthu	65
Youngest winner	Na Muthukumar	31
Youngest nominee	Na Muthukumar	31
Youngest nominee	Vivek	31
Youngest nominee	Vignesh Shivan	31
Oldest nominee	Vaali	78

== Multiple wins ==
- 4 wins: Na Muthukumar, Thamarai
- 3 wins: Vairamuthu

== Multiple nominations ==
- 12 nominations: Vairamuthu
- 11 nominations: Na Muthukumar
- 10 nominations: Madhan Karky
- 9 nominations: Thamarai
- 6 nominations: Vivek
- 3 nominations: Yugabharathi, Karthik Netha
- 2 nominations: Pa. Vijay, Kabilan, Vignesh Shivan

== Winners ==
This is the complete list of award winners and the films for which they won.

Year	Lyricist	Film	Song
2024	Uma Devi K	Meiyazhagan	"Yaaro Ivan Yaaro"
2023	Ilango Krishnan	Ponniyin Selvan: II	"Aga Naga"
2022	Thamarai	Vendhu Thanindhathu Kaadu	Marakuma Nenjam
2020–2021	Arivu	Sarpatta Parambarai	Neeye Oli
2019	AWARDS FUNCTION WAS SUSPENDED DUE TO COVID-19 PANDEMIC		
2018	Karthik Netha	96	Kaadhalae
2017	Vairamuthu	Kaatru Veliyidai	Vaan Varuvaan
2016	Thamarai	Achcham Yenbadhu Madamaiyada	Thalli pogathey
2015	Madhan Karky	I	"Pookale Sattru"
2014	Na. Muthukumar	Saivam	Azhagu
2013	Na. Muthukumar	Thanga Meenkal	Aanandha Yaazhai
2012	Yugabharathi	Kumki	Solitaaley
2011	Vairamuthu	Vaagai Sooda Vaa	Sara Sara Saarakaathu
2010	Thamarai	Vinnaithaandi Varuvaayaa	Mannipaaya
2009	Na. Muthukumar	Ayan	Vizhi Moodi
2008	Thamarai	Vaaranam Aayiram	Nenjukkul Peithidum
2007	Pa. Vijay	Unnale Unnale	Unnale Unnale
2006	Na. Muthukumar	Veyil	Urugudhe Maragudhe
2005	Vairamuthu	Anniyan	Oh Sukumari

== Nominations ==
2008: Thamarai – "Nenjukkul Peithidum" – Vaaranam Aayiram

- Na. Muthukumar – "Mudhal Mazhai" – Bheema
- Thamarai – "Kangal Irandal" – Subramaniapuram
- Vaali – "Kallai Mattum" – Dasavathaaram
- Vairamuthu – "Vaa Vaa" – Abhiyum Naanum

2009: Na. Muthukumar – "Vizhi Moodi" – Ayan

- Ilaiyaraaja – "Piychai Paathiram" – Naan Kadavul
- Kabilan – "Karikaalan" – Vettaikaaran
- Thamarai – "Oru Vetkam" – Pasanga
- Vairamuthu – "Nenje Nenje" – Ayan
- Viveka – "Chinna Thamarai" – Vettaikaaran

2010: Thamarai – "Mannipaaya" – Vinnaithaandi Varuvaayaa

- Na. Muthukumar – "Aval Apaadi" – Angadi Theru
- Na. Muthukumar – "Vamma Duraiyamma" – Madrasapattinam
- Vairamuthu – "Kadhal Anukal" – Enthiran
- Vairamuthu – "Usure Pogudhey" – Raavanan

2011: Vairamuthu – "Saara Saara" – Vaagai Sooda Vaa

- Madhan Karky – "Nee Korinaal" – Nootrenbadhu
- Na. Muthukumar – "Mun Andhi" – 7 Aum Arivu
- Na. Muthukumar – "Vizhigalil Oru" – Deiva Thirumagal
- Thamarai – "Engeyum Kadhal" – Engeyum Kadhal

2012: Yugabharathi – "Solitaley" – Kumki

- Madhan Karky – "Veesum" – Naan Ee
- Madhan Karky – "Google Google" – Thuppakki
- Na. Muthukumar – "Kaatrai Konjam" – Neethane En Ponvasantham
- Vairamuthu – "Para Para" – Neerparavai

2013: Na. Muthukumar – "Anandha Yaazhai" – Thanga Meengal

- Madhan Karky – "Anbin Vaasale" – Kadal
- Na. Muthukumar – "Yaaro Ivan" – Udhayam NH4
- Vairamuthu – "Chithirai Nila" – Kadal
- Vairamuthu – "Sengaade" – Paradesi

2014: Na. Muthukumar – "Azhagu" – Saivam

- Madhan Karky – "Selfie Pulla" – Kaththi
- Pa. Vijay – "Yaarumilla" – Kaaviya Thalaivan
- Vairamuthu – "Ovvondrai Thirudigarai" – Jeeva
- Yugabharathi – "Manasula Soora Kaathu" – Cuckoo

2015: Madhan Karky – "Pookale satru" – I

- Kabilan – "Ennidu Nee Irundhal" – I
- Thamarai – "Unakenna Venum Sollu" – Yennai Arindhaal
- Vignesh Shivan – "Thangamey" – Naanum Rowdy Dhaan
- Vivek – "Vaadi Rasatthi" – 36 Vayadhinile

2016: Thamarai – "Thalli Pogathey" – Achcham Yenbadhu Madamaiyada

- Arunraja Kamaraj – "Nerupudaa" – Kabali
- Madhan Karky – "Naan un azhaginile" – 24
- Vairamuthu – "Endha pakkam" – Dharmadurai
- Vivek – "En Suzhali" – Kodi

2017: Vairamuthu – "Vaan Varuvaan" – Kaatru Veliyidai

- Madhan Karky – "Azhagiye" – Kaatru Veliyidai
- Madhan Karky – "Idhayame" – Velaikkaran
- Vivek – "Aazhaporaan Tamizhan" – Mersal
- Vivek – "Neethane" – Mersal

2018: Karthik Netha – "Kaadhalae" – 96

- GKB – "Vaayadi Petthapulla" – Kanaa
- Madhan Karky – "Kurumba" – Tik Tik Tik
- Vignesh Shivan – "Sodakku" – Thaana Serndha Kootam
- Vivek – "Pottakati Poovasam" Pariyerum Perumal

2020–2021: Arivu – "Neeye Oli" – Sarpatta Parambarai

- Karthik Netha – "Idhuvum Kadandhu Pogum" – Netrikann
- Ko Sesha – "Kadhaippoma" – Oh My Kadavule
- Thamarai – "Yaar Azhaippadhu" – Maara
- Uma Devi – "Aarariro" – Kadaseela Biriyani
- Yugabharathi – "Kaiyilea Aagasam" – Soorarai Pottru

2022: Thamarai – "Marakuma Nenjam" – Vendhu Thanindhathu Kaadu

- Dhanush – "Megham Karukkatha" – Thiruchitrambalam
- Ilango Krishnan – "Devaralan Attam" – Ponniyin Selvan: I
- Ilango Krishnan – "Ponni Nadhi" – Ponniyin Selvan: I
- Madhan Karky – "Maayava Thooyava" – Iravin Nizhal
- Vishnu Edavan – "Porkanda Singam" – Vikram

2023: Ilango Krishnan – "Aga Naga" – Ponniyin Selvan: II

- Ilango Krishnan – "Veera Raja Veera" – Ponniyin Selvan: II
- Krithika Nelson – "Oru Vezham" – Nitham Oru Vaanam
- Ku Karthik – "Nira" – Takkar
- Suka – "Onnoda Nadandhaa" – Viduthalai Part 1

2024: Uma Devi K – "Yaaro Ivan Yaaro" – Meiyazhagan

- Karthik Netha – "Hey Minnale" – Amaran
- Mohan Rajan – "Aasa Orave" – Lubber Pandhu
- Vivek – "Uyirey" – Amaran
