= Filmfare Award for Best Music Director – Tamil =

Indian annual film award

The Filmfare Award for Best Music Director – Tamil is given to film composers by the Filmfare magazine as part of its annual Filmfare Awards South for Tamil (Kollywood) films. A. R. Rahman has won the award a record 17 times, which includes nine consecutive wins between 1992 and 2000. Harris Jayaraj follows A. R. Rahman with five wins.

== Superlatives ==
Superlative	Music Director	Record
Most wins	A. R. Rahman	17

Multiple wins:

- 17 wins: A. R. Rahman
- 5 wins: Harris Jayaraj
- 3 wins: G. V. Prakash Kumar
- 2 wins: Bharadwaj

== Winners ==
Year	Music Director	Film	Ref
2024	G. V. Prakash Kumar	Amaran	
2023	Dhibu Ninan Thomas	Chithha	
2023	Santhosh Narayanan	Chithha	
2022	A. R. Rahman	Ponniyin Selvan: I	
2020–2021	G. V. Prakash Kumar	Soorarai Pottru	
2019	AWARDS FUNCTION WAS SUSPENDED DUE TO COVID-19 PANDEMIC		
2018	Govind Vasantha	96	
2017	A. R. Rahman	Mersal	
2016	A. R. Rahman	Achcham Yenbadhu Madamaiyada	
2015	A. R. Rahman	I	
2014	Anirudh Ravichander	Velaiyilla Pattathari	
2013	A. R. Rahman	Kadal	
2012	D. Imman	Kumki	
2011	G. V. Prakash Kumar	Aadukalam	
2010	A. R. Rahman	Vinnaithaandi Varuvaayaa	
2009	Harris Jayaraj	Ayan	
2008	Harris Jayaraj	Vaaranam Aayiram	
2007	A. R. Rahman	Sivaji	
2006	A. R. Rahman	Sillunu Oru Kaadhal	
2005	Harris Jayaraj	Anniyan	
2004	Bharadwaj	Autograph	
2004	Yuvan Shankar Raja	7G Rainbow Colony	
2003	Harris Jayaraj	Kaakha Kaakha	
2002	Bharadwaj	Gemini	
2001	Harris Jayaraj	Minnale	
2000	A. R. Rahman	Alai Payuthey	
1999	A. R. Rahman	Mudhalvan	
1998	A. R. Rahman	Jeans	
1997	A. R. Rahman	Minsara Kanavu	
1996	A. R. Rahman	Kadhal Desam	
1995	A. R. Rahman	Bombay	
1994	A. R. Rahman	Kaadhalan	
1993	A. R. Rahman	Gentleman	
1992	A. R. Rahman	Roja	
1991	Ilaiyaraaja	Thalapathi	
1990	S. A. Rajkumar	Pudhu Vasantham	

== Nominations ==
=== 2000s ===
- 2001 Harris Jayaraj for Minnale
  - Ilayaraja – Kasi
  - S. A. Rajkumar – Aanandham
- 2003 Harris Jayaraj for Kaakha Kaakha
  - A. R. Rahman – Boys
  - Harris Jayaraj – Saamy
  - Ilayaraja – Pithamagan
  - Vidhyasagar – Dhool
- 2007 A. R. Rahman for Sivaji
  - A. R. Rahman – Azhagiya Tamil Magan
  - Harris Jayaraj – Unnale Unnale
  - Vijay Antony – Naan Avanillai
  - Yuvan Shankar Raja – Paruthiveeran
- 2008 Harris Jayaraj – Vaaranam Aayiram
  - A. R. Rahman – Sakkarakatti
  - James Vasanthan – Subramaniyapuram
  - Vijay Antony – Kadhalil Vizhunthen
  - Yuvan Shankar Raja – Yaaradi Nee Mohini
- 2009 Harris Jayaraj – Ayan
  - Devi Sri Prasad – Kanthaswamy
  - Devi Sri Prasad – Villu
  - Harris Jayaraj – Aadhavan
  - Vidyasagar – Kanden Kadhalai

=== 2010s ===
- 2010 A. R. Rahman – Vinnaithaandi Varuvaayaa
  - A. R. Rahman – Enthiran
  - G. V. Prakash Kumar – Aayirathil Oruvan
  - G. V. Prakash Kumar – Madarasapattinam
  - Yuvan Shankar Raja – Naan Mahan Alla
  - Yuvan Shankar Raja – Paiyaa
- 2011 G. V. Prakash Kumar – Aadukalam
  - G. V. Prakash Kumar – Deiva Thirumagal
  - Ghibran – Vaagai Sooda Vaa
  - Harris Jayaraj – 7 Aum Arivu
  - Harris Jayaraj – Ko
- 2012 D. Imman – Kumki
  - Anirudh Ravichander – 3
  - G. V. Prakash Kumar – Thandavam
  - Harris Jayaraj – Thuppakki
  - Ilaiyaraaja – Neethane En Ponvasantham
- 2013 – A. R. Rahman – Kadal
  - A. R. Rahman – Maryan
  - Anirudh Ravichander – Ethir Neechal
  - Anirudh Ravichander – Vanakkam Chennai
  - D. Imman – Varuthapadatha Valibar Sangam
  - G. V. Prakash Kumar – Paradesi
- 2014 – Anirudh Ravichander – Velaiyilla Pattathari
  - A. R. Rahman – Kaaviya Thalaivan
  - Anirudh Ravichander – Kaththi
  - Anirudh Ravichander – Maan Karate
  - Santhosh Narayanan – Madras
- 2015 – A. R. Rahman – I
  - A. R. Rahman – OK Kanmani
  - Anirudh Ravichander – Maari
  - Anirudh Ravichander – Naanum Rowdy Dhaan
  - Harris Jayaraj – Yennai Arindhaal
- 2016 – A. R. Rahman – Achcham Yenbadhu Madamaiyada
  - A. R. Rahman – 24
  - Anirudh Ravichander – Remo
  - G. V. Prakash Kumar – Theri
  - Harris Jayaraj – Iru Mugan
  - Santhosh Narayanan – Kabali
- 2017 – A. R. Rahman – Mersal
  - A. R. Rahman – Kaatru Veliyidai
  - Anirudh Ravichander – Velaikkaran
  - Anirudh Ravichander – Vivegam
  - D. Imman – Bogan
- 2018 – Govind Vasantha – 96
  - A. R. Rahman – Chekka Chivantha Vaanam
  - Anirudh Ravichander – Kolamavu Kokila
  - Santhosh Narayanan – Pariyerum Perumal
  - Yuvan Shankar Raja – Pyaar Prema Kaadhal
- 2020–2021 – G. V. Prakash Kumar – Soorarai Pottru
  - Anirudh Ravichander – Darbar
  - Anirudh Ravichander – Doctor
  - Anirudh Ravichander – Master
  - D. Imman – Annaatthe
  - Leon James – Oh My Kadavule
- 2022 – A. R. Rahman – Ponniyin Selvan: I
  - A. R. Rahman – Vendhu Thanindhathu Kaadu
  - Anirudh Ravichander – Vikram
  - Anirudh Ravichander – Thiruchitrambalam
  - Anirudh Ravichander – Beast
  - Yuvan Shankar Raja – Love Today
- 2023 – Dhibu Ninan Thomas, Santhosh Narayanan – Chiththa
  - Anirudh Ravichander – Jailer
  - Anirudh Ravichander – Leo
  - A. R. Rahman – Ponniyin Selvan: II
  - Ilaiyaraaja – Part 1
  - G. V. Prakash Kumar – Vaathi
- 2024 – G. V. Prakash Kumar – Amaran
  - A. R. Rahman – Raayan
  - Anirudh Ravichander – Vettaiyan
  - Santhosh Narayanan – Vaazhai
  - Sean Roldan – Lubber Pandhu
