= Judo Rathnam =

Indian actor and choreographer (1930–2023)

Kalaimamani Judo Rathnam
- Born: K. K. Rathnam; 8 August 1930; Gudiyatham, North Arcot District, Madras Presidency, British India (now in Vellore district, Tamil Nadu, India)
- Died: 26 January 2023 (aged 92); Gudiyatham, Vellore district, Tamil Nadu, India
- Other names: Kalaichelvan, Rudhranagam
- Occupations: Actor; action choreographer; stunt coordinator
- Years active: 1959–2023
- Spouse: Govindammal

K. K. Rathnam (8 August 1930 – 26 January 2023), known as Judo Rathnam, was an Indian action choreographer. He made his debut as an actor in the film Thamarai Kulam in 1959, and later made his debut as a stunt master in the film Vallavan Oruvan in 1966. He made his last appearance as an actor before retirement in the film Thalainagaram in 2006. Stunt masters and actors such as Vikram Dharma, Super Subbarayan, Thalapathy Dinesh, Jaguar Thangam, Rocky Rajesh, Rambo Rajkumar, FEFSI Vijayan, Stun Siva, Ponnambalam, Judo. K. K. Ramu, Indian Baskar, Rajasekhar, Ambur. R. S. Babu, M. Shahul Hameed, Kundrathur Babu, Azhagu & Vengal Rao have worked as fighters and assistants to him. His son Judo. K. K. Ramu is also a stunt master, while his grandsons Judo Lenin and John Prince are stunt artists.

Rathnam died on 26 January 2023, at age 92.

== Early life and career ==
Rathnam was born in Gudiyattam. From his early childhood, he was attracted towards bodybuilding, yoga and silambam. He won gold medal in bodybuilding and silver cup in boxing which led Rathnam to receive opportunities in films as a stuntman. Mugavai Rajamanikkam took him to Chennai and introduced him to Muktha Srinivasan who gave him an opportunity for playing a stuntman in his film Thamarai Kulam. He was given the name Judo Rathnam by A. Kareem at Tamil Art Literature Conference.

== Filmography ==
- 1966 Vallavan Oruvan
- 1966 Iru Vallavargal
- 1967 Madi Veettu Mappillai
- 1967 Ethirigal Jakkirathai
- 1967 Kadhalithal Podhuma
- 1968 Thanga Valayal
- 1968 Muthu Chippi
- 1968 Deiveega Uravu
- 1969 Thulabaram
- 1970 Dharisanam
- 1971 Thanga Gopuram
- 1971 Signal Man Siddappa (Kannada)
- 1971 Nammaka Drohulu (Telugu)
- 1972 Bathilukku Bathil
- 1972 Kasethan Kadavulada
- 1973 Puttinillu Mettinillu (Telugu)
- 1973 Sahadharmini (Kannada)
- 1973 Bidugade (Kannada)
- 1974 Nomu (Telugu)
- 1975 Mayura (Kannada)
- 1975 Hotel Sorgam
- 1975 Pooja (Telugu)
- 1976 Jeevana Jyothi (Hindi)
- 1977 Gaayathri
- 1977 Devare Dikku (Kannada)
- 1977 Thayigintha Devarilla (Kannada)
- 1977 Nallathukku Kaalamillai
- 1978 Mela Thalangal
- 1978 Maathu Tappada Maga (Kannada)
- 1979 Pancha Kalyani
- 1979 Suddhikalasam (Malayalam)
- 1980 Murattu Kaalai
- 1980 Othaiyadi Pathaiyile
- 1981 Netrikkann
- 1981 Nenjil Oru Mul
- 1981 Raktham (Malayalam)
- 1981 Sivappu Malli
- 1982 Pokkiri Raja
- 1982 Sagalakala Vallavan
- 1982 Chinnan Chirusugal
- 1982 Theeratha Vilayattu Pillai
- 1982 Kanne Radha
- 1982 Puthukavithai
- 1982 Sindoora Sandhyakku Mounam (Malayalam)
- 1982 Pakkathu Veetu Roja
- 1982 Enkeyo Ketta Kural
- 1982 Theerpugal Thiruththapadalam
- 1982 Anandha Ragam
- 1983 Uruvangal Maralam
- 1983 Malaiyoor Mambattiyan
- 1983 Oru Kai Parppom
- 1983 Coolie (Malayalam)
- 1983 Paayum Puli
- 1983 Thangaikkor Geetham
- 1983 Uyirullavarai Usha
- 1983 Thudikkum Karangal
- 1983 Puthisali Paithiyangal
- 1983 Naan Soottiya Malar
- 1983 Sivappu Sooriyan
- 1983 Mundhanai Mudichu
- 1983 Valartha Kada
- 1983 Thoongadhey Thambi Thoongadhey
- 1983 Kairasikkaran
- 1983 Soorakottai Singakutti
- 1983 Adutha Varisu
- 1984 Madurai Sooran
- 1984 Naan Mahaan Alla
- 1984 Thambikku Entha Ooru
- 1984 Sabash
- 1984 Magudi
- 1984 Insaaf Kaun Karega (Hindi)
- 1984 Poochakkoru Mookkuthi (Malayalam)
- 1984 Itha Innu Muthal (Malayalam)
- 1984 Mainakam (Malayalam)
- 1984 Thiruppam
- 1984 Nerupukkul Eeram
- 1984 Neengal Kettavai
- 1984 Niyayam
- 1984 Vellai Pura Ondru
- 1984 Neram Nalla Neram
- 1984 Kai Kodukkum Kai
- 1984 Iru Medhaigal
- 1984 Udhandudu (Telugu)
- 1984 Mudivalla Arambam
- 1984 Nallavanukku Nallavan
- 1984 Rajathanthiram
- 1984 Naanayam Illatha Naanayam as Kalan
- 1985 Padikkadavan
- 1985 Oru Kaidhiyin Diary
- 1985 Avan
- 1985 Veettukkari
- 1985 Ketti Melam
- 1985 Mappillai Singam
- 1985 America Alludu (Telugu)
- 1985 Ragasiyam
- 1985 Nermai
- 1985 Partha Gnabagam Illayo
- 1985 Yaar?
- 1985 Oru Malarin Payanam
- 1985 Puthiya Sagaptham
- 1985 Eetti
- 1985 Wafadaar (Hindi)
- 1985 Deivapiravi
- 1985 Raja Yuvaraja
- 1985 Paadum Vaam Paadi
- 1985 Urimai
- 1985 Vetrikkani
- 1985 Ilamai
- 1985 Sigappu Kili
- 1985 Thalaimagan
- 1985 Uyarndha Ullam
- 1985 Mangamma Sabadham
- 1985 Nalla Thambi
- 1985 Mookkanan Kayiru
- 1985 Unnai Thedi Varuven
- 1985 Ketti Melam
- 1985 Arthamulla Aasaigal
- 1985 Chinna Veedu
- 1986 Engal Thaaikkulame Varuga
- 1986 Prathidwani (Telugu)
- 1986 Dharma Devathai
- 1986 Mr. Bharath
- 1986 Maruthi (Telugu)
- 1986 Deshoddharakudu (Telugu)
- 1986 Manchi Manasulu (Telugu)
- 1986 Kulirkaala Megangal
- 1986 Kaalamellam Un Madiyil
- 1986 Murattu Karangal
- 1986 Shanthi Nivasam (Telugu)
- 1986 Kadaikkan Parvai
- 1986 Brahmastram (Telugu)
- 1986 Mounam Kalaikirathu
- 1986 Naanum Oru Thozhilali
- 1986 Jeevanadhi
- 1986 Viduthalai
- 1987 Manithan
- 1987 Cooliekkaran
- 1987 Shankar Guru
- 1987 Chinnari Devatha (Telugu)
- 1987 Veera Pratap (Telugu)
- 1987 Anjatha Singam
- 1987 Majaal (Hindi)
- 1987 Enga Chinna Rasa
- 1987 Per Sollum Pillai
- 1987 President Gari Abbai (Telugu)
- 1987 Marana Sasanam (Telugu)
- 1988 Guru Sishyan
- 1988 Paatti Sollai Thattathe
- 1988 Idhu Namma Aalu
- 1988 Senthoora Poove
- 1988 Vasanthi
- 1988 Chinnodu Peddodu (Telugu)
- 1988 Dharmathin Thalaivan
- 1988 Irandil Ondru
- 1988 Manamagale Vaa
- 1988 Kazhugumalai Kallan
- 1989 Meenakshi Thiruvilayadal
- 1989 Dravidan
- 1989 Raja Chinna Roja
- 1989 Sonthakkaran
- 1989 Poola Rangadu (Telugu)
- 1989 Dilly Babu
- 1989 Bamma Mata Bangaru Baata (Telugu)
- 1989 Dharma Devan
- 1989 Gair Kanooni (Hindi)
- 1989 Vaai Kozhuppu
- 1989 En Rathathin Rathame
- 1990 Ulagam Pirandhadhu Enakkaga
- 1990 Amma Pillai
- 1990 Athisaya Piravi
- 1990 Pengal Veettin Kangal
- 1990 Jeevan Ek Sanghursh (Hindi)
- 1990 Pudhu Varisu
- 1990 Parampara (Malayalam)
- 1990 Puttinti Pattu Cheera (Telugu)
- 1990 Idem Pellam Baboi (Telugu)
- 1990 Engitta Mothathay
- 1990 En Kadhal Kanmani
- 1990 Guru Sishyulu (Telugu)
- 1990 Pudhu Pudhu Ragangal
- 1990 Aatha Naan Pass Ayittaen
- 1991 Nenjamundu Nermaiundu
- 1991 Niyantha (Telugu)
- 1991 Sarpayagam (Telugu)
- 1992 Sakalakala Vandugal
- 1992 Kaaval Geetham
- 1992 Therku Theru Machan
- 1992 Mudhal Kural
- 1992 Pandiyan
- 1994 Prema & Co (Telugu)
- 1995 Orey Rikshaw (Telugu)
- 1997 Rowdy Durbar (Telugu)
- 2014 Bonku Babu (Bengali)
- 2018 Aschhe Abar Shabor (Bengali)

== Actor ==
- 1959 Thamarai Kulam
- 1963 Konjum Kumari
- 2006 Thalainagaram

== Producer ==
- 1980 Othayadi Paathayilae

== Awards and honours ==
- 2013 Guinness Book of Records - Guinness World Record for working in more than 1200 films as a stunt coordinator.
- 2016 Sankaradas Swamigal Award.
- 2019 Kalaimamani Awards from the Government of Tamil Nadu.
