= Super Subbarayan =

Indian action choreographer and actor

- Born: P. Subbarayan; Tamil Nadu, India
- Other name: Super Fight Subbarayan
- Occupations: Action choreographer; stunt co-ordinator
- Years active: 1980–present

Super Subbarayan (born as P. Subbarayan) is a stunt co-ordinator and actor in the Indian cinema, mainly in Tamil, Kannada, Telugu and Malayalam. He has been working in the industry since 1980. Stunt masters and actors like Rocky Rajesh, Thalapathy Dinesh, Ponnambalam, Ram Laxman, Kundrathur Babu, Indian Baskar, Rajasekhar, Dhilip Subbarayan, Thavasiraj, and Dinesh Subbarayan have worked as fighters and assistants to him. His sons, Dhilip Subbarayan and Dinesh Subbarayan, are also leading stunt masters. He has won four Tamil Nadu State Film Award for Best Stunt Coordinator.

== Filmography ==
- 1983 Manaivi Solle Manthiram
- 1983 Seerum Singangal
- 1984 Kuva Kuva Vaathugal
- 1984 Nooravathu Naal
- 1984 Maman Machan
- 1984 Nandri
- 1984 Vengaiyin Mainthan
- 1984 Pudhiavan
- 1984 Kuzhandhai Yesu
- 1984 Raja Veettu Kannukkutty
- 1984 Naalai Unathu Naal
- 1984 Nirabarathi
- 1984 January 1
- 1984 Unga Veettu Pillai
- 1984 Ingeyum Oru Gangai
- 1984 Uravai Kaatha Kili
- 1984 24 Mani Neram
- 1984 Sattathai Thiruthungal
- 1984 Nyayam Ketkiren
- 1984 Komberi Mookan
- 1984 Pei Veedu
- 1984 Vai Pandal
- 1984 Unga Veettu Pillai
- 1984 Enakkul Oruvan
- 1984 Osai
- 1985 Thiramai
- 1985 Alai Osai
- 1985 Sigappu Nila
- 1985 Marudhani
- 1985 Thandanai
- 1985 Engal Kural
- 1985 Chain Jayapal
- 1985 Amudha Gaanam
- 1985 Anbin Mugavari
- 1985 Terror (Telugu)
- 1985 Uthami
- 1985 Santhosha Kanavukal
- 1985 Kanni Rasi
- 1985 Pagal Nilavu
- 1985 Viswanathan Velai Vendum
- 1985 Naan Ungal Rasigan
- 1985 Naagam
- 1985 Unakkaga Oru Roja
- 1985 Jeevana Chakra (Kannada)
- 1985 Pillai Nila
- 1985 Japanil Kalyanaraman
- 1985 Kaakki Sattai
- 1985 Andha Oru Nimidam
- 1985 Naan Ungal Rasigan
- 1985 Neethiyin Marupakkam
- 1985 Aan Paavam
- 1985 Marudhani
- 1986 Vikram
- 1986 Paaru Paaru Pattanam Paaru
- 1986 Karimedu Karuvayan
- 1986 Nilave Malare
- 1986 Vidinja Kalyanam
- 1986 Brahma Rudrulu (Telugu)
- 1986 Bhale Mithrulu (Telugu)
- 1986 Palaivana Rojakkal
- 1986 Muthal Vasantham
- 1986 Manakanakku
- 1986 Kanne Kaniyamuthe
- 1986 Khaidi Rudraiah (Telugu)
- 1986 Kovil Yaanai
- 1986 Enakku Naaney Needhibathi
- 1986 En Sabadham
- 1986 Rasigan Oru Rasigai
- 1986 Vasantha Raagam
- 1986 Kaliyuga Krishnudu (Telugu)
- 1986 Mythili Ennai Kaathali
- 1986 Anasuyamma Gari Alludu (Telugu)
- 1986 Oomai Vizhigal
- 1986 Kathanayaka (Kannada)
- 1986 Mouna Raagam
- 1986 Oru Iniya Udhayam
- 1986 Naa Pilupe Prabhanjanam (Telugu)
- 1986 Karna (Kannada)
- 1986 Thazhuvatha Kaigal
- 1986 Manthira Punnagai
- 1987 Chinna Thambi Periya Thambi
- 1987 Sirai Paravai
- 1987 Kirayi Dada (Telugu)
- 1987 Kadhal Parisu
- 1987 Velaikkaran
- 1987 Makkal En Pakkam
- 1987 Oru Thayin Sabhatham
- 1987 Bhanumati Gari Mogudu (Telugu)
- 1987 Theertha Karaiyinile
- 1987 Valaiyal Satham
- 1987 Thangachi
- 1987 Marana Homam (Telugu)
- 1987 Kalyana Kacheri
- 1987 Jallikattu
- 1987 Nayakan
- 1987 Ninaive Oru Sangeetham
- 1987 Karthika Pournami (Telugu)
- 1987 Uzhavan Magan
- 1987 Ini Oru Sudhanthiram
- 1987 Neethikku Thandanai
- 1987 Manaivi Ready
- 1987 Sattam Oru Vilayaattu
- 1987 Enga Veettu Ramayanam
- 1987 Parisam Pottachu
- 1987 Aayusu Nooru
- 1988 Oorai Therinjikitten
- 1988 Ullathil Nalla Ullam
- 1988 Therkathi Kallan
- 1988 Paadatha Thenikkal
- 1988 Paasa Paravaigal
- 1988 Nanna Avesha (Kannada)
- 1988 Thaai Paasam
- 1988 Poonthotta Kaavalkaaran
- 1988 Nallavan
- 1988 Jadikketha Moodi
- 1988 Poovum Puyalum
- 1988 Sudhanthira Naattin Adimaigal
- 1988 Tiragabadda Telugubidda (Telugu)
- 1988 Uzhaithu Vaazha Vendum
- 1988 Thenpandi Seemaiyile
- 1988 Dorakani Donga (Telugu)
- 1988 Ithu Engal Neethi
- 1988 Brahma Putrudu (Telugu)
- 1988 Agni Natchathiram
- 1988 Paadatha Thenikkal
- 1988 Urimai Geetham
- 1989 Sonthakkaran
- 1989 Thaai Naadu
- 1989 Sahasame Naa Oopiri (Telugu)
- 1989 Pick Pocket
- 1989 Vicky Dada (Telugu)
- 1989 Pinni (Telugu)
- 1989 Geethanjali (Telugu)
- 1989 Kaaval Poonaigal
- 1989 Moodu Mandhiram
- 1989 Paasa Mazhai
- 1989 Naa Mogudu Naake Sontham (Telugu)
- 1989 Ajatha Satruvu (Telugu)
- 1989 Pudhu Mappillai
- 1989 En Purushanthaan Enakku Mattumthaan
- 1989 Kai Veesamma Kai Veesu
- 1989 Paattukku Oru Thalaivan
- 1989 Poruthathu Pothum
- 1989 Dharmam Vellum
- 1989 Rajanadai
- 1990 Pulan Visaranai
- 1990 Vaazhkai Chakkaram
- 1990 Pudhu Padagan
- 1990 Seetha
- 1990 Pagalil Pournami
- 1990 Sandhana Kaatru
- 1990 Anjali
- 1990 Siraiyil Pootha Chinna Malar
- 1990 Neti Siddhartha (Telugu)
- 1990 Thalattu Padava
- 1990 Avasara Police 100
- 1990 Mallu Vetti Minor
- 1991 Sami Potta Mudichu
- 1991 Stuartpuram Police Station (Telugu)
- 1991 Thaiyalkaran
- 1991 Nanbargal
- 1991 Neengalum Herodhan
- 1991 Vetri Karangal
- 1991 Sirai Kathavugal
- 1991 Vetri Padigal
- 1991 Captain Prabhakaran
- 1991 Maanagara Kaaval
- 1991 Archana IAS
- 1991 Vasanthakala Paravai
- 1991 Thalapathi
- 1992 Ilavarasan
- 1992 Mera Dil Tere Liye (Hindi)
- 1992 Sivantha Malar
- 1992 Chinarayudu (Telugu)
- 1992 Innisai Mazhai
- 1992 President Gari Pellam (Telugu)
- 1992 Chinna Pasanga Naanga
- 1992 Idhuthanda Sattam
- 1992 Nani (Telugu)
- 1992 Tyagi (Hindi)
- 1992 Suyamariyadhai
- 1992 Suriyan
- 1992 Chanti (Telugu)
- 1992 Ellaichami
- 1992 Naalaiya Theerpu
- 1992 Natchathira Nayagan
- 1993 Vedan
- 1993 Kattalai
- 1993 Thalattu
- 1993 Pon Vilangu
- 1993 Thanga Pappa
- 1993 I Love India
- 1993 Chinna Jameen
- 1993 Thiruda Thiruda
- 1994 Indhu
- 1994 Seeman
- 1994 Namma Annachi
- 1994 Athiradi Padai
- 1994 Ulavaali
- 1994 Rasigan
- 1994 May Madham
- 1994 Raja Pandi
- 1994 Thai Maaman
- 1995 Aanazhagan
- 1995 Maanthrikam (Malayalam)
- 1995 Nirnayam (Malayalam)
- 1995 Pullakuttikaran
- 1995 Makkal Aatchi
- 1995 Pokiri Raja (Telugu)
- 1995 Mounam (Telugu)
- 1995 Ragasiya Police
- 1995 Maaman Magal
- 1996 Mahaprabhu
- 1996 Vishwanath
- 1996 Sivasakthi
- 1996 Subash
- 1996 Indraprastham (Malayalam)
- 1996 The Prince (Malayalam)
- 1996 Thuraimugam
- 1996 Senathipathi
- 1997 Kaalamellam Kaathiruppen
- 1997 Lady Commissioner (Kannada)
- 1997 Kaalamellam Kadhal Vaazhga
- 1997 Arunachalam
- 1997 Raasi
- 1997 Vallal
- 1997 Yuddha (Kannada)
- 1997 Bhookailas (Malayalam)
- 1997 V. I. P
- 1997 Periya Idathu Mappillai
- 1997 Periya Manushan
- 1997 Poochudava
- 1998 Vaettiya Madichu Kattu
- 1998 Kannedhirey Thondrinal
- 1999 Chinna Durai
- 1999 Rajasthan
- 1999 Anantha Poongathe
- 1999 Kanave Kalaiyadhe
- 1999 Amarkkalam
- 1999 Pooparika Varugirom
- 1999 Maanaseega Kadhal
- 1999 Taj Mahal
- 1999 Olympian Anthony Adam
- 2000 Narasimham
- 2000 Vetri Kodi Kattu
- 2000 Independence Day (Tamil/Kannada)
- 2000 Parthen Rasithen
- 2001 Looty
- 2001 Aanandham
- 2001 Narasimha
- 2001 Dheena
- 2001 Star
- 2001 Chocklet
- 2001 Saivar Thirumeni
- 2001 Mitta Miraasu
- 2001 Love Marriage
- 2001 Thavasi
- 2001 Kadal Pookkal
- 2001 Majnu
- 2002 Alli Arjuna
- 2002 Azhagi
- 2002 Gemini
- 2002 Raajjiyam
- 2002 Thamizh
- 2002 Thamizhan
- 2002 Devan
- 2002 Ivan
- 2002 Naina
- 2002 Maaran
- 2002 Junction
- 2002 Ramana
- 2002 Solla Marandha Kadhai
- 2002 Bala
- 2003 Dhool
- 2003 Thandavam
- 2003 Pop Carn
- 2003 Anbu
- 2003 Kadhal Sadugudu
- 2003 Anbae Anbae
- 2003 Saamy
- 2003 Jayam
- 2003 Aahaa Ethanai Azhagu
- 2003 Success
- 2003 Kadhal Kisu Kisu
- 2003 Jay Jay
- 2003 Soori
- 2004 Kovil
- 2004 Varnajalam
- 2004 Autograph
- 2004 Jathi
- 2004 Lakshmi Narasimha (Telugu)
- 2004 Kuthu
- 2004 Machi
- 2004 Kudaikul Mazhai
- 2004 Attagasam
- 2004 Aai
- 2004 Jananam
- 2005 Dancer
- 2005 Ayya
- 2005 Ji
- 2005 Mannin Maindhan
- 2005 Maayavi
- 2005 Naran (Malayalam)
- 2005 Manthiran
- 2005 Englishkaran
- 2005 February 14
- 2005 Chanakya
- 2005 Kundakka Mandakka
- 2005 Kasthuri Maan
- 2006 Pasa Kiligal
- 2006 Pachchak Kuthira
- 2006 Madhu
- 2006 Kaivantha Kalai
- 2006 Naalai
- 2006 Imsai Arasan 23 m Pulikesi
- 2006 Kizhakku Kadarkarai Salai
- 2006 Sivappathigaram
- 2006 Veyil
- 2007 Aalwar
- 2007 Agaram
- 2007 Murugaa
- 2007 Muni
- 2007 Koodal Nagar
- 2007 July 4 (Malayalam)
- 2007 Alibhai (Malayalam)
- 2007 Nasrani (Malayalam)
- 2007 Mudhal Kanave
- 2007 Maa Madurai
- 2007 Kireedam
- 2007 Thirutham
- 2007 Nam Naadu
- 2007 Nenjai Thodu
- 2007 Kannamoochi Yenada
- 2008 Indiralohathil Na Azhagappan
- 2008 Sila Nerangalil
- 2008 Vaitheeswaran
- 2008 Kannum Kannum
- 2008 Vedha
- 2008 Of The People (Malayalam)
- 2008 Chakkara Viyugam
- 2008 Uliyin Osai
- 2008 Vaaranam Aayiram
- 2009 Naan Kadavul
- 2009 Perumal
- 2009 Vedigundu Murugesan
- 2009 Ninaithale Inikkum
- 2009 Solla Solla Inikkum
- 2009 Munnar
- 2009 Jaganmohini
- 2009 Adhe Neram Adhe Idam
- 2010 Porkkalam
- 2010 Thunichal
- 2010 Bombat Car (Kannada)
- 2010 Kutti Pisasu
- 2010 Ambasamudram Ambani
- 2010 Magizhchi
- 2010 Mandhira Punnagai
- 2010 Ayyanar
- 2010 Thenmerku Paruvakaatru
- 2011 Ayyan
- 2011 Avan Ivan
- 2011 Muni 2: Kanchana
- 2011 Yuvan Yuvathi
- 2011 Aayiram Vilakku
- 2012 Kantha
- 2012 Mattuthavani
- 2012 Marupadiyum Oru Kadhal
- 2012 Mirattal
- 2012 Kalpana (Kannada)
- 2012 Neerparavai
- 2012 Challenge (2012)
- 2013 Sundaattam
- 2013 Annakodi
- 2013 Thulli Vilaiyadu
- 2013 Attahasa (Kannada)
- 2013 Summa Nachunu Irukku
- 2013 Varuthapadatha Valibar Sangam
- 2013 Arya Surya
- 2013 6 Mezhuguvathigal
- 2014 Nedunchaalai
- 2014 Thalaivan
- 2014 Naan Thaan Bala
- 2015 Killadi
- 2015 Yagavarayinum Naa Kaakka
- 2015 JK Enum Nanbanin Vaazhkai
- 2015 En Vazhi Thani Vazhi
- 2015 Muni 3: Kanchana 2
- 2015 Kangaroo
- 2015 Eli
- 2016 Anjala
- 2016 Malupu (Telugu)
- 2016 Adida Melam
- 2016 Jithan 2
- 2016 Naanu Mattu Varalakshmi (Kannada)
- 2016 Thirunaal
- 2016 Virumandikkum Sivanandikkum
- 2017 Neruppu Da
- 2017 Kodi Veeran
- 2019 Ganesha Meendum Santhipom
- 2019 Muni 4: Kanchana 3
- 2019 Vennila Kabaddi Kuzhu 2
- 2019 Chambal (Kannada)
- 2020 Adavi
- 2020 Sandimuni
- 2021 Chasing
- 2021 Udanpirappe
- 2022 Therkathi Veeran
- 2023 Kannitheevu
- 2024 Mudakkaruthaan
- 2024 Pambattam
- 2024 Muniyandiyin Muni Paichal
- 2025 Madha Gaja Raja

== Actor ==
Year	Title	Role	Note
1983	Thangaikkor Geetham	Rogue	special appearance
1983	Seerum Singangal	Henchman	special appearance
1984	Madurai Sooran	Henchman	special appearance
1985	Kanni Rasi	Carrom Opponent	special appearance
1985	Aan Paavam	Super Subbarayan	special appearance as a Thief
1985	Neethiyin Marupakkam	Super	special appearance as a Henchaman
1986	Oru Iniya Udhayam	Subbu	
1987	Kalyana Kacheri	Farm Owner	special appearance
1987	Anjatha Singam	Rogue	special appearance
1989	Pudhea Paadhai	Subbarayan	special appearance as a Henchman
1990	Thalattu Padava	Rogue	special appearance
1990	Seetha	Henchman	special appearance
1992	Innisai Mazhai	Super	
1992	Chinna Pasanga Naanga	Bus Driver	special appearance
2006	Pachchak Kuthira	himself	special appearance
2015	Komban	Gundan Ramasamy	
2017	Kadamban	Moopa	
2017	Ivan Thanthiran	Minister Devaraj	
2020	Sandimuni		
2021	Chidambaram Railway Gate		
2021	Engada Iruthinga Ivvalavu Naala		
2021	Chasing		
2021	Kodiyil Oruvan		
2021	IPC 376		
2025	Madraskaaran	Muthupandi	
2025	Revolver Rita	Dracula Pandiyan	
2026	Ram and Leela		

== Extra fighter ==
- 1980 Kaali
- 1981 Adima Changala (Malayalam)
- 1982 Sakalakala Vallavan
- 1982 Pakkathu Veetu Roja
- 1982 Pokkiri Raja
- 1982 Kanne Radha
- 1983 Uruvangal Maralam
- 1983 Thoongadhey Thambi Thoongadhey
- 1983 Soorakottai Singakutti
- 1983 Malaiyoor Mambattiyan
- 1983 Mundhanai Mudichu
- 1983 Oru Kai Parpom

== Awards ==
Won

- 1991 Cinema Express Award for Best Stunt Director – Many movies
- 1997 Tamil Nadu State Film Award for Best Stunt Coordinator – Arunachalam
- 2001 Tamil Nadu State Film Award for Best Stunt Coordinator – Thavasi and Mitta Miraasu
- 2006 Tamil Nadu State Film Award for Best Stunt Coordinator – Veyil
- 2009 Ananda Vikatan Awards for Best Stunt Director – Naan Kadavul
- 2014 Tamil Nadu State Film Award for Best Stunt Coordinator – 6 Mezhuguvathigal and Nedunchaalai
- 2021 Kalaimamani Award

Nominated

- 2009 Vijay Award for Best Stunt Director – Naan Kadavul
