= Tamil Nadu State Film Award for Best Stunt Coordinator =

Indian film award

The Tamil Nadu State Film Award for Best Stunt Coordinator is given by the state government as part of the annual Tamil Nadu State Film Awards for Tamil-language (Kollywood) films.

== The list ==
Here is a list of the award winners and the films for which they won.

Year	Stunt Choreographer	Film
2022	Anal Arasu	Viruman
2021	Mahesh Mathew	Kodiyil Oruvan
2020	Super Subbarayan	Chasing
2019	Anbariv	Kaithi
2018	Supreme Sundar	Goli Soda 2
2017	Dhilip Subbarayan	Vikram Vedha; Theeran Adhigaaram Ondru
2016	Anbariv	Kaashmora; 24
2015	T. Ramesh	Uttama Villain
2014	Dhilip Subbarayan	Manja Pai; Ra
2013	Super Subbarayan	6 Mezhuguvarthigal; Nedunchaalai
2012	Stunt Silva	Vettai
2011	Peter Hein	Ko
2010	Anal Arasu	Vandae Maatharam
2009	Miracle Michael	Peraanmai
2008	Kanal Kannan	Silambattam
2007	Anal Arasu	Karuppusamy Kuthagaikaarar
2006	Super Subbarayan	Veyil
2005	Kanal Kannan	Sandakozhi
2004	Peter Hein	Bose
2003	Thalapathy Dinesh	Winner; Unnai Charanadaindhen
2002	Jaguar Thangam	Bagavathi
2001	Super Subbarayan	Thavasi; Mitta Miraasu
2000	Stun Siva	Kannukkul Nilavu
1999	Thalapathy Dinesh	Pooveli
1998	Jaguar Thangam	Priyamudan
1997	Super Subbarayan	Arunachalam
1996	Kanal Kannan; Jaguar Thangam	Selva; Poomani
1995	Kanal Kannan	Muthu
1994	Rocky Rajesh; Vikram Dharma	Honest Raj; Mahanadhi
1993		
1992	Rocky Rajesh	Chinna Gounder; Chembaruthi
1991	Vikram Dharma	Nadigan
1990	Rambo Rajkumar	Oru Thottil Sabadham

== See also ==
- Tamil cinema
- Cinema of India
