= Vijay Award for Best Stunt Director =

Indian film award

The Vijay Award for Best Stunt Director is given by Star Vijay as part of its annual Vijay Awards ceremony for Tamil (Kollywood) films.

== The list ==
Here is a list of the award winners and the films for which they won.

Year	Stunt Director	Film	Link
2014	Supreme sundar	Goli soda	
2013	Anal Arasu	Pandiya Naadu	
2012	Anal Arasu	Thadaiyara Thaakka	
2011	Dhilip Subbarayan	Aaranya Kaandam	
2010	Anal Arasu	Naan Mahaan Alla	
2009	Rajasekhar	Renigunta	
2008	Rajasekhar	Subramaniyapuram	
2007	Rambo Rajkumar	Polladhavan	
2006	Kanal Kannan	-	

== Nominations ==
=== 2000s ===
- 2007 Rambo Rajkumar - Polladhavan
  - Fefsi Vijayan - Pokkiri
  - Kanal Kannan - Deepavali
  - Peter Hein - Sivaji
  - William Ong - Billa
- 2008 Rajasekhar (stunt director)|Rajasekhar - Subramaniyapuram
  - Action Prakash - Anjathey
  - Kanal Kannan - Bheema
  - Thyagarajan, Kanal Kannan & Joop Katana - Dasavathaaram
- 2009 Rajasekhar - Renigunta
  - Kanal Kannan - Ayan
  - Kanal Kannan - Vettaikaaran
  - Super Subbarayan - Naan Kadavul
  - Fefsi Vijayan - Villu

=== 2010s ===
- 2010 Anal Arasu - Naan Mahaan Alla
  - Anal Arasu - Singam
  - Peter Hein - Enthiran
  - Kanal Kannan - Paiyaa
  - Rambo Rajkumar - Aayirathil Oruvan
- 2011 Dhilip Subbarayan - Aaranya Kaandam
  - Anal Arasu - Rowthiram
  - Peter Hein - 7aam Arivu
  - Rajasekhar - Aadukalam
  - Stunt Silva - Mankatha
- 2012 Anal Arasu - Thadaiyara Thaakka
  - Kecha Khamphakdee - Thuppakki
  - Peter Hein - Maattrraan
  - Rajasekhar - Muppozhudhum Un Karpanaigal
  - Stunt Silva- 3
- 2013 Anal Arasu - Pandiya Naadu
  - Anal Arasu, Rocky Rajesh - Singam II
  - Billa Jagan - Onaayum Aattukkuttiyum
  - Kecha Khamphakdee, Lee Whittaker, Parvez Feroz & T. Ramesh - Vishwaroopam
  - Rajasekhar - Ivan Veramathiri
- 2014 Supreme Sunder - Goli Soda
  - Anbariv - Madras
  - Anal Arasu - Kaththi
  - Kanal Kannan - Poojai
  - Stunt Silva - Veeram

== See also ==
- Tamil cinema
- Cinema of India
