= Balloon (2017 film) =

2017 Indian film by Sinish Sreedharan

- Theatrical Release Poster
- Directed by: Sinish Sreedharan
- Produced by: Dhilip Subbarayan; Arun Balaji; Nandakumar
- Starring: Jai; Anjali; Janani Iyer; Raj Tarun
- Cinematography: R. Saravanan
- Edited by: Ruben
- Music by: Yuvan Shankar Raja
- Production companies: 70mm Entertainment and Farmer's Master Plan Productions
- Distributed by: Auraa Cinemas
- Release date: 29 December 2017
- Running time: 170 minutes
- Country: India
- Language: Tamil

Balloon is a 2017 Indian Tamil-language horror thriller film written and directed by Sinish and produced by Dhilip Subbarayan, Arun Balaji and Nandakumar.The film stars Jai in a triple lead roles, alongside Janani Iyer and Anjali in the leading roles. Featuring music composed by Yuvan Shankar Raja, the film began production in June 2016, and was released on 29 December 2017. This film performed averagely at the box office.

== Plot ==
Jeevanandam, an aspiring filmmaker, travels to Ooty along with his wife Jacqueline, his nephew, and two friends in the hope of making a film on a haunted house which he discovers through a Facebook post. He lives in a guest house close to the house. That is when they begin experiencing strange things with the boy being lured by a balloon and befriending a ghostly girl. After realising that they are the targets of ghostly beings, they search for a priest who befriends them and helps them, and through him, get to know Jeeva's previous birth as Charlie and the injustice done to him. Jeeva takes revenge on the ones who did the injustice to the Charlie and his girlfriend Shenbagavalli and the priest is revealed to be a spirit. Finally, they leave the place, and the camera pans out of the film screen, and the whole film is revealed to be shown as a movie played in a theatre, with it being the first film of aspiring filmmaker Jeevanandam and the real Jeevanandam, Jacqueline and the others as actors in the film. The film ends with Raja Ravindra, a film person, receiving a call from people and planning to demand money as the film has controversial content. Finally, the real ghosts appear and finish him off.

== Cast ==
- Jai in a triple role as:
  - Jeevanandham (Jeeva)
  - Charlie
  - Jai (cameo)
- Anjali as Jacqueline
- Janani Iyer as Shenbagavalli (Shembu)
- Yogi Babu as Paanda (Nandha Babu)
- Joy Mathew as Father Andrews
- Nagineedu as Community Leader
- Ramachandran Durairaj as Henchman
- K. S. G. Venkatesh as Cinema Producer
- Subbu Panchu Arunachalam as Jeeva's brother
- Master Rishi as Pappu, Jeeva's nephew
- Baby Monica as Joy, Charlie's adopted daughter
- Gayathri Raja as Shenbagavalli's friend
- Karthik Yogi as Arokkiam
- Poster Nandakumar
- P. L. Thenappan
- Supergood Subramani
- Raj Tarun as Jeevanandham (special appearance)
- Chandini Tamilarasan as Jeevanandham's girlfriend (guest appearance)
- Raja Ravindra (special appearance)

== Production ==
In March 2016, Jai signed on to appear in a horror film directed by Sinish, who had earlier made Endrendrum (2014) and worked as an assistant on the production of the shelved project, Vettai Mannan. Produced by Kandasamy Nandakumar and Arun Balaji, the director revealed that Jai would portray a married man and would have three separate looks in the film. Anjali was signed on to play the female lead role in June 2016, despite a statement by the actress in 2011 that she would not like to be in films starring Jai in the lead role. Titled Balloon, the film was launched in July 2016 and began production thereafter.

Following the success of Bigg Boss Tamil and the famous words of actress Oviya, the term "Neenga Shut Up Pannunga" was used in a song in the film. This promotional song was sung by Anirudh Ravichander and released on 28 August 2017, with Anjali going inside the Bigg Boss house to promote the film.

== Soundtrack ==
Balloon

Soundtrack album by Yuvan Shankar Raja
- Released: 5 December 2017
- Genre: Feature film soundtrack
- Length: 18:26
- Language: Tamil
- Labels: Auraa Music; Divo
- Producer: Yuvan Shankar Raja

Yuvan Shankar Raja chronology
Semma Botha Aagathey (2017)	Balloon (2017)	Irumbu Thirai (2018)

The soundtrack was composed by Yuvan Shankar Raja.

All lyrics are written by Arunraja Kamaraj.

Track-List
No.	Title	Singer(s)	Length
1.	"Vaanam Dhaane"	Rizwan	2:53
2.	"Mazhai Megam"	Yuvan Shankar Raja, Priya Jerson	3:50
3.	"Uyirile Uyirile"	Vijay Yesudas, Priyanka NK	3:35
4.	"Shutup Pannunga"	Anirudh Ravichander, Arunraja Kamaraj	3:16
5.	"The Balloon's Mystery - Title Track" (Instrumental)		2:10
6.	"Revenge Of The Joker - Theme" (Instrumental)		2:42
Total length:			18:27

== Release ==
The film opened across Tamil Nadu on 29 December 2017, notably alongside two films that the film's co-producer Dhilip Subbarayan had worked in as an actor, Sangu Chakkaram and Ulkuthu. The satellite rights of the film were sold to Zee Tamil. The HDRip Version Released in January, 2019

=== Reception ===
Times of India wrote "Balloon doesn't break any new ground in the horror genre, but it adapts a bunch of the genre's tropes — possessed kid, exorcism, revenge-seeking ghost and the like — to give us a solid horror film." Hindustan Times wrote "Balloon lacks elements that make us sit up. It works to an extent, but even that doesn't leave us in awe." Behindwoods wrote "Debutante director Sinish Sreedharan's Balloon is more of a thriller comedy than a horror. Of course, there are plenty of horror moments but the USP of the film is the comedy that keeps the audience entertained in the first half." New Indian Express wrote "Balloon's story or scares aren't novel but the laughs are. The humour and one-liners are the saving grace in this film, that is a predictable mish-mash of some memorable horror moments from the past." Firstpost wrote "Balloon is a well made horror comedy that provides the necessary thrill needed for the genre." The Hindu wrote "Balloon is uninventive and ends up repeating sequences from earlier horror flicks".

Despite the favourable response it had at the box office, the film's co-producers, T. N. Arun Balaji and Kandasamy Nandhakumar of 70 MM Films, filed a complaint against Jai to the Tamil Film Producers Council citing that the actor's unprofessional behaviour delayed the film's release. The complaint stated that the shoot for the film began in June 2016 and the film was expected to release by January 2017. However, it was delayed multiple times solely because of Jai and his actions led to the production house seeking a payment of Rs 1.50 crore. They added that Jai failed to turn up on the dates he had given, and did not cooperate with the makers, leading to the film's release being postponed to September 2017 and his failure to attend the dubbing sessions delayed the release even more. It was also alleged that he regularly attended the shooting spot drunk, and as a result of Jai's troubles, director Sinish contemplated suicide during the making of the film in Kodaikanal suicide point.
