= Anal Arasu =

Indian fight master/action choreographer

- Born: C. M. A. Arasakumar; 12 December 1970 (age 55); Chennai, Tamil Nadu, India
- Occupations: Stunt coordinator; actor

Anal Arasu (born as C. M. A. Arasakumar) is an Indian fight master/action choreographer, who works in the Tamil, Telugu, Malayalam and Hindi film industries. He started his career as an extra fighter and assistant to stunt masters including Rambo Rajkumar, Judo. K. K. Rathnam, Vikram Dharma, Jaguar Thangam, Kanal Kannan, Stun Siva and Peter Hein. His work has received critical acclaim.

Influenced by his father, C. M. Arasu, who had done several movies in the 1980s, Arasu stated that he always wanted to be an "action man". Chatrapathy was his first film. He has since gone to collaborate with director Prabhu Deva for the action films Vedi (2011) and Rowdy Rathore (2012). He worked with A. R. Murugadoss for Kaththi (2014) and S. Shankar for I (2015).

== Filmography ==
=== Fight Master ===
Year	Title	Language	Notes	Ref.
2004	Arul	Tamil		
2004	Chatrapathy	Tamil		
2005	Jithan	Tamil		
2005	Ben Johnson	Malayalam		
2005	Lokanathan IAS	Malayalam		
2005	Raam	Tamil		
2006	Azhagai Irukkirai Bayamai Irukkirathu	Tamil		
2006	Yuga	Tamil		
2006	Thuruppugulan	Malayalam		
2006	Jambhavan	Tamil		
2006	Nenjirukkum Varai	Tamil		
2006	Thagapansamy	Tamil		
2006	Baba Kalyani	Malayalam		
2007	Chotta Mumbai	Malayalam		
2007	Big B	Malayalam		
2008	Pidichirukku	Tamil		
2008	Aandavan	Malayalam		
2008	Singakutty	Tamil		
2008	Thenavattu	Tamil		
2008	Thiruvannamalai	Tamil		
2009	Puthiya Mukham	Malayalam		
2009	Sagar Alias Jacky Reloaded	Malayalam		
2009	Chattambinadu	Malayalam		
2009	1977	Tamil		
2009	Madurai Sambavam	Tamil		
2010	Singam	Tamil		
2010	Vandae Maatharam	Tamil		
2010	Anwar	Malayalam		
2010	The Thriller	Malayalam		
2010	Chekavar	Malayalam		
2010	Naan Mahaan Alla	Tamil		
2011	Christian Brothers	Malayalam		
2011	Rowthiram	Tamil		
2011	Yamla Pagla Deewana	Hindi		
2011	Urumi	Malayalam		
2011	Azhagarsamiyin Kuthirai	Tamil		
2011	Bodinayakkanur Ganesan	Tamil		
2011	Velayudham	Tamil		
2011	Vedi	Tamil		
2011	Rajapattai	Tamil		
2012	The King & the Commissioner	Malayalam		
2012	Maasi	Tamil		
2012	Saguni	Tamil		
2012	Thadaiyara Thaakka	Tamil		
2012	Rowdy Rathore	Hindi		
2012	Dabangg 2	Hindi		
2013	Mirchi	Telugu		
2013	Singam II	Tamil		
2013	Pattathu Yaanai	Tamil		
2013	Boss	Hindi		
2013	Aadhalal Kadhal Seiveer	Tamil		
2013	Pandiya Naadu	Tamil		
2014	Heropanti	Hindi		
2014	Jai Ho	Hindi		
2014	Holiday: A Soldier Is Never Off Duty	Hindi		
2014	Kick	Hindi		
2014	Jeeva	Tamil		
2014	Kaththi	Tamil		
2014	Villali Veeran	Malayalam		
2014	Meaghamann	Tamil		
2015	I	Tamil		
2015	Pulan Visaranai 2	Tamil		
2015	Jil	Tamil		
2015	Paayum Puli	Tamil		
2015	Srimanthudu	Telugu		
2015	Bruce Lee - The Fighter	Telugu		
2016	Kathakali	Tamil		
2016	Marudhu	Tamil		
2016	Darvinte Parinamam	Malayalam		
2016	Sultan	Hindi		
2016	Janatha Garage	Telugu		
2016	Remo	Tamil		
2016	Premam	Telugu		
2016	Final Cut of Director	Hindi		
2016	Maaveeran Kittu	Tamil		
2017	Bairavaa	Tamil		
2017	Shivalinga	Tamil		
2017	Velaiilla Pattadhari 2	Tamil		
2017	Jai Lava Kusa	Telugu		
2017	Mersal	Tamil		
2017	Comrade in America	Malayalam		
2017	Velaikkaran	Tamil		
2018	Race 3	Hindi		
2018	Seema Raja	Tamil		
2018	Sandakozhi 2	Tamil		
2019	NGK	Tamil		
2019	Bigil	Tamil		
2019	Sanga Thamizhan	Tamil		
2019	Dabangg 3	Hindi		
2020	Shylock	Malayalam		
2020	Coolie No. 1	Hindi		
2021	Chakra	Tamil		
2022	Veerame Vaagai Soodum	Tamil		
2022	Aaraattu	Malayalam		
2022	Yaanai	Tamil		
2022	The Legend	Tamil		
2022	Viruman	Tamil		
2022	Godfather	Telugu		
2023	Kisi Ka Bhai Kisi Ki Jaan	Hindi		
2023	Japan	Tamil		
2023	Jawan	Hindi		
2024	Tillu Square	Telugu		
2024	Lal Salaam	Tamil		
2024	Maharaja	Tamil		
2024	Indian 2	Tamil		
2024	Devara: Part 1	Telugu		
2024	Baby John	Hindi		
2025	Deva	Hindi		
2025	Jaat	Hindi		
2025	War 2	Hindi		
2026	Vaa Vaathiyaar	Tamil		
2026	Jana Nayagan	Tamil		
2026	Irumudi	Telugu		

=== Actor ===
- 2006 Thuruppugulan as Killadi Raja
- 2011 Rajapattai in a special appearance as himself
- 2016 Darvinte Parinamam as Solomon

=== Director ===
- 2025 Phoenix

== Awards and nominations ==
Year	Film	Award	Result	Ref.
2007	Karuppusamy Kuththagaithaarar	Tamil Nadu State Film Award for Best Stunt Coordinator	Won	
2010	Vandae Maatharam	Tamil Nadu State Film Award for Best Stunt Coordinator	Won	
2010	Naan Mahaan Alla	Ananda Vikatan Award for Best Stunt Choreography	Won	
2010	Naan Mahaan Alla	Vijay Award for Best Stunt Director	Won	
2010	Singam	Vijay Award for Best Stunt Director	Nominated	
2011	Rowthiram	Ananda Vikatan Award for Best Stunt Choreography	Won	
2011	Rowthiram	Vijay Award for Best Stunt Director	Nominated	
2012	Thadaiyara Thaakka	Vijay Award for Best Stunt Director	Won	
2012	Thadaiyara Thaakka	Ananda Vikatan Award for Best Stunt Choreography	Won	
2012	Thadaiyara Thaakka	South Indian International Movie Awards for Best Fight Choreographer	Nominated	
2013	Pandiya Naadu	South Indian International Movie Awards for Best Fight Choreographer	Won	
2013	Pandiya Naadu	Vijay Award for Best Stunt Director	Won	
2013	Pandiya Naadu	Behindwoods Gold Medal for Best Stunt Choreographer	Won	
2013	Singam II	Behindwoods Gold Medal for Best Stunt Choreographer	Won	
2014	Kaththi	South Indian International Movie Awards for Best Fight Choreographer	Won	
2014	Kaththi	Vijay Award for Best Stunt Director	Nominated	
2015	Pandiya Naadu	Southern India Cinematographer's Association Awards for Best Stunt Choreographer	Nominated	
2018	Mersal	V4 MGR Sivaji Academy Award for Best Stunt Master	Won	
2019	Bigil	Norway Tamil Film Festival Award for Best Stunt Choreographer	Nominated	
2019	Race 3	Taurus World Stunt Awards for Best Action in a foreign film	Nominated	
2024	Jawan	Taurus World Stunt Awards for Best stunt coordinator	Nominated	
