= Mangalanathan Gurukkal =

Indian priest and actor

- Occupations: Priest, actor
- Years active: 2002–present

Mangalanathan Gurukkal also spelled Mangalanatha Gurukkal is an Indian Hindu Tamil priest and film actor. He has appeared in over 400 films.

== Early life ==
He was borin in Sevur village near Tindivanam. He then relocated to Mayilapore.

In 2021, Gurukkal lodged a police complaint against scammers for allegedly spreading fake news and rumours about his health on social media, including claims that he died due to COVID-19 pandemic.

== Career ==
He belongs to the Brahmin community, a typical Gurukkal who performs pooja and other rituals in kovils, cultural events and weddings. He began his religious work as a temple priest at Valampuri Vinayagar Kovil in Mayilapore.

=== Actor ===
He predominantly appeared in Tamil films in Hindu priest roles, mostly confined to astrology, kalyana homam (Hindu wedding fire rituals) and kovil pooja sequences where he would recite holy sacred mantras. He featured in AVM Studio's Tamil television soap opera Nambikkai where he played the role of a poosari performing rituals. He also performed pooja rituals for the inauguration of Sun TV's Tamil television soap opera Metti Oli, appearing in the first episode.

He made his film acting debut in Suriya starrer Sri (2002) after accepting a film offer to play a role in Sri through a phone call from a wellwisher. It was revealed that the wellwisher apparently requested Mangalanathan Gurukkal to take around 50 elder women to the shooting spot for a pooja sequence. During the film shooting of Varalaru (2006), Ajith Kumar affectionately nicknamed him as "High-Tech Iyer" after seeing how Mangalanathan had motorbike keys around his stomach and simultaneously was performing mantra rituals.

Mangalanathan Gurukkal is respected among film fraternity and he is invited occasionally to inaugurate pooja ceremonies.

== Partial filmography ==
=== Films ===
- Sri (2002)
- Madhurey (2004)
- Kai Vandha Kalai (2006)
- Varalaru (2006)
- Sabari (2007)
- Urchagam (2007)
- Machakaaran (2007)
- Poi Solla Porom (2008)
- Gnabagangal (2009)
- Thambikku Indha Ooru (2010)
- Naan Mahaan Alla (2010)
- Kadhalil Sodhappuvadhu Yeppadi (2012)
- Ethir Neechal (2013)
- Jilla (2014)
- Bairavaa (2017)
- Sangu Chakkaram (2017)
- Monster (2019)
- Sooriyanum Sooriyagandhiyum (2024)
- Middle Class (2025)
- Idhayam Murali (2026)

=== Television ===
- Nambikkai
- Metti Oli (2002)
