= Kanni Rasi =

- Theatrical release poster
- Directed by: Pandiarajan
- Screenplay by: G. M. Kumar; Livingston
- Story by: Pandiarajan
- Produced by: S. Shanmugarajan; D. Manickavasagam
- Starring: Prabhu; Revathi
- Cinematography: Ashok Kumar
- Edited by: V. Rajagopal
- Music by: Ilaiyaraaja
- Production company: Vigranth Creation
- Release date: 15 February 1985
- Running time: 130 minutes
- Country: India
- Language: Tamil

Kanni Rasi (transl. Virgo Sign) is a 1985 Indian Tamil language film directed by Pandiarajan in his directorial debut. The film stars Prabhu and Revathi. It was released on 15 February 1985. The film was remade in Telugu as Menamama (1988).

== Plot ==
Lakshmipathi is a carefree youth in a village who searches for a job. His elder sister Kasthuri sends him a letter from Chennai, telling him to visit her and the villagers compel him to leave the village. He leaves the village to live with his sister. His brother-in-law Gopi Krishna finds him a job as a watchman. Kasthuri's daughter Dhanalakshmi falls in love with Lakshmipathi for which he reciprocates as well, as it was then common for a girl to be married to her mother's younger brother. Kasthuri also wants to get them married and meets an astrologer. But the astrologer informs that their horoscopes don't match and if Lakshmipathi marries Dhanalakshmi, it will lead to his death. Kasthuri is worried hearing this and decides to prevent them from getting married.

Kasthuri evicts Lakshmipathi from her house and Sivaraman, who is also in love with Dhanalakshmi, accommodates him without knowing his identity. Kasthuri convinces Dhanalakshmi to forget Lakshmipathi by letting her know the truth. Dhanalakshmi acts rude towards Lakshmipathi and criticises that he is not educated thinking that Lakshmipathi would develop hatred towards her. Sivaraman learns about the love between Dhanalakshmi and Lakshmipathi and decides to get them together. Dhanalakshmi meets Lakshmipathi and informs the truth about horoscopes. Lakshmipathi understands Dhanalakshmi's situation and convinces her not to believe on astrology. Lakshmipathi and Dhanalakshmi start meeting frequently without the knowledge of her mother. However, once when they are travelling together in a bike, they meet with an accident but luckily they are not injured. Kasthuri learns of this and becomes infuriated. She believes that the accident was a signal of threat for Lakshmipathi's life.

Heart broken, Lakshmipathi returns to his village to stay with his parents. Dhanalakshmi sends a letter mentioning that her wedding is fixed with another man. Lakshmipathi rushes to Chennai and on the day of Dhanalakshmi's wedding, he tries to convince Kasthuri to cancel the wedding and give her approval for his wedding with Dhanalakshmi. Lakshmipathi succeeds in convincing Kasthuri not to believe on horoscopes as he cites an example of their neighbour who lived happily despite an astrologer's warning. Kasthuri's agrees for the wedding and Lakshmipathi marries Dhanalakshmi, however Dhanalakshmi faints after wedding. She informs that she has already consumed poison as she was about to marry someone else. Dhanalakshmi dies in the hands of Lakshmipathi.

== Cast ==
- Prabhu as Lakshmipathi
- Revathi as Dhanalakshmi
- Sumithra as Kasthuri
- Goundamani as Gopi Krishna
- Janagaraj as Sivaraman
- Vennira Aadai Moorthy as a professor
- Kallapetti Singaram as Lakshmipathi's father
- S. N. Lakshmi as Lakshmipathi's mother
- Master Haja Sheriff as Haja
- Senthil as Lakshmipathi's friend
- Mayilsamy as a Retailer's delivery boy
- Pandiarajan as a person praying (cameo)
- Super Subbarayan as MLA Son

== Soundtrack ==
The music was composed by Ilaiyaraaja. The song "Sugaraagamae" is set in the Carnatic raga Manirangu.

Song	Singer(s)	Lyrics	Duration
"Aala Asatthum"	S. P. Balasubrahmanyam, Vani Jairam	Vaali	4:37
"Sorunna Satti"	Ilaiyaraaja, T. K. S. Kalaivanan, Krishnachandar, Deepan Chakravarthy	Vairamuthu	4:22
"Sugaraagame"	Malaysia Vasudevan, Vani Jairam	Kuruvikkarambai Shanmugam	4:51
"Kaathaliley Tholvi"	Malaysia Vasudevan, Gangai Amaran	Gangai Amaran	4:15

== Reception ==
Jayamanmadhan (a duo) of Kalki wrote Pandiarajan in his debut completely reminds of his mentor K. Bhagyaraj. The duo also praised the humour, performances of Prabhu and Revathi and Ilaiyaraaja's music but felt if the director had not slipped towards the end, the film would have been a hundred days. Balumani of Anna praised acting, humour, cinematography, music and direction.
