= Poi Solla Porom =

- Theatrical release poster
- Directed by: Vijay
- Written by: Vijay
- Story by: Jaideep Sahni
- Based on: Khosla Ka Ghosla by Dibakar Banerjee and Jaideep Sahni
- Produced by: Priyadarshan; Ronnie Screwvala
- Starring: Nassar; Nedumudi Venu; Moulee; Karthik Kumar; Piaa Bajpai
- Cinematography: Aravind Krishna
- Edited by: Anthony
- Music by: M. G. Sreekumar (songs); Gopi Sunder (BGM)
- Production company: Four Frames Pictures
- Distributed by: UTV Motion Pictures
- Release date: 12 September 2008
- Country: India
- Language: Tamil

Poi Solla Porom (transl. We Are Going to Lie) is a 2008 Tamil comedy film directed by Vijay. It is a remake of the 2006 Hindi film Khosla Ka Ghosla and stars Nassar, Nedumudi Venu, Moulee, Karthik Kumar, and debutante Piaa Bajpai alongside an ensemble supporting cast including Omar Lateef, Justina, Lakshmi Ramakrishnan, Cochin Haneefa, Bosskey, and John Vijay. The music was composed by M. G. Sreekumar with editing done by Anthony and cinematography by Aravind Krishna. The film released on 12 September 2008. The story is loosely based on real-life famous landgrabber and land shark E. V. Perumalsamy Reddy of EVP Film city based out of Chennai, who is famous for forging documents to take possession of others land.

== Plot ==
K. R. Sathyanathan (Nedumudi Venu) is a typical middle-class man who has just retired. He wants to buy a plot of land in the city and move in with his wife Saradha (Lakshmi Ramakrishnan) and children: Uppilinathan alias Uppili (Karthik Kumar), Vishwanathan alias Vicha (Omar Lateef), and Sindhu (Justina). However, Uppili, who is a software engineer, has no interest in the house and is keen to leave India for New York, where he has obtained a job.

Sathyanathan buys the plot from "World Famous Properties", which is managed by Vijayakumar (Cochin Haneefa). When he goes to break stone to build his house, he finds a compound wall erected over his plot with the nameplate saying "Baby Properties". After numerous attempts to meet him, Sathyanathan finally meets Baby (Nassar), who wants him to pay half of the amount paid for the plot to be paid to Baby in order to vacate the plot. The Sathyanathan family tries to think of multiple solutions and finally resorts to hiring thugs to break the compound at night. Sathyanathan is arrested the next morning.

Through all this, Uppili's attitude towards his father's problem changes when he sees how attached he is to the property. Uppili meets his travel agent named Asif Iqbal alias Asif Bhai (Bosskey) to cancel the US trip. Asif reveals that he was once Baby's assistant and was cheated by him of his ancestral land. Uppili, with the help his girlfriend Amrutha (Piaa Bajpai) and Asif, convinces Daddy (Moulee), who is a stage actor and has 136 awards, to act as Varma, an NRI businessman from Dubai. He pretends to have come to India to sell a plot which actually belongs to the fisheries board of the government. At last, Baby pays Varma, the advance amount (35 lakhs) for the fishery land and the Sathyanathan family uses that money to get their land.

The film ends with Sathyanathan's family living happily on their land. Baby's assistant Johnny (John Vijay) reveals that there is no man in the name of Varma and the land belongs to the state government. Baby acknowledges that he has been cheated and decides to cover it up to preserve his reputation.

== Cast ==
- Nassar as Baby
- Nedumudi Venu as K. R. Sathyanathan (voice dubbed by Rajesh)
- Moulee as "Daddy"/Chandra Mohan
- Karthik Kumar as Uppilinathan alias Uppili
- Piaa as Amrutha (voice dubbed by Suchitra)
- V. M. C. Haneefa as Vijayakumar
- John Vijay as Johnny
- Lakshmi Ramakrishnan as Saradha
- Omar Lateef as Vishwanathan alias Vicha
- Delhi Ganesh as Principal
- Balaji Venugopal as Stage Director Sharmaji
- Bosskey as Asif Iqbal (Asif Bhai)
- Justina as Sindhu
- George Maryan as Muthu Karuppan
- Sampath Ram as Tsunami Sukumar
- Siva Narayana Murthy as Thug Head
- Munnar Ramesh as Inspector
- Mangalanathan Gurukkal as Priest
- Aravind Krishna as Police Inspector (uncredited)
- Ravi Venkatraman as Police officer (uncredited)

== Production ==
After Kireedam, Priyadarshan approached Vijay to remake the Hindi film Khosla Ka Ghosla in Tamil under his production house and hence they collaborated to make Poi Solla Porom. The film was completed within 34 days, with a cast containing veteran actors such as Nassar and Nedumudi Venu as well as relative newcomers including Karthik Kumar and Piaa Bajpai. The film also became one of the first ventures in Tamil cinema to feature a promotional song, with Vijay maintaining that the song reflected the story of the film.

== Soundtrack ==
The music was composed by M. G. Sreekumar, who made his debut as composer in Tamil with this film, while another Malayalam composer Gopi Sundar, who too made his debut in Tamil with this film, composed the film score.

- "Poi Solla Porom" - Jassie Gift
- "Gandhi Note Kaiyil" - Kailash Kher
- "Indha Payanthil" - Swetha Mohan
- "Indha Payanathil" II - Ranjith
- "Oru Vaarthai Pesamal" - Shreya Ghoshal
- "Kannamoochi Aattam" - Karthik

== Critical reception ==
The Hindu wrote that "Vijay’s dialogue, both humorous and thought-provoking, tickles the viewer almost throughout" and that "Vijay has understood the pulse of the audience even while sticking to his stand of providing standard fare".
