= Thamarai Kulam =

1959 film by Muktha Srinivasan

- Theatrical release poster
- Directed by: Muktha Srinivasan
- Written by: S.R. Natarajan
- Produced by: S. R. Natarajan; S. R. Veerabahu
- Starring: Sowcar Janaki; V. Gopalakrishnan
- Cinematography: S. R. Veerabahu
- Music by: H. Padmanabha Sarma; T. A. Mothi
- Production company: Kalyani Pictures
- Release date: 14 April 1959
- Country: India
- Language: Tamil

Thamarai Kulam (transl. Lotus Pond) is a 1959 Indian Tamil language film directed by Muktha Srinivasan, written by S. R. Natarajan and produced by him along with S. R. Veerabahu. The film stars features Sowcar Janaki and V. Gopalakrishnan. M. R. Radha, N. N. Kannappa, K. Sarangapani, V. S. Raghavan, S. A. Ashokan, Kaka Radhakrishnan, S. N. Lakshmi, Padmini Priyadarshini, and Nagesh in his film debut play supporting roles. The film was released on 14 April 1959.

== Plot ==
A greedy zamindar bars the villagers from using Thamaraikulam, the village tank. Under the leadership of Chellaiah, the son of a landowner, the villagers organise a revolution. Chellaiah goes to Madras to seek help from his friend Sekhar. A series of complications follow which include the heroine being kidnapped and tortured, and Sekhar murdered. How Chellaiah and the villagers solve these problems forms the rest of the story.

== Cast ==
Credits adapted from The Hindu:

- Sowcar Janaki
- V. Gopalakrishnan
- M. R. Radha
- N. N. Kannappa
- K. Sarangapani
- V. S. Raghavan
- K. K. Rathnam
- S. A. Ashokan
- Kaka Radhakrishnan
- S. N. Lakshmi
- Padmini Priyadarshini
- Nagesh

== Production ==
Thamarai Kulam was produced under the banner Kalyani Pictures. Writer S. R. Natarajan and cinematographer S. R. Veerabahu were the producers, and Muktha Srinivasan was director. Nagesh, then a struggling actor, was noticed by Srinivasan during a play in Mylapore. Srinivasan, impressed with Nagesh's comic performance, hired him to act in another comic role in Thamarai Kulam, for a salary of ₹2500, though Nagesh revealed that the production company did not pay him the intended salary. The film thus became Nagesh's cinematic acting debut. S. M. Ramkumar and Kameswaran served as the dance choreographers. Shooting took place at the now non-existent Golden Studios.

== Soundtrack ==
The music was composed by H. Padmanabha Sarma and T. A. Mothi. The playback singers were P. Susheela, Mothi, P. Leela, Sirkazhi Govindarajan, S. C. Krishnan, A. P. Komala and ‘Nellore’ Janaki.

== Release and reception ==
Thamarai Kulam was released on 14 April 1959. The film, which was written with Leftist themes, was not well received by viewers because, according to historian Randor Guy, "Tamil cinema was then dominated by movies of Sivaji Ganesan with accent on high-flown, alliterative dialogue". Nagesh's performance was panned by the Tamil magazine Ananda Vikatan. Kanthan of the magazine Kalki appreciated Srinivasan's direction and said the film could be watched once only for Radha's performance.
