= Padmini Priyadarshini =

Indian actor

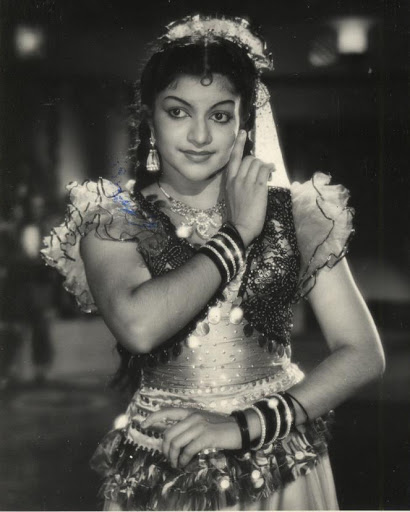
- Born: 8 September 1944; Mavelikkara, Kerala
- Died: 17 January 2016 (aged 71); Bangalore, Karnataka

Padmini Priyadarshini (later Padmini Ramachandran) was an Indian actor, dancer and choreographer. She acted in supporting roles during the 1950s and 1960s in Tamil, Kannada and Hindi films. She established a dancing school in Bangalore named Natya Priya. In 2013, she received Shantala Natya Sri Award from Karnataka Government.

== Personal life ==
Born in Mavelikkara, Kerala, she was brought up in Chennai. She learned dancing from Vazhuvoor B. Ramaiyah Pillai. Padmini Priyadarshini was married to Ramachandran from Thalassery and the couple had 3 sons and 1 daughter.

== Career ==
She established a dancing school in Bangalore. She has performed dance concerts with her students in countries like United Kingdom and United States. She was appointed as its Head when Karnataka government formed the 'Education Board'.

== Notable films ==
Padmini Priyadarshini in Sahodhari

- Sahodhari (1959)
- Paadha Kaanikkai (1962)
- Life of Pi (2012)

== Partial filmography ==
(in Alphabetical order)

=== English and French ===
1. Life of Pi (film)

=== Hindi ===
1. Dil Hi To Hai
2. Do Behnen (1959)

=== Kannada ===
1. Bettada Kalla
2. Bhakta Markandeya
3. Jagajyothi Basveshwara
4. Rayara Sose

=== Tamil ===
1. Annaiyin Aanai (Dancer)
2. Baghdad Thirudan
3. Bhaktha Markandeya (Dancer - Pazhanimalaiyaanai)
4. Deiva Balam
5. Iru Sagodharigal (Dancer)
6. Iruvar Ullam
7. Kuravanji (Dancer)
8. Maalaiyitta Mangai
9. Nenjam Marappathillai
10. Paadha Kaanikkai
11. Petra Manam
12. Rathinapuri Ilavarasi
13. Sahodhari
14. Thamarai Kulam
15. Then Nilavu
16. Vidivelli
17. Motor Sundaram Pillai
18. Bhaaga Pirivinai

=== Telugu ===
1. Kalasi Vunte Kaladu Sukham (Dancer)
2. Nartanasala (Urvashi)
