= Enga Thambi =

- Poster
- Directed by: S. D. Saba
- Screenplay by: R. M. Veerappan
- Story by: Sathya Movies Story Department
- Produced by: V. Thamilazhagan; V. Selvam; V. Thangaraj
- Starring: Prashanth; Subhashri
- Cinematography: C. Maya
- Edited by: K. R. Krishnan
- Music by: Ilaiyaraaja
- Production company: Sathya Movies
- Release date: 9 April 1993
- Running time: 138 minutes
- Country: India
- Language: Tamil

Enga Thambi (transl. Our Younger Brother) is a 1993 Indian Tamil-language romantic action film directed by Sabapathy Dekshinamurthy. The film stars Prashanth and Subhashri, with Lakshmi, Nagesh and Nassar in supporting roles. It was released on 9 April 1993. The film was dubbed in Telugu as Allari Prema.

== Plot ==
Pichumani is an orphan, and Muthu brings him up. Pichumani falls in love with Indu, but her uncle Dinakar, a police officer, opposes this. Nevertheless, Indu is determined to wed her first love. To avert this, Dinakar hatches a plan through which Pichumani is imprisoned. When Indu gives up hope, advocate Shanthi emerges to fight his case. It is revealed that Shanthi and Dinakar have been in a relationship earlier. In the end, Dinakar is arrested and discovers that Pichumani is his son and that Shanthi is his mother. The film ends with Pichumani and Indu getting married.

== Cast ==
- Prashanth as Pichumani
- Subhashri as Indu
- Lakshmi as Shanthi
- Nagesh as Muthu
- Nassar as Dinakar
- Chinni Jayanth as Double Seven
- Thyagu as K.K
- Madhan Bob as Sharma
- Kullamani
- V. S. Raghavan
- Rocky Rajesh in a special appearance as Rocky Rajesh
- Raju Sundaram in a special appearance

== Soundtrack ==
The music was composed by Ilaiyaraaja.

Song	Singer(s)	Lyrics
"Antha Utchi Malai"	Mano	Vaali
"Ithu Maanodum"	Arunmozhi, Uma Ramanan	Muthulingam
"Manil Vanthu"	Mano	Ponnadiyan
"Malaiyoram Maankuruvi"	Mano, Minmini	Pulamaipithan
"Maane Marghathamey"	Mano, S. Janaki	Vaali
"Usukko"	Minmini	Vaali

https://mossymart.com/shop/enga-thambi-tamil-film-audio-cassette-by-ilayaraaja-3/ The movie was dubbed into Telugu as Allari Prema and lyrics were written by Vennelakanti

Telugu (Dubbed) Track listing
No.	Title	Singer (s)	Length
1.	"Madilona Mata"	S. P. Balasubramanyam, K. S. Chitra
2.	"Edo Jariginadi"	S. P. Balasubramanyam, S. P. Sailaja
3.	"Idhi Mohale"	S. P. Balasubramanyam, S. P. Sailaja
4.	"Ee Buchi Babu"	S. P. Balasubramanyam
5.	"Akasanni Elea"	S. P. Balasubrahmanyam
6.	"Usuko Usuko"	K. S. Chitra

== Reception ==
K. Vijiyan from New Straits Times noted that the film "makes best of a weak story", praising the performances of Prashanth and Nassar. Malini Mannath of The Indian Express wrote, "S. D. Saba [..] handles the script and his artists with confidence and his narration is fairly neat." C. R. K. of Kalki praised the director, cinematographer and cast.
