= Dhilip Subbarayan =

Indian stunt choreographer

- Occupation: Stunt choreographer
- Years active: 2005–present
- Father: Super Subbarayan

Dhilip Subbarayan is an Indian stunt choreographer who has worked Tamil cinema and a few Telugu, Kannada and Malayalam films. The son of stunt choreographer Super Subbarayan, Dhilip also made his debut as a film producer with Anjala (2016) and also played the lead role in Sangu Chakkaram (2017).

== Career ==
Dhilip, the son of veteran stunt choreographer Super Subbarayan, has also worked in the same profession as his father, and first won notice for his work in Aaranya Kaandam (2011). He worked as assistant director to Pushkar–Gayathri in the film Oram Po and then He worked both as associate director and stunt master of movie Aaranya Kaandam, which was his debut (but Tamizh Padam released first).He has continued to associate with big and medium budget films in the Tamil and Malayalam film industry and has worked on productions including Arima Nambi (2014), Puli (2015), Naanum Rowdy Dhaan (2015) and Theri (2016). In late 2013, he launched his first film production, Anjala, though delays meant that the project only released in February 2016.

In February 2016, he began acting in his first lead role through the film Sangu Chakkaram. The film, described as a "spoof thriller", features Dhilip alongside Master Nishesh of Pasanga 2 and is directed by newcomer Maareesan, with music by Vishal Chandrasekhar.

== Filmography ==
=== Fight Master ===
List of Dhilip Subbarayan film credits
Year	Title	Language	Notes
2007	Oram Po	Tamil	
2010	Tamizh Padam	Tamil	
2010	Theeradha Vilayattu Pillai	Tamil	
2010	Kalavani	Tamil	
2010	Bale Pandiya	Tamil	
2010	Drohi	Tamil	
2010	Va	Tamil	
2010	Easan	Tamil	
2011	Thoonga Nagaram	Tamil	
2011	Aadu Puli	Tamil	
2011	Eththan	Tamil	
2011	Aaranya Kaandam	Tamil	Won Vijay Award for Best Stunt Director
2011	Udhayan	Tamil	
2011	Deiva Thirumagal	Tamil	
2011	Mudhal Idam	Tamil	
2011	Vaagai Sooda Vaa	Tamil	
2011	Vellore Maavattam	Tamil	
2011	Vithagan	Tamil	
2011	Poraali	Tamil	
2011	Mouna Guru	Tamil	
2012	Grandmaster	Malayalam	
2012	Attakathi	Tamil	
2012	Masters	Malayalam	
2012	Sundarapandian	Tamil	
2012	Pizza	Tamil	
2012	Naduvula Konjam Pakkatha Kaanom	Tamil	
2012	Aarohanam	Tamil	
2013	Puthagam	Tamil	
2013	Thira	Malayalam	Nominated for SIIMA Award for Best Malayalam Fight Choreographer
2013	Sillunu Oru Sandhippu	Tamil	
2013	Attahasa	Kannada	
2013	Udhayam NH4	Tamil	
2013	Naan Rajavaga Pogiren	Tamil	
2013	Kutti Puli	Tamil	
2013	Maryan	Tamil	
2013	Desingu Raja	Tamil	
2013	Raja Rani	Tamil	
2013	Naiyaandi	Tamil	
2013	Vanakkam Chennai	Tamil	
2013	Jannal Oram	Tamil	
2013	Naveena Saraswathi Sabatham	Tamil	
2013	Thagaraaru	Tamil	
2014	Jilla	Tamil	Additional Stunts
2014	Rummy	Tamil	
2014	Idhu Kathirvelan Kadhal	Tamil	
2014	Endrendrum	Tamil	
2014	Nedunchaalai	Tamil	
2014	Maan Karate	Tamil	Nominated for Edison Award for Best Stunt Director
2014	Oru Kanniyum Moonu Kalavaanikalum	Tamil	
2014	Naan Sigappu Manithan	Tamil	
2014	Vallavanukku Pullum Aayudham	Tamil	
2014	Yaamirukka Bayamey	Tamil	
2014	Manjapai	Tamil	
2014	Arima Nambi	Tamil	
2014	Sigaram Thodu	Tamil	
2014	Thirudan Police	Tamil	
2014	Ra	Tamil	
2014	Vellaikaara Durai	Tamil	
2015	Kaaki Sattai	Tamil	
2015	Komban	Tamil	
2015	Nannbenda	Tamil	
2015	Romeo Juliet	Tamil	
2015	Yagavarayinum Naa Kaakka	Tamil	
2015	Naalu Policeum Nalla Irundha Oorum	Tamil	
2015	Vaalu	Tamil	
2015	Thani Oruvan	Tamil	
2015	Puli	Tamil	
2015	Naanum Rowdythaan	Tamil	
2016	Visaranai	Tamil	
2016	Aarathu Sinam	Tamil	
2016	Kanithan	Tamil	
2016	Pokkiri Raja	Tamil	
2016	Pugazh	Tamil	
2016	Theri	Tamil	
2016	Vetrivel	Tamil	
2016	Manithan	Tamil	
2016	Pencil	Tamil	
2016	Enakku Innoru Per Irukku	Tamil	
2016	Tamilselvanum Thaniyar Anjalum	Tamil	
2016	Nambiyaar	Tamil	
2016	Enakku Veru Engum Kilaigal Kidayathu	Tamil	
2016	54321	Tamil	
2016	Kidaari	Tamil	
2016	Kammatipaadam	Malayalam	
2016	Veera Sivaji	Tamil	
2016	Balle Vellaiyathevaa	Tamil	
2017	Bogan	Tamil	
2017	Yaman	Tamil	
2017	Dora	Tamil	
2017	Kavan	Tamil	
2017	Kadamban	Tamil	
2017	Saravanan Irukka Bayamaen	Tamil	
2017	Sangili Bungili Kadhava Thorae	Tamil	
2017	Vikram Vedha	Tamil	
2017	Katha Nayagan	Tamil	
2017	Neruppu Da	Tamil	
2017	8 Thottakkal	Tamil	
2017	Ippadai Vellum	Tamil	
2017	Theeran Adhigaaram Ondru	Tamil	
2017	Kodi Veeran	Tamil	
2017	Balloon	Tamil	
2017	Sangu Chakkaram	Tamil	
2017	Ulkuthu	Tamil	
2018	Thaanaa Serndha Koottam	Tamil	
2018	Kammara Sambhavam	Malayalam	
2018	Irumbu Thirai	Tamil	
2018	Kaala: Karikaalan	Tamil	
2018	Semma Botha Aagathey	Tamil	
2018	Kadaikutty Singam	Tamil	
2018	Chekka Chivantha Vaanam	Tamil	
2018	Tamizh Padam 2	Tamil	
2018	Vada Chennai	Tamil	
2018	Andhra Mess	Tamil	
2018	Kallan	Tamil	
2018	Kayamkulam Kochunni	Malayalam	
2019	Yajamana	Kannada	
2019	Viswasam	Tamil	
2019	Mikhael	Malayalam	
2019	Devarattam	Tamil	
2019	100	Tamil	
2019	Nerkonda Paarvai	Tamil	
2019	Kuppathu Raja	Tamil	
2019	Naadodigal 2	Tamil	
2019	Kaappaan	Tamil	
2019	Kolaigaran	Tamil	
2019	Saaho	Telugu/Hindi	
2019	Chambal	Kannada	
2019	Hippi	Telugu	
2019	Namma Veettu Pillai	Tamil	
2019	Raajavamsam	Tamil	
2019	Bakrid	Tamil	
2019	Hero	Tamil	
2019	Thrissur Pooram	Malayalam	
2020	Pattas	Tamil	
2021	Yuvarathnaa	Kannada	
2021	Pulikkuthi Pandi	Tamil	
2021	Sulthan	Tamil	
2021	Karnan	Tamil	
2021	Netrikann	Tamil	
2021	Vaazhl	Tamil	
2021	Udanpirappe	Tamil	
2021	Annaatthe	Tamil	
2022	Valimai	Tamil	
2022	Salute	Malayalam	
2022	Kaathu Vaakula Rendu Kaadhal	Tamil	
2022	Cobra	Tamil	
2022	Trigger	Tamil	
2022	Naane Varuven	Tamil	
2022	Sardar	Tamil	
2023	Varisu	Tamil	
2023	Ponniyin Selvan: II	Tamil	
2023	Maamannan	Tamil	
2023	Mark Antony	Tamil	
2023	Bhola Shankar	Telugu	
2024	Captain Miller	Tamil	
2024	Rathnam	Tamil	
2024	The Greatest of All Time	Tamil	
2025	Kingston	Tamil	
2025	Hari Hara Veera Mallu: Part 1	Telugu	
2025	They Call Him OG	Telugu	
2025	Dragon (2025 film)	Tamil	
2025	Revolver Rita	Tamil	
2025	Madharaasi	Tamil	
2025	Bison Kaalamaadan	Tamil	
2026	Patriot (film)	Malayalam	
2026	Magudam (2026 film)	Tamil	
2026	Sardar 2	Tamil	
2026	Mandaadi	Tamil	
2026	Karathe Babu	Tamil	
2026	Biker (film)	Telugu	
2026	Lenin (film)	Telugu	

Key
†	Denotes films that have not yet been released

=== Actor ===
- 2011 Aaranya Kaandam
- 2015 Naanum Rowdy Dhaan
- 2017 Sangu Chakkaram
- 2017 Ulkuthu
- 2022 Putham Pudhu Kaalai Vidiyaadhaa
- 2022 Kaathuvaakula Rendu Kaadhal
- 2025 Bison Kaalamaadan

=== Producer ===
- 2016 Anjala
- 2017 Balloon
- 2024 Vaazhai

== Awards ==
- 2011 Vijay Award for Best Stunt Director - Aaranya Kaandam
- 2014 Tamil Nadu State Film Award for Best Stunt Coordinator - Manja Pai, Ra
- 2016 Ananda Vikatan Award for Best Stunt Director - Theri
- 2017 Ananda Vikatan Award for Best Stunt Director - Theeran Adhigaaram Ondru
- 2018 Ananda Vikatan Award for Best Stunt Director - Kaala: Karikaalan, Chekka Chivantha Vaanam and Vada Chennai
- 2018 Norway Tamil Film Festival Awards for Best Stunt Choreographer - Chekka Chivantha Vaanam
- 2022 Ananda Vikatan Award for Best Stunt Director - Valimai
