= Honest Raj =

1994 film by K. S. Ravi

- Theatrical release poster
- Directed by: K. S. Ravi
- Written by: M. S. Madhu (Dialogues)
- Screenplay by: K. S. Ravi
- Story by: K. S. Ravi
- Produced by: T. G. Thyagarajan
- Starring: Vijayakanth; Gautami; Aamani
- Cinematography: Ravi K. Chandran
- Edited by: Anil Malnad
- Music by: Ilaiyaraaja
- Production company: Sathya Jyothi Films
- Release date: 14 April 1994
- Running time: 140 minutes
- Country: India
- Language: Tamil

Honest Raj is a 1994 Indian Tamil-language action thriller film directed by K. S. Ravi. The film stars Vijayakanth, Gautami and Aamani, while Devan, Manorama, Senthil, Vijayakumar, and Nizhalgal Ravi play supporting roles. It marked the debut of cinematographer Ravi K. Chandran in Tamil cinema. The film, produced by G. Thyagarajan, was released on 14 April 1994 to positive reviews. The film was remade in Hindi as Rakshak (1996). This movie is a remake of the Hollywood movie Hard To Kill (1990).

== Plot ==
"Honest" Raj, a police officer in a coma for four years, wakes up suddenly. Abhinaya, a newly appointed doctor, saves him from a killer with the help of Raj's assistant Velu.

10 years ago, Raj lived with his mother Maragatham in Chennai. Maragatham was a Bank officer, and Raj was a graduate searching for a job. When Maragatham's Bank was taken hostage, Raj came to rescue and defeated the robbers. The City police reward him, and the commissioner asks him to attempt Public service exams for Indian Police Service. Raj complies and after the exams, mom-son duo visit Maragatham's native village for a vacation. Pushpa, a village girl, fell in love with Raj and they get engaged. Raj's best friend Varatha attempted to suicide after his father's creditors pressured him. Raj saved him, and Varatha lent his printing press company to Pazhani. Raj and Pushpa got married, and he passed the IPS exam successfully. Varatha found counterfeit money in his factory and started an illegal business with Pazhani. Bharatha then became rich and killed his partners.

Raj came back with his mother, wife, and son Babloo to see Varatha. Raj found an illegal business thanks to Kesavan, a former henchman of Varatha. Even though Varatha was his best friend, Raj tried to arrest him. Varatha soon killed his wife and mother. To save at least Babloo, Raj was hurt by bullets and lapsed into a coma. Gopalakrishnan, a veteran police officer, took care of Babloo.

Raj decides to take revenge and punish the culprit. Varatha kidnaps Babloo and threatens to kill him. Raj saves Babloo; kills Varatha, who does not want to surrender; and marries Abhinaya.

== Cast ==
- Vijayakanth as ASP "Honest" Raj IPS
- Gautami as Dr. Abhinaya
- Aamani as Pushpa
- Manorama as Maragatham, Raj's mother
- Devan as Varadharajan alias Varadha
- Senthil as Velu
- Vijayakumar as Gopalakrishnan, Raj's mentor and former Assistant Commissioner of Police
- Nizhalgal Ravi as Kesavan
- Ponnambalam as Pandian
- Ajay Rathnam as ACP Muthiah
- Madhan Bob as Varadharajan's PA
- Mohan Raman as Magistrate Mohandas
- Ganapathy Subramaniam Shanmugham as Bablu
- Vengal Rao as Fighter

== Soundtrack ==
The music was composed by Ilaiyaraaja, with lyrics written by Vaali.

Song	Singer(s)	Length
"Katuren Katuren"	S. P. Balasubrahmanyam	5:50
"Izuthu Potheena"	Mano, Janaki	4:45
"Katti Pudikkattma"	Janaki	5:42
"Vanil Vidivelli"	Mano, Janaki	5:48
"Day by Day"	Viji Thomas	5:14

== Release and reception ==
Honest Raj was released on 14 April 1994, during the Puthandu holiday. The film opened up against other films like Adharmam, Indhu, Sakthivel, Varavu Ettana Selavu Pathana and Veera. MM of The Indian Express wrote, "Ravi's tightly knit screenplay and deft handling [..] give an added dimension to the characters and make the film engrossing". K. Vijiyan of New Straits Times wrote, "Ravi's use of flashbacks and his treatment of the story lift this movie from ordinary and prevent it from turning dreary". Thulasi of Kalki called it a good Vijayakanth after a long time. Rocky Rajesh won the Tamil Nadu State Film Award for Best Stunt Coordinator.
