= Iru Sagodharigal =

- Poster
- Directed by: Vedantam Raghavayya
- Screenplay by: Vedantam Raghavayya
- Story by: V. Sadasivabrahmam
- Produced by: V. L. Narasu
- Starring: Gemini Ganesan; Savitri
- Cinematography: V. Kumaradevan
- Edited by: R. Hanumantha Rao
- Music by: S. Rajeswara Rao
- Production company: Narasu Studios
- Distributed by: Chamriya
- Release date: 23 August 1957
- Country: India
- Language: Tamil

Iru Sagodharigal (transl. Two Sisters) is a 1957 Indian Tamil-language drama film directed by Vedantam Raghavayya. The film stars Gemini Ganesan and Savithri. It was released on 23 August 1957. The film was simultaneously made into Telugu as Bhale Ammayilu.

== Plot ==
Saroja and Lalitha are sisters. They always quarrel with each other. Their mother tried her best to pacify them, but couldn't. Mother went sick and died.

Pancharatna Bhagavathar is a Dance and Music teacher. He helps the two sisters. He sends Lalitha to Chennai to continue her education in a college. He finds a job for Saroja at the residence of Bhoopathiya Pillai.

Doctor Sundaram, son of Bhoopathiya Pillai decides to leave the house due to ill-treatment by his step-mother. Saroja talks him into dropping his decision. Sundaram is attracted towards Saroja and wants to marry her.

Lalitha lost her money in Chennai. Vasudevan helps her. But he seduces her. He abandons Lalitha when she gives birth to a child.

Lalitha comes to Saroja's place with the child. Saroja is shocked to see her sister's plight. To save the family honour, Saroja leaves the house with Lalitha and goes elsewhere.

Sundaram searches for Saroja and finally finds her. But he sees that she is affectionate with a child. He mistakes her, changes his mind and goes away.

Saroja is in a quandary. She writes a letter to Bhagavathar to come and help them.

How she, with the help of Bhagavathar, finds Vasudevan and unites her sister with him and how she pacifies Sundaram and marries him forms the rest of the story.

== Cast ==
Adapted from the song book.

Male cast

- Gemini Ganesan as Sundar
- M. N. Nambiar as Vasudevan
- T. S. Durairaj as Pancharathna Bhagavathar
- V. K. Ramasamy as Subbaiah Pillai

Female cast

- Savitri as Saroja
- Girija as Lalitha
- T. P. Muthulakshmi as Ponnammal
- C. K. Saraswathi as Mangamma

Dance

- Padmini Priyadarshini

== Soundtrack ==
Music was composed by S. Rajeswara Rao and all lyrics were penned by Thanjai N. Ramaiah Dass.

| Song | Singer/s | Length |
|---|---|---|
| "Summa Saappida Vaanga" | Jikki | 03:01 |
| "Thaaye Un Seyalallavo" | M. L. Vasanthakumari & P. Leela | 04:53 |
| "Joraana Sarakkirukku Paarungga" | Thiruchi Loganathan | 04:08 |
| "Thanga Chilaiye Vaadaa" | P. Susheela | 03:25 |
| "Laatteriyaale Battri Polave" | Thiruchi Loganathan & Jikki | 03:21 |
| "Joraana Roobame" | P. Susheela | 03:09 |
| "Kaadhal Kannithidum Neratthile" | Jikki | 03:33 |
| "Ini Manam Pola Naame" | Ghantasala & P. Leela | 03:55 |
| "Oho Kaadhalinaal Pedhamillaadha" | P. Susheela | 03:52 |
| "Jigu Jigu Jinukkaa" | Jikki | 03:52 |
| "Thaam Thirana.... Viraga Nilaiyil" | M. L. Vasanthakumari & T. V. Rathnam | 5:17 |

== Reception ==
Kanthan of Kallki appreciated the film for the cast performances and lack of vulgarity.
