= Priyamudan =

1998 film by Vincent Selva

- Theatrical release poster
- Directed by: Vincent Selva
- Written by: Vincent Selva; Pattukkottai Prabakar (dialogues)
- Produced by: K. Muralidharan; V. Swaminathan; G. Venugopal
- Starring: Vijay; Kausalya
- Cinematography: S. D. Vijay Milton
- Edited by: B. S. Vasu-Saleem
- Music by: Deva
- Production company: Lakshmi Movie Makers
- Release date: 13 June 1998
- Running time: 156 minutes
- Country: India
- Language: Tamil

Priyamudan (transl. With love) is a 1998 Indian Tamil-language psychological romantic thriller film directed by Vincent Selva (in his directional debut). The film stars Vijay and Kausalya in the lead roles, with Sujith Sagar, Jai Ganesh and Nassar in supporting roles. It focuses on a young businessman, who is of a hyper-possessive nature and therefore he tries to achieve whatever he desires using any means.

Priyamudan was released on 13 June 1998 and became a commercial success, running for more than 100 days in theatres. It was remade as Preminche Manasu in Telugu in 1999, as Nata in Kannada in 2002 and as Deewana Main Deewana in Hindi in 2013.

== Plot ==
Vasanth is a son of a wealthy businessman from Chennai and grows up with a possessive attitude. In a gift shop, he breaks a gift which he likes only because it had already been bought by someone else. He pays the owner to cover the damages but responds that if he cannot get it, nobody can. He happens to visit Rajasthan, where he meets Priya and it is love at first sight for Vasanth. Priya is injured in an accident, and Vasanth's friend Vasanth Kumar rescues her by donating blood. Being unconscious, Priya does not know the face of her saviour, only the name "Vasanth Kumar".

After she recovers, Priya comes to Chennai to meet Vasanth Kumar and stays in her uncle's house. However, Vasanth, who needs her at any cost, pretends to be Vasanth Kumar and makes advantage of her soft corner. He also manages to hide her from Vasanth Kumar. One day, Priya and Vasanth go to Sathyam Theatre to enjoy a noon show together, but he unknowingly learns that Priya and Vasanth Kumar already know each other. He gets angry and breaks the ice creams brought for them.

One day, Vasanth Kumar learns about Priya's and Vasanth's affair and greets them. Priya's father Rangarajan also learns about the affair but not about the possessive Vasanth. Vasanth and Priya go to Jaipur from Chennai to meet Rangarajan. While Priya is away from the home for a small work, Vasanth meets Rangarajan and admits the truth to him, but he refuses. Angered by his action, Vasanth kills him but later realises his mistake. CBI officers Lawrence and Gopal begin to investigate the murder case.

One day, Vasanth Kumar comes to Jaipur for a music audition, which he had missed when he donated blood to Priya earlier. Vasanth arranges room for him to stay, but fears that he might find the truth. He goes to the same hospital where Priya was admitted and tears the certificate of her admission. Vasanth Kumar sees this, confronts Vasanth and they go to a nearby hill station. Vasanth Kumar starts arguing with Vasanth for misusing his name to love Priya. Vasanth apologises and admits the truth, but Vasanth Kumar abuses Priya. In anger, Vasanth accidentally beats Vasanth Kumar but tries to save him. Having no way, Vasanth Kumar sacrifices his life for his friend's sake. Shocked by this incident, Vasanth decides to transform himself into a good gentleman and thereby leaves his psychopath nature behind. Vasanth then sincerely starts to take care of Priya.

Meanwhile, Lawrence and Gopal come to know that the real murderer of Rangarajan and Vasanth Kumar is none other than Vasanth himself. Priya also learns about this and runs from Jaipur. Vasanth searches for her and is finally beaten by Priya for cheating her lover's name and for killing her father. After that, she notices her earring, which was taken by Vasanth when he first visited Jaipur. He tells her all the truths and the incidents. She feels sorry for him and decides to reciprocate his love. However, the police officers shoot Vasanth, and he dies immediately, unable to bear the pain. Priya bursts in tears after realising Vasanth's true love towards her. The film ends with a sad note with Vasanth advising the audience "not to live like him, because they will realize their terrific destiny".

Alternate climax

Vasanth falls unconscious after the gun shot. Priya who realised Vasanth's love cries thinking that he died, but her tears falls on Vasanth's cheek, making him gain consciousness. Priya helps Vasanth to stand and reciprocates his love. Both run away from the police. Lawrence and Gopal who were about to pull out their guns from the holsters, do not stop or shoot Vasanth from escaping. When they ask each other the reason for not stopping them, they explained each other by saying that they know the value and pain of love. They let them go away and live together.

== Cast ==
- Vijay as Vasanth
- Kausalya as Priya
- Sujith Sagar as Vasanth Kumar
- Jai Ganesh as Rangarajan, Priya's father
- Nassar as CBI officer Lawrence
- Manivannan as House Owner
- Madhan Bob as Priya's uncle
- K. P. Mohan as Vasanth's father
- S. A. Chandrasekhar as CBI officer Gopal
- S. N. Surendar as Gaffar
- T. P. Gajendran as Lawrence's assistant
- Azhagu as Ravi
- Thideer Kannaiah as House Broker
- Jaguar Thangam in a special appearance
- Vincent Selva in a special appearance

== Production ==
Vijay wanted to work with a debutant director and Vincent Selva's story impressed him, prompting Lakshmi Movie Makers to make the story into a feature film, Priyamudan. Vijay reduced his remuneration for the film, anticipating potential cost overruns. Meena was initially approached for the film, but had to turn the offer down due to her busy schedule. The filming was held at Jaipur for one month. During filming, Vijay suffered a spinal injury. As a result, he travelled to London for advanced medical treatment, where he ended up meeting his eventual wife, Sangeetha Sornalingam. An alternate climax was filmed where Vijay's character does not die, but Selva decided against using it.

== Soundtrack ==
The soundtrack was composed by Deva. The audio rights were acquired by Five Star Audio and Sony Music India. The song "Hello Maruthi" is based on Boney M.'s version of "Brown Girl in the Ring". The song "White Lakkan" is based on the Hindi song "Hum Kaale Hai Tu Kya Hua" from Gumnaam (1965), composed by the duo Shankar–Jaikishan.

Track listing
| No. | Title | Lyrics | Singer(s) | Length |
|---|---|---|---|---|
| 1. | "Bharathikku Kannamma" | Ra. Ravishankar | S. P. Balasubrahmanyam | 5:24 |
| 2. | "Aakasavani" | Arivumathi | Hariharan | 5:31 |
| 3. | "Pooja Vaa" | Palani Bharathi | S. P. Balasubrahmanyam, K. S. Chithra | 6:12 |
| 4. | "Hello Maruthi" | Vaasan | Mano, Gopal Rao | 6:11 |
| 5. | "White Lakkan" | Ponniyin Selvan | Deva | 4:32 |
| 6. | "Bharathikku Kannamma" | Ra. Ravishankar | P. Unnikrishnan | 5:24 |
| 7. | "Mouriya" | Palani Bharathi | Vijay, Anuradha Sriram | 4:48 |
| 8. | "White Lakkan" | Ponniyin Selvan | Krishna Raj | 4:32 |
| Total length: | | | | 42:35 |

== Release and reception ==
The film was released on 13 June 1998. D. S. Ramanujam of The Hindu stated that Vijay "made sincere efforts to give shape to the negative character" that "he asserts himself in the climax". Ramanujam added that Kausalya "just fills the bill, while Sujit Sagar makes "a neat essay". K. N. Vijiyan of New Straits Times also gave a positive review, comparing Vijay favourably to Kamal Haasan's performance in Sigappu Rojakkal (1978), and also praising Milton's cinematography and Deva's music. Ananda Vikatan gave the film a score of 41 out of 100. Ji of Kalki praised the performances of Vijay, Kausalya, and Pattukottai Prabhakar's dialogues but felt Nassar was wasted and panned Deva's music and the dance choreography. Stunt choreographer Jaguar Thangam won the Tamil Nadu State Film Award for Best Stunt Coordinator for his work in Priyamudan.
