= Julieum 4 Perum =

- Directed by: R. V. Satheesh
- Starring: Amudhavanan; George Vijay Nelson; R. V. Satheesh; Yoganand; Alya Manasa
- Cinematography: K. A. Win Baskar
- Edited by: Sharan Shanmugam; V.A. Mazhai Dassan
- Music by: Raghu Sravan Kumar
- Production companies: Kaaviya Cinemas; Reach Media Solutions
- Release date: 7 April 2017
- Country: India
- Language: Tamil

Julieum 4 Perum (transl. Julie and Four People) is a 2017 Indian Tamil-language comedy drama film written and directed by R. V. Satheesh. The film features Amudhavanan, George Vijay Nelson, R. V. Satheesh, Yoganand, and Alya Manasa in the lead roles, while Mahanadi Shankar and Jaguar Thangam play supporting roles. The music was composed by Raghu Sravan Kumar with cinematography by K. A. Win Baskar. The film began production during early 2016 and was released on 7 April 2017.

== Cast ==
- Julie as Julie
- Amudhavanan as Muthu
- George Vijay Nelson
- R. V. Satheesh as David
- Yoganand as Pandi
- Alya Manasa as Manisha
- Reena
- Mahanadi Shankar as Ediyamen
- Youdish Shivan
- Jaguar Thangam
- Billy Murali
- Ghilli Maran
- Homaay
- Vengal Rao as Inspector Thiagarajan
- Baby Dhaksini
- Krishna Kumar
- Sivaranjini
- S. Kamal Kumar
- Sandy as Dimple Raj
- Durai Sudhakar as Unmai Selvan

== Production ==
R. V. Satheesh left his corporate job in the US to attempt to make it as a film maker in Tamil cinema and trained under R. Parthiepan. The director revealed that the film would revolve around a "dognapping" and would focus on the situational comedy of the incident, with his dog named Lucky playing a pivotal role. The idea for the film was based upon the widespread dognapping which hard occurred in California during 2014. Television actor Amudhavanan was selected to play a leading role, while George Vijay Nelson, previously seen in Mani Ratnam's Kadal (2013) and Balaji Mohan's Maari (2015), was also picked for a lead role.

== Soundtrack ==
Julieum 4 Perum

Soundtrack album by Raghu Sravan Kumar
- Released: 5 September 2016
- Recorded: 2016
- Language: Tamil
- Label: Trend Music South
- Producer: Raghu Sravan Kumar
External audio
- Audio Jukebox on YouTube

The film's music was composed by Raghu Sravan Kumar, while the audio rights of the film was acquired by Trend Music South. The album released on 5 September 2016 and featured five songs.

Track list
No.	Title	Lyrics	Singer(s)	Length
1.	"Chennaivaasi"	G. G. Ganesh	Madhan Rapking, Raghu Sravan Kumar	3:47
2.	"Naalukaalu"	G. G. Ganesh	Gana Bala	3:02
3.	"Haikoo"	Madhan Raj	Akshaya Ramnath	4:40
4.	"Noothukku Noor"	G. G. Ganesh	Madhan Rapking	0:58
5.	"CMBT Comingu"	Madhan Raj	Baby Dakshini, SSB, Madhan Rapking, Raghu Sravan Kumar	3:16

== Release ==
The film opened on 7 April 2017 across Tamil Nadu alongside Mani Ratnam's Kaatru Veliyidai. The Times of India wrote "right from the writing to the filmmaking, this film has amateurishness written all over it" and that "every scene is so silly, infantile and preposterous (all in a bad way) that we keep wondering how someone felt that this could be a movie". A critic from The New Indian Express wrote "a small budgeted film, the production values are low and this is evident throughout" but added it is "mildly amusing, what the film needed was a screenplay that had more punch and fizz in it" and "at the most, Julieum… is a promising effort by a debutant maker".
