= Sooriyanum Sooriyagandhiyum =

2024 Indian Tamil-language drama film directed by A. L. Raja

- Directed by: A. L. Raja
- Written by: A. L. Raja
- Starring: Appukutty; Rathi Umayal; Srihari; Santhana Bharathi
- Cinematography: Thiruvarur Raja
- Edited by: Veerasenthil Raj
- Music by: RS Ravipriyan
- Production company: D.D Cinema Studio
- Release date: 9 August 2024
- Country: India
- Language: Tamil

Sooriyanum Sooriyagandhiyum (transl. Sun and the Sunflower) is a 2024 Indian Tamil-language drama film written and directed by A. L. Raja and the film was bankrolled by D. D. Cinema Studio. The film stars Appukutty, Rathi Umayal, Srihari, Santhana Bharathi, Lollu Sabha Seshu in the pivotal roles. The film had its theatrical release on 9 August 2024.

== Synopsis ==
An aspiring young filmmaker (Appukutty) is plying his trade to materialise his dream of becoming an independent film director in his own ways and the dreams of him have been long plagued as his ambitious efforts to pursue greener pastures have always become futile leading to him being distraught and agonizing with zero hopes. Appukutty apparently finally has the last laugh as when it seemed all over for him in terms of reviving his dreams of foraying into cinema field, he gets a slice of luck after meeting producer Santha Bharathi in a serendipitous occasion. Appukutty then showcases his storytelling abilities by narrating the script to the producer where the former apparently gives his input by how casteism and honor killing are induced in the society by some individuals with vested interests to achieve their agenda of causing problems among lovers.

== Cast ==
- Appukutty
- Rathi Umayal
- Srihari
- Santhana Bharathi
- Lollu Sabha Seshu
- Mangalanathan Gurukkal
- Udumalai Ravi
- Sakthi Soruban
- Rajasimman
- Mippuswamy

== Production ==
The film was announced by A. L. Raja and it marked A. L. Raja's third directorial venture after Ninaikkatha Naalillai (2001), and Theekuchi (2008). The film was predominantly shot and set in across various locations in Tamil Nadu including Madurai, Thiruvannamalai, Theni and Dindigul. The principal photography of the film wrapped up with a total shooting schedule of 35 days. The film was inaugurated by Chief Minister of the Union Territory of Puducherry, N. Rangaswamy.

The director of the film A. L. Raja blew things out of proportion by hyping up the film prior to its anticipated theatrical release by promoting the film as a potential candidate that could fetch Appukutty another national award. A. L. Raja also told press media that Appukutty's character arc would be a huge talking point among general audience after the theatrical release.

== Theme ==
The theme of the film tackled the subject matter pertaining to the harsh realities and plight faced by the goal oriented individuals due to the prevalence of social stigma, stereotypes and caste differences while trying to enforce the consequences that could be faced due to persisting with regressive mindset on caste differences. The film gives insightful thought process on how the leaps and bounds are confronted by such individuals in order for them to make a resilient rapid turnaround in their lives in a way of a redemption arc to culminate in a rags to riches scenario to reach the pinnacle. The film describes about how in this current day and age, (with already people vying for spots fuelled by the rat race mentality), caste is still given paramount importance, despite a tremendous rapid transformation as far as civilization aspects are concerned and the film inculcates about how caste is treated as inevitable part of everyone's life despite knowing full well about the demerits and cons of prioritizing caste as it corners talented individuals from fulfilling their objectives.
