= Othaiyadi Paathayilae =

- Directed by: A. S. Prakasam
- Written by: A. S. Prakasam
- Produced by: Judo Rathnam
- Starring: Ganesh; Pournami
- Cinematography: Lakshman Gore
- Edited by: Thirunavukkarasu
- Music by: Shankar–Ganesh
- Production company: S. V. R. Enterprises
- Release date: 1980
- Country: India
- Language: Tamil

Othaiyadi Paathayilae (transl. In Narrow Paths) is a 1980 Indian Tamil-language film written and directed by A. S. Prakasam. The film stars Ganesh, one half of the Shankar–Ganesh music composing duo, in his acting debut, and Pournami.

== Plot ==
The beloved postman of a village falls in love with a doctor. Meanwhile, he gets into trouble with a gang of bandits and fights them to save the villagers.

== Cast ==
- Ganesh
- Pournami
- Jakku
- Maya
- Nalini
- Isari Velan

== Production ==
Ganesh, one half of the Shankar–Ganesh music composing duo, made his acting debut. The film was produced by Judo Rathnam.

== Soundtrack ==
The music was composed by Shankar–Ganesh.

Track listing
No.	Title	Lyrics	Singer(s)	Length
1.	"Vellarikka"	Pulamaipithan	Malaysia Vasudevan	4:31
2.	"Jigu Jiguchan"	Pulamaipithan	S. Janaki	3:43
3.	"Cheppukkudam"	A. S. Prakasam	Vani Jairam, K. J. Yesudas	5:43
4.	"Un Ennamthan"	Gangai Amaran	S. Janaki	4:35
Total length:				18:32

== Reception ==
Ananda Vikatan felt the film was like a mixture of Rosappu Ravikkaikari (1979), Pournami Nilavil (1980) and story of Bakasuran while criticising Prakasam's imagination, vulgarity and double meaning dialogues. Kalki gave the film a negative review, criticising Prakasam's writing, direction, and Ganesh's performance.
