= Thadaiyara Thaakka =

2012 Indian film by Magizh Thirumeni

- Theatrical release poster
- Directed by: Magizh Thirumeni
- Written by: Magizh Thirumeni
- Produced by: N. S. Mohan; Susil Mohan; M. Hemanth
- Starring: Arun Vijay; Mamta Mohandas
- Cinematography: M. Sukumar
- Edited by: Praveen K. L. N. B. Srikanth
- Music by: Thaman S
- Production company: Feather Touch Entertainment
- Release date: 1 June 2012
- Running time: 129 minutes
- Country: India
- Language: Tamil

Thadaiyara Thaakka (transl. Breaking all Barriers) is a 2012 Indian Tamil-language action thriller film written and directed by Magizh Thirumeni. The film stars Arun Vijay and Mamta Mohandas, with Rakul Preet Singh, Maha Gandhi and Vamsi Krishna in supporting roles. The title is derived from the devotional song Kanda Shasti Kavasam.

Thadaiyara Thaakka was released theatrically on 1 June 2012, and received positive critical reviews but underperformed at the box office, which Magizh attributed to the low-key promotions and publicity. The film slowly gained praise from viewers after the end of its theatrical run. During an interview for Yennai Arindhaal (2015), Arun called it as the best film in his career to that point.

== Plot ==
Selva is a self-built man who owns a small travel agency in Chennai, and works hard to achieve something in life. He is all set to marry his lover Priya. The city is under the grip of dreaded loan shark brothers Maha and Kumar who would go to any extent to wield their clout in the city. During a rainy night, Selva comes across a drunk Maha, and within minutes, Maha is killed in mysterious circumstances. The blame falls on Selva. Kumar and his men want to bump off Selva. A perplexed Selva runs for cover. He sets out to find the real killer.

In the past, Maha had abducted Gayathri Ramakrishnan, the only daughter of a wealthy Delhi-based businessman and has been using her solely as his personal slave for 9 months, revolting on the thought that even the richest and most powerful men in the country cannot touch her. One rainy night, Gayathri escapes captivity and comes across the intoxicated Maha sitting on the road. She uses the chance to exact vengeance and kills him. Her helper at home discreetly (but unintentionally) places the murder weapon in Selva's car, so Selva is framed.

In the present, Selva's two friends are taken captive. One of them is killed off brutally by Kumar and the other is set to be killed if Selva does not surrender to Kumar that night. Selva's travel agency is also destroyed by Kumar's men, and Priya's family escapes the city to save themselves. With his entire life turned around by a crime he did not commit, Selva takes a new avatar as he decides to wage a bloody war with the gangsters where he kills Kumar and the 8 members of his gang. To dispose of the bodies, he uses a meat grinder overnight and feeds the flesh to the pigs. Though Selva and Priya take care of Gayathri, she discovers that she is pregnant with Maha's child. At the same time, Selva and Priya learns of Gayathri's origins from the TV news. But Gayathri commits suicide.

== Cast ==
- Arun Vijay as Selva
- Mamta Mohandas as Priya
- Rakul Preet Singh as Gayathri Ramakrishnan
- Maha Gandhi as Maha
- Vamsi Krishna as Kumar
- Aruldoss as Karikkadai Sekar
- Murugadoss as Velu
- Kaali Venkat as Alphonse
- M. G. Lohanathan as Senthil
- Aarthi as Priya's friend
- C. K. Jeeva as Priya's father
- Rintu Roy as Priya's mother
- Sneha as Priya's sister
- Ramya as Ramya
- Arputhan Vijay as Abhishek
- Debi Dutta in a special appearance in song "Naan Poonthamalli" (uncredited)

== Production ==
=== Development ===
Magizh Thirumeni conceived the idea for Thadaiyara Thaakka when he was bedridden with viral fever and took seven years to develop the story and characters. The title, derived from a line from the devotional song Kanda Shasti Kavasam, was initially suggested by Magizh to the director Gautham Vasudev Menon for the film which was later titled Vettaiyaadu Vilaiyaadu (2006). M. Sukumar was hired as the cinematographer of Thadaiyara Thaakka, while Praveen K. L. and N. B. Srikanth jointly edited the film. Anal Arasu was hired as the action choreographer.

=== Casting ===
Magizh wanted an actor apt for this kind of action film; a protagonist with the boy next door looks and demeanor. Arun Vijay was chosen for the role after being introduced to Magizh by a mutual friend. Bollywood actress Prachi Desai was first chosen as the lead female role, signing her first Tamil project, with sources claiming that she was paid ₹15 million (equivalent to ₹28 million or US$290,000 in 2023) as remuneration. Despite having signed up, Desai failed to turn up for shooting, delaying the filming, and was removed from the project. Malayali singer-actress Mamta Mohandas replaced her, making Thadaiyara Thaakka her third Tamil film. Prior to Mamta's entry, Kannada film actress Nidhi Subbaiah reportedly was considered as Desai's replacement. Rakul Preet Singh, Femina Miss India 2011 contestant, who previously had starred in a Kannada film, was selected for another pivotal female role. Magizh introduced Telugu actor Vamsi Krishna and debutante Maha Gandhi as the antagonists.

=== Filming ===
Some scenes of the film were shot at Border Thottam, at night. Arun Vijay stated that the film was primarily shot in night at second half. The team chose Mumbai based model Debi Dutta for the kuthu number "Poondhamalli Dhaan". The track was canned in TR Gardens in an enormous set resembling the famous Zam Bazaar at nights on a grand scale with 50 dancers and 150 junior artists. It was choreographed by Noble Master. Arun Vijay had developed a six-pack for this film. Rain had delayed the schedule and pushed back the release.

The crew shot the climax at the Binny Mills for nine days. A factory set was erected with 15 feet fenced compound worth ₹4.5 million (equivalent to ₹8.5 million or US$88,000 in 2023). Art director Mohana Mahendran tried to find a live location, but since he was not satisfied, the team erected a set of an old abandoned factory with machinery. In a scene featuring Arun Vijay, Vamsi and his gang was shot there. Anal Arasu composed a lengthy shot that was canned with four cameras. During the take, Vamsi had to swing a huge iron bar against Arun Vijay in the end, where Arun has to miss it and jump. However, the iron bar slipped from Vamsi's hand and hit Arun's shoulder. Shoot was wrapped with few shots remaining.

== Soundtrack ==
Soundtrack was composed by Thaman S. Arun Vijay had sung few lines for a folk-song with L. R. Eswari. The audio was launched in early October 2013. Mamta Mohandas and Rakul Preet Singh were notably absent from the event. Karthik Srinivasan of Milliblog wrote: "Short, tuneful soundtrack by Thaman who gets the melodies right and the sole kuthu wrong".

Song	Singers	Lyrics
"Kelaamale"	Aalap Raju, Rita	Madhan Karky
"Kelaamale" (Unplugged)	Thaman S, Rita	Madhan Karky
"Kaalangal"	Chinmayi, Javed Ali	Madhan Karky
"Naan Poonthamalli"	L. R. Eswari, Solar Sai, Arun Vijay	Vaali
"Theme Music" (Instrumental)	-	-

== Release and reception ==
Thadaiyara Thaakka was released theatrically on 1 June 2012. Sidharth Varma of The Times of India gave the film 2.5 out of 5 stars and wrote "Thadaiyara Thaakka at most times is grey and there is always a sense of anticipation as to what would happen next." Sify wrote, "On the whole Magizh Thirumeni has made a fast paced thriller which has essential speed to keep the audience hooked". The film was also reviewed by Ananda Vikatan, and Kungumam. Despite receiving mostly positive reviews, the film underperformed at the box office, which Magizh attributed to the low-key promotions and publicity. The film slowly gained praise from viewers after the end of its theatrical run.
