= Rocky Rajesh =

Indian fight master/action choreographer (born 1961)

- Born: Rajesh; 1961 (age 64–65); Tamil Nadu, India
- Occupation: Fight Master
- Years active: 1984-present

Rocky Rajesh (born as Rajesh) is an Indian fight master, mainly in Tamil cinema also in Malayalam, Kannada & Telugu cinema industries of India. He did the stunts for Khokababu The Hindu said that his stunt work in the film Daas "looks so dangerous that it is ludicrous when the hero escapes with bruises." and that his work for Vallarasu was one of the assets of the film. He has worked with actor Vijayakanth in many films. Fight masters & Actors like Ponnambalam, Ram Laxman, Stun Siva, Anbariv, Thavasiraj, Vicky, Mirattal Selva, Ghilli Sekar, Rajesh Kanna & Vengal Rao have worked as fighters and assistants to him. His son Thamizh is an actor who made his debut in the film Aimbulan.

== Filmography ==
=== Fight Master ===
Films

- 1991 Moondrezhuthil En Moochirukkum
- 1992 Chinna Gounder
- 1992 Bharathan
- 1992 Chembaruthi
- 1992 Thai Mozhi
- 1992 Pangali
- 1993 Kovil Kaalai
- 1993 Yejaman
- 1993 Mafia (Malayalam)
- 1993 Ezhai Jaathi
- 1993 Enga Thambi
- 1993 Ponnumani
- 1993 Sakkarai Devan
- 1993 Rajadurai
- 1993 Enga Muthalali
- 1993 Senthoorapandi
- 1993 Jackpot (Malayalam)
- 1994 Vishnu (Malayalam)
- 1994 Sethupathi IPS
- 1994 Honest Raj
- 1994 Duet
- 1994 Pathavi Pramanam
- 1994 Senthamizh Selvan
- 1994 Pidakkozhi Koovunna Noottandu (Malayalam)
- 1994 En Aasai Machan
- 1994 Sathyavan
- 1994 Periya Marudhu
- 1995 Karuppu Nila
- 1995 Thirumoorthy
- 1995 Rani Maharani
- 1995 Gandhi Pirantha Mann
- 1995 Raasaiyya
- 1995 Karma (Malayalam)
- 1996 Thayagam
- 1996 Aavathum Pennale Azhivathum Pennale
- 1996 Tamizh Selvan
- 1996 Priyam
- 1996 Alexander
- 1996 Kalapani (Malayalam)
- 1997 Dharma Chakkaram
- 1997 Gopura Deepam
- 1997 Vaimaye Vellum
- 1997 Mannava
- 1997 Vivasaayi Magan
- 1997 Dhinamum Ennai Gavani
- 1997 Pagaivan
- 1997 Arasiyal
- 1998 Ulavuthurai
- 1998 Kadhal Mannan
- 1998 Harichandra
- 1998 Sandhippoma
- 1998 Dharma
- 1998 Poonthottam
- 1998 Kalyana Galatta
- 1998 Aasai Thambi
- 1998 Veeram Vilanja Mannu
- 1998 Sooryaputhran (Malayalam)
- 1999 Suriya Paarvai
- 1999 Kallazhagar
- 1999 Ethirum Pudhirum
- 1999 Periyanna
- 1999 Kannupada Poguthaiya
- 1999 Azhagarsamy
- 2000 Vanathai Pola
- 2000 Vallarasu
- 2000 James Pandu
- 2000 Simmasanam
- 2000 Kannukku Kannaga
- 2000 Anbudan
- 2000 Valliettan (Malayalam)
- 2001 Vaanchinathan
- 2001 Dhill
- 2001 Narasimha
- 2002 Game
- 2003 Dhool
- 2003 Chokka Thangam
- 2003 Vaseegara
- 2003 Thennavan
- 2004 Engal Anna
- 2004 Jai
- 2004 Campus
- 2004 Ghilli
- 2004 Arasatchi
- 2004 Gajendra
- 2004 Neranja Manasu
- 2005 Thirupaachi
- 2005 Daas
- 2005 Sivakasi
- 2005 Aaru
- 2006 Aathi
- 2006 Sudesi
- 2006 Perarasu
- 2006 Dharmapuri
- 2006 Thiruvilaiyaadal Aarambam
- 2007 Thaamirabharani
- 2007 Payum Puli (Malayalam)
- 2007 Sabari
- 2007 Madurai Veeran
- 2007 Vel
- 2008 Kuruvi
- 2008 Arasangam
- 2008 Pattaya Kelappu
- 2008 Seval
- 2008 Kabadi Kabadi (Malayalam)
- 2008 Mahesh, Saranya Matrum Palar
- 2009 Mariyadhai
- 2009 Thoranai
- 2009 Engal Aasan
- 2009 Azhagar Malai
- 2009 Thamizhagam
- 2010 Aimbulan
- 2010 Kanagavel Kaaka
- 2010 Singam
- 2010 Thillalangadi
- 2010 Virudhagiri
- 2011 Ilaignan
- 2011 Mambattiyan
- 2011 Shatru (Bengali)
- 2012 Aravaan
- 2012 Bojhena Shey Bojhena (Bengali)
- 2013 Singam II
- 2013 Deewana (Bengali)
- 2013 Kanamachi (Bengali)
- 2015 Ami Shudhu Cheyechi Tomay (Bengali)
- 2015 Besh Korechi Prem Korechi (Bengali)
- 2015 Pulan Visaranai 2
- 2015 Hero Girl (Bengali)
- 2015 Black (Bengali)
- 2015 Sagaptham
- 2015 Strawberry
- 2016 Badsha - The Don (Bengali)
- 2016 Abhimaan (Bengali)
- 2016 Love Express (Bengali)
- 2017 Satya (Bhojpuri)
- 2018 Sultan: The Saviour (Bengali)
- 2018 Naqaab (Bengali)
- 2018 En Sangathu Aala Adichavan Evanda
- 2019 Ottradal
- 2019 Kidnap (Bengali)
- 2020 Kadamaan Paarai
- 2025 Thuchaadhanan

Television

- 2018 Chandrakumari

=== Actor ===
- 1993 Enga Thambi as Rocky Rajesh (in a special appearance as a Henchman)
- 1998 Kalyana Galatta as Henchman (special appearance)
- 1999 Kallazhagar as Thief (special appearance)
- 1999 Periyanna as Henchman (special appearance)
- 2000 James Pandu as Referee (special appearance)
- 2004 Gajendra as Henchman
- 2005 Maayavi as Himself (special appearance)
- 2006 Aadhi as Thappu Player (special appearance)
- 2006 Dharmapuri as Police Commissioner (special appearance)
- 2008 Suryaa as Raja (special appearance)
- 2009 Thamizhagam as Police Inspector
- 2025 Coolie as Coolie

== Awards ==
Won

- 1992 Tamil Nadu State Film Award for Best Stunt Coordinator - Chinna Gounder & Chembaruthi
- 1994 Tamil Nadu State Film Award for Best Stunt Coordinator - Honest Raj
- 1997 Cinema Express Award for Best Stunt Master - Dharma Chakkaram

Nominated

- 2013 South Indian International Movie Awards for Best Fight Choreographer - Singam II
- 2013 Vijay Award for Best Stunt Director - Singam II
