= Chasing (2021 film) =

Indian Tamil language action Thriller crime film

- Directed by: K. Veerakumar
- Written by: Pon Parthiban (dialogue)
- Produced by: Mathialagan Muniandy
- Starring: Varalaxmi Sarathkumar; Mathialagan Muniandy; Super Subbarayan
- Cinematography: E. Krishnasamy
- Edited by: K. Balasubramanium
- Music by: Thasi
- Production company: Asia Sin Media
- Release date: 16 April 2021
- Running time: 110 minutes
- Country: India
- Language: Tamil

Chasing is a 2021 Indian Tamil-language action crime film written and directed by Veerakumar on his directorial debut. The film features Varalaxmi Sarathkumar in the lead role. The film had a theatrical release on 16 April 2021. It received negative reviews.

== Plot ==
Athira (Varalaxmi Sarathkumar) is seen chasing goons and drug peddlers in different locations. The film opens with the kidnapping of a girl who gets rescued by Athira in a few minutes, followed by an investigation.

== Cast ==
- Varalaxmi Sarathkumar as Athira
- Mathialagan Muniandy
- Super Subbarayan as Padikuthan
- Bala Saravanan as Rocky
- Imman Annachi as Police constable
- Sona Heiden as Sona
- Sankar Guru Raja as Police commissioner
- Jerald as Jerald
- Yamuna Chinnadurai

== Production ==
Principal photography of the film began during April 2019 in Malacca, Malaysia. A first look poster for the film was released to mark Tamil New Year 2019. For the film, Varalaxmi filmed seven separate action scenes.

A theatrical trailer of the film was released in November 2020 by director Bharathiraja.

== Release ==
The film had a theatrical release on 16 April 2021. A reviewer from Cinema Express wrote Chasing is "an awful, loud cop film with not a shred of logic" and that "with writing that's all over the place, the film fails in every possible way". A reviewer from Times of India noted "the film, which lacks thrills, adequate character detailing and engaging narration, is a forgettable snooze fest".
