= Sangu Chakkaram =

2017 Indian film by Maarison

- Theatrical release poster
- Directed by: Maarison
- Produced by: K.Sathish, V.S.Rajkumar
- Starring: Punnagai Poo Gheetha; Baby Monika; Dhilip Subbarayan; N. Raja; Pradeep K. Vijayan
- Cinematography: Ravi Kannan
- Edited by: Vijay Velukutty
- Music by: Shabir
- Production companies: Cinemawala Pictures, Leo Visions, Diya Movies
- Release date: 29 December 2017
- Country: India
- Language: Tamil

Sangu Chakkaram (transl. Chunk wheel) is a 2017 Indian Tamil-language fantasy comedy film directed by Maarison, starring stunt master Dhilip Subbarayan, Punnagai Poo Gheetha, N.Raja, Pradeep, Jeremy Roske, Nishesh, Monicka, Swaksha, Abinethra, Krithik, Adharrsh, Bala, Aditya, Tejo, and Ajeesh. The film was dubbed into Hindi as Mahal Ke Andar.

== Cast ==
- Swaksha as Jennifer
- Punnagai Poo Gheetha as Angayakanni
- Baby Monika as Malar
- Dhilip Subbarayan as Aagayam
- N. Raja as D'Souza
- Pradeep K Vijayan as Arivazhagan
- Vinothkumar as Land grabber
- Avan Ivan Ramaraj as Cotton candy seller
- Rocky as Lover
- Meghna as Lover
- Jeremy Roske as Capoeira
- Joel Sangiliyana as Asian exorcist
- Mangalanathan Gurukkal as Exorcist
- Ramki as Exorcist's assistant
- Nishesh as Tamil
- Abinithra as Deepa
- Krithik as Rajesh
- Adharrsh as Darwin
- Bala as Mujeeb
- Aditya as Karthi
- Tejo as Rahul
- Ajeesh
- Prashanth Rangaswamy as Police officer

== Production ==
Sangu Chakkaram is a fantasy-comedy film made with kids.

== Release ==
The film is planned to release in the first week of July 2017 however it got released in December 2017. The satellites rights of the film were sold to Sun TV

=== Critical reception ===
The Times of India wrote "Given that the horror-comedy wave is now at its ebb, Sanguchakkaram feels late by at least two-three years. It doesn't help that Maarison deals mostly with cliches to tell us his story." New Indian Express wrote "Sangu Chakkaram offers nothing radical in terms of story, but there are certain redemptive moments".
