= Surya (2008 film) =

- Directed by: Jaguar Thangam
- Written by: Jaguar Thangam
- Produced by: Santhi Jaguar Thangam
- Starring: Vijaya Chiranjeevi; Keerthi Chawla
- Cinematography: R. H. Ashok
- Music by: Jerome Pushparaj
- Production company: JVR Film Makers
- Release date: 5 December 2008
- Country: India
- Language: Tamil

Surya is a 2008 Indian Tamil-language action film, written and directed by stunt master Jaguar Thangam, in his directorial debut. The film stars his son debutant Vijaya Chiranjeevi and Keerthi Chawla. The film received extremely negative reviews from critics. This movie was dubbed in Hindi as Surakshaa - One Challenger Hero and it was distributed by Shemaroo Entertainment.

== Cast ==
- Vijaya Chiranjeevi as Surya
- Keerthi Chawla
- Neepa
- Vijayakumar as Surya's father
- Bose Venkat
- Meera Krishnan as Surya's mother
- Kiranmai as Surya's Sister
- Mayilsamy
- Ponnambalam
- Karate Raja as Police Officer
- Muthukaalai as Surya's friend
- T. P. Gajendran as himself
- Ganesh Babu
- Bava Lakshmanan
- Meesai Rajendranath as Police Officer
- Siva Narayana Murthy as Police Officer
- Vijay Ganesh as Thief

== Production ==
The film was launched on 10 February 2006 at AVM Studios.

== Soundtrack ==
Soundtrack was composed by Jerome Pushparaj.

- "Veeradhi Veeranada" — Tippu
- "Vettaiyaada Vaada" — Girish, Vinaya
- "Sammadhama" — Shalini, Karthi
- "Padaiyedu" — Tippu, Mervin
- "Theme Music"

== Reception ==
Kanmani of Kalki called Vijaya Chiranjeevi's stunts, stunt choreography, Vadivelu Ganesh's humour as positive points but called Vijaya Chiranjeevi's acting, editing, music, loop holes in screenplay as negatives.
