= Jaguar Thangam =

Indian Tamil actor

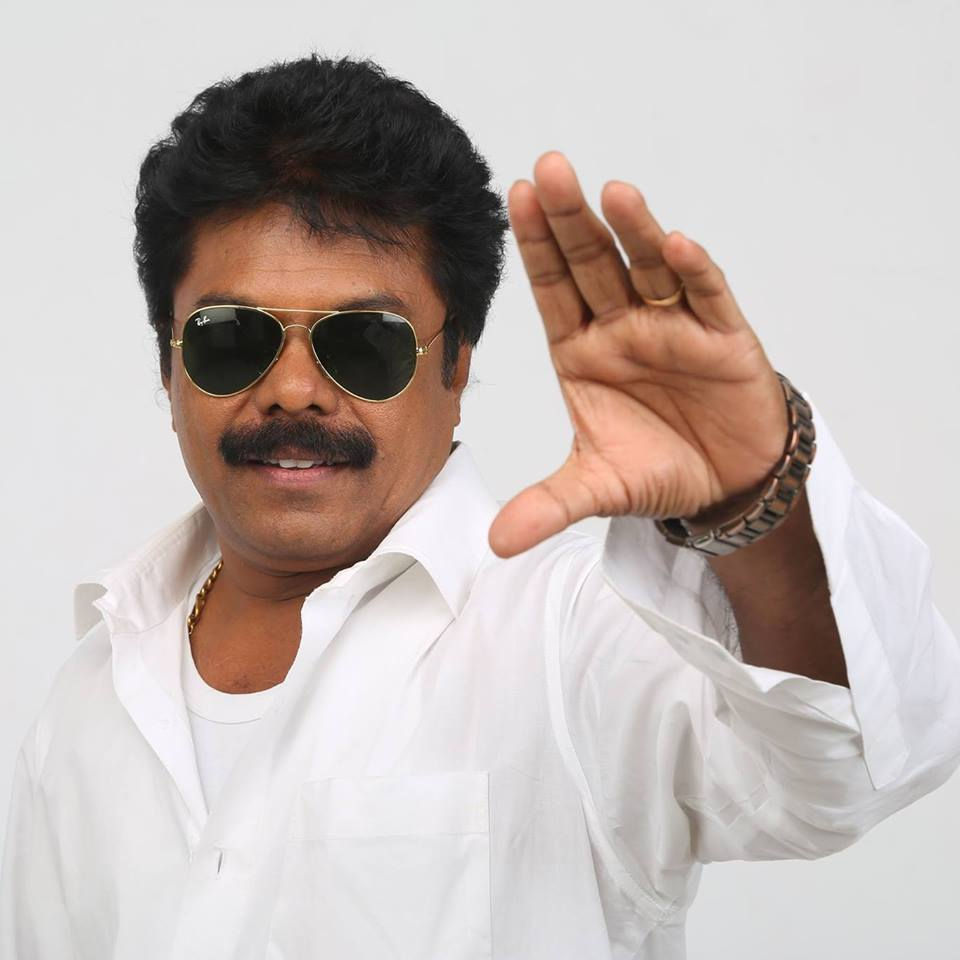
- Jaguar Thangam
- Born: Thanga Pazham; 6 June 1952 (age 73); Tuticorin, Tamilnadu, India
- Occupations: Stunt Choreographer; actor; producer; screenplay writer; Director
- Years active: 1978–present
- Spouse: Shanthi Jaguar Thangam (1984–present)
- Children: Vijaya Siranjeevi, Jai J Jaguar
- Awards: Tamil Nadu State Film Award for Best Stunt Coordinator
- Honours: Kalaimamani 2020

Thanga Pazham (born 6 June 1952 ), known by his screen name Jaguar Thangam, is a stunt choreographer in the Indian film industry who works in almost all regional languages in India primarily in Tamil Cinema. He began Silambam when he was 6 years old. In the middle of 1978, he was given the name Jaguar Thangam by a Malayalam director Mr. Chandrakumar. Following his debut in Chandrakumar's Hindi drama Meena Bazzar (1978) as a stunt coordinator, his stunt career commenced with a brief phase of stunt sequences in nationwide film industry.

Jaguar Thangam was found by Mr. M.G.Ramachandran popularly known as M.G.R. (a famous actor and former Chief Minister of Tamilnadu ) in his early stage. As of now Jaguar Thangam completed 1000+ films in almost all languages in India. Jaguar Thangam has won Four Tamil Nadu State Film Award for Best Stunt Coordinator for Five Tamil movies.

In addition to stunt, he is also working as an actor, producer, Script writer and Director. Apart from his stunt career, he is interested in social activities and politics. Jaguar Thangam is associated as Honourable Secretary with the Film and Television Producers’ Guild of South India, which is located in Thiyagaraya Nagar in Chennai, Tamilnadu.

== Early career ==
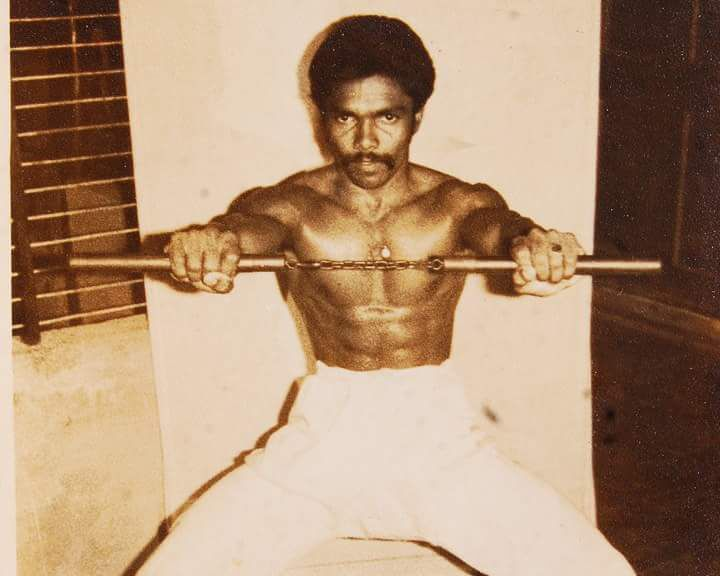
Jaguar Thangam at the age of 40

Jaguar Thangam started learning Silambam at the age of 6. From then till now, he has been the only person in the film industry who has mastered 27 kinds of stunt arts.

== Film career ==
Jaguar Thangam started his film career in Hindi as a Stunt Choreographer in the movie Meena Bazaar in 1978. Following that, he has done more than 87 films in Hindi where he did 17 movies with the veteran actor Mithun Chakraborty.

He started his film career as a stunt fighter in the Tamil movie Vetri in which famous Tamil actor Vijayakanth got a lead role. He started his career as a Stunt Choreographer in Tamil movie Vaigasi Poranthachu. He worked in the Hollywood movie Blood Stone, which is the only Hollywood movie of Rajinikanth. He worked with the veteran actor Kamal Hasan in the movie Maharasan.

Jaguar Thangam completed more than 1000 films in almost all languages in the Indian film industry.

The following stunt choreographers are the students of Jaguar Thangam: Peter Hein, Anal Arasu, K. Ganesh Kumar, Stunt Silva, S. R. Murugan, and Knockout Nandha.

== Personal life ==
Jaguar Thangam married Shanthi, whose native was in Chakkammalpuram, near Pudukkottai, Thoothukudi district, but she was born in Chennai on 24 September 1963 and was named by M. G. Ramachandran known as M.G.R. (a famous actor and former Chief Minister of Tamilnadu ). The marriage took place on 9 September 1984 at Pasumpon Muthuramalinga Dever Kalyana Mandapam in Thiyagaraya Nagar, Chennai. The couple has two sons named Vijaya Siranjeevi and Jai J Jaguar. Both are very active in Tamil cinema as Stunt Choreographer as well as actors. Vijay Chiranjeevi made his acting debut with Suryaa (2008), directed by his father.

== Filmography ==
Films

- 1978 Meena Bazaar (Hindi)
- 1990 Vaigasi Poranthachu
- 1991 Naan Pudicha Mappillai
- 1991 Nenjamundu Nermaiundu
- 1991 Ennarukil Nee Irunthal
- 1991 Vaidehi Vandhachu
- 1991 Pondatti Sonna Kettukanum
- 1992 Thanga Manasukkaran
- 1992 Pondatti Rajyam
- 1992 Thilagam
- 1992 Onna Irukka Kathukanum
- 1993 Manikuyil
- 1993 Maharasan
- 1993 Amma Ponnu
- 1993 Shenbagam
- 1993 Nallathe Nadakkum
- 1993 Captain (Kannada)
- 1993 Band Master
- 1993 Pass Mark
- 1993 Akkarai Cheemaiyile
- 1993 Parvathi Ennai Paradi
- 1993 Purusha Lakshanam
- 1993 Kizhakke Varum Paattu
- 1994 Varavu Ettana Selavu Pathana
- 1994 Madhumathi
- 1994 Veettai Paaru Naattai Paaru
- 1994 Sevatha Ponnu
- 1994 Bombat Raja Bandal Rani (Kannada)
- 1994 Pandianin Rajyathil
- 1994 Thamarai
- 1994 Thaai Manasu
- 1995 Valli Vara Pora
- 1995 Thedi Vandha Raasa
- 1995 Manathile Oru Paattu
- 1995 Witness
- 1995 Chithirai Thiruvizha
- 1995 Thaikulame Thaikulame
- 1995 Murai Mappillai
- 1996 Amman Kovil Vaasalile
- 1996 Kaalam Maari Pochu
- 1996 Andha Naal
- 1996 Take It Easy Urvashi
- 1996 Gopala Gopala
- 1996 Poomani
- 1996 Purushan Pondatti
- 1997 Pongalo Pongal
- 1997 Pagaivan
- 1997 Periya Manushan
- 1997 Thadayam
- 1997 Roja Malare
- 1997 Thambi Durai
- 1997 Pudhalvan
- 1998 Kizhakkum Merkkum
- 1998 Veera Thalattu
- 1998 Aval Varuvala
- 1998 Priyamudan
- 1998 Ellame En Pondattithaan
- 1998 Nilaave Vaa
- 1999 Endrendrum Kadhal
- 1999 Annan
- 1999 Poomagal Oorvalam
- 1999 Chinna Raja
- 1999 Poomaname Vaa
- 1999 Viralukketha Veekkam
- 1999 Manaivikku Mariyadhai
- 1999 Maravathe Kanmaniye
- 2000 Magalirkkaga
- 2000 Koodi Vazhnthal Kodi Nanmai
- 2001 Seerivarum Kaalai
- 2001 Dhosth
- 2001 Viswanathan Ramamoorthy
- 2001 Veettoda Mappillai
- 2001 Kabadi Kabadi
- 2001 Shahjahan
- 2001 Vadagupatti Maapillai
- 2002 Unnai Ninaithu
- 2002 Thenkasi Pattanam
- 2002 Namma Veetu Kalyanam
- 2002 Bagavathi
- 2002 Mutham
- 2003 Annai Kaligambal
- 2003 Student Number 1
- 2003 Anbu Thollai
- 2003 Dum
- 2003 Vani Mahal
- 2003 Thiruda Thirudi
- 2003 Athanda Ithanda
- 2003 Aalukkoru Aasai
- 2004 Adi Thadi
- 2004 Jore
- 2004 Azhagesan
- 2004 Adhu
- 2004 Maha Nadigan
- 2004 Ramakrishna
- 2005 Sukran
- 2005 Kannamma
- 2005 Gurudeva
- 2005 Girivalam
- 2005 Karka Kasadara
- 2005 Kaatrullavarai
- 2005 Vetrivel Sakthivel
- 2006 Chennai Kadhal
- 2007 Thirumagan
- 2007 Dhandayuthapani
- 2007 Vyabari
- 2007 Veeramum Eeramum
- 2007 Manikanda
- 2007 Pazhaniappa Kalloori
- 2008 Ayyavazhi
- 2008 Suryaa
- 2010 Pollachi Mappillai
- 2010 Gowravargal
- 2011 Narthagi
- 2012 Idhayam Thiraiarangam
- 2012 Uyir Ezhuthu
- 2012 Sengathu Bhoomiyile
- 2014 Snehavin Kadhalarkal
- 2014 MGR Sivaji Rajini Kamal

Television

- 2000 Krishnadasi
- 2001 Jhala Khreedai
- 2014 Romapuri Pandian

=== Director ===
- 2008 Suryaa

=== Actor ===
- 1990 Vaigasi Poranthachu
- 1996 Gopala Gopala
- 1997 Thadayam
- 1998 Priyamudan
- 1998 Nilaave Vaa
- 2004 Ramakrishna
- 2005 Vetrivel Sakthivel
- 2006 Chennai Kadhal
- 2015 MGR Sivaji Rajini Kamal
- 2017 Julieum 4 Perum
- 2022 Uzhaikkum Kaigal
- 2022 Peya Kaanom

== Awards ==
- 1996 : Tamil Nadu State Film Award for Best Stunt Coordinator - Poomani
- 1998 : Tamil Nadu State Film Award for Best Stunt Coordinator - Priyamudan
- 1999 : Cinema Express Award for Best Stunt Master - Many movies
- 2002 : Tamil Nadu State Film Award for Best Stunt Coordinator - Bagavathi
- 2019 : Kalaimamani Award from the Government of Tamil Nadu.
