= Anjala (film) =

2016 Indian film by Thangam Saravanan

- Theatrical release poster
- Directed by: Thangam Saravanan
- Written by: Thangam Saravanan
- Produced by: Dhilip Subbarayan
- Starring: Vimal; Nandita; Riythvika; Pasupathy
- Cinematography: Ravikannan
- Edited by: Praveen K. L.
- Music by: Gopi Sunder
- Production companies: Farmer's Master Plan Production; 1st Copy Pictures
- Distributed by: Auraa Cinemas
- Release date: 12 February 2016
- Country: India
- Language: Tamil

Anjala is a 2016 Tamil-language comedy drama film directed by Thangam Saravanan and produced by Dhilip Subbarayan. Vimal and Nandita star, while Gopi Sunder composes the film's music.

== Cast ==
- Vimal as Gavaskar "Gavas"
- Nandita as Uthra
- Riythvika as Anjala
- Pasupathy as Muthirulandi and Appu
- Aadukalam Murugadoss as Kalyana Raman
- Imman Annachi as Jogging Chellapa
- R. V. Udayakumar as Sundaramoorthy
- Ezhil as Boopathy
- Subbu Panchu as UK
- Venkatraman as Gnanaprakasam
- Shahul Master as John
- Vasanth
- Devaraj
- Kadhal Krishnamoorthy

Special appearances in Promotional song by :

- Bobby Simha
- Deva
- Jayam Ravi
- Jiiva
- Karthi
- Raghava Lawrence
- Rajendran
- Robo Shankar
- Samuthirakani
- Sasikumar
- Sivakarthikeyan
- Soori
- Sridhar
- Thambi Ramaiah
- Vijay Sethupathi
- Vikram Prabhu

== Production ==
Produced by stunt choreographer Dhilip Subbarayan, Anjala began production in December 2013 with Vimal, Nanditha, and Pasupathi in the cast. The film's cinematography will be handled by Ravi Kannan, editing by Praveen-Srikanth and music by Gopi Sundar. Dhilip's father Super Subbarayan will handle the action segments of Anjala. The film experienced production delays and was later finalized to release during February 2016.

== Soundtrack ==
Anjala

Soundtrack album by Gopi Sundar
- Released: 19 November 2015
- Genre: Feature film soundtrack
- Language: Tamil
- Label: Sony Music
- Producer: Gopi Sundar

Gopi Sundar chronology
Anjala (2015)	Bangalore Naatkal (2016)

The film's music and soundtrack was composed by Gopi Sundar. The soundtrack features five songs, the lyrics for which are written by Na Muthukumar, Yugabharati, Gangai Amaran, Yegathasi and Lalithanand. Behindwoods rated the album 2.75 out of 5 and called it "Anjala is a decent fun album that stays honest to its folksy aroma!".

Track listing
No.	Title	Lyrics	Singer(s)	Length
1.	"Nakkalu Maama"	Na. Muthukumar	Nanda, Santosh Hariharan, Pooja AV, Sai, Azhagesan, Tamil & Muthu Chamy	5:12
2.	"Kanjadai"	Yugabharathi	V. V. Prasanna, Vandana Srinivasan	4:54
3.	"Yaarai Ketpadhu"	Na. Muthukumar	Gangai Amaren	4:50
4.	"Ayyankuli"	Yegadesi	Mukesh Mohamed, Tamil, Thala Muthu, Raaja, Karuppan & Pichai Arasan	4.47
5.	"Tea Podu"	Lalithanand	Deva	4:26

== Critical reception ==
Times of India rated the film 3 out of 5 and wrote "Anjala is an uneven film, with filmmaking that is hardly remarkable and a script that lacks finesse and focus. Yet, the film makes it clear right in the initial scenes that it is more interested in going after our emotions." The Hindu wrote "The foundation on which Anjala is built, is wonderful. But alas. If only the ambition of the makers was to create something more substantial." Behindwoods wrote, "In a nutshell, Anjala might remind you of a similar spot that might have existed in your town too, but it does not drive you to go back there although that may have been the intention of the director." Hindustan Times wrote "As much as the theme of Anjala may be unique, the film's scripting and treatment leave a lot to be desired." Moviecrow wrote "Anjala is an honest attempt with excellent intent. But intent alone never suffices". Silverscreen wrote "A fascinating plot, marred with unnecessary elements like an insipid romance, some crass comedy, and the juvenile treatment of the screenplay leaves us with one overriding thought."
