= Naan Mahaan Alla (2010 film) =

2010 Indian Tamil-language action film

- Theatrical release poster
- Directed by: Suseenthiran
- Written by: Suseenthiran; Bhaskar Sakthi
- Produced by: K. E. Gnanavel Raja; S. R. Prakash Babu; S. R. Prabhu
- Starring: Karthi; Kajal Aggarwal
- Cinematography: R. Madhi
- Edited by: Kasi Viswanathan
- Music by: Yuvan Shankar Raja
- Production company: Studio Green
- Distributed by: Cloud Nine Movies
- Release date: 20 August 2010
- Running time: 131 minutes
- Country: India
- Language: Tamil

Naan Mahaan Alla (transl. I Am Not A Saint) is a 2010 Indian Tamil-language action thriller film directed by Suseenthiran and produced by Studio Green. It stars Karthi and Kajal Aggarwal, while Jayaprakash and Soori play supporting roles. The music was composed by Yuvan Shankar Raja, with cinematography handled by R. Madhi and editing by Kasi Viswanathan. The film is about an unemployed, carefree young man whose father becomes the target of a gang of young criminals after witnessing a kidnapping.

Naan Mahaan Alla is not related to the 1984 film of the same name and is based on a real-life incident. It was released on 20 August 2010.

== Plot ==
Jeeva is a Chennai-based youngster from a middle-class family. His father, Pragasam, is a call taxi driver and the family's sole breadwinner. Jeeva meets a woman named Priya at their friend's wedding, and they soon fall for each other. Upon meeting Priya's father, Jeeva is asked to get a job before getting married. Jeeva accepts and takes up a job as a collection agent, but soon gets fired. Pragasam, who had witnessed the killing of two youngsters by a group of five young men, gets attacked by them and is admitted to the hospital. The gang tries to kill him again in the absence of Jeeva, but to no avail.

Pragasam is brought home, and Jeeva starts taking responsibility for his family by reclaiming his lost job and maintaining all the accounts. Looking at the news reports of the girl who boarded his taxi and was raped and then mutilated by the gang, Pragasam calls Jeeva to accompany him to the morgue, where he helps the investigating officer by providing clues about the killer. Sensing trouble, the gang enlists the help of Pey Babu, one of the members' uncles, to plan and kill Pragasam after explaining how they killed the girl and her lover. When Pragasam and Jeeva go out to shop for the latter's sister's wedding, one of the men calls Jeeva on behalf of a store, thus separating him from Pragasam. The gang then creates a stampede by throwing bottles as one of them stabs Pragasam with a piece of poisoned glass shard. Pragasam soon dies in Jeeva's arms, leaving Jeeva devastated.

Following his cremation, Jeeva tells the cops not to pursue the killers anymore, as it would bring nothing but trouble for his middle-class family. However, Jeeva decides to take the law into his hands, fearing the gang might commit more inhumane crimes if they are scot-free. Jeeva recalls one of the men during his father's death, who looked the same as Pragasam described him during his visit to the morgue. Jeeva enlists the help of his friend and a gangster named Kutti Nadesan to track down the gang. With his influence, Kutti Nadesan asks his gang to bring all the guys who planned a murder in Chennai so that Jeeva can identify him. While Jeeva is busy identifying the killers, Pey Babu leaves after being questioned by Nadesan.

Jeeva realizes that Pey Babu was the man who delivered pamphlets at his home before Pragasam's murder. A chase ensues, and Jeeva captures Pey Babu after a brief fight. He orders him to call the boys and tell them to stay in front of their college. Jeeva succeeds in capturing his father's killer and tries to escape, but the gang gets alerted and ends up freeing their friend from Jeeva's custody following a glass bottle attack. One of the gang members stabs Pey Babu to death. Jeeva chases the attacker near a railway line where the two brutally fight, resulting in the attacker getting run over by a train.

Jeeva visits the deceased gang member's funeral to catch his friends, who escape before Jeeva sees them. They go to the beach, where Nadesan and his henchmen also are. The gang gets drunk and vows to kill Jeeva, who contacts Nadesan to find out about the four remaining boys. Noticing the boys yelling, Nadesan asks for specifics and confirms the gang's location at the beach. While trying to confront the gang, Nadesan and his henchmen are lured into a trap, where they are all eliminated one by one before Jeeva arrives. A brutal fight ensues, leaving the gang members fatally wounded. Jeeva throws them into a pit and departs after burying all of them.

== Cast ==
- Karthi as Jeeva Pragasam
- Kajal Aggarwal as Priya Sudharsan, Jeeva's love interest
- Jayaprakash as Pragasam, Jeeva's father
- Soori as Ravi, Jeeva's best friend
- Ravi Prakash as Sudharsan, Priya's father
- Hari Vairavan as Valavan
- Rajeevan as Singaaram
- Ramachandran Durairaj as Pei Babu
- Vijay Sethupathi as Ganesh, Jeeva's friend
- Lakshmi Ramakrishnan as Jeeva's mother
- Priya Atlee as Keerthi Pragasam, Jeeva's sister
- Neelima Rani as Sudha
- Misha Ghoshal as Priya's friend
- Aruldoss as Kutti Nadesan
- Thanjai Mahendran as Dhanam
- Mahendran Kandhaiyan as one of the antagonists
- Vinod Kishan
- Arun
- Anburaj
- Emmanuel
- Satthya
- Sindhu as Saroja, Kutti Nadesan's wife
- Gayathri Tutlu
- Shathiga Banu as the murdered girl

== Production ==
After his first feature film Vennila Kabadi Kuzhu, released in February 2009, became a success and received critical acclaim, director Suseenthiran started working on the script for his next film. Initially planning to do one titled Azhagarsamiyin Kuthirai, which failed to commence due to financial problems, he decided to first direct a film featuring a known lead actor before returning to that film. He was ready with the script by August 2009, revealing details about the project. While his previous work was based on sporting incidents in a rural background, this one was said to be a "total city subject" set entirely in Chennai, and would deal about problems in city life. On 19 August 2009, it was announced that the film was titled Naan Mahaan Alla and would be produced by K. E. Gnanavel Raja under the banner of Studio Green. It was based on a real-life incident that happened to one of the relatives of Suseenthiran. He scripted the film for five months.

Vishnu Vishal, who acted in Vennila Kabadi Kuzhu, was the initial choice for the lead role. While Vennila Kabadi Kuzhu starred mostly newcomers, Suseenthiran chose Karthi for the lead role in this film as he felt the latter has an "innocence in his face" that was needed for this role and that he could "convey charm, innocence and being jolly at the same time". He chose Kajal Aggarwal as the lead actress after seeing her performances in the Telugu films Chandamama and Magadheera. He felt that her "cute expressions" were what he needed for that character. Soori, who played a comedic role in Vennila Kabadi Kuzhu was again included, while Jayaprakash, who played several supporting roles and rose to fame with his performance in Pasanga, was chosen to play Karthi's father. As in his previous film, Suseenthiran introduced several new artists, such as five boys who played the villains. One of them, Vinoth Kishan, played the younger character of Suriya in Nandhaa. According to the director, he found three of them "loitering on a popular road in the city", whilst cinematographer Vijay Milton's assistant Ramachandran Durairaj and cinematographer Aruldoss debuted and played pivotal roles.

Filming began, after 10 days of rehearsals, on 4 September 2009 and was held in cities as Chennai, Hyderabad and Visakhapatnam. As of mid-September, filming was happening at East Coast Road, Chennai.

== Soundtrack ==
The soundtrack of Naan Mahaan Alla is composed by Yuvan Shankar Raja in third collaboration with Karthi, after Paruthiveeran (2007) and Paiyaa (2010), and his first with Suseenthiran. The soundtrack album, which features five songs, with lyrics penned by Na. Muthukumar and Yugabharathi was released on 24 July 2010 at Sathyam Cinemas in Chennai.

== Release ==
Naan Mahaan Alla was released on 20 August 2010. It was distributed by Cloud Nine Movies in Tamil Nadu.

=== Reception ===
Pavithra Srinivasan of Rediff.com gave 3/5 stars and described the film as "almost perfect." Sify wrote, "Naan Mahaan Alla reinvents the staple formula but stands out for its sheer style, speed and storytelling methods." Bhama Devi Rani of The Times of India gave 3.5/5 stars, claiming the film to be "entertaining almost till the end", whilst addressing high praise to both Suseenthiran, who according to her is "turning out to be a treasure" and considering Karthi's performance as his "best work yet".

=== Accolades ===
| Award | Category | Name | Outcome | Ref. |
|---|---|---|---|---|
| Edison Awards | Best Character Actor | Jayaprakash | Won | |
| Edison Awards | Best Villain | Mahi, Anbu, Iman, Vinoth and Arun | Won | |
| Edison Awards | Best PRO (Public Relations Officer) | John | Won | |
| Edison Awards | Best Supporting Actress | Neelima Rani | Won | |
| 58th Filmfare Awards South | Best Music Director – Tamil | Yuvan Shankar Raja | Nominated | |
| 58th Filmfare Awards South | Best Male Playback Singer – Tamil | Yuvan Shankar Raja for "Iragai Pole" | Nominated | |
| 5th Vijay Awards | Best Actor | Karthi | Nominated | |
| 5th Vijay Awards | Best Villain | Vinoth Kishan | Nominated | |
| 5th Vijay Awards | Best Art Director | Rajeevan | Nominated | |
| 5th Vijay Awards | Best Stunt Director | Anal Arasu | Won | |
| 5th Vijay Awards | Best Editor | Kasi Viswanathan | Won | |
