= Annaatthe =

2021 film directed by Siva

- Theatrical release poster
- Directed by: Siva
- Written by: Siva; Aadhi Narayana
- Produced by: Kalanithi Maran
- Starring: Rajinikanth; Khushbu; Meena; Nayanthara; Keerthy Suresh; Jagapathi Babu
- Cinematography: Vetri
- Edited by: Ruben
- Music by: D. Imman
- Production company: Sun Pictures
- Distributed by: PVR Pictures; Red Giant Movies
- Release date: 4 November 2021 (India)
- Running time: 161 minutes
- Country: India
- Language: Tamil
- Budget: est.₹180 crore
- Box office: est. ₹240 crore

Annaatthe (transl. Big Brother) is a 2021 Indian Tamil-language action thriller film directed by Siva and produced by Kalanithi Maran under Sun Pictures. The film stars Rajinikanth in the titular role, alongside Khushbu, Meena, Nayanthara, Keerthy Suresh, Jagapathi Babu, Soori, Prakash Raj, and Abhimanyu Singh. D. Imman composed the film's music, Vetri handled the cinematography, Dhilip Subbarayan arranged stunts and Ruben edited the film. The movie's plot revolves around Kaalaiyan alias Annaatthe, a sarpanch (decision maker) in Thanjavur, who strives to protect his sister from an evil corporate and his crime boss elder brother in Kolkata.

The film was officially announced in October 2019, marking Rajinikanth's first collaboration with Siva. Principal photography began on 11 December 2019 and was completed in September 2021. The COVID-19 lockdown in India and Rajinikanth's health issues in late-December 2020 delayed the film's production. Filming was primarily done in Ramoji Film City, Hyderabad, and a few sequences were shot in Chennai.

Annaatthe was released on 4 November 2021, coinciding with the Deepavali festival. Upon release the film was critically panned. During its theatrical run, Annaatthe grossed an estimated revenue of ₹240 crores worldwide against a budget of ₹180 crores, making it a commercial success. The Embassy of India announced the release of the film in Argentina to promote culture and tourism.

== Plot ==
Kaalaiyan is a sarpanch (decision maker) in the village of Soorakkottai, Thanjavur District, who respects the principles of fairness. His ideals lead him to clash with a rival village leader Nattadurai, who controls people by scaring them. When Nattadurai tries to extort land from an old man, he hires lawyer Pattammal to defend his case. Kaalaiyan exposes the truth, and Pattammal betrays her client and withdraws the case. Pattammal and Kaalaiyan fall in love. Kaalaiyan's world revolves around his sister Thanga Meenatchi, whom he raised after the deaths of their parents. Meenatchi returns home, having completed her education. Kaalaiyan has difficulty finding a husband for his sister because everyone is afraid of him. Kaalaiyan's annoying cousins, sisters Angayarkanni and Mangaiyarkarasi, both of whom wanted to marry Kaalaiyan but he had not agreed, propose their brothers marry Thanga Meenatchi. Without her consent, Thanga Meenatchi's marriage is arranged with Nattadurai's younger brother. Meenatchi goes missing on the day of the wedding; Kaalaiyan dispatches a search party who finds Meenatchi trying to elope on a train with her boyfriend from college.

Torn by his love for his sister, Kaalaiyan allows Meenatchi to leave and deflects demands from relatives for an honour killing. Meenatchi and her husband move to Kolkata, and she loses contact with Kaalaiyan. Kaalaiyan and Pattammal travel to Kolkata. Kaalaiyan discovers his sister has serious financial troubles; he secretly follows her and discovers that she has borrowed money from a gangster. When the gangster tries to assault Meenatchi, Kaalaiyan secretly assaults him and moves Meenatchi to Pattammal's apartment, where he can safely watch her. Thugs threaten Meenatchi, and she falls ill. When Pattammal leaves the house to get her medicine, the thugs attack her. Kaalaiyan rescues Meenatchi and interrogates her attackers.

When Meenatchi and her husband started a business in Kolkata, a wealthy businessman and underworld don Manoj Parekar approached them. Manoj wanted to purchase half of their shares, but Meenatchi's husband refused. Over the following weeks, Meenatchi's factory caught fire, they were forced to close it, and her husband was arrested on invented charges and tortured in police custody. Meenatchi had begged Manoj to get her husband released and signed over her company. Manoj had refused to get him released and had everyone who agreed to help her murdered.

In the present, Meenatchi is still trying to get her husband released with Pattammal's help and realises that she is pregnant. Kaalaiyan is very happy to hear this; he and Pattammal organise a baby shower for her. After learning about Meenatchi's misfortune, Kaalaiyan wants to kill the gangsters using his sister as bait and swears to destroy Manoj Parekar. Using the pseudonym Annaatthe, Kaalaiyan and his village friends storm Manoj's office and issue an ultimatum. After more drama, Annaatthe corners Manoj and forces him to sign papers saying he will return the companies he stole to their former owners. Kaalaiyan decides to spare Manoj's life. Enraged and humiliated, Manoj visits his estranged brother Udhav Parekar, where he demands the death of Annaatthe and then kills himself. Udhav finds Meenatchi and takes men to attack her. Pattammal, instructed by Kaalaiyan, hides Meenatchi. Udhav's men chase Pattammal and Meenatchi, who become separated by a crashing auto-rickshaw. Kaalaiyan arrives, assaults all of Udhav's men, and kills Udhav. Kaalaiyan reveals himself to Meenatchi, who tearfully apologizes for the trouble she put him through.

== Cast ==
- Rajinikanth as Kaalaiyan / Annaatthe
  - Bhavaz as Young Kaalaiyan
- Khushbu as Angaiyarkanni
- Meena as Mangayarkarasi "Mangai"
- Nayanthara as Advocate Pattamal
- Keerthy Suresh as Thanga Meenatchi "Thangam", Kaalaiyan's sister
- Jagapathi Babu as Udhav Parekar
- Soori as Pachakili, Kaalaiyan's sidekick
- Abhimanyu Singh as Manoj Parekar, Udhav Parekar's brother
- Prakash Raj as Nattadurai
- Bala as Arjun, Manoj's sidekick
- Livingston as Irulandi, Mangayarkarasi's husband
- Pandiarajan as Idithangi, Angayarkanni's husband
- Sathish as Sathyaseelan, Angayarkanni's brother
- Sathyan as Azhagudurai, Mangayarkarasi's brother
- Vela Ramamoorthy as Kaalaiyan's uncle
- Billy Murali as Manoj's henchman
- Rohiet Nair as Banerjee
- Mukthar Khan as Udhav's right-hand man
- Ayyappa P. Sharma as Manoj's henchman
- Kulappulli Leela as Kaalaiyan's grandmother
- Anjali Nair as Kaalaiyan and Meenakshi's mother
- Banerjee as Kaalaiyan's uncle
- Piraisoodan as Kaalaiyan's uncle
- Naadodigal Gopal as Kaalaiyan's uncle
- Thavasi as a priest
- Redin Kingsley as Puli Pandi, Nattadurai's assistant
- Arjai as Kaalaiyan's sidekick
- Vishwanth as Kaalaiyan's sidekick
- Ravi Awana as Manoj's sidekick
- Arvind Krishna as Meenatchi's husband
- Aniket Chouhan
- Rajitha as Kaalaiyan's aunt
- Hrishikesh as a potential groom
- Sreeja Ravi as a doctor; Uncredited
- George Maryan as Komberi Mookan, Kaalaiyan's sidekick
- Sriranjani as Nattadurai's wife
- C. Ranganathan as potential groom's father

== Production ==
=== Development ===
In mid-October 2019, media reports stated that Rajinikanth would be working with director Siva after the release of Darbar (2020). On 11 October, Kalanithi Maran, whose production house Sun Pictures was bankrolling the venture, confirmed the project, which had the working title Thalaivar 168. The project was Rajinikanth's 168th film. It was also Rajinikanth's third collaboration with Sun Pictures after Endhiran and Petta. Composer D. Imman, who had worked with the director on Viswasam (2019), was reported to be scoring for the film. His inclusion was confirmed by the producer in mid-November. It was reported that the film will be titled as Viyugam and Mannavan, however the team denied the rumours. The film's title Annaatthe was revealed on 24 February 2020.

Keerthy Suresh, speaking in 2021, said: "I shot for a few days with Rajini sir before lockdown and I was starstruck throughout the shoot. I am sure it is going to be the same until I complete the film. Annaatthe is going to be special."

=== Pre-production ===
Siva's usual technical crew consisting of Vetri, Ruben, and Milan, as well as first-time collaborator Dhilip Subbarayan, were reported to be the film's cinematographer, editor, art director and stunt choreographer, respectively. Rajinikanth had penned some punch lines in his film. Initially, the actor was reported to be paid ₹118 crore as his salary for the film but Kalanithi Maran asked to decrease the salary following the failure of Darbar and was prepared to shelve the project if Rajinikanth had refused to do so. After much deliberation, Rajinikanth agreed to decrease his salary.

=== Casting ===
On 23 October 2019, Keerthy Suresh was signed in to act in a pivotal role. Later, comedian Soori was reported to be playing another prominent role. Sun Pictures confirmed the casting of Soori and Keerthy Suresh in December 2019. Keerthy Suresh was reported to have been cast as Rajinikanth's stepsister in the film. In December 2019, the producers also confirmed Meena and Khushbu would be the female leads in Thalaivar 168. Prakash Raj and Sathish joined the film's cast before the start of filming; and Kabali Vishwanth, who worked with Rajinikanth in Kabali (2016), also joined the cast.

On 31 January 2020, Sun Pictures announced Nayanthara had been cast as a lawyer in the film. Vela Ramamoorthy also joined the cast in a crucial role. Telugu actor Gopichand was reported to have been cast as the film's antagonist, but the actor refuted such claims. Jackie Shroff was hired for the role but was replaced by Jagapathi Babu in March 2021. Abhimanyu Singh was cast in a pivotal role in August 2021. Thavasi, who earlier appeared in Varuthapadatha Valibar Sangam (2013) and Rajinimurugan (2015), died in November 2020, making this his final film.

=== Filming ===
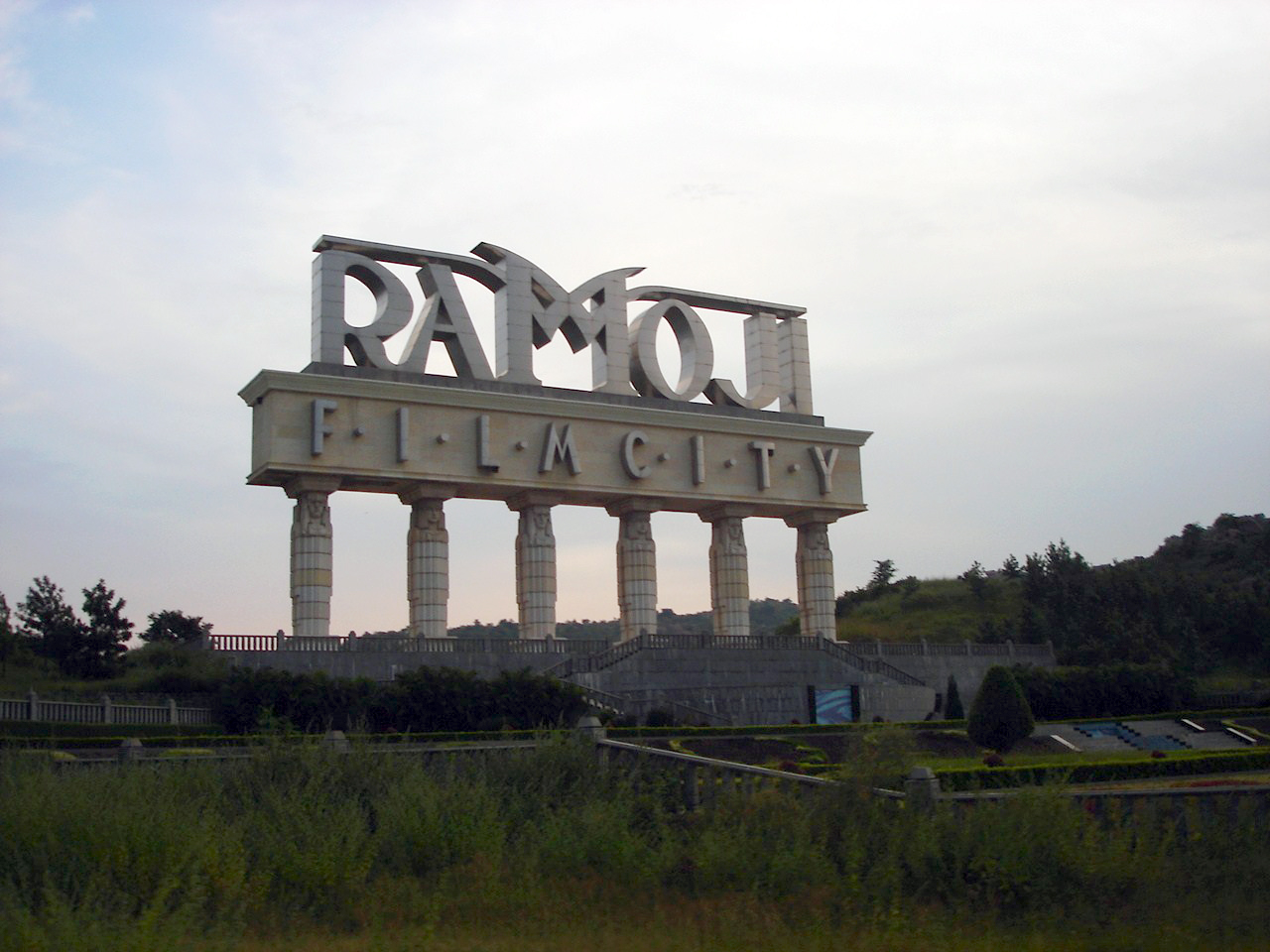
Ramoji Film City, where filming began on 18 December 2019.

Principal photography commenced on 11 December 2019. The film's cast and crew were present at the pooja ceremony held at the office of Sun TV Network in Chennai. Filming began on 18 December 2019 at Ramoji Film City in Hyderabad with a song shoot, while Khushbu filmed her scenes a few days after filming began. Rajinikanth went to film for an episode of Man vs. Wild at Bandipur National Park in Karnataka, which delayed filming. After the announcement of Nayanthara's casting, she joined the sets in February 2020. The producers planned to film some sequences in Kolkata and Pune after the completion of two schedules in Hyderabad but abandoned the idea due to the COVID-19 pandemic and decided to continue filming in Hyderabad. Filming was further delayed due to the pandemic.

It was reported the team would film some sequences in Chennai after lockdown because they would find difficulty travelling to Hyderabad for the shoot. After the government gave permission to resume film and television production following the pandemic, Rajinikanth was reported to have joined the sets in October 2020. The producers postponed filming until November, citing the team's safety. In mid-November 2020, the producers stated filming would resume on 15 December with Rajinikanth joining the schedule, and was expected to be completed within a single session to quickly complete filming. Rajinikanth travelled to Hyderabad on 14 December and started filming before the scheduled date, and Nayanthara was present on the film's sets. Sources said Rajinikanth worked for more than 14 hours to complete the film before his entry into politics. Filming was halted on 23 December 2020 after eight crew members were diagnosed with COVID-19 although Rajinikanth tested negative and underwent self-quarantine in Hyderabad. Rajinikanth was hospitalised on 25 December due to fluctuating blood pressure and was discharged on 27 December.

Following Rajinikanth's health issues, the filmmakers planned to resume filming in Chennai on 15 March 2021 with a single schedule within 30 days. In April, after the Tamil Nadu state legislative assembly election, Rajinikanth went to Hyderabad for the next scheduled shoot. Filming happened quickly despite a night-time curfew and other restrictions. The team filmed a few stunt sequences with Rajinikanth; the team sought permission from the government and Hyderabad police to film the night scenes. The team ensured safety at the sets while filming at a brisk pace. Nayanthara joined the film's team in late April 2021, and scenes featuring Rajinikanth and Nayanthara were filmed within three days.

=== Post-production ===
On 10 May 2021, it was announced Rajinikanth had completed his portions of the film, except for a few patchwork sequences. The final filming schedule took place at a private studio in Chennai in July 2021. In August, except for minor portions, the stunt sequences of the film had been completed, and Rajinikanth and Khushbu began dubbing their portions. The final copy of the film was ready by September 2021 and the film was sent to Central Board of Film Certification (CBFC) for public viewing; the Board gave the film a U/A certificate. The film's final runtime is 163 minutes; the first half runs for 83 minutes and the second half is about 80 minutes.

== Music ==
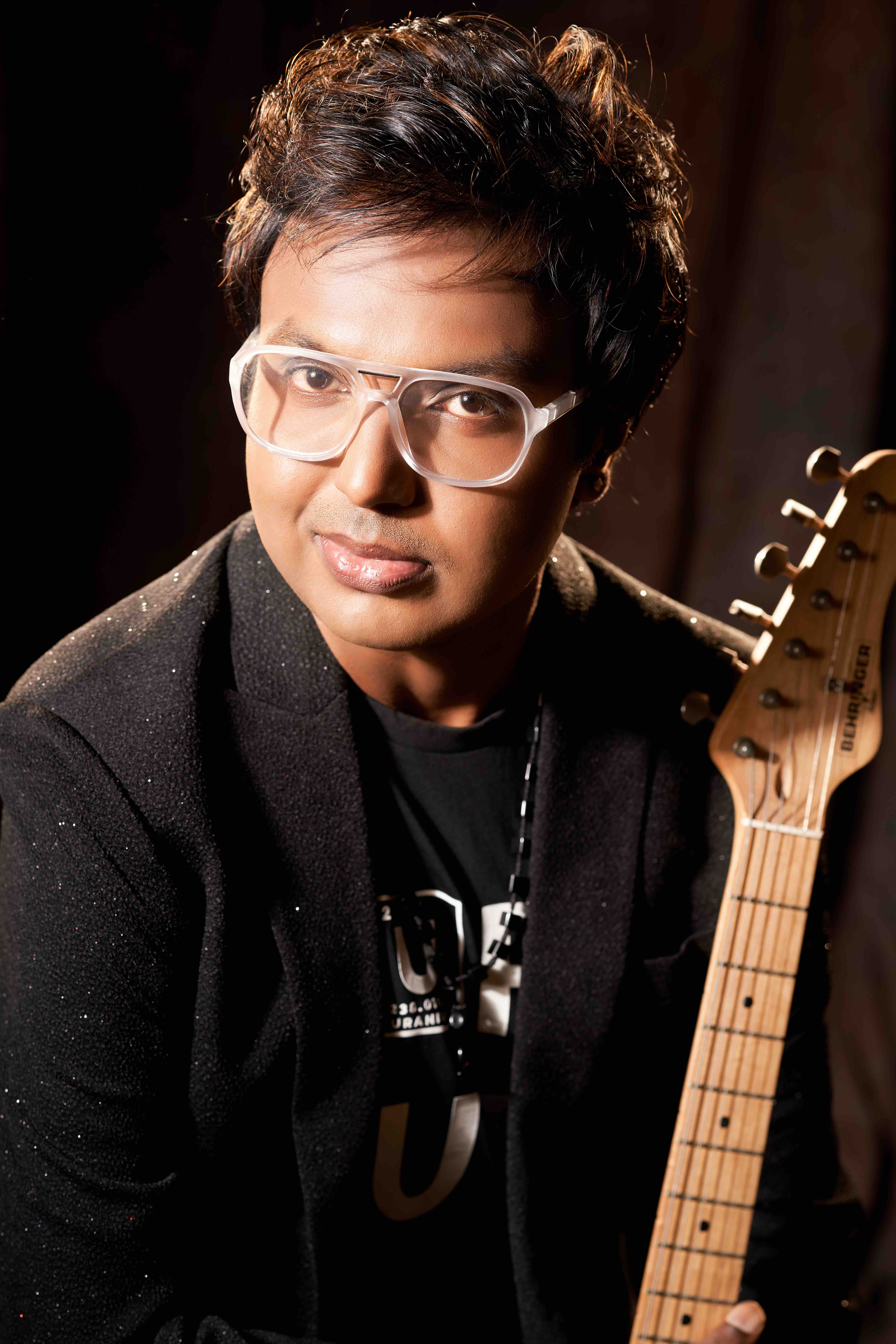
D. Imman composed the film's soundtrack and score in his first collaboration with Rajinikanth.

D. Imman composed the soundtrack to Annaatthe, collaborating with actor Rajinikanth for the first time and director Siva for the second time after Viswasam (2019). Thamarai, Viveka, Yugabharathi, Arun Bharathi, Mani Amuthavan, and Arivu wrote the lyrics. In an interview with Sudhir Srinivasan of The New Indian Express, Imman said: "Fans expect certain factors from Rajinikanth's songs. On the other hand, I want the album to carry my identity as well. I have to cater to both. In addition to that, Rajini sir is acting in a full-fledged rural entertainer after a while. So, the album should justify all these aspects." Songs were composed between January and March 2020, and after being interrupted due to COVID-19 lockdown in that month, composing resumed in November and the film score was completed by February 2021.

The soundtrack album would reportedly have five songs and a theme, and lyrics would be written by Thamarai, Viveka, Yugabharathi, Arun Bharathi, Mani Amuthavan and Arivu. Imman said the songs would be of varied genres; a mass track that is the film's opening song, melody, dance and festive numbers. Sun Pictures had planned to withhold the audio, satellite and digital rights of the film, and had planned to release the entire soundtrack itself. Veteran singer S. P. Balasubrahmanyam recorded an introduction song, which was later titled "Annaatthe Annaatthe", for Rajinikanth in the film, which marked his last song before his death on 25 September 2020.

Other singers on album are K. S. Chithra, Sid Sriram, Shreya Ghoshal, Anirudh Ravichander, Diwakar, and the composer Imman. Deciding not to tie-up with music labels, Sun Pictures released the album through its production house; lyric videos were released on the official YouTube channel of Sun TV. The lyrics of all the songs are in Tamil rather than English. The opening track "Annaatthe Annaatthe" was the first to be released.

Considering it as a heartfelt tribute to the deceased singer S. P. Balasubrahmanyam, Rajinikanth wrote an emotional note about the singer, saying he will "live forever through his voice". Another two singles, "Saara Kaatrae" and "Marudhaani", were released on 6 and 11 October 2021, respectively. The song "Vaa Saamy" was released on 25 October 2021, along with the audio jukebox on YouTube. The songs were later released through music streaming platforms. a week later, on 1 November 2021, without any promotional event due to the ongoing COVID-19 pandemic restrictions. The soundtrack, including the earlier released singles, received a positive response from audiences and topped the charts online.

== Release ==
=== Theatrical ===
Annaatthe was released on 4 November 2021, coinciding with Diwali. Initially the film was scheduled for release on 25 October 2020, coinciding with the eve of Dusshera. In May 2020, Sun Pictures announced the movie was to be scheduled for release on 14 January 2021 during Pongal. The film's release was again postponed due to the delay in filming caused by the COVID-19 pandemic. In January 2021, the producers announced the film would be released

==== Pre-sale records ====
Sales of Annaatthe cinema tickets exceeded 1.3 million on BookMyShow, becoming the first film to sell a million tickets on the platform after the COVID-19 pandemic.

==== Pre-release reception ====
Prior to the theatrical release, Rajinikanth watched the special screening of the film with his daughter Soundarya Rajinikanth, and grandsons Yathra and Linga. Soundarya, in her newly launched social-media platform Huut, shared her review about the film, saying:

The people haven't still watched what you've done in Annaatthe Siva sir, but I've witnessed it. I came out and shook hands with you in tears after watching the movie. I told you that what you've done is not magic but an undescribable feeling. As an ardent fan of Thalaivar and as a daughter to my father, I am moved by the way you looked after him.

==== Screening and statistics ====
Annaatthe was released in over 2,100 theatres worldwide, including 900 in India, due to Enemy's huge demand. It was also shown in 1,193 screens outside India, the widest release for a Tamil film after the COVID-19 lockdown. Naman Ramachandran of Variety magazine reported the film would be released in 677 screens in the United States, 17 screens in Canada, 110 screens in Malaysia, 23 screens in Singapore, 35 screens in the United Kingdom, 43 screens across Europe, 85 screens in Australia and New Zealand, 117 screens in the United Arab Emirates and 86 screens in Sri Lanka. In India, theatre owners in Tamil Nadu allotted 600 screens to the film's release. On 30 October 2021, advanced bookings for the film began at a limited number of screens in Tamil Nadu; sales were good despite the lack of promotional activities. The increase in seating capacity to 100% piqued the interest of the audience, according to trade analysts. The first show of the film was scheduled at 4:00 AM on the day of the release.

=== Distribution ===
In mid-October 2021, the co-founders of Asian Cinemas Narayandas K Narang and D. Suresh Babu announced they had acquired the theatrical rights to Annaatthe in Andhra Pradesh and Telangana valued at ₹12 crore (US$1.3 million), for the film. Udhayanidhi Stalin's firm Red Giant Movies purchased the distribution rights of the film in Tamil Nadu. UFO Moviez acquired the theatrical rights for the film's Tamil version in North India. Qube Cinema acquired the theatrical rights in the US and Canada. Ahead of the Indian theatrical release on 4 November 2021, Qube planned to release Annaatthe on 3 November in over 700 screens across 56 locations, the most for a Tamil film. 4Seasons Creations bought the film's distribution rights in Europe.

=== Home media ===
Sun Network bought the non-theatrical rights for television and streaming of Annaatthe on Sun TV (Tamil version) and Sun NXT, tying with Netflix for a wide digital release in all South-Indian languages. The film premiered on 25 November 2021 just 22 days after the theatrical release on Sun NXT and Netflix. The film premiered on Sun TV on the Pongal festival, and became the third-highest TRP-rated Tamil film of all time.

== Reception ==
=== Box office ===
Annaatthe grossed ₹70.19 crore (US$7.5 million) worldwide on the first day of release, including ₹34.92 crore (US$3.7 million) in Tamil Nadu, exceeding Sarkar with (₹32 crore (US$3.4 million)). On the second day, Annaatthe grossed 42.63 crore with the two-day gross standing at 112.82 crore.

During its theatrical run, Annaatthe grossed an estimated revenue between ₹227-239 crores worldwide and became the highest-grossing Tamil film of 2021.

Annaatthe, which hit the screens on Diwali 2021, enjoyed a strong run at the box office. The film surpassed the ₹150-crore mark in Tamil Nadu after Bahubali 2 and 2.0 and ran in theatres across the country. Its worldwide box office collection reached ₹239.21 crore, establishing it as a major commercial success.

=== Critical response ===
Annaatthe received negative reviews from critics. According to Perarasu: "A film manages to entertain as well as inform. But a film is compared to the crime range and criticized by some with cruelty, abuse, civility, and so on, It's painful! Some YouTube channel reviews have gone down so much, but despite those negative reviews, the success of Annaatthe will make your heads up" M. Suganth of The Times of India gave the film two stars out of five and wrote:

If Petta felt like a pastiche of Rajinikanth's films, Annaatthe seems like a collage made out of the weaker moments from director Siva's filmography. We have the villains from Siruthai, the 'saviour who cannot reveal his identity' angle from Veeram, the brother-sister sentiment from Vedalam, and the rural backdrop from Viswasam. The result is a movie whose emotional beats feel blatantly calculated and manipulative. D. Imman's use of a sentimental score hardly adds an emotional punch to the action scenes, which are shot in a generic manner.

Sify gave two-and-a-half stars out of five and wrote: "The bottom line about Annaatthe is that, although the old Rajini formula is back, the entertainment we had witnessed in those days is missing in this 2021 film".

Haricharan Pudipeddi of Hindustan Times wrote: "Annaatthe is unarguably the weakest film in Siva's filmography. For all those who complained Darbar was Rajinikanth's lamest film in recent years, they'll change their opinion as they step out of Annaatthe."

Janani. K India Today gave two stars out of five and wrote: "Overall, Annaatthe did have the potential to be a moving family drama. However, it is the screenplay that tests everyone's patience." Aditya Srikrishna of The Quint wrote: "Annaatthe has Rajinikanth in probably his worst film since Baba and in a performance that displays the weariness of a hitchhiker air dropped in the middle of a desert and left with an empty water bottle". Indo-Asian News Service (IANS) gave two-and-a-half stars out of five and wrote: "despite some original dialogues and Imman's foot-tapping music, on the whole, Annaatthe ends up being a sentimental drama that has very little to offer in terms of entertainment". Saibal Chatterjee of NDTV gave Annaatthe two stars out of five and wrote:

The moniker is absolutely apt and not for him alone. What does the superstar do in this lumbering movie to help its stale cocktail of sentimentality, swag and silliness gather momentum? He parrots lines that we have heard before. That, in short, is Annaatthe: a moth-eaten mess whose mustiness even Rajinikanth at full tilt cannot mitigate.

Ashameera Aiyappan of Firstpost gave two stars out of five and wrote:

in a Rajinikanth film, the craft is secondary. One goes to the theatres purely for the man's electrifying screen presence. In Annaatthe, the Thalaivar looks good. He does what he usually does. The energy, the charisma—it is all there. But what used to look effortless, now seems arduous. Even though he tries hard to not let it show, you can sense the tiredness. His past few releases have been attempts to recreate the vintage Rajini, but the Superstar has so much more to offer. Will we get to see that though? I am not sure."

Sudhir Srinivasan of The New Indian Express stated:

As we seem to slowly near the end of his filmography (there are constantly rumours about what might be his last film), there's the temptation to lap up whatever we get. That's perhaps why Siva went all the way back to the 90s in search of a winning recipe. And that's also perhaps why Annaatthe might have been better served with a final scene that establishes happiness and joy among the characters, as opposed to its rather downing end. After all, when Rajinikanth laughs, it makes everyone happy.

Ananda Vikatan rated the film 39 out of 100.

Sowmya Rajendran of The News Minute gave the film one star out of five and wrote:

Meena and Khushbu appear in a completely jarring comedy track, and it's sad to see the actors being reduced to this. Rajinikanth reels off punch dialogues faster than a jet plane but you can see that the man is tired. The affection you have for the actor makes you forgive the obvious stiffness in his body, the glaring age difference between him and the woman he's romancing, the pasty make-up and much else. But even his biggest fan would admit that this film is a colossal mess. I know you want to ask the question—is it worse than Lingaa, worse than Darbar? PACHAKILI, what do I tell you? Absolutely.

Mirchi9 gave the film one-and-three-quarters stars out of five and wrote: "Overall, Peddanna is a very formulaic and routine mass sentiment fare that is predictable and outdated from the word go. The biggest of names go through the motions providing no fun and vigour. It will be a favour to every Superstar fan if they forget the movie exists." Manoj Kumar R. of The Indian Express gave one star out of five and wrote: "Annaatthe features one of the biggest stars of India, and all it has to offer is a bunch of questionable wisdom on affection and relationships. There is something really wrong with what we consider big movies."

In 2026, Anandu Suresh of The Indian Express described the film as "the most appalling Rajinikanth film ever".
