= Daruvu =

2012 Indian film by Siva

- Film poster
- Directed by: Siva
- Screenplay by: Siva; Aadhi Narayana
- Dialogues by: Anil Ravipudi
- Produced by: Burugupalli Siva Ramakrishna
- Starring: Ravi Teja; Taapsee
- Cinematography: Vetri
- Edited by: Gautham Raju
- Music by: Vijay Antony
- Production company: Sri Venkateswara Entertainments
- Distributed by: Sri Venkateswara Film Distributors (Nizam); BlueSky Cinemas (overseas)
- Release date: 25 May 2012
- Running time: 155 minutes
- Country: India
- Language: Telugu
- Budget: ₹20 crore (US$2.1 million)

Daruvu: Sound Of Mass is a 2012 Indian Telugu-language fantasy action comedy film written and directed and co-written by Siva, produced by Burugupalli Siva Rama Krishna under Sri Venkateswara Entertainments banner and starring Ravi Teja in dual roles and Taapsee in lead roles. The soundtrack of the film is composed by Vijay Antony, while the cinematography is handled by Vetri. Anil Ravipudi penned the dialogues and Gautham Raju handled the editing department. The film is inspired from Yamudiki Mogudu. The movie was a semihit at box office.

== Plot ==
Bullet Raja (Ravi Teja) is a small-time crook with a good heart. He bumps into Swetha (Taapsee) at a function and falls in love with her, but she is already engaged to Harbour Babu (Sushant Singh), a powerful local goon. One day, using Swetha's dance master Vidya Balan (Brahmanandam), Raja and Swetha manage to run away from Babu to reach a hilltop, but Babu tracks them down and is severely beaten by Raja. At the last moment, Babu uses his car to hit Raja off the hilltop. Raja clings on to a branch growing on the hill but slips off it and falls down, yet still manages to survive. Just then, Chitragupta (M. S. Narayana) changes the story, and the car that was stuck on the edge of the hill falls down on top of Raja, and as he was crushed. The car blasts, thus killing him.

Raja heads to Yamalokam, where he realizes that his life has unjustly been terminated by Chitragupta, and so he picks up a fight with Yamadharma Raja (Prabhu). A helpless Yama gives Bullet Raja three options. Either he could be a Chinese warrior who was to die two days later, a terrorist who also has the same life span, or greedy, evil, and corrupt Home Minister of Andhra Pradesh, Ravindra (Ravi Teja), who decides to turn over a new leaf after he realizes the affection and support that the public has for him, but he is killed by his associates Balram (Sayaji Shinde), Shantaram (Avinash), and Pavitrananda (Raghu Babu). Thus, Raja decides to enter Ravindra, who seemed the most normal among them. After Raja enters into Ravindra's body, he beats up Ravindra's assassins and kills them with the help of Yamakinkaras (servants of the lord Yama), Deceives Shantaram, Balaram and Pavitrananda by usurping their assets and throwing them behind bars and reforms the political ecosystem of the ruling party. The trio (Shantaram, Balaram and Pavitrananda) receive bail with the help of Harbour Babu and try to kill Ravindra (Raja), but the trio gets reformed due to the social welfare conducted by Ravindra (Raja) with their confiscated assets. Harbour Babu gets arrested, and when Ravindra (Raja) was about to get home he was shot by a labourer who was not able to receive justice due to some mishap when Ravindra was alive. Ravindra (Raja) survives due to his good deeds, which he did from the beginning. Ravindra (Raja) gets blessings from Lord Yama as he did the righteous job by supporting the people.

== Cast ==
- Ravi Teja as
  - Bullet Raja
  - Home Minister Ravindra "Raja"
- Taapsee as Swetha, Raja/Ravindra's Love
- Satyanarayana as Yamadharmaraja Yama Sr.
- Prabhu as Yama Jr.
- Bramhanandam as Vidya Balan
- Jayasudha as Parvathamma, Ravindra/Raja's mother
- M. S. Narayana as Chitragupta
- Sayaji Shinde as Balaram, Ravindra's associate
- Avinash as Shantaram, Ravindra's associate
- Raghu Babu as Pavitrananda Swamiji, Ravindra's associate
- John Kokken as Contract Killer Bihari
- Sushant Singh as Harbour Babu
- Gollapudi Maruti Rao as Chief Minister
- Dharmavarapu Subramanyam as Simbu Sastry
- L. B. Sriram as Narada Muni
- Shanoor Sana as Swetha's mother
- Vennela Kishore as Khwaja
- Srinivasa Reddy as Ravindra's assistant
- Saptagiri as Auto Driver
- Kaushal Manda as Goon in Pub
- Fish Venkat as Babu's henchman
- Prabhas Sreenu as Police Constable
- Brahmaji
- Narsing Yadav
- Vishnupriya as Swetha's friend
- Akansha Rao as Swetha's friend
- Chatrapathi Sekhar
- Venu Yeldandi
- Meenakshi Dixit (item number) "Rajula"
- Mukti Mohan (item number)
- Jyoti Labala as Sona

== Production ==
=== Development ===
Director Siva who previously made films like Souryam, Sankham and Siruthai started working on this film in early 2011. Burugupalli Siva Rama Krishna who previously produced films like Thammudu, Sahasa Veerudu Sagara Kanya and Yuvaraju signed Ravi Teja for the film. The film was officially launched on 18 August 2011 in Hyderabad, India. After several months of filming, in January 2012 it was announced that the film was titled Daruvu. In February 2012, filming was disrupted by Telangana activists. The incident happened when the unit was filming on Osmania University campus, Hyderabad. The activists, raising slogans, ventured onto the location and damaged furniture and film equipment thus forcing the crew to call off the shoot.

=== Casting ===
Ravi Teja was the first actor who was cast in the film. In October 2011, it was announced that Taapsee Pannu who earlier worked with Ravi Teja in Veera was signed for the film. The film is a socio-fantasy flick dealing with Yama Dharmaraju and Yamalokam. Veteran actor Kaikala Satyanarayana who was famous for his portrayal of Yama Dharmaraju in several films was cast for that role. Tamil actor Prabhu was cast for the role of Yama Dharmaraju's son. Popular Kannada actor Avinash and Marathi actor Sayaji Shinde were cast for important roles in the film. Top comedians of Telugu cinema like Bramhanandam, M. S. Narayana, Raghu Babu, Dharmavarapu Subramanyam, Srinivas Reddy and Vennela Kishore were also cast for vital roles in the film.

=== Filming ===
After the film was launched in August 2011, first schedule of filming began in November 2011. Filming took place in Hyderabad and Chennai. Second schedule of filming began on 11 December 2011. Filming took place in Hyderabad, Badami and Bangkok. In January 2012, it was announced that 60% of the filming was completed. It was reported that huge sets of Yamalokam were specially designed and constructed in Ramoji Film City for the film. Filming took place in Ramoji Film City till 3 February 2012 after which three songs were shot from 5 February 2012 till 20 February 2012 in Bangkok. On 5 March 2012 it was announced that the filming will be completed by 16 March 2012 and post-production beginning soon after that.

== Soundtrack ==
The audio of the film was released on 18 April 2012 and the launch was held at Prasad labs in Hyderabad on the same day. The soundtrack of the film was composed by Vijay Antony. The lyrics for the songs were written by Bhaskarabhatla, Ramajogayya Sastry, Suddala Ashok Teja and Basha Sri. All songs except "Thom Thom" and "Athiri Chirabara" were reused from Vijay Antony's own Tamil compositions. The original version of "Rajula" is Dinesh Kanagaratnam's "Surangani Remake" from the album Tamizha (2008).

Daruvu

Soundtrack album by Vijay Antony
- Released: 18 April 2012
- Recorded: 2012
- Genre: Feature film soundtrack
- Length: 24:12
- Language: Telugu
- Label: Aditya Music
- Producer: Vijay Antony

Vijay Antony chronology
Naan (2011)	Daruvu (2012)	Sattam Oru Iruttarai (2012)

Track listing
No.	Title	Lyrics	Singer(s)	Length
1.	"Rajula" (Aathichudi – TN 07 AL 4777)	Bhaskarabhatla Ravi Kumar	Dinesh Kanagaratnam	4:21
2.	"Usumalaresay" (Usumalarase – Uthamaputhiran)	Basha Sri	Vijay Antony, Janaki Iyer, Emcee Jesz	4:25
3.	"Nijam Cheppu" (Karikalan Kala – Vettaikaran)	Bhaskarabhatla	Naresh Iyer, Sangeetha Rajeshwaran	4:15
4.	"Sexy Lady" (Sexy Lady – Ninaithale Inikkum)	Bhaskarabhatla	Benny Dayal, Andrea Jeremiah	4:24
5.	"Athiri Chirabara"	Ramajogayya Sastry	Hemachandra, Anitha Karthikeyan	4:18
6.	"Thom Thom"	Suddala Ashok Teja	Ananthu	3:09
Total length:				24:12

== Release ==
The movie was scheduled for a worldwide release on 4 May 2012 but got postponed to 18 May 2012 due to delay in the post production work. The film was again postponed and released on 25 May 2012. The film was given a U/A certificate by the CBFC.

=== Critical reception ===
Professional ratings
Review scores
Source	Rating
Rediff	2/5 stars
123telugu	2.75/5 stars

The movie met with negative reviews, however Ravi Teja's Performance received praise. Rediff gave a review stating "Daruvu may be lapped up by Ravi Teja fans but others may find it pretty dreary. If the tagline 'Sound of Mass' means that it's right for the masses, then it's got that right; a discerning audience won't find anything to cheer about. NDTV gave a review stating "Daruvu suffers from gaps in reason and logic. As a socio fantasy film, it lives on as a punch line of bad movie jokes. Even Ravi Teja's comic timing and Taapsee's simpering can't resurrect a film that has gaping plot holes you could fall into." IBN Live gave a review stating "Some people make films for themselves, and some others for juveniles. 'Daruvu' is a film made for the low brow. Even those given to mean enjoyment in an inebriated condition in the most godless hamlet would find this film cheap."

== Box office ==
The film completed 50 days on 13 July 2012 in 56 centers. The movie was a semihit at the box-office.
