= S. Damodaran (politician) =

Indian politician

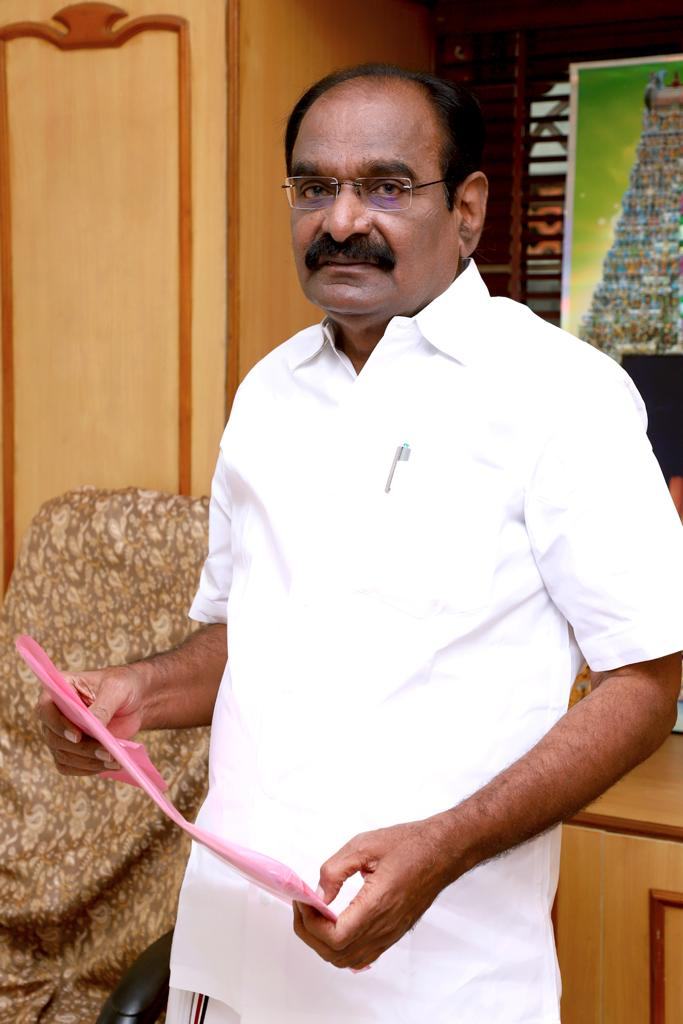
- S.Damodaran

Minister for Agriculture Tamil Nadu government
- In office 11 November 2011 – 14 July 2014
- Chief Minister: J. Jayalalitha
- Preceded by: K. A. Sengottaiyan
- Succeeded by: Agri Krishnamoorthy

Member of the Tamil Nadu Legislative Assembly
- In office 12 May 2021 – 10 May 2026
- Preceded by: Ettimadai A. Shanmugam
- Constituency: Kinathukadavu
- In office 14 May 2001 — 20 May 2016
- Preceded by: M. Shanmugham
- Succeeded by: Ettimadai A. Shanmugam
- Constituency: Kinathukadavu

Personal details
- Born: 18 September 1952 (age 73) Pollachi, Madras State, India (presently Coimbatore, India)
- Education: 10th Pass
- Occupation: Agriculture, Industrialist, Politician, Social Worker

S. Damodaran (born 18 September 1952) is an Indian politician and was a Member of the Legislative Assembly of Tamil Nadu.

S. Damodaran was born in Pollachi on 18 September 1952. He is married and has one child.

Prior to being elected to the Tamil Nadu Legislative Assembly, Damodaran was President of Thalakkarai Panchayat (1984–1989) and a member of Pollachi North Panchayat Union (1996–2001).

Damodaran, who represented the All India Anna Dravida Munnetra Kazhagam, was elected to the 14th Tamil Nadu Legislative Assembly from Kinathukadavu constituency in 2011. He had previously been elected to the Tamil Nadu Legislative Assembly from the same constituency in 2001 and 2006.

Damodaran had been a minister in the Jayalalithaa-led government of 2001–2006 and she appointed him to cabinet office again in November 2011 during a reshuffle. He took over the Agriculture portfolio from K. A. Sengottaiyan, who became Minister for Information Technology. Damodaran was replaced as Minister for Agriculture by S. S. Krishnamoorthy on 19 May 2014, when the Chief Minister, Jayalalithaa, again reshuffled her government.

The elections of 2016 resulted in his constituency being won by A. Shanmugam.
