= M. Kannappan =

Indian politician

Minister of State, (Independent Charge) Non-Conventional Energy Sources
- In office 13 October 1999 — 30 December 2003
- Prime Minister: Atal Bihari Vajpayee

Member of the Tamil Nadu Legislative Assembly
- In office 1967 — 1976
- Constituency: Kinathukadavu
- In office 1989 — 1991
- Constituency: Palladam
- In office 2006 — 2009
- Constituency: Thondamuthur

Personal details
- Party: Dravida Munnetra Kazhagam (1967-1994) (from 2009)
- Other political affiliations: Marumalarchi Dravida Munnetra Kazhagam (1994-2009)

M. Kannappan is an Indian politician and former Union minister for Non-conventional energy sources in A. B. Vajpayee's NDA rule between 1999 and 2004 Member of the Legislative Assembly of Tamil Nadu. He was elected to the Tamil Nadu legislative assembly as a Dravida Munnetra Kazhagam candidate from Kinathukadavu constituency in 1967, and 1972 elections.

He was a minister for Hindu religious endowment boards and dairy development in the government of Tamil Nadu between 1969 and 1975. He was re-elected to cabinet in 1989 when DMK returned to power as Cabinet minister for Highways, Housing and Ports. He was also the state Transport minister in M. Karunanidhi's government. He was instrumental in reviving the DMK in western Tamil Nadu after it lost elections in the 1980s. In 1994, he had a disagreement relating to the Vaiko issue with Karunanidhi, following which he left the DMK to form a new party, the MDMK. He unsuccessfully contested the Singanallur constituency in the 1996 elections but won in 1999 when fighting the Thiruchengode parliament constituency. He became union cabinet minister forging an alliance with the BJP. In 2006, he again returned to state politics and won the Thondamuthur constituency in Coimbatore district. He defeated former union minister and State congress legislative party leader S. R. Balasubramaniam.

Kannappan is often referred as "karotti kannappan" as he was the only person to come out boldly and take along Karunanidhi during all emergency periods when all of Karunanidhi's men even feared to talk in public. In mid-2008, when Karunanidhi was ill in hospital, the two men reconciled and Kannappan rejoined the DMK. and from Palladam constituency in 1989 election. He was elected as a Marumalarchi Dravida Munnetra Kazhagam from Thondamuthur constituency in 2006 election.

== Personal life ==
M. K. Muthu, a son of Kannappan, followed his father into politics as a DMK member. Kannappan's grandson Nandha is a popular actor who acted in films such as Mounam Pesiyathe and Eeram.

== Electoral performance ==
2006 Tamil Nadu Legislative Assembly election: Thondamuthur
Party	Candidate	Votes	%	±%
MDMK	M. Kannappan	123,490	41.60	+32.59
INC	S. R. Balasubramoniyan	113,596	38.27	New
DMDK	E. Dennis Kovil Pillai	37,901	12.77	New
BJP	M. Chinnaraj	13,545	4.56	New
Independent	K. Varadharajan	2,035	0.69	New
Margin of victory		9,894	3.33	−11.55
Turnout		296,863	70.65	16.93
Registered electors		420,186		
MDMK gain from TMC(M)		Swing	-8.97	

1999 Indian general election : Tiruchengode
Party	Candidate	Votes	%	±%
MDMK	M. Kannappan	409,293	49.08%	
AIADMK	Edappadi K. Palaniswami	4,04,737	48.53%	−6.17%
PT	T. M. Kanagasabapathi	11,535	1.38%	
Margin of victory		4,556	0.55%	−13.27%
Turnout		8,34,015	55.41%	−9.44%
Registered electors		15,27,064		4.57%
MDMK gain from AIADMK		Swing	-7.57%	

1996 Tamil Nadu Legislative Assembly election: Singanallur
Party	Candidate	Votes	%	±%
DMK	N. Palanisamy	92379	60.15	▲60.15
AIADMK	Duraisamy R	33967	22.12	▼33.34
MDMK	M. Kannappan	19951	12.99	New
BJP	Kalyanasundaram R	3741	2.44	▼2.25
Indian Congress (Socialist)	Palanisamy	363	0.24	▲0.24
Margin of victory		58412	38.03	
Turnout		153574	63.2	
DMK gain from AIADMK		Swing		

1991 Tamil Nadu Legislative Assembly election: Palladam
Party	Candidate	Votes	%	±%
AIADMK	K. S. Duraimurugan	69,803	61.03%	+33.61
DMK	M. Kannappan	37,079	32.42%	−6.7
BJP	A. Bala Dhandapani	4,797	4.19%	New
PMK	C. Murugan	684	0.60%	New
Margin of victory		32,724	28.61%	16.91%
Turnout		114,376	65.09%	−9.02%
Registered electors		183,291		
AIADMK gain from DMK		Swing	21.91%	

1989 Tamil Nadu Legislative Assembly election: Palladam
Party	Candidate	Votes	%	±%
DMK	M. Kannappan	45,395	39.12%	New
AIADMK	K. Sivaraj	31,819	27.42%	−26.55
INC	Sivaji Kandessamy	24,980	21.53%	New
AIADMK	K. C. Palanisamy	10,986	9.47%	−44.5
Independent	C. Subramanian	779	0.67%	New
Margin of victory		13,576	11.70%	0.53%
Turnout		116,038	74.11%	1.80%
Registered electors		159,768		
DMK gain from AIADMK		Swing	-14.85%	

1984 Tamil Nadu Legislative Assembly election: Kinathukadavu
Party	Candidate	Votes	%	±%
AIADMK	K. V. Kandaswamy	50,375	56.69%	3.10%
DMK	M. Kannappan	38,492	43.31%	
Margin of victory		11,883	13.37%	6.20%
Turnout		88,867	77.00%	7.75%
Registered electors		120,894		
AIADMK hold		Swing	3.10%	

1980 Tamil Nadu Legislative Assembly election: Pollachi
Party	Candidate	Votes	%	±%
AIADMK	M. V. Rathinam	52,833	56.61%	+11.5
DMK	M. Kannappan	39,797	42.64%	+19.43
Independent	P. Kannaiyan	704	0.75%	New
Margin of victory		13,036	13.97%	−7.93%
Turnout		93,334	70.36%	8.57%
Registered electors		134,946		
AIADMK hold		Swing	11.50%	

1977 Tamil Nadu Legislative Assembly election: Kinathukadavu
Party	Candidate	Votes	%	±%
AIADMK	K. V. Kandaswamy	25,909	36.32%	
DMK	M. Kannappan	20,589	28.86%	−39.56%
INC	S. T. Duraisamy	18,085	25.35%	
JP	K. Subbe Gounder	6,761	9.48%	
Margin of victory		5,320	7.46%	−29.39%
Turnout		71,344	66.77%	−10.79%
Registered electors		109,290		
AIADMK gain from DMK		Swing	-32.11%	

1971 Tamil Nadu Legislative Assembly election: Kinathukadavu
Party	Candidate	Votes	%	±%
DMK	M. Kannappan	47,776	68.42%	3.79%
Independent	S. T. Duraisamy	22,049	31.58%	
Margin of victory		25,727	36.84%	5.12%
Turnout		69,825	77.56%	1.05%
Registered electors		93,925		
DMK hold		Swing	3.79%	

1967 Madras Legislative Assembly election: Kinathukadavu
Party	Candidate	Votes	%	±%
DMK	M. Kannappan	40,645	64.63%	
INC	S. Gounder	20,691	32.90%	
Independent	A. C. Mylswamy	1,249	1.99%	
Independent	Ramalingam	302	0.48%	
Margin of victory		19,954	31.73%	
Turnout		62,887	76.51%	
Registered electors		85,384		
DMK win (new seat)				
