= Shourya (2010 film) =

- Directed by: Sadhu Kokila
- Screenplay by: Saadhu kokila
- Story by: J. Siva kumar
- Based on: Souryam
- Produced by: B. Basavaraj; A. Venkatesh
- Starring: Darshan; Madalasa Sharma; Avinash; Reema Wohra
- Cinematography: Ramesh Babu
- Edited by: Jo Ni Harsha
- Music by: Sadhu Kokila
- Production company: Sri Chamundeshwari Productions
- Distributed by: A. N. S. Productions
- Release date: 20 August 2010
- Running time: 155 minutes
- Country: India
- Language: Kannada

Shourya is a 2010 Indian Kannada-language action film written by J. Siva Kumar and directed by Sadhu Kokila. The film stars Darshan and Madalasa Sharma, making her debut in Kannada films, in the lead roles. It is a remake of the successful Telugu film Souryam (2008) starring Gopichand and Anushka Shetty.

The film was released on 20 August 2010 across Karnataka. Upon release, it generally met with average reviews from the critics and audience.

== Plot ==
Surya (Darshan) and Vidya (Reema Wohra) are orphan siblings who are mistreated by the local goons. They are left to earn their living by begging on the streets. Vidya comes across an orphanage organizer and he takes her as an intern much to the respite of Surya who decides to stay away from her for her benefit. After 15 years, the now adult Surya, a cop, is on a mission to look out for Vijayendra Varma (Sampath Raj) and his team who were the killers of his guardian (Avinash). How he succeeds in finding them and unites with his sister forms the rest of the story.

== Cast ==
- Darshan as Surya
- Madalasa Sharma as Shwetha
- Reema Wohra as Vidya
- Sampath Raj as Vijayendra Varma
- John Kokken
- Ravindra Nath
- Avinash
- Om Prakash Rao
- Sadhu Kokila as Jimson
- Ramesh Bhat
- Bullet Prakash
- Sathyajith
- Chitra Shenoy
- Sudha Belawadi
- Shashikala
- Stunt Siddu
- Nanjundi Nagaraj
- K. S. L. Swamy
- Bangalore Nagesh
- Thimme Gowda
- Mumaith Khan
- Anantha Velu
- Shani Mahadevappa
- Mahesh Raj

== Soundtrack ==
Shourya

Soundtrack album by Sadhu Kokila
- Released: 26 June 2010
- Genre: Film soundtrack
- Label: Ashwini Media

The audio was launched on the Ashwini Media label. The audio launch took place at a Bangalore hotel on 26 June 2010.

All lyrics are written by V. Sridhar, Tushar Ranganath, V. Nagendra Prasad and Yogaraj Bhat; all music is composed by Sadhu Kokila.

Track listing
No.	Title	Singer(s)	Length
1.	"Laka Laka"	Tippu
2.	"Kaledu Hoythu"	Kunal Ganjawala, Chinmayi
3.	"100% Preethi"	Kailash Kher, Anuradha Bhat
4.	"Saturday Nine to Nine"	Ranjith, Chaitra H. G.
5.	"Nee Ishtu Chennagidare"	Javed Ali, Anuradha Bhat

== Reception ==
=== Critical response ===
Shruti Indira Lakshminarayana of Rediff.com scored the film at 2.5 out of 5 stars and says "Fans won't be disappointed with Darshan's acting either. He is convincing as the bold cop. Madalasa has ample scope for skin show. Reema handles her role well. Ramesh Bhat, Sudha Belawadi and Avinash play minor roles. Sampath Kumar does a neat job as villain Verma. All in all, Shourya is a commercial mass entertainer that will appeal to Darshan's fans". A critic from The New Indian Express wrote "Sadhu Kokila's music is good. Bullet Prakash and Om Prakashrao have tried their best to make the audience giggle for a while during the post-intermission session. Though it is an action-oriented flick, a few sequences make the movie a worth watch for families". A critic from Deccan Herald wrote "Sampath Kumar nee Raj makes a good debut, while John Kokken is wasted. Of the female leads, Madalasa has nothing much to do, like Anushka in "Shouryam". Tall Reema Vohra (of serial Saath Saath fame) plays Darshan's sister. There's no story, but Darshan fans won't mind its absence in the midst of this slug-fest". A critic from Bangalore Mirror wrote "The comic track involving Sadhu in the first half and Bullet Prakash and Omprakash Rao in the second are a big relief to the tepid momentum the film insists on holding onto throughout. It was amusing to see frontbenchers go and touch Mumaith Khan on screen. It is gesture usually reserved for the male star on the opening day".
