= Vedi (film) =

- Theatrical release poster
- Directed by: Prabhu Deva
- Written by: Ravi Chakravarthy (dialogues)
- Story by: Siva
- Based on: Souryam (Telugu)
- Produced by: Vikram Krishna; Sriya Reddy
- Starring: Vishal; Sameera Reddy; Poonam Kaur
- Cinematography: R. D. Rajasekhar
- Edited by: V. T. Vijayan
- Music by: Vijay Antony
- Production company: GK Film Corporation
- Release date: 30 September 2011
- Running time: 138 minutes
- Country: India
- Language: Tamil

Vedi (transl. Firecracker) is a 2011 Indian Tamil-language action film directed by Prabhu Deva. The film stars Vishal, Sameera Reddy and Poonam Kaur, while Vivek, Sayaji Shinde, and Urvashi play supporting roles. A remake of the 2008 Telugu film Souryam, it was released on 30 September 2011.

== Plot ==
Vedi tells the story of Prabhakaran, a young police officer who goes to Kolkata in search of his sister Aishwarya. Prabhakaran, at his native place Thoothukudi, had developed enmity with a local don named Easwaramoorthy by thrashing him in public and putting him behind bars. The enmity reaches Kolkata when Easwaramoorthy joins another local gangster to take revenge on Prabhakaran. The baddies trouble Aishwarya and her friend Parvathy, who falls in love with Prabhakaran. While the enmity between Prabhakaran and Easwaramoorthy continues, a flashback of Prabhakaran goes on. Prabhakaran and Aishwarya were ill-treated by the society as their father was a smuggler. Prabhakaran decides to send Aishwarya to an orphanage, saying that he does not know who she is. This creates a bad name about Prabhakaran in Aishwarya's books. Later, Aishwarya gets adopted by a North Indian family and settles in Kolkata. In a parallel scenario, Prabhakaran locks horns with Easwaramoorthy and his pervert son Rajapandi. They kill his mentor, who made him a police officer, and the occasion of giving a doctorate to Easwaramoorthy, Rajapandi gets tempted of a lady constable outside the stadium and rapes her inside his car. After a few years, Aishwarya's foster parents die of an accident, and she is sent to an orphanage again. Therefore, Prabhakaran goes to Kolkata and masquerades himself as Balu, a physical trainer in a college as he is scared that Aishwarya might avoid him. How Prabhakaran defeats the baddies and joins with Aishwarya is the action-packed climax of the film.

== Cast ==
- Vishal as ASP Prabhakaran IPS / Balu
- Poonam Kaur as Aishwarya
- Sameera Reddy as Parvathy "Paaru"
- Vivek as Varun Sandhesh
- Sayaji Shinde as Easwaramoorthy
- Urvashi as Dr. Radha Jeyachandran
- Sriman as Sreenivasan "Cheemachu"
- Raviprakash as Parvathy's father
- Uma Padmanabhan as Parvathy's mother
- Amit Kumar Tiwari as Rajapandi
- Anu Mohan as Police constable
- Devan as SP Shanmuganathan
- Bava Lakshmanan as Kali temple priest
- Pandu as Easwaramoorthy's brother-in-law
- Sampath Ram as Easwaramoorthy's henchman
- Sneha Nambiar as P. Kalai Selvi
- Cell Murugan as Balloon seller
- Devi Sri Prasad in a special appearance in the song "Kadhalikka"
- Sophie Choudry in an item number "Bombay Ponnu"

== Production ==
Initially Trisha Krishnan was approached for the lead female role but turned it down as the role did not excite her. Similarly Anushka Shetty refused the project, while Hansika Motwani cited that her call sheet was full. Reports emerged that Samantha, Kajal Aggarwal, Tamannaah Bhatia and Reema Sen were considered, before the role was handed to Sameera Reddy. Poonam Kaur signed the film in March 2011, agreeing to reprise her role as the protagonist's sister from the original film Souryam.

Vishal began his first schedule in February 2011, after completing work on his other film Avan Ivan. An item number featuring Sophie Choudry was choreographed by the director Prabhu Deva. By May 2011, it was reported that 80% of the shoot was completed after scenes were shot in Bidar, a district in the north of Karnataka.

== Soundtrack ==
Vedi's soundtrack was composed by Vijay Antony. Karthik Srinivasan of Milliblog! wrote, "Despite becoming a mainstream composer, Vijay Antony’s wild swings between decent, listenable stuff and massively coarse music is a stunning mystery!"

Track listing
No.	Title	Lyrics	Singer(s)	Length
1.	"Enna Aachi"	Thamarai	Vijay Yesudas, Janaki Iyer	4:47
2.	"Ichu Ichu"	Vaali	Vijay Antony, Sangeetha Rajeshwaran	3:48
3.	"Ippadi Mazhai"	Na. Muthukumar	Karthik, Saindhavi	4:23
4.	"Bombay Ponnu"	Viveka	Mamta Sharma, Senthildass, M. L. R. Karthikeyan	3:56
5.	"Kadhalikka Penroruthi"	Kabilan	Emcee Jesz, Naresh Iyer, Andrea Jeremiah, Sharmila	4:34
Total length:				21:28

== Critical reception ==
Haricharan Pudipeddi of Nowrunning.com rated the film 3/5 and called it" a loud cracker". A critic from The New Indian Express wrote, "A pedestrian script with no gripping moments, Vedi has nothing novel or exciting to offer a viewer by way of plot or narration". Pavithra Srinivasan of Rediff.com rated the film 2/5 stars and wrote, "Vedi is just another run-of-the-mill entertainer".
