= Vetri (cinematographer) =

Indian cinematographer

Vetrivel Palanisamy
- Born: Vetrivel Palanisamy; Palladam Tirupur, Tamil Nadu, India
- Other names: Vetri; Vetri Palanisamy
- Education: Film and Television Institute of Tamil Nadu
- Occupation: Director of photography
- Years active: 2007-present
- Parent: N. S. Palanisamy (father)

Vetrivel Palanisamy is an Indian cinematographer who primarily works in Tamil and Telugu film industries. He is an alumnus of Film and Television Institute of Tamil Nadu, Chennai. He is known for his work in films such as Souryam, Muni 2: Kanchana, Veeram, Vedalam, Viswasam and Annaatthe.

== Early life and career ==
Vetri hails from a village located in the Tiruppur district of Tamil Nadu. After completing the Diploma in film Technology in Cinematography Vetri started assisting with Cinematographer S. Saravanan in the films like Aahaa..!, Auto Driver, Sangamam, Oruvan, Vallarasu, Maayi. Vetri made his debut as a cinematographer in the film Agaram and then he got a break with the action drama film Thenavattu (2008), before working on the comedy Maasilamani (2009) and the successful horror film, Muni 2: Kanchana (2011) with Raghava Lawrence.

Vetri has often collaborated with director Siva and has been a part of his Telugu films, Souryam (2008), Sankham (2009), and Daruvu (2012), as well as his Tamil films with Ajith Kumar: Veeram (2014), Vedalam (2015), Vivegam (2017), and Viswasam (2019). The pair had earlier studied together at M.G.R. Government Film and Television Training Institute.

== Filmography ==
Year	Film	Language	Notes
2007	Agaram	Tamil	Debut
2007	Rameswaram	Tamil	
2008	Thenavattu	Tamil	
2008	Souryam	Telugu	Debut in Telugu cinema
2009	Maasilamani	Tamil	
2009	Sankham	Telugu	
2011	Venghai	Tamil	
2011	Muni 2: Kanchana	Tamil	
2011	Vellore Maavattam	Tamil	
2012	Daruvu	Telugu	
2013	Ya Ya	Tamil	
2014	Veeram	Tamil	
2014	Loukyam	Telugu	
2015	Vedalam	Tamil	
2017	Vivegam	Tamil	
2017	Oxygen	Telugu	
2019	Viswasam	Tamil	
2019	Kanchana 3	Tamil	
2019	Chanakya	Telugu	
2020	Laxmii	Hindi	Debut in Hindi cinema
2021	Annaatthe	Tamil	
2023	Ramabanam	Telugu	
2024	Kanguva	Tamil	
