= Kinathukadavu Assembly constituency =

One of the 234 State Legislative Assembly Constituencies in Tamil Nadu, in India

Coordinates: 10.82°N 77.02°E

Kinathukadavu
- Constituency No. 122 for the Tamil Nadu Legislative Assembly

Constituency details
- Country: India
- Region: South India
- State: Tamil Nadu
- District: Coimbatore
- Lok Sabha constituency: Pollachi
- Established: 1967
- Total electors: 305,919
- Reservation: None

Member of Legislative Assembly
- 17th Tamil Nadu Legislative Assembly
- Incumbent K. Vignesh
- Party: TVK
- Elected year: 2026

Kinathukadavu is a legislative assembly constituency that includes a few parts of the south of Coimbatore City. It comes under Pollachi Lok Sabha constituency for Parliamentary elections. It is one of the 234 State Legislative Assembly Constituencies in Tamil Nadu, in India.

== Members of the Legislative Assembly ==
Year	Winner	Party
1967	M. Kannappan	Dravida Munnetra Kazhagam
1971	M. Kannappan	Dravida Munnetra Kazhagam
1977	K. V. Kandaswamy	All India Anna Dravida Munnetra Kazhagam
1980	K. V. Kandaswamy	All India Anna Dravida Munnetra Kazhagam
1984	K. V. Kandaswamy	All India Anna Dravida Munnetra Kazhagam
1989	K. Kandasamy	Dravida Munnetra Kazhagam
1991	N. S. Palanisamy	All India Anna Dravida Munnetra Kazhagam
1996	M. Shanmugham	Dravida Munnetra Kazhagam
2001	S. Damodaran	All India Anna Dravida Munnetra Kazhagam
2006	S. Damodaran	All India Anna Dravida Munnetra Kazhagam
2011	S. Damodaran	All India Anna Dravida Munnetra Kazhagam
2016	A. Shanmugam	All India Anna Dravida Munnetra Kazhagam
2021	S. Damodaran	All India Anna Dravida Munnetra Kazhagam
2026	K. Vignesh	Tamilaga Vettri Kazhagam

== Election results ==
Vote share of winning candidates
2026	37.31%
2021	44.12%
2016	42.81%
2011	56.17%
2006	47.10%
2001	50.33%
1996	49.42%
1991	65.88%
1989	37.51%
1984	56.69%
1980	53.58%
1977	36.32%
1971	68.42%
1967	64.63%

=== 2026 ===
2026 Tamil Nadu Legislative Assembly election: Kinathukadavu
Party	Candidate	Votes	%	±%
TVK	Vignesh K	99,950	37.31	New
DMK	Sabari Karthikeyan	88,240	32.94	▼10.70
AIADMK	S. Damodaran	67,789	25.30	▼18.82
NTK	M. Banupriya	9,667	3.61	▼1.29
NOTA	NOTA	1,717	0.64	▼0.35
Margin of victory		11,710	4.37	▲3.89
Turnout		2,67,917	87.58	▲17.17
Registered electors		3,05,919		▼20,949
TVK gain from AIADMK		Swing	▲37.31	

=== 2021 ===
2021 Tamil Nadu Legislative Assembly election: Kinathukadavu
Party	Candidate	Votes	%	±%
AIADMK	S. Damodaran	101,537	44.12	1.31
DMK	Kurichi Prabhakaran	100,442	43.64	1.47
MNM	A. Siva	13,939	6.06	New
NTK	M. Umajagadesh	11,280	4.90	3.97
NOTA	Nota	2,280	0.99	−0.88
AMMK	Ma. Pa. Rohini	1,248	0.54	New
Margin of victory		1,095	0.48	−0.16
Turnout		230,155	70.41	0.41
Rejected ballots		241	0.10	
Registered electors		326,868		
AIADMK hold		Swing	1.31	

=== 2016 ===
2016 Tamil Nadu Legislative Assembly election: Kinathukadavu
Party	Candidate	Votes	%	±%
AIADMK	A. Shanmugam	89,042	42.81	−13.36
DMK	Kurichi Prabhakaran	87,710	42.17	4.06
BJP	V. Muthuramalingam	11,354	5.46	2.72
MDMK	V. Eswaran	8,387	4.03	
NOTA	None Of The Above	3,884	1.87	
NTK	U. Selvakumar	1,946	0.94	
KMDK	S. Selvakumar	1,863	0.90	
SDPI	M. Abdul Kareem	1,367	0.66	
PMK	R. Chinnasami	1,265	0.61	
Margin of victory		1,332	0.64	−17.42
Turnout		207,989	70.00	−8.07
Registered electors		297,116		
AIADMK hold		Swing	-13.36	

=== 2011 ===
2011 Tamil Nadu Legislative Assembly election: Kinathukadavu
Party	Candidate	Votes	%	±%
AIADMK	S. Damodaran	94,123	56.17%	9.07%
DMK	M. Kannappan	63,857	38.11%	−4.62%
BJP	K. Dharmalingam	4,587	2.74%	0.81%
Loktantrik Samajwadi	Dr. B. Ilango	1,737	1.04%	
Independent	S. Nagaraj	1,592	0.95%	
Independent	K. Muruganantham	1,069	0.64%	
Margin of victory		30,266	18.06%	13.69%
Turnout		214,627	78.07%	2.79%
Registered electors		167,567		
AIADMK hold		Swing	9.07%	

=== 2006 ===
2006 Tamil Nadu Legislative Assembly election: Kinathukadavu
Party	Candidate	Votes	%	±%
AIADMK	S. Damodaran	55,493	47.10%	−3.23%
DMK	K. V. Kandaswamy	50,343	42.73%	22.78%
DMDK	C. B. Latharani	5,449	4.63%	
BJP	V. Muthu Ramalingam	2,267	1.92%	
Independent	R. Rangarasu	1,937	1.64%	
Independent	M. Aaran	1,142	0.97%	
Independent	V. Amirthalingam	792	0.67%	
Margin of victory		5,150	4.37%	−26.01%
Turnout		117,812	75.29%	9.44%
Registered electors		156,481		
AIADMK hold		Swing	-3.23%	

=== 2001 ===
2001 Tamil Nadu Legislative Assembly election: Kinathukadavu
Party	Candidate	Votes	%	±%
AIADMK	S. Damodaran	55,958	50.33%	14.93%
DMK	M. Shanmugham	22,178	19.95%	−29.47%
Independent	K. V. Kandaswamy	18,040	16.23%	
MDMK	K. Kandasamy	15,004	13.50%	1.68%
Margin of victory		33,780	30.38%	16.36%
Turnout		111,180	65.85%	−6.88%
Registered electors		168,931		
AIADMK gain from DMK		Swing	0.91%	

=== 1996 ===
1996 Tamil Nadu Legislative Assembly election: Kinathukadavu
Party	Candidate	Votes	%	±%
DMK	M. Shanmugham	49,231	49.42%	16.88%
AIADMK	K. M. Mylswamy	35,267	35.40%	−30.47%
MDMK	K. Kandasamy	11,774	11.82%	
BJP	R. Santhil Kumara Murthy	1,461	1.47%	
Independent	K. V. Gurusamy	849	0.85%	
Margin of victory		13,964	14.02%	−19.32%
Turnout		99,612	72.73%	3.97%
Registered electors		149,817		
DMK gain from AIADMK		Swing	-16.46%	

=== 1991 ===
1991 Tamil Nadu Legislative Assembly election: Kinathukadavu
Party	Candidate	Votes	%	±%
AIADMK	N. S. Palanisamy	64,358	65.88%	42.68%
DMK	K. Kandasamy	31,792	32.54%	−4.97%
AAP	C. M. Aruchamy	112	0.11%	
Independent	K. Arumugham	97	0.10%	
Margin of victory		32,566	33.34%	19.03%
Turnout		97,691	68.76%	−7.52%
Registered electors		147,834		
AIADMK gain from DMK		Swing	28.37%	

=== 1989 ===
1989 Tamil Nadu Legislative Assembly election: Kinathukadavu
Party	Candidate	Votes	%	±%
DMK	K. Kandasamy	36,897	37.51%	−5.80%
AIADMK	N. Appadurai	22,824	23.20%	−33.48%
AIADMK	K. V. Kamdasamy	22,162	22.53%	−34.15%
INC	S. P. Kailasappan	15,606	15.87%	
Independent	N. Krishnasamy	581	0.59%	
Margin of victory		14,073	14.31%	0.94%
Turnout		98,362	76.28%	−0.72%
Registered electors		132,646		
DMK gain from AIADMK		Swing	-19.17%	

=== 1984 ===
1984 Tamil Nadu Legislative Assembly election: Kinathukadavu
Party	Candidate	Votes	%	±%
AIADMK	K. V. Kandaswamy	50,375	56.69%	3.10%
DMK	M. Kannappan	38,492	43.31%	
Margin of victory		11,883	13.37%	6.20%
Turnout		88,867	77.00%	7.75%
Registered electors		120,894		
AIADMK hold		Swing	3.10%	

=== 1980 ===
1980 Tamil Nadu Legislative Assembly election: Kinathukadavu
Party	Candidate	Votes	%	±%
AIADMK	K. V. Kandaswamy	42,822	53.58%	17.27%
INC	S. T. Doraiswamy	37,093	46.42%	21.07%
Margin of victory		5,729	7.17%	−0.29%
Turnout		79,915	69.26%	2.49%
Registered electors		118,093		
AIADMK hold		Swing	17.27%	

=== 1977 ===
1977 Tamil Nadu Legislative Assembly election: Kinathukadavu
Party	Candidate	Votes	%	±%
AIADMK	K. V. Kandaswamy	25,909	36.32%	
DMK	M. Kannappan	20,589	28.86%	−39.56%
INC	S. T. Duraisamy	18,085	25.35%	
JP	K. Subbe Gounder	6,761	9.48%	
Margin of victory		5,320	7.46%	−29.39%
Turnout		71,344	66.77%	−10.79%
Registered electors		109,290		
AIADMK gain from DMK		Swing	-32.11%	

=== 1971 ===
1971 Tamil Nadu Legislative Assembly election: Kinathukadavu
Party	Candidate	Votes	%	±%
DMK	M. Kannappan	47,776	68.42%	3.79%
Independent	S. T. Duraisamy	22,049	31.58%	
Margin of victory		25,727	36.84%	5.12%
Turnout		69,825	77.56%	1.05%
Registered electors		93,925		
DMK hold		Swing	3.79%	

=== 1967 ===
1967 Madras Legislative Assembly election: Kinathukadavu
Party	Candidate	Votes	%	±%
DMK	M. Kannappan	40,645	64.63%	
INC	S. Gounder	20,691	32.90%	
Independent	A. C. Mylswamy	1,249	1.99%	
Independent	Ramalingam	302	0.48%	
Margin of victory		19,954	31.73%	
Turnout		62,887	76.51%	
Registered electors		85,384		
DMK win (new seat)				
