= N. S. Palanisamy =

Indian politician

Personal details
- Born: Tiruppur, Coimbatore district, Madras Presidency, British India.
- Died: 18 May 2016 (aged 73–74)
- Party: Anna Dravida Munnetra Kazhagam; Non-political Farmers’ Association of Tamil Nadu
- Spouse: Rathinam
- Children: 3 Vetri (son)

N. Sami Gounder Palanisamy a.k.a. NSP was an Indian politician and former Member of the Legislative Assembly of Tamil Nadu. He was elected to the Tamil Nadu legislative assembly as an Anna Dravida Munnetra Kazhagam candidate from Kinathukadavu constituency in 1991.

== Personal life ==
N S Palanisamy was born to Sami Gounder and Samathal. He was the only son of his parents and his sister is Rukmani. N S Palanisamy was married to Rathinam and they have two sons and one daughter. His younger son, Vetri Palanisamy, is a well known cinematographer in Tamil and Telugu cinema.

== Political career ==
N S Palanisamy worked as an English lecturer in Coimbatore college, but he quit his job and took up agriculture. He was an active politician and always worked for the welfare of the farmers. He was Member of the Legislative Assembly (MLA) of Tamil Nadu Assembly in 1991 from Kinathukadavu constituency, part of Pollachi. He was elected as an Anna Dravida Munnetra Kazhagam candidate. N S Palanisamy was the president of Non-political Farmers’ Association of Tamil Nadu.

He died on 18 May 2016 aged 73 from health issues related to kidney failure.
