= Maasilamani =

- Film poster
- Directed by: R. N. R. Manohar
- Written by: R. N. R. Manohar
- Produced by: Kalpathi S. Aghoram; Kalpathi S. Ganesh; Kalpathi S. Suresh
- Starring: Nakul; Sunaina; Pawan
- Cinematography: Vetri
- Edited by: Manoj
- Music by: D. Imman
- Production company: AGS Entertainment
- Distributed by: Sun Pictures
- Release date: 12 June 2009
- Running time: 150 minutes
- Country: India
- Language: Tamil

Maasilamani is a 2009 Indian Tamil-language romantic action comedy film directed by debutant R. N. R. Manohar and produced by AGS Entertainment. It stars Nakul and Sunaina, in their second collaboration after Kadhalil Vizhunthen, while Pawan, Santhanam, Karunas, Srinath and M. S. Bhaskar appear in supporting roles. The music was composed by D. Imman with cinematography and editing by Vetri and Manoj. Maasilamani was released on 12 June 2009 and became a commercial success.

== Plot ==
Maasilamani, also known as Maasi, is an orphan living in a lower-middle-class colony. With a heart of gold, he is a popular figure who takes up local issues, fights for justice, and is considered a rowdy by those who do not know him well. Divya, a wealthy upper-middle-class girl, is a dance instructor with whom Maasi falls in love at first sight. However, Divya is put off by his rowdy behavior—especially after he ruins her dance competition—and is offended by his proposal.

Urged by his friends, Maasi attempts to win over her family by pretending to be a well-mannered person under the alias "Mani." Everyone except Divya is aware that Mani and Maasi are the same person. When Divya discovers the truth—while witnessing him beating someone—she finds herself torn about whom to choose.

Bhoopathy, the new local inspector who is also interested in Divya, is determined to expose Maasi. He tries to prove that Mani is actually Maasi and begins troubling Maasi's relatives. Selvi, Maasi's cousin (his aunt's daughter), is injured in an accident caused by Bhoopathy. She reveals the truth to Maasi and her mother. Meanwhile, Divya rejects Bhoopathy's marriage proposal and chooses Mani to be her husband. Maasi confronts Bhoopathy for harassing his family.

Later, Maasi stages a fake death to make Divya realize her true feelings. She recognizes her mistake, and the two embrace, reuniting in love.

== Cast ==
- Nakul as Maasilamani
- Sunaina as Divya Ramanathan, Maasilamani's love-interest
- Pawan as Sub Inspector Bhoopathy Perumalsamy
- Shathiga as Tinku, Divya's sister
- Delhi Ganesh as Retired Tahsildar Ramanathan, Divya and Tinku's father
- Meera Krishnan as Divya and Tinku's mother
- Tatineni Rajeshwari as Divya's grandmother
- Santhanam as Pazhani, Maasilamani's friend
- Srinath as Kathir, Maasilamani's friend
- M. S. Bhaskar as 'Coma' Ramaswamy
- Karunas as the unknown man who betrays 'Coma' Ramaswamy by stealing his money
- Santhana Bharathi as Councillor
- Manobala as Advocate
- Raj Kapoor as Kanthuvatti
- T. K. Kala as the woman who was assaulted by Bhoopathy
- Rajendranath as Police Inspector
- KVM Kannan as Judge
- Tharini as Karpagam
- Harini as Priya, Divya's student
- Azhagu as Police Officer
- Krishna
- Mahima
- V. Mahadevan

== Soundtrack ==
The songs were composed by D. Imman.

Song	Singer(s)	Lyrics
"Chikku Chikku Boom Boom"	Keerthi Sagathia, Feji, Baby Harini	Viveka
"Dora Dora"	Balram, Chinmayi, Kalyani nair	P. Vijay
"Nacka Romba Nacka"	Benny Dayal, Rita	Na. Muthukumar
"O Divya O Divya"	Shaan	P. Vijay
"Odi Odi Vilayada"	Mukesh Mohamed, SuVi, Emcee Jesz	Na. Muthukumar, Emcee Jesz

== Critical reception ==
A critic from Chennai Online wrote, "Maasilamani is an unpretentious attempt at a masala film sans logic or finesse. Nevertheless, it works as an entertainer with comic elements, helped by the chemistry between lead pair Nakulan and Sunaina and twists in the tale". Pavithra Srinivasan of Rediff.com wrote, "It might be run-of-the-mill, but Maasilamani does have its enjoyable moments. If you want to kill a couple of hours, here's the flick for you". Malathi Rangarajan of The Hindu wrote, "Finding his way into a rather arresting romantic arena, writer-director R.N.R. Manohar holds the viewer’s attention for quite a while. Sad that the interesting ascent climaxes in a run-of-the-mill finale".

== Box office ==
The film opened at number 1 at the Chennai box office. The trade attributed this "decent opening" to aggressive campaigning of the film on television.
