= Vedalam =

2015 Indian film by Siva

- Theatrical release poster
- Directed by: Siva
- Written by: Siva; Aadhi Narayana
- Produced by: S. Aishwarya
- Starring: Ajith Kumar; Shruti Haasan; Lakshmi Menon
- Cinematography: Vetri Palanisamy
- Edited by: Ruben
- Music by: Anirudh Ravichander
- Production company: Sri Sai Raam Creations
- Release date: 10 November 2015
- Running time: 154 minutes
- Country: India
- Language: Tamil

Vedalam (Tamil pronunciation: [ˈʋeːd̪aːɭam]; transl. Phantom) is a 2015 Indian Tamil-language action film directed and co-written by Siva. It stars Ajith Kumar, Shruti Haasan and Lakshmi Menon while Ashwin Kakumanu, Rahul Dev, Thambi Ramaiah, Kabir Duhan Singh, and Soori play supporting roles. The film features music composed by Anirudh Ravichander, while the cinematography and editing were done by Vetri and Ruben.

The project was announced in mid-2014 after the success of Ajith and Siva's previous collaboration, Veeram, where in October 2014, Rathnam was announced to lead the production. The team underwent significant changes with the film's cast and crew, and the completion of Ajith's other film, Yennai Arindhaal, delayed the film's production. Principal photography began in April 2015, with filming taking place in major portions across Kolkata, and also in Chennai and Milan, Italy, and was completed that October. The film began production under the working title Thala 56, before Vedalam was officially announced in September 2015.

Vedalam was released worldwide on 10 November 2015 coinciding with Diwali. The film grossed around ₹120–150 crore at the box office upon its release and was a profitable venture for the traders and exhibitors. It was remade in Telugu as Bhola Shankar (2023).

== Plot ==
The film begins with a police unit being instructed by their officer to capture the trio of brothers who head a French human trafficking ring - Rahul, Abhinay and Aniket. The group is successful in intercepting Rahul on his plane, but he holds the families of the officers of the unit hostage with the help of his men, thereby turning on the officer-in-charge and shooting him. Before the officer-in-charge dies, he tells Rahul that he'd be killed by a good man for his deeds, but Rahul says that the very personification of an evil man will kill him.

The story then shifts to Kolkata where a man named Ganesh arrives with his sister Thamizh to enrol her in an arts college, where he becomes friends with "Kolkata" Kaali, who escorts Ganesh and Thamizh to their new house. After enrolling Thamizh, Ganesh works at a taxi company under his boss, Laxmidas, where he gets his first customer, a lawyer named Swetha, who makes Ganesh pose as a fake mute eyewitness in a case in exchange for not paying the fare. Ganesh does so, but his phone rings and the judge fires her when Ganesh talks in front of everyone. Swetha tries to kill Ganesh, but Laxmidas saves him, though he is embarrassed by Ganesh. Shwetha and Laxmidas team up to take revenge on Ganesh, but Shwetha later falls for him after she realises her mistake. Ganesh arranges Tamizh's marriage with Swetha's brother Arjun.

Meanwhile, DCP Yashpal calls Ganesh and the other drivers and asks them to report any activities by crime syndicate members who have been causing trouble in the city. Ganesh reports a case of arms trafficking, which leads to Aniket and his men capturing and presenting him before Aniket at his private boatyard. Aniket orders his men to kill Ganesh, but Ganesh surprisingly single-handedly defeats all his men and kills Aniket, thereby revealing his true maniac, ruthless self. Learning about the death of his brother, Abhinay reaches India and investigates the murder the next day, where he and his technical crew track Ganesh's mobile signal to their own building. Ganesh enters the building, ambushes the entire squad, and kills Abhinay. Swetha follows Ganesh and is horrified by his actions. When Ganesh reveals that he is a murderer and will kill again, she tells him that she will stop the marriage between Arjun and Thamizh, but Ganesh reveals that Thamizh is not his sister and reveals his past.

Past: Ganesh is a ruthless thug-for-hire called Vedalam who meets Thamizh at the hospital after his enemies stab him. A builder threatens Thamizh and her blind parents to sell their house for a company site, where she and her friend Esther hire Vedalam, who betrays them, having been paid earlier a higher amount, and the family leaves their home and starts living in Vedalam's home. Vedalam mistakes their innocent activities for their antics and becomes annoyed. However, Thamizh and her parents leave as a sign of gratitude after Vedalam unknowingly saves Thamizh and the other girls from being trafficked by the syndicate by Abhinay and Aniket. The syndicate finds them vulnerable on the streets. Abhinay and Aniket kill Thamizh's parents and injure her. Vedalam, who has a change of heart, rescues Thamizh, who loses her memory and states that he is her brother and takes care of her. Ganesh makes sure not to show his true ruthless self in front of Thamizh and thereby masks a demure identity.

Present: Ganesh reveals that he killed Abhinay and Aniket in revenge for killing Thamizh's parents and avenging their death. He requests Swetha not to reveal this to Thamizh, and Shwetha accepts Thamizh's marriage. After learning about his brother's death, Rahul uses an injured victim of Ganesh's assault to find his brother's killer. Rahul coincidentally hires Thamizh to draw a forensic sketch. Ganesh comes prepared and takes one of Rahul's assistant's son hostage to ensure Thamizh's freedom. Rahul abducts Thamizh, and Ganesh chases after him through the streets of Kolkata. Ganesh finally tracks Rahul down, as his vehicle is stopped by a Navratri procession, and they both fight when an anguished Thamizh urges him to shoot Rahul. Ganesh picks up the gun and shoots in the wrong direction to distract Thamizh and finally kills Rahul. Ganesh and Thamizh return to their home, and Tamizh later gets happily married to Arjun.

== Cast ==
- Ajith Kumar as Ganesh a.k.a. Vedalam, a ruthless thug who reformed his ways
- Shruti Haasan as Shweta
- Lakshmi Menon as Thamizharasi a.k.a. Thamizh, Ganesh's adopted sister
- Ashwin Kakumanu as Arjun
- Rahul Dev as Rahul, an international women trafficking gangster and a dreadful syndicate crime boss
- Kabir Duhan Singh as Abhinay, Rahul's and Ankit's brother
- Aniket Chouhan as Aniket, Rahul's and Abhinay's younger brother
- Soori as Laxmidas
- Rajendran as "Kolkata" Kaali
- Thambi Ramaiah as Thamizh's blind father
- Avinash as Rahul's assistant
- Mansoor Ali Khan as Manimaran
- Sudha as Gomathi
- Mayilsamy as Ganesh's house owner in Kolkata
- Appukutty as Kuzhandai, Vedalam's assistant
- Yogi Babu as Chatterjee, Kaali's henchman
- Kovai Sarala as Maalu
- Raviraj as Shweta's and Arjun's father
- Sriranjani as Shweta's and Arjun's mother
- Vidyullekha Raman as Esther, Thamizh's friend
- Sharmila Thapa as Lakshmi
- Nagineedu as Doctor
- Bala Saravanan as Balu, Swetha's junior
- Swaminathan as Swamy, Swetha's junior
- Ramesh Thilak as phony witness
- Rajkumar as Arjun's friend
- Sreeja Ravi as Nurse
- Tamilselvi as Receptionist
- Meera Krishnan as the House Owner's wife
- Kalairani as Victim's mother
- R. N. R. Manohar as the corrupt police officer working for Abhinay and Aniket
- D. R. K. Kiran as a gangster from Bombay
- Amit Tiwari as Aniket's henchman
- Jasper as Manimaran's brother
- Tej Sapru as Abhinay's henchman
- Mukhtar Khan as Yashpal
- Sukran as Sub-Inspector
- Aryan Ashik as Doctor
- Mippu as Ganesh's henchman
- Kannan Ponnaiya as Ganesh's henchman
- Billy Murali as Squad member

== Production ==
=== Development ===
Following the success of their previous collaboration Veeram (2014), Siva was reported to direct Ajith Kumar again in July 2014, with the planned venture announced to begin after the completion of Ajith's prior commitments with Yennai Arindhaal. Siva worked on the script in Bangalore and approached leading production companies, including PVP Cinema, to produce the film, though Sri Sai Raam Creations was eventually confirmed to finance the project. The film was developed with the tentative title Thala 56, before it was confirmed that it would be titled as Vedalam in September 2015.

=== Casting ===
Hansika Motwani and Shruti Haasan were reported to play female leads. Motwani denied that she was going to appear, and Haasan's casting was confirmed in early April. In the same month, Kabir Duhan Singh was reported to be the antagonist. After unsuccessful negotiations with Nithya Menen, Lakshmi Menon was announced to play the role of Ganesh's sister in April 2015. Santhanam, who initially signed a comic role, was replaced by Soori after he became busy with his own productions.

=== Filming ===
Principal photography began on 9 April 2015. The first official schedule began shooting in Navalur, Chennai, with scenes featuring Ajith and Menon entering a college. Later, a Vinayagar Chathurthi-themed song featuring 150 background dancers was shot. Sources reported that the song was similar to "Pillayarpatti Hero" from Vaanmathi (1996) and "Maha Ganapathi" from Amarkkalam (1999), both also starring Ajith.

The team moved to Kolkata and scenes were shot featuring Haasan as a lawyer and Ajith as a taxi driver, with images from the shoot leaked on social networking sites. The makers planned to shoot scenes in Dubai, but the government of the United Arab Emirates (UAE) denied permission to shoot there as it would potentially disrupt the month-long Ramadan celebrations. The unit instead moved to shoot few scenes and a song sequence in Milan, Italy.

The unit returned to Chennai in August 2015 to film in Chennai. Scenes were shot at Ramee Mall and a special set was erected at AVM Studios in Vadapalani, Guindy Race Course, and Fortis Malar Hospital, featuring Ajith and Haasan. The team finished production in mid-October 2015 after making finishing touches on a song. Ajith was injured on the final day of the shoot, causing a minor delay. Despite his injury, Ajith immediately dubbed for the film to ensure that its release would not be delayed.

== Music ==
The film's soundtrack was composed by Anirudh Ravichander. The album featured four songs written by Madhan Karky, Rokesh, Viveka, and Siva, and a theme track. The audio rights were purchased by Sony Music India. The complete album was released on 21 October 2015.

== Release ==
=== Theatrical ===
In May 2015, Rathnam confirmed that the film would be released on Diwali, 10 November 2015. In September 2015, Ajith's manager Suresh Chandraa officially confirmed via Twitter that the title and the first screening would release on midnight, which confirmed the title to be Vedalam.

Prior to the official release, the introductory scenes and songs were leaked onto the Internet. The film was released on 10 November 2015, during Diwali, clashing with Thoongaavanam.

=== Home media ===
The film's television premiere took place via Jaya TV on 5 September 2016, coinciding with Ganesh Chathurthi.

== Reception ==
=== Critical response ===
M. Suganth of The Times of India rated the film 3 out of 5 and called it "A packaged mass entertainer for Ajith fans and family audiences". Sify gave a rating of 3 out of 5 and stated, "Vedhalam is Ajith's one man show and it might enthrall his ardent fans for others, it's a formulaic film with few enjoyable moments." Gauthaman Bhaskaran of the Hindustan Times gave 1.5 out of 5 stars and stated "Vedalam is but an Ajith Kumar show (all the way where Menon and Haasan are wasted). The man arrives with a big bang and never tires of bashing up baddies -- but now and then taking a break to cleanse society of minor evils like fooling law courts or cheating on wives. Certainly not for children, who might wonder how Phantom sprung out of their favourite comic books in such a horrifically mutated form." India Today gave the film a rating of 2.5 out of 5 stars and stated "Siruthai Siva has worked the "mass" image of Ajith in Vedalam and the family sentiments to his advantage. In the process, he has not cared much about logic, which goes right out of the window."

News18 gave the film 2 out of 5 and stated, "Vedalam is another star vehicle that rides with expectations and mutilations." Sudhir Srinivasan of The Hindu said that "Vedalam needed more inventive storytelling, and seems too forced, too easy, too mawkish". Anupama Subramanian of Deccan Chronicle gave the film 2 out of 5 stars and stated, "This Ajith starrer largely depends on the mass appeal and star power of the actor with a script sans solid content and logic and just tailor-made by for him. Though the story travels in predictable lines, it has high-octane stunt sequences, bro-sis sentiment, and loads of punch lines, hit songs to satisfy the mass audiences." Latha Srinivasan of Daily News and Analysis stated, "Director Siruthai Siva has ensured that there is plenty for Ajith fans and the family audience. Ajith has punch dialogues, high octane action sequences and all the right dance moves. He plays the good and the bad with ease and is a treat to watch on screen. The sister sentiment (the story revolves around Tamizh) and the fact that men need to respect women is a major highlight in the film. The storyline may not be new for Tamil cinema, but the director has tailor-made it for Ajith and the mass audience." A critic from Kalki concluded that the film is an old rhythm played on a new drum.

=== Box office ===
Vedalam opened across 750 screens worldwide, with 500 screens belongs to Tamil Nadu, and set a highest opening of ₹15.3 crore (US$1.6 million). On the second day, the film had collected ₹12 crore (US$1.3 million). Within 11 days of its release, the film had collected ₹103 crore worldwide. On 18 November 2015, trade analyst Ramesh Bala stated that the film had earned a major revenue of 60% from Tamil Nadu, with 12% from Karnataka, Kerala and rest of India, 10% from Malaysia, and 18% from rest of the overseas. At the Chennai box office, the film's performance had been affected due to the 2015 South India floods.

== Remakes ==
Shortly after the film's success, Rathnam wanted to remake the film in Kannada and Telugu, with Puneeth Rajkumar and Darshan reprising Kumar's role in the former, while the latter had Pawan Kalyan playing the lead role. Although the Kannada version never finished, the Telugu version had Chiranjeevi playing the lead, replacing Kalyan, and was reported to be directed by Meher Ramesh under the title Bhola Shankar. In September 2019, T-Series acquired the Hindi remake rights.

== In popular culture ==
Ajith Kumar's transformation and the following fight scene in Vedalam were parodied in Tamizh Padam 2 (2018).
