= Fish Venkat =

Indian actor (1971–2025)

- Born: Mangalampalli Vankatesh; 3 August 1971; Hyderabad, Telangana, India
- Died: 18 July 2025 (aged 53); Hyderabad, Telangana, India
- Occupation: Actor
- Years active: 2000–2025

Mangalampalli Venkatesh (3 August 1971 – 18 July 2025), popularly known as Fish Venkat, was an Indian actor and comedian renowned for his distinctive Telangana accent and vibrant screen presence in Telugu cinema. With a career spanning over two decades, he was best known for portraying comic and villainous roles, leaving a lasting impression through his unique dialogue delivery and timing.

== Life and career ==
Venkat was born in Hyderabad, Andhra Pradesh, India. He strongly used a Telangana dialect that is reminiscent of fishermen, thus earning him the name "Fish" Venkat.

Fish Venkat died on 18 July 2025 at the age of 53 in Hyderabad, Telangana, due to complications arising from kidney and liver failure.

He had been undergoing dialysis for several months and was placed on ventilator support during his final days. His daughter, Shravanthi, had publicly appealed for financial assistance, stating that ₹50 lakh was urgently required for a liver and kidney transplant. Despite partial support from the Telugu film industry, a suitable donor could not be found in time.

His death led to an outpouring of grief from fans and film personalities alike.

== Filmography ==
Year	Title	Role	Notes
2000	Sri Srimati Satyabhama	Narasimham's henchman	
2001	Kushi	Gudumba Satti's henchman	
2002	Aadi		
2002	Chennakesava Reddy	Venkat	
2003	Dil	Gowri's henchman	
2003	Seetayya	Goon	
2005	Bunny	Somaraju's henchman	
2005	Bhageeratha		
2006	Madrasi	Ravi Bhai's henchman	Tamil film
2006	Ashok	KK's henchman	
2006	Samanyudu	Venkat	
2006	Asadhyudu	Prakash's henchman	
2007	Dhee	Shankar's henchmen	
2007	Yogi	Yogi's henchman	
2007	Dubai Seenu	Jinnah Bhai's henchman	
2008	Krishna	Sattulu, Jakka's henchman	
2008	Kalidasu		
2008	Bujjigadu	Machi Reddy's henchman	Uncredited role
2008	Ready		
2008	Adivishnu		
2008	Souryam	Sivarama Goud's henchman	
2008	Hero		
2008	Dongala Bandi		
2008	King	Gnaneshwar's henchman	
2009	Malli Malli		
2009	Anjaneyulu	Bada's henchman	
2009	Sankham	Pasupati's henchman	
2009	Ganesh	Mahadev's henchman	
2010	Adhurs	Venkat	
2010	Seetharamula Kalyanam Lankalo		
2010	Varudu	Diwakar's assistant	
2010	Pappu		
2010	Don Seenu	Machi Raju's henchman	
2011	Mirapakaay		
2011	Siruthai	Bavuji's henchman	Tamil film
2011	Veera	Dhanraj's henchman	
2011	Kandireega	Chintu	
2011	Veedu Theda		
2011	Solo		
2012	Rachcha	Venkat	
2012	Gabbar Singh	Siddhappa Naidu's henchmen	
2012	Daruvu	Babu's henchman	
2012	Tuneega Tuneega		Special appearance
2012	Devudu Chesina Manushulu	Fish Venkat	
2012	Sudigadu	Venkat	
2013	Naayak	Babji's henchmen	
2013	Jai Sriram		
2013	Race		
2013	Balupu	Poorna's henchmen	
2013	Adda		
2013	Attarintiki Daredi	Siddhappa Naidu's henchman	
2013	Bhai	Bhai's henchmen	
2014	Eduru Leni Alexander	Kotappa's henchman	
2014	Jump Jilani	Basava	
2014	Oka Laila Kosam	Goon	
2014	Chakkiligintha	Adi's classmate's father	
2015	Superstar Kidnap		
2015	Bham Bolenath		
2015	James Bond	Simhachalam	
2015	Subramanyam for Sale	Govind's henchman	
2015	Shivam	Fish	
2015	Sher	Pappi's henchman	
2015	Mosagallaku Mosagadu	Kaushik's henchman	
2015	Mirchi Lanti Kurradu		
2016	Eedo Rakam Aado Rakam	Henchman	
2016	Babu Bangaram	Puchappa's henchman	
2016	Thikka	Sadhu Bhai's henchman	
2016	Speedunnodu	Ramachandrappa's henchmen	
2016	Hyper	Rajappa's henchmen	
2016	Ekkadiki Pothavu Chinnavada		
2017	Inkenti Nuvve Cheppu		
2017	Khaidi No. 150	Borabandi Bujji's gang member	
2017	Luckunnodu	JK's henchman	
2017	Kittu Unnadu Jagratha	Rechukka's henchman	
2017	Radha	MLA Sujatha's henchman	
2017	Juliet Lover of Idiot		
2018	Agnyaathavaasi		
2018	Inttelligent	Yadav's henchman	
2018	Touch Chesi Chudu		
2018	Gayatri	Gayatri Patel's goon	
2018	Nela Ticket	Auto Driver	
2018	Husharu	Laddanna	
2019	1st Rank Raju	Goon	
2019	Gaddalakonda Ganesh	Kanberi	
2020	Bombhaat	Dada's henchman	
2020	Guvva Gorinka	Sadanand's father	
2020	Maa Vintha Gaadha Vinuma	Himself	
2022	DJ Tillu	Head constable	
2022	Suraapanam		
2022	S5 No Exit		
2023	Lingoccha		
2023	Slum Dog Husband		
2023	Narakasura	Constable Venkat	
2023	Naa Nee Prema Katha		
2025	Coffee with a Killer		
2025	Paanch Minar	Chotu’s right-hand man	Posthumous release
2026	Seetha Payanam		Posthumous release
