= Viswasam =

2019 film directed by Siva

- Theatrical release poster
- Directed by: Siva
- Story by: Siva; Aadhi Narayana
- Dialogues by: Siva; K. Manikandan; Ra. Savarimuthu; Antony Bakyaraj; Chandran Pachaimuthu
- Produced by: T. G. Thyagarajan (presenter); Sendhil Thyagarajan; Arjun Thyagarajan
- Starring: Ajith Kumar; Nayanthara; Jagapathi Babu
- Cinematography: Vetri Palanisamy
- Edited by: Ruben
- Music by: D. Imman
- Production company: Sathya Jyothi Films
- Distributed by: KJR Studios; Raja Mannar Films; Sakthi Film Factory
- Release date: 10 January 2019 (India)
- Running time: 156 minutes
- Country: India
- Language: Tamil
- Budget: ₹100 crore
- Box office: est. ₹185–200 crore

Viswasam (transl. Loyalty) is a 2019 Indian Tamil-language action comedy film directed by Siva and produced by Sathya Jyothi Films. The film stars Ajith Kumar, Nayanthara and Jagapathi Babu in the lead roles, alongside Vivek, Thambi Ramaiah, Robo Shankar, Kovai Sarala, Yogi Babu, Anikha Surendran, Kalairani, Sujatha Sivakumar, Rajitha and R. N. R. Manohar. It was the final collaboration between Ajith with Siva out of three films. The film follows Thookudurai, a village ruffian, who goes to take on Gautham Veer after trying to patch his marriage with Niranjana.

The film was officially announced in November 2017 under the tentative title Thala 58, as it is Ajith's 58th film as leading actor, and the official title was announced a few days later. Principal photography commenced in May 2018. It was predominantly shot in Chennai and Hyderabad before wrapping by mid-November 2018. The film has music composed by D. Imman, cinematography handled by Vetri Palanisamy and editing by Ruben.

Viswasam was released worldwide on 10 January 2019 in theatres to mixed reviews from critics. Imman won Best Music Director at the 67th National Film Awards. The film was a commercial success, grossing around ₹185-200 crore, emerging the third highest grossing Tamil film of 2019.

== Plot ==
In addition to being a businessman, the story's hero protagonist Thookudurai is a well-respected chieftain of his village Koduvilarpatti in Theni. After ten years, a festival is set to occur at the village's temple. Thookudurai's family and friends have been longing to see Thookudurai's wife and daughter. After much deliberation, Thookudurai decides to travel to Mumbai to meet them. During the journey, Thookudurai's uncles, Merit and Rosamani, are upset over Thookudurai's current life and reminisce about his life.

Past: Thookudurai used to be a happy-go-lucky man and an owner of a rice mill in his village & used violent ways to deal with problems. While chasing a few goons, he stumbled across a doctor named Niranjana, who witnesses his actions, lodges a case against him. When he saw Niranjana, he immediately falls for her and he surrenders to the police. Later, Niranjana was forced to release Thookudurai after Aavudaiyappan threatens to close her medical camp unless she pays him. After fighting the goons, Thooku Durai relocates Niranjana's camp to his rice mill. Niranjana realizes her love for Thooku Durai and she proposes to him, which he accepts after some consideration. Thookudurai and Niranjana marry and lead a happy life, but Niranjana is disturbed by Thookudurai's involvement in feuds. Soon, Niranjana gets pregnant and is accepted to one of the most exceptional pharmaceutical programs, which she refuses for Thookudurai.

After their daughter, Swetha, is born, Niranjana leaves out of town, after getting a promise from Thookudurai not to bring Swetha to any fights. On the way to pick up Niranjana from Railway Station, Aavudaiyappan, picks up a fight with Thookudurai. Thookudurai finds Niranjana at home, and Swetha passes out due to the fight. After rushing to the emergency ward, Swetha survives but Niranjana gets infuriated at Thookudurai and tells him to stay away from her and her daughter. Niranjana and Swetha leave the village to the city.

Present: Thookudurai tries to meet up with Niranjana at her company Niranjana Pharmaceuticals Pvt Ltd at Mumbai, but to no avail. Thookudurai later sees his daughter Swetha, who is in contention for the Junior National title. Swetha travels home when attempts are made to kill her. Thookudurai arrives in the nick of time to save her. It is then revealed that the well-known entrepreneur Gautham Veer is behind this. Gautham Veer is the owner of Skyline Exports and owns a range of multinational companies. Gautham Veer expects the same of his daughter Neha, who is slower than Swetha by milliseconds. After Gautham Veer threatens Neha that she will find no affection in him if she loses, she resorts to doping, which helps her win the race. Unfortunately, Swetha finds out, who reports it to the authorities. Fearing that her father's reputation and affection would completely vanish, Neha attempts suicide but becomes paralyzed in the process.

Gautham Veer is distraught at seeing his daughter Neha's condition and vows to have Swetha killed at any cost. After saving her, Thookudurai requests Niranjana to appoint him as Swetha's driver for the next ten days, until her competition, to which she reluctantly agrees on the condition that he does not reveal him as her father. Thookudurai enjoys being in the company of Swetha while saving her from goons on multiple occasions. Thookudurai later meets Gautham Veer and he challenges him. Unfortunately, Thookudurai is run over by a car before Swetha's competition and Thookudurai is in critical condition. Niranjana and Swetha are forced to leave for America, and Thookudurai recovers. Swetha also brings Gautham Veer's wife and Gautham Veer's daughter. Before the competition, Gautham Veer fights an already injured Thookudurai, at this point Niranjana reveals to Swetha that Thookudurai is Swetha's father. Swetha lags during the race as she has no encouragement.

Thookudurai fights Gautham Veer back, and Durai reaches the track, and he encourages his daughter by whistling. Swetha wins the race. At the same time, Gautham Veer arrives on the road to attack Thookudurai, but after Gautham Veer sees his daughter's recovery, he realizes his mistake. Thookudurai tells Gautham Veer that children should grow up as they desire and not burden them with what their parents' want. Swetha is announced as the winner, along with Thookudurai's name added to Swetha's name by Niranjana, and they reunite with Thookudurai.

== Cast ==
- Ajith Kumar as Thookudurai
- Nayanthara as Niranjana, Thookudurai's wife
- Jagapathi Babu as Gautham Veer, Thooku Durai's rival
- Vivek as Kesavan
- Thambi Ramaiah as Rosamani
- Robo Shankar as Merit
- Kovai Sarala as Philomeena
- Yogi Babu as Velu
- Anikha Surendran as Swetha Thookudurai, Thookudurai's and Niranjana's daughter
- Saloni Umesh Burde as Neha
- Kalairani as Pechiammal, Thookudurai's aunt
- Sujatha Sivakumar as Thookudurai's aunt
- Rajitha as Thookudurai's aunt
- R. N. R. Manohar as Thookudurai's uncle
- Cheeniamma as Thookudurai's grandmother
- Jangiri Madhumitha as Thookudurai's cousin
- Ramesh Thilak as Thookudurai's friend
- Namo Narayana as Thookudurai's friend
- Bharath Reddy as Swetha's coach
- Surekha Vani as Gautham's wife
- Ravi Prakash as Gautham's personal assistant
- Mime Gopi as Aavudaiyappan
- O. A. K. Sundar as Kozhimuthu, Thookudurai's rival
- Narayan Lucky as Niranjana's colleague/manager
- Papri Ghosh as Priya, Niranjana's colleague
- Sakshi Agarwal as Niranjana's colleague
- T. M. Karthik as Niranjana's colleague
- Sharmila Thapa as Niranjana's colleague
- George Maryan as a police inspector
- Ramachandran Durairaj as a police constable
- Hello Kandasamy as a police constable
- Mathew Varghese as a district collector
- Chatrapathi Sekhar as Khadar, Thookudurai's friend
- Sampath Ram as Kozhimuthu's aid
- Meesai Ramesh as a villager
- Ravi Awana as D'Souza, a wrestler
- Temper Vamsi as a corporate official
- Sai Siddharth as a friend of Thookudurai

== Production ==
=== Development ===
The collaboration between Sathya Jyothi Films, director Siva, and actor Ajith Kumar was announced via the studio's official Twitter handle in late November 2017, after months of speculation on Ajith Kumar's next project. Nayanthara was announced as the lead actress in early February 2018. D. Imman was signed on to work as the film's music composer, which marked his first collaboration with Ajith Kumar and Siva. This would be Yogi Babu's 100th film as an actor.

=== Filming ===
Principal photography was supposed to begin on 23 March 2018 but was pushed back significantly to the Tamil Film Producers Council's strike. It eventually began on 7 May at Hyderabad, and wrapped in November 2018 and released for Pongal 2019. The crew also filmed in Chennai and Mumbai.

== Music ==
The soundtrack album is composed by D. Imman, making his first collaboration with Ajith Kumar and Siva. The background music was reused by Imman himself for the Bollywood film Marjaavaan (also 2019), directed by Milap Milan Zaveri and starring Sidharth Malhotra, Tara Sutaria and Riteish Deshmukh in lead roles.

== Release ==
=== Theatrical ===
Viswasam was released on 10 January 2019, coinciding with the occasion of Thai Pongal festival along with Rajinikanth starrer Petta.

=== Home media ===
The film was released on digital platform Amazon Prime Video on 25 February 2019. The satellite rights were sold to Sun Network.

== Reception ==
=== Box office ===
The film collected more than ₹15 crore (US$2.34 million) in Tamil Nadu, ₹2 crore (US$311,760.06) in Kerala, more than ₹1.5 crore (US$233,820.04) in Karnataka, ₹1 crore (US$155,880.03) in Rest of India, more than ₹7 crore (US$1.09 million) in Overseas and with a total of ₹25.4 crore (US$3.96 million) in first day. The film collected ₹33.50 crore (US$5.22 million) in India in 2 days. The film collected ₹180 crore (US$28.06 million) worldwide in 3 weeks.

=== Critical response ===
The film received mixed reviews praising the performances (particularly Ajith Kumar and Jagapathi Babu), action sequences, soundtrack, film's score and emotional quotient but criticism for the direction, screenplay, and predictable plot. On the review aggregator website Rotten Tomatoes, 60% of 5 critics' reviews are positive, with an average rating of 5/10.

The Times of India rated 3/5, stating, "The film follows the regular template in its narration and changes track at a point keeping in mind to reach all sections of audience. The plot also becomes predictable once the real story unfolds. But the lack of evident flaws make it a one time watch entertainer". Firstpost rated 3/5 stating "Viswasam has several moments worth paying a visit to the theatre. The bang for buck interval fight sequence in the rain is one of the highlights of the film. As a pair, Ajith and Siva make a strong comeback with the film, which has its issues but makes for quite an entertaining watch anyway". Sify rated 3/5 stating "Ajith is endearing and is in tremendous form that the actor looks super energetic as Thooku Durai. Viswasam is a pucca family entertainer for this Pongal festival. Go and enjoy with your family!".

India Today rated 2.5 out of 5 stars stating "After churning out an underwhelming spy thriller Vivegam, Ajith and director Siruthai Siva go back to the rural route with Viswasam. But the film does not do justice to expectations and is impressive only in parts, says our review". The News Minute rated 2 out of 5 stars stating "After touring Eastern Europe in 'Vivegam', Siva brings Ajith back to Tamil Nadu and it proves to be a wise move". The Hindu stated "The problem with the film is that it offers very little for Ajith, the star". Hindustan Times rated 1.5 out of 5 stars stating "While the idea would have been to make audience feel the moment of sweet victory, all it does is ruin the palette for those who enjoy a good commercial film". Deccan Chronicle stated "Though there’s nothing new by way of story, Siva has made a movie that is all about a mass star – Thala Ajith". Cinema Express rated 2.5 out of 5 stars stating "Director Siva's biggest achievement is giving us an Ajith who is having fun on screen after a long time, apart from which the film mainly works on surprise value".

=== Accolades ===
Award (Note: Awards, festivals and organizations are in alphabetical order.)	Date of ceremony (Note: Date is linked to the article about the awards held that year, wherever possible.)	Category	Recipient(s)	Result	Ref.
Edison Awards	12 January 2020	Mass Hero Of The Year	Ajith Kumar	Nominated	
Edison Awards	12 January 2020	Best Film	Viswasam	Nominated	
Edison Awards	12 January 2020	Favourite Actress	Nayanthara	Nominated	
Edison Awards	12 January 2020	Best Music Director	D. Imman	Nominated	
Edison Awards	12 January 2020	Best Playback Singer – Male	Sid Sriram ("Kannaana Kanney")	Nominated	
Edison Awards	12 January 2020	Best Child Artist	Anikha	Nominated	
Edison Awards	12 January 2020	Best Movie Poster	Anil & Bhanu	Nominated	
National Film Awards	25 October 2021	Best Music Director	D. Imman	Won	
Norway Tamil Film Festival Awards	15 January 2020	Best Music Director	D. Imman	Won	
Norway Tamil Film Festival Awards	15 January 2020	Best Playback Singer Male	Sid Sriram ("Kannaana Kanney")	Won	
Norway Tamil Film Festival Awards	15 January 2020	Best Lyricist	Thamarai ("Kannaana Kanney")	Won	
South Indian International Movie Awards	18–19 September 2021	Best Film – Tamil	Sathya Jyothi Films	Nominated	
South Indian International Movie Awards	18–19 September 2021	Best Actor – Tamil	Ajith Kumar	Nominated	
South Indian International Movie Awards	18–19 September 2021	Best Actor in a Negative Role – Tamil	Jagapathi Babu	Nominated	
South Indian International Movie Awards	18–19 September 2021	Best Lyricist – Tamil	Thamarai – (for "Kannaana Kanney")	Nominated	
South Indian International Movie Awards	18–19 September 2021	Best Actress – Tamil	Nayanthara	Won	
South Indian International Movie Awards	18–19 September 2021	Best Music Director – Tamil	D. Imman	Won	
Zee Cine Awards Tamil	4 January 2020	Favourite Film of The Year	Viswasam	Won	
Zee Cine Awards Tamil	4 January 2020	Favourite Heroine	Nayanthara	Won	
Zee Cine Awards Tamil	4 January 2020	Favourite Music Director	D. Imman	Won	
Zee Cine Awards Tamil	4 January 2020	Favourite Song	"Kannaana Kanney"	Won	
Zee Cine Awards Tamil	4 January 2020	Best Playback Singer – Male	Sid Sriram ("Kannaana Kanney")	Won	
Zee Cine Awards Tamil	4 January 2020	Best Lyricist	Thamarai ("Kannaana Kanney")	Won	
