= M. Shanmugham =

Indian politician

M. Shanmugham was elected to the Tamil Nadu Legislative Assembly from the Kinathukadavu constituency in the 1996 elections. He was a candidate of the Dravida Munnetra Kazhagam (DMK) party.
