= Sankham =

Shankham
- Poster
- Directed by: Siva
- Screenplay by: Siva
- Dialogues by: Anil Ravipudi
- Story by: Siva
- Produced by: J. Bhagavan; J. Pulla Rao
- Starring: Gopichand; Trisha
- Cinematography: Vetri
- Edited by: Gautham Raju
- Music by: S. Thaman
- Production company: Sri Balaji Cine Media
- Release date: 11 September 2009
- Running time: 155 minutes
- Country: India
- Language: Telugu
- Box office: ₹20 crore

Shankham (transl. Conch) is a 2009 Indian Telugu-language action comedy film produced by J Bhagavan, J Pulla Rao under Sri Balaji Cine Media banner and written and directed by Siva. The film stars Gopichand and Trisha, while Sathyaraj, Chandra Mohan, Kota Srinivasa Rao, and Ali play supporting roles. The music was composed by S. Thaman with cinematography by Vetri and editing by Gautham Raju.

The film follows Chandu, an NRI living in Australia with his uncle and friend. When his girlfriend Mahalakshmi is forcefully taken to India by her violent family members, he arrives in India to marry her but is assigned a task that would eventually pull him into an ages-old feud with the rival village and lead him to the discovery of his true identity.

The film was released theatrically on 11 September 2009. The film was also dubbed and released in Hindi as Phir Ek Most Wanted, in Bhojpuri as Baghi Balma and in Tamil as Sivappu Saamy.

== Plot ==
Chandu (Gopichand) is a rich, rough youth brought up by his uncle Krishna Rao (Chandra Mohan) in Australia. Mahalakshmi (Trisha) stays in Australia with her uncle Pichaiah (Dharmavarapu Subrahmanyam), who runs a restaurant. Chandu is fond of martial arts, but he never gets a chance to exhibit them in real situations. Mahalakshmi is another martial arts freak. After a few misunderstandings, they fall in love. One day, Mahalakshmi is forced to come back to her hometown in Rayalaseema. Chandu comes in search of her.

Meanwhile, Sivaiah (Sathyaraj) and his archenemy, Mahalakshmi's father Pashupati (Kota Srinivasa Rao) are the rich leaders of two neighboring villages in Rayalaseema. They have a longstanding enmity. Chandu comes to Mahalakshmi's village and asks for her hand in marriage. Though Pashupati's sister opposes this, Pashupati agrees based on one condition: that Chandu must escort his brother from the railway station to home safely. The brother, Rajappa (Supreeth), has been on a 25-year self-imposed exile from the district because his life was under threat from Sivaiah and his entire village. Chandu agrees and does so, beating 30 of Sivaiah's men on the way. Then Chandu is challenged to go to Sivaiah's house. While walking to Sivaiah's house, he is beaten up badly by Sivaiah's men that he lay at the door of the house. When Sivaiah sees Chandu's face, he recognizes him and rushes him to the hospital, where he is saved. The incident reaches Krishna Rao, who flies to India. Krishna Rao is shocked to see Chandu with Sivaiah and tells Chandu about his parents. Sivaiah is actually Chandu's father and reveals his past.

Past: 23 years ago, there was a big feud between villages over sharing water, in which a multitude of lives were lost in clashes. Sivaiah's wife pleads with him to stop the fight, to which he pays no heed. She gives birth to twins, but one child and her parents are killed in a car bomb blast before her very eyes. This makes her take Chandu and go to her native. After two years, she has a change of heart and comes to meet Sivaiah. As they are about to reconcile, Rajappa ambushes Sivaiah and kills his wife before his eyes, despite his pleas. He sent Chandu with Krishna Rao and has paid for all of his expenses since then.

Present: Chandu then joins Sivaiah as his heir, and the rest of the story is how he defeats both Pashupati and his brothers. However, Pashupati and Rajappa hatch a plan and kill Sivayya. Just before he dies, Sivayya requests Chandu to take over his legacy, and Chandu accepts. In retaliation, Sivayya's henchmen go to kill Pashupati's henchmen. Chandu enters the factory and fights and kills Rajappa, thus avenging his family's death. He then leaves Pashupati to be lynched by the villagers and leaves the factory. In the end, Chandu reunites with Mahalakshmi.

== Cast ==
- Gopichand as Chandu
- Trisha as Mahalakshmi Naidu
- Sathyaraj as T. Sivayya, Chandu's father
- Chandra Mohan as Krishna Rao "Kittu", Chandu's uncle
- Kota Srinivasa Rao as Simha Pashupathi Naidu, Mahalakshmi's father
- Ali as Saif Ali Khan
- Swathi as Katrina
- Seetha as Parvathi, Sivaiah's wife and Chandu's mother
- Dharmavarapu Subramanyam as Pichaiah, Mahalakshmi's uncle
- Supreeth as Simha Gajapati Naidu, Pashupati's brother
- Krishna Bhagavaan as Pashupathi's lawyer
- Raghu Babu as Doctor
- Telangana Shakuntala as Pashupathi's sister and Prem Kumar's mother
- Rajitha as Pichaiah's wife
- L. B. Sriram as Villager
- Venu Madhav as Prem Kumar
- Banerjee as Suri
- Prudhvi Raj as Pashupathi's brother-in-law (in portrait)
- Srinivasa Reddy as Seenu
- Raghunatha Reddy as M.P.
- Melkote as Feroz Khan
- Fish Venkat as Pashupati's henchmen
- Apoorva
- Devisri
- Ramya Chowdary
- Aruna
- Priya
- Usha Rani

== Soundtrack ==
Shankham

Soundtrack album by S. Thaman
- Released: 19 August 2009
- Recorded: 2009
- Genre: Soundtrack
- Length: 24:01
- Label: Aditya Music
- Producer: S. Thaman

S. Thaman chronology
Eeram (2009)	Shankham (2009)	Jayeebhava (2009)

Music composed by S. Thaman. Music released on Aditya Music Company.

No.	Title	Lyrics	Singer(s)	Length
1.	"Mahalakshmi"	Ramajogayya Sastry	Karthik, Haricharan, Ranjith, Megha, Janani, Priya Himesh, Divya, Geetha Madhuri, Rita	4:30
2.	"Dhakku Dhakku"	Bhaskarabatla	KK, Rahul Nambiar, Priya, Megha, Priyadarshini	4:15
3.	"Maamu"	Ramajogayya Sastry	Udit Narayan, Manikka Vinayagam	4:18
4.	"Dheeradhi"	Acharya Srishesham	Pushpavanam Kuppuswamy, Ranjith	4:51
5.	"Ie Baboi"	Bhaskarabatla	Ranjith, Naveen, Priya Darshini	3:56
6.	"Shankham"	Acharya Srishesham	Karthik, Ranjith, Naveen, Rahul Nambiar, Sathyan, Vasu	1:52
Total length:				24:01

== Reception ==
Shankham received mixed reviews from critics. Jeevi of Idlebrain rated it two out of five, calling it "a clichéd film". A critic from Rediff.com wrote that "On the whole, Siva churns out a mass movie which may fare well in the B and C centres. It can be watched for Gopichand if you can bear the tedium of time and action and a cliched storyline".
