= Siva (director) =

Indian film director and screenwriter (born 1977)

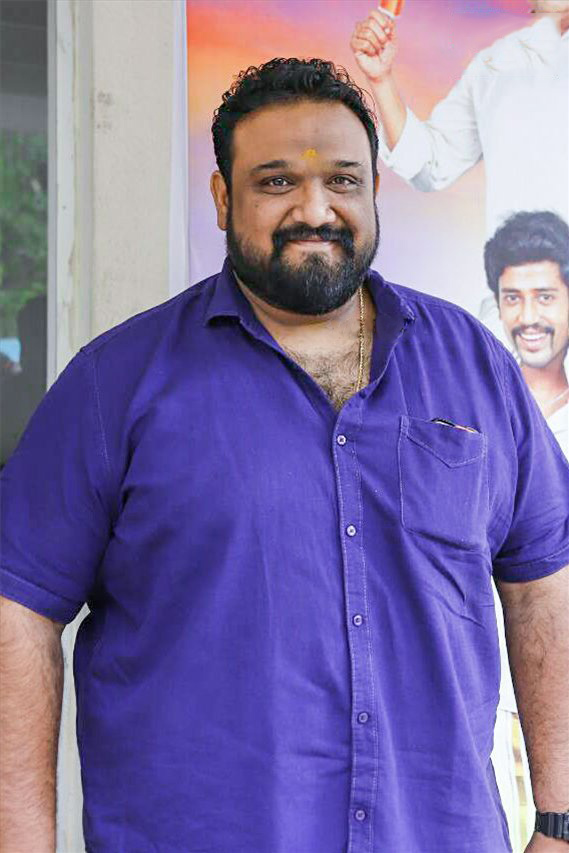
- Siva in 2018
- Born: Sivakumar Jayakumar; 12 August 1977 (age 49); Madras (present-day Chennai), Tamil Nadu, India
- Other name: Siruthai Siva
- Occupations: Cinematographer; Film director; Screenwriter; Lyricist
- Years active: 2001–present
- Relatives: Bala (brother)

Sivakumar Jayakumar (born 12 August 1977), known professionally by his mononym Siva or Siruthai Siva, is an Indian film director, screenwriter, cinematographer, and lyricist who works in Tamil and Telugu films.

Siva began his film career as a cinematographer, working in several Telugu, Tamil, and Malayalam films. He later transitioned to directing and screenwriting in Telugu cinema, making his directorial debut with Souryam (2008), a commercial success. He followed it with Sankham (2009), and Daruvu (2012).

Siva then moved to Tamil cinema, where he made his directorial debut with Siruthai (2011). He achieved significant success with high-profile films such as Veeram (2014), Vedalam (2015), and Viswasam (2019).

== Early life and family ==
Siva was born to documentary film director M. Jayakumar in Chennai, Tamil Nadu, India. He is the grandson of producer and writer A. K. Velan. His brother Bala is an actor in Tamil and Malayalam films.

== Career ==
Although he always wanted to become a filmmaker, he pursued photography. In 1998, Siva became a gold medalist from M.G.R. Government Film and Television Training Institute He went on to work with cinematographer Jayanan Vincent. Siva then came to Hyderabad to work for Venkatesh's film Jayam Manade Raa (2000) as an operative cameraman. In 2001, he became an independent cinematographer. He has shot for about 10 films since then.

In 2008, he narrated a script to actor Gopichand who agreed to play the lead role. Souryam, co-starring Gopichand along with Anushka Shetty was Siva's directorial debut. The following year, Siva made his second film, again with Gopichand in the lead. In 2011, Siva made his debut as a director in Tamil cinema with Siruthai, a remake of S. S. Rajamouli's Telugu action masala Vikramarkudu. The film, featuring Karthi in the starring role, went on to become a commercial success, which led to him being referred to as "Siruthai" Siva in Tamil cinema from then on. His fourth directorial, Daruvu, released in 2012.

In 2011, Siva was signed by Vijaya Productions to direct a film for their centenary year with Ajith Kumar signed on to play the leading role. Ajith Kumar requested Siva to make it as a rural story and production began in 2013. He directed Veeram (2014) with Ajith Kumar Playing the lead role, which became a blockbuster hit. His third film in Tamil titled Vedhalam (2015) starring Ajith alongside an ensemble cast including Shruti Hassan and Rahul Dev movie was a mass entertainer. His fourth film in Tamil titled Vivegam (2017) was again with Ajith Kumar. It released in August 2017 to mixed responses. His next movie with Ajith Kumar, Viswasam (2019), which was produced by Sathya Jyothi Films, became a huge hit despite releasing along with Petta. His next film Annaatthe starring Rajinikanth released on 4 November 2021 coinciding with Diwali.

== Filmography ==
=== As cinematographer ===
- Note: he was credited as J. Sivakumar.

| Year | Film | Language |
|---|---|---|
| 2001 | Ee Nadu Innale Vare | Malayalam |
| 2002 | Charlie Chaplin | Tamil |
| 2002 | Sreeram | Telugu |
| 2003 | Manasellam | Tamil |
| 2004 | Nenunnanu | Telugu |
| 2005 | Manasu Maata Vinadhu | Telugu |
| 2005 | Gowtam SSC | Telugu |
| 2006 | Boss | Telugu |

=== As director and screenwriter ===
| Year | Film | Language |
|---|---|---|
| 2008 | Souryam | Telugu |
| 2009 | Sankham | Telugu |
| 2011 | Siruthai | Tamil |
| 2012 | Daruvu | Telugu |
| 2014 | Veeram | Tamil |
| 2015 | Vedalam | Tamil |
| 2017 | Vivegam | Tamil |
| 2019 | Viswasam | Tamil |
| 2021 | Annaatthe | Tamil |
| 2024 | Kanguva | Tamil |

=== As lyricist ===
| Year | Film | Songs |
|---|---|---|
| 2015 | Vedalam | "Theri Theme" |
| 2017 | Vivegam | "Surviva", "Thalai Viduthalai", "Veriyera" |
| 2019 | Viswasam | "Rise Up Theme" |

=== As actor ===
- Manadhai Thirudivittai (2001)
- Sandhitha Velai (2000)

=== Frequent collaborators ===
| Collaborator | Souryam; (2008) | Sankham; (2009) | Siruthai; (2011) | Daruvu; (2012) | Veeram; (2014) | Vedalam; (2015) | Vivegam; (2017) | Viswasam; (2019) | Annaatthe; (2021) | Kanguva; (2024) |
|---|---|---|---|---|---|---|---|---|---|---|
| Ajith Kumar | | | | | Yes | Yes | Yes | Yes | | |
| Yogi Babu | | | | | Yes | Yes | | Yes | | Yes |
| Avinash Yelandur | | | Yes | Yes | Yes | Yes | | | | |
| Thambi Ramaiah | | | | | Yes | Yes | | Yes | | |
| Kovai Sarala | | | | | | Yes | | Yes | | Yes |
| Kalairani | | | | | Yes | Yes | | Yes | | Yes |
| R. N. R. Manohar | | | | | Yes | Yes | | Yes | | |
| Mayilsamy | | | Yes | | Yes | Yes | | | | |
| Amit Tiwari | | | Yes | | | Yes | Yes | | | |
| Aniket Chouhan | | | | | | Yes | | | Yes | Yes |
| Billy Murali | | | | | | Yes | Yes | | Yes | |
| Sreeja Ravi | | | | | Yes | Yes | | | Yes | |
| Rajitha | | Yes | | | | | | Yes | Yes | |
| Dharmavarapu Subramanyam | Yes | Yes | | Yes | | | | | | |
| Raghu Babu | Yes | Yes | | Yes | | | | | | |
| Banerjee | Yes | Yes | | | | | | | Yes | |
| Fish Venkat | Yes | Yes | Yes | Yes | | | | | | |
| Vetri | Yes | Yes | | Yes | Yes | Yes | Yes | Yes | Yes | Yes |
| Ruben | | | | | | Yes | Yes | Yes | Yes | |
| Aadhi Narayana | | | | Yes | | Yes | Yes | Yes | Yes | Yes |
