= Souryam =

2008 Telugu film by Siva

- Movie Poster
- Directed by: Siva
- Screenplay by: Siva
- Dialogues by: M. Rathnam
- Story by: Siva
- Produced by: V. Anand Prasad
- Starring: Gopichand; Anushka; Poonam Kaur
- Cinematography: Vetri Palanisamy
- Edited by: Marthand K. Venkatesh
- Music by: Mani Sharma
- Production company: Bhavya Creations
- Release date: 25 September 2008
- Running time: 159 minutes
- Country: India
- Language: Telugu
- Box office: ₹10 crore distributors' share

Souryam (transl. Bravery) is a 2008 Indian Telugu-language action drama film directed by Siva in his directorial debut. Produced by V. Anand Prasad under the Bhavya Creations banner, the film stars Gopichand, Anushka, Poonam Kaur, and Manoj K. Jayan. The music was composed by Mani Sharma. Vetri handled the cinematography and Marthand K. Venkatesh edited the film.

The film was released on 25 September 2008 and was a commercial success. It was remade in Bangladesh Bengali as Mone Boro Koshto (2009), Kannada as Shourya (2010), and in Tamil as Vedi (2011). The film was later dubbed and released in Malayalam and Hindi as Shouryam and Meri Shapath respectively.

== Plot ==
The film starts with Vijay (Gopichand) being chased by some goons in Orissa on his way to Kolkata, whom he scares off. The goons were sent by Sivarama Goud (Manoj K. Jayan), a gangster in Hyderabad who is under trial. Sivarama's son Ajay (Ajay) swears to avenge his father's insult and arrest. Vijay approaches a college in Kolkata to apply for a job in the sports quota. He meets a bubbly college girl, Swetha (Anushka Shetty) and after some hilarious events, they eventually fall in love.

One night at a party, Ajay finds and meets Swetha and asks if she wants to sleep with him and cuts her blouse down. Swetha was disrespected and embarrassed, and then later, Ajay follows her and Divya (Poonam Kaur) and corners the girls with his men. After his father sent him a picture of the person he needs to abduct, Ajay found out that Divya is the key and abducts her by force. Divya was able to escape from the goons, and then she finds a man who comes to rescue her, who is apparently Vijay, and fights them in vain and also kills Ajay. Its aftermath resulted in an injured Divya, as she was taken by Vijay to the hospital.

At the hospital, Vijay revealed to Swetha that he was looking for Divya, his long-lost separated sister who hated him for ignoring her when they were kids. But unbeknownst to Divya, he was forced to ignore her sister because of his dream for her to have a better life than to live in the streets with him. He hides his identity from her and grows up with the influence of a police officer until he is ready to find her in the present day to meet her. But when gangsters chase Swetha and Vijay at the hospital, Vijay is forced to fight and kill some of Ajay's goons in front of Swetha, which makes her scared of him because of the way he fights ruthlessly and grimly. Vijay reveals his past life as a police officer to Swetha.

Six months ago in Hyderabad, the police officer who raised Vijay was made to die by Sivarama. Sivarama was a ruthless mastermind who also terrorised an innocent village. Vijay was the newly appointed ACP there. He created a clever plan to make Sivarama and his men eventually be punished for all of their crimes. However, during his leave, Vijay gets a call from Sivarama saying that he found out about Divya and has sent his men to find her and threatens that he will kill her before his eyes. Fearing for Divya's life, he began his search for her to protect her. After narrating, Divya is taken by Vijay to safety. She then pleads with Vijay to accept Swetha, which he reciprocates.

After a while, Vijay finds out that she was abducted again. Vijay is shocked to see Sivarama out of jail again and takes Divya as bait. Divya, still innocent of Vijay's true relation to her, pleads with Vijay not to fight for her anymore because they are not related. But because Sivarama made her realise that his long-lost brother will die in front of her, she emotionally forgives him for the past as she briefly watches Vijay being beaten up by Sivarama's goons. Vijay finally finishes Sivarama's goons when he feels his sister finally acknowledging him as her brother. After a while, it was seen that Vijay and Divya are leaving to start a new life again as siblings, and the two invite Swetha to come along with them.

== Cast ==
- Gopichand as ACP T. Vijay IPS
- Anushka as Swetha
- Poonam Kaur as Divya, Vijay's estranged sister
- Manoj K. Jayan as Sivarama Goud (voice dubbed by P. Ravi Shankar)
- Ajay as Ajay, Sivarama's son
- Ali as Gymson
- Dharmavarapu Subramanyam as Swetha's father
- Sudha as Swetha's mother
- Tanikella Bharani as Karim
- M. S. Narayana as Dr. Aarogyam
- Sarath Babu as Commissioner Sarath
- Vinaya Prasad as Sarath's wife
- Prudhvi Raj as Police Officer
- Banerjee as DCP
- Subbaraya Sarma as Church Pastor
- Krishna Bhagawan as Dr. Krishna Bhagawan MBBS
- Raghu Babu as Athidhi Sastry
- Aarthi as Aarthi
- Pavala Shyamala as Colony Woman
- Fish Venkat as Sivarama Goud's henchman
- C. V. L. Narasimha Rao as Principal
- Ramaraju as Divya's uncle
- Ramachandra as Student
- Malladi Raghava as Judge
- Hema Sundar as Judge
- Vijaya Rangaraju as Goon
- Rachana Maurya (special appearance in song "Ole Ole")
- Anil Ravipudi (cameo as Hospital receptionist)

== Soundtrack ==
Souryam

Soundtrack album by Mani Sharma
- Released: 21 August 2008
- Recorded: 2008
- Genre: Soundtrack
- Length: 27:27
- Label: Aditya Music
- Producer: Mani Sharma

Mani Sharma chronology
| Hero (2008) | Souryam (2008) | Sasirekha Parinayam (2008) |

Music was composed by Mani Sharma and released on Aditya Music.

| No. | Title | Lyrics | Singer(s) | Length |
|---|---|---|---|---|
| 1. | "Hello Miss" | Ramajogayya Sastry | Karthik, Priya | 4:53 |
| 2. | "Buggalona" | Ramajogayya Sastry | Deepu, Malavika | 4:17 |
| 3. | "Ole Ole" | Bhaskarabhatla | Rahul Nambiar, Suchitra | 4:50 |
| 4. | "Gira Gira" | Bhaskarabhatla | Tippu | 4:33 |
| 5. | "Ammi Ammi" | Ananta Sriram | Hemachandra | 4:04 |
| 6. | "Pillo Naa" | Bhaskarabhatla | Tippu, Rita | 4:45 |
| Total length: | | | | 27:27 |

== Remakes ==
The film was remade into Kannada-language as Shourya, in Dhallywood as Mone Boro Koshto and in Tamil-language by Prabhu Deva as Vedi.

== Reception ==
Souryam received positive reviews. Idlebrain rated it 3/5, stating, "The film is aimed mainly at the masses and B/C center crowds. The film's commercial success depends on how the crowds embrace the sister sentiment in the film." Sify also rated it 3/5, giving it the verdict of "mass entertainer."
