= K. V. Kandaswamy =

Indian politician

K. V. Kandaswamy or k.v.k (1926 – 5 December 2008) was an Indian politician and former Member of the Legislative Assembly of Tamil Nadu. He was elected to the Tamil Nadu legislative assembly as an Anna Dravida Munnetra Kazhagam candidate from Kinathukadavu constituency in 1977, 1980 and 1984 elections. He was widely considered to be the right hand of the CM, Dr M. G. Ramachandran and R.M.Veerappan and instrumental in building Kongu region as AIADMK stronghold. In the 1977 election he defeated the then DMK cabinet minister M. Kannappan. Kandaswamy was very popular among his people and lived without any caste difference. It was said that there were only two houses in Tamil Nadu which do not close, one being that of M. G. Ramachandran and the other being his own house where he lived alone till his death in 2008. He was a notorious and aggressive campaigner often defying the party lines and the CM, earning him the name "Negamam Napolean". This name was also used in the film Amaidhi Padai.

He spoke against M.G.R in the Legislative Assembly on his proposal to tax coconut trees in the state and threatened to commit suicide if such a tax was imposed. He was immediately suspended for speaking against his own party and later M.G.R personally promise to withdraw the proposal. He was the president of the Coimbatore wing of ADMK since its inception and was instrumental in making Coimbatore into an ADMK bastion through popular irrigation schemes and his personal charisma. After the death of M. G. Ramachandran, he supported his widowed wife V. N. Janaki in the 1989 election when the party had broken down into two factions. The party lost the election and later the factions were united under Jayalalithaa. He continued as the president of the Coimbatore wing of AIADMK, but his increasing popularity threatened the new party leadership which gradually sidelined him. He finally quit the AIADMK in 1996 and joined his parent party of DMK and contested the 2006 election for the first with the DMK ticket but was defeated. An industrial training institute in Periya Negamam is named after him.
