= Veeram (2014 film) =

2014 Indian film by Siva

- Veeram Promotional Poster
- Directed by: Siruthai Siva
- Screenplay by: Siruthai Siva; Bharathan (dialogues)
- Story by: Siruthai Siva; Bhoopathi Raja
- Produced by: B. Venkatarama Reddy
- Starring: Ajith Kumar; Tamannaah Bhatia
- Cinematography: Vetri
- Edited by: Kasi Viswanathan
- Music by: Devi Sri Prasad
- Production company: Vijaya Productions
- Distributed by: Vijaya Pictures
- Release date: 10 January 2014
- Running time: 156 minutes
- Country: India
- Language: Tamil
- Budget: ₹45 crore
- Box office: ₹83−130 crore

Veeram (transl. Valour) is a 2014 Indian Tamil-language romantic action comedy film directed by Siva and produced by Vijaya Productions. The film stars Ajith Kumar and Tamannaah Bhatia, with a supporting cast including Vidharth, Bala, Santhanam, Nassar, Pradeep Rawat and Atul Kulkarni. The film's music was composed by Devi Sri Prasad, with cinematography handled by Vetri and editing done by Kasi Viswanathan.

Veeram was theatrically released worldwide on 10 January 2014. The film garnered positive reviews and performed well commercially, grossing ₹83–130 crore against a budget of ₹45 crore. It was remade in Telugu as Katamarayudu (2017), in Kannada as Odeya (2019), and in Hindi as Kisi Ka Bhai Kisi Ki Jaan (2023).

== Plot ==
Vinayagam is a brave person who lives with his four brothers, Murugan, Shanmugam, Kumaran, and Senthil, in the town of Oddanchatram in Dindigul district. They often get into fights, where Advocate "Bail" Perumal bails them out whenever legal issues arise because of their brawls. Vinayagam hates the idea of marriage as he feels that his wife might create disharmony among his brothers. Though the four younger brothers pretend they don't want to get married, they all have secret lovers.

The brothers learn through Vinayagam's childhood friend Collector Subbu that Vinayagam, in his school days, was in love with a girl named Koperundevi (fondly called Koppu), and his brothers scheme to find her and reintroduce her to Vinayagam, to rekindle their relationship, but later find that she is married now and has kids. The brothers conspire to find another woman named Koperundevi because Vinayagam is not in love with that girl so much as her name, and when he meets another girl with that name, he is sure to lose his heart to her, just because she bears that name. Though initially reluctant, Vinayagam later falls in love with her.

Vinayagam clashes with a goon, Vanangamudi, to take care of the village market. Vanangamudi tries to kill Vinayagam's brothers while Vinayagam kidnaps Vanangamudi's son. After clashing, Vinayagam banishes Vanangamudi from the town. While travelling by train to Koppu's village Kaveripattinam, Krishnagiri, Koppu narrates her family background to Vinayagam. Koppu's father, Nallasivam, was a respected man in the village who hated violence. His son was the exact opposite, who killed people, but when some goons killed him, Nallasivam refused to bury him and decided to make his village with peace and harmony. Later, a few goons enter the train, but Vinayagam bashes all the goons. Koppu is shocked to see Vinayagam, whom she thought was a non-violent person. She leaves for her village and tells Vinayagam not to come back again.

Vinayagam and his brothers arrive at Koppu's village with a clean-shaven look. He reveals to Koppu that he has changed and will never harbour violence again. He and his brothers are welcomed and respected by her family. Vinayagam is touched and impressed by their love, affection, and hospitality. Vinayagam discovers that a thug named Aadalarasu wants to kill Nallasivam and his family. Vinayagam confronts Aadalarasu in the Central Jail. He learns that Aadalarasu's father, Aavudaiyapan, was responsible for the blast of a matchstick factory. Nallasivam complained against Aavudaiyappan, who was later arrested and killed himself by jumping in front of a lorry from a police van. Aadalarasu witnessed his father's death and swore revenge against Nallasivam.

Vinayagam challenges Aadalarasu that he will protect Nallasivam's family, and he finishes all the goons and solves all their problems without the knowledge of Nallasivam and his family. When Nallasivam's granddaughter finds aruval under Vinayagam's jeep, Nallasivam orders Vinayagam to leave the town. Aadalarasu, who escapes from death penalty, arrives to kill Nallasivam, but Vinayagam keeps him and his family in a safe place. Aadalarasu informs Vinayagam that he has kidnapped Kumaran. Vinayagam arrives in time and saves his brother, but Aadalarasu attacks him. Nallasivam and his family, who arrive at the place, realise the risk he took to save the family. Though brutally attacked, Vinayagam rises steadily, where he kills Aadalarasu and his henchmen. Nallasivam, impressed with Vinayagam's valour, gets Vinayagam and Koppu married. Thus, Vinayagam and his brothers get married with great pomp.

== Cast ==
- Ajith Kumar as Vinayagam
- Tamannaah Bhatia as Koperundevi, Vinayagam's love interest
- Vidharth as Shanmugam, Vinayagam's brother
- Bala as Murugan, Vinayagam's brother
- Santhanam as Bail Perumal
- Nassar as Nallasivam
- Pradeep Rawat as Vanangamudi
- Atul Kulkarni as Aadalarasu
- Avinash as Aavudaiyappan. Aadalarasu's father (flashback)
- Munish as Senthil
- Suhail Chandhok as Kumaran
- Thambi Ramaiya as Savarimuthu
- Appukutty as Mayilvaganam
- Ramesh Khanna as District Collector Subbu
- Ilavarasu as Azhagappan
- Mayilsamy as Marikolunthu
- Shanmugarajan as Police Officer
- Amit Kumar Tiwari as Vanangamudi's son
- Abhinaya as Poongothai
- Manochitra as Anita
- Suza Kumar as Senbagam
- Vidyullekha Raman as Alamelu
- Rohini Hattangadi as Sr. Koppuram Devi
- Devadarshini as District Collector Subbu's wife
- Sumithra as Nallasivam Wife
- Kalairani
- Stunt Silva as Henchman
- Crane Manohar as College peon
- Paravai Muniyamma
- Yuvina Parthavi as Nallasivam's granddaughter
- Pawan as Nallasivam's son
- Periyardasan as Bhai
- R. N. R. Manohar as Maanikkam
- Sujatha Sivakumar as Nallasivam's younger sister
- Ashmitha Subramaniyam as Savarimuthu's daughter
- Sreeja Ravi as Teacher
- Yogi Babu as Henchman
- Japan Kumar as Gurka henchman
- Mippu
- Vazhakku En Muthuraman as Ashok Kumar Register
- Hello Kandasamy as Worker

== Production ==
=== Development ===
The potential collaboration between Vijaya Productions and Ajith Kumar was reported in November 2011, with speculation suggesting that Venkata Ramana Reddy wanted to commemorate his late father B. Nagi Reddy's 100th year since birth with a film project. Siva, who had made his debut in Tamil films with the 2011 film Siruthai, was noted as a potential candidate to direct the film, while Anushka Shetty was initially reported to play the female lead role. Subsequently, in early December 2011, Ajith signed on to play the lead role in the venture, with a poster released confirming Siva's participation, noting that Vetri and Yuvan Shankar Raja would be cinematographer and music composer, respectively.

=== Casting ===
Alongside Ajith, it was noted that four young actors would appear as his brothers in the venture. Vidharth, who rose to fame with his role in Mynaa, was signed on for the film after discussions with Prasanna was unsuccessful. Suhail Chandhok, brother of former Formula One racer Karun Chandhok, was signed on for a role after Ajith was impressed with a short film that Suhail had featured in. Munish, who appeared in Naanga, and Bala, director Siva's brother, were also selected to play Ajith's brothers. Santhanam, who featured in a pivotal role in Siva's previous film, was also chosen to play a supporting role in the film. Tamannaah Bhatia was chosen to play Ajith's pair in the film, marking her comeback to Tamil films after a three-year sabbatical. Vishakha Singh was approached to play Vidharth's pair in the film but her refusal subsequently meant the producers opted for Manochitra, who was previously seen in Aval Peyar Thamizharasi (2010), while Abhinaya signed for another lead role. Vidyullekha Raman signed to be Santhanam's pair for a third film. Jayaprakash, Jayaram and Rajeev Govinda Pillai were also initially reported to be a part of the cast, though a later press release did not confirm their participation. Kannada actor Avinash agreed to play a character "who, due to poverty, has become vengeful and is willing to do anything wrong for his own benefit".

Bhoopathi Raja has written the script along with Siva and Bharathan has written the dialogues.

=== Filming ===
A press note was released on 4 April 2013 announcing the start of the filming of the project, while also clarifying the cast and crew. The first schedule for the film began the next day in Hyderabad and went on for two weeks and more. The film was initially rumoured to be titled as Vetri Kondaan or Vinayagam Brothers before finally confirming Veeram. The shoot was completed on 2 November 2013.

Ajith had participated in a stunt sequence where he had to hang outside the train. The sequence was shot in a location situated in the Orissa border.

=== Themes and influences ===
The film's plot is about a brave person and his four younger brothers who are living in a village. Sudhish Kamath of The Hindu noted that the scenes were inspired from films like Murattu Kaalai (1980), Annaamalai (1992) and Baashha (1995).

== Music ==
Veeram

Soundtrack album to Veeram by Devi Sri Prasad
- Released: 20 December 2013
- Recorded: 2013
- Genre: Feature film soundtrack
- Length: 19:33
- Language: Tamil
- Label: Junglee Music
- Producer: Devi Sri Prasad

Devi Sri Prasad chronology
1: Nenokkadine (2014)	Veeram (2013)	Brahman (2014)

The film's soundtrack was composed by Devi Sri Prasad. The music rights were purchased by Junglee Music. The album, consisting of 5 tracks, was scheduled to be released on 20 December 2013 but the tracks leaked on the Internet on 18 December 2013. The music was officially launched on 20 December followed by airplay of the songs on FM stations.

All lyrics are written by Viveka.

Track list
No.	Title	Singer(s)	Length
1.	"Nallavannu Solvaanga"	Devi Sri Prasad	4:36
2.	"Ival Dhaana"	Sagar, Shreya Ghoshal	4:14
3.	"Thangamae Thangamae"	Adnan Sami, Priyadarshini	4:06
4.	"Jing Chikka Jing Chikka"	Pushpavanam Kuppusamy, Magizhini Manimaaran	4:30
5.	"Veeram"	Anand, Koushik, Deepak, Jagadish	2:48
Total length:			19:33

== Release ==
A first-look teaser was released on 7 November 2013. The second teaser was released on 5 December 2013 with a dialogue "Enna Naan Solrathu". The satellite rights of the film were purchased by Sun TV. Central Board of Film Certification gave the film "U" certificate. The film was released in 400 screens in Tamil Nadu, 120 screens in Kerala, 50 screens in Karnataka, and in 220 screens overseas.

=== Distribution ===
Across Tamil Nadu, Veeram was distributed by various parties: in Chennai City by Sri Thenandal Films, in NSC area by Sri Thenandal Films, in T.T (Trichy and Thanjavur) by Green Screens, in M.R (Madurai, Ramanadhapuram) are by Gopuram Films and in T. K. (Thirunelveli, Kanyakumari) are by Sri Mookambiga Films. Vendhar Movies released the film in Coimbatore and surroundings through Vel Films and in Salem and surroundings through G Film.

=== Re-release ===
The film's was re-released on 1 May 2025, coinciding with International Workers' Day and Ajith Kumar's birthday, after 11 years of its original release.

== Reception ==
=== Critical reception ===
The film received positive reviews from critics.

The Times of India gave 3 out of 5 stars and wrote, "The film is a template masala film – a superhuman hero, his cronies who will sing his praises all the time, a beautiful-looking heroine, a raging villain. It has no room for logic, moving from one hero-worshipping scene to the next and is aimed at our visceral tastes. The story is in service of its star and, it is unapologetic about it." Rediff gave 2.5 stars out of 5 and stated, "Veeram is a treat for Ajith fans." Sify gave 4 stars out of 5 calling it a "Mass Entertainer" and writing, "The film works mainly due to Ajith's charisma and Siva's script. It is a formula film where essential masala has been correctly mixed in the right proposition. On the whole, Veeram is an enjoyable fun ride." Baradwaj Rangan from The Hindu wrote, "A family with five brothers, another family with representatives from three generations, annan-thambi sentiment, amma sentiment, appa sentiment, and in the middle of all this, a big star giving his fans what they want – if Faazil and Vikraman collaborated on a 'mass' masala movie, it might end up looking like Siva's Veeram. Veeram is about the hero. Everything else – the crude dramatics, the piles of clichés, the characters (especially the bad guys) who come and go as they please – is secondary." Bangalore Mirror gave 3.5 out of 5 and called it "a festival cracker for the fans of Thala."

Deccan Herald wrote, "Tiresomely long, with second half, tad sagging, Veeram has Thala Ajith in fulsome flow with all fireworks. While Ajith's fans may swoon and swear by his one-man demolition squad show that will give even hulk Arnold Schwarzenegger the blushes, for the rest though, it's a matinee masala to stay away." IANS gave 2.5 stars out of 5 and wrote, "Veeram is a classic example, which elevates Ajith and leaves the rest of the ensemble cast behind. The film is dedicated to Ajith, who is as charismatic as ever in his role. However, he is unfortunately not complemented by a strong screenplay."

=== Box office ===
In its first 10 days, Veeram collected ₹34.25 crore, and throughout its theatrical run, it grossed ₹83–130 crore.

== Accolades ==
Date of ceremony	Award	Category	Recipient(s) and nominee(s)	Result	Ref.
25 April 2015	Vijay Awards	Favourite Film	Veeram (Vijaya Vauhini Studios)	Nominated	
25 April 2015	Vijay Awards	Favourite Director	Siva	Nominated	
25 April 2015	Vijay Awards	Favourite Hero	Ajith Kumar	Nominated	
26 June 2015	Filmfare Awards South	Best Actor – Tamil	Ajith Kumar	Nominated	

== Remakes ==
Veeram was remade in Telugu as Katamarayudu (2017) in Kannada as Odeya (2019), and in Hindi as Kisi Ka Bhai Kisi Ki Jaan (2023).
