= Bawaria robberies =

2005 Indian police operation

- Date: 1995-2005
- Location: Tamil Nadu and other parts of India
- Type: Murder, robbery, and assault
- Perpetrator: Bawaria gang
- Deaths: 15 (13 public, 2 perpetrators)
- Injuries: 63
- Arrests: Oma Bawaria and eight others
- Sentence: Death penalty later commuted to life imprisonment for two (one died in custody, other released on appeal) and prison terms for others

Bawaria robberies were a series of robbery, murder, and assault that were perpetrated in residential areas along various national highways in the Indian state of Tamil Nadu between 1995 and 2005. These cases of organised dacoity were carried out by a group of truck drivers from the Bawaria community. The group looted about ₹20 million (US$210,000) across 24 robberies while killing 13 people, and injuring 63 others during the incidents.

The Tamil Nadu Police formed a special investigation team under the aegis of S. R. Jangid to capture the robbers who were wanted in multiple cases across India. The subsequent police operation resulted in the deaths of two, and arrest of eight others including the leader Oma Bawaria. The perpetrators were sentenced to various prison terms by various courts of India.

== Incidents ==
On 7 June 1995, a gang attacked a house at Walajapet in Ranipet district, and looted more than ₹50,000 (US$520) while killing one and injuring three others. A similar robbery event occurred in the same town next year. After a break of four years, the gang committed a robbery event at Avinashi in Coimbatore district in 2001. Three more incidents were reported from Dharmapuri, and Salem districts in the same year.

The frequency increased progressively and the gang committed further eight robberies across the state of Tamil Nadu including six in western part of the state and two in the outskirts of the capital Chennai in 2002. On 12 September 2002, the gang killed two people including a local politician, and injured six others during a robbery attempt at Salem. They took cash, and two firearms from the attacked house and escaped on trucks while the police responded to the crime. In 2003, the gang committed four robberies in the northern part of the state, which resulted in three deaths. In 2004, they perpetrated further crimes in and around Chennai, resulting in deaths of two people in Thiruverkadu, and multiple injuries.

In January 2005, the gang attacked the house of MLA Sudarsanam in Tiruvallur district. The perpetrators shot the legislator dead, and escaped with cash and jewellery. The gang also shot at other people who responded to the cries for help, while escaping in trucks parked about 1 km (0.62 mi) away on the highway. The robbers committed another robbery at Bargur on the next night. The gang was involved in 24 robberies since the first incident in 1995. They had stolen cash and valuables worth over ₹20 million (US$210,000), and the events had resulted in the deaths of 13 people and 63 injuries.

== Perpetrators ==
The perpetrators were a group of truck drivers belonging to the nomadic Bawaria community from North India. The Bawarias were involved and wanted in multiple robberies, and shootings across various states in India. The group that committed the robberies in Tamil Nadu was led by Omprakash Bawaria (Oma). Oma and his brother Jagadish Bawaria were already wanted in connection with various cases. The gang usually struck houses situated along national highways across South India, committing robberies and murders.

== Modus operandi ==
The gang committed the robberies while transporting goods by trucks from North to South India. After unloading the trucks, the gang targeted affluent houses along the way. The trucks were equipped with hidden compartments to conceal the weapons and stolen goods. They usually attacked on New Moon days during the early hours. The trucks were parked at a safe distance from the target, and the perpetrators walked towards the target under the cover of darkness. While the leader stood watch outside the targeted house with a gun, the other members broke the front door using steel axes, iron rods, and boulders.

The gang robbed the houses of cash, and valuables. They attacked the residents of the house without any provocation with various weapons. They shot and killed any resident who resisted or interfered with the robbery attempt. They also shot at pet dogs, and other people during the robberies. They usually conversed in their native language so that the residents would not understand.

== Investigation ==
In January 2005, a special investigation team was formed by the Government of Tamil Nadu under Director General of Police S. R. Jangid. The team consisted of four deputy superintendents, ten inspectors, ten sub-inspectors, three finger print analysts, and thirty other policemen. The investigative team analysed the mode of operations of the gang, and compared them with the known information about various criminal gangs across India. Teams were sent to various states across India to investigate similar incidents. Based on the language used by the criminals, and the usage of country made firearms, and iron rods, the police suspected the involvement of Bawarias.

As the Bawarias originated from the North Indian states, several teams headed by deputy superintendent were sent to the states of Haryana, Punjab, Rajasthan, and Uttar Pradesh to try and identify the culprits. Based on the fingerprints recovered at the scene, the team tried to match them with the available criminal records. By the way of manual comparison of fingerprints with the records from the inmates of various prisons, the team identified Ashok Bawaria, whose fingerprint was recorded in 1996 when he was lodged at a prison in Agra. Based on the details, a police team was dispatched to Bharatpur in Rajasthan.

== Capture ==
With aid from Rajasthan Police, the special investigation team arrested Ashok Bawaria and organiser Dharam Singh Bawaria in February 2005. Based on the confessions of the arrested members, the police uncovered the mode of operations of the robbers. The police also seized four trucks that were used in the robbery from various parts of the country. The police identified the other perpetrators using the documents, and call records of the sim cards seized from the arrested.

Gudu Bawaria was arrested near Paliwal in March 2005, and based on the information provided by him, the police arrested other members of the gang including Jagadish in August 2005 in Pune. The leader of the gang Oma and his wife were captured during a raid in coordination with Uttar Pradesh Police in Kannauj in September 2005. Over the course of the next few years, the police team arrested more members of the gang. About 13 people were arrested in connection with the case, while the hunt for the other accused continued.

In March 2012, the police intercepted gang members Vijay and Bsura Bawaria near Meerut. When the suspects opened fire against the police, the police returned fire and both of them were killed. As of 2021, 14 of the accused had still not been captured.

== Trial and sentencing ==
The accused were charged under sections 395 to 397 of the Indian Penal Code. In 2006, a special sessions court awarded death penalty for Oma and Ashok Bawaria, and prison terms for the other accused. The Madras High Court later commuted the death sentences to life imprisonment. While Oma died in custody, Ashok appealed against the verdict in the Supreme Court of India. In December 2012, the Supreme Court set aside the verdict of the lower courts due to non establishment of guilt beyond reasonable doubt. As the accused had already served eight years in prison, the court ordered his release. In 2021, Jagadish petitioned the Madras High Court for a release as the appeal is pending and he had served more than 15 years in prison.

== In popular culture ==
The 2017 Tamil film Theeran Adhigaaram Ondru directed by H. Vinoth was based on the incidents.
