= Bawri language =

Bawri may refer to:

- Bawari language (not to be confused by bagri language), a language of Rajasthan and the Punjab region of India and Pakistan
- Bawri, a dialect of the Jaunsari language of Uttarakhand, India
