= Theeran Adhigaaram Ondru =

2017 Indian film by H. Vinoth

- Poster
- Directed by: H. Vinoth
- Written by: H. Vinoth
- Based on: Operation Bawaria
- Produced by: S. R. Prakashbabu; S. R. Prabhu
- Starring: Karthi; Rakul Preet Singh; Abhimanyu Singh
- Cinematography: Sathyan Sooryan
- Edited by: T. Shivanandeeswaran
- Music by: Ghibran
- Production company: Dream Warrior Pictures
- Distributed by: Reliance Entertainment
- Release date: 17 November 2017
- Running time: 163 minutes
- Country: India
- Language: Tamil
- Box office: est.₹97Crore

Theeran Adhigaaram Ondru (transl. The Warrior: Chapter One) or simply Theeran is a 2017 Indian Tamil-language action thriller film written and directed by H. Vinoth and produced by S. R. Prakashbabu and S. R. Prabhu under the banner Dream Warrior Pictures. Based on the Bawaria robberies, it depicts the nefarious activity of organised dacoity committed in Tamil Nadu during the late 1990s and early 2000s and the subsequent investigation and arrest of robbers by a special investigation team of the Tamil Nadu Police led by Director general of police S. R. Jangid. The film stars Karthi as the titular character Theeran, modelled on Jangid, alongside Rakul Preet Singh and Abhimanyu Singh.

Vinoth had planned for the script based on the incident even before his debut film Sathuranga Vettai (2014), but he later worked on the project in late 2014. To research further, he had met many police officers who handled similar cases. Following an official announcement in December 2016, principal photography commenced in January 2017 and ended that July. Filming took place in many real locations across Chennai and North India, in order to capture the authenticity of the film and has been shot in locations where the incident happened. The film's cinematography was handled by Sathyan Sooryan and the editing was done by Sivanandeeswaran. Ghibran composed the soundtrack and the film score.

The film, distributed and co-produced by Reliance Entertainment, was released worldwide on 17 November 2017 and opened to critical acclaim, praising the direction, writing, cinematography, soundtrack, musical score, and cast performances—especially that of Karthi. The authenticity of capturing the incidents, along with the realistic portrayal of the Tamil Nadu Police in fiction was highlighted and praised by critics. It was a major commercial success, grossing ₹96 crore. In addition, the film won the Ananda Vikatan Cinema Awards, Techofes Awards, two Edison and Vijay Awards, each. It received three nominations at the South Indian International Movie Awards and five Filmfare Awards; the film's only win was Critics Best Actor – Tamil for Karthi. A sequel to the film was announced in November 2023.

== Plot ==
In the present day, Sasi, a police officer tasking his team with digitizing old case manuscripts, stumbles upon a chilling, unsolved dacoity murder case from years prior. Intrigued, he calls up the officer who led the investigation, Theeran Thirumaran.

In 1995, Theeran tops his police training academy and is posted as a Deputy Superintendent of Police. He returns to his hometown of Thanjavur, where he falls in love with and marries his neighbour, Priya. Simultaneously, a brutal gang of dacoits begins raiding houses situated along the highways of Tamil Nadu, gruesomely murdering the inhabitants and looting their belongings. After one such savage attack occurs in Ponneri, Theeran is transferred there to head the investigation alongside Inspector Sathya. Despite their efforts, the initial investigation hits a dead end.

By 2003, Theeran, Sathya, and a dedicated team of officers travel across India to match the dacoits' fingerprints. Theeran discovers that the criminals belong to a fierce, nomadic tribe left marginalized after Indian Independence. When bureaucratic carelessness forces a temporary halt to the case, the gang escalates their crimes by raiding the house of a ruling-party MLA and murdering him. Facing immense public pressure, the government grants Theeran absolute authority and resources to track down the gang.

In 2004, the team secures a fingerprint match from a prison in Uttar Pradesh, tracing the suspects to a transport lorry heading back to Ponneri. Before they can intercept it, the dacoits execute a retaliatory raid on Sathya's house, murdering his wife and parents. They also assault Priya after she tries to protect Sathya's daughter, leaving her in a vegetative coma. Driven by fury, Theeran assembles a specialized task force to hunt down the gang's ruthless leader, Oma. They set up a covert camp in Rajasthan, identifying Oma's tribal settlement, but are violently driven out by the protective villagers.

While the operation is underway, Theeran receives news that Priya has succumbed to her injuries. Fueled by grief, he captures the gang's main organizer, prompting an infuriated Oma to vow to eliminate the police team. Theeran intercepts Oma on a moving train, but Oma and his close associates, Khali and Bhora, manage to overpower the guards, pull the emergency chain, and flee into the desert. A local shepherd offers the exhausted police team refuge in his village for the night.

Utilizing tracking and hunting tactics, Oma's gang infiltrates the village under the cover of darkness. Theeran anticipates the ambush, formulating a counter-strategy that successfully eliminates the entire gang except for the leaders. Oma sets the village ablaze to cover his escape, but Theeran shoots Khali dead during the chaos. Following a grueling, night-long chase through the desert, Theeran overpowers Oma in a final confrontation, dragging him back to Tamil Nadu to face justice.

In 2017, it is revealed that despite his heroic actions, Theeran's uncompromising honesty has resulted in him being sidelined to a mundane, low-profile desk job in traffic vigilance, where he lives a solitary life. Sathya and his daughter visit him, and Sasi, deeply moved by the documented history of Theeran's sacrifice, honors the veteran officer with a respectful salute.

== Cast ==
- Karthi as DSP Theeran Thirumaran IPS
- Rakul Preet Singh as Sripriya, Theeran's wife (voice over by Renuka Kathir)
- Abhimanyu Singh as Omveer Singh (Oma)
- Bose Venkat as Inspector Sathya
- Praveena as Theeran's mother
- Manobala as Priya's father
- Kalyani Natarajan as Priya's mother
- Sathyan as Theeran's friend
- Sonia as Sathya's wife
- Pradeep Rayan as Constable Sasi
- R. N. R. Manohar as Minister
- Abhirami as Theeran's sister
- Kishor Kadam as Haram Singh
- Mathew Varghese as IG Vijay Rathod IPS
- Vignesh Vijayan as Vicky, Special Team officer
- Rohit Pathak as Bane Singh
- Narra Srinivas as Madhur
- Surender Thakur as Kaali
- Prayas Mann as Bohra
- Jameel Khan as Pandit
- TSR Srinivasan as Court Judge
- Scarlett Mellish Wilson as item number "Tinga Tinga"

== Production ==
=== Development ===
Following the success of his first film Sathuranga Vettai (2014), director H. Vinoth was keen to make a sequel to the film starring either Suriya or Ajith Kumar, but their reluctance meant that he moved on to work on a different project based on the Operation Bawaria case. He stated that he had the idea of making a film on the case before he made Sathuranga Vettai but had forgotten about it until he opened a food parcel, which was coincidentally covered with a newspaper article narrating the events of the operation and the incident subsequently inspired him to work on the script. Initially, planned as a road-trip film, the script was later evolved into a full-fledged police story revolving around the entire timelines of the operation and the events happened. As a part of his research, Vinoth met a top-rung police officer with the help of his close friend, as a part of his research and had met nearly hundred officials who handled similar cases.

"It is an action movie inspired by real-life police stories. The film talks about an officer’s personal journey, the shortcomings in the system and what our status is when we go out of Tamil Nadu — our comfort zone and how we are viewed. The interesting elements added to the script by the director, Vinoth, will definitely change the general perspective of a cop."

— Karthi, on his titular character and role in Theeran Adhigaaram Ondru in an interview with Deccan Chronicle's editor-in-chief, Anupama Subramanian

In February 2016, he approached Karthi to play the lead role in the police drama film and was insistent that the final version carried the same "social responsibility angle" that the initial script had carried. Karthi expressed his immediate interest in working on the film, and recalled that he had first heard about the case while he was working on the making of Siruthai (2011). Vinoth continued to script the film throughout the year, while Karthi finished his pending work for Kaashmora (2016) and Mani Ratnam's Kaatru Veliyidai (2017). The film was officially titled as Theeran Adhigaaram Ondru in December 2016, with S. R. Prabhu's Dream Warrior Pictures agreed to produce the film in co-production with Reliance Entertainment which had distributed the film.

Speaking about the scaling and production of the film, H. Vinoth said that "it is a bigger film than Sathuranga Vettai. That film, was just 10% of the original vision he had executed and planned to construct the six chapters of the film, with each chapter set within a specific geography, a dialect and a colour tone, which he had given up due to budget constraints". In this film, he had planned to shoot in original locations instead of cheating terrains in Chennai where they experience all that characters go through. Vinoth said that the producer gave full freedom on the filming without having thoughts on the film's budget.

=== Casting ===
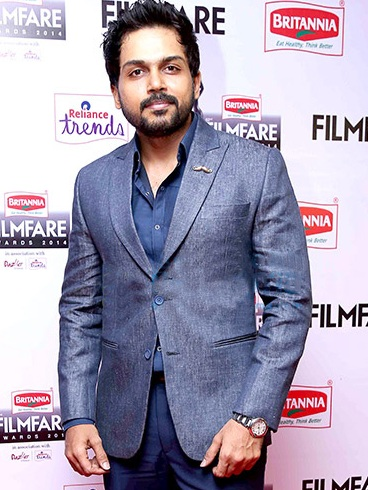
Karthi plays the role of the titular character Theeran, based on Tamil Nadu DGP S. R. Jangid, who headlined the Operation Bawaria case.

Karthi plays the titular character Theeran, modelled on the Tamil Nadu Director General of Police S. R. Jangid, who led a special team to track down the main criminals involved in dacoity as a part of the Operation Bawaria case. Interestingly, while compared to his brother, Suriya's character Durai Singam in the Singam franchise, Karthi said that "he has a command over things and he can reprimand anyone he wants", but referred the titular role as "an upright cop who goes about his work in a tactful manner" and is true to the original character despite tweaked. For Karthi's costumes in the film, the team actively chose to use organic cotton shirts after being recommended to by Karthi's mother, Lakshmi Sivakumar since he felt that "the products were cheap and made of good-quality organic cotton, while also wanted to promote and encourage the product, starting it from our own production". To prepare for his role, Karthi underwent police training at the YMCA Campus in Chennai even before production began.

Rakul Preet Singh was signed to play the leading female role in the film. Talking about her character, Karthi said that "she has a nice and meaty role in it and would bring the much-needed relief in the film". Abhimanyu Singh was selected to portray the main antagonist Omveer Singh (Oma the fiend), based on the main culprit Om Bawaria involved in the operation Bawaria case. His character was considered to be a unique role in the film. Bose Venkat was also selected to portray a police officer in the film, with the actor stating that the role gave him "a new dimension and a new identity". Telugu actor Narra Srinivas made his debut in Tamil cinema by playing a police officer. Sathyan Sooryan was selected to handle the cinematography for the film, while Dhilip Subbarayan, Kathir, Sivanandeeswaran were signed to handle the stunt, art departments and editing respectively.

=== Filming ===
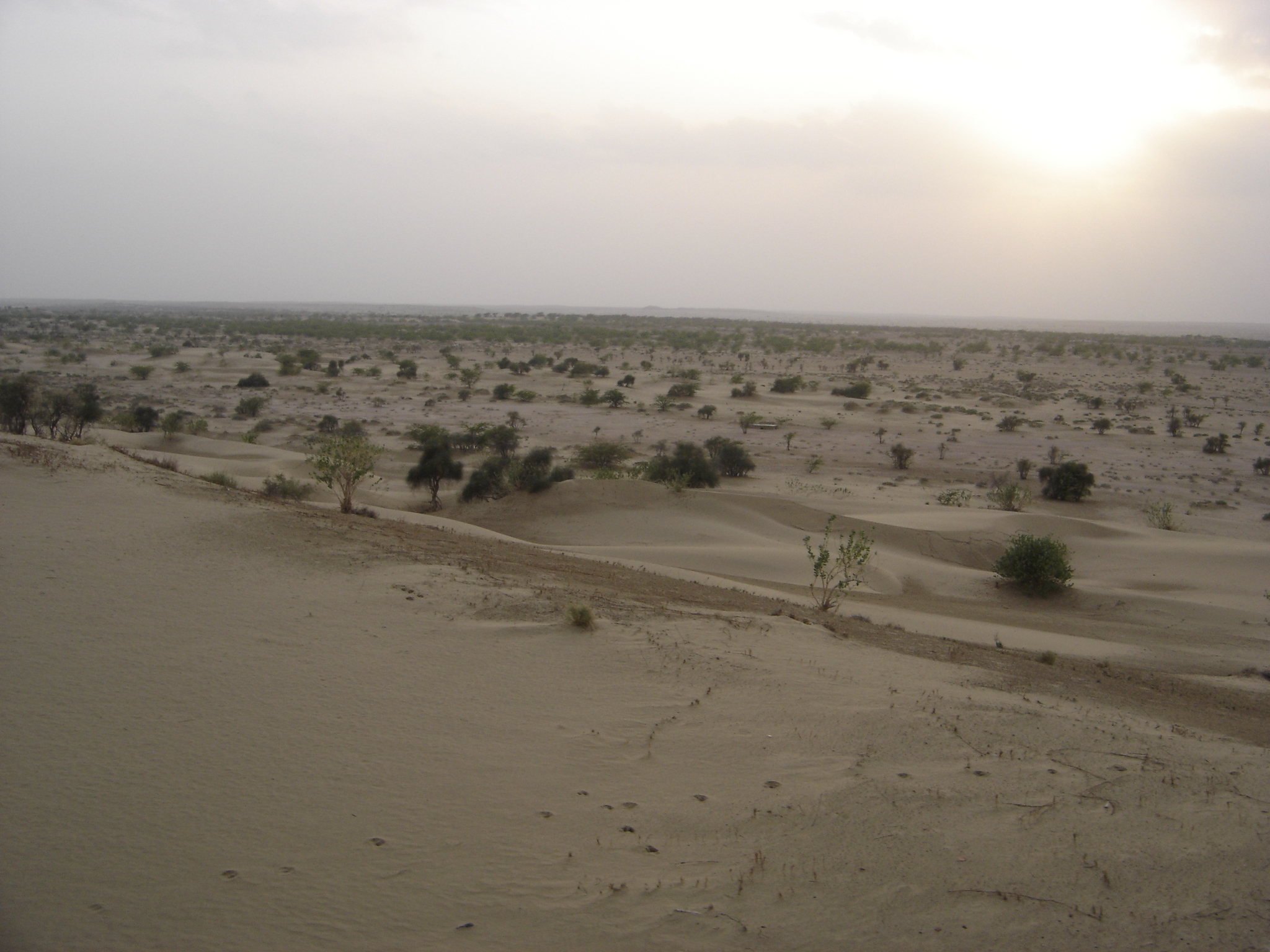
Major portions of the film was shot in several parts of Rajasthan.

In December 2016, a photo shoot for the film was held at Balu Mahendra Studios in Chennai with fashion photographer Venket Ram capturing the stills of Karthi's look in the film. The shooting of the film kickstarted on 17 January 2017, with major sequences being shot in Chennai, and the team later headed to North India for filming several sequences. In mid-February 2017, the team headed to Rajasthan for shooting action scenes and the schedule went on for 40 days. Later, another 40-day schedule was held in Bhuj in mid-March 2017. To make the film as authentic as possible, Vinoth actively hired artistes from the regions and insisted on shooting in such locations, rather than replicating the terrains in Chennai or in studios. As the film takes place for more than a decade beginning from the 1980s, Vinoth had to shoot at well-developed places, instead of constructing sets as Vinoth said that "the storyboard has nearly 150 sites and it is impossible to construct sets in many locations, as a result went on a location scouting for many places which took a long time".

Though the realistic approach was praised, the crew members working on the film faced difficulties while shooting in the project, where several of the film's cast and crew fell sick during the making of the project as a result of the warm climate. On filming a chase scene involving two buses on a highway in Bhuj, Karthi said that "the exposure to the harsh sunlight became unbearable that he was literally under the verge of developing sun stroke". While another sequence featuring Karthi riding a horse in a river bed was filmed at Rajasthan-Gujarat border, the female horse named Chandini ran for two kilometres without break before finally stopping due to exhaustion. Karthi said that "the horse was only used in enclosed spaces, so when, the film was shot in a wide area and exposed to such freedom, the horse just began to run". The team also encountered sandstorm while shooting for the film, where a crane toppled over and drone cameras got damaged; the locals asked the team to cover themselves with blankets and patiently wait till the storm subsided. Karthi, in an interview, described it as one of his most extensive action films, remarking the action sequences were not easy to execute.

A huge set was erected in Rajasthan for few sequences in the film. In April 2017, an item number featuring actress Scarlett Mellish Wilson at Jaisalmer Fort in Rajasthan, with the song being choreographed by Brindha. In mid-June, the team returned to Chennai to shoot the final schedule of the film which took place for a month. As of late-June, the team had completed more than 95% of the sequences, and needed 3–4 days, to complete the entire shoot. With the patchwork scenes being completed, the team wrapped the shooting of the film by mid-July 2017.

=== Post-production ===
Post-production of the film simultaneously began during the final schedule of the shoot. Karthi completed dubbing for the film at the same time. The animation sequence about the backstory of Bawaria was headlined by R. Senthil Kumar and S. Jayachandran of Hybrid Studio, a Chennai-based animation company. Vinoth consulted and hired the team after eventually working for Sathuranga Vettai (2014). He gave the script quite early, as it had scope for animation as it had a couple of portions that involved history. Jayachandran used the painting style for one portion and a graphic novel approach for the pre-interval sequence, with the primary use of colors — black, white and red — since blood was the theme of the film. The painting style that was the more complex one which had demanded more resources and concentration for the team.

The two-and-half minute sequence had 4,000 frames with each frame being painted individually. So the animation team hired ten students from Government College of Arts, and were taught to paint the frames digitally. The process completed within one-and-a-half months, as compared to manual painting that may take a long time. The animation and production of this sequence went on for six months. Speaking about the use of animation, Vinoth said that "the scenes might feel difficult in production as it required the historical approach and further more it featured excessive violence sequences, that may result in huge cuts when it comes to censors. So the use of animation was considered as the appropriate one."

== Soundtrack ==
The film score and seven-song soundtrack is composed by Ghibran in his maiden collaboration with Karthi and H. Vinoth. Lyricists Thamarai, Umadevi, Vivek, Raju Murugan, Ranjith, Udayakumar and Soundararajan penned each song in the album. Besides composing, Ghibran also co-wrote the track "Sevatha Pulla" with Ranjith, who led vocals for the track. Most of the tracks appear as montages in the film, except "Tinga Tinga". The soundtrack was released at a soft launch held on 2 November 2017 at Sathyam Cinemas in Chennai.

== Historical accuracy ==
The film depicts Operation Bawaria, the investigation of a series of dacoity cases by the Tamil Nadu Police Department. The operation led to the gunning down of two members of a criminal gang belonging to the Bawariya tribe from Uttar Pradesh as well as further arrests in the 2000s. Armed dacoits had struck affluent houses along National Highways in Tamil Nadu, Karnataka and Andhra Pradesh in the late 1990s and early 2000s. The operation against the criminals was officially launched in January 2005 soon after the murder of AIADMK MLA Sudarsanam from Gummidipoondi. A special team led by the then Director General of Police S. R. Jangid, worked in coordination with the Uttar Pradesh Police and intelligence agencies to track down the wanted criminals — Oma Bawaria, Bsura Bawaria, and Vijay Bawaria among others. The teams worked for several weeks to put together information and camped in remote locations in Rajasthan, Haryana and Punjab before gunning down Bsura Bawaria and Vijay Bawaria. The other prime suspects, Oma Bawaria, and K. Lakshman, alias Ashok Bawaria, were then arrested and brought to Tamil Nadu, where they were convicted and awarded the death penalty by a special court. The film was made in close consultation with Jangid and the other officers involved in the operation. Post-release of the film, Jangid appreciated the team for their realistic portrayal of events and praised the director's research for the film.

== Release ==
In September 2017, the makers kickstarted the promotions by launching the dates of the teaser and trailer release, with the film's scheduled release date of 17 November 2017 was announced. As per the official announcement by the production team, the teaser of the film was released on 27 September 2017, coinciding the Dusshera weekend. The official trailer was launched on the eve of Diwali (17 October 2017). Reliance Entertainment purchased the worldwide distribution rights, whilst Aditya Music which had the film's music rights, gained acquisition for the rights of the film in Andhra Pradesh and Telangana regions. The Tamil Nadu theatrical rights valued at ₹15 crore (US$1.6 million), and Dream Warrior Pictures sent the film to its area-wise distributors — Sathyam Cinemas (Chennai), Sivasakthi Theatres (Chengalpet), Pondichery Suresh (North Arcot), Alankar Theatres Devraj (South Arcot), CinePark (Coimbatore), Baradhan Films (Trichy–Thanjavur), Kandhaswamy Arts Centre (Madurai–Ramanathapuram), Subbu Raj (Tirunelveli–Kanyakumari) and 7G Films (Salem). Except for Chennai, Trichy–Thanjavur and Madurai–Ramanathapuram territories, all the areas has been sold on Minimum guarantee (MG) basis, while the theatrical rights in these regions have been sold on distribution basis.

The film opened in more than 450 theatres worldwide, which is a biggest release of a Karthi-starrer till date. The pre-bookings of the film started on 15 November 2017. Sathyam Cinemas allocated the main screen for the opening day of the release. In United States, the premiere shows for the film were conducted on 16 November, a day before the Indian release. Atmus Entertainment acquired the theatrical rights in the country, with the film being screened at 160 theatres in 83 locations. Even before the theatrical release, Star Vijay and Amazon Prime Video acquired the satellite and digital rights of the film. The film was made available in Amazon Prime Video, a month after its theatrical release, while the film's television premiere took place on 14 January 2018, coinciding with Pongal.

Post-release, a section of communities expressed disappointment over the depiction of Bawariya community as a clan of criminals. The makers released a statement, in response to the issue, saying "The movie is only based on the robbery incidents happened in various states of India. The film has not portrayed any community in bad light. No community thrives only on murder and robbery." The producers further stated that the controversial scene and the word used to describe the community will not be included in theatres, television broadcast and official online streaming portal.

== Reception ==
=== Box-office ===
In the first three days, the film fetched more than ₹10 crore (US$1.0 million) in Tamil Nadu box office, At the Chennai city box-office, the film netted ₹1.79 crore (US$190,000) from 291 shows in first three days. The number of shows further increased to 340 from 20 November, after the positive word-of-mouth received. Within the first five days, the film netted ₹1.36 crore (US$140,000) whilst, at the second weekend, the film earned ₹1.25 crore (US$130,000) from 243 shows. Despite new releases in the second week, the film topped the first position in the Chennai box-office. The total collection in the territory in the first 10 days, was reported to be ₹4.41 crore (US$460,000). At the end of its theatrical run, the emerged as the highest-grossing film of Karthi, earned ₹97 crore (US$10 million). Its record was later broken by Kaithi (2019), which earned ₹100 crore.

=== Critical response ===
The film opened to critical acclaim, with praise directed on Karthi's performance, and Vinoth's direction and writing, apart from the realistic portrayal of Tamil Nadu Police in fiction, the incidents and the major technical aspects of the film.

The Times of India gave the film 4/5 stars and wrote: "Vinoth’s detailing with help from an able crew that pitches in with some of their best work to elevate the film from being a stand cop thriller." Srinivasa Ramanujan of The Hindu stated it as "an engrossing cop film that keeps you glued to the screen every moment" and further wrote "There’s sincerity in the writing and research and honesty in the performances. There are many highlights in Theeran, some of which even makes us evaluate how cops are portrayed in films. We've seen many cop films before. But Theeran hits home hard." Haricharan Pudipeddi of Hindustan Times stated that "Theeran is a gripping, explosive action drama that works despite its lengthy running time and the tiresome romantic portion which can be overseen by the end of the film." Baradwaj Rangan of Film Companion South wrote "There are plenty of sharp, funny lines, and the highlights keep coming, like a superbly choreographed action stretch on a bus. For Vinoth, Theeran Adhigaaram Ondru is a vast improvement over Sathuranga Vettai, where one sensed a lot of entertaining writing and little else. Even if it falls short of the standards it sets for itself, the film gives us more than most action movies do."

Ashameera Aiyyappan of The Indian Express said that "the film delivers what it promises and packs quite a neat punch in most places" and gave three out of five stars. Anupama Subramanian of Deccan Chronicle stated that the film "stands out for its honest and riveting portrayal of cops in fiction". Poornima Murali of News18 called the film as "gripping" and assigned a score of 3.5/5 stars. Writing for Firstpost, film critic and trade analyst Sreedhar Pillai stated that "The film is very different in tone and presentation. The makers authentically portray the functioning of police and how they investigate. They have also shown us the practical difficulties in arresting criminals who operate outside the state without much commercial glorification or melodrama. The only commercial compromise Vinoth has made is to have a romantic plot for the hero for the regular family moments, comedy and background songs."

A critic from Behindwoods praised the action sequences in the film, which comes as a stand-out apart from "the intense suspense drama and the pace". Sify rated the film three out of five saying "an important story gets turned into a compelling film". Calling it as "one of the best films of the year", Indiaglitz said that "If Vinoth's Sathuranga Vettai is one of the most authentic deconstruction of heist and deception crimes Theeran is the same for police procedure. Like how he posts a salute to the true cops who cracked the crimes in real life he deserves one for his painstaking research, authentic narration and plain honest hard work". Rediff-based writer Ganesh Nadar, called the film as "riveting". Sowmya Rajendran of The News Minute said "Theeran is a cop film entirely from the perspective of law enforcers and that makes its politics troubling. Nevertheless, given that we've had a slew of films in this genre in recent times (including the now-getting-stale Singam series), its triumph lies in managing to pull off something fresh and original." Sudhir Srinivasan of The New Indian Express stated that "Theeran Adhigaram Ondru isn’t your usual Tamil cop film, but that sadly doesn’t stop it from being crippled by some usual issues. The love angle is wholly dispensable, regardless of what Theeran’s manipulative voice-over will make you believe, and also by the inclusion of disappointing elements like the outdated villain-item-number. Part of the love you feel for the film is also watered down by this inability to wrap up things efficiently. But, nevertheless, it is a solid cop-film."

== Awards and nominations ==
Award (Note: Awards, festivals and organizations are in alphabetical order.)	Date of ceremony (Note: Date is linked to the article about the awards held that year, wherever possible.)	Category	Recipient(s)	Result	Ref.
Ananda Vikatan Cinema Awards	10 January 2018	Best Stunt Director	Dhilip Subbarayan	Won	
Edison Awards	26 February 2018	Best Actor	Karthi	Won	
Edison Awards	26 February 2018	Best Editor	T. Sivanandeeswaran	Won	
Filmfare Awards South	16 June 2018	Best Film – Tamil	Theeran Adhigaaram Ondru – Dream Warrior Pictures	Nominated	
Filmfare Awards South	16 June 2018	Best Director – Tamil	H. Vinoth	Nominated	
Filmfare Awards South	16 June 2018	Best Actor – Tamil	Karthi	Nominated	
Filmfare Awards South	16 June 2018	Critics Best Actor – Tamil	Karthi (Note: Shared with R. Madhavan for Vikram Vedha)	Won	
Filmfare Awards South	16 June 2018	Best Supporting Actor – Tamil	Abhimanyu Singh	Nominated	
South Indian International Movie Awards	14–15 September 2018	Best Film – Tamil	Theeran Adhigaaram Ondru – Dream Warrior Pictures	Nominated	
South Indian International Movie Awards	14–15 September 2018	Best Director – Tamil	H. Vinoth	Nominated	
South Indian International Movie Awards	14–15 September 2018	Best Actor – Tamil	Karthi	Nominated	
Techofes Awards	17 February 2018	Best Director	H. Vinoth	Won	
Vijay Awards	26 May 2018	Best Story	H. Vinoth	Won	
Vijay Awards	26 May 2018	Best Screenplay	H. Vinoth	Nominated	
Vijay Awards	26 May 2018	Best Cinematographer	Sathyan Sooryan	Nominated	
Vijay Awards	26 May 2018	Best Stunt Director	Dhilip Subbarayan	Won	

== Legacy and impact ==
Theeran Adhigaaram Ondru received praise from actors and directors from the Tamil film fraternity, including Karthi's brother Suriya, who watched the film at a special screening in Chennai and praised the team for making "a bold film with an impactful and realistic approach". Director Shankar also praised the film saying it as "a terrific cop film". Vijay too appreciated Vinoth's film-making style and authenticity after watching the film at a special screening in Chennai. The Hindu, The Indian Express, The New Indian Express and Firstpost ranked the film as one among the 'Best Tamil Films of 2017'. It was listed as the "Top 10 Indian Film" at IMDb along with Vikram Vedha and Baahubali 2: The Conclusion. Karthi said in the film's success meet, saying that "it tried him to work on new genres". In late-2019, Film Companion ranked the film as one of the '25 Greatest Tamil Films of the Decade' and Karthi's performance among '100 Greatest Performances of the Decade'. Sreedhar Pillai of Firstpost, stated that Theeran Adhigaaram Ondru and Thani Oruvan (2015), click among the general audience due to the realistic approach and stays true to the portrayal of Tamil Nadu Police in fiction, apart from mainstream Tamil films.

Contrarily, the film garnered criticism towards the negative stereotyping of tribal and nomadic communities, albeit the producers' explanation post-release. An article from Hindustan Times, written by Gayatri Jayaraman dated October 2018, highlighted how nomadic communities ended up bearing the brunt of fictional fear mongering, citing the examples of Adivasi youth being beaten to death by mob in Palakkad on February, and the killing of a 65-year-old woman at Tiruvannamalai; she said that the film "capitalised on this dissimilarity to stir the them-versus-us sentiment and to portray the outsiders as villains and thugs." In January 2023, Vinoth recalled that he felt guilty on the depiction of North Indians in the film, and this led him to sketch the protagonist in Valimai, where he was seen speaking against encounters and drugs.

== Sequel ==
Soon after the film's release, Karthi expressed his interest to Vinoth on developing a sequel for the film. On 17 November 2023, the sixth anniversary of the film, Vinoth confirmed that he had begun working on the sequel and is expected to begin production in early 2025 after Vinoth finishes his commitments on Jana Nayagan.
