= S. R. Jangid =

Director General of Police, Tamil Nadu

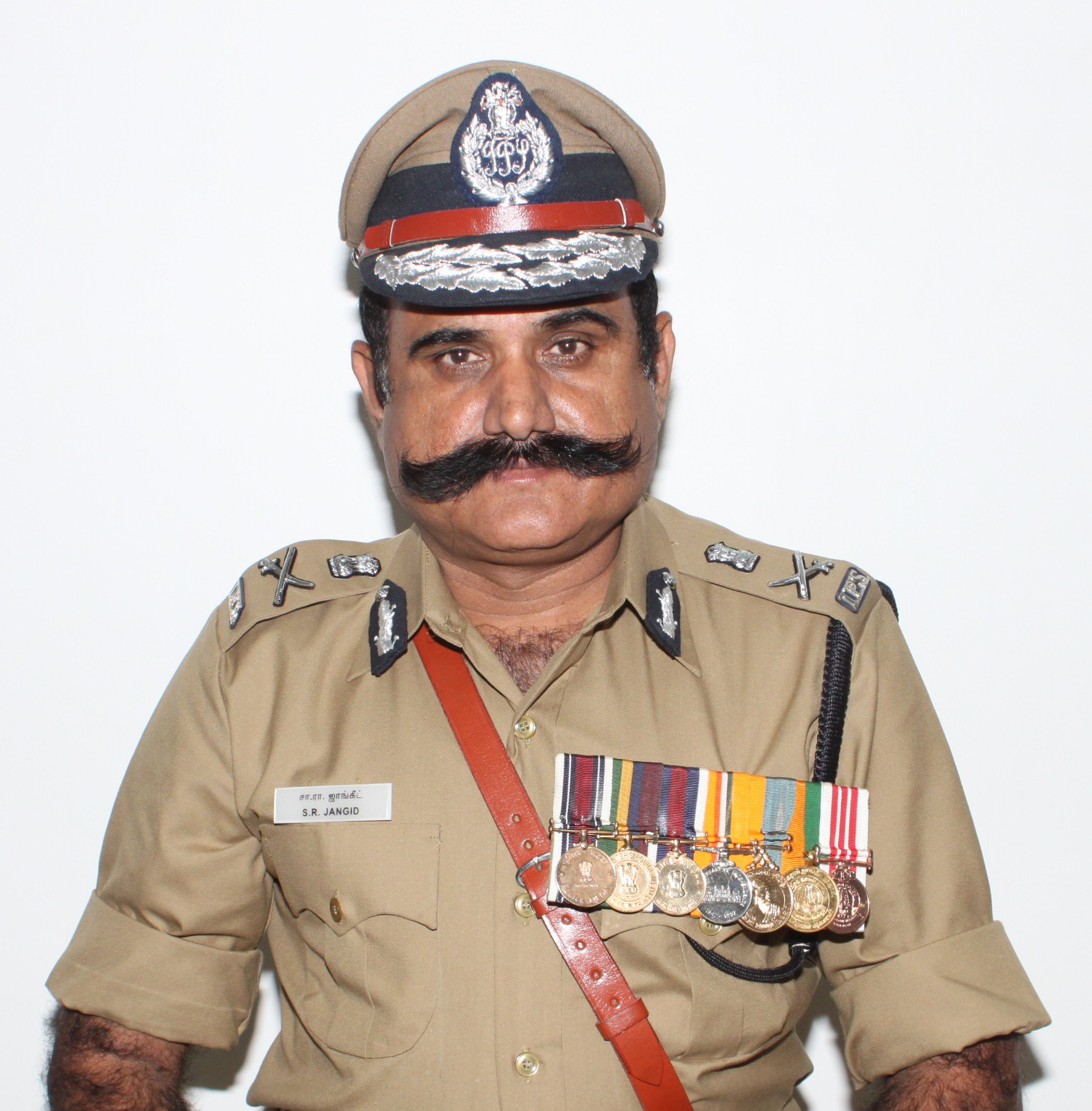
- Born: Barmer district, Rajasthan
- Education: Master of Arts (Economics)
- Alma mater: University of Rajasthan; University of Madras
- Known for: Operation Bawaria
- Awards: President's Police Medal

Sangaram Jangid, also known as S.R. Jangid, is a retired Indian police officer. He belonged to the 1985 batch of the Indian Police Service. He served as the Director General of Police in Tamil Nadu. He is known for leading the operations against the Bawaria robberies in the early 2000s. He was awarded the President's Police Medal for gallantry in 2008, and for distinguished service in 2011.

== Career ==
Jangid belonged to the 1985 batch of the Indian Police Service. He led the Tamil Nadu Police team that investigated the Bawaria robberies, a series of dacoity and murder incidents perpetrated in residential areas along various national highways in Tamil Nadu between 1995 and 2005. The organised dacoity carried out by a group of truck drivers from the Bawaria community killing 13 people, and injuring 63 others. The subsequent police operation led by Jangid resulted in the deaths of two, and the arrest of eight others including the leader of the gang Oma Bawaria. Jangid retired as the Director General of Police on 31 July 2019.

== Awards and honors ==
Jangid was awarded the President's Police Medal for gallantry in 2008, and for distinguished service in 2011. He received an honorary doctorate from University of Madras in 2023.

== In popular culture ==
In the 2017 Tamil film Theeran Adhigaaram Ondru directed by H. Vinoth, lead actor Karthi's role is based on Jangid.
