= Jana Nayagan =

2026 Indian film by H. Vinoth

- Theatrical release poster
- Directed by: H. Vinoth
- Screenplay by: H. Vinoth
- Story by: Anil Ravipudi
- Based on: Bhagavanth Kesari(2023) by Anil Ravipudi
- Produced by: Venkat K. Narayana
- Starring: Vijay; Bobby Deol; Pooja Hegde; Mamitha Baiju
- Cinematography: Sathyan Sooryan
- Edited by: Pradeep E. Ragav
- Music by: Anirudh Ravichander
- Production company: KVN Productions
- Distributed by: see below
- Release date: 23 July 2026
- Running time: 183 minutes
- Country: India
- Language: Tamil
- Budget: est. ₹300−500 crore (Note: Jana Nayagan's reported budget varies between ₹300 crore (The Financial Express) -₹300-500 crore (Free Press Journal) - ₹380 crore (Deccan Chronicle) – ₹400 crore (Cinema Express) – ₹500 crore (India Today, Hindustan Times, Outlook India, and The Economic Times))
- Box office: est. ₹311–325 crore (Note: Jana Nayagan's reported worldwide grosses vary between ₹311 crore (Box Office India – ₹320 crore (DNA India) – ₹320.34 crore (Deccan Chronicle) – ₹322.80 crore (The Telegraph) – ₹325 crore (News18 Malayalam))

Jana Nayagan (Tamil pronunciation: [dʑanaː n̪aːjagan]; transl. People's Hero) is a 2026 Indian Tamil-language political action drama film directed by H. Vinoth and produced by Venkat K. Narayana under KVN Productions. The film stars C. Joseph Vijay, Bobby Deol, Pooja Hegde, and Mamitha Baiju in the lead role alongside Nassar, Prakash Raj, Gautham Vasudev Menon, Narain, and Priyamani. A partial remake of the 2023 Telugu film Bhagavanth Kesari, it follows a former Tamil Nadu Police Inspector who raises the daughter of a deceased friend and encourages her to overcome childhood trauma and pursue a career in the Indian Army. His efforts draw him into a confrontation with corrupt individuals, whose actions threaten democratic institutions.

The film was officially announced in September 2024 under the tentative title Thalapathy 69, as it was Vijay's 69th film as a lead actor, and the official title was announced in January 2025. Principal photography commenced in October 2024 in Chennai, and the filming was wrapped by August 2025. It marked Vijay's final film appearance before he entered politics. The film has music composed by Anirudh Ravichander, cinematography by Sathyan Sooryan and editing by Pradeep E. Ragav.

Initially scheduled for release on 9 January 2026, the release of Jana Nayagan was postponed due to delays in obtaining clearance from the Central Board of Film Certification (CBFC). The film was leaked online on 9 April 2026 and was widely pirated and distributed illegally, leading to the producers to seek legal action against those responsible. After being cleared by the CBFC, it was released worldwide on 23 July 2026, two-and-a-half months after Vijay had assumed office as the Chief Minister of Tamil Nadu and received mixed reviews from critics, with praise for the cast performances and Anirudh's music while criticism was directed towards the use of AI-generated visuals and convoluted plot.Despite underperforming at the box-office due to the online leak, It set several box office records and grossed ₹320–325 crore worldwide emerging as the second highest-grossing Tamil film of 2026, and one of the highest-grossing Tamil film of all time.

== Plot ==
Vetri is released from prison after attracting the respect of jailer Srikanth. Before his death, Srikanth entrusts Vetri with the care of his daughter, Vijayalakshmi "Viji". Honouring the wishes of Srikanth and his late wife, Vetri raises Viji with the dream of seeing her become an officer in the Indian Army.

By 2026, Vetri has settled into a peaceful life as the owner of a supermarket. Viji is nearing the completion of her college education and is in a relationship with her classmate Karthik. She wishes to marry and lead a normal life instead of pursuing a military career. At the same time, she struggles with severe neurosis, making Vetri's ambitions for her increasingly difficult. Determined to fulfil her parents' dream, Vetri seeks the help of journalist Kayal to encourage Viji to join the Army despite her reluctance.

Meanwhile, in Swasnia, Africa, notorious international arms dealer John Himmler massacres an entire prison, cementing his reputation as one of the world's most feared criminals. He secretly oversees a mysterious operation known as Mission Meluha (MM). Around the same time, an Indian naval vessel is attacked by Himmler's forces, with the bodies of its officers washing ashore. Scientist Khaleel and his research team discover that the attackers employed an advanced technology called Remote Automation. Before Khaleel's team is eliminated, he escapes with crucial documents detailing the project. By coincidence, he entrusts them to Viji, asking her to deliver them to the Chief Minister, who is attending an event at her college.

As Vetri investigates the conspiracy with Kayal, he discovers that Viji's neurosis originated from a traumatic childhood incident in which she witnessed her mother's murder. A group of armed men had attacked their home in search of a teddy bear containing a concealed firearm. Further investigation reveals that Himmler had been secretly using his logistics company to smuggle weapons into India over a period of thirteen years as part of MM. Himmler's men eventually abduct Viji and attempt to kill her, but Vetri rescues her. Upon seeing Vetri, their shared past is revealed.

Past: Himmler, then Amrish Pujari, was an honest IPS topper serving as Deputy Commissioner of Police. He is publicly shamed by MLA Roja Rangaswamy, an incident that drives him into disillusionment and instability against the democratic system. Meanwhile, Vetri, a police inspector and leader of a rural hamlet, is transferred as punishment to Amrish's jurisdiction and executes Rangaswamy's goons, eventually arresting him. Vetri discovers that Amrish has embraced extremism after the humiliation. Believing democracy to be beyond redemption, Amrish plans to bomb a local school and incite large-scale religious violence to justify replacing the democratic government with a dictatorship. Vetri shoots Amrish to prevent the attack, believing he has killed him. However, Amrish survives, stages his own death, manipulates the investigation, and coerces his mother into testifying against Vetri, leading to Vetri's imprisonment. Amrish subsequently allies himself with Rangaswamy, adopts the identity of John Himmler, and spends the following years building MM.

Present: Inspired by Vetri's sacrifices and learning the truth about her parents, Viji overcomes her doubts and enrols in Army officer training, gradually gaining confidence and emotional resilience. Himmler's ultimate objective is eventually exposed. The weapons smuggled into India were intended for civilians, enabling him to orchestrate a nationwide religious conflict that would plunge the country into chaos and pave the way for authoritarian rule. Mission Meluha is revealed to consist of a vast army of remotely controlled combat robots capable of executing targets on command. After capturing Rangaswamy and extracting crucial intelligence, Vetri reunites with Khaleel and his scientific team to stop Himmler, who has taken the Chief Minister hostage. During the confrontation, Vetri and Viji infiltrate Himmler's stronghold. Using Khaleel's research, they trigger a Friendly Fire protocol that causes the robots to identify one another as hostile targets, resulting in their self-destruction. Having finally conquered her trauma, Viji fights alongside Vetri, and together they kill Himmler, bringing MM to an end.

== Cast ==
- Vijay as Ex-Inspector Thalapathy Vetri Kondan IPS
- Bobby Deol as Immortal John Himmler alias Ex-DCP Amrish Poojari IPS
- Pooja Hegde as Kayal
- Mamitha Baiju as Vijayalakshmi "Viji" Srikanth
  - Lithanya as Young Viji
- Nassar as Arivudai Nambi
- Prakash Raj as Roja Rangaswamy
- Gautham Vasudev Menon as Srikanth
- Narain as Khaleel
- Priyamani as Leela Rani
- Sunil as Velu
- Monisha Blessy as Vaishali
- Baba Bhaskar as Vetri's assistant
- Teejay Arunasalam as Karthik
- Nizhalgal Ravi as Narayanan
- G. M. Sundar as Loganathan
- Revathi as Vetri's mother
- Irfan Zaini as Salman
- Raichal Rabecca as Porkodi
- Ramachandran Durairaj as Vetri's assistant
- Balaji Sakthivel as a doctor
- A. L. Azhagappan as chief minister
- Jason Shah as Himmler's friend and partner
- Vinod Sagar as a goon
- Vijay Tamilan Parthiban as a minister
- Anjena Kirti as a journalist
- Ravi Raghavendra as a press reporter
- Arun Kumar Rajan as Viji's military trainer
- Vettai Muthukumar as Ramesh Babu
- Gajaraj as Karthik's father
- Sandeep Raviraj as Rangaswamy's son
- Madan Gowri as Ved, Khaleel's assistant
- Kumar Natarajan as Vetri's friend
- Mukhtar Khan as an Army Officer
- Bharat Raj as thug working for Himmler

=== Cameo appearances ===
- Anirudh Ravichander as himself in the song "Thalapathy Kacheri"
- Lokesh Kanagaraj as a reporter
- Atlee as a reporter
- Nelson Dilipkumar as a reporter
- Sekhar as himself in the song "Thalapathy Kacheri"
- Venkat K. Narayana as himself in the song "Thalapathy Kacheri"
- A. Srinath as Ilyas
- Sriman as DGP Yuvaraj
- N. Anand as a common man
- Sukhwinder Singh Grewal as thug attacking forest villagers
- K. G. Arunraj in the song "Oru Pere Varalaaru"
- S. R. Jangid as an intelligence officer

== Production ==
=== Development ===
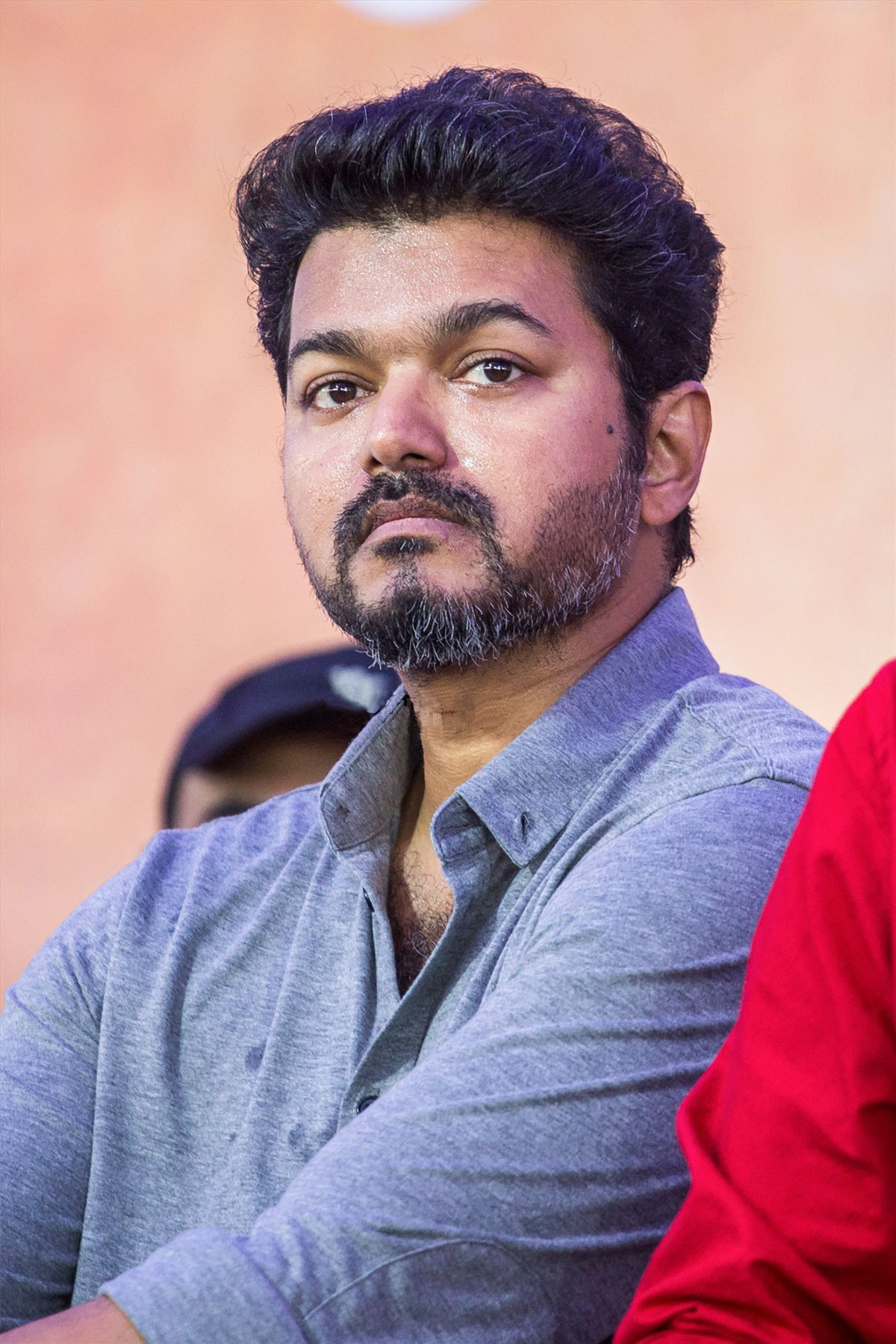
Jana Nayagan is the final film of C. Joseph Vijay and the only collaboration between the actor and H. Vinoth.

On 2 February 2024, C. Joseph Vijay announced through his social media accounts that he would step into politics after completing his ongoing projects, The Greatest of All Time (2024) and another film tentatively titled Thalapathy 69. The Times of India suggested Karthik Subbaraj would direct the project, with Sun Pictures producing, while Pinkvilla noted the director was not finalised, naming Anil Ravipudi, H. Vinoth, Subbaraj or Atlee as potential choices. Later, Vetrimaaran emerged as a possibility, with the project reportedly being funded by D. V. V. Danayya's DVV Entertainment. However, in March, Vetrimaaran confirmed he was not involved, narrowing the options to Trivikram and Vinoth. Reports soon suggested Vinoth was likely to direct. Director RJ Balaji revealed Vijay had considered scripts from 15 to 20 directors, including himself, for the project.

While working on Theeran Adhigaaram Ondru and Mersal (both 2017) respectively, Vinoth had narrated a script to Vijay, who declined. Vinoth later approached Kamal Haasan, who was impressed and signed him for his 233rd film. However, the project was shelved due to delays in Haasan's Indian 2 (2024). Vinoth revisited Vijay with the script, who reportedly accepted a ₹2.5 billion (US$27 million)–₹2.75 billion (US$29 million) deal, making him the highest-paid Indian actor, surpassing Shah Rukh Khan and Rajinikanth. In August, Vinoth confirmed his role as director, receiving ₹150 to 200 million, with Venkat K. Narayana's KVN Productions funding the project in their first Tamil venture. Vijay's manager, Jagadish Palanisamy, and Lohith N. K. serve as co-producers. The film was made on a ₹300-500 crore budget. The project was set to be announced on 22 June, Vijay's birthday, with shooting commencing from the following month, but was postponed at the actor's request. The company made a public announcement on 14 September, confirming the project, and the official title Jana Nayagan was announced on 26 January 2025, Republic Day.

Following the release of its trailer in January 2026, Jana Nayagan sparked online speculation that it may be inspired by or a remake of the 2023 Telugu film Bhagavanth Kesari, with many viewers noting perceived similarities between the two films. The following week, Bhagavanth Kesari producer Sahu Garapati confirmed to The New Indian Express that Jana Nayagan is a remake, and that writer-director Anil Ravipudi would receive credit. Reportedly, KVN Productions purchased the rights specifically for a scene regarding child abuse, which had a significant impact on Vijay. In January 2026, during an interview, Ravipudi revealed Vijay insisted he direct the Tamil remake, but he declined due to other plans. Ahead of the film's release in July, Vinoth acknowledged Jana Nayagan was only "50% of Bhagavanth Kesari", with substantial changes made to suit Vijay's image.

=== Pre-production ===
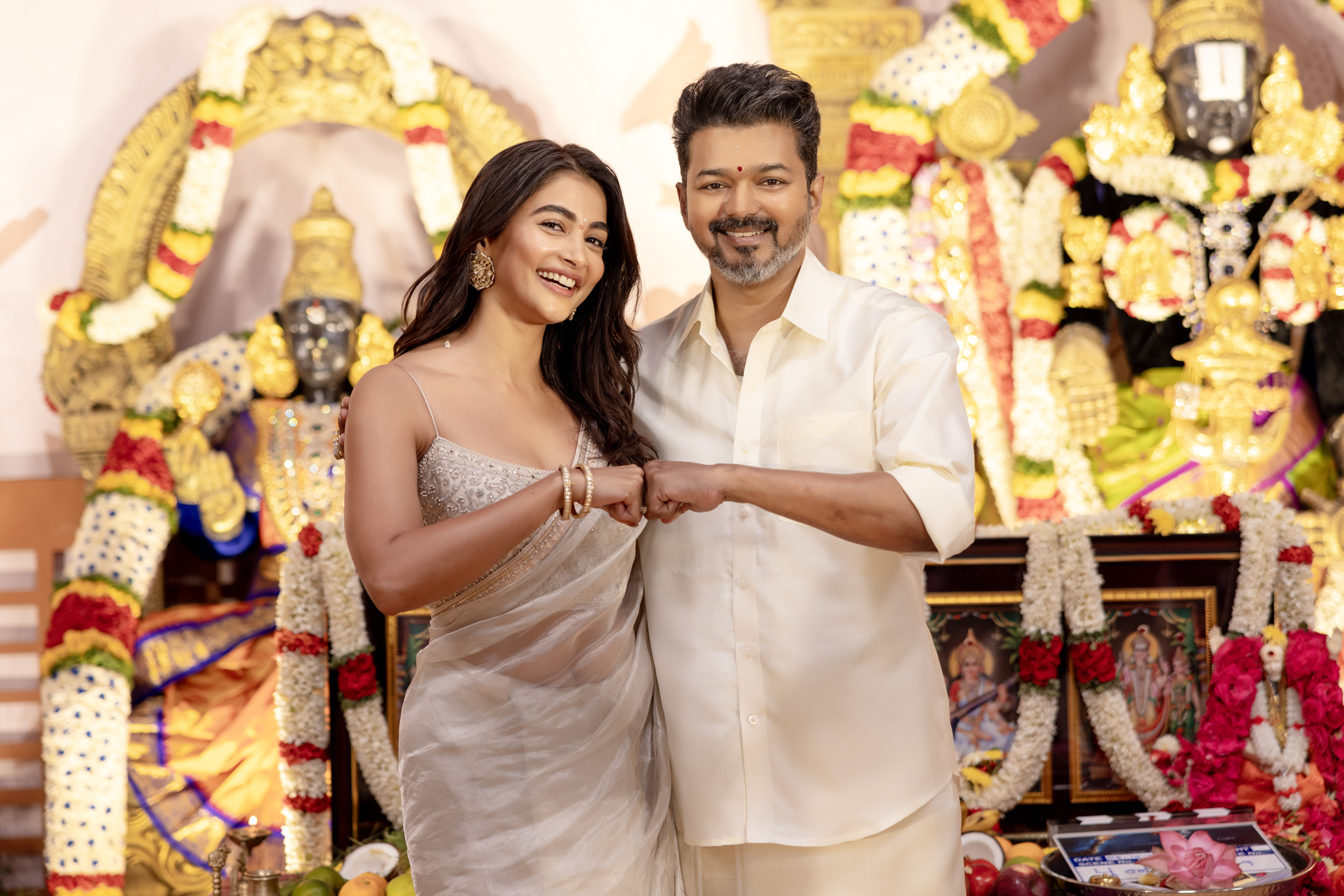
Vijay and Pooja Hegde at the film's muhurat puja

When Vinoth was committed to Haasan's 233rd film, he received changes from the actor which went to the final script and was narrated to Vijay. Although Vijay was highly impressed with the script, he had reportedly advised the director to make some changes. Vinoth said the film would be made completely in Vijay's style, unlike his previous films, which he considered to be political. However, the poster announcement of the film, which featured the tagline "torch bearer of democracy", made some media question the film's genre.

A muhurat puja was held on 4 October 2024, the second day of Navaratri, at Prime Studio in Chennai with the film's cast and crew. In early October 2024, Sathyan Sooryan was announced as the cinematographer, marking his second film with Vinoth after Theeran Adhigaaram Ondru (2017) and Vijay after Master (2021). Anirudh Ravichander would score the music, in his first collaboration with the director. Vinoth had further chosen technicians in his maiden collaboration, including editor Pradeep E. Ragav, stunt choreographer Anl Arasu, art director V. Selvakumar, costume designer Pallavi Singh and choreographer Sekhar VJ and Sudhan, while retaining publicity designer Gopi Prasannaa. Ramkumar Balasubramaniam was appointed as executive producer of the film by the production house.

=== Casting ===
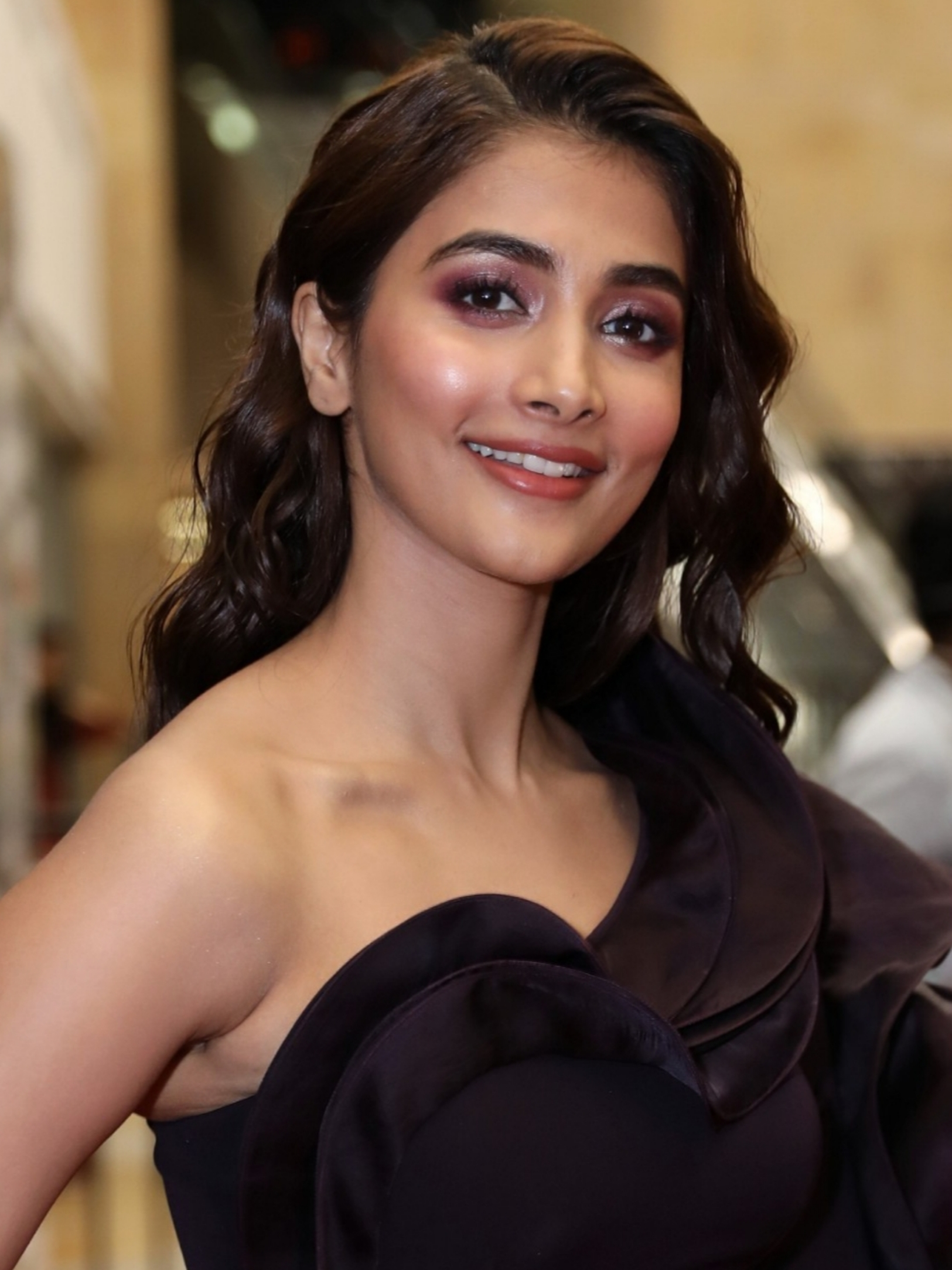
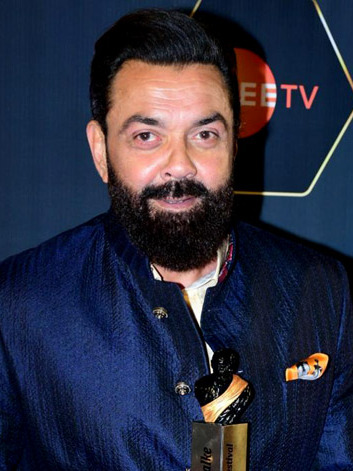
Pooja Hegde was cast as the female lead, reuniting with Vijay after Beast (2022). Bobby Deol would make his Tamil sophomore with the film.

Vijay had reportedly finalised his look for his character at a look test, which was reportedly in early–August at a studio in Chennai. Pooja Hegde was confirmed as the female lead, in her second collaboration with Vijay after Beast (2022) also marking her fourth Tamil film after Mugamoodi (2012), Beast and Retro (2025). She reportedly received a remuneration of ₹60 million (US$640,000). Hegde's statement after the formal launch, "Halamithi and Habibo Reunites", a reference to the first single from Beast, "Arabic Kuthu", went viral on social media. Hindi actor Bobby Deol was confirmed to play the main antagonist, in his second Tamil film following Kanguva (2024). Reports suggest he was paid a remuneration of ₹50 million (US$530,000).

Gautham Vasudev Menon, Narain, Priyamani and Prakash Raj would play prominent roles. Menon would make his second collaboration with Vijay after Leo (2023), while Raj would also collaborate with the actor for the seventh time, after namely working together in Ghilli (2004) and Varisu (2023). Malayalam actress Mamitha Baiju would make her Tamil sophomore after Rebel (2024) with this film. All of their inclusions were confirmed by the production house in early-October 2024. Monisha Blessy was featured in the muhurat puja, thereby confirming her inclusion. Teejay Arunasalam joined the film in a prominent role, while Reba Monica John was also cast in a prominent role. During the promotions of Bhairathi Ranagal (2024), Shiva Rajkumar stated he was approached by Vinoth for an important role, but the offer was later withdrawn for reasons unknown. Nizhalgal Ravi would be reuniting with Vijay in this film after namely working collaborating in Naan Sigappu Manithan (1985) and Kaavalan (2011). Revathi was reportedly cast to portray the role of Vijay's mother, reuniting with the latter after Thamizhan (2002). Srinath, television actor Arun Kumar Rajan, and Irfan Zaini were confirmed in the film. Srinath would make his fifth collaboration with Vijay, while Zaini would make his third collaboration. Atlee, Lokesh Kanagaraj and Nelson Dilipkumar would appear in cameo appearances.

=== Filming ===
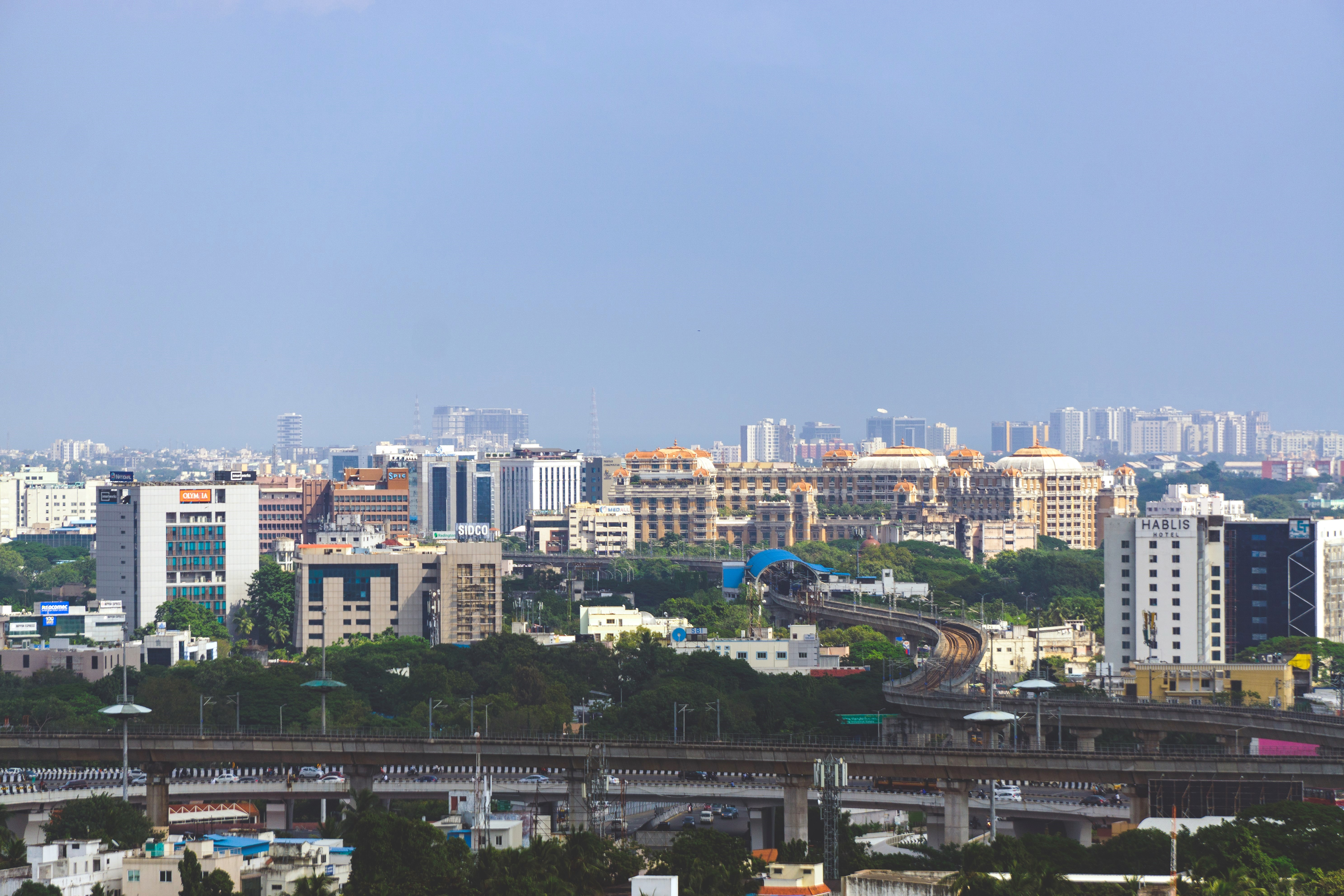
The first schedule took place in Chennai.

Principal photography began with the first schedule on 5 October 2024 at Prasad Studios in Chennai. Filming started with a song sequence, picturised on Vijay and Pooja featuring 500 background artists with choreography by Sekhar, at a massive set which was built prior to the filming's commencement, in September, under the supervision of V. Selvakumar. The song sequence completed filming on 10 October. After that, Vinoth reportedly completed some portions in 8 days, which were supposed to take 10 days. Initially, the second schedule was planned to take place in Hyderabad, but the production remained in Chennai at the request of Vijay. The team erected a huge set in Payanoor near Chennai for the second schedule. After Vijay completed his political commitments, the schedule commenced on 4 November. Vijay and Hegde joined the schedule in Chennai.

During this schedule, Vijay and Vinoth met with jawans and their families at the Officers Training Academy in Chennai. In mid November, shooting happened at AVIT, Vinayaka Mission Law College, Chennai. Later the production moved to Thiruporur, where a set was erected for action sequences. After a reported seven days of rehearsals in late November, production resumed at a constructed set in Chennai with an action sequence between Vijay and Deol, which lasted for three weeks. Hegde simultaneously filmed her portions in this schedule while filming her portions for Hai Jawani Toh Ishq Hona Hai, which were completed by 3 December. Vijay and Hegde resumed the shooting in mid December which reportedly went for a week. The second schedule was completed on 21 December at a beach in Chennai. Reportedly, 40% of the film's shooting was completed within the schedule.

The third schedule was reported to begin from second week of January 2025 after a short break for the New Year, but did not happen. The same month, Pinkvilla reported the makers were planning on completing filming by May 2025 so Vijay could focus on his political commitments. In late January, the production house stated that around 69% of the filming was completed. After the set work completion, the third schedule began in early-February 2025 in Chennai. During the schedule, Vijay met his fan Unnikannan on the sets who had walked from Kerala to meet the actor. Action sequences featuring Vijay, Deol and Prakash Raj was shot in this schedule. In mid-February 2025, shooting took place on the outskirts of Chennai. In late February, Vijay took a break from filming to focus on his political commitments. On 8 March 2025, Vijay uploaded a video from the sets, wishing women a happy International Women's Day. The same month, it was reported a sequence featuring directors Lokesh Kanagaraj, Nelson Dilipkumar and Atlee in cameo appearances was shot.

The next schedule began in late March at Chennai. In early-April, the filming took place in Tr Garden at Porur. Vijay completed filming his portions by 29 May. The producers were reported to have planned a farewell event for the actor after completing his portions; however, the actor declined, stating he would become too emotional. On 15 June, Hegde announced that she had completed filming her portions. In July 2025, it was reported the film was in the final stage of shooting. In late July 2025, shooting took place in Sivaganga and Erode. Principal photography wrapped by August 2025.

=== Post-production ===
Post-production of the film began simultaneously with the wrapping-up of filming in August 2025. The visual effects supervision for the film were provided by Monesh H, with Prasath Somasekar serving as the colourist under Knack Studios, which handled the digital intermediate of the film. Pradeep E. Ragav served as the film's editor. In December, Anirudh confirmed the BGM, final re-recording and mixing were in progress.

== Music ==
The soundtrack is composed by Anirudh Ravichander, in his fifth collaboration with Vijay after Kaththi (2014), Master (2021), Beast (2022) and Leo (2023); maiden with H. Vinoth. The audio rights were acquired by T-Series for ₹35 crore (US$3.7 million), highest for a Tamil film. It marks T-Series' third album with Anirudh after Jawan (2023) and Devara (2024), both non-Tamil language films.

Compositions for the film's music began in September 2024. Vijay was reported to sing one of the tracks in the album, his subsequent fifth collaboration with Anirudh as a singer, after "Selfie Pulla" from Kaththi, "Kutti Story" from Master, "Jolly O Gymkhana" from Beast and "Naa Ready" from Leo. The song would have rap written and performed by Asal Kolaar. Indian-American rapper Hanumankind confirmed in May 2025 that he has contributed a powerful song to the film. The first single "Thalapathy Kacheri" was released on 8 November 2025. The second single "Oru Pere Varalaaru" was released on 18 December 2025. It subsequently became the most-viewed Tamil song within 24 hours, garnering over 26 million views. The third single "Chella Magale" was released on 26 December 2025. The fourth single "Raavana Mavandaa" was released on 2 January 2026. The fifth single "Adiye En Poonthene" was released on 17 July 2026. The full album was released on 22 July 2026.

== Marketing ==
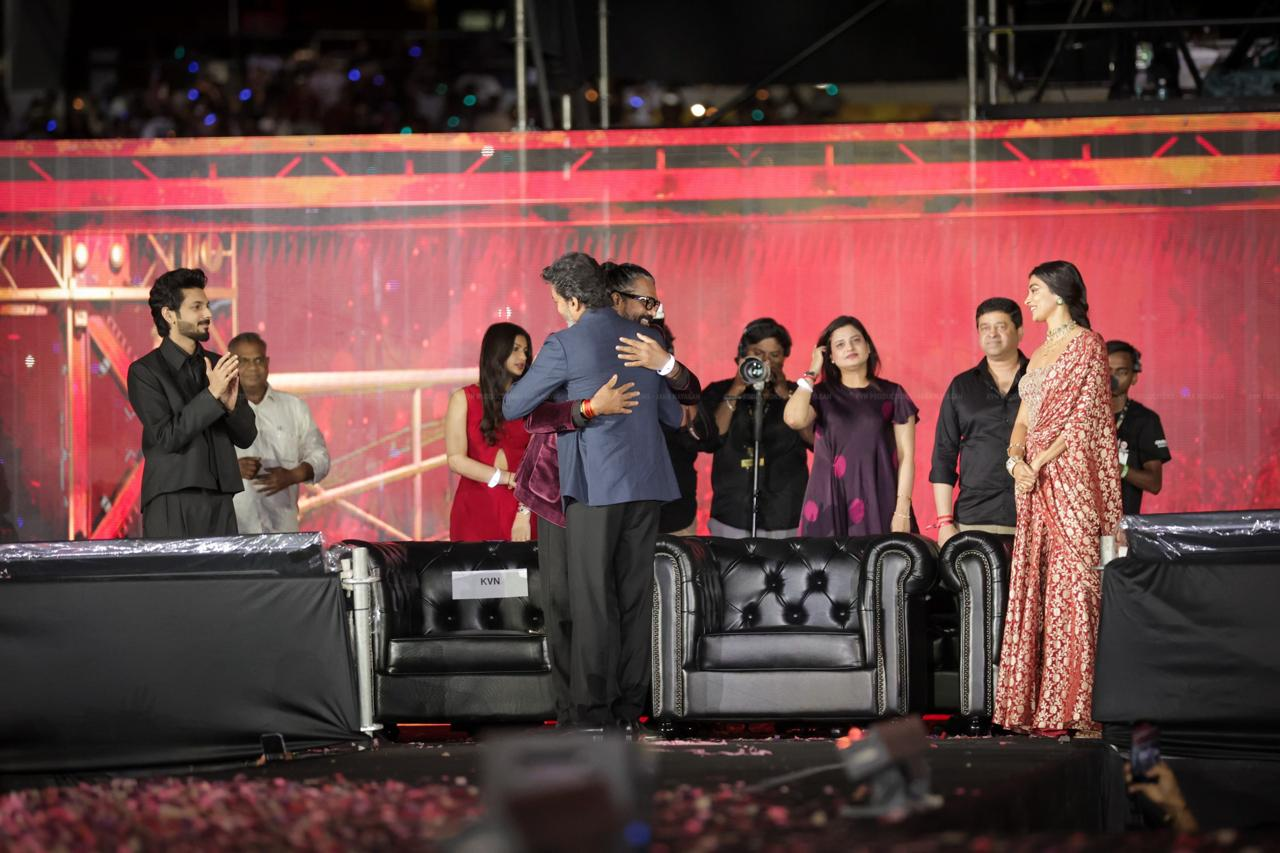
From left to right: Anirudh Ravichander, Venkat K. Narayana, Vijay, Pooja Hegde at Thalapathy Thiruvizha

The film's first look poster was released on 26 January 2025, revealing the film's title. The poster, which shows Vijay's character taking a selfie, was inspired by a real selfie that Vijay took in Neyveli during the production of Master in February 2020. Another poster released later the same day has him holding a whip, and the caption "Naan Aanai Ittaal", referencing the song from Enga Veettu Pillai (1965). On 24 March, the makers announced the film's postponement from the October 2025 release to the current release with a poster. A 65-second glimpse released on 22 June 2025, coinciding with Vijay's 51st birthday, became the most-viewed Tamil film glimpse in 24 hours, amassing over 32.4 million views. A critic from Bollywood Hungama noted "The teaser begins with Vijay's voiceover: “You guys will live in my heart," followed by a striking visual of him in police uniform, Katana in hand, walking through a war-ravaged landscape. The imagery, at once composed and intense, signals a farewell marked by gravity and grandeur." The same day, the makers announced the Telugu dubbed version Jana Nayakudu. In July 2025, the official Wimbledon Championships social media account honoured men's singles champion Jannik Sinner with a post inspired by Jana Nayagan's first look.

The film's audio launch event took place at Bukit Jalil National Stadium in Kuala Lumpur, Malaysia on 27 December 2025. The event titled "Thalapathy Thiruvizha" was described as a massive celebration and a tribute concert, featured live performances by Anirudh Ravichander and several prominent singers, including Anuradha Sriram, S. P. Charan, Tippu, Shweta Mohan, Andrea Jeremiah, Krish, Saindhavi, Yogi B–Natchatra, and others. Anirudh teased a special medley honouring his past collaborations with Vijay, making the event a significant milestone as Vijay's likely final audio launch before retiring from acting. The venue hosted a record-breaking crowd, with over 100,000 attendees, entering The Malaysia Book of Records for the highest number of attendees at a event in Malaysia. The film's trailer was released on 3 January 2026, and gained over 5 million views within 5 minutes. The trailer became the most watched Tamil film trailer in 24 hours with over 83.7 million views across three languages.

== Release ==
=== Pre-release ===
Jana Nayagan was originally scheduled for release in October 2025, but was delayed to 9 January 2026 to allow more time for production to be completed, followed by another delay due to a censorship issue. Apart from its original Tamil language, it is also scheduled to be released in Telugu, Hindi, Kannada and Malayalam languages. The dubbed Telugu version is titled Jana Nayakudu, while the Hindi version is titled Jan Neta.

Although its release was pushed to January 2026, Jana Nayagan was listed among several "Most Anticipated Tamil Films of 2025" by The Indian Express, Cinema Express, OTT Play and The Times of India. Following the trailer's release, Jana Nayagan triggered widespread backlash as social media users and industry observers pointed out strong similarities to Bhagavanth Kesari. The controversy contradicted director H. Vinoth's earlier claim of originality and significantly dampened expectations surrounding the film.

NDTV and The Hindu reported a key question remains as to why Vijay is signing off with a remake when an original political drama or a full-fledged action film could have created a greater impact. Critics and audiences have highlighted that while Vijay's final film carries enormous expectations, choosing a remake may not fully capitalise on the opportunity to deliver a fresh, memorable story. The controversy over the film's similarities with Bhagavanth Kesari has already reduced some audience expectations, and given that Jana Nayagan is also expected to carry subtle political undertones, many feel an original narrative might have resonated more strongly.

In May 2026, ticket booking platforms BookMyShow and District by Zomato listed 19 June 2026 as the film's release date, prompting widespread speculation among fans, as the date falls three days before Vijay's 52nd birthday on 22 June; however, the producers had not officially confirmed the release date, and the CBFC certificate had still not been granted as of late May 2026. On 9 July the film was cleared for release on 24 July 2026; a week later, it was advanced by a day to 23 July.

=== Censorship issue ===
Although the producers, KVN Productions, submitted the film to the Central Board of Film Certification (CBFC) on 18 December 2025, a final certificate was not immediately issued despite the filmmakers reportedly agreeing to minor cuts and modifications. On 6 January 2026, the producers approached the Madras High Court, alleging that the certification was being unreasonably withheld and that the delay was causing massive financial strain. During the proceedings, it was revealed that while an initial examining committee had recommended a U/A certificate, CBFC chairperson Prasoon Joshi later referred the film to a Revising Committee following a complaint regarding the film's brief portrayal of religious sentiments and the armed forces in an objectionable manner. The producers asked the court how such a complaint could be raised when the film had not been publicly screened.

During the hearing on 7 January 2026, the producers noted the film was already cleared in 25 other countries, including a "15" rating from the British Board of Film Classification (BBFC). Justice P. T. Asha questioned the CBFC's transparency, noting that the board appeared to be reopening a settled matter based on a complaint that was already addressed during the initial edits. Despite the producers' plea regarding the financial impact of a delay, the court reserved its final order for the morning of 9 January 2026, the film's scheduled release day. On 9 January the Madras High Court directed the Central Board of Film Certification (CBFC) to grant a UA 16+ certificate to the film and warned that entertaining such complaints would "lead to a dangerous trend". However, the CBFC immediately appealed this ruling, leading a division bench to stay the certification until 21 January 2026. On 12 January 2026, KVN the production company, appealed to the Supreme Court against the Madras HC Division Bench order that stayed immediate certification and halted enforcement of Justice Asha's direction.

The censor delay sparked widespread condemnation from the film fraternity and political leaders. Tamil Nadu Chief Minister M. K. Stalin criticised the Union government over alleged delays in film certification, accusing it of politicising the CBFC. In a post on X, he compared the CBFC to central investigative agencies, claiming they were being used as political tools by the BJP-led government. Leader of the Opposition Rahul Gandhi supported the film on 13 January 2026, commenting on the I&B Ministry's actions as an "attack on Tamil culture" and stated Prime Minister Narendra Modi would "never succeed in suppressing the voice of the Tamil people". Actor-politician Kamal Haasan issued a strong statement on 10 January 2026, calling for a "principled relook" at certification processes. He argued that "freedom of expression should never be diminished by opacity" and demanded transparent, time-bound evaluations with "written, reasoned justifications" for every cut. Filmmaker Ram Gopal Varma took a broader stance, arguing the CBFC was "outdated" and its attempts to protect society by cutting film scenes were a "joke" in the digital age. Director Pa. Ranjith described the board's actions as "extremely deplorable", suggesting a personal "political vendetta" was at play and that the board had fallen into "wrong directions". Similarly, director Karthik Subbaraj called for industry-wide unity to "save cinema", criticising the strict and often "impossible" timeline rules imposed by the board. Congress leaders B. Manickam Tagore and Jothimani characterised the delay as an attack on freedom of expression. Several actors including Ravi Mohan, Silambarasan, Jiiva, Shanthanu Bhagyaraj, Sibiraj, Harish Kalyan and Jai extended their support towards the film. Actor Mansoor Ali Khan criticised the CBFC during a 29 January press meet, sarcastically asking if Jana Nayagan originally set for Pongal (January) would only be cleared by Bakrid due to the delays. He highlighted alleged double standards, questioning how The Kashmir Files and The Kerala Story 2 which he said included "religious overtones and propaganda" were cleared swiftly, while Jana Nayagan faced repeated hurdles despite producers agreeing to cuts. On 22 February, actor and general secretary Vishal stated that if the situation continues, more than 1,500 members of the Nadigar Sangam will soon go on strike against the CBFC; he expressed frustration over the board's opaque process, questioning how "just five members" could decide a film's fate and emphasising the need for collective action to protect artistic freedom.

Several fans expressed disappointment and concern that, as of that time, no official response was issued by actor-politician and president of the TVK party, Vijay, regarding the censorship issue.

On 15 January 2026, the Supreme Court of India declined to entertain Jana Nayagan producer's plea for CBFC clearance, directing them instead to pursue relief in the Madras High Court division bench. On 9 February 2026, KVN Production filed a plea to withdraw the writ petition against CBFC at the Madras High Court, and submitted the film to the Revising committee for the censor certification. After one month, on 9 March 2026, the film's scheduled screening before the Central Board of Film Certification (CBFC) Revising Committee was suddenly called off at the last minute after one of the committee members fell ill. On 9 July 2026, Jana Nayagan received an A certificate (adults only rating) from the CBFC, after agreeing to several visual changes and lines muted, with only 20 seconds cut. On 14 July 2026, Jana Nayagan was re-censored with 41 seconds of extra footage added. The UK release of Jana Nayagan had no cuts.

=== Piracy ===
A partial leak of the film, consisting of approximately five minutes of footage, appeared online on 9 April 2026. The material reportedly included segments such as the title sequence, the introduction, and portions of the climax. The production team took steps to have the clips removed from online sites. Subsequently, reports emerged that the full film had been made available on piracy websites in high-definition format. The Cyber Crime Wing of the Tamil Nadu Police registered a case and initiated an investigation into the incident. The complaint was filed by the production team. The Tamil Nadu Cyber Crime Wing has officially announced that they arrested three main accused, including a freelance assistant editor, for the data theft and online leak of the film. The Tamil Nadu Police have officially released a public statement to the press and general public regarding the arrests of the accused. Cast members Pooja Hegde and Mamitha Baiju expressed deep disturbance and calling the event a "disheartening and disappointing situation" that was "truly disappointing". Several actors from the South Indian film industry expressed concern over the reported unauthorised leak of the film and condemned the circulation of pirated content.

According to a report by Deccan Herald, TVK leader Aadhav Arjuna alleged Union Minister L. Murugan had used his influence over the CBFC in connection with the film's reported leak. These allegations were denied by BJP leader K. Annamalai, who rejected claims linking Murugan or the Bharatiya Janata Party to the incident. The CBFC has denied leaking the film.

The Madras High Court issued an ad-interim injunction restraining cable operators and internet service providers from broadcasting or enabling access to pirated copies of the film until 2 June 2026. After the film was cleared for release by the CBFC, the producers said modifications were made to differentiate it from the leaked version.

=== Alleged internal leak and political benefit ===
An opinion column in The Indian Express argued that claims of external political sabotage behind the Jana Nayagan leak were inconsistent and unconvincing, suggesting instead that such theories weakened themselves due to internal contradictions; rather than identifying a verified source, the article focused on the outcome of the incident, noting that the leak significantly amplified public attention and visibility for Vijay and his party, Tamilaga Vettri Kazhagam, potentially strengthening his political positioning by portraying him as a target of powerful interests ahead of elections, and thereby raising the possibility—without presenting direct evidence—that the primary beneficiary of the controversy could have been Vijay himself.

=== Distribution ===
==== Domestic ====
Four companies, Seven Screen Studio, Romeo Pictures, and V Creations, were reportedly in discussions for the Tamil Nadu distribution rights. KVN opted for area-wise distribution in Tamil Nadu. Coimbatore, North Arcot, South Arcot, Tirunelveli, and Kanyakumari region distribution rights were acquired by S Picture. Five Star Senthil will distribute the film in Madurai, Trichy and Salem districts. Chennai City distribution rights were acquired by Cinemakaaran. White Nights through Trident Arts will distribute the film in Chengalpattu district. Tamil Nadu theatrical rights alone were sold for ₹1.065 billion, highest ever for a film. The North India theatrical distribution rights were acquired by Zee Studios. PVR Inox Pictures will distribute the film in Andhra Pradesh and Telangana states. SSR Entertainment acquired distribution rights for Kerala state.

==== Overseas ====
The overseas distribution rights were sold to Phars Film for ₹780 million (US$8.3 million). Prime Media will distribute the film in United States of America. York Cinemas acquired distribution rights of Canada. Ahimsa Entertainment and Boleyn Cinema will distribute the film in United Kingdom. Malaysia distribution rights were acquired by Malik Streams. Distribution rights for Australia and New Zealand were acquired by Home Screen Entertainment. SAS Plaza acquired distribution rights for Singapore and Sri Lanka. Europe RFT Films in association with Lokah Entertainments acquired the rights for the Europe territories. Germany distribution rights were acquired by Getam Cineworld. Evening Show Entertainment will distribute the film in Baltic states and Commonwealth of Independent States. Kings Entertainment and M6 Entertainment will distribute the film in Georgia. The distribution rights for France were acquired by 180 Entertainment. Japan distribution rights were acquired by Space Box. Mingalar Cinemas will distribute the film in Myanmar. Maldives theatrical distribution rights were acquired by Haven Pictures. M Cine acquired distribution rights for Mauritius and Seychelles. Benni Vazhappillil will distribute the film in Indonesia. JTN Enterprise acquired distribution rights for Thailand. Hong Kong distribution rights were acquired by AA Technologies. Chandra Films acquired distribution rights for Philippines. Norway distribution rights were acquired by Puthiri Entertainment.

=== Pre-bookings ===
Pre-bookings started in the UK on 17 December 2025. Over 12,700 tickets were sold in 24 hours of pre-bookings with a collection of £130,000 (US$178,082.19), surpassing the record held by Leo (2023) which sold over 10,000 tickets in 24 hours. Within 72 hours, pre-bookings in the UK crossed £200,000 (US$273,972.6). Pre-bookings in the United States opened on 18 December, with shows selling out within minutes. Advance bookings in France for the opening day began on 26 December; the first show sold out within minutes, followed by the remaining shows within 30 minutes. Within few days, the premiere bookings for the film in the USA crossed US$350,000.

=== Home media ===
The film's post-theatrical release rights were acquired by Amazon Prime Video for ₹1.21 billion (US$13 million), the highest for a Tamil film. The streaming rights were sold for a record price in March 2025, despite the ongoing crashing in the Indian streaming market. The Hindi-dubbed version of the film will start streaming digitally only after its 8-week theatrical release. On 12 March 2026, Amazon Prime Video reportedly withdrew from the post-theatrical release of the film, citing delays related to certification by the CBFC.

The film began streaming on ZEE5 from 21 August 2026 in Tamil and dubbed versions of Telugu, Kannada and Malayalam languages, thus replacing Amazon Prime Video.

== Reception ==
=== Box office ===
In India, Jana Nayagan earned ₹80.28 crore (US$8.6 million) on its opening day, becoming the fourth highest-opening film of Vijay after Leo, Beast and The Greatest of All Time. By 29 July, the film's total box office had reached ₹220 crore (US$24 million). As of 6 August, the film's total box office has reached ₹300 crore (US$32 million). It grossed ₹320–325 crore emerging as one the highest-grossing Tamil film of 2026, and one of the highest-grossing Tamil film of all time.

=== Critical response ===
On the review aggregator website Rotten Tomatoes, 20% of 10 critics' reviews are positive, with an average rating of 3.2/10.

Latha Srinivasan from NDTV gave the film 3 stars out of 5, remarking that Vijay dominated every frame he appeared in and his screen presence remained the film's biggest strength. Reviewing the Hindi version Jan Neta, Bollywood Hungama similarly gave the film 3 stars out of 5, remarking that while the plot was cliched and routine, the screenplay was captivating and peppered with several moments that would appeal to the masses, even though the film suffered from weak visual effects, the villain's difficult-to-digest backstory and the poor quality AI-generated Swasnia scenes. M. Suganth from The Times of India gave the film 2.5 stars out of 5, and wrote that while Vijay held it all together, he deserved a better farewell vehicle, as episodes meant as callbacks to real-life issues were poorly executed and put together in a slapdash fashion that one stopped caring about the characters, and the climax, featuring remote-controlled warfare and social media-amplified hate campaigns happening overnight, was "hardly believable". Janani K from India Today gave the film 2 stars out of 5 and felt that it could not decide what it wanted to be – an emotional goodbye to an actor or a rousing welcome to the Chief Minister. Saisuresh Sivaswamy from Rediff.com gave the film 2 stars out of 5 and called it Vijay's "most political film ever", remarking that many characters were criminally wasted and recommending Vijay to focus on sequels to Leo or The Greatest of All Time instead of picking another political theme, if he does continue to act.

Kaushik Rajaraman from DT Next gave the film 2 stars out of 5, calling it an extension of Vijay's political campaigns with innuendos on his political opponents, and not visually enchanting either due to being mostly shot on green mat and studios. Neeshita Nyayapati from Hindustan Times gave the film 2 stars out of 5, writing that while Vinoth did enough to pepper the film with Vijay-isms that kept the fans happy, the VFX and CGI shots were weak, and the film's biggest drawback was an unbeatable force like Himmler appearing weak before Vetri, and his unintentionally funny backstory. Bhuvanesh Chandar from The Hindu felt the film was a crowd-pleasing and engaging masala entertainer, while highlighting that the screenplay, as a result of impatiently brushing through several events at breakneck speed, lost much of the necessary emotional heft needed to anchor the story. Yashaswini Sri from Indian Express gave the film 1.5 stars out of 5, feeling it squandered the chance to give Vijay the farewell he deserved, due to poor VFX, unfinished AI-generated visuals, uneven editing and its crooked political message delivered with the subtlety of a campaign rally. Sajin Shrijith from The Week also gave the film 1.5 stars out of 5, finding it "an exhausting three-hour political campaign masquerading as a wannabe Shankar movie" that attempted to blend multiple social messages and political commentary with entertainment, but ultimately fell short due to its excessive length and lack of focus. Nikhil Waiker from Deccan Herald gave the film 1 star out of 5, complaining that its protagonist's infallibility rendered the film a "bad masala flick" and an even worse hero's journey, and further criticising the hollow script, lack of meaningful screen time for anyone else, the flimsy writing, and the mind-numbing focus on Vijay's action. Simon Abrams from RogerEbert.com also gave a highly negative review, criticising the film for heavily relying on AI animation and calling it an oppressive, overlong experience that leaned into the filmmakers' worst structural and visual ideas.

== Financial loss ==
The unauthorised reference edit was leaked online before the official release and was reported to have significant financial implications for its producers and distributors. Tamil Nadu film distributor Tirupur Subramaniam estimated the leak could result in losses ranging between ₹300 crore and ₹400 crore, citing the rapid escalation from partial footage leaks to the circulation of the full film online. The piracy incident was expected to adversely affect multiple revenue streams, including theatrical box office collections, as well as satellite and OTT rights. Reports also indicated a previously negotiated OTT deal, valued at over 120 crore, was withdrawn following the leak, further compounding the financial setback. Additionally, the leak weakened the producers’ bargaining power in distribution markets, with some stakeholders reassessing or withdrawing agreements due to concerns over reduced audience turnout and diminished commercial value. Overall, the incident was described as a major disruption to the film's revenue prospects and a significant setback for the Tamil film industry.

== Production challenges ==
In 2026, reports indicated KVN Productions was facing broader challenges across multiple large-scale projects, including Jana Nayagan. According to an industry insider cited by ETV Bharat, several of the company's films, such as Toxic and KD: The Devil, were encountering production and release-related hurdles. The report suggested factors such as scheduling pressures, large-scale production demands, and external controversies affecting individual projects contributed to delays and uncertainty around releases. These developments coincided with separate issues affecting Jana Nayagan, including certification delays, legal proceedings, and a high-profile piracy leak, which further impacted the film's release timeline.
