= Valimai =

2022 Indian film by H. Vinoth

- Theatrical release poster
- Directed by: H. Vinoth
- Written by: H. Vinoth
- Produced by: Boney Kapoor
- Starring: Ajith Kumar; Karthikeya; Huma Qureshi; Gurbani Judge
- Cinematography: Nirav Shah
- Edited by: Vijay Velukutty
- Music by: Songs: Yuvan Shankar Raja; Background Score: Ghibran
- Production companies: Zee Studios; Bayview Projects LLP
- Distributed by: Zee Studios; Romeo Pictures; Gopuram Cinemas
- Release date: 24 February 2022
- Running time: 178 minutes 167 minutes (edited version)
- Country: India
- Language: Tamil
- Budget: ₹150 crore
- Box office: est. ₹163.2–234 crore (Note: News18 and Dainik Jagran both published that the film made ₹163.2 crore worldwide in its lifetime. The Times of India reported that the film grossed ₹234 crore worldwide.)

Valimai (transl. Strength) is a 2022 Indian Tamil-language action thriller film written and directed by H. Vinoth. It is produced by Boney Kapoor under Bayview Projects LLP in association with Zee Studios, as co-producer and distributor. The film stars Ajith Kumar, Karthikeya, Huma Qureshi and Gurbani Judge. The film score is composed by Ghibran and the songs are composed by Yuvan Shankar Raja. The cinematography is performed by Nirav Shah and the editing handled by Vijay Velukutty. It revolves around Arjun, a police officer, who is assigned to track down a group of outlaw bikers following their involvement in heinous crimes.

This film marked the second collaboration between Ajith, Vinoth and Kapoor after Nerkonda Paarvai (2019). Vinoth wrote the script in mid-2018, but Ajith initially declined it and asked him to work on it later. The idea was later pitched in January 2019 with Kapoor agreeing to fund the project and was officially launched in mid-October 2019, with its title. Principal photography began in December 2019 in Hyderabad and was completed in February 2021, irrespective of production being disrupted due to the COVID-19 pandemic. Major portions of the film were shot across Chennai and Hyderabad, in addition to a few sequences in Russia, which were filmed during late-August and early-September 2021.

The film was in the news for a long time, due to the persuasion of fans to launch an update regarding the project, leading to a campaign named #ValimaiUpdate, that influenced sports, politics and other events as well. It eventually led to being listed as one of the most-anticipated Tamil films according to trade circuits. After being delayed multiple times, due to the ongoing COVID-19 pandemic restrictions being enforced in India, the film was released worldwide on 24 February 2022 to mixed reviews from critics.

== Plot ==
In Chennai, a biker club called Satan's Slaves are involved in drug rackets, snatch theft and murders, which are headed by Naren/Wolfaranga. City Commissioner Vijayakumar assigns the case to Assistant Commissioner Arjun Kumar from Madurai, known for his peculiar way of handling justice; breaking one of the limbs of the convicted so that they never repeat their crimes, originating from the values instilled by his mother Lakshmi.

Arjun is the sole breadwinner in his family consisting of Lakshmi, alcoholic older brother Kothandam, his wife, a married younger sister and younger brother Ashok "Kutty", an unemployed graduate. Kutty is constantly looked down by his sisters-in-law, whose daughter he is in love with, for his unemployment. Collaborating with his partner and friend Sophia, Arjun finds the corpse of Naveen, a man in a hostel whose friend Chinna had betrayed the gang and supplied drugs to him. However, Naveen had burned the drugs and committed suicide by hanging, while Chinna had been killed by the biker gang upon learning of his betrayal. Arjun finds Naveen's helmet in his room and finds out that he was a snatch thief who used a stolen motorcycle purchased from an online black marketeer. Arjun and Sophia both figure out the sequence of crimes done by Satan's Slaves.

The bikes used in the crimes had been bought from the same platform using stolen mobile phones on the dark web and that all of these crimes are done by the same organization. After sending one of his colleagues posing as a mercenary to thugs retired from the drug peddling business to find out the kingpin, Arjun learns about Wolfranga and a chase ensues, where Arjun manages to apprehend him. To his shock, he finds out that Kutty had also been involved. En route to prison, gang members attack the convoy, kills the policemen, and help Wolfranga escape. Arjun tries to corner Wolfranga, but he is knocked by Kutty, who escapes with the members.

Arjun gets demoted from the case due to Kutty's involvement and the case is handed over to Deputy Commissioner Rajangam and Inspector General Arasu, both of whom are envious of Arjun. Unbeknownst to anyone, Rajangam and Arasu are moles to Wolfranga and do not pay heed to the case. Lakshmi refuses food and drink out of guilt of seeing Kutty going astray, prompting Arjun to take matters into his own hands and solve the case himself. With Sophia's help alongside a few trusted aides in the cybercrime department, Arjun captures one of the mules, interrogating him about the gang and how Kutty got into the dirty business. Kutty befriended Wolfranga after being humiliated by his sisters-in-law due to his unemployment and refused to let their daughter marry him. Wolfranga indoctrinates him, saying that family are selfish individuals whose affection is a trick to make their children serve them in their old age.

Wolfranga runs his business using unemployed outcasts who are motivated by "money buys everything" ideology. After fishing out abandoned, stolen motorcycles from a derelict quarry, Arjun is reassigned the case where he and Sophia plan to expose Rajangam and Arasu's involvement with Wolfranga to Vijayakumar. Wolfranga kidnaps Arjun's family, holds them hostage, and blackmails Arjun to steal a metric ton of seized cocaine from the treasury to release them. However, Wolfranga also tells Rajangam to kill Arjun, false flagging Kutty, and hand him the seized cocaine to be incinerated. Wolfranga gives an empty gun to Kutty and tells him to pretend to shoot Lakshmi in order to shake her selflessness while he actually loaded a single bullet inside, but upon realizing Lakshmi's love and her readiness to die for him, Kutty inadvertently shoots Wolfranga's girlfriend Sarah dead. Kutty reunites with his family but is badly beaten and taken hostage as well. Arjun successfully steals the cocaine, exposing and capturing Rajangam, Arasu, and the remaining mules. Arjun arrives at the hideout to kill Wolfranga. The team successfully hack Satan's Slaves' server and lures the bikers to the hideout. Upon arrival, the bikers are gathered and captured by the police.

At the police station, Arjun convinces the bikers to work hard and mentions the importance of the parents' love for them and the pleasures they sacrificed for their children, releasing them. The case is successfully closed, while Arjun and the police force are applauded by the public. Owing to their efforts, the police organize a program to rehabilitate youngsters from depression and drugs.

== Cast ==
- Ajith Kumar as ACP Arjun Kumar IPS
  - Jack Robinson as young Arjun Kumar
- Karthikeya as Naren a.k.a. Wolfranga
- Huma Qureshi as Sophia
- Bani J as Sara
- Sumithra as Lakshmi, Arjun's mother
  - Uma Shankari as young Lakshmi
- Raj Ayyappa as Ashok a.k.a. Kutty, Arjun's younger brother
- Dhruvan as Amith
- Achyuth Kumar as Kothandam, Arjun's drunkard older brother
- Sunaina Badam as Arjun's younger sister
- Selva as Vijayakumar, police commissioner
- Dinesh Prabhakar as DCP Rajangam
- G. M. Sundar as IG Arasu
- Vaishnavi Chaitanya as Ramya
- Pearle Maaney as Christina
- Chaitra Reddy as Latha
- Mahanadi Shankar as Parthasarathy
- Pavel Navageethan as Selvam
- Pugazh as Success Balu
- D. R. K. Kiran as Inspector Ahmed
- Ajith Nambiar
- Janaki Suresh
- Silmisham Siva
- Kravmaga Sreeram

Additionally, a portrait of late actor Jaishankar as Arjun's late father is also featured in the film.

== Production ==
=== Development ===
"This was the second script that I'd done, and it was for another hero. I had a different version of this story. It was not a cop story then. We see what's happening around us. We see youngsters and what kind of problems that they and their families are facing today. I have taken two such problems, which I felt need to be addressed. What if those problems happened to the hero's family? How would they face it? How does he, as the head of the family, tackle it? How his personal and professional lives get affected by this and how he overcomes this forms the plot".

— H. Vinoth, on the origin of Valimai.

Soon after the release of director H. Vinoth's second film Theeran Adhigaaram Ondru (2017), he approached actor Ajith Kumar. However, Ajith declined the project and asked the director to work on the Tamil remake of the 2016 Hindi film Pink titled as Nerkonda Paarvai. In January 2019, Boney Kapoor announced the second collaboration with Ajith Kumar and director Vinoth for another Tamil film, titled as Thala 60. Kapoor also stated that, the film will have racing sequences, suggesting that the movie would be an action thriller genre that uses the actor's passion for speed. It was reported that Vinoth had written the script with another actor in mind, and with Ajith's involvement, he had to make changes in the script. The film's production was expected to launch on 29 August 2019, But delayed.

A formal launch ceremony for the film was held on 18 October 2019, at the office of Kapoor's production house. The makers also announced the title of the film as Valimai. Yuvan Shankar Raja was hired as the film's music director, and Nirav Shah was confirmed as the cinematographer. Art director Thota Tharani was reported to join the film's technical crew, but was replaced by K. Kathir. Editor Vijay Velukutty and stunt choreographer Dhilip Subbarayan too were a part of the technical team. Sources claimed that Ajith would portray a police officer, which was later confirmed by Kapoor.

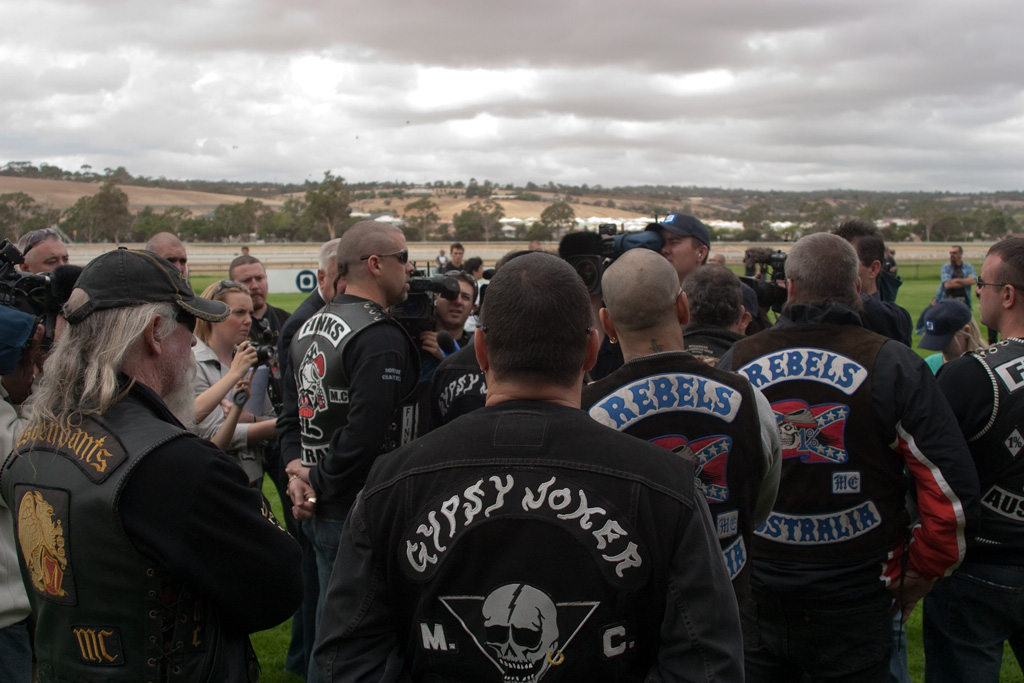
Valimai's storyline is based on the connection with outlaw motorcycle clubs, with the director used the history of these clubs, including the Satan's Slaves Motorcycle Club as a reference for this film.

On the release of the trailer glimpse on 23 September 2021, many cinephiles noted about the storyline revolving around the Satan's Slaves Motorcycle Club, which was founded in Shipley in the mid-1960s, and later spread on to various countries including Germany, North America, Scotland and Australia. Vinoth however revealed that the storyline will be loosely based on a group of outlaw motorcyclists involving in heinous crimes and how the protagonist tracks them down, hinting that the history behind Satan's Slaves Club gave its reference.

In an interview with Ananda Vikatan, Vinoth stated that he had partially re-written the script before the resumption of the film's shooting, being halted due to the COVID-19 pandemic. He stated that some of the actors were hesitant to shoot during the pandemic and the location owners denied permission to shoot on the sets that were constructed in the pre-pandemic times. As a result, he had to re-write the story and change the location and setting, due to practical difficulties.

=== Casting ===
In an interview with Gopinath Rajendran of Cinema Express, Vinoth had stated that Ajith's character is modelled on a real life racer-turned-police officer. He said, "When Jayalalithaa ma'am was the Chief Minister, a bike racer was made an SI directly. We have taken that as an inspiration for this character, who is an ex-racing professional turned cop". The makers reportedly approached Janhvi Kapoor and Parineeti Chopra to play the female lead, thus marking their debuts in South Indian cinema, and both actresses declined due to call sheet issues. While there had been questions surrounding over the film's female lead, with Ileana D'Cruz and Yami Gautam reportedly under consideration, Huma Qureshi was cast as a lead, in her second Tamil film after the Rajinikanth-starrer Kaala (2018). She portrays Ajith's friend in the film and there were no romantic scenes with the lead actor, due to the scripting changes made by Vinoth.

Bollywood actor Ajay Devgn was reported to play the antagonist, and could not act in the film due to his commitments to RRR. Arvind Swamy also reportedly refused to be part of the film, since he was then shooting for Thalaivii. Prasanna was also approached to play a pivotal role in Valimai, but declined the offer. In late 2019, Telugu actor Kartikeya Gummakonda was speculated as the antagonist, making Valimai his Tamil debut, and was confirmed only a year later. Vinoth stated that the antagonist is "a strong character who believes in his ideology". Apart from Kartikeya, two other antagonists, were reported to be featured in the film, with Pavel Navageethan of V1: Murder Case (2019) fame, and Malayalam actor Dhruvan reportedly playing the respective roles. In October 2021, Vinoth said that Malayalam actor Tovino Thomas was the initial choice for the antagonist before Kartikeya was finalised.

Raj Ayyappa who played the antagonist in 100, plays Ajith Kumar's brother in the film. A leaked picture of the film in December 2020, features Achyuth Kumar and Sumithra in the film's cast, The latter was reported to play Ajith Kumar's mother in the film, which the makers stated her character as a crucial one in the film. Popular television actor Pugazh was reported to play a pivotal role in the film. G. M. Sundar, Selva, television actress Chaitra Reddy (in her film debut), Pearle Maaney (in her Tamil debut) and Dinesh Prabhakar, were other actors who appear in supporting roles in the film.

=== Filming ===
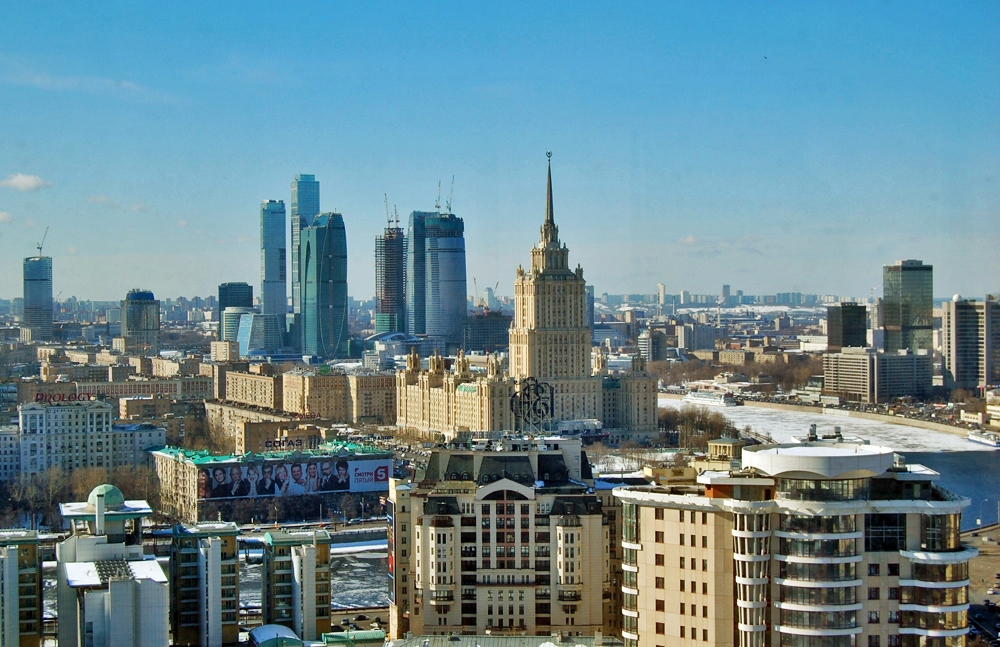
The bike chasing scenes for the film was filmed in Russia.

Principal photography of Valimai was expected to begin on 13 December 2019, but the shooting was launched two days earlier at the Ramoji Film City in Hyderabad. The makers filmed an action sequence for Ajith in Hyderabad, which was completed within two weeks. Soon after the completion, the team planned for a three-day shooting schedule, at Rekha Gardens in Chennai, and parts of the city. It was reported that, Ajith met with an accident during the filming of a bike sequence before completing the schedule in Chennai, which resulted in the film's delay. Filming was reportedly halted in March 2020 due to the pandemic, where, the team planned to shoot few sequences, which include car and motor race at Switzerland, within April 2020, and also planned to shoot in Spain and Morocco, after the COVID-19 lockdown in India. However, the pandemic affected the foreign shooting schedules, which made the team to make major changes in the shooting plan, with the planned foreign schedules to be shot across India. The post-production works of the film did not happen after Ajith's request. Nearly 60% of the shoot completed before the lockdown imposed.

After multiple delays, the film's shooting resumed on 23 September 2020, with Kartikeya joining the shoot. Major portions of the film were shot at Red Hills in Chennai. The makers stated that, Ajith will join the film's shoot by January 2021 and planned to complete the shoot within February, as more than 50–60 days of shoot is pending, including the actor's portions which will be completed within 30 days. It was reported that a popular Hollywood stunt choreographer, was hired to direct the few action sequences, which will introduce a new-style stunt in Tamil cinema. In October 2020, the team planned to shoot few sequences at New Delhi, but after the government denied permission to shoot the film citing the pandemic, the makers chose Hyderabad as the shooting schedule.

Ajith joined the sets in Hyderabad, after which he resumed shooting on 25 October, despite reported that he will start the shoot in early 2021. In an interview with an online portal, H. Vinoth stated that the makers may not cancel the foreign schedule because the crucial scene involves more international stuntmen. In mid-November 2020, it was reported that Ajith may take a month-long break in order to start the next phase of the shoot in Hyderabad. After the shoot resumed, the makers filmed a stunt sequence with Ajith performing a bike stunt without a double; however the actor lost his balance while performing a stunt, and fell off the bike. Despite sustaining injuries, Ajith completed the schedule without delay. As of December 2020, the makers had completed 80% of the film's shoot and talkie portions, whereas the songs and stunt sequences were yet to be completed. It was further reported that the makers planned to film the major stunt sequences in foreign countries post lockdown relaxations, with a major schedule in South Africa and Spain, where high-octane bike stunts will be filmed in the country. The film's shooting was wrapped on 15 February 2021, barring the foreign schedule, which was filmed in Russia during 26 August 2021 and was completed on 2 September, thereby shooting of the film was wrapped.

Speaking to an interview before the release, producer Boney Kapoor said that the film has been shot within 150-working days, while several days have been lost due to COVID-19 lockdown and travel restrictions, thus taking more than one-and-a-half years. Out of this 80 days were utilised for the action sequences and for those, the team arranged 150 motorbikes and 15–20 cars, with 4 brand new models, for the schedule. Furthermore, they also had 25–30 bikes imported from Russia, after shooting being completed, the team sold the bikes for half price.

=== Post-production ===
Post-production works for the film began during mid-February 2021. Vijay Velukutty, who worked in films such as Sangu Chakkaram (2017) and Jackpot (2019), was announced as the editor in the same month. He edited several portions of the film, except for the foreign schedule, which was speculated to be included with the edit, once the said shooting gets completed. In the intermediate period, several actors completed dubbing for the film, including Ajith Kumar who dubbed for his portions in March 2021. The team also worked on the visual effects and supervision in order to get the film ready. With the foreign schedule held in Russia, being completed within September 2021, the team resumed activities on post-production. The team needed to edit the final cut of the film, due to the inclusion of that particular sequence, and more work on the visual effects, eventually delaying the release. Ajith Kumar asked Vinoth to show the rough output of the film to him when the final edit was ready. He initially watched the entire film after its release. But due to the actor's curiosity and excitement of the film, as it has many racing sequences, and also his profession as a racer, he decided to change his plans and was received a rough copy of the film by Vinoth.

Ghibran who has worked with Vinoth in his second directorial Theeran Adhigaaram Ondru, was reported to compose the film score. Sources reported that Vinoth and the production team were not impressed by the score that Yuvan had created for the film, which resulted him to opt out of the project, despite composing the songs. However, the film's sound engineer-audiographer M. R. Rajakrishnan, in an interview, claimed that Yuvan could not come to the final mixing of the score, in the last moment, which resulted in Ghibran's involvement to the project. Ghibran worked on the re-recording and final mixing of the film score with Rajakrishnan. Sachin Sudharakaran and Hariharan M. of Sync Cinema worked on the sound design of the film. In an interview to The New Indian Express, the duo expressed about the recording of motorcycles and superbikes. They felt that, "the actual bike might not sound optimal for the visual, and we would interchange the sounds to find the perfect match. Since it wasn't feasible to record the sound on the sets, we would record it separately. The makers' decision to retain the bikes even after the shoot came in handy for us [...] Recording a bike would also mean we would fit the mic on the rider as he rode it, and record the sounds of the engine and muffler separately."

The film was given a U/A certificate from the Central Board of Film Certification (CBFC). The Board had ordered 15 cuts for the film, including muting and removing excessive use of violence and profanity. The final cut had a running time of 179 minutes. Valimai was mixed in Auro 11.1 surround sound technology, becoming the second Tamil film to do so after Vishwaroopam (2013). The final mixing happened at Four Frames Sound Company on 10 February 2022, fourteen days before the film's theatrical release.

== Music ==
Ghibran composed the original score in his second collaboration with director H. Vinoth after Theeran Adhigaaram Ondru and his first collaboration with Ajith Kumar and producer Boney Kapoor, while Yuvan Shankar Raja composed the songs, in his second collaboration with Vinoth and Boney Kapoor after Nerkonda Paarvai (2019) and eighth collaboration with Ajith Kumar after Dheena, Billa, Aegan, Mankatha, Billa II, Arrambam and Nerkonda Paarvai. Ghibran's involvement in the film was kept under wraps until being revealed by an article in the Times of India By February 2020, Yuvan composed two tracks for the film. However, due to COVID-19 lockdown restrictions, the progress of the film's music album was put on hold. Work on the film's songs were completed by late-October, and recording of the tracks began during mid-December 2020 at composer A. R. Rahman's AM Studios in Chennai, with the studio's chief sound engineer S. Sivakumar worked on the film's audiography. The film's soundtrack has different set of songs, consisting of various genres. Lyrics for the songs were written by Vignesh Shivan, Thamarai and rapper-cum-lyricist Arivu.

On 2 August 2021, collaborating with Ajith's 30th anniversary in the film industry, the makers released the first single "Naanga Vera Maari" on the same night, and received response from critics. The track "Mother Song" was released as the second single on 5 December, and the third single from the album – an instrumental track titled "Whistle Theme" was released on 22 December. Sony Music India, which acquired the marketing rights of the album, released it on New Year's Day (1 January 2022) through Spotify, iTunes and YouTube Music. However, two of the tracks were taken down from the album, from the respective platforms, as the tracks revealed the plot of the film, before eventually being restored to the album, a day before the film's release.

== Marketing ==
Despite the film's title being announced in October 2019, there was no update regarding the film's first look. In April 2020, Boney Kapoor claimed that the team will not indulge in any promotional activities citing the pandemic, and also stated that the team will kickstart the promotions post-lockdown. However, there was no clarification about the film promotion or first look which prompted fans of Ajith Kumar to trend the hashtag #ValimaiUpdate on Twitter. Furthermore, the producer had confirmed that the first look will release only after the film's shooting being wrapped. Although few members of the production team claimed that the first look will release on the end of February 2021, some of the fans had prompted for the film's update at sporting and political events and other public venues, which left Ajith Kumar disappointed and asked his fans to remain patient till the team releases an update. Although the film's first look was scheduled for a release on the first week of March, the producer tweeted that the makers will unveil the first look on 1 May 2021, coinciding with Ajith's birthday. However, a week prior to the said date, on 23 April 2021, the makers postponed the release of the film's first look due to the surge in COVID-19 cases in India.

While the makers planning to launch the first look with release date, on 11 July 2021, without pre-announcement, the makers launched the first look and motion poster of the film. Apart from receiving positive response for fans praising Ajith's look in the film, the motion poster received more than 10 million views on YouTube, within 48 hours. However, it also fetched criticism as cinephiles apparently noticed that similar images from the poster are widely available on the internet, alleging that the makers have lifted random images from the internet and made it into a motion poster. Few netizens also stated that the motion poster did not meet its expectations. The making video of the film released on 14 December 2021, and was praised by fans and audiences.

Prior to the film's release, the marketing team branded the film's posters in hoardings and LED displays located at various transportation services such as bus stops, railways and also at the Chennai Metro's vestibule. Two pre-release events were held for the film. The first event to promote the film's Kannada version was held at Bangalore on 21 February 2022, and the second event to promote the film's Telugu version was held in Hyderabad, the following day. Few cast members, including Huma Qureshi and Kartikeya, travelled through several cities to promote the film. SIMCO, the Central Government's South Indian co-operative departmental store functioning in Vellore announced a bid for its share that consumers whom purchase grocery items worth ₹2,999, will receive complimentary tickets for the film amounted to ₹500 and might serve popcorn and cold drinks for free.

== Release ==
=== Theatrical ===
Valimai was initially scheduled to release in November 2020, coinciding the festival of Diwali. However, the film's shoot was suspended due to the pandemic, thus resulting in the delay of its release. Post-completion of shooting, the film was initially scheduled to be released within late-2021. In mid-September 2021, the producers tweeted that the film is postponed to Pongal in January 2022, thereby clashing with other big-budget films including RRR and Radhe Shyam. The Multiplex Association of India (TMAI), listed the release date as 14 January 2022, in their official press release; however, the production company officially announced that the film would be released on 13 January, a day before Pongal.

In December 2021, theatre owners and exhibitors in Tamil Nadu, planned to open shows to begin at 1:00 am in order to get more screenings, thereby enhancing the box office collection. The makers too persuaded the Government of Tamil Nadu regarding permission for benefit shows. A week before the release, the film was postponed indefinitely due to the increasing number of COVID-19 cases, fuelled by the SARS-CoV-2 Omicron variant, and the sudden restrictions imposed by the government to control the pandemic. In early February, It was confirmed that the film is now scheduled to be released on 24 February 2022. Apart from Tamil, the film will be released in dubbed versions of Hindi, Kannada and Telugu languages along with the original version. A planned release of a Malayalam dubbed version, was put on hold due to closure of theatres in Kerala, as a precautionary measure to control the rise of COVID-19 cases in Kerala. With theatres being reopened in Kerala during mid-February, after relaxations, the makers reinstated to release the Malayalam-dubbed version along with the original on 24 February.

Following the release, the film received criticism for its length. Responding to the criticism, the makers trimmed all versions by 12 minutes, except the Hindi version, which was shortened by 18 minutes. The edits came into effect by 25 February 2022.

=== Screenings and statistics ===
According to trade industry sources, Valimai was the first film to be released in over 1000 theatres across Tamil Nadu. Film financier G. N. Anbu Chezhiyan's Gopuram Films, which distributed the film in Madurai, had announced that Valimai will be released in all over 27 theatres across the district with 45-50 shows being allotted. This came as a response, due to Ajith's exponential growth of the fanbase in Madurai, and the response for the actor's previous films there. Four days before the release, on 20 February 2022, the makers started the state-wide advance bookings in Tamil Nadu, and saw tremendous response within few hours, according to trade exhibitors, with tickets being sold out within a day. The first show in Tamil Nadu is expected to begin at 4:00 am. Reports from News18 had anticipated that "Valimai is expected to shatter records" as it did not have any major release in the vicinity, and also expected the film might revive the Tamil film industry which was affected by the impact of the COVID-19 pandemic and bring a similar response to that of Master (2021).

"[Valimai is] not just an action film [...] It is a proper family entertainer that also talks about social issues. When I say family film, it is not about the issues that crop up within a family, but it deals with an issue that a family faces, how that results in a crime, and how the hero tries to stop that crime from wrecking his family. It is a film that one should watch with their family [...] Ajith sir told me, 'I feel proud to have done this film. I'm going to screen this film to my mom and dad, and my family, as I feel like a proud son after having made this film.' He has screened it for them, and it was only after seeing their response that our producer decided to release it in a big way in Hindi, Telugu and Kannada".

— H. Vinoth in an interview with Chennai Times about Valimai's screening.

Film exhibitor Tiruppur Subramanian had stated that "Valimai's release will definitely bring in a change. Just like we saw when Master came out in 2021, and after Doctor or Maanaadu in the wake of second wave restrictions ending. These kinds of big films are essential for drawing audiences back. Once they come, it'll become a routine to re-visit theatres like before". Boney Kapoor called Valimai as Ajith's first pan-Indian film in an interview with The Times of India-based critic M. Suganth, and said that "The film has family drama, fantastic action and also something for the audiences to take home. So, it has the potential to work everywhere. You can call this the beginning of a pan-India release for Ajith's films". Ajith held a special screening for his family, few days before the release, and followed by the positive response, the team decided for a pan-Indian release in Tamil, Hindi, Kannada and Telugu languages.

While Valimai is released in several theatres across Tamil Nadu, the film is expected to clash with Pawan Kalyan's Bheemla Nayak in Andhra Pradesh and Telangana, and Alia Bhatt's Gangubai Kathiawadi in North India, whose films releases a day later. IVY Productions, which acquired the distribution rights in Andhra Pradesh and Telangana, had stated that Valimai will be released in over 500 screens in these states. E4 Entertainment announced that Valimai will be released in over 200 theatres in Kerala and fan-shows will begin from 4:00 am. In overseas centres, the film will be screened at about 60 locations in Australia, 19 locations in New Zealand and 5 locations in Fiji. Hamsini Entertainment announced that premiere shows for the film will begin on 23 February 2022, and the film will be screened in over 400 theatres across 250 locations in United States. The film's pre-sale record in United States crossed $30-mark from 46 locations. The film is also scheduled to be screened at Grand Rex, France, which was considered as the world's largest cinema theatre. However, it was called off after the film's planned release in France was cancelled for unknown reasons. The advance bookings for the film, began in Japan, three weeks before the anticipated release. The film will be released in 42 locations across Saudi Arabia, which is touted to be the biggest release in the country, with early fan shows being held on 24 February 2022.

=== Pre-release business ===
The film made a business of about ₹300 crore (equivalent to ₹367 crore or US$38 million in 2026) before the release, with the inclusion of satellite, digital, audio and Hindi dubbing rights. The film's gross in pre-release deal was ₹300 crore (US$31 million), The Tamil Nadu theatrical rights were sold for ₹64.50 crore (US$6.7 million), Kerala and Karnataka theatrical rights were sold to ₹2.5 crore (US$260,000) and ₹4 crore (US$420,000) and Andhra and Telangana theatrical rights were sold jointly for ₹2.5 crore (US$260,000). The North India theatrical distribution and Hindi dubbing rights were purchased for ₹2.5 crore (US$260,000), and overseas rights were sold to ₹30 crore (US$3.1 million). The film made ₹96 crore (US$10 million) from theatrical rights, and ₹59 crore (US$6.1 million) from non-theatrical rights – satellite and digital rights were sold to ₹28 crore (US$2.9 million) and ₹31 crore (US$3.2 million), respectively.

=== Distribution ===
The theatrical rights of the film were acquired by Raahul of Romeo Pictures and film financier Anbu Chezhian's Gopuram Cinemas. Both the distributors acquired the rights in Chennai and Madurai. Subbaiyah Shanmugham of SSI Productions purchased the rights in the Coimbatore territory and Sri Kumaran Films acquiring the Salem theatrical rights. The theatrical rights in Chengalpet region were sold to Kalaimagan Mubarak of Skyman Films International for an undisclosed price. Rockfort Entertainment purchased the theatrical distribution rights in the Arcot region (North Arcot and South Arcot). The theatrical rights were sold to Sri Durgambigai Films in the Tiruchirappalli region, whilst MKRP Productions, a film production company owned by M. K. Ramprasad, purchased the rights in the Tirunelveli–Kanyakumari territories.

IVY Productions acquired the theatrical rights in the Andhra Pradesh and Telangana territories. E4 Entertainment purchased the theatrical rights in Kerala, whereas Kamar Film Factory had purchased the Karnataka distribution rights. Zee Studios holds the North India theatrical and Hindi-dubbing rights for the film. United India Exporters acquired the film's overseas distribution rights in December 2020. Cinemark and Hamsini Entertainment, holds the rights for theatrical distribution in United States and United Kingdom. Lotus Five Star purchased the theatrical rights in Malaysia and Singapore. Scandinavian Tamil Media Group AS purchased the rights in the Scandinavian territory, including countries such as Norway, Sweden and Denmark. Niraj Poudel of A Eight Films acquired the distribution rights in Nepal for an undisclosed price.

=== Home media ===
The entire rights of the film were owned by its co-producer and distributor Zee Studios, the production and distribution firm of Zee Entertainment Enterprises who sold the satellite rights to Zee Tamil and Zee Thirai, and the digital distribution rights to ZEE5 and its video-on-demand service Zee Plex. The makers planned for a digital premiere through Zee Plex, only after 35 days of its theatrical run being completed, and later premiere it on ZEE5. However, as Zee Enterprises decided to close down Zee Plex, as their films released through this model, did not fetch the required numbers expected resulting huge losses for the company; the makers decided to sell the post-theatrical streaming rights to ZEE5 in Tamil, Hindi, Telugu, Malayalam and Kannada languages, in which the film might have a 50-day window, between the theatrical and digital release.

== Reception ==
=== Critical response ===
Valimai opened to mixed reviews from critics but praised Ajith's performance.

M. Suganth of The Times of India gave the film a rating of 3/5 praising the stunts and performances and wrote "There are times it works (a scene in prison when he has to break someone's arm) and times when it doesn't (the monologue in the climax). But there is no denying that it is his presence that holds together this two distinct tones of the film." Janani K of India Today gave the film a rating of 3/5 and wrote "The action-thriller is a predictable story laced with brilliant action sequences". Pinkvilla gave the film a rating 3/5 and wrote "'Valimai' is for you if you like larger-than-life action blocks involving bike-bound men and their unflinching adventures".

Ashameera Aiyappan of Firstpost gave the film a rating of 2.5/5 and wrote "H Vinoth exchanges the grounded authenticity of his predecessor work for glitzy, gimmicky action which ends being a kitsch combination of sensibilities". Vivek M V of Deccan Herald gave the film a rating of 2.5/5 and wrote "Ajith is fine while Huma Qureshi has just one slick action scene to shine. The saving grace is the maniacal performance from Kartikeya Gummakonda". Manoj Kumar R of The Indian Express gave the film a rating of 2/5 and wrote "Vinoth's idea of creating an urban legend goes awry when the film fails to distinguish Ajith Kumar's offscreen persona from Ajith Kumar's character in Valimai". Umesh Punwani of Koimoi gave the film a rating of 2/5 and wrote "Watch this only for Ajith, because he won't disappoint even though the film might!". Sowmya Rajendran of The News Minute gave the film a rating of 2/5 and stated "The stunts are indeed valimai but the film becomes a kodumai with its wonky script and poor characterisation". Bollywood Hungama gave the film a rating of 2/5 and wrote "VALIMAI [Hindi] suffers from its long length and complicated narrative. The Hindi version might struggle at the BO".

Lakshmi Subramanian of The Week gave the film a rating of 2/5 and wrote "Every character in Valimai, including Huma and both the brothers feel like add-ons with no depth. The characters are either fully for the hero or completely against him.The second half is long and tiring with just bikes and bikers again. Besides this, Ajith's expressionless face adds to the misery". Scroll.in gave the film a rating of 2/5 and wrote "Except for a handful of pulsating action sequences and a villain who is nearly equal in capabilities to the hero, Valimai has trouble kicking into gear". Aditya Shrikrishna of The Quint gave the film a rating of 2/5 and wrote "Ajith Kumar's Film Is a Shoddily Produced Tepid Affair". Nishad Thaivalappil of News18 stated "Thala Ajith fans will love Valimai, but the film has little to offer to others in terms of a cinematic experience". Haricharan Pudipeddi of Hindustan Times stated "Ajith Kumar-starrer would've been a cracker of a film if it solely focused on providing action thrills". Srivatsan S of The Hindu stated "While 'Theeran Adhigaram Ondru' may have announced that H Vinoth could do action, 'Valimai' reaffirms our belief that Vinoth could perhaps be the best Indian filmmaker who knows how to write, choreograph and execute action sequences with a larger vision and purpose".

=== Box office ===
Valimai was expected to have very high collections at the box office.

Valimai had the highest opening day in Tamil Nadu at the time of its release according to Box Office India, or the second highest opening day behind Sarkar (2018), according to Bollywood Hungama. On its opening day, Bollywood Hungama said that the film grossed around ₹28 crore (US$2.9 million) to ₹32 crore (US$3.3 million) in Tamil Nadu.

In USA, the film beat Ajith's previous film Viswasam's lifetime USA gross by grossing $300k, becoming Ajith's fifth film to gross more than $300k in USA.

== Plagiarism allegations ==
In February 2023, nearly a year after the film's release, director Rajesh Raja accused Vinoth of lifting 10 scenes from the former's 2019 short film Thanga Sangili for Valimai. Due to his inability to reach Vinoth, Rajesh Raja approached the Commissioner of Chennai.

== Impact ==
The impact of Valimai, even before the release, has been noted by several cinephiles, with the hashtag #ValimaiUpdate becoming a trending topic on Twitter. Boney Kapoor noted the fan following of the actor in regard to this. In an interview with The Hindu, he said that though fans of Ajith had every right to ask for updates on the film, "I did not want to mislead them. I wanted to give out material only when there was something concrete at hand." This trend influenced celebrities from the film fraternity, sportspersons, politicians and media outlets. Ravichandran Ashwin shared the same in an online interaction, when he experienced a fan asking Moeen Ali and him, for an update regarding the film during the second test match, between India and England in Chennai. Politician Vanathi Srinivasan too said that after her win in the 2021 Tamil Nadu Legislative Assembly election, the fans might get the update about the film. #ValimaiUpdate campaign also influenced the elections, with Election Commission's Tamil Nadu wing advertising the title on the necessity to urge every individual to vote. In February 2022, the film crossed more than 2 million interests on the online-ticketing portal BookMyShow, beating records earlier set by Baahubali 2: The Conclusion (2017) and Avengers: Endgame (2019). Valimai was the second most tweeted film in India, according to a year-ender survey report released by Twitter in December 2021.

== Potential sequel ==
In an interview with Pinkvilla, Boney Kapoor expressed his plans on a sequel and more future instalments, so that the film would be developed into a franchise. He stated that the possibility for a sequel will be dependent on the audience response towards the film and the box-office performance.
