= Muhurat shot =

First shot of a film in Indian cinema

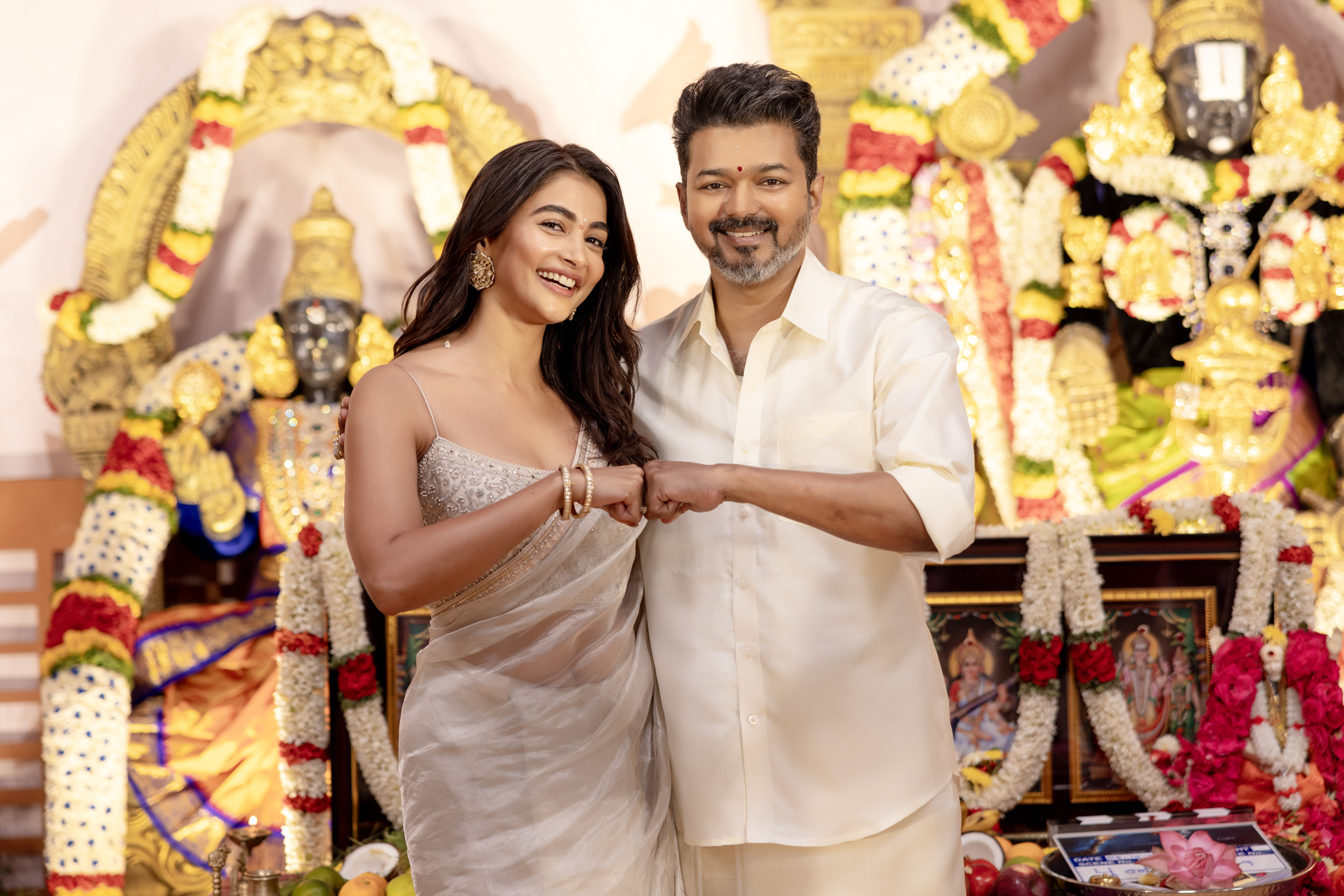
Pooja Hegde and Vijay at the Jana Nayagan film's muhurat puja in 2024

In the Indian film industry, the muhurat shot (also known as muhurtam shot) is the first shot (or take) of a film marking the commencement of the principal photography. It is preceded by a pooja (religious rites). Muhurta is a word from the Rigveda and means moment. Contemporarily it means "auspicious moment".

== Description in literature ==
A character in Shashi Tharoor's Show Business: A Novel muses, "The muhurat of any film, the auspicious moment when the opening shot is canned, is not an event its star is supposed to miss... Muhurats are packed with oversize individuals in undersize clothes, their eyes and thighs gleaming with synthetic sheen... their tendency is to drape refulgent garlands on every available tripod, clapper, or neck. I'm happy to avoid them. In any case, marigolds make me sneeze."

A Rediff.com news story covering the release of Bob Christo autobiography Flashback: My Life and Times in Bollywood and Beyond, carries an excerpt in which Christo asks "What is a mahurat [sic]", "That's an inauguration" he is told. According to director Suresh Krissna, "In an industry steeped in superstition, it is blasphemy to even think of not using the muhurat shot – the first shot has to be inserted at some point".
