= H. Vinoth =

Indian film director and screenwriter

H. Vinoth is an Indian film director and screenwriter who works in Tamil cinema. He made his directorial debut with Sathuranga Vettai (2014). He went on to direct the critically-acclaimed Theeran Adhigaaram Ondru (2017) along with Nerkonda Paarvai (2019), Valimai (2022), and Thunivu (2023), his trio of films starring Ajith Kumar which he is known for. He directed the final film for Vijay known as Jana Nayagan (2026) before entering into politics.

== Film career ==
Vinoth worked as an assistant director to R. Parthiepan and Vijay Milton, in Pachchak Kuthira and Goli Soda, respectively.

In 2014, Vinoth made his directorial debut with Sathuranga Vettai, produced by Manobala. The film was very well-received by both the critics and audience alike. It was said to be a "con film". He stated, "My film is about the pace at which we all want to make money in our lives. It is about the anger of the common man, who thinks money is the solution to all his problems. When there is an imbalance in nature, we experience tsunamis and earthquakes. Likewise, my story is about the imbalance in the social morals of a common man". Although it was a heist film, Vinoth said that he had made the film "as funny as possible" and that it had been narrated, was signed on as director.

In early 2016, Vinoth narrated a script to Karthi, who was very impressed and agreed to team up with him, after the release of Kaashmora and Kaatru Veliyidai. The film was titled Theeran Adhigaaram Ondru and produced by S. R. Prakashbabu and S. R. Prabhu, under Dream Warrior Pictures. The story was based on true events from Operation Bawaria, which involved the nefarious activity of dacoits and its eventual containment by Tamil Nadu police. Karthi and Rakul Preet Singh played the lead roles in the film, while Abhimanyu Singh played the prime antagonist. Upon release, it received highly positive reviews. Karthi's performance was highly acclaimed, for which, he received the Filmfare Critics Award for Best Actor – South and was nominated for the Filmfare Award for Best Actor – Tamil.

During the post-production of Theeran, Vinoth narrated a story of a conman to Ajith Kumar. However, Ajith rejected it, citing he had done similar movies, and suggested him to remake Pink, in Tamil. Ajith mentioned that he liked his style of writing and wanted him as the director, particularly. Initially, Vinoth was reluctant on doing a remake, but on Ajith's request and repeated viewings of the original, he accepted to do it under Boney Kapoor's production house, Bayview Projects. Kapoor, Vinoth, and Ajith entered into a two-film deal that started with Nerkonda Paarvai and a big-budget action thriller, Valimai. Nerkonda Paarvai released on 8 August 2019 and received positive reviews from critics. Valimai released in 2022 to mixed reviews but was still a box office success. In 2023, he directed his fifth film Thunivu, his third collaboration with Ajith and Kapoor. Like Valimai, it received mixed reviews but was a box office success. The film grossed over ₹200 crores.

In 2023, Vinoth was committed to direct Kamal Haasan's 233rd film, tentatively titled as KH233. However, the film was later shelved due to creative differences.

Vinoth directed Vijay's 69th and final film Jana Nayagan. Pooja Hegde is the heroine of the film, with Bobby Deol playing the main antagonist. It is partial remake of 2023 Telugu film Bhagavanth Kesari. The film was scheduled for release on 9 January 2026, but was delayed due to censorship issues. It was subsequently leaked on piracy websites on 9 April 2026, prior to its official theatrical release. Ultimately, Jana Nayagan opened in theatres on 23 July. Despite the leak and delays, the film went on to rank among the highest-grossing Tamil films of all time.

== Filmography ==
Year	Film	Notes
2014	Sathuranga Vettai	
2017	Theeran Adhigaaram Ondru	Based on Operation Bawaria incident Nominated - Filmfare Award for Best Director - Tamil
2019	Nerkonda Paarvai	Remake of Pink
2022	Valimai	
2023	Thunivu	
2026	Jana Nayagan	Partial remake of Bhagavanth Kesari
