= Babaria =

Nomadic tribe in India

The Bavari (alternate spellings of which include Bawaria, Babariya, Bawri and Baraiya) are a nomadic tribe found mainly in the Indian states of Haryana, Punjab, Rajasthan and Uttar Pradesh. This tribe natively speak bawari, which is a dialect of rajasthani language.

== Traditions ==
The rajput Bavari are traditionally a nomadic tribe and held a reputation as skilled trackers and hunters of animals large and small, the product of which they consumed themselves and sold to villagers. Their abilities were such that their services were used by royalty and nobility.

A survey of the Bavari in Rajasthan indicates two myths of origin. One is the claim of descent from a man called Dana, who lived near Nagarkot and whom they believe married a goddess over a millennium ago; they still worship that goddess, together with Kali, Shed Devi and Thakarji. Their other belief is that they were cursed by god at the time of creation and thereby banished to live in forest and to steal.

Their shift from being mercenary soldiers and cultivators, and the scattering of their communities in India, came towards the end of the 13th century with the rise of the Deccan sultanates. The new rulers took control of Rajput kingdoms and led to the Bavari and various other groups to adopt thieving and vagrancy as a means of survival, as well as developing a mutual distrust with the more settled landowning peoples.

== British era ==
British authorities in Punjab Province became frustrated by the criminal behaviour they perceived to be exhibited by some nomadic and semi-itinerant communities, including the Babaria, some of whom had developed a tactic of raiding British-controlled territories and then seeking refuge in areas controlled by native princes. The authorities thought that limiting the movement of these groups would minimise this as well as allowing for better monitoring of their activities and encouraging them to switch from criminality to agricultural pursuits. Inspired by the reported successes of William Henry Sleeman in controlling the Thugs of the North-Western Provinces, they initially attempted to restrict movement by imposing a system of compulsory registration at police stations, insisting on the targeted people being in their own village overnight unless they had permission for absence, and loading of responsibility for their location and actions on to the village headmen. These measures were easily evaded by many nomads, who just dispersed or proffered different identities.

Thus, by the mid-1850s, the British turned instead to internment as a solution to their problem. The experiment failed and indeed was forecast to fail by several British administrators, who noted that the communities were so averse to engaging in agriculture that it could never work and that they would just become a burden on food supplies, for they would either have to starve or be fed via aid.

Rather than letting a bad idea die after the courts deemed internment illegal in 1867, the ruling spurred the administrations of both Punjab and the North-Western Provinces to seek a national system. Using data compiled from then accepted theories of scientific racism and poorly-sourced ethnographic surveys of folk tales, which suggested entire groups of people as hereditarily criminal, this ultimately resulted in the introduction of the Criminal Tribes Act in 1871. The Babaria of the Punjab became subject to it by order in August 1875 and their alleged characteristics were subsequently documented by V. T. P. Vivian in his A Handbook of Criminal Tribes of the Punjab (1912).

== Modern era ==
The Criminal Tribes Act was repealed in 1952, after the independence of India, meaning that they were then recorded as a Denotified Tribe, but it was replaced by the 1953 Habitual Offenders Act which, together with the long prior history of being stigmatised as a criminal community, means that the Bawaria remain a socially oppressed people, are still subject to harassment by law enforcement bodies such as the police and forestry departments, and are still stereotyped as criminals. Fear and wariness of outsiders has persisted among them as a consequence.

The 1981 census of India recorded the Babaria living in Haryana, Punjab, Rajasthan and Uttar Pradesh, with populations of 31,296, 62,624, 31,903, and 4,893, respectively. They remain largely a nomadic community but their traditional lifestyle, which revolved around hunting in forests and selling anything surplus to their own requirements, has been severely affected, as also has their movement, by the introduction of the Wildlife Protection Act, 1972. Their ability to move has also been affected by changing land use, caused by urbanisation and agricultural strategies that are significantly reducing areas of common land on which they traditionally camped in tents.

The Bawaria are classified as a Scheduled Caste under India's reservation system.

== See also ==
- Babariawad
