= List of Tamil films of 2019 =

This is a list of Tamil language films produced in the Tamil cinema in India that were released/scheduled to be released in 2019.

== Box office collection ==
The highest-grossing Kollywood films released in 2019, by worldwide box office gross revenue, are as follows.

#+	Implies that the film is multilingual and the gross collection figure includes the worldwide collection of the other simultaneously filmed version.

Highest worldwide gross of 2019
Rank	Title	Production company	Distributor	Worldwide gross	Ref.
1	Bigil	AGS Entertainment	AGS Entertainment	₹350-380 crore	
2	Petta	Sun Pictures	Sun Pictures	₹200-220 crore	
3	Viswasam	Sathya Jyothi Films	KJR Studios	₹185-200 crore	
4	Asuran	V Creations	V Creations	₹150 crore	
5	Kanchana 3	Sun Pictures & Raghavendra Productions	Sun Pictures	₹130 crore	
6	Kaithi	Dream Warrior Pictures	Dream Warrior Pictures	₹110 crore	
7	Nerkonda Paarvai	Boney Kapoor & Zee Studios	S Pictures & Kandhasamy Arts	₹105 crore	
8	Kaappaan	Lyca Productions	Lyca Productions	₹90 crore	
9	Namma Veetu Pillai	Sun Pictures	Sun Pictures	₹60 crore	
10	NGK	Dream Warrior Pictures	Reliance Entertainment	₹55-60 crore	

== Released films ==
The list of released and scheduled to be released films in quarter wise sections.

=== January – March ===
Opening		Title	Director	Cast	Studio	Ref
J A N	4	Dhevakottai Kadhal	A. R. Kashim	Seenu, Suvitha, Ganja Karuppu	Abbas Movie Line	
J A N	4	Maanik	Martyn	Ma Ka Pa Anand, Suza Kumar, Yogi Babu	Mohita Cine Talkies	
J A N	9	Sigai	Jagadeesan Subu	Kathir, Raj Bharath, Meera Nair	Divine Studios	
J A N	10	Petta	Karthik Subbaraj	Rajinikanth, Vijay Sethupathi, Trisha, Simran, Nawazuddin Siddiqui	Sun Pictures	
J A N	10	Viswasam	Siva	Ajith Kumar, Nayanthara, Jagapathi Babu	Sathya Jyothi Films	
J A N	25	Charlie Chaplin 2	Sakthi Chidambaram	Prabhu Deva, Nikki Galrani, Adah Sharma, Prabhu	Amma Creations	
J A N	25	Kuthoosi	Siva Sakthi	Dileepan, Amala Rose Kurian, Yogi Babu	Sri Lakshmi Studios	
J A N	25	Simba	Arvind Sridhar	Bharath, Premgi Amaren, Bhanu Sri Mehra, Swathi Deekshith	Magic Chair Films, Yasodha Films	
F E B	1	Pei Ellam Paavam	Deepak Narayan	Arasu Nadarajan, Dona Shankar, Appukutty	Tharakan Cinemas	
F E B	1	Peranbu	Ram	Mammootty, Anjali, Sadhana	Shree Rajalakshmi Films	
F E B	1	Sagaa	Murugesh	Saran, Kishore, Sree Raam	Selly Cinemas	
F E B	1	Sarvam Thaala Mayam	Rajiv Menon	G. V. Prakash Kumar, Aparna Balamurali, Nedumudi Venu, Vineeth	Mindscreen Cinemas	
F E B	1	Vantha Rajavathaan Varuven	Sundar C	Silambarasan, Megha Akash, Catherine Tresa, Ramya Krishnan	Lyca Productions	
F E B	7	Dhilluku Dhuddu 2	Rambala	Santhanam, Shritha Sivadas, Deepti, Rajendran	Handmade Films	
F E B	7	Podhu Nalan Karudhi	Zion	Santhosh Prathap, Adith Arun, Karunakaran, Subiksha, Anu Sithara	AVR Productions	
F E B	8	Avathara Vettai	Star Kunjumon	V. R. Vinayak, Meera Nair, Radha Ravi	Star Kunjumon Productions	
F E B	8	Nethraa	A. Venkatesh	Vinay, Thaman Kumar, Subiksha	Swetha Cine Arts, Vengatesh Pictures	
F E B	8	Urangapuli	M. S. Raj	Navin	CJ Pictures, Naatchiyaal Films	
F E B	8	Vaandu	Vashan Shaji	Chinu, Guna, Shigaa, Allwin	MM Power Cine Creations	
F E B	9	Kalavu	Murali Karthik	Kalaiyarasan, Karunakaran, Abhirami Iyer	Spicy Cool Impressions, Big Print Pictures	
F E B	14	Dev	Rajath Ravishankar	Karthi, Rakul Preet Singh, Ramya Krishnan	Prince Pictures	
F E B	15	Chithiram Pesuthadi 2	Rajan Madhav	Vidharth, Ajmal, Ashok, Gayathrie, Radhika Apte	Dream Bridge Productions	
F E B	15	Goko Mako	Arunkanth	Ram Kumar, Dhanush, Sarah, Chaams, Delhi Ganesh	InfoPluto Media Works	
F E B	15	Kadhal Mattum Vena	Sam Khan	Sam Khan, Elizabeth, Divyanganaa Jain	Luckky Studios	
F E B	21	To Let	Chezhiyan	Santhosh Sreeram, Suseela, Dharun	Zha Cinema	
F E B	22	Arandavanuku Irundadhellam Pei	M. S. Selva	P. Saravanan, Anu Krishna	KKP Vela Films	
F E B	22	Kanne Kalaimaane	Seenu Ramasamy	Udhayanidhi Stalin, Tamannaah, Vadivukkarasi	Red Giant Movies	
F E B	22	LKG	K. R. Prabhu	RJ Balaji, Priya Anand, Nanjil Sampath	Vels Film International	
F E B	22	Pettikadai	Esakki Karvannan	Samuthirakani, Chandini Tamilarasan, Varsha Bollamma	Lakshmi Creations	
M A R	1	90 ML	Anita Udeep	Oviya, Anson Paul, Masoom Shankar, Monisha Ram, Bommu Lakshmi, Shree Gopika	Nviz Entertainment	
M A R	1	Adadae	Kamal Saromuni	Aru Pazhani, Alexander Babu, Vikram Shadev, Saravanan	Creative Horse Entertainment	
M A R	1	Dha Dha 87	Vijay Sri	Charuhasan, Janagaraj, Saroja, Anand Kumar	Kalai Cinemas	
M A R	1	Pirivadhillai	Seethapathy Ram	Vivin, Nandhini	Sri Udhayam Studios	
M A R	1	Thadam	Magizh Thirumeni	Arun Vijay, Tanya Hope, Smruthi Venkat, Vidya Pradeep	Redhan – The Cinema People	
M A R	1	Thirumanam	Cheran	Umapathy Ramaiah, Kavya Suresh, Cheran, Sukanya	Preniss International	
M A R	1	Vilambaram	K. A. Suriyanithi	Abhinay Vaddi, Haira, Aishwarya Rajesh, Thambi Ramaiah	Prince Film Factory	
M A R	8	Boomerang	R. Kannan	Atharvaa, Megha Akash, Indhuja Ravichandran, Upen Patel	Trident Arts, M.K.R.P. Productions	
M A R	8	Kabilavasthu	Nesam Murali	Nesam Murali, Viji	Buddha Films	
M A R	8	Pottu	Vadivudaiyan	Bharath, Iniya, Namitha, Srushti Dange	Shalom Studios	
M A R	8	Sathru	Naveen Nanjundan	Kathir, Srushti Dange, Neelima Rani, Suja Varunee	RT Entertainment	
M A R	8	Spot	VRR	Kaushik, Agni Pawar, Nassar	RFI	
M A R	15	Aghavan	A. P. G. Elumalai	Kishore Ravichandran, Chirashree Anchan, Nithya Shetty	RBK Movies	
M A R	15	Gilli Bambaram Goli	D. Manoharan	Deepti Shetty, Naresh, Prasath Karthik	Shri Sai Film Circuit	
M A R	15	Ispade Rajavum Idhaya Raniyum	Ranjit Jeyakodi	Harish Kalyan, Shilpa Manjunath, Ma Ka Pa Anand, Bala Saravanan	Madhav Media	
M A R	15	July Kaatril	K. C. Sundaram	Ananth Nag, Anju Kurian, Samyuktha Menon, Paloma Monnappa, Sathish	Kaviya Entertainments	
M A R	15	Nedunalvaadai	Selvakannan	Poo Ramu, Mime Gopi, Elvis Alexander, Anjali Nair	B Star Production	
M A R	22	Agni Devi	John Paul Raj	Bobby Simha, Ramya Nambeesan, Madhoo	Seatoa Studios, Jai Film Productions	
M A R	22	Embiran	Krishna Pandi	Rejith Menon, Radhika Preeti, Moulee	Panchavarnam Films	
M A R	22	Maanasi	Navaz Suleiman	Naresh Madeswar, Harissa Begum, Thavasi	MJ Films, Movie Masons	
M A R	22	Neerthirai	P. S. Dharan	Nassar, Thalaivasal Vijay, Rohini, Ashwin Kakumanu	N Media	
M A R	22	Pattipulam	Suresh	Veerasamar, Amitha, Yogi Babu	Chandraa Media Vision	
M A R	22	Saaral	DRL	Azhar, Sri Priyanka, Kadhal Sukumar	Rainbow Movie Makers	
M A R	22	Settaikkaranga	M. Muthu Manickam	Naren, Divya	Diva Dika Films	
M A R	28	Airaa	Sarjun K. M.	Nayanthara, Kalaiyarasan, Yogi Babu, Kulappuli Leela	KJR Studios	
M A R	29	Super Deluxe	Thiagarajan Kumararaja	Vijay Sethupathi, Fahadh Faasil, Samantha, Ramya Krishnan, Mysskin	Kino Fist, East West DreamWorks Entertainment, Alchemy Vision Workz	

=== April – June ===
Opening		Title	Director	Cast	Studio	Ref
A P R	4	Natpe Thunai	Parthiban Desingu	Hiphop Tamizha, Anagha, Karu Pazhaniappan	Avni Cinemax	
A P R	5	Ganesha Meendum Santhipom	Rateesh Erate	Prithvi Rajan, Devika, Oviya, Singampuli	Hari Geetha Pictures, Skyway Pictures	
A P R	5	Kuppathu Raja	Baba Bhaskar	G. V. Prakash Kumar, Parthiepan, Palak Lalwani	S Focuss	
A P R	5	Kudimagan	Sathieshwaran	Jaikumar, Akash, Nanditha Jennifer	Jeevamalar Sathieshwaran Movies	
A P R	5	Uriyadi 2	Vijay Kumar	Vijay Kumar, Vismaya, Sudhakar	2D Entertainment	
A P R	12	Gangs of Madras	C. V. Kumar	Priyanka Ruth, Daniel Balaji, Ashok	Thirukumaran Entertainment	
A P R	12	Rocky: The Revenge	K. C. Bokadia	Srikanth, Eshanya Maheshwari, Sayaji Shinde	BMB Music and Magnetics	
A P R	12	Watchman	A. L. Vijay	G. V. Prakash Kumar, Samyuktha Hegde, Raj Arjun	Double Meaning Productions	
A P R	12	Zhagaram	Krish	Nandha, Eden Kuriakose, Vishnu Bharath	Katheer Films	
A P R	19	Kanchana 3	Raghava Lawrence	Raghava Lawrence, Vedhika, Oviya, Nikki Tamboli	Sun Pictures	
A P R	19	Mehandi Circus	Saravana Rajendran	Madhampatty Rangaraj, Shweta Tripathi	Studio Green	
A P R	19	Vellai Pookal	Vivek Elangovan	Vivek, Charle, Dev, Pooja Devariya	Indus Arts	
A P R	26	Alagarum Rendu Allakaium	K. Thambidurai	K. Thambidurai, Deepa	Aravind Arts	
A P R	26	Mudivilla Punnagai	Arokiasamy Clement	Cool Suresh, Rakshita, Nellai Siva	Goodson Creations	
M A Y	1	Devarattam	M. Muthaiah	Gautham Karthik, Manjima Mohan, Soori	Studio Green	
M A Y	3	K-13	Barath Neelakantan	Arulnithi, Shraddha Srinath, Gayathrie, Yogi Babu	SP Cinemas	
M A Y	3	Thanimai	S. Sivaraman	Sonia Agarwal, Sandy, Ganja Karuppu	Foot Steps Production	
M A Y	3	Thanthai Sol Mikka Manthiram Illai	Sivabalakrishnan	Sivabalakrishnan, Priyanka Dharnae, Subramaniam	Agni Arunachalam Company	
M A Y	10	Enge Sendrai En Uyire	R. V. Pandi	Tharun, Rabiya, Ananya	Jemakara Films	
M A Y	10	Kadhal Munnetra Kazhagam	Manicka Sathya	Prithvi Rajan, Chandini Tamilarasan, Singampuli	Bluehills Production	
M A Y	10	Kee	Kalees	Jiiva, Nikki Galrani, Anaika Soti	Global Infotainment	
M A Y	10	Unmaiyen Velicham	P. K. Sivakumar	Kirthi Krishna, Nizhalgal Ravi, Vijay Aathik	Sree Sree Printers	
M A Y	10	Vedhamanavan	M. Pughazhendi	Mano Jeyanth, Urvashi Joshi, Delhi Ganesh	Chellam & Co Creations	
M A Y	11	100	Sam Anton	Atharvaa, Hansika Motwani, Yogi Babu	Auraa Cinemas	
M A Y	11	Ayogya	Venkat Mohan	Vishal, Raashi Khanna, Parthiban	Vishal Film Factory	
M A Y	17	Jaikkapovadhu Yaaru	Sam C. S.	Sam C. S., Pandiarajan, Powerstar Srinivasan	Tittu Productions	
M A Y	17	Monster	Nelson Venkatesan	S. J. Surya, Priya Bhavani Shankar, Karunakaran	Potential Studios	
M A Y	17	Mr. Local	M. Rajesh	Sivakarthikeyan, Nayanthara, Radhika	Studio Green	
M A Y	17	Natpuna Ennanu Theriyuma	ShivaKumar Arvind	Kavin, Remya Nambeesan, Arunraja Kamaraj	Libra Productions	
M A Y	24	Lisaa	Raju Vishwanath	Anjali, Sam Jones, Makarand Deshpande, Yogi Babu	PG Media Works	
M A Y	24	Neeya 2	L. K. Suresh	Jai, Catherine Tresa, Raai Laxmi	Jumbo Films	
M A Y	24	Oviyavai Vitta Yaru	Rajadurai	Sanjeevi, Oviya, Ganja Karuppu, Vaiyapuri	Velammal Cine Creations	
M A Y	24	Owdatham	Ramani	S. Nethaji Prabhu, Samaira	Red Chilly Black Pepper Cinemas	
M A Y	24	Perazhagi ISO	C. Vijayan	Shilpa Manjunath, Vivek Raj, Sachu	Creamines Movie Makers	
M A Y	24	Rusithu Paar En Anbe	Matthew Yuvani	Matthew, Kumar, Jayan	Holyfire Films	
M A Y	24	Vannakili Bharathi	Igore	Vijay Karan, Manisha Jith, Ganja Karuppu	Film Puja	
M A Y	31	Devi 2	A. L. Vijay	Prabhu Deva, Tamannaah, Nandita Swetha	GV Films	
M A Y	31	NGK	Selvaraghavan	Suriya, Sai Pallavi, Rakul Preet Singh	Dream Warrior Pictures	
M A Y	31	Thiruttu Kalyanam	Shakthivelan	Rangayazhi, Tejaswi, Devadarshini, Thambi Ramaiah	Sri Senthoor Pictures	
J U N	5	Seven	Nizar Shafi	Havish, Rahman, Regina Cassandra, Nandita Swetha	Kiran Studios	
J U N	6	Kolaigaran	Andrew Louis	Vijay Antony, Arjun Sarja, Ashima Narwal	Diya Movies	
J U N	14	Game Over	Ashwin Saravanan	Taapsee Pannu, Vinodhini, Anish Kuruvilla	YNOT Studios	
J U N	14	Nenjamundu Nermaiyundu Odu Raja	Karthik Venugopalan	Rio Raj, RJ Vigneshkanth, Shirin Kanchwala	Sivakarthikeyan Productions	
J U N	14	Suttu Pidikka Utharavu	Ramprakash Rayappa	Vikranth, Mysskin, Suseenthiran, Athulya Ravi	Kalpataru Pictures	
J U N	21	Mosadi	K. Jagatheesan	Viju Ayyapasamie, Pallavi Dora, Muthusamy	JCS Movies	
J U N	21	Thumbaa	Harish Ram	Darshan, Keerthi Pandian, Dheena	Regal Reels	
J U N	27	Sindhubaadh	S. U. Arun Kumar	Vijay Sethupathi, Anjali, Linga	Vansan Movies, K Productions	
J U N	28	Dharmaprabhu	S. Muthukumaran	Yogi Babu, Karunakaran, Ramesh Thilak	Sri Vaari Films	
J U N	28	House Owner	Lakshmy Ramakrishnan	Kishore, Sriranjani, Pasanga Kishore, Lovelyn Chandrasekhar	Monkey Creative Labs	
J U N	28	Jiivi	V. J. Gopinath	Vetri, Monica Chinnakotla, Ashwini, Karunakaran	Vetrivel Saravana Cinemas	
J U N	28	Natchathira Jannalil	Jayamurugesan	Abishek Kumaran, Anupriya, Bose Venkat	Om Siva Sakthi Muruga Films	

=== July – September ===
Opening		Title	Director	Cast	Studio	Ref
J U L Y	5	Enakku Innum Kalyanam Aakale	Murugalingam	Jagan, Manishajith, Chaams, Piraisoodan	Muthuvinayaka Movies	
J U L Y	5	Kalavani 2	A. Sarkunam	Vimal, Oviya, RJ Vigneshkanth, Saranya Ponvannan	Varmans Productions	
J U L Y	5	Raatchasi	Sy. Gowthamraj	Jyothika, Poornima Bhagyaraj, Sathyan, Hareesh Peradi	Dream Warrior Pictures	
J U L Y	12	Bodhai Yeri Budhi Maari	Chandru	Dheeraj, Dushara, Meera Mitun, Pradaini Surva	Rise East Entertainments	
J U L Y	12	Gorilla	Don Sandy	Jiiva, Shalini Pandey, Sathish, Vivek Prasanna	All in Pictures	
J U L Y	12	Gurkha	Sam Anton	Yogi Babu, Charle, Raj Bharath, Elyssa Erhardt	4 Monkeys Studios	
J U L Y	12	Thozhar Venkatesan	Mahashivan	Harishankar, Monica Chinnakotla	Kaala Films	
J U L Y	12	Vennila Kabaddi Kuzhu 2	Selvasekaran	Vikranth, Arthana Binu, Pasupathy, Kishore	Saai Arputham Cinemas	
J U L Y	17	Igloo	Bharath Mohan	Amzath Khan, Anju Kurian, RJ Vigneshkanth	Drumsticks Productions	
J U L Y	19	Aadai	Rathnakumar	Amala Paul, Ramya Subramanian, Vivek Prasanna	V Studios	
J U L Y	19	Kadaram Kondan	Rajesh Selva	Vikram, Akshara Haasan, Abi Hassan	Raaj Kamal Films International	
J U L Y	19	Unarvu	Subu Venkat	Suman, Aroul D. Shankar, Shinav, Ankitha	Amrutha Film Center	
J U L Y	26	A1	Johnson	Santhanam, Tara Alisha Berry, Yatin Karyekar	CircleBox Entertainment	
J U L Y	26	Aaradi	Santhosh	Vijayaraj, Deepika Rangaraj	Shiva Kudumbam Films	
J U L Y	26	Chennai Palani Mars	Biju Viswanath	Praveen Raja, Rajesh Giriprasad, Rajkumar	Vijay Sethupathi Productions	
J U L Y	26	Kolanji	Dhanaram Saravanan	Samuthirakani, Sanghavi, Rajaji, Naina Sarwar	White Shadows Productions	
A U G	2	Jackpot	Kalyaan	Jyothika, Revathi, Yogi Babu, Rajendran	2D Entertainment	
A U G	2	Kazhugu 2	Sathyasiva	Krishna, Bindu Madhavi, Kaali Venkat	Madukkur Movie Makers	
A U G	2	Thorati	P. Marimuthu	Shaman Mithru, Sathyakala, Azhagu	Shaman Pictures	
A U G	8	Nerkonda Paarvai	H. Vinoth	Ajith Kumar, Shraddha Srinath, Rangaraj Pandey	Zee Studios	
A U G	9	Kolaiyuthir Kaalam	Chakri Toleti	Nayanthara, Bhumika Chawla, Rohini Hattangadi	Etcetera Entertainment	
A U G	9	Reel	Munuswamy	Uday Raj, Avanthika	Sree Muruka Movie Makers	
A U G	9	Seemapuram	Jolyman	Bruce Lee Rajesh, Vaishnavi, Jolyman	JTR Movie	
A U G	9	Valayal	A. Gurusekara	Sakthee Sivan, Manoj Bharathiraja, Bhavya Sri	BR Movie Makers	
A U G	15	Comali	Pradeep Ranganathan	Jayam Ravi, Kajal Aggarwal, Samyuktha Hegde	Vels Films International	
A U G	16	Maankutty	M. Boobalan	Suresh, Hemalatha	V. N. Balan Pictures	
A U G	16	Puli Adichan Patti	Vaidyaa	Vaidyaa, Ramesh	Kudavarasi Movie Creations	
A U G	22	Kennedy Club	Suseenthiran	Sasikumar, Bharathiraja, Gayathrie	Nallusamy Pictures	
A U G	23	Bakrid	Jagadeesan Subu	Vikranth, Vasundhara Kashyap, Rohit Pathak	M10 Productions	
A U G	23	Mei	S. A. Bhaskaran	Nicky Sundaram, Aishwarya Rajesh, Kishore	Sundaram Productions	
A U G	30	Mayuran	Nandan Subbrayan	Anjan Dev, Ashmitha Dogra, Vela Ramamoorthy	Pinnacle Film Studio	
A U G	30	Sixer	Chachi	Vaibhav, Palak Lalwani, Sathish	Trident Arts	
S E P	6	Magamuni	Santhakumar	Arya, Mahima Nambiar, Indhuja Ravichandran	Studio Green	
S E P	6	Sivappu Manjal Pachai	Sasi	Siddharth, G. V. Prakash Kumar, Lijomol Jose, Kashmira Pardeshi, Rithu Manthra	Abhishek Films	
S E P	6	Zombie	Bhuvan Nullan	Yogi Babu, Yashika Aannand, Gopi Sudhakar	S3 Pictures	
S E P	13	En Kaadhali Scene Podura	Ram Sevaa	Mahesh, Shalu Chourasiya, Gokulnath	Shankar Movies International	
S E P	13	Ongala Podanum Sir	R. L. Ravi-Sreejith Vijayan	Jithan Ramesh, Sanuja Somanath, Jonita Doda	Zigma Films	
S E P	13	Perunali	Citizen Mani	Jayan, Nitheka Sree, Citizen Mani	Margaret Anthony	
S E P	20	Kaappaan	K. V. Anand	Suriya, Mohanlal, Arya, Sayyeshaa	Lyca Productions	
S E P	20	Oththa Seruppu Size 7	Parthiepan	Parthiepan	Bioscope Film Framers	
S E P	20	Super Duper	AK	Dhruva, Indhuja, Shah Ra	Flux Films	
S E P	27	Namma Veettu Pillai	Pandiraj	Sivakarthikeyan, Aishwarya Rajesh, Anu Emmanuel	Sun Pictures	
S E P	27	Thittam Poattu Thirudura Kootam	Sudhar	Chandran, Satna Titus, Parthiepan	Two Movie Buffs	

=== October – December ===
Opening		Title	Director	Cast	Studio	Ref
O C T	4	100% Kadhal	M. M. Chandramouli	G. V. Prakash Kumar, Shalini Pandey	Creative Cinemas NY, NJ Entertainment	
O C T	4	Asuran	Vetrimaaran	Dhanush, Manju Warrier, Prakash Raj	V Creations	
O C T	11	Aruvam	Sai Sekhar	Siddharth, Catherine Tresa, Kabir Duhan Singh	Trident Arts	
O C T	11	Petromax	Rohin Venkatesan	Tamannaah, Yogi Babu, Kaali Venkat	Eagle's Eye Production	
O C T	11	Puppy	Natty Dev	Varun, Samyuktha Hegde, Yogi Babu	Vels Film International	
O C T	18	Bow Bow	S. Pradeep Kilikar	Master Ahaan, Shiva, Tejaswy	London Talkies	
O C T	18	Kaaviyyan	Sarathi	Shaam, Sridevi Kumar, Athmiya Rajan	2 m Cinemas	
O C T	25	Bigil	Atlee	Vijay, Nayanthara, Jackie Shroff	AGS Entertainment	
O C T	25	Kaithi	Lokesh Kanagaraj	Karthi, Narain, Dheena	Dream Warrior Pictures	
N O V	8	Butler Balu	M. L. Suthir	Yogi Babu, Mayilsamy, Gautham Krishna, Shalini	Thozhaa Cine Creations	
N O V	8	Miga Miga Avasaram	Suresh Kamatchi	Sri Priyanka, Arish Kumar, Muthuraman	V House Production	
N O V	8	Thavam	Vijay Anand, Suriyan	Vasi Ashif, Pooja Shree, Seeman	Ashif Film International	
N O V	15	Action	Sundar C	Vishal, Tamannaah, Aishwarya Lekshmi	Trident Arts	
N O V	16	Sangathamizhan	Vijay Chandar	Vijay Sethupathi, Raashi Khanna, Nivetha Pethuraj	Vijaya Productions	
N O V	22	Adithya Varma	Gireesaya	Dhruv Vikram, Banita Sandhu, Priya Anand	E4 Entertainment	
N O V	22	K. D.	Madhumitha	Mu Ramaswamy, Nagavishal, Yog Japee	Yoodlee Films	
N O V	22	Maggy	Kartikeyen	Doubt Senthil, Kaala Pradeep, Reeya Harini	Sai Ganesh Pictures	
N O V	22	Panam Kaaikkum Maram	JP	Akshay, Agalya, Badava Gopi, Bose Venkat	Dharsh Show Company	
N O V	22	Pei Vaala Pudicha Kadha	Mankavasagam	Anureethu, Dhivas, Motta Ravi, Nellai Siva	Konoornadu Films	
N O V	29	Adutha Saattai	M. Anbazhagan	Samuthirakani, Thambi Ramaiah, Athulya Ravi	11: 11 Productions	
N O V	29	Azhiyatha Kolangal 2	M. R. Bharathi	Prakash Raj, Revathi, Nassar, Archana	Charulatha Films	
N O V	29	Enai Noki Paayum Thota	Gautham Vasudev Menon	Dhanush, Megha Akash, Sasikumar	Ondraga Entertainment	
N O V	29	Market Raja MBBS	Saran	Arav, Kavya Thapar, Radhika Sarathkumar	Surabi Films	
N O V	29	Theemaikum Nanmai Sei	Raghava Hari Kesava	Vicky, Rathi	MS Banana Films	
D E C	2	Mine	Vimaliesh Sekar	Vimaliesh Sekar, Poornima Ravi	Maharajah Creations	
D E C	6	Dhanusu Raasi Neyargale	Sanjay Bharathi	Harish Kalyan, Digangana Suryavanshi, Reba Monica John	Sree Gokulam Movies	
D E C	6	Irandam Ulagaporin Kadaisi Gundu	Athiyan Athirai	Dinesh, Anandhi, Riythvika	Neelam Productions	
D E C	6	Iruttu	V. Z. Durai	Sundar C, Sai Dhanshika, Sakshi Chaudhary	Screen Scene Media Entertainment	
D E C	6	Jada	Kumaran	Kathir, Roshini Prakash, Yogi Babu	The Poet Studios	
D E C	13	50 Roova	G. Panneerselvam	Akhil, Sunu Lakshmi, Manobala	Ansari Media	
D E C	13	Capmaari	S. A. Chandrasekhar	Jai, Vaibhavi Shandilya, Athulya Ravi	Green Signal	
D E C	13	Champion	Suseenthiran	Vishwa, Mirnalini Ravi, Narain	Kalanjiyam Cine Arts	
D E C	13	Chennai 2 Bangkok	Sathish Santhosh	Jai Akash, Sony Charsitha, Yogi Babu	Jai Balaji Movie Makers	
D E C	13	Kaalidas	Sri Senthil	Bharath, Ann Sheetal, Suresh Chandra Menon	Incredible Productions	
D E C	13	Karuthukalai Pathivu Sei	Rahul Paramahamsa	SSR Aryan, Upasana RC	RPM Cinemas	
D E C	13	Manguni Pandiyargal	Jebaa	Jebaa, Ashitha Sai, Vasu Vikram, Bonda Mani	Golden Crow Films	
D E C	13	Marina Puratchi	M. S. Raj	Naveen Kumar, Shruti Reddy	J Studios	
D E C	13	Thirupathi Samy Kudumbam	Suresh Shanmugam	JK, Jahin, Aishwarya Lakshmi, Mayilswamy	JJ Good Films	
D E C	17	RK Nagar	Saravana Rajan	Vaibhav, Sana Althaf, Sampath Raj	Black Ticket Company	
D E C	20	Hero	P. S. Mithran	Sivakarthikeyan, Arjun, Abhay Deol, Kalyani Priyadarshan	KJR Studios	
D E C	20	Khyla	Baskar Sinouvassane	Gogen, Baskar, Dana Naidu, Kausalya	Budobas International Films	
D E C	20	Paramu	Manick Jai	Manick Jai, Chithra	Batrinath Lingeshwar Production	
D E C	20	Thambi	Jeethu Joseph	Karthi, Jyothika, Sathyaraj, Nikhila Vimal	Viacom 18	
D E C	20	Virudhu	ADA Adhavan	Achayan, Adhavan, Aadhi	AD Adi Photos	
D E C	27	50/50	Krishna Sai	Yogi Babu, Sethu, Sruthi Ramakrishnan	Lipi Cine Crafts	
D E C	27	Naan Avalai Sandhitha Pothu	L. G. Ravichander	Santhosh Prathap, Chandini Tamilarasan, Sujatha	Cinema Platform	
D E C	27	Pancharaaksharam	Balaji Vairamuthu	Santhosh Prathap, Sana Althaf, Madhu Shalini	Paradox Productions	
D E C	27	Sillu Karuppatti	Halitha Shameem	Samuthirakani, Sunaina, Leela Samson, Sara Arjun	Divine Productions	
D E C	27	Udhay	Tamil Selvan	Udhay, Leema Babu, Ambani Shankar	Archers Production	
D E C	27	V1	Pavel Navageethan	Ram Arun Castro, Vishnupriya, Lijesh	Positive Print Studios	

== Awards ==
Category/organization	SIIMA Awards 19 September 2021	Ananda Vikatan Cinema Awards 12 January 2020	Zee Cine Awards Tamil 4 January 2020
Best Film	Kaithi	Peranbu	
Best Director	Vetrimaaran; Asuran	Vetrimaaran; Asuran	Vetrimaaran; Asuran
Best Actor	Dhanush; Asuran	Dhanush; Asuran	Dhanush; Asuran
Best Actress	Nayanthara; Viswasam	Taapsee Pannu; Game Over	Aishwarya Rajesh; Kanaa (2018)
Best Music Director	D. Imman; Viswasam	Yuvan Shankar Raja; Peranbu, Super Deluxe	Anirudh Ravichander; Petta
