= En Thangai =

En Thangai (lit. 'My Sister') may refer to:

- En Thangai (1952 film), a 1952 Indian Tamil-language film starring M. G. Ramachandran
- En Thangai (1989 film), a 1989 Indian Tamil-language feature film by A. Jagannathan
- En Thangai (TV series), 2015 Indian TV show

== See also ==
- My Sister (disambiguation)
- En Thangai Kalyani, a 1990 Indian Tamil-language feature film
