= Vasanthathinte Kanal Vazhikalil =

- Theatrical release poster
- Directed by: Anil V Nagendran
- Written by: Anil V Nagendran
- Produced by: Anil V Nagendran
- Starring: Samuthirakani; Thamarai; Mukesh; Sudheesh; Surabhi; Rithesh; Baiju VK
- Cinematography: Kaviarasan T.
- Edited by: B. Ajithkumar
- Music by: Songs: V. Dakshinamoorthy; M. K. Arjunan; Perumbavoor G. Raveendranath; A. R. Reihana; James Vasanthan; P. K. Medini; C. J. Kuttappan; Score: Anchal Udayakumar
- Production company: Visarad Creations
- Distributed by: Visarad Release
- Release date: 14 March 2014
- Running time: 135 minutes
- Country: India
- Language: Malayalam

Vasanthathinte Kanal Vazhikalil is a 2014 Malayalam-language political drama film directed by Anil V Nagendran, who is also the producer, writer and lyricist. The film stars Samuthirakani and Tamil actress Thamarai in the lead roles with an ensemble supporting cast of Mukesh, Sudheesh, Surabhi, Rithesh, and Baiju VK.

At the 44th Kerala State Film Awards, Ambootti won the Best Dubbing Artist award. At the Kerala Film Critics Association Awards, Mukesh won the Best Supporting Actor award.

== Plot ==
The film revolves around the political unrest in a village and the rise of three communist leaders from the pre-Independence era in Kerala–P. Krishna Pillai, E. M. S. Namboodiripad, and A. K. Gopalan.

== Cast ==
- Samuthirakani as P. Krishna Pillai (voice dubbed by Ambootti)
- Baiju VK as A. K. Gopalan
- Sudheesh as E. M. S. Namboodiripad
- Thamarai
- Mukesh as a journalist
- Siddique
- Surabhi as Chirutha
- Rithesh as Rairu Nambiar
- K. P. A. C. Lalitha as Madhaviyamma
- P. K. Medini
- Devan
- Bharani
- Bheeman Raghu
- Unnikrishnan Namboothiri
- Prem Kumar
- Shari as Theyi
- Gopika Anil as Mathangi
- Urmila Unni as Antharjanam
- Dharmajan Bolgatty
- Devika Nambiar
- Ramesh Pisharody

== Production ==
After making audio biographies about left-wing politics about E. M. S. Namboodiripad, A. K. Gopalan and P. Krishna Pillai, Nagendran went on to work on a feature film about these politicians with Sudheesh, Baiju, and Samuthirakani reprising the roles of Namboodiripad, Gopalan, and Pillai, respectively. A 6 kilometer set was erected in Sooranad, Kollam and all signals of the modern day including light posts and electrical lines were removed. Three-thousand actors have acted in the film, many of which are labourers who were trained to act. Cinematographer Kaviyarasu debuts in Mollywood with this film. Real footage from the Indian independence movement was included in the film.

== Soundtrack ==
Eight composers have composed the film songs and twenty singers have sung the songs. This film is the last film that V. Dakshinamoorthy composed music for. Activist P. K. Medini composed and sang a song in addition to acting in the film. Anchal Udayakumar composed the background score for the film.

Song	Composer	Lyricist	Singer(s)
"Thennale"	M. K. Arjunan	Kaithapram	K. J. Yesudas, K. S. Chithra
"Nalloru Naaleye"	C. J. Kuttappan	Anil V Nagendran	C. J. Kuttappan
"Aalumagni"	Perumbavoor G. Raveendranath	Prabha Varma	Reju Joseph, Ravisankar, Devika Subrahmanyan, Reji, Shubha Raghunath
"Kathunna Venaliloode"	V. Dakshinamoorthy	Anil V Nagendran	Anuradha Sriram, RK Ramadas, G Sreeram
"Adima Nukam"	James Vasanthan	Anil V Nagendran	K. J. Yesudas
"Athikkampil"	C. J. Kuttappan	Anil V Nagendran	C. J. Kuttappan, Soumya Sanathanan
"Kathunna Venaliloode" (Reprise)	P. K. Medini	Anil V Nagendran	P. K. Medini
"Chethi Minukki"	A. R. Reihana	Anil V Nagendran	Sreekanth, Amrita Jayakumar, Soniya Samjad, Manakkad Gopan, Yazin Nizar

== Release ==
The film originally released in March. The film received a complaint from the election commission that the film supported left-wing politics. The film was re-released in April.

The film was partially reshot in Tamil as Veeravanakkam in 2025 with Bharath.
