= Ninaithathu Yaaro =

2014 Indian film by Vikraman

- Theatrical release poster
- Directed by: Vikraman
- Written by: Vikraman
- Produced by: Ramesh P Pillai
- Starring: Rejith Menon; Nimisha Suresh
- Cinematography: R. K. Prathap
- Edited by: S. Richard
- Music by: X. Paulraj
- Production company: Abhishek Films
- Distributed by: Studio 9 Productions
- Release date: 30 January 2014
- Running time: 117 minutes
- Country: India
- Language: Tamil

Ninaithathu Yaaro (transl. Thought of someone) is a 2014 Indian Tamil-language romantic drama film written and directed by Vikraman and produced by Ramesh P Pillai. The project stars debutants Rejith Menon and Nimisha Suresh playing the lead pair with Karthik Yogi, Azhar, Ashvatt, Riythvika and Subiksha. The film began production in 2013 and was released on 30 January 2014.

== Plot ==
A director changes the perception of love for a group of youngsters by narrating how he reclaimed his life because of his now-married lover and her understanding husband.

== Cast ==
- Rejith Menon as Mohan
- Nimisha Suresh as Kavitha
- Karthik Yogi as Murthy
- Azhar as Saravanan
- Ashvatt as Karthik
- Riythvika as Thenmozhi
- Subiksha as Shamila
- Richard Rishi as Arun
- Leo Sivadass

Special appearances by actors and directors as themselves throughout the film (in alphabetical order) by

- Ameer
- Arish Kumar
- K. Balachandar
- Balaji Sakthivel
- K. Bhagyaraj
- M. S. Bhaskar
- Bharathiraja
- Cheran
- Chitra Lakshmanan
- Ezhil
- T. P. Gajendran
- Ineya
- Ravi Mohan
- Kathir
- Keyaar
- Mahendran
- Manivannan
- Monica
- A. R. Murugadoss
- Pandiarajan
- Parthiepan
- Prabhu Deva
- Prabhu Solomon
- Pyramid Natarajan
- M. Raja
- Ramesh Khanna
- K. S. Ravikumar
- Samuthirakani
- Santhana Bharathi
- Shankar
- Shanthnu Bhagyaraj
- S. S. Stanley
- Subbu Panchu
- Sundar C
- R. Sundarrajan
- Suriya
- Vasanth
- Venkat Prabhu
- P. Vasu
- Vimal
- Vivek

== Production ==
After the failure of Mariyadhai (2009), Vikraman took a sabbatical before launching a project titled Ilamai Naatkal in 2011. The film was however shelved after the producers ran into financial problems and is unlikely to release. He then chose to announce his return in October 2012 with a film titled Ninaithathu Yaaro . Newcomer producer Ramesh P Pillai was introduced to the director by a common friend and wanted him to direct their first venture after being impressed by his previous high-profile work. Vikraman revealed that the film would take a step away from his standard themes of family sentiment and the film would be based primarily on youngsters and love. Vikraman chose a fresh cast by advertising auditions on social media and thus then picked his lead actor Rejith Menon, who had appeared in a few Malayalam films, and Nimisha Suresh, a Bangalore-based IT professional who had appeared in other regional films. Keyboard player X. Paulraj was signed on to make his debut as music composer and produced seven songs for the film which were released in July 2013. The team shot scenes in Kashmir and also shot two songs there in picturesque locations in Pahalgam, becoming the first film Tamil unit after a decade to film portions there.

The film was completed but struggled to get a release until Studio 9 agreed to distribute the film and promised at least 100 screens in Tamil Nadu.

== Soundtrack ==
Ninaithathu Yaaro

Soundtrack album by X.Paulraj
- Released: 2014
- Recorded: 2013–2014
- Genre: Soundtrack
- Length: 33:04
- Label: Junglee Music
- Producer: X.Paulraj

Music was composed by X.Paulraj and Released on Junglee Music.

Track listing
No.	Title	Lyrics	Singer(s)	Length
1.	"Azhagana Kolaikaari"	Kalai Kumar	Haricharan	5:05
2.	"Kadhal Oru"	Vairabharathi	Jassie Gift, Suchithra	5:04
3.	"Kairegai" (Female)	Pa. Vijay	Chinmayi Sripaada	4:58
4.	"Kairegai" (Duet)	Pa.Vijay	Madhushree, Haricharan	5:03
5.	"Konjum Punnagai"	Pa.Vijay	Harish Raghavendra, Vinaya	4:52
6.	"Manase"	Vairabharathi	Ranjith, Shweta Mohan	3:43
7.	"Kairegai" (Remix)	Vairabharathi	Hyde Karty, Sylvester, Jassie Gift, Suchithra	4:19
Total length:				33:04

== Critical reception ==
The Times of India wrote "what should have been an emotional romantic drama that reaffirms our faith in love plays out as a dated film with amateurish performances, unsophisticated filmmaking and needless moralizing". Baradwaj Rangan wrote for The Hindu, "What's left of this tale is undone by simplistic storytelling, an earnest, overemphatic style, and some ugly moralising".
