= Aan Paavam =

1985 Indian film by Pandiarajan

- Poster
- Directed by: Pandiarajan
- Written by: Pandiarajan
- Produced by: Easwari Subramaniam
- Starring: Pandiyan; Pandiarajan; Revathi; Seetha
- Cinematography: Ashok Kumar
- Edited by: V. Rajagopal
- Music by: Ilaiyaraaja
- Production company: Alamu Movies
- Release date: 7 December 1985
- Country: India
- Language: Tamil

Aan Paavam (transl. Innocence of Man) is a 1985 Indian Tamil-language romantic comedy film written and directed by Pandiarajan. It was his second directorial venture and first as actor. The film also stars Pandiyan, Revathi and Seetha. It was released on 7 December 1985, and became a box office success. The film was remade into Telugu as Naku Pellam Kavali (1987) and in Kannada as Ramakrishna (2004).

== Plot ==
Periya Paandi and Chinna Paandi are two notorious sons of the village cinema theatre owner Ramasamy. Periya Paandi goes to a neighbouring village to see a girl as arranged by his father towards his marriage and ends up in the wrong house. Coincidentally, those in the wrong house are also expecting a man to see their daughter on the same time and the same day. Contrary to real-time arranged marriages, Periya Paandi goes to see the girl totally un-aided by parents, relatives and friends. Nevertheless, he takes a liking to the girl, Seetha, and decides to marry her. Seetha likes Periya Pandi and decides to accept the proposal.

Meanwhile, Seetha's marriage broker shows up and clarifies that Periya Paandi was supposed to have gone to see some other girl but ended up in the wrong house. Hearing this, Periya Paandi, Seetha and Seetha's parents seem disappointed. Ramasamy fixes dates for his marriage to the girl originally chosen for him Revathi, a school teacher's daughter. Periya Paandi's adamance to marry Seetha causes a strange turn of events. Chinna Paandi finally marries Revathi, while Periya Paandi ties the knot with his love Seetha.

== Cast ==
- Pandiyan as Periya Paandi
- Pandiarajan as Chinna Paandi
- Revathi as Revathi
- Seetha as Seetha
- V. K. Ramasamy as Ramasamy
- Meesai Murugesan as Murugesan
- Poornam Viswanathan as Viswanathan Vathiyar
- Janagaraj as Kanagaraj
- Usilai Mani as Kanagaraj's restaurant cook
- Kollangudi Karuppayi as Pandi's grandmother
- Ramesh Khanna as Marriage Broker (Cameo)
- Omakuchi Narasimhan as Parotta Master
- Pasi Narayanan as Cheating Customer
- Nellai Siva as Villager
- Super Subburayan as Super, a fighter
- Sridhar as Subakaran, Radio Mechanic
- Master Haja Sheriff as Cloth Shop Boy
- Krishnamurthy as Theatre Name Change Officer
- Thavakalai Chittibabu

== Production ==
Aan Paavam was Pandiarajan's second film as director and his debut film as an actor. Seetha who was studying in the twelfth grade at that time was selected to play the lead actress after Pandiarajan saw her in a video at a marriage. The scene where Pandiyan and Pandiarajan end up landing at the wrong houses to visit the girl was shot at Tirparappu near Nagercoil. Another scene was shot at Mugalivakkam.

== Soundtrack ==
The music was composed by Ilaiyaraaja. The song "Kadhal Kasakkudayya" is based on Shanmukhapriya raga, and "Kuyile Kuyile" is based on Madhyamavati.

Song	Singers	Lyrics	Length
"Enna Pada Sollathe"	S. Janaki	Vaali	4:18
"Indiran Vanthathum"	Ilaiyaraaja	Vairamuthu	3:41
"Kadhal Kasakkuthaiya"	Ilaiyaraaja	Vaali	4:23
"Kuyile Kuyile Poonguyile"	Malaysia Vasudevan, K. S. Chithra	Kuruvikkarambai Shanmugam	4:22
"Otti Vandha Singa Kutty"	Kollangudi Karuppayee	Kuruvikkarambai Shanmugam	5:33
"Enna Pada Sollathe"(Sad)	S. Janaki	Vaali	3:23

The movie was dubbed into Telugu as Pelli Pichollu and lyrics were written by Rajashri

Song	Singers
Kulike Sogase	S. P. Balasubrahmanyam, Vani Jayaram
Lovey Oka Dhuradha	S. P. Balasubrahmanyam
Naa Paata Vintava	S. P. Sailaja
Peddhalu Pillalu	Madhavapeddi Ramesh

== Critical reception ==
Jayamanmadhan of Kalki called the film's screenplay, dialogues and Janagaraj as plus points while praising Pandiarajan's acting as natural and added debutant Seetha has only little bit of camera fear, Pandiyan has managed his acting and the scenes involving Revathi evoke laughter. Anna praised acting, humour, music and direction.

== Future ==
Pandiarajan made a spiritual successor to this film titled Kai Vandha Kalai (2006) starring himself and his son Prithvi Rajan.

== Bibliography ==
- Sundararaman (2007) [2005]. Raga Chintamani: A Guide to Carnatic Ragas Through Tamil Film Music (2nd ed.). Pichhamal Chintamani. OCLC 295034757.
