= Subramaniya Swamy =

- Poster
- Directed by: Pandiarajan
- Screenplay by: Pandiarajan
- Story by: Raghunath Paleri
- Produced by: J. V. Rukmangadan; Karumari Kandasamy
- Starring: Pandiarajan; Urvashi; Priya Raman
- Cinematography: Nitthiyaa
- Edited by: V. Rajagopal; B. K. Mohan
- Music by: Deva
- Production company: R. K. Arts
- Release date: 12 February 1994
- Running time: 135 minutes
- Country: India
- Language: Tamil

Subramaniya Swamy is a 1994 Indian Tamil-language comedy film written and directed by Pandiarajan. The film stars himself, Urvashi and Priya Raman. A remake of the Malayalam film Mazhavilkavadi, it was released on 12 February 1994.

== Plot ==
Velayudham and his niece Valli have been in love since their childhood. Her father Rathnasamy hates Velayudham and has been looking for a suitable groom for his daughter. One day, Velayudham and Valli try to elope but Rathnasamy captures them. Vexed by this misadventure, Velayudham leaves his village for Palani to find a job with the help of his friend Kunju Khader. Kunju Khader turns out to be a pickpocket. In a twist of fate, Velayudham steals a bag with barber's tools and becomes a street barber. Soon, Cheena, the bag's owner, catches Velayudham. Velayudham lies and Cheena brings him to his house. There, Velayudham becomes his apprentice. Cheena's daughter Amudha falls in love with Velayudham. What transpires next forms the rest of the story.

== Cast ==
- Pandiarajan as Velayudham
- Urvashi as Amudha
- Priya Raman as Valli
- R. Sundarrajan as Rathnasamy
- Charle as Kunju Khader
- Mannangatti Subramaniam as Vasu
- Loose Mohan as Murugan
- Oru Viral Krishna Rao
- Shanmugasundaram
- C. R. Saraswathi as Sarasa
- Thideer Kannaiah as Ahamed
- Pramila Joshi as Baagiyam
- Pasi Narayanan
- Bayilvan Ranganathan as Inspector Azhagappan
- Manager Cheena as Cheena
- Janaki as Valli's mother
- Dakshayini as Velayudham's sister

== Soundtrack ==
The music was composed by Deva, with lyrics written by Vaali.

Song	Singer(s)	Duration
"Andru Namma"	Malaysia Vasudevan, S. Janaki	4:39
"Kadhal Kasanthidumo"	Krishnaraj, S. P. Sailaja	6:02
"Porakkavenum Porakkavenum"	Mano, K. S. Chithra	4:43
"Sei Thozhil Sei"	S. P. Balasubrahmanyam	4:55
"Saminna Namma"	Gangai Amaran, S. P. Sailaja	4:20

== Reception ==
Malini Mannath of The Indian Express gave the film a mixed review and said, "probably, in the adaptation, the flavour of the original was lost, because what we have here is only average fare". K. Vijiyan of New Straits Times wrote, "This is not a must-see movie". R. P. R. of Kalki called it a full-length comedy on love triangle and noted that the screenplay is like a stretched spring. He concluded the review saying though the film moves bit of speed in the middle, but incredibly smooth in the beginning and end.
