= Kai Vandha Kalai =

- DVD cover
- Directed by: Pandiarajan
- Written by: Pandiarajan
- Produced by: G. Venkateswaran
- Starring: Prithvi Rajan; Shruthi; Pandiarajan; Manivannan
- Music by: Dhina
- Production company: GV Films
- Release date: 15 June 2006
- Country: India
- Language: Tamil

Kai Vandha Kalai (transl. Handcrafted Art) is a 2006 Indian Tamil-language comedy film written and directed by Pandiarajan. The film stars his son Prithvi Rajan, whereas Sruthi, Manivannan, and the director himself play other important roles. The film, released on 15 June 2006, is a sequel to Aan Paavam (1985).

== Plot ==
Kannan is in league with his father in duping the people in his village. He comes across Kausalya (Sruthi), a timid, schoolgoing girl and falls for her immediately. From his grandfather, he learns that Kausalya's mother is his father's sister and becomes even more determined to wed her. Kausalya begins to like him too but asks him to mend his ways before they can get married.

== Cast ==
- Prithvi as Kannan
- Sruthi as Kausalya
- Pandiarajan as "Potti" Ganesan
- Manivannan as Kannan's father
- Seetha as Kausalya's mother
- Revathi as Mahalakshmi
- Rohini as Emcee
- Malavika in a guest appearance
- Pandiyan as Kausalya's father
- Vinu Chakravarthy as Village Elder
- Janagaraj as Villager
- Senthil as "Potti" Ganesan's friend
- Vennira Aadai Moorthy as Villager
- G. Gnanasambandam as Villager
- Pandu as Villager
- King Kong as Office Assistant
- Nellai Siva as Villager
- Bava Lakshmanan as Villager
- Suruli Manohar as Villager
- Chelladurai as Villager
- Bonda Mani as Grieving grandson
- Kovai Senthil as Villager
- Balu Anand as Villager
- Siva Narayana Murthy as Inspector Soundarrajan
- Benjamin as Villager
- Bayilvan Ranganathan as Villager
- Thideer Kannaiah as Office Assistant
- Theni Kunjarammal as Office Assistant (uncredited)

== Soundtrack ==
Music is composed by Dhina.

Song	Singers	Lyrics
"Suttipoove"	Karthik, Sadhana Sargam	Vairamuthu
"Veluthukattungada"	Jassie Gift	Vairamuthu
"Yakka Yakka"	Pallavarajan, Malathy	Vairamuthu
"Kadhal Inikuthappa"	Harish Raghavendra	Vairamuthu
"Thavalai Theme"	Prema Rajan	Vairamuthu

== Reception ==
Malini Mannath of Chennai Online opined that "With scenes and situations a little different from the routine ones, 'Kai Vantha Kalai' is a fairly engaging and a neatly packaged wholesome family entertainer". On the contrary, S. Sudha of Rediff.com wrote that "In short, far from a comeback or launch pad, this is just a big bore". The Hindu wrote "Compared to the films of today, `Kai ... ' is so decently made that at points you feel Pandiarajan is caught in a time warp. But that's also where the success of the maker lies; you wonder why he was in hibernation for so many years". Indiaglitz wrote "Supposedly a sequel to his yesteryear hit Aan Pavam, Pandiarajan has thrown out a simple and a straight forward film without many twists and turns that's worth a watch. Amidst all action-packed films of the day, Kai Vandhai Kalai is a movie with a simple narration and little characters". A critic from Cine South wrote that "Pandiarajan has proved again that we are old hands at making a comedy of the screenplay".
