= Muthukkal Moondru =

1987 film by A. Jagannathan

- Poster
- Directed by: A. Jagannathan
- Written by: Kuriakose Ranga
- Produced by: S. Padmanabhan
- Starring: Sivaji Ganesan; Sathyaraj; Pandiarajan; Ranjini
- Cinematography: Babu
- Edited by: V. Rajagopal; P. Mohanraj
- Music by: T. Rajendar
- Production company: Padmam Production
- Release date: 6 March 1987
- Country: India
- Language: Tamil

Muthukkal Moondru (transl. Three Pearls) is a 1987 Indian Tamil-language action thriller film directed by A. Jagannathan. The film stars Sivaji Ganesan, Sathyaraj, Pandiarajan and Ranjini. It was released on 6 March 1987.

== Cast ==
- Sivaji Ganesan as Father
- Sathyaraj as Sangili
- Pandiarajan as Pandiyan
- Ranjini as Meri
- Radha Ravi as Pasupathy / Kaali and Gajapathy
- Ambika in Valli (Guest appearance)
- Thengai Srinivasan as Soosai
- Thyagu as Constable
- Manorama as Pandiyan Mother
- Indira as Latha, Pandiyan Sister
- Haja Sheriff as Mechanic
- Baby Sujitha
- Azhagu as Mannar
- Bayilvan Ranganathan

== Production ==
The film was produced by actor Major Sundarrajan's son Major Raja alias S. Padmanabhan. The song "Ennayya Manasila" was shot at Coonoor.

== Soundtrack ==
Soundtrack was composed by T. Rajendar, who also wrote the lyrics.

Track listing
No.	Title	Singer(s)	Length
1.	"Ennayya Manasilu"	K. S. Chithra
2.	"Devan Koyil"	K. J. Yesudas
3.	"Mama Mama"	K. S. Chithra
4.	"Vazhgave"	Malaysia Vasudevan
5.	"Aazham Thriyama"	Malaysia Vasudevan, K. S. Chithra
6.	"Poove Chinna"	Malaysia Vasudevan, K. S. Chithra

== Reception ==
N. Krishnaswamy of The Indian Express said, "It is a hell of a story. Attempted rape, rape, suicide, murder, revenge, songs, dances, fights, all pieced together in an absurd, thoroughly contrived, exploitative jumble". Jayamanmadhan of Kalki appreciated Rajendar's music, but felt the story, though good, was not well executed.
