= Purushan Pondatti =

- Directed by: N. K. Viswanathan
- Screenplay by: P. Kalaimani
- Produced by: P. K. Yadav
- Starring: Pandiarajan; Ranjitha
- Cinematography: N. K. Viswanathan
- Edited by: V. Uthayasankaran
- Music by: Sirpy
- Production company: Sundar Theatres
- Release date: 6 December 1996
- Running time: 130 minutes
- Country: India
- Language: Tamil

Purushan Pondatti (transl. Husband and Wife) is a 1996 Indian Tamil-language comedy drama film directed by N. K. Viswanathan. The film stars Pandiarajan and Ranjitha. It was released on 6 December 1996. It won the Tamil Nadu State Film Award for Third Best Film.

== Plot ==
Pandian, a sale representative, marries Rajeswari. Pandian's mother Vadivu is a miser while his father Velmurugan is a good man and they also have three daughters. Vadivu takes advantage of Rajeswari's salary and dowry. For the marriage of her first daughter Malini, Vadivu uses Rajeswari's jewels. Then, the groom loses his job, so Pandian and Rajeswari decide on abortion for the family's benefit. In the meantime, Malini becomes pregnant. Rajeswari, who was angry to be treated as a cash cow by Vadivu, resigns from her job. Vadivu, who expected much from her salary, becomes upset and she tries to set Rajeswari on fire but Velmurugan saves her. Rajeswari then leaves Pandian's house and begins to look for a job and have the opportunity to be independent some day. Despite the fact that she looks for a job everywhere, she could not find one. So she becomes a dressmaker and after that, a successful entrepreneur of a clothes factory. Meanwhile, Pandian's family are crippled with debts. What transpires later forms the crux of the story.

== Cast ==
- Pandiarajan as Pandian
- Ranjitha as Rajeswari
- R. Sundarrajan as Rajeswari's father
- Manivannan as Velmurugan, Pandi's father
- Vadivukkarasi as Vadivu
- Pandiyan as Natarajan
- Vennira Aadai Moorthy as Pattusamy
- Latha as Malini
- Vijaya Chandrika as Rajeswari's mother
- C. R. Saraswathi as Suryakala
- Thyagu as Groom
- Pandu as Khan
- Thideer Kannaiah
- Kullamani
- MRK
- G. K.
- M. M. Vinayaga
- Karuppu Subbiah
- Joker Thulasi
- John Babu
- Vijayaganesh
- Kalaignanam (guest appearance)

== Soundtrack ==
The soundtrack was composed by Sirpy.

Song	Singer(s)	Lyrics	Duration
"Lottery Enakku"	Mano, Sangeetha Sajith	S. J. Suryah	4:57
"Mazhaiyadikuthu"	Mano, K. S. Chithra	Vairamuthu	4:52
"Natta Nadu Rathiri"	Mano, K. S. Chithra	Vairamuthu	4:30
"Pulla Venum"	Sirpy, K. S. Chithra	Vairamuthu	4:26
"Vaada Vayasu Paiya"	Maragatha Mani	Vairamuthu	4:06
