= Yenda Thalaiyila Yenna Vekkala =

2018 film by Vignesh Karthick

- Theatrical release poster
- Directed by: Vignesh Karthick
- Written by: Vignesh Karthick
- Produced by: A. R. Reihana; Subha Thambi Pillai; Indran Asirwatham
- Starring: Azhar; Sanchita Shetty; Eden Kuriakose
- Cinematography: Vamshidharan Mukundhan
- Edited by: C. S. Prem
- Music by: A. R. Reihana
- Production companies: Yogi and Partners
- Release date: 23 February 2018
- Country: India
- Language: Tamil

Yenda Thalaiyila Yenna Vekkala (transl. Why didn't you oil your hair?) is a 2018 Indian Tamil-language fantasy comedy film written and directed by Vignesh Karthick in his directorial debut and produced by A. R. Reihana. The film stars Azhar, Sanchita Shetty and Eden Kuriakose. It was shot between 2015 and 2016, and released on 23 February 2018.

== Plot ==
Pravin(Azhar), a young engineering graduate, lives with his family and tries to get placed in an IT company. He often attends interviews with his friend Sattai at top IT companies, but to no avail. One day, Pravin comes across a girl named Ramya(Sanchita Shetty) and falls in love with her. After some comic conversations and personal meetings, she accepts his proposal, and the marriage is also fixed. Meanwhile, Pravin notices something strange happening around him. One night, Pravin hears a strange voice stating that he would die in four days. To survive, he ordered Pravin to complete four tasks and asked him not to confess about this to anyone. The four tasks are, get a slap from an old lady without informing her about the task, save a girl from committing suicide, stop a couple from divorce, and shoot his girlfriend Ramya with a pistol, respectively. How Pravin completes all four tasks and manages to survive with Ramya is the rest of the story.

== Cast ==
- Azhar as Praveen
- Sanchita Shetty as Ramya
- Singapore Deepan as Sattaiyappan
- Yogi Babu as Aadhi
- Vazhakku En Muthuraman as Praveen's father
- Uma Padmanabhan as Praveen's mother
- Maya S. Krishnan as Dora
- Archana Chandhoke as Thaara
- Dr. Sharmila as TV show host
- Sumathi G. as Aadhi's wife
- Eden Kuriakose as Deenavyashini
- Lokesh Pop Aady as Ad agent
- KPY Ramar as Singer
- Vignesh Karthick in a special appearance as Praveen's friend
- Amir as dancer
- Sasikumar Sivalingam as one of the interviewer in the panel

== Production ==
A. R. Reihana announced that she would debut as a producer with a fantasy comedy film during July 2015 and revealed that newcomer Azhar and Sanchita Shetty would play the lead roles. Reihana picked Vignesh Karthick to direct the film, and revealed that she was motivated to become a producer in order to make sure her music is better picturised on screen. Vignesh Karthick had previously worked in different professions on television serials, while Azhar had worked as a radio jockey. The film was shot throughout late 2015 and 2016, with the title Yenda Thalaiyila Yenna Vekkala announced after production was completed.

== Soundtrack ==
The music was composed by the film's producer A. R. Reihana. The soundtrack album was released on 29 April 2017 through Divo.

Track listing
No.	Title	Lyrics	Singer(s)	Length
1.	"Imaikkamal Kangal"	Thava	Abhay Jodhpurkar, Saindhavi	3:47
2.	"Manathil"	Thyagarajan	Deepika Thyagarajan	1:30
3.	"Vechi Seiraan"	S. Madhan	A. R. Reihana, Mukesh Mohamed, Deepika Thyagarajan	3:38
4.	"Yenda Thalaiyila Yenna Vekkala"	Dharma	A. R. Reihana, Sajesan Vivekji	3:02
Total length:				11:40

== Critical reception ==
Navein Darshan of Cinema Express wrote, "the film shows no traces of fantasy or comedy till the halfway point, and though there are some laughs post interval, it's not enough to redeem it". Samayam gave the film a more positive review, rating it 3 stars out of 5. Ananda Vikatan wrote that, had the screenplay been well crafted and avoided the usual Tamil clichés, it would have been more entertaining.
