= Rakkuyil (TV series) =

Indian television series

- Also known as: രാക്കുയിൽ
- Genre: Soap opera
- Created by: Real Studio
- Developed by: Murali Nellanadu
- Written by: Murali Nellanadu/Lydia Paul
- Directed by: Manu Sudhakaran/ T.S.Saji
- Starring: Lydia Paul, Devika Nambiar
- Country of origin: India
- Original language: Malayalam
- No. of episodes: 328

Production
- Producer: Biju Praveen
- Cinematography: prince dass
- Editor: vishnu Pratheep
- Running time: 22 minutes

Original release
- Network: Mazhavil Manorama
- Release: 9 November 2020 – 12 March 2022

Related
- Sooryakanthi

Raakkuyil (transl.Nightingale) is an Indian television soap opera that airs on Mazhavil Manorama and streams on ManoramaMAX. It is an adaptation of Mayadevi's Novel Raakuyil on Malayala Manorama. However, from episode 125 onwards, the show deviated from the original novel and its story is written by Lydia Paul. Raakkuyil is narrated from the point of view of the central character Thulasi.

Apart from the original schedule the series is retelecasted twice a day in the channel at 2:30 am, 10 am IST respectively. The show timing was later shifted from 8.30 PM to 8.00 PM was also aired 7.00 PM initially. From late May 2021 the show was temporarily halted due to COVID-19 restrictions and from July 5, 2021 it was relaunched at 6.30 PM. From November 15, 2021 the show was moved to evening 6 pm slot.From January 24, 2022 the show was moved to morning 9 am(mon-sat).

== Cast ==
- Archana Nair (Episode 1-64) →Devika Nambiar (Episode 65-330) as Thulasi: Female Protogoinst, middle child of melepat family. Wife of Roy. Sister of Manasi and Nandu. Step mother of Emymol
  - A kind and beautiful women who is struggling to rebuild her family and who is also moving with a good relationship with her husband, Roy Alex. She is the second wife of Roy, who has a daughter, Emy. Who loves Thulasi a lot.
- Lydia Paul (Apsara) as Manasi :Former Antagonist elder daughter of melepat family. Former wife of Karali Chandran, Sister of Thulasi and Nandu, Sathyadev's wife
  - A bold, stern, kind and a beautiful women who is straggling to rebuild her family which was broke by her former husband Karali Chandran who Married Manasi but wishes to marry her sister Thulasi, with an aim to steal the wealth of Melepat family.
- Vishnu Prasad as Karali Chandran (dead) : Antagonist
  - Spoilt brat who cheats and marries Manasi but loves Thulasi who aims at destroying and taking over the wealth of Meleppattu Family.
- Renjith Menon as Adv.Sathyadev Varma, Manasi's Husband, Roy's friend, Lakshmi and Varma's Son, Gowri's Brother and Mithra Brother- In- law
- Ronson Vincent→Tom Mattel as CI Roy Alex Palathingal (dead) : Thulasi's husband, Emy mol's father, Eleena's former husband, Sathyadev's Friend and Manasi's Brother-in-law
- Baby Lakshya as Emymol, Daughter of Roy and Eleena
- Irine as Thara, Wife of Nandu
- Bindu Murali (Episode 1-42)→ Sindhu Varma (Episode 43-present) as Bhanumathi
  - Wife of Menon and mother of Thulasi, Manasi and Nandu. She is the younger sister of Bhaskaran.
- Akash Murali as Nandu
  - Youngest son of Menon and Bhanumathi who supports Thulasi
- Amboori Jayan as Karali Shivarajan
  - Father of Chandran. Who supports Manasi
- Karthika Kannan as Hemalatha, Sivarajan's second wife, who supports Manasi
- Sumi Rashik as Mrunalini, Chandran's second wife
- Naveen Kumar as Sunny : Roy's relative
- Mukundan as Puthezhathu Bhaskaran
  - Elder brother of Bhanu, husband of Syrandhri and father of Jayakrishnan. He hates Madhavan.
- Hemanth Kumar (Episode 1-42) →Niranjan Nair (Episode 43 -) as Jayakrishnan :
  - Son of Bhaskaran and Syrandhri who loves Thulasi and later married Shyla
- Uma Nair as Syrandhri
  - Wife of Bhaskaran, mother of Jayakrishnan who hates Meleppattu Family
- Sivaji Guruvayoor as Meleppattu Karunakaran Menon
  - A kind hearted rich businessman, husband of Bhanu and father of Manasi, Thulasi and Nandu. He hates Karali family and so Chandran
- Vindhuja Vikraman as Shyla
  - Jayakrishnan's wife
- Asha Nair as Sarala Balan
  - a.k.a. Teacheramma, wife of Balan and close friend of Bhanu
- ____ as Balan Maash
  - Aquantaince of Meleppattu Family
- Sali Prajith as Smitha
  - Housemaid of Karali family who maintains an illegitimate relationship with Chandran and hates Manasi who later marries Chandran.
- Thomas Kuriakose as Varma
  - Father of Indran, Gowri and Satyadev. father-in-law of Mithra Varma and Manasi.
- Ranju Lakshmi as Mithra Varma
  - Widow of Sathyadev's elder brother.
- Biju Bahuleyan as Shibu
- Kalyani Nair as Ashwani
- Swathi Thara as Eleena
- _____ as Satheesh
- Ann Mathews as Neha
- Darshana Unni as Lakshmi, Satyadev's mother
- Urmila Unni as Sujatha Teacher
- Murali Mohan as Narendra Babu
- Lal Mohan as Kiran
  - Friend of nandu
- _____ as Madhavan
  - Karukaran's elder brother
- Sajna Firoz as Anuradha
- Leela Manacaud as Kumbidiamma
- Sajith Sadasivan as Abhi
- Prarthana Krishna as Gouri
- Vijay Madhav as himself (Onam Special episode)

== Dubbed version ==
| Language | Title | Original release | Network(s) | Last aired |
|---|---|---|---|---|
| Tamil | Vanambadi வானம்பாடி | 22 May 2024 | Thanthi One | Ongoing |
