= Aayusu Nooru =

1987 film

- Title card
- Directed by: Ponmani Rajan
- Written by: Ponmani Rajan
- Produced by: M. D. Kalairajan
- Starring: Pandiarajan; Pandiyan; Ranjini
- Music by: T. Rajendar
- Production company: Sampath Creations
- Release date: 20 November 1987
- Country: India
- Language: Tamil

Aayusu Nooru (transl. 100 years of life) is a 1987 Indian Tamil-language film written and directed by Ponmani Rajan. The film stars Pandiarajan, Pandiyan and Ranjini. It was released on 20 November 1987.

== Plot ==
In the village of Ammapatti, Azhagammal toils as a laborer under the oppressive rule of an arrogant landlady, citing her status as an orphan. Azhagammal resides with her elderly grandmother. In the neighboring village of Melappatti, Subramani, the son of a cloth shop owner, travels to Ammapatti on his bicycle to peddle his wares. Initially, Azhagammal and Subramani engage in a series of heated altercations. However, after several encounters, Azhagammal develops an affection for Subramani, who gallantly saves her from the clutches of two miscreants. Dr. Rathinam, a physician, visits the village and establishes a clinic with the landlord's assistance. Witnessing Azhagammal's humiliation at the hands of the landlady, Dr. Rathinam is reminded of his own painful past as an orphan. This shared experience fosters a deep empathy for Azhagammal within him. In a shocking revelation, it is discovered that Azhagammal is, in fact, the landlord's illegitimate daughter. As the truth comes to light, Azhagammal learns of her true lineage, forever altering her understanding of herself.

Dr. Rathinam, oblivious to Azhagammal's romance with Subramani, harbors a one-sided love for her. He offers Azhagammal sage advice on love, subtly hinting at his own feelings. However, Azhagammal innocently interprets his words as applicable to her relationship with Subramani. As a symbol of their love, Subramani and Azhagammal tattoo each other's names on their hands. Azhagammal's biological father, the landlord, arranges for her to marry a man involved in illicit liquor production. This development shocks both Dr. Rathinam and Subramani. A brawl ensues, during which Dr. Rathinam valiantly defends Azhagammal's honor. Dr. Rathinam successfully resolves a romantic dispute between an elderly couple, earning Azhagammal's praise. Misinterpreting her gratitude as a sign of reciprocated love raises Dr. Rathinam's hopes.

Meanwhile, Subramani's parents search for a suitable bride for their son and plan to visit Azhagammal the following day. Subramani informs Azhagammal of this development, and in her excitement, she accidentally ingests sleeping pills, mistakenly believing them to be skin fairness tablets. Dr. Rathinam, who had been attending to an emergency patient in Sokkampatti, returns to find Azhagammal unconscious due to excessive pill consumption. Perumal, a polygenic villager, misinterprets the situation, assuming Dr. Rathinam is having an affair with Azhagammal, and promptly informs the other villagers. The village panchayat convenes, and the villagers, misled by Perumal's accusations, decide to marry Dr. Rathinam to Azhagammal forcibly. This shocking turn of events is witnessed by Subramani and his family, who are left questioning Azhagammal's character. Devastated by the humiliation, Azhagammal contemplates taking her own life by consuming poison but is stopped by Subramani.

The next morning, Azhagammal goes missing. At the marriage hall, the villagers continue to slander Azhagammal's reputation. However, the landlord intervenes, acknowledging Azhagammal as his daughter and vouching for her purity. He further clarifies that Dr. Rathinam was out of town in Sokkampatti when the accusations were made. The landlord reveals that he had remained silent during the panchayat meeting in hopes of securing a marriage between Azhagammal and Dr. Rathinam. Upon realizing that Azhagammal is no longer an orphan and that she has found love with someone else, Dr. Rathinam nobly decides to step aside and allow Azhagammal to marry the one she loves. As they search for Azhagammal, they discover that she is preparing to elope with Subramani. Ultimately, Subramani and Azhagammal tie the knot, and Dr. Rathinam departs from the village.

== Cast ==
- Pandiarajan as Dr. Rathinam
- Pandiyan as Subramani
- Ranjini as Azhagammal
- Senthamarai as a landlord, Azhagammal's biological father
- Senthil as Perumal
- Gandhimathi as Sembu, Subramani's mother
- Kovai Sarala as Chellamma, Perumal's third wife
- Disco Shanti as a dancer in the song
- Kollangudi Karuppayee as a villager
- Pasi Narayanan as Perusu, a customer
- Singamuthu as Muthu, a tea stall owner
- Vellai Subbaiah as a deaf villager
- Nellai Siva as a villager
- Bayilvan Ranganathan
- Omakuchi Narasimhan

== Soundtrack ==
Soundtrack was composed by T. Rajendar, who also wrote the lyrics.

Track listing
No.	Title	Singer(s)	Length
1.	"Aavani Masathula"	Malaysia Vasudevan, S. Janaki
2.	"Brahmadevan"	Mano, K. S. Chithra
3.	"Kummi Adikkira"	Gangai Amaran
4.	"Etri Vaitha"	P. Jayachandran
5.	"Chinna Ponnu"	Mano, Vani Jairam

== Release and reception ==
The film was originally slated to release on Diwali. The Indian Express wrote "Aayusu Nooru is one of those unpretentious films based on rural subject; [..] There are poignant situations that the director has handled with some degree of competence".
