= Azhar (actor) =

Indian actor

- Born: Chennai, Tamil Nadu
- Occupations: Actor, television host
- Years active: 2014–present

Azhar is an Indian actor and television host who has appeared in Tamil language films. After making his film debut in the Tamil film Ninaithathu Yaaro (2014), he has been in films including Yenda Thalaiyila Yenna Vekkala (2018) and Saaral (2019).

== Career ==
Azhar completed an electronic communication degree in 2007, before working in radio and television companies. He made his film debut in Ninaithathu Yaaro (2014), portraying one of the four lead roles. Azhar was then cast in the lead role of Yenda Thalaiyila Yenna Vekkala (2018), a comedy drama co-starring Sanchita Shetty, which was produced by A. R. Reihana. The film opened to negative reviews.

He later appeared in films such as Saaral (2019) and Kichi Kichi (2022).

== Personal life ==
Azhar got married in January 2019.

== Filmography ==
=== Films ===
Year	Film	Role	Notes
2014	Ninaithathu Yaaro	Saravanan	
2018	Yenda Thalaiyila Yenna Vekkala	Praveen	
2019	Saaral		
2022	Kichi Kichi		

Television

- Kalakka Povathu Yaaru?
- Kalakka Povathu Yaaru? Champions
