= Devika Nambiar =

Indian actress

- Citizenship: Indian
- Occupations: actress; host; classical dancer
- Years active: 2011–2022
- Spouse: Vijay Madhav (m. 2022)
- Relatives: Sreelatha Namboothiri (aunt); Kumari Thankam (great-aunt)

Devika Nambiar is an Indian actress and television presenter who appears in Malayalam television and films, along with a few Tamil films.

== Filmography ==
=== Films ===
Year	Film	Role	Language	Notes	Ref.
2011	Madhyapanam Arogyatinu Haanikaram		Malayalam		
2011	Kalabha Mazha	Malavika	Malayalam		
2011	Gulf Returns	Sumayyah	Malayalam		
2013	One	Devika	Malayalam		
2013	Mayil Paarai	Mayil	Tamil		
2014	Parayan Baaki Vechathu	Gopika	Malayalam		
2014	To Let Ambadi Talkies	Anna	Malayalam		
2014	Vasanthathinte Kanal Vazhikalil	Nandhini	Malayalam		
2015	Kuduma Kalaham Nooram Divasam	Raziya	Malayalam		
2015	Sneha Kadal	Rameeza	Malayalam		
2015	Koottukudumbam	Indhu	Malayalam		
2016	Kattappanayile Rithwik Roshan	Annamma	Malayalam		
2018	Vikadakumaran	Beena	Malayalam		
2019	Thanka Bhasma Kuriyitta Thamburatty	Sindhu	Malayalam		
2019	Ganesha Meendum Santhipom	Jennifer	Tamil		

=== Television ===
Year	Show	Role	Channel	Notes	Ref.
2011–2012	Parinayam	Krishnaveni	Mazhavil Manorama		
2013	Bhima Jewels Comedy Festival	Host	Mazhavil Manorama	also title song dancer	
2014	Cinemaa Chirimaa	Host	Mazhavil Manorama		
2014–2015	Balamani	Balamani	Mazhavil Manorama		
2015	Indian Voice Grand Final (Season 2)	Host	Mazhavil Manorama		
2015	Hitler Muthal Bhaskar Vare	Host	Mazhavil Manorama		
2015	Comedy Super Nite	Host	Flowers TV		
2015–16	Chef Master Junior	Host	Kaumudy TV		
2020–2022	Rakkuyil	Thulasi	Mazhavil Manorama		
2021	Star Magic	Contestant	Flowers TV		
2022	Oru Chiri Iru Chiri Bumper Chiri	Host	Mazhavil Manorama		
2022	Bumper Chiri Aaghosham	Host	Mazhavil Manorama		
2022	Mazhavil Chiri Awards 2022	Host	Mazhavil Manorama		

==== Special appearances ====
Year	Show	Role	Channel	Notes	Ref.
2012	Palpayasavumayi Paramparasundarimar	Guest/Cookery presenter	Mazhavil Manorama		
2014	Invide Ingananu Bhai	Guest	Mazhavil Manorama		
2014	Onnum Onnum Moonu	Guest	Mazhavil Manorama		
2014	Hello Namasthey	Guest	Mazhavil Manorama		
2014	B Positive	Guest	Kairali TV		
2015	Vanitha	Guest	Mazhavil Manorama		
2018	Annies Kitchen	Guest	Amrita TV		
2021	Oru Chiri Iru Chiri Bumper Chiri	Guest	Mazhavil Manorama		
2021	Red Carpet	Mentor	Amrita TV		
2022	Panam Tharum Padam	Contestant	Mazhavil Manorama		
2022	Comedy Thillana	Herself	Kairali TV		
2022	My Life My Choice	Herself	Mazhavil Manorama		
2022	Television Tharangalude Samsthana Sammelanam	Herself	Flowers		
2022	Parayam Nedam	Participant	Amrita TV		

=== Webseries ===
Year	Film	Role	Language	Notes	Ref.
2021	Kochi Heist		Malayalam	YouTube Webseries	

=== Music videos ===
Year	Film	Role	Language	Notes	Ref.
2012	Ashiyana		Malayalam	Album song	
2012	Ente Khalbil Poothoru Poove		Malayalam	Mappilapattu	
2013	Muthu Habeebi Monjathi	Fazila	Malayalam	Album song	
2013	Tajmahal		Malayalam	Album song	
2019	Nee Vadalle Poove		Malayalam	Album	
2019	Sreerama Pahima		Malayalam	Devotional song	
2021	Vaakacharth		Malayalam	Devotional song	
2021	Kanikaanum Neram		Malayalam	Devotional song	
