= Kabadi Kabadi (2001 film) =

2001 film by Pandiarajan

- Directed by: Pandiarajan
- Written by: K. Bhagyaraj
- Produced by: Poornima Bhagyaraj
- Starring: Pandiarajan; Sangeetha
- Cinematography: K. Nithya
- Music by: Deva
- Production company: Saranya Cine Creations
- Release date: 28 September 2001
- Country: India
- Language: Tamil

Kabadi Kabadi is a 2001 Indian Tamil-language romantic comedy film written by K. Bhagyaraj and directed by Pandiarajan. Produced by Poornima Bhagyaraj, the film stars Pandiarajan and Sangeetha, while Karan and Manivannan appear in supporting roles. Featuring music composed by Deva and lyrics written by Vairamuthu, the film was released on 28 September 2001. The core concept of the movie is based on the 2000 English movie Meet the Parents. The 2004 Hindi movie Mujhse Shaadi Karogi was loosely based on this movie.

== Plot ==
Pandian comes to Chennai to work as an assistant manager in the Velvette shampoo company. In the bus he meets R Sundarrajan. Sundarrajan tricks Pandian into staying awake for the entire duration of the bus's overnight travel time whereas Sundarrajan peacefully sleeps. Sundarrajan irritates him even more by saying the next time Pandian takes a bus ride he should inform Sundarrajan, so that Sundarrajan can again use Pandian as an unpaid guard for his belongings. Pandian joins the company and to his surprise he finds Sundarrajan to be one of the Watchmen at the company. Pandian takes revenge by assigning Sundarrajan to night duty for three winter months.

Pandian then finds a rental house. He reduces the rent to a very low amount by convincing the house owner by telling him that he would help out in menial household tasks and work for free for a few hours in the owner's cycle repair shop.

Pandian also meets Sangeetha, the heroine, who lives in the house opposite to his. He promptly falls in love with her. He tries to get the local petty shop owner Manivannan to introduce him to Sangeetha. Manivannan calls Sangeetha to the shop and introduces Pandian to her. Just before he shakes her hand, he sees an old man get into an accident with his scooter. A small kid falls in front of the scooter and falls down. Pandian wanting to make a good first impression, slaps the old man. But the man turns out to be the Sangeetha's father. Sangeetha understandably gets very upset and scolds Pandian.

The next day Pandian explains to Manivannan how he couldn't have guessed how the guy who he hit could be the heroine's father. He reasons the man was so ugly looking like coal and the heroine was so beautiful looking like Bangalore tomatoes and there was no way the man could be her father. Unbeknownst to him the heroine is actually standing behind Pandian when he says this. Now she gets very angry as he has questioned her Patrentage.

To add to Pandian's woes further, his grandma arrives from the village and upon hearing Pandian's love troubles decides to take matters in her own hand. Since her eyesight is not good, she misunderstands the heroine's mother to be the heroine and asks the mother to marry Pandian. This also irritates the heroine.

Another parallel thread is how a group of inept rowdies think Pandian as a big shot and claims him to be their leader when Pandian gets drunk and unwittingly beats up a big local rowdy. His association with these rowdies also irritates the heroine.

Because Pandian couldn't make a direct good impression on her, he tries to help her anonymously. Every time she faces a monetary problem Pandian takes money from his savings and spends it for her. He even spends his savings for his grandma's eye surgery on the heroine's needs such as her college fees.

Now enters Karan. Since Pandian pays very less amount as rent, the house owner forces Pandian to take upon Karan as roommate. Karan is a fraud. He steals Pandian's certificates and secures a job. He also sees Sangeetha and tries to woo her. He impresses Sangeetha and her parents too. Whatever bad Karan does, it falls on Pandian, bringing his respect and name even more down with the heroine. Whatever good Pandian does, it seems like Sangeetha misunderstands it and thinks the good is done by Karan.

R Sundarrajan actually turns out to be Sangeetha's uncle. Sundarrajan discovers that Pandian is in love with Sangeetha. He makes Pandian make him the day shift Watchman again. He also uses Pandian to get money, eat at high class restaurants and other benefits. Pandian begrudgingly allows all this so that Sundarrajan could get Sangeetha fall in love with him. But these efforts also fail.

When Pandian almost gives up on his love, luck comes in the form of the comedic rowdy gang who adopted Pandian as their leader. They want to show some gratitude as Pandian beating up the old big don has boosted the revenues for these small time rowdies. But they also mistakenly think Pandian loves Sangeetha's mother and so they kidnap her. Pandian mentions that he actually loves the daughter. The rowdies again kidnap Sangeetha. Upon hearing this, all the people in Pandian's housing colony tries to rescue the two women from the clutches of the inept rowdies in their customary rundown factory which they use for kidnapping and other illegal activities. Karan uses this confusion to try to marry Sangeetha but she refuses and opens up the truth. She actually loved Pandian all along and she knew all the good things were done by him. She also knew Karan was undeservingly taking the credit due for Pandian. She wanted Pandian to come out of his shyness, insecurities and confidence issues to propose to her. For that reason she irritated Pandian by her friendship with Karan. She basically had used Karan to get Pandian out of his shell. Karan, obviously as a villain, tries to force her into marrying him. Pandian, upon hearing the heroine's admission of love, gets confidence and beats up Karan and saves Sangeetha. Pandian and Sangeetha then happily marry.

== Cast ==
- Pandiarajan as Pandian
- Sangeetha as Mythili
- Karan as Sivaprakash
- Manivannan as Ayyavannan
- Loose Mohan as Periannan
- R. Sundarrajan as Arumugam
- Vennira Aadai Moorthy as Landlord
- Chitra as Landlord
- Kollangudi Karuppayee as Pandian's mother
- K. Rajan

== Production ==
The film was announced in mid-1997 by Pandiarajan, who revealed that the film would be written by K. Bhagyaraj and be produced by Poornima Bhagyaraj. The film was delayed owing the financial problems for the producers.

== Soundtrack ==
Music composed by Deva

Song	Singers	Lyrics
Kannu Kutti	Mano, Meera Krishnan	Vairamuthu
Pappali Pazhame	Mano, Sujatha	Vairamuthu
Top Tenla Dhool	Deva, Krishnaraj	Vairamuthu
Kanne Unnai	Mano, Sujatha	Vairamuthu
Kabadi Kabadi	Samsuddin	Vairamuthu

== Reception ==
A critic from The Hindu wrote "Comedy is the main line in Saranya Cine Creations's Kabadi Kabadi and all the scenes are made in a lighter vein. But at times one needs a little more of drama and sentimental scenes to move the film to a higher plane". Sadly, for instance, afew of the scenes reminds and takes us back to the 1992 hit film, Thirumadhi Palanichamy, like the scene in which Manivannan introduces Pandiyarajan to Sangeetha, and he slaps her father out of momentary rage.
