= Help (2011 film) =

Indian short film

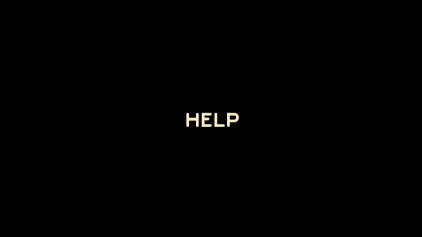
- Title card
- Directed by: Pandiarajan
- Written by: Pandiarajan
- Produced by: Pandiarajan
- Starring: Delhi Ganesh; Mohan Raman; Devipriya; Kishore
- Cinematography: Ashok Rajan
- Edited by: B. Lenin
- Music by: Srikanth Deva
- Production company: 24f Company
- Release dates: 20 May 2011 (ArtDeco Film Festival); 14 July 2018 (YouTube)
- Running time: 11 minutes
- Country: India
- Language: English

Help is a 2011 Indian English-language short film directed by Pandiarajan and starring Delhi Ganesh, Mohan Raman and Devipriya. The film was notably the only film from Asia amongst the 55 films showcased at the ArtDeco Film Festival 2011 in Sao Paulo, Brazil.

== Plot ==
At the Chennai International Airport, a security officer, Chiranjeevi, calls another officer working in customs about a suspicious luggage. They stop the woman who owns the luggage. While searching through her luggage, they find a sex toy and mistake her for a sex addict and ask if she has a husband. She tells that they he died and that she is a mother. Her disabled son is shown in the background and the mother explains how she takes care of him and was unable to help him from his dissatisfaction from not being able to engage in any sexual activity and bought the sex toy for him.

== Cast ==
- Delhi Ganesh as an airport security officer
- Mohan Raman as an airport security officer
- Devipriya as the disabled man's mother
- Kishore

== Production ==
The short film was initially planned to be shot in Tamil but since some words sounded harsh, Pandiarajan decided to make it in English. This is his first short film in English as his previous short films (Magan, Iru Thuligal) were in Tamil. His assistant directors helped the actors with pronouncing the dialogues. For the role of the disabled man's mother, Pandiarajan asked several actresses who denied the role before Sakthivel Sarkar, who directed him in Mama Maaple, suggested Devipriya. Srikanth Deva composed the film's music in a single night while B. Lenin edited the film within 45 minutes.

== Release ==
The short film was showcased at the ArtDeco Film Festival 2011 as part of the Digital Capture section on 20 May 2011 and competed in five categories: best short film, direction, screenplay, acting (male and female) and the audience's favourite film. After the festival screenings, it was released on the Behindwoods YouTube channel in 2018. As of 2020, the short film had 30 million viewers.

== Accolades ==
Devipriya was nominated at the ArtDeco Film Festival 2011 for Best Actress. She also received an award from a Bangalore film festival.
