= Kalabha Mazha =

- Directed by: P Sukumenon
- Written by: B. Kiran Kumar
- Produced by: Suku Nair
- Starring: Krisha; Devika; Thilakan; Mamukkoya; Cochin Haneefa; Jagathy Sreekumar; Indrans
- Cinematography: M. J. Radhakrishnan
- Edited by: P. C. Mohanan
- Music by: Rajeev ONV; Mankada Damodaran
- Production company: Aswathy Aarts
- Distributed by: Aswathy Sai Release
- Release date: 29 April 2011
- Country: India
- Language: Malayalam

Kalabha Mazha is a 2011 Malayalam film directed by P Sukumenon, starring Krisha and Radhika in the lead roles.

== Plot ==
Kalabha Mazha tells the friendly relationship between a Hindu and a Muslim family. Madhava Menon who worked in the All India Radio always respects other religions and works for the upliftment of the society. Malavika is the eldest daughter of Madhava Menon. She is betrothed to Unnikrishnan. She is more than a sister to her two younger siblings, since their mother had died when they were quite young. Menon, is regretful that he hasn't been able to save much money for his children, and the family finds it hard, to make both ends meet, as days pass by. There is a Muslim family staying nearby, headed by Kunjali. His son-in-law, on a job in the Middle East, had been missing for about six long years. Malavika's sister, falls for a film director, and soon realizes that her decision was wrong. Her brother on the other hand, takes up a job at a local bank, and finds himself having transformed into a goon. Later, Malavika bumps into her sister's absconding lover, and almost meets with the same fate in his hands.

== Cast ==
- Krishna as Unnikrishnan
- Devika Nambiar as Malavika
- Thilakan as Madhava Menon
- Mamukkoya as Kunjali
- Cochin Haneefa
- Jagathy Sreekumar as Vilwadiri Iyyer
- Indrans
- Saina Krishna
- Kalaranjini as Kamashi
- Mohan Kartha
- Hanna Yazir
- Baby Gandhika
