= Gopala Gopala (1996 film) =

- Title card
- Directed by: Pandiarajan
- Written by: Pandiarajan
- Produced by: M. Kajamydeen; V. Gnanavelu; Jayaprakash
- Starring: Pandiarajan; Khushbu
- Cinematography: K. Nithya
- Edited by: V. Rajagopal; S. Govindaswamy
- Music by: Deva
- Production company: Roja Combines
- Release date: 6 December 1996
- Running time: 155 minutes
- Country: India
- Language: Tamil

Gopala Gopala is a 1996 Indian Tamil-language comedy drama film written and directed by Pandiarajan. The film stars himself and Khushbu, with music composed by Deva and ran for 100 days. The film was remade in Malayalam in 2000 as Mister Butler and in Telugu in 1998 as Suprabhatam.

== Plot ==
Gopalakrishnan, a clever cook from Coimbatore, moves to an apartment in Chennai. He becomes quickly popular and appreciated among the apartment's women, however, their husbands get jealous of Gopalakrishnan. Meanwhile, he falls in love with Usha. He decides to marry her with the support of his neighbours. After the marriage, Usha has just learned that Gopalakrishnan was already married. Gopalakrishnan had got married with a girl but she was already pregnant and she eloped with her lover that very evening. Gopalakrishnan informed Usha's father of all these details, but Usha's father did not convey it to Usha because he thought it to be irrelevant. Usha, unaware of these details, is upset thinking that Gopalakrishnan tried to cheat her, and refuses to live with him. Usha's grandmother fuels Usha's mistrust towards Gopalakrishnan because the grandmother does not like Gopalakrishnan generally. Later, Gopalakrishnan finds a forsaken baby (by his ex-wife) in a dustbin and leaves the baby to an orphanage. Gopalakrishnan's father, an army officer, comes to live with his son and tries to help his son to win back Usha's heart. After a series of misunderstandings, Usha finally realises the honesty and good-naturedness of Gopalakrishnan and they reunite.

== Cast ==
- Pandiarajan as Gopalakrishnan and Usha's grandfather
- Khushbu as Usha
- Manivannan as Gopalakrishnan's father
- Janagaraj as Kuzhanthaivel
- Chithra as Meenakshi, Kuzhanthaivel's wife
- Vennira Aadai Moorthy as Sundaram
- Jyothi Meena as Annakili, Sundaram's wife
- Charle as Chettiar
- Kovai Sarala as Valliammai, Chettiar's wife
- Malaysia Vasudevan as Usha's father
- Jayanthi as Usha's mother
- Anju as Fathima
- Loose Mohan
- Kollangudi Karuppayee as Usha's grandmother
- Paandu as Chinna
- Sempuli Jegan
- Kumarimuthu
- Jaguar Thangam as Gold
- Sindhu as Contestant on the reality show (guest appearance)
- Pandiyan as Contestant on the reality show (guest appearance)

== Soundtrack ==
The soundtrack was composed by Deva, with lyrics written by Vairamuthu.

Track listing
No.	Title	Singer(s)	Length
1.	"Enna Annaikki"	Deva, Chorus	4:11
2.	"Kanna Nee Varuvai"	Anuradha Sriram, Ishrath, Meera Krishnan	5:24
3.	"Mr India"	Mano	4:19
4.	"Thenkasi Mamanukku"	Shahul Hameed, Swarnalatha	3:51
5.	"Yuddhathil"	S. P. Balasubrahmanyam, K. S. Chithra	4:27
Total length:			22:12

== Reception ==
R. P. R. of Kalki praised Pandiarajan for making a full-length comedy and succeeded in making people laugh and this film is a good example of screenplay which does not makes the viewer bore anywhere.
