= Manaivi Ready =

- Directed by: Pandiarajan
- Written by: Pandiarajan
- Produced by: Pandiarajan
- Starring: Pandiarajan; Sinthamani
- Cinematography: Ashok Kumar
- Edited by: V. Rajagopal; P. Mohan Raj
- Music by: Ilaiyaraaja
- Production company: Ratnam Art Movies
- Release date: January 1987
- Running time: 109 minutes
- Country: India
- Language: Tamil

Manaivi Ready (transl. Wife is Ready) is a 1987 Indian Tamil-language comedy film, produced and directed by Pandiarajan. The film stars Pandiarajan and Debashree Roy, with K. A. Thangavelu, R. S. Manohar and Manorama in supporting roles. Roy was credited as Sinthamani. It was her only film in Tamil.

== Plot ==
The movie presents Radha as a high school student who is mischievous and often gets into trouble. Radha's father is a police officer who wishes his son to be a musician like his grandfather and wants to feature his son's violin skills. One day, Radha and his friends attend their friend's sister's wedding far in a village. In a sudden turn of events, the bridegroom (Chintamani's aunt's son) runs away after winning a lottery. Radha empathizes with Chintamani and eventually marries her.

Radha's father is shocked to hear the news of his son's wedding. Chintamani is given household duties, preparing Radha for his high school. Radha's teacher, who resides in the same apartment, warns Radha's father to postpone violin staging as Radha is interested more in his married life. Radha's father makes him and Chintamani promise to postpone their sexual life until after he masters the violin.

However, Radha is unable to control himself and approaches Chintamani with sexual intentions, but she denies his advances. An irritated Radha goes to a brothel. Police raid the brothel and Radha tries to escape, but injures himself in the hip.

Radha undergoes surgery. Chintamani makes a lot of offerings at temples. Meanwhile, Radha consults the doctor to clarify his status regarding his fertility. The doctor assures him. Radha decorates and arranges his hospital room for wedding consummation. After visiting Radha, Chintamani's aunt gets a wrong message from the watchman about Radha's fertility that he would not have an heir.

Back in their village, Chintamani's aunt and father decide to remarry Chintamani to her aunt's son. Radha is discharged from hospital and later practices his violin. Chintamani is forced to remarry. During the ceremony, Chintamani realizes she is pregnant and reveals she had her consummation with her husband in the hospital. This stops the remarriage ceremony. Radha performs well at his violin performance. Later, Radha and Chintamani reunite.

== Cast ==
- Pandiarajan as Radha
- Sinthamani as Chintamani
- K. A. Thangavelu as Thangappan
- R. S. Manohar as Radha's father
- Pasi Narayanan as Tamil teacher
- K. K. Soundar as Chintamani's father
- Manorama as Chintamani's aunt
- Kumarimuthu
- Sivaraman as Postman
- MLA Thangaraj
- Pratap K. Pothen (Guest appearance) as Doctor – Voice by S. N. Surendar

== Soundtrack ==
All songs were written by Vaali and composed by Ilaiyaraaja.

Title	Singer(s)	Duration
"Saan Pillai"	Ilaiyaraaja, S. Janaki	4:47
"Pallavan Odura"	Malaysia Vasudevan	4:33
"Varuga"	Deepan Chakravarthy, Rajeswari	4:26
"Udambu Ippo"	S. P. Balasubrahmanyam, S. Janaki	5:01
"Unna Vitaa"	Ilaiyaraaja	4:26

== Reception ==
In 2014, Deepika Ramesh of Silverscreen India called Manaivi Ready a rare Tamil film to employ "classroom jokes to good effect".
