= Kollangudi Karuppayee =

Tamil folk singer (1925/1926–2025)

- Born: 1925 – 14 June 2025; Kollangudi,Sivaganga district, Tamil Nadu, India
- Died: 14 June 2025 (aged 99–100)
- Occupation: Folk Singer
- Spouse: Chellaiyya
- Awards: Kalaimamani Award (1992)

Kollangudi Karuppayee (1925 – 14 June 2025) was an Indian Tamil folk singer who also performed in films.

== Career ==
Karuppayee is considered one of the pioneers of Tamil folk music; as the first of her genre and background to perform in films, she served as an inspiration for many other folk artists. She started her career as a performer on All India Radio about thirty years before her foray into films. She was a recipient of the prestigious Kalaimamani award for her contributions to music.

== Death ==
Karuppayee died at her home in Kollangudi village, Sivaganga district on 14 June 2025, at the age of 99.

== Awards ==
- 1992: Received title of Kalaimamani Award by the Government of Tamil Nadu, which is the highest state honour in the field of Arts

== Filmography ==
=== In Film ===
Year	Film
1985	Aan Paavam
1987	Aayusu Nooru
1987	Yettiku Potti
1996	Gopala Gopala
2001	Kabadi Kabadi

=== As Singer ===
Year	Song	Film
1985	Peraandi	Aan Paavam
1985	Otti Vandha	Aan Paavam
1985	Koothu Pakka	Aan Paavam
1985	Chaaya Cheelai	Aan Paavam
1985	Arasapatti	Aan Paavam
1987	Enga Ooru Nalla Ooru	Yettiku Potti
1997	Kananguruvi kootukullae	Aahaa Enna Porutham
