= Kadhal Munnetra Kazhagam =

2019 Indian drama film by Manicka Sathya

- Directed by: Manicka Sathya
- Produced by: Malarkodi Murugan
- Starring: Prithvi Rajan; Chandini Tamilarasan
- Cinematography: Harish Krishnan
- Edited by: Suresh Urs
- Music by: P. C. Shivan
- Production company: Bluehills Productions
- Release date: 5 June 2019
- Running time: 118 minutes
- Country: India
- Language: Tamil

Kadhal Munnetra Kazhagam (transl. Love Progress Federation) is a 2019 Indian Tamil-language drama film directed by Manicka Sathya. It stars Prithvi Rajan and Chandini Tamilarasan in the lead roles, alongside Singampuli and Ganja Karuppu in supporting roles. Featuring music composed by P. C. Shivan, the film was released on 10 May 2019.

== Cast ==
- Prithvi Rajan as Sethu
- Chandini Tamilarasan as Teacher Meera
- Siva Senathipathi
- Singampuli as Kottaisaamy
- Ganja Karuppu as Karmegham
- Shanmugasundaram as President Panchayat
- M. R. Kishore Kumar
- Nadhaswaram Muneesraja
- Hello Kandasamy
- Munish Raja

== Production ==
A period drama set in 1985, the debutant director Manicka Sathya cast Chandini Tamilarasan and Prithvi Rajan in the lead roles. Prithvi was selected to play a villager who is a fan of the actor Karthik, while Chandini played a school teacher courted by eight men.

The film began production in mid-2016, with Chandini referencing actress Shobana's old films for her character. The shoot of the film took place largely around the Cuddalore district, with a song getting shot in Ooty. As several songs by Ilaiyaraaja were used in scenes during the film, the makers sought permission from the composer to include them. The makers readied the film for release in 2019, several years after the film was completed.

== Soundtrack ==
The film's soundtrack was composed by P. C. Shivan.

- "Kadhal Munnetra Kazhagam" - Jayamoorthy, Kavitha Gopi
- "Rajini Kamalu" - P. C. Shivan
- "Onnakanda Nenjukkulla" - Ajaey Shravan, Namitha Babu
- "Navvaapazha Kannazhagi" - Anthony Daasan, Priya Subramanian
- "Thoduvaanam" - Ganesh Venkataraman, Rita

== Release ==
The film had a low profile opening across Tamil Nadu on 10 May 2019. A critic from The New Indian Express noted "Kadhal Munnetra Kazhagam is not romantic, let alone be progressive" and that "it is just a mish-mash of self-congratulatory messages and nods to the sexism rampant in Tamil films, as though it were something worth cherishing."
