= P. K. Medini =

Revolutionary Singer

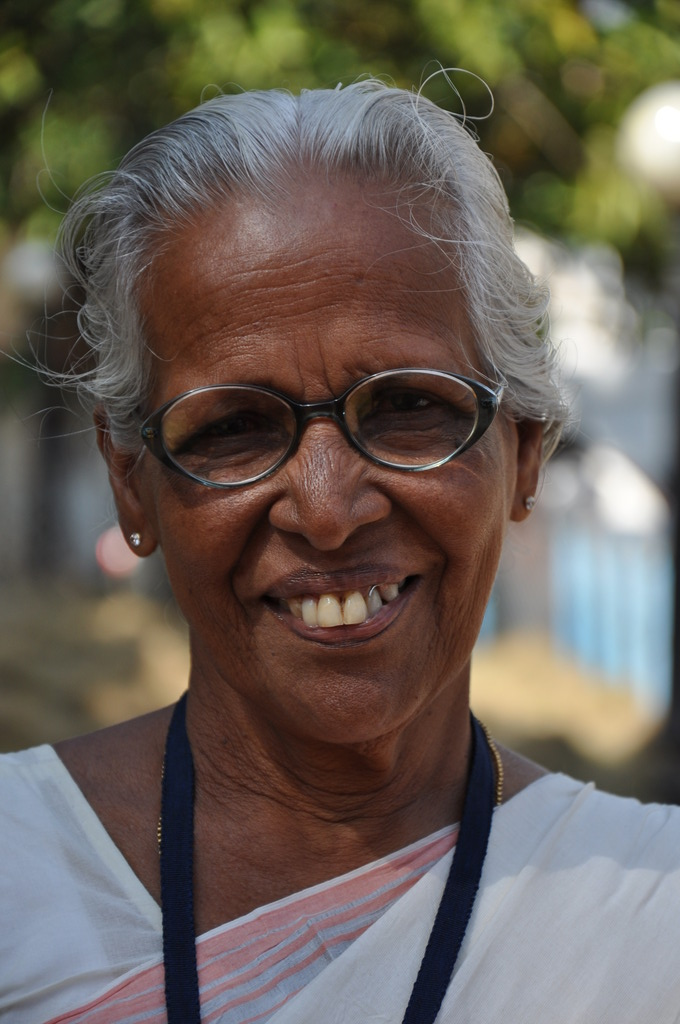
PK Medini

P. K. Medini is a revolutionary singer, musician, stage artist, one of the few living freedom fighters of India, a participant of the historical Punnapra-Vayalar uprising, a leader of Communist party of India and a renowned social activist of Kerala.

Medini is a recipient of the Kerala Sangeetha Nataka Akademi Award (1999).

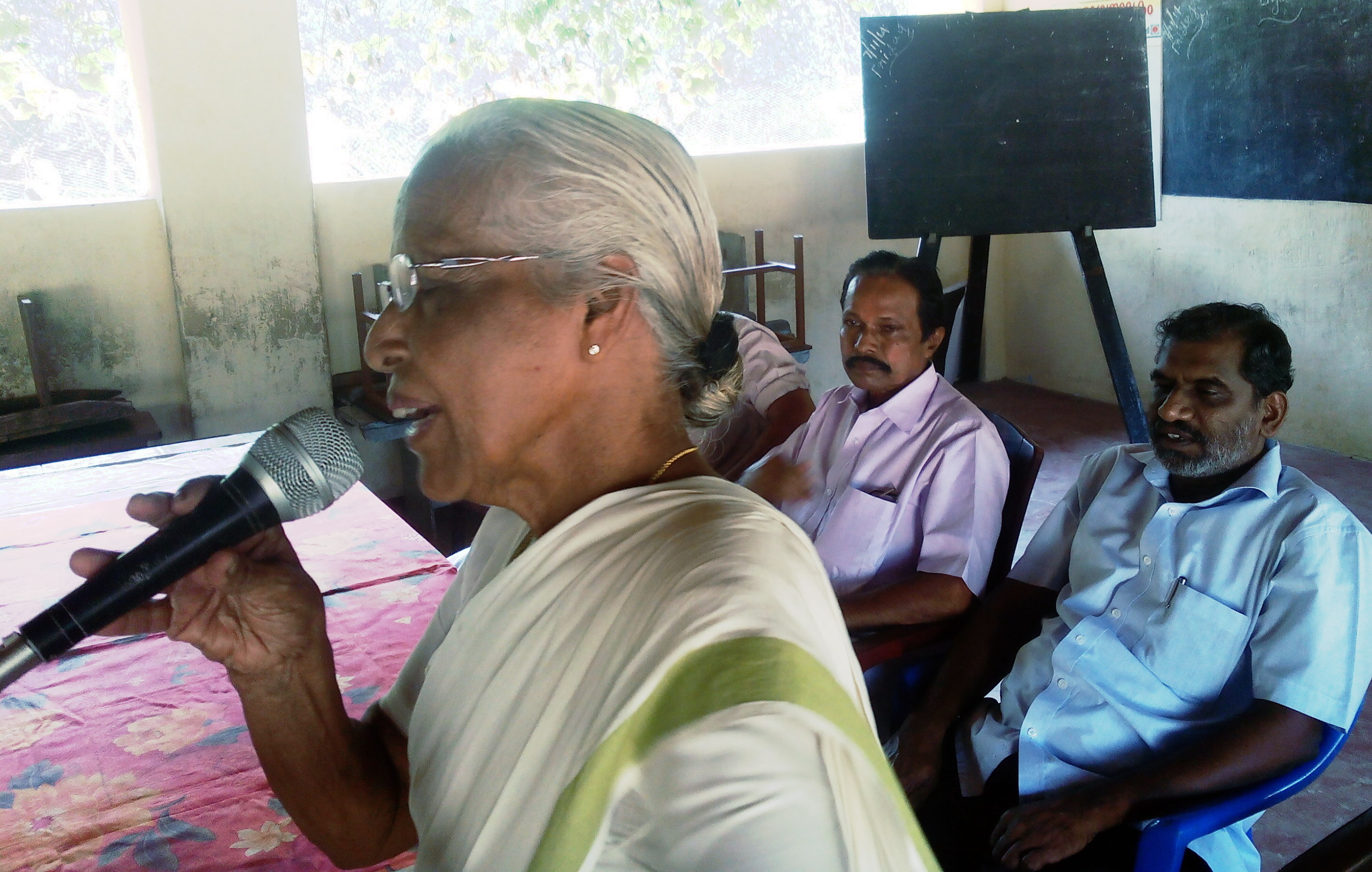
P. K. Medini during a public performance
