= A. R. Reihana =

Indian playback singer and composer

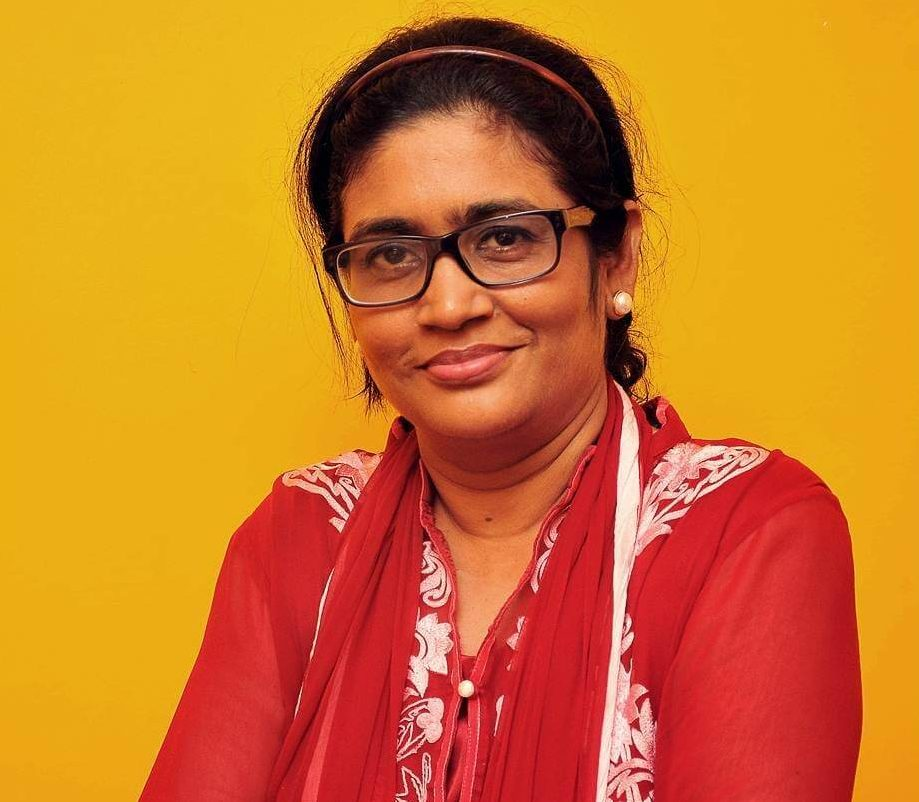
- Born: Madras, Tamil Nadu, India
- Other name: Raihanah
- Occupations: Singer; composer
- Spouse: G. Venkatesh
- Children: G. V. Prakash Kumar; Bhavani Sre
- Father: R. K. Shekhar
- Relatives: A. R. Rahman (brother)
- Family: R. K. Shekhar family
- Musical career
- Genres: Filmi; pop; Indian folk music; devotional
- Instruments: Vocals; Violin
- Years active: 2000–present
- Labels: Think Music; Muzik 247; Sony Music; Divo; Trend Music

Allah Rakha Reihana is an Indian playback singer and film composer. She is the sister of A. R. Rahman and the mother of G. V. Prakash Kumar and Bhavani Sre. Her first debut song was "Malai Malai" from the movie Chocklet, which was composed by Deva. She also collaborated on a song for the score of the award-winning film Kannathil Muthamittal.

She has also sung various songs in Kannada and Telugu. She has composed for more than 6 Tamil movies and has composed one song in a Malayalam movie Vasanthathinte Kanal Vazhikalil. She has composed jingles for various brands, like Madhurai Kumaran Silks, Suguna motors, Dazzler nail polish etc. She is the goodwill ambassador of a youth-based social organization called Raindropss.

== Filmography ==
=== As a singer ===
- "Madurai Jilla" – Shree
- "Vidaikodu Engal" – Kannathil Muthamittal
- "Malle Malle" – Chocolate
- "Aahaa Thamizhamma" – Kangalal Kaidhu Sei
- "Paarthale Paravasam" – Parthale Paravasam
- "Balleilakka" – Sivaji: The Boss
- "Blue Theme" - Blue
- "Keda Kari" – Raavanan
- "Naan Yen" – Coke Studio (Season 3) at MTV (2013)
- "Ennile Maha Olio" – Coke Studio (Season 3) at MTV (2013)
- "Karma Veeran" – "Kochadaiiyaan"
- "Putham Puthithaai" – "Kadaisi Pakkam (Upcoming Film)"
- "Saarattu Vandiyila" – Kaatru Veliyidai
- "Morethukuchindi" – Cheliyaa
- "Ponni Nadhi" – Ponniyin Selvan: I (Tamil)
- "Ponge Nadhi" – Ponniyin Selvan: I (Telugu)
- "Ther Thiruvizha" - Lal Salaam
- "Paar Paar Paar" - Magudam
- "Sye Sye Sye" - Makutam

=== As a composer ===
- Machi (2004)
- Aadatha Aattamellam (2009)
- Pesuvathu Kiliya (2009)
- Kadhalagi (2010)
- Ennai Etho Seithu Vittai (2011)
- Manchottile Veedu (2012)
- Vasanthathinte Kanal Vazhikalil (2014)
- Puriyadha Anandam Puthithaga Arambam (2015)
- Kadaisi Pakkam (2015)
- Yenda Thalaiyila Yenna Vekkala (2018)
- Miriam Maa (2023)

=== As a producer ===
- Yenda Thalaiyila Yenna Vekkala (2018)
