= My Sister =

My Sister may refer to:

- My Sister (2014 film), originally released as Sister, an American film
- My Sister (2021 film) or Sister, a Chinese film
- "My Sister" (Juliana Hatfield song), 1993
- "My Sister" (Reba McEntire song), 2005
- My Sister, a Taiwanese TV series
- "My Sister", a song by Tindersticks from Tindersticks, 1995
- Meri Bahen (also called My Sister), 1944 Hindi film
