= Pandiarajan =

Indian actor

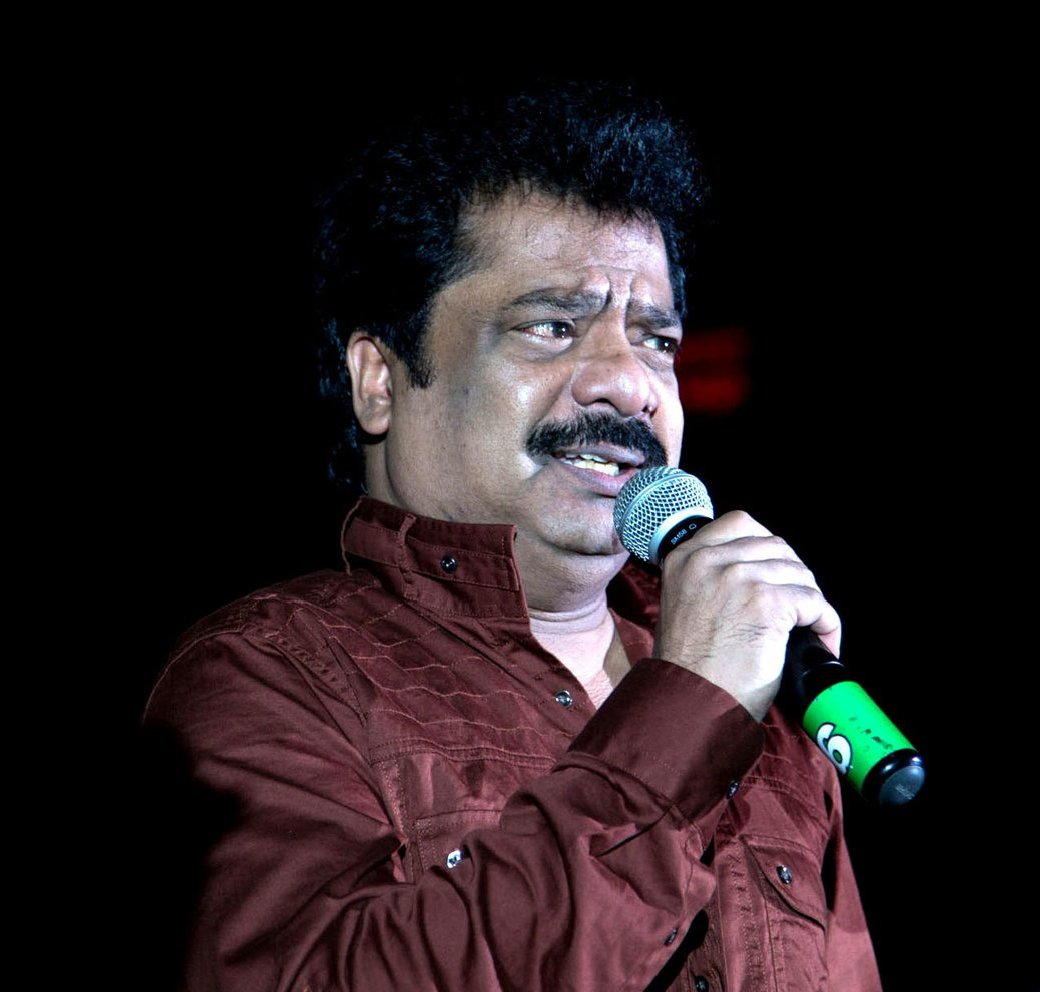
- Pandiarajan in 2015
- Born: Rathnam Pandiarajan; 2 October 1959 (age 66); Saidapet, Madras, Tamil Nadu, India
- Occupations: actor, director
- Years active: 1981–present
- Spouse: Vasuki (m. 1986)
- Children: 3, including Prithvi Rajan

Rathnam Pandiarajan is an Indian actor, director and comedian who has played leading roles in many humorous Tamil films and plays supporting and comedy roles.

== Personal life ==
Pandiarajan was born to Sulochana in Saidapet, Chennai in a lower-middle-class family. He has two sisters, Maheshwari and Geetha.

In 1986, he married Vasuki, daughter of the director, producer, and poet Avinasi Mani. They have three sons, Prithvi Rajan, Pallava Rajan and Prem Rajan.

== Career ==
During his early career, Pandiarajan aspired to become an actor but faced challenges due to his height and appearance. As a result, he decided to start his journey in the film industry as an assistant director. His interest in music led him to earn a diploma as “Isai Selvam” in 1977 from Thamizisai College. While working as an office assistant for writer Thooyavan, he crossed paths with director K. Bhagyaraj and eventually became his associate director. His journey led him in three of his film, Andha 7 Naatkal (1981), Thooral Ninnu Pochu (1982) and Darling, Darling, Darling (1982). His first venture as a director and lead actor Aan Paavam (1985) was a massive success at the box office.

He has co-starred with Sivaji Ganesan in Thaaiku Oru Thaalaattu (1986) and Muthukkal Moondru (1987). Actors Seetha, S. J. Suryah, Mayilsamy, Kollangudi Karuppayee and Bengali actress Debashree Roy were introduced by him to Tamil cinema and so was Srikanth Deva as music director.

Pandiarajan is also an accomplished director and has directed several hit films including Subramaniya Swamy (1994), Gopala Gopala (1996), Doubles (2000), and Kai Vandha Kalai (2006).

He played leading roles like Thaikulame Thaikulame (1995), Kaalam Maari Pochu (1996) and Purushan Pondatti (1996) were hits.

He acted in the TV serial Mama Maaple on Sun TV.

He directed his first short film, Magan in 2004. It was selected for screening at the International Children Film Festival held in Hyderabad. The film dealt with the issues of child labour. In 2006, he directed another short film, Iru Thuligal, on polio awareness. Two years later, in 2009, he made one more film on organ donation. Titled Azhagu, acclaimed cinematographer Ravi Varman produced the film and also cranked the camera. His short film in English, Help, was nominated at the ArtDeco Film Festival 2011, at São Paulo in Brazil.

== Filmography ==
=== Actor ===
Year	Film	Role	Notes
1981	Andha 7 Naatkal	Flower seller in the temple	Uncredited role
1982	Thooral Ninnu Pochu	Mridangam artist in "Yen Soga Kadhaiye"	Uncredited role
1982	Darling, Darling, Darling	New Watchman	Uncredited role
1985	Kanni Rasi	Person praying	Cameo appearance Also Director
1985	Aan Paavam	Chinna Paandi	Debut as actor Also director
1986	Thaaiku Oru Thaalaattu	Kannan	
1987	Manaivi Ready	Radha	Also Director
1987	Muthukkal Moondru	Pandian	
1987	Yettiki Potti	Balasubramaniam	
1987	Ullam Kavarntha Kalvan	Rajan	
1987	Vaazhga Valarga	Pandian	
1987	Meendum Mahaan	Pandian	
1987	Aayusu Nooru	Doctor Rathnam	
1988	Oorai Therinjikitten	Pandian / Rajan	
1988	Katha Nayagan	Mani	
1988	Paatti Sollai Thattathe	Selvam	
1988	Jadikketha Moodi	Viswanathan	
1989	Kakka Kadi		
1989	Thalaippu Seithigal	Chitti Babu / Sabapathy	
1989	Vaai Kozhuppu	Vasu	
1989	Ellame En Thangachi	Raja	
1989	Nethiyadi	Venu	Debut as music director
1989	Dilli Babu	Dilli Babu	
1989	Sariyana Jodi	Raja	
1989	Pudhu Mappillai	Pandian	Also writer
1989	Chinna Chinna Aasaigal	Vasu	
1990	Pachai Kodi	Balu	
1990	Manasukketha Maapillai		
1990	Pudhu Varisu	Pandian	
1992	Oor Panchayathu	Siva	
1992	Purushan Enakku Arasan	Seenu	
1993	Aadhityan	Chinna Paandi	
1993	Poranthalum Ambalaiya Porakka Koodathu	Lakshmi	
1994	Subramaniya Swamy	Velayudham	
1994	Killadi Mappillai	Rajaram	
1994	Pandianin Rajyathil	Pandian	
1995	Valli Vara Pora	Chinna Paandi	
1995	Padikkara Vayasula		
1995	Thaikulame Thaikulame	Pandian	
1995	Neela Kuyil	Muthusamy	
1996	Summa Irunga Machan	Subramani	
1996	Mappillai Manasu Poopola	Manikkam	
1996	Kaalam Maari Pochu	Muthupandi	
1996	Purushan Pondatti	Pandian	
1996	Gopala Gopala	Gopalakrishnan, Usha's grandfather	Dual roles
1997	Nalla Manusukkaran	Chinna Paandi	
1997	Adrasakkai Adrasakkai	Pandian	
1998	Kavalai Padathe Sagodhara	Janakiraman	
1998	Kumbakonam Gopalu	Gopal	
1999	Manaivikku Mariyadhai	Pandian	
1999	Sundari Neeyum Sundaran Naanum	Subramani	
1999	Suyamvaram	Pallavan	
2000	Doubles	Ganesh	
2000	Kannula Kaasa Kattappa	Kannan	
2001	Thaalikaatha Kaaliamman	Paandi	
2001	En Iniya Ponnilave	Shiva	
2001	Kabadi Kabadi	Pandian	
2001	Azhagana Naatkal	Michael	Guest appearance
2002	Andipatti Arasampatti	Andipatti	
2003	Ramachandra	Thirunavukkarasu	
2003	Vaseegara	Photographer	Guest appearance
2003	Anbu Thollai	Singamuthu	
2003	Military		Guest appearance
2003	Galatta Ganapathy	Ganapathy	
2003	Vadakku Vaasal	Ramakrishna	
2003	Adhaanda Idhaanda		
2004	Engal Anna	Cheenu	
2004	Jairam	Sachin Undulkar	
2004	Aarumugaswamy	Arumugam	
2004	Pethi Solla Thattathea	Sombu	
2004	Jollyman		
2004	Settai	Chinnasamy	
2004	Giri	Devaki's potential bridegroom	
2004	En Purushan Ethir Veetu Ponnu	Pandian	
2004	Kathavasheshan	Kathavarayan	Malayalam film
2004	Sollattuma	Paandi	
2005	London	Kathir	
2005	Maayavi	A film director	
2005	Vairavan	Ganesan	
2005	Thiru Thiru	Vathiyar	
2006	Iyappa Saamy	Pandian	
2006	Perarasu	Kandhasamy	
2006	Kaivantha Kalai	Ganesan	
2007	Kalakkura Chandru	Singampuli	
2008	Anjathe	Logu	
2008	Ponmagal Vandhaal		
2008	Pudhupaandi		
2008	Nayagan	Konjumani	
2009	Thoranai	Walter Vetrivel	
2010	Thairiyam	Dancer	Guest appearance
2010	Kola Kolaya Mundhirika	Madan	
2011	Kasethan Kadavulada	Duraisingam	
2011	Velayudham	Head Constable	
2012	Vinmeengal	Panchu	
2012	Gaantham	Rajesh	
2012	Mirattal	Babloo's father	
2012	Mannaru	Dancer	Special appearance
2012	Thiruthani	Mohanraj	
2013	Kurumbukara Pasanga	Sasi's father	
2013	Kolagalam	Venkatesh	
2014	Rettai Kadhir		
2014	Thirumanam Ennum Nikkah	Roshan Kumar	
2014	Vaayai Moodi Pesavum	Health Minister Sundaralingam	
2014	Pani Vizhum Nilavu	Ruthramoorthy	
2014	Aaivu Koodam	Martin Leo	
2015	Miss Pannidatheenga Appuram Varuthapaduveenga	Pavithra's father	
2015	Kadhal Agadhi	Meenakshi's husband	
2016	Mapla Singam	District Collector	
2016	Salaiyoram	J. G.	
2016	Ilamai Oonjal	Raja Paandi	
2016	Ner Mugam	Police officer	
2017	Mupparimanam	Himself	Cameo appearance
2017	Kavan	Pillai, Senior News Editor of Zen One TV	
2017	Aarambamae Attakasam	Jeeva's father	
2017	Tubelight	Mouli	
2017	Adhagappattathu Magajanangalay	Anand's father	
2017	Guru Uchaththula Irukkaru		
2018	Street Lights		
2018	Panjumittai	Psychiatrist	
2019	Natpe Thunai	Sridhar's father	
2019	Jaikka Povadhu Yaaru	M. P	
2019	Dhanusu Raasi Neyargale	Thirumandha	
2020	Taana	Shakthi's father	
2020	Naan Sirithal	Psychiatrist Veerabadhran	
2020	Ponmagal Vandhal	Karpooram	
2020	Kanni Raasi	Thiruvengadam	
2020	Kombu	Karthick's Uncle	
2021	Annaatthe	Idithangi	Extended Cameo appearance
2022	Riya - The Haunted House		
2022	Super Senior Heroes	Captain	Direct release on Sun TV
2023	Deiva Machan	Paramanandham	
2023	Partner	Scientist Prathap	
2023	Paatti Sollai Thattathe	Pandian	
2023	Sooragan	Chidambaram	
2024	Ippadiku Kadhal	Harish Nair	
2024	PT Sir	K. Selvaraj	
2026	Pookie	Kailash's father	

=== As director ===
==== Feature films ====
Year	Film	Notes
1985	Kanni Rasi	Debut film as director
1985	Aan Paavam	Debut film as actor
1987	Manaivi Ready	
1988	Nethiyadi	Also music composer
1994	Subramaniya Swamy	
1996	Gopala Gopala	
2000	Doubles	
2001	Kabadi Kabadi	
2006	Kaivantha Kalai	His son Prithvi Rajan's debut film as hero

==== Short films ====
Year	Film	Notes	Ref.
2004	Magan		
2006	Iru Thuligal		
2009	Azhagu		
2011	Help	English film	
2013	Man Paanai		

=== Television ===
Year	Title	Role	Channel
2010–2011	Mama Maaple	Rajapaandi	Sun TV
2015–2016	En Thangai	Pandian	Raj TV
2015	Koffee With DD	Guest	Vijay TV
2019–2020	Lolluppa	Host	Sun TV
2020–2021	Baakiyalakshmi	Sundaram	Star Vijay
2022	Maari	Rajan (Cameo Appearance)	Zee Tamil
2025	Veera	Judge (Cameo Appearance)	Zee Tamil
2025	Mounam Pesiyadhe	Locker Masilamani (Cameo Appearance)	Zee Tamil
