= En Thangai (TV series) =

- Also known as: My Sister
- என் தங்கை
- Genre: Soap opera
- Directed by: Mangai Arirajan
- Starring: Pandiarajan; Ramya; Anu Mohan; Lakshmi Raj
- Original language: Tamil
- No. of seasons: 1
- No. of episodes: 188

Production
- Camera setup: Multi-camera
- Running time: approx. 20-22 minutes per episode
- Production company: RR Telefilms

Original release
- Network: Raj TV
- Release: 4 May 2015 – 2 January 2016

En Thangai (transl. My Sister) is an Indian Tamil-language soap opera that aired Monday through Saturday on Raj TV from 4 May 2015 to 2 January 2016 at 6:30PM IST for 188 episodes. The show starred Pandiarajan, Ramya, Anu Mohan, Lakshmi Raj and among others. It was produced by produced by RR Telefilms and directed by Mangai Arirajan.

== Cast ==
- Pandiarajan
- Ramya
- Anu Mohan
- Lakshmi Raj
- Vasavi
- Madhuriya
- Vishwa
- Renukha
- Apsal
- Uma
- Makima
- Sathiyan
- Sumathi Sri
- Thanush
- Puspalatha
- Dhurai

== International broadcast ==
- In Sri Lanka Tamil Channel on Nethra TV.
- In Canada Tamil Channel on Tamil Entertainment Television.
