= Ganesha Meendum Santhipom =

2019 Indian film by Ratheesh Earate

- Directed by: Ratheesh Earate
- Written by: Ratheesh Earate
- Produced by: Arun Vikraman Krishnan
- Starring: Prithvi Rajan; Oviya
- Cinematography: Vibind V
- Edited by: P. Sai Suresh
- Music by: NLB Siby
- Production companies: HariGeetha Pictures, Skyway Pictures
- Release date: 5 April 2019
- Running time: 119 minutes
- Country: India
- Language: Tamil

Ganesha Meendum Santhipom is a 2019 Tamil comedy film directed by Ratheesh Earate. Produced by Arun Vikraman Krishnan, the film features Prithvi Rajan and Oviya in the lead roles while I. M. Vijayan, Singampuli, and Crane Manohar play supporting roles. The music was composed by NLB Siby, and the film released on 5 April 2019.

== Plot ==
The story revolves around a con artist named Solomon (Prithvi Rajan) who plays around with Keerthi (Oviya). She approaches Solomon, who pretends to be a local thug in Chennai, for avoiding her stalker. Solomon reaches Chennai after getting into trouble and being chased by the thug of Madurai, Katthari (I. M. Vijayan). The trouble starts when Solomon and his partner Famous Paandi (Singampuli) break Kattari's legacy motorcycle. The film evolves when Solomon is exposed in front of Keerthi and confronts Katthari's brother in Chennai.

== Cast ==
- Prithvi Rajan as Solomon
- Oviya as Keerthi
- Devika Nambiar
- I. M. Vijayan as Katthari
- Singampuli as Famous Paandi
- Crane Manohar as Auto Driver
- King Kong
- Lollu Sabha Manohar
- Theepetti Ganesan
- Ambani Shankar
- Bomb Ramesh
- Sakthi
- Guna Selvaraja
- Mippu
- Bava Lakshmanan
- Shiv Raj

== Production ==
The film's promotions cashed in on Oviya's popularity after she participated in Bigg Boss Tamil season 1.

== Soundtrack ==
The film is set with two songs, both composed by debutant music director Siby.

== Reception ==
Thinkal Menon of The Times of India opined that "The movie doesn't have anything which impresses the regular film buffs and starts testing one's patience after a few minutes into it". Gopinath Rajendran of Cinema Express wrote that "On the whole, the Prithvi Rajan-Oviyaa-starrer tries to do a lot but fails to be worth our time".
