= Mosadi =

2019 film by Jagadeesan

- Directed by: K. Jagatheesan
- Starring: Viju Ayyapasamy; Pallavi Dora NCB VIJAYAN
- Cinematography: R. Manikandan editing = S.M.V Subbu; Gopi Ra Nath
- Music by: Shajahan
- Production company: JCS Movies
- Release date: 21 June 2019
- Country: India
- Language: Tamil

Mosadi (transl. Fraud) is a 2019 Tamil language heist-thriller film directed by Jagadeesan. The film stars Viju Ayyapasamy and Pallavi Dora in the lead roles.

== Cast ==
Credited cast:

- Viju Ayyapasamy
- Pallavi Dora as Kuruvanji
- Vijayan as a minister

== Production ==
The film is directed by Jagadeesan, an assistant of K. Bhagyaraj. Tollywood actress Pallavi Dora was signed to make her Tamil debut. The title poster includes a handcuffed image to indicate that the film is a crime thriller. The film is about the conversion of black money following 2016 Indian banknote demonetisation.

== Release ==
The film was scheduled to release on 14 June. Thinkal Menon of The Times of India wrote that, "The movie has a not-so-bad plot, which reminds us of the interestingly-written heist film Sathuranga Vettai, which had solid performances and intriguing scenes. But Mosadi is nowhere close to it – it would have been a decent watch if the making and performance were at least average". Anupama Subramanian of the Deccan Chronicle stated that, " The director has given us an interesting plot, however, it is in the execution that he errs".
