= Prithvi Rajan =

Indian Tamil actor

- Born: 24 September 1989 (age 36); Chennai, Tamil Nadu, India
- Occupation: Actor
- Years active: 2006–present
- Relatives: Pandiarajan (father)

Prithvi Rajan is an Indian actor, who has appeared in Tamil films. His father is veteran actor Pandiarajan.

== Career ==
He made his debut in Kaivantha Kalai (2006) directed by his father Pandiarajan and the film opened to average reviews from critics. A critic noted Prithvi Rajan "makes his debut, does a convincing job and has his father's mannerisms." His next release, Naalaiya Pozhuthum Unnodu (2007), a romantic love story featuring Karthika Adaikalam had a much lower key release and failed at the box office. His next, Gemini Raghava's Vaidehi (2009), also featured the same actress.

During the making of Padhinettan Kudi Ellai Arambam, he was injured in a fire accident and suffered burn injuries. The film released in December 2011 with little publicity. He acted in lead role in Thodraa (2018), Kadhal Munnetra Kazhagam (2019), Ganesha Meendum Santhipom (2019) and Obama Ungalukkaaga (2021). Prithvi Pandiarajan has moved from one period setting to another in films such as Blue Star (2024), Parasakthi (2026) and Kara (2026).

== Personal life ==
Prithvi Rajan is the second son of actor-director Pandiarajan. His elder brother Pallavarajan had once announced a project starring Prithvi titled Eliyum Poonaiyum which never took off, while his younger brother Prem Rajan, is in the cast list of Prithvi's film Varatti.

He took part in the Celebrity Cricket League representing the Chennai Rhinos, winning acclaim for his performances in the field.

== Filmography ==
| Year | Film | Role | Notes |
|---|---|---|---|
| 2006 | Kaivantha Kalai | Kannan | |
| 2007 | Naalaiya Pozhuthum Unnodu | Sakthi | |
| 2009 | Vaidehi | Venkat | |
| 2011 | Padhinettan Kudi Ellai Arambam | Viruman | |
| 2012 | Paettai | | |
| 2016 | Vaaimai | Velan | |
| 2017 | Mupparimanam | Himself | Cameo appearance |
| 2018 | Thodraa | Shankar | |
| 2019 | Sagaa | Ganga | |
| 2019 | Kadhal Munnetra Kazhagam | Sethu | |
| 2019 | Ganesha Meendum Santhipom | Solomon | |
| 2021 | Kasada Thapara | | |
| 2021 | Laabam | Selvaraj | |
| 2021 | Obama Ungalukkaaga | Alexander | |
| 2022 | DSP | Selvam | |
| 2024 | Blue Star | Sam | |
| 2026 | Parasakthi | Vaigarai | |
| 2026 | Kara | Murugesan | |
