= Kaadhali =

Kaadhali (lit. 'Girlfriend') may refer to these Indian films:

- Kaadhali (1997 film), a Tamil-language film by Siddhu
- Kaadhali (2017 film), a Telugu-language film by Pattabhi R. Chilukuri
