= Parchhaiyan (film) =

- Directed by: Sharankumar Chand
- Starring: Vinod Khanna; Reshma
- Release date: 1972
- Country: India
- Language: Hindi

Parchhaiyan is a 1972 Bollywood drama film directed by Sharankumar Chand. The film stars Vinod Khanna and Reshma.

== Cast ==
- Vinod Khanna as Dilip Khanna / Rakesh
- Reshma as Sudha
- Bindu as Rangee
- Sujit Kumar as Mohan
- Ranjeet as Ranjeet
- Mohan Choti as Ramesh
- Iftekhar as Choudhary Shyamlal
- Indrani Mukherjee as Seeta
- Murad as Judge Khanna
- Sajjan as Sandeep Narayan Verma
- Meena T. as Rekha

== Soundtrack ==
All Songs Composed by R D Burman and Lyrics by Majrooh Sultanpuri

#	Song	Singer
1	"Khuli Khuli Zulfen, Khoye Khoye Nain"	Kishore Kumar
2	"Hanske Pukarke"	Kishore Kumar, Lata Mangeshkar
3	"Zara Ankhiyan La Laiye"	Mohammed Rafi
4	"Saanson Mein Kabhi, Dil Mein Kabhi"	Mohammed Rafi, Asha Bhosle
5	"O Garam Garam Kaaya"	Asha Bhosle
