= Kovai Brothers =

- DVD cover
- Directed by: Sakthi Chidambaram
- Written by: Sakthi Chidambaram
- Produced by: Sakthi Chidambaram
- Starring: Sathyaraj; Sibiraj; Vadivelu; Namitha; Uma; Kovai Sarala
- Cinematography: Suresh Devan
- Music by: D. Imman
- Production company: Cinema Paradise
- Release date: 24 February 2006
- Country: India
- Language: Tamil

Kovai Brothers is a 2006 Tamil-language comedy spoof film written, produced, and directed by Sakthi Chidambaram. The film stars Sathyaraj and his son Sibiraj, alongside Vadivelu, Namitha, Uma and Kovai Sarala. The music was composed by D. Imman. The film was dubbed in Telugu as Pokiri Brothers.

== Plot ==
Kovai Brothers tells of Ganesh and Vasanth, friends who come to Chennai from their village in Coimbatore to take revenge on the killers of Ganesh's niece. The duo stays with Ekadasi and then works in a TV channel that exposes corruption in the society. Sanya also works as an anchor in the same channel. Ganesh and Vasanth both see Sanaya and fall for her. Ganesh and Vasanth take on the bad guys and corruption besides falling for the same girl. The rest of the film is on how they kill the rowdies and who wins Sanya's love.

== Cast ==
- Sathyaraj as Ganeshan
- Sibiraj as Vasanth
- Arun Pandian as Dr. M. Gnanasekharan
- Uma as Rajeshwari, Ganeshan's Niece and Vasanth's Lover
- Namitha as Sania
- Vadivelu as Ekadasi
- Kovai Sarala as Tenthara (Spoof of Nayanthara), Foursha (Spoof of Trisha) and Bisin (Spoof of Asin)
- Mohan Natarajan as Collector Arivukarasan
- Shobha as Leelavathi, Ekadasi's wife
- T. P. Gajendran as Dr.Lingesan
- Thambi Ramaiah as Astrologer Kadambavel
- Vennira Aadai Moorthy as Major Varadharajan, Ekadasi's Father-in-law
- Delhi Ganesh as Kesavan
- Sriman as Kathamuthu
- Singamuthu
- Halwa Vasu
- Bava Lakshmanan
- D. Imman (cameo appearance in song "Ulagathula")

== Production ==
The film was launched on 12 October 2005 at AVM Studios. The film saw Namitha pairing up with Sibiraj for first time. The film was shot at locations in Chennai, Ambasamudram, Kuttralam, Mercara, Sundarapandipuram and Achankovil in a 50 days' schedule.

== Soundtrack ==
Kovai Brothers

Soundtrack album by D. Imman
- Released: 2006
- Genre: Feature film soundtrack
- Language: Tamil

D. Imman chronology
Madrasi (2006)	Kovai Brothers (2006)	Thalai Nagaram (2006)

All lyrics are written by Na. Muthukumar; all music is composed by D. Imman

Track listing
No.	Title	Singer(s)	Length
1.	"Adada"	Kalyani
2.	"Gopamavane"	Naveen, Manikka Vinayagam
3.	"Neeyum Naanum"	Karthik
4.	"Sootta Kilapi"	T. L. Maharajan, Srilekha Parthasarathy
5.	"Theme"	Karthik, Timmy, D. Imman, Ganapathy
6.	"Ulagathula"	D. Imman

== Critical reception ==
Sify wrote: "The film lacks logic or sense and rests purely on Satyaraj’s ‘lollu’ dialogues and his takes on Suriya’s Ghajini, S. J. Surya’s New, Simbu’s Manmathan and also pokes fun at stars joining politics". Chennai Online wrote "The director, who’s teaming up with Satyaraj had resulted in some enjoyable entertainers earlier, fails this time to balance the act between the two heroes. And so while there are all the ingredients that are supposed to spell entertainment, comedy, action, suspense and Namita, it just fails to generate any interest".
