= Chellakannu =

- Directed by: N. Rathnam
- Screenplay by: N. Rathnam
- Story by: Jayram
- Produced by: R. V. Mahalingam; Vijaya Panneer Selvam
- Starring: Vignesh; Yuvarani
- Cinematography: M. Chandramouli
- Edited by: Rajan – Kittan
- Music by: Deva
- Production company: Poornima Shankar Enterprises
- Release date: 12 May 1995
- Running time: 140 minutes
- Country: India
- Language: Tamil

Chellakannu is a 1995 Indian Tamil-language romantic drama film directed by N. Rathnam. The film stars Vignesh and Yuvarani. It was released on 12 May 1995, and ran for over 100 days in theatres.

== Plot ==
Chellakannu and Chandra are cousins, and they have loved each other since their childhood. Chandra then leaves the village for studying in the city and Chellakannu cannot forget her. When she is back, their family decide to marry them.

Dhandapani, Chellakannu's father, is the village Panchayat headman. One day, he punishes Rajavel for his bad behaviour towards a woman. Rajavel and his father Kailasam decide to take revenge and to create a conflict between Dhandapani and Thangavel, Chandra's father. At the village Panchayat, Thangavel is punished by Dhandapani for a crime he did not commit, thus Kailasam and Rajavel succeed in their plan.

A humiliated Thangavel cancels his daughter's marriage. He then becomes friends with Kailasam and Thangavel contests the Panchayat headman's election but Dhandapani wins the election. Thangavel, who was upset with the election result, arranges his daughter Chandra's marriage with Rajavel.

Later, Thangavel realizes that Rajavel is a womaniser and cancels the marriage with Dhandapani's help. The rest of the story is what happens to Chellakannu and Chandra.

== Cast ==
- Vignesh as Chellakannu
- Yuvarani as Chandra
- Radha Ravi as Dhandapani, Chellakannu's father
- Livingston as Thangavel, Chandra's father
- R. Sundarrajan as Nagarajan
- Manorama as Kaliyamurthy
- Vadivelu
- Vijay Krishnaraj as Kailasam
- Babloo Prithviraj as Rajavel
- Meesai Murugesan
- Kavitha as Kamalamba, Chellakannu's mother
- Vaiyapuri as Barber
- Shankar as Chellakannu (child)
- Monica as Chandra (child)

== Soundtrack ==
The soundtrack was composed by Deva, with lyrics written by Pulamaipithan.

Song	Singer(s)	Duration
"Bookampama"	S. P. Balasubrahmanyam	4:41
"Chinna Kuruvi Rendu"	S. P. Balasubrahmanyam, K. S. Chithra	4:55
"Chinna Kuruvi Rendu"	Kalyan, Sangeetha Sajith	5:02
"Kallu Kuriya"	Deva, Manorama	3:17
"Rakku Muthu"	Malaysia Vasudevan, Swarnalatha	4:14
"Sikki Gichchi"	S. P. Balasubrahmanyam, Kalyan	4:48
"Vandiyile"	S. P. Balasubrahmanyam, Swarnalatha	5:00
