= Maanaseega Kadhal =

- Directed by: P. S. Raman
- Written by: P. S. Raman
- Produced by: P. S. Raman
- Starring: Hamsavardhan; Sushva
- Cinematography: Suriyan
- Edited by: M. V. Prem—Harish N. P.
- Music by: Deva
- Production company: Saibaba Creations
- Release date: 27 November 1999
- Country: India
- Language: Tamil

Maanaseega Kadhal is a 1999 Indian Tamil-language romance film, written, directed and produced by actor Ravichandran, under his real name P. S. Raman. The film stars Hamsavardhan and Sushva, while Ravichandran himself and Vaiyapuri portray supporting roles. The music for the film was composed by Deva and the film was released on 27 November 1999.

== Cast ==
- Hamsavardhan as Hamsavardhan and Madhan
- Sushva as Hamsavardhini
- Nizhalgal Ravi
- Rocky
- Madhan Bob
- Vaiyapuri
- Master Mahendran
- Ravichandran
- Kottai Perumal
- Manoj
- K. Natraj

== Production ==
The film marked the acting debut of Hamsavardhan, son of veteran Tamil actor Ravichandran. Ravichandran also made his directorial debut with this film under his real name P. S. Raman.

== Soundtrack ==
The music was composed by Deva.

Song	Singers	Lyrics	Length
"Anandha Katre"	P. Unnikrishnan	Na. Muthukumar	05:02
"Kadala Kadala"	Krishnaraj	Kalidasan	05:09
"Kandha Kadamba"	Harish Raghavendra, Krishnaraj, Master Rohith	Na. Muthukumar	05:09
"Kooduvancheriyile"	Krishnaraj, Sushmitha	Chidambaranathan	05:05
"Signal Kidaikatha"	Unni Menon, Anuradha Sriram	Bhavanidasan	03:54

== Reception ==
A reviewer from Chennai Online wrote, "Not much was expected of the film, with great publicity surrounding it, but surprisingly it has turned out to be a fairly engaging entertainer". The critic added "the takings are slightly old fashioned, but there are some twists and turns in the script" and "the second half could have been better worked out".
