= Amma Appa Chellam =

2004 film directed by Suryan

- Directed by: Suryan
- Written by: Vivekhananth (dialogues)
- Screenplay by: Suryan
- Story by: Vivekhananth
- Produced by: L. Vijay Subbiah; M. Saravanan; M. Kumaran
- Starring: Bala; Chaya Singh; Sathya
- Cinematography: K. V. Mani
- Edited by: P. Sureshrajhan
- Music by: Bharadwaj
- Production company: Ramadevi Cine Enterprises
- Release date: 3 December 2004
- Running time: 135 minutes
- Country: India
- Language: Tamil

Amma Appa Chellam (transl. Father, Mother, Chellam) is a 2004 Indian Tamil language romantic drama film directed by Suryan. The film stars Bala, Chaya Singh, and Sathya, while Periyar Dasan, Sabitha Anand, Nizhalgal Ravi, Anjali Devi, T. P. Gajendran, Mayilsamy, Thyagu, and Vijay Krishnaraj playing supporting roles. It was released on 3 December 2004.

== Plot ==
Chellam, who comes from a poor family, passes his plus two examination with distinction and gets the first rank in the district, making his parents Kannaiah and Velamma proud. The studious Chellam then joins a college in Chennai. His college mate Nanditha, who is from a wealthy family, befriends him and slowly falls in love with him. Chellam loves her too, but he refrains from revealing his feelings because improving his parents' life is his first priority in life. After finishing his studies, the skilled Chellam struggles to find a good job, and Nanditha wants him to show her his true feelings. However, Chellam makes it clear that his parents are much more important than anything else, thus breaking Nanditha's heart.

Chellam then decides to start a dairy farm, but he needs a bank loan to start his project. His cousin Kumar, who worked in Malaysia for many years, helps him get a bank loan. Chellam works hard and improves the living condition of his parents as he wished. When Chellam finally decides to reveal his love to Nanditha, she gets engaged to Kumar. Chellam, who is caught in a difficult situation, can neither reveal his love nor stop the wedding because of the respect he has for his cousin. On the eve of her wedding, Nanditha secretly meets Chellam and begs him to marry her, but he refuses. The day of the wedding, the heartbroken Nanditha tries to kill herself by jumping into a well, but Chellam saves her from drowning. Kumar learns about their love and supports it. The film ends with Chellam and Nanditha getting married.

== Cast ==
- Bala as Chellam
- Chaya Singh as Nanditha
- Sathya as Kumar
- Periyar Dasan as Kannaiah, Chellam's father
- Sabitha Anand as Velamma, Chellam's mother
- Nizhalgal Ravi as Nanditha's father
- Anjali Devi as Pushpa, Nanditha's mother
- T. P. Gajendran as Kumar's father
- Mayilsamy as Vinayagar
- Thyagu as Pannaiyar
- Vijay Krishnaraj as Govindaraj
- Tharika as Divya
- Megha as Akila
- T. S. Muthu

== Production ==
The film marked the directorial debut of Suryan who earlier assisted J. D.-Jery and Arun Pandian.

== Soundtrack ==
Amma Appa Chellam

Soundtrack album by Bharadwaj
- Released: 2004
- Recorded: 2004
- Genre: Feature film soundtrack
- Length: 23:53
- Label: Sony Music India
- Producer: Bharadwaj

Bharadwaj chronology
Dreams (2004)	Amma Appa Chellam (2004)	Jananam (2004)

The film score and the soundtrack were composed by Bharadwaj. The soundtrack, released in 2004, features 5 tracks written by Arivumathi, Snehan and Vivekhananth.

Tracklist
No.	Title	Lyrics	Singer(s)	Length
1.	"Aariraro"	Vivekhananth	K. S. Chithra	4:56
2.	"Neeyum Naanum"	Snehan	Srinivas, Reshmi	4:51
3.	"Mudhal Mudhalai"	Snehan	Sathyan, Mahalakshmi	5:03
4.	"Pattam Poochi"	Arivumathi	Mahalakshmi	4:50
5.	"Poraadinaal"	Vivekhananth	Krishnaraj	4:13
Total length:				23:53

== Release ==
Cinesouth lauded the cinematography: "Each and every frame is noteworthy. The way to all the location have been filmed is simply superb" but criticized the film's screenplay and music.
