= Ulta Palta (1998 film) =

- Title card
- Directed by: Relangi Narasimha Rao
- Written by: Omkaar
- Screenplay by: Relangi Narasimha Rao; Shankar; Omkaar
- Story by: N. S. Shankar
- Based on: Ulta Palta (1997)
- Produced by: P. Balaram
- Starring: Rajendra Prasad; Srikanya; Reshma; Raksha
- Cinematography: M. Nagendra Kumar
- Edited by: Murali-Ramayya
- Music by: M. M. Srilekha
- Production company: Sri Anupama Productions
- Release date: 1998
- Running time: 123 mins
- Country: India
- Language: Telugu

Ulta Palta (transl. Straight and Reverse) is a 1998 Indian Telugu-language comedy film produced by P. Balaram under the Sri Anupama Productions banner and directed by Relangi Narasimha Rao. It stars Rajendra Prasad, Srikanya, Reshma, Raksha and music composed by M. M. Srilekha. The film is a remake of the Kannada film of the same name (1997), which itself is a remake of the 1963 Bengali film Bhranti Bilas (1963). Unlike the Kannada original, the Telugu version failed at box-office.

== Cast ==
- Rajendra Prasad as Raja & Raja (Dual Role)
- Srikanya as Radha
- Reshma as Swathi
- Raksha as Mohini
- Ali as Kumar
- Babu Mohan as Ramu & Ramu (Dual Role)
- Tanikella Bharani as Raja's friend
- Mallikarjuna Rao as S.I.
- A.V.S. as Marvadi Seth
- M. S. Narayana as Vice President Narayana
- K. K. Sarma as Venkatrao
- Chitti Babu as Party President's PA
- Ashok Kumar as Raja's secretary
- Jayalalita as Baby
- Krishnaveni as Ramulamma
- Kalpana Rai as Dr. Kanya Kumari
- Y. Vijaya as Party President Bala Tripura Sundari

== Soundtrack ==
Ulta Palta

Film score by M. M. Srilekha
- Released: 1998
- Genre: Soundtrack
- Length: 21:48
- Label: Supreme Music
- Producer: M. M. Srilekha

M. M. Srilekha chronology
Sivaiah (1998)	Ulta Palta (1998)	Preyasi Rave (1999)

Music composed by M. M. Srilekha. Music released on Supreme Music Company.

No.	Title	Lyrics	Singer(s)	Length
1.	"Chamaku Chamaka"	Bhuvana Chandra	Mano, Chitra	4:37
2.	"Kashmirunundi Kanyakumari"	Ramakrishna	Mano, S. P. Sailaja	4:31
3.	"Rajamendri Ramba"	Vennelakanti	Mano, M. M. Srilekha	4:19
4.	"Painavundi Moonu"	Bhuvana Chandra	Pranai, M. M. Srilekha, Swetha Naga	4:26
5.	"Mushtikala"	Polishetty	Pranai, S. P. Sailaja	3:55
Total length:				21:48

== See also ==
- The Comedy of Errors § Adaptations
