= Vadagupatti Maapillai =

2001 film

- Directed by: V. C. Guhanathan
- Written by: V. C. Guhanathan; Jaya Guhanathan; Prasanna Kumar
- Produced by: V. C. Guhanathan
- Starring: Hamsavardhan; Reshma; Anusha; Vivek; Vadivelu
- Cinematography: Madhavan
- Edited by: Babu
- Music by: Sirpy
- Production company: Prathap Art Creations
- Release date: 21 December 2001
- Country: India
- Language: Tamil

Vadagupatti Maapillai (transl. Son-in-law from Vadugapatti) is a 2001 Tamil-language romantic comedy film produced, co-written and directed by V. C. Guhanathan. The film stars Hamsavardhan and Reshma, while Vivek and Vadivelu appear in supporting roles. Featuring music composed by Sirpy, the film was released on 21 December 2001.

== Plot ==
When Vadivu's city-based fiancé, Vijay, refuses to marry her for her simple looks, her father swears that he'll get them married anyhow. She then changes into the avatar of Jeena and enters Vijay's life.

== Cast ==
- Hamsavardhan as Vijay
- Reshma as Vadivu (Jeena)
- Anusha as Deepa
- Vivek as Rowther
- Vadivelu as Veerapandi
- Senthil
- Visu as Gomathi Shankar
- Kovai Sarala as Anjala
- Pandu as Dhadaji
- Sumithra
- Vaiyapuri
- Seethalakshmi
- Anuja

== Production ==
The film was earlier titled as Anandham Anandham and production had started in mid-1998. The film's lead pair Hamsavardhan and Reshma fell in love and married in real life.

== Soundtrack ==
Soundtrack was composed by Sirpy, while lyrics were written by Palani Bharathi.

- "Yaru Intha Figure"
- "Alwaa Kodukuran"
- "Adi Maampazham Neraththazhaki"
- "Sollamal Kaathal Azhaikirathe"
