= Maravathe Kanmaniye =

- Title card
- Directed by: N. S. Maadhavan
- Written by: N. S. Maadhavan
- Produced by: Malaysia T. Maharathan
- Starring: Vineeth; Karan; Ravali; Reshma
- Cinematography: Sekhar; V. Joseph
- Edited by: V. Udhayasankaran
- Music by: Mahakumar
- Production company: Maha Creations
- Release date: 7 October 1999
- Running time: 139 minutes
- Country: India
- Language: Tamil

Maravathe Kanmaniye (transl. Don't forget, apple of my eye) is a 1999 Indian Tamil-language romantic drama film directed by N. S. Madhavan in his debut. The film stars Vineeth and Ravali, with Karan, Reshma, Sivakumar and Senthil playing supporting roles. It was released on 7 October 1999.

== Cast ==
- Vineeth as Surya
- Karan as Marudhu
- Ravali as Kanmani
- Reshma
- Sivakumar as Dharmaraasu
- Vennira Aadai Moorthy
- Senthil
- Kazan Khan
- Madhan Bob
- C. R. Saraswathi
- Chinni Jayanth
- Karikalan
- Kanagaraj
- Balaji
- Imayavan
- Theni Thenali

== Production ==
When the film was launched in late 1997, Suriya was expected to star in the lead role and work alongside his father Sivakumar for the first time. However, he was later replaced by Vineeth. Ravali dieted and got into shape for her role in the film. Maravathe Kanmaniye is the debut of director N. S. Madhavan, producer Malaysia T. Maharathan and composer Mahakumar. Maharathan, a businessman from Malaysia who made a visit to Chennai met Mahakumar who was scouting for chances in films, he decided to produce the film after he was impressed by his tunes.

== Soundtrack ==
The soundtrack was composed by Mahakumar.

Song	Singer(s)	Duration
"Koo Koo Kuyilamma"	Sujatha Mohan	5:20
"Vaanirukku"	Hariharan	4:08
"Ellora Oviyam"	Sujatha Mohan, P. Unnikrishnan, Anuradha Sriram	4:43
"Maravathey"	S. P. Balasubrahmanyam, Sunanda, T. L. Maharajan	4:44
