= Eesa =

- Directed by: Bala Ganesha
- Written by: Bala Ganesha
- Produced by: J. Jayakrishnan
- Starring: Vignesh; Lakshana
- Cinematography: R. B. Balaganesh
- Edited by: B. S. Vasu
- Music by: Haran
- Production company: JK Creations
- Release date: 7 August 2009
- Running time: 120 minutes
- Country: India
- Language: Tamil

Eesa is a 2009 Indian Tamil language action drama film directed by Bala Ganesha. The film stars Vignesh and Lakshana, with Thoothukudi M. Rajendran, Singampuli, M. S. Bhaskar and Lollu Sabha Manohar playing supporting roles. The film, produced by J. Jayakrishnan, was released on 7 August 2009.

== Plot ==
The film begins with the young man Sudaleeswaran aka Eesa (Vignesh) killing a salt pan owner in a remote village in Thoothukudi. Eesa lives in a small hut with his wife Selvi (Lakshana). He then continues to kill a couple of salt pan owners and bumps them off in his hut.

Thanga Malai Annachi (Thoothukudi M. Rajendran) is the local bigwig and the owner of a salt pan in which Eesa works. Upset to see his partners and friends killed by a mysterious person, Thanga Malai Annachi starts to kill all his enemies. He then finds out that the killer is none other than Eesa, so he sends the police to catch him. The police discovers multiple corpses in Eesa's hut, including Selvi's. It is revealed that Eesa lives in a world of his own and believes that Selvi, who was killed a few months back, is still alive. He keeps her body in his hut and kills the murderers.

A few months back, Eesa, who spent most of the time with his friend Kadukkai (Singampuli), fell in love with Selvi. Selvi accepted his love, and they got married. She later became pregnant. One day, Selvi saw Thanga Malai Annachi and his gang brutally murdering a government official and his wife. Selvi questioned them, resulting in her brutal murder. Eesa, who was working in the salt pan, heard a cry of pain and discovered his wife in blood. Eesa tried to save her, but she died in his arms.

The rest of the story is how Eesa killed Thanga Malai Annachi.

== Cast ==
- Vignesh as Sudaleeswaran aka Eesa
- Lakshana as Selvi
- Thoothukudi M. Rajendran as Thanga Malai Annachi
- Singampuli as Kadukkai
- M. S. Bhaskar as Duraisamy
- Lollu Sabha Manohar as Karuthapandi
- Madurai Saroja as Selvi's aunt
- V. B. D. Prasad as Annachi
- P. Arun as Annachi
- E. K. Venkatesh as Annachi
- Muthukaalai
- Rajini Nivetha
- Subburaj
- Asha
- Nikisha
- Ramdoss as Fisherman (uncredited)

== Production ==
The stunt scenes have been handled by stunt master Dragon Chingli. Eesa has been shot extensively in Courtallam, Vasudevanallur and Aranthangi.

== Soundtrack ==
Eesa

Soundtrack album by Haran
- Released: 2009
- Recorded: 2009
- Genre: Feature film soundtrack
- Length: 24:31
- Producer: Haran

The film score and the soundtrack were composed by Haran. The soundtrack, released in 2009, features 5 tracks with lyrics written by Na. Muthukumar, Yugabharathi and Madurakavi. The audio was launched at Kamaraj Hall, alongside special guests A. R. Rahman, Thangar Bachan, Jiiva and Karan. Superstar Rajinikanth sent a letter wishing the team well, which was read out by Haran's father Sridhar.

Track	Song	Singer(s)	Duration
1	"Aagayam Idi Muzhanga"	Mukesh Mohamed, Periya Karuppu Thevar	6:26
2	"Oru Murai Nee Paarthal"	Harish Raghavendra, Bombay Jayashri	4:29
3	"Unnalathan Nanum Vazhven"	Naresh Iyer	5:04
4	"Vettaruva Kannazhagi"	Udit Narayan, Haran	5:00
5	"Yaaradi Nee Mohini"	Kennedy, Haran	6:07

== Reception ==
=== Box office ===
The film opened in a few centres across Chennai, Tamil Nadu to an average opening.

=== Critical reception ===
The film opened to mixed to negative reviews from critics with Lakshana's performance receiving unanimous praise from film critics.

Sify labelled the film as average and went on to praise "the locations and the climax action scenes". Deccan Herald wrote, "despite creditable performances, Eesa leaves you with a rather unpleasant feeling".
