= Thendral (film) =

- Poster
- Directed by: Thankar Bachan
- Written by: Thankar Bachan
- Produced by: V. Ravichandran
- Starring: Parthiban; Uma
- Cinematography: Thangar Bachan
- Edited by: S. Satish; B. N. Harsha
- Music by: Vidyasagar
- Production company: Aascar Films
- Release date: 5 February 2004
- Running time: 162 minutes
- Country: India
- Language: Tamil

Thendral (transl. Breeze) is a 2004 Indian Tamil-language drama film written and directed by Thankar Bachan and produced by V. Ravichandran. The film stars Parthiban and Uma, with Rajashree in a pivotal role. It was released on 5 February 2004.

== Plot ==
In 1989, Nalankilli is a famous writer from Aynavaram, Chennai who is passionate about social justice; he refuses to accept the Sahitya Akademi Award and instead asks the president to provide justice to Tamil Nadu in the Kaveri River water dispute. Thamarai and her mother live in a hut in Aynavaram and sell milk to earn a living. Thamarai is a fan of Nalankilli and has a secret crush on him.

One day, Nalankilli interferes with the kumbabishekam ritual at the local temple and is arrested. In prison, he meets a man who is on death row, having been charged with a crime he did not commit. The man tells Nalankilli that he and his father used to be parai artists, but that father lost his hand in an altercation with a bigot.

Meanwhile, Thamarai's mother dies in a fire and she is adopted by relatives who want her to marry their son. She escapes to Tiruchirapalli and meets Nalankilli, who mistakes her for a prostitute. Nalankilli has sex with Thamarai and pays her.

Thamarai moves to Palani and gives birth to a boy, whom she names Valavan. Valavan occasionally asks who his father is, but Thamarai does not tell him. One day, Valavan runs away from home after being teased about his lack of a father. He meets Nalankilli, who invites Valavan to live with him, and the two become friends.

When Nalankilli brings prostitutes to the house, Valavan becomes upset and they fight. Valavan runs away and Nalankilli finds him. Nalankilli and Valavan go to Pazhanii to meet Thamarai, but she has gone to Chennai to search for Valavan. Nalankilli reads Thamarai's diary and discovers that Thamarai is in love with him, and that he is Valavan's biological father.

Meanwhile, Thamarai falls into the sewer and is brought to a hospital. Before she dies, she tells Valavan that Nalankilli is his father. Nalankilli decides to devote the rest of his life to his son.

== Cast ==
- Parthiban as A. P. Nalankilli
- Uma as Thamaraichelvi
- Ranjini Pradeep as Thamaraichelvi (younger)
- Swathi as Sundari
- Aravind Bachan as Killi Vallavan
- Ravichandran as Singara Velu Nayagar
- Ramesh Khanna as Sundarakanth
- Raghava Lawrence as Kumar
- Madhan Bob as Venkatrama Iyer
- Periyar Dasan as Dr. Manisamy
- Ceylon Manohar as Subbu's father
- K. R. Vatsala as Subbu's mother
- Rohit as Subbu
- Chitti Babu as PT Master
- Kaka Gopal as Uthirapathi

== Production ==
Thangar Bachan initially approached Karthik to play the lead role, but the actor declined and Parthiban was instead cast. Most of the film was shot at Palani. A song featuring Uma was shot at Palani, Godavari, Rajamundhry and the beach at Visakhapatnam.

== Soundtrack ==
The music was composed by Vidyasagar.

| Song | Singers | Lyrics |
|---|---|---|
| "Adi Thozhi" | Kalyani Nair | Thamarai |
| "Aazhakkadalu" | Madhu Balakrishnan | Palani Bharathi |
| "Pachai Kili" | Karthik, Harini | Na. Muthukumar |
| "Pathrakotta Mama" | Malathy, Manikka Vinayagam, Vidya, Karthik | Arivumathi |
| "Putham Puthu Paattu" | Pushpavanam Kuppusamy, S. P. Balasubrahmanyam | vairamuthu |
| "Vaanavillin Vannam" | Sadhana Sargam | Yugabharathi |
| "Yei Penne" | Shreya Ghoshal | Thamarai |

== Reception ==
Daily News wrote, "the movie moves on without the usual cinematic trends at the start but to make the movie interesting, in the end, the director makes use of those trends. Yet, Thendral has jointly touched the audience with its absorbing story." Sify lauded the cast performances but felt "the director has given undue importance to the character of Valavan who becomes irritating towards the end". The reviewer also criticised the music but praised the cinematography. Cinesouth wrote "Almost all the films in Tamil are made with the hero in mind. In such a scenario, Thangar Bachchan deserves an applause for making a film from the woman's point of view. But, does that need so many tears and weeping sessions? Is it right to depress the audience too?". Despite critical acclaim, the film's collections were low on during the first day of the release.
