= Vikadan =

- Film poster
- Directed by: Arun Pandian
- Written by: Arun Pandian
- Produced by: Mangant Vijaya Babu
- Starring: Harish Raghavendra; Gayathri Raguram; Arun Pandian; Radhika Chaudhari; Uma
- Cinematography: Velu Prabhakaran
- Music by: Jerome Pushparaj
- Production company: Friends Creation
- Release date: 1 August 2003
- Country: India
- Language: Tamil

Vikadan is a 2003 Indian Tamil-language romantic thriller film written and directed by Arun Pandian. The film stars playback singer Harish Raghavendra in lead role for first time, alongside Arun Pandian, Gayathri Raguram, Radhika Chaudhari and Uma.

== Plot ==
Rammohan, after five long years of saying 'no' to getting married, agrees to wed Gowri after seeing her picture. But he gets a shock on his wedding night when Gowri turns out to be the exact opposite of what he had imagined her to be. While he had thought she would be a traditional, homely girl, Gowri turns out to be an ultra-modern girl who even drinks. On the other hand, Kaveri (Uma), who Rammohan hires as his secretary at work, is the kind of woman he wished for as his wife. Meanwhile, Rammohan rubs Selvakumar, the new policeman in town, the wrong way and Selvakumar itches for a chance to get back at him. The time comes when Rammohan accidentally kills Gowri during an argument. He decides to cover up Gowri's death by performing plastic surgery on Kaveri to resemble Gowri. His actions causes suspicions in Selvakumar, who decides to unravel the mystery and hunt Ram down. How Ram success in escaping Selvakumar's attention forms the rest of the story.

== Cast ==
- Harish Raghavendra as Rammohan
- Arun Pandian as Inspector Selvakumar
- Gayathri Raguram as Gowri
- Radhika Chaudhari as Bhanu Selvakumar
- Uma as Kaveri
- Nassar
- Rekha as Rammohan's mother
- Vijayan
- Venkat Prabhu as Rammohan's friend

== Soundtrack ==
Music was composed by newcomer Jerome Pushparaj. He previously assisted Vijay Anand.

- "Kumukku" – Mano
- "Yaarivalo" – Harish Raghavendra
- "Rama Rama" – Anuradha Sriram
- "Oomai paadum" – Harish Raghavendra
- "Neeya" – Pushpa Sriram

== Reception ==
Sify wrote "Despite minor shortcomings the film moves at a brisk pace and the incidents are well depicted. Harish has handled the role of Ram, which had shades of grey quite well. Gayathri Raghuram is ok and Arun Pandian has a tailor made role for him. The music by debutant Jerome Pushparaj is average. On the whole Vikatan is an unusual thriller". Visual Dasan of Kalki praised makers for adapting Face/Off for Tamil sensibilities making into a gripping family thriller and added despite Harish's role having grey shades, one can never hate him because of the way his character sketched while also praising Arun Pandiyan's character for finding clues well. He also praised Jerome Pushparaj's background score but criticised the placement of songs. Malini Mannath of Chennai Online wrote "In his second film, the actor-director has chosen a different subject, and despite its shortcomings, what keeps it going is the fast pace, unpredictable sequences, characters with grey shades, and a fairly engaging narrative style that at least doesn't test one's patience".
