= Ennai Thalatta Varuvala =

- Poster
- Directed by: K. S. Ravindran
- Story by: P. M. Vedimuthu
- Produced by: P. M. Vedimuthu
- Starring: Ajith Kumar; Vignesh; Sumi
- Cinematography: Magi Natesh
- Edited by: V. M. Uthayasankar
- Music by: Ashoka
- Production company: Muthalaya Films
- Release date: 21 March 2003
- Country: India
- Language: Tamil

Ennai Thalatta Varuvala (transl. Will She Come to Cradle Me?) is 2003 Indian Tamil-language thriller film directed by K. S. Ravindran and produced by P. M. Vedimuthu, who also wrote the story. The film stars Vignesh and Reshma (credited as Sumi) with Ajith Kumar in an extended cameo appearance. The production began in the mid-1990s, but the film was released only on 21 March 2003.

== Plot ==
The film centers around Vennila's connections with the three men in her life. Sathish wins a college competition and becomes the object of Vennila's ire. In a fit of pique, Vennila feigns love to him, gets him to marry her, and then ditches him on the wedding night. The whole affair leaves Sathish in a state of shock, and he is later hospitalized and gets into a deep coma. Santhosh is a new entrant to the college. He chooses Vennila for his games of one-upmanship, leaving her puzzled as to his motive. Amar is Vennila's fiancé from abroad. She later realizes that he is a psychopath. Vennila later finds that she is pregnant, and is shocked since she has not had a physical relationship with any of the men. Soon, she realizes that it was the past catching up with her, and it was a planned vendetta by Sathish's dear ones.

== Cast ==
- Ajith Kumar as Sathish (extended cameo appearance)
- Vignesh as Santhosh
- Sumi as Vennila
- Jai Ganesh as Sivaraman
- Amar Siddique as Amar
- Ramji (special appearance in the song "Ennathula")
- Sathyapriya as Santhosh and Satish's mother
- C. R. Saraswathi as Saraswathi
- S. V. Ramadas
- Lavanya as Vennila's friend
- Dhamu

== Production ==
The film was earlier titled as Vennila, after the name of the character portrayed by Sumi, but later renamed after a song from Kadhalukku Mariyadhai (1997). The film began production works in 1995 and the project faced delays due to financial problems with the film finally releasing in March 2003.

== Soundtrack ==
Soundtrack was composed by Ashoka.

- Ennamma - Mano, S. Janaki
- Ennathula - Vedimuthu
- Marikozhundhu - Mano
- Naan Paartha Nilavu - Mano
- Nesa Roja - S. P. Balasubrahmanyam, Sadhana Sargam

== Reception ==
Malini Mannath wrote for Chennai Online, "The film [...] has been years in the making and the script has undergone changes along the way. Not surprisingly it has a faded look". Malathi Rangarajan of The Hindu wrote, "The storyline is an attempt at being different. And that is about the only positive of [Ennai Thalatta Varuvala]", adding that "But nothing makes an impact because the flawed screenplay and direction makes watching [Ennai Thalatta Varuvala] a tiring exercise".
