= Zamana (2010 film) =

- Title card
- Directed by: Shankar Adithya
- Written by: Shankar Adithya
- Screenplay by: Shankar Adithya
- Produced by: Chethan
- Starring: Nithish J. P.; Aakarsha; Jackie Shroff
- Cinematography: Niranjan Babu
- Edited by: R. D. Ravi
- Music by: Karthik Raja
- Production company: Mysore Touring Talkies Group
- Release date: 2 July 2010
- Country: India
- Language: Kannada

Zamana is a 2010 Indian Kannada-language action drama film directed by Shankar Adithya. The plot revolves around a software professional (Nithish J. P.) leading a normal life, who gets entangled in the underworld led by circumstances. It also features Aakarsha and Jackie Shroff in pivotal roles while Sadhu Kokila, Vineeth Kumar and Sundar Raj appear in supporting roles. This movie was completed in 2008 but delayed for 2 years and finally released in 2010.

== Cast ==
- Nithish J. P. as Anil
- Aakarsha as Swati
- Jackie Shroff as Ramakanth Tyagi
- Sadhu Kokila
- Vineeth Kumar
- Leena Sidhu
- Sundar Raj
- Bharath Bhagavathar
- Patre Nagaraj
- Layendra
- Vaijanath Biradar
- Malathi Sardeshpande
- Sanjay Suri
- Muzahid Pasha

== Production ==
Zamana is the second Kannada film to feature Bollywood actor Jackie Shroff, who dubbed his own lines.

== Music ==
Zamana

Soundtrack album by Karthik Raja
- Released: 2010
- Genre: Feature film soundtrack
- Language: Kannada
- Label: Lahari Music

Karthik Raja chronology
| Kudiyarasu (2009) | Zamana (2010) | Rettaisuzhi (2010) |

Karthik Raja scored the film's background music and for its soundtrack. Lyrics for the soundtrack were written by Sudarshan, Jayanth Kaikini, Tushar Ranganath and K. Kalyan.

Track listing
| No. | Title | Lyrics | Singer(s) | Length |
|---|---|---|---|---|
| 1. | "El Elu Janmakku" | Sudarshan | Ilayaraja, Shweta Mohan |
| 2. | "Thanmaya Naanu" | Jayanth Kaikini | Udit Narayan, Bela Shende |
| 3. | "Madhumagale Ene Ninna Golu" | Tushar Ranganath | Kunal Ganjawala, Rita |
| 4. | "Bandalu Bandalu Mandakini" | Tushar Ranganath | MNM, Sujatha Mohan |
| 5. | "Happy Happy Birthday" | K. Kalyan | Tippu, Sujatha Mohan |

== Reception ==
IANS stated that Shroff was the "only saving grace" in the film that was "marred by a loose script and a predictable story".
