= Harish Raghavendra =

Indian singer

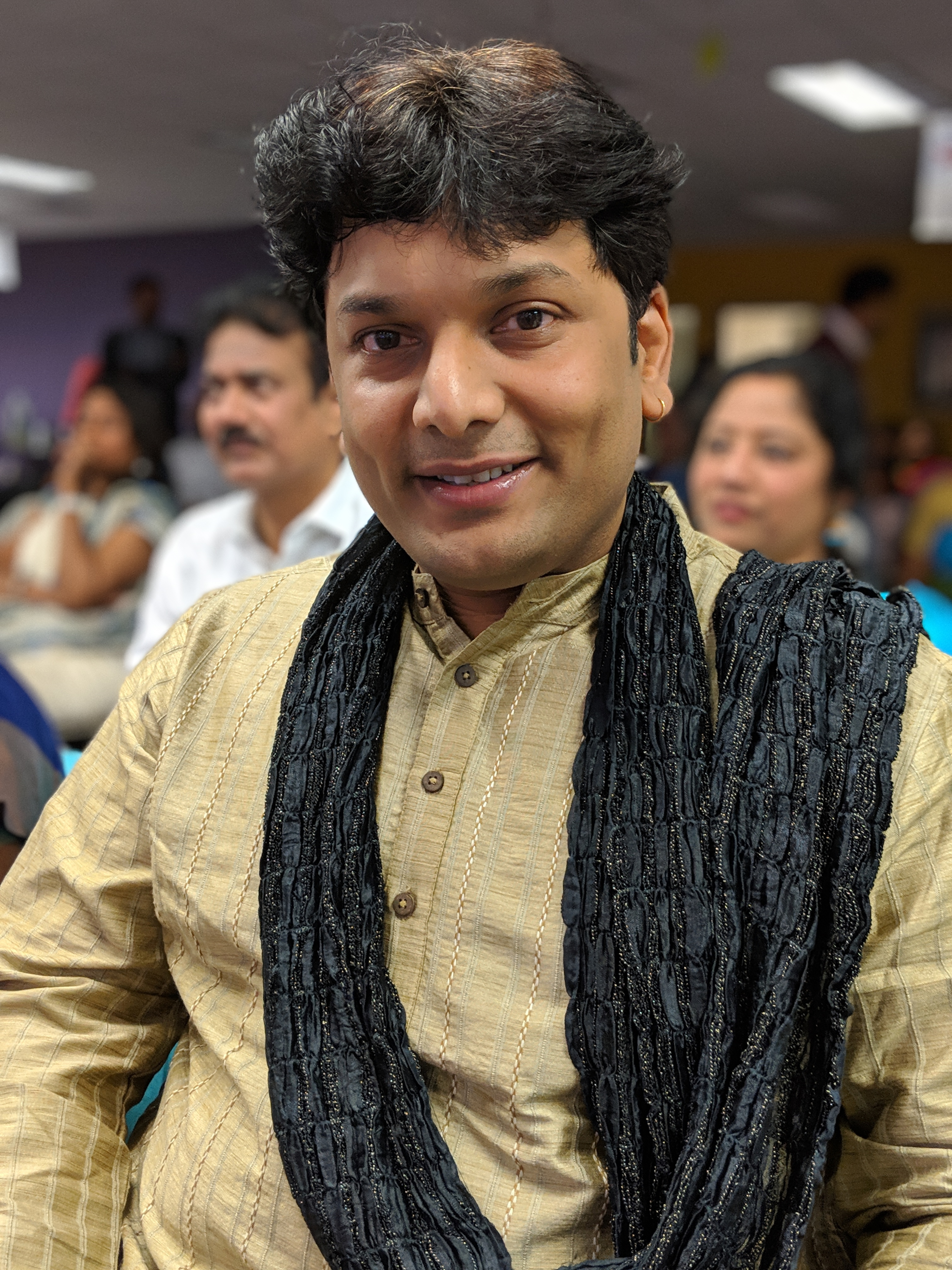
- Harish Raghavendra

Background information
- Born: Harish Raghavendran; 7 December 1976 (age 49)
- Origin: Palladam, Coimbatore,Tamil Nadu, India.
- Occupations: Playback singer, Actor
- Years active: 1998–present

Harish Raghavendra (born 7 December 1976) is an Indian singer who has worked mainly in Tamil films. He is the son of photographer P.V Raghavendran. Harish is best known for his songs like "Hey Azhagiya Theeyee" from Minnale, "Nirpadhuve Nadapadhuve" from Bharathi, "Devathayai Kanden" from Kadhal Kondein, "Sakkarai Nilave" from Youth, "Melliname Melliname" from Shahjahan and "Anbe Enn Anbe" from Dhaam Dhoom. He has also acted in a few Tamil movies. He debuted as an actor in Vikadan directed by Arun Pandiyan in which he played the lead role. He also played a brother-role for Ajith Kumar in Thirupathi, which was written and directed by Perarasu.

== Career ==
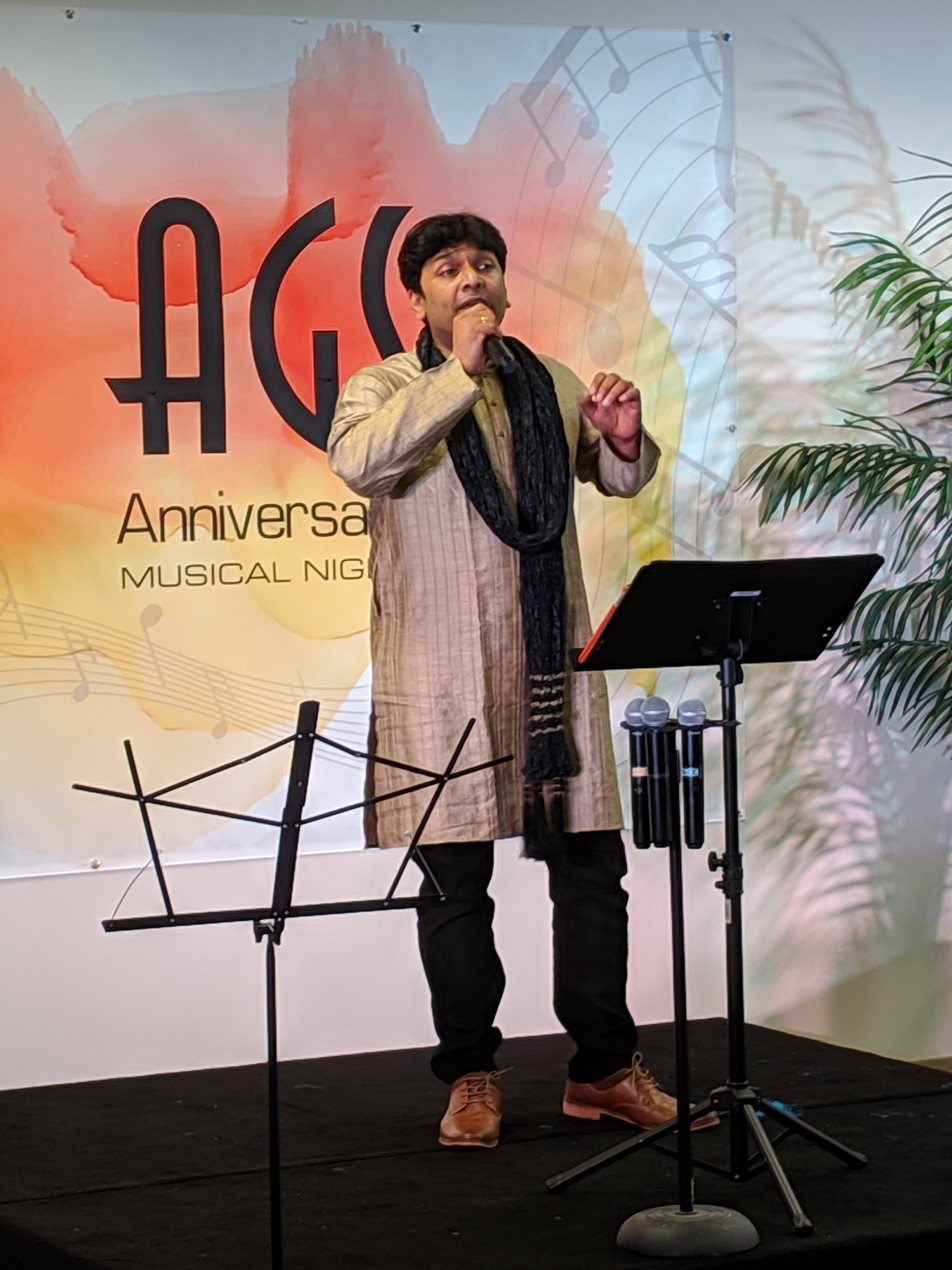
Harish Raghavendra at a musical event at Atlanta in 2019

Harish officially made his debut into the music industry as a singer at the age of 18. His first song was a Telugu song for the movie Panjaram and he subsequently sung 'Vaa Saghi' for the movie Arasiyal. He was in his final year of college at the time. After that, he was not really active in the music industry. In the meantime, he graduated from Vivekananda College with a degree in commerce and masters in mass communication and journalism.

He re-entered the music industry through the well known classical song Nirpadhuve Nadapathuve from the movie Bharathi. The music was composed by Ilaiyaraja. The song became a massive hit back in the year 2000 and it brought him fame along with Tamil Nadu State award. This was the time he changed his name from Harish to Harish Raghavendra, per Ilaiyaraja's recommendation. Before he could even join the software industry, Ye Azhagiye Theeye from Minnale scored a roaring success back to back. Since then, he has sung over 3000 songs in various Indian language movies, predominantly Tamil. He has worked for most of the well known music composers that include Yuvan Shankar Raja, Vidyasagar, G. V. Prakash Kumar, D. Imman, Vijay Antony, Harris Jayaraj and many others. His charming sharp voice has always been a point of attraction for many music directors, so he managed to sing in various languages such as Tamil (his main passion), Telugu, Kannada, Malayalam and Hindi. He has sung some devotional songs as well. After 'Panjaram', he sang for the Telugu film Neetho under Vidyasagar's baton. Since then he has sung many more songs in Telugu, including films like 'Cheli', 'Priyadarshini' and Ghajini.

Harish's latest project include a song about Mahakavi Bharathi – Engal Tamizhe (https://www.youtube.com/watch?v=0PdcG3WTQ94) and the translation, composition and rendition of the Tamil classic Thirukkural (https://www.youtube.com/watch?v=xE1mIRCEgHg). He also wrote a book "Kadhal Kavithai Puthagam Alla".

Having sung many classic hits for the major music directors, Harish is considered to be one of the leading professional singers in Tamil Music Industry. He has also judged many reality shows along with few other famous singers. Harish has also done a number of live concerts in various countries as well. Lately, he also grabbed a Diploma in Yoga in Krishnamacharya style.

== Awards ==
- Tamil Nadu State Film Award for Best Male Playback Singer in 2000

== Discography ==
=== Tamil ===
Year	Movie	Song title	Music director	Co-singers
1997	Arasiyal	"Vaa Sagi Vaa Sagi"	Vidyasagar	Uma Ramanan
1997	Thaali Pudhusu	"Sirage Illatha Poonkuruvi"	Vidyasagar	Sujatha
1998	Kondattam	"Ini Sudhanthira Dhiname"	M. M. Keeravani	S. P. Balasubrahmanyam, M. M. Keeravani, Minmini
1999	Annan Thangachi	"Sivappu Kallu"	Deva	Sangeetha
1999	Maanaseega Kadhal	"Kandha Kadamba"	Deva	Krishnaraj, Master Rohith
2000	Bharathi	"Nirpathuve Nadapathuve"	Ilaiyaraaja	
2001	Minnale	"Azhagiya Theeye"	Harris Jayaraj	Timmy
2001	Minnale	"Nenjai Poopol"	Harris Jayaraj	
2001	Dheena	"En Nenjil"	Yuvan Shankar Raja	
2001	Dumm Dumm Dumm	"Desingu Raja"	Karthik Raja	Sujatha
2001	Dumm Dumm Dumm	"Krishna Krishna"	Karthik Raja	Karthik, Febi Mani
2001	Paarvai Ondre Podhume	"Thirudiya Idhayathai"	Bharani	K. S. Chithra
2001	Majunu	"Mudhal Kanave"	Harris Jayaraj	Bombay Jayashree, O. S. Arun
2001	Poovellam Un Vasam	"Chella Nam Veetuku"	Vidyasagar	Sujatha, Malaysia Vasudevan
2001	12B	"Poove Vaai Pesum"	Harris Jayaraj	Mahalakshmi Iyer
2001	Shahjahan	"Melliname"	Mani Sharma	
2001	Vaanchinathan	"Sirikkum Sirippil"	Karthik Raja	Swarnalatha
2001	Krishna Krishna	"Aandavan Namaku"	S. A. Rajkumar	Anuradha Shekher
2002	Charlie Chaplin	"Aval Kanna Paarthaa"	Bharani	S. P. Balasubrahmanyam
2002	Charlie Chaplin	"Vaarthai Thavari"	Bharani	
2002	Thulluvadho Ilamai	"Kaattrukku Kaattrukku"	Yuvan Shankar Raja	Harini, Febi Mani, Sunder Rajan
2002	Youth	"Sakkarai Nilave"	Mani Sharma	
2002	Samurai	"Aagaya Sooriyanai"	Harris Jayaraj	Harini
2002	Yai Nee Romba Azhaga Irukey	"Yamini Yamini"	Arvind-Shankar	
2002	Sri	"Vasantha Sena Vasantha Sena"	T. S. Muralidharan	K. S. Chithra
2002	Run	"Minsaram En Meedhu"	Vidyasagar	Sadhana Sargam, Jack Smelly
2002	Album	"Kadhal Vanoli"	Karthik Raja	Sujatha
2002	April Mathathil	"Yeh Nenje"	Yuvan Shankar Raja	Sadhana Sargam
2002	Solla Marandha Kadhai	"Gundu Malli"	Ilaiyaraaja	Shreya Ghoshal
2002	Punnagai Desam	"Doli Doli"	S. A. Rajkumar	Unnikrishnan, Swarnalatha, Dr. Narayanan
2002	Thamizh	"Kadhelenum Jorula"	Bharadwaj	Ganga
2002	Pesatha Kannum Pesume	"Vinnaivittu"	Bharani	Sumithra
2002	En Mana Vaanil	"Kuthu Kuthu"	Ilaiyaraaja	Karthik, Mano, Sujatha, S. N. Surendar
2002	Mutham	"Orampo Orampo"	Bharani	K. S. Chithra
2002	Mutham	"Tigirtana"	Bharani	Swarnalatha
2003	Winner	"Engirunthai Naan"	Yuvan Shankar Raja	
2003	Whistle	"Whistle Adikkum"	D. Imman	Ganga, Anuradha Sriram
2003	Vikadan	"Yaarivalo Yaarivalo"	Jerome Pushparaj	
2003	Vikadan	"Oomai Paadum"	Jerome Pushparaj	
2003	Lesa Lesa	"Yedho Ondru"	Harris Jayaraj	Srilekha Parthasarathy, Franko
2003	Kadhal Kondein	"Thottu Thottu"	Yuvan Shankar Raja	
2003	Kadhal Kondein	"Devathaiyai Kandaen"	Yuvan Shankar Raja	
2003	Kurumbu	"Vaa Maasakatre"	Yuvan Shankar Raja	Srinivas, Srilekha Parthasarathy, Subiksha
2003	Punnagai Poove	"Vaanam Thoovum Poo"	Yuvan Shankar Raja	Kovai Ranjani
2003	Kadhal Kirukkan	"Poove Mudhal Poove"	Deva	
2003	Yes Madam	"Aada Ponnu"	Bharani	
2003	Yes Madam	"Bam Bam Barala"	Bharani	Anuradha Sriram
2003	Kadhal Sadugudu	"Ramshikku Ramshikku"	Deva	K. S. Chithra
2003	Paarai	"Naan Oru Kanaa Kanden"	Sabesh–Murali	Sujatha
2003	Diwan	"Oru Thaalaattu"	S. A. Rajkumar	
2003	Pithamagan	"Kodi Yethi Vaippom"	Ilaiyaraaja	Bhavatharini, Shanmugasundari, Periya Karuppu Thevar
2003	Soori	"Oh My Lover"	Deva	Harini
2003	Soori	"Pirivellam" (solo)	Deva	
2003	Soori	"Pirivellam" (duet)	Deva	Chinmayi
2003	Indru	"Karthikai Aanavale"	Deva	Sujatha
2003	Sindhamal Sitharamal	"Satrumun Kidaitha"	Bharani	Srimathumitha
2003	Sindhamal Sitharamal	"Thee Thee"	Bharani	
2004	M. Kumaran S/O Mahalakshmi	"Chennai Senthamizh"	Srikanth Deva	
2004	7G Rainbow Colony	"Idhu Porkalama"	Yuvan Shankar Raja	
2004	7G Rainbow Colony	"Kanaa Kaanum Kaalangal"	Yuvan Shankar Raja	Srimathumitha, Ustad Sultan Khan
2004	Autograph	"Manasukulle Dhaagam"	Bharadwaj	Reshmi
2004	Giri	"Kishu Kishu Manusha"	D. Imman	Mathangi
2004	Arasatchi	"Oh Muhalai Muhalai"	Harris Jayaraj	Harini
2004	Vaanam Vasappadum	"Vaanin Uyaram"	Mahesh Mahadevan	Gopika Poornima
2004	Sema Ragalai	"Agravin Aarambamae"	Simmam Kumar	Harini
2004	Dreams	"Unnai Unnai"	Bharadwaj	Camli
2004	Dreams	"Uyire Uyire"	Bharadwaj	
2004	Jananam	"Neethaane Emmele"	Bharadwaj	Chinmayi
2004	Kaadhal	"Pura Koondu"	Joshua Sridhar	Suresh Peters, Tippu, Premgi Amaren, Karunas
2004	Ramakrishna	"Thathi Thavidum"	Deva	
2005	Devathaiyai Kanden	"Azhage Brammanidam"	Deva	Ganga
2005	Thirupachi	"Kannum Kannumthaan"	Mani Sharma	Uma Ramanan, Premgi Amaren
2005	Karka Kasadara	"Noothanaa Nee"	Prayog	Chinmayi
2005	Jithan	"Kadhaliye"	Srikanth Deva	
2005	Anbe Vaa	"Kaal Koluse"	D. Imman	Balram
2005	Oru Kalluriyin Kathai	"Kadhal Enbadhu"	Yuvan Shankar Raja	Chinmayi
2005	Ayodhya	"Aayiram Meena Enn Nenjai"	Sabesh–Murali	
2005	Jathi	"Kanavillaiye Thediparkiren"	Agni Kalaivani	
2005	Thaka Thimi Tha	"Idhu Kallooriyalla"	D. Imman	
2005	Sevvel	"Kalla Parvai"	Aasan	Harini
2005	Priyasakhi	"Kangalinal"	Bharadwaj	Janani Bharadwaj
2005	6′.2″	"Maatenguthu"	D. Imman	Anuradha Sriram
2005	Kadhal Seiya Virumbu	"I Love You"	G. Ram	Febi Mani
2005	Neeye Nijam	"Pennalla Devadai"	John Peter	
2005	Kaatrullavarai	"Sevandhiye Sevandhiye"	Bharani	
2005	Kaatrullavarai	"Unnai Nambithan"	Bharani	B. Sumi
2005	Alaiyadikkuthu	"Chee Chee Poda"	Bharani	Mahathi
2005	Ponniyin Selvan	"Vennilaa"	Vidyasagar	Cicilly
2005	Karpanai	"Pennai Naan"	Santhosh Jayaraj	Sujatha
2005	Thirudiya Idhayathai	"Ithanai Nalaai"	Bharani	
2005	Kanda Naal Mudhal	"Koo Koovena"	Yuvan Shankar Raja	Karthik, Mahalakshmi Iyer
2006	Kodambakkam	"Ragasiyamanathu"	Sirpy	Harini
2006	Thirupathi	"Sollavum Mudiyala"	Bharadwaj	Swarnalatha
2006	Thiruvilaiyaadal Aarambam	"Vizhigalil Vizhigalil"	D. Imman	
2006	Oru Kadhal Seiveer	"Mutham Koduda"	Bharani	Pop Shalini
2006	Kai Vandha Kalai	"Kadhal Inikuthappa"	Dhina	
2006	Kusthi	"Thakadheem"	D. Imman	D. Imman, Lavanya
2006	Yuga	"Oolala Olala"	Dhina	Suchitra, Dev Prakash
2006	Nee Venunda Chellam	"Ethanai Jenmam"	Dhina	Sadhana Sargam
2006	Sengathu	"Thee Thee"	Arafin Yusuf	
2006	Aavani Thingal	"En Usira Thottu"	R. Shankar	
2006	Prathi Gnayiru 9 Manimudhal 10.30 Varai	"Ottrai Roja"	John Peter	
2006	Azhagiya Asura	"Eppadi Eppadi"	Brahma	
2006	Thirudi	"Vizhigal Randum"	Bharani	Saindhavi
2007	Agaram	"Line Kidaichidiche"	Yuvan Shankar Raja	Shardha
2007	Nanbanin Kadhali	"Vaazhthu Paada Vanthaen"	Deva	
2007	Madurai Veeran	"Nee Thaanadi"	Srikanth Deva	
2007	Dhandayuthapani	"Adikkadi Ethayathil"	Sunil and E. L. Indhrajith	Harini Sudhakar
2007	Achacho	"Aallipoove"	M. K. S. Narula Khan	Prasanna
2007	Karuppusamy Kuththagaithaarar	"Kaadhal Enbathu"	Dhina	O. S. Arun, Malgudi Subha, Dhina, Dev Prakash
2007	Nee Naan Nila	"Kadhal Kadhal"	Dhina	
2007	Nee Naan Nila	"Unnai Sandhithaen"	Dhina	Harini
2007	Veerappu	"Puliya Kili Jeyicha"	D. Imman	Madhushree
2007	Ammuvagiya Naan	"Unnai Saranadainthen"	Sabesh–Murali	Kalyani
2007	Thoovanam	"Eureka"	Isaac Thomas Kotukapally	
2007	Piragu	"Mudalil Santhithen"	Srikanth Deva	Meganthi
2007	Veeramum Eeramum	"Oru Kshanam"	Yugendran	Srilekha Parthasarathy
2007	Agra	"Kadhal Vali"	C. S. Balu	
2007	Puli Varudhu	"Kanava Nejama"	Srikanth Deva	Anuradha Sriram
2008	Dhaam Dhoom	"Anbe En Anbe"	Harris Jayaraj	
2008	Kadhalil Vizhunthen	"Thozhiya En Kadhaliya"	Vijay Antony	Vijay Antony, Sri Charan
2008	Pidichirukku	"Kaatrodu Solli"	Manu Ramesan	Sujatha
2008	Kannum Kannum	"Kutralaam Kutralaam"	Dhina	Malathy
2008	Ini Varum Kaalam	"Kashmirin Roja"	Bharani	
2008	Ini Varum Kaalam	"Eppa Unnai Pathalum"	Bharani	Roshini
2008	Madurai Ponnu Chennai Paiyan	"Punnagai"	Kanmani Raja	
2008	Unnai Naan	"Uyirile Unnai Naan"	Joe Arulraj	
2008	Ragasiya Snehithane	"Vasantha Kalangal"	John Peter	
2008	Kasimedu Govindan	"Beeda Maava"	Soundaryan	
2008	Thenavattu	"Enge Irundhai"	Srikanth Deva	
2009	Satrumun Kidaitha Thagaival	"Konjam"	Bala	Chinmayi
2009	Adada Enna Azhagu	"Deepavali"	T. M. Jayamurugan and Jeevan Thomas	Mano, Mukesh Mohamed, Kalyani, Saindhavi, Anuradha Sriram
2009	Karthik Anitha	Anchu Viralaivichan"	Jack Anand	
2009	Aarumaname	"Chithiram Pesuthadi"	Srikanth Deva	Sadhana Sargam
2009	Eesa	"Oru Murai Nee Paarthal"	Haran	Bombay Jayashree
2009	Nesi	"Ennodaya"	Sirpy	Shweta Mohan
2009	Madurai Sambavam	"Oru Ilavum Panju"	John Peter	Sadhana Sargam
2009	Thozhi	"Sandhana Kuilay" (male)	R. Shankar	
2009	Ayan	"Nenje Nenje"	Harris Jayaraj	Mahathi
2009	Renigunta	"Mazhai Peyyum"	Ganesh Raghavendra	
2010	Thairiyam	"Ilamiyil Mogam"	R. D. Mohan Singh	Anuradha Sriram
2010	Gowravargal	"Aaha Soka Vachan"	Dhina	Saindhavi
2010	Ochayee	"Kammangaatukule"	Jeevaraja	Bhavatharini
2010	Kalavani	"Oru Murai Iru Murai"	S. S. Kumaran	Srimathumitha
2011	Engeyum Kadhal	"Nenjil Nenjil"	Harris Jayaraj	Chinmayi
2011	Mayakkam Enna	"Ennenna Seidhom"	G. V. Prakash Kumar	
2011	Mambattiyan	"Chinna Ponnu Selai"	S. Thaman	Shaila, Sanjeev Kumar
2011	Aayiram Vilakku	"Rathiye En Rathiye"	Srikanth Deva	Chinmayi
2011	Raa Raa	"Anbum Aranum"	Srikanth Deva	Surmukhi Raman
2012	Kettavarellam Padalam	"O Snekidhi"	R.D Burman original rearranged	
2012	Neerparavai	"Raththa Kannee"	N. R. Raghunanthan	
2012	Padam Parthu Kadhai Sol	"Ival Yaaro"	Ganesh Raghavendra	Chinmayi
2012	Medhai	"Nilavukku Piranthaval Evalo"	Dhina	Chinmayi
2012	Ullam	"Kai Veesamma"	Yuvan Shankar Raja	Chitra Sivaraman
2012	Kadhal Pisase	"Swasamai"	Brunthan	Kanthini
2012	Nanda Nanditha	"Jimke Marina"	Emil Mohammed	Emil Mohammed, Karthik, Tippu, Srinivas
2012	Krishnaveni Panjaalai	"Aathaadi"	N. R. Raghunanthan	Sithara
2012	Eppadi Manasukkul Vanthai	"Oru Paarvayile"	A. J. Daniel	
2012	Pandi Oliperukki Nilayam	"Azhagana Nilavu"	Kavi Periyathambi	
2013	Mathapoo	"Adada Idhayam Parakiradhe"	Velayudham	
2013	Mathapoo	"Unparvai Velichaththile"	Velayudham	
2013	Mathil Mel Poonai	"Oru Poo Pookiradhu"	Ganesh Raghavendra	Harini
2013	Kurumbukara Pasanga	"Enthan Thalaiyil"	Arul Raj	Srimathumitha
2014	Idhu Kathirvelan Kadhal	"Anbe Anbe"	Harris Jayaraj	Harini
2014	Hogenakkal	"Poove Poove"	G. V. Prakash Kumar	Nimmi
2014	Ninaithathu Yaaro	"Konjum Punnagai"	X.Paulraj	Vinaya
2014	Thirumanam Ennum Nikkah	"Yaaro Ival"	Ghibran	Yazin Nizar, Krishna Iyer
2015	Muthu Nagaram	"Onnapathi Yaar"	Jayaprakash	
2015	Kalai Vendhan	"Enge Enge"	Srikanth Deva	
2015	Om Shanthi Om	"Enendru Solvadho"	Vijay Ebenezer	Shweta Mohan
2017	Singam 3	"Mudhal Muraiyaga"	Harris Jayaraj	Shweta Mohan, Ramya NSK, Karthik
2019	Vilambaram	"Azhagazhagai"	J. Vimal Raj	
2020	Onbathu Kuzhi Sampath	"Ennenna Idhayathile"	Va Charlie	
2023	Raththam	"Nee Ennai Mannipaya"	Kannan	
2025	Baby and Baby	"Yenna Thavam Seitheno"	D. Imman	Shweta Mohan
2025	Neranjiye (Album)	"Neranjiye"	Saran Prakash	Padmaja Sreenivasan

=== Telugu ===
Year	Movie	Song title	Music director	Co-singers	Notes
1997	Panjaram	"Yugalenni Saaginaa"	Raj		Debut song.
2001	Cheli	"Hey Vennala Sona"	Harris Jayaraj	Timmy	"Azhagiye Theeye" song in Tamil from the movie Minnale
2003	Raghavendra	"Nee Styele"	Mani Sharma	Sujatha Mohan	Based on the song "May Maadha Megam" in Tamil from the movie Shahjahan
2004	Nenu	"Devathala Ninnu Chustunna"	Vidyasagar		
2005	Ghajini	"Hrudayam Ekkadunnadi"	Harris Jayaraj	Bombay Jayashree	"Suttum vizhi chudare" song in Tamil from the movie Ghajini
2006	Raghavan	"Banam Vesade"	Harris Jayaraj	Bombay Jayashree	"Paartha Mudhal Naale" song in Tamil from the movie "Vettaiyadu Vilaiyadu"
2007	Raju Bhai	"Evvare Nuvvu"	Yuvan Shankar Raja		Based on the song "Devathaiyai Kanden" in Tamil from the movie Kadhal Konden
2007	Don	"Ithandanga Unnave"	Raghava Lawrence		
2007	Don	"Mudde Pettu"	Raghava Lawrence	Saindhavi	
2008	Surya S/o Krishnan	"Naaloney Pongeynu"	Harris Jayaraj	Devan, V.V.Prasanna	"Nenjukkul Peidhidum Maamazhai" song in Tamil from Vaaranam Aayiram
2011	Rakshakudu	"Choopey Nee Choopey"	Harris Jayaraj		"Anbe En Anbe" song in Tamil from Dhaam Dhoom
2014	Seenugadi Love Story	"Nuvve Nuvve"	Harris Jayaraj	Harini	"Anbe Anbe Ellam Anbe" song in Tamil from Idhu Kathirvelan Kaadhal
2024	Valari	"Kathamalupey"	TS Vishnu		

=== Kannada ===
Year	Movie	Song title	Music director	Co-Singers
2005	Amruthadhare	"Nee Amruthadhare"	Mano Murthy	Supriya Acharya
2007	Sixer	"Nanna Preethiyalli"	Hamsalekha	
2007	Sixer	"Oye Thangali"	Hamsalekha	

== Television/ Media ==
Year	Title	Role	Channel	Notes
2012	Manadhodu Mano	Guest	Jaya TV	Exclusive interview filled with music and memories. Host Singer Mano.
2012	Sooda Oru Talk	Guest	Sathyam TV	Musical journey.
2013	Special Interview	Guest	Maalaimalar	Musical journey.
2014	Manam Thirumbuthe	Guest	PuthuYugam TV	Deepavali special interview show.
2015	Varaverpparai	Guest	News7 Tamil	Day break show.
2020	Songs, Songs & more Songs	Guest	Muthirai TV	Interview on Muthirai TV (chanakyaa.in). Host Balaji.
2020	Melody Conversation	Guest	Cinema Vikatan	Casual music conversation.
2020	Vanakkam Tamizha	Guest	Sun TV	Celebrity interview in the live breakfast show.
2020	Yoga Day	Guest	Muthirai TV	Virtual interview on Muthirai TV (chanakyaa.in). Host Balaji.
2020	Oru Kuralai	Guest	Silver Tree	Special interview for USCT fundraising, along with Singer Mahathi. Host Ranjith Govind.
2021	Special Interview	Guest	Behindwoods TV	Online interview sharing music memories.
2023	Enna Paatu Paada	Guest	Tamil Nostalgia	Fun filled music quiz show. Host Priya Parthasarathy.
2023	Special Interview	Guest	IndiaGlitz Tamil	Music then and now interview.
2023	Christmas Special Interview	Guest	Mediacorp Oli 968	Singapore FM radio interview. Host RJ Neruppu Guna.
2024	Super Singer Season 10	Guest	Star Vijay	Special song "Vizhigalil Vizhigalil". Also performed along with contestants Vaishnavi and Sreenidhi.
2024	Vintage Voice	Guest	Sun News	"குரல் மூலம் Time Travel செல்லலாம் வாங்க"
2024	Nenjil Nenjil	Guest	Cinema Vikatan	Short interview at Vikatan Awards
2025	Special Podcast	Guest	Radio City Tamil	Nostalgic interview - career stories and fun musical trivia. Host RJ Shakthi
2025	Super Singer Junior season 10	Guest	Star Vijay	Special song "Melliname Melliname". Also performed along with contestants Priyanka, SriVarshini and Nazreen.
2025	Mudhal Kanave	Guest	Astro Ulagam - RAAGA	Radio (RAAGA) interview at Malaysia during mega concerts Mudhal Kanave 1.0, 2.0.
2025	Chai with Chithra - Part 1	Guest	Touring Talkies	Open talk with Chithra Lakshmanan in the famous Chai with Chithra show.
2025	Chai with Chithra - Part 2	Guest	Touring Talkies	Open talk with Chithra Lakshmanan in the famous Chai with Chithra show.
2025	Chai with Chithra - Part 3	Guest	Touring Talkies	Open talk with Chithra Lakshmanan in the famous Chai with Chithra show.
2026	Express Specials	Guest	Cinema Express	Not just music.., interview explored more on his passion, travels and views on spectrum of things
2026	Valentine’s Day Special Podcast	Guest	SPlus Productions	Interesting new gen style podcast with fun games and songs.

== Acting career ==
- All films are in Tamil, unless otherwise noted.

Year	Title	Role	Notes
2003	Vikadan	Ram Mohan	Debut Film as Actor
2005	Karpanai	Mathi	
2006	Thirupathi	Thirupathi's brother	

- Harish Raghavendra released a single "Engal Tamizhe" in 2009.
- Harish Raghavendra and Vijayalashmi sang "Mudhal Kadhal " in 2014. This is from Mudhal Kadhal which is a Tamil Pop album.
- Harish Raghavendra sang "Thirukkural"
