= Uma Shankari =

Indian actress

- Born: Uma Shankari
- Other name: Uma
- Occupations: Actress, Dancer
- Years active: 2000–2007 (films); 2012–2013 (television)
- Spouse: H. Dushyanth (m. 2006)
- Parent(s): D. Rajendra Babu; Sumithra
- Family: Nakshatra (sister)

Uma Shankari is an Indian actress who appeared in regional Indian language films.

== Career ==
In 2006, she appeared in Sakthi Chidambaram's Kovai Brothers opposite Sibiraj, featuring as Sathyaraj's niece and also featured in Thodamaley alongside newcomers. She has also acted in a few serials like Chikamma (the remake of the famous Tamil serial "Chithi" in Kannada) and Valli (a new Tamil serial).

== Personal life ==
Uma was born to D. Rajendra Babu, a commercial director in Kannada film industry, and actress Sumithra, who appeared in regional Indian films. Her younger sister, Nakshatra, made her debut with the film Doo in 2011. Alongside films, she studied B.A, English literature in Indira Gandhi Open University.

She married software engineer H. Dushyanth in Bangalore on 15 June 2006 and opted against signing any more films thereafter.

== Filmography ==
Year	Film	Role	Language	Notes
2000	Veeranadai	Poomayil	Tamil	
2000	Vaanavil	Uma	Tamil	
2001	Ammo Bomma	Lakshmi	Telugu	
2001	Kalakalappu	Mini	Tamil	
2001	Navvuthu Bathakalira	Sarala	Telugu	
2001	Kadal Pookkal	Kayal	Tamil	
2002	Kuberan	Gauri	Malayalam	
2003	Chokka Thangam	Maragatham	Tamil	
2003	Vasanthamalika	Nandhini	Malayalam	
2003	Vikadan	Kaveri	Tamil	
2003	Kalyana Ramudu	Kalyani's sister	Telugu	
2003	Saphalam	Gracey	Malayalam	
2003	Soori	Rishaba / Priya	Tamil	
2004	Thendral	Thamaraiselvi	Tamil	
2004	Rightaa Thappaa	Viji	Tamil	
2004	Ee Snehatheerathu	Gayathri	Malayalam	
2004	Swamy	Seetha, Geetha	Telugu	
2005	Amudhae	Vinaya	Tamil	
2005	Selvam	Thendral	Tamil	
2006	Uppi Dada M.B.B.S.	Dr. Uma/ Chinnu	Kannada	
2006	Lakshmi	Swathi	Telugu	
2006	Kovai Brothers	Ganesh's sister	Tamil	
2006	Thodamaley	Manju	Tamil	
2006	Ilakkanam	Kayalvizhi	Tamil	
2006	Kallarali Hoovagi	Noor Jahan / Ratna	Kannada	
2006	Adaikalam	Thamizh	Tamil	
2007	Manikanda	Lakshmi Manikandan	Tamil	
2007	Rasigar Mandram	Bharathi	Tamil	
2014	Bhagyalakshmi	Priya	Tamil	
2017	Munsif		Kannada	
2022	Valimai	Young Lakshmi	Tamil	

=== Television ===
Year	Film	Role	Language	Channel
2012-2013	Chikamma		Kannada	Udaya TV
2012-2013	Valli	Valli	Tamil	Sun TV
