= Red Flower =

2025 Indian dystopian thriller film

- Theatrical release poster
- Directed by: Andrew Pandian
- Written by: Andrew Pandian
- Produced by: K Manickam
- Starring: Vignesh; Manisha Jashnani
- Cinematography: K Deva Surya
- Edited by: Aravinthan Arumugam
- Music by: Santhosh Ram
- Production company: Sri Kaligambal Pictures
- Release date: 8 August 2025
- Country: India
- Language: Tamil
- Budget: ₹9 crore

Red Flower is a 2025 Indian Tamil-language post-apocalyptic action thriller film written and directed by Andrew Pandian in his directorial debut, starring Vignesh in a dual role alongside Manisha Jashnani. The film is produced by K Manickam, under his Sri Kaligambal Pictures banner.

Red Flower was theatrically released on 8 August 2025 to negative reviews.

== Cast ==
- Vignesh in a dual role as Vicky and Michael
- Manisha Jashnani
- Andrei Ilapichev
- Mehdi Shah
- Nassar
- Y. G. Mahendran
- Suresh Menon
- John Vijay
- Thalaivasal Vijay as Lucifer
- Ajay Rathnam
- Mohan Raman
- Leela Samson
- Gopi Kannadasan
- T. M. Karthik
- Yog Japee

== Production ==
The film is directed by visual effects expert Andrew Pandian in his directorial debut, starring Vignesh in a dual role as twin brothers and Manisha Jashnani as the female lead. The film is produced by K Manickam, under his Sri Kaligambal Pictures banner, under a budget of Rs.9 crore, revealed by the producer at a promotional event in Sooramangalam. Set in the dystopian period, the film stars Russian actors Andrei Ilapichev and Mehdi Shah in key roles, alongside Nassar, John Vijay, and Thalaivasal Vijay in important roles. The technical team consists of cinematography done by K Deva Surya, music by Santhosh Ram and editing handled by Aravinthan Arumugam.

== Release ==
Red Flower was theatrically released on 8 August 2025.

== Reception ==
Abhinav Subramanian of The Times of India gave 2/5 stars and wrote "The film's one saving grace, perhaps, is its unwavering commitment to its own absurdity. It never pumps the brakes, hurtling towards its ridiculous conclusion with a kind of admirable, if misguided, confidence. It's a total train wreck, but you can't look away. Red Flower isn't a great movie, but you certainly can't accuse it of being dull." Maalai Malar gave 1.5/5 stars by criticizing the film for its poor screenplay, illogical sequences, and the poor performance of the lead actor, Vignesh. The film was also reviewed by Dina Thanthi.
