= Aacharya (2006 film) =

- Directed by: Ravi
- Written by: Ravi
- Produced by: S. N. Raja; E. Chitra; V. Uma Maheshwari
- Starring: Vignesh; Divya
- Cinematography: Rajavel Mohan
- Edited by: Suresh Urs
- Music by: Srikanth Deva
- Production company: ITA Films
- Release date: 23 June 2006
- Running time: 120 minutes
- Country: India
- Language: Tamil

Aacharya is a 2006 Indian Tamil-language gangster drama film written and directed by Ravi, an erstwhile assistant of Bala. The film stars Vignesh and newcomer Divya, with Nassar, Charan Raj, Vadivukkarasi, Ganja Karuppu, Thennavan, Devan and C. Ezhumalai playing supporting roles. The music was composed by Srikanth Deva with cinematography by Rajavel Mohan and editing by Suresh Urs. The film released on 23 June 2006.

== Plot ==
Yadhunandhan was born in a very poor Brahmin family. He lived in an Agraharam in Mannargudi and had to go on a daily alms round to collect food. His father left the family at an early age, and his mother died shortly after. A kind-hearted Muslim man took the young Yadhunandhan with him and became his adoptive father.

Many years later, the pious Yadhunandhan comes to the city Madurai with his degrees in hand to look for a job. One night, the thief Kokki steals Yadhunandhan's bag, and the police arrest the innocent Yadhunandhan for no reason. Police Inspector Sivanandi has sympathy for Yadhunandhan, so he offers him a temporary job. Yadhunandhan does all the dirty work in the police station. He gets his daily food and sleeps in the station. The situation forces Sivanandi to plead with Yadhunandhan to accept a crime he has not committed. In jail, Yadhunandhan crosses over Kokki, who advises him to stay away from the police and convinces him to meet Mayakka. Upon release from prison, he meets Mayakka, the authoritarian gang leader who lords over the market. Impressed by Yadhunandhan's kind words, Mayakka takes him under her wing and gives him a place to live. Yadhunandhan is now called Saamy. The soft-spoken Yadhunandhan easily befriends Mayakka's gang members, and Yadhunandhan discovers that Mayakka is, in fact, a kindhearted person who joined the underworld for a living after the murder of her rowdy husband.

Mayakka, along with six others, works for the local bigwig Annavi Thevar, an influential and intimidating figure. Annavi Thevar rules the criminal underworld of the city, and even the police department is afraid of him. In the meantime, Yadhunandhan and Devakosa Mangai fall in love. Yadhunandhan then helps Devakosa Mangai get selected as a police officer thanks to Annavi Thevar's influence. Koorumathi is a gang leader who wants to control Mayakka's market, so he and his henchmen brutally murder Mayakka in broad daylight. Thereafter, SP Thiruvasagam advises Koorumathi to surrender. Yadhunandhan, who is a pacifist and God-fearing man, decides to kill Koorumathi with the help of his friends for murdering Mayakka. On his way to the magistrate's house, Koorumathi is killed by Yadhunandhan in cold blood.

The murders of Mayakka and Koorumathi trigger a brutal gang war, and the police have been overtaken by the events. The government gives free rein to the police to stop the gang war and to encounter all the rowdies. Yadhunandhan and his friends have no choice but to hide from the police. Yadhunandhan then realizes that Annavi Thevar sold out to the police to save his life. Sivanandi then arrests Yadhunandhan, but instead of encountering him, he sends him to jail because the former felt guilty for sending the latter to jail in the past. Devakosa Mangai becomes a police officer and swears to Yadhunandhan that she will save him at any cost. Thiruvasagam wants Yadhunandhan to disclose the place where the other rowdies are hiding. Yadhunandhan then convinces him not to kill the rowdies but to punish Annavi Thevar, the real culprit of this mess. Yadhunandhan swears that he and the other rowdies will testify against Annavi Thevar.

At the court, two killers and a mole in the police department, appointed by Annavi Thevar, try to attack Yadhunandhan but fail. In a desperate move to save Annavi Thevar, his faithful henchman Pammathan threatens to shoot if the police do not release Annavi Thevar. Thiruvasagam shoots Pammathan in the leg, and Pammathan then triggers his gun. The bullet hits Devakosa Mangai, and she dies on the spot. The film ends with Yadhunandhan bursting into tears and his adoptive father taking Yadhunandhan with him.

== Cast ==
- Vignesh as Yadhunandhan (Saamy)
- Divya as Devakosa Mangai
- Nassar as Annavi Thevar
- Charan Raj as SP Thiruvasagam
- Vadivukkarasi as Mayakka
- Ganja Karuppu as Kokki
- Thennavan as Koorumathi
- Devan
- C. Ezhumalai as Inspector Sivanandi
- Kadhal Saravanan as Pammathan
- Vichu as Jeevanlal Seth

== Production ==
Ravi, who entered the cinema field, came from director Bala's school of learning. As the story is based on real-life events, director Ravi obtained written permission from the people being portrayed in the film. Actor Vignesh signed to play the lead role of a Brahmin who tries hard to uphold the rituals and traditions that are fast disappearing.

== Soundtrack ==
Aacharya

Soundtrack album by Srikanth Deva
- Released: 2006
- Recorded: 2006
- Genre: Feature film soundtrack
- Length: 23:17
- Language: Telgu or Hindi
- Producer: Srikanth Deva

Srikanth Deva chronology
Evandoi Srivaru (2006)	Aacharya (2006)	Dharmapuri (2006)

The film score and the soundtrack were composed by Srikanth Deva. The soundtrack, released in 2006, features 8 tracks with lyrics written by Na. Muthukumar.

Track	Song	Singer(s)	Duration
1	"Androru Thai"	Sriram Parthasarathy	3:29
2	"Nijamai Nijamai"	Manikka Vinayagam	3:34
3	"Idhu Enna"	Bharadwaj	5:23
4	"Kathavai Thirandhu"	Karthik	2:36
5	"Kannai Katti"	Senthildoss	2:19
6	"Oru Thuli Eru Thuli"	S. P. Balasubrahmanyam	5:05
7	"Uyirin Uirey"	Senthildoss	2:51
8	"Yar Yaro"	Sathyan, Azhagu Murugan	1:57

== Reception ==
P. V. Sathish Kumar wrote, "Even if Ravi steers the narrative towards the inevitable cornball conclusion with little care for subtlety, Aacharya is still most certainly a movie worth watching". Sify stated, "Vadivukarasi as Mayakka is simply superb and Charanraj as cop is good. For Vignesh, it is a comeback vehicle and he has done his best while Nassar is riveting as the guy with negative shades" and concluded that the film "is one of the better movies in the gangster genre".

Indiaglitz.com wrote, "Ravi has proved that he has the fire in him to make offbeat entertainers. A welcome addition to the directors keen on rendering movies on new themes". A reviewer from tamilcinema.com wrote, "Aacharya is somewhat different and more fast-paced than the typical action films, it will be a successful film." Cinesouth wrote "Director Ravi’s screenplay makes one’s heart ache to see the hero has nothing or nobody last for him".
