= Gomathi Nayagam =

2004 film directed by Ponvannan

- Directed by: Ponvannan
- Written by: Ponvannan
- Produced by: Aroma Mani
- Starring: Ponvannan; Haripriya; Karthika
- Cinematography: K. B. Ahmed
- Edited by: K. Pazhanivel
- Music by: M. Jayachandran
- Production company: Sunitha Productions
- Release date: 24 December 2004
- Running time: 135 minutes
- Country: India
- Language: Tamil

Gomathi Nayagam is a 2004 Indian Tamil language comedy film directed by Ponvannan. The film stars Ponvannan, Haripriya and Karthika, with Manivannan, Ilavarasu, Ponnambalam, Devan, Vishnu Prasad, Madhan Bob, Halwa Vasu and Kottachi in supporting roles. The film, produced by Aroma Mani, was released on 24 December 2004.

== Plot ==
In a remote village, Kunjappan is a carefree man who has the dream of becoming a cinema hero and he renames himself as Gomathi Nayagam to avoid embarrassments. His innocent relative Sevanthi is in love with Gomathi Nayagam but Gomathi Nayagam is adamant about being single until he becomes a cinema hero. In the meantime, Parameshwari arrives at the village with her family to become the new school teacher. Aravindan who is in love with Parameshwari since the college days comes to the village to charm her and Gomathi Nayagam decides to help him.

Later, Gomathi Nayagam's parents want him to marry Parameshwari but Gomathi Nayagam refuses. Meanwhile, Parameshwari's mother has a heart attack and on her hospital bed, she gets a promise from Gomathi Nayagam that he will marry Parameshwari. Gomathi Nayagam then plans to have a fake marriage with Parameshwari but things get complicated and after a misunderstanding, Gomathi Nayagam marries Parameshwari for real. After the marriage, Gomathi Nayagam reveals that he doesn't love her and Parameshwari decides to change his mind. Thereafter, all the issues are solved and Gomathi Nayagam finally understands Parameshwari's true feelings. Gomathi Nayagam eventually decides to direct and produce his own film to become a cinema hero.

== Cast ==
- Ponvannan as Kunjappan/Gomathi Nayagam
- Haripriya as Parameshwari
- Karthika as Sevanthi
- Manivannan as Nanjappan, Gomathi Nayagam's father
- Ilavarasu as Kutraleeswaran
- Ponnambalam as Sevanthi's father
- Devan
- Vishnu Prasad as Aravindan
- Madhan Bob as Varadharajan
- Halwa Vasu as Bheem Boy
- Kottachi as Pazhani
- Periya Karuppu Thevar
- Sumithra as Dhanam
- Saranya Ponvannan
- Vanitha Krishnachandran as Thangam
- Sathyapriya as Parameshwari's mother
- Ramya as Manju
- K. Sivasankar as Himself (cameo appearance)

== Production ==
Ponvannan, who played character roles and acted in TV serials, returned to direction with the film titled Gomathi Nayagam. He also played the lead role, handled the story, screenplay, and the dialogue in this film. Haripriya and Karthika were selected to play the heroines. Produced by Malayalam film producer Aroma Mani for Sunitha Productions, the film had in the supporting cast Manivannan, Ponnambalam, Ilavarasu, Devan, Vishnu Prasad, Saranya Ponvannan, Vanitha Krishnachandran and Sumithra. The music director of Malayalam film M. Jayachandran made his debut in Tamil cinema and Palani Bharathi had penned all the songs. The film had cinematography by K. B. Ahmed, editing by K. Pazhanivel, and art by Sreeni. The film was shot in places like Pollachi, Kerala, Pondicherry, Chennai and Sri Lanka. Speaking of the film, Ponvannan said, "It will be on the lines of comedies like Avvai Shanmughi and Thenali".

== Soundtrack ==
The soundtrack was composed by M. Jayachandran.

All lyrics are written by Palani Bharathi.

Track listing
No.	Title	Singer(s)	Length
1.	"Enga Cinema"	K. L. Sreeram	3:28
2.	"Enga Cinema" (2)	M. Jayachandran	3:28
3.	"Yaaru Yaaru Enga"	Alfa Krishnaraj, Sujatha	3:58
4.	"Roja Pole"	Mano, Sadnhya	3:55
5.	"Valayosai"	Hariharan, Sadhana Sargam	4:23
6.	"Sitharuthu"	Ilango, Karthik	3:47
Total length:			19:31
