= Karpanai =

- Directed by: Ashok Raj
- Written by: Prasanth Jayaraj (dialogues)
- Screenplay by: Ashok Raj
- Story by: Sudhi Nambiar
- Produced by: V. Radha Krishnan
- Starring: Harish Raghavendra; Keerthi; Sudhi Nambiar; Arpitha
- Cinematography: K. C. Rajush
- Edited by: K. Madhu
- Music by: Santhosh Jayaraj; Karun
- Production company: Parvathi Films
- Release date: 16 September 2005
- Running time: 110 minutes
- Country: India
- Language: Tamil

Karpanai (transl. Imagination) is a 2005 Tamil-language romantic drama film directed by Ashok Raj and produced by V. Radha Krishnan. The film stars Harish Raghavendra, Keerthi, Sudhi Nambiar and Arpitha, with Srikanth, Rajeev, Kadhal Sukumar, Mayilsamy, Nimmy, Srilatha, and Benjamin playing supporting roles. The music was composed by Santhosh Jayaraj with cinematography by K. C. Rajesh and editing by K. Madhu. The film was released on 16 September 2005.

== Plot ==
Mathi (Harish Raghavendra), a happy-go-lucky youngster, returns to his village after studying at a hostel in Chennai. Upon his arrival, he falls under the spell of the college student and Bharatanatyam dancer Malar (Keerthi). Mathi was in love with Malar when he was a kid, and he even gave her a love letter. Malar's elder brother Sakthivel (Sudhi Nambiar) and Mathi then fought and started to hate each other. When Mathi's father knew about it, he punished his son by sending him to a hostel in the city.

Sakthi and Mathi's elder sister Selvi (Arpitha) are secretly in love for many years, and they want to get married with their parents' approval, whereas Malar reciprocates Mathi's love. As the years passed, the hatred intensifies between Sakthi and Mathi. One day, Sakthi witnesses Mathi and his sister romancing, and Sakthi scolded her. Thereafter, Malar gets a chance to play a sister role in a film. She accepts the role with the support of her family. Following the success of the film, a film manager gives her an opportunity to play a heroine role and compels her to come to Chennai. The two lovers have disappeared the same night, and Sakthi tries to track down the couple.

Many days later, a distraught Malar returns to her village alone. Malar's body is then found hanging from a tree, and her postmortem report reveals that she was sexually abused. Mathi returns home and then has a fight with Sakthi. Mathi then explains that he did not elope with her. That night, he and his friends decided to attend a birthday party in Chennai, so they went there without people knowing it. Sakthi then apologizes for mistaking him.

Later, Mathi gives the film manager a lift. During the talk, the manager confessed that he had brainwashed Malar to come to Chennai and that he had raped her. An outraged Mathi crashed the car into a rock and killed the manager, while also injuring himself in the process. In his hospital bed, Mathi begs Sakthi to take care of his sister Selvi and then dies of his injuries.

== Cast ==
- Harish Raghavendra as Mathi
- Keerthi as Malar
- Sudhi Nambiar as Sakthivel
- Arpitha as Selvi
- Srikanth as Mathi's father
- Rajeev as Sakthivel's father
- Kadhal Sukumar as Nallakudiyan
- Mayilsamy as "Nalvaakku" Paramasivan
- Nimmy as Shenbagam
- Srilatha as Karpagam
- Benjamin as Vegetable Seller
- Ajish
- Smitha in a special appearance

== Production ==
Parvathi Films is producing a film called Karpanai directed by Ashok Raj in which the young playback singer cum actor, Harish Raghavendra, signed to play the lead role. The story has been penned by Sudhi Nambiar, and he will play the secondary hero. K. C. Rajush was selected to handle the camera, Suresh Urs the editing and Santhosh Jayaraj the music.

== Soundtrack ==
Karpanai

Soundtrack album by Santhosh Jayaraj
- Released: 2005
- Recorded: 2005
- Genre: Feature film soundtrack
- Length: 22:46
- Label: New Music
- Producer: Santhosh Jayaraj

The soundtrack were composed by Santhosh Jayaraj. The soundtrack, released in 2005, features 5 tracks with lyrics written by Prasanth Jayaraj and Sudhi Nambiar.

Track	Song	Singer(s)	Duration
1	"Kannaney"	K. S. Chithra	3:56
2	"Nandu Oruthu"	S. P. Balasubrahmanyam, Malathy Lakshman	3:36
3	"Nenjil"	S. P. Balasubrahmanyam, K. S. Chithra	5:41
4	"Orukadal"	Karthik	4:42
5	"Pennai Naan"	Harish Raghavendra, Sujatha Mohan	4:51
