= Malarinum Melliya =

- Directed by: P. S. Selvaraj
- Written by: P. S. Selvaraj
- Produced by: Sugumari Rajamanokaran
- Starring: Vignesh; Varshini
- Cinematography: K. V. Mani
- Edited by: R. K. Udhayakumar
- Music by: Soundaryan
- Production company: Divyadharshini Production
- Release date: 9 May 2008
- Running time: 130 minutes
- Country: India
- Language: Tamil

Malarinum Melliya (transl. Softer than flower) is a 2008 Tamil language romantic drama film directed by P. S. Selvaraj. The film stars Vignesh and Varshini, with Sivachakravarthi, Periyar Dasan, P. S. Selvaraj, Dhadha Muthukumar, Muthukaalai, and Nellai Siva playing supporting roles. The film, produced by Sugumari Rajamanokaran, was released on 9 May 2008. Actor Vignesh's voice was dubbed by dubbing artist Sekar and he won the Tamil Nadu State Film Award for his work.

== Plot ==
A school teacher (P. S. Selvaraj) enters the village to take up the vacant teacher's post in the village school. Upon his arrival, he is intrigued to see the villagers gathering in front of a large house. The village cartman (Periyar Dasan) tells him that the old man Elango, who is the village leader and respected by people, is between life and death, and explains Elango's life story.

In the past, Sundaravadanam (Sivachakravarthi) was a rich village chief whom the villagers held in high esteem. He loved his village as much as his family. Elango (Vignesh), being Sundaravadanam's eldest son had a lot of responsibilities and followed in his father's footsteps. Sundaravadanam was against love marriage and only believed in arranged marriage. He believed that his family's honor came first. Elango then fell under the spell of the bubbly girl Sandhya (Varshini), the daughter of the local temple priest (Dhadha Muthukumar). Elango declared his love to Sandhya, and after initial refusal, she reciprocated. Sundaravadanam, who punished so many lovers before, found it hard to swallow that his own son was in love. Sundaravadanam then publicly humiliated Sandhya's father. Instead of eloping, Elango decided to argue with his father to convince him to accept the marriage. Sundaravadanam and Elango's mother Kamala, shocked by the words of their son, both died of heart attacks. Elango was obliged to become the new village chief as per the village's rule. The villagers then beat up Sandhya and her father for tarnishing the image of the village. Sandhya and her father left the village, but before Sandhya left, she told Elango that her love was pure and faithful. Elango then remained single and worked hard for the good of his family and village.

Back to the present, Sandhya arrives to see her aged lover Elango who is battling for life. Sandhya remained single and loved Elango so much that she would not marry another man. The film ends with Sandhya feeding cow's milk to Elango (Thalaikoothal) to end his sufferings and both dying.

== Cast ==
- Vignesh as Elango
- Varshini as Sandhya
- Sivachakravarthi as Sundaravadanam
- Periyar Dasan as Cartman
- P. S. Selvaraj as Teacher
- Dhadha Muthukumar as Gurukkal
- Muthukaalai
- Nellai Siva
- Latha as Elango's sister
- Sharmila as Elango's sister
- Joy
- Gopi
- Vijayabhaskar
- Veera
- Puthugai Manimaran
- Sundar
- Maheshwari
- Karpagam
- Nagalakshmi

== Production ==
Vignesh was chosen to play the lead role, while Varshini was selected to play the daughter of a temple priest who fell in love with Vignesh. The film was shot in Pudukkottai, Kodaikanal, Aranthangi, Nattarasankottai, Tiruchirappalli, Thanjavur, Sriperumbudur and Chennai.

== Soundtrack ==
Malarinum Melliya

Soundtrack album by Soundaryan
- Released: 2007
- Recorded: 2007
- Genre: Feature film soundtrack
- Length: 23:17
- Producer: Soundaryan

The film score and the soundtrack were composed by Soundaryan. The soundtrack, released in 2007, features 5 tracks with lyrics written by Muthu Vijayan, Kavimugil, Seerkazhi Sirpy and Balamurugan.

Track	Song	Singer(s)	Duration
1	"Kannukotta"	Ranjith, Roshini	4:46
2	"Nijamai Nijamai"	Mukesh, Vinaya	4:27
3	"Adada Adada"	Mukesh	4:45
4	"Vizhiyoramaai"	Mukesh	4:51
5	"Kathal Sammatham"	Vinaya	4:28

== Reception ==
A critic from Nowrunning.com rated the film 2 stars out of 5 and wrote, "Films with new or up and coming artistes are generally not talked about much. Malarinum Melliya, set in the rural background, is one such film, but deserves critical acclaim". The film was a box office failure.
