= Hamsavardhan =

Indian actor

- Occupations: Actor, businessman
- Spouse: Reshma
- Children: 3
- Father: Ravichandran

Hamsavardhan is an Indian actor who has acted in Tamil language films.

== Career ==
Hamsavardhan was initially set to make his debut in Anandham Anandham which had begun production in 1998, though the film was delayed and later released as Vadagupatti Maapillai (2001) The delays meant that he started another film with the same director, V. C. Guhanathan, titled Mahajithan, but the project did not develop. Likewise, a project titled Vendumadi Nee Yenakku, also co-starring Abbas, Karan and Preetha Vijayakumar also failed to materialise. Hamsavardhan's first release was Maanaseega Kadhal, playing a dual role, but the film performed poorly at the box office. Likewise, another project titled Ammu where he featured opposite Abitha was also shelved during the period.

In 2002, he appeared in the commercially successful multi-starrer Punnagai Desam, starring alongside Tarun, Sneha, Preitha and Kunal. The film won good reviews with a critic noting that Hamsavardhan "is an energetic new find – the debut didn't do much for this lad, but Punnagai Desam proves that he does have the potential." He made his Telugu debut under the stage name Harshavardhan in the multistarrer Kondaveeti Simhasanam playing Laya's boyfriend. He was also seen that year in Junior Senior, playing a parallel lead role alongside veteran Malayalam actor Mammooty, but the film became a surprise failure at the box office.

He appeared in his father's directorial venture again in Manthiran, and the film made headlines for the father-son combination. It was subsequently announced that his father would make another film with him titled Kandeepan and that he had signed on to appear in Nagu's Idiot, but the former film remained unmade and in the latter he was replaced by Yogi. His next release was Piragu, which he shaved his head for, but the film also went unnoticed. Other films including Guru and Bomman were started in 2009, but were also subsequently never finished.

In 2012, the actor turned out for the Chennai Rhinos in the Celebrity Cricket League. In 2018, he announced his acting comeback through a project titled Peetru, which is yet to release.

== Personal life ==
Hamsavardhan married actress Reshma, his co-star from Vadagupatti Maapillai (2001) who died in 2021. The couple had two sons and a daughter. He married Nimisha in 2025.

== Filmography ==
| Year | Film | Role | Notes |
|---|---|---|---|
| 1999 | Maanaseega Kadhal | Hamsavirdhan, Madhan | |
| 2001 | Vadagupatti Maapillai | Vijay | |
| 2002 | Punnagai Desam | Selvam | |
| 2002 | Kondaveeti Simhasanam | Aravind | Telugu film credited as Harshavardhan |
| 2002 | Junior Senior | Sakthi | |
| 2002 | Nettru Varai Nee Yaaro | Deva | |
| 2003 | Inidhu Inidhu Kadhal Inidhu | Ajay | |
| 2005 | Manthiran | Hamsa | |
| 2007 | Piragu | Sathya | |
