= Manthiran =

2005 film

- Poster
- Directed by: Ravichandran
- Written by: Ravichandran
- Produced by: Ravichandran
- Starring: Hamsavardhan; Sruthi
- Cinematography: Karthik Raja
- Music by: Dhina
- Production company: Sai Baba Creations
- Release date: 8 December 2005
- Country: India
- Language: Tamil

Manthiran is a 2005 Indian Tamil-language romantic drama film directed by Ravichandran and starring Hamsavardhan and Shruthi Raj. The film is based on the story of Pon Navarasu.

== Cast ==
- Hamsavardhan as Hamsa
- Shruthi Raj as Abhi
- Rajan P. Dev as a local gangster
- Kadhal Sukumar
- Balaji
- Besant Ravi
- Azhagu
- Delhi Ganesh as House owner
- Ravichandran in a cameo appearance
- Abhinayashree in a cameo appearance

== Production ==
Ravichandran made his debut as a director with this film. The film stars his son, Hamsavardhan, in the lead role, and his co-produced by Balaji, Hamsavardhan's brother. Raga debuts as the heroine with this film and Abhinayashree worked on an item number. The songs are choreographed by Sridhar and K. Sivasankar.

== Reception ==
Sify wrote that "Hardly a twist, Mandiran is as soggy as the recent rains". Chennai Online wrote "The young actor [Hamsavardhan], with some forgettable films behind him, has handled his role with competence, using his body language and voice modulation to good effect". The film was unsuccessful at the box office.
