= Lakshana (actress) =

Indian actress

Lakshana, also known as Krishnendu, is an Indian actress working in Malayalam and Tamil films.

== Career ==
She played a child artist in films such as Kaiyethum Doorath (2002). She made her Tamil debut with Sivakasi (2005) as Vijay's sister. After being noticed for her role, she was cast as one of the leads in Thirumagan (2006).

== Filmography ==
Year	Film	Role	Language	Notes
2001	Vakkalathu Narayanankutty	Kukkoo's friend	Malayalam	
2002	Kaiyethum Doorath	Tony's friend	Malayalam	
2003	Kalavarkey	Lisy	Malayalam	
2003	Swantham Malavika	Malavika's sister	Malayalam	
2003	Balettan	Balachandran's sister	Malayalam	
2003	Mr. Brahmachari	Muslim girl	Malayalam	
2003	Varum Varunnu Vannu	Johnny's relative	Malayalam	
2004	Njan Salperu Ramankutty	Seema's friend	Malayalam	
2004	Kakkakarumban	Sreedevi	Malayalam	
2004	Govindankutty Thirakkilanu	Nandhini	Malayalam	
2004	Kottaram Vaidyan	Ganga	Malayalam	
2005	Achuvinte Amma	Rukhiya	Malayalam	
2005	Maniyarakallan	Sona	Malayalam	
2005	Sivakasi	Vairam	Tamil	
2005	Gomathi Nayagam	Jamandhi	Tamil	
2007	Thirumagan	Vairasilai	Tamil	
2008	Tharagu		Tamil	
2008	Ayyavazhi		Tamil	
2008	Ek Police	Aruna	Telugu	
2008	Sound of Boot	Sofiya Hassan	Malayalam	
2008	Parunthu	Seetha	Malayalam	
2008	Chempada	Reshmi	Malayalam	
2009	Eesa	Selvi	Tamil	
2009	Bhagavan	Doctor	Malayalam	
2009	Venalmaram	Ammu	Malayalam	
2009	Aarupadai		Tamil	
2009	Thottupaar	Kanimozhi	Tamil	
2010	Surangani		Tamil	
2010	Aunty Uncle Nandagopal	Usha	Telugu	
2011	Kaliyuga Ganapathy		Tamil	
2011	Avan Varuvan		Tamil	
2012	Kangalum Kavipaduthey		Tamil	
2013	Kavasam		Tamil	

== Television ==
=== Serial ===
- Oonjal (DD Malayalam)
- Pakida Pakida Pambaram
- Manasaveena (Mazhavil Manorama)
- Hridayam Sneha Sandram (Mazhavil Manorama)
- Kunju Malakha (Mazhavil Manorama)

=== Shows ===
- Flowers Oru Kodi - Participant
- Sarigama - Participant
