= Periyar Dasan =

Indian scholar (1949–2013)

- Born: Seshachalam; 21 August 1949; Madras, Madras Province, Dominion of India (now Chennai, Tamil Nadu, India)
- Died: 19 August 2013 (aged 63); Chennai, Tamil Nadu, India
- Occupations: Philosophy Professor, Actor
- Employer: Pachaiyappa's College
- Political party: MDMK
- Spouse: Vasantha
- Children: 2

Dr. Periyar Dasan or Dr. Abdullah (born Seshachalam; 21 August 1949 – 19 August 2013) was an Indian scholar, professor, eminent speaker, and activist from Tamil Nadu. He propagated atheism and rationalist ideologies for most part of his life and later converted to Islam. He has also appeared in around 15 Tamil-language films.

== Early life and background ==
Seshachalam was born into a Shaivite family on 21 August 1949 at Agaram in Perambur, a neighbourhood in present-day Chennai, Tamil Nadu, India. He was attracted towards the rationalist ideals of Periyar E. V. Ramasamy, the founder of the Dravidian movement. During his days in Pachaiyappa’s College, he changed his birth name to Periyar Dasan (ardent follower of Periyar). He was well-versed in Tamil literature, various religious studies, and English. He authored around 120 books. He served as a professor at his alma mater, Pachaiyappa’s College, for 34 years and as a corporate trainer, psychologist, psychotherapist, and students counsellor for many years.

In 1991, Dasan embraced Buddhism and added Siddhartha as a prefix to his name. He translated The Buddha and His Dhamma, a history of the life of Gautama Buddha and a compilation of Buddhist virtues, authored by B. R. Ambedkar, into Tamil. This took him to learn Pali and Sanskrit.

Taking everyone by surprise, he embraced Islam as his way of life on 11 March 2010 during a visit to Mecca and rechristened his name as Abdullah, and his wife Vasantha was given the name Fathima. Thereafter, he started giving a series of lectures on Islam. Before embracing Islam, he spent 10 years knowing the key aspects of that religion and learning the Quran and the Arabic language.

== Publications ==
=== Tamil ===
- Translator: Dr. Ambedkar's புத்தரும் அவரது தம்மமும் - Buddharum avarathu dhammamum - Buddha and his Dhamma.
- Author: இந்திய மரபும் பார்ப்பன திரிபும் - Indhiya marabum paarpana thiriyum - Indian practice and Brahminical fudging.
- Author: கல்வி கற்கும் பிள்ளையே கேளாய்... - Kalvi karkum pillaye kelaai... - Oh child being educated, listen...

== Filmography ==
- Karuththamma (1994)
- Tamizh Selvan (1996)
- Aavathum Pennale Azhivathum Pennale (1996)
- Mappillai Manasu Poopola (1996)
- Amman Kovil Vaasalile (1996)
- Kadhalar Dhinam (1999)
- Anandham (2001)
- Azhagi (2002)
- Amma Appa Chellam (2003)
- Thendral (2004)
- Azhagiya Theeye (2004)
- Ayya (2005)
- Oru Kalluriyin Kathai (2005)
- Niram (2007)
- Arai En 305-il Kadavul (2008)
- Dindigul Sarathy (2008)
- Malarinum Melliya (2008)
- Tamizh Padam (2010)
- Periyar Islathai Ettrara ? Ethirthara ? (2013)
- Veeram (2014; posthumous appearance)

== Death ==
Dasan died on 19 August 2013 at the age of 63, after fighting liver cancer. He is survived by wife Vasantha and two sons Valavan and Suratha. As per his last wish, his body was given to the Madras Medical College for Research on August 20. Immediately after death, his eyes were donated to Sankara Nethralaya.
