= Reshma (Tamil actress) =

Indian actress (died 2021)

- Born: 1978 or 1979
- Died: 21 June 2021 (aged 42)
- Other names: Shanthi
- Occupation: Actress
- Spouse: Hamsavardhan
- Children: 3

Reshma (1978/1979 – 21 June 2021) was an Indian actress who appeared in the Tamil cinema.

== Career ==
Born as Shanthi, she adopted the stage name of Reshma and made her debut with Kizhakku Mugam (1996) alongside Karthik. The success of the film meant she was signed on to appear in Kalanjiyam's Poomani (1996), and also briefly shot for Nandha featuring Ramki, which did not get completed. Another film titled Aththai Ponnu alongside Vignesh was also shelved during shoot in 1997.

Reshma also signed on to play the title role in Vennila to appear alongside Ajith Kumar, Vignesh and Amar Siddique. Though the film began production works in 1996, it was duly delayed due to financial problems with the film finally releasing with the title Ennai Thalatta Varuvala in March 2003.

== Personal life ==
Reshma married actor Hamsavardhan, her co-star from Vadagupatti Maapillai (2001). The couple had two sons and a daughter.

== Death ==
Reshma died aged 42 on 21 June 2021, following complications caused by COVID-19.

== Filmography ==
Year	Film	Role	Language	Notes
1996	Kizhakku Mugam	Poongodi	Tamil	
1996	Poomani	Pottu	Tamil	
1997	Anna Andre Nammanna	Rukku	Kannada	
1997	Killikurishile Kudumbamela	Rose Mary	Malayalam	
1998	Amar Akbar Anthony	Swathi	Kannada	
1998	Ulta Palta	Swathi	Telugu	
1999	Drona	Radha	Kannada	
1999	Maravathe Kanmaniye	Rasathi	Tamil	
2000	Nee Enthan Vaanam	Meenu	Tamil	
2000	Jee Boomba		Kannada	
2000	Poli Bhava		Kannada	
2000	Hagalu Vesha	Seetha	Kannada	
2001	Vadagupatti Maapillai	Vadivu (Jeena)	Tamil	
2001	Sravu	Kasthuri	Malayalam	
2001	Nagaravadhu		Malayalam	
2003	Ennai Thalatta Varuvala	Vennila	Tamil	

== Television ==
Year	TV Series	Role	Language	Notes
2001-2002	Alaigal	Sowmya Vijay	Tamil	TV Serial (Replaced by Sri Durga)
