= Soori (2003 film) =

- DVD cover
- Directed by: Selvan
- Written by: Selvan
- Produced by: P. Vijayakumar
- Starring: Vignesh; Uma; Vijayalakshmi
- Cinematography: Vijay Milton
- Edited by: Suresh Urs
- Music by: Deva
- Production company: Sri Kamakshi Studios
- Distributed by: Tamilini International
- Release date: 19 December 2003
- Running time: 150 minutes
- Country: India
- Language: Tamil
- Budget: ₹2 crore

Soori is a 2003 Indian Tamil-language romantic drama film, written and directed by Selvan, a former associate of director S. Shankar. The film stars Vignesh, Uma and Vijayalakshmi in the lead roles. Chinni Jayanth, Senthil and Manobala play supporting roles. Parthiban plays a thug in a guest appearance. The film, produced by P. Vijayakumar, had music by Deva while Vijay Milton and Suresh Urs were cinematographer and editor respectively. The film was released on 19 December 2003.

The film's story revolves around a sales representative who falls in love with a student. He accepts to separate from his lover for one year to test their love endurance. The youth doesn't find her after the delay as promised. The love turns into hatred and revenge, until he sees his soul mate.

== Plot ==
The story begins with Surya walking lonely during Valentine's Day. He shaves his hair and his mustache, and then takes a container lorry. He starts to remember his happy past during the travel.

Surya was a sales representative and worked with his friend Pichamuthu. His family, even knowing he played kabaddi and often got into fights, was very kind to him. One day he saw Rishaba, a college student, at the bus stop, who advised a smoker not to smoke because it disturbed non-smokers and would cause cancer. Surya was amazed by her words, so he dropped his cigarette and decided to stop smoking.

Surya wakes up screaming and a container passenger jumps with fright. The container passenger is afraid of Surya and offers him a little alcohol. Surya refuses and takes a cigarette. He goes back to his memories.

Another day, his friend and he bought black tickets from a boy at the cinema. Rishaba's friends also bought by this way, so Rishaba tore the tickets and said that the tickets would encourage the boy to have a bad future. Surya tore the tickets in turn. Then she accidentally dropped her book and Surya took it. The full night, Surya decrypted her personality by studying graphology. The next day, he brought the notebook to Rishaba with her personality description. She was surprised. Surya proposed his love and gave her a love letter. The following morning, he waited at the bus stop for her answer. She ignored him. He began to follow everywhere she went. Anxious, he called out to her when she took the bus. He requested Rishaba to come tomorrow with the same clothes which she wore now (a blue shalwar kameez) if she agreed to his love or in other clothes if she disagreed his proposal, at the same place. The next day, she came with a red shalwar kameez. Surya was vexed and he promised her that he never would cross his path again. Rishaba immediately showed him her blue shalwar kameez. She explained that her mother had put this dress on the washing machine, so she could not wear it wet. Finally, Rishaba said "I love you" to Surya. Rishaba and Surya became much closer. One day, at the river, Surya wrote on his hand Rishaba's name and his name, and showed it to her. Rishaba found that to write separately their first name took away them. She surrounded the letter of each of their names: Soori. Surya jumped for joy and shouted: "It's not her name, it's not his name, it's their name".

Back in the present, Surya takes his cigarette and burns his tattoo on his arm (which reads Soori) with it, his eyes full of rage.

Rishaba waited for Surya at the bus stop, but he didn't arrive. The next day, she got mad at him, and Surya apologized by saying that his bike was repaired. She scolded him and was upset by his carelessness after only 15 days of love. She said, "Boys are very punctual and rigorous to charm girls who they love but when girls accept their love, they become careless about them." She explains to him that lovers looked only for their plus points and after the marriage, they looked only for their minus points which engaged later divorce. She didn't want them to separate because of this matter. She wished he shared his negative habits and she shared with him her bad habits to improve them to positive things.

They were lovers for 25 days. Rishaba was afraid that time changes people affections. Surya tried to appease him but in vain. They decided to put their love to an endurance test to prove to themselves that the romance was much more than infatuation. The endurance test would last until the next Valentine's Day. Surya became less and less concentrated with what he did. Pichamuthu, after hearing a sad story of a man, phoned Rishaba to tell her that Surya had been admitted at the hospital in a serious condition. She went at the hospital upset and she didn't find him. She phoned Surya, he answered, and she hung up without talking. Surya knew the matter and slapped his friend. He said to not compare his love to others and Pichamuthu apologized. The lovers suffered the pain of separation.

One year later, at Surya's home, his friends came to congratulate him. His family didn't understand why they came to congratulate him, and Surya narrated to them his love matter. They took it easy and they were proud of the way which Surya took. They prepared for the arrival of their future daughter-in-law. Surya waited a long time at the place she promised to come. Upset, his friends and him went to her home. A woman said that Rishaba had shifted to Trichy at her husband's city. His friends presented to his family about the issue and they were shocked.

Main Guard Gate Manikandan, a thug, makes his entry at this point. He fights against people who touched his wife. He goes home and calls a woman called Priya. Uma runs, and then smears him with coloured powder and hugs him with kisses. Surya comes at Trichi to find his old friend Devi, a former prostitute. Devi feels that Surya has changed a lot. She reveals that her boyfriend is Manikandan and she then asks him to find a house for Surya.

Surya moves on the odd jobs (milk deliverer, newspaper deliverer, etc.). One day, Surya thinks he sees Rishaba and runs behind an auto rickshaw. At the same moment, Manikandan is in a photoshop and punishes the seller to scratch Rishaba's frame photo. By going out of the store, he grows by Surya and brings down the frame. The frame is broken, Manikandan beats Surya, Devi intervenes in their fight, and she makes clear that it's Surya, her close friend. Surya doesn't even see the photo. While selling Kungumam at the temple, Devi saw Surya. She asks why he does that, he replies that he searches his girlfriend everywhere where the women are presents. Surya gives to Devi Rishaba's photo. Regrettably, Devi doesn't see the photo and put it at Manikandan's pocket. The housemaid gives the shirt to a Dhobi. The dhobi finds Priya's photo and gives it to Devi. She recognizes the cover given by Surya. Shocked, she goes to clear the matter. Surya agrees that the woman on the photo was his lover and he would like to kill her. The next morning, Surya reads the newspaper and Devi sees Rishaba's photo on the paper. She managed to take it. Surya cries by seeing his family photo. Finally, the fate shows him the article with Rishaba. Surya reads the articles and goes at the mentioned address. Devi sees the burnt paper. The housemaid said to Surya that they went. Devi also goes there and the housemaid said that a bold man came here to ask this. Devi phoned to Manikandan to prevent him, that Surya will kill Priya.

Surya sees his lover and Manikandan, takes his gun and shoots in Rishaba's direction. Manikandan saves her and takes the bullet on his shoulder. Manikandan puts the gun on his breast and orders Surya to shoot. Surya refuses because his goal is killing his love's traitor. He welds the gun towards Rishaba. Rishaba takes a man's ice cream and eats it like a baby. Surya doesn't understand what happened. Manikandan reveals that she has gone mad, she doesn't know herself and Manikandan but knows only the name: Soori. Manikandan posted at the newspaper the news of her so Surya knows.

The pain of separation is the reason for her situation. She saw anywhere Surya, when she drove her scooter and she had an accident. Manikandan's sister was distributed after the accident, Rishaba hasn't any relation. So Manikandan decided to marry her. Then, just after the marriage, he read her diary and understood their hearts.

Surya, troubled and culprit, cries and refuses to marry her after wishing her death. Manikandan manages to make him accept.

Manikandan takes off the Thaali and Surya knots a new Thaali on Rishaba's neck. Devi takes Manikandan's hand and puts it on her belly, a synonym of her pregnancy. Rishaba takes from Surya's pocket a packet of cigarettes and throws it away.

== Cast ==
- Vignesh as Surya
- Uma as Rishaba/Priya
- Vijayalakshmi as Devi
- Chinni Jayanth as Pichamuthu, Surya's friend
- Senthil as Surya's friend
- Manobala as Container Passenger
- Vasu Vikram as Wine Shop Owner
- Laxmi Rattan as Surya's father
- Vijaya Singh as Surya's mother
- Pondy Ravi as Surya's friend
- Bava Lakshmanan as Surya's friend
- S. K. S Mani as Surya's grandfather
- Master Udayaraj as Black Ticket Seller
- Suryakanth as Dhobi
- Kovai Senthil as Priest
- Sridhar as Dancer ("Pirivellam")
- Parthiban as Main Guard Gate Manikandan (special appearance)

== Production ==
=== Development ===
Selvan, an institute product, has worked under director S. Shankar for two of his films, Indian and Jeans. He wanted his first feature film to be a love story with a difference. He has also produced and directed two reportages, which were screened at the International Reportages Festival in France. "The film has love, action and comedy. But the undercurrent is only love. One can find a definition for true and divine love," the director declared. "After the release of my film lovers will say that Soori is the definition of love." Shelvan announced proudly.

=== Casting ===
Vignesh immediately accepted the offer and was determined not to accept any other film before finishing this film. Monal was expected to play the lead role, but her sudden suicide prompted the team to look for other actresses. Manya was originally selected as heroine but she was later replaced by Uma, daughter of former heroine Sumithra, she would essay the role as Vignesh's love interest. R. Parthiban would make a special appearance by playing the role of a thug. Actress Vijayalakshmi, busy in Kannada cinema though she had Tamil origins, was chosen to portray an attractive role of a former prostitute and as Parthiban's love interest. Sayaji Shinde was also initially expected to play a leading role in the film, but was later left out. Names of Mantra, Vennira Aadai Moorthy, Madhan Bob, Lakshmi Rattan cropped up for the portrayal of the antagonist's role in the film. Shelvan chose his technicians : Vijay Milton to handle the camera, Suresh Urs as editor, Sai Piccaso as the art director and Super Subbarayan as the stunt master.

Deva, composed the musical score whereas his songs featured lyrics provided by Vairamuthu.

=== Filming ===
The main scenes have been shot in Tiruchi. The director was fond of the Cauvery river, so he decided to shoot the climax there. A pattimandram (English: public debate) under the stewardship of Solomon Pappaiah will be included, with regular speakers, indulging in a heated debate. Several actors shaved their head and the film's success was a turning point in their career (Sathyaraj in Amaidhi Padai, Sarath Kumar in Suriyan or still Vikram in Sethu). Vignesh tonsured his head 70 times.

The filming was held at locations in Chennai followed by Rameshwaram, Trichy, Mumbai and Kolkata. The film was postponed several times. There was an altercation between, the producer, P. Vijayakumar and, the co-producer, S. Suresh Kumar. Due to difference of opinion both the partners split when the film was almost complete. Vijayakumar had agreed to pay back the sum of 13 lakhs to Suresh as part of the settlement. Following this Vijaykumar had issued cheques on various dates. All the cheques got bounced and Suresh filed a case in the Egmore court. In the meantime, Vijayakumar went ahead with the release of Soori and even conducted a function to release the audio. An agitated Suresh now filed another case in the Madras High Court to stop the filming of Soori till his amount was paid. Justice R.Balasubramanian after hearing the case gave the verdict that Soori should not be released and directed Vijayakumar to settle Suresh's amount.

== Soundtrack ==
Soori

Soundtrack album by Deva
- Released: 2003
- Recorded: 2003
- Genre: Feature film soundtrack
- Length: 34:49
- Producer: Deva

Deva chronology
Kadhal Kirukkan (2003)	Soori (2003)	Engal Anna (2004)

The film score and the soundtrack were composed by Deva. The soundtrack, released in 2003, features 7 tracks with lyrics written by Vairamuthu.

Track	Song	Singer(s)	Duration	Choreographer	Picturization
1	"Kadavullae Kadavullae"	Hariharan	6:27	Prabhu Srinivas	Vignesh
2	"Labama Nashtama"	Anuradha Sriram	5:15	Prabhu Srinivas	Vijayalakshmi
3	"Oh My Lover"	Harish Raghavendra, Harini	6:02	Raju Sundaram	Vignesh, Uma
4	"Pirivellam" (solo)	Harish Raghavendra	5:37	Sridhar	Sridhar, Vignesh, Uma
5	"Pirivellam" (duet)	Harish Raghavendra, Chinmayi	5:37	Sridhar	Sridhar, Vignesh, Uma
6	"Vaanam Kuninthu"	Udit Narayan, Srimathumitha	5:32	Sridhar	Vignesh, Uma
7	"Pre Paida"	Timmy	5:56		

== Reception ==
=== Critical response ===
The film gained primarily mixed reviews with critics, Malathi Rangarajan of Hindu.com gave a positive review. She wrote that "Vijay Milton's excellent camera work and unique choice of angles deserve special mention" and "Sai Picasso's art, the rock temple, Srirangam, and the roads in and around Tiruchi give the narration considerable boost.". She praised the cast : "But he (Vignesh) tends to go slightly overboard, especially when he howls aloud in agony. However Vignesh's earnest effort is very much evident in these scenes. As the friendly, fun loving Surya he is more natural and appealing.", "Uma's expressive face is proof enough of her talent" and "Parthiban makes a positive impact as a henchman with a kind heart". Malathi Rangarajan concluded that "If his debut venture Soori is a sample, Shelvan sure has potential". Another critic commended the actors by saying : "Actor Vignesh has made a come back through this film. He has given a good performance. Parthiban did a commendable job. Uma is refreshingly beautiful and played her role with understanding". He claimed that the film was average. Deccan Herald wrote "Shelvan, a one time associate of Shankar, has handled the film well and the climax is bold, unusual and appreciable. The visuals in the song sequences are brilliant and Deva’s musical score is fresh".

=== Box office ===
Soori received mixed reviews and disappeared without any trace at the box office.
