= Nee Enthan Vaanam =

- Poster
- Directed by: R. K. Suresh
- Written by: R. K. Suresh
- Produced by: N. Babu Rao; V. Udaya Kumar
- Starring: Vignesh; Reshma; Charan Raj
- Cinematography: B. R. Ramakrishna
- Edited by: C. Mani
- Music by: Sangeetha Rajan
- Production company: Sun Rise Entertainers
- Release date: 22 December 2000
- Running time: 130 minutes
- Country: India
- Language: Tamil

Nee Enthan Vaanam (transl. You are my sky) is a 2000 Indian Tamil-language thriller film directed by R. K. Suresh. The film stars Vignesh, Reshma and Charan Raj, with Vadivelu, Rocky, Telephone Satyanarayana, Bhaskar, Kumarimuthu and Omakuchi Narasimhan playing supporting roles. The film, produced by N. Babu Rao and V. Udaya Kumar, was released on 22 December 2000.

== Plot ==
The film begins with three terrorists robbing an armoured government van full of cash. In the process, they kill the police officers in the vehicle. The police department is now looking for the three culprits, and the police even offers a monetary reward to whoever catches the wanted criminals. Prakash (Rocky), the head of the terrorist group, has no choice but to take refuge in Pasumalai forest with his partners Siva and Guna. According to a reliable source, the police department under the orders of Sathya (Vignesh) and Alex Pandian (Charan Raj) set a camp in the forest. Sathya is an upright and calm sub-inspector, while Alex Pandian is a disrespectful inspector. In Pasumalai forest, a small tribal group lives there, and the tribe welcomes the police force with respect.

Thereafter, Sathya falls in love at first sight with the tribal girl Meenu (Reshma), who eventually accepts his love. In the meantime, the tribal women are mysteriously killed one by one the night. Sathya first suspects Alex Pandian, who has an irreverent attitude toward women. Prakash, who prowls around in the forest, has an eye on the tribal women. Afterwards, Sathya finds a treehouse in the middle of the forest and finds the killer's personal diary.

In the past, Dheepan (Bhaskar), the killer, was a happily married man but had sexual problems. His wife Megha had an affair with his best friend, and when Dheepan knew about their affair, he killed them both and was sentenced to life imprisonment. Dheepan then managed to escape from jail, and he became a member of the tribe.

Dheepan's next target is none other than Meenu. The rest of the story is how Sathya and Alex Pandian arrest the three terrorists and the misogynist psychopath Deepan.

== Cast ==
- Vignesh as Sathya
- Reshma as Meenu
- Charan Raj as Alex Pandian
- Vadivelu as Ottaiodasal
- Rocky as Prakash
- Telephone Satyanarayana as Tribal chief
- Bhaskar as Dheepan/Rasaiah
- Kumarimuthu
- Omakuchi Narasimhan
- Joker Thulasi
- Muthukaalai
- King Kong
- Manoj
- Sahadevan
- Mahadevan
- Rasheed Ummer as Arun/Rasaiah
- Haribaba
- Babuji
- Sagar
- Varsha as Vellaiamma
- Deepika
- Lakshmipriya
- T. R. Srilekha
- Bindhu

== Soundtrack ==
The soundtrack was composed by Sangeetha Rajan, with lyrics written by Piraisoodan and Mayil.

Song	Singer(s)	Duration
"Nee Enthan Vaanam"	Srinivas	5:12
"Pattu Papa"	Anuradha Sriram	4:42
"Putham Pudhu"	Swarnalatha	4:12
"Yeah Machakaalai" (duet)	P. Unnikrishnan, Harini	5:07
"Yeah Machakaalai" (male)	P. Unnikrishnan	5:07
"Yeah Machakaalai" (female)	Harini	5:07

== Critical reception ==
Malini Mannath of Chennai Online wrote, "For a debut film, the director has a storyline and a location that is different from the routine movies. The suspense is well maintained and the narration does not lag except when the songs intrude out of context. The actors have done their jobs adequately and one cannot blame them".
