= Nettru Varai Nee Yaaro =

- Directed by: A. Sridhar
- Produced by: A. Jayaseelan
- Starring: Hamsavardhan; Ruchita Prasad
- Music by: Deva
- Production company: Nivedhitha Cine Arts
- Release date: 24 May 2002
- Country: India
- Language: Tamil

Nettru Varai Nee Yaaro (transl. Until Yesterday, I Did Not Know You) is a 2002 Indian Tamil-language romantic action film written and directed by A. Sridhar. It stars Hamsavardhan and Ruchita Prasad. The score and soundtrack for the film were by Deva.

== Cast ==
- Hamsavardhan as Deva
- Ruchita Prasad
- Sujatha as Meenakshi
- Thalaivasal Vijay
- Vaiyapuri
- Alex

== Production ==
Producer Jayaseelan of Nivedhitha Cine Arts, who had earlier made Maamanithan (1995), announced that he would cast Hamsavardhan in the lead role, alongside former Miss Bangalore pageant winner Ruchita Prasad with debutant A. Sridhar directing the film. The producer opted for the lead pair despite their relative new presence in the film industry. For his role in the film, actor Alex dressed up like politician Lalu Prasad Yadav.

== Soundtrack ==
Soundtrack was composed by Deva.

- Arubadai Veedu - Sabesh
- Sevvanthi Thottathile - Unni Menon
- Andaman Azhagai - Naveen
- Naalai Ettu Manikku - Srinivas, Harini
- Sevvanthi Thottatathile - Sujatha, Krishnaraj
- Idho Idho Oru Idhayam - P. Unnikrishnan, Swarnalatha

== Release and reception ==
A reviewer from the entertainment portal ChennaiOnline.com noted, "the opening scenes give promise of this being a film that is meaningful and with social relevance", though added "the rest of the script is slipshod, distracts from the main theme, turning the film into a mediocre entertainer".
