= Chinna Thayee =

- Directed by: S. Ganesaraj
- Written by: S. Ganesaraj
- Produced by: M. Vedha
- Starring: Vignesh; Padmashri
- Cinematography: Viswam Nataraj
- Edited by: Srinivas Krishna
- Music by: Ilaiyaraaja
- Production company: M.S.R Films
- Release date: 1 February 1992
- Running time: 140 minutes
- Country: India
- Language: Tamil

Chinna Thayee (transl. Young mother) is a 1992 Indian Tamil-language drama film directed by S. Ganesaraj. The film stars Vignesh and Padmashri. It was released on 1 February 1992.

== Plot ==
Ponrasu returns to his village after studying in the city. Ponrasu's father Veeramuthu Naicker is the religious figure of the village called "Samiyaadi" (disguised as the male deity Sudalai Madan) who delivers divine judgement in village temple poojas and whoever faces him during his 'goes for hunt event' in midnight of the temple annual festival would die in mysterious cause within few days, which would be believed as anger of the deity Sudalaiamaadan.

'Saamiyadi's son Ponrasu loves the village belle Chinna Thayee since his childhood and Chinna Thayee develops a soft corner for Ponrasu. Chinna Thayee's mother Raasamma is against their love because in the past Raasamma was in love with a singer and he dumped her after consummating their relationship. She is afraid that the same thing happens to her daughter. Raasamma is the mistress of Samundi, a brute, who is married to another person and has a child.

Raasamma brainwashed Chinna Thayee and convinced her to forget him. Chinna Thayee first avoids Ponrasu, but then they get closer and Chinna Thayee gets pregnant. In a routine ceremony of 'goes for hunt' in midnight, Raasamma encounters Veeramuthu Naicker as 'Samiyaadi' and reveals everything on their children's relationship and she implores him to kill her. Shocked, Veeramuthu Naicker ignores her. This incident is considered a bad omen by the villagers. Then, Ponrasu's parents brainwash him and the heartbroken Ponrasu returns to the city.

One day, Samundi tries to rape Chinna Thayee and during the confrontation, he kills his mistress Raasamma. At the village court, Veeramuthu Naicker solely orders Samundi to make offerings at the temple and he succeeds to cover up his son's love affair. Chinna Thayee complains it to the police and the police inspector Sankarapandian attempts to arrest Samundi. Sankarapandian faces the village's opposition, so he arrests Veeramuthu Naicker and he releases him later.

Ponrasu returns to his village and he cannot forget Chinna Thayee whereas his father forces him to marry with another girl. The previous ceremony's (Rasamma encounters saamiyadi in midnight hunt run) incident overwhelmed the entire village, so Ponrasu becomes the new 'Samiyaadi' replacing his father Veeramuthu Naicker. During the next annual ceremony, on 'goes for hunt' event in midnight, this time Ponrasu faces his lover Chinna Thayee with his newborn baby in hand asking for justice. What transpires later forms the crux of the story.

== Cast ==
- Vignesh as Ponrasu
- Padmashri as Chinna Thayee (Rajeswari in porkalam)
- Radha Ravi as Inspector Sankarapandian
- Vinu Chakravarthy as Veeramuthu Naicker
- Napoleon as Samundi
- Goundamani
- Senthil
- Sabitha Anand as Raasamma
- Vaani
- Surya
- Vasuki
- G. Jayanthi
- Vichithra as Ponnamma
- Junior Balaiah as Vathiyar
- A. K. Veerasamy
- Krishnamoorthy

== Soundtrack ==
The music was composed by Ilaiyaraaja, with lyrics written by Vaali. The song "Kottaiya Vittu" is set in Mayamalavagowla raga.

Song	Singer(s)	Duration
"Arumbarumba Saram"	P. Susheela	5:17
"Aarumuga Mangalathil"	Chorus	1:15
"Kottaiya Vittu"	S. P. Balasubrahmanyam	1:17
"Kottaiya Vittu"	S. Janaki	5:02
"Kottaiya Vittu"	Uma Ramanan, Kalpana	5:02
"Naan Erikarai"	K. J. Yesudas, Manikka Vinayagam, Swarnalatha	5:08
"Naan Erikarai"	Ilaiyaraaja	4:58
"Naan Ipothum"	S. P. Balasubrahmanyam, S. Janaki	4:55

== Reception ==
N. Krishnaswamy of The Indian Express gave the film a positive review citing "director Ganesharaj comes up with winning scenes that have elemental power, making his artistes with one another, and the audience well". He also praised the cinematographer Viswam Nataraj and Ilaiyaraaja for their work. The film completed a 100-day run at the box-office.
