= Saphalam =

- Directed by: Asok R. Nath
- Written by: Maheshraj; Madambu Kunjukuttan (dialogues)
- Screenplay by: Madambu Kunjukuttan
- Produced by: V. Anil Thomas
- Starring: Manoj K. Jayan; Balachandra Menon; Sumithra; Umashankari
- Cinematography: Madhu Neelakandan
- Music by: Jassie Gift; Ramesh Narayan
- Production company: Movie Magic
- Distributed by: Movie Magic
- Release date: 7 November 2003
- Country: India
- Language: Malayalam

Saphalam is a 2003 Indian Malayalam film, directed by Asok R. Nath and produced by V. Anil Thomas. The film stars Manoj K. Jayan, Balachandra Menon, Sumithra and Umashankari in lead roles. The film had musical score by Jassie Gift and Ramesh Narayan.

== Plot ==
This is the love story of an elderly couple, who have to undergo separation.

== Cast ==
- Manoj K. Jayan
- Balachandra Menon
- Madhupal
- Pala Aravindan
- Sumithra
- Umashankari

== Awards ==
National Film Awards 2003

- National Film Award for Best Feature Film in Malayalam

== Soundtrack ==
The music was composed by Jassie Gift and Ramesh Narayan. This was Jassie Gift's first film. The song "Thoovella Thoovunnushassin", sung by Rajesh Vijay became a chartbuster. Cassettes were not released.

No.	Song	Singers	Lyrics	Length (m:ss)
1	"Pantheeraayiram Nercha"	Vijay Yesudas	Thankan Thiruvattar	
2	"Thoovella Thoovunushassil"	Rajesh Vijay	Thankan Thiruvattar	
