= Kudiyarasu =

- Directed by: Sabir Hussain
- Written by: Sabir Hussain
- Produced by: K. Suresh Kannan; E. S. Satya Narayana
- Starring: Vignesh; Sabarna; Neepa; K. Suresh Kannan
- Cinematography: V. Babu
- Edited by: K. M. Riyas
- Music by: Karthik Raja
- Production companies: Thiruchendur Murugan Productions; Samurai Pictures
- Release date: 13 February 2009
- Running time: 105 minutes
- Country: India
- Language: Tamil

Kudiyarasu (transl. Republic) is a 2009 Tamil language action thriller film directed by Sabir Hussain. The film stars Vignesh, newcomer Sabarna, Neepa and newcomer K. Suresh Kannan, with E. S. Satya Narayana, Nizhalgal Ravi, Sethu Vinayagam, V. S. Raghavan and Srikanth playing supporting roles. It was released on 13 February 2009.

== Plot ==
The film begins with Kannan and Arthi entering a wedding hall early in the morning. Kannan was in love with the bride Radha, while Arthi was in love with the groom Rohit. Kannan hails from a middle-class family and works for a newspaper called Kudiyarasu. In the morning newspaper, "Kudiyarasu" accuses Minister Ambalavanan of cheating innocent people, and in the evening newspaper, the newspaper will publish it with the evidence. Unfortunately, Raghavan gives Kannan the wrong CD, and the newspaper editor Ram asks Kannan to find the evidence before the evening. Kannan then reads his personal diary and starts remembering his past.

A few years ago, Kannan was a M.A student in journalism thanks to the scholarship programme. One day, the first-year student Radha was ragged and slapped by another Kannan. The police then arrested the wrong "Kannan" and beat him up in the police lockup. When Radha and her father Rajasekhar went to the police station, Radha was embarrassed to see an innocent being punished. They apologize for the mistake, and he befriended Radha. Afterwards, Kannan fell in love with Radha and met Rohit, who worked in Rajasekhar's company.

During a press meet planned in a hurry, Ambalavanan claims that the newspaper is trying to tarnish his reputation and the accusations were baseless, and challenges "Kudiyarasu" to prove them with strong evidence. Ambalavanan then learns that Kannan was the journalist who wrote it, so he orders his henchmen to follow him and to take the evidence from him. Raghavan's granddaughter Arthi gives him the CD, but Ambalavanan's henchmen attack him at that moment, and they threaten Kannan to kill Arthi, Kannan has no other choice but to give them the CD. Kannan accidentally drops his diary, and Arthi starts reading it.

A few months ago, Kannan gave a sensational speech at a college function about journalism. Ram, the editor of "Kudiyarasu", impressed by his speech, hired Kannan as a part-time investigative journalist. Kannan then came across the closure of a finance company. Several poor and middle-class people had deposited their savings in a chit fund company, and the company looted investors of 2000 crores rupees. Kannan started to fully investigate after the suicide of his friend Priya (Tharika), who was scammed by the company. During the investigation, the auditor of the chit fund, Raghavan, accepted to give him the evidence and revealed that Ambalavanan was behind the chit fund scam.

Arthi decides to help Kannan, and they start looking for another evidence, but the powerful politician Ambalavanan sabotages all their plans. In a face-to-face confrontation with Kannan, Ambalavanan, with his henchmen, asks him to forget the matter, and he confesses that he has cheated many people via chit fund companies, however, Kannan records his confession without him knowing. Thereafter, the Chief Minister (John Amirtharaj) forces Ambalavanan to resign from his position as minister, and the news was published in a timely fashion. During a function, later that evening, Kannan and Arthi received praise from the Chief Minister for the brave act in front of the newly married couple Radha and Rohit. Subsequently, Kannan and Arthi fall in love with each other.

== Cast ==
- Vignesh as Kannan
- Sabarna as Radha
- Neepa as Arthi
- K. Suresh Kannan as Rohit
- E. S. Satya Narayana as Muthu
- Nizhalgal Ravi as Rajasekar
- Sethu Vinayagam as Ambalavanan
- V. S. Raghavan as Raghavan
- Srikanth as Ram
- John Amirtharaj as Chief Minister
- Nellai Siva
- Pandu as Saamy
- Anu Mohan
- Bayilvan Ranganathan
- Arulmani as Dhayalan
- Shankar
- Lollu Sabha Balaji as Balaji
- Tharika as Priya
- Meera Krishnan as Kannan's mother
- Risha in a special appearance
- Radhakrishnan
- Sabir Hussain as Marwan

== Production ==
The film director Shabir Hussain, a national kickboxing champion, said, "The Watergate scandal where two journalists exposed the then US president Richard Nixon is the inspiration for my story. The film proves the pen is mightier than the sword". Actor Vignesh has changed his name to Vigneshwaran for the film and will play the role of an investigative journalist who exposes corruption in society. Sabarna Anand, Sun Music video jockey turned heroine first time with this film. The rest of the cast includes Neepa, K. Suresh Kannan, Nizhalgal Ravi, Sethu Vinayakam, among others. Karthik Raja scores the music and the film was produced by two kickboxers K. Suresh Kannan and E. S. Satya Narayana.

== Soundtrack ==
Kudiyarasu

Soundtrack album by Karthik Raja
- Released: 2009
- Recorded: 2009
- Genre: Feature film soundtrack
- Length: 12:45
- Producer: Karthik Raja

Karthik Raja chronology
| Achamundu Achamundu (2009) | Kudiyarasu (2009) | Zamana (2010) |

The film score and the soundtrack were composed by Karthik Raja. The soundtrack, released in 2009, features 3 tracks with lyrics written by Andal Priyadarshini.

| Track | Song | Singer(s) | Duration |
|---|---|---|---|
| 1 | "Ayndharai Adiyil" | Malgudi Subha, Sunitha Sarathy | 3:58 |
| 2 | "Idhu Enna Idhu" | Karthik Raja, Bela Shende | 4:28 |
| 3 | "Idhu Enna Idhu" | Bela Shende, Karthik Raja | 4:19 |

== Release ==
The film was released on 13 February 2009 alongside Perumal and Siva Manasula Sakthi.

=== Critical reception ===
S. R. Ashok Kumar of The Hindu wrote, "With most of the cast and the director, H. M. Sabir Hussain, making their debut, one would expect the filmmaker to pay extra attention to the script which he has not done".
