= Vignesh (actor) =

Indian actor (born 1971)

- Born: Raja; 9 April 1971 (age 55); Erode, Tamil Nadu, India
- Occupations: Actor, businessman
- Years active: 1988–present
- Spouse: Uma Maheshwari
- Children: 2

Raja (born 9 April 1971), known professionally as Vignesh, is an Indian actor who predominantly works in Tamil cinema.

== Career ==
Vignesh was selected to play the debut lead role in Balu Mahendra's Vanna Vanna Pookkal (1992), but he was removed from the film after working on it for seven days and was replaced by Prashanth. He made his acting debut in 1992 with the village drama film Chinna Thayee. In 1993, he acted in Amma Ponnu, Bharathiraja's Kizhakku Cheemayile and Kathir's Uzhavan. In 1995, Vignesh appeared in six films. He starred in Chellakannu, which told the tragic story of a young couple caught between feuding families, and the film performed well and ran for over one hundred days at the box office. The film had featured him alongside actress Yuvarani, as did Pasumpon, while Nadodi Mannan became a box office failure.

In the mid of 1990s, Vignesh's housemate Bala, an erstwhile assistant of Balu Mahendra wrote the script of the film Sethu, then titled Akhilan, and offered him the film's lead role. The film was shelved due to financial constraints. In 1997, director Bala restarted the project and Vignesh, who was busy with other commitments, was replaced by Vikram. In 1998, Vignesh played the lead role in J. Suresh's Velai and played a cheat in Ravichandran's Kannedhirey Thondrinal. The following years, Vignesh played the lead role in low-budget films Pudhu Kudithanam (1999) and Nee Enthan Vaanam (2000), and played supporting roles in Suyamvaram (1999) and Appu (2000).

After a hiatus of 3 years, Vignesh made a comeback with Soori (2003). For Soori, Vignesh had to tonsure his head for 70 times. His performance received mixed reviews with critics claiming that Vignesh "tends to go slightly overboard, especially when he howls aloud in agony" and "his cries seem over the top". 2003 saw the release of his long-delayed films Ennai Thalatta Varuvala and Vani Mahal. The three films went unnoticed at box office, post-release Vignesh signed two projects titled "Ilango" and "Parithi" with both failing to proceed after launch. In 2005, Vignesh appeared in two low-budget films: Ulla Kadathal and Aadhikkam. Vignesh then produced and acted in the gangster film Aacharya (2006) and a critic stated, "for Vignesh, it is a comeback vehicle and he has done his best". He later starred as a leading actor such as Malarinum Melliya (2008), Kudiyarasu (2009) and Eesa (2009). He co-starring with Sathyaraj in Gowravargal (2010).

In 2020, he appeared in the serial with Poove Unakkaga broadcast by Sun TV. In 2021, he was seen integral role in the film Anandham Vilayadum Veedu and the serial Vaidhegi Kaathirundhaal. In 2022, the film Paasakaara Paya was released. In 2023, he was cast in Chandramukhi 2 directed by P. Vasu.

== Filmography ==
- All films are in Tamil, unless otherwise noted.

Year	Film	Role	Notes
1992	Chinna Thayee	Ponrasu	
1992	Annai Vayal	Sathyam's brother	
1993	Amma Ponnu	Anand	
1993	Kizhakku Cheemayile	Seenu	
1993	Uzhavan	Sundaram's brother	
1995	Manathile Oru Paattu	Anand	
1995	Muthukulikka Vaariyala	Chellappa	
1995	Pasumpon	Raasa	
1995	Chellakannu	Chellakannu	
1995	Nadodi Mannan	Ramesh	
1995	Mannukku Mariyadhai	Pandian	
1995	Chithirai Thiruvizha	Selvaa	
1996	Take It Easy Urvashi	Subramani	
1996	Naalamkettile Nalla Thampimar	Robert	Malayalam film
1996	Vetri Mugam	Aravind	
1997	Pongalo Pongal	Subramani	
1997	Kaadhali	Gopal	
1997	Kadhal Palli	Balu	
1997	Raman Abdullah	Raman	
1998	Velai	Ganesh	
1998	Kannedhirey Thondrinal	Sakthi	
1999	Suyamvaram	Potential groom	
1999	Pudhu Kudithanam	Ashok	
2000	Appu	Mano	
2000	Nee Enthan Vaanam	Sathya	
2000	Ninaivellam Nee	Karthik	
2003	Ennai Thalatta Varuvala	Santhosh	
2003	Soori	Suriya	
2003	Vani Mahal	Arul	
2005	Ulla Kadathal	Sakthi	
2005	Aadhikkam	Guru	
2006	Aacharya	Yadhunandhan (Saamy)	Also producer
2008	Malarinum Melliya	Elango	
2009	Kudiyarasu	Kannan	
2009	Eesa	Eesa	
2010	Gowravargal	Ganesan	
2013	Bhuvanakkadu	Mani Bharathi	
2016	Avan Aval	Venkatakrishnan	Also producer
2018	Aaruthra	Nambi	
2021	Anandham Vilayadum Veedu	Pazhanisamy	
2022	Paasakaara Paya	Guna	
2023	Chandramukhi 2	Ranganayagi's brother	
2024	Light House		
2025	Red Flower	Vicky and Michael	

=== Television ===
Year	Title	Role	Channel
2011	Appanum Aathalum		Kalaignar TV
2020–2021	Poove Unakkaga	Sakthivel	Sun TV
2020	Roja	Sakthivel	Sun TV
2021	Velammal	Raja Raghupathi	Star Vijay
2021–2022	Vaidhegi Kaathirundhaal	Rajarathinam	Star Vijay
2022	Sathya 2	Special Appearance	Zee Tamil
2022–2023	Vidhya No.1	Mayandi	Zee Tamil
2023–2024	Meena	Chidambaram	Sun TV
2024	Sandhya Raagam	Father Anthony	Zee Tamil
2026	Kanaa Kandenadi	Uthaman	Star Vijay
