= Kaadhali (1997 film) =

1997 Indian Tamil film directed by Siddhu

- Poster
- Directed by: Siddhu
- Written by: Siddhu
- Produced by: Dharamchandh Lungath
- Starring: Vignesh; Devayani; Karan
- Cinematography: G. Gopi Krishna
- Music by: Deva
- Production company: Tara Creations
- Release date: 25 July 1997
- Running time: 150 minutes
- Country: India
- Language: Tamil

Kaadhali (transl. Lover Girl) is a 1997 Indian Tamil-language romance film directed by Siddhu. The film stars Vignesh, Devayani, Karan and Divya. It was released on 25 July 1997.

== Cast ==
- Vignesh as Gopal
- Devayani as Deivanai
- Divya Jaiswal as Stella
- Karan
- Vadivelu
- Jayachitra
- Kavitha
- Dr. Sharmila as Interviewer
- Vennira Aadai Moorthy
- Kovai Senthil
- R. Sundarrajan
- Kullamani
- Vinu Chakravarthy
- Chinni Jayanth
- King Kong

== Production ==
The film marked the debut of director Siddhu, who chose to cast Vignesh and Devayani in the film's lead roles. Likewise Hindi actress Divya, previously seen in the Hindi film Loha (1997), made her debut in Tamil films with the project.

== Soundtrack ==
The music was composed by Deva, with lyrics written by Ponniyin Selvan, Kalidasan and Palani Bharathi.

Song	Singer(s)	Lyrics	Duration
"Mumbai Kaatre"	Mano, Anuradha Sriram	Kalidasan	5:28
"O Nenjea"	Anuradha Sriram, P. Unnikrishnan	Palani Bharathi	5:17
"O Nenjea"	P. Unnikrishnan	Palani Bharathi	4:31
"Connemera"	Deva	Ponniyin Selvan	5:36
"Dikki Dikki"	A. L. Raghavan, Malaysia Vasudevan, B. S. Sasirekha, T. K. Kala, Kovai Kamala	Kalidasan	4:42
"Yei Chittukuruvi"	Sujatha, Kovai Kamala	Kalidasan	4:47
