= List of Tamil films of 2013 =

This is a list of Tamil language films produced in the Tamil cinema in India that were released in 2013.

Post-amendment to the Tamil Nadu Entertainment Tax Act 1939 on 27 September 2011, gross jumped to 130 per cent of net for films with non-Tamil titles and U certificates as well. Commercial Taxes Department disclosed ₹68 crore in entertainment tax revenue for the year.

== Box office collection ==
Rank	Film	Worldwide gross
1	Vishwaroopam	₹200 crore
2	Singam 2	₹146 crore
3	Arrambam	₹110 crore
4	Thalaivaa	₹90 crore
5	Raja Rani	₹52 crore

== Released films ==
=== January – March ===
Opening		Title	Director	Cast	Genre	Notes	Ref
J A N	4	Kalla Thuppakki	Logiyas	Kutty Anand, Sampath Ram, Viccy, Prabhakaran, Sravanthika	Comedy	Produced by Thithir Film	
J A N	4	Kanavu Kadhalan	Thiruna Annan	Udhay, Saritha Yadav, Meera Krishnan	Romance	Produced by Dream Merchant Films	
J A N	4	Kurumbukara Pasanga	T. Samydurai	Sanjeev, Monica, Manobala, Pandiarajan	Drama	Produced by Sri Periyayi Pictures	
J A N	4	Mayil Paarai	P. Siva Kumar	Arasa Kumaran, Devika Nambiar	Romance	Produced by Om Shree Lakshmi Films	
J A N	4	Nanbargal Gavanathirkku	K. Jayakumar	Sanjeev, Manishajith, Varshan	Drama	Produced by Green Channel Entertainment	
J A N	4	Nimidangal	Geetha Krishna	Shashank, Priyanka, Suman, Atul Kulkarni	Crime	Produced by Blue Fox Cinema	
J A N	11	Alex Pandian	Suraj	Karthi, Anushka Shetty, Santhanam, Nikita Thukral, Milind Soman, Suman	Action	Produced by Studio Green	
J A N	13	Kanna Laddu Thinna Aasaiya	K. S. Manikandan	Santhanam, Srinivasan, Sethu, Vishakha Singh	Comedy	Produced by Hand Made Films & Sri Thenandal Films	
J A N	13	Samar	Thiru	Vishal, Trisha Krishnan, Sunaina	Action	Produced by Balaji Real Media	
J A N	14	Puthagam	Vijay Adhiraj	Sathya, Jagapati Babu, Rakul Preet Singh, Sanjay Bharathi, Rachana Maurya	Drama	Produced by Ram Pictures Private Limited	
J A N	14	Vijayanagaram	Tanveer	Sivan, Hasini, Bhanu Chander, Aryan	Drama	Produced by SMK	
J A N	25	Kadhal Kilukiluppu	S. Kasi	Kabileshwar, Murugan Mandhiram, A. M. Abdulha	Romance	Produced by Hitech Movie	
J A N	25	Pathayeram Kodi	Srinivasan Sundar	Dhruv Bhandari, Madalasa Sharma, Vivek, Kanishka Soni	Comedy	Produced by Maya Creations	
F E B	1	Kadal	Mani Ratnam	Gautham Karthik, Thulasi Nair, Arvind Swamy, Arjun, Lakshmi Manchu	Drama	Produced by Madras Talkies	
F E B	1	David	Bejoy Nambiar	Vikram, Jiiva, Tabu, Isha Sharvani, Lara Dutta	Drama	Produced by Reliance MediaWorks	
F E B	7	Vishwaroopam	Kamal Haasan	Kamal Haasan, Pooja Kumar, Rahul Bose, Andrea Jeremiah	Spy thriller	Produced by Rajkamal International; Released worldwide on 25 January 2013	
F E B	14	Nesam Nesapaduthe	Rajasuriyan	Vendhan, Arasi, Ragava	Romance		
F E B	14	Sillunu Oru Sandhippu	Ravi Lallin	Vimal, Dipa Shah, Oviya	Romance	Produced by Madras Enterprises	
F E B	22	Ameerin Aadhi-Bhagavan	Ameer Sultan	Jayam Ravi, Neetu Chandra, Sudha Chandran	Action	Produced by Anbu Pictures	
F E B	22	Ariyathavan Puriyathavan	J. K.	J. K., Unnimaya	Drama	Produced by JK Productions	
F E B	22	Haridas	G. N. R. Kumaravelan	Kishore, Sneha, Prithviraj Das	Drama	Produced by DR V RAM Production Private Limited	
F E B	22	Paatti	Ramesh	Ranganayaki, Nagina, Mahalakshmi, Baby Nandhini, Naveen Rajan	Drama	Produced by Sureshkumar	
M A R	1	Aandava Perumal	Sathish Kumar	Sivan, Sasi, Idhaya, Jeeva	Romance	Produced by R. Jana	
M A R	1	Chuda Chuda	Idhayan	Idhayan, Sri Iraa, Leema, Shobina, Durga	Romance	Produced by Yazhine Creations	
M A R	1	Chandhamama	Radhakrishnan	Karunas, Shweta Basu Prasad, Harish Kalyan	Comedy	Produced by Classic Cinemas	
M A R	1	Lollu Dhadha Parak Parak	K. Viyasan	Mansoor Ali Khan, Shilpha	Comedy	Produced by Vijayamuralee	
M A R	1	Vellachi	Velu Viswanath	Pintu, Suchitra Unni, Ganja Karuppu	Romance	Produced by K. Ananthan	
M A R	8	Mathil Mel Poonai	Barani Jayapal	Vijay Vasanth, Vibha Natarajan	Thriller	Produced by Peenics Creations	
M A R	8	Onbadhule Guru	P. T. Selvakumar	Vinay Rai, Aravind Akash, Premgi Amaren, Lakshmi Rai	Comedy	Produced by Cosmo and Boss Film Company	
M A R	8	Pesamal Pesinaal	Sivamanoharan	Santhosh, Gayathri, Nizhalgal Ravi	Romance	Produced by Rainbow Productions	
M A R	8	Sundaattam	Brahma G. Dev	Irfan, Arundhathi, Madhu	Romance	Produced by Film Fame Production	
M A R	15	Garuda Paarvai	Vivehanandan	Vivehanandan, Puja Vijayan, Ramamurthi Yadav, Sheela, Gandhi, Ravi	Drama		
M A R	15	Karumpuli	Parameshwar	Mahesh, Rathan Mouli, Varsha Pandey, Prachee Adhikari, Soorya Kiran, Arul Azhagan		Produced by Madras Film Academy(MFA)	
M A R	15	Paradesi	Bala	Adharvaa, Vedhicka, Dhansika	Drama	Produced by B Studios	
M A R	15	Vathikuchi	H.nowfal riswan	Dhileban, Anjali, Jayaprakash, Sampath Raj	Thriller	Produced by Murugadoss Productions & Fox Star Studios	
M A R	22	Kan Pesum Vaarthaigal	R. Balaji	Mirchi Senthil, Iniya	Romance	Produced by Balaji Cine Creations	
M A R	22	Kantha	Babu Vishwanath	Karan, Mithra Kurian	Action	Produced by VP Films	
M A R	22	Karuppampatti	Tha. Prabhu Raja Cholan	Ajmal Ameer, Aparnaa Bajpai, Alice Tantardini	Drama	Produced by Sundar Pictures	
M A R	22	Naanum En Jamunavum	Guruaja-Jayatamil	Jayant, Poulami	Adult romance	Produced by Gururaja International	
M A R	29	Azhagan Azhagi	Nandha Periyasaamy	Jack, Aarushi, A. Venkatesh	Drama		
M A R	29	Chennaiyil Oru Naal	Shaheed Kader	Sarathkumar, Cheran, Prakash Raj, Prasanna, Radhika, Iniya, Parvathi Menon	Drama-thriller	Produced by I Pictures & Magic Frames	
M A R	29	February 31	S.S. Prem Kumar	Sriram, Niranjana	Thriller		
M A R	29	Kedi Billa Killadi Ranga	Pandiraj	Sivakarthikeyan, Vimal, Bindu Madhavi, Regina Cassandra	Comedy	Produced by Pasanga Productions & Escape Artists Motion Pictures	
M A R	29	Keeripulla	Firose Khan	Yuvan, Disha Pandey, Ganja Karuppu	Drama	Produced by Angels Film International	

=== April – June ===
Opening		Title	Director	Cast	Genre	Notes	Ref
A P R	5	4	Bhagavathi Bala	Balladic, Chakravarthi			
A P R	5	Settai	R. Kannan	Arya, Anjali, Hansika Motwani, Santhanam, Premgi Amaren	Comedy	Produced by UTV Motion Pictures	
A P R	5	Vetkathai Kettal Enna Tharuvai	Thabu Sankar	Ashok, Kiruthika	Romance	Produced by Silver Jubilee Movies	
A P R	12	Maruvisaranai	Vijayagopal	V. S. Vijayagopal, Vishnu Priya	Action	Produced by Senthil Andavar Cinemas	
A P R	12	Maiyam Konden	K. Arjunaraja	Dilip Kumar Salvadi, Shobana Nayudu, Ganja Karuppu	Romance		
A P R	12	Ninaivugal Azhivathillai	Bhagatsingh Kannan	Arun, Gayathri	Drama	Produced by Agni Kalaikoodam	
A P R	12	Maman Machan	M. Jeyraj	Vijay Thirumoolam	Comedy		
A P R	12	Unaku 20 Enaku 40	KPS Akshay	Singam Puli, Vaiyapuri, Vadivukkarasi, Karishma	Comedy	Produced by Sri Bannariamman Productions	
A P R	19	Gouravam	Radha Mohan	Allu Sirish, Yami Gautam, Prakash Raj	Drama	Produced by Duet Movies	
A P R	19	Iru Killadigal	Mark Landsman	Byass, Swathi, Vennira Aadai Moorthy			
A P R	19	Thirumathi Thamizh	Rajakumaran	Rajakumaran, Keerthi Chawla, Devayani	Drama	Produced by Ra Dhe Creations	
A P R	19	Udhayam NH4	Manikandan	Siddharth, Ashrita Shetty, Kishore	Romantic thriller	Produced by Meeka Entertainment & Grass Root Film Company	
A P R	26	Naan Rajavaga Pogiren	Prithvi Rajkumar	Nakul, Chandini, Avani Modi	Action	Produced by Udhayam VLS Cine Media	
A P R	26	Oruvar Meethu Iruvar Sainthu	Balasekaran	Laguparan, Swathi, Sanyathara	Romance	Produced by Edriya Tech Films	
A P R	26	Yaaruda Mahesh	R. Madhan Kumar	Sundeep Kishan, Dimple Chopade	Adult comedy	Produced by Colour Frames Red Studios	
M A Y	1	Ethir Neechal	Durai Senthil Kumar	Sivakarthikeyan, Priya Anand	Comedy drama	Produced by Wunderbar Films	
M A Y	1	Moondru Per Moondru Kadal	Vasanth	Arjun, Cheran, Vimal, Muktha Bhanu, Surveen Chawla, Lasika	Romance	Produced by Mahendra Talkies	
M A Y	1	Soodhu Kavvum	Nalan Kumarasamy	Vijay Sethupathi, Sanchita Shetty, Bobby Simha, Ashok Selvan, Ramesh Thilak, Karunakaran	Comedy-thriller	Produced by Thirukumaran Entertainment	
M A Y	10	Nagaraja Cholan MA, MLA	Manivannan	Sathyaraj, Manivannan, Seeman, Mrudula Murali, Komal Sharma, Varsha Ashwathi	Political satire	Produced by V House Production	
M A Y	17	Neram	Alphonse Putharen	Nivin Pauly, Nazriya Nazim, Bobby Simha, Nassar, Thambi Ramaiah	Comedy-thriller	Produced by Winner Bulls Films	
M A Y	24	Masani	Padmaraj & LGR	Akhil, Iniya, Sija Rose, Ramki	Action thriller	Produced by Sree Kiran Productions	
M A Y	24	Galapetti					
M A Y	24	Sokkali	A Charan	Chaithanya, Swasika, Sona Heiden, Ganja Karuppu	Drama		
M A Y	30	Kutti Puli	Muthaiah	M. Sasikumar, Lakshmi Menon, Saranya Ponvannan	Drama	Produced by Village Theaters	
M A Y	31	Isakki	M. Ganeshan	Sharran Kumar, Aashritha	Drama		
M A Y	31	Kandathum Kadhal Antharangam	J. V. Ruckmangdhan	Ramu, Kamalika	Drama		
J U N	7	Yamuna	E. V. Ganeshbabu	Sathya, Sri Ramya	Drama-thriller	Produced by Sri HariBalaji Movies	
J U N	7	Solla Matten	N. P. Ismail	Sakthi Chidambaram, Jesmy	Romance-thriller		
J U N	14	Theeya Velai Seiyyanum Kumaru	Sundar C	Siddharth, Hansika Motwani, Santhanam, Ganesh Venkatraman	Romantic comedy	Produced by UTV Motion Pictures and Avni Cinemax	
J U N	14	Thillu Mullu	Badri	Shiva, Isha Talwar, Prakash Raj	Comedy	Produced by Vendhar Movies	
J U N	21	Thee Kulikkum Pachai Maram	Vineesh-Prabheesh	Prajin, Sarayu, Sasha, M. S. Bhaskar	Drama		
J U N	28	Annakodi	Bharathiraja	Lakshman Narayan, Karthika Nair, Manoj Bharathiraja	Drama	Produced by Manoj Creations	
J U N	28	Thulli Vilayadu	Vincent Selva	Yuvaraj, Prakash Raj, Deepthi Nambiar	Comedy-thriller	Produced by RB Studios	

=== July – September ===
Opening		Title	Director	Cast	Genre	Notes	Ref
J U L	5	Singam II	Hari	Suriya, Anushka Shetty, Hansika Motwani, Rahman, Danny Sapani	Action-masala	Produced by Prince Pictures	
J U L	12	Anba Azhaga	S. Sivaraman	Akashprabhu, Preethi Sankar, Lavanya	Romance		
J U L	12	Kaadhale Ennai Kaadhali	Iam Shan	Santhosh, Anara Atanes	Romance		
J U L	12	Sathiram Perundhu Nilayam	Ravipriyan	Roshan, Twinkle	Drama		
J U L	19	Maryan	Bharat Bala	Dhanush, Parvathy Thiruvothu	Drama		
J U L	26	Pattathu Yaanai	Boopathy Pandian	Vishal, Aishwarya Arjun, Santhanam	Action masala		
J U L	26	Sonna Puriyathu	Krishnan Jayaraj	Shiva, Vasundhara Kashyap	Comedy		
A U G	2	Nenju Irukkum Varai Ninaivu Irukkum	S. O. Nabidaas	Ishaq Hussaini, Shilpa, Visu, Vaiyapuri	Drama		
A U G	2	Pullukatu Muthamma	C. R. Muthupandi	Meenu Kurian	Adult romance		
A U G	10	Ainthu Ainthu Ainthu	Sasi	Bharath, Mrithika, Erica Fernandes, Santhanam	Action thriller		
A U G	15	Aadhalal Kadhal Seiveer	Suseenthiran	Santhosh, Manisha Yadav	Romance		
A U G	20	Thalaivaa	A. L. Vijay	Vijay, Sathyaraj, Amala Paul, Santhanam, Abhimanyu Singh, Rajiv Pillai	Action thriller	Produced by Mishri Enterprises; Released worldwide on 9 August 2013	
A U G	23	Desingu Raja	Ezhil	Vimal, Bindu Madhavi	Romance	Produced by Olympia Movies	
A U G	30	Ponmaalai Pozhudhu	AC Durai	Aadhav Kannadasan, Gayathrie	Romance	Produced by AG Creations	
A U G	30	Summa Nachunu Irukku	A. Venkatesh	Thaman Kumar, Vibha Natarajan, Archana Vishwanath, Thambi Ramaiah, Sreenivasan	Comedy	Produced by Esthell Entertainers	
A U G	30	Suvadugal	Jay Bala	Jay Bala, Monica, K. R. Vijaya			
A U G	30	Thanga Meenkal	Ram	Ram, Sadhana, Shelly Kishore	Drama	Produced by Photon Kathaas	
A U G	30	Thiru Pugazh	Arjunaraja	Dilip Kumar Salvadi, Divya Singh, Prabhuraj	Drama	Produced by Real Screen	
S E P	6	Varuthapadatha Valibar Sangam	Ponnraam	Sivakarthikeyan, Sri Divya, Sathyaraj, Soori	Comedy	Produced by Escape Artist Motion Pictures	
S E P	7	Arya Surya	Rama Narayanan	Srinivasan, Vishnupriyan, Nakshathra	Comedy	Produced by Sri Thenandal films	
S E P	13	Mathapoo	Dhinanthorum Nagaraj	Jeyan, Gayathrie	Romance		
S E P	13	Moodar Koodam	Naveen	Sentrayan, Naveen, Rajaj, Oviya	Black comedy		
S E P	13	Unnodu Oru Naal	Durai Karthikeyan	Arjun Vijayaraghavan, Neelam Upadhyay, Gibran Osman	Romantic thriller	Produced by Jarci Production	
S E P	20	6	V. Z. Durai	Shaam, Poonam Kaur	Thriller		
S E P	20	Adutha Kattam	Murali Krishnan	Ganthiban, Malar Meni Perumal, Aghonderan Sahadevan, Shashitaran Rajoo, D. Rajam	Suspense thriller	Produced by Navanithen Ganeson, NGP Film Sdn Bhd	
S E P	20	Mouna Mazhai	Anand	Sasi, Manisha Jith, Dilip	Romance	Produced by Prince Media	
S E P	20	Ya Ya	I Rajasekaran	Shiva, Santhanam, Dhansika, Sandhya	Comedy	Produced by Sri Lakshmi Productions	
S E P	27	Onaayum Aattukkuttiyum	Mysskin	Mysskin, Sri	Thriller	Produced by Lone Wolf Productions	
S E P	27	Raja Rani	Atlee Kumar	Arya, Nayantara, Jai, Nazriya Nazim	Romantic drama	Produced by Murugadoss Productions and Fox Star Studios	

=== October – December ===
Opening		Title	Director	Cast	Genre	Notes	Ref
O C T	2	Idharkuthane Aasaipattai Balakumara	Gokul	Vijay Sethupathi, Ashwin Kakumanu, Swati Reddy, Nandita Swetha	Comedy	Produced by Leo Vision and JSK Film Corporation	
O C T	4	Nila Meedhu Kadhal	Ilayakumar	Vijayaraj, Joshwa, Sri Priyanga, Sudha	Romance	Produced by Rajaram Movies	
O C T	11	Kayavan	Venky	Mithun	Romance		
O C T	11	Naiyaandi	A. Sarkunam	Dhanush, Nazriya Nazim	Comedy		
O C T	11	Vanakkam Chennai	Kiruthika Udhaynidhi	Shiva, Priya Anand	Comedy		
O C T	18	Anjal Thurai	A. R. Rafi	Mohan. C, Narayanan, Kushi, Senthil	Horror / thriller	Produced by Latha Cine Creations	
O C T	18	Chithirayil Nilachoru	R. Sundarrajan	Sara Arjun, Ashok Sundarrajan, Vasundhara Kashyap, Prakash Nath	Drama		
O C T	18	Ninaivugal Unnodu	T. Mahesh Babu	T. Mahesh Babu	Romance		
O C T	18	Nirnayam	S. S. Srisaravanan	Vikram Anand, Regina Cassandra, Baby Vedhika	Drama		
O C T	18	Nugam	Jeffy	Jeybala, Iniya, Suresh, Reeshkadir, Preethi	Drama		
O C T	18	Ragalaipuram	Mano	Karunas, Angana Roy, Sanjana Singh	Comedy		
O C T	25	Ingu Kadhal Katrutharapadum	M. Sreedharan	Sreenath, Darshana, Archana	Romance		
O C T	25	Muthu Nagaram	Ottapidaram K. Thirupathi	Vishvaa, Asrik Bhanu	Romance		
O C T	25	Naankam Thamizhan	Ongaramourtty	Vijay Chandhar, Chandru, Mona	Suspense		
O C T	25	Sutta Kadhai	Subu	Balaji, Venkat, Nassar, Lakshmi Priyaa Chandramouli	Black comedy		
O C T	25	Vasanthasena	Raman	Ravi Prakash, Priyanka Tiwari	Romance		
O C T	31	Arrambam	Vishnuvardhan	Ajith Kumar, Arya, Nayantara, Taapsee Pannu	Action thriller	Produced by Sri Satya Sai Movies	
N O V	2	All in All Azhagu Raja	M. Rajesh	Karthi, Kajal Aggarwal, Santhanam	Comedy		
N O V	2	Pandiya Naadu	Suseenthiran	Vishal, Lakshmi Menon, Vikranth	Action drama		
N O V	14	Apple Penne	R. K. Kalaimani	Vatsan, Aishwarya Menon, Roja,	Drama		
N O V	14	Pizza II: Villa	Deepan Chakravarthy	Ashok Selvan, Sanchita Shetty, Nassar, Vegan Rajesh	Fantasy thriller		
N O V	14	Ravana Desam	Ajay Nuthakki	Ajay Nuthakki, Jennifer, Naveen, Konda, Ramkiran	War drama		
N O V	22	Irandaam Ulagam	Selvaraghavan	Arya, Anushka Shetty	Fantasy		
N O V	22	Maayai	Lakshmiram	Sanjay, Sanam Shetty, Rajendran	Thriller		
N O V	22	Meiyyazhagi	R. T. Jayavel	Balaji Balakrishnan, Jai Quehaeni, Arjun, Arunmozhi Varman, Jenny Jasmine	Drama		
N O V	29	Appavukku Kalyanam	Armugha Swamy	Padiyan, Rasikapriya	Adult comedy		
N O V	29	Ennachu	Sri Mani	Mohammed Ismail, Vivinth, Jagan Balaji	Thriller		
N O V	29	Jannal Oram	Karu Pazhaniappan	Parthiban, Vimal, Vidharth, Poorna, Manisha Yadav	Comedy drama		
N O V	29	Naveena Saraswathi Sabatham	K. Chandru	Jai, Niveda Thomas	Fantasy comedy		
N O V	29	Vidiyum Munn	Balaji K. Kumar	Pooja Umashankar, Malavika Manikuttan, Vinod Kishan	Thriller		
D E C	6	Ego	S. Sakthivel	Velu, Anaswara Kumar, Bala	Comedy		
D E C	6	Kalyana Samayal Saadham	RS Prasanna	Prasanna, Lekha Washington	Romantic comedy		
D E C	6	Thagaraaru	Ganesh Vinayak	Arulnidhi, Poorna	Action		
D E C	6	Vellai Desathin Idhayam	Jughein	Mithun Serai, Supra, Soori	Drama		
D E C	13	Ivan Veramathiri	M. Saravanan	Vikram Prabhu, Surabhi, Ganesh Venkatraman, Vamsi Krishna	Thriller		
D E C	13	Kolagalam	P.G. Surendran	Amal, Saranya Mohan, Vishnupriya	Drama		
D E C	13	Sandhithathum Sindhithathum	Balu Anand	Sathya, Yudasha, Kumarajan	Romance		
D E C	13	Thedi Pidi Adi	Aegan	Suresh	Thriller		
D E C	20	Biriyani	Venkat Prabhu	Karthi, Hansika Motwani, Premgi Amaren, Ramki	Comedy-thriller	Produced by Studio Green	
D E C	20	Endrendrum Punnagai	I. Ahmed	Jiiva, Trisha Krishnan, Vinay Rai, Andrea Jeremiah, Santhanam	Romance		
D E C	20	Thalaimuraigal	Balu Mahendra	Sashikumar, Vinodhini, Ramya Shankar, Balu Mahendra	Drama		
D E C	25	Madha Yaanai Koottam	Vikram Sugumaran	Kathir, Oviya	Thriller		
D E C	27	Bhuvanakadu	Mohan	Vignesh, Divya Nagesh	Romance		
D E C	27	Vizha	Bharathi Balakumaran	Mahendran, Malavika Menon	Romance	Produced by Sri Thenandal Films, Azure Entertainment, JV Media Dreams	

== Overseas Tamil language films ==
Below is the list of Tamil language movies produced outside India.

Title	Genre	Country	Ref
Pickles	Comedy	Singapore	

== Dubbed films ==
Opening	Title	Director(s)	Original film		Cast	Ref.
Opening	Title	Director(s)	Film	Language	Cast	Ref.
1 March	Naangam Pirai 3D	Vinayan	Dracula 2012	Malayalam	Sudheer Sukumaran, Prabhu, Thilakan, Monal Gajjar, Shraddha Das	
December	Achcham Thavir	Omkar	Genius	Telugu	Havish, Sarath Kumar, Sanusha	

== Awards ==
Category/organization	Filmfare Awards South 12 July 2014	SIIMA Awards 17 July 2014	Tamil Nadu State Film Awards 14 July 2017	Vijay Awards 5 July 2014
Best Film	Thanga Meenkal	Soodhu Kavvum	Ramanujan	Thanga Meenkal
Best Director	Bala; Paradesi	Bala; Paradesi	Ram; Thanga Meenkal	Bala; Paradesi
Best Actor	Atharvaa; Paradesi	Sivakarthikeyan; Ethir Neechal	Arya; Raja Rani	Kamal Haasan; Vishwaroopam
Best Actress	Nayanthara; Raja Rani	Trisha; Endrendrum Punnagai	Nayanthara; Raja Rani	Nayanthara; Raja Rani
Best Music Director	A. R. Rahman; Kadal	Anirudh Ravichander; Ethir Neechal	Ramesh Vinayagam; Ramanujan	A. R. Rahman; Kadal

== Notable deaths ==
Month	Date	Name	Age	Profession	Notable films	References
January	17	Sophiya Haque	41	Actress	Alaipayuthey • Udhaya	
March	5	Rajasulochana	77	Actress	Thai Pirandhal Vazhi Pirakkum • Nallavan Vazhvan • Pennarasi • Kavalai Illaadha Manithan	
March	7	Venky Sambamoorthy		Graphics expert	Apoorva Sagodharargal • Anjali • Kaadhalan • Indian • Jeans • Manmadhan	
March	26	Sukumari	74	Actress	Alaipayuthey • Pattikada Pattanama • Sila Nerangalil Sila Manithargal • Veerapandiya Kattabomman	
April	14	P. B. Sreenivas	82	Singer	Pasamalar • Pava Mannippu • Veera Thirumagan • Kaadhalikka Neramillai	
April	17	T. K. Ramamoorthy	91	Music director	Pasamalar • Kaadhalikka Neramillai • Karnan • Padagotti • Aayirathil Oruvan	
April	22	Lalgudi Jayaraman	82	Music director	Sringaram	
May	25	T. M. Soundararajan	91	Singer	Andavan Kattalai • Padagotti	
June	15	Manivannan	58	Director, actor	Gopurangal Saivathillai • Amaithipadai • Ullathai Allitha • Mudhalvan • Nagaraja Cholan MA, MLA	
July	7	Santo Krishnan (Krishnan Nair)	92	Actor	Mahaveera Bheeman • Thalaivar	
July	8	Agasthiya Bharathi	48	Director	Ninaivil Nindraval	
July	9	Rasu Madhuravan	44	Director	Poomagal Oorvalam • Pandi • Mayandi Kudumbathar • Goripalayam • Muthukku Muthaaga • Pandi Oli Perukki Nilayam	
July	12	M. Bhaskar	78	Director	Bairavi • Theerpugal Dandikkapadalaam • Pournami Alaigal • Chakravarthy	
July	13	Akkineni Ravi Shankar Prasad	58	Producer	Vasool Raja MBBS • Nanban • Madha Gaja Raja	
July	15	M. K. Athmanathan	88	Lyricist, music director	Pudhaiyal • Nallavan Vazhvan • Nadodi Mannan • Vikramaadhithan • Malliga • Vijayapuri Veeran • Tenali Raman • Thirudadhe • Malliya Mangalam • Naalu Veli Nilam• Rattha Paasam	
July	18	Vaali	81	Lyricist, actor, writer	Karpagam • Anbe Vaa • Enga Veettu Pillai • Punnagai Mannan • Agni Natchathiram • Boys • Ethir Neechal • Paarthale Paravasam • Sivaji • Mankatha• Maryan •	
July	23	Manjula Vijayakumar	59	Actress	Shanti Nilayam • Rickshawkaran • Ulagam Sutrum Valiban • Netru Indru Naalai • Anbe Aaruyire • Cheran Pandiyan	
August	19	Periyar Dasan	63	Actor	Karuththamma • Kadhalar Dhinam • Tamizh Padam • Veeram	
October	9	Srihari	49	Actor	Vettaikkaaran • Markandeyan	
November	8	Chitti Babu	49	Actor	Five Star • Dhool • Sivakasi • Dindigul Sarathy	
November	17	Thideer Kannaiah	76	Actor	Aval Oru Thodar Kathai • Apoorva Raagangal • Kannaathaal • Pokkiri	
November	30	Raguram	64	Choreographer	Dasavathaaram	
December	11	Master Sridhar	60	Actor	Kandan Karunai • Karnan • Kurathi Magan	
December	20	Karumari Kandhasamy	73	Producer	Karagattakaran • Villu Pattukaran • Ellam Avan Seyal	
December	25	Kullamani	61	Actor	Nawab Naarkali • Billa • Karagattakaran • Thoranai	
