= Jump Jilani =

- Theatrical release poster
- Directed by: E. Sathibabu
- Story by: Sundar C
- Produced by: Ambica Krishna
- Starring: Allari Naresh; Isha Chawla; Swathi Deekshith
- Cinematography: Dasaradhi Sivendra
- Music by: Vijay Ebenezer
- Production companies: Venkateshwara Art Productions; Reliance Entertainment
- Release date: 12 June 2014
- Running time: 164 minutes
- Country: India
- Language: Telugu

Jump Jilani is a 2014 Indian Telugu-language comedy film directed by E. Sattibabu. The film stars Allari Naresh, Isha Chawla, and Swathi Deekshith in lead roles with Kota Srinivasa Rao and Posani Krishna Murali portraying supporting roles. It is a remake of the Tamil film Kalakalappu (2012). Naresh plays dual roles.

== Plot ==
Sathibabu runs the Nidadavolu-based Satyanarayana Vilas Coffee Club, inherited from his forefathers. It was a famous food outlet a few decades earlier, but has lost its prominence, and now Seenu finds it difficult to manage the struggling enterprise. The food joint's chef and his granddaughter Ganga stay with Sathibabu.

Madhavi, the new health inspector, decides to permanently shut down Satyanarayana Vilas Coffee Club due to its unhygienic environment. Sathibabu requests her to give him some time so he can make his hotel regain its prominence. Slowly, Sathibabu and Madhavi become good friends, and love blossoms between them.

Sathibabu's younger brother Rambabu, a thief, gets released from prison. Sathibabu allows Rambabu to stay with him as Rambabu saves him from the moneylender Dharmavaddi Dharmaraju, to whom Sathibabu owes money. Rambabu falls in love with Ganga at first sight. A jewellery owner seeks to get money from insurance. He sets fire to his jewellery showroom and tries to get the insured amount by claiming loss, although he has safely hidden precious diamonds in a mobile phone which is with his nephew Kumar. Kumar misplaces the mobile phone containing the diamonds, which later gets into Rambabu's hands.

Police Inspector Nagaraju, a cunning man, is a childhood friend of Sathibabu. A real estate developer plans to demolish Satyanarayana Vilas Coffee Club and construct a mall over there due to its prime location. But Sathibabu is unwilling to sell his property as he prefers to own it in the memory of his family members. Nagaraju assures to convince Sathibabu and make him sell the hotel and he talks a deal with the real estate developer.

Sathibabu, Rambabu, Madhavi, and Ganga come up with a plan to introduce traditional healthy food menu in Satyanarayana Vilas Coffee Club, believing that it will be liked by the present generation. Ganga's grandfather gives tips about healthy ingredients, and Satyanarayana Vilas Coffee Club becomes popular again due to differentiated menu. Sathibabu earns more money from Satyanarayana Vilas Coffee Club.

Meanwhile, Madhavi's wedding is fixed with her relative Ugra Narasimha Reddy in the village by her family. Sathibabu goes to Madhavi's village to stop the wedding and bring her back to Nidadavolu.

When Sathibabu is away, Nagaraju plans to grab Satyanarayana Vilas Coffee Club as it is now managed only by Rambabu, who is addicted to gambling. Nagaraju calls Rambabu for gambling, for which Rambabu accepts. Dharamarajan tricks Rambabu into gambling using his hotel documents. Rambabu loses the game, and Nagaraju takes over Satyanarayana Vilas Coffee Club. Sathibabu gets shocked knowing that Nagaraju has betrayed them.

After a series of events, Ugra Narasimha Reddy learns about Sathibabu and Madhavi's love and decides to let them marry.

The jewellery owner tracks down that the mobile phone containing diamonds is with Rambabu and comes to kill him and take back the diamonds. But Sathibabu and Rambabu get to know about the diamonds being hidden in the mobile phone only after the jewellery owner comes. Sathibabu and Rambabu escape from the jewellery owner. The jewellery owner kidnaps Ganga and Madhavi and threatens Sathibabu and Rambabu to give back the diamonds. A fight sequence follows where Sathibabu and Rambabu beat the jewellery owner. In the meantime, they also grab the hotel's documents from Nagaraju. The police restore the diamonds and arrest Nagaraju and the jewellery owner. Sathibabu unites with Madhavi and Rambabu with Ganga.

== Cast ==
- Allari Naresh as Sathibabu and Rambabu
- Swathi Deekshith as Ganga
- Isha Chawla as Madhavi
- Kota Srinivasa Rao as Venkatnarayana
- Posani Krishna Murali as Ugra Narasimha Reddy
- Raghu Babu as Dharmavaddi Dharmaraju aka Baadshah Babai
- M. S. Narayana as Madhavi's grandfather
- Bharath Raju as SI Nagaraju
- Rao Ramesh as the jewellery owner
- Venu Madhav as Constable Pichheswar Rao
- Dhanraj as Varam
- Jayaprakash Reddy as Veera Puli Reddy
- Thagubothu Ramesh as Ugra Narsimha Reddy's henchman
- Fish Venkat as Basava
- Geetha Singh as Shanti
- Duvvasi Mohan as Veera Puli Reddy's assistant
- Khayyum as the jewellery owner's assistant
- Jeeva as a doctor
- Hema as frustrated hotel customer
- Banerjee as potential land buyer
- Sana as Dharmavaddi Dharmaraju's wife
- Satyanarayana as Satyanarayana (in portrait)
- Gemini Ganesan as Sathibabu and Rambabu's forefather (in portrait)

== Soundtrack ==
The music was composed by Vijay Ebenezer, who reused two songs from the original film. "Rangu Rangu" and "Khana Khazaana" were reused from "Ivalunga Imsai" and "Mokka Manusha", respectively. For the audio launch, a hot air balloon was launched with the lead cast (Naresh, Deekshit, and Chawla) and Manchu Manoj aboard. The songs were released on 31 May 2014.

All lyrics are written by Ramajogayya Sastry.

Track listing
No.	Title	Singer(s)	Length
1.	"Lucky Laduki"	Tippu	4:09
2.	"Khana Khazaana"	Steeve Vatz, Suchitra	4:00
3.	"Welcome"	Krish, Geetha Madhuri	4:19
4.	"Seemanatu"	Mano, Rahul Nambiar, Malavika	3:55
5.	"Rangu Rangu"	Karthik	4:24
6.	"Jump Jilani (Title Track)"	Karthik Simons	1:59
Total length:			22:46

== Reception ==
The Deccan Chronicle gave the film a rating of two-and-a-half out of five and stated that "In all, this is a time-pass film in which you can expect some good laughs in the film’s second half". The Times of India gave the film two out of five stars and wrote that "You better watch the movie to find out what happens, and know finer details like the plot, music, quality of acting, writing and cinematography and the likes".

== Home media ==
The film was released on Gemini TV on 14 September 2014.
