= Prashanthini =

Indian playback singer

- Born: September 28, 1983 (age 42)
- Genres: Film Music
- Occupations: Playback singer, Anchor
- Instrument: Vocalist
- Years active: 2001-current

Prashanthini is an Indian playback singer, singing predominantly in Tamil. She is the daughter of the late Malaysian origin Tamil language playback singer-actor Malaysia Vasudevan and the younger sister of playback singer-actor Yugendran.

== Career ==
Prashanthini first began her playback career with Harris Jayaraj for the movie 12B. However, after this song, she took a long break and came back in the G. V. Prakash Kumar-composed film Veyyil. She became instantly famous after singing the song "Mundhinam Parthene" for the movie Varanam Aayiram, composed by Harris Jayaraj. Now, she is singing for many composers and hopes for long innings in playback singing without falling under her father's shadow. Her Ayyayo... (Aadukalam), Lolita... (Engeyum Kaadhal), Enge En Idhayam... (Kandaen) and Ennamo Yedho... (Ko), feature among the top 20 popular songs on FM radio. All the four numbers are melodies that have caught the imagination of the youth. In the world of film music, people are trying to track down this elusive singer with a sweet melodious voice.

== Personal life ==
Prashanthini was born on 28 September 1983. She finished Bachelor of computer application. She got married Premnath in 2008 and she has a son named Rithvik. Coincidentally, the movie 12B in which she sang her debut song was released on her birthday.

== Discography ==
- All films are in Tamil, unless otherwise noted.

Year	Film	Song	Music director	Co-singer(s)
2000	Veeranadai	"Kalaiyile"	Deva	Krishnaraj, Jayalakshmi, Sabesh, Sushmitha, Amrutha, Yugendran, Venkat Prabhu
2001	12B	"Love Pannu"	Harris Jayaraj	KK
2003	Winner	"Kozhi Kokkara"	Yuvan Shankar Raja	Udit Narayan
2003	Thathi Thavadhu Manasu	"Yetho Nenachuthan"	Deva	Ganga
2006	Veyyil	"Iraivanai"	G. V. Prakash Kumar	
2007	Veeramum Eeramum	"Purusha Payale"	Yugendran	Karthik
2008	Varanam Aayiram	"Mundhinam Parthene"	Harris Jayaraj	Naresh Iyer
2008	Nenjathai Killadhe	"Nenjathai Killathe"	Premgi Amaren	Yugendran
2008	Kee Mu	"Oru Mathiri"	Elango Kalaivanan	Yugendran
2008	Seval	"Namma Ooru Nallaarukku"	G. V. Prakash Kumar	Tippu, Manikka Vinayagam, Anuradha Sriram, Mahathi, Shreya Ghoshal
2009	Ayan	"Vizhi Moodi Yosithaal"	Harris Jayaraj	Karthik
2009	Balam	"Jingunamani"	Yugendran	Yugendran, Manikka Vinayagam
2010	Pugaippadam	"Oru Kudayil Payanam"	Gangai Amaran	Venkat Prabhu
2010	Maathi Yosi	"Maathithan Yosi"	Guru Kalyan	Sathyan
2010	Kadhalagi	"Roja Thottathil"	A. R. Reihana	Benny Dayal, Karthik, A. R. Reihana
2010	Milaga	"Kirukku Paiya"	Sabesh–Murali	Sathyan
2011	Aadukalam	"Ayyayo"	G. V. Prakash Kumar	S. P. Balasubrahmanyam, S. P. B. Charan
2011	Engeyum Kaadhal	"Lolita"	Harris Jayaraj	Karthik
2011	Ko	"Enamo Aedho"	Harris Jayaraj	Aalap Raju, Sricharan, Emcee Jesz
2011	Narthagi	"Chinnanchiru Idhayathil"	G. V. Prakash Kumar	Vijay Prakash
2011	Kandaen	"Enge En Idhayam"	Vijay Ebenezer	Dr. Burn, Krish
2011	Doo	"Oru Naal Vidu Murai"	Abhishek—Lawrence	Haricharan
2012	Kalakalappu	"Unnaipatri Unnidame"	Vijay Ebenezer	Devan Ekambaram
2012	Suzhal	"Mercury"	L. V. Ganesh	Blaaze, L. V. Muthukumarasamy
2013	Annakodi	"Pothi Vecha"	G. V. Prakash Kumar	G. V. Prakash Kumar
2013	Pannaiyarum Padminiyum	"Kaadhal Vandhaacho"	Justin Prabhakaran	Karthik
2015	Maha Maha	"Ennavo Panuthey"	Pavalar Shiva	Nivas K. Prasanna
2015	Maha Maha	"Agaramodu lagaram"	Pavalar Shiva	Valla
2026	Kadhal Reset Repeat	"Unnai Ninaithu"	Harris Jayaraj	Sid Sriram
