= Devan Ekambaram =

Indian film singer

- Born: 25 December 1975 (age 50); Freehold Township, New Jersey, United States
- Occupations: Playback Singer, Film Composer, Actor
- Instruments: Vocals, Guitar
- Years active: 1999–present

Devan Ekambaram (born 25 December 1975) is an Indian American film playback singer, actor and composer. He began his career as a playback singer in Tamil films, and later branched out to many other south Indian languages, such as Telugu and Kannada. Ekambaram has sung for over 500 films.

== Early life and career ==
Devan studied at Freehold Township High School, New Jersey. He enrolled in Electrical Engineering at the University of Illinois at Urbana–Champaign, where he dropped out in his second year.

Devan started his singing career in 1999 when he received an unexpected call from the assistants of composer A. R. Rahman, inviting him for a voice audition. He went on to record his first song, "O Maria," for the film Kadhalar Dhinam, collaborating with Yugendran.

Following "Ore Nyabagam" from the film Minnale (2001) composed by Harris Jayaraj, he sang numerous popular tracks in Tamil and Telugu films, collaborating with composers such as Ilayaraja, Vidhyasagar, Deva, Yuvan Shankar Raja, Karthik Raja, and others. The song "Anbil Avan" from the film Vinnaithaandi Varuvaayaa is composed by A. R. Rahman.

He sang "Nahna Na Nah" for Director Venkat Prabhu's Biriyani, composed by Yuvan Shankar Raja. He sang the song "Yennai Arindhaal" from the movie Yennai Arindhaal in collaboration with Harris Jayaraj.

== Music direction ==
Devan debuted as a music director in the 2010 film Bale Pandiya. The music album was received with a positive response. Besides this film, Devan has composed for several short Tamil album songs and has also sung for them.

== Discography ==
=== Tamil ===
Year	Film	Song	Composer	Co-singer(s)
1999	Unakkaga Ellam Unakkaga	"Monalisa"	Yuvan Shankar Raja	Anuradha Sriram
1999	Time	"Nenachapadi"	Ilaiyaraaja	Unni Menon, Malgudi Subha
1999	Kadhalar Dhinam	"Oh Mariya"	A. R. Rahman	Yugendran, Febi Mani
2000	Pennin Manathai Thottu	"Udhadukkum"	S. A. Rajkumar	Srividya, Febi Mani
2000	Pennin Manathai Thottu	"Kalloori Vaanil"	S. A. Rajkumar	Anuradha Sriram
2000	Kushi	"Macarena Macarena"	Deva	Sowmya Raoh
2000	Kandukondain Kandukondain	"Smayiyai"	A. R. Rahman	Clinton Cerejo, Dominique Cerejo
2000	James Pandu	"Kannenna Minsarama"	S. A. Rajkumar	
2001	Shahjahan	"May Madham"	Mani Sharma	Sujatha Mohan
2001	Ullam Kollai Poguthae	"Anjala Anjala"	Karthik Raja	Harini
2001	Chocklet	"Hosima"	Deva	Anupama
2001	Poovellam Un Vaasam	"Yukthaamukhi"	Vidyasagar	Clinton Cerejo
2001	Badri	"Salaam Maharasa"	Ramana Gogula	Priya Himesh
2001	Minnale	"Ore Nyabagam"	Harris Jayaraj	
2001	Friends	"Manjal Poosum"	Ilayaraja	Sujatha Mohan
2002	Majunu	"Mercury Mele"	Harris Jayaraj	P. Unnikrishnan
2002	Majunu	"Hari Gori"	Harris Jayaraj	Tippu, Karthik, Ganga, Febi Mani
2002	King	"Sagiye Pogathe"	Dhina	Febi Mani
2002	Vetri	"Kanavil Kandene"	Harris Jayaraj	
2002	Run	"Ichutha Ichutha"	Vidyasagar	Sowmya Raoh, Naveen, Pop Shalini
2002	Panchathanthiram	"Manmatha Leelai"	Dhina	Timothy, Mathangi Jagdish
2003	Kurumbu	"Adichchi Pudichchi"	Yuvan Shankar Raja	Sunitha Sarathy
2003	Kurumbu	"Aasai Nooru Vagai"	Yuvan Shankar Raja	Malaysia Vasudevan
2003	Winner	"Eye Um Eye Um"	Yuvan Shankar Raja	
2003	Thiruda Thirudi	"Azhaga Irukanga"	Dhina	Timmy, Master Karan
2003	Well Done	"Indhiya Mappai"	Vidyasagar	
2003	Parthiban Kanavu	"Theeradha Dum"	Vidyasagar	Tippu, Manikka Vinayagam
2003	Pudhiya Geethai	"Vasiyakaara - I"	Yuvan Shankar Raja	Chitra Sivaraman
2003	Punnagai Poove	"Venus Venus Pennae"	Yuvan Shankar Raja	Harini
2004	Bose	"Enna Enna Aachu"	Yuvan Shankar Raja	Mathangi Jagdish
2004	Machi	"Holiday"	A. R. Reihana	
2004	Maha Nadigan	"Pillaiyara Vendiko"	Deva	
2004	Giri	"Dei Kaiya Vechikitu Summa Iruda"	D. Imman	Anuradha Sriram
2006	Vettaiyaadu Vilaiyaadu	"Karka Karka"	Harris Jayaraj	Tippu, Andrea Jeremiah, Nakul
2006	Thalai Nagaram	"Yedho Ninaikiren"	D. Imman	
2007	Kasu Irukkanum	"Kadhal Sammatham"	Kavin Saradha, Raj Shankar	Anuradha Sriram
2008	Vaaranam Aayiram	"Nenjukkul Peidhidum"	Harris Jayaraj	Hariharan, Krish, Prasanna
2008	Azhaipithazh	"Ley Ley"	Hitesh	
2009	Ayan	"Honey Honey"	Harris Jayaraj	Sayanora Philip
2010	Bale Pandiya	"Happy"	Devan Ekambaram	Haricharan, Naresh Iyer, Naveen, Ranjith, Rahul Nambiar, Paravai Muniyamma, Manikka Vinayagam, Anuradha Sriram, Srinivas, Mukesh, Divya, Suchitra, Velmurugan, Malgudi Subha, Vijay Yesudas, Aalap Raju
2010	Vinnaithaandi Varuvaayaa	"Anbil Avan"	A. R. Rahman	Chinmayi
2011	Vandhaan Vendraan	"Anjo"	S. Thaman	Rahul Nambiar, Haricharan
2011	Kandaen	"Ninaivugal"	Vijay Ebenezer	
2011	Engeyum Kadhal	"Engeyum Kadhal"	Harris Jayaraj	Aalap Raju, Ranina Reddy
2012	Kalakalappu	"Unnaipattri Unnidame"	Vijay Ebenezer	Prashanthini
2013	Endrendrum Punnagai	"Vaan Engum Nee Minna"	Harris Jayaraj	Aalap Raju, Harini, Praveen
2013	Biriyani	"Nahna Nah Na"	Yuvan Shankar Raja	
2013	Biriyani	"Nahna Na Nah (New Jack Swing Mix)"	Yuvan Shankar Raja	Yuvan Shankar Raja, Premgi Amaren
2013	Biriyani	"Nahna Na Nah (Extended Dance Mix)"	Yuvan Shankar Raja	Yuvan Shankar Raja, Premgi Amaren
2013	Settai	"Theme Music of Settai"	S. Thaman	
2014	Yaan	"Hey Lamba Lamba"	Harris Jayaraj	Krishna Iyer, Divya Vijay
2015	Om Shanthi Om	"Mazhai Thuli Azhaga"	Vijay Ebenezer	Aalap Raju, Dr. Burn
2015	Yennai Arindhaal	"Yennai Arindhaal"	Harris Jayaraj	Mark Thomas, Abhishek
2015	Idhu Enna Maayam	"Machi Machi"	G. V. Prakash Kumar	Udit Narayan, Navin Iyer
2016	Hello Naan Pei Pesuren	"Kozhi Kuruda"	Siddharth Vipin	Shweta Mohan
2018	Pyaar Prema Kaadhal	"I Will Never Let You Go"	Yuvan Shankar Raja	
2019	Kee	"Pathikichu Paatheeya"	Vishal Chandrasekhar	
2024	Unarvugal Thodarkadhai	"Thodarum Kadhaiyaaga"	Ajmal Khan	Niharika Patro

=== Telugu ===
Year	Film	Song	Composer	Co-singer(s)
1999	Premikula Roju (D)	"Oh Mariya"	A. R. Rahman	Yugendran, Febi Mani
2000	Suri	"Monnatidaka"	Vidyasagar	
2000	Nuvve Kavali	"Ammammalu Thathayyalu"	Koti	Anuradha Sriram
2001	Kushi	"Premante"	Mani Sharma	Kalpana
2002	Adrustam	"Sairo Sairo"	Dhina	Kiran
2002	Run (D)	"Ichutha Ichutha"	Vidyasagar	Sowmya Raoh, Naveen, Pop Shalini
2002	Nuvve Nuvve	"Computerlu"	Koti	Anuradha Sriram
2002	Kalusukovalani	"Shakeela"	Deva	Mathangi
2002	Vasu	"O Prema"	Harris Jayaraj	
2002	Panchatantram (D)	"Ne Pennu Nuvvu Paper"	Deva	Tippu, Mathangi
2003	Naaga	"Macarina"	Deva	
2005	Mogudu Pellam O Dongodu	"Vayyari Bhama"	Mani Sharma	Sumangali
2005	Vennela	"Super Model"	Mahesh Shankar	Karthik, Saindhavi
2005	Vennela	"Chesthara Love"	Mahesh Shankar	Sudeep, Saindhavi, Rajani, Anitha
2005	Vennela	"Busy Life"	Mahesh Shankar	Aravind, Sudeep, Funky M.
2006	Ashok	"Mumtaju Mahalu"	Mani Sharma	Tanvi Shah
2007	Chirutha	"Endhuko Pichi Pichi"	Mani Sharma	N. C. Karunya, Sooraj Santhosh, Ranjith, Naveen Madhav, Chakri
2010	Ye Maaya Chesave	"Manasaa"	A. R. Rahman	Chinmayi
2010	Orange	"Hello Rammante"	Harris Jayaraj	Vijay Prakash, D. Burn
2013	Sahasam	"Sahasam"	Sri	
2018	Tholi Prema	"Vinnane Vinnane"	S. Thaman	Armaan Malik

=== Kannada ===
Year	Film	Song	Composer	Co-singer(s)
2000	Yajamana	"Navile Pancharangi Navile"	Rajesh Ramanath	Nanditha
2001	Bahala Chennagide	"Chori Chori"	Koti	
2001	Jodi	"Darling"	S. A. Rajkumar	S. P. Balasubrahmanyam
2001	Jodi	"Gentleman"	S. A. Rajkumar	S. P. Balasubrahmanyam
2002	Prema Khaidi	"Ree Ree"	Prashanth Raj	Anuradha Sriram
2003	Pakka Chukka	"Odu Odu"	S. Narayan	
2003	Ooh La La	"Dum Dum Dum Yenal Adam"	Suresh Devkumar	
2007	Nali Naliyutha	"Nille Hani"	Rajesh Ramanath	Chaitra H. G.
2008	Accident	"Friendship Andre"	Ricky Kej	
2017	Toss	"Nidde Madi"	Gautham Srivatsa	

== Filmography ==
Year	Title	Role	Notes
2003	Parthiban Kanavu	Prabhu	
2007	Unnale Unnale	Vaidyanathan's roommate	
2008	Jayam Kondaan	Devan	

As dubbing artist

Year	Title	Actor	Character	Notes
2003	Little John	Bentley Mitchum	John McKenzie	
2008	Dasavathaaram		Suresh	
2007	7 Aum Arivu	Johnny Trí Nguyễn	Dong Lee and other Chinese characters	
