= Ya Ya (film) =

2013 Indian film by I. Rajasekaran

- Theatrical poster
- Directed by: I. Rajasekaran
- Written by: I. Rajasekaran
- Produced by: MS Murugaraj
- Starring: Shiva; Santhanam; Dhansika; Sandhya
- Cinematography: Vetri
- Edited by: T. S. Suresh
- Music by: Vijay Ebenezer
- Production company: M10 Productions
- Distributed by: Sri Lakshmi Productions
- Release date: 20 September 2013
- Running time: 130 minutes
- Country: India
- Language: Tamil

Ya Ya is a 2013 Indian Tamil-language comedy film written and directed by debutant I. Rajasekaran, who was an assistant to Director M. Rajesh. The film stars Shiva, Santhanam, Dhansika and Sandhya. It received 'U/A' certificate from Central Board of Film Certification. The film received mixed reviews from critics, but become a decent success at the box office.

== Plot ==
There are two friends, Ramarajan and Rajkiran, who for reasons unknown, prefer to call themselves Dhoni and Sehwag, respectively. They have nothing better to do than hang around together, booze, and tease pretty girls. Dhoni does not believe in the idea of working but is still in search of a government job, knowing very well that he is not likely to get it. Kanaka, a police constable, is the daughter of Dhoni’s maternal uncle, and though their families want them to marry, neither is interested.

Meanwhile, Dhoni, while going for an interview, meets and falls in love with Seetha. He is so impressed by her that when he meets the ugly-looking, buck-toothed local councillor Aishwarya, who has promised him a job, he hugs her and declares his undying love for her, believing her to be Seetha. Though he apologizes to her, the much older Aishwarya is now very much in love with Dhoni and is determined to marry him. She gives money to Sehwag so that he separates Dhoni and Seetha's love. Sehwag arranges Dhoni's sister's friends to pose as his lover to separate him. Seetha believes this rumor and breaks up with him. Dhoni blames Seetha as the "accused no. 1" who cheated him. He then learns that it was Sehwag's plan to separate him, so he ends their friendship.

Aishwarya's fat brothers record Sehwag's speech scolding Aishwarya in an inebriated state. In the early morning, Dhoni attends Kanaka's marriage but is shocked that Sehwag is the marriage groom. Seetha still mistakes Dhoni as a womaniser when she sees the same girl coming out misunderstanding. The girl tells all the truth to Dhoni about the plan which was overheard by Seetha. Aishwarya tries to kidnap Seetha but instead gets kidnapped by Beerpal who mistakes her to be Seetha in order to take revenge on her for rejecting his love. After the marriage, Dhoni scolds Seetha alone himself for loving him then Seetha arrives at that place and again misunderstands him, she urges him to commit suicide. Meanwhile, Varadharajan is searching for Dhoni, who disappeared from home. Seetha is feeling guilty for his disappearance and also thinks that he might have committed suicide. Dhoni arrives at their home, saying he disappeared from home to conduct the marriage of Aishwarya and Beerpal. The film ends with Dhoni and Sehwag uniting with their lovers happily.

== Cast ==
- Shiva as Ramarajan (Dhoni)
- Santhanam as Rajkiran (Sehwag)
- Dhansika as Seetha
- Sandhya as Kanaka
- Powerstar Srinivasan as Beerpal (extended cameo role)
- Devadarshini as Councillor Aishwarya
- Ilavarasu as Varadharajan
- Rekha as Dhoni's mother
- R. N. R. Manohar as Seetha's father
- Chitra Lakshmanan as Kanaka's father
- Aarthi as Vijayashanti
- George Vishnu as Sehwag's assistant
- Cool Suresh as Sehwag's assistant
- Thalapathy Dinesh as Aishwarya's brother
- Rithi Mangal as LIC Agent Geetha
- Kili Ramachandran

== Production ==
Remya Nambeesan was roped in after her appreciated performance in Pizza but she was later replaced by Dhansika. Doctor turned actor Powerstar Srinivasan will be part of Ya Ya. Sandhya is said to be playing the hot and happening comedian Santhanam’s love interest in Ya Ya. The shoot of the film started from 18 Jan 2013 in Chennai.

The film is produced by M. S. Murugaraj who earlier worked as a production manager to various producers such as T. Rama Rao, Poornachandra Rao, Mohan Natrajan, and actor Vishal, Murugaraj wanted to produce a film on his own, when he heard the story from director I. Rajasekaran, he immediately wanted to start production and invited Santhanam and Siva for a story discussion.

== Soundtrack ==
Ya Ya

Soundtrack album to Ya Ya by Vijay Ebenezer
- Released: 19 June 2013
- Recorded: 2013
- Genre: Feature film soundtrack
- Language: Tamil
- Label: Sony Music India
- Producer: Vijay Ebenezer

Vijay Ebenezer chronology
Kalakalappu (2012)	Ya Ya (2013)	Pappali (2013)

The soundtrack is composed by Vijay Ebenezer. The audio was released on 19 June 2013 at Sathyam Cinema Theatre. Shiva, Dhansika, the film's director I.Rajasekaran (a former assistant to Rajesh and SA Chandrasekhar), the producer M.S.Murugaraj, T.Rama Rao and T. Ajay Kumar from Sree Lakshmi Productions (the distributors of Ya Ya) were among the dignitaries present. Thanu, R.B.Choudary, directors Rajesh, Hari, Sundar C, Pandiraj and Badri were also present. Santhanam couldn't make it for the event due to his obviously busy schedules. Milliblog wrote:"Ya Ya is thoroughly disappointing, after promising efforts like Kandaen and Kalakalappu". Behindwoods called it "safe and sound". Indiaglitz wrote:"Music carved with the comical visualization in mind".

No.	Title	Singer(s)	Length
1.	"Friende Podhum"	Ranjith, Steve Vatz
2.	"Oru Kannadiya"	Karthik
3.	"Neethane Endru"	Krish, Suchitra
4.	"Nothing Want"	Steeve Vatz
5.	"Bhoomi Nalla"	Rahul Nambiar, Malavika
6.	"Yaaru Kitta"	Krish, M. L. R. Karthikeyan

== Release ==
Andhra-based company Sree Lakshmi Productions which produced Tamil films like Dhill, Youth and Malaikottai distributed Ya Ya all over India.

== Reception ==
The film opened to negative reviews from critics. Prasanth Reddy from Desimartini said that "Ya Yaa is an average movie, with a story that lacks direction and performances that failed to deliver". Rediff.com gave the film a 2/5 stating "Ya Yaa is an average movie, with a story that lacks direction and performances that failed to deliver".

Behindwoods wrote: "The audiences watch Shiva's films purely for the comedy and this film could have done without the few scenes of gory violence, especially since it features Santhanam too, but instead it stretches itself into death and mourning segments that hamper the proceedings".

Baradwaj Rangan of The Hindu wrote "The trouble with Ya Yaa is that it isn’t even much of a comedy — its rhythms are those of drama...if gags are all you’re after, why not go all-out absurd like The Naked Gun movies?"
