= Om Shanthi Om =

2015 Indian film by D. Suryaprabhakar

- Poster
- Directed by: Suryaprabhakar
- Produced by: Arumai Chandran; Haresh Vikram Vijayakumar
- Starring: Srikanth; Neelam Upadhyaya
- Cinematography: Bhaskaran K. M.
- Edited by: Vivek Harshan
- Music by: Vijay Ebenezer
- Production company: 8 Point Entertainment
- Release date: 30 October 2015
- Running time: 162 minutes
- Country: India
- Language: Tamil

Om Shanthi Om is a 2015 Tamil language supernatural drama film directed by D. Suryaprabhakar and produced by Arumai Chandran.The film stars Srikanth and Neelam Upadhyaya, while Vijay Ebenezer composes the film's music. The film was released in October 2015. It is loosely based on the American fantasy film Heart and Souls.

== Plot ==
The film opens with a bus accident in which only one survivor is there, Vasu. The film flashes forward six months later. Vasu works in an automobile showroom and falls in love with Shanthi, whom he also hires as his employee. Vasu begins to notice five individuals following him everywhere he goes. He confronts them, and they tell him they need his help, and he agrees. As he fulfils their wishes, he learns that they were involved in the same bus accident as he was, and they have appeared as spirits so their last wishes can be fulfilled. Shanthi mistakes the signs of Vasu talking with the ghosts as a psychological problem, and the lovers separate. Can Vasu fulfill the spirits' wishes and get back together with Shanthi?

== Cast ==
- Srikanth as Vasu
- Neelam Upadhyaya as Shanthi
- Junior Balaiah as Balasubramaniam
- Aadukalam Naren as Lingesan
- Rajendran as Vavval Pandi
- MAK Raman
- Arumugavel
- Vinodhini Vaidyanathan as Kumar's mother
- Saran Shakthi as Kumar
- Gowthami Chowdary as Sabitha
- Master Siddharth as Akash
- Ayyappa Baiju
- Kadal Saran
- Yuvan Swang
- Nithyashree
- Maulik Chauhan as Mahesh

== Production ==
The film began its first schedule in February 2013 with little fanfare and scenes were shot around Trichy.

== Soundtrack ==
Om Shanthi Om

Soundtrack album by Vijay Ebenezer
- Released: 2015
- Length: 25:02
- Language: Tamil
- Producer: Vijay Ebenezer

Vijay Ebenezer chronology
Pappali (2014)	Om Shanthi Om (2015)

The music was composed by Vijay Ebenezer.

Tracklist
No.	Title	Singer(s)	Length
1.	"Enendru Solvadho"	Harish Raghavendra, Shweta Mohan	4:59
2.	"Mazhai Thuli Azhaga"	Aalap Raju, Dr. Burn, Devan Ekambaram	4:53
3.	"Aathoram Voodukatti"	Steeve Vatz, Malathy Lakshman	3:40
4.	"Ivaldhana (Eravum Pagalum)"	Krish, Malavika	4:24
5.	"Kalthondrum Munnamey"	Krish	3:03
6.	"Thattungada"	Ranjith, Priya Himesh	4:03
Total length:			25:02

== Critical reception ==
The Times of India rated the film 2 out of 5, comparing the concept with Venkat Prabhu's Massu Engira Masilamani and noted, "while Venkat Prabhu used the premise of the hero being able to see ghosts to tell a revenge masala, D Suryaprabaakar gives us an emotional drama."
