= Action 3D =

- Movie Poster
- Directed by: Anil Sunkara
- Produced by: Rama Brahmam Sunkara
- Starring: Allari Naresh; Shaam; Vaibhav; Raju Sundaram
- Cinematography: Sarvesh Murari
- Edited by: M. R. Varma
- Music by: Songs: Bappi Lahiri; Score: Sunny M. R.
- Production company: AK Entertainments
- Distributed by: AK Entertainments; Gayatri Devi Films (Vizag)
- Release date: 21 June 2013
- Running time: 150 mins
- Country: India
- Language: Telugu

Action 3D is a 2013 Indian Telugu-language 3D comedy film directed by Anil Sunkara, starring an ensemble cast of Allari Naresh, Shaam, Vaibhav, and Raju Sundaram. The film was released on 21 June 2013. The film is based on The Hangover (2009).

== Cast ==
- Allari Naresh as Bala Vardhan "Bava"
- Shaam as Ajay
- Vaibhav as Shiva
- Raju Sundaram as Purushottam "Purush"
- Neelam Upadhyaya as Geetha
- Sneha Ullal as Sameera
- Kamna Jethmalani as Anitha
- Ritu Barmecha as Sandhya
- Sheena Shahabadi as Shruthi
- Brahmanandam as Magnet Mama
- M. S. Narayana as Bokka Babu
- Ali as ATM Jackson
- Sunil as Oruganti Bala Mahesh
- Posani Krishna Murali as a director
- Krishna Bhagawan as Doctor
- Master Bharath as Hotel waiter
- Shankar Melkote
- Sudipto Balav
- Jhansi
- Prudhvi Raj
- Sudeepa in a guest appearance

== Production ==
Anil Sunkara, making his directorial debut after the success of his production venture Dookudu, signed on Allari Naresh to play the lead role in a comedy 3D film in November 2011. Kannada actor Sudeepa, who starred in Eega (2012) made a special appearance in the Telugu version while Silambarasan made a guest appearance in the unreleased Tamil version titled Aasu Raja Rani Jackie Matrum Joker.

== Soundtrack ==
Action 3D

Soundtrack album by Bappi Lahiri, Bappa Lahiri
- Released: 22 April 2013
- Recorded: 2013
- Genre: Feature film soundtrack
- Length: 25:14
- Language: Telugu
- Label: A Series

Bappi Lahari and his son Bappa Lahari composed the songs for this film. The audio was launched on 22 April 2013 at Prasads Multiplex in Hyderabad.

Track listing
No.	Title	Lyrics	Singer(s)	Length
1.	"Sunday Monday"	Ramajogayya Sastry	Ranjith, Suchitra	4:41
2.	"Pretty Girl"	Sirasri	Raghu Kunche	2:38
3.	"Oo Lala"	Ramajogayya Sastry	Bappi Lahari	5:13
4.	"Ding Dong"	Ramajogayya Sastry	Priya Himesh, Chinni Charan	3:49
5.	"Swathi Mutyapu Jallulalo"	Veturi	Karthik, Divija	4:49
6.	"Mamasitha"	Bhuvanachandra	Baba Sehgal, Bappi Lahari	4:09
Total length:				25:14

== Reception ==
A critic from The Times of India gave the film a rating of two-and-a-half out of five stars and stated that " The movie does pack a few gags, but there’s plenty that can make you cringe as well. Watch it purely to get a taste of the extra dimension". A critic from The Hindu wrote that "Watch this only if your idea of having fun is watching crude humour on 3D".
