= Ishaara Nair =

Indian actress (born 1993)

- Born: 30 May 1986 (age 40); Bangalore, India
- Occupation: Actress
- Years active: 2012-present
- Spouse: Sahil

Ishaara Nair is an Indian actress who has worked in the Tamil and Telugu film industries.

== Career ==
Ishaara Nair made her debut through the drama film, Venmegam (2014) and before the film's release, she had secured four more film offers. Though her debut film went unnoticed, she won critical acclaim for her role as an innocent saleswoman in Vinoth's con-comedy Sathuranga Vettai (2014). A critic from Sify.com noted Ishara "suits the character to a T and makes a smashing debut", while she won a nomination for Best Debut Actress at the 4th South Indian International Movie Awards. She starred in the unreleased film Papparapaam. Also she dons the role of a college girl in Adhi Medhavigal with VJ Suresh and in one of the lead roles in the horror film, Selfie. Her next signing was Engada Iruthinga Ivvalavu Naala (2021), written and directed by Kevin.

== Filmography ==
Year	Film	Role	Notes
2014	Venmegam	Raji	
2014	Pappali	Subbalakshmi	
2014	Sathuranga Vettai	Bhanu	
2017	Ivan Yarendru Therikiratha	Priya	
2021	Engada Iruthinga Ivvalavu Naala		
