= Unnodu Oru Naal =

2013 Indian film by Durai Karthikeyan

- Theatrical release poster
- Directed by: Durai Karthikeyan
- Produced by: Arunmozhi Manikam
- Starring: Arjun Vijayraghavan; Gibran; Neelam
- Cinematography: Vijayaraj
- Music by: Sivaprakasam
- Production company: Jarci Production
- Release date: 13 September 2013
- Country: India
- Language: Tamil

Unnodu Oru Naal (transl. A day with you) is a 2013 Indian Tamil-language romantic thriller film directed by Durai Karthikeyan and starring Arjun Vijayraghavan, Gibran and Neelam. The film is inspired by the American film Across the Hall (2009). It was released on 13 September 2013. The Tamil film Ner Ethir (2014) has a similar storyline.

== Premise ==
The film is about two friends who fall in love with the same girl.

Madhav falls in love with Priya, but Priya leaves Madhav and falls in love with Karthik. Madhav tries to forget Priya and leaves the country. Karthik marries Priya but later reveals a different side of himself. What happens next forms the rest of the story.

== Cast ==
- Arjun Vijayraghavan as Karthik
- Gibran Osman as Madhav
- Neelam as Priya
- Suganthi as Anitha
- Tajudeen as Karthik (DK)
- Raghavan as Ragha
- Prabhu as Prabhu
- Pari as Ashwini
- Nikitha as Nikitha
- Krishna as Krishna
- Imran as Imran
- Annadurai as Security
- Vanniyavel as Head Waiter
- Babu as Chef
- Kathiresan as Chef
- Kaali as Chef
- Ganesh Subramaniam as Man in Priya's room
- Karthikeyan as Inspector
- Ameer as Traffic Inspector
- Seenu as Traffic Constable
- Narayanan as Man with Traffic Constable
- Emmanuel as Office Boy
- Vinoth as Vinoth
- Biju as Biju
- Sunil as Sunil

== Production ==
Director Durai Karthikeyan died during the film's production, and his assistant Shakthi took over the direction.

== Soundtrack ==
The music is composed by Sivaprakasam. Lyrics by G. Malathi and Rudra. The music launch was attended by A. R. Reihana and Shantha Kumar.

- "Angel Nee" - Haricharan, Krithika
- "Angel Nee" (remix) - Master Abishekh, Krithika
- "Swasathil" - Chinmayi
- "Dhoova Dhovaa" - Bhagyaraj, VJ Divya

== Reception ==
M. Suganth of The Times of India opined that "With a weak script and limp performances, Durai Karthikeyan’s debut film mostly resembles a student film that has managed to get screened on the big screen". On the contrary, Malini Mannath of The New Indian Express wrote that "Unnodu... is ideal fare for lovers of this genre".
