= Ivan Yarendru Therikiratha =

2017 Indian film by S. T. Suresh Kumar

- Theatrical release poster
- Directed by: S. T. Suresh Kumar
- Produced by: Te.Ashok kumar
- Starring: Vishnu; Varsha Bollamma; Ishaara Nair
- Cinematography: P & G
- Edited by: Gopi Krishna
- Music by: N. R. Raghunanthan
- Production company: Own Cinemas
- Release date: 30 June 2017
- Running time: 136 minutes
- Country: India
- Language: Tamil

Ivan Yarendru Therikiratha (transl. Do you know who he is?) is a 2017 Indian Tamil-language romantic comedy drama film directed by Suresh Kumar, a former assistant of Suseenthiran. The film stars television actor Vishnu, Varsha Bollamma, and Ishaara Nair in the lead roles. This film marks the lead debut of Vishnu.

== Plot ==
Arivu (Vishnu) graduates from college and hangs out with his friends (Arjunan and Rajkumar). His father (Jayaprakash) is very fond of him. The naive Arivu is used by both of his friends for their love interests and gets in trouble for his irresponsible acts with his friends. His friends have girlfriends, while Arivu is all by himself. On Valentine's Day, Arivu challenges his friends to find a girlfriend after they tease him. He remembers his college classmate, Priya (Ishaara Nair), and searches for her. Much to his disappointment, she is married and has kids. He later meets a sub-inspector of police, Savithri (Varsha Bollamma). Whether or not she falls in love with him forms the crux of the story.

== Cast ==
- Vishnu as Arivu
- Varsha Bollamma as Sub-Inspector Savithri
- Ishaara Nair as Shanthi
- K. Bhagyaraj as Love Guru
- Jayaprakash as Arivu's father
- Bagavathi Perumal as Bombay Boys member
- Aruldoss as Bombay Boys member
- Ramachandran Durairaj as Bombay Boys member
- Arjunan as Arivu's friend
- Rajkumar as Arivu's friend
- Saravana Sakthi

== Production ==
Vishnu, Varsha Bollamma, and Ishaara Nair were signed to feature in a film helmed by debutante Suresh Kumar. Veteran actor K. Bhagyaraj was signed to portray the character of a love guru. The film's title is derived from a song from Vishwaroopam (2013).

== Soundtrack ==
The songs were composed by N. R. Raghunanthan.

Song title	Singer(s)
"Atha Ponnu"	Anisha, Velmurugan
"Aala Paaru Aala"	Abhay Jodhpurkar, Vaishali Jayashankar
"Ponnala"	Harish, Mahalingam
"Aana Porunthavan"	Anthony Daasan, Krishnaraj

== Release and reception ==
The film was released on 30 June. Maalai Malar wrote that director Sureshkumar has tried to mix love and comedy in his first film; the first half of the film is very slow, but the second half is very lively. He made an entertaining film that people can watch as a family. Ananda Vikatan gave the film a more unfavourable review and wrote that Sureshkumar has a lot of talent as shown by the beginning and ending of the film but criticized the middle part of the film.
