= Engada Iruthinga Ivvalavu Naala =

Indian Tamil film

- Theatrical release poster
- Directed by: Kevin
- Produced by: Durai Shudhakar
- Starring: Akhil; Ishara Nair; Manishajith
- Cinematography: Rahim Babu
- Edited by: Suresh Urs
- Music by: Varshan; Jayden
- Production company: Nila Promoters
- Distributed by: TN75 KK Creations
- Release date: 26 March 2021
- Running time: 114 mins
- Country: India
- Language: Tamil

Engada Iruthinga Ivvalavu Naala (transl. Where Were You All These Days?) is a 2021 Tamil language romantic comedy film directed by Kevin and starring Akhil and Ishara Nair in the lead roles. Produced by Thilaka Arts, it was released on 26 March 2021.

== Cast ==
- Akhil as Sanjay
- Ishara Nair
- Manishajith as Kanimozhi
- Sahana Sheddy
- Krishnapriya
- Kausalya as Sanjay's mother
- Kevin
- Super Subbarayan as Nadangkannu
- K. Sivasankar as Master
- Rajendran as Nesamani
- Manobala as Ganesan
- Yogi Babu as Aspiring actor
- Bala Singh as Master
- Shakeela as Shakeela
- Mippu
- Lokesh
- Sharmila Thapa
- Thangadurai

== Production ==
Kevin made his directorial debut with the film, twenty years after trying to break into the film industry. The film began production in early 2016 and Akhil was cast in the lead role. Four actresses were signed on to star in the film - Ishara Nair, Manishajith, Sahana and Krishnapriya.

In June 2016, Ishara Nair complained that Kevin had subject her to sexual harassment in the sets of the film. She added that the director had wasted her dates, while also making unwelcome advances during the shoot.

Throughout 2020, Kevin tried to find distributors to release the film through an over-the-top media service but the lack of high-profile actors in the film meant that there were no takers.

== Release ==
The film was released theatrically across Tamil Nadu on 26 March 2021. A critic from Maalaimalar gave the film a mixed review, citing it lacked excitement.
