= Pappali =

2014 Indian film by A. Govindamoorthy

- Directed by: A. Govindamoorthy
- Produced by: S. Ambedkumar; Ranjiv Menon
- Starring: Senthil Kumar; Ishaara Nair; Jagan
- Cinematography: Vijay
- Music by: Vijay Ebenezer
- Production company: Arasoor Movies
- Release date: 11 July 2014
- Country: India
- Language: Tamil

Pappali (transl. Papaya) is a 2014 Indian Tamil-language film directed by A. Govindamoorthy. It stars Senthil Kumar and Ishaara Nair in the lead roles, while Saranya Ponvannan, Singampuli and Jagan play supporting roles. The film, with music composed by Vijay Ebenezer, was released on 11 July 2014.

== Cast ==
- Senthil Kumar as Karthik
- Ishaara Nair as Subbalakshmi
- Jagan
- Ilavarasu
- Saranya Ponvannan
- Singampuli
- Aadukalam Naren
- Nirosha

== Production ==
Govindamurthy, who had previously directed Karuppusamy Kuththagaithaarar (2007) and Vedigundu Murugesan (2009), approached the producers with a script and they readily agreed to produce the venture after listening to his narration. He revealed that the team signed on Senthil Kumar and Ishara Nair to work on the film, as the team could not afford bigger stars and could not afford to wait for their dates.

== Soundtrack ==
Soundtrack was composed by Vijay Ebenezer. The songs of the film were released in March 2014.

- Bus stoppile - Velumurugan
- Kaalam Namadhu - M. L. R. Karthikeyan
- Nee En Aruge - Karthik, Shweta Mohan
- Manaivi Veettil - Magizhini Manimaran, Aranai Natrajan
- Ethethi - Ranjith, Harini

== Release and reception ==
The film opened to poor reviews in July 2014, with a critic from Sify noting that the film "is a crude and crass comedy laced with sentiments", adding the "film lacks technical finesse and is difficult to sit through". The New Indian Express wrote "The first half with its crude comedy, jarring at times, leads one to believe that the film would be a mindless comic caper. But the latter part makes up for it, taking a total about-turn" praising the message of the film.
