= Kalakalappu =

2012 Indian film by Sundar C

- Theatrical release poster
- Directed by: Sundar C
- Written by: Badri (dialogues)
- Screenplay by: Sundar C
- Story by: Sundar C
- Produced by: Ronnie Screwvala; Siddharth Roy Kapur; Khushbu; Sundar C
- Starring: Vimal; Shiva; Anjali; Oviya; Santhanam
- Cinematography: U. K. Senthil Kumar
- Edited by: Praveen K. L.; N. B. Srikanth
- Music by: Vijay Ebenezer
- Production companies: Avni Cinemax; UTV Motion Pictures
- Distributed by: UTV Motion Pictures
- Release date: 11 May 2012
- Running time: 154 minutes
- Country: India
- Language: Tamil
- Budget: est. ₹6.5 crore

Kalakalappu (transl. Humour) is a 2012 Indian Tamil-language comedy film directed by Sundar C. Produced by Avni Cinemax and UTV Motion Pictures, the film stars Vimal, Shiva, Anjali, Oviya and Santhanam, with music composed by Vijay Ebenezer. It revolves around a restaurant owner and his brother seeking to save the restaurant from closure.

The film was originally titled Masala Café, but was later renamed. Shot between November 2011 and April 2012, It was released on 11 May 2012 and became a commercial success. The film was remade in Telugu as Jump Jilani (2014). In 2018, a spiritual successor Kalakalappu 2 was released. The film is loosely based on the 2009 German film Soul Kitchen.

== Plot ==
Seenu runs the Kumbakonam-based Masala Café, inherited from his forefathers. Masala Café was once a famous food outlet for decades ago but has lost its prominence, and now Seenu finds it difficult to manage the struggling enterprise. The café's chef and his granddaughter Maya stay with Seenu.

Madhavi, a health inspector, decides to permanently shut down Masala Café due to its unhygienic environment. Seenu requests her to give him some time so he can make his food joint regain its past glory. Slowly, Seenu and Madhavi become good friends, and love blossoms between them.

Seenu's younger brother Raghu, a con artist, is released from prison. Seenu allows Raghu to stay with him as Raghu saves him from Anjuvatti Alagesan (transl. Five-interest Alagesan), to whom Seenu owes money. Raghu falls in love with Maya at first sight. Manickam, a jewellery owner, sets fire to his jewellery showroom for an insurance claim, although he has safely hidden precious diamonds in a mobile phone which is with Kumar, his nephew. Kumar misplaces the phone containing the diamonds, which later gets into Raghu's hands.

Dharmarajan, a cunning police inspector, is a childhood friend of Seenu. A real estate developer plans to demolish Masala Café and construct a mall over there due to its prime location. But Seenu is unwilling to sell his property as he prefers to own it in the memory of his family members. Dharmarajan assures to convince Seenu and make him sell the hotel and he talks a deal with the real estate developer.

Seenu, Raghu, Madhavi, and Maya come up with a plan to introduce traditional healthy food menu in Masala Café, believing that it will be liked by the present generation. Maya's grandfather gives tips about healthy ingredients, and Masala Café becomes popular again due to differentiated menu. Seenu earns more money from Masala Café.

Meanwhile, Madhavi's wedding is fixed with her relative Vettupuli in the village by her family. Seenu goes to Madhavi's village to stop the wedding and bring her back to Kumbakonam.

When Seenu is away, Dharmarajan plans to grab Masala Café as it is now managed only by Raghu, who is addicted to gambling. Dharmarajan calls Raghu for gambling, for which Raghu accepts. Dharmarajan tricks Raghu into gambling using his hotel documents. Raghu loses, and Dharmarajan takes over Masala Café. Seenu gets shocked knowing that Dharmarajan has betrayed them. After a series of events, Vettupuli learns about Seenu and Madhavi's love and decides to let them marry.

Manickam tracks down that the phone containing diamonds is with Raghu and comes to kill him and take back the diamonds. But Seenu and Raghu get to know about the diamonds being hidden in the phone only after Manickam comes. Seenu and Raghu escape from Manickam. Manickam kidnaps Maya and Madhavi and threatens Seenu and Raghu to give back the diamonds. A fight sequence follows where Seenu and Raghu beat Manickam. In the meantime, they also grab the hotel's documents from Dharmarajan. The police restore the diamonds and arrest Dharmarajan and Manickam. Seenu unites with Madhavi and Raghu with Maya.

== Cast ==
- Vimal as Seenu
- Shiva as Raghu
- Anjali as Madhavi
- Oviya as Maya
- Santhanam as Vettupuli
- Ilavarasu as Anjuvatti Alagesan
- Manobala as Marudhamuthu
- V. S. Raghavan as Natarajan
- Subbu Panchu as Manickam
- Vichu Vishwanath as Manickam's henchman
- John Vijay as Dharmarajan
- Shanmugasundaram as Minister Sundaram
- Bava Lakshmanan as Mandakasaayam
- George Maryan as Constable Pachchai Perumal
- Karunakaran as Inba Kumar
- Yogi Babu as 'Malakottai' Shankar
- Pei Krishnan as Pei
- Balaji K. Mohan as the chef
- Kaali Venkat as Raghu's friend
- Kalloori Vinoth as a pickpocket
- Thalapathy Dinesh as Thimeengalam (uncredited)

== Production ==
A report in December 2010 suggested that Sundar C would quit acting, after his films successively failed, and concentrate on directing only. By September 2011, he was confirmed to be developing a film with Vimal and Shiva as the lead actors. Shiva said Sundar wrote his character with him in mind but let him improvise to his liking. Sundar said that idea of the film occurred to him during the shooting of Murattu Kaalai (2012). Anjali was confirmed as one of the lead actresses in October 2011. Oviya, who plays the other lead actress, said this would be her first glamorous role. Vadivelu was expected to get a pivotal role in the film and make a comeback, but was later replaced by Santhanam. Karunakaran made his feature film debut. The title of the film, Masala Café was announced in mid-October. It was jointly produced by Avni Cinemax and UTV Motion Pictures.

Filming began on 2 November in Kumbakonam. Majority of the film was shot in Gobichettipalayam. Ilavarasu was supposed to appear in drag in one scene but could not shave his moustache which he needed for another film. The makers instead adorned him with a wig used by Vadivelu in Sundar's Nagaram Marupakkam (2010) and soon a "bright orange pant and colourful shirt". Because this gave the look of a 1970s Bollywood actor, they nicknamed the character "Amitabh Mama" (transl. Amitabh uncle) onscreen because of Amitabh Bachchan's popularity in the 1970s. The new title Kalakalappu was announced in April 2012, by which point filming was over and the film was in post-production.

== Soundtrack ==
The music is composed by Vijay Ebenezer. It was initially reported that Vimal had sung a few lines for a song. Lyricist Pa. Vijay said that Vimal did practice for the song, but ultimately could not record the final version due to time constraints. The song "Ivaluka Imsai Thaanka Mudiyala" contains the lyrics "Kuththunka Yesamaan Kuththunka, Intha Ponnunkale Ippadithaan Kuthunka", reusing a dialogue from Sigappu Rojakkal (1978). The audio launch was held on 20 April 2012. Reviewing the album, Karthik of Milliblog wrote, "Likeable second effort by Vijay Ebenezer, after Kandaen".

Track listing
No.	Title	Singer(s)	Length
1.	"Angelina"	Krish, Dr. Burn, MILI	4:29
2.	"Ivalunga Imsai Thaanga Mudiyala"	Amitabh Narayan	4:53
3.	"Masala Café"	Rahul Nambiar, Sheeba Truman & Steevevatz	4:21
4.	"Mokkamanusha"	Steevevatz, Suchitra	4:44
5.	"Unnaipattri Unnidame"	Devan Ekambaram, Prashanthini	4:20
6.	"Ava Thirumbipaarthu"	Karthik, Anitha Karthikeyan	4:59
Total length:			27:46

== Release ==
Kalakalappu was released on 11 May 2012, by UTV Motion Pictures. It was released in 255 screens in Tamil Nadu, and was the only Tamil release of the week. Ahead of the film's release, distributors predicted that the film would "work big time at the summer box-office", given the success of numerous comedy films in Tamil cinema released that year.

=== Critical reception ===
M. Suganth of The Times of India claimed that "Kalakalappu remains true to its title and is jolly good fun throughout". Sify's critic described the film as "good fun while it lasts, with the second half better than the first". Anupama Subramanian of Deccan Chronicle wrote, "It's fun and funny, unpretentious and yet quite nutty!". Pavithra Srinivasan of Rediff.com gave it 2.5 out of 5 stars and stated that it did have "its funny moments but only a few of them work". In.com wrote: "Kalakalappu works only in bits and pieces!".

Malathi Rangarajan of The Hindu wrote, "Predictable narrative technique is a bane, and not all attempts at comedy transcend time. Instead [Sundar] should move on, fine-tune his comedic skills and take the viewer on a more advanced and pertinent humour trip". Baradwaj Rangan wrote, "Sundar C fills his lively canvas with a corrupt cop and a villain after missing diamonds, and these discursions occasionally put a brake on the proceedings. Thankfully, the kitchen sink, aka the doting grandfather who flies through a car's windshield, is always round the corner".

=== Box office ===
Trade analysts considered Kalakalappu a success within a week of its release, given the low budget. According to Sify, the film was made on a budget of ₹6.5 crore (equivalent to ₹13 crore or US$1.4 million in 2026), and grossed around ₹11 crore (equivalent to ₹20 crore or US$2.2 million in 2026).

== Legacy ==
The success of Kalakalappu, along with that of other contemporaneous Tamil films such as Kadhalil Sodhappuvadhu Yeppadi, Marina and Oru Kal Oru Kannadi, initiated a short-lived trend of comedy films becoming successful. Trade analyst Sreedhar Pillai noted a shift in Tamil cinema from violent revenge-based films to comedies, which were found to be more commercially viable. Ilavarasu's character and his nickname "Amitabh Mama" became popular, and the subject of internet memes. Kalakalappu was remade in Telugu as Jump Jilani (2014). A spiritual successor titled Kalakalappu 2, also directed by Sundar, was released on 9 February 2018. In November 2024, a third Kalakalappu film was confirmed to be in development; however, as of 2026, it remains in limbo due to legal and financial issues between Sundar and the producer.
