= A. Govindamoorthy =

Indian film director

- Occupations: Director, actor
- Years active: 2007-present

A. Govindamoorthy is an Indian film director and actor who has worked on Tamil films. After making his debut with Karuppusamy Kuththagaithaarar (2007), he has gone on to make Vedigundu Murugesan (2009) and Pappali (2014).

== Career ==
Govindamoorthy dropped out of engineering college after being unable to finance his studies during his third semester and then began reading Vairamuthu's "Sirpi, Unnai Sethukugiraen", which inspired him to become a film maker. After assisting Ezhil and Chimbu Deven, Govindamoorthy then began his film career by directing Karuppusamy Kuththagaithaarar (2007) starring Karan and Meenakshi, and then went on to make Vedigundu Murugesan (2009) with Pasupathy.

In 2013, Govindamurthy approached producer Ambeth Kumar with a script of Pappali (2014), who readily agreed to produce the venture after listening to his narration. He revealed that the team signed on Senthil Kumar and Ishara Nair to work on the film, as the team could not afford bigger stars and could not afford to wait for their dates. The film was released on 2014 went unnoticed and received poor reviews with a critic from Sify.com noting that the film "is a crude and crass comedy laced with sentiments", adding the "film lacks technical finesse and is difficult to sit through".

He debuted as an actor with Marina (2012) and went on to act in many films including Pichaikaaran (2016). Henceforth, he was mostly credited as Pichaikkaran Moorthy or simply Moorthy while acting in films.

== Filmography ==
Director

Year	Film	Notes
2007	Karuppusamy Kuththagaithaarar	
2009	Vedigundu Murugesan	
2014	Pappali	

Actor

- Marina (2012)
- Pichaikkaran (2016)
- Thondan (2017)
- Kolanji (2017)
- Raatchasi (2019)
- Naadodigal 2 (2020)
- Eeswaran (2021)
- Yugi (2022)
- Harkara (2023)
- Fight Club (2023)
- Maharaja (2024)
- Rajakili (2024)
- Thiru. Manickam (2024)
- Kuzhanthaigal Munnetra Kazhagam (2025)
- Lucky The Superstar (2026)
- Nooru Saami (2026)
