= Suchitra =

Indian playback singer

- Born: Suchitra Ramadurai; 14 August 1976 (age 50); Chennai, Tamil Nadu, India
- Other names: RJ Suchi; Mirchi Suchi; Suchi
- Education: Mar Ivanios College; PSG Institute of Management; Le Cordon Bleu
- Occupations: Singer; actress; songwriter; composer; musician; radio jockey; columnist; writer
- Years active: 1993–present
- Spouse: Karthik Kumar (m. 2005–2017)
- Awards: ITFA Best Female Playback Singer; Filmfare Award for Best Female Playback Singer – Telugu
- Musical career
- Genres: Indian classical; Carnatic; filmi; Indian pop
- Instruments: Vocals; guitar

Suchitra Ramadurai, known mononymously as Suchitra, is an Indian radio jockey, popular playback singer, songwriter, composer, voice artist, dubbing artist and film actress. She has sung in multiple languages including Tamil, Malayalam, and Telugu.

== Early life ==
Suchitra was born in Chennai, Tamil Nadu, India, as the daughter of Ramadurai and Padmaja. She has a sister named, Sunitha. Suchitra is a BSc graduate from Mar Ivanios College (Trivandrum). Later on, she moved to Coimbatore for her MBA from PSG Institute of Management. She was part of a music band at PSG.

== Career ==
Suchitra joined Sify for a year, after graduating. She responded to an ad for the post of an RJ in Radio Mirchi. She became as Rj Suchi, with her popular morning show Hello Chennai. Her distinct and bold voice made her very popular with the younger crowd. She still does a radio show called Flight983 on Radio Mirchi, on Sunday evenings (7–9 pm). The show deals with interesting international happenings.

She started singing after a few years as RJ.

Suchitra is now a singer and songwriter as well, composing music on her own and in collaboration with Singer Ranjith. Her YouTube channel 'Suchislife' has all her updated work.

She wrote a short story, a graphic illustration of an episode in the life of a black peppercorn called Kuru-Milaku, called "The Runaway Peppercorn".

== Personal life ==
Suchitra was married to actor Karthik Kumar between 2005 and 2017.

== Filmography ==
=== Actress ===
Year	Film	Role	Notes
2003	Jay Jay	Herself	Guest appearance (RJ)
2004	Aayutha Ezhuthu	Suchitra	
2010	Bale Pandiya	Herself	Guest appearance
2011	Ko	Party Member	Guest appearance

=== Dubbing artist ===
Year	Film	Voice-over for
2005	Anniyan	Herself (As an RJ - Voice only)
2006	Thiruttu Payale	Malavika
2006	Kedi	Tamannaah Bhatia
2008	Poi Solla Porom	Piaa Bajpai
2009	Indira Vizha	Namitha
2009	Kanthaswamy	Shriya Saran
2009	Naan Avan Illai 2	Rachana Maurya
2010	Naanayam	Ramya Raj
2010	Kola Kolaya Mundhirika	Shikha
2011	Mankatha	Lakshmi Rai
2014	Naan Sigappu Manithan	Ineya
2014	Kathai Thiraikathai Vasanam Iyakkam	Akhila Kishore

== Discography ==
=== Studio album ===
Year	Album	Music composer	Lyrics	Label	Notes
1993	Zamaana Dewaana	Rajesh Jhaveri		DC Records	First album released.
1996	Oohalu	Ramani Bharadwaj		Magnasound	Backing Vocal only; First Telugu pop album.
2012	Music I Like			Universal Music Group	

=== Tamil songs ===
Year	Film	Song	Music director	Co-singer(s)
2003	Lesa Lesa	"Enai Polave Kattru"	Harris Jayaraj	K. S. Chitra
2003	Jay Jay	"May Maasam 98'il"	Bharadwaj	
2003	Kaakha Kaakha	"Uyirin Uyire"	Harris Jayaraj	KK
2003	Punnagai Poove	"Siragaagi Ponathae"	Yuvan Shankar Raja	Ganga, Kovai Ranjani
2003	Ottran	"Yeh Thiththippey"	Pravin Mani	Karthik
2004	Manmadhan	"En Aasai Mythiliye"	Yuvan Shankar Raja	Silambarasan
2004	Jai	"Shock Adikkudhu Pennae"	Mani Sharma	Ranjith
2004	Kudaikul Mazhai	"Oru Kottaikkul"	Karthik Raja	Ranjith, Sujatha
2004	Aai	"Aai Mailapuru"	Srikanth Deva	Manikka Vinayagam, Sabesh, Ganga
2004	Aai	"Neathi Adida Aai"	Srikanth Deva	Javed Ali, Palakkad Sreeram, Gopal Sharma, Kumar
2005	Ullam Ketkumae	"Kanavugal"	Harris Jayaraj	Karthik, Tippu, O. S. Arun, Premgi Amaren, Febi Mani, Pop Shalini
2005	Dancer	"Jingulu Jingale"	Pravin Mani	Rafi
2005	Thaka Thimi Tha	"Kanne I Love You"	D. Imman	Mahesh Vinayagam
2005	6′.2″	"Raavanane"	D. Imman	
2005	Englishkaran	"Ghajini Mohammed"	Deva	Karthik
2005	Kundakka Mandakka	"Vattamittu"	Bharadwaj	
2005	Anbe Vaa	“Alek Alek”	D. Imman	
2005	Thavamai Thavamirundhu	"Yenna Paarkkirai"	Sabesh–Murali	Yugendran
2006	Vallavan	"Yammadi Aathadi"	Yuvan Shankar Raja	Silambarasan, T. Rajendar, Mahathi
2006	Pokkiri	"Dole Dole"	Mani Sharma	Ranjith
2006	Pokkiri	"En Chella Peru Apple"	Mani Sharma	A. V. Ramanan
2006	Madrasi	"Kadhal Vaaram Kondata"	D. Imman	Tippu, Ranjith
2006	Azhagai Irukkirai Bayamai Irukkirathu	"Kaadhalai Pirippadhu"	Yuvan Shankar Raja	Bharath, Devan Ekambaram, Premgi Amaren, Ranjith, Pushpavanam Kuppusamy, Yuvan Shankar Raja, Paravai Muniyamma, Sujatha, Naveen
2006	Pachchak Kuthira	"Sarasa Loga"	Sabesh–Murali	Karthik, Chinmayi, Pop Shalini, Vindhya
2006	Yuga	"Oolala Olala"	Dhina	Dev Prakash, Harish Raghavendra
2006	Boys and Girls	"Vasiyam Vasiyam"	Sirpy	
2006	Nee Venunda Chellam	"Kallathoni"	Dhina	Karthik
2006	Kedi	"Unna Petha Aatha"	Yuvan Shankar Raja	Jassie Gift
2006	Dharmapuri	"Vandha Vaadi"	Srikanth Deva	Perarasu
2007	Vel	"Ottraikannale"	Yuvan Shankar Raja	Haricharan
2007	Polladhavan	"Alibaba Thangam"	G. V. Prakash Kumar	
2007	Marudhamalai	"Hey Yenmama"	D. Imman	Karthik
2007	Kaalai	"Kutti Pisaase"	G. V. Prakash Kumar	Silambarasan
2007	Nanbanin Kadhali	"Osthava"	Deva	
2007	Thiru Ranga	"Thagathimi"	Srikanth Deva	
2007	Nee Naan Nila	"Maathu Maathu"	Dhina	Timmy, Dhina
2007	Pirappu	"Ithu Thaana Kaathal Mazhai"	Bharadwaj	Sathyan, Priya Himesh
2007	Aarya	"Aarya"	Mani Sharma	Karthik
2007	Tholaipesi	"Enna Venum"	S. Shanthakumar	
2007	Cheena Thaana 001	"Poruki"	Deva	
2007	Piragu	"Kitavaada Kitavaada"	Srikanth Deva	
2007	Pasupathi c/o Rasakkapalayam	"Naan Major"	Deva	
2007	Mirugam	"Vaargona Vaargona"	Sabesh–Murali	Mahalakshmi Iyer, Chinnaponnu
2008	Yaaradi Nee Mohini	"Nenjai Kasakki"	Yuvan Shankar Raja	Udit Narayan
2008	Yaaradi Nee Mohini	"Paalakattu" (D. Imman Mix)	D. Imman	Haricharan, Vinaya
2008	Dhaam Dhoom	"Pudhu Pudhu"	Harris Jayaraj	Benny Dayal, Guna
2008	Pazhani	"Locku Locku"	Srikanth Deva	Perarasu
2008	Indiralohathil Na Azhagappan	"Malika Cherovatra"	Sabesh–Murali	Anuradha Sriram, Jassie Gift
2008	Sila Nerangalil	"Chella Phonai"	Srikanth Deva	
2008	Inbaa	"Kabul Nattu"	P. B. Balaji	
2008	Kannum Kannum	"Pathinettu Vayasu"	Dhina	
2008	Azhagu Nilayam	"Hey Azhan Kuzan"	Sabesh–Murali	
2008	Azhagu Nilayam	"Hey Othum Chinnam"	Sabesh–Murali	Anuradha Sriram
2008	Arasangam	"Ko Kuruvi"	Srikanth Deva	Hemambika
2008	Nepali	"Anaikindra Dhaagam"	Srikanth Deva	Karthik, Bombay Jayashree
2008	Pandi	"Kuthu Madhippa"	Srikanth Deva	Benny Dayal
2008	Kathavarayan	"Oru Haiku"	Srikanth Deva	Tippu
2008	Thenavattu	"Enakkena Pirandhavalo"	Srikanth Deva	Karthik, Arun
2008	Ellam Avan Seyal	"Ada Ada Sema Sema"	Vidyasagar	Ranjith
2008	Kodaikanal	"Suvaiyanadhu Suvaiyanadhu"	Deva	Timmy
2008	Thiruvannamalai	"Adiyae"	Srikanth Deva	Udit Narayan
2009	Silambattam	"Vechikkava"	Yuvan Shankar Raja	Silambarasan
2009	Sindhanai Sei	"Naa Kaakinaada"	S. Thaman	
2009	Eeram	"Tharai Erangiya"	S. Thaman	
2009	Kanthaswamy	"Excuse Me"	Devi Sri Prasad	Vikram
2009	Moscowin Kavery	"Gore Gore"	S. Thaman	Karthik
2009	Moscowin Kavery	"Then Muttham"	S. Thaman	Naresh Iyer
2009	Vettaikaaran	"Oru Chinna Thamarai"	Vijay Antony	Krish, Dinesh Kanagaratnam
2009	A Aa E Ee	"Mena Minuki"	Vijay Antony	Vijay Antony, Surmukhi Raman, Sangeetha Rajeshwaran
2009	Laadam	"Atlantic Ocean"	Dharan	
2009	Adada Enna Azhagu	"Kummu Kummu"	T. M. Jayamurugan & Jeevan Thomas	Tippu, Kalyani
2009	Enga Raasi Nalla Raasi	"Vaaya Vaaya"	Deva	Prasanna
2009	Ragavan	"Ooththura"	Gangai Amaran	Premgi Amaren
2009	Gnabagangal	"Kadalil"	James Vick	Karthik
2009	Sirithal Rasipen	"Kanadicha Rosapoo"	Iniyavan	Benny Dayal
2009	Kandhakottai	"Dishyum Dishyum"	Dhina	Shankar Mahadevan
2010	Siddhu +2	"Naan Alana Thamarai"	Dharan	Venkat Prabhu, Srimathumitha
2010	Goa	"Goa"	Yuvan Shankar Raja	Krish, Ranjith, Tanvi Shah, Chynk Showtyme, Pav Bundy
2010	Kola Kolaya Mundhirika	"Notta Kudu"	V. Selvaganesh	
2010	Singam	"En Idhayam"	Devi Sri Prasad	Tippu
2010	Mundhinam Paartheney	"Pesum Poove"	S. Thaman	Krish
2010	Mundhinam Paartheney	"Kanavena"	S. Thaman	Haricharan
2010	Mundhinam Paartheney	"Mun Dhinam Paarthen"	S. Thaman	S. Thaman
2010	Aridhu Aridhu	"Oh Lalali"	S. Thaman	
2010	Thillalangadi	"Pootta Paathadhum"	S. Thaman	
2010	Manmadan Ambu	"Oyyale"	Devi Sri Prasad	Mukesh Mohamed
2010	Thunichal	"Kalapayalae"	Premgi Amaren	
2010	Thunichal	"Neer Vaanam"	Premgi Amaren	Yugendran
2010	Jaggubhai	"Acham, Madam"	Rafee	
2010	Sivappu Mazhai	"Unarchigalai"	Deva	Srikanth Deva
2010	Guru Sishyan	"Kettaley Kettaley (Vangona)"	Dhina	
2010	Kadhalagi	"Vaazhvomay Vaazhvomay"	A. R. Reihana	Kavi Suresh
2010	Mandabam	"Patha Vikkava"	Iniya Mahesan	
2010	Drohi	"Adi Kutti Maa"	V. Selvaganesh	Ranjith, KK, Maya Sricharan
2010	Gowravargal	"Nandu Pudi"	Dhina	Rahul Nambiar
2010	Thottupaar	"Oolavediye"	Srikanth Deva	Silambarasan
2011	Siruthai	"Rakkamma Rakku"	Vidyasagar	Ranjith, Roshan
2011	Kaavalan	"Yaaradu"	Vidyasagar	Karthik
2011	Avan Ivan	"Dia Dia Dole"	Yuvan Shankar Raja	
2011	Mankatha	"Vaada Bin Laada"	Yuvan Shankar Raja	Krish
2011	7 Aum Arivu	"Oh Ringa Ringa"	Harris Jayaraj	Benny Dayal, Roshan, Jerry John
2011	Venghai	"Pudikale Pudikudhu"	Devi Sri Prasad	Mukesh Mohamed
2011	Rajapattai	"Laddu Laddu"	Yuvan Shankar Raja	Vikram, Priyadharshini
2011	Aadu Puli	"Thodugiral"	Sundar C. Babu	Jyostsna
2011	Kandaen	"Narmada"	Vijay Ebenezer	Haricharan
2011	Udhayan	"Ring Ting"	Manikanth Kadri	Baba Sehgal
2011	Sagakkal	"Kandaangi Selai"	Thayarathnam	Ananthu
2011	Vithagan	"Un Zone La"	Joshua Sridhar	Sayanora Philip
2012	Vilayada Vaa	"Thottadhu Thottadhu Vettriyagum"	Srimurali	Ranjith, Rap Biggnickk
2012	Kalakalappu	"Mokkamanusha"	Vijay Ebenezer	Steevevatz
2012	Mirattal	"Radio Radio"	Pravin Mani	Shankar Mahadevan
2012	Maattrraan	"Theeyae Theeyae"	Harris Jayaraj	Franko, Aalap Raju, Charulatha Mani, Sathyan
2012	Podaa Podi	"Maattikittenae"	Dharan	Naresh Iyer, Benny Dayal
2012	Kanna Laddu Thinna Aasaiya	"Ye Unnathan"	S. Thaman	Ranjith, Naveen, Rahul Nambiar
2012	Samar	"Oru Kannil Vaegam"	Yuvan Shankar Raja	Ranjith, Naveen
2012	Kantha	"Sathuryam Pesathada"	Shakthi R. Selva	
2012	Nanda Nanditha	"Iyya Rasa"	Emil Mohammed	Naveen
2012	Aathi Narayana	"Twinkle Twinkle"	Srikanth Deva	Karthik
2012	Thiruthani	"Raja Raja Chozha"	Perarasu	
2012	Vavval Pasanga	"Poo Methu Vazhum"	Jerome Pushparaj	
2012	Vavval Pasanga	"Vaa Machi"	Jerome Pushparaj	
2013	Settai	"Arjuna Arjuna"	S. Thaman	Karthik
2013	Baadshah	"Diamond Girl"	S. Thaman	Silambarasan
2013	Vanakkam Chennai	"Ailasa Ailasa"	Anirudh Ravichander	
2013	Puthagam	"Say That You Love Me"	James Vasanthan	Prasad
2013	Karuppampatti	"Kannamma Chinna Ponnamma"	Kannan	Priya, Thilaka, Anitha
2013	Karuppampatti	"Karupampatti Karupampatti"	Kannan	Naveen, Mukesh Mohamed
2013	Azhagan Azhagi	"Ethu Varai Vanam"	Kannan	Priya
2013	Gouravam	"Ondraai Ondraai"	S. Thaman	Haricharan
2013	Pattathu Yaanai	"Thalakaal Puriyala"	S. Thaman	Shankar Mahadevan
2013	Summa Nachunu Irukku	"Kannan Indru"	Achu Rajamani	
2013	Ya Ya	"Neethane Endru"	Vijay Ebenezer	Krish
2014	Ninaithathu Yaaro	"Kadhal Oru"	X.Paulraj	Jassie Gift
2014	Ninaithathu Yaaro	"Kairegai" (Remix)	X.Paulraj	Hyde Karty, Sylvester, Jassie Gift
2014	Naan Than Bala	"Eruna Rayiluthan"	Venkat Krishi	Haricharan
2014	Irumbu Kuthirai	"Hello Brother"	G. V. Prakash Kumar	Ranjith, Chinnaponnu
2014	Poriyaalan	"Haryana Devathaikku"	M. S. Jones Rupert	
2015	Pulan Visaranai 2	"Karuppo Sivappo"	Joshua Sridhar	Swarnalatha
2015	Kadavul Paathi Mirugam Paathi	"Meenamma Meenamma"	Rahul Raj	
2016	Narathan	"My Name Is Chandhrika"	Mani Sharma	Senthildass Velayutham, Narendhran
2016	Manal Kayiru 2	"Rajathi Rajan"	Dharan	Ashwin Shekar
2016	Thozha	"Eiffel Mele"	Gopi Sundar	Ranjith
2016	Idhu Namma Aalu	"Maaman Waiting"	Kuralarasan	T. Rajendar
2017	Motta Shiva Ketta Shiva	"Lo Lo Lo Local"	Amresh Ganesh	Raghava Lawrence
2017	Motta Shiva Ketta Shiva	"Motta Paiyyan Paiyyan"	Amresh Ganesh	Raghava Lawrence
2017	Valla Desam	"Edho Edho Ennam"	L. V. Muthukumarasamy & R. K. Sundar	
2018	Bhaagamathie	"Theme Song"	S. Thaman	
2018	Iruttu Araiyil Murattu Kuththu	"IAMK Party Song"	Balamurali Balu	Adithya Surendar, Teejay Arunasalam, Vishnupriya Ravi
2019	Sathru	"Neram Indha Neram"	Amresh Ganesh	Tippu

=== Telugu songs ===
Year	Film	Song	Music director
2005	Athadu	"Adharaka", "Chandamama"	Mani Sharma
2006	Ranam	"Cheli Jabilee"	Mani Sharma
2006	Pokiri	"Dole Dole"	Mani Sharma
2006	Pokiri	"Ippati Kinka"	Mani Sharma
2006	Happy	"Ossa Re"	Yuvan Shankar Raja
2007	Chirutha	"Maro Maro"	Mani Sharma
2007	Maisamma IPS	"Naa Peru Mumaith Khan"	M. M. Srilekha
2009	Mallanna (D)	"Excuse Me"	Devi Sri Prasad
2009	Kasko	"Telusa Telusa"	Premgi Amaren
2010	Adhurs	"Pilla Naa Valla Kaadu"	Devi Sri Prasad
2010	Yamudu (D)	"Ee Hridayam"	Devi Sri Prasad
2010	Puli	"Maham Maye"	A. R. Rahman
2010	Brindavanam	"Nijamena"	Thaman
2010	Manmadha Baanam (D)	"Uyyala"	Devi Sri Prasad
2011	Shakti	"Surro Surra"	Mani Sharma
2011	Dhada	"Ye Pilla Pilla"	Devi Sri Prasad
2011	Vaishali (D)	"Kurivippina"	Thaman
2011	Kandireega	"Champakamala"	Thaman
2011	Aakasame Haddu	"Karo Karo"	Anand
2011	Oosaravelli	"Dandiya India"	Devi Sri Prasad
2011	7th Sense (D)	"Oh Ringa Ringa"	Harris Jayaraj
2011	Veedinthe (D)	"Laddu Laddu"	Yuvan Shankar Raja
2012	Businessman	"Sir Osthara"	Thaman
2012	Sashesham	"Chupultho Maatlade"	K.C. Mouli
2012	Devudu Chesina Manushulu	"Disturb Chettanade"	Raghu Kunche
2012	Nuvva Nena	"Ayomayam"	Bheems Ceciroleo
2013	Naayak	"Nellorae"	Thaman
2013	Mirchi	"Barbie Girl"	Devisri Prasad
2013	Baadshah	"Diamond Girl"	Thaman
2013	Ramayya Vasthavayya	"Kurreyadu"	S. Thaman
2013	Love Cycle	"Pandaga"	Agastya
2015	Srimanthudu	"Jatha Kalise"	Devi Sri Prasad
2018	Bhaagamathie	"Theme song"	Thaman
2019	Okate Life	"Whatsapp Baby" "Ohh Meri Dhimtak Nari"	Amresh Ganesh

=== Other languages ===
Year	Film	Song	Language	Music director
2007	Krishna	"Thaiyya Thaiyya"	Kannada	V. Harikrishna
2008	Citizen	"Mariyade Mariyade"	Kannada	Vandemataram Srinivas
2010	Pokkiri Raja	"Chenthenkin"	Malayalam	Jassie Gift
2012	Grandmaster	"Aaraanu Nee"	Malayalam	Deepak Dev
2012	Trivandrum Lodge	"Theyyaram"	Malayalam	M. Jayachandran
2013	Silk Sakkath Hot	"Undadi Gundamma"	Kannada	Jassie Gift
2013	Soori Gang	"Welcome"	Kannada	S. Nagu
2015	Katte	"Venkteshwara"	Kannada	S. A. Rajkumar
2015	Bangalore 560023	"Madhuvana"	Kannada	Arun Andrews
2016	Bhale Jodi	"Hello Hello"	Kannada	Sadhu Kokila

== Television ==
Year	Show	Channel	Role	Language	Notes
2006	Koffee with Suchi	Star Vijay	Host	Tamil	
2014	Music India	Asianet	Judge	Malayalam	
2015	4th South Indian International Movie Awards	Sun TV	Host	Tamil	Co-hosted with Shiva
2020	Bigg Boss Tamil 4	Star Vijay	Contestant	Tamil	Wildcard Contestant, Evicted Day 49
2020	Bigg Boss Telugu 4	Star Maa	Guest	Telugu	Crossover episode with Bigg Boss Tamil; Fearless Award

== Awards ==
Suchitra Ramadurai (also known as RJ Suchi) is an Indian radio jockey, playback singer, and author who has made significant contributions to literature. Her short story, The Runaway Peppercorn (published by Tulika Books), was a winning entry in the 2003–2004 Commonwealth Short Story Competition, a prestigious international award administered by the Commonwealth Foundation. She received further recognition in the 2005–2006 edition of the same competition for her story Chinna and Muthu. Beyond her success in short fiction, she has authored condensed versions of Shakespearean plays, including Hamlet and Macbeth, and has worked as a columnist. In the entertainment industry, she is a prolific playback singer with over 100 recorded songs in Tamil, Telugu, and Malayalam cinema, and gained widespread fame as a radio jockey for Radio Mirchi in Chennai.

International Tamil Film Awards (ITFA)

- 2011 - Best Female Playback Singer – Mankatha

BIG Telugu Music Awards

- 2012 - Best Singer of the Year – Businessman

Filmfare Awards South

- 2012 - Filmfare Award for Best Female Playback Singer – Telugu for the song 'Sir Osthara' from Businessman
- 2010 - Nominated: Filmfare Award for Best Female Playback Singer – Telugu for the song 'Nijamena' from Brindavanam

2nd South Indian International Movie Awards

- 2012 - Nominated: SIIMA Award for Best Female Playback Singer – Telugu for the song 'Sir Osthara' from Businessman
