= Bale Pandiya (2010 film) =

2010 film by Siddharth Chandrasekhar

- Theatrical release poster
- Directed by: Siddharth Chandrasekhar
- Written by: Siddharth Chandrasekhar
- Produced by: Kalpathi S. Aghoram; Kalpathi S. Ganesh; Kalpathi S. Suresh
- Starring: Vishnu Vishal; Piaa Bajpai
- Cinematography: Soundarrajan
- Edited by: Shiva Saravanan
- Music by: Devan Ekambaram
- Production company: AGS Entertainment
- Release date: 3 September 2010
- Running time: 140 minutes
- Country: India
- Language: Tamil

Bale Pandiya (transl. Bravo Pandiya) is a 2010 Indian Tamil-language romantic action comedy film written and directed by Siddharth Chandrasekhar in his debut. It stars Vishnu Vishal and Piaa Bajpai in the lead roles. The film was released on 3 September 2010.

== Plot ==
Contract killer AKP and his two sidekicks arrive at a club. The group walks into the club and starts showing their power before reaching their table. A finger with a ring is placed on the table. Pandiyan considers himself unlucky. All his efforts to come up in life end on the wrong side. He approaches AKP and urges to kill him. A shocked AKP is initially hesitant. Soon, he decides to give him some time. Hence, he gives Pandiyan some money and entrusts him with the job of turning a human bomb, a job that he should execute within 20 days.

Life changes for Pandiyan after he meets Vaishnavi. They fall in love with each other. When Pandiyan decides to go tell AKP that he would rather prefer to live, he gets a rude shock: AKP and his men are found murdered. The blame falls on Pandiyan. Meanwhile, Vaishnavi gets kidnapped by a gang for a big deal. It is chaos and confusion everywhere, before Pandiyan sets things right.

== Cast ==
- Vishnu Vishal as Pandiyan
- Piaa Bajpai as Vaishnavi
- R. Amarendran as AKP
- Vivek as London
- Gibran Osman as Kachitham
- Pandu as Astrologer
- Jayaprakash as Vannaiyar
- John Vijay as Pasupathy
- Gokulnath
- Cell Murugan as Thirupathi
- Mime Gopi as AKP's henchman
- Dr. Sharmila as Pandiya's mother
- Aarthi as Pandiya's sister-in-law
- Appukutty as Car owner
- Vijay Sethupathi as Pandiya's brother
- Gadam Kishan as Raju
- G. Marimuthu as Ekambaram (uncredited)
- Rangammal as bag thief (uncredited)

Guest appearances in "Happy" song (in alphabetical order)

- Aalap Raju
- Anuradha Sriram
- Devan Ekambaram
- Divya Vijay
- Haricharan
- Japan Kumar
- K. J. Yesudas
- Malaysia Vasudevan
- Malgudi Subha
- Manikka Vinayagam
- Megha
- Mukesh Mohamed
- Naresh Iyer
- Naveen Madhav
- Paravai Muniyamma
- Rahul Nambiar
- Ranjith
- Raqueeb Alam
- S. P. Balasubrahmanyam
- Shaan Rahman
- Srinivas
- Suchitra
- Sundar
- Swetha Mohan
- Velmurugan
- Vijay Yesudas

== Production ==
The film marked the directorial debut of leading advertising designer Siddharth Chandrasekhar. The filming was held at Chennai, Phuket and Pondicherry.

== Soundtrack ==
The soundtrack was composed by Devan Ekambaram. The a cappella song "Happy" includes over 20 singers. It is the last song sung by Malaysia Vasudevan before his death in 2011. The audio launch was held at Sathyam Cinemas in April 2010.

Track listing
No.	Title	Lyrics	Singers	Length
1.	"Sirikkiren"	Vaali	Naresh Iyer, Mano, Sirkazhi G. Sivachidambaram, Burn, Uma Shankar	5:05
2.	"Happy"	Vaali	Malaysia Vasudevan, Haricharan, Devan Ekambaram, Naresh Iyer, Naveen Madhav, Ranjith, Rahul Nambiar, Paravai Muniamma, Manicka Vinayagam, Anuradha Sriram, Srinivas, Mukesh, Divya, Suchitra, Velmurugan, Malgudi Subha, Vijay Yesudas, Aalap Raju	4:59
3.	"Aaradha Kobamillai"	Thamarai	Raman Mahadevan, Mahalakshmi Iyer	4:48
4.	"Ivan Thedal"	Dr. Burn	Dr. Burn, Arun Ramamurthi	3:39
5.	"Kangalae Kamalalayam"	Thamarai	P. Unnikrishnan, Mrinalini	4:06
6.	"Bale Pandiya"	Vaali	Velmurugan, Ranjith, Naresh Iyer	4:27
7.	"Sirikkiren" (Instrumental)		Arun Ramamurthi	5:05
Total length:				31:29

== Critical reception ==
Pavithra Srinivasan of Rediff.com wrote, "Sidharth Chandrasekar's debut film hits the right note at certain places, and it certainly has its funny moments. If it had sustained that momentum in the second half, Bale Pandiya would have been even better". Sify mentioned, "The trouble with Bale Pandiya is that the director just do not know whether to make a spoof or a comedy with songs and action, in the process he falls between two stools" and called it "half baked and contrived". The New Indian Express wrote, "A promising effort from a debutant filmmaker, 'Bale Pandiya' is light-hearted entertainer, sustains its pace, and makes for easy viewing". Bhama Devi Ravi of The Times of India rated the film 2 stars out of 5, saying it "tries hard to be a laugh riot and an engaging entertainer and succeeds in parts".
