= Kandaen =

2011 Indian Tamil romantic comedy

- Theatrical release poster
- Directed by: A. C. Mugil
- Written by: A. C. Mugil
- Produced by: TCS
- Starring: Shanthanu Bhagyaraj; Rashmi Gautam; Santhanam
- Cinematography: Prashanth D'Misale
- Edited by: Ruben
- Music by: Vijay Ebenezer
- Production company: Sri Sivaselvanayakiamman Movies
- Release date: 20 May 2011
- Running time: 132 minutes
- Country: India
- Language: Tamil

Kandaen (transl. I Saw) is a 2011 Indian Tamil-language romantic comedy film written and directed by Mugil, and produced by TCS. It stars Shanthanu Bhagyaraj and Rashmi Gautam in lead along with Santhanam, Vijayakumar and Ashish Vidyarthi in pivotal roles. The film, which was launched in May 2010, created curiosity after noted film-maker Gautham Vasudev Menon's newly launched audio label selected the film's soundtrack to be its first release. It was released on 20 May 2011.

== Plot ==
Vasanth is an engineer who comes from Chennai. One day, he goes to visit his grandfather who claims to be ill. When he arrives at his hometown, he finds that a marriage has been arranged for him and that his grandfather isn't really ill. To escape from the marriage, he lies, saying that he is in love with a girl. The grandfather wants to see the girl as soon as possible, and Vasanth returns to Chennai.

Vasanth falls in love with a pretty girl named Narmada at first sight. He acts blind and she eventually falls for him, too. They start dating and Narmadha's father, a police commissioner, gets his daughter's love. He refuses, not wanting to marry his only daughter to a blind man. The pair decide that they will marry at the register office, without the consent of their parents. During the proceedings of the marriage, Narmada finds out that Vasanth isn't actually blind. She is angered and leaves the registrar's office, but later forgives him after he apologizes. Narmada's father finally agrees to their marriage, and the two get engaged. In the light of the engagement, Vasanth celebrates with his friends to a night in a bar. They get drunk, and Vasanth has a fight with a gang of thugs whom he had a fight earlier once when they misbehaved to Narmada. In the fight, he gets hit by an iron rod on the back of his head, damaging his optical nerves and losing his eyesight.

The doctor convinces him that there are laser treatments to get his eyesight back. She says that he has to undergo an operation but he has to wait until the head wound heals, and also that the surgeon will have to come from London. She tells him to rest and asks Vasanth's friend Saami to take care of him. Vasanth is then discharged from the hospital, but he tells the doctor not to tell anybody about his blindness before he leaves. Then one day, Narmada and her father suddenly come home with her father's friend Shankar. Narmadha's father says that he would not have accepted Vasanth had he been blind, and Vasanth and his friend realise that they cannot know that Vasanth is blind. Vasanth wants to tell Narmada that he is blind, but she gets angry when he mentions blindness. She tells him that she is glad he was only pretending to be blind, as living with a blind person would be extremely hard. Feeling down, Vasanth doesn't tell her about his accident.

One day, while crossing a road, Vasanth asks a girl for help. Narmada sees this and misunderstands that he is cheating on her as it looks like the similar to their first meeting, when Vasanth pretended to be blind. Narmadha's father learns of this. He gets Saami arrested and decides to marry Narmada off to another boy on the same marriage date, but she asks for a break and says that she wants to go to London to study. Saami comes out bail and finds this. Also, the ophthalmologist who's coming from London for Vasanth's operation had his flight cancelled. So Vasanth, along with his doctor in Chennai, boards the flight to London – on which Narmada is also travelling. Another coincidence occurs when the air hostess is the same girl who had helped Vasanth cross the road earlier. She tries to warn the air-hostess, saying that he deceives girls by pretending to be blind. The air hostess, on the other hand, manages to tell Narmada the truth and she learns of Vasanth's blindness. They reconcile, and as the movie comes to an end, Vasanth has a successful operation and they happily return to India to get married.

== Cast ==
- Shanthnoo Bhagyaraj as Vasanth
- Rashmi Gautam as Narmada
- Santhanam as Saami
- Vijayakumar as Vasanth's grandfather
- Ashish Vidyarthi as Narmada's father
- Nellai Siva as Police officer
- Muthukaalai as Narmada's servant
- Nirmala Shrimal as Air Hostess Darshana
- Boys Rajan as Dr. Padmanabhan
- Cool Suresh as Rowdy
- Robert in a special appearance in the song "Narmada"
- Dr. Burn in a special appearance in the song "Enge En Idhayam"

== Soundtrack ==
The score and soundtrack of Kanden are composed by noted evangelical composer, Vijay Ebenezer, who made his debut into film music with the project. The audio rights of Kanden were bought by Gautham Vasudev Menon after he received a copy following the recommendation of actress Sangeetha and producer Sebastian. Menon impressed, wanted to release the audio under his newly launched label, Photon Kathaas Music. Krish made his debut as a lyricist with this film writing two songs. The launch of Menon's banner and the film's album was held on 9 December 2010. The following a day, a promotional event was held at Odyssey in Chennai.

Track listing
No.	Title	Lyrics	Singer(s)	Length
1.	"Enge En Idhayam"	Thamarai	Dr. Burn, Krish, Prashanthini
2.	"Oru Paaravai"	Krish	Krish, Gurupriya
3.	"Narmada"	Krish	Haricharan, Suchitra
4.	"Ninaivugal"	Ravindran	Devan Ekambaram
5.	"Aa Hah"	Thamarai	Krish, Ujjayinee
6.	"Yavarakum Thalaivan"	Vaali	Chinmayi, Senthildass Velayutham
7.	"Cassanova"	Ravindran	Rahul Nambiar, Samcy, Sheeba

== Reception ==
A critic from The New Indian Express wrote, "A romantic comedy with it's [sic] genuine fun moments, few and far between, Kandein is an average fare". Malathi Rangarajan of The Hindu wrote, "Shantanu and the ever-helpful screen pal of the hero, Santhanam, make Kandaen (U) a refreshing treat for the holiday season".
