= Karuppusamy Kuththagaithaarar =

- DVD cover
- Directed by: A. Govindamoorthy
- Written by: A. Govindamoorthy
- Produced by: Sethu; D.Gopinath; Dheeraj Kher; R.Balasubramaniam; Vineet Gogiya
- Starring: Karan; Meenakshi; Vadivelu
- Cinematography: J. Sridhar
- Edited by: S. Shathish
- Music by: Dhina
- Release date: 14 May 2007
- Running time: 150 minutes
- Country: India
- Language: Tamil

Karuppusamy Kuththagaithaarar, also known simply as Karuppusamy, is a 2007 Indian Tamil-language masala film written and directed by A. Govindamoorthy. It stars Karan, Meenakshi and Vadivelu. The film had an average run at the box office.

== Plot ==
Karuppusamy (Karan), is a happy go lucky guy in Madurai who is a small time contractor for a cycle stand. He also takes part in stage shows with his friends during temple festivals. Raasathi (Meenakshi), is a first year medical college student who meets Karuppusamy frequently while parking her cycle in the stand managed by Karuppusamy. Raasathi is very fond of her mother, who died when she was young. Raasathi gets attracted towards Karuppusamy as his acts reminds her of her late mother. Raasathi proposes Karuppusamy and requests him to be with her, so that she feels that her mother lives with her in the form of Karuppusamy. Karuppusamy, although reluctant at initial stages, agrees to Raasathi.

Parallel narration is the comedy track of Padithurai Pandi (Vadivelu), a fraud who cheats others of their money using various comedic attempts with his 2 goons.

Meanwhile, there is Sakthi Kumar who frequently follows Raasathi, but she gets furious seeing him. Raasathi's father finds out about her love for Karuppusamy and gets furious. Now, all her family members are united after a long gap citing this love issue. It is revealed that Sakthi Kumar is Raasathi's cousin brother. A small flashback is shown where, Raasathi's uncles were ruthless money lenders in Madurai. As they were very strict in money lending, they had a huge list of enemies as well. One of such enemies wanted to take revenge on Raasathi's family and in the event, Raasathi's mother gets accidentally killed. This makes Raasathi's father abandon his family and moves alone with Raasathi.

Coming to present, Raasathi's family members are now united and they oppose her love for Karuppusamy. Karuppusamy meets Raasathi's father and tries to convince him, but in vain. Raasathi's family members lock her up in a room and decides to stop her education. Karuppusamy gets furious and requests them to send her to college, as he wanted her to continue her passion of becoming a doctor. Raasathi's family members agree to send her to college but with a condition that Karuppusamy should never meet her. Karuppusamy agrees and Raasathi resumes her education now.

But secretly, Raasathi's family members plan for her wedding and her wedding is arranged without her knowledge itself. When Karuppusamy finds out this, he gets angry and goes to Raasathi's house. He bashes all the goons and takes Raasathi with him. Karuppusamy scolds Raasathi's family members for not keeping up their words. Karuppusamy also promises that he will support Raasathi's education and help her fulfill her dream. Raasathi goes with Karuppusamy.

== Cast ==
- Karan as Karuppusamy
- Meenakshi as Raasathi
  - Venba as Young Raasathi
- Vadivelu as 'Padithurai' Paandi
- Shankar
- King Kong
- Halwa Vasu
- Chaams
- Vijai Kaartik
- "Kalakka Povadhu Yaaru" Venkatesh as Ezharai
- Sakthi Kumar as Raasathi's brother
- Bava Lakshmanan
- Karnaa Radha
- Sumathi as Lady robber
- Shobana as Karuppusamy's mother

== Production ==
The film marked the directorial debut of Govindamoorthy, who earlier assisted Sasi, S. Ezhil and Chimbu Deven.

== Soundtrack ==
The soundtrack was composed by Dhina.

No.	Song	Singers	Lyrics
1.	"Kaadhal Enbathu"	O. S. Arun, Harish Raghavendra, Malgudi Subha, Dhina, Dev Prakash	Vijay Sagar
2.	"Karuppan Varuvan"	Shankar Mahadevan, Jayamoorthy	Yugabharathi
3.	"Naalu Gopuram"	Chinnaponnu, Tippu	Yugabharathi
4.	"Oorellam"	Hariharan	Yugabharathi
5.	"Sangam Vaithu"	Dhina, Kavi, Karthik, Sangeetha Rajeshwaran	Yugabharathi
6.	"Uppu Kallu"	Bombay Jayashree	Yugabharathi

== Critical reception ==
Malini Mannath of Chennai Online wrote, "The debutant director (apprenticed under directors Sasi and Simbudevan) has kept the proceedings alive and engaging for the most part. The film lags a little towards the second half where the songs are thrust in. But it peps up again towards the end where Karuppusamy takes on his detractors in an adrenalin-flowing finish". Lajjavathi of Kalki praised the acting of Karan and Meenakshi, Vadivelu's humour, Sridhar's cinematography and concluded saying Moorthy takes notice in his debut directorial for showing men of the soil as blood and flesh while calling this film as milestone for Karan. Sify wrote, "On the downside, the film sags towards the interval point as the director tries to give it a typical Madurai look with lots of unwanted sentiments. There is also too many songs that pop in spoiling the narrative. Still Karupusamy Kuthagaitharar is the best of the Madurai stories that have come out in recent times". S. R. Ashok Kumar of The Hindu wrote, "This Friends Cinema production has all the ingredients to make it a box office hit. A love tale, it is bolstered by comedy and good music".
