= Vedigundu Murugesan =

- Poster
- Directed by: A. Govindamoorthy
- Produced by: M. Senthil Kumar, P.S. Ganesh
- Starring: Pasupathy; Jyothirmayi; Vadivelu
- Cinematography: Bala Bharani
- Edited by: Praveen K. L. N. B. Srikanth
- Music by: Dhina
- Release date: 17 July 2009
- Country: India
- Language: Tamil

Vedigundu Murugesan (transl. Bomb Murugesan) is a 2009 Indian Tamil-language comedy film directed by A. Govindamoorthy. It stars Pasupathy, Jyothirmayi and Vadivelu. The music was composed by Dhina with cinematography by Bala Bharani. The film released on 17 July 2009.

== Plot ==
The movie is set in the village of Kizhrajakularaman in Rajapalayam Taluka. Vedigundu Murugesan is a small-time guy who breaks the law occasionally but is a Good Samaritan in the eyes of the local judge as he provides shelter and looks after a mentally challenged girl named Ponni, who was deserted by her parents. Murugesan earns his living fetching water for factories and hotels in his village. A lady constable named Nachiyar, who rubs Murugesan the wrong way, falls in love with him due to his humanitarian nature and the will to help others. Soon, Ponni is raped by one of the baddies, leading to the final climax in the hospital. Parallel narration is the comedy track of Alert Aarumugam, a petty and clever thief.

== Cast ==
- Pasupathy as Murugesan
- Jyothirmayi as Constable Nachiyar
- Vadivelu as Alert Aarumugam
- Thyagu as "Kandhu Vatti" Kanthan
- Deepa Shankar as Ponni
- A. Govindamoorthy as Prisoner(Cameo appearance)
- Nirmala Periyasamy as Judge
- Raneesh as Kodanchan
- Veera as Ganesh
- Karnaa Radha

== Soundtrack ==
Music was composed by Dhina.

Song	Singers	Lyrics
"Manjapattu"	Malathy, Senthildass Velayutham	Eknath
"Neenda Thooram" I	Vijay Yesudas	Yugabharathi
"Neenda Thooram" II	Bombay Jayashree	Yugabharathi
"Rottoram"	Pasupathy, Dhina, Velmurugan, Grace Karunas, Vadivelu Ganeshan, Pichai Arasu, Hemambiga, Moorthi, Bhava Lakshmanan	Yugabharathi
"Sarale Sarale"	Madhu Balakrishnan, Madhushree	Yugabharathi
"Seenicheevu Sivappukari"	Shankar Mahadevan, Darshana KT	Yugabharathi

== Critical reception ==
Rediff.com wrote, "Despite its many failings and loop-holes, Vedigundu Murugesan does work at times chiefly because the climax and screenplay try to rise above the ordinary". The New Indian Express wrote, "Morthy hasn't chosen a new storyline but he has given a different treatment to the story. He has consciously laced the narrative with satire. He has conceived some hilarious moments". The Hindu wrote, "The film has a pretty poignant line, which could have made for more interesting viewing, had writer-director Murthy worked harder on the narration".
