= Neelam Upadhyaya =

Indian actress

- Born: 5 October 1993 (age 32); Mumbai, Maharashtra, India
- Education: Smt. M.M.K College of Commerce & Economics
- Occupation: Actress
- Years active: 2012–2015
- Spouse: Siddharth Chopra (m. 2025)
- Relatives: Priyanka Chopra (sister-in-law)

Neelam Upadhyaya (born 5 October 1993) is an Indian actress who has appeared in Tamil and Telugu films.

== Personal life ==
Neelam born on 5 October 1993 in Mumbai. She is married to entrepreneur Siddharth Chopra since February 2025. She is the sister-in-law of actress Priyanka Chopra.

== Career ==
Neelam Upadhyaya got the opportunity to act in Seivathu Sariye in 2010 but the film was later delayed and subsequently shelved. Neelam Upadhyaya made a breakthrough after her portfolio for MTV's Style Check was well received and prompted filmmakers to offer her acting opportunities. Neelam Upadhyaya made her acting debut with the Telugu film, Mr. 7 (2012), which received mixed reviews and underperformed at the box office. She appeared in the first 3D Telugu film with Action 3D (2013), before appearing in two Tamil films, Unnodu Oru Naal (2013) and the ghost film, Om Shanthi Om (2015) opposite Srikanth.

== Filmography ==
| Year | Film | Role | Language | Notes |
|---|---|---|---|---|
| 2013 | Action 3D | Geetha | Telugu | |
| 2015 | Om Shanthi Om | Shanthi | Tamil | |
