= Vijay Ebenezer =

Indian music composer

- Born: Chennai, Tamil Nadu, India
- Genres: Film score, gospel
- Occupations: Film composer, music director
- Years active: 2011–present

Vijay Ebenezer is an Indian music composer, who mainly produces film scores and soundtracks in the Tamil film industry. He rose to fame with Kandaen, whose audio rights were bought by Gautham Vasudev Menon's Photon Kathaas.

== Career ==
In 2005, he tried composing a song for the first time and subsequently went on to make a gospel album called Nesipaya. From then, every year, he has produced gospel albums. In 2008, singer Krish sang a song for Nesipaya and he was impressed with it and that marked the beginning of a new friendship. Krish put Vijay Ebenezer on to Mugil, the director of Kandaen, and he ended up composing six songs for the film. The music of Kandaen became a commercial and critical success, with the song "Enge En Idhayam", sung by Krish and Dr Burn, topping the charts. Describing how the success changed his life, Vijay noted that "my friends list on a popular social networking site has risen from 200 to 3000 in a matter of days. Due to constant requests, I've now learnt to tweet. The sales of my gospel albums have shot up after the success of Kanden."

His second film score is for Sundar C's Kalakalappu and the audio released in April 2012.

== Filmography ==
- Note: ♦ indicates a remake film.

Year	Tamil	Other language	Notes
2011	Kandaen		
2012	Kalakalappu	Jump Jilani (2014) ♦ (Telugu)	
2013	Ya Ya		
2014	Pappali		
2014	Om Shanti Om		
