= Krish (singer) =

Indian singer (born 1977)

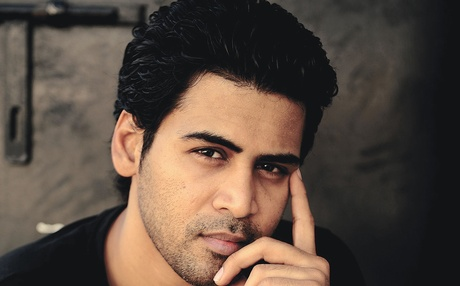
- Born: Vijay Balakrishnan; 12 September 1977 (age 49); Tiruchirappalli, Tamil Nadu, India
- Spouse: Sangeetha (m. 2009)
- Children: 1

Vijay Balakrishnan, better known as Krish, is an Indian playback singer who has worked predominantly in Tamil films apart from some Telugu dubbed and Kannada films. He was introduced to the Tamil cinema as a playback singer by Harris Jayaraj in Vettaiyaadu Vilaiyaadu for the song "Manjal Veyyil". Following, he delivered hits in films such as Unnale Unnale, Pachaikili Muthucharam, Dhaam Dhoom, Bheema, Vaaranam Aayiram, Ayan, Kalloori, Vettaikaran, Sakkarakatti up to Dev. He has sung over 3,000 songs across all languages. Krish has also appeared in multiple films as an actor.

== Early life and career ==
Krish was born in Tiruchirappalli, Tamil Nadu, India, but shifted to New York City after his father, a banker, had moved abroad on a posting. He thus shifted schools and spent 12 years in the United States. During his time in New York City, Krish worked as an Camera assistant on the sets of The Cosby Show and National Treasure: Book of Secrets (2004), helping the teams conduct pre-production works. He also completed an acting course at the New York Film Academy and performed at the Broadway in a Walt Disney production of Aladdin, before arriving in Chennai, hoping to get a breakthrough in the industry as an actor.

During the initial months of his return to Chennai, Krish participated in stage shows and cultural events as a singer and was recruited by composer Ganesh Kumar to sing a western song for an album. Ganesh passed over Krish's details to music composer Harris Jayaraj. Krish then made his playback singing debut in Tamil films by rendering the song "Manjal Veiyil" from Vettaiyaadu Vilaiyaadu (2006), composed by Harris Jayaraj, alongside Hariharan. He subsequently collaborated with the composer on several other critically acclaimed songs including "June Ponal July Kaatru" from Unnale Unnale (2007), "Sakiyae" from Dhaam Dhoom, "Oru Mugamo" from Bheema and "Adiye Kolluthey" from Vaaranam Aayiram (2008). His work saw him garner multiple Filmfare Award nominations, as well as securing a Vijay Award for Best Singer. He has also featured as a lyricist, penning two songs for the romantic comedy Kandaen (2011).

Film-makers from the Tamil film industry had offered Krish roles as an actor in their ventures, but he was insistent that he would only portray the lead role. He turned down the opportunity from K. V. Anand to play the well-received supporting role portrayed by Ajmal in Ko (2011), though he later played a small role as himself in a song from the film. Producer Ibrahim Rowther spotted Krish in the song "Aga Naga" and offered him the chance of portraying the lead role in his production Puriyadha Aanandam Puthithaga Arambam. The film, a romantic love story featuring him alongside Srushti Dange, began shooting in late 2012, but was only released in June 2015. The film had a low key opening, and garnered negative reviews. In June 2015, he also released an independent six-track music album, with compositions by Vijay Ebenezer and videos featuring Nikesha Patel. He had worked alongside Ebenezer for two years for the project, with the song "Maaya" from the album being heavily promoted.

== Personal life ==
Krish married actress Sangeetha at a private ceremony at Annamalaiyar Temple in Tiruvannamalai on 1 February 2009. The pair's daughter was born in December 2012.

== Discography ==
As singer

Year	Album	Composer	Songs	Notes
2004	Kadhal	Joshua Sridhar	Povum Pudikudhu	
2006	Vettaiyaadu Vilaiyaadu	Harris Jayaraj	Manjal Veyyil	Also singer for Telugu dubbed version
2007	En Uyirinum Melana	Deva	Mylapooru Rani	
2007	Kalloori	Joshua Sridhar	June July Madham	
2007	Pachaikili Muthucharam	Harris Jayaraj	Unakkul Naane; Karu Karu	
2007	Unnale Unnale	Harris Jayaraj	June Ponal; Siru Siru Uravagal; Ilamai Ullasam; Unnale Unnale	Also singer for Telugu dubbed version
2008	Buddhivantha (Kannada)	Vijay Antony	"Nee Nanage Beku"	
2008	Dhaam Dhoom	Harris Jayaraj	Sakiyae	
2008	Sakkarakatti	A. R. Rahman	Elay	
2008	Vaaranam Aayiram	Harris Jayaraj	Adiyae Kolluthey	Also singer for Telugu dubbed version
2008	Thenavattu	Srikanth Deva	Pattam Poochi	
2008	Guru En Aalu	Srikanth Deva	Vaanam Vanthu	
2008	Aayutham Seivom	Srikanth Deva	Innum Oru	
2008	Kulir 100°	Bobo Shashi	Un Uyir Nanban	
2008	Bheema	Harris Jayaraj	Oru Mugamo	
2008	Ullasamga Utsahamga	G. V. Prakash Kumar	"Ullasamga"	Telugu film
2009	Vettaikaaran	Vijay Antony	Oru Chinna Thamarai	Edison Awards for Best Male Playback Singer; Nominated-Filmfare Best Male Playback Singer Award; Nominated-Vijay Award for Best Male Playback Singer
2009	Muthirai	Yuvan Shankar Raja	Night is Still Young	
2009	Love Guru (Kannada)	Joshua Sridhar	"Ondondu Storigu"	
2009	Achchamundu! Achchamundu!	Karthik Raja	Kanavugal Kaattril	
2009	Odipolama	D. Imman	Aruvi Pola	
2009	Ayan	Harris Jayaraj	Oh Super Nova (Hey Raja)	Also singer for Telugu dubbed version
2009	Newtonin Moondram Vidhi	Vinay	Kadhal Thandora	
2009	Jeeva (Kannada)	Gurukiran	"Selade Heegeke"	
2010	Mundhinam Paartheney	Thaman	Pesum Poove	
2010	Goa	Yuvan Shankar Raja	"Goa"	
2010	Naayaka (Kannada)	Praveen Duth	"Bhoomi"	
2011	Aakasame Haddu (Telugu)	Anand	Suno Suno	
2011	Mankatha	Yuvan Shankar Raja	Vada Binlada	
2011	Kadhal 2 Kalyanam	Yuvan Shankar Raja	Natpin Kathaigal	
2011	Aanmai Thavarael	Mariya Manohar	Kadhal Adaimalzhai Kaalam, Kadhal Adaimalzhai Kaalam (Remix)	
2011	Kandaen	Vijay Ebenezer	Enge En Idhayam, Oru Paarvai, Aa Haa	
2011	Pesu	Yuvan Shankar Raja	Unthan Varthaiyil	
2011	Ko	Harris Jayaraj	Gala Gala	
2011	Aadu Puli	Sundar C. Babu	Boyse Google.com	
2012	Moondru Per Moondru Kaadhal	Yuvan Shankar Raja	Padapadakkudhu Maname	
2012	Thuppakki	Harris Jayaraj	Antarctica	Also singer for Telugu dubbed version
2012	Maattrraan	Harris Jayaraj	Rettai Kadhire	Also singer for Telugu dubbed version
2012	Yuvan	Joshua Sridhar	Kanpartha Naeram	
2012	Meenkothi	Dheena	Chumma Chumma Pathu	
2012	Etho Seithai Ennai	Ganesh B. Kumar	Kadhil Mattum Inbamaa	
2012	Kalakalappu	Vijay Ebenezer	Angelina	
2012	Nanban	Harris Jayaraj	En Frienda Pola Yaru Machan	Also singer for Telugu dubbed version
2012	Vettai	Yuvan Shankar Raja	Dham Dham	
2013	Endrendrum Punnagai	Harris Jayaraj	Yealae Yealae Dosthu Da	Co-singers: Naresh Iyer, Krishna Iyer
2013	Biriyani	Yuvan Shankar Raja	"Bay Of Bengal"; "Bay Of Bengal (New Jack Swing Mix)"	Telugu dubbed version only
2019	Dev	Harris Jayaraj	Anangae Sinungalama	Also singer for Telugu dubbed version

As composer

- Magarasi (Sun TV)
- Raame Aandalum Raavane Aandalum (2021)

As lyricist

- Kandaen (2011)

== Filmography ==
Year	Film	Role	Notes
2007	Azhagiya Asura	Guna's friend	
2011	Ko	Himself	Cameo appearance
2015	Puriyadha Anandam Puthithaga Arambam	Bharathi	
2017	Si3	V. Sreenivas	
2017	Mupparimanam	Himself	Cameo appearance
2024	Rajakili	Albert	
