= Karthik discography =

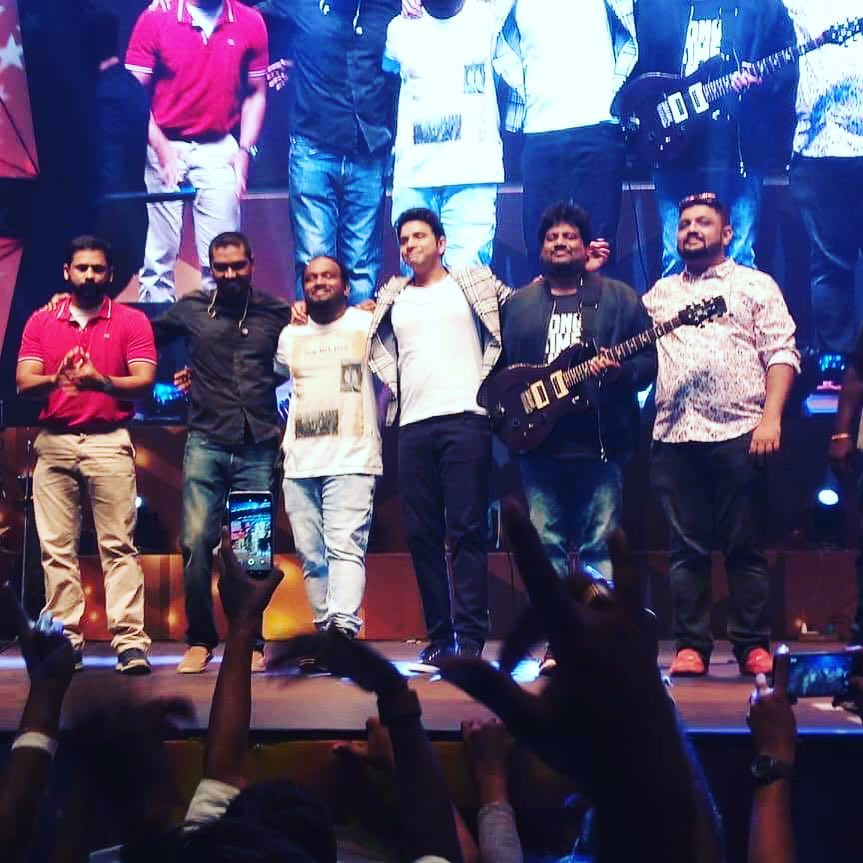
Karthik (fourth from left) at a stage show

Karthik (born 7 November 1980) is an Indian playback singer. Karthik started his professional singing career as a backing vocalist and has since been working as a playback singer. He has sung in multiple languages including Tamil, Telugu, Kannada, Malayalam, Odia, Bengali, Hindi, Marathi, Tulu and Sanskrit.

This is only a partial list; it is noteworthy that Karthik has sung more than 1500 songs.

== Tamil songs ==
Year	Film	Song	Composer	Co-singer(s)
2001	Star	"Adi Nenthikitten"	A. R. Rahman	Chitra Sivaraman
2001	Minnale	"Poopol Poopol"	Harris Jayaraj	Tippu
2001	Minnale	"Maddy Maddy"	Harris Jayaraj	Timmy
2001	12B	"Oru Paarvai Paar"	Harris Jayaraj	
2001	Dhill	"Oh Nanbane"	Vidyasagar	Tippu, K. S. Chithra
2001	Manadhai Thirudivittai	"Manja Kaattu Maina"	Yuvan Shankar Raja	Sadhana Sargam
2001	Dumm Dumm Dumm	"Krishna Krishna"	Karthik Raja	Febi Mani, Harish Raghavendra
2001	Dumm Dumm Dumm	"Athan Varuvaga"	Karthik Raja	Harini, Tippu, Chitra Sivaraman, Malgudi Subha
2001	Majunu	"Hari Gori"	Harris Jayaraj	Tippu, Devan Ekambaram, Febi Mani, Ganga
2001	Alli Thandha Vaanam	"Chennai Pattanam" (film version)	Vidyasagar	
2001	Love Marriage	"Roja Malare"	Deva	Sujatha
2002	Alli Arjuna	"Osaka Moraya"	A. R. Rahman	Vasundhara Das
2002	Paarthale Paravasam	"Ada Moondrezhuthu"	A. R. Rahman	Harini
2002	Kannathil Muthamittal	"Sundari"	A. R. Rahman	Hariharan, Tippu, Sujatha, Srimathumitha
2002	Kannathil Muthamittal	"Signore Signore"	A. R. Rahman	Swarnalatha, Anupama, Rafique, Noel James
2002	Azhagi	"Oliyile Therivadhu"	Ilaiyaraaja	Bhavatharini
2002	Baba	"Maaya Maaya"	A. R. Rahman	Sujatha
2002	Baba	"Sakthi Kodu"	A. R. Rahman	
2002	Run	"Theradi Veethiyil"	Vidyasagar	Manikka Vinayagam
2002	Ezhumalai	"Ella Malaiyilum"	Mani Sharma	K. S. Chithra
2002	Roja Kootam	"Anna Saalaiyil"	Bharadwaj	
2002	Bagavathi	"July Malargale"	Deva	Sadhana Sargam
2002	Kadhal Sugamanathu	"Adi Sugama Chudithare"	Shiva Shankar	
2002	University	"Nenje Thullipo"	Ramesh Vinayakam	
2002	Mounam Pesiyadhe	"Aadatha Aattamellam"	Yuvan Shankar Raja	
2002	Kadhal Virus	"Vaan Nila"	A. R. Rahman	Srinivas
2002	Charlie Chaplin	"Kannadi Selai Katti"	Bharani	Krishnaraj, Swarnalatha, Harini
2002	Thamizhan	"Tamizha Tamizha"	D. Imman	
2002	Pesatha Kannum Pesume	“Azhagamma”	Bharani	Anuradha Sriram
2002	123	"Hey Penne"	Deva	Suresh Peters, Unni Menon, Mathangi
2002	123	"Un Perai"	Deva	Mathangi
2002	Raja	"Singari Singari"	S. A. Rajkumar	
2002	Raja	"Vethalaikodiye"	S. A. Rajkumar	Krishnaraj
2002	Ivan	"Male Toppula"	Ilaiyaraaja	Malgudi Subha
2002	Ivan	"Thoolu Thoolu"	Ilaiyaraaja	Sujatha
2002	Naina	"Jaathi Ponnae"	Sabesh–Murali	Chitra Sivaraman
2002	King	"Kalathai Mathikindra"	Dhina	
2002	En Mana Vaanil	"Kuthu Kuthu"	Ilaiyaraaja	Mano, Sujatha, S. N. Surendar, Harish Raghavendra
2002	En Mana Vaanil	"Unnai Kannum Pothu"	Ilaiyaraaja	Hariharan
2002	En Mana Vaanil	"Muthu Muthu"	Ilaiyaraaja	Bhavatharini
2002	Namma Veetu Kalyanam	"Othuda Othuda"	S. A. Rajkumar	
2002	Samasthanam	"Eswaraa Eswaraa"	Deva	Tippu
2002	Album	"Thathalikudhey"	Karthik Raja	Sadhana Sargam, Tippu
2002	Five Star	"Sunday"	Sriram Parasuram & Anuradha Sriram	Mathangi, Nitish, Jayashree, Arsith
2002	Ramanaa	"Angey Yaaru Paaru"	Ilaiyaraaja	Tippu, S. N. Surendar, Yuvan Shankar Raja
2002	Solla Marandha Kadhai	"Yaedho Onn"	Ilaiyaraaja	Bhavatharini
2002	Villain	"Adicha Nethi Adi"	Vidyasagar	Swarnalatha
2002	April Maadhathil	"Manasae Manasae"	Yuvan Shankar Raja	
2002	April Maadhathil	"Sight Adippom"	Yuvan Shankar Raja	Silambarasan
2002	I Love You Da	"I Love You Da"	Bharadwaj	Pop Shalini
2002	Bala	"Vaanathu Poochi"	Yuvan Shankar Raja	Mathangi
2003	Anbe Sivam	"Anbe Sivam"	Vidyasagar	Kamal Haasan
2003	Lesa Lesa	"Aval Ulaga Azhagiye"	Harris Jayaraj	
2003	Parasuram	"Kadhal Vettukili"	A. R. Rahman	Sadhana Sargam
2003	Parthiban Kanavu	"Enna Seyya"	Vidyasagar	Kalyani Nair
2003	Parthiban Kanavu	"Buck Buck Buck"	Vidyasagar	K. S. Chithra, Mano, T. L. Maharajan, Balram, Manjula, Sandhya, Kalyani Nair
2003	Kaakha Kaakha	"Oru Ooril"	Harris Jayaraj	
2003	Boys	"Girlfriend"	A. R. Rahman	Tippu, Timmy
2003	Boys	"Ale Ale"	A. R. Rahman	Chitra Sivaraman
2003	Boys	"Break the Rules"	A. R. Rahman	Kunal Ganjawala, Sunitha Sarathy, Anupama, George Peter
2003	Alaudin	"Jeeboomba"	Mani Sharma	Kalpana Raghavendar, Shreya Ghoshal
2003	Alaudin	“Goyyaka”	Mani Sharma	Mahalakshmi Iyer
2003	Three Roses	"Meyyainadha"	Karthik Raja	Shweta Mohan
2003	Three Roses	"Sevvai Desam"	Karthik Raja	Shweta Mohan
2003	Three Roses	"Oh Dil Se Pyar"	Karthik Raja	Sujatha
2003	Thirumalai	"Thaamthakka Dheemthakka"	Vidyasagar	Tippu
2003	Enakku 20 Unakku 18	"Yedho Yedho"	A. R. Rahman	Gopika Poornima
2003	Vaseegara	"Marriage Endral"	S. A. Rajkumar	
2003	Chokka Thangam	“Ettu Jilla”	Deva	Anuradha Sriram, Unni Menon
2003	Pop Carn	"Poovellam Paaraddum"	Yuvan Shankar Raja	Tippu, Pop Shalini
2003	Aasai Aasaiyai	"Jinu Jinu"	Mani Sharma	
2003	Aasai Aasaiyai	"Theeppori Pondrathu"	Mani Sharma	K. S. Chithra
2003	Anbu	"Aval Yaaraval"	Vidyasagar	
2003	Anbu	"Vannam Kalainthu"	Vidyasagar	
2003	Kadhaludan	"Pookalin Kathinile"	S. A. Rajkumar	Sujatha
2003	Student Number 1	"Engeyo Thondri"	M. M. Keeravani	
2003	Pallavan	"Saidudu Saidudu"	Vidyasagar	Timmy
2003	Manasellam	"Chinna Kuyile"	Ilaiyaraaja	
2003	Manasellam	"Highwasiley Ley Ley"	Ilaiyaraaja	S. N. Surendar, Tippu
2003	Manasellam	"Midnightula"	Ilaiyaraaja	Malgudi Subha
2003	Pavalakodi	"Andaman Theeve"	Sirpy	Mathangi
2003	Arasu	"Kattha Kattha"	Mani Sharma	Ganga
2003	Punnagai Poove	"Thilaakkaeni Ganaa"	Yuvan Shankar Raja	Tippu
2003	Well Done	"Kitchu Kitchu"	Vidyasagar	Sangeetha
2003	Anbe Anbe	"Malayala Karaiyoram"	Bharadwaj	
2003	Indru Mudhal	"Vanavillai Unnai"	Deva	Sujatha
2003	Jayam	"Kaathal Kaathal"	R. P. Patnaik	
2003	Jayam	"Kaathal Thandha Vali"	R. P. Patnaik	Ganga
2003	Ice	"Hey Penne"	Devi Sri Prasad	Kalpana
2003	Kadhal Kisu Kisu	"Adadaa"	Vidyasagar	Manikka Vinayagam
2003	Kadhal Kisu Kisu	"Kabadi Kabadi"	Vidyasagar	Tippu, Ganga, Pop Shalini, Febi Mani
2003	Diwan	"Konjam Konjama"	S. A. Rajkumar	Anuradha Sriram
2003	Success	"Hey Un Vayasena"	Deva	Mathangi
2003	Thiruda Thirudi	"Unna Paartha"	Dhina	Pop Shalini
2003	Alai	"En Ragasiya Kanavukal"	Vidyasagar	Srivardhini
2003	Alai	"Thinga Kizhamaiyaana"	Vidyasagar	Timmy
2003	Aalukkoru Aasai	"Kanthan Endral Arivu”	S. A. Rajkumar	
2003	Kaiyodu Kai	"Innoru Bhoomi"	Banapathra	Ranjith
2003	Kaiyodu Kai	"Pennondru"	Banapathra	Srinivas
2003	Anjaneya	"Paisa Gopuram"	Mani Sharma	Anuradha Sriram
2003	Ottran	"Yeh Thiththippey"	Pravin Mani	Suchitra
2003	Iyarkai	"Iyarkai Thaaye"	Vidyasagar	Srivardhini
2003	Iyarkai	"Seetu Kattu"	Vidyasagar	Manikka Vinayagam
2003	Anbe Un Vasam	"Ore Oru Paarvaiyaal"	Dhina	Sadhana Sargam
2003	Joot	"Vedi Veesuraan"	Vidyasagar	Jyotsna
2003	Joot	"Aadivarum Azhagiya"	Vidyasagar	Manikka Vinayagam, Tippu
2003	Joot	"Azhagiya Koondal"	Vidyasagar	Srivardhini
2003	Indru	"Ponmaalai"	Deva	
2004	Kovil	"Collegeikku"	Harris Jayaraj	
2004	Kovil	"Puyale Puyale"	Harris Jayaraj	Mahathi
2004	Arasatchi	"Chant of Arasatchi"	Harris Jayaraj	Chandran
2004	Kangalal Kaidhu Sei	"Anaarkali"	A. R. Rahman	Chitra Sivaraman, Kadhir, Murtuza
2004	Sullan	"Kavidhai Iravu"	Vidyasagar	K. S. Chithra
2004	Perazhagan	"Ambuli Mama"	Yuvan Shankar Raja	
2004	Aaytha Ezhuthu	"Jana Gana Mana"	A. R. Rahman	A. R. Rahman
2004	Aaytha Ezhuthu	"Hey Goodbye Nanba"	A. R. Rahman	Shankar Mahadevan, Sunitha Sarathy, Lucky Ali
2004	New	"New New"	A. R. Rahman	Blaaze, Vijay Prakash, Sunitha Sarathy, Tanvi Shah
2004	Udhaya	"Thiruvallikeni Rani"	A. R. Rahman	Sukhwinder Singh
2004	Madurey	"Ice Katti"	Vidyasagar	Sayanora Philip
2004	7G Rainbow Colony	"Kanpesum Varthaigal"	Yuvan Shankar Raja	
2004	Engal Anna	"Kadhal Dhushyantha"	Deva	Sujatha
2004	Jai	"Kanna Simittina"	Mani Sharma	Mahalakshmi Iyer
2004	Thendral	"Pachai Kili"	Vidyasagar	Harini
2004	Thendral	"Pathrakotta Mama"	Vidyasagar	Malathy, Manikka Vinayagam, Vidya
2004	Varnajalam	"Nee Vendum"	Vidyasagar	Mahathi
2004	Varnajalam	"Pinju Mazhai Charal"	Vidyasagar	
2004	Autograph	"Meesa Vecha Perandi"	Bharadwaj	Kovai Kamala
2004	Ennavo Pudichirukku	"Kasuku"	Subhash Jawahar	Sujatha
2004	Campus	"Orange Poove"	Rajneesh	Mathangi
2004	Aethirree	"Podu Nanba Sakkai Podu"	Yuvan Shankar Raja	
2004	Jana	"Pothuva Palaruku"	Dhina	Anuradha Sriram
2004	Jore	"Jore Bada Jore"	Deva	
2004	Sullan	"Kilu Kiluppana 2"	Vidyasagar	Premgi Amaren, Pop Shalini
2004	Azhagiya Theeye	"Maattikkittenae"	Ramesh Vinayakam	
2004	Arivumani	"Poopol"	Janakiraj	Harini
2004	Kudaikul Mazhai	"Pada Pada Vena"	Karthik Raja	
2004	Gajendra	"Erumbu Onnu"	Deva	Anuradha Sriram
2004	Giri	"Adra Sakkai"	D. Imman	Pop Shalini
2004	Giri	"Oppankara Veethiyiley"	D. Imman	Chinmayi
2004	Oru Murai Sollividu	"Kattunaakka Ivala Kattu"	Bharadwaj	Mahathi
2004	Bose	"Bommalaattam"	Yuvan Shankar Raja	Chitra Sivaraman
2004	Vishwa Thulasi	"Kanavilavathu"	M. S. Viswanathan	Gopika Poornima
2004	Attahasam	"Pollachi Ilaneere"	Bharadwaj	Anuradha Sriram
2004	Chatrapathy	"Nee Ragasiyamaga"	S. A. Rajkumar	Vasundara Dass
2004	Jai Soorya	"Vachukka Solli"	Deva	Febi Mani
2004	Jananam	"Ore Oru Mutham"	Bharadwaj	Srilekha Parthasarathy
2004	Jananam	"Sudum Varai Neruppu"	Bharadwaj	Tippu, Timmy, Yugendran, MK Balaji
2004	Kaadhal	"Kiru Kiru"	Joshua Sridhar	Pop Shalini
2004	Ramakrishna	"KokkuchiKokku"	Deva	Sadhana Sargam
2004	Ramakrishna	"Peiyummazhiyamma"	Deva	Deva, Sadhana Sargam, Paravai Muniyamma, Sabesh, Jayalakshmi
2005	Chandramukhi	"Annanoda Paattu"	Vidyasagar	KK, Sujatha, Chinnaponnu
2005	Sachein	"Dai Dai Kattikoda"	Devi Sri Prasad	Sunitha Sarathy
2005	Thotti Jaya	"Uyire En Uyire"	Harris Jayaraj	Anuradha Sriram, Bombay Jayashree
2005	Thotti Jaya	"Yaari Singari"	Harris Jayaraj	Ceylon Manohar, Sriram, Srilekha Parthasarathy
2005	Ghajini	"Oru Maalai"	Harris Jayaraj	
2005	Sandakozhi	"Gumthalakkadi Gaana"	Yuvan Shankar Raja	Ranjith
2005	Sandakozhi	"Mundasu Sooriyane"	Yuvan Shankar Raja	Palakkad Sreeram
2005	Girivalam	"Adiyae Aandaal Amma"	Deva	Anuradha Sriram, Srilekha Parthasarathy
2005	Girivalam	"Mayavarathu Kaara"	Deva	Shoba Chandrasekhar
2005	Ullam Ketkumae	"Kanavugal"	Harris Jayaraj	Tippu, O. S. Arun, Premgi Amaren, Febi Mani, Pop Shalini, Suchitra
2005	Dancer	"Dancer"	Pravin Mani	Suresh Peters
2005	Aayudham	"Sarakku Sarakku"	Dhina	Srilekha Parthasarathy
2005	Ayodhya	"Kichili Kichilikka"	Sabesh-Murali	
2005	Ji	"Sarala Kondayil"	Vidyasagar	
2005	Kannadi Pookal	"Konjam Aasai"	S. A. Rajkumar	
2005	Kadhal FM	“Adam Eval”	Aravind-Shankar	
2005	London	"Kee Mu Kee Pee"	Vidyasagar	Pravin Mani, Tippu
2005	London	"Yaaro Oruthi"	Vidyasagar	
2005	Karagattakkari	"Kattukkili"	Ilaiyaraaja	Bhavatharini
2005	Kicha Vayasu 16	"Kelambuthu"	Dhina	Dhina, Divya Kasthuri, Dev Prakash, Kiran
2005	Gurudeva	"Silenta Sirichu"	Sabesh-Murali	Pop Shalini
2005	Thaka Thimi Tha	"Rayalaseema Rani"	D. Imman	Anita Udeep
2005	Sevvel	"Sutti Penne"	Aasan	Mahathi
2005	Priyasakhi	"Anbu Alaipayuthe"	Bharadwaj	Unnikrishnan, Maanuvel Nouyar, Reshmi, Malawi Karthikeyan
2005	Jithan	"Ennai Thedi"	Srikanth Deva	Sunitha Sarathy
2005	Amudhae	"Valaya Kadu"	Sunil Xavier	Subha
2005	Neeye Nijam	"Enn Uyiril"	John Peter	Priya
2005	Englishkaran	"Ghajini Mohammed"	Deva	Suchitra
2005	Kaatrullavarai	"Aanvaasamum Penvaasamum"	Bharani	K. S. Chithra
2005	Kaatrullavarai	"Mazhaiyil Nanaindha (male 1)"	Bharani	
2005	Chinna	"Osthara Pilusthunara"	D. Imman	Devan, Ranjith
2005	February 14	"Laila Majnu"	Bharadwaj	Sadhana Sargam
2005	February 14	"Nanba Nanba"	Bharadwaj	Bharadwaj, Srinivas, Janani Bharadwaj
2005	Daas	"Nee Enthan"	Yuvan Shankar Raja	
2005	Selvam	"Oh Venpura Ondru"	Deva	Jeevarikha
2005	Selvam	"Oodum Megame"	Deva	
2005	Alaiyadikkuthu	"Mela Paaru"	Bharani	Grace Karunas
2005	ABCD	"Yaar Potta Kolam"	D. Imman	
2005	Chidambarathil Oru Appasamy	"Nalla Vaazhvu"	Ilaiyaraaja	Manjari
2005	Oru Kalluriyin Kathai	"Kangal Kalangida"	Yuvan Shankar Raja	
2005	Karpanai	"Orukadal"	Santhosh Jayaraj	
2005	Chanakya	"Romba Azhagu"	Srikanth Deva	Anuradha Sriram
2005	Kasthuri Maan	"Oru Porkaalam"	Ilaiyaraaja	Manjari
2005	Ambuttu Imbuttu Embuttu	"Anjukkum Patthukkum"	Dhina	
2005	Anbe Vaa	"Pidikavilaida"	D. Imman	Srilekha Parthasarathy
2005	Kanda Naal Mudhal	"Koo Koovena"	Yuvan Shankar Raja	Harish Raghavendra, Mahalakshmi Iyer
2005	Aanai	"Figurudan Oru Naal"	D. Imman	Saindhavi
2005	Veeranna	"Thali Kazhuthile Enranathu"	Soundaryan	Anuradha Sriram
2006	Aathi	"Olli Olli Iduppay"	Vidyasagar	Anuradha Sriram
2006	Unakkum Enakkum	"Un Paarvayil"	Devi Sri Prasad	Sumangali
2006	Vathiyar	"Yennadi Muniyamma (Remix)"	D. Imman	Blaaze
2006	Vathiyar	"Thanjavooru Gopuramey"	D. Imman	Kalyani
2006	Thiruvilaiyaadal Aarambam	"Madura Jilla"	D. Imman	Kalpana Raghavendar
2006	Thiruvilaiyaadal Aarambam	"Ennamma Kannu"	D. Imman	Ranjith
2006	Sivappathigaram	"Chithhiraiyil Enna"	Vidyasagar	Swarnalatha, Malaiyamma
2006	Sivappathigaram	"Kalloori Salaikkul"	Vidyasagar	Jack Smelly, Sunitha Sarathy
2006	Veyil	"Kaadhal Neruppin"	G. V. Prakash Kumar	Chinmayi, Nidheesh Gopalan
2006	Chennai Kadhal	"Salladai Salladai"	Joshua Sridhar	Shweta Mohan
2006	Chennai Kadhal	"Angel Angel"	Joshua Sridhar	
2006	Parijatham	"Oru Nodi Iru Nodi"	Dharan Kumar	Srilekha Parthasarathy, Shweta Mohan
2006	Thiruttu Payale	"Avala Partha"	Bharadwaj	Donal Arjun, Bharadwaj
2006	Kokki	"Ivana Yevana"	Dhina	Madhushree
2006	Kokki	"Ore Oru Sogam"	Dhina	
2006	Madhu	"Dum Irundha Munnale Vaa"	Ilaiyaraaja	Naveen, Ranjith
2006	Kalinga	"Kaapathungo"	D. Imman	
2006	Kai Vandha Kalai	"Suttipoove"	Dhina	Sadhana Sargam
2006	Naalai	"Naalai Indha Kaalam"	Karthik Raja	
2006	Naalai	"Oru Mattram"	Karthik Raja	
2006	Aacharya	"Kathavai Thirandhu"	Srikanth Deva	
2006	Kusthi	"Kokkarakko"	D. Imman	
2006	Uyir	"Udhadum Udhadum"	Joshua Sridhar	Chandni
2006	Thullura Vayasu	"Thullura Vayasu"	Karthik Raja	
2006	Thullura Vayasu	"Yetho Yetho" (male)	Karthik Raja	
2006	Thoothukudi	"Kozhukkatta"	Pravin Mani	Sujatha
2006	Yuga	"Yugaa"	Dhina	
2006	Boys and Girls	"Un Nenjile"	Sirpy	
2006	Nee Venunda Chellam	"Kallathoni"	Dhina	Suchitra
2006	Em Magan	"Goligundu Kanu"	Vidyasagar	Kalyani Nair
2006	Jambhavan	"Velan Vetri Velan"	Bharadwaj	
2006	Kedi	"Antha Vannam Pola"	Yuvan Shankar Raja	Chinmayi
2006	Mann	"Kadhal"	German Vijay	
2006	Ilakkanam	"Unnakke En Aaviyum"	Bhavatharini	Shalini
2007	Pachaikili Muthucharam	"Karu Karu Vizhigalaal"	Harris Jayaraj	Krish, Naresh Iyer
2007	Naalaiya Pozhuthum Unnodu	"Pesa Peraasa"	Srikanth Deva	Bhavatharini
2007	Mozhi	"En Jannalil"	Vidyasagar	
2007	Unnale Unnale	"Unnale Unnale"	Harris Jayaraj	Krish, Harini
2007	Majaa	"Chi Chi Chi"	Vidyasagar	Harini, Shankar Mahadevan, Savitha, Viji
2007	Chennai 600028	"Jalsa"	Yuvan Shankar Raja	Ranjith, Tippu, Haricharan, Premgi Amaren
2007	Kanna	"Kuyil Paadum Paatu"	Ranjit Barot	Shreya Ghoshal
2007	Kanna	"Azhagiya Penne"	Ranjit Barot	
2007	Polladhavan	"Minnalgal Koothadum"	G. V. Prakash Kumar	Bombay Jayashree
2007	Guru	"Paisa Paisa"	A. R. Rahman	Madhushree
2007	Muruga	"En Kathali"	Karthik Raja	
2007	Muni	"Assah Pussah"	Bharadwaj	Priya Himesh
2007	Nanbanin Kadhali	"Aalilla Kattukulla"	Deva	Anuradha Sriram
2007	Manikanda	"Hey Mukundha"	Deva	Pop Shalini
2007	Adavadi	"En Anbea"	Deva	Mrunalini
2007	Koodal Nagar	"Yakka Nillukka"	Sabesh–Murali	
2007	Kaanal Neer	"Kaanal Neere"	Suresh-Bobby	
2007	Maya Kannadi	"Konjam Konjam"	Ilaiyaraaja	Shreya Ghoshal
2007	Mudhal Kanave	"Yaarai Kettu"	Srikanth Deva	Kalyani
2007	Parattai Engira Azhagu Sundaram	"Chikku Bukku"	Gurukiran	Priya Himesh
2007	Thiru Ranga	"Ivane Ivana"	Srikanth Deva	Priyadarshini
2007	Karuppusamy Kuththagaithaarar	"Sangam Vaithu"	Dhina	Dhina, Kavi, Sangeetha Rajeshwaran
2007	Paali	"Unnai Paathadum"	Bhagwat	Mahathi
2007	Maamadurai	"Koondukkal"	Karthik Raja	Sangeetha Rajeshwaran
2007	Maamadurai	"Sorgam Arugile"	Karthik Raja	Rita
2007	Kireedam	“Kanavellam”	G. V. Prakash Kumar	P. Jayachandran
2007	Aarya	"Aarya"	Mani Sharma	Suchitra
2007	Aarya	"Aruginil"	Mani Sharma	Varthini
2007	Oru Ponnu Oru Paiyan	"Oru Ponnu"	Karthik Raja	Swarnalatha
2007	Oru Ponnu Oru Paiyan	"Kalkona Uthathukari"	Karthik Raja	Rita
2007	Cheena Thaana 001	"Unnai Paartha"	Deva	Harini
2007	Marudhamalai	"Hey Yenmama"	D. Imman	Megha, Suchitra
2007	Marudhamalai	"Oonjaliley Oru Angeley"	D. Imman	Dr. G .K. Lavanya
2007	Thirutham	"Labam Yogam"	Pravin Mani	
2007	Nam Naadu	"Manasil Manasil"	Srikanth Deva	Chinmayi
2007	Veeramum Eeramum	"Purusha Payale"	Yugendran	Prashanthini
2007	Agra	"En Jeevan"	C. S. Balu	Preethi
2007	Kelvikuri	"Un Kangal Pada Padavena"	G. Sathya Prasath	Vinaya
2007	Pazhaniappa Kalloori	"Vayasu Pasangala"	R. P. Patnaik	
2008	Bheema	"Siru Paarvayale"	Harris Jayaraj	Harini
2008	Yaaradi Nee Mohini	"Oru Naalukul"	Yuvan Shankar Raja	Rita
2008	Yaaradi Nee Mohini	"Penne Ennai Kodu"	Yuvan Shankar Raja	
2008	Yaaradi Nee Mohini	"Engeyo Paartha" (II)	Yuvan Shankar Raja	
2008	Jayamkondaan	"Adaimazhai Kaalam"	Vidyasagar	
2008	Jodhaa Akbar	"Idhayam Idam Mariyadhe"	A. R. Rahman	K. S. Chitra
2008	Kadhalil Vizhunthen	"Un Thalaimudi"	Vijay Antony	Maya, Nitish Gopalan
2008	Vaaranam Aayiram	"Ava Enna Enna"	Harris Jayaraj	R. Prasanna
2008	Pidichirukku	"Kaatrodu Solli"	Manu Ramesan	Sadhana Sargam
2008	Arai En 305-il Kadavul	"Alaipayithey"	Vidyasagar	Shweta Mohan
2008	Arai En 305-il Kadavul	"Thendralukku Nee"	Vidyasagar	Shweta Mohan
2008	Pirivom Sandhipom	"Kanden Kanden"	Vidyasagar	Shweta Mohan
2008	Pirivom Sandhipom	"Medhuva Medhuva"	Vidyasagar	Harini
2008	Pazhani	"Yaarum Ennidam"	Srikanth Deva	Sadhana Sargam
2008	Thangam	"Othakathu"	Srikanth Deva	Saindhavi
2008	Valluvan Vasuki	"Sollaama" (I)	S. A. Rajkumar	Harini
2008	Valluvan Vasuki	"Sollaama" (II)	S. A. Rajkumar	Priya Himesh
2008	Ezhuthiyatharadi	"Enakkoru Kadal Kaditham"	Sri Mahan	
2008	Ezhuthiyatharadi	"Unnil Kadalagi (male)"	Sri Mahan	
2008	Theekuchi	"Kadhalane"	Srikanth Deva	Sadhana Sargam
2008	Inbaa	"Yaaro Yaaro"	P. B. Balaji	Chinmayi
2008	Kannum Kannum	"Ennaiyum Unnaiyum"	Dhina	
2008	Nepali	"Anaikindra Dhaagam"	Srikanth Deva	Bombay Jayashree, Suchitra
2008	Chakkara Viyugam	"Neer Aadiduvoom"	Karthik Raja	Sangeetha Rajeshwaran, Snehan, Kanishka
2008	Unnai Naan	"Kadhaliye Nizhal Kadhaliye"	Joe Arulraj	
2008	Unnai Naan	"Yetho Manasil Nindrathey"	Joe Arulraj	Shalini
2008	Alibhabha	"Neenda Mounam"	Vidyasagar	Rajeswari
2008	Dhanam	"Ilamai Kanavugal"	Ilaiyaraaja	Rita
2008	Dhanam	"Dhanam Dhanam"	Ilaiyaraaja	
2008	Poi Solla Porom	"Kannamoochi Aattam"	M. G. Sreekumar	
2008	Vasool	"Kaathaley Kaathaley"	Vijay Shankar	
2008	Durai	"Raja Rajathi"	D. Imman	
2008	Durai	"Veddaikkum Sonthakkaran"	D. Imman	Saloni
2008	Kathikappal	"Swasame Ennthan"	Sree Sai	
2008	Seval	"Thaayaramma Thaayaaru"	G. V. Prakash Kumar	Vadivelu
2008	Thenavattu	"Enakkena Pirandhavalo"	Srikanth Deva	Suchitra, Arun
2008	Mahesh, Saranya Matrum Palar	"Yaarathu Yaarathu"	Vidyasagar	
2008	Poo	"Maman Engirukka"	S. S. Kumaran	Harini, Tippu, Master Rohith
2008	Panchamirtham	"Kadhal Vandhal"	Sundar C Babu	Rita
2009	Padikathavan	"Kadavulum Kadhalum"	Mani Sharma	Harini
2009	Vennila Kabadi Kuzhu	"Pada Pada"	V. Selvaganesh	
2009	Vennila Kabadi Kuzhu	"Lesa Parakudhu"	V. Selvaganesh	Chinmayi
2009	Yavarum Nalam	"Chinna Kuyil Koovum"	Shankar–Ehsaan–Loy	
2009	Yavarum Nalam	"Chinna Kuyil Koovum (remix)"	Shankar–Ehsaan–Loy	
2009	Ayan	"Vizhi Moodi"	Harris Jayaraj	
2009	Aadhavan	"Hasile Fisile"	Harris Jayaraj	Harini, Dr. Burn, Maya
2009	Moscowin Kavery	"Gore Gore"	S. Thaman	Suchitra
2009	Guru En Aalu	"Alaipayithey"	Srikanth Deva	Ranjith, Nithyasree Mahadevan, Shweta Mohan
2009	Malai Malai	"Pooparikka Cholli"	Mani Sharma	Shweta Mohan
2009	Malai Malai	"Anbumanam"	Mani Sharma	Rita
2009	A Aa E Ee	"Natta Nada"	Vijay Antony	Sangeetha Rajeshwaran, Christopher
2009	Satrumun Kidaitha Thagaival	"Sei Sei"	Bala	Madhumitha
2009	Thee	"Kaalai Nera"	Srikanth Deva	
2009	Adada Enna Azhagu	"Ulaga Azhagellam"	T. M. Jayamurugan & Jeevan Thomas	Shankar Mahadevan
2009	Karthik Anitha	"Thada Thada"	Jack Anand	Kalyani
2009	Ilampuyal	"Unnai Thoduvathilae"	Vashanth Sellathurai	Malathy
2009	Gnabagangal	"Kadalil"	James Vick	Suchitra
2009	Sirithal Rasipen	"Aagayame Ingu Vanthu"	Iniyavan	Saindhavi
2009	Pudhiya Payanam	"Ethayam Kanalayo"	Prasad Ganesh	Kalyani
2009	Thalai Ezhuthu	"Oru Parvaiyile"	Godwin	Lavanya
2009	Kadhal Kadhai	"Kadukule Nadakurathe"	Ilaiyaraaja	
2009	Aarumaname	"Aara Aariro"	Srikanth Deva	
2009	Pokkisham	"Anjal Petti"	Sabesh–Murali	
2009	Pokkisham	"Mudru Naal Aagume"	Sabesh–Murali	
2009	Kannukulle	"Engae Nee Sendralum"	Ilaiyaraaja	Bela Shende
2009	Thiru Thiru Thuru Thuru	"Thiru Thiru Vizhiyae"	Mani Sharma	Rita
2009	Munnar	"Konjam Poo Konjam Thaen" (Duet)	Devendran	Chinmayi
2009	Vedappan	"Nathiyin Payanam Kadalai Thedum"	Nesan	
2009	Kanden Kadhalai	"Venpanju"	Vidyasagar	Udit Narayan
2009	Palaivana Solai	"Aalanalum"	E. K. Bobby	
2009	Vettattam	"Thannadhani"	Sri Sai	
2009	Vettattam	"Kangal Pesum"	Sri Sai	Sunitha
2010	Semmozhiyaana Thamizh Mozhiyaam	"Semmozhiyaana Thamizh Mozhiyaam"	A. R. Rahman	Various
2010	Aayirathil Oruvan	"Oh Eesa"	G. V. Prakash Kumar	Andrea Jeremiah
2010	Vinnaithaandi Varuvaayaa	"Vinnaithaandi Varuvaayaa"	A. R. Rahman	
2010	Angadi Theru	"Karungali Naayae"	G.V. Prakash Kumar	Mahesh, Pandi
2010	Paiyaa	"Suthudhe Suthudhe Boomi"	Yuvan Shankar Raja	Sunitha Sarathy
2010	Sura	"Siragadikkum Nilavu"	Mani Sharma	Rita
2010	Mandhira Punnagai	"Satta Sada Sada"	Vidyasagar	Shweta Mohan
2010	Mandhira Punnagai	"Thanni Poda Vaapa"	Vidyasagar	
2010	Mandhira Punnagai	"Thanni Poda Vaapa" (Club Mix)	Vidyasagar	
2010	Goripalayam	"Enna Indha Maatramo"	Sabesh–Murali	Srimathumitha
2010	Kadhalagi	"Rojathottathil"	A. R. Reihana	Benny Dayal, Prashanthini, A. R. Reihana
2010	Raavanan	"Usurae Pogudhey"	A. R. Rahman	
2010	Baana Kaathadi	"Paithiyam Pidikudhu"	Yuvan Shankar Raja	
2010	Kaadhal Solla Vandhen	"Anbulla Sandhya"	Yuvan Shankar Raja	
2010	Boss Engira Bhaskaran	"Thathi Thaavum Paper Naan"	Yuvan Shankar Raja	
2010	Agam Puram	"Kangalai Parithidum"	Sundar C. Babu	Ranjini Josh
2010	Thunichal	"Yezhu Vannamai"	Premgi Amaren	K. S. Chithra
2010	Porkkalam	"Yaaro Ivan Yaaro"	Rohit Kulkarni	Carolisa
2010	Azhagaana Ponnuthan	"Vaanathu Nilavu"	Sundar C. Babu	
2010	Azhagaana Ponnuthan	"Enakkulle"	Sundar C. Babu	
2010	Maathi Yosi	"Methuvai Methuvai"	Guru Kalyan	Jaya, Rajgopal
2010	Padagasalai	"Konjum Kumari"	Hitesh	
2010	Kola Kolaya Mundhirika	"Notta Kudu"	V. Selvaganesh	Suchitra
2010	Maanja Velu	"Ooril Ulla Uyirghalelaam"	Mani Sharma	
2010	Ambasamudram Ambani	"Soru Vechen"	Karunas	
2010	Veluthu Kattu	"Sangili Pungili"	Bharani	Rap Valla, Shoba Chandrasekhar
2010	Mandabam	"Silmisham"	Iniya Mahesan	Vinaya
2010	Inidhu Inidhu	"Inbam Ethirilae"	Mickey J. Meyer	Timmy, Grid Lock
2010	Inidhu Inidhu	"Inidhu Inidhu"	Mickey J. Meyer	
2010	Inidhu Inidhu	"Vaazhkai Oru"	Mickey J. Meyer	
2010	Neeyum Naanum	"Hai Figure Onnu"	Sriram Vijay	
2010	Neeyum Naanum	"Neeyum Naanum"	Sriram Vijay	
2010	Unakkaga En Kadhal	"Yen En Manathai" (male)	Sanjeev–Darshan	
2010	Irandu Mugam	"Kannum Kannum"	Bharadwaj	Surmukhi Raman
2010	Puzhal	"Emmanase"	Nallathambi	Surmukhi Raman
2010	Puzhal	"Thiranthidu Vaane"	Nallathambi	
2010	Sindhu Samaveli	"Ovoru Manithan"	Sundar C Babu	
2010	Drohi	"Sama Sama Yama Yama"	V. Selvaganesh	Silambarasan, Tippu, Maya
2010	Naane Ennul Illai	"Medhuvaga Medhuvaga"	Amresh Ganesh	Chinmayi
2010	Vaada	"Kinguda Kinguda"	D. Imman	
2010	Vallakottai	"Sarakku Readya"	Dhina	Reeta, Arjun, Sathyan, Dhina
2010	Magizhchi	"Otthhu Thanni Aathoda"	Vidyasagar	Chandrayee
2010	Magizhchi	"Selai Kattiya Sevanthi"	Vidyasagar	Roshini, Sithara
2010	Magizhchi	"Koorapattu Selaikkari"	Vidyasagar	
2010	Aattanayagann	"Pattampoochi"	Srikanth Deva	Sadhana Sargam
2010	Nil Gavani Sellathey	"Vanavillum"	V. Selvaganesh	Premgi Amaren, Brodha V, Kalpana, Srimathumitha
2010	Aridhu Aridhu	"Un Uyirai"	S. Thaman	
2011	Kaavalan	"Yaaradu"	Vidyasagar	Suchitra
2011	Kaavalan	"Sada Sada"	Vidyasagar	
2011	Thoonga Nagaram	"Kalyanam (remix)"	Sundar C. Babu	
2011	Avargalum Ivargalum	"Para Para"	Srikanth Deva	Senthildass Velayutham, Surmukhi Raman, Renuka
2011	Kullanari Koottam	"Vizhigalile"	V. Selvaganesh	Chinmayi
2011	Engeyum Kadhal	"Lolita"	Harris Jayaraj	Prashanthini
2011	Engeyum Kadhal	"Dhimu Dhimu"	Harris Jayaraj	
2011	180	"Nee Korinal"	Sharreth	Shweta Mohan
2011	Venghai	"Kaalangathale"	Devi Sri Prasad	
2011	Veppam	"Kaatril Eeram"	Joshua Sridhar	Sricharan
2011	Mankatha	"Balle Lakka"	Yuvan Shankar Raja	Vijay Yesudas, Anusha Dayanidhi
2011	Mankatha	"Machi Open The Bottle"	Yuvan Shankar Raja	Mano, Premgi Amaran, Haricharan, Tippu, Naveen Madhav, Suchith Suresan, D. Sathyaprakash, Rahul Nambiar, M. K. Balaji
2011	Vanthaan Vendraan	"Kanchana Mala"	S. Thaman	Priya Himesh
2011	Vedi	"Ippadi Mazhai"	Vijay Antony	Saindhavi
2011	7aam Arivu	"Mun Andhi"	Harris Jayaraj	Megha
2011	7aam Arivu	"Yellae Lama"	Harris Jayaraj	Vijay Prakash, Shruti Haasan, Pop Shalini
2011	Velayudham	"Chillax"	Vijay Antony	Charulatha Mani
2011	Thambi Vettothi Sundaram	"Kolaikaaraa"	Vidyasagar	Kalyani
2011	Uyarthiru 420	"Uyire Un Mounam"(Duet)	Mani Sharma	Shweta Mohan
2011	Varnam	"Kaathal Vandhaal"	Isaac Thomas Kottukapally	Shweta Mohan
2011	Ilaignan	"Oru Nila"	Vidyasagar	Shreya Ghoshal
2011	Azhagarsamiyin Kuthirai	"Poova Kelu"	Ilaiyaraaja	Shreya Ghoshal
2011	Udhayan	"Ithanai Yugamai"	Manikanth Kadri	
2011	Bodinayakkanur Ganesan	"Pooti Kedandha Manasu"	John Peter	Priya
2011	Karungali	"Priyame"	Srikanth Deva	
2011	Potta Potti	"Adangaathaa Vegam"	Aruldev	
2011	Yuvan Yuvathi	"Un Kannai Partha Piragu"	Vijay Antony	Ramya NSK
2011	Aayiram Vilakku	"Aandipatti"	Srikanth Deva	
2011	Aayiram Vilakku	"Paappakku Oru Jigarthanda"	Srikanth Deva	Rita
2011	Aayiram Vilakku	"Porale"	Srikanth Deva	
2011	Sadhurangam	"Enge Enge"	Vidyasagar	Timmy
2011	Sadhurangam	"Enna Thandhi"	Vidyasagar	Srilekha Parthasarathy
2011	Mouna Guru	"Anaamika"	S. Thaman	Harini
2011	Maharaja	"Raja Raja Maharaja"	D. Imman	M. L. R. Karthikeyan, Solar Sai
2012	Vettai	"Dham Dham"	Yuvan Shankar Raja	Krish
2012	Kadhalil Sodhappuvadhu Yeppadi	"Azhaipaya"	S. Thaman	Harini
2012	Kadhalil Sodhappuvadhu Yeppadi	"Azhaipaya" (Solo)	S. Thaman	
2012	Aravaan	"Oruvaan Iruvaan"	Karthik	
2012	Kondaan Koduthaan	"Pavadai Pattampuchiye"	Deva	Chinmayi
2012	Oru Kal Oru Kannadi	"Adada Oru Devadhai"	Harris Jayaraj	
2012	Raattinam	"Yele Yepulla"	Manu Ramesan	Chinmayi
2012	Naan Ee	"Veesum Velichathile"	M. M. Keeravani	Sahithi
2012	Maalai Pozhudhin Mayakathilaey	"En Uyire"	Achu Rajamani	
2012	Maattrraan	"Naani Koni"	Harris Jayaraj	Vijay Prakash, Shreya Ghoshal, Shekhinah Shawn Jazeel
2012	Maattrraan	"Yaaro Yaaro"	Harris Jayaraj	Priya Himesh
2012	Thuppakki	"Poi Varavaa"	Harris Jayaraj	Chinmayi
2012	Neethaane En Ponvasantham	"Pudikale Maame"	Ilaiyaraaja	Suraj Jagan
2012	Neethaane En Ponvasantham	"Kaatrai Konjam"	Ilaiyaraaja	
2012	Neethaane En Ponvasantham	"Yennodu Vaa Vaa"	Ilaiyaraaja	
2012	Medhai	"Ungakitta Rendukannum Ottikiduchu"	Dhina	K. S. Chithra
2012	Vilayada Vaa	"Lali Lali Kadhali"	Srimurali	Ujjayinee Roy
2012	Ambuli	"Nenjukulla Yaaru"	Sam C. S.	Chinmayi
2012	Naanga	"Idhazhil"	Bala Bharathi	Chinmayi
2012	Ullam	"Kannai Thiranthu"	Yuvan Shankar Raja	Mahathi
2012	Aayiram Muthangaludan Thenmozhi	"Theendatha Theeyai"	Taj Noor	Padmalatha
2012	Nanda Nanditha	"Jimke Marina"	Emil Mohammed	Emil Mohammed, Harish Raghavendra, Tippu, Srinivas
2012	Nanda Nanditha	"Jimke Marina" (remix)	Emil Mohammed	Emil Mohammed, Ranjith, Maqbool, Ramshiva
2012	Sooriya Nagaram	"Manmadha Kadhal"	Ron Ethan Yohann	Sujatha
2012	Sooriya Nagaram	"Kalyanamaam"	Ron Ethan Yohann	
2012	Sooriya Nagaram	"Unnai Pirivena"	Ron Ethan Yohann	Chinmayi
2012	Aathi Narayana	"Twinkle Twinkle"	Srikanth Deva	Suchitra
2012	Vazhakku Enn 18/9	"Oru Kural"	R. Prasanna	Rita
2012	Kalakalappu	"Ava Thirumbipaarthu"	Vijay Ebenezer	Anitha Karthikeyan
2012	Kandathum Kanathathum	"Idhu Yennada Mayam"	VA Charlie	
2012	Marupadiyum Oru Kadhal	"Kalloori Kaatrae"	Srikanth Deva	
2012	Eppadi Manasukkul Vanthai	"En Kadhal"	A. J. Daniel	
2012	Thiruthani	"Nee Enakku Nee Enakku"	Perarasu	Saindhavi
2012	Mayilu	"Nammaloda Paattuthan"	Ilaiyaraaja	Tippu
2012	Vavval Pasanga	"Kanne En Kannil"	Jerome Pushparaj	
2012	Kozhi Koovuthu	"Vaadamallikari"	E. S. Ramraj	Anuradha Sriram
2013	Alex Pandian	"Thaka Thayya"	Devi Sri Prasad	Karthi, Santhanam
2013	Moondru Per Moondru Kaadhal	"Mazhai Mazhai"	Yuvan Shankar Raja	Shweta Mohan
2013	David	"Mannamey"	Prashant Pillai	
2013	David	"Mannamey" (Dub Step Version)	Prashant Pillai, Remixed by Dub Sharma	
2013	Settai	"Arjuna Arjuna"	S. Thaman	Suchitra
2013	Thillu Mullu	"Ragangal Padhinaru"	Yuvan Shankar Raja, M. S. Viswanathan	
2013	Pattathu Yaanai	"Enna Oru Enna Oru"	S. Thaman	
2013	Ambikapathy	"Parakka Seivaai"	A. R. Rahman	Mili Nair
2013	Mathapoo	"Avaarampoo Onnu"	Velayudham	
2013	Irandaam Ulagam	"Kanimozhiye"	Harris Jayaraj	
2013	Arrambam	"En Fuse Pochu"	Yuvan Shankar Raja	Ramya NSK
2013	Endrendrum Punnagai	"Ennatha Solla"	Harris Jayaraj	Haricharan, Velmurugan, Ramesh Vinayakam
2013	Pannaiyarum Padminiyum	"Kaadhal Vandhaacho"	Justin Prabhakaran	Prashanthini
2013	Sillunu Oru Sandhippu	"Minminiye"	F. S. Faizal	Manotaangy
2013	Sundaattam	"Adi Unnale"	Britto Michael	
2013	Karuppampatti	"Hai Papapa"	Kannan	Sayanora Philip
2013	Karuppampatti	"Oh Indira"	Kannan	Sayanora Philip
2013	Isakki	"Kandukonden"	Srikanth Deva	
2013	Ponmaalai Pozhudhu	"Iravugalil"	C. Sathya	Steeve Vatz
2013	Ya Ya	"Oru Kannadiya"	Vijay Ebenezer	
2013	Naveena Saraswathi Sabatham	"Nenjankuzhi"	Prem Kumar	Pooja Vaidyanath
2013	Naveena Saraswathi Sabatham	"Nenjankuzhi" (II)	Prem Kumar	Pooja Vaidyanath
2013	Thagaraaru	"Thiruttu Payapulla"	Dharan	
2013	Kolagalam	"Sema Sema"	Bharani	
2014	Malini 22 Palayamkottai	"Madharthammai"	Aravind–Shankar	Sripriya
2014	Idhu Kathirvelan Kadhal	"Maelae Maelae"	Harris Jayaraj	
2014	Pulivaal	"Neelangarayil"	N. R. Raghunanthan	Saindhavi
2014	Jeeva	"Ovvundraai Thirudugiraai"	D. Imman	Bhavya Pandit
2014	Manja Pai	"Sattena"	N. R. Raghunanthan	
2014	Megha	"Enna Vendum"	Ilaiyaraaja	Priyadarshini
2014	Bramman	"Un Kannai Parthale"	Devi Sri Prasad	M. M. Manasi
2014	Azhagiya Pandipuram	"Nenje Nenje"	Bharadwaj	Shweta Mohan
2014	Chandra	"Dhiranana Dhiranana"	Gautham Srivatsa	
2014	Kandharvan	"Nerupai"	Alex Paul	
2014	Thalaivan	"Siru Paarvai"	Vidyasagar	Vandana Srinivasan
2014	Vallavanukku Pullum Aayudham	"Otrai Dhevathai"	Siddharth Vipin	
2014	Poovarasam Peepee	"En Ulagam"	Aruldev	
2014	Poovarasam Peepee	"Gnayiru Dhinangalin (Version 2)"	Aruldev	
2014	Un Samayal Arayil	"Therintho Theriyamalo"	Ilaiyaraaja	Ramya NSK
2014	Pappali	"Nee En Aruge"	Vijay Ebenezer	Shweta Mohan
2014	Burma	"Kalavu Pona Nilavu"	Sudharshan M Kumar	
2014	Aranmanai	"Katthi Parvakkaari"	Bharadwaj	Surmukhi Raman
2014	Rettai Vaalu	"Maalai Soodiya"	V. Selvaganesh	M. M. Manasi
2014	Vennila Veedu	"Silu Silu Mazhaiyum"	Dhanraj Manickam	
2014	Poojai	"Verarum Kandhirathe"	Yuvan Shankar Raja	Pooja Vaidyanath
2014	Jaihind 2	"Ivan Yaarivan"	Arjun Janya	Priya
2014	Jaihind 2	"Adada Nenjil Adada"	Arjun Janya	Saindhavi
2014	Vizhi Moodi Yosithaal	"Jill Endra Megam"	B. Aathif	
2014	Mosakutty	"Kalla Payalae Payalae"	Ramesh Vinayakam	
2014	Ra	"Varuvayo Thaen Malai Eval"	Raj Aryan	
2014	Ra	"Devathai"	Raj Aryan	
2015	Isai	"Adho Vaanile Nila"	S. J. Suryah	Chinmayi
2015	Yennai Arindhaal	"Mazhai Vara Pogudhe"	Harris Jayaraj	Emcee Jesz
2015	O Kadhal Kanmani	"Aye Sinamika"	A. R. Rahman	
2015	O Kadhal Kanmani	"Parandhu Sella Vaa"	A. R. Rahman	Shashaa Tirupati
2015	Massu Engira Maasilamani	"Naan Aval Illai"	Yuvan Shankar Raja	Chinmayi
2015	Inimey Ippadithaan	"Inimey Ippadithaan"	Santhosh Dayanidhi	
2015	Baahubali	"Pachchai Thee"	M. M. Keeravani	Damini
2015	Orange Mittai	"Theeraadhae Aasaigal"	Justin Prabhakaran	
2015	Urumeen	"Siru Nadai"	Achu Rajamani	
2015	Thoppi	"Ichu Ichu"	Ramprasad Sundar	Shweta Mohan
2015	Thottal Thodarum	"Penne Penne"	P. C. Shivan	Vandana Srinivasan
2015	Pulan Visaranai 2	"Idhu Thanneera"	Joshua Sridhar	Vasundara Das
2015	Pulan Visaranai 2	"Ennai Kandu"	Joshua Sridhar	Joshua Sridhar, Mathangi
2015	Pulan Visaranai 2	"Manaseegamanavale"	Joshua Sridhar	Shalini
2015	Pulan Visaranai 2	"Sozhavanthan"	Joshua Sridhar	Anuradha Sriram
2015	Touring Talkies	"Aasaimugam"	Ilaiyaraaja	
2015	Sagaptham	"Karichan Kuruvi"	Karthik Raja	Chinmayi
2015	Iruvar Ondranal	"Va Va Oviya"	Guru Krishnan	
2015	Kalai Vendhan	"Aedho Ondru Nenjukulla"	Srikanth Deva	Chinmayi
2015	Savaale Samaali	"Ethanai Kavignen"	S. Thaman	
2015	Sivappu	"Kodhikudhu Manasu"	N. R. Raghunanthan	Shreya Ghoshal
2015	Pallikoodam Pogamale	"Deivatthai Parthathillai"	Samson Kottoor	
2016	Gethu	"Adiyae Adiyae"	Harris Jayaraj	Pop Shalini
2016	Kanithan	"Modern Ponnathan"	Sivamani	Runa Sivamani, Blaaze
2016	Bangalore Naatkal	"Naan Maati Konden"	Gopi Sundar	
2016	Sethupathi	"Hawa Hawa"	Nivas K. Prasanna	Saindhavi
2016	Kathiravanin Kodai Mazhai	"Pothi Vacha"	Sambasivam	A. Parvathi
2016	Oyee	"Thendral Varum Vazhiyil"	Ilaiyaraaja	
2016	Thozha	"Puthitha"	Gopi Sundar	
2016	Thozha	"Nagarum"	Gopi Sundar	
2016	Oru Naal Koothu	"Patta Podunga Ji"	Justin Prabhakaran	Padmalatha, Nelson Venkatesan
2016	Jackson Durai	"Yethetho"	Siddharth Vipin	
2016	Vidayutham	"Engaio"	Mithun Eshwar	Shweta Mohan
2016	Arthanari	"Kai Veesi Nadakkum"	V. Selvaganesh	M. M. Manasi
2016	Adhagappattathu Magajanangalay	"Yaenadi"	D. Imman	Shreya Ghoshal
2016	Navarasa Thilagam	"Ayyayyo Vasama"	Siddharth Vipin	Sunitha Sarathy
2016	Narathan	"Mayakkara Manmadha"	Mani Sharma	Ramya NSK
2016	Narathan	"Mayakkara Manmadha" (Remix)	Mani Sharma	Ramya NSK
2016	Oru Melliya Kodu	"Yaar Indha Velvettu"	Ilaiyaraaja	Priya Himesh
2016	Oru Melliya Kodu	"Oru Melliya Kodu"	Ilaiyaraaja	Ramya NSK
2016	Tamilselvanum Thaniyar Anjalum	"Maya O Maya"	Karthik	
2016	Tamilselvanum Thaniyar Anjalum	"Venmegangal"	Karthik	Sricharan Kasturirangan, Megha
2016	Tamilselvanum Thaniyar Anjalum	"Kalakku (I Like It)"	Karthik	Deepak, Baba Sehgal
2016	Dharma Durai	"Naan Kaatrilae"	Yuvan Shankar Raja	
2016	Aandavan Kattalai	"Imsai Rani"	K	
2016	Devi	"Pesamal Pesi Parthen"	Vishal Mishra	
2016	Pazhaya Vannarapettai	"Friendship"	Jubin	Jackstyles
2016	Achamindri	"Pappa Pappa"	Premgi Amaren	Ramya NSK
2017	Singam 3	"Mudhal Murai"	Harris Jayaraj	Harish Raghavendra, Shweta Mohan, Ramya NSK
2017	Singam 3	"Wi Wi Wi Wifi"	Harris Jayaraj	Christopher Stanley, Nikhita Gandhi
2017	Santhanathevan	"Jallikattu"	Yuvan Shankar Raja	Senthil Dass
2017	Thiruttu Payale 2	"Neenda Naal"	Vidyasagar	Shweta Mohan
2017	Kadhal Kan Kattudhe	"Kadhale"	Pavan	
2017	Maanagaram	"Yendi Unna Pidikkuthu"	Javed Riaz	
2017	Paakanum Pola Irukku	"Kuppamma Magale"	Aruldev	Hema Desai
2017	Aayirathil Iruvar	"Ponna Pathi Sollava"	Bharadwaj	
2017	Indrajith	"Aayiram Thamarai"	KP	Shilvi Sharon
2017	Annadurai	"Thangama Vairama"	Vijay Antony	Ananthu, Vijay Antony
2017	Kalavaadiya Pozhuthugal	"Azhagazhage"	Bharadwaj	Janani Bharadwaj, Kanmani
2017	Kalavaadiya Pozhuthugal	"Thayavu Seithu"	Bharadwaj	Sunitha Menon, Rekha
2018	Aaruthra	"Chellama"	Vidyasagar	Varsha Ranjith
2018	Aaruthra	"Aaruthram"	Vidyasagar	Sriram, Narayanan Ravishankar
2018	Sollividava	"Paan Banaras"	Jassie Gift	Priya Himesh
2018	Melnaattu Marumagan	"Yaroival"	V. Kishorkumar	
2018	Bhaskar Oru Rascal	"Ippodhu Yen"	Amresh Ganesh	
2018	Seyal	"Neeva Uyre"	Siddharth Vipin	Chinmayi
2018	Enga Kattula Mazhai	"Adada Kadhal"	Srivijay	
2018	Maniyar Kudumbam	"Sleepi Kanda Meenu"	Thambi Ramaiah	Chinmayi
2018	Odu Raja Odu	"Bum Ha Rum"	Tosh Nanda	Shweta Mohan, Abishek
2018	Saamy Square	"Amma Amma"	Devi Sri Prasad	
2018	Chekka Chivantha Vaanam	"Praaptham"	A. R. Rahman	A. R. Rahman
2019	Sandham- Symphony Meets Classical Tamil	"Yathum Oore Anthem"	Raleigh Rajan	Bombay Jayashree
2019	Peranbu	"Anbe Anbin"	Yuvan Shankar Raja	Yuvan Shankar Raja
2019	Kanne Kalaimaane	"Sevvandhi Poove"	Yuvan Shankar Raja	Pragathi Guruprasad
2019	Gilli Bambaram Goli	"Vaanam Pola Vaazha Ninaithen"	Y. R. Prasad	Rita
2019	Kolaigaran	"Idhamaai Idhamaai"	Simon K. King	Keerthana Vaidyanathan
2019	Vennila Kabaddi Kuzhu 2	"Orasatha Di"	V. Selvaganesh	Shweta Mohan
2019	Unarvu	"Naanum Neeyum"	Nakul Abhyankar	
2020	Silence	"Pudhu Unarve"	Gopi Sundar	Harini
2020	Chiyangal	"Otti Otti Naanum Vaaren"	Muthamil	Priya Himesh
2020	Chiyangal	"Otti Otti Naanum Vaaren" (II)	Muthamil	
2021	Navarasa	“Thooriga”	Karthik	
2021	Navarasa	“Alai Alayaaga"	Karthik	
2021	Navarasa	“Naanum”	Karthik	
2021	Navarasa	”Adhirudha”	Karthik	
2021	Kutty Story	"Maayangal"	Karthik	Nakul Abhyankar, Krishna.K
2022	Onai	"Thumkeshwari"	Sachin-Jigar	Anusha Mani
2022	Onai	"Ennakai Pirathavale Neeya"	Sachin-Jigar	
2022	Maayon	"Thedi Thedi"	Ilaiyaraaja	Srinisha Jayaseelan
2022	Kodai	"Unnai Pathi Mulusa"	Subash Kavi	Vandana Srinivasan
2022	Jothi	"Povadhengey"	Harshavardhan Rameshwar	
2022	Yaaro	"Mozhiyellam Mounam"	Jose Franklin	Manasi
2022	Sagunthalavin Kadhalan	"Enakka Ketan"	P.V. Prasath	
2022	Desiya Thalaivar	"Engal Thevaree"	Ilaiyaraaja	
2022	Clap	"Unnai Keta"	Ilaiyaraaja	
2022	Mofussil	"Veyile Veyile (Siru Siru)"	Aruldev	Malathy
2023	Varisu	"Vaa Thalaivaa"	S. Thaman	Shankar Mahadevan, Deepak Blue, Thaman S, Aravindh Srinivasan
2023	Ninaivellam Neeyada	Minnal Pookkum Undhan Kangal	Ilaiyaraaja	
2023	Hi Naana	"Amizhdhe Nee"	Hesham Abdul Wahab	
2023	Kabadi Bro	"Yetho Mayakkam"	A. J. Daniel	Chinmayi
2023	Saandrithazh	"En Urava"	Baiju Jacob	
2023	Adipurush	"Ram Sita Ram"	Sachet–Parampara	
2023	Miss Shetty Mr Polishetty	"Lady Luck"	Radhan	Vivek
2023	Dhruva Natchathiram	"Oru Manam"	Harris Jayaraj	Shashaa Tirupati
2023	Vallan	"Kanjaadai Poova"	Santhosh Dhayanidhi	Rakshita Suresh
2023	Animal	"Pogaadhe"	Shreyas Puranik	Mohan Rajan
2023	Kodai	"Unna Pathi Mulusa"	Subash Kavi	Vandana Srinivasan
2023	Ariyavan	"Ailasa Alaka"	Giri Nandh	Sri Nisha
2023	Memories	"Nenjaaliye"	Gavaskar Avinash	
2024	Merry Christmas	"Kaanadha Kaadhal"	Pritam	
2024	Chellakutty	"Kanden Naan"	T. S. Muralidharan	
2024	Joshua: Imai Pol Kaakha	"Naan Un Joshua"	Karthik	
2024	Joshua: Imai Pol Kaakha	"Joshua Siru Paerasai"	Karthik	Keerthana Vaidyanathan, Niranja Ramanan
2024	The Family Star	"Kalyani Vaccha Vaccha"	Gopi Sundar	
2024	Brother	"Amudha Amudha"	Harris Jayaraj	Ahana Balaji, Bhargavi Sridhar
2024	Saamaniyan	"Oli Veesum"	Ilaiyaraaja	
2024	Chennai City Gangsters	"Meyya Mummari"	D. Imman	
2025	Tharunam	"Kaatrai Ketten"	Darbuka Siva	
2025	Vallan	"Kanjaadai Poova"	Santhosh Dhayanidhi	Rakshita Suresh
2025	Rajabheema	"Thooya"	Simon K. King	Keerthana
2025	Peranbum Perungobamum	"Oru Manaiviyai"	Ilaiyaraaja	Vibhavari Apte Joshi
2025	Peranbum Perungobamum	"Nanban Illa Vazhkai"	Ilaiyaraaja	Vibhavari Apte Joshi
2025	Bomb	"Innum Ethana Kaalam"	D. Imman	Shweta Mohan

== Telugu songs ==
Year	Film	Song	Composer(s)	Co-singer(s)
2001	Takkari Donga Chakkani Chukka	"Nee Mokkukunna"	A. R. Rahman	
2001	Paravasam (D)	"Aksharalu"	A. R. Rahman	
2001	12B (D)	"Naalo Ee Mounam"	Harris Jayaraj	
2001	12B (D)	"Muddu Muddu"	Harris Jayaraj	
2002	Amrutha (D)	Sundari Janta	A. R. Rahman	
2002	Baba (D)	Shaktini Ivvu	A. R. Rahman	
2002	Neetho Cheppalani	"Prema Koraku Jeevinchu"	Koti	
2002	Roja Poolu (D)	College Rootullo	Bharadwaj	
2002	Indra	"Ayyo Ayyo Ayyo"	R. P. Patnaik	
2002	Allari Ramudu	"Bodduni Chudayyo"	R. P. Patnaik	
2002	Thotti Gang	kannepilla are	Devi Sri Prasad	
2002	Vasu	"Vaale Vaale"	Harris Jayaraj	Uncredited
2002	Neetho	"Dil Dil Dil"	Vidyasagar	
2002	Run (D)	"Toorupu Veedullo"	Vidyasagar	
2003	Nee Manasu Naaku Telusu	"Edho Edho Naalo"	A. R. Rahman	
2003	Naaga	"Oka Konte Pillane"(Version ll)	Deva	
2003	Naaga	"Megam Karigenu"	Deva	
2003	Okkadu	"Hai Re Hai"	Mani Sharma	
2003	Raghavendra	"Sarigama Padanisa"	Mani Sharma	
2003	Shambu	"Dosedu Mallelu"	Ilaiyaraaja	
2003	Shambu	"Maceony Kanipeta"	Ilaiyaraaja	
2003	Shambu	"Lovely Leela"	Ilaiyaraaja	
2003	Ela Cheppanu	"Rangula Taaraka"	Koti	
2003	Ela Cheppanu	"Aa Navvulo Emundo"	Koti	
2003	Boys	Girl Friend	A. R. Rahman	
2003	Boys	Ale Ale	A. R. Rahman	
2003	Boys	Maro Maro	A. R. Rahman	
2003	Pilisthe Palukutha	"Navve Muddu"	M. M. Keeravani	
2003	Pilisthe Palukutha	"Rotte Kavalante"	M. M. Keeravani	
2003	Pilisthe Palukutha	"Bujjulu Bujjulu"	M. M. Keeravani	
2003	Okariki Okaru	"Naadir Dina"	M. M. Keeravani	
2003	Neeku Nenu Naaku Nuvvu	"Nenu Neekevarani"	R. P. Patnaik	
2003	Vijayam	"Nijamena Nijamena"	Koti	Shreya Goshal
2004	7G Brundavan Colony	"Kannula Bashalu"	Yuvan Shankar Raja	
2004	Anji	"Gumma Gulabi"	Mani Sharma	Shalini Singh
2004	Athade Oka Sainyam	"Aey Apparao"	S. V. Krishna Reddy	Sunitha
2004	Dosth	"Sorry Cheppi"	Koti	
2004	Dosth	"Jeevitham Oka"	Koti	
2004	Dosth	"Ippasara Kottaro"	Koti	
2004	Kushi Kushiga	"Chamanthi Poobanthi"	S. A. Rajkumar	Sujatha, Tippu
2004	Lakshmi Narasimha	"Naathoti Neeku"	Mani Sharma	Mahalakshmi Iyer
2004	Love Today	"Sunday"	Vidyasagar	
2004	Malliswari	"Nuvventha Andhagathi"	Koti	
2004	Naani	"Naani Vayase"	A. R. Rahman	
2004	Nenu	"Endhuku Endhuku"	Vidyasagar	
2004	Nenu	"Choosthu Choosthune"	Vidyasagar	
2004	Nenu	"Dikkulne Daatindhi"	Vidyasagar	
2004	Shankar Dada M.B.B.S.	"Naa Pere Kanchana"	Devi Sri Prasad	Malathi
2004	Varsham	"Kopama Naa Paina"	Devi Sri Prasad	Shreya Ghoshal
2004	Venky	"Anaganaga Kadhala"	Devi Sri Prasad	Sumangali
2004	Yuva (D)	"Hey Good Bye"	A. R. Rahman	Shankar Mahadevan
2004	Yuva (D)	"Jana Gana Mana"	A. R. Rahman	A. R. Rahman
2005	Athadu	Pilichina	Mani Sharma	
2005	Athanokkade	Amma Devudo	Mani Sharma	
2005	Bhadra	Emaindhi Siru	Devi Sri Prasad	
2005	Bhageeratha	O Prema	Chakri	
2005	Bunny	Va Va Vare Va	Devi Sri Prasad	
2005	Vennela	Super Model	Mahesh Shankar	
2005	Chandramukhi (D)	Annagari Maata	Vidyasagar	
2005	Ghajini (D)	Oka Maaru Kalisina	Harris Jayaraj	
2005	Preminchi Chudu (D)	Enno Ennenno	Harris Jayaraj	
2005	Jalakanta (D)	Pori Singari	Harris Jayaraj	
2005	Jalakanta (D)	Urike O Chilaka	Harris Jayaraj	
2005	Jai Chiranjeeva	"Maha Muddochesthu"	Mani Sharma	
2005	Naa Alludu	Are Sayare	Devi Sri Prasad	
2005	Narasimhudu	Muddoche Kopalu	Mani Sharma	
2005	Nuvvostanante Nenoddantana	Niluvadhamu Ninu Epudaina	Devi Sri Prasad	
2005	Oka Oorilo	"Aakashamlo"	Devi Sri Prasad	
2005	Naa Oopiri	"Nimishame"	Deepak Dev	
2005	Naa Oopiri	"Koncham Koncham"	Deepak Dev	
2005	Naa Oopiri	"Oka Puvvula"	Deepak Dev	
2005	Evadi Gola Vaadidhi	"Thak Thak Thayya"	Kamalakar	
2005	Evadi Gola Vaadidhi	"Kala Kadhuga Cheliaya"	Kamalakar	
2006	10th Class	"Kannulu Rendu"	Mickey J Meyer	
2006	10th Class	"Oohala pallaki"	Mickey J Meyer	
2006	Asadhyudu	"Kalisina Samayana"	Chakri	
2006	Devadasu	"Adigi Adagalekha"	Chakri	
2006	Game	"Uyyale Uyyale"(Version l)	Joshua Sridhar	
2006	Game	"Masthu Mega City"	Joshua Sridhar	
2006	Game	"Aatalu Adukundham"	Joshua Sridhar	
2006	Game	"Uyyale Uyyale"(Version ll)	Joshua Sridhar	
2006	Happy	"Happy Papaki"	Yuvan Shankar Raja	
2006	Pokiri	"Chudodantunna"	Mani Sharma	
2006	Pothe Poni	"Cheliya Cheliya"	Mickey J Meyer	
2006	Pothe Poni	"Premisthene"	Mickey J Meyer	
2006	Maa Iddari Nadhya	"O Manasa"	R. P. Patnaik	
2006	Raraju	"Yentata Yentata"	Mani Sharma	
2006	Sainikudu	"Orugalluke Pilla"	Harris Jayaraj	
2006	Style	"Yedhalo Yedho"	Mani Sharma	
2006	Style	"Thadava Thadava"	Mani Sharma	
2006	Style	"Merupai Saagara"	Mani Sharma	
2007	Sunny	Ninnu kore	Ilaiyaraaja	
2007	Sunny	Sayankala Sandhya	Ilaiyaraaja	
2007	Sunny	Adharam Adharam	Ilaiyaraaja	
2007	Aata	Hoyna	Devi Sri Prasad	
2007	Aadavari Matalaku Arthale Verule	Naa Manasuki	Yuvan Shankar Raja	
2007	Aadavari Matalaku Arthale Verule	Manasa manni	Yuvan Shankar Raja	
2007	Athidhi	Khiladi Koona	Mani Sharma	
2007	Lakshmi Kalyanam	"Avva Avva Avva"	R. P. Patnaik	
2007	Bheema (D)	Kanu Choopulatho	Harris Jayaraj	
2007	Bharani (D)	Sayya Sayya	Yuvan Shankar Raja	
2007	Deva (D)	Ora Kannulatho	Yuvan Shankar Raja	
2007	Deva (D)	Devudu malachina	Yuvan Shankar Raja	
2007	Dubai Seenu	Once Upon A Time	Mani Sharma	
2007	Happy Days	Arere Arere	Mickey J Meyer	
2007	Happy Days	O My Friend	Mickey J Meyer	
2007	Happy Days	Ninna Chusi		
2007	Lakshyam	Chekkarakeli	Mani Sharma	
2007	Gurukanth (D)	Ade Aata Paisalatho	A. R. Rahman	
2007	Munna	Chammakuro	Harris Jayaraj	
2007	Neevalle Neevalle (D)	Neevalle Neevalle	Harris Jayaraj	
2007	Raghavan (D)	Paccha Velugu	Harris Jayaraj	
2007	Drohi (D)	Dagudu Moothalu	Harris Jayaraj	
2007	Notebook	Puttadibomma	Mickey J Meyer	
2007	Veduka	Kanulu Palike Vela	Anoop Rubens	
2007	Yogi	Orori Yogi	Ramana Gogula	
2009	Blue (D)	"Chiggy Wiggy"	A. R. Rahman	
2010	Ragada	Bholo Astalakshmi	S. Thaman	
2010	Ragada	Em Pillow Yapillo	S. Thaman	
2010	Happy Happy Ga	Gundello	Mani Sharma	
2010	Nene Ambani (D)	Alalade Paperne Nanu	Yuvan Shankar Raja	
2010	Orange	"Chilipiga"	Harris Jayaraj	
2010	Orange	"Ye Vaipuga"	Harris Jayaraj	
2010	Brindavanam	Nijamena	S. Thaman	
2010	Khaleja	Makathika Maya	Mani Sharma	
2010	Thakita Thakita	Manase Ato Ito	Bobo Shashi	
2010	Young India	"Kanulatho Raase Tholi Kavitha"	M. M. Keeravani	Sravana Bhargavi
2010	Villain	Usure Poyene	A. R. Rahman	
2010	Awaara (D)	Chuttesai Bhoomi	Yuvan Shankar Raja	
2010	Maro Charitra	Prema Prema	Mickey J Meyer	
2010	Maro Charitra	Ye Theega Puvvuno	Mickey J Meyer	
2010	U & I	U & I	Karthik.M	
2010	Sneha Geetham	"Oka Snehame"	Sunil Kashyap	
2010	Sneha Geetham	"Vasantham"	Sunil Kashyap	
2010	Bheemili Kabaddi Jattu	"Pada Pada"	V. Selvaganesh	
2010	Bheemili Kabaddi Jattu	"Naalo Parugulu"	V. Selvaganesh	
2010	Bheemili Kabaddi Jattu	"Jathara"(Nidadholu Pilla)	V. Selvaganesh	
2010	Jhummandi Naadam	Balamani	M. M. Keeravani	
2010	Vedam	Vedam	M. M. Keeravani	
2010	Chalaki	Edo Jarigandante	V. Harikrishna	
2010	Rama Rama Krishna Krishna	Rama Rama	M. M. Keeravani	
2010	Rama Rama Krishna Krishna	Endhukila	M. M. Keeravani	
2010	Rama Rama Krishna Krishna	Yeh Mera chanti	M. M. Keeravani	
2010	Prasthanam	Nee Rendallo	Mahesh Shankar	
2010	Varudu	Relare Relare	Mani Sharma	
2010	Sadhyam	Asalemaindhe	Chinni Charan	
2010	Gaayam 2	Rama rajyam	Ilaiyaraaja	
2010	Om Shanti	Ottesi chebutha	Ilaiyaraaja	
2010	Ye Maaya Chesave	Swaasye	A. R. Rahman	
2010	Ye Maaya Chesave	Vintunnava	A. R. Rahman	
2010	Namo Venkatesa	Non Stop	Devi Sri Prasad	
2011	Manchivadu	Edi Aa Vennela	Sirpy	
2011	Manchivadu	Dum Dum Laka	Sirpy	Anitha, Madhavapeddi Satyam
2011	Manchivadu	Edi Aa Vennela Pathos	Sirpy	
2011	Veedinthe (D)	Manasa Paikegire	Yuvan Shankar Raja	
2011	Oh My Friend	Oh Oh My Friend	Rahul Raj	
2011	Mogudu	Choosthunna	Babu Shankar	
2011	Mogudu	Eppudu Nee	Babu Shankar	
2011	Mogudu	Choosthunna (Fusion mix)	Babu Shankar	
2011	7th Sense (D)	Mutyala Dharani	Harris Jayaraj	
2011	Pilla Zamindar	Oopiri Adadhu	Selvaganesh	
2011	Dookudu	Chulbuli	S. Thaman	
2011	Dookudu	Adara adara	S. Thaman	
2011	Vachadu Gelichadu	Andala Bala	S. Thaman	
2011	Keratam	Sadhyamena	Joshua Sridhar	
2011	Keratam	Nidhure chedire	Joshua Sridhar	
2011	Mugguru	Gilli Gilli	Koti	
2011	Mugguru	Oja ye oja	Koti	
2011	Mugguru	Chikibumbum	Koti	
2011	Dhada	Godava Godava	Devi Sri Prasad	
2011	Kandireega	Champakamala	S. Thaman	
2011	Naa Peru Shiva	Manase Guvvai	Yuvan Shankar Raja	
2011	Sega	Padham Vidichi	Joshua Sridhar	
2011	180	Nee Maatalo	Sharreth	
2011	Veera	Chitti Chitti	S. Thaman	
2011	Veera	Chinnari	S. Thaman	
2011	Veera	Hossanam	S. Thaman	
2011	Mr. Perfect	Badhulu Thochani	Devi Sri Prasad	
2011	Vastadu Naa Raju	Yedho Yedho	Mani Sharma	
2011	Anaganaga O Dheerudu	Chandamamala	Mickey J Meyer	
2011	Mirapakay	Adigora Choodu	S. Thaman	
2011	Mirapakay	Gadi Thalapula	S. Thaman	
2011	Priyudu	Chaitrama	Mohan Jona	
2012	Ko Antey Koti	Aagipo	Shaktikanth Karthik	
2012	Yamudiki Mogudu	Jhanak Jhanak	Koti	
2012	Yeto Vellipoyindhi Manasu	Yenthentha	Ilayaraja	
2012	Yeto Vellipoyindhi Manasu	Nachaledhu	Ilayaraja	
2012	Yeto Vellipoyindhi Manasu	Koti koti tarallona	Ilayaraja	
2012	Routine Love Story	Vela Talukutaarale	Mickey J Meyer	
2012	Routine Love Story	Nee varasa neede	Mickey J Meyer	
2012	Dhamarukam	Aruna Dhavala	Devi Sri Prasad	
2012	Thuppakki	Mari Selavika	Harris Jayaraj	
2012	Bus Stop	Rekkalochina	J.B	
2012	Lucky	Nee Mounam	Sai Karthik	
2012	Lucky	Sariga choosthe	Sai Karthik	
2012	Brothers (D)	Rani Nanni	Harris Jayaraj	
2012	Brothers (D)	Yevaro yevaro	Harris Jayaraj	
2012	Rebel	Deepali	Raghava Lawrence	
2012	Life Is Beautiful	Emundo	Mickey J Meyer	
2012	Ok Ok (D)	Kalala Oka Devathe	Harris Jayaraj	
2012	Uu Kodathara? Ulikki Padathara?	Anuragame Haaratulaaye	Bobo Shashi	
2012	Tuneega Tuneega	Dhigu Dhigu Jabili	Karthik Raja	
2012	Tuneega Tuneega	Ahista Ahista	Karthik Raja	
2012	Gabbar Singh	Dilse Dilse	Devi Sri Prasad	
2012	Ninnu Choosthe Love Vasthundi (D)	Lolita	Harris Jayaraj	
2012	Ninnu Choosthe Love Vasthundi (D)	Rimujimu	Harris Jayaraj	
2012	Mr. Nookayya	Pista Pista	Yuvan Shankar Raja	
2012	Mr. Nookayya	No Money No Honey	Yuvan Shankar Raja	
2012	Ekaveera	Veera Veera	Karthik	
2012	Poola Rangadu	Nuvve Nuvvele	Anoop Rubens	
2012	Nippu	Nena Ninnu	S. Thaman	
2012	Love Failure (D)	Inthajare Inthajare	S. Thaman	
2012	SMS (Siva Manasulo Sruthi)	Idhi Nijamey	V. Selvaganesh	
2012	Bodyguard	Yevvaro	S. Thaman	
2013	Tadakha	Subhanallah	S. Thaman	
2013	Varna	Tholi Merupa	Harris Jayaraj	
2013	Varna	Paalalle	Harris Jayaraj	
2013	Action	"Swathi Muthyapu"	Bappi Lahiri	
2013	Park	Gunde Sadi	M. M. Srilekha	
2013	Park	First time	M. M. Srilekha	
2013	Intinta Annamayya	"Narayanaya"	M. M. Keeravani	
2013	Intinta Annamayya	"Venkatadri Samam"	M. M. Keeravani	
2013	Intinta Annamayya	"Chandamava Raavo"	M. M. Keeravani	
2013	Intinta Annamayya	"Ayameva"	M. M. Keeravani	
2013	Intinta Annamayya	"Telisthe Moksham"	M. M. Keeravani	
2013	Sri Jagadguru Aadi Sankara	"Om Namashivaya"	Nag Srivatsa	
2013	Bad Boy	Thaka Thayya	Devi Sri Prasad	
2013	Race	Prapanchame	Vivek Sagar	
2013	Mr. Pellikoduku	O Meri Siri Siri	S. A. Rajkumar	
2013	3G Love	Ee Kala Ela	Sekhar Chandra	
2013	Okkadine	Seethakoka	Karthik	
2013	Okkadine	Hola Hola	Karthik	
2013	Seethamma Vakitlo Sirimalle Chettu	"Yem Cheddam"	Mickey J Meyer	
2013	Seethamma Vakitlo Sirimalle Chettu	"Vaana Chinukulu"	Mickey J Meyer	
2013	Seethamma Vakitlo Sirimalle Chettu	"Meghallo Sannaayi"	Mickey J Meyer	
2014	Ghatana	"Yennali"	Aravind–Shankar	Sripriya
2014	Lakshmi Raave Maa Intiki	"Aa Venneladaina"	KM Radhakrishna	Sunitha
2014	Power	"Champesinde"	S. Thaman	
2014	Rabhasa	Hawa Hawa	S. Thaman	
2014	Ulavacharu Biryani	Telisi Teliyandila	Ilaiyaraaja	
2014	Current Theega	Pilla O Pilla	Achu Rajamani	
2014	Current Theega	Kallalo Vunna Prema	Achu Rajamani	
2014	Sikandar (D)	Thanu Gorantha	Yuvan Shankar Raja	
2014	Alludu Sreenu	Neeli Neeli Kanullo	Devi Sri Prasad	
2014	Drushyam	Prathi Roju Pandaga	Sharreth	
2014	Ra Ra Krishnayya	Hero Hero	Achu Rajamani	
2014	Rowdy	Nee Meeda Ottu	Sai Karthik	
2014	Potugadu	Devatha	Achu Rajamani	
2014	Nenem…Chinna Pillana?	Kallalo Nuvve	M. M. Srilekha	
2014	Yevadu	Nee Jathaga	Devi Sri Prasad	
2015	Akhil	Padessavae	Thaman S	
2015	Courier Boy Kalyan	Maya O Maya	Karthik; Anup Rubens	
2015	Courier Boy Kalyan	Mandu Mandu	Karthik; Anup Rubens	
2015	Courier Boy Kalyan	Bangaramma	Karthik; Anup Rubens	
2015	Seenugadi Love Story (D)	Vaale Vaale Guvvale	Harris Jayaraj	
2015	Shivam	Shivam Shivam	Devi Sri Prasad	
2015	Bhale Bhale Magadivoy	Hello Hello	Gopi Sundar	
2015	Bhale Bhale Magadivoy	Bhale Bhale	Gopi Sundar	
2015	Bhale Bhale Magadivoy	How How	Gopi Sundar	
2015	Yentha Vaadu Gaani	Mabbulu Kammeley	Harris Jayaraj	
2015	Baahubali: The Beginning	Pachcha Bottesina	MM Keeravani	
2015	O Manasa	"Neetho Mudipadiponi"	MS Sahaja Rao	
2015	O Manasa	"Ninu Naalo Dachukunna"	MS Sahaja Rao	
2015	O Manasa	"Elaa Nijam Chesukonu"	MS Sahaja Rao	
2015	Rakshasudu	Mass; Nee Needavutha	Yuvan Shankar Raja	
2015	Kerintha	"Mila Mila"	Mickey J Meyer	
2015	Kerintha	"Sumagandhala"	Mickey J Meyer	
2015	Ok Bangaram	Aye Amaayika	A.R Rahman	
2015	Ok Bangaram	Neetho Ala	A.R Rahman	
2015	Ok Bangaram	Maayedo Cheyava	A.R Rahman	
2015	Surya vs Surya	"Vennellona"(Duet Version)	Satya Mahaveer	
2016	Okka Ammayi Thappa	"Druvam Druvam"	Mickey J Meyer	
2016	Drishya Kavyam	"Bramham Okkade"	Kamalakar K	
2016	Vennello Hai Hai	"Tholi Choopuke"	Chakri	
2016	Vennello Hai Hai	"Subame Sumame"	Chakri	
2016	Seethamma Andalu Ramayya Sitralu	"Okko Nakshatram"	Gopi Sunder	
2016	Premam	"Prema Pusene"	Gopi Sunder	
2016	Premam	Ninna Leni	Gopi Sunder	
2016	Jaguar	Ma Ma Mama Seetha	S. Thaman	
2016	Abhinetri	Aakasham Lo	Vishal Mishra	
2016	Jo Achyutananda	Aakupachanni	Kalyan Koduri	
2016	Jakkanna	Nijanga	Dinesh Kanagaratnam	
2016	Gentleman	Gusa Gusa Lade	Mani Sharma	
2016	Brahmotsavam	Aata Paatalaadu	Mickey J Meyer	
2016	Supreme	Anjaneyudu Neevadu	Sai Karthik	
2016	Sarrainodu	Athiloka Sundari	S. Thaman	
2016	Oopiri	Oka Life	Gopi Sunder	
2016	Oopiri	Eppudu	Gopi Sunder	
2016	Abbayitho Ammayi	Maatallo Cheppaleni	Ilaiyaraaja	
2016	Nenu Sailaja	Em Chepanu	Devi Sri Prasad	
2016	A Aa	Anasuya kosam	Mickey J Meyer	
2016	A Aa	Yellipoke Syamala	Mickey J Meyer	
2017	London Babulu	"Ekkada Ekkada"	K	
2017	MCA	"Yemaindo Teliyadu Naaku"	Devi Sri Prasad	
2017	Seetha Ramuni Kosam	"Hrudayam Vellipothunda"	Anil Gopi Reddy	
2017	Malli Raava	"Chinuku"(Version l)	Shravan Bharadwaj	
2017	Indrasena (D)	"Vajrama Mutyama"	Vijay Antony	
2017	S3 Yamudu 3 (D)	"Wi Wi Wi Wi Wifi"	Harris Jayaraj	
2017	S3 Yamudu 3 (D)	"Musi Musi"	Harris Jayaraj	
2017	Yuddham Sharanam	"Neevalaney"	Vivek Sagar	
2017	Ninnu Kori	"Unnattundi Gunde"	Gopi Sunder	
2018	2 Friends	"Preminchaa"		
2018	Saamy (D)	"Amma Amma"	Devi Sri Prasad	
2018	Devadas	"Hey babu"	Mani Sharma	
2018	RX 100	"Adire Hrudayam"	Chaitan Bharadwaj	
2018	Pantham	"Iam Sorry"	Gopi Sundar	
2018	Kannullo Nee Roopamey	"Cheli Neeve Naa Pranam"	Saketh Komanduri	
2018	Vijetha	'Minsarey Minsarey"	Harshavardhan Rameshwar	
2018	Ala	"Avuna Nena"	Srinivasa Sarma Rani	
2018	Jambalakadi Pamba	"Dhooram Dhooram"	Gopi Sundar	
2018	Sathya Gang	"Kanule Chusina"	Prabhas Nimmala	
2018	Naa Nuvve	"Chiniki Chiniki"	Sharreth	
2018	Idi Naa Love Story	"Ye nimishamlo"	Srinath Vijay	
2019	Madhanam	"Chandamama"	Ron Ethan Yohann	
2019	Hippi	"Yavathive"	Nivas K. Prasanna	
2019	Maharshi	"Nuvvani Idi Needani"	Devi Sri Prasad	
2019	Killer	"Mellaga Mellaga"	Vijay Antony	
2019	Suryakantham	"Po Pove"	Mark K Robin	
2020	Life Anubhavinchu Raja	"Edo Edo Kotha Hai"	Ram	Shweta Mohan
2020	Manavi Aalakincharadhatae	"Anthele Anthele"	Sandy Addanki	
2021	Shyam Singha Roy	"Tara"	Mickey J Meyer	
2021	Paagal	"Saradhaga Kaasepaina"	Radhan	Poornima
2021	Kanabadutaledu	"Yedakemai Untunde"	Madhu Ponnas	
2021	Raja Vikramarka	"Sammathame"	Prashanth R Vihari	Shashaa Tirupati
2021	Marakkar: Lion of the Arabian Sea (D)	"Kallaninda Kalalu"	Ronnie Raohael	Shweta Mohan
2021	Mr Lonely	"Vellipomake"	Aravind Chebolu	
2021	Bathuku Busstand	"Baapu Garu Lekha"	Mahavir	
2021	Maro Prema Katha	"Nanne Choodava"	Prashnath BJ	
2022	Vikrant Rona (D)	”Sakkanamma”	B. Ajaneesh Loknath	Vijay Prakash, Harshika Devanath
2022	Thank You	"Title Song"	Thaman S	
2022	Bhediya (D)	Thumkeshwari	Sachin-Jigar	Anusha Mani
2022	Bhediya (D)	Chilipi Varaale Ivvu	Sachin-Jigar	
2022	Vaade Veedu	"Vennela Nee Kannula"	M L Raja	
2022	Varma	"Gundelona Nuvve"	Ravi Shankar	
2022	Clap	“Chinna Maata”	Ilaiyaraaja	
2022	Swa	"Ningina Jarina"	Karanam Sri Raghavendra	Nada Priya
2022	Rowdy Boys	"Nuvve Na Dhairyam"	Devi Sri Prasad	
2022	777 Charlie (D)	"Life Of Charlie"	Nobin Paul	
2023	Animal (D)	Ney Veyrey	Shreyas Puranik	
2023	Joruga Hushaaruga Shikaaru Poddama	Happy Journey	Naga Vamshi	
2023	Dhruva Nakshathram (D)	Oka Madi	Harris Jayaraj	Shweta Mohan
2023	Aaakasam Dhaati Vasthaava	Unnano Leno	Karthik	
2023	Miss Shetty Mr Polishetty	Lady Luck	Radhan	
2023	Hi Nanna	"Adigaa"	Hesham Abdul Wahab	
2023	Month of Madhu	"Oh Na Madhu"	Achu Rajamani	Yamini Ghantasala
2023	Prem Kumar	"Sundari"	Ananth Srikar	
2023	Ustaad	"Chukkalonchi"	Akeeva B	
2023	Natho Nenu	"Jathaga Neetho"	Satya Kashyap	
2023	Ninnu Chere Tharunam	"Neetho"	Karthik Kumar Rodriguez	
2023	Virupaksha	"Nachavule Nachavule"	B. Ajaneesh Loknath	
2023	Anni Manchi Sakunamule	"Title song"	Mickey J. Meyer	
2023	Adipurush	"Priya Mithunam"	Ajay-Atul	Shweta Mohan
2023	Adipurush	"Ram Sita Ram"	Sachet–Parampara	
2023	Vidudhala Part 1 (D)	"Pillalu Nadisthe"	Ilaiyaraaja	Ananya Bhat
2023	Popcorn	"Hey Kandireega"	Shravan Bhardwaj	
2023	Writer Padmabhushan	"Manninchava Amma"	Shekar Chandra	
2024	Roti Kapda Romance	"Oh My Friend"	Harshavardhan Rameshwar	
2024	Rewind	"Love At First Sight"	Ashirvad Luke	
2024	Saripodhaa Sanivaaram	"Sa Ri Ma Pa"	Jakes Bejoy	
2024	Committee Kurrollu	"Aa Rojulu Malli Raavu"	Anudeep Dev	
2024	Purushothamudu	"Ila Ila"	Gopi Sundar	Ayyan Pranathi
2024	The Family Star	Kalyani Vaccha Vaccha	Gopi Sundar	Mangli
2024	Siddharth Roy	"Life Is This Beautiful"	Radhan	Srinisha Jayaseelan
2025	Dear Uma	"Yevaipuko"	Radhan	Harini Ivaturi
2025	14 Days Girlfriend Intlo	"LUV Song"	Mark K. Robin	
2025	Game Changer	"NaaNaa Hyraanaa"	Thaman S	Shreya Ghoshal
2025	Neeli Megha Shyama	"Neeli Meghamanthata"	Shravan Bharadwaj	
2025	Oh Bhama Ayyo Rama	"Na Chelive"	Radhan	
2025	The 100	"Aakaasame"	Harshavardhan Rameshwar	
2025	Shashtipoorthi	"Veyi Venuvulu"	Ilaiyaraaja	Vibhavari Apte Joshi
2025	Oka Brundavanam	"Ne Ikapai"	Sunny–Saketh	
2025	Oka Brundavanam	"Kagithala NavaleIvi"	Sunny–Saketh	
2025	23 Iravai Moodu	"Bangaram Akkarleni"	Mark K Robin	Ramya Behara
2025	Meghalu Cheppina Prema Katha	"Gala Gala"	Justin Prabhakaran	Chinmayi Sripada
2026	Sathi Leelavathi	"Madhuram"	Mickey J. Meyer	Charulatha Mani
2026	Mareechika	"Andhee Andhani Andham"	Ilaiyaraaja	Shweta Mohan

== Kannada songs ==
Year	Film	Song	Music director	Co-singer(s)
2004	Jyeshta	"Lolaku Jhumuki Itte"	S. A. Rajkumar	Rajesh Krishnan, Kalpana
2005	Yashwanth	"Mannige Mara Bhaarave"	Mani Sharma	Solo
2005	Yashwanth	"Nodanna"	Mani Sharma	Solo
2005	Shambhu	"Enu Enu"	Ramesh Krishnan	Solo
2005	Sakha Sakhi	"Bandaalapo Bandalo"	Sadhu Kokila	Nanditha, Archana
2006	Dattha	"Escapeu Maamu"	R. P. Patnaik	Solo
2006	Neenello Naanalle	"Nooraaru Hrudayagalalli"	Ramesh Krishna	Sumangali
2006	Aishwarya	"Dhoni Dhoni"	Rajesh Ramanath	Solo
2006	Jothe Jotheyali	"Sikthaare Sikthaare"	V. Harikrishna	Solo
2006	Ravi Shastri	"Bandithe"	Rajesh Ramanath	Malathi
2006	Student	"Maama Maama"	R. P. Patnaik	Solo
2006	Odahuttidavalu	"En Chandano"	R. P. Patnaik	Sunitha
2006	Tenali Rama	"Hoyo Maana"	R. P. Patnaik	Mano
2006	Tenali Rama	"O Maina"	R. P. Patnaik	Mano
2006	Tenali Rama	"Maadaithe"	R. P. Patnaik	Sunitha
2007	Hani Hani	"Dhinaku Dhina"	S.Chinna	Solo
2007	Geleya	"Hudugi Malebillu"	Mano Murthy	Priya Himesh
2007	Snehana Preethina	"Osi Osi"	V. Harikrishna	Shreya Ghoshal
2007	Vidhyarthi	"Yaarammi"	R. P. Patnaik	Solo
2007	Orata I Love You	"Manasaitu"	Shankar GR	Solo
2007	Savi Savi Nenapu	"Naa Naana"	R. P. Patnaik	Solo
2007	Nali Naliyutha	"Baanina Chandranu"	Rajesh Ramanath	Nanditha
2007	Santha	"Dhava Dhava"	Gurukiran	Solo
2007	Pallakki	"Goli Maaro"	Gurukiran	Solo
2007	Manmatha	"Hunnime Banna"	Bharathi Das	Solo
2007	Arasu	Kannu Kannugala Sere	Joshua Sridhar	
2008	Mussanje Maathu	"Anuraaga Aralo Samaya"	Sridhar V Sambhram	Solo
2008	Satya in Love	"Thaane Thanthaane"	Guru Kiran	Solo
2008	Pallavi Illada Charana	"Pallavi Nanna"	Babji-Sandeep	Anuradha Bhat
2008	Slum Bala	"Manassu"	Arjun Janya	Nanditha Das
2008	Navagraha	"Smileo Re"	V. Harikrishna	Jassie Gift, Tippu, Chaitra
2008	Nanda Loves Nanditha	"Jinke Marina"	Emil	Emil, Ranjith Govind, Srinivas
2008	Nanda Loves Nanditha	"Preethi Bandaithe"	Emil	Shahanaj
2008	Honganasu	"Lagge Lagge Sahyaadrige"	Hamsalekha	Dr.K S Chitra
2008	PUC	"Edeyaantharaaladalli"	J Raviraj	Shwetha
2008	PUC	"Naaviruvudu Heege"	J Raviraj	Shwetha
2008	Varasadara	"Enidu Idu"	Rajesh Ramanath	Solo
2008	Sangama	"Madhu Maasa"	Devi Sri Prasad	Solo
2008	Baba	"Kanasaage Barthaane"	Trishul	Dr.Shamitha Malnad
2008	Bindaas	"Nalle Nalle"	Gurukiran	Mathangi
2008	Anthu Inthu Preethi Banthu	"Nee Chumu Chumu"	Gurukiran	Chaitra H. G.
2008	Shivani	"Kaddu Nodala"	James Sakaleshpur	Solo
2008	Kodagana Koli Nungitha	"Ninge Kane"	Sadhu Kokila	Solo
2008	Gooli	"Sum Sumne Yaako"	Anoop Seelin	Nanditha Das
2008	Mast Maja Maadi	"Chori Chori"	PB Balaji	Chinmayi
2008	Rocky	"Ring Ring"	Venkat-Narayan	Solo
2009	Savaari	"Ale Ale"	Manikanth Kadri	Rita
2009	Devru	"Doora Swalpa Doora"	Sadhu Kokila	Shreya Ghoshal
2009	Male Bille	"Naanu Ninna"	Manikanth Kadri	Solo
2009	Kabadi	"Mutte Mutte"	Hamsalekha	Solo
2009	Rajakumari	"Rangi Rangi"	V. Harikrishna	Solo
2009	Shivamani	"Modamodala"	Veer Samarth	Shreya Ghoshal
2009	Yogi	"Neenomme"	Emil	Solo
2009	Gokula	"Baruve Odi Odi"	Mano Murthy	Rithisha Padmanabh
2009	Gokula	"Maja Maadoke"	Mano Murthy	Rithisha Padmanabh
2009	Gilli	"Kannina Bhaashe"	Yuvan Shankar Raja	Solo
2009	Dubai Babu	"Abdullah"	Sridhar V Sambhram	Solo
2009	Abhay	"Abhay is Crazy"	V. Harikrishna	Solo
2009	Samagama	"Ankura Premankura"	Kiran	Anuradha Bhat
2009	Thabbali	"Mani Mani"	AM Neel	Solo
2009	Yagna	"Kogileye"	Murali Krishna	Solo
2009	Ghauttham	"Kaabul Draakshi"	Guru Kiran	Anuradha Sriram
2009	House Full	"Manadalli Muchchitta"	Kiran	Anuradha Bhat
2009	Jhossh	"Thanthaane Thannamthaane"	Vardhan	Solo
2009	Jolly Days	"Raktha Sambandha"	Mickey J Meyer	Solo
2009	Jolly Days	"Saluge Saluge"	Mickey J Meyer	Solo
2009	Venki	"Arere Eno"	AM Neel	Solo
2009	Circus	"Baaro Geleya"	Emil	Emil
2009	Hrudayadali Idenidu	"Baa Baaro"	Dharma Prakash	Solo
2009	Vayuputra	"Bhagavantha Bhagavantha Banda"	V. Harikrishna	With Chorus Singers
2009	Jaaji Mallige	"Cheluve Bramhana Bali"	Sadhu Kokila	Shreya Ghoshal
2009	Jaaji Mallige	"Olave"	Sadhu Kokila	Shreya Ghoshal
2009	Jaaji Mallige	"Manassu"	Sadhu Kokila	Solo
2009	Abhimaani	"Chennagide"	Dharma Teja	Nanditha
2009	Raam	"Dhum Dol Bajare"	V. Harikrishna	Nanditha
2009	Kaaranji	"Ee Dina Hosadaagide"	Veer Samarth	Solo
2009	Bhagyada Balegara	"Ghallu Ghallenutha"	Ilayaraja	Manjari
2009	Salute	"Heegene"	Sai Karthik	Dr.K S Chitra
2009	Ullasa Utsaha	"Hello Namaste"	G. V. Prakash Kumar	Solo
2009	Ullasa Utsaha	"O Prema"	G. V. Prakash Kumar	Solo
2009	Love Guru	"Hudugaata Aadi"	Joshua Sridhar	Solo
2009	Love Guru	"Yaaru Kooda"	Joshua Sridhar	Benny Dayal
2009	Iniya	"Iniya Iniya"	Sridhar V Sambhram	Anuradha Bhat
2009	Chamkaisi Chindi Udaysi	"Jaya Ho"	Mast PB Balaji	Komal Kumar
2010	Suryakaanti	"Mouni Mouni"	Ilayaraja	Solo
2010	Suryakaanti	"Mouni Naanu"	Ilayaraja	Solo
2010	Aptharakshaka	"Kabaadi Kabadi"	Gurukiran	Dr.Shamitha Malnad
2010	Aithalakkadi	"Naanu Neenu"	Sadhu Kokila	Solo
2010	Devadas	"Bengaluru"	Joshua Sridhar	Solo
2010	Devadas	"Ko Ko"	Joshua Sridhar	Shweta Mohan
2010	Devadas	"Sayyare"	Joshua Sridhar	Shweta Mohan
2010	Krishna Nee Late Aagi Baaro	"Kanasidu Alli"	Praveen Godkhindi	Solo
2010	Maduve Mane	"Kanne Koodiruvaaga"	Manikanth Kadri	Solo
2010	Mathe Mungaru	"Chita Pata"	X Paul Raj	Shreya Ghoshal
2010	Taare	"Kanassu Kandaagide"	CR Babbi	Solo
2010	Varsha Dhaare	"Maha Bramhachaari"	Ajaneesh Loknath	Solo
2010	Gandedhe	"Ninna Kadeya"	Chakri	Solo
2010	Parole	"Mujugara Muddada"	K Mithran	Anuradha Bhat
2010	Antharathma	"Salaam Salaam"	Giridhar Diwan	Mangala
2010	Huduga Hudugi	"Danthada Bombenaa"	Joshua Sridhar	Kavitha
2010	Huduga Hudugi	"Thunta Thunti"	Joshua Sridhar	Solo
2010	Huduga Hudugi	"Huduga Hudugi"	Joshua Sridhar	Suvi Suresh
2010	Porki	"Dheera Dheera"	Mani Sharma	Sowmya Mahadevan
2010	Gubbi	"Ee Pari"	Arjun Janya	Solo
2010	Gubbi	"Modala Todala"	Arjun Janya	Solo
2010	Nannavanu	"Hey Maamu"	Ilayaraja	Tippu
2010	Preethi Hangama	"Himse Himseno"	Raj Kiran	Chaitra
2010	Preethi Hangama	"Moda Modalu"	Raj Kiran	Nanditha
2010	Gaana Bajaana	"Hosadondu Hesaridu"	Joshua Sridhar	Shweta Mohan
2010	Gaana Bajaana	"Naanu Eega"	Joshua Sridhar	Solo
2010	Coffee Shop	"Howwa Howwa"	S. A. Rajkumar	Rajalakshmi
2010	Mr. Theertha	"Hudugi Hudugi"	Gurukiran	Chaitra
2010	Nam Areal Ond Dina	"Kaapaadiko"	Arjun Janya	Dr.Shamitha Malnad
2010	Nam Areal Ond Dina	"Nenape"	Arjun Janya	Solo
2010	Prithvi	"Nenapidu Nenapidu"	Manikanth Kadri	Shruthi Haasan
2011	Sankranthi	"Akasha Kanyena"	Sridhar V Sambhram	Solo
2011	Hare Rama Hare Krishna	"Angel Angel"	Ilayaraja	Rita
2011	Double Decker	"Thunta"	Purandar jaipal	Vijay Shankar
2011	Mallikarjuna	"Chanda O Chanda"	S. A. Rajkumar	Priya Himesh
2011	Mallikarjuna	"Shuruvaayithe"	S. A. Rajkumar	Rita
2011	Uyyale	"Moda Modalu"	DJ Ricky	Solo
2011	Prema Chandrama	"Ondanondu"	V. Harikrishna	Shankar Mahadevan
2011	Onde Ondu Saari	"Onde Ondu Saari"	M Rajesh	Solo
2011	Ellellu Neene Nannallu Neene	"Yaaralu Helada"	Vijaya Bharathi	Solo
2011	Olave Mandara	"Shreeki Nimmonu"	Deva	Solo
2011	Prema Chandrama	"Ondanondu"	V. Harikrishna	Shankar Mahadevan
2011	Kanteerava	"Cheluve Cheluve"	Chakri	Solo
2011	Yogaraj But	"Sihiyagide"	Milind Dharmasena	Solo
2011	Aantharya	"Ellargu Ellide"	Giridhar Diwan	Solo
2011	Achchu Mechchu	"Hey Olave"	AM Neel	Anuradha Bhat
2011	Dandam Dashagunam	"Marali Marali"	V. Harikrishna	Solo
2011	Dhool	"Hindilla Mundilla"	V. Harikrishna	Solo
2011	Bodyguard	"Jhulu Jhulu"	Vinay Chandra	Solo
2011	Bodyguard	"Kempaaithu"	Vinay Chandra	Anuradha Bhat
2012	Romeo	"Thunthuru"	Arjun Janya	
2012	Narasimha	"Dhahana Dhahana"	Hamsalekha	Suchithra
2012	Toofan	"Raagadanthe"	Ellwyn Joshua	Solo
2012	18th Cross	"Thirugu Thirugu"	Arjun Janya	Solo
2012	Alemari	"Maribeku"	Arjun Janya	Solo
2012	Ko Ko Koli Kothi	"Mellane"	Ramana Gokula	Sunitha
2012	Prasad	"O Nanna Kanda"	Ilayaraja	Solo
2012	Prasad	"O Nanna Kanda" (Bit Version)	Ilayaraja	Solo
2012	Preethiya Loka	"Ee Preethi"	Sai Kiran	Shreya Ghoshal
2012	Yaare Koogadali	"Yaarivanu Yaarivanu"	V. Harikrishna	Anuradha Bhat
2012	Yaare Koogadali	"Yaarivano Yaarivano" (Different Version)	V. Harikrishna	Sonu Nigam, Anuradha Bhat
2013	Gang Leader	"Cheluvayya Cheluvo"	Abhimann Roy	M N Anusha
2013	Gombegala Love	"Ayyo Namage"	Srinath Vijay	Solo
2013	CID Eesha	"James Bondigintha"	Vijaya Bharathi	Solo
2013	Mandahasa	"Yaarigu Kaanada"	Veer Samarth	Mahalakshmi Iyer
2013	Cool Ganesha	"Jigi Jigide"	Manikanth Kadri	Solo
2013	Bulbul	"Ondu Sanje"	V. Harikrishna	Solo
2013	Andhar Bahar	"Aasae"	Vijay Prakash	Anuradha Bhat
2014	Tirupathi Express	"Usire Usire Vandisu"	Arjun Janya	Chinmayi
2014	Naan Maadid Thappa	"Naa Ninna"	Aarya	Solo
2015	Ranna	"Jagadoddarana"	V. Harikrishna	Vani Harikrishna
2015	Vajrakaya	"Kandamma Muddamma"	Arjun Janya	
2015	Rana Vikrama	"Gowri Gowri"	V. Harikrishna	Priya Himesh
2015	Endendigu	"Endendigu"	V. Harikrishna	
2015	Prema Pallakki	"Parichayisu"	Vineeth Raj Menon	Anuradha Bhat
2015	Buguri	"Kannalle"	Mickey J Meyer	Shivani
2015	Arjuna	"Sakhiye Sakhiye"	Arjun Janya	
2015	Luv U Alia	"Kanase Kanninda"	Jassie Gift	Shreya Ghoshal
2015	Ranna	"Kondu hoge"	Sridhar V Sambhram	Sridhar V Sambhram
2015	Kendasampige	"Nenape Nithya Mallige"	V. Harikrishna	
2015	Sharp Shooter	"Kannale"	M.S.Shiva Santosh	Shreya Ghoshal
2016	Game	"Hoovinda Hoovige Kavana" "Ondu Manjina bindu"	Ilayaraja	Anuradha Bhat
2016	Krishna-Rukku	"Saaku Saakinnu"	V. Sridhar	Anuradha Bhat
2016	Shivalinga	"Bombe"	V. Harikrishna	Vani Harikrishna
2016	Jwalantham	"Maathe Marethoyithu"	Vikram Subramanya	
2016	Ricky	"Malage Malage"	Arjun Janya	Ankita Kundu
2016	Doddmane Hudga	"Kanasive Nooraru"	V. Harikrishna	Anuradha Bhat
2016	Jaguar	"Mamaseetha"	S. Thaman	Megha
2016	U The End A	"Neenene Nanna Radhe"	Manu Sri	Shruthi VS
2016	Badmaash	"Mayavi Kanase"	Judah Sandhy	Shreya Ghoshal
2016	Viraat	"Mathella Marethe hoythu"	V. Harikrishna	Anuradha Bhat
2016	Style King	"Nanage Nanage"	Arjun Janya	Solo
2016	Lakshmana	"Nenne Monne"	Arjun Janya	Sri Raksha Achar
2017	Melkote Manja	"Kanmucchi Nenedaga" "Manshangirodu(male)"	Giridhar Diwan	
2017	Raaga	"Manasina"	Arjun Janya	Anuradha Bhat
2017	Bangara s/o Bangarada Manushya	"Aakasha Modalinda"	V. Harikrishna	
2017	Srikanta	"Onondsari"	B. Ajaneesh Loknath	Shilpa Srikanth
2017	Saheba	"Saheba" "Thera Haadu"	V. Harikrishna	
2017	Kidi	"Ondu Manavi"	Emil Mohammed	
2017	Satya Harishchandra	"Ninna Hinde"	Arjun Janya	
2018	Brihaspathi	"Ontharadalli Ella Haayagide"	V. Harikrishna	
2018	Prema Baraha	"Paan Banaras"	Jassie Gift	Priya Himesh
2018	Churikatte	"Hoguva Munna"	Vasuki Vaibhav	
2018	Naanu L/O Jaanu	"Bhoomi Achegide Mouna"	Srinath Vijay	
2018	Edakallu Guddada Mele	"Mugulu Nage"	Ashic Arun	Shreya Ghoshal
2019	Galaate	"Yenu Maayada"	Jessie Gift	Solo
2023	Animal (D)	"Naa Bere Nee Bere"	Shreyas Puranik	Solo
2026	Brindavihari	"Jeeva Jeeva"	Hesham Abdul Wahab	Solo

== Malayalam songs ==
Song	Film	year	Co-Singer(s)	lyrics	Music director
James Bond	CID Moosa	2003	Chorus	Girish Puthenchery	Vidyasagar
Ore Swaram	Ivar	2003	Sreenivas, Sreelekha Parthasarathy	BR Prasad	Sreenivas
Pallaakku	Shambu	2004	Manjari (Indian singer)	Kaithapram	Jassie Gift
Kuttaalam Kuruvi [M]	Kaakkakarumban	2004	Girish Puthencherry	M Jayachandran	
Kelkkaathoru sangeetham	Vesham	2004	Sujatha Mohan	Kaithapram	SA Rajkumar
Chellamani	Ennittum	2006		Kaithapram	Jassie Gift
Akale akale	Akale	2004	Gireesh Puthenchery	M Jayachandran	
Maarimazha	Rasikan	2004	Chorus	Veena Gireesh Puthenche	Vidyasagar
Oslama	Runway	2004		Gireesh Puthenchery	Suresh Peters
Chirichenne Kudukkiya Midukkanalle	Thudakkam	2004	KS Chithra	Kaithapram	Berny Ignatius
Ithile Nee Enthe Vannilla	Manjupoloru Penkutti	2004	Jyotsna	Kaithapram	Alphonse Joseph
Nee En Sundari	Sathyam	2004	KS Chithra	Kaithapram	M Jayachandran
Kinaavin Kilikale	Kochi Rajavu	2005	Manjari	Gireesh Puthenchery	Vidyasagar
Neru parayatte ...	Manju Peyyum Mumpe (Dubbing)	2005		Mankombu Gopalakrishnan	MM Sreelekha
Aey ponnu sare ...	Brahmam (Dubbing)	2005	KS Chithra	Mankombu Gopalakrishnan	Devi Sri Prasad
Mele vellithingal ...	Thanmathra	2005	Meenu	Kaithapram	Mohan Sithara
Parayaathe Ariyaathe [M]	Udayananu Tharam	2005		Kaithapram	Deepak Dev
Parayaathe Ariyaathe [D] [Version 2]	Udayananu Tharam	2005	KS Chithra	Kaithapram	Deepak Dev
Masti masti (M) ...	Vacation	2005		Sohan Roy	Kaithapram Viswanath
Masti Masti [D] ...	Vacation	2005	Karthik, Sumitha	Sohan Roy	Kaithapram Viswanath
Maymaasam ...	Alice In Wonderland	2005	Cicily, Karthik	Gireesh Puthenchery	Vidyasagar
Butterfly ...	Pachakkuthira	2006	Bhavatharani, Karthik	Gireesh Puthenchery	Ilayaraja
Ilaya Manmadha (D) ...	Lanka	2006	Cicily, Karthik	BR Prasad	Sreenivas
Pooncholai Kiliye ...	Keerthichakra	2006	Asha Menon, Karthik	Sivanthi	Joshua Sreedhar
Kaaveri Nadiye ...	Keerthichakra	2006	Asha Menon, Karthik	Gireesh Puthenchery	Joshua Sreedhar
Neeyennomal ...	Athisayan	2007		Vayalar Sarathchandra Varma	Alphonse Joseph
Neelakkurinji ...	Smart City	2006	Sujatha Mohan	Shibu Chakravarthy	Manikanth Kadri
Dapu Dapudu ...	Challenge (dubbing from Sye)	2007	Karthik, Shobha	Siju Thuravoor	MM Keeravani
Om giridhaari	Heart Beats	2007	Kalyani Menon	Gireesh Puthenchery	George Peter
Ayyayyo	Happy Days	2006		Rajiv Alunkal	Mickey J Meyer
Arikil Nee ...	Flash	2007		Rafeeq Ahamed	Gopi Sundar
Snehathin Koodonnu ...	College Kumaaran	2008	Aparna	Shibu Chakravarthy	Ouseppachan
Puthiyoreenam ...	Cycle	2008	Vineeth Sreenivasan	Anil Panachooran	Mejo Joseph
Neelaraavin ...	Anthipponvettam	2008		Dr SP Ramesh	M Jayachandran
Preyasi Paadoo ...	American Halwa	2008		Siju Thuravoor, Arshad K Rahim	Mahesh Shankar
Nee Nilaavo ...	Gopaalapuraanam	2008	Jyotsn	S Ramesan Nair	MD Rajendran, Sudhamsu Younuseo
Neelanilaavo ...	Gopaalapuraanam	2008		MD Rajendran	Sudhamsu Younuseo
We Are In Love ...	Minnaminnikkoottam	2008	Vineeth Sreenivasan, Karthik, Sayanora Philip, Soumya Ramakrishnan	Anil Panachooran	Bijibal
Seetharamam kadhasusaaram ...	Seethaa Kalyanam	2009	Madhu Balakrishnan, Sharreth, Anuradha Sriram, Karthik	BR Prasad	Sreenivas
Kaivala Thattalle ...	Mussafir	2013(released)		Capt Suneer Hamsa	Ouseppachan
Etho Januvary Maasam [M] ...	Orkkuka Vallappozhum	2009		Gireesh Puthenchery	M Jayachandran
Aazhithirathannil ...	Bhaagyadevatha	2009		Vayalar Sarathchandra Varma	Ilayaraja
Aakaasha Megham ...	Dr Patient	2009		Joffy Tharakan	Bennett, Veetrag
Maamarangale [D] ...	Ee Pattanathil Bhootham	2009	Sayanora Philip, Anakha Sadan	Gireesh Puthenchery	Shaan Rahman
Neelathaamarayaay ...	Neelathaamara	2009		Vayalar Sarathchandra Varma	Vidyasagar
Pular Manju [Perillaaraajyathe] ...	Body Guard	2010	Elizabeth Raju	Kaithapram	Ouseppachan
Manjumazha ...	Aagathan	2010	Kaithapram	Ouseppachan	
Kaattumaakkaan ...	Paappee Appachaa	2010	Chorus, Geemon	Gireesh Puthenchery	Vidyasagar
Aarume Kaanaathe ...	Mummy and Me	2010		Vayalar Sarathchandra Varma	Sejo John
Kizhakkummala Kammalitta ...	Kadha Thudarunnu	2010		Vayalar Sarathchandra Varma	Ilayaraja
Aaru Ninne Snehichaalum ...	Love Guru	2010	V Devanand	Santhosh Varma	Joshua Sreedhar
Maanathe ...	Apoorvaraagam	2010	Ranjith Govind, Yasir Sali	Santhosh Varma	Vidyasagar
Kannolam ...	Plus Two	2010	Shweta Mohan	S Ramesan Nair	Manu Ramesan
Kannolam [V2] ...	Plus Two	2010	Shweta Mohan	S Ramesan Nair	Manu Ramesan
Kannithinkal ...	Aathmakadha	2010		Engandiyoor Chandrasekharan	Alphonse Joseph
Oru Naal Annoru Naal ...	Four Friends	2010	Shweta Mohan, Vijay Yesudas	Kaithapram	M Jayachandran
Nila Nila [Unplugged] ...	Tournament	2010		Vayalar Sarathchandra Varma	Deepak Dev
Nila Nila ...	Tournament	2010	Megha	Vayalar Sarathchandra Varma	Deepak Dev
Thinkal Tholatho ...	Orange	2011		Rafeeq Ahamed	Manikanth Kadri
Thennal Chirakundo ...	Payyans	2011	Jyotsna	Kaithapram	Alphonse Joseph
Thennal Chirakundo [Unplugged] ...	Payyans	2011	Jyotsna	Kaithapram	Alphonse Joseph
Raagachandranariyaathe ...	Living Together	2011	Shweta Mohan	Kaithapram	M Jayachandran
Omanichumma ...	Casanova	2012	Vineeth Sreenivasan, Gopi Sundar, Kalyani, Karthik, Najim Arshad, Roopa Revathi	Gireesh Puthenchery	Gowri Lakshmi
Ariyumo ...	Khaddama	2011		Rafeeq Ahamed	Bennett, Veetrag
Moolippaattum Paadi ...	Makeup Man	2011	Kalyani	Kaithapram	Vidyasagar
Daffodil Poovu ...	Raghuvinte Swantham Rasiya	2011	Suchithra Karthik	Yusufali Kecheri	Sajan Madhav
Kiliyamma Koodu Koottum ...	Doubles	2011	Deepa Miriam	Vayalar Sarathchandra Varma	James Vasanthan
Ishtam Ninnishtam ...	Uppukandam Brothers Back in Action	2011	Manjari	Asha Ramesh	Alphonse Joseph
Ormakal Verodum ...	Doctor Love	2011		Vayalar Sarathchandra Varma	Vinu Thomas
Meghathoppil ...	Sevenes	2011	Rafeeq Ahamed, Santhosh Varma	Bijibal	
Aadivaa Nilaakkilee ...	Thomson Villa	2014(released)		ONV Kurup	SP Venkitesh
Kalamozhikalaaya ...	Pranayam	2011	Sharreth	ONV Kurup	M Jayachandran
Irulil Oru Kaithiri ...	Spanish Masala	2012	Vidyasagar	Irayimman Thampi, R Venugopal	Vidyasagar
Aarezhuthi Aavo ...	Spanish Masala	2012	Shreya Ghoshal	Irayimman Thampi, R Venugopal	Vidyasagar
Enthinee Mizhi Randum ...	Ordinary	2012	Shreya Ghoshal	Rajeev Nair	Vidyasagar
Sun Sun Sundari Thumpi ...	Ordinary	2012	Madhu Balakrishnan	Rajeev Nair	Vidyasagar
Veyil Pole ...	Arike	2012	Shibu Chakravarthy	Ouseppachan	
Neelavanil ...	Outsider	2012	Engandiyoor Chandrasekharan	Sangeeth	
Raagaveenayil ...	Grihanaathan	2012		Vayalar Sarathchandra Varma	Rajamani
Vellil Paravakalayee ...	Cinema Company	2012		Rafeeq Ahamed	Alphonse Joseph
Kaatharamaam ...	Ettekaal Second	2014	KS Chithra	Rafeeq Ahamed	Colin Francis, K Santhosh
Sooryane Kaithodaan ...	My Boss	2012		Santhosh Varma	Sejo John
Changaathi Padayum ...	Face 2 Face	2012	Madhu Balakrishnan, Sherdin	Anil Panachooran	Alphonse Joseph
Kannil Kannil Minnum ...	3 Dots	2013	Sujatha Mohan, Madhu Balakrishnan	VR Santhosh	Vidyasagar
Mele Meyum (Why Is The Moon) ...	3 Dots	2013	Madhu Balakrishnan.Tippu, Master K Balasubramaniam	Rajeev Nair	Vidyasagar
Enthinenthe ...	3 Dots	2013	Madhu Balakrishnan, Tippu	VR Santhosh	Vidyasagar
Mizhiyithalil ...	Lokpal	2013		Rafeeq Ahamed	Ratheesh Vegha
Palaniram Padarume ...	Ladies and Gentleman	2013	Karthik, Sooraj Santhosh	Rafeeq Ahamed	Ratheesh Vegha
Divaanishakal ...	I Love Me	2013	Shweta Mohan	Rafeeq Ahamed	Deepak Dev
Janmam tharangal il	Orissa	2013	Prakash Marar	Ratheesh Vegha	
Kulirumma nalki	Day Night Game	2013	Vayalar Sarath	Jinosh Anthony	
Orikathe Maayathe	Ezhu Sundara Rathrikal	2013	Rafeeq Ahamed	Prasanth Pillai	
Cinderella Chandame	Villali Veeran	2014	murugan Kattakada	SA Rajakumar	
Adichu Polikkan	Peruchazhi	2014	Venugopal		
Pattum chutti	Rajadhiraja	2014	BK Hari narayan	Berny Ignatius	
Chirikal poompodi	Persiakkaran	2014	Rafeeq ahamed	Renjith	
Dhoore Dhoore	Kanal attam	2014		Karthik	
Oru Thooval	love story	2014	Haseena	Joji Mathew	
Ee thanutha	Anarkali	2014	Rafeeq ahamed	Vidyasagar	
Thanne Thanne	Two Countries	2014	Bk Hari narayan	Gopi Sunder	
Mazha Thulli Thulli	Style	2015	Sathyan Anthikad	Jassie Gift	
Mazhaye mazhaye	James and alice	2015	Bk Hari narayan	Gopi Sunder	
Kaathirunna Pakshi	Kammattipadam	2015	anwar ali		K
Minunundae Mullapolae ...	Tharangam	2017	Ancy Thomas	Manu Manjith	Ashwin Renju
Ee Kaattu	Adam Joan	2017	Bk Hari narayan	Deepak Dev	
Ithrakkum	Bobby	2017	S Ramesan Nair	Devika Murali	
Pokkiri	Pokkiri Simon	2017	Bk Hari narayan	Gopi Sunder	
Aazhilullil	Kammarasambhavam	2018	Bk Hari narayan	Gopi Sunder	
Ini Oru Kaalathu ...	Poomaram	2018	Karthik	Ajeesh Dasan	Leela L Girikkuttan
Theeram Thedum...	Gambler	2019		Swapnangalil Pankidam	
	Sreehari	2018	Nishanth Kodamana	Rajesh Babu, Shimjith Sivan	
Neramayi ...	Poomaram	2018	Karthik	Ajeesh Dasan	Faisal Razi
Neramayi Nilavili ...	Poomaram	2018	Karthik, Shreya Ghosal	Ajeesh Dasan	Faisal Razi
Kadavathoru Thoni ...	Poomaram	2018	Karthik	Ajeesh Dasan	Leela L Girikuttan
Oru Maamaram ...	Poomaram	2018	Karthik	B.K Hari Narayanan	Sayoojya Das
Ore Sooryan ...	Poomaram	2018	Karthik	Balachandran Chullikkad	Gopi Sundar
Oru nokku kaanuvaan...	Sunday Holiday	2018	Karthik	Jis Joy	Deepak Dev
Thoovennila	Mohanlal	2018	Manu Ranjith	Tony Joseph	
Kadalazham	Mandharam	2018	Vinayak Sasikumar	Mujeeb Majeed	
Vaanaville	Koode	2018	Rafeeq Ahamed	M Jayachandran	
Karineela	Joseph	2018	BK Harinarayanan	Ranjin Raj VK	
Entha née Mounam	Vijay Superum Pournamiyum	2019	Jis Joy	Prince George	
Mazha	Soothrakkaran	2019	Vichu Bala	Vichu Bala	
Mandarappo	Sakalakalashala	2019	Swetha Mohan	Aby Tom Cyriac	Aby Tom Cyriac
Suhara song (Aliyukayayi)	Shibu	2019		Manu Manjith	Sachin Warrier
Kadavule Pole	Lucifer	2019		Logan	Deepak Dev
Ne Va En Arumukha...	Varane Avashyamund	2020		Santhosh Varma, Dr. Kritaya	Alphons Joseph
Nee Vere Njan	Animal	2023		Mankombu Gopalakrishnan	Shreyas Puranik
"Roohe"	Neru	2023		Vinayak Sasikumar	Vishnu Shyam

== Hindi songs ==
Year	Film	Song	Music director	Co-singer(s)
2002	Saathiya	"Chori Pe Chori"	A.R. Rahman	
2002	The Legend of Bhagat Singh	"Shora So Pahchaniye"	A.R. Rahman	
2003	Boys (D)	"Girlfriend"	A.R. Rahman	
2003	Boys (D)	"Maro Maro"	A.R. Rahman	
2004	Yuva	"Dhakka Laga Bukka"	A.R. Rahman	
2004	Yuva	"Khuda Hafiz"	A.R. Rahman	
2004	Dil Ne Jise Apna Kahaa	"Zindagi Hai Dua"	A.R. Rahman	
2008	Ghajini	"Behka"	A.R. Rahman	
2008	Yuvvraaj	"Shanno Shanno"	A.R. Rahman	
2008	Yuvvraaj	"Shanno Shanno"(Remix)	A.R. Rahman	
2009	13B	"Bade Se Shehar"	Shankar–Ehsaan–Loy	
2009	13B	"Bade Se Shehar"(Remix)	Shankar–Ehsaan–Loy	
2009	Delhi-6	"Hey Kaala Bandar"	A.R. Rahman	
2010	Jhootha Hi Sahi	"Hello Hello"	A.R. Rahman	
2010	Raavan	"Behene De"	A.R. Rahman	
2010	Once Upon a Time in Mumbaai	"I am in Love"	Pritam	
2010	Lahore	"Ab Ye Kaafila"	M. M. Kreem	
2010	Action Replayy	"Tera Mera Pyaar"	Pritam	
2010	Action Replayy	"Tera Mera Pyaar"(Remix)	Pritam	
2011	I Am	"Aankhein"	Vivek Phillip	
2011	Force	"Chahoon Bhi"	Harris Jayaraj	
2011	Rockstar	"Sheher Mein"	A.R. Rahman	
2011	Angel	"Angel"	Amjad Nadeem	
2012	Ek Main Aur Ekk Tu	"Aahatein"	Amit Trivedi	
2013	David	"Rab Di"	Prashant Pillai	
2013	David	"Rab Di"(Reprsie)	Prashant Pillai	
2014	Kochadaiiyaan (D)	"Vaada"(Male)	A.R. Rahman	
2021	Marakkar: Lion of the Arabian Sea (D)	"Aankhon Mein"	Roniae Raphael	Shweta Mohan

== Bengali songs ==
E Gaan Amar Bajimaat (2008)

== Odia songs ==
O Soniyo Mun Heli Ti Diwana ACP Ranveer (2012)
