= Raja (Telugu actor) =

Indian actor (born 1978)

- Born: Raja Abel; 9 November 1978 (age 47); Vishakapatnam, Andhra Pradesh, India
- Years active: 2002–2013
- Spouse: Amritha Vincent (m. 2014)
- Children: 3

Raja Abel is a former Indian actor, who worked predominantly in Telugu films. He is best known for his role in the Telugu film Anand.

He debuted in 2002, playing a supporting role in the romantic comedy O Chinnadana. Since entering the industry, he has appeared in the successful films like Anand, Aa Naluguru, Vennela, and Style.

== Early and personal life ==
Raja was born as Raja Abel in Visakhapatnam. He was born to a Telugu-speaking father, who was a Brahmin, and a British mother.

He canvassed in support of YSRCP, in the Indian elections of 2014. He quit cinema and is currently serving as a pastor in Hyderabad.

== Filmography ==
Year	Title	Role	Notes
2002	O Chinnadana	Srinivasa Sastri	Debut film
2003	Vijayam	Raja	
2003	Appudappudu	Sandeep	
2004	Anand	Anand	
2004	Kala	Raja	
2004	Aa Naluguru	Raja	
2004	Arjun	Uday	
2005	Vennela	Naveen	
2005	Mogudu Pellam O Dongodu	Moorti	
2005	Oka Oorilo	Ravi	
2006	Bangaram	Vinay	
2006	Kokila	Rahul	
2006	Style	Raja	
2006	Mayabazaar	Srinivas	
2007	Toss	Parasuram	
2007	Kanna	Kanna	Tamil film
2007	Veduka	Srikar	
2008	Andamaina Abaddham	Pradeep	
2008	Bhadradri	Siddhu	
2008	Idi Sangathi	Clover King	cameo appearance
2008	Mr. Medhavi	Viswaksen	
2008	Nee Sukhame Ne Koruthunna	Madhu	
2009	Sontha Ooru	Bujjigaadu	
2009	Samarthudu	Raja	
2009	Jaganmohini	Jagathalapradhapan	Tamil film
2010	Inkosaari	Ajay	
2012	Mr. Nookayya	Kiran	
2012	Nuvva Nena	Raja	
2012	Hostel Days		
2013	Oh My Love		
