= Vijayam =

2003 film by Singeetham Srinivasa Rao

- Poster
- Directed by: Singeetham Srinivasa Rao
- Written by: Singeetham Srinivasa Rao
- Dialogues by: Satyanand
- Produced by: D. Ramanaidu
- Starring: Raja
- Cinematography: Hari Anumolu
- Edited by: Krishnareddy–Madhava
- Music by: Koti
- Production company: Suresh Productions
- Release date: 9 May 2003
- Country: India
- Language: Telugu

Vijayam (transl. Victory) is a 2003 Indian Telugu-language film directed by Singeetham Srinivasa Rao and produced by D. Ramanaidu. The film stars Raja and Gajala. It was released on 9 May 2003.

== Plot ==
Raja, a tribal youth from the Araku Valley, is a bright and ambitious student studying in Visakhapatnam. His dream is to win a gold medal in academics and serve as a role model for other tribal children. During his time in college, Raja falls in love with Usha, the daughter of a wealthy businessman. Usha admires Raja for his honesty and sincerity. However, a misunderstanding arises when Usha is mistakenly informed that Raja is the son of a businessman.

When the truth about Raja's tribal background comes to light, Usha feels betrayed, believing that he deliberately concealed this information from her. Heartbroken, she distances herself from him. The remainder of the story follows Raja's journey as he strives to win back Usha's trust and approval while staying committed to his academic aspirations and proving his worth.

== Cast ==
- Raja as Raja alias Raju
- Gajala as Usha
- Giri Babu as Usha's father
- Murali Mohan as the forest officer
- Sunil as Srinivas alias Siddu
- Siva Krishna as Organic Chemistry professor
- Rajeev Kanakala as Usha's brother
- Dharmavarapu Subramanyam as the hotel manager
- Pavan as Raju's friend
- Santosh as Raju's friend
- Shadaab as Raju's friend
- Srinivasa Reddy as Raju's friend
- Manoj as Raju's friend
- Bhagavan as Raju's friend
- Suman Setty as Raju's classmate
- AVS as H. Umapathi
- Brahmanandam as Vanari
- Raghunatha Reddy as Sridhar Rao
- Ragini as Vanari's wife
- Siva Parvathi as the forest officer's wife
- Alapati Lakshmi as a tribal woman

== Production ==
Vijayam was directed by Singeetham Srinivasa Rao (who also wrote the story and screenplay, while the dialogues were written by Satyanand) and produced by D. Ramanaidu under Suresh Productions. Cinematography was handled by Hari Anumolu, and editing by the duo Krishnareddy–Madhava. Gajala was cast after Rao saw her performing in a show; she accepted the offer as Srinivasa Rao was the director of her favourite film Pushpaka Vimana (1987).

== Soundtrack ==
The soundtrack was composed by Koti. Telugucinema.com wrote, "The orchestration for all songs reminds Koti's Repallelo Radha, and a few Hindi albums. The music in the album, with a major share of melodies, might have clicked if the movie had a good talk".

Track listing
No.	Title	Singer(s)	Length
1.	"Ee Ooji Sunoji"	Mano	4:09
2.	"Nijamena Nijamena"	Karthik, Shreya Ghoshal	4:35
3.	"Kusalama"	Rajesh, K. S. Chithra	4:09
4.	"Netho Nindu"	Tippu, Shreya Ghoshal	4:09
5.	"Meghala Pallaki"	Tippu, Sunitha	4:31
6.	"Endhuko Premalo"	S. P. Balasubrahmanyam, Richi	5:20
7.	"Hampilo Silpalu"	Rajesh	4:14
Total length:			31:07

== Release and reception ==
Vijayam was released on 9 May 2003. Vijayalaxmi of Rediff.com wrote, "It is embarrassing when any filmmaker picks up a bad narrative and packs his movie with lewd comedy in the name of entertainment. But when that director is a man of the stature of Singeetham Srinivasa Rao, it is even more shocking." Sify wrote, "The major drawback of Vijayam is that the basic story has not been handled well and it is better that Singeetam goes back to comedies!"

Gudipoodi Srihari of The Hindu wrote, "Raja is at ease in most of the scenes. [Gajala] is quite cute. Muralimohan and Giribabu make their presence felt. The film is musically competent with well-scored numbers like Kusalama O Priya and Yenduko Premalo composed by Koti." Jeevi of Idlebrain.com rated the film 2.75 out of 5, calling it "Oldwine with youth label". Harikrishna of Telugucinema.com wrote, "Director no doubt has given life to an ordinary story through his screenplay. Main track story line and comedy scenes went hand in hand with the exception of few incomplete scenes".

== Controversy ==
The film involves a scene with AVS and Brahmanandam, which Priya Richi of The News Minute condemned for passing queerness as comedy. She lamented that this was an example of poor representation of the LGBTQ community in Telugu cinema.
