= Kanna (film) =

- Title card
- Directed by: Anand
- Starring: Raja; Sheela
- Cinematography: Tajmal
- Edited by: Edwin
- Music by: Ranjit Barot
- Production company: Kosmic Film Productions
- Release date: 21 December 2007
- Country: India
- Language: Tamil

Kanna is a 2007 Indian Tamil-language coming-of-age film directed by Anand, starring Raja and Sheela.

== Plot ==
The story takes place in Coimbatore, where Annapoorani, the daughter of Raghunath, a managing director of a company, has everything in life; loving family and friends and, studies in year 10 in a Catholic secondary school. She goes on a school organised educational tour to Ooty with her class mates and is accompanied by her class teacher Aashirvaatham and her biology teacher.

Whilst they were staying in a bungalow in Ooty, Poorani meets Kannaa, a florist by profession. Kannaa is introduced as Eric to the tourist group and agrees to be the group's tour guide on the request of the bungalow's caretaker. Since meeting, both Poorani and Kannaa are at loggerheads. Though Kannaa enjoys teasing her in a friendly manner knowing Poorani's wariness, Poorani seems to think that he has bad intentions. Eventually, her animosity towards him vanishes and she begins to develop an interest in him.

When Annapoorani returns to Coimbatore, she is unable to forget Kannaa and longs to be with him. One day when her friend tells her of how she is planning to meet her boyfriend in person, Poorani becomes influenced and decided to meet Kannaa in person with a gift in hand. She borrows a Scooter and leaves to Ooty. On the way, the bike breaks down, so she continues her journey on foot. In the meantime at home, her parents panic when they find that she has not returned from school and begin searching for her everywhere.

The rest of the movie depicts the learnings of Annapoorani, who is at the cusp of becoming an adult, on life and responsibilities.

== Cast ==
- Raja as Eric aka. Kannaa
- Sheela as Annapoorani aka. Poorani
- Prakash Raj as Raghunath
- Seetha as Annapoorani's mother
- Livingston as Aashirvaatham Sir
- Sona Nair as Teacher
- Crane Manohar as Bus driver

== Soundtrack ==
Soundtrack was composed by Ranjit Barot. The audio was launched on 14 November 2007 in Chennai.

- "Kuyil Paadum Paattu" – Shreya Ghoshal
- "Ragasiya Kanna" – Sujatha
- "Thullum" – Balaraman, Mahalakshmi Iyer
- "Sembaruthi" – Manikka Vinayagam, Mukesh Mohamed, Vinaya
- "Aayiram Kelvigal" – Hariharan
- "Azhagiya Penne" – Karthik

== Critical reception ==
Sify wrote, "Director Anand has come out with a sweet movie with a nice message that shows how an adolescent mind due to immaturity falls to infatuation. However the trouble with the film is that it moves at snail pace, and is made like a mushy television serial." Pavithra Srinivasan of Rediff.com said "movie that tries very hard to be subtle and sensuous, exhibiting the Art of Love but instead falls flat on its face." Anamika of Kalki praised the acting of Prakash Raj, Sheela, Tajmal's cinematography and Ranjit Barot's music but panned Raja's acting in serious scenes and Sheela's characterisation as immature; however she appreciated director Anand for taking up an risky subject in his debut film and for giving perfect ending to the film.
