= Style (2006 film) =

- Directed by: Raghava Lawrence
- Written by: Raghava Lawrence; Kulashekar (dialogues)
- Produced by: Sirisha Sridhar Lagadapati
- Starring: Prabhu Deva; Raghava Lawrence; Charmme Kaur; Raja; Kamalinee Mukherjee
- Cinematography: Kabir Lal
- Edited by: Marthand K. Venkatesh
- Music by: Mani Sharma
- Production company: Larsco Entertainments
- Release date: 12 January 2006
- Running time: 159 minutes
- Country: India
- Language: Telugu
- Box office: ₹7 crore distributors' share

Style is a 2006 Indian Telugu-language dance film written and directed by Raghava Lawrence. Produced by Larsco Entertainments, the film stars two renowned choreographers Prabhu Deva and Raghava Lawrence together, alongside Raja, Kamalinee Mukherjee and Charmme Kaur in important roles with Chiranjeevi and Nagarjuna Akkineni in cameo appearances. The soundtrack was composed by Mani Sharma.

Style garnered the Filmfare Award for Best Choreography and also won two Nandi Awards.

== Plot ==
Raghava is a cleaning boy at a dance school in Visakhapatnam, where he and his friends have been enrolled. The school is headed by Ganesh, a former dancer who became handicapped due to his rival Anthony orchestrating an accident to avenge defeat at his hands in a dance competition. Raghava and his friends begin training under Ganesh. Despite several obstacles, Raghava and his batch defeat Anthony's batch in the dance competition, where Raghava receives an offer as a dance choreographer in Chiranjeevi's upcoming film.

== Cast ==
- Prabhu Deva as Ganesh
- Raghava Lawrence as Raghava
- Raja as Raja
- Kamalinee Mukherjee as Priya, Ganesh's sister
- Charmy Kaur as Shruti
- Vernon Enthiado as Anthony
- Bhanu Chander as Raghava's father
- Jayasudha as Raghava's mother
- Narasimharaju as a doctor
- Farhad Shahnawaz as a dance Instructor
- Kovai Sarala as Raghava’s neighbour
- Dharmavarapu Subramanyam as Raghava's neighbour's husband
- Vamsi Krishna
- Ping Pong Surya
- Kondavalasa as a shop owner
- Bill Bitra

=== Cameo appearances ===
- Navneet Kaur in the song "Style Style"
- Chiranjeevi as himself
- Nagarjuna Akkineni as Mass
- Suman as Judge

== Production ==
Style was the highest budgeted dance-musical film in India at the time of its release. It was the first Indian film to be shot with Super 35 camera and also color corrected.

== Soundtrack ==
Style

Film score by Mani Sharma
- Released: 2006
- Genre: Soundtrack
- Length: 31:46
- Label: Madhura Entertainment
- Producer: Mani Sharma

Mani Sharma chronology
Ranam (2005)	Style (2006)	Veerabhadra (2006)

The music was composed by Mani Sharma. Music was released on MADHURA Entertainment Music Company.

Telugu version

No.	Title	Lyrics	Singer(s)	Length
1.	"Style Style"	Madhu	Ravi Varma	4:39
2.	"Yedalo Yedo"	Vishwa	Karthik	5:07
3.	"Rock & Roll"	Vishwa	KK, Sunitha Sarathy	4:32
4.	"Thadava Thadavaku"	Chinni Charan	Karthik, Mahalakshmi Iyer	3:29
5.	"Chiru Cheyyesthe"	Madhu	Mano	4:16
6.	"Merupisaagara"	Chinni Charan	Karthik	4:38
7.	"Ra Ra Rammantunna"	Chinni Charan	Shankar Mahadevan	5:16
Total length:				31:46

Tamil version

- "Neruppai" — Karthik
- "Style Style" — Jaigeetha, Ravivarma
- "Superstar" — Karthik
- "Unnil Ulladhu" — Karthik
- "Vaada Vaada" — Tippu
- "Yaarumillai" — Karthik

== Release ==
The film was released on 12 January 2006 and was dubbed in Tamil as Lakshyam.

== Awards ==
Filmfare Awards South

- Best Choreography - Raghava Lawrence (2006)

Nandi Awards - 2006

- Best Choreographer - Raghava Lawrence
- Best Child Actor - Master Raghava
