= Veduka =

Indian romantic drama film

- Directed by: Jithender Y.
- Written by: VSP Tenneti (dialogues)
- Screenplay by: Jithender Y.
- Produced by: Venkateswara Rao Ponnamaneni
- Starring: Raja; Poonam Bajwa
- Cinematography: Hari Anumolu
- Music by: Anup Rubens
- Production company: Akshaya Films
- Release date: 31 May 2007
- Country: India
- Language: Telugu

Veduka is a 2007 Indian Telugu-language romantic drama film directed by Jitender Y. and starring Raja and Poonam Bajwa.

== Cast ==
- Raja as Srikar
- Poonam Bajwa as Harini
- Anu Mehta
- Naresh
- K. Viswanath
- Sudha
- Satyam Rajesh
- Venky
- Pingpong Surya
- Ahuti Prasad
- Dharmavarapu Subramanyam
- M. S. Narayana
- L. B. Sriram
- Sudeepa Pinky

== Production ==
As of February 2007, 90% of the film's shooting was complete.

== Soundtrack ==
The music was composed by Anup Rubens.

== Reception ==
A critic from Rediff.com wrote that "Veduka is just a clean love story, so don't expect any fireworks. See it once if you have the time and inclination". Jeevi of Idlebrain.com wrote that "A wafer-thin story like this should be dealt with lot of skill and should be filled with tender moments. But unfortunately, it is filled with routine and predictable stuff".
