= Mamiboys =

Musical group

Mamiboy
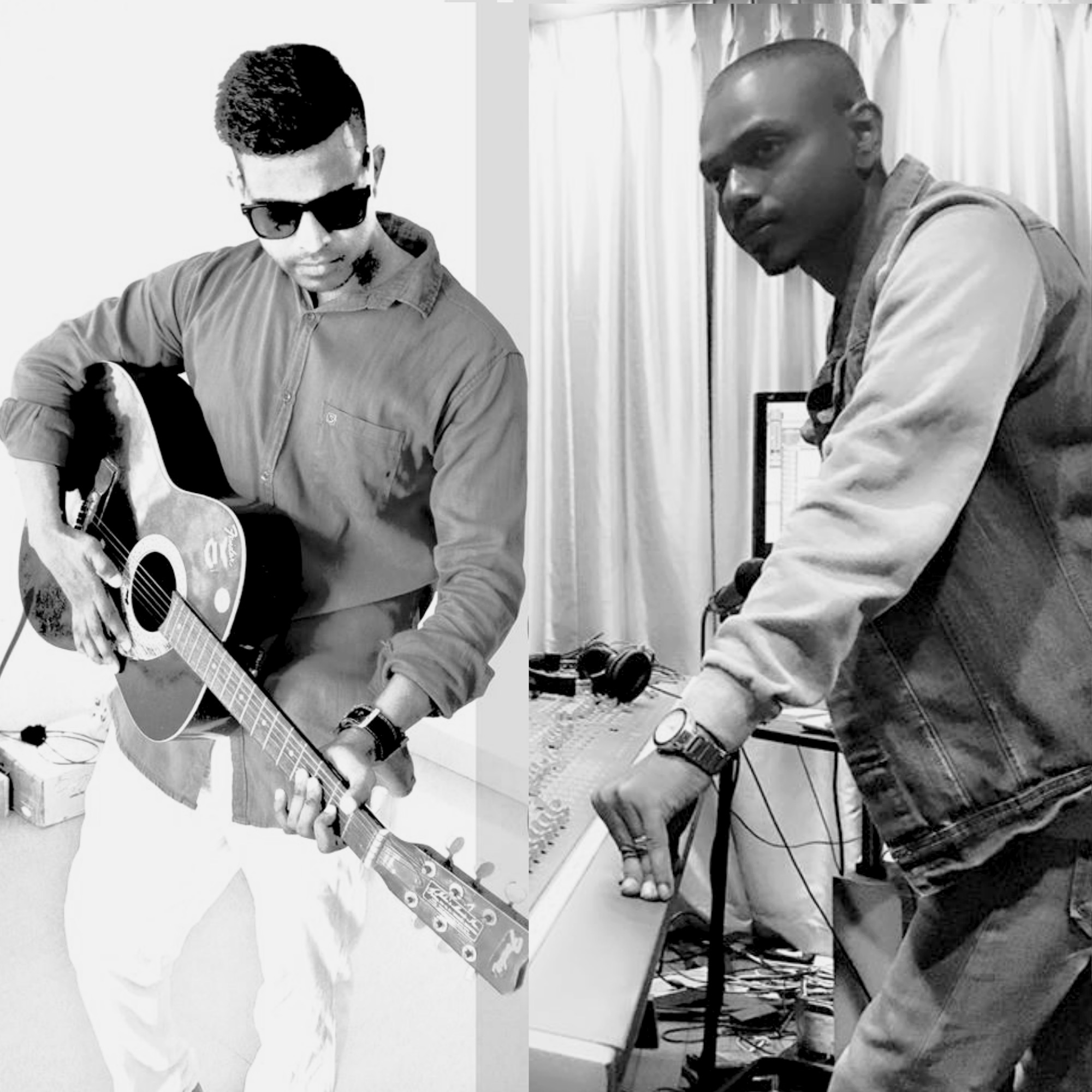
- Mamiboys Music Band Members from the Music Band Mamiboys, 2016

Background information
- Genres: Hip hop EDM music, Trap Rap
- Years active: 2007–2021
- Label: M-Boyz Recordz
- Members: Krisheno; Caleb Jacob * Kevi-J
- Website: www.mamiboys.net

Mamiboys was a boyband consisting of Caleb Jacob, Kevi-J and Krisheno from India and Singapore. Formed in 2007 by Krisheno, the band is composed of Krisheno (Music Producer, Songwriter and Rapper), Caleb Jacob (Songwriter and Lead Vocalist) and Kevi-J (Lead Vocalist). The boy band was active until Krisheno exited the boy band in 2021 to pursue his musical career as a solo artist.

Mamiboys have worked together with several South Indian Music Producers such as Harris Jayaraj, Srikanth Deva & Bobo Shashi for various Tamil and Telugu Movie Soundtracks. In 2012, the group singles titled "Chalo India" and "Siru Siru Thozvikal" were featured as official soundtracks for the Award Winning Short Film Roadside Ambanis.

== 2009-10 : Contributions to South Indian Movies ==
In the year 2009, Mamiboys made their debut in South Indian Film Music by contributing rap vocals in the song "Seema Siriki" from the South Indian Movie "Thottu Paar". Composed by Indian Music Producer, Srikanth Deva and directed by K. V. Nandhu and produced by Janaki Sivakumar and starring Vidharth, Ramana and Lakshana in leading roles the movie was released on 15 October 2010 with a U/A Certification. On the same year, Mamiboys collaborated with South-Indian Music Producer Bobo Shashi to contribute rap vocals for the song titled “Bindaas” from the Telugu Motion Picture "Bindaas" Starring film stars Manoj Manchu and Sheena Shahabadi, Bindaas was released in India on 5 February 2010 and was also later dubbed in Malayalam as "Happy 2 Happy". In 2010, the group contributed rap vocals to South Indian Music Producer Harris Jayaraj composition which was featured as a background score for the Telugu Motion Picture titled "Orange" starring film stars, Ram Charan and Genelia D Souza. The film was released in India on 26 November 2010 and was later dubbed in Malayalam as "Hai Ram Charan" and in Tamil as "Ram Charan".

== 2012 : Roadside Ambanis ==
In 2012, Mamiboys duo singles titled Chalo India and Siru Siru Thozvikal were featured as official soundtracks for the Short Film "Roadside Ambanis". Written and directed by first-timer Kamal Sethu, and produced by Grape Pictures, Roadside Ambanis was awarded as the Best Short Film at the 3rd Norway Tamil Film Festival On 27 April 2012. Oslo, Norway.

== 2013: Dum Tea ==
Dum Tea

Studio album by Mamiboys
- Genres: Hip-Hop, Rap, Pop
- Length: 28:02
- Label: M-Boyz Recordz

Dum Tea is the debut music album of Mamiboys with music scored by Jude Niranjan. Consisting of Seven Tracks, the album launch event took place at AVM Studios on May 13, 2013. Dum Tea consists of a total of seven songs.

Song	Album	Music	Instruments	Lyricist	Label
Reena I Love You	Dum Tea	Jude Niranjan	Babul- Guitar	Mamiboys	M-Boyz Recordz
Tsunami penne	Dum Tea	Jude Niranjan	Babul- Guitar	Mamiboys	M-Boyz Recordz
Natpukulle	Dum Tea	Jude Niranjan	Jude Niranjan	Prakash Baskar	M-Boyz Recordz
Dum Tea	Dum Tea	Jude Niranjan	Babul- Guitar	Mamiboys	M-Boyz Recordz
Kannadi	Dum Tea	Jude Niranjan	Babul- Guitar	Mamiboys	M-Boyz Recordz
Thurathuthey	Dum Tea	Jude Niranjan	Babul- Guitar	Mamiboys	M-Boyz Recordz
Vidiyatumey	Dum Tea	Jude Niranjan	Babul- Guitar	Mamiboys	M-Boyz Recordz

== Controversy ==
In 2015, Mamiboys accused debutant South Indian director, Thangam Saravanan of having copied their Dum Tea song concept as well as visuals from Dum Tea official music video for a song titled “Tea Podu” in his debut movie “Anjala” starring Vimal and Nandita.

However director Thangam Saravanan refused the allegation stating that 'Tea' was the only similarity between the two songs and the concept, music, lyrics, choreography and making were entirely different.

== 2016 : KAKAL ==
"KAKAL" is a song recorded by Mamiboys Caleb Jacob and was released on April 1, 2016. The music of KAKAL was produced by Mamiboys Krisheno and written by Caleb Jacob. Kakal was described as being different and fresh with the music being described as addictive.

== 2021 : Take Me Somewhere ==
"Take Me Somewhere" is a Chill EDM track produced by Mamiboys Krisheno and was released on June 1, 2021. The track was described as being different from the usual EDM genre consisting of screaming drops, grinding basslines, over the top rave synths and crowd driven anthem. Instead the song was described more of a chilled out, super ambient record with an overall summer vibe.

== Discography ==
=== South Indian Films ===
Song	Film	Composer	Singers	Lyrics	Year of release
Move Aside	Orange	Harris Jayaraj	Mamiboys	Mamiboys	2010
Bindaas	Bindaas	Bobo Sasi	Ranjith, Rap: Mamiboys	Bhuvana Chandra, Rap Lyrics: Mamiboys	2010
Seema Siriki	Thottu Paar	Srikanth Deva	Jassie Gift, Rap: Mamiboys	Rap Lyrics: Mamiboys	2010

=== Short films ===
Song	Film	Composer	Singers	Lyrics	Year of release
Chalo India	Roadside Ambanis	Jude Niranjan	Mamiboys, Justin, Chester Ben, Jude Niranjan	Mamiboys	2011
Siru Siru Thozhvigal	Roadside Ambanis	Jude Niranjan	Mamiboys Kevi-J	Mamiboys	2011

=== Singles ===
Song	Composer	Singers	Lyrics	Year of release
IMAO Entertainer	TrackGodz	Mamiboys Krisheno FT Racquel Roberts	Mamiboys Krisheno	2014
Pls Ennai Kadhali	San.V	Mamiboys Kevi-J	Mamiboys Kevi-J	2014
Empower	Mamiboys Krisheno	Mamiboys Krisheno	Mamiboys Krisheno	2015
Kakal	Mamiboys Krisheno	Mamiboys Caleb Jacob	Mamiboys Caleb Jacob	2016
Hormones Ellam	Mamiboys Krisheno	Mamiboys Caleb Jacob	Mamiboys Caleb Jacob	2017
LAP	Mamiboys Krisheno	Mamiboys Caleb Jacob	Mamiboys Caleb Jacob	2017
Unakai	Mamiboys Krisheno	Mamiboys Caleb Jacob	Mamiboys Caleb Jacob	2017
Chennaiponnu	Mamiboys Krisheno	Mamiboys Caleb Jacob	Mamiboys Krisheno, Thaman	2019
EPLP	Mamiboys Krisheno & Jerin C Raj	Thaman Rapg & Mamiboys Caleb Jacob	Mamiboys Krisheno, Thaman Rapg	2021
Take Me Somewhere	Mamiboys Krisheno	-	-	2021
