= Uu Kodathara? Ulikki Padathara? =

- Theatrical release poster
- Directed by: Sekhar Raja
- Screenplay by: Sekhar Raja
- Story by: Sekhar Raja
- Produced by: Lakshmi Manchu
- Starring: Nandamuri Balakrishna; Manoj Manchu; Deeksha Seth; Lakshmi Manchu; Sonu Sood
- Cinematography: B. Rajasekar
- Edited by: M. R. Varma
- Music by: Songs: Bobo Shashi; Vidyasagar (1 song); Score: S. Chinna
- Production company: Manchu Entertainment
- Distributed by: Manchu Entertainment (India); Cool Flicks Cinemas (overseas)
- Release date: 27 July 2012
- Running time: 134 minutes
- Country: India
- Language: Telugu
- Budget: ₹201 million

Uu... Kodathara? Ulikki Padathara? (transl. Will you be shocked? Or will you get scared?) (alternative spelling: Oo Kodathara? Ulikki Padathara?), commonly referred to as UKUP, is a 2012 Indian Telugu-language fantasy action comedy film produced by Lakshmi Manchu and directed by Sekhar Raja. The film stars Nandamuri Balakrishna, Manoj Manchu, Deeksha Seth, Lakshmi Manchu and Sonu Sood, with music composed by Vidyasagar and Bobo Shashi, along with the background score composed by S. Chinna. Cinematography is handled by B. Rajasekar. The soundtrack of the film was launched on 30 May 2012. The film was released worldwide on 27 July 2012.

== Plot ==
The film begins in a heritage palace, Gandharva Mahal, which has belonged to the royal dynasty Rudramaneni for centuries. As of today, Rayudu is its heir who has lost his splendor and resides in the outhouse with his wife and two daughters, Visalakshi and Jagadamba. He allows the palace in different portions for people of various mindsets on rent to make ends meet. In which some willies misuse the generosity of Rayudu and power over him. At that point, Manoj, an energetic man, lands on the premises and joins as a tenant, where he spots old insane beggar Amurtha Valli wandering in the surroundings. He terror-stricken the sly with a fake horror play and aligns them. Rayudu fixes a prosperous alliance for Visalakshi and bestows the palace as a dowry. He requests the tenants to vacate, which they deny, but Manoj tactically restores it. Parallelly, he always squabbles with Jagadhamba, and in time, they crush. Suddenly, one night, aghast Manoj grounds Rayudu with a bloodied nose and claims that a supernatural power batter and warns him never to leave the palace. Rayudu states it may be his father, Rudramaneni Narasimha Rayudu, and spins rearward.

A long time ago, Rudramaneni Narasimha Rayudu was an arbiter whom the terrain adores as a deity, and it is eternal from four sides in his reign. He loves the Gandharva Mahal and dotes on his sibling Jagadhamba. Based on his father's promise, Narsimha Rayudu knits Jagadhamba with malice, Phanindra Bhupati being unbeknownst. Soon after, Bhupati ruses by discomfiting himself as down and out. Annoyed, Narsimha Rayudu gives half of what he owns, including the Gandharva Mahal, to his sister and leaves the house. He also gifts a one-fourth to his true blue Seshayya. Bhupati lusts on his sweetheart Amrutha, whom he aspires to be his spouse. However, she refuses it as Bhupati is already in wedlock. The vicious Bhupati then slays Jagadhamba and makes it a suicide. He attempts to splice Amurtha only a week later in the Gandharva Mahal. Recognizing it, Narasimha Rayudu flares up on Bhupati when Seshayya dies in combat, and Bhupati backstabs Narasimha Rayudu, and he, too, slaughters him. Before leaving his breath, Narasimha Rayudu warns that Gandharva Mahal belongs to him and nobody can dare to touch it. Devastated, Amrutha blames herself for the deed and transforms into a beggar.

Visalakshi's wedding arrangements are in progress at the palace and are under Manoj's charge. Rushi, the bridegroom, arrives with his family. Bujji, his maternal uncle, is a duplicitous ploy to squat the palace to convert it into a hotel and nab the documents. The following night, Narasimha Rayudu's soul thumps & spooks him. Rushi's mother decides to cancel the nuptials when Manoj coaxes them and retrieves the documents. Despite this, Bujji calls a wizard who senses the existence of Narasimha Rayudu and Bhupati therein. According to Narasimha Rayudu's guidance, the wizard captures the violent soul of Bhupati. In the interim, Rayudu learns about Manoj's love affair with Jagadhamba when he invites his parents. Surprisingly, Manoj is the grandson of Seshayya, and he was sent by his mother, Suguna, to aid Rayudu.

Manoj reveals to Jagadhamba that the wallop of Narasimha Rayudu's soul on him and Bujji is part of his play to safeguard the palace. At once, he is under dichotomy for words and doings of the wizard. Overhearing it, enraged Bujji knocks out Manoj, and assuming the wizard is also an impostor, he breaks the bottle containing Bhupati's soul. The unfettered spirit of Bhupati enters Rishi's body and creates mayhem. To impede him, Narasimha Rayudu catches hold of Manoj's body when a deadly battle erupts. Immediately, the wizard rushes to Amurtha to solve the problem and avoid the imminent. Amurtha sacrifices her life to relieve Bhupati's soul. Manoj and Jagadhamba and Rushi and Visalakshi's marriages occur. Finally, the movie ends with Manoj viewing Narasimha Rayudu sitting on a chair and smoking a cigar, indicating that he will forever protect the Gandharva Mahal.

== Cast ==
- Nandamuri Balakrishna as Rudramaneni Narasimha Rayudu
- Manoj Manchu as Manoj
- Deeksha Seth as Jagadamba
- Lakshmi Manchu as Amrutha Valli
- Sonu Sood as Phanindra Bhoopati
- Prabhu as Rayudu, Narasimha Rayadu's son
- Rishi as Rishi Kumar
- Sai Kumar as Bujji
- Dharmavarapu Subramanyam as Utsava Murthy
- Pruthvi Raj as Siddha
- Ajay as Mantrik
- Raghu Babu as Derala Satti Babu
- Srinivasa Reddy as Sreenu
- Raja Ravindra as Doctor
- Prabhas Sreenu as Cable Keshav
- Praveen as Lavudu
- Nizhalgal Ravi as Manoj's father
- Gollapudi Maruti Rao as Venkat Rao
- Chalapathi Rao as Raja Rao
- Panchi Bora as Visalakshi (Narasimha Rayudu's wife)
- Simer Motiani as Jagadamba (Narasimha Rayudu's sister)
- Suhasini as Suguna
- Aishwarya as Rajyalakshmi
- Abhinayashree as Dolla Savitri
- Madhumitha as Vishalakshi
- Meena Kumari as Jagadha's mother
- Prabha as Rishi Kumar's mother
- Ragini as Utsava Murthy's wife

== Soundtrack ==
Uu Kodathara? Ulikki Padathara?

Soundtrack album by: Bobo Shashi; Vidyasagar
- Released: 30 May 2012
- Recorded: 2012
- Genre: Feature film soundtrack
- Length: 25:15
- Language: Telugu
- Label: Aditya Music
- Producer: Bobo Shashi

Bobo Shashi chronology
| Thakita Thakita (2010) | Uu Kodathara? Ulikki Padathara? (2012) | Attu (2017) |

Vidyasagar chronology
| Diamond Necklace (2012) | Uu Kodathara? Ulikki Padathara? (2012) | Thappana (2012) |

The soundtrack of the film was composed by Bobo Shashi, which happens to be his second Manoj Manchu project after Bindaas. One of the songs on the album was composed by Vidyasagar. Initially, the audio launch event was planned to be held on 18 May 2012 in Guntur. But it was postponed for unknown reasons. The soundtrack album was released on 30 May 2012 under Aditya Music label at Shilpakala Vedika in Hyderabad. All songs in the album were penned by R. Ramu and the background score of the film was given by Chinna.

| No. | Title | Music | Singer(s) | Length |
|---|---|---|---|---|
| 1. | "Anuragame Haaratulaye" | Vidyasagar | Karthik, Anwesha Datta Gupta | 4:42 |
| 2. | "Prathi Kshanam Narakame" | Bobo Shashi | Ramee, Tupakeys, G-Arulaz | 4:52 |
| 3. | "Adhi Ani Idhi Ani" | Bobo Shashi | Haricharan, Prashanthini | 4:13 |
| 4. | "Are you ready" | Bobo Shashi | Instrumental | 2:02 |
| 5. | "Abbabba Abbabba" | Bobo Shashi | Ramee, Nrithya, Janani, Reeta, Ramya NSK | 4:38 |
| 6. | "Hai Re Hai" | Bobo Shashi | Ranjith, M. L. R. Karthikeyan, Senthil, Sam, Surmukhi Raman, Ramya, Deepa | 4:48 |
| Total length: | | | | 25:15 |

== Production ==
Manoj Manchu was quoted many times stating that UKUP was his dream project. The movie will be shot simultaneously in Telugu and Tamil. Director Shekar Raja worked as an assistant to director Krishna Vamsi. Although planned three years ago, the movie entered pre-production in early 2011. Lakshmi Manchu, along with Manoj, established Manchu Entertainments banner to produce this movie.

Balakrishna Nandamuri was approached for an important role in the movie, which he agreed to do. Dialogues in the movie are penned by Lakshmi Bhupal (of Ala Modalaindi fame) and cinematography will be handled by B. Rajashekar. Rajashekar is also working with Manoj on his other movie Mr. Nokia. On 6 June 2011 the film was officially announced. The regular filming began on 2 August 2011 with Veronica Manchu switching on the camera while Manchu Lakshmi's husband Anand gave the clap for the first shot and Mohan Babu directed the first shot. The entire shoot of the film would be wrapped up in a single schedule. Initial schedule of it was completed in Manikonda by 16 August 2011. It was announced that Balakrishna would be playing the role of Zamindar Narsimha Rayudu, and he joined the filming in Antarvedi along with Sonu Sood and Bhanu Chander. Lakshmi Manchu has announced that a huge Gandharva Mahal set was built with a budget more than ₹6.5 crores and more than 50% of the shoot would be done in it. Tamil version of the movie was officially launched on 15 December 2011 in Chennai. By end of February 2012, almost 80% of the total filming was completed and filming of the climax will begin at Hyderabad in March 2012. An event took place on 12 May 2012 at the Gandarva Mahal set, where Dasari Narayana Rao, K. Raghavendra Rao and Vara Prasad launched the logo and released the posters of the film. Uu Kodathara? Ulikki Padatara? was released on 27 July 2012 in more than 60 theatres in Hyderabad alone.

The logo and posters of Varuvan Thalaivan, the predominantly dubbed Tamil version of the film, was launched in Chennai by Tamil actor Silambarasan on 21 May 2012. The team re-shot certain scenes with actors Pandiarajan, Charle and Manobala for the Tamil audiences. However the Telugu version's poor performance at the box office meant that the Tamil version was not released.

== Release ==
=== Critical reception ===
The film opened to mixed to negative reviews but Balakakrishna's performance was praised by critics. Jeevi from Idlebrain gave a 3.25 out of 5.0 rating and said "UKUP is a special film for two reasons. One is that it introduces a big star like Bala Krishna in a vital role. If big stars accept story-oriented films and act as per the demand of the role instead of looking for equal screen space, it’s good for the industry. The second reason is that the producer has passionately invested in the project though it’s a story-oriented film with some experimentation. Watch it for the performances of Bala Krishna Nandamuri, Manoj Manchu, and Lakshmi Manchu. And for the spectacular Gandharva Mahal set". Mahesh Koneru from 123Telugu gave a 3.0 out of 5.0 rating and said "Balakrishna’s majestic performance is the biggest attraction for UKUP. Though the film has been made with rich production values and has a superb last 25 minutes, a below par first half and unconventionally shot songs work against the film." Karthik Pasupulate from The Times of India gave 2.5 stars and said "Vu Kodathara Vulikki Padathara is one of those films that tries hard to push the envelope, but succeeds only in parts. It does offer some moments though, better execution could have raised the movie experience by a fair few notches. "
