= Satish Kaushik filmography =

List of films and Television series of Satish Kaushik

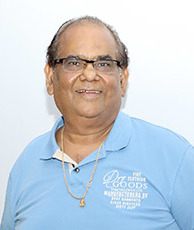
Satish Kaushik on the sets of the film Mr. Kabaadi in 2017

The following is a complete list of the filmography of Indian actor Satish Kaushik.

== Films ==
=== Acting credits ===
Year	Title	Role	Notes
1981	Chakra	Boot Polish Guy	
1983	Jaane Bhi Do Yaaro	Ashok	
1983	Woh 7 Din	Kishan	
1983	Masoom	Tiwari	also assistant director
1983	Mandi	Councillor	
1984	Ab Ayega Mazaa	Khajju	
1984	Utsav	Cart Driver	
1985	Saagar	Batuklal	
1985	Mohabbat	Monto	
1987	Mr. India	Calendar	also assistant director
1987	Kaash	Jagan	
1987	Uttar Dakshin	Kashiram	
1987	Thikana	Chakradhari	
1987	Jalwa	Inspector Ramu Ghadiali	
1987	Susman		
1988	Ek Naya Rishta		
1989	Ram Lakhan	Kashiram	
1989	Vardi		
1989	Joshilaay	Bachchu Lal	also assistant director
1989	Prem Pratigyaa	Charan	
1989	Aag Se Khelenge	Inspector Pardesi	
1990	Awaargi	Azaad's Friend	
1990	Taqdeer Ka Tamasha	Constable Sharma	
1990	Swarg	Airport	
1990	Jamai Raja	Banke Bihari Chaturvedi "BBC"	
1991	Vishkanya	Lala Lachiram Chaudhary	
1991	Maut Ki Sazaa	Advocate Girdhari	
1991	Mehandi Ban Gai Khoon		
1993	Sardar		
1994	Andaz	Panipuri Sharma	
1996	Saajan Chale Sasural	Mutthu Swamy	
1997	Mr. and Mrs. Khiladi	Chanda Mama	
1997	Deewana Mastana	Pappu Pager	
1997	Mere Sapno Ki Rani	Ram Nehle	
1997	Ghoonghat	Lalu Lal Langotia	
1997	Dil Ke Jharoke Main	Mac / Mohan Pahariya	
1997	Gudgudee	Ravindranath	
1997	Chhota Chetan	Professor Chashmish	
1998	Pardesi Babu	Harpal "Happy" Singh	
1998	Bade Miyan Chote Miyan	Sharafat Ali	
1998	Gharwali Baharwali	Jumbo	
1998	Aunty No. 1	Mr. Pareshan	
1998	Qila	Ghanya Seth	
1999	Haseena Maan Jaayegi	Kunjbihari Lal	
1999	Rajaji	Shaadilal	
1999	Aa Ab Laut Chalen	Chaurasia	
1999	Bade Dilwala	Police Inspector Iqbal Shaikh	
1999	Hum Aapke Dil Mein Rehte Hain	German	
2000	Hadh Kar Di Aapne	Prakash Choudhury	
2000	Papa The Great	Chutki Prasad	
2000	Dulhan Hum Le Jayenge	Laughing Inspector	
2001	Kyo Kii... Main Jhuth Nahin Bolta	Mohan	
2002	Hum Kisise Kum Nahin	Pappu Pager	
2003	Out of Control	Mango Singh	
2003	Tehzeeb	Kamal Choksi	
2003	Calcutta Mail	Sujan Singh	
2004	Wajahh: A Reason to Kill	Inspector Bholenath	
2004	Aabra Ka Daabra	Dilbaug Singh / Jadugar Pyaara Singh	
2005	Khullam Khulla Pyaar Karen	Sindhi	
2006	Shoonya Rasiklal Chaddha		
2006	Umar	Rajpal Singh	
2007	Kuch Khatta Kuch Meetha		
2007	Brick Lane	Chanu Ahmed	
2008	God Tussi Great Ho	Netaji	Cameo
2008	Dhoom Dadakka	Johnny English	
2008	Migration		short
2009	Love Kaa Taddka		
2009	Do Knot Disturb	Govardhan's Boss	
2009	Road, Movie	Om	
2009	Teree Sang	Narender Punjabi	
2010	Milenge Milenge	Rosan Saputra	
2010	City of Gold	Mama	
2010	Do Dilon Ke Khel Mein		
2010	Atithi Tum Kab Jaoge?	Ranjeet Taneja	
2011	Rascals	Father Pascal	
2011	Hum Tum Shabana	Chacha Panju	
2011	Mummy Punjabi: Superman Ki Bhi Maa!!		
2011	Chatur Singh Two Star	Gullu Gulfam	
2011	Aagaah: The Warning	Ramsharan's father	
2011	Double Dhamaal	Baba Batanand Swami	
2011	404	Professor Vaidya	
2011	Desi Boyz	Mr. Dhillon	
2012	Gali Gali Chor Hai	Bharat's father	
2012	Qasam Se Qasam Se	Cafeteria owner	
2014	Dekh Tamasha Dekh	Muthaseth	
2014	Lakshmi	Reddy	
2015	Wedding Pullav	Adi's father	
2016	Dishoom	Aarif Raza Qureshi	Voiceover
2016	Udta Punjab	Tayaji	
2017	Commando 2: The Black Money Trail	Dhariwal Ranwal	
2018	Namaste England	Gurnaam Singh Shergill	
2018	Yamla Pagla Deewana: Phir Se	Lawyer Bedi	
2018	Fanney Khan	Kader Bhai	
2018	Soorma	Gurcharan Singh	
2019	Judgementall Hai Kya	Officer Durjan Deshmukh	
2019	Bharat	Naval Officer Jayram Shirodkar	
2019	Chhoriyan Chhoron Se Kam Nahi Hoti	Jaidev Choudhary	Haryanvi language film
2020	Chhalaang	Kamlesh Singh Hooda	
2020	Khaali Peeli	Inspector Bhim Singh	
2020	Baaghi 3	Bhoklelal Mupe Chatora	
2021	Kaagaz	Advocate Sadhuram	
2022	Sharmaji Namkeen	Chaddha	
2022	Thar	Bhure	
2023	Chhatriwali	Ratan Lamba	
2023	Kisi Ka Bhai Kisi Ki Jaan	Nadeem Chacha	posthumous release
2023	The Comedian	Hasmukh Lal	short, posthumous release
2024	Mirg	Ravi	posthumous release
2024	Kaagaz 2	Shushil Rastogi	posthumous release
2024	Patna Shuklla	Judge Arun Kumar Jha	posthumous release
2025	Emergency	Jagjivan Ram	posthumous release

=== Other credits ===
Year	Film	Director	Producer	Screenwriter	Notes
1982	Aadharshila	No	No	No	assistant director
1993	Roop Ki Rani Choron Ka Raja	Yes	No	No	
1995	Prem	Yes	No	No	
1999	Hum Aapke Dil Mein Rehte Hain	Yes	No	Yes	Nominated - Screen Award for Best Director
2000	Hamara Dil Aapke Paas Hai	Yes	No	No	
2001	Mujhe Kucch Kehna Hai	Yes	No	No	
2002	Badhaai Ho Badhaai	Yes	No	No	
2003	Tere Naam	Yes	No	No	Nominated - Filmfare Award for Best Director Nominated - IIFA Award for Best Director
2005	Vaada	Yes	No	No	
2006	Shaadi Se Pehle	Yes	No	No	
2008	Karzzz	Yes	No	No	
2009	Teree Sang	Yes	No	No	
2010	Milenge Milenge	Yes	No	No	
2014	Gang of Ghosts	Yes	Yes	No	
2021	Kaagaz	Yes	Yes	No	
2024	Kaagaz 2	No	Yes	No	posthumous release

== Television ==
Year	Title	Role	Notes
1986	Katha Sagar	Tulsiyani	
1989	Udaan	Police officer	
1989	Udaan	Pedestrian	
1997–1998	Top 10	Noni Singh	also writer
2000	Hotel Hindustan	Ranjeet	
2004	India's Best Cinestars Ki Khoj	Judge	
2004–2005	Malini Iyer	—N/a	creator and director
2008–2009	Jalwa Four 2 Ka 1	Judge	
2015	The Great Indian Family Drama	Nawaab Jung Bahadur	
2015–2016	Sumit Sambhal Lega	Jasbir Walia	
2017	May I Come In Madam?	Bobby Chacha	
2020	The Chargesheet: Innocent or Guilty?	Laxman Chotrani	
2020	Scam 1992	Manu Mundra	
2022	Bloody Brothers	Handa	
2022	Guilty Minds	Tejinder Bhalla	
2023	Pop Kaun?	Kartar Singh	posthumous release
2023	Guns & Gulaabs	Ganchi	posthumous release
