= Jarugandi =

- Directed by: A. N. Pitchumani
- Written by: A. N. Pitchumani
- Story by: A. N. Pitchumani
- Produced by: Badri Kasthuri; Nithin Sathya
- Starring: Jai; Reba Monica John
- Narrated by: A. N. Pitchumani
- Cinematography: R. D. Rajasekhar
- Edited by: Praveen K. L.
- Music by: Bobo Shashi
- Production companies: Shraddha Entertainment; Shvedh Group
- Release date: 26 October 2018
- Country: India
- Language: Tamil

Jarugandi (transl. Move forward) is a 2018 Indian Tamil-language action film written and directed by A. N. Pitchumani and co-produced by Nithin Sathya and Badri Kasthuri. The film features Jai and Reba Monica John, while Amit Tiwari, Daniel Annie Pope, Robo Shankar, Ilavarasu, and Bose Venkat play supporting roles. The music was composed by Bobo Shashi with editing by Praveen K. L. and cinematography by R. D. Rajasekhar. The production of this film started in late 2017. The film was released on 26 October 2018 to negative reviews and was a flop at the box office.

== Plot ==
Annoyed with the struggles of living as a lower-middle-class person, Sathya (Jai) decides to go to any extent to make money for his family. With his friend Paari (Daniel Annie Pope), he meets Samuel (Ilavarasu), who promises him money if he can forge documents. Sathya and Paari start a travel company and dream of a happy life. However, police officer Appadurai (Bose Venkat), aware of the forged documents, threatens to jail them unless they arrange ₹10 lakh in two days. Sathya sends his family away and, along with Paari, starts looking for the money to bribe Appadurai. Gajendran (Robo Shankar), a rich man in love with Keerthy (Reba Monica John), offers them money if they help him win over his love interest. However, circumstances force Sathya to kidnap Keerthy, which earns him the wrath of a human trafficking group led by a gangster (Amit Tiwari).

== Cast ==
- Jai as Sathya
- Reba Monica John as Keerthy
- Amit Tiwari as Human Trafficker
- Daniel Annie Pope as Paari
- Robo Shankar as Gajendran
- Ilavarasu as Samuel
- Bose Venkat as Appadurai
- Jayakumar as Guna
- G. M. Kumar as Warden Rajaram
- Nandha Saravanan
- Kutty Gopi
- Kaavya Sha
- Manoj Lulla
- Osthe J. Ram as a henchman
- Nithin Sathya as Ramesh (cameo appearance)

== Production ==
Nithin Sathya announced the production number one titled Jarugandi, a Tamil feature family from Shvedh. He teamed up with Badri Kasthuri from Shraddha Entertainment in the production of the film. The film is written and directed by A. N. Pitchumani, a former assistant to director Venkat Prabhu. Bobo Shashi, R. D. Rajasekhar, Praveen K. L. and Remiyan were selected as the composer, cinematographer, film editor and art director respectively.

Jai plays the lead role in this movie. Nithin's association with Jai dates back to the film Chennai 600028 (2007) and Chennai 600028 2 (2016), where they appeared together on screen. This "comfortable equation" between them was the reason behind his interest to cast Jai for the film. The film also marked the Tamil debut of Malayalam actress Reba Monica John, who played the female lead of the movie. Amit Tiwari is the antagonist. The film also features Robo Shankar, Daniel Annie Pope, and Ilavarasu. The motion poster of the movie was released in November 2017. It reveals a heist plot and exciting car chases, which piqued the expectations for the movie.

Following the announcement of the film's title in November 2017, 50% of the film was completed within a 20-day shooting schedule, thereby bringing justice to the title "Jarugandi" which translates to "Move on". As the dates of the shoot were changed, the original cinematographer Arvi (the cinematographer of Pandigai) had to leave the project soon after the first schedule. Subsequently, ace cinematographer R. D. Rajasekhar was taken onboard to continue the camera work. The second schedule shoot was expected to start in December 2017, with promises of the rest of the film to be completed by the end of it.

In January 2017, following the allegations of non-cooperation by the producer of the film Balloon, Badri Kasthuri publicly backed Jai and his commitment to this work on Jarugandi

== Soundtrack ==
The soundtrack was composed by Bobo Shashi, while the film's audio rights were secured by U1 Records. Jai made his playback singing debut with this film.

Jarugandi

Soundtrack album by Bobo Shashi
- Released: 2018
- Venue: Chennai
- Genre: Feature film soundtrack
- Length: 19:52
- Language: Tamil
- Label: U1 Records
- Producer: Bobo Shashi

Bobo Shashi chronology
Attu (2017)	Jarugandi (2018)	Hostel (2022)

Track listing
No.	Title	Lyrics	Singer(s)	Length
1.	"Yaaradi Nee"	Uma Devi	Yuvan Shankar Raja	3:48
2.	"Seyiradha Senju Mudi"	Gangai Amaren	Jai	3:30
3.	"Ooh Kanave"	A. N. Pitchumani	Jesse Samuel	2:28
4.	"Aadupuli Aattam"	K. Chandru, A. N. Pitchumani	Deva	3:18
5.	"Yaaradi Nee (Karaoke)"	Uma Devi	Bobo Shashi	3:48
Total length:				19:52

== Reception ==
Thinkal Menon of The Times of India gave 2.5/5 stars and wrote, "A better screenplay, with gripping characters and thrilling moments, would have made the movie more interesting." Janani K of India Today gave 2/5 stars and wrote, "If Pichumani had concentrated more on incorporating some interesting sequences, Jarugandi could have been more engaging." Gopinath Rajendran of Cinema Express gave 1.5/5 stars and wrote, 'On the whole, Jarugandi is a mediocre film which can't be saved by the rare smile-worthy scene it gives us here and there." Anjana Shekar of The News Minute wrote, "Jarugandi is a film you can actually skip."
