= Neeyum Naanum =

2010 film directed by S. V. Solairaja

- Directed by: S. V. Solairaja
- Written by: S. V. Solairaja
- Produced by: S. V. Solairaja
- Starring: Sanjeev; Chetna Pande
- Cinematography: Prem Shankar
- Edited by: S. Ashok Mehta
- Music by: Sriram Vijay
- Production company: Team Visions
- Release date: 27 August 2010
- Running time: 135 minutes
- Country: India
- Language: Tamil

Neeyum Naanum (transl. You And Me) is a 2010 Tamil language musical dance film written, produced and directed by S. V. Solairaja. The film stars Sanjeev and newcomer Chetna Pande, with Sampath Raj, Vadhan, Rinson Simon, Master Sachin, Anju, Manobala, Singamuthu and Halwa Vasu playing supporting roles. The film's musical score was written by Sriram Vijay and was released on 27 August 2010.

== Plot ==
The film opens with Surya, an aerobics instructor, joining a school owned by Sampath, a powerful and influential chairman of multiple institutions. Surya befriends Sampath's niece Diya and helps a financially struggling student, Karthik, gain admission to the school. However, when Karthik's mother falls ill and needs surgery, he decides to enter an inter-collegiate dance competition to win prize money. During a practice session, Surya is impressed by Karthik's dancing skills and wants him to lead their school's team, but Sampath's spoilt son, Siddharth, opposes the decision and creates a rift in the class.

When Karthik's mother's condition worsens, he is unable to attend a pre-selection session and his team is disqualified. Meanwhile, Surya and Diya fall in love, but Diya is engaged to Sampath's brother Arun. Frustrated with the school's politics, both Surya and Karthik leave to form their own dance team with underprivileged slum children.

As Surya and Diya's love grows, Sampath convinces Arun to call off their engagement. In the end, the two teams compete against each other in the inter-collegiate dance competition, and the slum kids' team emerges victorious, bringing Karthik's mother the money she needs for her surgery.

== Cast ==
- Sanjeev as Surya
- Chetna Pande as Diya
- Sampath Raj as Sampath
- Vadhan as Arun
- Rinson Simon as Karthik
- Master Sachin as Siddharth
- Anju as Sunitha, Sampath's wife
- Manobala
- Singamuthu as Singamuthu
- Halwa Vasu as Vasu
- Muthukaalai as Bus conductor
- Krishnamoorthy as Bus driver
- Nellai Siva as Nellai
- Kumaresan as Ganesan
- Theni Murugan as Auto rickshaw driver
- Senthi Kumari as Karthik's mother
- Shobana
- George Maryan
- Pasi Sathya as Rakkamma
- Ammu Ramachandran as Host

== Production ==
Director S. V. Solairaja, who had directed more than 7000 TV serial episodes in many languages, made his directorial debut with Neeyum Naanum under the banner of Team Visions. Sanjeev who acted in Kulir 100° (2009) was selected to play the hero while Chetna Pande, national level badminton player, was chosen to play the heroine. Music baton was wielded by Sriram Vijay, S. Ashok Mehta took care of the editing and the cinematography was by Prem Shankar. The film was shot in 35 mm film camera and the audio was released in 3D.

== Soundtrack ==
Neeyum Naanum

Soundtrack album by Sriram Vijay
- Released: 19 May 2010
- Recorded: 2010
- Genre: Feature film soundtrack
- Length: 21:40
- Producer: Sriram Vijay

The soundtrack was composed by Sriram Vijay. It features 7 tracks written by Piraisoodan, Palani Bharathi, Sriram Vijay and Wattabottles. The audio was launched on 19 May 2010 by actress Khushbu at South Indian Film Chamber of Commerce in Chennai. V. C. Guhanathan, Pandiarajan, R. K. Selvamani and T. G. Thyagarajan attended the audio launch.

Track	Song	Singer(s)	Duration
1	"Hai Figure Onnu"	Karthik	4:19
2	"Azhagana Enn Azhagana"	Chinmayi	4:45
3	"Hailasa Hailasa"	Krishnamoorthy	3:00
4	"Thoduvadu Thodu"	Fernandes	4:40
5	"Dance Themes"	–	3:07
6	"Madai Thirapadu Isaiya"	Ranjith	7:09
7	"Neeyum Naanum"	Karthik	0:41

== Release ==
The film was released on 27 August 2010 alongside five other films.

=== Critical reception ===
Behindwoods.com rated the film 1.5 out of 5 and said, "We have yet another movie which is predictable and makes you yawn. More so because this one involves school going kids. The direction and screenplay have a lot of loopholes. The one thing which makes an exception in the movie is the choreography of a couple of dance sequences". S. R. Ashok Kumar from The Hindu wrote, "Director Solairaja has worked a lot on television, and still has a long way to go in films. But, his effort in portraying school children, and their life, with its share of egos and friendships, is commendable.". A reviewer from The New Indian Express stated, "The better moments in the film are the scenes where Surya selects his team and prepares them. The dance scenes were also ably executed. Otherwise, there is nothing novel about the script or its treatment". Another reviewer rated the film 2.75 out of 5 and said, "Since it deals with the dance competition of the kids, the energy levels are good but then the consistency was not maintained throughout the film [..] The film would have scored well if there was some depth in the scenes and few twists added to it".

=== Box office ===
The film took an average opening at the Chennai box office.
