= Mirg =

Mirg (Persian: ميرگ) may refer to:

- Mereg
- Mirgah-e Derizh

== See also ==
- Mirg, a 2024 Indian film by Tarun Sharma
