= Sanjeev Karthick =

Indian actor

- Born: Syed Azharuddin Bukhari; Coimbatore, Tamil Nadu, India
- Occupation: Actor
- Years active: 2007–present
- Spouse: Alya Manasa (m. 2019)
- Children: 2 ( Aila Syed, Syed Arsh )

YouTube information
- Channel: SANJIEV&ALYA
- Years active: 2021– Present
- Subscribers: 2.47 million
- Views: 1.14 billion
- Last updated: 5 August 2026

Syed, better known by his stage name Sanjeev Karthick is an Indian actor and dance choreographer who appears in Tamil language films and television serials. He made his full-length feature film debut in the 2009 film, Kulir 100°.

== Career ==
Prior to acting in films, he was enrolled at Sri Ramakrishna Engineering College in Coimbatore, India having graduated from Jaycee Higher Secondary School. He made his debut in the 2009 film, Kulir 100° opposite Riya Bamniyal, though the film became a commercial and critical failure. Sanjeev portrayed Surya, the son of a rowdy sent to a private boarding school. He since appeared in a string of low-budget films including Neeyum Naanum (2010) and Sagakkal (2011).

In his latest release, Nanbargal Kavanathirku, produced by Green Channel Entertainment, he played the lead role opposite Manisha Jith, who had previously played Sarath Kumar's daughter in Gambeeram. After being unable to garner success as a lead actor in films, he gained fame as television actor in his debut TV series Raja Rani which aired on Vijay TV.

== Personal life ==
Born to Indian parents, Sanjeev was brought up in Chennai. In 2019, Sanjeev married Alya Manasa, his co-star in Raja Rani, and have children Aila Syed and Arsh Syed.

== Filmography ==
=== Films ===
- Note: all films are in Tamil, unless otherwise noted.

Year	Film	Role	Notes
2007	Vel	Raja Pandi's relative	
2008	Apoorva	Satya	Malayalam film
2009	Kulir 100°	Surya	
2010	Neeyum Naanum	Surya	
2011	Sagakkal	Mahi	
2013	Kurumbukara Pasanga	Sasi	
2013	Nanbargal Kavanathirku	Kathir	
2014	Uyirukku Uyiraga	Surya	
2017	Aangila Padam	Chella	
2018	6 Athiyayam	Karthi	
2020	Mane Number 13	Aswanth	Kannada film
2020	13aam Number Veedu	Aswanth	

=== Television ===
Year	Title	Role	Channel
2017–2019	Raja Rani	Karthick	Star Vijay
2019–2021	Kaatrin Mozhi	Santhosh	Star Vijay
2021–2025	Vanakkam Tamizha	Guest	Sun TV
2021–2026	Kayal	Ezhilarasan	Sun TV
2022	Ullathai Allitha	Ezhilarasan	Sun TV
2022	Maathi Yosi	Contestant	Sun TV
2022	Vanakkam Tamizha	Guest	Sun TV
2023	Iniyavale Iniya	Himself	Sun TV
2023	Super Samayal	Contestant	Sun TV
2023	Priyamaana Thozhi	Ezhilarasan	Sun TV
