= Karthik Sabesh =

Indian actor (1988/1989–2026)

- Born: 1988 or 1989; Madras, Tamil Nadu, India
- Died: 19 October 2026 (aged 37); Chennai, Tamil Nadu, India
- Occupation: Actor
- Years active: 2003–2015
- Spouse: Ramya Karthik
- Children: 2
- Family: Sabesh (father); Archana Sabesh (sister)

Karthik Sabesh (1988 or 1989 – 19 October 2026) was an Indian actor who worked predominantly in Tamil language films. He was the son of Sabesh, a part of the musical duo Sabesh–Murali.

== Career ==
Karthik Sabesh grew up in a family long associated with the Tamil film industry. His father Sabesh was a part of the music composer duo Sabesh-Murali, along with his uncle Murali. Another uncle Deva was the most successful of the trio of brothers and worked on big budget projects in the 1990s. His two cousins Srikanth Deva and Bobo Shashi are also music composers, while another cousin Jai is an actor in Tamil films.

Karthik first appeared as a college student in Silambarasan's Vallavan, featuring in a gang also including Santhanam and Sandhya. He next played a pivotal role in Anita Udeep's Kulir 100° (2009), and was selected after his cousin Bobo Shashi, the film's music composer, recommended him for the film. He won acclaim for his role in Kaadhal Solla Vandhen (2010), with a critic from Rediff.com noting "with his antics and one-liners, [he] sets the aisles rolling in laughter". Karthik predominantly appeared as a supporting comedian in films such as Burma (2014) but played one of the multiple leads in Mahabalipuram (2015). Baradwaj Rangan called his performance "excellent" in the former film.

== Personal life ==
Karthik was married to Ramya, with whom he had two children. He died on 19 October 2026, at the age of 37.

== Filmography ==
Year	Film	Role	Notes
2003	Dum	'Ninety' Karthik	
2004	Dreams		
2006	Vallavan	Vallavan's classmate	
2009	Kulir 100°	Babloo	
2010	Kaadhal Solla Vandhen	Petha Perumal	
2010	Thakita Thakita	Scud	Telugu film
2013	Udhayam NH4	Karthik	
2013	Pattathu Yaanai	Pongal Kumar	
2014	Oru Kanniyum Moonu Kalavaanikalum	Isaac	
2014	Burma	Boomer	
2015	Mahabalipuram	Saamy	
