= Kurumbukara Pasanga =

2013 Indian film by T. R. Samidurai

- Official poster
- Directed by: T. R.Samidurai
- Written by: T. R. Samidurai
- Produced by: Ravirajan
- Starring: Sanjeev; Monika
- Cinematography: K. Pandian
- Edited by: Mahavishnu
- Music by: Arul Raj
- Release date: 4 January 2013
- Country: India
- Language: Tamil

Kurumbukara Pasanga (transl. Mischievous kids) is a 2013 Indian Tamil-language romantic drama film directed by T. R. Samidurai starring Sanjeev and Monika.

== Cast ==
- Sanjeev as Sasi
- Monika as Sindhu
- Pandiarajan as Sasi's father
- Manobala as Cop
- K. Ravirajan
- Thennale as Cop
- Chelladurai
- Nellai Siva

== Soundtrack ==
The music is composed by Arul Raj. Lyrics by Snehan and Kavinpa.

- "Enthan Thalaiyil" - Harish Raghavendra, Madhumitha
- "Deepavali" - Anand
- "Pathika Vacha" - Krishna Iyer
- "Kuruchi Kallakuruchi’" - Vijayan
- "Nanthan Nee Kaetta Mapillai" - Krishna Iyer, Anuradha Sriram

== Reception ==
A critic from The Times of India gave the film a rating of one out of five stars and opined that "There is little that happens in ‘Kurumbukara Pasanga’ thanks to the poor screenplay, written by director Samydurai himself". Malini Mannath of The New Indian Express wrote that "An insipid narration and a lacklustre script makes sure that we lose interest soon enough".
