= Thottupaar =

- Poster
- Directed by: K. V. Nandhu
- Produced by: Janaki Sivakumar
- Starring: Vidharth; Ramana; Lakshana
- Cinematography: Rathinavelu
- Music by: Srikanth Deva
- Production company: Tholl Paavai Films
- Distributed by: S. Thanu
- Release date: 15 October 2010
- Country: India
- Language: Tamil

Thottupaar (transl. Try touching me) is an Indian Tamil-language action film written and directed by newcomer K. V. Nandhu and produced by Janaki Sivakumar. The film, which starred Vidharth, Ramana and Lakshana in leading roles, released on 15 October 2010.

== Cast ==
- Vidharth as Maharaja
- Ramana as Lingam
- Lakshana as Kanimozhi
- Cochin Haneefa
- Jagan
- Dinesh Lamba
- Azhagam Perumal
- Anu Haasan
- Manobala
- Mayilsamy
- Ragasya as item number

== Production ==
Actor Vidharth played the lead role for the first time in his career, though the failure of the film meant that Mynaa (2010) is often noted as his leading debut. The film's director Nandhu had previously apprenticed under Perarasu.

== Soundtrack ==
The soundtrack is composed by Srikanth Deva. It includes a remixed version of "Aadi Maasam Kaathadikka" from the 1983 film Paayum Puli.

Song	Singers	Lyrics
"Aadi Maasam"	Udit Narayan, Anuradha Sriram	Vaali
"Oolavediye"	Silambarasan, Suchitra	Perarasu
"Seemasirikki"	Jassie Gift, Anitha Karthikeyan, Mamiboys	Vijay Sagar
"Thottu Thottu"	Sadhana Sargam	Viveka
"Usurula"	Sangeetha Sajith, Srikanth Deva	Viveka

== Release and reception ==
The film was released on 15 October 2010. A critic from Sify labelled the film as a "big bore", adding that "the film lacks a cohesive narration and screenplay". Another reviewer cited that the film was a "can't watch". The New Indian Express wrote, "The song-dance sequences follow in quick succession disturbing the flow and pace", adding, "The director has tried to infuse an element of realism in the earlier part. The script could have been etched in a more coherent and a convincing way when the scene shifts to the city".
