= Reba Monica John =

Indian actress and model

- Born: 4 February 1994 (age 32); Bangalore, Karnataka, India
- Occupations: Actress; model
- Years active: 2016 – present
- Spouse: Joemon Joseph (m. 2022)

Reba Monica John (born 4 February 1994) is an Indian actress and model who works prominently in Tamil, Malayalam and Telugu launguage films. She made her acting debut with a supporting role in a Malayalam film Jacobinte Swargarajyam (2016), later made her Tamil debut with Jarugandi (2018).

== Early and personal life ==
Reba Monica John was born on 4 February 1994 into a Malayalee family in Bangalore. Her middle and last names are from her grandparents. She married Joemon Joseph in 2022.

== Career ==
In 2016, she made her debut in the Malayalam film industry through Jacobinte Swargarajyam, directed by Vineeth Sreenivasan.

== Filmography ==
Key
†	Denotes films that have not yet been released

Year	Title	Role(s)	Language(s)	Notes	Ref.
2016	Jacobinte Swargarajyam	Chippy	Malayalam	Debut Film	
2017	Paippin Chuvattile Pranayam	Teena Kunjachan	Malayalam	Debut as Lead Actress in Malayalam	
2018	Jarugandi	Keerthi	Tamil	Tamil Debut	
2019	Mikhael	Anna	Malayalam	Cameo appearance	
2019	Bigil	Anitha	Tamil		
2019	Dhanusu Raasi Neyargale	Anitha	Tamil		
2020	Forensic	Dr. Shikha Damodar	Malayalam		
2021	Rathnan Prapancha	Mayuri	Kannada	Kannada Debut; Nominated—Filmfare Award for Best Actress – Kannada	
2022	FIR	Archana Krishnamoorthy	Tamil		
2022	Innale Vare	Aishu	Malayalam		
2023	Boo	Meera	Tamil; Telugu	Bilingual film; Telugu Debut	
2023	Samajavaragamana	Sarayu	Telugu	Debut as Lead Actress in Telugu	
2023	Rajni	Shilpa	Malayalam	Bilingual film	
2023	Aval Peyar Rajni	Shilpa	Tamil	Bilingual film	
2024	Mazaiyil Nanaigiren	Aishwarya	Tamil		
2025	Mad Square	Swathi Reddy	Telugu	Special appearance in the song "Swathi Reddy"	
2025	Single	Ileana	Telugu	Cameo appearance	
2025	Coolie	Revathi Rajasekar	Tamil		
2025	Dheeram	Sradha Das / Kalyani	Malayalam		
2026	Mrithyunjay	ACP Seetha Parasuram IPS	Telugu		
2026	Jana Nayagan		Tamil		
TBA	Sakalakala Vallabha †	Kadambari	Kannada	Delayed	

=== Television ===
Year	Title	Roles	Language	Network	Notes	Ref.
2013	Midukki	Contestant	Malayalam	Mazhavil Manorama	2nd Runner-up	
2022	Akash Vaani	Vaani	Tamil	Aha Tamil		

=== Music video ===
Year	Title	Music by	Language	Label	Notes	Ref
2021	"Kutty Pattas"	Santhosh Dhayanidhi	Tamil	Sony Music	Co-starring Ashwin Kumar Lakshmikanthan	
