= Dreams (2004 film) =

- Poster
- Directed by: Kasthuri Raja
- Written by: Kasthuri Raja
- Produced by: Saraswathi Srikanth
- Starring: Dhanush; Diya; Parul Yadav
- Cinematography: Kichas
- Music by: Bharadwaj
- Production company: Akshay Films
- Distributed by: Kalasangham Films
- Release date: 11 November 2004
- Country: India
- Language: Tamil

Dreams is a 2004 Indian Tamil-language erotic romance film directed by Kasthuri Raja and produced by Saraswathi Srikanth. The film stars the director's youngest son Dhanush, with Diya and Parul Yadav as the lead actresses. The music was composed by Bharadwaj with cinematography by Kichas. The film was released on 11 November 2004 and became a box office failure.

== Plot ==
Shakti, a young man, is spoilt by his father and leads a wayward life. However, when he falls in love, he works on changing himself for the better but things take a turn for the worse.

== Cast ==
- Dhanush as Shakthi
- Diya as Shruti
- Parul Yadav as Charu
- Pyramid Natarajan as Ramanathan
- Rajyalakshmi as Lakshmi
- Kaajal Pasupathi as Shakthi's friend
- Ram G as Guna
- Manobala as Moosa
- Thalaivasal Vijay as Mahendran, Shruti's father
- Kuyili as Pattu
- Nithin Sathya as Shiva, Shakthi's friend
- Rajesh as Lawyer Varadharajan
- Poovilangu Mohan as Appu Kuttan
- Karthik Sabesh
- Aryan
- Bala Singh
- Sujibala
- Vasanthi in a special appearance

== Production ==
The film began production shortly after the success of director Kasthuri Raja and actor Dhanush's Thulluvadho Ilamai in 2002, but as Dhanush's Kaadhal Kondein (2003) became a major success, Dreams was stalled as he began signing numerous projects. When production resumed, Kasthuri Raja scrapped the earlier footage and started anew due to changes in Dhanush's appearance causing continuity issues. Near the release in late 2004, Kasthuri Raja and the producer Srikanth were engaged in legal and financial issues.

== Soundtrack ==
The music was composed by Bharadwaj, with lyrics by Kasthuri Raja.

Track listing
No.	Title	Singer(s)	Length
1.	"Alai Alaiyai"	Tippu, Malathi	5:25
2.	"Appa Amma"	Nithish Gopalan, Ranjith, Mahathi	5:29
3.	"Unnai Unnai"	Harish Raghavendra, Camli	5:33
4.	"Uyire Uyire"	Harish Raghavendra	6:04
5.	"Payyanukku Meesa Vandha"	Nitish Gopalan, Kaushik	4:48
6.	"Oh Penne"	P. Unnikrishnan	5:57
7.	"Dreams Music" (Instrumental)		4:54
8.	"Violin" (Instrumental)		3:57
Total length:			42:07

== Release ==
Dreams was released on 11 November 2004, during Diwali. It opened up against Attahasam, Chatrapathy, Manmadhan and Neranja Manasu. The film became a box office failure.

== Critical reception ==
Sify wrote "Dreams has no style in presentation or any logic story wise. The plot is far-fetched and by the end you can’t figure out what’s happening to the screenplay that has gone haywire". Malathi Rangarajan of The Hindu wrote "You only hope that Dhanush does some serious retrospection and in future chooses films with care. He should not relent even for the sake of dad's dream projects. After all, having acquired such incredible fan following in a very short while, he cannot afford to be reckless". Malini Mannath of Chennai Online called it "a technically well-packaged film, with a thoughtfully-written script, aesthetically taken shots, with appealing music and camera work, and a relevant message for the younger generation and the parents".
