= Thakita Thakita =

- Movie Poster
- Directed by: Sreehari Nanu
- Screenplay by: Sreehari Nanu
- Story by: Kona Venkat; Sreehari Nanu
- Produced by: Bharat Thakur
- Starring: Harshvardhan Rane; Haripriya; Aditi Chengappa; Ananth Krishnamurthy; Karthik Sabesh; Trinetrudu; Eva Ellis; Bhakti Punjani; Waheeda; Swati Rajput
- Cinematography: K. K. Senthil Kumar
- Edited by: Marthand K. Venkatesh
- Music by: Bobo Shashi
- Production company: Down Town Films
- Release date: 3 September 2010
- Running time: 137 mins
- Country: India
- Language: Telugu

Thakita Thakita is a 2010 Indian Telugu-language coming-of-age film directed by Sreehari Nanu and produced by Bharat Thakur. The film features an ensemble cast of characters including Harshvardhan Rane, Haripriya, Aditi Chengappa, Ananth Krishnamurthy, and Karthik Sabesh. The film has music by Bobo Shashi, cinematography by K. K. Senthil Kumar, and editing by Marthand K. Venkatesh. The film was released on 3 September 2010.

The film marks the production debut of Telugu actress Bhumika Chawla and her husband Bharat Thakur. The film was dubbed in Tamil as Thulli Ezhunthathu Kadhal in 2012.

== Cast ==
- Harshvardhan Rane as Sridhar "Sri"
- Haripriya as Chandana
- Ananth Krishnamurthy as Kishore
- Aditi Chengappa as Nandini "Aandaalu"
- Karthik Sabesh as Scud
- Trinetrudu as Mahesh
- Eva Ellis as Jessica
- Bhakti Punjani as Bhakti
- Waheeda as Dakshayini
- Bhumika Chawla as Vishali
- Swati Rajput as Hasini
- Cochin Haneefa as Alagappan (Nandini's father)
- Naramalli Sivaprasad as Sri's father
- Anitha Nath as Sri's mother
- Shanoor Sana as Chandana's mother
- Arun Kumar as Chandana's father
- Sandya Jhanak as Arjun's mother
- Sandra Jaichandran as Nandini's sister
- Master Sangeeth Sobhan as Nandini's brother
- Chitram Srinu
- Arpita as Arpita
- Samrat as Arjun
- Apoorva as police officer
- M. S. Narayana as taxi driver

Cameo appearances

- Krishnam Raju
- Nagarjuna as Nag
- Anushka Shetty as Sweety

== Production ==
The film was shot in Bengaluru, Hyderabad (including Rajiv Gandhi International Airport), the Himalayas, and Visakhapatnam. Apart from helping with scripting and editing, Bhumika Chawla appeared in a 30-minute role as a lecturer.

== Soundtrack ==
Thakita Thakita

Film score by Bobo Shashi
- Released: 14 August 2010
- Genre: Soundtrack
- Length: 31:28
- Producer: Bobo Shashi

Bobo Shashi chronology
Bindaas (2010)	Thakita Thakita (2010)	Uu Kodathara? Ulikki Padathara? (2012)

The music was composed by Bobo Shashi. Karthik of Milliblog wrote, "Bobo Shashi shows tremendous promise post his Tamil debut!"

No.	Title	Lyrics	Singer(s)	Length
1.	"C'mon C'mon"	Viswa	Karthik, Sam, SuVi, Ranina Reddy, Bizmac	4:27
2.	"Ishq Hai Yeh"	Vanamali	Prasanna, Shreya Ghoshal	5:08
3.	"Mila Milalaa"	Bhaskarabhatla	Satyam	4:05
4.	"Thakita Thakita"	Viswa	Sam, Ujjayini Roy, Ramee	4:24
5.	"Manase Ato Ito"	Bhaskarabhatla	Karthik, Chinmayi Sripada	4:55
6.	"Kannire Olikenule"	Viswa	Bobo Sashi	3:54
7.	"Mila Milalaa (Remix)"	Bhaskarabhatla	Satyam, Srik, Shivam, Dinesh K	4:35
Total length:				31:28

== Reception ==
Radhika Rajamani of Rediff.com rated the film 2.5/5 stars and wrote, "There is nothing drastically different in Thakita Thakita, but it is refreshing because of the new faces, good music and cinematography". Echoing the same, Malini Mannath of The New Indian Express wrote, "Humorous at few places, it however offers nothing novel by way of script or presentation".
