= Satish Kaushik =

Indian actor and filmmaker (1956–2023)

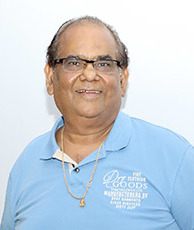
- Kaushik in 2017
- Born: Sateesh Chandra Kaushik; 13 April 1956; Dhanunda, Mahendragarh, Haryana, India
- Died: 9 March 2023 (aged 66); Gurgaon, Haryana, India
- Education: Kirori Mal College, Delhi University; National School of Drama; Film and Television Institute of India
- Occupations: Actor; filmmaker; screenwriter; comedian
- Years active: 1981–2023
- Works: Filmography
- Spouse: Shashi Kaushik (m. 1985)
- Children: 2

Satish Chandra Kaushik (13 April 1956 – 9 March 2023) was an Indian actor, director, producer, comedian, editor and screenwriter. He found fame in Bollywood with Mr. India starring Anil Kapoor, Sridevi, and Amrish Puri, where he played the iconic character of a cook named Calendar. He later directed films such as Tere Naam.

== Early life ==
Kaushik was born in Karol Bagh, Delhi on 13 April 1956 into a Gaur Brahmin family. He graduated from Kirori Mal College, Delhi University in 1972. He was an alumnus of National School of Drama and Film and Television Institute of India.

== Career ==
As a film actor, he was noted for his roles as "Calendar" in Mr. India, as Pappu Pager in Deewana Mastana, and as "Chanu Ahmed" in Sarah Gavron's British film Brick Lane (2007). He won the Filmfare Best Comedian Award twice: in 1990 for Ram Lakhan and in 1997 for Saajan Chale Sasural.

As a theatre actor, his most noted role was that of "Willy Loman" in the Hindi-language play, Salesman Ramlal, an adaptation of Arthur Miller's Death of a Salesman. Kaushik wrote dialogues for Kundan Shah's comedy classic Jaane Bhi Do Yaaron (1983). His first film as a director was Anil Kapoor and Sridevi starrer Roop Ki Rani Choron Ka Raja (1993). His second directorial was Prem (1995), which was supposed to be Tabu's debut film. Both were box office disasters. He continued to make films and got his first hit with Hum Aapke Dil Mein Rehte Hain in 1999.

He co-wrote and anchored a TV countdown show, Top Ten, for which he won the Screen Videocon Award. In 2005, Kaushik directed Arjun Rampal, Amisha Patel, and Zayed Khan in Vaada. In 2007 Kaushik, together with Anupam Kher, who had been his classmate at NSD, launched a new film company called Karol Bagh Productions. Their first film, Teree Sang, was directed by Satish Kaushik. Starring Ruslaan Mumtaz and Sheena Shahabadi, the film explores of teen pregnancy.

His next work was to be based on the life of Tansen, in which the role of Tansen was to be played by Abhishek Bachchan, and the soundtrack was to be composed by Ravindra Jain; the script for the film remains unfinished. Kaushik was working to promote Haryana's film industry, and was committed to making several films there.

=== Chandigarh film city project ===
Kaushik was a partner in the Chandigarh film city project with real estate company Parsavnath Developers. They bought a 30-acre (12 ha) plot in Sarangpur Village, Chandigarh t a very attractive pricing.

== Personal life and death ==
Kaushik married Shashi in 1985. Their son, Shanu, died in 1996 at age two. In 2012, their daughter was born through a surrogate mother.

Kaushik died of a heart attack in Gurugram on 9 March 2023, at the age of 66.
