= Chandigarh film city =

In 2007, Parsvnath developers had planned developed the Chandigarh film city at Chandigarh with Satish Kaushik as technical advisor. The project has an agreement signed between Chandigarh Tourist Department and Parsvnath Developers. As per the agreement, the Developer will pay 191 Crore for a lease period of 99 years. The film city will have a film studio, multimedia Park, a multimedia entertainment center, a multimedia college and research center. The film city was to have been called Parsvnath Film city.

However, disputes between Parsvnath and the Punjab state government, which were contested through the courts, led to the collapse of the deal.

In December 2019 hopes were renewed, with the state government announcing plans to directly develop such a site.

== See also ==
- Film City
- Ramoji Film City
- Cinema of India
- Film and Television Institute of India
- State Institute of Film and Television
- Satyajit Ray Film and Television Institute
