= Mahabalipuram (film) =

2015 Indian film by Don Sandy

- Poster
- Directed by: Don Sandy
- Written by: Don Sandy
- Produced by: Vinayak
- Starring: Vinayak; Vithika Sheru; Karunakaran; Ramesh Thilak; Vettri; Karthik Sabesh; Angana Roy
- Narrated by: Sathyaraj
- Cinematography: Chandran Pattuswamy
- Edited by: Kim Aam
- Music by: K
- Production company: Clapboard Movies
- Release date: 13 March 2015
- Country: India
- Language: Tamil

Mahabalipuram is a 2015 Indian Tamil-language crime film written and directed by Don Sandy. The film features Vinayak, Karunakaran, Ramesh Thilak, Vettri, Vithika Sheru, Angana Roy, and Karthik Sabesh. K composed the film's music, while Chandran Pattuswamy handled the editing and Kim Aam handled the cinematography. The film, produced by Vinayak, released on 13 March 2015.

== Cast ==
- Vinayak as Panja
- Vithika Sheru as Mahalakshmi
- Karunakaran as Kumar
- Vettri as Sathish
- Ramesh Thilak as Kuppan
- Karthik Sabesh as Saamy
- Angana Roy as Sangeetha
- Jayakumar as Durai
- Supergood Subramani as Jailor

== Production ==
The film was first announced in November 2013, with director Don Sandy noting that the story was inspired by real life events which had occurred at Mahabalipuram. Featuring five rookie actors, the film was produced by Vinayak, previously seen in Lee and Kokki, who also features in a leading role. The team successfully approached Silambarasan to sing a song based on the New Year to feature in the soundtrack, and he recorded it in December 2013. The film was predominantly shot around Mahabalipuram, with one song shot in Bangkok. Actor Sathyaraj provided a voice-over for a sequence in the film.

In August 2014, the film's distribution rights were bought by Studio 9 Productions after gaining positive reviews at special screenings.

== Soundtrack ==
Mahabalipuram

Soundtrack album by K
- Released: 3 September 2014
- Genre: Film soundtrack
- Length: 19:44
- Language: Tamil
- Label: Saregama
- Producer: K

K chronology
Onbadhule Guru (2013)	Mahabalipuram (2014)	Pizza (2014)

The soundtrack was composed by K and officially released online on 3 September 2014.

Mahabalipuram (Original Motion Picture Soundtrack)
No.	Title	Lyrics	Singer(s)	Length
1.	"Athaadi Yenna Solla"	Yugabharathi	Haricharan	03:45
2.	"Usrey Nee"	Yugabharathi	Imman, Shakthi Sree Gopalan	04:22
3.	"Anantha Thendral"	Yugabharathi	Aalap Raju	03:29
4.	"Sethey Ponendi"	O. G. Dass	O. G. Dass	04:22
5.	"Kudiya Vedu"	Yugabharathi	K, Velmurugan	03:46
Total length:				19:44

== Critical reception ==
The Times of India gave the film 3 stars out of 5 and wrote, "Mahabalipuram starts off on a slow note but by the time it ends, it leaves one startled and shattered. Seldom has a story in recent times been told in such a gripping fashion that it makes it hard for one not to compliment director Don Sandy for his efforts...He deserves full marks for having made a film that not only scores as an entertainer but also seeks to create an awareness on a form of crime that society urgently needs to address". The New Indian Express wrote, "The screenplay with its twists and turns becomes more interesting as the story progresses. The episodes leading to the finale are handled impressively by the debutant director. At a crisp 111 minutes viewing time, Mahabalipuram is a fairly engaging watch". Rediff gave it 2 stars out of 5 and wrote, "Though the story line is interesting, the real issue seems to be lost in the poorly-written script...But with a running time of less than two hours, with some enjoyable music by composer K, and good performances, Mahabalipuram is a decent attempt".

Baradwaj Rangan wrote, "The quick way to sum up Mahabalipuram is that it's a veritable how-not-to manual. How not to write characters...How not to develop convincing situations...How not to sustain mood, atmosphere...How not to end up with another Subramaniyapuram". Sify called Mahabalipuram, "yet another film with a message with too many hiccups".
