= Dheeram =

- Directed by: Jithin Suresh T.
- Written by: Deepu S. Nair; Sandeep Sadanandan
- Produced by: Haris Ambazhathingal; Remosh M. S.
- Starring: Indrajith Sukumaran; Varalaxmi Sarathkumar; Divya Pillai; Reba Monica John; Renji Panicker; Nishanth Sagar; Aju Varghese
- Cinematography: Sougandh SU
- Edited by: Nagooran Ramachandran
- Music by: Manikandan Ayyappa
- Production companies: Malabar Talkies; Remo Entertainmentz
- Distributed by: Dream Big Films
- Release date: 5 December 2025
- Running time: 151 minutes
- Country: India
- Language: Malayalam

Dheeram (Courage) is a 2025 Indian Malayalam investigating crime thriller film written by Deepu S. Nair & Sandeep Sadanandan, directed by Jithin Suresh T. & Produced by Haris Ambazhathingal & Remosh MS. Starring Indrajith Sukumaran, Varalaxmi Sarathkumar, Divya Pillai, Renji Panicker, Reba Monica John, Nishanth Sagar & Aju Varghese

== Synopsis ==
ACP Stalin Joseph, who is famed for fearless methods shoots a prime suspect in a Chinnakanal murder. Weeks earlier in Calicut, the former I.G.'s son dies in a mall parking, drawing media pressure. FIR clashes with evidence. A second murder, a staged suicide, reveals college ties. A third follows; secrets drive the killer's "justice." Stalin faces law or executioner.

== Cast ==
- Indrajith Sukumaran as ACP Stalin Joseph IPS
- Varalaxmi Sarathkumar as Vimala Niranjan
- Divya Pillai as SI Diya Prabhakar
- Reba Monica John as Kalyani (Sradha Das)
- Renji Panicker as Commissioner Ramdas IPS
- Nishanth Sagar as SI Jose Thomas
- Aju Varghese as Hostel Warden
- Sagar Surya as George, Stalin's step brother
- Avanthika Mohan as Radhika
- Dinesh Panicker as School Principal
- Sreejith Ravi as Aravindan, Kalyani's father
- Sabitta George as Cicily, Stalin's mother
- Sundarapandiayan as SHO Basheer
- Devi Ajith as Enquiry Commission Head Fatima Beegam
- Sojan Angel Varghese as CI Selvaraghavan

== Release & Home Media ==
The Film released theatrically worldwide on 5 December 2025.

The film currently streams on Amazon Prime Video & manoramaMax

== Reception ==
A critic from The Indian Express rated the film 1 out of 5 stars and wrote, "While the director has the creative freedom to decide whether a scene should feature silence, ambient sound, or music, Dheeram stands as a testament to the cost a film must pay for misjudgments while making such choices". The film was also reviewed by Asianet News and Onmanorama.
