= Bindaas (2010 film) =

- Directed by: Veeru Potla
- Written by: Veeru Potla
- Produced by: Sunkara Ramabrahmam
- Starring: Manoj Manchu; Sheena Shahabadi
- Cinematography: R. Ramesh Babu
- Edited by: Marthand K. Venkatesh
- Music by: Bobo Shashi
- Production company: AK Entertainments ATV
- Release date: 5 February 2010
- Country: India
- Language: Telugu
- Budget: ₹3 crore
- Box office: est. ₹8 crore distributors' share

Bindaas (transl. Cool) is a 2010 Indian Telugu-language action comedy film directed by Veeru Potla starring Manoj Manchu and Sheena Shahabadi. The film was released on 5 February 2010. Made on a budget of ₹3 crore, the film collected a distributor's share of more than ₹8 crore and was considered a hit. Additionally, it was dubbed and released in Malayalam as Happy 2 Happy and remade in Kannada as Jinke Mari (2013). The film received two Nandi Awards.

== Plot ==
In Chittoor, powerful politicians Mahendra Naidu and Seshadri Naidu are locked in a long-standing feud over the district's MP seat. Though former MP Purushottam Naidu had brokered peace between their warring factions, tensions erupt again when the party leadership breaks tradition and backs the more popular Mahendra. Enraged, Seshadri plots Mahendra's assassination, but the plan collapses when Mahendra's men abduct his brother-in-law, Garika Naidu. The situation spirals further when Garika threatens to destroy Mahendra's family, forcing one of Mahendra's henchmen to kill him, leaving his widow Alivelu devastated. Stripped of both a lucrative mining contract and political power, Seshadri, his sons, and Alivelu swear a relentless vendetta against Mahendra and his family.

Mahendra brings his entire family to his village, reluctantly bringing along his estranged nephew Ajay, the son of his disowned brother Ramakrishna. Still infamous for trying to elope with his cousin Geetha on her wedding day, Ajay is unwelcome among the family members, except Mahendra's wife, his cousin Gayatri and the family servant Ramagiri. Unbothered, he delights in stirring trouble, especially teasing Girija, Bharath, and Muddu Krishna. While Girija despises him, Bharath secretly enjoys and supports Ajay's mischievous adventures.

Meanwhile, Seshadri's sons launch a failed assassination attempt on Mahendra based on Panthulu's tip-off. Keeping the attack secret from his family, Mahendra remains vigilant as Seshadri dispatches men to track his youngest son, Mrutyunjaya, who is determined to wipe out Mahendra's family. When Ajay rescues Girija from a raging bull, he finally reveals the truth behind the Geetha scandal: it was Geetha who wanted to elope, but Ajay rejected her and was wrongly blamed. Later, while sneaking out with Bharath and Krishna to buy a birthday cake, Ajay crosses paths with Mrutyunjaya's men and single-handedly defeats them after a fierce chase. However, his actions bring further trouble; despite Bharath's defence, the enraged Naidu family turns against Ajay, and Mahendra ultimately banishes him from the village. As he walks away alone, Ajay is haunted by memories of his father, who was cast out for choosing peace over violence and for his alleged role in his uncle's accidental death.

As the bloody rivalry escalates, Seshadri's sons, Peddodu and Sailendra, strike simultaneously, bombing Mahendra's convoy and residence. Realising the feud has spiralled beyond control, Mahendra offers to surrender the MP seat through Purushottam's mediation, but Seshadri rejects peace, consumed by his desire for vengeance. Determined to end the conflict himself, Ajay secretly infiltrates Seshadri's camp. Using blackmail and deception, he gains the trust of Seshadri's son-in-law Sarath and embeds himself within the enemy household under the guise of a fellow victim of Mahendra. From within, Ajay begins quietly dismantling the hatred, persuading Seshadri to delay his attacks, reuniting Peddodu with his wife, and helping Sailendra reconcile with his fiancee and her family.

At the same time, Ajay captures the hot-headed Mrutyunjaya before he can attack Mahendra's family, secretly sheltering him with the help of Gayatri and Ramagiri. However, Ajay's elaborate plan unravels during Sarath's son's naming ceremony when Panthulu exposes his true identity. Hunted by Peddodu and Sailendra, Ajay races against time as Mahendra's family learns that Mrutyunjaya is hidden in their village. When Narendra orders his execution, Gayatri frees him, only for the secret to be discovered. Faced with the truth, Gayatri, Girija, and Bharath reveal Ajay's plans to their family. Ajay is ambushed by Panthulu, who finally reveals the truth behind the bloodshed; he manipulated both the Naidu families to eliminate his political rivals and seize the MP seat for himself, aided by Purushottam, who had secretly leaked Ajay's mission. He further reveals that his own men were responsible for Garika Naidu's murder, before escaping. Ajay, Mahendra, Seshadri, and their families gather at the border between their villages. There, Ajay exposes Panthulu as the true mastermind behind Garika's death. Enraged by the revelation, Sailendra and Mrutyunjaya drag Panthulu away to face Alivelu's judgment. Ajay then confronts Purushottam, urging the ageing politician to retire with dignity rather than continue manipulating others for power. A remorseful Mahendra apologises to Ajay for misjudging him and welcomes him back home. Peace is finally sealed when Mrutyunjaya and Gayatri, who have fallen in love during the turmoil, get married, ending the feud. Girija proudly recounts Ajay's innocence in the Geetha elopement scandal to her friends, only for Geetha herself to appear and jokingly reveal that Ajay had, in fact, tried to run away with her. The shocking revelation sends an enraged Girija chasing Ajay through the wedding hall, ending the story on a humorous note.

== Cast ==
- Manoj Manchu as Ajay
- Sheena Shahabadi as Girija
- Ahuti Prasad as Mahendra Naidu
- Jaya Prakash Reddy as Seshadri Naidu
- Vennela Kishore as Muddu Krishna
- Subbaraju as Sailendra Naidu, Seshadri Naidu's second son
- Sunil as Sarath (Seshadri's son-in-law)
- Vijayakumar as Purushottam Naidu
- Rashmi Gautam as Geeta
- Jeeva as Garika Naidu
- Brahmanandam as Parabrahmam, Peddodu and Sailendra's paternal uncle
- M. S. Narayana as Mastan Baba
- Vijaya Rangaraju as Mahendra's uncle
- Bhanu Chander as Ramakrishna, Ajay's father and Mahendra Naidu's brother
- Geetha as Vasundhara Varma, Ajay's mother
- Raghu Babu as Raghu, Seshadri's brother-in-law
- Kalpana as Lakshmi
- Telangana Shakuntala as Alivelu, Seshadri Naidu's younger sister and Garika Naidu's wife
- Sudeepa Pinky as Mahendra's daughter
- Paruchuri Venkateswara Rao as Venkatachalam, Mahendra Naidu's father-in-law
- Supreeth as Peddodu, Seshadri's elder son
- Shravan as Mrutyunjaya naidu, Seshadri Naidu's youngest son
- Banerjee as Banerjee
- Y. Kasi Viswanath as Srinivas, Girija's father
- Master Bharath as Bharatha Simha Naidu "Bharath"
- Madhavi as Pinky
- Jayalakshmi
- Rajitha as Mahendra's sister
- Vajra Roshni Akurathi as Girija’s sister

== Soundtrack ==
The soundtrack was composed by Bobo Shashi in his Telugu film debut. The audio launch was held on 9 November 2009.

Bindaas

Soundtrack album by Bobo Shashi
- Released: 9 November 2009
- Genre: Film soundtrack
- Length: 34.28
- Label: A TV
- Producer: Bobo Shashi

Bobo Shashi chronology
Kulir 100° (2010)	Bindaas (2009)	Thakita Thakita (2010)

No.	Title	Lyrics	Artist(s)	Length
1.	"Bindaas"	Bhuvana Chandra	Ranjith, Mamiboys, MC Bullet, Coco Nanda	4:28
2.	"Suraangani"	Ramajogayya Sastry	Jassie Gift	4:57
3.	"Entamma Entamma"	Bhuvana Chandra	Karthik, Anuradha Sriram	4:52
4.	"Girija Girija"	Bhuvana Chandra	Karthik, Chinmayi	4:59
5.	"Jum Garagara"	Ramajogayya Sastry	Shivam, Suchitra	4:10

== Reception ==
Bindaas received generally positive reviews. Jeevi of Idlebrain.com rated the film three out of five and stated "Manoj Manchu brought a new perspective to his character with his extremely cool attitude and deserves a huge round of applause for his terrific work in this movie". Industry pundits have declared it as the biggest hit of Manoj's career. A critic from Rediff.com wrote that "All in all, Bindaas is one of those films which provides entertainment unlimited but with a cliched storyline. Watch it for Manoj".

== Awards ==
Nandi Awards

- Special Jury Award - Manoj Manchu
- Best Child Actor - Master Bharath
