= Archenaa Ravi =

Indian model (born 1996)

- Born: 17 June 1996 (age 30); Trivandrum, Kerala, India
- Occupations: Actress; Model; beauty pageant titleholder
- Height: 5 ft 7 in (1.70 m)
- Beauty pageant titleholder
- Title: Miss Super Globe 1st Runner up
- Years active: 2016–present
- Hair color: Black
- Eye color: Hazel Brown
- Major competitions: Miss South India 2016 (1st Runner-up); Miss Super Globe International 2018 (1st Runner-up); Femina Miss India Kerala 2019 (Top 3); Miss Diva 2020 (Top 10); Glamanand Supermodel India 2021 (Top 8)

Archenaa Ravi (born 17 June 1996) is an Indian female model, beauty pageant holder, actress, and classical dancer. In February 2019, she initiated a campaign called "Buddy Project" to empower children.

== Career ==
Archenaa Ravi started her career as a model and then ventured into the film industry thereby making her Tamil cinema debut with the 2017 film Attu. After that, she again entered into modelling and went on to become a youth icon by participating at global beauty pageant contests. She participated in the Femina Miss India 2019 Kerala pageant and ended up as one of the Top 3 Miss India Kerala 2019 finalist. Later, she became one of the Top 10 finalists of Miss Universe India 2020. In the year 2021, she became the official finalist for Glamanand Supermodel India 2021 edition, which selects representatives for Miss International 2021 and Miss Multinational 2021. The finals will be held on August 23, 2021, and the talent round and preliminary competition will be held on August 20, 2021.

== Filmography ==
Year	Film	Role	Language	Ref.
2017	Attu	Sundari	Tamil	
2026	Nee Forever	Mathi	Tamil	
