= Hostel (2022 film) =

2022 Indian film

- Theatrical release poster
- Directed by: Sumanth Radhakrishnan
- Screenplay by: Sumanth Radhakrishnan
- Based on: Adi Kapyare Kootamani by John Varghese
- Produced by: R Ravindran
- Starring: Ashok Selvan; Priya Bhavani Shankar; Sathish
- Cinematography: Praveen Kumar
- Edited by: Ragul
- Music by: Bobo Shashi
- Production company: Trident Arts
- Release date: 28 April 2022
- Country: India
- Language: Tamil

Hostel is a 2022 Indian Tamil-language comedy horror film directed by Sumanth Radhakrishnan and produced by Trident Arts. The film is a remake of the 2015 Malayalam film Adi Kapyare Kootamani co-written and directed by John Varghese. The film stars Ashok Selvan and Priya Bhavani Shankar with a supporting cast including Sathish, Nassar and Munishkanth. The film's music is composed by Bobo Shashi, with cinematography handled by Praveen Kumar and editing done by Ragul. The film was released in theatres on 28 April 2022.

== Synopsis ==
Adhirshtalakshmi encounters Kathir in the park and realizes that he is hit by financial issues. She offers a huge sum to get him out of the trouble and in return, asks him to take her into the boys hostel where he stays. Kathir finds it a fair deal and takes her into the hostel as promised. What follows is a fun ride as she gets trapped in there among the bunch of hostelites, the strict warden and his assistant Sathappan. Why Adhirshtalakshmi wanted to enter the hostel and what's so mysterious about the place form the rest of the film's story.

== Cast ==
- Ashok Selvan as Kathir
- Priya Bhavani Shankar as Adhirshtalakshmi
- Sathish as Jeeva
- Nassar as Father Kuriakose
- Munishkanth as Saathappan
- KPY Yogi as Bootha Paandi
- Krrish S. Kumar as Joshua
- Aranthangi Nisha as “Burdha” Parvin (Ghost)
- Ravi Mariya as Interest Indhran, Adhirshtalakshmi's father
- Kalairani as Ammaachi
- Namo Narayana as Kathir’s uncle
- Bava Lakshmanan as Cylinder

== Soundtrack ==
The soundtrack and score is composed by Bobo Shashi and the album featured one song. The audio rights were acquired by Muzik 247.

Track listing
No.	Title	Lyrics	Singer(s)	Length
1.	"Hostel Gaana"	Gaana Edwin	Deva	3:38
2.	"Mica Buddys"	Yuki Praveen	Bobo Shashi	3:55

== Reception ==
The film opened to mixed reviews. Logesh Balachandran of The Times of India rated the film with 2/5 stars, stating that, "While the original had its one-liners and comedy of errors rightly placed, the remake is bit chaotic and looks like its lost in translation." Siby Jeyya of India Herald wrote, "The film, which was a smash blockbuster in Malayalam, could have been even better if it had been more subdued." Navein Darshan of Cinema Express gave the rating 1.5 out of 5 stars and called the film "a problematic dull horror comedy".Dinamalar critic gave 1.5 rating out of 5
