= Riya Bamniyal =

Indian actress

- Born: India
- Occupations: Model, actress
- Years active: 2007 – present

Riya Bamniyal is an Indian actress who has appeared in Hindi and Tamil films. She made her film debut with the 2009 Tamil film, Kulir 100°. She won the third season of Indian reality television show, Splitsvilla, before making her debut in Hindi with Y-Films' Luv Ka The End in 2011.

== Filmography ==
Year	Film	Role	Language	Notes
2009	Kulir 100°	Tanya	Tamil	
2011	Luv Ka The End	Natasha Oberoi	Hindi	

== Television ==
- Splitsvilla (2009 – 2010)
- Yeh Hai Aashiqui (2013 – 2016)

== See also ==
- Unnati Davara
