= Mirg (film) =

- Theatrical release poster
- Directed by: Tarun Sharma
- Written by: Tarun Sharma
- Produced by: Rishi Anand; Tarun Sharma; Shwetaabh Singh
- Starring: Satish Kaushik; Anup Soni; Shwetaabh Singh; Raj Babbar
- Cinematography: Rahul Deep; Mayank Khurana
- Edited by: Sriram Raja
- Music by: Anshul Takkar
- Production companies: Studio RA; NaMA Productions; OneShot Films
- Release date: 9 February 2024
- Running time: 83 minutes
- Country: India
- Language: Hindi

Mirg is a 2024 Indian Hindi-language action film directed and written by Tarun Sharma. The film stars Satish Kaushik, Anup Soni, Shwetaabh Singh and Raj Babbar. It was theatrically released on 9 February 2024.

== Cast ==
- Satish Kaushik as Ravi
- Anup Soni as Bulldozer Bhai
- Shwetaabh Singh as Anil
- Raj Babbar as Bhaisahab
- Raghav Kakker as Shanky

== Production ==
The film was mainly shot in Himachal Pradesh before wrapping up in March 2023.

== Release ==
Mirg was theatrically released on 9 February 2024. The film was premiered on JioCinema from 25 October 2024.

== Reception ==
Archika Khurana of The Times of India rated the film 2.5 stars out of 5. A critic from Times Now gave the film 3/5 stars.
