= Teree Sang =

- Theatrical Poster
- Directed by: Satish Kaushik
- Written by: Jainendra Jain
- Produced by: Bharat Shah; Anupam Kher
- Starring: Ruslaan Mumtaz; Sheena Shahabadi; Rajat Kapoor; Neena Gupta; Satish Kaushik; Sushmita Mukherjee
- Cinematography: Sethu Sriram
- Edited by: Hemal Kothari
- Music by: Sachin–Jigar; Anu Malik; Bappi Lahiri
- Distributed by: Columbia Pictures (though SPE Films India)
- Release date: 7 August 2009
- Country: India
- Language: Hindi

Teree Sang is a 2009 Indian Hindi-language coming of age romantic film directed by Satish Kaushik, starring Ruslaan Mumtaz and Sheena Shahabadi in her first role. Teree Sang explores the issue of teen pregnancy.

== Plot ==
Maahi Puri is a 15-year-old girl who is the only child of a high-class family. Kabir is a 17-year-old from a lower-middle-class family. As they become friends, they are attracted to each other's lives. Their friendship and intimacy grow day by day. On a New Year's Eve camping trip, the young couple have sex, and Maahi becomes pregnant. Both sets of parents oppose her carrying the pregnancy to term, and the young couple runs away together. Maahi refuses to have an abortion. Kabir and Maahi's friends take them to an abandoned cottage, where they stay to protect their unborn child.

The four worried parents have no choice but to work together to find their children. Kabir's parents overhear his friends talking about where he might be and go look for them. Meanwhile, Kabir finds a job at a construction site and then as a gas delivery agent to earn money to support his family. Maahi keeps the house clean, cooks every day, and secretly sells fruit.

When the parents find the two, the young couple tries to flee. Catching up with them, the parents realise they are allies. While all six are traveling together in a bus, Maahi goes into labour. The group takes Maahi to a hospital, where she gives birth to a boy.

Kabir faces charges as a result of a lawyer fighting the teen pregnancy case. Having come to accept the couple's relationship, Maahi's father opposes the lawyer and Kabir is sentenced to 3 months' remand.

== Cast ==
- Ruslaan Mumtaz as Kabir Punjabi "Kuku"
- Sheena Shahabadi as Maahi Puri
- Satish Kaushik as Narender Punjabi, Kabir's father
- Sushmita Mukherjee as Sushma Punjabi, Kabir's mother
- Rajat Kapoor as Barrister Mohit Puri, Maahi's father
- Neena Gupta as Paakhi Puri, Maahi's mother
- Anupam Kher as Judge, Special appearance

== Soundtrack ==
The soundtrack album has eight songs composed by Sachin–Jigar, Anu Malik and Bappi Lahiri. All lyrics written by Sameer Anjaan and Virag Mishra.

=== Track listings ===
No.	Title	Singer(s)	Music director	Lyrics	Duration
1	"Chal Mera Haath Pakad Le"	Anmol Malik	Anu Malik	Sameer	4:58
2	"I Will Be There For You"	Clinton Cerejo, Dominique Cerejo	Sachin–Jigar	Sameer	4:50
3	"Lal Quile Ke Peechey"	Shaan, Anmol Malik	Anu Malik	Sameer	5:47
4	"Leja Lela"	Master Saleem, Jahnvi Shrimankar	Sachin–Jigar	Sameer	4:58
5	"Maula Mila De"	Suhail Kaul, Sachin Sanghvi, Jigar Saraiya	Sachin–Jigar	Sameer	4:25
6	"Miss Baabloo"	Bappi Lahiri	Bappi Lahiri	Virag Mishra	2:56
7	"Morey Saiyan"	Sachin Sanghvi, Jigar Saraiya	Sachin–Jigar	Sameer	4:58
8	"Rab Milya"	Sachin Sanghvi, Jigar Saraiya	Sachin–Jigar	Sameer	5:12
9	"Tere Bin"	Raja Hasan, Bappi Lahiri, Sumedha Karmahe	Bappi Lahiri	Virag Mishra	5:23

== Reception ==
Taran Adarsh of Bollywood Hungama gave the film 2.5 out of 5, writing "Ruslaan underplays his part beautifully. The best part is, it's not one of those conventional roles that show the hero flexing his muscles or beating up 10 people at the same time. He enacts the boy next door part with complete understanding. Sheena is a surprise. Dew-fresh and adorable, the debutante looks perfect for the part. Her confidence and performance, both are wonderful. Rajat Kapoor is excellent. Neena Gupta is natural. Satish Kaushik delivers a winning performance. The viewers will love him. Sushmita Mukherjee Bundela is first-rate. Anupam Kher, in a brief role, is perfect. On the whole, TEREE SANG has a new story tell and that is its biggest USP." Shubhra Gupta of The Indian Express gave the film 2 out of 5, "The central idea has been stolen from Juno, bittersweet indie Hollywood hit about teenage pregnancy and parenthood and responsibility. If only Satish Kaushik had retained more of the honesty of the original, Tere Sang would have been a revolutionary Hindi film." Sukanya Verma of Rediff.com gave the film 1 out of 5, writing "Coming to the kids in this Kidult caper, why do they speak to each other like Koi... Mil Gaya's Hrithik Roshan? Ruslaan and Sheena are neither experienced enough to shoulder the burden of badly written roles nor charismatic enough to project irresistible screen presence. Unlike Kya Kehna, despite its glaring flaws and excessive sentiment, Teree Sang evokes no sympathy nor merit debate or discussion."
