= Bobo Shashi =

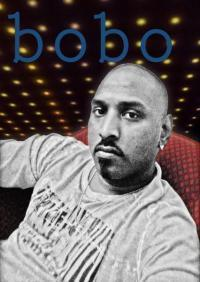

Background information
- Also known as: Bobo
- Born: 12 October 1981 (age 45); Chennai, Tamil Nadu, India
- Genre: Film score
- Occupations: Composer, music director, singer, instrumentalist, arranger, programmer, Beat Producer
- Years active: 2009–present

Sasikanth, better known as Bobo Shashi (born 12 October 1981), is an Indian film composer and singer.

== Biography and career ==
Shashi's father Murali is a famous composer who composes along with his brother Sabesh as Sabesh–Murali. His uncle Deva is a popular music composer.

His first movie for which he composed music was Kulir 100° (2009). The soundtrack won critical acclaim. A year later, after his first film released, he started to compose music for Telugu films. His Telugu film debut was Bindaas, followed by Thakita Thakita.

In 2012, Shashi composed the music for Uu Kodathara? Ulikki Padathara?. Out of the six songs he composed in the movie, he composed five (with the sixth being composed by Vidyasagar). In 2016, he composed one song (along with Karunas) from the movie Kadavul Irukaan Kumaru, composed by G. V. Prakash Kumar. In 2018, he composed the music for Jarugandi. In 2022, he composed the music for Hostel.

== Filmography ==
=== As music director ===
Year	Film	Language	Notes
2009	Kulir 100°	Tamil	
2010	Bindaas	Telugu	
2010	Thakita Thakita	Telugu	Dubbed in Tamil as Thulli Ezhunthathu Kaadhal
2012	Uu Kodathara? Ulikki Padathara?	Telugu	Composed five songs
2016	Kadavul Irukaan Kumaru	Tamil	Composed one song (Locality Boys) with Karunas
2017	Attu	Tamil	
2018	Jarugandi	Tamil	
2022	Hostel	Tamil	
2023	Dinosaurs	Tamil	
2024	Pei Kathai	Tamil	
2025	Varunan	Tamil	

=== As playback singer ===
Year	Film	Language	Song	Composer
2008	Kulir 100°	Tamil	"Boom"	Himself
2008	Kulir 100°	Tamil	"Siragindri Parakkalam"	Himself
2010	Thakita Thakita	Telugu	"Kannire Olikenule"	Himself
2012	Andala Rakshasi	Telugu	"Ye Manthramo"	Radhan
2015	Thani Oruvan	Tamil	"Thani Oruvan (The Power of One)"	Hiphop Tamizha
2017	Kadhal Kan Kattudhe	Tamil	"Unn Kanavukal"	Pavan
2017	Attu	Tamil	"Ora Kannal"	Himself
2018	Husharu	Telugu	"Na Na Na"	Radhan
2019	Boomerang	Tamil	"Vaan Thodave"	Radhan
2019	Boomerang	Tamil	"Mughaiyazhi (Instrumental Version)"	Radhan
2022	Hostel	Tamil	"Mica Buddys"	Himself
2023	Dinosaurs	Tamil	"Tata Tata"	Himself
2024	Maanbumigu Parai	Tamil	"Parai Parai"	Deva

=== As Beat Producer ===
Year	Album	Language	Song	Artist
2012	Mama Puma	Tamil	"Mama Puma"	Coco Nantha
2012	Mama Puma	Tamil	"I'm Steady"	Coco Nantha
2012	Mama Puma	Tamil	"Imaya Malayin"	Coco Nantha
2012	Mama Puma	Tamil	"Theeratha Vilayaattu Baby"	Coco Nantha
2012	Mama Puma	Tamil	"Gatek Gatek"	Coco Nantha
2012	Mama Puma	Tamil	"Thozharey"	Coco Nantha
2012	Mama Puma	Tamil	"Mama Puma Remix"	Coco Nantha
2014	Pengalin Sirappu	Tamil	"Pengalin Sirappu"	Tupakeys
2021	Ketta Kelu	Tamil	"God Damn Money"	Yuki Praveen
2024	Thamizh Vellum	Tamil	"Thamizh Vellum"	Yuki Praveen
