= Sheena Shahabadi =

Indian film actress (born 1986)

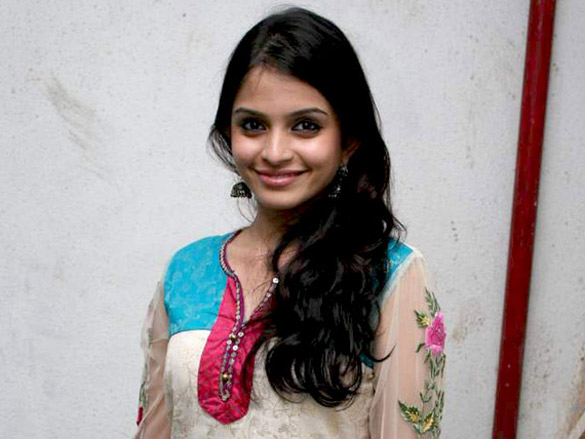
- Sheena in 2012
- Born: 10 April 1986 (age 40); Bombay, Maharashtra, India
- Occupation: Actress
- Years active: 2009–2019
- Spouse: Vaibhav Gore (m. 2007)
- Mother: Sadhana Singh

Sheena Shahabadi (born 10 April 1986) is an Indian actress. Her first film role was starring in the film Teree Sang (2009).

She is the daughter of Rajkumar Shahbadi and actress Sadhana Singh. She became interested in acting because of her mother's work.

Shahabadi was married to Vaibhav Gore in 2007.

== Filmography ==
| Year | Film | Role | Language | Source |
|---|---|---|---|---|
| 2009 | Teree Sang | Maahi | Hindi | |
| 2010 | Bindaas | Girija | Telugu | |
| 2011 | Tolisariga | | Telugu | |
| 2011 | Rajadhani | | Kannada | |
| 2012 | Nandeeswarudu | Pragathi | Telugu | |
| 2013 | I, Me, aur Main | Amala | Hindi | |
| 2013 | Action 3D | Shruthi | Telugu | |
| 2013 | Soni De Nakhre | Vedika | Hindi | |
| 2013 | Raqt | Suhani | Hindi | |
| 2014 | Nuvve Na Bangaram | Haritha | Telugu | |
| 2015 | Gaddam Gang | Shailu, Shalini Gupta | Telugu | Dual role |
| 2017 | Big F | Avni | Hindi | TV series |
| 2019 | Pyaar Tune Kya Kiya | Meera | Hindi | TV series |
