= Attu (film) =

2017 Indian film by Rathan Lingaa

- Theatrical release poster
- Directed by: Rathan Lingaa
- Written by: Rathan Lingaa
- Produced by: S. Anbalagan; R. K. Suresh
- Starring: Rishi Rithvik; Archana Ravi
- Cinematography: Ramalingam
- Edited by: LVK Das
- Music by: Bobo Shashi
- Production companies: Dream Icon; Studio 9 Production
- Release date: 31 March 2017
- Country: India
- Language: Tamil

Attu (transl. Someone uncontrollable) (Note: The title means duplicate in Madras Bashai and is used to refer to someone who is uncontrollable. The name has Burmese origins.) is a 2017 Indian Tamil-language gangster film directed by Rathan Lingaa, who previously directed the short film Blood Revolution. The film stars newcomers Rishi Rithvik and Archana Ravi.

== Cast ==
- Rishi Rithvik as Attu
- Archana Ravi as Sundari
- Yogi Babu as Sappa
- Prabha as Uluva
- Dheena as Pulinathope Jaya
- Rajasekhar as Das
- Bala Singh in a guest appearance
- Thirumugan (uncredited)

== Production ==
Rishi Ritwik, who previously worked as a computer science engineer and athlete, interacted with gangsters for six months to prepare for his role in the film.

== Soundtrack ==
The music for Attu was composed by Bobo Shashi.

Attu – Soundtrack album
No.	Title	Singer(s)	Length
1	"Attu Payyan"	Tupakeys, Bobo Shashi, Gana Palani	3:34
2	"Ora Kannaal"	Muba, Bobo Shashi, Hyde	4:11
3	"Ding Ding Digaana"	L. R. Eswari, Darryl, Rico	4:21
4	"Meraludhu Leraludhu"	Nathan, Deva, Yuki	4:03
5	"Kai Neraya Kannadi"	Sindhal Sedhu, Hyde, Gana Edwin	2:11
6	"Ora Kannaal – 1"	Bobo Shashi	4:12
7	"Ding Ding Digaana – 1"	L. R. Eswari	4:21

== Release ==
Chitra Deepa Anandram of The Hindu opined that "The manner in which debutant director Rathan Linga has perceived each and every scene in Attu, and the detailing that goes in in creating those scenes, tell a lot about his directorial brilliance". A critic from Samayam Tamil gave the film a rating of two out of five stars. A critic from The New Indian Express opined that "All said, Attu delivers far more than you’d have expected from a debutant filmmaker making a fairly anonymous film". Behindwoods noted that "On the whole, Attu is a life, rather than a film and has a decent story to back it up. It majorly deals with friendship, love, trust, gangsters and a lot of other entities that the characters coexist with". A critic from Maalai Malar gave the film a favourable review. A critic from iFlicks, on the contrary, called the film "watchable".
