= Kulir 100° =

2009 film

- Theatrical release poster
- Directed by: Anita Udeep
- Written by: Anita Udeep
- Produced by: Anita Udeep
- Starring: Sanjeev; Riya Bamniyal
- Cinematography: L. K. Vijay
- Edited by: B. Lenin
- Music by: Bobo Shashi
- Production company: Mayajaal Entertainment
- Release date: 5 June 2009
- Country: India
- Language: Tamil
- Budget: ₹30 million

Kulir 100° (transl. Cold 100°) is a 2009 Indian Tamil-language teen drama film written, directed, and produced by Anita Udeep in her Tamil debut. The film stars Sanjeev and Riya Bamniyal, while Karthik Sabesh, Thalaivasal Vijay, Adithya Menon, Sujatha and Rohit Rathod play supporting roles. The music was composed by first-timer Bobo Shashi with editing by B. Lenin and cinematography by L. K. Vijay. The film was released on 5 June 2009. It is an unofficial adaptation of the Swedish film Evil (2003).

== Plot ==
Surya is the son of a gangster and studies at a school in Chengalpattu. His mother, who is separated from her husband, wants Surya to grow up as a model citizen. However, he is violent like his father and gets expelled for beating up a teacher. Surya, who is attached to his mother, promises her that he will not take the path of violence again and joins the Lake View School in a hill station. Surya is looked down upon by his snooty seniors led by school bully Rohit and his gang. The only people who stand with Surya are Babloo and Tanya, the principal Yeshwanth Raj's daughter who has a soft corner for him. Under extreme provocation, Surya keeps his cool as he tries to live up to his mother's expectations. However, he relapses after Babloo is murdered and goes on a revenge spree. After achieving his revenge, Surya returns home but learns from his father that his mother died in a road accident.

== Cast ==
- Sanjeev as Surya
- Riya Bamniyal as Tanya
- Karthik Sabesh as Babloo
- Nitish Krishna
- N. Nuhman Syed
- Abhishek K. S.
- Adithya Menon as Surya's father
- Sujatha as Surya's mother
- Thalaivasal Vijay as Yeshwanth Raj
- Rohit Rathod as Rohit (uncredited)

== Production ==
Kulir 100° is the first Tamil film directed by Anita Udeep. According to her, the title "indicates it's both cold and hot which means that opposites attract, the basic framework of the film". She spent almost a year on screen testing potential actors before finalising Sanjeev Karthick and Riya Bamniyal as the lead actors. Karthik Sabesh, who plays Sanjeev's friend, was the son of Sabesh of the Sabesh–Murali musical duo and was recommended to the director by them. Bamniyal, previously an advertisement model, made her feature film debut. A non-Tamil speaker, she tried learning the language for playing her role. Sanjeev, then a dance choreographer, was cast after Anita saw him on a reality series. The film was made on a budget of ₹30 million (US$310,000). It was shot in locations including Switzerland, Kullu, Manali, Yercaud, Ooty, and London. While the story takes place primarily in a hill station, Anita intentionally left the place unnamed, calling it her "own dream land". The film includes a kissing scene between the lead actors, resulting in the censor board giving it a U/A certificate.

== Soundtrack ==
The music was composed by Bobo Shashi in his debut film. The songs "Hip Hop Hurray" and "Manasellam" attained popularity. Karthik Srinivasan of Milliblog wrote, "Given Bobo Shashi's background (being Murali's – of Sabesh Murali fame – son!...Deva's clan!), the predominant hip-hop and rap mix is surprising. Sounding like the B-grade version of Dharan doesn't help, though".

Track listing
No.	Title	Lyrics	Singer(s)	Length
1.	"Boom"	Pa. Vijay	Benny Dayal, Abishek, Bobo Shashi, Nritya	04:22
2.	"Hip Hop Hurray"	Boomerang X	Coco Nanda, MC Bullet	03:15
3.	"Manasellam" (Unplugged)	V. Ilango	Silambarasan	03:50
4.	"Siragindri Parakkalam"	Purple Patch	Geetha, Rekha, Saritha, Archana, Benny Dayal, Swami, Lil-J, Bobo Shashi	03:47
5.	"Un Uyir Nanban"	Thug Laws	Krish	02:22
6.	"Nallavan Kettavan"	Boomerang X	Coco Nanda & MC Bullet	02:45
7.	"Manasellam"	V. Ilango	Ranjith	04:36
Total length:				24:57

== Critical reception ==
Sify said, "The film lacks the magic one associate with boarding school brat pack movie. Let us hope Anita Udeep, learns from her mistakes and finds a better script in her next outing." Pavithra Srinivasan of Rediff.com said, "Kulir 100 Degrees tries very hard to simulate the lives of youngsters, but it seems to flit to the next scene before any scenario can be fully explored, leaving you with a sense of dissatisfaction. In the end, the result is rather half-baked. The cool visuals and neat songs are the only compensation" and rated the film two out of five stars. IANS wrote, "While the visuals are okay and backed by an average musical score, the underdeveloped characters sink the film irretrievably".

Malathi Rangarajan of The Hindu reviewed the film more positively, appreciating the story and screenplay, and lauded the director for "balanc[ing] the plausible and the commercial with élan". Chennai Online wrote, "The director has started off the movie well but looses [sic] track, as she takes the movie to a different plane, which is more of a deviation than a development. The major problem of the movie is its lack of focus and non-happening screenplay". The New Indian Express wrote, "Fairly engaging and targeted at the urban teens, Kulir… has a western sensibility and scores on elegance and style. Some more pep and zest, and a better conviction in its scripting and story telling, would have worked to the film's advantage".
