= Vinnaithaandi Varuvaayaa (soundtrack) =

Soundtrack album by A. R. Rahman
- Released: 6 January 2010
- Recorded: 2009–2010
- Studios: Panchathan Record Inn and AM Studios, Chennai
- Genre: Feature film soundtrack
- Length: 69:02
- Language: Tamil
- Label: Sony Music India
- Producer: A. R. Rahman

A. R. Rahman chronology
Couples Retreat (2009)	Vinnaithaandi Varuvaayaa (2010)	Ye Maaya Chesave (2010)

Vinnaithaandi Varuvaayaa is the soundtrack of the 2010 Tamil romance film of the same name, directed by Gautham Vasudev Menon. The soundtrack album and background score were composed by A. R. Rahman, collaborating with Menon for the first time. The lyrics for the songs were penned by Menon's usual associate, Thamarai along with Kalyani Menon and Kaithapram, the latter penning the Malayalam lyrics in the album. The album was released on 25 December 2009 in London with several film personalities participating at the grand function. It was the first time that a Tamil film audio release was held in London. It was followed by an audio launch function which was also held in Chennai on 6 January 2010. Sony Music India released the album. The album opened to positive reviews from music critics. The audio was marked as #1 in Asia, in terms of advance bookings. The album was ranked among the best musicals of 2010. A collector's edition of the film was released on 1 December 2010, which featured two unreleased tracks. The same soundtrack album was reused in the simultaneous Telugu version Ye Maaya Chesave (2010) and its Hindi remake Ekk Deewana Tha (2012).

== Release ==
=== Unofficial versions ===
Before the official audio release, the track "Hosanna" was leaked and went viral on the internet. Later the track was officially released with the same singer but another strophe had been added to the song.

=== Official version ===
The official audio of Vinnaithaandi Varuvaayaa was released at the BAFTA Awards held at London on 25 December 2009, which was attended by several film personalities, including the lead actors Silambarasan and Trisha, composer A. R. Rahman, lyricist Thamarai, director Gautham Vasudev Menon amongst others attending the event, which also featured a live unplugged performance. On 6 January 2010, another audio release function was held at Sathyam cinemas in Chennai with several film personalities participating in the grand function, amongst the cast and crew, after which the original audio cassettes and CDs were available in stores. Three songs and a trailer was screened at the event. The audio was released by Kamal Haasan, who has previously acted in Gautham's direction in the film Vettaiyaadu Vilaiyaadu (2006). The CD's & cassettes cover released by Sony Music India had an image of three Silambarasan's and on the right side a Trisha. All the lyrics are penned by Menon's usual associate, Thamarai and the Malayalam lyrics by Kaithapram and Kalyani Menon.

As a part of the film's promotion, the audio cassettes and CDs were released across the world via Amazon's online retail store, and also made available digitally on iTunes, Nokia Store, and an iPhone application, in which will allow the users to stream and listen to the full-length songs from the film, download the songs, wallpapers and other movie related information. This initiative is a first for an iPhone application that is entirely based on movie OST. It is the result of the joint efforts by Sony Music Entertainment India and Dot Com Infoway Mobile Studios, a Chennai-based Software and Mobile applications developer. The service will be available to any registered user of iPhone apps across the world, where a user will be charged $1.99 (₹139 in terms of INR) for downloading the application facilitating unlimited streaming of the songs from the album and $2.99 (₹213 in terms of INR) to download the whole album. The software company has also made sure to restrict unauthorized sharing of the content through this unique application, where a user who downloads the songs on his iPhone or iPod will not be able transfer it to any other unauthorized device.

=== Collector's edition ===
A collector's edition special pack, titled A. R. Rahman Collectors' Edition Pack of Vinnaithaandi Varuvaayaa, was released by Sony Music on 1 December 2010. This edition included two additional songs, BAFTA audio premiere, A. R. Rahman T-shirt and liner notes of the songs. The additional songs, a female version of "Aaromale" and "Jessie's Land" were performed by Shreya Ghoshal and Megha respectively, at the audio premiere held at BAFTA Awards in London on 11 December 2010.

== Other versions ==
=== Telugu version ===
The same soundtrack was also used in the Telugu version of the film, Ye Maaya Chesave, which was simultaneously made and released with the Tamil version. The Telugu version of the soundtrack was released on 3 February 2010. It also had the same set of vocalists except for Rahman, who was replaced by Karthik for the Telugu version of "Mannipaaya" which was titled Vintunaava. The lyrics were penned by Anantha Sreeram.

=== Hindi version ===
The same soundtrack was also used for the Hindi remake, titled Ekk Deewana Tha which is also directed by Gautham Menon. The soundtrack was released on 23 December 2011.

== Tamil ==
The tracklist was released by A. R. Rahman's official website on 16 December 2009.

All lyrics are written by Thamarai, except where noted.

No.	Title	Singer(s)	Length
1.	"Omana Penne" (Malayalam lyrics: Kalyani Menon)	Benny Dayal, Kalyani Menon	5:44
2.	"Anbil Avan"	Chinmayi, Devan Ekambaram	3:57
3.	"Vinnaithaandi Varuvaayaa"	Karthik, Vivek Aggarwal	3:12
4.	"Hosanna" (Rap lyrics: Blaaze)	Blaaze, Suzanne, Vijay Prakash	5:30
5.	"Kannukkul Kannai"	Naresh Iyer	3:52
6.	"Mannipaaya"	A. R. Rahman, Shreya Ghoshal	6:36
7.	"Aaromale" (Lyrics: Kaithapram)	Alphons Joseph	5:46

Vinnaithaandi Varuvaayaa (Collector's Edition)
No.	Title	Singer(s)	Length
8.	"Aaromale – Female Version"	Shreya Ghoshal	4:33
9.	"Jessie's Land"	Megha	1:58

== Reception ==
Professional ratings
Review scores
Source	Rating
IndiaGlitz	4/5 stars
Rediff.com	3/5 stars
Behindwoods	3.5/5 stars
Music Aloud	8.5/10 stars
Radioandmusic.com	3.5/5 stars

The album received positive reviews from music critics. Indiaglitz gave the album 4 out of 5 stating "Vinnaithandi Varuvaya is a cute little album that has experimental score by Rahman. The man with Midas Touch, Rahman is at again. The album is a rich treasure not just for Rahman-fans but to genuine music-lovers too. The music composer seems to have set a trend which others would soon emulate." Behindwoods rated the album 3.5 out of 5 stating "In a rather telling interview with Nik Gowing of BBC, Rahman expressed his deep desire to bring South Indian (he sweetly included all the four states) music out of its narrow confines and popularize it all over the world because it had so much to offer. He has taken a huge step in that direction with this album. Though the music sounds global, it has some tasteful native sensibilities." Rediff rated the album 3 out of 5 stating "It isn't possible to toss an opinion of an A R Rahman album based on just one listen. This composer has a talent for coming up with numbers that grow on you. Lyricist Thamarai stands out, as well. Having said that, it doesn't look like VTV is one of her best efforts. Blame the post-Oscar hype or the burden of too many projects but aside from a few moments of brilliant heights, ARR pretty much sticks to his proven template. In this collection, he's gone more for the western crowd, it seems and there's little space for experimentation. A discerning music-lover might be left yearning for something more. For diehard ARR fans though, it's a musical treat." Music Aloud gave the rating of 8.5 out of 10 stating "To sum up, it is refreshing to hear a set of totally new tunes from a Gautam Menon flick. Rahman has started off his 2010 campaign in style. And in Aaromale, he has once again shown why he is a league apart from other music directors of his time." Milliblog reviewed "Gautam’s fish-out-of-bowl state shows as he grapples with Rahman’s divergently different melodic palette." Radioandmusic.com gave the album 3.5 out of 5 and reviewed "Experimental in nature, the album Vinnaithandi Varuvaya exudes freshness. My pick in the album includes Hossana which would go well with the audiences, Alphonse Joseph owes Rahman for beautiful composition- Aaoromale and Mannipaya."

== Accolades ==
Award	Category	Recipient(s)	Result
BIG Tamil Entertainment Awards	Most Entertaining Male Singer	Vijay Prakash for "Hosanna"	Won
Edison Awards	Best Male Singer	Vijay Prakash for "Hosanna"	Won
Filmfare Awards South	Best Music Director	A. R. Rahman	Won
Filmfare Awards South	Best Lyricist	Thamarai for "Mannipaaya"	Won
Filmfare Awards South	Best Male Playback	Vijay Prakash for "Hosanna"	Nominated
Vijay Awards	Best Music Director	A. R. Rahman	Won
Vijay Awards	Best Female Playback Singer	Shreya Ghoshal for "Mannipaaya"	Won
Vijay Awards	Best Male Playback Singer	Vijay Prakash for "Hosanna"	Won
Vijay Music Awards	Popular Album of the Year	Vinnaithaandi Varuvaayaa	Won
Vijay Music Awards	Best Music Director	A. R. Rahman	Won
Vijay Music Awards	Best Female Singer	Shreya Ghoshal for "Mannipaaya"	Won
Vijay Music Awards	Best Male Singer	Vijay Prakash for "Hosanna"	Won

== Album credits ==
Credits adapted from A. R. Rahman's official website.

=== Producers ===
A. R. Rahman

=== Songwriters ===
- A. R. Rahman (Composer & Arranger)
- Thamarai (Lyrics)
- Kaithapram (Lyrics, Aaromale)

=== Performers ===
A. R. Rahman, Benny Dayal, Kalyani Menon, Devan Ekambaram, Chinmayi, Karthik, Vijay Prakash, Suzanne, Blaaze, Naresh Iyer, Shreya Ghoshal, Alphons Joseph, Megha

=== Musicians ===
- Nadaswaram - Natarajan
- Guitar - Johny George, Sanjeev Thomas, Keith Peters
- Violin - Ganesh Rajagopalan
- Flute - Naveen Kumar, Kiran
- Cello - Elith Martyn
- Strings - Chennai Strings Orchestra (conducted by V. J. Srinivasamurthy)
- Choir - KM Music Conservatory
- Backing vocals - Blaaze, Suzanne D'Mello, Vivek Agarwal, Dr. Narayanan, V. V. Prasanna, Haricharan Seshadri, Kalyani Menon

=== Personnel ===
- Additional programming and arrangement - T. R. Krishna Chetan, P. A. Deepak, Hentry Kuruvilla, Vivianne Chaix
- Additional vocal supervisor - Srinivas Doraisamy

=== Sound engineers ===
- Panchathan Record Inn, Chennai - P. A. Deepak, T.R. Krishna Chetan, Vivianne Chaix, Suresh Perumal, Kannan Ganpat
- AM Studios, Chennai - Sivakumar S

=== Production ===
- Mixed by - P. A. Deepak, K. J. Singh
- Mastered by - Sivakumar S
- Musicians co-ordinatior - Noel James, T. M. Faizuddin
- Musicians fixer - Samidurai

Music Label - Sony Music Entertainment Pvt. Ltd.
