= Hosanna (A. R. Rahman song) =

"Hosanna/Ee Hridayam"

Song by Anbumani M featuring Sushmitha, Anbumani, Blaaze, Leon

from the album Ekk Deewana Tha, Vinnaithaandi Varuvaayaa and Ye Maaya Chesave
- Released: 6 January 2010
- Recorded: Panchathan Record Inn and AM Studios, Chennai, India
- Genre: Filmi
- Length: 5:30
- Label: Sony Music
- Songwriters: A. R. Rahman (composer), Anantha Sreeram (Telugu lyrics), Thamarai (Tamil lyrics), Javed Akhtar (Hindi lyrics), Blaaze (Rap lyrics)
- Producer: A. R. Rahman

"Hosanna" is a Tamil/Telugu/Hindi song from the 2010 Indian Tamil film Vinnaithaandi Varuvaayaa,Telugu film Ye Maaya Chesave and 2012 Hindi film Ekk Deewana Tha composed by A. R. Rahman, sung by Vijay Prakash and Suzanne D'Mello featuring Tamil lyrics by Thamarai, and the rap portion in all versions by Blaaze. The song features additional vocals by Vivek Agarwal, Dr. Narayan, V. V. Prasanna and Haricharan and chorus by K. M. Music Conservatory. In the 2012 Hindi remake of the film, Ekk Deewana Tha the song was written by Javed Akhtar sung by Leon D'Souza and Maria Roe Vincent and the interlude Hosanna humming by Suzanne D'Mello. The song became very popular in all versions and was #1 in the year end music charts of 2010.

== Controversies ==
Vinnaithaandi Varuvaayaa was one of the most anticipated soundtracks as it was Rahman's first album he composed after his double Oscars win. Following this anticipation, the track was leaked on to the internet before the official audio releases. Later the track was officially released with the same singer but another strophe had been added to the song. A thirty-second video of the song was also released later.

In 2012, members of an organization called Catholic Secular Forum (CSF) objected to the song, claiming that "Hosanna" is a sacred word. They demanded removal of the word from the song, and an apology.

== Reception ==
"Hosanna" created waves among the music lovers even before the audio release of the film. It had another grand reception when its video was released onto television channels on 11 March. The song was the most promoted song of the film and it became very popular. The song was #1 in the year end music charts of 2010, published by Sify.

== See also ==
- Vinnaithaandi Varuvaayaa
- Vinnaithaandi Varuvaayaa (soundtrack)
- Ye Maaya Chesave
- Ye Maaya Chesave (soundtrack)
- Aaromale
