= Ye Maaya Chesave (soundtrack) =

Soundtrack album by A. R. Rahman
- Released: 29 January 2010
- Recorded: 2009–2010
- Studios: Panchathan Record Inn and AM Studios, Chennai
- Genre: Feature film soundtrack
- Length: 35:03
- Languages: Telugu; Malayalam; English
- Label: Sony Music
- Producer: A. R. Rahman

A. R. Rahman chronology
Vinnaithaandi Varuvaayaa (2010)	Ye Maaya Chesave (2010)	Raavan (2011)

Ye Maaya Chesave is the soundtrack album of the 2010 Telugu romantic drama film of the same name, directed by Gautham Vasudev Menon. The original score and songs were composed by A. R. Rahman; lyrics are penned by Anantha Sreeram, along with Kalyani Menon and Kaithapram, the latter penning the Malayalam lyrics in the album. This is the sixth time that A. R. Rahman composed music for a direct Telugu film and the fourth time that he composed the entire soundtrack for a Telugu film. This also marked Rahman's comeback into Telugu cinema after six years.

The album was released on 29 January 2010 through Sony Music. The same tunes of the Tamil version (Vinnaithaandi Varuvaayaa) were retained in the Telugu version and the Hindi remake (Ekk Deewana Tha) of the film. The album was met with many extremely positive responses and received high critical acclaim. The album was ranked among the best musicals of 2010 and 2011 in Asia and was also the most successful soundtrack album in India, mainly Andhra Pradesh. Ye Maaya Chesave is one of Rahman's most successful soundtracks and is his most successful Telugu album; with it, he won his first Filmfare Award in Telugu. The melodious background score also received overwhelming positive critical reception. The soundtrack album and background score were also nominated for various other awards.

== Album information ==
Professional ratings
Review scores
Source	Rating
Raaga	9.5/10 stars
IndiaGlitz	4/5 stars
Dhingana	5/5 stars
MusicAloud	8.5/10 stars

The first song in the album is "Kundanapu Bomma", sung by Benny Dayal and Kalyani Menon, that features Naga Chaitanya and Samantha Ruth Prabhu. It replaced Omana Penne from the movie "Vinnaithaandi Varuvaaya. It is placed when the duo travel to Kerala and the male character dreams about romance. This song was highly praised by critics, and it marks Benny Dayal's first original song in Telugu.

The second song in the album, entitled, "Manasaa", is sung by Chinmayi and Devan Ekambaram. The song was picturised in New York City. it The third song is "Vintunnava", sung by Shreya Ghoshal and Karthik; it was pictured in Hyderabad. This song was also highly praised by critics and received extremely positive responses. "Vintunnava" was ranked No. 1 in the top five Telugu songs of 2010. Shreya Ghoshal's rendering of the song was highly appreciated.

The fourth song in the album is "Ee Hrudayam" and is sung by Vijay Prakash, Suzanne D'Mello and Blaaze, which already made huge waves before the official audio release, and was regarded as the highlight of the album by many reviewers. This song was ranked No. 3 in the top five Telugu songs of 2010. The song is widely regarded as the biggest Telugu song in Vijay Prakash's singing career. As a result, Vijay Prakash was nominated for Best Male Playback category in the Filmfare awards, but lost to Ramesh Vinayagam and N. C. Karunya.

The fifth song is titled "Swaasye". The voice was also rendered by Karthik. This song also received positive reviews from critics. It was used as a background track in the film. The sixth song is named "Aakaasam", a peppy number sung by Naresh Iyer. The final song in the album is entitled, "Aaromale", and is sung by the Malayalam music director Alphons Joseph. Gautham Menon worked with Rahman again in his next project Ekk Deewana Tha (remake of Ye Maaya Chesave), after the success of the soundtrack.

== Other versions ==
=== Tamil version ===
The same soundtrack was also used in the Tamil version of the film, Vinnaithaandi Varuvaaya, which was simultaneously made and released with the Telugu version. However, The Tamil version of the soundtrack was released at first on 25 December 2009 in London, and 6 January 2010 in Chennai. It also had the same set of vocalists except for Karthik, who was replaced by A. R. Rahman for the Tamil version of "Vintunnaava" which was titled Mannipaaya. The lyrics were penned by Menon's usual associate, Thamarai. The Tamil version of the album garnered mostly positive reviews.

=== Hindi version ===
The same soundtrack has been used for the Hindi remake, titled Ekk Deewana Tha which is also directed by Gautham Menon. The soundtrack was released on 21 December 2011. The Hindi version received generally positive reviews and was appreciated as well.

== Track listing ==
The track list was revealed on 20 January 2010 on A. R. Rahman's official website.

All tracks are written by Anantha Sreeram.

Ye Maaya Chesave (Original Motion Picture Soundtrack)
No.	Title	Lyrics	Artist(s)	Length
1.	"Aaromale"	Kaithapram	Alphons Joseph	5:46
2.	"Aakaasam"	Anantha Sreeram	Naresh Iyer	3:53
3.	"Swaasye"	Anantha Sreeram	Karthik	3:13
4.	"Ee Hrudayam" (English Rap lyrics: Blaaze)	Anantha Sreeram	Vijay Prakash, Suzanne D'Mello, Blaaze	5:32
5.	"Kundanapu Bomma" (Malayalam lyrics: Kalyani Menon)	Anantha Sreeram	Benny Dayal, Kalyani Menon	5:40
6.	"Vintunnaava"	Anantha Sreeram	Karthik, Shreya Ghoshal	6:58
7.	"Manasaa"	Anantha Sreeram	Chinmayi, Devan Ekambaram	4:12

Ye Maaya Chesave (Collector's Edition)
No.	Title	Artist(s)	Length
8.	"Broken Promises"	Shreya Ghoshal	4:33
9.	"Jessy's Land"	Megha	1:58
10.	"Moments in Kerala"	A. R. Rahman (Instrumental)	2:42

== Accolades ==
Award	Category	Recipient(s)	Song(s)	Result
Filmfare Awards	Best Music Director	A. R. Rahman		Won
Filmfare Awards	Best Lyricist	Anantha Sreeram	"Vintunnava"	Nominated
Filmfare Awards	Best Male Playback	Vijay Prakash	"Ee Hrudayam (Hosanna)"	Nominated
South Scope Awards	Best Album	Ye Maaya Chesave		Won
South Scope Awards	Best Album (Listener's Choice)	Ye Maaya Chesave		Won
South Scope Awards	Best Music Director	A. R. Rahman		Nominated
South Scope Awards	Best Background Score	A. R. Rahman		Won
South Scope Awards	Best Song	A. R. Rahman	"Ee Hrudayam"	Nominated
South Scope Awards	Best Male Playback	Vijay Prakash	"Ee Hrudayam"	Won
South Scope Awards	Best Female Playback	Shreya Ghoshal	"Vintunnava"	Won
South Scope Awards	Best Lyricist	Anantha Sreeram	"Vintunnava"	Won
South Scope Awards	Best Upcoming Vocalist	Benny Dayal	"Kundanapu Bomma"	Won
CineMAA Awards	Best Music Director	A. R. Rahman		Won
CineMAA Awards	Best Female Playback	Shreya Ghoshal	"Vintunnava"	Nominated
CineMAA Awards	Best Male Playback	Vijay Prakash	"Ee Hrudayam"	Nominated
CineMAA Awards	Best Lyricist	Anantha Sreeram	"Vintunnava"	Nominated
Mirchi Music Awards	Best Male Playback	Alphons Joseph	"Aaromale"	Nominated
TSR-TV9 Film Awards	Best Background Score	A. R. Rahman		Won
BIG FM Music Awards	Best Female Playback	Shreya Ghoshal	"Vintunnava"	Nominated
BIG FM Music Awards	Best Male Playback	Vijay Prakash	"Ee Hrudayam"	Nominated
BIG FM Music Awards	Best Song	A. R. Rahman	"Vintunnava"	Nominated
BIG FM Music Awards	Best Song	A. R. Rahman	"Kundanapu Bomma"	Nominated
MAA Music Awards	Best Male Playback	Benny Dayal	"Kundanapu Bomma"	Nominated
MAA Music Awards	Best Male Playback	Vijay Prakash	"Ee Hrudayam"	Won
MAA Music Awards	Best Female Playback	Shreya Ghoshal	"Vintunnava"	Won
MAA Music Awards	Best Song	A. R. Rahman	"Vintunnava"	Won
Nokia BIG Ugadi Music Awards	Best Female Playback	Shreya Ghoshal	"Vintunnava"	Nominated
Nokia BIG Ugadi Music Awards	Best Male Playback	Vijay Prakash	"Ee Hrudayam"	Nominated
Nokia BIG Ugadi Music Awards	Best Upcoming Lyricist	Anantha Sreeram		Won
Nokia BIG Ugadi Music Awards	Best Lyricist	Anantha Sreeram	"Vintunnava"	Nominated
Nokia BIG Ugadi Music Awards	Best Song	A. R. Rahman	"Vintunnava"	Nominated
Nokia BIG Ugadi Music Awards	Best Song	A. R. Rahman	"Kundanapu Bomma"	Won
Nokia BIG Ugadi Music Awards	Best Album	Ye Maaya Chesave		Nominated
Nokia BIG Ugadi Music Awards	Best Heart Touching Song	A. R. Rahman	"Vintunnava"	Nominated
Nokia BIG Ugadi Music Awards	Best Love Hit	A. R. Rahman	"Swaasye"	Nominated
Nokia BIG Ugadi Music Awards	Best Happy Hit	A. R. Rahman	"Ee Hrudayam"	Nominated
