= Aaromale =

Song by A. R. Rahman (Composer) & Alphonse (Singer)

from the album Ekk Deewana Tha (soundtrack), Vinnaithaandi Varuvaayaa (soundtrack) and Ye Maaya Chesave (soundtrack)
- Released: 6 January 2010 (original version); 1 December 2010 (female version); 21 December 2011 (hindi version)
- Recorded: 2009; Panchathan Record Inn and AM Studios, Chennai, India
- Length: 5:46
- Label: Sony Music
- Songwriters: A.R. Rahman; Kaithapram

"Aaromale" (transl. O Beloved) is a song from the 2010 Tamil film Vinnaithaandi Varuvaayaa and Telugu film Ye Maaya Chesave composed by A. R. Rahman, featuring lyrics by Kaithapram and the word Aaromale frequently used in the 2012 Hindi version of the song in the film Ekk Deewana Tha with lyrics by Javed Akhtar. The song is sung by Malayalam composer Alphons Joseph. The song was well received upon release and was a chart topper.

== Background ==
A. R. Rahman was asked to score only six songs for the soundtrack, but later he suggested including a song with Malayalam lyrics that was apt for the script. He himself suggested lyricist Kaithapram and the singer Alphons with whom he made an acquaintance during the audio launch of Alphons' debut album Vellithira.

== About the song ==
The chorus portion is based on the Hindustani raga Bageshri. Penned by Kaithapram, the song is high in instrumentation and quick changing rhythms. The song starts slow but goes on to pick speed slightly. The song has guitar scores that give the feel of country music. The rendition of Alphonse got high appreciations from fans and critics and Rahman invited him to participate in his world tour.

== Female version ==
A female version of the song, sung by Shreya Ghoshal, was released on 1 December 2010. This track was released as part of the collector's edition of the soundtrack, titled A. R. Rahman Collectors' Edition Pack of Vinnaithaandi Varuvaayaa. Shreya Ghoshal had also performed the song when it was used in the background score of the film.
