= Naresh Iyer =

Indian playback singer (born 1981)

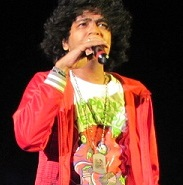

Background information
- Born: 3 January 1981 (age 45); Mumbai, Maharashtra, India
- Years active: 2005 – present

Naresh Iyer (born 3 January 1981), known mononymously as Naresh, is an Indian playback singer. Born in Mumbai, Iyer is fluent in Tamil, Hindi and Marathi. Although his actual hometown was rumoured to be in Vadalur, Neyveli. Naresh Iyer has rendered 2000 film songs in several Indian languages and has several chart hits to his credit. His rendition of "Roobaroo" from the movie Rang De Basanti composed by A. R. Rahman topped the music charts for many weeks in 2006 and won him the National Film Award for Best Male Playback Singer. He won the Filmfare award in the R.D. Burman Musical Talent category.

== Early life ==
Naresh Iyer was born to a Tamil family Shankar Iyer and Radha on 3 January 1981 and brought up in Matunga, Mumbai. He has a younger sister named Nisha Iyer, who is an upcoming self-taught Professional Artist. He attended SIES College of Commerce and Economics where he received his Degree in Commerce. After graduation he intended to become a Chartered Accountant and was practicing CA and side by side was learning Carnatic music and Hindustani classical music too.

== Career ==
Naresh was spotted by composer A. R. Rahman in a reality talent show, Channel V's Super Singer. Though he did not win the show, Naresh was later contacted by A. R. Rahman and made his debut with the song "Mayilirage" from Anbe Aaruyire. He has also sung for other composers in Tamil, Telugu, Hindi and Malayalam.

Naresh is also the vocalist of a Mumbai based fusion band called Dhvani.

He also won the R.D. Burman Award as the best male upcoming singer.

The same year he also won the National Award for Best Playback Singer(Male) for his rendition of "Rubaroo" from the movie "Rang De Basanti".

== Awards ==
- 2006 – National Film Award for Best Male Playback Singer for the song "Roobaroo" from Rang De Basanti
- 2007 – Filmfare RD Burman Award for New Music Talent – Rang De Basanti
- 2007 - Nominated for IIFA Award for "Roobaroo" from Rang De Basanti along with A. R. Rahman
- 2007 – Filmfare Award for Best Male Playback Singer – Tamil for the song "Mundhinam Parthenae" from Vaaranam Aayiram
- 2006 – Filmfare RD Burman Award for New Music Talent
- 2005 – Hub Award for Best Playback Singer for the song "Mayilarage" from Anbe Aaruyire
- 2006 – Kannadasan Award for Best Male Debut
- 2008 – Hub Award for Best Playback Singer for the song "Mundhinam Parthenae" from Vaaranam Aayiram
- 2010 – South Scope Award for Best Male Playback singer for the song "Oru Vetkam Varudhe" from Pasanga
- 2011 – Mirchi Music Award for Best Male Playback Singer for the song "Nenu Nuvantu" from Orange
- 2016 – Malaysian Indian Cine Award for Best Male Singer for the song "Aatham Enakkenave" from Muthukumar Wanted

== Partial discography ==
=== Hindi songs ===
Year	Film	Song name	Composer	Co-singer(s)
2006	Rang De Basanti	"Masti Ki Paathshaala"	A. R. Rahman	Mahalakshmi Iyer, Mohammed Aslam, Anweshaa, Udit Narayan, Palak Muchhal, Pankaj Udhas, Shamshad Begum, Sapna Mukherjee
2006	Rang De Basanti	"Tu Bin Bataayein"	A. R. Rahman	Madhushree
2006	Rang De Basanti	"Paathshaala (Be A Rebel)"	A. R. Rahman	Mohammed Aslam, Blaaze
2006	Rang De Basanti	"Roobaroo"	A. R. Rahman	A. R. Rahman
2007	Sivaji (D)	"The Boss"	A. R. Rahman	Blaaze, Raqeeb Alam
2008	Jaane Tu... Ya Jaane Na	"Nazrein Milana Nazrein Churana"	A. R. Rahman	Benny Dayal, Satish Subrahmaniam, Darshana KT, Shweta Mohan, Tanvi Shah, Sayanora Philip, Bhargavi, Anupama
2008	Ada... A Way of Life	"Tu Mera Hai"	A. R. Rahman	K. S. Chithra, Sukhwinder Singh
2008	Yuvvraaj	"Mastam Mastam"	A. R. Rahman	Sonu Nigam, Alka Yagnik, Benny Dayal
2008	Yuvvraaj	"Dil Ka Rishta"	A. R. Rahman	Sonu Nigam, Roop Kumar Rathod, A. R. Rahman, Clinton Cerejo, Suzanne D'Mello, Vivienne Pocha, Sunaina, Benny Dayal, Blaaze
2009	Delhi-6	"Hey Kaala Bandar"	A. R. Rahman	Karthik, Srinivas, Bonnie Chakraborty, Ember
2010	Robot (D)	"Arima Arima"	A. R. Rahman	Hariharan, Sadhana Sargam, Benny Dayal
2010	Dil Toh Baccha Hai Ji	"Tere Bin (Reprise)"	Pritam	
2011	Ekk Deewana Tha	"Dost Hai (Girl I Loved You)"	A. R. Rahman	Jaspreet Jasz, Arya
2011	Force	"Main Chali"	Harris Jayaraj	Shreya Ghoshal

=== Tamil songs ===
Year	Film	Song name	Composer	Co-singer(s)
2005	Anbe Aaruyire (Ah Aah)	"Mayilirage"	A. R. Rahman	Madhushree
2005	Anbe Aaruyire (Ah Aah)	"Anbe Aaruyire" (chorus)	A. R. Rahman	Madhushree
2005	Saravana	"Kadhal Suthudhe"	Srikanth Deva	Sadhana Sargam
2006	Varalaru	"Innisai"	A. R. Rahman	Mahathi, Saindhavi
2006	Varalaru	"Kamma Karaiyile"	A. R. Rahman	Sowmya Raoh
2006	Sillunu Oru Kaadhal	"Munbe Vaa En Anbe Vaa"	A. R. Rahman	Shreya Ghoshal
2006	Sillunu Oru Kaadhal	"Kummi Adi"	A. R. Rahman	Sirkazhi G. Sivachidambaram, Swarnalatha, Theni Kunjarammal, Vignesh
2006	Rendu	"Nee En Thozhiya"	D. Imman	Sujatha Mohan
2006	Imsai Arasan 23rd Pulikecei	"Aasai Kanave"	Sabesh-Murali	Kalyani
2006	Chennai Kadhal	"Sili Silukum Silmishi"	Joshua Sridhar	Kalpana
2007	Pachaikili Muthucharam	"Kadhal Konjam"	Harris Jayaraj	
2007	Pachaikili Muthucharam	"Karu Karu Vizhigalaal"	Harris Jayaraj	Karthik, Krish
2007	Azhagiya Thamizh Magan	"Valayapatti Thavile"	A. R. Rahman	Ujjayinee, Srimathumitha
2007	Naan Avanillai	"Thaen Kudicha"	Vijay Antony	Deepa Miriam
2007	Thoovanam	"SMS Ile"	Isaac Thomas Kottukapally	Mahathi, Satyan
2007	Vambu Sandai	"Thaal Thiravai"	D. Imman	
2007	Ninaithaley	"Illayaraja AR Rahman"	Vijay Antony	
2007	Lee	"Oru Kalavani Payale"	D. Imman	Madhushree
2007	Thirumagan	"Idhukuthana"	Deva	Madhushree
2007	Thirumagan	"Thatti Thatti"	Deva	Madhushree
2007	Sivaji: The Boss	"The Boss"	A. R. Rahman	Blaaze, Raqeeb Alam
2008	Velli Thirai	"Uyirile"	G. V. Prakash Kumar	
2008	Bheema	"Oru Mugamo"	Harris Jayaraj	Krish
2008	Vaaranam Aayiram	"Mundhinam Parthene"	Harris Jayaraj	Prashanthini
2008	Vaaranam Aayiram	"Yethi Yethi"	Harris Jayaraj	Benny Dayal, Solar Sai
2008	Sakkarakatti	"Elay"	A. R. Rahman	Krish
2008	Aegan	"Hey Salaa"	Yuvan Shankar Raja	Blaaze, Mohammed Aslam
2008	Seval	"Paarvayile Oru Yekkam"	G. V. Prakash Kumar	
2008	Thotta	"Mugam Poo"	Srikanth Deva	Chinmayi
2008	Newtonin Moondram Vidhi	"Paraparakura"	F. S Faizal	Srilekha Parthasarathy
2008	Ananda Thandavam	"Pattu Poochi"	G. V Prakash Kumar	
2008	Inbaa	"En Vizhigal Meedhu"	P. B. Balaji	Shreya Ghoshal
2009	Pasanga	"Oru Vetkam Varudhe"	James Vasanthan	Shreya Ghoshal
2009	Angadi Theru	"Un Perai Sollum"	G. V. Prakash Kumar	Shreya Ghoshal, Haricharan
2009	Eesa	"Unnalathan Naanum Vazhuven"	Haran	Prashanthini
2009	Kandhakottai	"Unnai Kadhali Endru Sollava"	Dhina	Sadhana Sargam
2009	Muthirai	"Azhagana Neeyum"	Yuvan Shankar Raja	Manjari Phadnis
2010	Vinnaithaandi Varuvaayaa	"Kannukkul Kannai"	A. R. Rahman	
2010	Semmozhiyaana Thamizh Mozhiyaam	"Semmozhiyaana Thamizh Mozhiyaam"	A. R. Rahman	Various
2010	Bale Pandiya	"Sirikiren"	Devan Ekambaram	Various
2010	Bale Pandiya	"Happy"	Devan Ekambaram	Various
2010	Bale Pandiya	"Bale Pandiya"	Devan Ekambaram	Velmurugan, Ranjith
2010	Uthamaputhiran	"Kan Irandil"	Vijay Antony	
2010	Mynaa	"Kaiya Pudi"	D. Imman	Sadhana Sargam
2010	Enthiran	"Arima Arima"	A. R. Rahman	Hariharan, Sadhana Sargam, Benny Dayal
2010	Inidhu Inidhu	"Kodi Kanavu"	Mickey J. Meyer	
2010	Agam Puram	"Kangal Modhi"	Sundar C. Babu	Vichitra
2010	Engeyum Kadhal	"Thee Illai"	Harris Jayaraj	Mukesh Mohamed, Gopal Rao, Mahathi, Ranina Reddy
2010	Thambikottai	"Noorandu Vazhga"	D. Imman	Anitha, Ilavenil
2011	Ko	"Netri Pottil"	Harris Jayaraj	
2011	Ra.One	"Ulagam Ulagam"	Vishal–Shekhar	
2011	Veppam	"Mazhai Varum" (male)	Joshua Sridhar	
2011	Veppam	"Veppam"	Joshua Sridhar	Joshua Sridhar
2011	Ambuli	"3D Era"	Venkat Prabu Shankar	Blaaze
2011	Vedi	"Kadhalikka"	Vijay Antony	Emcee Jesz, Andrea Jeremiah
2011	Muran	"Idhuvarai"	Sajjan Madhav	Saindhavi
2011	7 Aum Arivu	"Innum Enna Thozha"	Harris Jayaraj	Balram, Suchith Suresan
2011	Mayakkam Enna	"Naan Sonnadhum Mazhai Vanducha"	G. V. Prakash Kumar	Saindhavi
2012	Oru Kal Oru Kannadi	"Venaam Machan"	Harris Jayaraj	Velmurugan
2012	Podaa Podi	"Maattikittenae"	Dharan	Suchitra, Benny Dayal
2012	Sattam Oru Iruttarai	"Adam Evaal"	Vijay Antony	Harini
2012	Samar	"Azhagho Azhaghu"	Yuvan Shankar Raja	
2013	Virattu	"Podhum Podhum"	Dharan	Andrea Jeremiah
2013	Idharkuthane Aasaipattai Balakumara	"Enge Ponalum" (Prayer Song)	Siddharth Vipin	Dr. Narayanan
2013	Ambikapathy (D)	"Ambikapathy"	A. R. Rahman	
2013	Endrendrum Punnagai	"Yaelae Yaelae Dhosthu Da"	Harris Jayaraj	Krish, Krishna Iyer
2013	Kurai Ondrum Illai	"Tholaiviniley"	Ramanujan Mk	Nithya
2015	Charles Shafiq Karthiga	"Mazhai Saaral"	Sidhartha Mohan	Deepika Varadarajan
2016	Gethu	"Thillu Mullu"	Harris Jayaraj	Ranina Reddy
2017	Mersal	"Mersal Arasan"	A. R. Rahman	G. V. Prakash Kumar, Sharanya Srinivas, Viswaprasad
2019	Sagaa	"Yaayum"	Shabir	Rita
2019	Ongala Podanum Sir	"Vennira Irave"	Rejimon	Sanjana Kalmanje
2019	Dev	"Dai Machan Dev"	Harris Jayaraj	Velmurugan, Malavika Manoj, Deepika
2019	Sivappu Manjal Pachai	"Idhuthaan Idhuthaan"	Siddhu Kumar	Shashaa Tirupati
2024	Ayalaan	"Ayalaa Ayalaa"	A. R. Rahman	Hriday Gattani
2024	Then Chennai	"Puthu Vaanam Puthu Bhoomi"	Siva Pathmayan	
2024	Mazaiyil Nanaigiren	"Jolly Thaan Joli"	Vishnu Prasad	
2025	Trauma	"Oru Paarva"	RS Rajprathap	Pooja Vaidyanath
2025	Sumo	"Aazhiye"	Nivas K. Prasanna	Nithyashree Venkatramanan, Hevin Booster, Rose Veronica, Deepti Reddy
2025	Thanal	"Kitta Nerungadha"	Justin Prabhakaran	

=== Telugu songs ===
Year	Film	Songs	Composer	Co-singer
2006	Nuvvu Nenu Prema (D)	"Preminche Premava"	A. R. Rahman	Shreya Ghoshal
2007	Munna	"Manasa"(Audio)	Harris Jayaraj	Sadhana Sargam
2007	Munna	"Manasa"(Film Version)	Harris Jayaraj	Mahalakshmi Iyer
2007	Happy Days	"Happy Days Rock"	Mickey J. Meyer	
2007	One Love	"One Love"	A. R. Rahman	Karthik, A. R. Rahman
2008	Surya S/o Krishnan (D)	"Monna Kanipinchavu"	Harris Jayaraj	Prashanthini
2008	Surya S/o Krishnan (D)	"Yegasi Yegasi"	Harris Jayaraj	Benny Dayal, Chandran
2008	Kotha Bangaru Lokam	"Ok Anesa"	Mickey J. Meyer	Kalyani Nair
2009	Leader	"Aaunana kaadana"	Mickey J. Meyer	Shweta Pandit
2009	Katha	"Thaka Thaka"	S. K. Balachandran	
2009	Blue (D)	"Blue Theme"	A. R. Rahman	Vijay Prakash, Sonu Kakkar, Blaaze, A. R. Reihana, Raqeeb Alam
2009	Blue (D)	"Priyathama"	A. R. Rahman	Shreya Goshal
2010	Ye Maaya Chesave	"Aakaasam"	A. R. Rahman	
2010	Puli	"Amma Thalle"	A. R. Rahman	Shweta Mohan, Rahul Raj
2010	Robo (D)	"Harima Harima"	A. R. Rahman	Hariharan, Sadhana Sargam, Benny Dayal
2010	Orange	"Nenu Nuvvantu"	Harris Jayaraj	Nadeesha, U.V. Jackey
2011	Prema Kaidhi (D)	"Idemiti"	D. Imman	Sadhana Sargam
2011	7th Sense (D)	"Endukanta Joda"	Harris Jayaraj	Suchith Suresan
2011	G.One (D)	"Alano Elano"	Vishal–Shekhar	
2012	Life is Beautiful	"Its your Love"	Mickey J. Meyer	
2012	Routine Love Story	"Yeppatikaina"	Mickey J. Meyer	
2012	Ko Ante Koti	"O Madhurimave"	Shanshikant Kartik	
2012	OKOK (D)	"Vaddura Maavaa"	Harris Jayaraj	Velmurugan
2012	Gajaraju (D)	"Kanne Sogasulu"	D. Imman	
2012	Daruvu	"Nijam Cheppu"	Vijay Antony	Sangeetha Rajeshwaran
2013	Sasesham	"Nuvvaina Nenaina"	K C Mouli	
2014	Karthikeya	"Inthalo Ennenni Vinthalo - Male"	Shekar Chandra	
2014	Aaha Kalyanam	"Honeyae Honeyae - Male"	Dharan Kumar	
2015	Columbus	"Tummeda Jummanipichaku"	Jithin Roshan	Shashaa Tirupati
2015	Superstar Kidnap	"Oh Na Manasa"	Sai Karthik	
2016	Majnu	"Jare Jare"	Gopi Sundar	
2016	Premam	"Agarottula"	Rajesh Murugesan	
2016	Babu Bangaram	"Mallela Vaanala"	Ghibran	
2017	Nenu Local	"Arere Yekkada"	Devi Sri Prasad	Manisha Eerabathini
2017	Kaadhali	"Lokama"	Prasan Praveen Shyam	Sowmya Sharma
2018	Chi La Sow	"Solo Solo"	Prashanth R Vihari	Diwakar, Prashanth R Vihari
2018	Idi Naa Love Story	"Yedho Yedho"	Srinath Vijay	Priya Himesh
2018	Nannu Dochukunduvate	"Inthe Inthena"	B. Ajaneesh Loknath	
2018	Anaganaga O Premakatha	"Nuvvaina Gurthu Cheyyava"	KC Anjan	
2018	Aithe 2.O	"Ningi Pai"	Arun Chiluveru	
2019	Raagala 24 Gantallo	"Aakasanne"	Raghu Kunche	Musskan Sethi
2019	Dear Comrade	"Maama Choodaro"	Justin Prabhakaran	
2020	Amaram Akhilam Prema	"Kanulanu"	Radhan	
2020	Mad	"Nee Thalaputho"	Mohith Rahmanic	Manisha Eerabathini
2021	Sashi	"Yevarikogani"	Arun Chiluveru	Nayana Iyer
2026	Vishnu Vinyasam	"Modhale Modhale"	Radhan	Madhushree

=== Malayalam songs ===
Year	Film	Song name	Composer	Co-singer(s)
2010	Anwar	"Kanninima Neele"	Gopi Sundar	Shreya Ghoshal
2012	Ustad Hotel	"Mel Mel Mel"	Gopi Sundar	Anna Katharina Valayil
2013	Chewing Gum	"En Jeevane"	Jonathan Bruce	Shweta Mohan
2019	Finals	"Nee Mazhavillu Polen"	Kailas Menon	Priya Prakash Varrier

== Television ==
Year	Title	Role	Channel	Note
2025	Super Singer Junior season 10	Guest	Star Vijay	Performed along with Gayathri and Ridhan
