= Ekk Deewana Tha (soundtrack) =

- Original CD Cover

Soundtrack album to Ekk Deewana Tha by A. R. Rahman
- Released: 21 December 2011
- Recorded: Panchathan Record Inn and AM Studios
- Genre: Feature film soundtrack
- Language: Hindi; Malayalam; English
- Label: Sony Music
- Producer: A. R. Rahman

A. R. Rahman chronology
Rockstar (2011)	Ekk Deewana Tha (2011)	Godfather (2012)

Ekk Deewana Tha (transl. There was a Crazy Guy) is the soundtrack album, composed by A. R. Rahman to the 2012 Indian romantic drama film of the same name, written and directed by Gautham Vasudev Menon, featuring Prateik Babbar, Amy Jackson, in her Bollywood debut, and Manu Rishi in the lead roles. This film is a remake of Gautham Menon's own Tamil film, Vinnaithaandi Varuvaayaa or the Telugu film, Ye Maaya Chesave. The soundtrack album was released at Lawns of Taj Khema, eastern gate of The Taj Mahal, Agra, by A. R. Rahman on 21 December 2011.

== Background ==
A. R. Rahman has retained the same tunes from Vinnaithaandi Varuvaayaa and Ye Maaya Chesave. The soundtrack album consists of lyrics penned by Javed Akhtar, collaborating with Gautham Menon for the first time. Javed Akhtar replaced Thamarai from Vinnaithaandi Varuvaayaa and Anantha Sriram from Ye Maaya Chesave. Javed Akhtar had to be in Chennai, to supervise the script and writing the lyrics for the film. A source close to the development said, "Javed saab and Gautham hit it off well. The lyricist's inputs will be taken into consideration as Gautham is particular that his film should not come across as a routine South Indian remake." Clinton Cerejo sings Phoolon Jaisi instead of Omana Penne.

== Release ==
The crew including A. R. Rahman and Javed Akhtar were set to perform live at Mehtab Bagh, which has a stunning backdrop in the Taj Mahal. However, the Archaeological Survey of India (ASI) later denied permission to the crew owing to the damages sustained while shooting for Mere Brother Ki Dulhan was going on at Mehtab Bagh. Then the music album was released at Lawns of Taj Khema, eastern gate of Taj Mahal, which has a good view of the Taj Mahal, on 21 December 2011.

The audio CD hit the stores, all across the country, on 6 January 2012, under the label of Sony Music.

== Track listing ==
All lyrics are written by Javed Akhtar, except where noted.

No.	Title	Artist(s)	Length
1.	"Kya Hai Mohabbat"	A. R. Rahman	4:27
2.	"Dost Hai (Girl I Loved You)"	Naresh Iyer, Jaspreet Jasz & Arya; Additional arrangements: Sachin–Jigar	4:05
3.	"Hosanna"	Leon D'Souza, Suzanne D'Mello, Maria Roe Vincent	5:31
4.	"Sharminda Hoon"	A. R. Rahman & Madhushree	6:56
5.	"Phoolon Jaisi Ladki" (Malayalam lyrics: Kalyani Menon)	Clinton Cerejo & Kalyani Menon	5:37
6.	"Aromale (My Beloved)" (Malayalam lyrics: Kaithapram Namboothiri)	Alphons Joseph	5:41
7.	"Sun Lo Zara"	Rashid Ali, Shreya Ghoshal & Timmy	4:11
8.	"Zohra Jabeen"	Javed Ali	3:13
9.	"Broken Promises" (Instrumental)	Shreya Ghoshal	4:31
10.	"Moments In Kerala" (Instrumental)	Prabhakar	2:40
11.	"Jessie's Land" (Instrumental)	Megha	1:58
12.	"Jessie's Driving Me Crazy" (Bit Song)	Sanjeev Thomas & Timmy	2:55

== Critical reception ==
Professional ratings
Review scores
Source	Rating
Bollywood Hungama	3.5/5 stars

The album received positive reviews from the critics, with praise for the compositions but criticism for its lyrics.

Joginder Tuteja of Bollywood Hungama rated the album 3.5 out of 5 and stated "Ekk Deewana Tha is a very good album and a wholesome musical experience. Except for 'Kya Hai Mohabbat' (which ironically arrives at the very beginning of the album), rest of the album is fantastic and is a must-hear for those who swear by Rahman's score and also those who may not necessarily be bowled over by each and every work of this."
