= Ekk Deewana Tha (disambiguation) =

Ekk Deewana Tha is a 2012 Indian film.

Ekk Deewana Tha or Ek Deewaana Tha may also refer to:

- Ekk Deewana Tha (soundtrack), soundtrack of the film by A. R. Rahman
- Ek Deewaana Tha, a 2017 Indian romantic thriller TV series on Sony TV
