= Blue (2009 film) =

2009 Indian film by Anthony D'Souza

- Theatrical release poster
- Directed by: Anthony D'Souza
- Written by: Story and Screenplay: Anthony D'Souza; Jasmine M. D'Souza; Dialogues: Mayur Puri
- Produced by: Dhilin Mehta
- Starring: Sanjay Dutt; Akshay Kumar; Lara Dutta; Zayed Khan; Rahul Dev
- Cinematography: Laxman Utekar
- Edited by: Shyam Salgaonkar
- Music by: A. R. Rahman
- Production company: Shree Ashtavinayak Cine Vision
- Distributed by: Shree Ashtavinayak Cine Vision
- Release date: 16 October 2009
- Running time: 119 minutes
- Country: India
- Language: Hindi
- Budget: ₹750 million
- Box office: ₹639 million

Blue is a 2009 Indian Hindi-language action film co-written and directed by Anthony D'Souza, and produced by Dhilin Mehta under Shree Astavinayak Cine Vision Limited. The film stars Sanjay Dutt, Akshay Kumar, Lara Dutta, Zayed Khan, and Rahul Dev. Katrina Kaif and Kabir Bedi make cameo appearances. Loosely based on the American film Into the Blue (2005) and its sequel Into the Blue 2: The Reef (2009), it explores a diver, haunted by his past, who must confront it in order to save his younger brother and girlfriend from a gangster, while his employer and good friend coaxes him to recover a lost, sunken treasure which he refuses to.

Blue was released during the Diwali festival on 16 October 2009 and received mixed reviews from critics. During the time of release, it was the most expensive Indian film made until then, produced with a budget of more than $21 million. The music of the film composed by A.R. Rahman.

== Plot ==
The film opens with a ship named Lady in Blue sinking in a storm, with its captain emerging alone on the shore.

In the present day, Aarav runs a fishing company, Blue Fisheries, in the Bahamas, where Sagar works as a diver. Sagar plans to marry his girlfriend Mona. Meanwhile, Sagar's younger brother Sam encounters Nikki, a biker who secretly works for gangster Gulshan in Bangkok. After defeating Gulshan in a bike race, Sam is offered a job, which he accepts for a promised payment of $50,000. However, the situation escalates, leading to a loss of $50 million for Gulshan.

Fearing Gulshan's retaliation, Sam flees to the Bahamas and reunites with Sagar. Gulshan tracks him down, but Aarav intervenes and saves Sam. To settle the debt, Sam proposes retrieving a hidden treasure from the sunken Lady in Blue. Sagar initially refuses due to a traumatic past involving the ship, where he had to abandon his father, Aadesh Singh, to save himself. However, after Gulshan bombs Sagar's house and kidnaps Mona, demanding $50 million as ransom, Sagar agrees to the plan.

Aarav, Sagar, and Sam locate the treasure, but Gulshan and his men intercept them. During the confrontation, it is revealed that Aarav had orchestrated the events by hiring Gulshan to force the group into retrieving the treasure. Aarav kills Gulshan and escapes by diving into the ocean during an approaching storm. Believed to be dead, he is left behind as the others escape.

Three months later, Aarav contacts Sagar and reveals that he survived. He explains that his grandfather, Captain Jagat Malhotra, had commanded the Lady in Blue and was disgraced, motivating Aarav to recover the treasure and restore his family's honour. Nikki is revealed to be alive and is actually Aarav's wife, Nikita Malhotra. The film ends with Aarav and Nikki together, while Sam's response to Nikki remains unresolved.

== Cast ==
- Sanjay Dutt as Sagar "Sethji" Singh
- Akshay Kumar as Aarav Malhotra
- Lara Dutta as Mahima "Mona" Singhania
- Zayed Khan as Sameer "Sam" Singh
- Rahul Dev as Gulshan Samnani
- Katrina Kaif as Nikita "Nikki" Malhotra (cameo appearance)
- Kabir Bedi as Jagat Sudhir Malhotra, Aarav's grandfather (cameo appearance)

== Music ==
Blue

Soundtrack album by A. R. Rahman
- Released: 10 September 2009
- Recorded: Panchathan Record Inn; A.M. Studios
- Genre: Feature film soundtrack
- Length: 50:22
- Label: T-Series
- Producer: A. R. Rahman

A. R. Rahman chronology
Delhi-6 (2009)	Blue (2009)	Couples Retreat (2009)

The music of the film was composed by A. R. Rahman with lyrics provided by Abbas Tyrewala, Mayur Puri, Rajat Arora, Raqeeb Alam and Sukhwinder Singh. The music was promoted and digitally distributed by Hungama Digital Media Entertainment Pvt. Ltd.

The song "Chiggy Wiggy" was sung by pop singer Kylie Minogue and Sonu Nigam. Backing female vocals is given by Suzanne D'Mello and Phij Adams did the sound mixing for the song. Minogue also made a special appearance in the video of the song.

The track "Aaj Dil Gustakh Hai", which begins with a sequence of Sukhwinder Singh's humming, followed by an acoustic guitar loop presents Shreya Ghoshal handling a westernised rendition. The backing vocalists for the song are Benny Dayal, Hentry Kuruvila, Shi Millhouse and Raven Millhouse. "Fiqrana" features vocals by Vijay Prakash and Shreya Ghoshal and was picturised as solo performances of Akshay Kumar, Lara Dutta and Zayed Khan. Sanjay Dutt, the actor playing the film's protagonist boycotted the promotional events since he was not included in this song, which remained chart-topper for many weeks. "Bhoola Tujhe" is a romantic song sung by Rashid Ali. The Yeri voice for the song was by Kavita Belliga. The theme song for Blue was sung by Blaaze, with backing vocals by Raqeeb Alam, Sonu Kakkar, Jaspreet Jasz, Neha Kakkar & Dilshad Khan. "Rehnuma" was sung by Shreya Ghoshal and Sonu Nigam. "Yaar Mila Tha" was sung by Udit Narayan and Madhushree with backing vocals by Ujjayinee Roy, Shi Millhouse and Raven Millhouse. This track was not included in the film, but it is conceptualised as a song played out between the characters of Akshay and Katrina after the end of the film's plot when they talk about Zayed's character.

The official track listing:

Original Hindi tracklist
No.	Title	Lyrics	Singer(s)	Length
1.	"Chiggy Wiggy"	Abbas Tyrewala	Kylie Minogue, Sonu Nigam, Suzanne D'Mello	5:11
2.	"Aaj Dil Gustakh Hai"	Mayur Puri	Sukhwinder Singh, Shreya Ghoshal, Benny Dayal, Shi Millhouse, Henry Kuruvilla, Raven Millhouse	5:29
3.	"Fiqrana"	Rajat Arora	Vijay Prakash, Shreya Ghoshal	5:17
4.	"Bhoola Tujhe"	Abbas Tyrewala	Rashid Ali, Kavita Belliga	5:23
5.	"Blue Theme"	Raqeeb Alam (Hindi/Urdu), Sukhwinder Singh (Punjabi)	Blaaze, Raqeeb Alam, Sonu Kakkar, Jaspreet Jasz, Neha Kakkar, Dilshaad Shaikh	3:55
6.	"Rehnuma"	Abbas Tyrewala	Sonu Nigam, Shreya Ghoshal	3:26
7.	"Yaar Mila Tha"	Abbas Tyrewala	Udit Narayan, Madhushree, Raven Millhouse, Shi Millhouse	4:29
8.	"Aaj Dil Gustakh Hai (Remix by Dj A-Myth)"	Mayur Puri	Sukhwinder Singh, Shreya Ghoshal	5:02
9.	"Fiqrana (Remix by Dj A-Myth)"	Rajat Arora	Vijay Prakash, Shreya Ghoshal	4:46
10.	"Blue Theme (Remix by Dj A-Myth)"	Raqeeb Alam (Hindi/Urdu), Sukhwinder Singh (Punjabi)	Blaaze, Raqeeb Alam, Sonu Kakkar, Jaspreet Jasz, Neha Kakkar, Dilshaad Shaikh	3:25
11.	"Chiggy Wiggy (Remix by Dj A-Myth)"	Abbas Tyrewala	Sonu Nigam, Suzanne D'Mello	3:20

All lyrics are written by Rajasri Sudhakar.

Telugu tracklist
No.	Title	Singer(s)	Length
1.	"Chiggy Wiggy"	Karthik, Sonu Nigam, Kylie Minogue, Suzanne D'Mello	5:11
2.	"Gundey Lo Nippundiley"	Sukhwinder Singh, Shreya Ghoshal, Benny Dayal, Shi Millhouse, Henry Kuruvilla, Raven Millhouse	5:29
3.	"Chintela Makunedu Sardaga Chivinchemu"	Vijay Prakash, Shreya Ghoshal	5:17
4.	"Yemayyindo Mansukhi Teninnu Manchhiti"	Rashid Ali, Kavita Belliga	5:23
5.	"Blue Theme"	Naresh Iyer, Vijay Prakash, Sonu Kakkar, Blaaze, A. R. Reihana, Raqeeb Alam	3:55
6.	"Priyathama"	Shreya Ghoshal, Naresh Iyer	3:26
7.	"Priyudu Kalisinadaiya Nannu Kalisinadaiya"	Madhushree, Udit Narayan, Raven Millhouse, Shi Millhouse	4:29

=== Album reception ===
Professional ratings
Review scores
Source	Rating
Bollywood Hungama	4/5 stars

The soundtrack of the film received positive reviews upon release. Bollywood Hungama reviewed the music saying "Blue is a good album and has all in it to make a good impression at the music stands. In a way, the album comes at just the right time when there is quite some variety in store this Diwali. Blue practically mixes up genres..."

== Reception ==
=== Critical reception ===
The film received mixed reviews from critics. Anupama Chopra of NDTV called the movie an 'smartly crafted underwater thriller', criticizing and at the same time praising the performance of the cast and the script. Taran Adarsh of Bollywood Hungama gave the film a positive review, praising the star cast and action scenes and gave the film 4 stars out of 5.

== Sequel ==
D'Souza announced his intentions to make a sequel titled Aasman, which would additionally feature John Abraham and Sonal Chauhan, but following Ashtavinayak's liquidation in the face of Mehta's arrest due to failed payment of loan dues, the sequel was shelved. D'Souza later directed Kumar in the 2013 film Boss instead.

== See also ==
- List of most expensive non-English-language films
