= Couples Retreat (soundtrack) =

Soundtrack album by A. R. Rahman
- Released: (United States) October 6, 2009 (India) January 18, 2010
- Recorded: Panchathan Record Inn and AM Studios, Chennai
- Genre: Film score
- Label: Relativity Music Group; Saregama (India)
- Producer: A.R. Rahman

A. R. Rahman chronology
Blue (2009)	Couples Retreat (2009)	Vinnaithaandi Varuvaayaa (2010)

Professional ratings
Review scores
Source	Rating
Movie Music UK	4/5 stars
Music Aloud	8.5/10 stars
Radio and Music	4.5/5 stars

Couples Retreat is the soundtrack to the 2009 American film of the same name, directed by Peter Billingsley and starring Vince Vaughn and Jason Bateman. The original score and songs are composed and produced by A. R. Rahman and recorded in the summer of 2009 with the Hollywood Studio Symphony at the Sony Scoring Stage. The film marks his Hollywood debut, though he has already worked for some English-language films including Slumdog Millionaire, which fetched him two Academy Awards.

The soundtrack album was released October 6, 2009 by Relativity Music Group. In India, the album was released on January 18, 2010, by Saregama.

The soundtrack was met with positive reviews. The song "NaNa" was longlisted for 2010 Academy Award for Best Original Song nominations. The soundtrack earned A. R. Rahman the BMI London Award for Best Score.

The Tamil lyrics for the song "Kurukuru Kan" was written by A. R. Rahman himself. Lyrics for "Sajna" were written by Rahman and Blaaze while that for "NaNa" were by Rahman, Blaaze and Vivianne Chaix. Rahman made his son A. R. Ameen sing the track "Nana".

== Track listing ==
No.	Title	Lyrics	Artist(s)	Length
1.	"Sajna"	A. R. Rahman, Blaaze	PJ Morton	3.40
2.	"Kurukuru Kan (Afro Nisha)"	A. R. Rahman	A. R. Rahman	2:56
3.	"Jason & Cynthia Suite"	A. R. Rahman	Instrumental	5:15
4.	"NaNa"	A. R. Rahman, Blaaze & Vivian Chaix	A. R. Rahman, Blaaze, Vivian Chaix, A. R. Ameen, Clinton Cerejo & Dominique Cerejo	3:03
5.	"Tour of the Villas"	A. R. Rahman	Instrumental	2:55
6.	"Meeting Marcel"	A. R. Rahman	Instrumental	3:31
7.	"Itinerary"	A. R. Rahman	Instrumental	3:17
8.	"Undress"	A. R. Rahman	Instrumental	1:34
9.	"Sharks"	A. R. Rahman	A. R. Rahman	2:47
10.	"Luau"	John O'brien	John O'brien	3:30
11.	"Salvadore"	A. R. Rahman	Kailash Kher & Vijay Prakash	2:24
12.	"Intervention"	A. R. Rahman	A. R. Rahman	2:47
13.	"The Waterfall"	A. R. Rahman	Instrumental	1:23
14.	"Jason & Cynthia Piano Theme"	A. R. Rahman	Instrumental, Randy Kerber (Piano)	2:30
15.	"Animal Spirits"	A. R. Rahman	Instrumental	3:36
