= Leon D'Souza =

- Born: Leon Saalis de Souza; 10 November 1985 (age 40); Panaji, Goa, India
- Education: Wilson College, Mumbai; University of Mumbai
- Occupations: Singer; songwriter; publicist
- Musical career
- Genres: Pop; rock; filmi
- Instruments: Vocals; piano
- Years active: 2011–present
- Labels: Sony Music; T-Series; Saregama; Hariharan Music

Leon D'Souza (Note: Konkani pronunciation: [lɪ.joːn ɖɪ.suː.zaː].) (born 10 November 1985) is an Indian playback singer and songwriter. He has sung in Hindi, Tamil, and Kannada film industries and has also recorded advertising jingles. He gained widespread recognition for singing "Hosanna" in the 2012 Hindi film Ekk Deewana Tha, composed by A. R. Rahman.

== Early life ==
D'Souza was born into a Goan Catholic family in Panaji, Goa, India. His maternal grandfather Menino Dias was a violinist who regularly performed at church services and local religious gatherings, and was a known figure in Taleigão, Goa. D'Souza grew up surrounded by music and learned to play the recorder and piano.

He also trained in the church choir at Gloria Church in Byculla, Mumbai, under the guidance and mentorship of Margarate Fernandes, who directed the Glorian Choir for over 40 years. This experience shaped his vocal technique and strongly influenced his musical style, which was heavily inspired by gospel music.

== Career ==
D'Souza began his career performing in gospel competitions and church choirs. He was introduced to Bollywood by A. R. Rahman, who selected him to record the Hindi version of the song "Hosanna" for Ekk Deewana Tha (2012). Originally, the song's rap section was not intended for him, but Rahman encouraged D'Souza to perform it, resulting in a signature vocal style combining soft and bold tones reminiscent of R&B artist Usher.

Following this breakthrough, D'Souza featured in the remix version of "Ek Main Aur Ekk Tu" from Ek Main Aur Ekk Tu in the same year, composed by Amit Trivedi. In 2013, he sang "Dhuaan" for the film D-Day, composed by Shankar–Ehsaan–Loy, collaborating with multiple vocalists.

D'Souza also recorded songs in Tamil and Kannada, collaborating with composers such as Ghibran and Sachin Warrier. He regularly tours internationally as a guest vocalist with Arijit Singh.

In 2019, D'Souza released his first single, "Summer 45", an electronic pop track composed by DJ Tanishq, in collaboration with Johnnie Ernest and Stich. The song reflects tropical summer themes and nostalgic imagery of beaches from his youth in Goa.

In 2022, D'Souza experienced renewed popularity when an Instagram reel featuring his performance of "Hosanna" went viral, garnering over 28 million views within 24 hours. The viral moment introduced his voice to a new generation of listeners, many of whom were unaware of the singer behind the original track.

== Musical style ==
D'Souza's music is influenced by gospel and contemporary pop, with a focus on embellishing vocal lines and exploring multiple tones within a single performance. He has expressed interest in blending independent music projects with traditional film playback singing.

== Other ventures ==
Outside of music, D'Souza founded a communications company, Storytellers101, in 2013, where he manages brand storytelling and creative projects.

== Discography ==
=== Film songs ===
Year	Song	Film	Composer	Lyricist	Co-singer(s)	Language	Notes	Ref.
2012	"Hosanna"	Ekk Deewana Tha	A. R. Rahman	Javed Akhtar	Maria Roe Vincent and Suzanne D'Mello	Hindi and English		
2012	"Ek Main Aur Ekk Tu (Remix)"	Ek Main Aur Ekk Tu	Amit Trivedi	Amitabh Bhattacharya	Benny Dayal, Anushka Manchanda and Shefali Alvaris	Hindi		
2013	"Dhuaan"	D-Day	Shankar–Ehsaan–Loy	Niranjan Iyengar	Rahul Ram, Siddharth Mahadevan, Alyssa Mendonsa, Thomson Andrews, Keshia Braganza and Crystal Sequeira	Hindi		
2013	"Ae Le Le Etti Paarthale"	Naiyaandi	Ghibran Vaibodha	Arivumathi	Sundar Narayana Rao	Tamil		
2018	"Daariya Kaledukondide"	Katheyondu Shuruvagide	Sachin Warrier	Kiran Kaverappa	Inchara Rao	Kannada		

=== Television songs ===
Year	Song	Serial/Show	Composer	Lyricist	Co-singer(s)	Language	Notes	Ref.
2012	"Teri Meri Love Stories Title Track"	Teri Meri Love Stories			Mahalaxmi Iyer	Hindi		

=== Singles ===
Year	Song	Composer	Lyricist	Co-singer(s)	Language	Notes	Ref.
2019	"Summer 45"	Leon D'Souza, Pallavi Kedar and Atul Gupta	Leon D'Souza, Pallavi Kedar and Atul Gupta		English		
2021	"Find My Way"	Candy D'Souza	Candy D'Souza		English		
