= Umarji Anuradha =

Indian writer

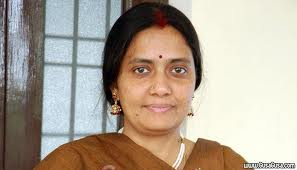
- Education: BA, Eng Lit, MA Telugu Lit
- Occupation: Writer
- Partner: Dr Kavuri Venkata Sridhar Kumar Screen Name Gautham Kashyap
- Children: 1
- Writing career
- Notable awards: Akkineni Abhinandana Award for Best Dialogue Writer of the year 2010, Super Hit Film Weekly Award

Umarji Anuradha is an Indian writer known for her works in Telugu cinema and journalism. She wrote continuously on The Legends of Indian Cinema (Vendi Tera Nirdeshakulu) for Sitara Film Weekly Magazine, the largest circulated Telugu film weekly in India. She also wrote number of dramas for All India Radio and television channels, for daily serials like Pelli Chesukundamra, for E TV., Vaisaali Serial for Zee Telugu and Gharshna serial for E TV. She was also the winner of Akkineni Abhinandana Award for Best Dialogue Writer of the year 2010 and Super Hit Film Weekly Award Super Hit Film Weekly Magazine, for the blockbuster movie, Ye Maaya Chesave.

== Early life ==
Umarji Anuradha was born to a Marathi-speaking Madhva family. Since her paternal uncle, Kuppu Rao Srinivasa Rao,(Peda Naanna) worked for the railways as station master, she had her schooling in Vijayawada, Krishna district, Andhra Pradesh and in Mangalagiri, a small but traditionally religiously popular town in Guntur District known for a Panakala Narasimha swamy temple. While continuing her studies, she also continued her habit of drama writing from school days to post-graduation. She was born to G. Nagarajan and Vemaganti Susheela and grew up for some time with Kuppu Rao Nagubai and Kuppu Rao Srinivasa Rao, a railway station master. She was born in the midst of a well-educated, sensible family with a literary background, and started writing from her childhood. Her mother Vemaganti Suseela was also a writer and an Artist of All India Radio Madras. She served as English teacher in the 'Kendriya Vidyalaya' a Central School, Government of India, in Chennai. She has an excellent track record of writing talent and literary taste.

== Career ==
=== Journalism ===
She started her career as a contributor for Eenadu News Daily in Chennai along with her husband, PhD., Research Scholar K.V. Sridhar Kumar, who worked as a photo journalist for Eenadu. Later he joined with film director Padma Shri P. Bharathi Raja, for learning and understanding the job of Film Direction. He was awarded Doctorate, for his out standing PhD Research work by the Governor of Tamil Nadu, in Chennai 2005. Later Dr. K.V. Sridhar Kumar changed his name as Gautham Kashyap for the Screen. Umarji Anuradha was recognized as the first woman staff reporter for Eenadu News Daily. She worked as an in-charge for the Eenadu Tamil Nadu edition. Later, since her husband Gautham Kashyap ( Dr. K.V. Sridhar Kumar) was absorbed as Film Script writer in Ramoji Film City, for Usha kiran Movies Films Division, she was transferred to Hyderabad. Umarji Anuradha wrote many articles, columns, features on various film personalities for Eenadu Cinema Page and Sitara Film Magazine on the name of Umarji Kumaran Kumaran is another pen name of Dr. K.V. Sridhar Kumar. Later she was promoted as desk in charge for Maharashtra Desk. She went on a special assignment to establish Mumbai Eenadu. She supervised the starting ceremony of Eenadu Mumbai Edition. She worked for Eenadu as Staff Reporter, as Cinema Desk In-Charge, and as Maharashtra Desk in charge. She was also Central desk in-charge for the central pages of all district editions of Eenadu daily news paper. Journalism and T.V. Serials.

== Filmography ==
=== As dialogue writer ===
Year	Film	Ref.
2009	Kavya's Diary	
2010	Ye Maaya Chesave	
2010	Maro Charithra	
2011	Gaganam	
2011	180	
2016	Ghatana	
