= 180 (2011 Indian film) =

- Theatrical release poster in Telugu
- Directed by: Jayendra Panchapakesan
- Screenplay by: Jayendra; Subha
- Dialogues by: Umarji Anuradha (Telugu)
- Story by: Jayendra
- Produced by: Kiran Reddy; Swaroop Reddy; C. Srikanth
- Starring: Siddharth; Priya Anand; Nithya Menen
- Cinematography: Balasubramaniem
- Edited by: Kishore Te.
- Music by: Sharreth
- Production companies: SPI Cinemas; Aghal Films
- Release date: 25 June 2011
- Running time: 122 minutes
- Country: India
- Languages: Telugu; Tamil

180 is a 2011 Indian romantic drama film directed by Jayendra Panchapakesan who co-wrote the film with Subha and Umarji Anuradha. The film was shot simultaneously in Telugu and Tamil, the latter titled Nootrenbadhu (transl. 180). It stars Siddharth, Priya Anand and Nithya Menen with notable roles being played by Moulee, Tanikella Bharani and Geetha among others. Nootrenbadhu marks Siddharth's comeback and Nithya Menen's debut film in Tamil cinema.

The film was shot on a Red One camera. Produced by SPI Cinemas and Aghal Films, the film's Tamil version was distributed by Ayngaran International. The music was composed by Sharreth, with cinematography handled by Balasubramaniem and editing work done by Kishore Te. The film was released on 25 June 2011.

== Plot ==
Dr. Ajay "AJ" Kumar comes to Hyderabad (Chennai in the Tamil version) and introduces himself as Mano. He stays with the elderly couple S. V. S. Murthy and Jayam. A do-gooder, Ajay lives life with a purpose. He gets along with everyone and wins the hearts of those close to him. D. "Vidya" Vidyalakshmi, a newspaper photojournalist, gets acquainted with him. Ajay finds satisfaction in helping others, and he sponsors the education of street children with the help of Vidya, who is attracted by his good nature. Things take a turn when she tells him about her feelings. Ajay, without informing her, decides to leave the city.

Meanwhile, a flashback reveals that Ajay was a doctor in San Francisco, where he meets Renuka "Renu" Narayanan, an interior designer. They get married only to be told months later that Ajay has cancer and has about six months before he dies. As Ajay is about to leave Chennai, Vidya has an accident. Ajay takes her to San Francisco for treatment. While in San Francisco, he meets his friend RJ "Sam" Sambasivam, who asks Ajay to meet Renu, but Ajay leaves as he sees her life is happier without him.

It is revealed that Ajay had faked his death to make Renu believe that he had died so that she would not suffer thinking about him every day. Seeing that Renu appears happy and at peace, Ajay decides not to meet her. He misses his flight to India and goes to Brazil instead. Now in Rio de Janeiro, he goes by the name José. He is seen playing football, waiting for his death.

== Cast ==
- Siddharth as Dr. Ajay "AJ" Kumar / Mano (in India) / José (in Rio de Janeiro)
- Nithya Menen as D. "Vidya" Vidyalakshmi
- Priya Anand as Renuka "Renu" Narayanan
- T. S. B. K. Moulee as S. V. S. Murthy
- Geetha as Jayam, Murthy's wife
- Sricharan as Sambasivam "Sam", an RJ and Ajay's friend
- Misha Ghoshal as Julie, Vidya's friend and roommate
- Lakshmi Ramakrishnan as Ajay's mother
- Tanikella Bharani as Narayanan, Renu's father
- Janaki Sabesh as Annapurna (Telugu)/Annalakshmi (Tamil), Renu's mother
- M. S. Narayana as Vidya's boss
- Boys Rajan as Vidya's father
- Tushar Tharayil as Nandha

== Production ==
=== Development ===
"The entire story, therefore, is a logical extrapolation of the character's actions rather than me driving the screenplay in any particular direction [...] I've waited 25 years to make this movie. I wanted to make it my way and also reach a wide audience."

— Jayendra on the making of 180

180 is the feature directorial debut of advertisement filmmaker Jayendra Panchapakesan. He previously wrote several scripts for films but they did not materialise owing to Jayendra's commitments to advertisements and his operations for Qube Cinema Technologies. After directing the concert film Margazhi Raagam (2008), Jayendra said that he "couldn't resist the idea of making a feature film". Instead of the earlier scripts he had written, Jayendra decided to write a fresh script, based on an incident he saw in the internet. He worked with the writing duo Subha for the script which took them around two years.

Jayendra wrote a romantic subject with the duo, creating "youthful characters" in order to appeal with the younger generation and firstly wrote the characters after which, according to him, "the characters wrote the script." The film's urban setting with no particular milieu prompted Jayendra to make it as a bilingual, in Tamil and Telugu languages. In Tamil, it was titled Nootrenbadhu to obtain entertainment tax exemption from the Government of Tamil Nadu.

=== Casting and filming ===
Jayendra sent the script to Siddharth, after having known him since his debut in to the film industry. Impressed by it, Siddharth accepted to play the lead role. The film marked Siddharth's return to Tamil cinema after seven years since Aayutha Ezhuthu (2004). Nithya Menen and Priya Anand were earlier screen-tested for the female lead roles, before Jayendra saw their respective performances in Kerala Cafe (2009) and Leader (2010), and impressed by it, leading them to be cast. This film marks Menen's Tamil debut.

The film was launched at AVM Studios in Vadapalani on 15 June 2010 and filming began the same day. The film was shot across Chennai and Hyderabad in the preliminary portions of the first schedule. By November, the team left to San Francisco for filming the second schedule under extreme weather conditions, where the temperature was around −4 °C (25 °F). Cinematographer Balasubramaniem shot the film through the Red Digital camera. The song "Rules Kidayathu" was filmed with the Phantom Flex, a camera which can shoot 2,500 frames per second compared to normal cameras. The film was nearly complete by April 2011.

== Music ==
180's music is composed by Malayalam composer Sharreth, in his third Tamil and second Telugu film. The soundtrack accompanied eight songs, written by Madhan Karky, Viveka and Vanamali in their respective languages. The soundtrack was released by Think Music at a launch event held at Sathyam Cinemas, while the Telugu version released a week later.

== Marketing and release ==
180's first look posters were released on the occasion of 14 February 2011, Valentine's Day. A formal press meet held at Sathyam Cinemas, Chennai on 31 March, where the makers launched the film's official website. Initially, the film was scheduled for release on 10 June, but was then postponed to 25 June. 180 was released with two other Tamil films Udhayan and Pillaiyar Theru Kadaisi Veedu.

=== Box office ===
The film opened at the second position at the Chennai box office and collected around ₹3 million. In the second week, the film slipped to the fourth position and to the fifth position in the third week, denoting an average performance at the box office.

=== Critical reception ===
IBNLive rated the film two and a half, claiming that "Jayendra has made a stylish film using the essentials of an ad film" and that the film had come out as a "finely made film with some good performances without novelty or the gripping element". Pavithra Srinivasan of Rediff also gave two and a half out of five, concluding: "180 is a visual feast, no doubt about it. Sadly it falls prey to clichés and lagging pace". Sify noted the film was totally different from the "assembly line mass masalas that is flooding the screens" and "worth a look for its superior packaging with a touch of class". Karthik Subramaniam from The Hindu criticised that the film lacked is in its screenplay and narration, that the story failed to engage and that the pace was slow. He summarised that the film felt like a "present with more attention paid to the wrapper than what's inside". N. Venkateswaran from The Times of India gave two and a half stars out of five and said "The weakest link in the story/screenplay (by Jayendra and Subha) is the character of Dr Ajay Kumar – though he is shown to be a highly educated doctor, he loses the plot when he finds out that is suffering from pancreatic cancer".

Jeevi of Idlebrain.com gave three out of five and stated that the plus points of the film were "casting and technical aspects (cinematography, music and post-production). On the flip side, the narration of the film is very slow and the last half-an-hour of the film is a bit confusing". Daily News and Analysis gave one and a half and said: "180 feels like there was an explosion at the sob story factory and little pieces from dozens of different films were jammed together into one dreadful mutant. The whole terminal illness melodrama attacks your chest so relentlessly, that by the time it's over you’re forced to beg for a defibrillator".

=== Accolades ===
Award	Date of ceremony (Note: Date is linked to the article about the awards held that year, wherever possible.)	Category	Recipient(s) and nominee(s)	Result	Ref.
Filmfare Awards South	7 July 2012	Best Female Playback Singer – Tamil	Shweta Mohan for "Nee Korinaal"	Nominated	
Filmfare Awards South	7 July 2012	Best Lyricist – Tamil	Madhan Karky for "Nee Korinaal"	Nominated	
Mirchi Music Awards South	4 August 2012	Listener's Choice Award − Song	"Nee Korinaal"	Won (3rd place)	
Tamil Nadu State Film Awards	13 July 2017	Best Cinematographer	Balasubramaniem	Won	
Vijay Awards	16 June 2012	Best Music Director	Sharreth	Nominated	
Vijay Awards	16 June 2012	Best Female Playback Singer	Shweta Mohan for "Nee Korinaal"	Nominated	
