= Kalyani Menon =

Indian playback singer (1941–2021)

- Born: 5 July 1941; Kerala, Ernakulam District, British Raj
- Died: 2 August 2021 (aged 80)
- Genre: Playback singing
- Occupation: Singer
- Years active: 1968–2021

Kalyani Menon (05 July 1941 – 2 August 2021) was an Indian playback singer who worked in the Indian film industry. After beginning her career in the 1970s as a classical singer, Kalyani established a parallel career as a singer in the film industry and worked extensively with A. R. Rahman during the late 1990s and early 2000s. She was awarded the Kerala Sangeetha Nataka Akademi Award in 2008 and the Kalaimamani Award in 2010.

== Career ==
Kalyani Menon learned classical music from M. R. Sivaraman Nair and made a mark as a classical vocalist, before gradually branching out into singing for films. An early Malayalam film song which garnered her acclaim was "Kanneerin Mazhayathum" for composer M. S. Baburaj in Ramu Kariat’s Dweepu (1977). She began working in Madras during 1977, through Dhananjayan’s Malayalam dance drama Magdalana Mariyam that was choreographed as part of the Vallathol Centenary celebrations. Kalyani sang Vallathol Narayana Menon’s lines that were set to tune by the Dhananjayan. Her first film song in Tamil was with composer Ilaiyaraaja for the song "Sevvaaname Ponmegame" from K. Balaji’s Nallathoru Kudumbam (1979) and the track found frequent airtime. The song "Nee Varuvaaiyena" from Sujatha (1980) and "Thanniya Potta Sandhosham Pirakkum" from Savaal (1981), both composed by M. S. Viswanathan became a major hit and boosted her career.

Balaji continued to ensure that Kalyani sang in some of his films in the early 1980s such as "Aei Rajave Un Rajathi" from Vazhvey Maayam (1982) and the reflective "Vidhi Varaindha Padhai Vazhiye" from Vidhi (1984). Kalyani also sang other popular songs in the period such as "Naan Iravil Ezhuthum Kavithai Muzhuthum" from Suba Muhoortham (1983) and "Theril Vandhaal Devadhai" from an unreleased film called Mookuthi Meengal.

After a period away from the film industry, Kalyani Menon worked on several albums for A. R. Rahman during the 1990s and early 2000s. She recorded for songs including "Vaadi Saathukkudi" in Pudhiya Mannargal (1993), and followed it up with the "Omana Thingal" sequence in "Kuluvalile" from the Rajinikanth-starrer Muthu (1995). She later worked on songs including the title track from Alaipayuthey, "Adhisaya Thirumanam" from Parthale Paravasam (2001) and for the three versions of Vinnaithaandi Varuvaayaa (2010) made by Gautham Vasudev Menon in Tamil, Telugu and Hindi. Kalyani also featured in Rahman's historical Vande Mataram album; and also in Ussele, the album by Srinivas, in which Kalyani and P. Unnikrishnan sang Gopalakrishna Bharathi’s "Eppo Varuvaaro" set to a modern beat.

== Personal life and death ==
Kalyani Menon was born as the only daughter of Balakrishna Menon and Karakkat Rajam in Ernakulam. Her husband was K.K. Menon, an officer in Indian Navy, who died of a heart attack in 1978, leaving her a widow at the age of 37. She was the mother of Rajiv Menon, who has worked in Indian films as a cinematographer and director and Karun Menon IRAS, a senior Civil Services officer who currently works with the Indian Railways. Rajiv became acquainted with music composer A. R. Rahman and worked with him on commercial and film projects as a result of the composer's music work with Kalyani. As a mark of respect, when the audio cassette of Rajiv Menon's Kandukondain Kandukondain (2000) was released in a grand function, Kalyani Menon was called to receive the first cassette from Kamal Haasan. Kalyani had also made a brief appearance in the film as Aishwarya Rai’s music tutor. She died on 2 August 2021 at the age of 80.

== Notable discography ==
Year	Song title	Film	Music director	Notes
1979	"Sevvaaname Ponmegame"	Nallathoru Kudumbam	Ilayaraja	
1980	"Nee Varuvaaiyena"	Sujatha	M. S. Viswanathan	
1984	"Rhithubedha Kalpana"	Mangalam Nerunnu	Ilayaraja	
1994	"Vaadi Saathukodi"	Pudhiya Mannargal	A. R. Rahman	
1994	"Indiraiyo Ival Sundariyo"	Kaadhalan	A. R. Rahman	
1994	"Alala Vale Vaana Varada Vale"	Kaadhalan - (D) Telugu	A. R. Rahman	
1995	"Kuluvalile"	Muthu	A. R. Rahman	
2000	"Alaipayuthey"	Alaipayuthey	A. R. Rahman	
2000	"Raara Venu"	Mister Butler	Vidyasagar	
2001	"Adhisaya Thirumanam"	Paarthale Paravasam	A. R. Rahman	
2004	"Chentharmizhi"	Perumazhakkalam	M. Jayachandran	
2004	"Hara Hara"	Rasikan	Vidyasagar	
2003	"Ninakkum Nilavil"	Mullavalliyum Thenmavum	Ouseppachan	
2008	"Jalashayyayil"	Laptop	Sreevalsan J. Menon	
2010	"Omana Penne"	Vinnaithaandi Varuvaayaa	A. R. Rahman	Also co-lyricist
2010	"Kundanapu Bomma"	Ye Maaya Chesave	A. R. Rahman	Also co-lyricist
2012	"Phoolon Jaisi Ladki"	Ekk Deewana Tha	A. R. Rahman	Also co-lyricist
2018	"Kathale Kathale"	96	Govind Vasantha	
