= Dear Comrade (soundtrack) =

Soundtrack album by Justin Prabhakaran
- Released: 7 June 2019
- Recorded: 2019
- Genre: Feature film soundtrack
- Length: 31:10
- Language: Telugu
- Label: Lahari Music; T-Series
- Producer: Justin Prabhakaran

Justin Prabhakaran chronology
Monster (2019)	Dear Comrade (2019)	Dharmaprabhu (2019)

Singles from Dear Comrade
- 1. "Nee Neeli Kannullona" Released: 8 May 2019; 2. "Kadalalle" Released: 17 May 2019; 3. "Girra Girra" Released: 23 May 2019; 4. "The Canteen Song" Released: 31 May 2019; 5. "Comrade Anthem" Released: 5 June 2019

Dear Comrade is the soundtrack album for the 2019 Telugu-language action drama film of the same name written and directed by Bharat Kamma and produced by Mythri Movie Makers and Yash Rangineni, starring Vijay Devarakonda, Rashmika Mandanna in the lead roles. The music is composed by Justin Prabhakaran, in his debut Telugu film. Lyrics were written by Rehman, Chaitanya Prasad and Krishna Kanth for Telugu, Karthik Netha, Viveka, Mohan Rajan, Stony Psyko, Dope Daddy and Justin Prabhakaran for Tamil, Joe Paul and Dhananjay Ranjan for Malayalam and Kannada languages respectively.

== Release ==
The film's first single track "Nee Neeli Kannullona" was released on 8 May 2019, with Gowtham Bharadwaj, rendering the song. The Times of India, stated that it is a sweet romantic ballad, talking of a man's love for his lady love. The song "Kadalalle" which featured in the film's teaser, was released as the film's second single on 17 May 2019, in which Sid Sriram and Aishwarya Ravichandran rendered the song. Although, the song is scheduled to release on 15 May, it was delayed two days due to technical difficulties, which led the crew to apologise their fans. It was released as "Pularaadha" in Tamil, "Madhupole" in Malayalam, and "Kadalanthe" in Kannada, where Sriram made his debut in Kannada as playback singer. It was considered as a soulful romantic duet. The third single "Girra Girra" was released on 23 May 2019, and was sung by Gowtham Bharadwaj and Yamini Ghantasala.

The fourth single, "The Canteen Song" was released on 31 May 2019, with four music directors Karthik Rodriguez, Nivas K. Prasanna, Jakes Bejoy and Charan Raj lent their voices in all four languages. The fifth single track, titled "Comrade Anthem" was released on 5 June 2019. The song was sung by Vijay Deverakonda for the original version, while actor Vijay Sethupathi and Dulquer Salmaan recorded its Tamil and Malayalam versions respectively. The entire soundtrack album which features all the other three songs, was released by Lahari Music on 7 June 2019.

== Marketing ==
As a part of the film's marketing purposes, a promotional music event titled as "Dear Comrade Music Festival" which was sponsored by Helo India took place in Bengaluru on 22 June 2019, Cochin on 23 June 2019, Chennai on 29 June 2019 and in Hyderabad on 1 July 2019.

== Reception ==
Siddhartha Toleti of Mirchi9 reviewed it as "an out-and-out classy thematic album." Neetishta Nyayapati of The Times of India, summarised it as "The album of Dear Comrade is mixed bag with Justin Prabhakaran and lyricist Rehman going all out to bring in their best. The OST seems like it has something to offer for everyone, mirroring every kind of mood. Give this album a chance this weekend if you are looking for dreamy numbers that also make you think." 123Telugu reviewed it as "On the whole, the album of Dear Comrade has eight different kinds of songs. But what stands out are the romantic numbers which have been composed superbly by music director Justin Prabhakaran. Kadalalle, Gira Gira, O Kalala Kathala and Neenli Neeli Kannullone our picks and will be bigger hits once the film is out. For now, the songs have set the right tone for the romantic drama and the chemistry of Vijay Devarakonda and Rashmika will make these songs even more popular in the coming days." Indiaglitz reviewed it as "The eight songs are earnest and betray the deep creative effort that went into creating them" and gave a rating of 3.25 out of 5.

== Track listing ==
Telugu

No.	Title	Lyrics	Singer(s)	Length
1.	"Nee Neeli Kannullona"	Rehman	Gowtham Bharathwaj	2:28
2.	"Kadalalle"	Rehman	Sid Sriram, Aishwarya Ravichandran	4:21
3.	"Gira Gira"	Rehman	Gowtham Bharathwaj, Yamini Ghantasala	4:48
4.	"The Canteen Song"	Rehman	Karthik Rodriguez	2:33
5.	"Comrade Anthem"	Chaitanya Prasad	Vijay Deverakonda, Stony Psyko, MC Vickey	3:26
6.	"Maama Choodaro"	Rehman	Naresh Iyer	4:29
7.	"O Kalala Kathala"	Rehman	Sathya Prakash, Chinmayi	5:05
8.	"Yetu Pone"	Krishna Kanth	Kaala Bhairava	4:09
9.	"O Kalala Kathala (Reprise)"	Rehman	Vijay Yesudas, Bombay Jayashri	4:38
Total length:				35:48

Tamil

No.	Title	Lyrics	Artist(s)	Length
1.	"Aagaasa Veedu Kattum"	Karthik Netha	Gowtham Bharathwaj	2:28
2.	"Pularaadha"	Karthik Netha	Sid Sriram, Aishwarya Ravichandran	4.21
3.	"Gira Gira"	Karthik Netha	Nakul Abhyankar, Mohana Bhogaraju	4:42
4.	"The Canteen Song"	Justin Prabhakaran	Nivas K. Prasanna	2:33
5.	"Comrade Anthem"	Stony Psyko, Dope Daddy	Vijay Sethupathi, Stony Psyko, Dope Daddy	3:26
6.	"Doshthe Takkaru"	Viveka	Naresh Iyer	4:49
7.	"Naan Varuvean"	Mohan Rajan	Sathya Prakash, Aishwarya Ravichandran	5:04
8.	"Azhaipaya"	Justin Prabhakaran	Justin Prabhakaran	4:10
Total length:				31:10

Malayalam

All lyrics are written by Joe Paul.

No.	Title	Artist(s)	Length
1.	"Neerolam Mele Moodum"	Gowtham Bharathwaj	2:28
2.	"Madhu Pole"	Sid Sriram, Aishwarya Ravichandran	4:21
3.	"Thiri Thiri"	Nakul Abhyankar, Remya Nambeesan	4:42
4.	"The Canteen Song"	Jakes Bejoy	2:33
5.	"Comrade Anthem"	Dulquer Salmaan, Stony Psyko, Dope Daddy, MC Vickey	3:26
6.	"Thaalam Kottedo"	Sarath Santhosh	4:29
7.	"Ee Kathayo"	Sathya Prakash, Chinmayi	5:04
8.	"Mazhamegham"	Sooraj Santhosh	4:10
Total length:			31:10

Kannada

All lyrics are written by Dhananjay Ranjan.

No.	Title	Artist(s)	Length
1.	"Nin Neeli Kannaliro"	Gowtham Bharathwaj	2:28
2.	"Kadalanthe"	Sid Sriram, Aishwarya Ravichandran	4.21
3.	"Gira Gira"	Yamini Ghantasala, Nakul Abhyankar	4.42
4.	"The Canteen Song"	Charan Raj	2.34
5.	"Comrade Anthem"	Gubbi, MC Vickey	3.26
6.	"Thala Aakiro"	Sarath Santhosh	4.29
7.	"Oh Kanasa Kathe"	Sathya Prakash, Chinmayi	5.04
8.	"Kareyuveya"	Sooraj Santhosh	4.08
Total length:			31:10

== Personnel ==
Credits adapted from Lahari Music

- Justin Prabhakaran – Composer, Arranger, Producer
- Sam P Keerthan – Backing Vocals
- Senthil Dass – Backing Vocals
- Dr Narayanan – Backing Vocals
- Yogi Sekar – Backing Vocals
- Shibi Srinivasan – Backing Vocals
- Deepesh Krishnamoorthy – Backing Vocals
- Varun Kumar – Backing Vocals
- Naveen Raj – Backing Vocals
- Deepak Blue – Backing Vocals
- Vikram – Backing Vocals
- Sarath Santhosh – Backing Vocals
- Ajaey Shravan – Backing Vocals
- Sugandh Shekar – Backing Vocals
- Govind Prasad – Backing Vocals
- Pavan – Backing Vocals
- Yogaraj – Backing Vocals
- Velu – Backing Vocals
- Aravindh Raj – Backing Vocals
- Vijay Anand – Backing Vocals
- M. Nagarajan – Backing Vocals
- Muthuraman – Backing Vocals
- Antony Raj – Backing Vocals
- Perumal Varadhan – Backing Vocals
- Priya Prakash – Backing Vocals
- Karpagam – Backing Vocals
- Nincy Vencent – Backing Vocals
- Sharmila – Backing Vocals
- Shanthi – Backing Vocals
- Hemambiga – Backing Vocals
- Vijai Bulganin – Vocal Conductor
- Rama Krishna – Lyrics Conductor
- P. Vijay Ananth – Flute, Ocarina
- Seenu – Electric Mandolin, Ektara, Esraj, Swarmandal, Xylophone, Pipa, Santoor, Sarod, Ukulele
- Balaji – Electric Violin
- Josh Mark Raj – Acoustic Guitar, Electric Guitar
- Joseph Vijay – Acoustic Guitar
- Sam Solomon – Acoustic Guitar
- Naveen – Bass Guitar
- Thomas Xavier – Brass
- Maxwell Rajan – Brass
- Martin Vijay – Brass
- Irudayaraj Babu – Brass
- Bala Subramani – Nadaswaram
- Sebastian Sathish – Keys
- Balu – Tavil
- Kavi Raj – Ganjira, Percussions
- Shruthi Raj – Tapes
- Barath Dhanasekar – Live Drums, Percussions, Rhythm and Synthesizer Arrangement
- T. Raja – Percussions
- Kumar – Percussions
- Karthik Vamsi – Percussions
- Venkat – Percussions
- Antony Raj – Musicians Co-Ordinator (The Station Inn)
- Nirmal Raj – Musicians Co-Ordinator (Hymn Studio)
- Sujith Sreedhar – Recording Engineer (2BarQ Studios)
- Adithyan – Recording Engineer (2BarQ Studios)
- Akhil Alex Mathew – Recording Engineer (2BarQ Studios)
- Abishek Mahendiran – Recording Engineer (2BarQ Studios)
- Lijesh – Recording Engineer (Voice and Vision Studios)
- Biju – Recording Engineer (Inspired One Studio)
- Senthil Prasad – Recording Engineer (Vanaj Kesav Digi Audio Waves)
- Vishnu Namboothiri – Recording Engineer (Krimson Avenue Studios)
- Balu Thankachan – Audio Mixing (20db Studios)
- Elwin Joseph – Audio Mixing (20db Studios)
- Hariharan – Audio Mixing (20db Studios)
- Thiru – Audio Mixing (Berachah Studios)
- Shadab Rayeen – Audio Mastering (New Edge Studios)
- Vivek Thomas – Audio Mastering (Berachah Studios)
- David Selvam – Audio Mastering (Berachah Studios)
