= Nallathoru Kudumbam =

- Poster
- Directed by: K. Vijayan
- Written by: A. L. Narayanan (dialogues)
- Story by: Balamurugan
- Produced by: K. Balaji
- Starring: Sivaji Ganesan; Vanisri
- Cinematography: G. Or. Nathan
- Edited by: B. Kandhasamy
- Music by: Ilaiyaraaja
- Production company: Sujatha Cine Arts
- Release date: 3 May 1979
- Country: India
- Language: Tamil

Nallathoru Kudumbam (transl. Wonderful family) is a 1979 Indian Tamil-language drama film, directed by K. Vijayan. The film stars Sivaji Ganesan and Vanisri. It is a remake of the Telugu film Aalu Magalu. The film was released on 3 May 1979.

== Plot ==
Raja and his friend, Vanisri get married as per the dying wish of Raja's grandfather. Their marital life gets affected due to a misunderstanding regarding one of Raja's ex-girlfriends Rajni when she calls him in his capacity as a doctor to save her son's life. Her son dies as Vanisri hides the call suspecting that they are having an affair. They break up with Sivaji taking their son. She is however pregnant and she brings up her son independently to show that a son without a father can do well, just as he endeavors to show that a son without mother can do well too. Both the sons grow up well and are studious while also being in love with their colleagues. They get married and the respective daughters-in-law mistreat both Sivaji and Vanisri. They realize that while sons had been their focus, they had lost their marital lives in the process. Situation forces them to come together so that they can fix their son's lives.

== Cast ==
- Sivaji Ganesan
- Vanisri
- Deepa
- Thengai Srinivasan
- Manorama
- V. K. Ramasamy
- Nagesh (Special Appearance)
- K. Balaji
- A. Sakunthala
- Vijayalalitha as Rajini
- Bindu as Kamala
- Major Sundarrajan
- M. R. R. Vasu
- G. Srinivasan
- Master Sekhar
- Kutty Padmini
- T. P. Muthulakshmi
- Manju Bhargavi

== Soundtrack ==
The music was composed by Ilaiyaraaja, with lyrics by Kannadasan. The song "Sevvaname Ponmegame.." is the debut of playback singer Kalyani Menon.

Song	Singers
"Kanna Un Leela Vinodam.."	T. M. Soundararajan, P. Susheela
"Sindhunadhi Karaiyoram.."	P. Susheela, T. M. Soundararajan
"One and Two.. Chachchachaa.."	L. R. Eswari, T. M. Soundararajan
"Sevvaname Ponmegame.."	P. Jayachandran, T. L. Maharajan, Kalyani Menon, B. S. Sasirekha
"Pattadhellaam Podhumaa.."	T. M. Soundararajan

== Reception ==
Kalki negatively reviewed the film.
