= Suzanne D'Mello =

Indian singer

- Also known as: Suzanne Dmello, Suzie Q
- Born: 15 October 1978 (age 48); Mumbai, Maharashtra, India
- Genres: Pop, Jazz, R&B.
- Occupations: Singer, Song Writer, Vocal Arranger, Lyricst
- Years active: 1994–present

Suzanne D'Mello, formerly known as Suzie Q, is an Indian playback singer of Bollywood films and other regional films. She also has voiced jingles for television advertisements.

== Career ==
Over the years, Suzanne has worked with several music directors including A.R. Rahman, Pritam, Sajid-Wajid, Ilaiyaraaja, Harris Jayaraj, Yuvan Shankar Raja, Salim–Sulaiman, Anu Malik, Bappi Lahiri and Vishal–Shekhar. She has sung up to 50 songs as a playback singer in Bollywood. In 2005, Suzanne sang her first playback song for music director Pritam – "Khalish" from the film ' Chocolate'. The song that first got her recognised was "Mahiya" from the film ' Awaarapan', for which she received her First nomination at the Stardust Awards in 2008. This was followed by a string of superhits like " Jee Karda" from 'Singh Is Kinng', "Pyaar Karke" from 'Pyaar Ke Side Effects', "Signaal" from 'Bhagam Bhag', "Meow" from 'Golmaal Returns'.

Her super hit "Aye Bachchu" from the Blockbuster 'Ghajini', earned her a nomination at the Tata Indicom Mirchi Music Awards 2009. Following this was yet another String of Super Hit Songs like "Surili Ankhiyon Wale" from 'Veer', "Rishtey Naatey" from 'De Dana Dan', "Chiggy Wiggy" from Blue where Suzanne collaborated yet again with A.R.Rahman and Australian Pop Star, Kylie Minogue, and "Naina Miley" from 'Robot'. Her Super Hit Songs that have topped the charts are "Challa" from 'Crook' and "No Problem" from 'No Problem'. Besides Bollywood, Suzanne has a few Hits even in the South. She received great recognition and appreciation for her vocals on "Hosannah" from "Vinnaithaandi Varuvaaya" (Tamil), "Nalamdhana" from 'Silambattam' (Tamil) and currently for the song "Ayyayo Ayyayo" from 'Veera Parampare' (Kannada).

Besides Bollywood, D'Mello has two songs "Latika's Theme" and "Dreams on Fire" in the Oscar and Grammy Award-winning soundtrack of the Hollywood film Slumdog Millionaire (2008). She was also part of A. R. Rahman's Jai Ho tour.

Suzanne also tours with her Band performing Western music covering genres like RnB, Retro, Jazz, Pop, Country and Broadway.

Suzanne is also the Vocal Producer and Arranger for India's popular a cappella group Raaga Trippin'. The band covers both Western and Bollywood songs in Acapella which is simply music without instruments using the voice only. Suzanne has toured India and the world with these Bands and is currently working on her own album.

== Discography ==
=== Film songs ===
Year	Song name	Film name
2002	"Yeh Sheher Hai"	Raaz
2005	"Khalish"	Chocolate
2005	"Jhoom"	Ek Khiladi Ek Haseena
2006	"Signaal"	Bhagam Bhag
2006	"Pyaar Karke"	Pyaar Ke Side Effects
2006	"Paisa Paisa"	Apna Sapna Money Money
2006	"Dil Laga Na"	Dhoom 2
2006	"Shake It"	Naksha
2006	"Hibbaki"	The Killer
2007	"You're My Love"	Partner
2007	"Do You Wanna Partner"	Partner
2007	"Dupatta Tera Nau Rang Da"	Partner
2007	"So Cool"	Go
2007	"Mahiya"	Awaarapan
2008	"Aye Bachchu"	Ghajini
2008	"Nallamdhana"	Silambattam (Tamil)
2008	"Tu Mera Jumbo"	Jumbo
2008	"Jee Karda"	Singh Is Kinng
2008	"Meow" (English and Hindi)	Golmaal Returns
2008	"Vacancy"	Golmaal Returns
2008	"EMI"	EMI
2008	"Khushi"	Drona (Backup singer)
2008	"Hey Ya"	Kidnap
2008	"Hello"	Hello
2008	"Rubaru"	Ru Ba Ru
2008	"Na Dekho"	Ru Ba Ru
2008	"Khwab Dekhe (Sexy Lady)"	Race (Backing and English Vocals)
2008	"Mujhpe Toh Jadoo"	Race (Backing and English Vocals)
2008	"Race Saason Ki"	Race (Backing and English Vocals)
2008	"Zara Zara Touch Me"	Race (Backing and English Vocals)
2009	"Dil Dara Ve"	Maan Sanmaan (Marathi)
2009	"Kites in the Sky"	Kites
2009	"Surili Akhiyon Wale"	Veer
2009	"Rishte Naate"	De Dana Dan
2009	"Rishte Naate" (Remix)	De Dana Dan
2009	"Prem Ki Naiyya"	Ajab Prem Ki Ghazab Kahani
2009	Chiggy Wiggy	Blue
2009	Chiggy Wiggy	Blue - Dubbed (Telugu)
2009	"Poorza Poorza"	Life Partner (English Vocals)
2009	"Ishq Vishk"	Wanted
2009	"Le Le Mazaa"	Wanted (Backing and Spanish Vocals)
2009	"Bhangra Bistar"	Dil Bole Hadippa! (Backing Vocals)
2009	"Aahun Aahun"	Love Aaj Kal
2009	"Twist"	Love Aaj Kal (English Vocals) by Saif Ali Khan
2009	"Aalam Guzrne Ko"	Kal Kissne Dekha
2009	"Soniye Billori"	Kal Kissne Dekha
2009	"Don't Say Alvida"	Main Aurr Mrs Khanna
2009	"Latika's Theme"	Slumdog Millionaire
2009	"Dreams on Fire"	Slumdog Millionaire
2010	"Chahta Kitna Tumko Dil"	Shaapit
2010	"No Problem"	No Problem
2010	"Ayyayyo Ayyayyo"	Veera Parampare
2010	"Challa"	Crook
2010	"Naina Mile"	Robot (Dubbed)
2010	"Kehna Hai"	Help
2010	Attrah Baras Ki	Hello Darling
2010	Sajde (Remix)	Khatta Meetha (English Vocals)
2010	"Hosanna"	Vinnaithaandi Varuvaaya (Tamil)
2010	Ee Hridayam	Ye Maaya Chesave (Telugu)
2010	Tum chain ho	Milenge Milenge
2011	"Tum Ho"	Rockstar
2011	"Chak Glassi"	Pyaar Ka Punchnama
2011	"Tum Ho Mera Pyaar"	Haunted
2011	"Full Volume"	Thank You
2011	"Mazhai Varum Arikuri"	Veppam (Tamil)
2011	"Yeh Zameen"	18.11: A Code of Secrecy
2012	"Jaavedaan Hai"	1920: Evil Returns
2012	"Cigarette Ki Tarah"	Cigarette Ki Tarah
2012	"Right Now"	Housefull 2
2012	"Hosanna"	Ekk Deewana Tha (soundtrack)
2013	"Inikka Inikka"	Naiyaandi
2013	"Kadal Naan Dhaan"	Endrendrum Punnagai (Tamil)
2014	"Khalifa"	Lekar Hum Deewana Dil (soundtrack) (Rap And Chorus Portions)
2014	"Thumka"	Kaanchi
2015	"Matargashti"	Tamasha (soundtrack) (Backing Vocals For NaNaNa Tune)
2015	"Parade De La Bastille"	Tamasha (soundtrack) (Vocals For NaNaNa Tune)
2016	"Wafa Ne Bewafai"	Teraa Surroor
2018	"Pullinangal"	2.0 (Tamil, also singer for Telugu and Hindi dubs)
2019	"Haye Dil"	Parey Hut Love (Backing Vocals; Urdu)
2023	"Mohabbatein Shukriya"	Pippa
2025	"Housefull 5 Mixtape"	Housefull 5
2025	"Taaron Mein Ek Tanha Taara"	Saiyaara
2025	"Jaa Yahaan Se!"	Saiyaara
2025	"I Love You Krish Kapoor!"	Saiyaara
2026	"Supernova"	Bol Bol Rani
2026	"Kaan Phaad"	Mirzapur (film)

=== Non-film songs ===
Year	Song name	Album name	Co-artist(s)	Note(s)
2002	"Kahi Bati"	Shishu	Zubeen Garg	Backing vocal only

== Filmography as Lyricist ==
- 2009– Veer
- 2009 – Main Aurr Mrs Khanna ( Hindi )
- 2006 – Apna Sapna Money Money ( Hindi )

== Awards ==
- Nominated: Vijay Award for Best Female Playback Singer (2011) – Mazhai Varum Arikuri (Veppam)
- Nominated: Apsara Award for Best Female Playback Singer (2010) – Aye Bachchu (Ghajini)
- Nominated: Tata Indicom Mirchi Music Awards Upcoming Vocalist Of The Year (2009) – Aye Bachchu (Ghajini)
- Nominated: Stardust Awards Best Debut Female Playback Singer (2008)- Mahiya (Awaarapan)

== See also ==
List of Indian playback singers
