= Blaaze =

- Born: Lakshmi Narasimha Vijaya Rajagopala Sheshadri Sharma Rajesh Raman; 15 October 1975 (age 51)
- Origin: Chennai, Tamil Nadu, India
- Genre: Hip hop
- Occupations: Producer, musician, rapper, singer, songwriter, lyricist, editor, actor
- Years active: 1991–present
- Website: blaaze.in

Lakshmi Narasimha Vijaya Rajagopala Sheshadri Sharma Rajesh Raman (born 15 October 1975), professionally known as Blaaze (/ˈblɑːzeɪ/), is an Indian Tamil language playback singer and rapper in Indian cinema who specializes in writing and performing rap music. An Indian by birth, born in Chennai, he grew up in Zambia and later did his education in England and in the US.

== Life and career ==
Blaaze was born on the Vijaya Dashami day of 1975 into a Brahmin family from Mylapore in Chennai, Tamil Nadu, India. The name 'Vijaya' was added to his full name because of his birth on Vijaya Dashami. He was later raised in Kitwe, Zambia, educated in England and graduated from Columbia College Hollywood, United States. His father being an architect, his family toured around the entire country with Blaaze starting to perform Breakdance on the sets his father designed, when he was 9. He then moved on to rapping and his music career began with a performance for President Chiluba of Zambia during the election campaign in October 1991 at the age of 16 and just 5 months later he produced and performed in Zambia's first ever music video Advice 4 Livin' with the Zambian national broadcasting corporation.

Ten years later, in 2002 his entry into the Indian film industry happened, when A. R. Rahman appointed Blaaze to sing his first song in Tamil cinema, the "Baba Rap" for Rajinikanth's movie Baba. Thereafter he performed for several Chennai film industry songs frequently under Rahman's direction on scores for Kangalal Kaidhu Sei, Boys, Enakku 20 Unakku 18, New, Aayutha Ezhuthu, Anbe Aaruyire . Other music directors from the film industry also started using Blaaze's rap talent in their films like Yuvan Shankar Raja for Manmadhan and Vallavan and the likes of Harris Jayaraj, Joshua Sridhar, Deva, Mani Sharma, Devi Sri Prasad inter alia for their films respectively. He has also done the rap lyrics for the title track of the famous Star One show Remix. He has appeared as himself in the music videos of several songs he has rapped for, including "Yennadi Muniyamma" (Vathiyar), "Taxi Taxi" (Sakkarakatti), "Vaanam Ellai" (Unnaipol Oruvan) and "Padapadakkudhu Maname" (Moondru Per Moondru Kadal). Blaaze with several others like A.R. Rahman, and Apache India played a significant role in familiarizing hip hop in South India in the previous decade.

His famous songs include "The Boss" and "Style" for Sivaji: The Boss,,"CEO in the House" for Sarkar, "Hey Salaa" for Aegan, "Gangsta Blues" for Slumdog Millionaire, "Hosanna" for Vinnaithaandi Varuvaayaa, "Raajali" for 2.0. He also co-wrote the song "Dreams on Fire" from Slumdog Millionaire, as well as being the lyricist on Gangsta Blues, from Slumdog Millionaire. With guidance from A. R. Rahman, Blaaze wrote the official UN Anthem for Poverty, "Pray For Me Brother". His continued perseverance to rap about issue-oriented subjects earned him the nation's vote for MTV Youth Icon of the Year 2008.

He has rapped in Mohanlal's Malayalam movie Casanova and is the lyricist for two songs on the Vince Vaughn motion picture Couples Retreat., co-written with A. R. Rahman, and, "NaNa", co-written with Vivian Chaix and A. R. Rahman. His band, ZambeZi funK, is ready with their debut album, funKalistiC syllaBleZ. His non-film work comprises issue oriented music, with messages being spread on the Gujarat Riots, Bilkis Bano, the religious issues in India, banning of corrupt police in the song "Ban The Crooked Police"... Inquilab, and "Stand Up Unite", for the Mumbai terror attacks. He has worked as a Music Director for the Warner Bros film Saas, Bahu Aur ex, with a song on a new age India, called, "What's Up India". The film was directed by Shona Urvashi.

He has also worked as music director for the soundtrack of the film Striker. In September 2011, 'Time For Gandhi' – BlaaZe's debut album – India's first real hip hop 'protest' album – was released on EMI VIRGIN MUSIC.He lives in Chennai with his family. His sister, Rekha Srinivasan, is a trained Bharatnatyam and Kathak Dancer, residing in New Jersey and founder of the Bhaarat Nritya Academy. With over 100 students trained and mentored, and several accolades, she is a pillar of the New Jersey Community. Bhaarat Nritya Academy

BlaaZé teamed up with Music Director Paul Jacob, and together they released the world's first Sanskrit hip hop album, Rap Bhakthi Mala.

In 2012, Blaaze collaborated with actor Dhanush, who sang the song while Blaaze rapped, with the music composed by Anirudh Ravichander and the music video directed by Vetrimaaran, as part of the ad campaign for the album ''Tata Nano''.

== Awards ==
- MTV Youth Icon 2008

Chosen out of 8,000 probable, and voted as India's favourite, MTV Networks, announced its 8 winners of the Pepsi MTV Youth Icon Awards in 2008. BlaaZe won the votes for his contribution to socially relevant issues through his music, and his lyrics for the official UN anthem on poverty alleviation, Pray For Me, Brother, composed by A R Rahman.
