= Ye Maaya Chesave =

2010 Indian Telugu-language film by Gautham Vasudev Menon

- Directed by: Gautham Vasudev Menon
- Screenplay by: Gautham Vasudev Menon
- Dialogues by: Anuradha
- Produced by: Manjula Ghattamaneni; Sanjay Swaroop
- Starring: Naga Chaitanya; Samantha
- Cinematography: Manoj Paramahamsa
- Edited by: Anthony
- Music by: A. R. Rahman
- Production company: Indira Productions
- Release date: 26 February 2010
- Running time: 162 minutes
- Country: India
- Language: Telugu
- Budget: ₹10 crore
- Box office: est. ₹30 crore

Ye Maaya Chesave (transl. What magic have you done?) is a 2010 Indian Telugu-language romantic drama film written and directed by Gautham Vasudev Menon. The film stars Naga Chaitanya and Samantha in her debut as lead. It was produced by Manjula Ghattamaneni under the banner Indira Productions with the soundtrack composed by A. R. Rahman. The film featured cinematography by Manoj Paramahamsa, editing by Anthony, and dialogue by Umarji Anuradha.

The film was simultaneously shot in Tamil as Vinnaithaandi Varuvaayaa starring Simbu and Trisha. The film received positive reviews from critics and was successful at the box office. It was remade in Hindi as Ekk Deewana Tha. Film Companion has listed it among the "25 Greatest Telugu Films of The Decade".

== Plot ==
Karthik (Naga Chaitanya), a mechanical engineering graduate aspiring to become a filmmaker, lives with his family on the ground floor of a two-storey house in Hyderabad. The upper portion is occupied by a traditional Syrian Catholic family, whose daughter Jessie (Samantha Ruth Prabhu) immediately attracts Karthik’s attention. Although Jessie is older than him and raised under strict supervision, Karthik falls in love with her at first sight. When he confesses his feelings, Jessie rebuffs him, uncomfortable with pursuing any relationship due to her father’s conservative nature.

Jessie later travels to Alappuzha to visit her relatives. Upon learning this, Karthik follows her with his friend Krishna and introduces himself to her family as her classmate. The two decide to remain friends, but during the return train journey, Karthik impulsively kisses Jessie. She reacts angrily yet continues to meet him, gradually acknowledging her affection. However, she remains conflicted, aware that her father will not approve of her marrying outside their faith.

Their relationship is eventually discovered by Jessie’s brother Jerry (Sudheer Babu), leading to a confrontation in which Karthik, who also trains as a boxer, defeats Jerry and his friends. The incident prompts Jessie’s parents to fix her marriage with Roy Thomas (Surya). On the wedding day, Jessie refuses the match, causing further strain within her family. Although she and Karthik continue their relationship in secret, pressures escalate when her father insists on another arranged alliance. Jessie reaches out to Karthik for help, but he is occupied with a film shoot in Goa and fails to respond in time. Feeling hurt and unsupported, Jessie decides to end the relationship.

Karthik later learns that Jessie has moved abroad after getting married. Two years pass, during which he meets Nandini, who develops feelings for him, but he turns her down as he is unable to forget Jessie. He eventually channels his experiences into writing his first film, a romantic drama based on his own life, titled Jessie, starring Silambarasan and Trisha.

Three years later, Karthik meets Jessie again in the United States and assumes she is married. Jessie reveals that she had rejected every proposal after their breakup because her parents had refused to accept Karthik, leading to her estrangement from them. The two reconcile and ultimately marry, performing ceremonies in both a Hindu temple and a church. The film concludes with the couple watching Karthik’s film Jessie in a theatre.

== Cast ==
- Naga Chaitanya as Karthik Naidu
- Samantha as Jessie Thekekuthu (Voice dubbed by Chinmayi)
- Krishnudu as a fictional role of himself, Karthik's friend
- Sanjay Swarup as Raghava Rao, Karthik's father
- Surekha Vani as Mrs. Raghava Rao, Karthik's mother
- Trisha Alex as Anupama, Karthik's sister
- Devan as Joseph Thekekuthu, Jessie's father
- Lakshmi Ramakrishnan as Teresa Thekekuthu, Jessie's mother
- Sudheer Babu as Jerry Thekekuthu, Jessie's brother (uncredited)
- Puri Jagannath as himself
- Simbu as himself (cameo appearance)
- Trisha as herself (cameo appearance)
- Sapan Saran as Nandini
- Sudhir as Regie
- Surya as Roy Thomas
- Subbulakshmi as Jessie's grandmother
- Pradeep as George, Jessie's uncle
- Ritu as Jessie's sister
- Gautham Vasudev Menon as an actor (guest appearance)

== Production ==
After the announcement of Gautham Menon's Tamil project with the working title, Jessy, Manjula Ghattamaneni (Mahesh Babu's sister) approached Gautham Menon to do a Telugu version of the same, with Mahesh Babu in the lead. Gautham, who was initially hesitant to do another version, later agreed to Manjula's proposal and forwarded the script to Mahesh Babu although he felt that it "is not Mahesh kind of film". Mahesh Babu could not allocate dates for the film and was later replaced by Naga Chaitanya. Newcomer Samantha, who had starred in three unreleased Tamil films, makes her debut with this film. Menon scheduled the shoots of many portions simultaneously. The Tamil version had a different cast and ending. Menon started writing the film as a simple love story which slowly became an intense love story, as the scripting phase progressed. Stating that the film would narrate the romantic tale of two people called Karthik and Jessie over a period of almost three years, he revealed that the film would be "conversation driven" and hoped "everybody will identify with the lead pair".

The film was shot in Chennai, Alappuzha, Goa and Hyderabad. The climax was shot at Central Park. Shooting continued through the latter part of 2009, with the film garnering significant media interest, with schedules in the United States, with Princeton University being used as a backdrop for song picturisation.

Trisha and Silambarasan made a cameo in this version, and Telugu director Puri Jagannadh appears as himself in a guest role.

== Soundtrack ==
A. R. Rahman composed the soundtrack and background score of the film. Ye Maaya Chesave / Vinnaithaandi Varuvaaya, marked the beginning of a collaboration between Rahman and Gautham Menon. The album consists of seven tracks, with Telugu lyrics penned by Anantha Sreeram. Rahman's compositions for the Tamil version were retained, without any change, in the Telugu version.

Rahman won his first Filmfare Award in Telugu for this album. Rahman reused the same tunes for the Hindi remake of the film (Ekk Deewana Tha), also directed by Gautham Menon.

== Reception ==
A critic from Rediff.com wrote that "this feel-good film is a must watch especially for those fond of love stories". A critic from The Times of India wrote that "More than the familiar plot of boy-meets-the-girl, director Gautam Menon tactfully works around the initial hiccups, scepticism and charming trepidation of first love". Jeevi of Idlebrain.com wrote that "This film has all the ingredients for a movie to remain as a timeless classic".

== Awards and nominations ==
Date of ceremony	Award	Category	Recipient(s) and nominee(s)	Result	Ref.
20 June 2011	CineMAA Awards	Best Film	Ye Maaya Chesave	Nominated	
20 June 2011	CineMAA Awards	Best Director	Gautham Vasudev Menon	Won	
20 June 2011	CineMAA Awards	Best Actor	Naga Chaitanya	Nominated	
20 June 2011	CineMAA Awards	Best Actress	Samantha	Nominated	
20 June 2011	CineMAA Awards	Best Female Debut	Samantha	Won	
20 June 2011	CineMAA Awards	Best Music Director	A. R. Rahman	Won	
20 June 2011	CineMAA Awards	Best Lyricist	Ananta Sriram ("Vintunnaava")	Nominated	
20 June 2011	CineMAA Awards	Best Male Playback Singer	Vijay Prakash ("Ee Hrudayam (Hosanna)")	Nominated	
20 June 2011	CineMAA Awards	Best Female Playback Singer	Shreya Ghoshal ("Vintunnaava")	Nominated	
20 June 2011	CineMAA Awards	Best Cinematographer	Manoj Paramahamsa	Won	
2 July 2011	Filmfare Awards South	Best Film	Ye Maaya Chesave	Nominated	
2 July 2011	Filmfare Awards South	Best Director	Gautham Menon	Nominated	
2 July 2011	Filmfare Awards South	Best Actor	Naga Chaitanya	Nominated	
2 July 2011	Filmfare Awards South	Best Actress	Samantha	Nominated	
2 July 2011	Filmfare Awards South	Best Female Debut	Samantha	Won	
2 July 2011	Filmfare Awards South	Best Music Director	A. R. Rahman	Won	
2 July 2011	Filmfare Awards South	Best Lyricist	Ananta Sriram ("Vintunnaava")	Nominated	
2 July 2011	Filmfare Awards South	Best Male Playback Singer	Vijay Prakash ("Ee Hrudayam (Hosanna)")	Nominated	
2 July 2011	Filmfare Awards South	Best Cinematographer	Manoj Paramahamsa	Won	
5 August 2011	Nandi Awards	Best Screenplay Writer	Gautham Menon	Won	
5 August 2011	Nandi Awards	Best Female Dubbing Artist	Chinmayi (for Samantha)	Won	
5 August 2011	Nandi Awards	Special Jury Award	Samantha	Won	

== Legacy ==
The scene where Jessie addresses Karthik as her brother is parodied in the film Sudigadu (2012). The title of the film inspired a similarly named film Ye Mantram Vesave (2018) starring Vijay Deverakonda. A film titled Kundanapu Bomma, based on the song from this film, released in 2016. The sequence when Karthik (Naga Chaitanya) leans on the gate when he is in love with Jessie in the song "Ee Hridayam" is parodied by Viva Harsha in Nenorakam (2017).
