= Ekk Deewana Tha =

- Theatrical release poster
- Directed by: Gautham Vasudev Menon
- Screenplay by: Gautam Vasudev Menon
- Dialogues by: Manu Rishi
- Story by: Gautham Vasudev Menon
- Based on: Vinnaithaandi Varuvaayaa and Ye Maaya Chesave by Gautham Vasudev Menon
- Produced by: Gautham Vasudev Menon; Elred Kumar; Reshma Gatala; Jayaraman; Venaknt Somasundaram
- Starring: Prateik Babbar; Amy Jackson; Manu Rishi
- Cinematography: M. S. Prabhu
- Edited by: Anthony
- Music by: A. R. Rahman
- Production companies: Fox Star Studios; Photon Kathaas Productions; RS Infotainment
- Distributed by: Fox Star Studios
- Release date: 16 February 2012
- Running time: 137 minutes
- Country: India
- Language: Hindi
- Budget: ₹14 crore
- Box office: est.₹8.55 crore

Ekk Deewana Tha (transl. There was a crazy lover) is a 2012 Indian Hindi-language romantic drama film written and directed by Gautham Vasudev Menon. The film stars Prateik Babbar, Amy Jackson (her Hindi debut), and Manu Rishi in lead roles. The film is a remake of Menon's own 2010 bilingual film Vinnaithaandi Varuvaayaa (Tamil) / Ye Maaya Chesave (Telugu). It features a reused soundtrack and film score composed by A. R. Rahman, while the cinematography and editing were handled by M. S. Prabhu and Anthony, respectively.

While in production, the film was titled Prem Katha but was renamed as Ekk Deewana Tha as the director wanted an abstract title for the film, similar to the original. The film, produced by Fox Star Studios, Photon Kathaas and RS Infotainment, was released on 16 February 2012 in two different versions with a number of endings to suit the taste of regional viewers. The film opened to mixed reviews and had a lukewarm reception at the box office.

== Plot ==
Sachin Kulkarni (Prateik Babbar) is a student of mechanical engineering in Mumbai who aspires to become a filmmaker. His friend introduces him to cinematographer Anay (Manu Rishi). With Anay's help, Sachin becomes an assistant director. Sachin's family, who are Marathi Brahmins, rent Jessie Thekekuttu's house. Jessie (Amy Jackson) is from a conservative Malayali Syrian Catholic "Nasrani" family from Alappuzha, Kerala, that lives upstairs. Sachin falls in love with Jessie the moment he meets her. He tries to interact with Jessie, who is afraid of speaking to men around her strict father and ends up angering Jessie. Unable to hide his feelings for her any longer, Sachin confesses his love for her, to which she does not respond. A few days later, Sachin learns from his sister that Jessie has gone to Kerala to visit her grandmother. He, along with Anay, ends up in Kerala to look for her. After several days, he finds her and apologises. She introduces him to her family in Kerala as her "classmate." Jessie denies she has any feelings for him but agrees to be his friend. On the train journey back home, however, the two get closer and share a passionate kiss. Sachin is convinced Jessie loves him; the two meet several times, and Jessie begins to admit that she also likes Sachin but wants to refrain from any problems because she knows her father wouldn't give her hand in marriage to a Hindu. Consequently, due to various misunderstandings between Jessie's brother and Sachin, her parents learn of their supposed affair. They arrange her marriage with someone else and fix a wedding date. The day arrives, and midway through the ceremony, Jessie refuses to marry the groom, displeasing everyone in her family. Sachin, who had, without anyone's knowledge, come to Kerala to witness the wedding, is ecstatic and secretly visits Jessie at her home. It is then that Jessie admits she has indeed fallen in love with him. Sachin and Jessie continue to meet each other without their parents knowing.

At this point, Sachin goes to Goa on a forty-day shoot, where he gets busy. Meanwhile, the topic of Jessie's marriage comes up again at her home when the man whom she refused to marry earlier pays them a visit. Panicking, Jessie calls Sachin and tells him that she wants to elope with him. Sachin, who is travelling through less than ideal places, tells Jessie to stay in Mumbai for now and that soon he will be back and they can discuss. Jessie stops taking Sachin's calls, so he goes back one night to check on Jessie. He learns that Jessie has decided to break up, as the relationship is not peaceful due to her parents' disapproval. She says she has agreed to marry a boy of her parents' choice. When Sachin pleads with her not to do it, she tells him that a time had come when she was willing to elope, but the moment was gone. She doesn't want Sachin to wait for her, as he has his dreams to fulfill. Sachin later learns that she is married and settled abroad.

Two years later, Sachin meets Samantha. She falls in love with him but is rejected by Sachin, who hasn't yet gotten over Jessie. He then comes up with a script for his first film, which happens to be his very own love story. He calls upon an actor as the film's protagonist, Samantha as the female lead, and Anay as the film's cinematographer, and the film is eventually titled Jessie. While shooting for the film in Taj Mahal, he sees Jessie, and she comes to speak with him. She admits that she is not married and is still in love with him, and he too says she is still in his heart. Sachin proposes yet again, and they get married the same day. This is actually revealed to be the climax in Sachin's film, which Sachin and Jessie in real life are watching together in the theatre. After the film ends, Jessie praises Sachin for his efforts, and the latter agrees to drop her home, implying that they have reunited.

== Cast ==
- Prateik Babbar as Sachin Kulkarni
- Amy Jackson as Jessie Thekekuthu (voice dubbed by Chinmayi)
- Shruti Bapna as Anu Kulkarni, Sachin's sister
- Manu Rishi as Anay
- Sachin Khedekar as Anand Kulkarni, Sachin's father
- Babu Antony as Advocate Joseph, Jessie's father
- Lakshmi Ramakrishnan as Mrs. Kulkarni, Sachin's mother
- Sriranjani as Mrs. Joseph, Jessie's mother
- Ramesh Sippy as himself
- Subbalakshmi as Jessie's grandmother
- Shyam as Jerry Thekkekuttu, Jessie's brother
- Siddhant Ghegadmal as Dhiraj
- Tony Kaatukaran as Roy Thomas
- Pradeep Kottayam as George, Jessie's uncle
- Samantha Ruth Prabhu in a cameo appearance as Samantha "Sam"
- Ashwin Kakumanu as himself

== Production ==
=== Development ===
Gautham Menon started working on Ekk Deewana Tha, the Hindi remake of his Tamil film Vinnaithaandi Varuvaayaa, in 2010, and his Telugu simultaneous version Ye Maaya Chesave, with Prateik Babbar and Amy Jackson starring (for the Hindi version). Vinnaithaandi Varuvaayaa and Ye Maaya Chesave were considered to have changed the images of their lead actor pairs Silambarasan Rajendar-Trisha Krishnan and Naga Chaitanya-Samantha respectively. Though, the Hindi remake initially had Trisha Krishnan reprising her role from the Tamil version, the actress was dropped from the project after a photo shoot and replaced by Amy Jackson, who shot to fame with the Tamil film Madrasapattinam.

Gautham Menon was trying out a 'look shoot' at the same locations where he shot Vinnaithaandi Varuvaayaa and Ye Maaya Chesave, including a popular seaside restaurant on ECR, Chennai. A source close to the director said, "This shoot was just to get the 'feel' of the film. The actual shoot will take place in Mumbai from next month." According to the sources, A R Rahman's original tunes will be retained for Ekk Deewana Tha as well, while the film also features Gautham Menon's regular technical team, consisting of art director Rajeevan and editor Anthony.

Noted poet, story and screenplay writer, Javed Akhtar recently was in Chennai, supervising the script and writing the lyrics for the film. A source close to the development said, "Javed saab and Gautham hit it off well. The lyricist's inputs will be taken into consideration as Gautham is particular that his film should not come across as a routine South Indian remake."

Amy Jackson, playing a Syrian Malabar Nasrani Christian in the film, said, "I'm very kicked about working with Gautham Menon. I've seen VTV [Vinnaithaandi Varuvaayaa] at least 15 times. Ekk Deewana Tha is a perfect launch pad for me in Bollywood. He is a perfectionist and I know he will shape my character according to the needs and tastes of the Bollywood audience. I've begun the first schedule of the film and I'm planning to hire a Hindi tutor to help me sail through it."

=== Filming ===
The shooting of the film was to start in late-2010 but Prateik Babbar was busy with the promotions of Dhobi Ghat. Finally, the shooting of the film commenced in April 2011, with the entire cast and crew of the film in Mumbai. The shooting of the film progressed in various localities in Mumbai and the Ekk Deewana Tha team went down to Kerala and began the second schedule there in May 2011. The crew later went to Chennai in June 2011 to shoot few important scenes in Amethyst, Chennai, while, some of the songs were shot in AVM Studios, Chennai. In July 2011, after the shooting of the film in Chennai was completed, the next schedule of the film was started at The Taj Mahal, Agra, while the shooting of the film was also held in Delhi. In 2011, the team moved to Goa to film the song sequences for "Hosanna" and "Phoolon Jaisi", choreographed by Flexy Stu.

Singer Chinmayi dubbed for the female lead, reprising her role from the Tamil and Telugu versions where she dubbed for Trisha and Samantha, respectively.

== Soundtrack ==
The soundtrack and film score for Ekk Deewana Tha is composed by A. R. Rahman, retaining the same tunes from Vinnaithaandi Varuvaayaa along with few additional tracks – "Kya Hai Mohabbat" (A. R. Rahman), "Jessy's Driving Me Crazy" (Sanjeev Thomas & Timmy) and three instrumental tracks – "Broken Promises" (Shreya Ghoshal), "Moments in Kerala" and "Jessy's Land". The track "Dost Hai (Girl I Loved You)" is a remixed version of its Tamil original Kannukkul Kannai. The soundtrack album consists of lyrics penned by Javed Akhtar, collaborating with Gautham Menon for the first time. The soundtrack album was released at a luxury hotel in Agra, by A. R. Rahman on 21 December 2011.

== Release ==
The film was released on 17 February 2012, in a unique way with a number of different endings. Notably, in Tamil, Vinnaithaandi Varuvaayaa had the leads part ways whereas in Ye Maaya Chesave, the lover birds unite. The mainstream ending was released across 500 screens in India, while the director's cut, with a different climax, was released in 20 select theatres across the country. The director's cut showcased a coming-of-age love story while the ending for the mass release had a conventional feel-good ending.

=== Controversies ===
A month before the film's release, a group from the Christian Secular Forum (CSF) in Mumbai strongly objected to the song "Hosanna". According to them, Hosanna is a sacred term in the Bible that is used by both Jews and Christians while praying, while in the film, the same term was used in a romantic sense. They demanded removal of the song, as well as an "apology for disrespecting the word", and threatened to take legal action against the film if the song was not edited out of the film's final cut.

To this, music director Rahman responded, "As with any film project I work on, I had spent several months researching before composing/writing all the songs for Ek Dewaana Tha [sic] and had consulted friends who are Christian in particular about the use of the word 'Hosanna' in this song. The song was a sensation when it was released in the South a couple of years ago and it went on to win all possible music awards and was well received by all communities! Therefore I am deeply concerned about the sentiments of all those who appear to be hurt by this song."

=== Critical reception ===
Ekk Deewana Tha received mixed reviews upon release. Avijit Ghosh of The Times of India gave the film 3 stars out of 5 saying, "Ekk Deewana Tha has its moments but it doesn't really put you in the mood for love." Taran Adarsh of Bollywood Hungama gave the film 2 stars out of 5, and said, "On the whole, Ekk Deewana Tha has a few sparkling moments, that's about it. However, it lacks the fizz for the spectator to go deewana!" Shubhra Gupta from The Indian Express also gave the film 2 stars out of 5, saying, "Simbu's stubbly guy-next-door, helplessly in love with the feckless Trisha was the highlight, apart from its lovely songs, of VTV [Vinnaithaandi Varuvaayaa]: where did all the passion go in Ekk Deewana Tha?" Rajeev Masand of CNN-IBN too gave the film 2 stars out of 5 saying, "This Hindi remake is a disappointing bore of a love story that tests your threshold for pain as it hobbles along indulgently for close to 2 hours and 40 minutes." Zee News gave the film 2 stars out of 5, and concluded that, "All in all, Ekk Deewana Tha is a movie that seems to have been lost in translation. However, Prateik deserves praise for his efforts." Blessy Chettiar of DNA gave the film 1.5 stars out of 5, concluding saying, "A simple and sweet story treated badly. Skip. Simple." Komal Nahta for Koimoi.com gave the film a single star out of 5, blaming the routine story, the weak screenplay and lack of feeling of empathy for the two lead characters. Preeti Arora of Rediff.com feels that Ekk Deewana Tha, Gautham Menon's Hindi remake of his hit Tamil film Vinnaithaandi Varuvaaya, lost quite a bit in translation. She gave the film 1 star out of 5. Shubha Shetty-Saha of MiD DAY too gave the film 1 star out of 5 saying, "No, the story is not really as bad as it seems. With better direction and perhaps a little more sensitivity and with a faster pace, and better actors (oops, are they too many conditions?), it might have worked." Mayank Shekhar of Hindustan Times again gave the film 1 star out of 5 saying, "We’re beyond midway through the movie: chuck chemistry, all you’re wondering is what the hell’s the story." Kaveree Bamzai of India Today too gave the film 1 star out of 5, and said, "We are supposed to feel the longing he has for Amy. We only feel the irritation. Get on with it guys you want to say. Come to the point. By the time they do you are exhausted, and want to do what Prateik says Amy's character did to his feelings-showed him the middle finger. So there." Kunal Guha of Yahoo! gave the film minus 1 rating, and said, "it is in fact the iceberg that makes this painful love story crash as we endure the burn."

=== Box office ===
The opening day at the box office saw only 5–10% occupancy in cinemas. On Saturday, the film collected just ₹7.5 million (US$78,000) nett. The film on Sunday collected ₹9 million (US$93,000) nett, taking its total first weekend collection to ₹24 million (US$250,000) nett. Its gross collection for week one stood at ₹53.1 million (US$550,000) nett.

The film was declared a flop by Box Office India.
