= Vinnaithaandi Varuvaayaa =

2010 film by Gautham Menon

Vinnaithaandi Varuvaaya
- Theatrical release poster
- Directed by: Gautham Vasudev Menon
- Written by: Gautham Vasudev Menon
- Produced by: Elred Kumar; P. Madan; J. Ganesh; Jayaraman
- Starring: Silambarasan; Trisha
- Cinematography: Manoj Paramahamsa
- Edited by: Anthony
- Music by: A. R. Rahman
- Production companies: RS Infotainment; Escape Artists Motion Pictures
- Distributed by: Red Giant Movies; Radaan Mediaworks
- Release date: 26 February 2010
- Running time: 167 minutes
- Country: India
- Language: Tamil

Vinnaithaandi Varuvaayaa (transl. Will you cross the skies for me?) is a 2010 Indian Tamil-language musical romantic drama film written and directed by Gautham Vasudev Menon, starring Silambarasan and Trisha. Jointly produced by Elred Kumar, Jayaraman, VTV Ganesh and P. Madan under the banner Escape Artists Motion Pictures and RS Infotainment, the film was distributed by Udhayanidhi Stalin's Red Giant Movies. The story was simultaneously shot in Telugu as Ye Maaya Chesave, starring Naga Chaitanya and Samantha.

Launched after a wave of publicity posters with no details about the cast and crew, Vinnaithaandi Varuvaayaa began its first schedule of filming in February 2009. Shooting continued through 2009, with the film garnering significant media interest, with schedules in Malta and the United States. Before release, it became the first Tamil project to have a music soundtrack premiere outside of India, with a successful launch at the British Academy of Film and Television Arts (BAFTAs) in London. The film features soundtrack composed by A. R. Rahman, cinematography by Manoj Paramahamsa and editing by Anthony.

Vinnaithaandi Varuvaayaa explores the complicated relationship between a Hindu Tamil boy, Karthik Sivakumar, and a Malayali Christian girl, Jessie from Alappuzha, Kerala. Karthik falls in love with Jessie only to be met by her indifference and reluctance as they belong to different religions and her strict conservative family will never consent to their union. The film is similar to 2009 American film 500 Days of Summer. The film released on 26 February 2010, along with the Telugu version to advance bookings worldwide. It was later remade in Hindi as Ekk Deewana Tha, also directed by Menon, with a different ending. A short film/sequel titled Karthik Dial Seytha Yenn, again directed by Menon with Silambarasan and Trisha reprising their roles, was released in May 2020.

== Plot ==
Karthik is a Mechanical Engineering graduate in Chennai who lacks interest in his field and instead harbors deep ambitions of becoming a filmmaker. Through a friend, he connects with a cinematographer named Ganesh, whose guidance helps him secure a job as an assistant director. Meanwhile, Karthik's Tamil Hindu family rents the ground floor of a house owned by a conservative Syrian Catholic family from Alappuzha, Kerala. The landlord's daughter, Jessie, lives upstairs with her strict family.

Karthik falls in love with Jessie the moment he sees her on the street. His initial attempts to interact with her end up frightening and angering her due to her intense fear of her authoritarian father. When Karthik formally confesses his love, Jessie rejects him. Shortly after, learning that Jessie has traveled to Kerala to visit her grandmother, Karthik and Ganesh follow her there. After searching for days, Karthik finds her and apologizes for his behavior. To protect him from her strict relatives, Jessie introduces him as a "classmate" and agrees to maintain a platonic friendship, firmly denying any romantic feelings. However, during the train journey back to Chennai, Karthik sits close to her and kisses her, stopping only when she gently slaps him. Despite her repeated rejections—rooted in their different religious backgrounds, ethnic differences, and the fact that she is a year older—Karthik remains convinced of her love. Over subsequent secret meetings, Jessie slowly realizes she has reciprocal feelings for him but tries to suppress them to avoid family conflict.

The secret relationship unravels when an altercation breaks out between Karthik and Jessie's protective brother, Jerry. Her parents discover the romance and quickly arrange her marriage to a partner of their choice. However, midway through the wedding ceremony in Kerala, Jessie refuses to exchange vows, humiliating her family. Karthik, who had traveled down to witness the wedding in secret, visits her home in the aftermath. Overjoyed by his presence, Jessie finally confesses that she has fallen deeply in love with him, and the two resume their relationship in secret.

Sometime later, Karthik travels to Goa for a demanding 45-day film shoot, leaving him largely unreachable. During his absence, the groom whom Jessie had previously rejected visits her family, reviving the intense domestic pressure regarding her marriage. Panicking, Jessie calls Karthik and begs him to elope with her immediately. Caught up in the logistics of the shoot and traveling through remote locations, Karthik asks her to wait in Chennai until he returns so they can plan properly. Hurt and overwhelmed, Jessie stops answering his calls. Sensing something is wrong, Karthik returns to Chennai one night to find her. Jessie abruptly breaks off the relationship, explaining that the constant disapproval from her parents has drained her peace of mind. She reveals she has finally surrendered to her family's wishes and agreed to marry a man of their choice. When a devastated Karthik begs her to reconsider, she tells him that the window for eloping has closed and urges him not to waste his life waiting for her. Karthik later hears that she has married and relocated to the United Kingdom.

Two years pass. Karthik meets a woman named Nandini who falls in love with him, but he turns her down, unable to move past his heartbreak. Instead, he channels his grief into writing the screenplay for his debut feature film—a direct adaptation of his tragic romance with Jessie. He casts Nandini and Naga Chaitanya as the leads, with Ganesh serving as the cinematographer.

During a production schedule for the film's climax in New York City, Jessie approaches him, revealing that her resentment toward her parents' rigidity drove her to flee to New York. She confesses that she never actually got married and is still profoundly in love with him. After spending a romantic period together exploring the city, Karthik proposes, and the two are wed.

However, this joyful reunion is abruptly revealed to be nothing more than the fictional, idealized ending of Karthik's movie, which the real-life Karthik is watching at the premiere. In reality, while shooting in New York, Jessie had spotted Karthik from a distance but chose not to approach him. She is permanently married to someone else and living a different life. She firmly implores Karthik to finally let her go, reiterating that a life built entirely on obstacles and parental estrangement is impossible. Accepting their reality, the two part ways permanently to pursue their separate destinies.

== Cast ==
- Silambarasan as Karthik Sivakumar, a Tamil Hindu and film director.
- Trisha as Jessie Thekekuthu, a Syrian Catholic Malayali girl (Voice dubbed by Chinmayi)
- VTV Ganesh as Ganesh, a cinematographer
- Babu Antony as Joseph, Jessie's father
- Kitty as Sivakumar, Karthik's father
- Uma Padmanabhan as Mrs. Sivakumar, Karthik's mother
- Ranjith Velayudhan as Jerry, Jessie's brother (Voice dubbed by Gautham Vasudev Menon)
- Lakshmi Ramakrishnan as Teresa, Jessie's mother
- Trisha Alex as Anupama, Karthik's sister
- Benito as Roy Thomas
- Subbalakshmi as Aleyamma, Jessie's grandmother
- K. S. Ravikumar as a Director
- Pradeep Kottayam as George, Jessie's uncle in Kerala
- Amit Mishra as Abraham
- Samantha in a cameo appearance as the actress Nandini (Voice dubbed by Chinmayi)
- Naga Chaitanya in a cameo appearance as himself
- Janani Iyer in a Cameo appearance as Assistant Director

== Production ==
=== Origin ===
After making a series of action films, Gautham Vasudev Menon actively chose to make an "out and out love story" at the insistence of his close associates, and marked a return to the genre for the first time since Minnale (2001). Initially titled Vennilavae Vennillavae, inspired by the title of a song from Minsara Kanavu, Menon started writing the film as a simple love story which slowly became an intense love story, as the scripting phase progressed. Stating that the film would narrate the romantic tale of two people called Karthik and Jessie over a period of almost three years, he revealed that the film would be "conversation driven" and hoped "everybody will identify with the lead pair". Menon took the script to producer Manjula Ghattamaneni, who asked him to narrate the film to her brother Mahesh Babu and the movie was a Tamil and Telugu bilingual. Menon initially felt that the film would not suit the actor, but later agreed preliminary terms to make it in Telugu titled Jessie with the actor and have A. R. Rahman as the music composer, as he was impressed with the story.

=== Development ===
Continuing from the earlier proposed theme of Vennilavae Vennillavae, Menon later chose to use the second line of the song to title his film as Vinnaithaandi Varuvaayaa, after it was suggested by the cinematographer Manoj Paramahamsa. Menon discussed a Tamil and Telugu version of the script with several actors including Dhanush, Jai and Allu Arjun who had wanted changes to be made to the climax, and described being "one week away" from starting the project with a debutant actor. But in late January 2009, Menon confirmed that he was in discussions with Silambarasan and Trisha to portray the lead roles from the script. After finding out that Silambarasan had dates available as a result of the delay in the shoot of Vignesh Shivan's Podaa Podi (2012), Menon chose to halt the production of his ongoing Chennaiyil Oru Mazhaikaalam and finalise pre-production work on Vinnaithaandi Varuvaayaa.

Menon added that Silambarasan was "apt for this kind of a film" and was "ready to experiment and try something different" from his usual film roles, prompting him to agree to star in the film. As Menon was working with Trisha on Chennaiyil Oru Mazhaikaalam, he chose to use her dates for Vinnaithaandi Varuvaayaa instead. To pique interest before the official announcement, the makers released a series of film posters featuring Silambarasan and Trisha inspired from previous classic Tamil films. The team used posters inspired from Geethanjali (1989), Minsara Kanavu (1997), Dil Se (1998), Alaipayuthey (2000) and Kaakha Kaakha (2003). Other members of the technical crew included Menon's regular collaborators editor Anthony, art director Rajeevan, costume designer Nalini Sriram and lyricist Thamarai. The project was jointly produced by Escape Artists Motion Pictures and RS Infotainment, with Elred Kumar, Ganesh, Madhan as producers.

=== Casting ===
For the role of a mentor to Karthik's character, Menon first approached Vivek, but he turned down the opportunity. Later, one of the film's producers, Ganesh, was cast in the role, in what later became his breakthrough film as an actor. Chennai-based model Janani Iyer was recruited to portray the role of an assistant director who falls in love with Karthik, but the role was later reshot with Samantha, who worked as the lead actress of the film's Telugu version. Janani Iyer was subsequently seen in the background of several scenes where Karthik is shown to be a part of a film production team. Ashwin Kakumanu also auditioned for the role of Jessy's brother in the film and was selected, but eventually did not feature after having a clash of dates. Chinmayi Sripada dubbed Trisha's voice.

=== Filming ===
Scenes were shot in the lakes of Alappuzha during April 2009 for a month, with the houseboats doubling up as caravans.

In May, the team moved to Malta to film the song sequences for "Hosanna" and "Omana Penne", choreographed by Flexy Stu. For the particular song sequences in the film, Menon wanted "churches, water and caves" and convinced the producers to finance a trip to Malta, and in the process, the team became the first South Indian film to shoot in the country. Scenes were shot in places including Valletta, Mdina, Gozo and Comino, as well as in lanes, alleys, eight churches and during the time of a village feast. The makers brought along a crew of twenty-six people to Malta, with ten local workers also helping on the production. The shoot lasted ten days and cost approximately €90,000.

In October 2009, the team flew to the United States to complete the final filming schedule. Scenes were shot throughout locations in Manhattan and New Jersey, with particular shots filmed at Brooklyn Bridge, Central Park and Times Square. But 70% of filming took place in Chennai and Hyderabad as well.

== Soundtrack ==
The soundtrack was composed by A. R. Rahman. Vinnaithaandi Varuvaayaa marked the beginning of a collaboration between Rahman, Silambarasan and Gautham Vasudev Menon.

The world premiere was held at BAFTA in London on 25 December 2009 and later it was relaunched in Chennai on 6 January 2010. The album consists of seven tracks. The audio received good pre-release response and was marked as No. 1 in Asia, in advance bookings. It retained the same tunes for the Telugu version of the film, Ye Maaya Chesave and the Hindi remake, Ekk Deewana Tha.

== Release ==
The film was given a U/A certificate by the Indian Film Certification Board because, according to Menon, they believed "the love in the film was too intense for a child to understand".

== Reception ==
=== Critical reception ===
Sify said that it was "Very good" further citing "The film is a must watch for those who cares for cinema of sense and substance. It stresses the fact that Tamil cinema has to break the mould if it aims to grab eyeballs. Gautham Menon has crafted a movie that will stay in our hearts for a long, long time."

Pavithra Srinivasan of Rediff.com called the film a "Must watch" further citing "The best part about VTV is that it revolves around people, rather than events. It's like putting a camera into the intimate, everyday life of two people and following them on their adventures. The characters go through a whirlwind of emotions, laugh and cry, and take you along with them." However, the reviewer points out certain drawbacks in the film citing "On the minus side, VTV suffers from the same defect as Vaaranam Aayiram: the second half lags in pace. The dialogues and confrontations are repetitive. There's a would-be love-track that seems unnecessary before the story takes off again."

Malathi Rangarajan from The Hindu said "Twenty two-year old Karthik's true-to-life overtures, reactions and recklessness are just as you would expect from a director of Menon's calibre. It is his authentic depiction of Jessie's confusion that's all the more amazing – Menon's complete understanding of a woman's psyche bowls you over! So do the young lovers!" Aravindan D. I. of nowrunning.com gave the film three stars out of five and said "Gautam Vasudev Menon's "Vinnaithaandi Varuvaaya" is a clean romantic story without any deviation or sub-plots."

Chennai Online said, Vinnaithaandi Varuvaayaa (VTV) is an excellent effort on the part of Gautam Vasudev Menon in narrating a clean romantic story without any deviation from the plot" and further cited "As is Menon’s forte, the dialogues and the execution of scenes are top-notch. The joys of falling of love and the pangs of separation have been portrayed well. The way Simbu nurtures his love for Jesse and the positive but ambiguous reactions from Trisha to his overtures are very nice indeed."

=== Box office ===
Vinnaithaandi Varuvaayaa took a grand opening, grossing around ₹9.7 million (equivalent to ₹24 million or US$250,000 in 2026) in its first three days in Chennai.

== Accolades ==
Edison Awards

- Best Actor – Silambarasan Rajendar
- Best Actress – Trisha Krishnan
- Best Male Singer – Vijay Prakash

Vikatan Awards

- Best Music Director – A. R. Rahman
- Best Male Singer – Benny Dayal
- Best Female Singer – Shreya Ghoshal
- Best Lyricist – Thamarai
- Best Costume Designer – Nalini Sriram

Vijay Music Awards

- Vijay Music awards – A. R. Rahman
- Vijay Music awards – Vijay Prakash
- Vijay Music awards – Shreya Ghoshal
- Vijay Music awards – Vinnaithaandi Varuvaayaa

Vijay Awards

- Best Music Director – A. R. Rahman
- Best Male Playback Singer – Vijay Prakash
- Best Female Playback Singer – Shreya Ghoshal
- Favorite Heroine – Trisha Krishnan

Filmfare Awards South

- Best Music Director – A. R. Rahman
- Best Lyricist – Thamarai (for "Mannipaaya")
- Best Cinematographer – Manoj Paramahamsa

== Sequel ==
In February 2018, Menon announced a sequel titled Ondraga, intended to be a road and hyperlink film which would focus on Karthik and his best friends from college travelling to the United States to attend a wedding ten years after the events of the first film. However, the project did not materialise. Instead, a short film sequel, titled Karthik Dial Seytha Yenn starring Silambarasan and Trisha reprising their roles, was released on 21 May 2020.

== Legacy ==
The dialogue "Inga Enna Solludhu" spoken by VTV Ganesh inspired a 2014 film of same name which was produced and acted by Ganesh. The sequence when Karthik (Silambarasan) leans on the gate when he is in love with Jessie in the song "Hosanna" is parodied by Santhanam in Neethaane En Ponvasantham (2012). The scene where Karthik proposes to Jessie is spoofed in Kannum Kannum Kollaiyadithaal (2020). In the film, Pratap (played by Gautham Vasudev Menon) gifts Jessie (played by Ritu Varma) a necklace. The scenes and dialogues were parodied in Tamizh Padam 2 (2018). The song "Omana Penne" inspired a film of the same name, but being titled as Oh Manapenne! (transl. Oh Bride).
