= Jab Tak Hai Jaan (soundtrack) =

Soundtrack album by A. R. Rahman
- Released: 10 October 2012
- Recorded: 2011–2012; Panchathan Record Inn and AM Studios, Chennai; Panchathan Hollywood Studio, Los Angeles; YRF Studios, Mumbai; Nirvana Studios, Mumbai
- Genre: Feature film soundtrack
- Length: 37:45
- Languages: Hindi; Punjabi
- Label: YRF Music
- Producer: A. R. Rahman

A. R. Rahman chronology
People Like Us (2012)	Jab Tak Hai Jaan (2012)	Kadal (2012)

Jab Tak Hai Jaan is the soundtrack album, composed by A. R. Rahman, to the 2012 Hindi film of the same name, directed by Yash Chopra that stars Shah Rukh Khan, Katrina Kaif and Anushka Sharma. The film was produced by Aditya Chopra under his banner Yash Raj Films. The album has nine tracks and was released on 10 October 2012 on the firm's official record label YRF Music.

== Development ==
The soundtrack was the first collaboration between Chopra, Rahman and the lyricist Gulzar. In May 2011, Rahman was signed to compose the music as well as the background score of the film. The first song of the soundtrack was completed in December 2011. In February 2012, Rahman said in an interview with The Times of India that he had completed three songs for the film. Rahman summarised the soundtrack album, saying, "It's a combination. They wanted to do my kind of songs at the same time they wanted the old charm and soul of music that Indian audience would love and which I wanted to do for a long time."

"Yashji saw one of my concerts in London, we invited him. He felt that I should give music in his film. It was kind enough of him to call me. It is a great honour for me. I had not worked with him and now my whole thing...meaning career wise is complete. I am very happy to have worked with him. We had great time, it was a great experience. And he (Yash Chopra) seemed happy. I hope people feel the same."

— A.R. Rahman on his first and last collaboration with Yash Chopra.

=== Overview ===
The Punjabi lyrical song "Challa" was filmed on the lead character Samar Anand (played by Shahrukh Khan). The song was mainly shot in Trafalgar Square and at Canary Wharf and the Hungerford Bridge and Golden Jubilee Bridges, in London. At the promotion of the film he said, "I love 'Challa' – its a Punjabi, Sufi kind of song. Doing it was different for me, to play the guitar in the way its supposed to be strummed." The song also had Katrina Kaif alongside Khan. The song portrays the daily routine life of the character Samar who lives in London. The lead actor learnt the guitar chords of the song to seem authentic while strumming it. Released as a single track prior to the album launch, it met overwhelming positive reviews on the Internet, especially on YouTube. Several media reports claimed that the opening notes and guitar strummings of the song were loosely inspired by Eagle-Eye Cherry's song "Save Tonight". However, these allegation were denied by the singer, Rabbi Shergill, claiming that the two songs only shared acoustic guitar, bass and tempo, and nonsensical insinuations had come up.

The song "Saans" was titled "The Breath of Love" by Khan when it opened as video promotion on the day of music launch. Rahman said that, initially, the patch version of the song was composed with dummy lyrics. He added that the song highlights traditional beats but has an edge to it. According to the plot of the film, the song needed tautness that is exemplified by the tensed violins. In the film, Samar helps Meera (played by Katrina Kaif) to revive her maternal bondings so she knows more on love through her mother. This makes Meera reciprocate her feelings to Samar, expressed as the song "Saans". The reprise version of the song occurs when Meera and Samar meet after ten years.

"Ishq Dance" and "Ishq Shava" are dance-oriented numbers sequentially filmed, the former with the leading duo and nearly 80 freestyle dancers in an underground club, and the latter on board a barge on the River Thames, essentially keeping Tower Bridge as the backdrop during the night. The composer said that instead of a trance or dubstep genre, he fused tribal and contemporary with acoustics. The song also involves more strummed Spanish guitars in its preludes.

"Heer Heer" is a solo performance in the film by Meera. Initially the song was recorded as patch, to be used only in the film. However, Gulzar insisted Rahman record it as a complete track after adding more lines to the folk poetry. In the film, Meera learns Punjabi and the song through Samar. She performs the song to impress her father and show that, though in London, her roots are still in her Indian culture. On the counterpart, the song also relates the heartfelt situation between her and Samar. The straight Punjabi lyrical track implicitly refers to the folklores of Mirza Sahiban and Heer Ranjha where the lyricist claimed to put imagery in several lines of the song.

"Jiya Re" is sung by the character Akira (played by Anushka Sharma) in the song. Gulzar said that the song was character-oriented. The song was shot in the landscapes of Ladakh and Kashmir. Akira's further documentary filming journey with Samar began after this song. The singer, Neeti Mohan, made her debut as a playback singer with this song in the soundtrack.

Often regarded as the swan song, the title track, "Jab Tak Hai Jaan" marks the union of the lead characters and was planned to be shot with a large budget in the Swiss Alps. The death of the director led the cancellation of filming and the song was used in the closing credits.

The poem "Jab Tak Hai Jaan", written by Aditya Chopra and recited by Shahrukh Khan, was used in the opening credits of the film. Several reports said that the theatrical trailer that incorporated this song was reminiscent of the song "Apertura" in the film The Motorcycle Diaries, especially the use of a charango in the music.

== Marketing ==
On 12 September 2012, when the film opened, part of the lyrics of the poem "Jab Tak Hai Jaan", written by Aditya Chopra, were released before the launch of the soundtrack. On 27 September 2012, the film director's 80th birthday, Shahrukh Khan paid homage to Chopra in an event connected to his film where the song "Challa" was deciphered. Chopra said it was his favourite track from the album and even recited a few lines of it. The video promotion of the first song of the soundtrack album, "Challa", sung by Rabbi Shergill in Punjabi, was released on 1 October 2012 and had over a million views within a day of its release. The first trailer of the film also used the instrumental part of "Challa". The making of "Challa" was released officially on 5 October 2012. Later, it was also made available as a complete track for digital download. A small portion of the song "Heer Heer", sung in Punjabi by Harshdeep Kaur, was leaked on the Internet on 7 October 2012. The video promotion of the second song, "Saans", was launched on 9 October 2012 in an event held in the Ball Room, Taj Land Ends, Bandra, Mumbai. The romantic number was launched in the presence of Khan and Katrina Kaif, web conferencing the event over Skype where Khan named the song "The Breathe of Love". The event was supposed to have included the actress but her shooting schedules for Dhoom 3 in Chicago prevented such an appearance. The video promotion of "Jiya Re", highlighting Anushka Sharma and featuring Khan, was released on 17 October 2012. The complete soundtrack album was released on 10 October 2012 on YRF Music. Video teasers of "Ishq Shava" were released on 26 October 2012 and "Heer Heer" on 6 November 2012.

== Critical response ==
The soundtrack of Jab Tak Hai Jaan received generally positive critical reception. In a poll conducted by Indiatimes, the song "Saans" won the title of "Most Romantic Song of the year 2012".

Anand Vaishnav of Indiatimes praised the album and wrote, "Jab Tak Hai Jaan's score may not be the game-changer Rahman fans would have expected, but it's got its heart in the right place. And is a welcome break from all the noise (in the name of experimentation) that one is subjected to on the music-charts." DJ Munks of BizAsia Showbiz gave it 8 out of 10 stars and said, "The album is inventive and does not reflect a typical sound heard in Rahman’s music but has clear signs of ownership of Chopra, clearly indicating he had a major influence on it. The album keeps away for popular commercial music but creates a unique niche for itself with genuine hard work and talent reflecting in the songs." Joginder Tuteja of Bollywood Hungama gave it 3.5 out of 5 stars and wrote, "Jab Tak Jai Jaan turns out to be a mixed bag and while none of the songs is the kind that one turns away from (it can't be imagined that way in any case, given the team involved), there are only a few which make you come back to them." Vipin of Music Aloud noted, "Jab Tak Hai Jaan. Has its ARR-special moments, but for a film touted as Yash Chopra’s 50th year special and his first venture with A. R. Rahman (along with Gulzar, that too!), the soundtrack is underwhelming." Devesh Sharma of Filmfare thought that the album was appealing even though it was not vintage Rahman. Anand Holla of The Times of India wrote, "Though not as free-spirited as Rockstar, Jab Tak Hai Jaan is engaging; an adorable, even if somewhat syrupy, soundtrack in its own love-struck space." Sukanya Verma of Rediff wrote, "Save for a few inspiring notes, even a die-hard Rahman fan will admit to feeling underwhelmed with what Jab Tak Hai Jaan has to offer."

After the second day of release, the album reached number one on the Top 10 World Albums chart on iTunes, making it the third Indian album to achieve this feat after Enthiran and Rockstar. Notably, all three were composed by Rahman.

== Track listing ==
The track list of the album was first revealed on 8 October 2012.

Track listing
No.	Title	Lyrics	Singer(s)	Length
1.	"Challa"	Gulzar	Rabbi Shergill	05:18
2.	"Saans"	Gulzar	Mohit Chauhan and Shreya Ghoshal	05:24
3.	"Ishq Shava"	Gulzar	Raghav Mathur and Shilpa Rao	04:30
4.	"Heer"	Gulzar	Harshdeep Kaur and Shreya Ghoshal	05:12
5.	"Jiya Re"	Gulzar	Neeti Mohan	05:16
6.	"Jab Tak Hai Jaan"	Gulzar	Javed Ali and Shaktisree Gopalan	03:49
7.	"Saans" (Reprise)	Gulzar	Shreya Ghoshal	02:06
8.	"Ishq Dance"	—	Instrumental	03:31
9.	"Jab Tak Hai Jaan" (Poem)	Aditya Chopra	Shahrukh Khan	02:15
Total length:				37:22

Jab Tak Hai Jaan (Deleted Scenes)
No.	Title	Lyrics	Singer(s)	Length
1.	"Tonight I'm Gonna Dance"	Lady Kash and Krissy	Lady Kash and Krissy	00:50

== Awards ==
Award	Date	Category	Recipient	Result	Reference
Bollywood Cosmopolitan Awards	10 December 2012	Song of the Year	Challa	Won	
Bollywood Cosmopolitan Awards	10 December 2012	Best Playback Singer – Male	Rabbi Shergill for "Challa"	Won	
Bollywood Cosmopolitan Awards	10 December 2012	Best Lyrics	Gulzar	Won	
Bollywood Cosmopolitan Awards	10 December 2012	Most Popular Music Overseas	A. R. Rahman	Won	
BIG Star Entertainment Awards	17 December 2012	Most Entertaining Singer – Female	Shreya Ghoshal for "Saans"	Won	
Zee Cine Awards	7 January 2013	Best Playback Singer – Female	Shreya Ghoshal for "Saans"	Won	
Zee Cine Awards	7 January 2013	Best Music	A. R. Rahman	Nominated	
Zee Cine Awards	7 January 2013	Best Playback Singer – Male	Rabbi Shergill for "Challa"	Nominated	
Zee Cine Awards	7 January 2013	Best Playback Singer – Female	Neeti Mohan for "Jiya Re"	Nominated	
Zee Cine Awards	7 January 2013	Best Lyrics	Gulzar for "Saans"	Nominated	
Colors Screen Awards	12 January 2013	Best Playback Singer – Female	Neeti Mohan for "Jiya Re"	Nominated	
Colors Screen Awards	12 January 2013	Best Lyrics	Gulzar for "Saans"	Nominated	
Filmfare Awards	20 January 2013	Best Lyrics	Gulzar for "Challa"	Won	
Filmfare Awards	20 January 2013	RD Burman Award – New Music Talent	Neeti Mohan for "Jiya Re"	Won	
Filmfare Awards	20 January 2013	Best Playback Singer – Male	Rabbi Shergill for "Challa"	Nominated	
Filmfare Awards	20 January 2013	Best Playback Singer – Female	Neeti Mohan for "Jiya Re"	Nominated	
Filmfare Awards	20 January 2013	Best Playback Singer – Female	Shreya Ghoshal for "Saans"	Nominated	
Filmfare Awards	20 January 2013	Best Lyrics	Gulzar for "Saans"	Nominated	
Star Guild Awards	16 February 2013	Best Music	A. R. Rahman	Nominated	
Star Guild Awards	16 February 2013	Best Female Singer	Shreya Ghoshal for "Saans"	Nominated	
Star Guild Awards	16 February 2013	Best Lyrics	Gulzar for "Saans"	Nominated	
Times of India Film Awards	6 April 2013	Best Lyrics	Gulzar for "Saans"	Won	
IIFA Awards	6 July 2013	Best Music Director	A. R. Rahman	Nominated	
IIFA Awards	6 July 2013	Best Lyrics	Gulzar for "Saans"	Nominated	

== Album credits ==
- Programmers: Hentry Kuruvilla & T. R. Krishna Chetan
- Sound engineers:

At Panchathan Record Inn, Chennai: Suresh Permal, Srinidhi Venkatesh, Hentry Kuruvilla, T. R. Krishna Chetan, P.A. Deepak, Jerry Vincent. R. Nitish Kumar
At AM Studios, Chennai: S. Sivakumar, Kannan Ganpat, Pradeep
At Panchathan Hollywood Studio, Los Angeles:: Tony Joy
At YRF Studios, Mumbai: Shantanu Hudlikar, Abhishek Khandelwal, Sarit Chatterjee
At Nirvana Studios, Mumbai: Abhinav Verma

- Mixing: Shantanu Hudlikar, R. Nitish Kumar and T. R. Krishna Chetan
- Mastering: Chris Athens at Chris Athens Masters

"Challa Tah main"

- Drums: Ranjit Barot
- Percussion: Faizan Hussain, Nishad Chandra
- Guitars: Keba Jeremiah
- Bass: Keith Peters

"Saans"

- Flute: Naveen Kumar

"Ishq Shava"

- Guitars: Joel Shearer
- Oud, mandolin, saz: Tapas Roy

"Jiya Re"

- Guitars: Chandresh Kudwa
- Bass: Keith Peters

"Heer"

- Guitars: Keba Jeremiah

"Saans (Reprise)"

- Percussion: Sanket Naik, Darshan Doshi, Arun Solanki

"Jab Tak Hai Jaan"

- Dholak: T. Raja, Y. P. Prasad, M. Lakshmi Narayanan
- Flute: Navin Iyer, Kiran Kumar

"Ishq Dance"

- Drums: Ranjit Barot
- Percussion: Faizan Hussain, Nishad Chandra
- Backing vocals: Nueman Pinto, Anusha Mani, Shweta Pandit, Vivienne Pocha, Crystal Sequeira, Samantha Edwards, Francois Castellino, Rishikesh Kamerkar, Rajiv Sundaresan
- Kids Chorus vocal arrangement on "Challa": "The Gleehive" conducted by Celeste Lourdes Cordo, vocals produced by Clinton Cerejo
- Strings: The Chennai Strings Orchestra, conducted By V. J. Srinivasamurthy
- Vocal supervisors: V. J. Srinivasamurthy, Srinivas Doraisami & Srinidhi Venkatesh
- Music co-ordinators: Noell James, Vijay Mohan Iyer
- Musicians' fixer: R. Samidurai
