= 61st Filmfare Awards South =

Award ceremony for South Indian films

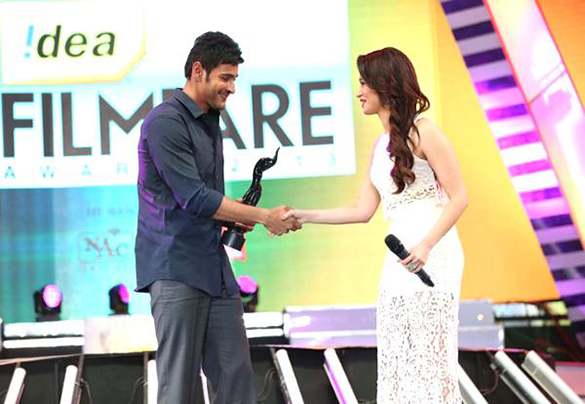
- Mahesh Babu receiving Best Actor – Telugu Award at the Award distribution function from Tamannaah for his performance in the film Seethamma Vakitlo Sirimalle Chettu
- Date: 12 July 2014
- Site: Chennai, Tamil Nadu, India
- Hosted by: Rahul Ravindran; Chinmayi
- Produced by: Idea Cellular

Highlights
- Best Picture: Myna (Kannada); Drishyam (Malayalam); Thanga Meenkal (Tamil); Attarintiki Daredi (Telugu)
- Most awards: Atharintiki Daaredi (four; Telugu); Kadal (four; Tamil)
- Most nominations: Atharintiki Daaredi (nine, Telugu); Bhajarangi (nine; Kannada); Paradesi (nine; Tamil); Shravani Subramanya (nine; Kannada)

The 61st Filmfare Awards South ceremony honouring the winners and nominees of the best of South Indian cinema in 2013 was an event held on 12 July 2014 at the Nehru Indoor Stadium, Chennai.

== Awards and nominees ==
=== Main awards ===
The winners are listed first, highlighted in boldface.

==== Kannada cinema ====
| Best Film | Best Director |
|---|---|
| **Myna**; Bhajarangi; Bulbul; Shravani Subramanya; Simple Agi Ondh Love Story | **Pawan Kumar – Lucia**; Harsha – Bhajarangi; M. D. Sridhar – Bulbul; Nagashekar– Myna; Suni – Simple Agi Ondh Love Story |
| Best Actor | Best Actress |
| **Prem Kumar – Charminar**; Ganesh – Shravani Subramanya; Shivarajkumar – Bhajarangi; Sudeep – Bachchan; Yash – Googly | **Amulya – Shravani Subramanya**; Aindrita Ray – Bhajarangi; Meghana Gaonkar – Charminar; Rachita Ram – Bulbul; Shwetha Srivatsav – Simple Agi Ondh Love Story |
| Best Supporting Actor | Best Supporting Actress |
| **Achyuth Kumar – Lucia**; Ambareesh – Bulbul; Rangayana Raghu – Jayammana Maga; Sai Kumar – Brindavana; Sharath Lohitashwa – Kaddipudi | **Kalyani Raju – Jayammana Maga**; Milana Nagaraj – Brindavana; Parul Yadav – Bachchan; Rukmini Vijayakumar – Bhajarangi; Tara – Shravani Subramanya |
| Best Music Director | Best Lyricist |
| **Arjun Janya – Bhajarangi**; B. J. Bharath – Simple Agi Ondh Love Story; Jassie Gift – Myna; Joshua Sridhar – Googly; V. Harikrishna – Shravani Subramanya | **Siddu Kodipura – "Baanalli Badalaago" from Simple Agi Ondh Love Story**; Jayanth Kaikini – "Jiya Teri" from Bhajarangi; Kaviraj – "Modala Maleyante" from Myna; M. Krishne Gowda – "Aakal Benne" from Shravani Subramanya; V. Nagendra Prasad – "Kannalle Kannittu" from Shravani Subramanya |
| Best Playback Singer – Male | Best Playback Singer – Female |
| **Poornachandra Tejaswi – "Thinbedakammi" from Lucia**; Shaan – "Kannalle Kannittu" from Shravani Subramanya; Shankar Mahadevan – "Sri Anjaneyam" from Bhajarangi; Sonu Nigam – "Baanalli Badalaago" from Simple Agi Ondh Love Story; Vijay Prakash – "Khaali Quarter" from Victory | **Sowmya Raoh – "Karagida Baaninalli" from Simple Agi Ondh Love Story**; Anuradha Bhat – "Sri Krishna" from Bhajarangi; Manjula Gururaj – "Aakal Benne" from Shravani Subramanya; Shachina Heggar – "Hedarabyadri" from Kaddipudi; Shreya Ghoshal – "Modala Maleyante" from Myna |

==== Malayalam cinema ====
| Best Film | Best Director |
|---|---|
| **Drishyam**; Amen; Artist; Celluloid; Left Right Left | **Shyamaprasad – Artist**; Jeethu Joseph – Drishyam; Joy Mathew – Shutter; Kamal – Celluloid; Lijo Jose Pellissery – Amen |
| Best Actor | Best Actress |
| **Fahadh Faasil – North 24 Kaatham**; Indrajith Sukumaran – Left Right Left; Jayaram – Nadan; Mohanlal – Drishyam; Prithviraj Sukumaran – Celluloid | **Ann Augustine – Artist**; Mamta Mohandas – Celluloid; Meena – Drishyam; Shobhana – Thira; Shweta Menon – Kalimannu |
| Best Supporting Actor | Best Supporting Actress |
| **Murali Gopy – Left Right Left**; Indrajith Sukumaran – Amen; Mukesh – English: An Autumn in London; Siddique – Drishyam; Suraj Venjaramoodu – God for Sale | **Asha Sarath – Drishyam**; Bindu Panicker – Pullipulikalum Aattinkuttiyum; Geetha – Zachariayude Garbhinikal; Lena – Left Right Left; Sanusha – Zachariayude Garbhinikal |
| Best Music Director | Best Lyricist |
| **M. Jayachandran – Celluloid**; Afsal Yusuf – God for Sale; Bijibal – Artist; Ousepachan – Nadan; Prashanth Pillai – Amen | **Madhu Vasudevan – "Ottakku Padunna" from Nadan**; ONV Kurup – "Shalabhamai" from Kalimannu; Prabha Varma – "Ethu Sundara" from Nadan; P. S. Rafeeque – "Ee Solomanum" from Amen; Rafeeq Ahmed – "Kaatte Kaatte" from Celluloid |
| Best Playback Singer – Male | Best Playback Singer – Female |
| **Vijay Yesudas – "Thirayum Theeravum" from Memories**; G. Sreeram – "Kaatte Kaatte" from Celluloid; Haricharan – "Mazhaye" from Pattam Pole; Najim Arshad – "Ethu Sundara" from Nadan | **Vaikom Vijayalakshmi – "Ottakku Padunna" from Nadan**; Anuradha Sriram – "Vadakkini Poomughathu" from Ayal; Mridula Warrier – "Laalee Laalee" from Kalimannu; Shreya Ghoshal – "Shalabhamayi" from Kalimannu; Sithara – "Ennundodee" from Celluloid |

==== Tamil cinema ====
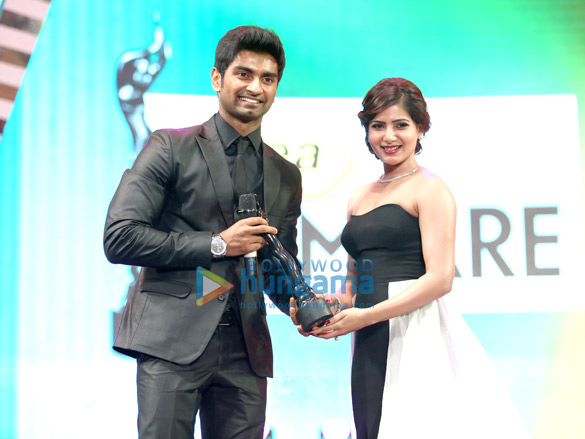
Atharvaa receiving Best Actor – Tamil Award at the Event for his performance in the film Paradesi (2013)

| Best Film | Best Director |
|---|---|
| **Thanga Meenkal**; Haridas; Paradesi; Singam II; Thalaimuraigal; Vishwaroopam | **Bala – Paradesi**; Balu Mahendra – Thalaimuraigal; G. N. R. Kumaravelan – Haridas; Hari – Singam II; Kamal Haasan – Vishwaroopam; Ram – Thanga Meenkal |
| Best Actor | Best Actress |
| **Adharvaa – Paradesi**; Ajith Kumar – Arrambam; Dhanush – Maryan; Kamal Haasan – Vishwaroopam; Kishore – Haridas; Suriya – Singam II | **Nayanthara – Raja Rani**; Parvathy – Maryan; Pooja Umashankar – Vidiyum Munn; Sneha – Haridas; Trisha – Endrendrum Punnagai; Vedhicka – Paradesi |
| Best Supporting Actor | Best Supporting Actress |
| **Sathyaraj – Raja Rani**; Arya – Arrambam; Jai – Raja Rani; Jerry – Paradesi; Rahman – Singam II | **Dhansika – Paradesi**; Nandita Swetha – Ethir Neechal; Nazriya Nazim – Raja Rani; Padmapriya Janakiraman – Thanga Meenkal; Taapsee Pannu – Arrambam |
| Best Music Director | Best Lyricist |
| **A. R. Rahman – Kadal**; A. R. Rahman – Maryan; Anirudh Ravichander – Ethir Neechal; Anirudh Ravichander – Vanakkam Chennai; D. Imman – Varuthapadatha Valibar Sangam; G. V. Prakash Kumar – Paradesi | **Na. Muthukumar – "Aananda Yaazhai" from Thanga Meenkal**; Madhan Karky – "Anbin Vaasaley" from Kadal; Na. Muthukumar – "Yaaro Ivan" from Udhayam NH4; Vairamuthu – "Chithirai Nila" from Kadal; Vairamuthu – "Sengaade" from Paradesi |
| Best Playback Singer – Male | Best Playback Singer – Female |
| **Sriram Parthasarathy – "Aananda Yaazhai" from Thanga Meenkal**; A. R. Rahman – "Elay Keechan" from Kadal; Abhay Jodhpurkar – "Moongil Thottam" from Kadal; G. V. Prakash – "Yaar Indha" from Thalaivaa; Yuvan Shankar Raja – "Kadal Rasa Naan" from Maryan | **Sakthisree Gopalan – "Nenjukulley" from Kadal**; Saindhavi – "Yaar Indha" from Thalaivaa; Saindhavi – "Yaaro Ivan" from Udhayam NH4; Suchitra – "Ailasa Ailasa" from Vanakkam Chennai; Vandana Srinivasan – "Avatha Paiyya" from Paradesi |

==== Telugu cinema ====
| Best Film | Best Director |
|---|---|
| **Atharintiki Daaredi**; Gunde Jaari Gallanthayyinde; Mirchi; Seethamma Vakitlo Sirimalle Chettu; Uyyala Jampala | **Trivikram Srinivas- Atharintiki Daaredi**; Koratala Siva – Mirchi; Srikanth Addala – Seethamma Vakitlo Sirimalle Chettu; Vijaykumar Konda – Gunde Jaari Gallanthayyinde; Virinchi Varma – Uyyala Jampala |
| Best Actor | Best Actress |
| **Mahesh Babu – Seethamma Vakitlo Sirimalle Chettu**; Nitin – Gunde Jaari Gallanthayyinde; Pawan Kalyan – Atharintiki Daaredi; Prabhas – Mirchi; Ram Charan Teja – Nayak | **Nithya Menen – Gunde Jaari Gallanthayyinde**; Anushka Shetty – Mirchi; Nanditha Raj – Prema Katha Chitram; Rakul Preet Singh – Venkatadri Express; Samantha Ruth Prabhu – Attarintiki Daredi |
| Best Supporting Actor | Best Supporting Actress |
| **Sunil – Tadakha**; Brahmaji – Venkatadri Express; Prakash Raj – Seethamma Vakitlo Sirimalle Chettu; Sundeep Kishan – Gundello Godari; Venkatesh – Masala | **Lakshmi Manchu – Gundello Godari**; Anjali – Seethamma Vakitlo Sirimalle Chettu; Nadiya Moidu – Atharintiki Daaredi; Pranitha Subhash – Atharintiki Daaredi; Punarnavi – Uyyala Jampala |
| Best Music Director | Best Lyricist |
| **Devi Sri Prasad – Atharintiki Daaredi**; Anoop Rubens – Gunde Jaari Gallanthayyinde; Devi Sri Prasad – Mirchi; M. R. Sunny – Swamy Ra Ra; Mickey J. Meyer – Seethamma Vakitlo Sirimalle Chettu | **Sri Mani – "Aaradugula Bulletu" from Atharintiki Daaredi**; Anantha Sreeram – "Jabilli Nuvve Cheppamma" from Ramayya Vasthavayya; Chandrabose – "Gundello Godari" from Gundello Godari; Ramajogayya Sastry – "Pandagala Digivachavu" from Mirchi; Vishwa – "Diamond Girl" from Baadshah |
| Best Playback Singer – Male | Best Playback Singer – Female |
| **Kailash Kher – "Pandagala Digivachavu" from Mirchi**; Daler Mehndi – "Banthi Poola Janaki" from Baadshah; Ranjith – "Jabilli Nuvve Cheppamma" from Ramayya Vasthavayya; Shankar Mahadevan – "Bapu Gari Bomma" from Atharintiki Daaredi; Suchith Suresan – "Meenakshi Meenakshi" from Masala | **K. S. Chithra – "Seethamma Vakitlo" from Seethamma Vakitlo Sirimalle Chettu**; Chinnaponnu – "Mirchi" from Mirchi; Geetha Madhuri – "Vechhani Vayasu" from Gundello Godari; Indu Nagaraj – "Pyar Mein Padipoya" from Potugadu; Shreya Ghoshal – "Hey Nayak" from Nayak |

=== Technical Awards ===
Best Choreography
- **Sekhar – "Top Lessi Poddi" (Iddarammayilatho)**
Best Cinematographer
- **Rajeev Menon – Kadal**

=== Special awards ===
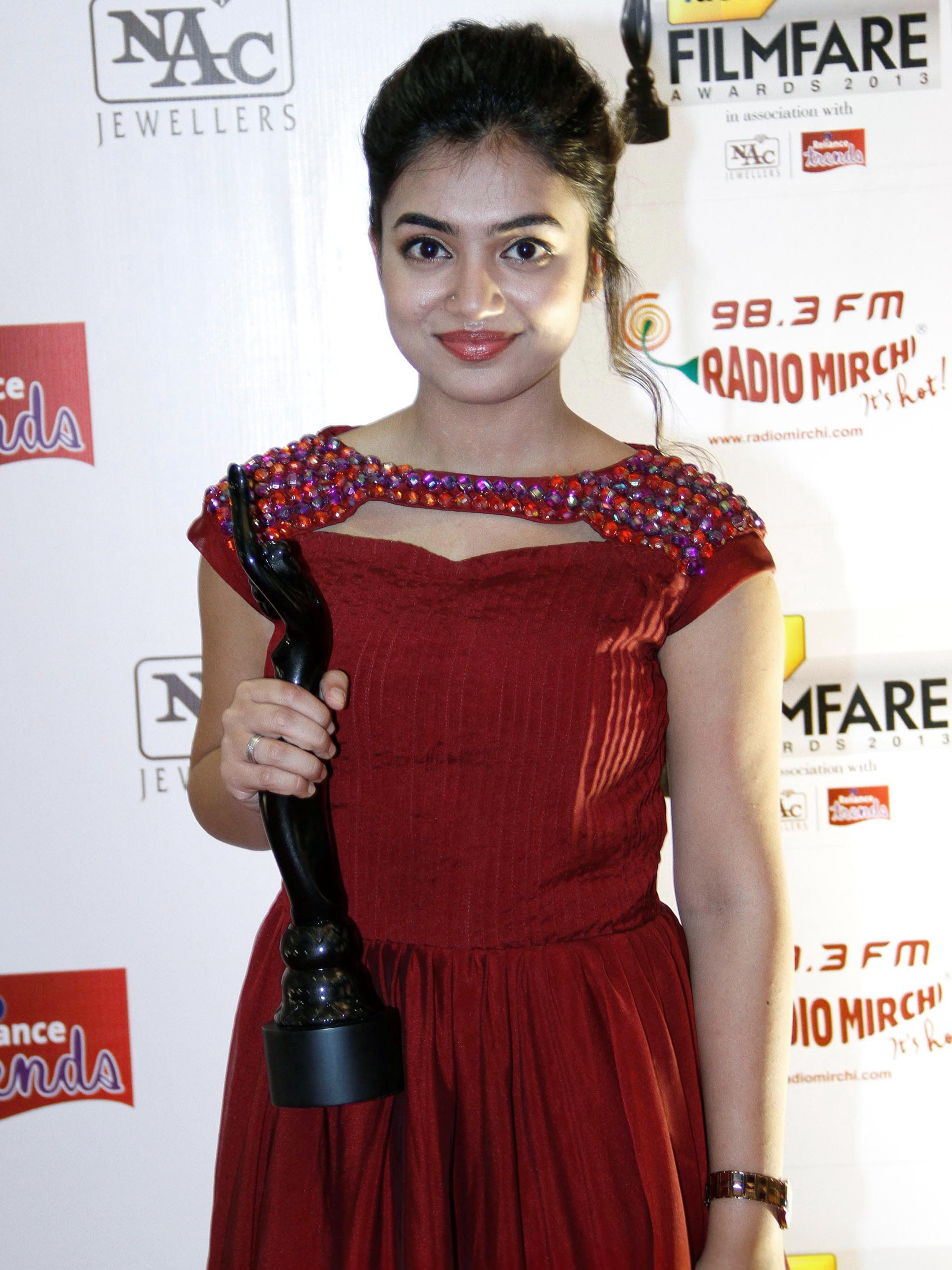
Nazriya Nazim, with her Best Female Debut trophy at the 61st Filmfare Awards South in 2014

Lifetime Achievement
- **Balu Mahendra** (Cinematographer, director)
- **Jayabharathi** (Actress)
Critics Best Actor
- **Prithiviraj (Malayalam) for** **Celluloid**
- **Dhanush (Tamil) for** **Maryan**
Best Male Debut
- **Nivin Pauly for** **Neram**
- **Gautham Karthik for** **Kadal**
Best Female Debut
- **Nazriya Nazim for** **Neram**
