= TN 07 AL 4777 =

2009 Indian Tamil drama thriller film by A. Lakshmikanthan

- Poster
- Directed by: A. Lakshmikanthan
- Written by: A. Lakshmikanthan
- Story by: Rajat Arora
- Based on: Taxi No. 9211 by Milan Luthria
- Produced by: Mahadevan Ganesh; Usha Venkatraman
- Starring: Pasupathy; Ajmal Ameer; Simran; Meenakshi
- Narrated by: Jeeva
- Cinematography: R. B. Gurudev
- Edited by: G. Sasikumar
- Music by: Vijay Antony
- Production company: GV Films
- Distributed by: Sanraa Media
- Release date: 20 February 2009
- Running time: 115 minutes
- Country: India
- Language: Tamil

TN-07 AL 4777 is a 2009 Indian Tamil-language thriller film directed by A. Lakshmikanthan. The film stars Pasupathy, Ajmal Ameer, Simran and Meenakshi. It is a remake of the 2006 Hindi film Taxi No. 9211 which was based on the American film Changing Lanes (2002). Pooja Umashankar makes a special appearance in the film.

== Plot ==
Manikandan alias Mani is a cab driver in Chennai who lies to his wife Subbalakshmi about his job, pretending to be an insurance salesman. One day, he gives Gautham, the spoilt son of a late businessman, a ride. Gautham is fighting for ownership rights of his late businessman's estate. The cab gets into an accident with Gautham's escaping as he's in hurry. Gautham loses his key to the vault containing his father's will in the back of Mani's taxi.

Mani decides to hide it from Gautham. As he is searching for the key, Gautham goes to Mani's house and tells Subbalakshmi what he really does for a living which Gautham didn't know. She leaves him, taking their son. Mani decides to take revenge. Mani and Gautham vow to kill each other in their fight for their properties. When Mani fails to kill Gautham, he targets Gautham's girlfriend, Pooja. As Mani chases Pooja, she gets saved by Gautham by a hair's breadth. Gautham lets Pooja escape, and he attacks Mani. They have a dirty car fight, but both survive.

Mani goes to Gautham's place. Gautham returns to his apartment from a second court hearing regarding his father's estate in defeat because he doesn't have his father's will torn to pieces and pasted on the wall of his apartment. Gautham becomes depressed and lonely after his friends leave him. Pooja dumps him, indicating she wanted him only for his fortune. After losing everything that used to be precious, Gautham realises the hard-hitting life and starts respecting his father and his work.

On the other side, Mani is caught again by police and taken to a police station where Subbalakshmi tells him about his real character and the problem within himself. Soon, he realises his mistake. Gautham then bails Mani out of jail after realising the value of close ones. Mani insists they have a drink and go to Gautham's house at one. They find out that they share the same birthday. Mani gives back his key, which he had hidden in the sofa, and says that he had never destroyed it – the torn will on the wall is a fake. Mani then goes to the railway station to stop Subbalakshmi and his son from leaving him but arrives a little too late. He goes back home, where he sees a birthday cake on the table. He feels he is hallucinating, but gets a pleasant shock, where he sees Subbalakshmi and his son standing there, singing him a birthday song (and finds out that it was Gautham who brought them back).

Gautham confronts the friend P.K.V Hariharan, the custodian property of Gautham's father, whom he tells that he has realised the value of life and does not want his father's property and takes a leave. Just as he drives out, his car collides with another car, driven by a woman. Initially, both seem to be angry at each other. Later Gautam apologises and asks for her number, promising to pay for damages. The movie ends as both smile at each other and drives away, indicating a new romantic beginning.

== Cast ==
- Pasupathy as Manikandan (Mani)
- Ajmal Ameer as Gautham
- Simran as Subbulakshmi Manikandan
- Meenakshi as Pooja Gautham (Voice dubbed by Chinmayi)
- Manobala as Police constable
- Adithya as Advocate Seshadri
- Mohan Raman as Palakkad Kasi Viswanatha Hariharan
- Meesai Rajendranath as Police inspector
- Master Rahul as Manikandan and Subbulakshmi's son
- Jiiva as narrator (voice)

Special appearances

- Vijay Antony in a special appearance in the song "Aathichudi"
- Pooja Umashankar in a cameo appearance
- Shobi Paulraj in a special appearance in the song "Aathichudi"

== Production ==
The number of the titular taxi, 4777, is a reference to the number of the car of M. G. Ramachandran.

== Soundtrack ==
Music was composed by Vijay Antony. The song "Aathichudi" is based on Dinesh Kanagaratnam's "Surangani Remake" from the album Tamizha (2008). Dinesh was retained as singer for "Aathichudi". The 12th century poet Avvaiyar is credited as lyricist because of her verses being used.

Song	Singers	Lyrics
"Aathichudi"	Vijay Antony, Dinesh Kanagaratnam	Vijay Antony (uncredited), Avvaiyar
"Iphone"	Ranjith, Sangeetha Rajeshwaran	Na. Muthukumar
"Kanneerai Pole"	V. Prasanna	Na. Muthukumar
"Theme Song"	Maya	Priyan
"Sorgam Madhuvile"	Rahul Nambiar, Sakthisree Gopalan	Priyan

== Critical reception ==
Pavithra Srinivasan of Rediff.com wrote "Hop on this taxi with discretion: the meter's okay, the tyres are good but there's no trusting the man behind the steering wheel, so the ride's bound to be a bumpy at best." Chennai Online wrote, "The interesting script, right cast, performances, and background score have made the ride enjoyable", but regarding the music said, "There is nothing much to write about Vijay Anthony's music, as no song stays in your mind. But he has done well in background score. Gurudev's cinematography adds value to the movie". The New Indian Express wrote, "The cast, majority of the performances, subtle filming, apt music and background scores - all accentuate its entertainment quotient [...] Music by Vijay Anthony and Gurudev's cinematography etch the pleasure derived from the movie further".
