= Etharkkum Thunindhavan (soundtrack) =

2022 soundtrack album by D. Imman

- Soundtrack Album Cover

Soundtrack album by D. Imman
- Released: 31 January 2022
- Recorded: 2021–2022
- Genre: Feature film soundtrack
- Length: 29:59
- Language: Tamil
- Label: Sun Pictures
- Producer: D. Imman

D. Imman chronology
Pon Manickavel (2021)	Etharkkum Thunindhavan (2022)	Yutha Satham (2022)

Singles from Etharkkum Thunindhavan
- 1. "Vaada Thambi" Released: 17 December 2021; 2. "Ullam Urugudhaiya" Released: 23 December 2021; 3. "Summa Surrunu" Released: 3 January 2022

Etharkkum Thunindhavan is the soundtrack album composed by D. Imman for the Tamil-language action thriller film of the same name directed by Pandiraj and produced by Sun Pictures, starring Suriya and Priyanka Arul Mohan. The soundtrack has ten tunes; four songs featuring lyrics written by Yugabharathi, Sivakarthikeyan and Vignesh Shivan and the remainder of the album featured instrumental tracks used in the background score. It was released on 31 January 2022.

== Development ==
The music of the film is composed by D. Imman in his third collaboration with Pandiraj, following Kadaikutty Singam (2018) and Namma Veettu Pillai (2019). (Note: Also produced by Sun Pictures) Imman was initially roped in for the untitled film with Suriya, which was directed by Siva, and also for Aruvaa, which was directed by Hari. As the projects did not materialise, this film marked the first collaboration with the actor. Yugabharathi and Vignesh Shivan were initially hired for writing the song lyrics. In November 2021, actor Sivakarthikeyan was also announced to pen lyrics for one of the songs in the film. (Note: Sivakarthikeyan earlier collaborated with Pandiraj in his debut film Marina (2012) and Namma Veettu Pillai (2019))

The composer had worked with an ensemble musical team of 100 musicians to work on the film's soundtrack and background music. In early-December, reports surfaced that G. V. Prakash Kumar will record the introductory track for the film, and Anirudh Ravichander was also roped in to croon for one of the tracks in the album, which consisting of a different genre. Later, the team had officially announced that both the composers had recorded the vocals for the track titled "Vaada Thambi" which was written by Vignesh Shivan. Carnatic musician Brinda Manickavasakan made her debut as a playback singer in feature film, with the track "Ullam Urugudhaiya".

== Release ==
A promo video of the first single "Vaada Thambi", was released on 16 December, with the full song being unveiled the following day. The lyric video was also launched on the same day, through the official YouTube channel of Sun TV. On 23 December 2021, the lyrical video of the second single "Ullam Urugudhaiya" was unveiled along with the full song. A romantic melody duet, sung by Pradeep Kumar and Vandana Srinivasan, the track and the first line of the song is inspired from the religious song of the same name, sung by T. M. Soundararajan, for Lord Murugan. It was marketed as a "romantic melody with divine musical backdrop" and featured Suriya in the costumes of Lord Murugan, a warrior prince and a king in the track. It received a million views within hours after its release. On 3 January 2022, the third single track "Summa Surrunu", sung by Armaan Malik and Nikhita Gandhi was released, touted to be a "quirky" number.

On 30 January, the makers unveiled the film's theme music and original background score through YouTube, a month before the film's release in March 2022. The tracks were later bundled into the film's soundtrack album and was released separately into music platforms, the following day (31 January 2022).

The soundtrack for the dubbed versions in Telugu, Hindi, Malayalam and Kannada were released on 4 March 2022.

== Track listing ==
=== Tamil ===
No.	Title	Lyrics	Singer(s)	Length
1.	"Vaada Thambi"	Vignesh Shivan	G. V. Prakash Kumar, Anirudh Ravichander	04:21
2.	"Ullam Urugudhaiya"	Yugabharathi	Pradeep Kumar, Vandana Srinivasan, Brindha Manickavasakan	03:59
3.	"Summa Surrunu"	Sivakarthikeyan	Armaan Malik, Nikhita Gandhi	03:46
4.	"Etharkkum Thunindhavan"	MC Rude	MC Rude	02:03
5.	"Romedy" (Theme)	—	Instrumental	01:58
6.	"Venom" (Theme)	Joewin Shamalina	Joewin Shamalina	02:05
7.	"Thandavam" (Theme)	—	Instrumental	03:18
8.	"The Prey" (Theme)	—	Sahana, Maria Roe Vincent	05:23
9.	"Jubilation" (Theme)	—	Instrumental	01:34
10.	"Pouncing Tiger" (Theme)	—	Instrumental	01:30
Total length:				29:59

=== Telugu ===
All lyrics are written by Vanamali except where noted.

No.	Title	Lyrics	Singer(s)	Length
1.	"Raa Raa Friendu"		Diwakar	04:20
2.	"Gunde Karignayyaa"		Sathya Prakash, Vandana Srinivasan	04:00
3.	"Churru Churranni"		Haricharan, Srinidhi	03:44
4.	"ET Theme"		MC Rude	02:03
5.	"Romedy" (Theme)	—	Instrumental	01:58
6.	"Venom" (Theme)	Joewin Shamalina	Joewin Shamalina	02:05
7.	"Thandavam" (Theme)	—	Instrumental	03:18
8.	"The Prey" (Theme)	—	Sahana, Maria Roe Vincent	05:23
9.	"Jubilation" (Theme)	—	Instrumental	01:34
10.	"Pouncing Tiger" (Theme)	—	Instrumental	01:30
Total length:				27:53

=== Hindi ===
All lyrics are written by Raqueeb Alam except where noted.

No.	Title	Lyrics	Singer(s)	Length
1.	"ET Theme"		Vyasaraaj	02:03
2.	"Sulagta Hai Jiya"		Deepak Blue, Iraa	04:03
3.	"Silk Wala Kurta"		Santhosh Venky, Rita	03:53
4.	"Bole Wahi"		Santhosh Venky	04:24
5.	"Romedy" (Theme)	—	Instrumental	01:58
6.	"Venom" (Theme)	Joewin Shamalina	Joewin Shamalina	02:05
7.	"Thandavam" (Theme)	—	Instrumental	03:18
8.	"The Prey" (Theme)	—	Sahana, Maria Roe Vincent	05:23
9.	"Jubilation" (Theme)	—	Instrumental	01:34
10.	"Pouncing Tiger" (Theme)	—	Instrumental	01:30
Total length:				27:53

=== Malayalam ===
All lyrics are written by Shibu Kallar except where noted.

No.	Title	Lyrics	Singer(s)	Length
1.	"Vaada Mone"		Sarath Santhosh	04:20
2.	"Ullil Unarukayaayi"		Sreekanth Hariharan, Devu Mathew	03:59
3.	"Kuliralli Nilavil"		Sarath Santhosh, Devu Mathew	03:44
4.	"ET Theme (lyrics by MC Rude)"		MC Rude	02:03
5.	"Romedy" (Theme)	—	Instrumental	01:58
6.	"Venom" (Theme)	Joewin Shamalina	Joewin Shamalina	02:05
7.	"Thandavam" (Theme)	—	Instrumental	03:18
8.	"The Prey" (Theme)	—	Sahana, Maria Roe Vincent	05:23
9.	"Jubilation" (Theme)	—	Instrumental	01:34
10.	"Pouncing Tiger" (Theme)	—	Instrumental	01:30
Total length:				27:53

=== Kannada ===
All lyrics are written by Kinnal Raj except where noted.

No.	Title	Lyrics	Singer(s)	Length
1.	"Eru Eru"		Santhosh Venky	04:20
2.	"Nalla e Hrudayavu"		Deepak Blue, Airaa Udupi	03:59
3.	"Silku Jubba"		Vyaasaraj, Airaa Uduppi	03:45
4.	"ET Theme"		Vyaasaraj	02:03
5.	"Romedy" (Theme)	—	Instrumental	01:58
6.	"Venom" (Theme)	Joewin Shamalina	Joewin Shamalina	02:05
7.	"Thandavam" (Theme)	—	Instrumental	03:18
8.	"The Prey" (Theme)	—	Sahana, Maria Roe Vincent	05:23
9.	"Jubilation" (Theme)	—	Instrumental	01:34
10.	"Pouncing Tiger" (Theme)	—	Instrumental	01:30
Total length:				27:52
