= Keba Jeremiah =

Indian musician (born 1986)

- Born: Keba Jeremiah Arul; 18 October 1986 (age 40); Al Karama, Dubai, UAE
- Genres: Acoustic; jazz; rock; contemporary R&B; blues rock; funk; gospel; pop; worship; world
- Occupation: Musician
- Instruments: Acoustic guitar; electric guitar; bass guitar; electric bass; keyboards; piano; drums
- Years active: 2008–present
- Member of: RIJK
- Website: www.kebajeremiah.com

Keba Jeremiah Arul (born 18 October 1986) is an Indian guitarist and music producer focused on Hindi, Telugu, and Tamil films, as well as gospel music.

== Early life ==
Keba Jeremiah was born in Al Karama, Dubai. He played the bass guitar for his school band at Our Own English High School, where he received awards at inter-school competitions. In 2004, he moved to India and attended the Hindustan College of Engineering, Chennai, to pursue a professional engineering degree. Jeremiah began performing at the New Life Assemblies of God Church every Sunday.

== Career ==
After graduation, Jeremiah formed the Christian music band Fire Frenzy with college peers. In 2005, he started teaching music at the Institute of Music Technology, in Anna Nagar, East Chennai, founded and led by John Satya.

He began his career with music director James Vasanthan on the soundtrack for the 2008 Tamil film Subramaniapuram. He has also collaborated with composers including Yuvan Shankar Raja, Manikanth Kadri, Harris Jayaraj, Ouseppachan, A. R. Rahman, James Vasanthan, Anirudh Ravichander, D. Imman.

Following his work on the soundtrack to the 2011 musical drama film Rockstar, scored by A. R. Rahman, Jeremiah has contributed guitar work to several of the composer's subsequent film scores.

In 2013, he worked on Rahman's film soundtracks Kadal, Maryan, and Raanjhanaa. He performed on the soundtracks for Sutta Kadhai, Vanakkam Chennai, Chennai Express, and Yeh Jawaani Hai Deewani. Meanwhile, he played on various gospel albums and concerts, collaborating with independent artists like Jonita Gandhi, Abhilash LR, Sid Sriram, and Maalavika Manoj, among others.

He is currently a member of the band RIJK (named for members Rodney Jayaraj, Isaac Dharmakumar, John Praveen, and himself). RIJK is a popular cover band for gospel and Tamil songs; the group plays a mix of genres, including rock, R&B, jazz, and fusion. A number of Indian singers have been guests on their cover songs, such as Pragathi Guruprasad, Jonita Gandhi, Andrea Jeremiah, Nikhita Gandhi, Alisha Thomas, and Ash King.

Jeremiah has produced music for Tamil and Hindi films, including Paiyaa, Pasanga, Engeyum Kadhal, Savari, Avan Ivan, Mankatha, 3, Action Replayy, Rockstar, and Ek Deewana Tha.

He has collaborated with Indian musicians including Leslee Lewis, Naresh Iyer, and Vijay Prakash, and international artists like Don Moen, Bob Fits, Steve Kuban, and Sean Michael. He has appeared on television programmes and music competitions including Airtel Super Singer, Ooo La La, and Kadhal Unplugged.

Jeremiah's repertoire includes experimental and acoustic music. His solo material incorporates influences from jazz, rock, and R&B.

== Discography ==
=== Live concerts ===
- A.R Rahman's London concert
- Rahman's Chennai concert, "Nenje Ezhu", 2016
- Rahman's concert, "The Magic of A. R. Rahman", 2016
- Anirudh Live in Concert 2016 – Malaysia
- Anirudh Live in Concert 2016 – Toronto, Canada
- Sid Sriram Live 2017 – Malaysia
- Verasa Pogaiyile – "A Musical Journey with D. Imman", Live Concert 2017 – Singapore
- Rahman's "One Heart"
- Rahman's Dubai concert, 2017
- Rahman's Sydney concert, 2017
- Rahman's Manchester concert, 2017
- Rahman's Encore Concert – Mumbai (2017), Hyderabad, Ahmedabad, and Delhi
- Rahman's Bhubaneswar concert, 2018
- Rahman's Cuttack concert, 2018
- "Celebrating 25 years of Rahman"

=== Film soundtracks ===
As composer

- Demonte Colony (2015)

As musician

- Subramaniyapuram (2008)
- Saroja (2008)
- The Fakir of Venice (2009)
- Mankatha (2011)
- Kadal (2013)
- Raanjhanaa (2013)
- Maryan (2013)
- Lingaa (2014)
- I (2015)
- O Kadhal Kanmani (2015)
- Naanum Rowdy Dhaan (2015)
- Tamasha (2015)
- Kabali (2016)
- Rekka (2016)
- Kodi (2016)
- Janatha Garage (2016)
- Remo (2016)
- Kotigobba 2 (2016)
- Kidaari (2016)
- Mohenjo Daro (2016)
- Achcham Yenbadhu Madamaiyada (2016)
- Kabali (2016)
- Iraivi (2016)
- Meen Kuzhambum Mann Paanaiyum (2016)
- Wagah (2016)
- Sarrainodu (2016)
- Vetrivel (2016)
- Rum (2016)
- Kavalai Vendam (2016)
- 24 (2016)
- Rarandoi Veduka Chudham (2017), on "Thakita Thakjham"
- Adhagappattathu Magajanangalay (2017)
- Kattappava Kanom (2017)
- Maanagaram (2017)
- Kaatru Veliyidai (2017)
- Mom (2017)
- Bairavaa (2017)
- Dora (2017)
- OK Jaanu (2017), on "Enna Sonna"
- Velaikaran (2017)
- Vivegam (2017)
- Mersal (2017)
- Ippadai Vellum (2017)
- Sanju (2018)
- Thaanaa Serndha Koottam (2018)
- Tamizh Padam 2 (2018)
- Saamy Square (2018)
- Sarkar (2018)
- Sarvam Thaala Mayam (2019)
- Petta (2019)
- 99 Songs (2019)
- Namma Veetu Pillai (2019)
- Bigil (2019)
- Darbar (2020)
- Master (2021)
- Sulthan (2021)
- Doctor (2021)
- Annaatthe (2021)
- Beast (2022)
- Vikram (2022)
- Kazhuvethi Moorkhan (2023)
- Maamannan (2023)
- Jailer (2023)
- Jawan (2023)
- Leo (2023)
- Inga Naan Thaan Kingu (2024)
- Raayan (2024)
- Devara (2024)
- Vettaiyan (2024)
- Vidaamuyarchi (2025)
- Baby and Baby (2025)
- Dragon (2025)
- Eleven (2025)
- Thug Life (2025)
- 3BHK (2025)
- Paranthu Po (2025)
- Bun Butter Jam (2025)
- Coolie (2025)
- Madharasi (2025) - Acoustic, electric guitar and Bass guitar
- Bomb (2025)
- Bison (2025)
- Diesel (2025)
- Dude (2025) – acoustic, electric, and bass guitars, charango
- Love Insurance Kompany ( 2026)
- Jana Nayagan (2026)
- DC (2026) – Electric guitar
- Jailer 2 (2026) – acoustic, electric, and bass guitars

== Equipment ==
- Acoustics guitars: Taylor 410ce, Taylor 914ce, Taylor NS34, Taylor classical guitar, Cort Earth Series 1200 Nat, Maestro
- Electric guitars: Ibanez JS2400, Fender Telecaster, Fender Stratocaster, Paul Reed Smith, Suhr
- Bass guitars: Sadowsky
