= Meenakshi (actress) =

Indian actress

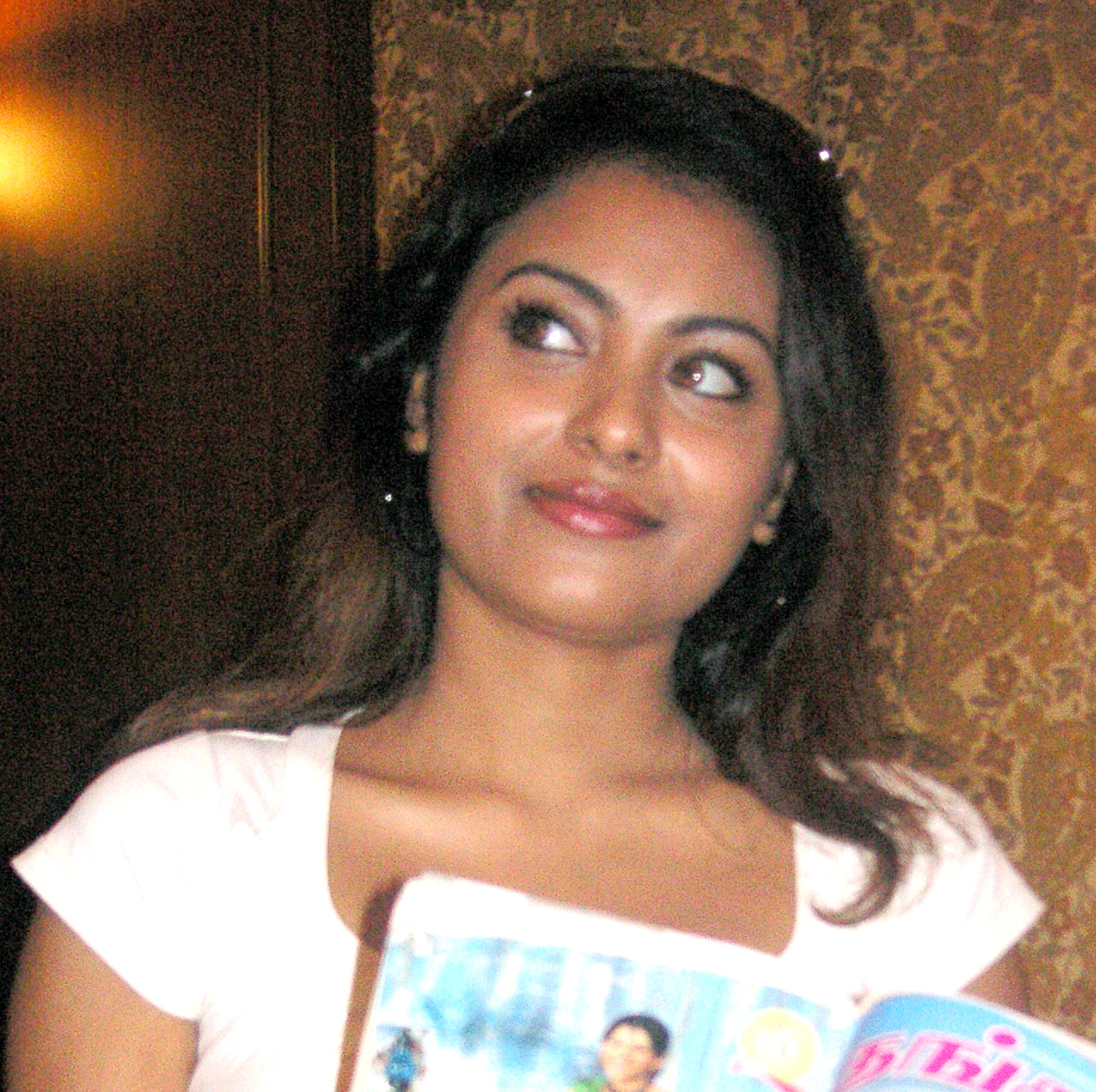
- Meenakshi posing with a copy of the Thangam magazine
- Born: Pinky Sarkar; 6 August 1982 (age 44); Kolkata, West Bengal, India
- Occupation: Actress
- Years active: 2006–2017

Pinky Sarkar (born 6 August 1982) better known as Meenakshi, is an Indian actress, who appears in Tamil, Telugu and Malayalam language films. She is probably best known for her performance as Raasathi in her debut film Karuppusamy Kuththagaithaarar.

== Career ==
=== Debut ===
Meenakshi first appeared in two Telugu ventures, the historical fiction Hanumanthu and the devotional film Sri Satyanarayana Swamy, under her birth name Pinky Sarkar; the latter featured her as goddess Lakshmi, with a reviewer from Indiaglitz.com writing that she "failed to emote well".

=== Breakthrough (2007–2010) ===
In 2007, she made her Tamil debut in Karuppusamy Kuththagaithaarar, playing the role of Raasathi, a first year medical student. She made an impression in the film and was subsequently flooded with similar girl next door roles. Not wanting to becoming typecast, she rejected all roles, took a break from acting and completed her education before returning to Chennai.

In 2009, she had her next Tamil release, TN 07 AL 4777, which was a remake of the Hindi film Taxi No. 9211. She played the role of Pooja, a "rich extrovert and party loving cosmopolitan girl", for which she went in for a fashion makeover just like Sameera Reddy. That year, she starred in two more Tamil films, Sundar C's Perumal and Raghava Lawrence's Rajadhi Raja, besides making a special appearance in a third, Vishal's Thoranai; however all films were box office failures. The following year, she was seen in Karu Pazhaniappan's Mandhira Punnagai and Agam Puram, after which she did not act for over three years as she was pursuing her MBA degree and taking care of her father who was not well.

=== Work after sabbatical (2014–present) ===
In 2014, she took up a lead role in Villangam and a supporting role in Vetrimaaran's Soodhadi besides agreeing to perform in a special song in Ezhil's Vellaikaara Durai.

== Filmography ==
- All films are in Tamil; otherwise language noted.

Year	Title	Role	Notes
2006	Veyil	Kathir and Murugesan's sister	
2006	Hanumanthu		Telugu film
2007	Sri Satyanarayana Swamy	Lakshmi	Telugu film
2007	Karuppusamy Kuththagaithaarar	Raasathi	
2009	TN 07 AL 4777	Pooja	
2009	Perumal	Dr. Alamu	
2009	Rajadhi Raja	Thangapazham	
2009	Thoranai / Pistha		Special appearance; also shot in Telugu
2009	Chattambinadu	Dr.Lakshmi	Malayalam film
2010	Mandhira Punnagai	Nandhini	
2010	Agam Puram	Nadia	
2012	Thuppakki	Wedding Bride	Special appearance
2014	Vellaikaara Durai		Special appearance
2015	Naanum Rowdydhaan	Baby	Special appearance
2016	Sowkarpettai	Sanya	Special appearance
2016	Thirunaal	Prema	
2016	Ner Mugam		
2017	Aangila Padam	Meenakshi	
