= Perumal (disambiguation) =

Perumal (the 'Great One') is a medieval Indian royal title.

Perumal may also refer to:

- Perumal (deity), a Hindu deity
- Perumal (film), a 2009 Tamil action film

== See also ==
- Legend of Cheraman Perumals
- Chera Perumals of Makotai, a ruling dynasty in present-day Kerala
