= Parmatma =

- Directed by: Chand
- Written by: Jainendra Jain
- Release date: 1978
- Country: India
- Language: Hindi

Parmatma (परमात्मा) is a 1978 Bollywood adventure film directed by Chand.

== Cast ==
- Shatrughan Sinha as Anand
- Rekha as Deepa
- Aruna Irani as Lily
- Imtiaz Khan as Zorawar Singh (as Imtiaz)
- Pradeep Kumar as Guruji Maharaj 'Swami'
- Ranjeet as Johnny
- Dev Kumar as Girdhari (Johnny's Father)
- Jagdish Raj as Inspector
- Chand Usmani
- Helen as Katorani (Bar Girl)
- Komilla Wirk (as Komila Wirk)

== Soundtrack ==
Parmatma

Film score by K. Babuji Indeevar (lyrics)
- Released: 1976
- Genre: Soundtrack
- Label: EMI
- Producer: K. Babuji

All lyrics are written by Indeevar; all music is composed by K. Babuji. The song "Surangani" was adapted from the Sri Lankan song of the same name.

Track list
No.	Title	Singer(s)	Length
1.	"Parmatma Hain Pyare"	Mohammed Rafi, Chorus
2.	"Pyar Ka Tum Badla"	Asha Bhosle
3.	"Aankh Ladti Hai"	Asha Bhosle, Chorus
4.	"Too Sab Ki Mata"	Asha Bhosle, Ganga Prasad, Chorus
5.	"Surangani"	Asha Bhosle, Bhupinder, Chorus
6.	"Saath Kisike Koi"	Mukesh
7.	"Apni Nazar Men"	Asha Bhosle
