= Kadal (soundtrack) =

2012 soundtrack album by A. R. Rahman

- Soundtrack cover

Soundtrack album by A. R. Rahman
- Released: 27 November 2012
- Recorded: 2011–2012
- Studios: Panchathan Record Inn and AM Studios, Chennai; Nirvana Studios, Mumbai; Panchathan Hollywood Studios, Los Angeles
- Genre: Feature film soundtrack
- Length: 34:23
- Language: Tamil
- Label: Sony Music India
- Producer: A. R. Rahman

A. R. Rahman chronology
Jab Tak Hai Jaan (2012)	Kadal (2012)	Maryan (2013)

Kadal is the soundtrack album composed by A. R. Rahman for the 2013 Tamil film of the same name, directed by Mani Ratnam that stars Gautham Karthik and Thulasi Nair in the lead roles. Noted poet-lyricist Vairamuthu and his son Madhan Karky penned lyrics for three songs each. The album was released under Sony Music India on 27 November 2012.

== Development ==
Director Mani Ratnam's usual associate music composer, A. R. Rahman was signed to compose the songs as well as the background score for the film. Rahman visited Mani Ratnam at one of the filming locations near the coastal areas of Thiruchendur where they had a boat ride into the sea to discuss about the songs. In an interview, Rahman stated that the music of Kadal is a blend of Christian gospel, blues and Carnatic music as the film plot portrays Christian fishermen. Rahman claimed the sea to be a huge inspiration and hence the song "Chithirai Nila" was born out of this inspiration. As Mani Ratnam insisted on romantic numbers, Rahman composed "Nenjukulley" and "Moongil Thottam" in the same tempo. The songs were alternate choices for Ratnam but he retained both. On composition of song "Adiye", according to the composer, most Christian gospel songs have a blues feel to them. However, he clubbed the folk genre with jazz vocal backing into it as picturisation was to be done on a village boy. Initially, Ratnam wanted the composer to croon the track but the latter had already finalised "Elay Keechan" and hence "Adiye" was sung by Sid Sriram. The operatic Italian version of song "Anbin Vaasale", sung by Natalie Di Luccio was used in the background score of the film. A gibberish song sung by A.R. Rahman, used only in the film was featured on the character Celina (played by Lakshmi Manchu).

The soundtrack features seven songs and two of the songs penned by Vairamuthu are taken from "A Compilation of Vairamuthu's Poems" and the third one from his work about sea odyssey, Thanner Thesam. The song "Magudi Magudi" features vocals and lyrics by Sri Lankan rapper Aaryan Dinesh Kanagaratnam.

== Release ==
Sony Music India procured the audio rights of the soundtrack. On 2 November 2012, an unplugged version of the song "Nenjukulle" was performed by Shakthisree Gopalan in the first episode of MTV Unplugged India: Season 2, aired over MTV India channel. In an interview, Rahman stated that the performed unplugged song would differ slightly from the soundtrack version. The song garnered an overwhelming response with positive feedback from several viewers over the internet. The official soundtrack version of the song was released as a single on 21 November 2012. The track "Elay Keechan" was released as a promotional single on 25 November 2012. The complete album was initially supposed to be released on 12 November 2012, although lyricist Karky as well as several media reports confirmed the same, the officials of Madras Talkies denied such release schedules. The soundtrack album was scheduled to release on 30 November 2012, but due to tremendous pre-booking orders, the audio label advanced the release by two days.

== Reception ==
=== Critical response ===
Professional ratings
Review scores
Source	Rating
Musicperk	9/10 stars
Indiaglitz	4/5 stars
Behindwoods	3.5/5 stars
Music Aloud	9/10 stars
Rediff	3.5/5 stars

The soundtrack album received positive reviews. Music Aloud stated "A R Rahman does it again for Mani Ratnam with an exquisite mix of genres not often heard in Tamil." Indiaglitz on a positive note stated, "Rahman delivers of Mani Ratnam once again." Behindwoods quoted "Kadal is salt of the earth stuff from A.R. Rahman that is rewarding of your time spent on it." Sri Krishna of Musicperk summarized, "There's an unwritten rule in Indian Cinema that goes something like this: “Rahman reserves his God Mode for Mani Ratnam“. The validity of that statement has once again been established beyond ambiguity, Kadal is one for the ages, if you are a fan of deep, enduring music." Pavithra Srinivasan of Rediff stated in her review, "It's been said that A R Rahman always delivers his very best for Mani Ratnam. It looks like it with Kadal, where the composer experiments and runs riot with different styles with some success." In an interview with CNN-IBN, senior film journalist Sreedhar Pillai said, "I definitely think it [Kadal] is ARR's best in recent times, the magic is very much there!" and he added that the album "has taken Tamil music to the next level." In contrast, India Today stated that the album "falls short to be called Rahman's best", but called it "enjoyable".

=== Chart performance ===
Within a day of its release on 22 November 2012, the song "Elay Keechaan" notched to position one and "Nenjukkule" at two on iTunes India charts. Though the latter track clinched down, "Elay Keechaan" continued to be the chart topper for over two weeks. The complete album held the first position on iTunes India charts post its release. All the songs marked their position in the top ten songs category on iTunes. This made Kadal's soundtrack enter into number one soundtrack album in India by December 2012.

#	Song title	Peak position
a	"Chithirai Nela"	7
b	"Adiye"	2
c	"Moongil Thottam"	3
d	"Elay Keechaan"	1
e	"Nenjukkule"	6
f	"Anbin Vaasale"	4
g	"Magudi Magudi"	5

== Track listing ==
=== Original Version ===
Prior to the release of the Tamil soundtrack album the song names were available over the internet by early November 2012. The complete track listing was released on the film's official social networking page as well as on A.R. Rahman's official website on 25 November 2012.

No.	Title	Lyrics	Singer(s)	Length
1.	"Elay Keechaan"	Madhan Karky	A. R. Rahman	06:11
2.	"Adiye"	Madhan Karky	Sid Sriram, Maria Roe Vincent (Jazz Vocals)	05:03
3.	"Moongil Thottam"	Vairamuthu	Abhay Jodhpurkar, Harini	04:36
4.	"Anbin Vaasale"	Madhan Karky	Haricharan, Chennai Chorale Group (Choir)	05:14
5.	"Magudi Magudi"	Aaryan Dinesh Kanagaratnam	Aaryan Dinesh Kanagaratnam, Chinmayee, Tanvi Shah	03:32
6.	"Nenjukkule"	Vairamuthu	Shakthisree Gopalan	04:51
7.	"Chithirai Nela"	Vairamuthu	Vijay Yesudas	04:57
Total length:				34:32

=== Telugu Version ===
The song "Gunjukunna" was released on Madras Talkies's official YouTube channel on 6 December 2012. Lyrics for the Telugu version of the soundtrack are penned by poet Vanamali. Though the music was released on the label Sony Music India, direct to stores on 19 December 2012, the audio was launched in a grand function held at H.I.C.C Novotel, Hyderabad on 2 January 2013. Suhasini Mani Ratnam and actor Arjun hosted the event. Before addressing the audience, the event opened up with composer A.R. Rahman performing medley on the keyboard, playing tunes of "Chinni Chinni Aasaa" and "Vinara Vinara" from the film Roja, thereby paying ode to his most collaborated director Mani Ratnam. Later, singer Sid Sriram performed the track "Yadike" and singers Harini and Abhay Jodhpurkar crooned "Patchani Thotta" on the stage. The lead debutantes of the film, Thulasi Nair and Gautham Karthik made their first public appearance through this event.

All lyrics are written by Vanamali; all music is composed by A. R. Rahman.

Kadali (Telugu)
No.	Title	Singer(s)	Length
1.	"Elay Jelle"	A. R. Rahman	06:11
2.	"Yadike"	Sid Sriram, Maria Roe Vincent (Jazz Vocals)	05:04
3.	"Patchani Thotta"	Abhay Jodhpurkar, Harini	04:36
4.	"Mamathe Neevule"	Haricharan, Chennai Chorale Group (Choir)	05:13
5.	"Magidi Magidi"	Aaryan Dinesh Kanagaratnam, Chinmayee, Tanvi Shah	03:31
6.	"Gunjukunnaa"	Shakthisree Gopalan, A. R. Rahman	04:46
7.	"Chitti Jaabili"	Vijay Yesudas	04:57
Total length:			33:15

== Accolades ==
Ceremony	Category	Nominee(s)	Result	Reference (s)
Radio Mirchi – "Top song of the Year"	Nenjukkule	A. R. Rahman	Won	
2013 MTV Europe Music Awards	Best Indian Act for "Nenjukkule (unplugged)"	A. R. Rahman	Nominated	
Vikatan Awards	Best Female Playback Singer	Shakthisree Gopalan	Won	
Norway Tamil Film Festival Awards	Best Music Director	A. R. Rahman	Won	
Filmfare Awards	Best Music Director	A. R. Rahman	Won	
Filmfare Awards	Best Playback Singer (Female)	Shakthisree Gopalan	Won	
Filmfare Awards	Best Singer (Male)	A. R. Rahman	Nominated	
Filmfare Awards	Best Lyricist	Madhan Karky (for "Chithirai Nila")	Nominated	
Filmfare Awards	Best Lyricist	Madhan Karky (for "Anbin Vaasale")	Nominated	
2014 Vijay Awards	Best Music Director	A. R. Rahman	Won	
2014 Vijay Awards	Best Female Playback Singer	Shakthisree Gopalan	Won	
2014 Edison Awards	Best Music Director	A. R. Rahman	Nominated	
