= Maria Roe Vincent =

Roe Vincent
- Born: Chennai, Tamil Nadu, India
- Genres: Tamil, Pop and Hip-Hop.
- Occupations: Playback Singer, Composer, Vocal Arranger, Producer
- Years active: 2010 – present

Roe Vincent is a singer, composer and vocal arranger. She has worked with the Indian music industry's best music directors such as A. R. Rahman, Harris Jayaraj, D. Imman, Vijay Antony, Srinivas, Anirudh Ravichander, S. J. Surya and Joshua Sridhar. Her hit songs include "Adiye" from the movie Kadal and "Hey" from the movie Vanakkam Chennai. Her vocal arrangements have been featured in block buster movies such as Kadal, Mariyan, Highway, Million Dollar Arm, Yaamirukka Bayamey and many more. Her work has called her to arrange and produce for various TV shows such as Vijay TV's Airtel Super Singer in Chennai and Mazhavil Manorama's Josco Indian Voice in Kerala and Superstar in Astro TV, Malaysia. She conducts a choral vocal group named El Fé, is the lead singer of her band Overtone and performs in various shows and concerts with them.

== Early life and family background ==
Maria Roshni Vincent was born in Chennai. Her father is Mr. Leo Vincent, an Engineer and her mother is Mrs. Anita Vincent. She has a younger sister Maryann Ranjini Vincent who is a Graphic Designer. She is the only professional musician in her family. She was educated at Good Shepherd Matriculation Higher Secondary School. She is a B.Sc. zoology graduate from Stella Maris College. She also holds a bachelor's degree in English from Madras University. She has completed her bachelor's degree in music from the International College of Music (ICOM) in Kuala Lumpur and the Berklee College of Music in Boston and has her 8th grade in piano from the Trinity College, London. She plays the piano and guitar.

== Career ==
She was introduced by music director D. Imman in the movie Kacheri Arambam. She had sung the song "Kadavule" in the movie. She worked as a Western Contemporary Instructor at A. R. Rahman’s KM College of Music. While she was working there A. R. Rahman spotted her and gave her an opportunity to sing in "Adiye" in the movie Kadal. Since then, she has sung and arranged vocals in several movies' songs and background scores such as Linga, Maryaan, Kochadhayan, Yaamirukka Bayamey, Million Dollar Arm, Monkeys of Mumbai, Moonu, Anegan, Maan Karate, Vanakkam Chennai, Amen, GodFather, Ek deewana Tha, Highway etc. Her debut single "Neethan Yen Dream Girl" was released on YouTube.

=== El FÉ Choir ===
She started the "El FÉ Choir" four years ago. They have been featured in many movies. The choir is owned and directed by her. The choir's movie credits include the following:

- 3(Moonu)
- Maan Karate
- Sigaram Thodu
- Jeeva
- Million Dollar Arm
- Yaamirukka Bayamey
- Anegan
- Romeo Juliet
- Maryan – BGM
- Valiyavan
- Kanchana 2
- Ai
- Lingaa
- Singam 3
- Yaman
- Monsoon Mangoes
- Million Dollar Arm
- Kaaki Sattai
- Sigaram Thodu
- Naanum Rowdy Dhaan
- Thani Oruvan
- 24
- Leo
- Dragon (2025)

The Choir has done a Christmas Single titled "Oh Holy Night" which was released recently.

== Discography ==
=== Tamil ===
| Year | Song | Movie | Co-singers | Music director |
|---|---|---|---|---|
| 2010 | Kadavule | Kacheri Arambam | | D. Imman |
| 2013 | Adiye | Kadal | | A. R. Rahman |
| 2013 | Hey | Vanakkam Chennai | | Anirudh Ravichander |
| 2014 | Muttallai | Yennamo Yedho | | D. Imman |
| 2014 | Mazhakadha | Oru Oorla Rendu Raja | | D. Imman |
| 2014 | Madras to Madurai | Aambala | | Hiphop Tamizha |
| 2015 | Neetho Ala | OK Bangaram | | A. R. Rahman |
| 2016 | Face off (Theme) | Iru Mugan | | Harris Jeyaraj |
| 2016 | Oorellam Ketkudhe | Thodari | Shreya Ghoshal | D. Imman |
| 2016 | Thaaru Maaru Thakkali Soru | Veera Sivaji | | D. Imman |
| 2016 | Sona Sona | Vasuvum Saravananum Onna Padichavanga | | D. Imman |
| 2016 | Bubbly Bubbly | Pokkiri Raja | | D. Imman |
| 2017 | Konjam Vera Maari | Single | | Maria Roe Vincent |
| 2017 | Vanam (Theme) | Vanamagan | | Harris Jayaraj |
| 2018 | Thaarumaaru Thakkali Soru | Veera Sivaji | | D. Imman |
| 2019 | Beer Biriyani | 90 ML | | STR |
| 2019 | Petta Parak | Petta | | Anirudh Ravichander |
| 2022 | The Prey (Theme) | Etharkkum Thunindhavan | Sahana | D. Imman |

=== Hindi ===
| Year | Song | Movie | Co-singers | Music director |
|---|---|---|---|---|
| 2012 | Hosanna | Ekk Deewana Tha | Leon D'souza, Suzanne D'Mello | A. R. Rahman |
| 2022 | The Prey (Theme) | Etharkkum Thunindhavan | Sahana | D. Imman |

=== Kannada ===
| Year | Song | Movie | Co-singers | Music director |
|---|---|---|---|---|
| 2012 | Alapanae | Godfather | Abhay Jodhpurkar | A. R. Rahman |
| 2022 | The Prey (Theme) | Etharkkum Thunindhavan | Sahana | D. Imman |

=== BGM’s ===
| Movie | Music director | Description |
|---|---|---|
| Kadal | A. R. Rahman | Heroine’s Theme |
| Jeeva | D. Imman | Fully |
| Oru Oorla Rendu Raja | D. Imman | Fully |
| Valiyavan | D. Imman | Fully |
| Miruthan | D. Imman | Fully |
| Bogan | D. Imman | Fully |
| Yutha Satham | D. Imman | Binaural Sound |

1. Neethan Yen Dream Girl – Debut as a Composer

== Concerts and performances ==
- She has performed in A. R. Rahman’s concert "Thai Mannae Vanakkam".
- She has worked for Vijay TV’s Airtel Super Singer in 2011. She has also sung for the show.
- She has performed with Music Director Anoop in Hyderabad.
- She has also worked in Gospel Music with Gospel Singers like Gersson Edinbaro and Daniel Jawahar.
