= Godfather (soundtrack) =

- Original CD cover

Soundtrack album by A. R. Rahman
- Released: 13 June 2012
- Studio: Panchathan Record Inn and AM Studios, Chennai
- Genre: Feature film soundtrack
- Length: 41.37
- Language: Kannada
- Label: Ashwini Media Networks
- Producer: A. R. Rahman

A. R. Rahman chronology
Ekk Deewana Tha (2012)	Godfather (2012)	People Like Us (2012)

Godfather is the soundtrack album of the 2012 Kannada drama film of the same name, directed by cinematographer-turned-director Sethu Sriram, starring Upendra in a triple role. The soundtrack album consists of eight songs composed by A. R. Rahman, and lyrics penned by K. Kalyan, Devappa Hassan and Kaviraj. The background score of the film is composed by Rajesh Ramanath. Rahman retained most of the tracks from the original version, which also featured musical score by him. The audio was launched in a grand manner at Chancery Hotel, Bengaluru on 13 June 2012. The album received positive critical reception upon release.

== Development ==
Cinematographer P. C. Sreeram insisted his longtime friend A. R. Rahman to compose the music for the film. Rahman retained most of his compositions from the Tamil version and composed one fresh track for the Kannada version, "Aalapane Mellane". The soundtrack features eight songs; five have lyrics penned by K. Kalyan, one by Devappa Hassan, Kaviraj and Blaaze. Considering the budget limitations of the Kannada film industry, the composer hardly accepted any remuneration for the project. A crore expenditure was accounted for the studio, artists, instruments, recording and re-recording. The score was completed in a span of six months. The melancholic song "Laali Laali Amma" crooned by Naresh Iyer, describes a mother-son relationship, sang from a perspective of a son who loves his mother and is willing to support and protect her all her life. This song features Upendra and Catherine Tresa in their respective roles. The song with classical melodies is based on Raagas Charukesi, Sarasangi. The track titled "Sarigama Sangamave" is based on the raaga Udayaravichandrika. The tune of this track is adapted from the track "Nannede Shruthiyalli". The song "Ee Mani" is a duck mix while Upendra wake-ups and dances in the early morning at his room. The songs "Deepavali" and "Neene Ee Kanna" are not featured in the film.

== Release ==
Initially, the audio launch was scheduled on 1 June 2012 on Palace Grounds, Bengaluru but was postponed due to "India closed". The audio launch was held in Chancery Hotel, Bengaluru on 13 June 2012. While the music composer made an appearance at the event, the cast and crew of the film, veteran actor Ambareesh, top composers and lyricists of the Kannada film industry were also present at the occasion. Singers Vijay Prakash, Shweta Mohan and Naresh Iyer each performed one song live at the event. The audio rights were acquired by Samartha Ventures' label Ashwini Media Networks. The soundtrack album received generally positive reviews from critics. Rahman was nominated for the Best Music Director category in the 2nd SIIMA Awards.

== Track listing ==
The complete track listing was revealed on A. R. Rahman's official website on 28 May 2012. All lyrics written by K. Kalyan, except where noted.

Track list
No.	Title	Artist(s)	Length
1.	"Aalapane Mellane" (Rap lyrics: Blaaze)	Abhay Jodhpurkar, Maria Roe Vincent, Blaaze	3:53
2.	"Sanchari Manasu"	Nivas, Swetha Mohan	5:32
3.	"Laali Laali Amma"	Naresh Iyer	6:17
4.	"Sarigama Sangamave"	Swetha Mohan, Megha	3:44
5.	"Deepavali"	Abhay Jodhpurkar, Sonu Kakkar, Apoorva, Swetha Majethiya, Arun Haridas Kamath	5:38
6.	"Nannede Sruthiyalli" (Lyrics: Devappa Hassan)	Vijay Prakash, Chinmayi	6:33
7.	"Neene Ee Kanna" (Lyrics: Kaviraj)	Abhay Jodhpurkar, Chinmayi	6:03
8.	"Oh Oh Ee Mani" (Lyrics: Blaaze)	Suresh Peters, Blaaze	4:07
Total length:			41:37

== Personnel ==
Backing Vocals

- Nannede Shruthiyalli – Ghulam Murtaza Khan, Ghulam Qadir Khan, Renuka, Pooja, Prof. Srini on Hindustani bols and Srinivas on Sollukattu
- Deepavali (Kids Chorus) – Sai, Vignesh, Shyam, Jakshman, Rishi

Personnel

- Mridangam – Seenu
- Ghatam – Karthik
- Pakhavaj – Sreeni, Yograj

Sound engineers

Suresh Perumal, Hentry Kuruvilla, Srinidhi Venkatesh, Jerry Vincent, Pradeep, Kannan Ganpat, Karthik, Dinesh Ramalingam

Mixing and mastering

S. Sivakumar

Additional mixing

T. R. Krishna Chetan

Vocal Supervision

V. J. Srinivasa Murthy, Srinivas Doraisamy

Musician's fixer

R. Samidurai

== Accolades ==
Ceremony	Category	Nominee	Result
Udaya Film Awards	Best Music Director	A. R. Rahman	Nominated
SIIMA Awards	Best Music Director	A. R. Rahman	Nominated
South Scope Awards	Best Music Director	A. R. Rahman	Nominated
South Scope Awards	Best Album	A. R. Rahman	Nominated
South Scope Awards	Best Album (Listener's Choice)	A. R. Rahman	Nominated
