= People Like Us (soundtrack) =

People Like Us: Original Motion Picture Soundtrack

Soundtrack album by A.R. Rahman
- Released: June 19, 2012
- Recorded: Sony Pictures Studios, California; Panchathan Hollywood Studio, Los Angeles
- Genre: Film Score
- Length: 49:58
- Label: Lakeshore

A.R. Rahman chronology
Godfather (2012)	People Like Us: Original Motion Picture Soundtrack (2012)	Jab Tak Hai Jaan (2012)

People Like Us: Original Motion Picture Soundtrack is the soundtrack to Alex Kurtzman's 2012 film of the same name. It is composed by Academy Award-winning composer A.R. Rahman whose last successful international release was 127 Hours. Rahman began recording the patch work of score in 2011 and the score was completed by late September 2011. The Original Motion Picture Soundtrack was released on June 19, 2012, under the label Lakeshore Records.

== Background ==
In an interview, Rahman stated his desire to score for an intense emotional American film which got completed through this film. He added that the score was challenging for him as the script emphasized affectionate feels between a family specifically on sibling relations. It was necessary that the score must neither sound romantic nor put people into too much negative emotions since mild and minimal sound arrangements were present. Rahman introduced deliberate nuanced imperfections in the score, like all the imperfections that the characters have in the film and yet having a lot of beauty and hope in it. The soundtrack includes an end credits theme song named "Dotted Line" sung by Liz Phair who had co-written the song with the composer. The song highlights the music composer's rich orchestral score with the singer's acoustic guitar strums, mostly. Phair, keeping the script and three main characters in mind, penned the lyrics partially in just one night after listening to the base score "Dotted Line". She stated the song as lullabying with repetitive word 'Na Na' since the song brings out missing sort of feelings in lives of characters which was to be recreated in the movie.

People Like Us is such a special and rare movie for me to score. A big thanks to Alex Kurtzman for making me do this! It's my first working with the Dreamworks team and was such a pleasure. — A. R. Rahman

== Track list ==
No.	Title	Artist(s)	Length
1.	"People Like Us"	A. R. Rahman	2:10
2.	"New York to L.A."	A. R. Rahman	2:07
3.	"Dad's Studio"	A. R. Rahman	3:23
4.	"Dad's Shaving Kit"	A. R. Rahman	1:59
5.	"Following Frankie"	A. R. Rahman	1:24
6.	"Frankie's Burning Desire"	A. R. Rahman	2:06
7.	"Beat the Living"	A. R. Rahman	1:41
8.	"Welcome to People"	A. R. Rahman	2:49
9.	"Mom"	A. R. Rahman	2:20
10.	"Tacos"	A. R. Rahman	3:52
11.	"Discount Prom Dress"	A. R. Rahman	3:58
12.	"Airport Adventures"	A. R. Rahman, Michael "Nomad" Ripoll	3:45
13.	"Six Rules"	A. R. Rahman	2:23
14.	"Breakfast for Mom / Just Be People"	A. R. Rahman	4:54
15.	"Crab Drumming / Finding Sam"	A. R. Rahman	1:15
16.	"I Am Your Brother"	A. R. Rahman	2:42
17.	"Family Pictures"	A. R. Rahman	2:32
18.	"Dotted Line"	Liz Phair	4:37
Total length:			49:58

== Personnel ==
Credits adapted from A. R. Rahman's official website.

Personnel

- Violins : Bruce Dukov, Charlie Bisharat, Belinda Broughton, Darius Campo, Julie Ann Gigante, Tamara Hatwan, Ana Landauer, Natalie Leggett, Dimitrie Leivici, Phillip Levy, Maya Magub, Helen Nightengale, Alyssa Park, Katia Popov, Neil Samples, Jeanne Skrocki, Lisa M. Sutton, Josefina Vergara, Shalini Vijayan, Miwako Watanabe
- Violas: Brian Dembow, Robert Brophy, Andrew Duckles, Alma Fernandez, Keith Greene, Shawn Mann, Darrin McCann, David Walther
- Bass: Michael Valerio, Nico Abondolo, Carmine, Timothy Lefebvre, Edward Meares
- Flute: David Shostac, Heather Clark
- Cello: Steve Erdody, Erika Duke-Kirpatrick, Dennis Karmazyn, Armen Ksajikian, Timothy Landauer, Dana Little, Andrew Shulman
- Clarinets: Stuart Clark, Donald Foster
- Horns: James Thatcher, Daniel Kelly, Jenny Kim
- Percussions: Alan Estes, Michael Shapiro, Donald Williams
- Keyboard: Randy Kerber
- Guitars: George Doering, Michael Ripoll, Thom Rotella, Joel Shearer
- Harp: Jo Ann Turovsky
- Accordion: Guy Allen Klucevsek, Michael Watta
- Harmonica: Jimmie Wood
- Glass armonica: William Zeitler

Production

- Producer: A. R. Rahman
- Mastering:
  - Louie Teran at Marcussen Mastering Studios, Los Angeles
  - DNA Mastering, Glendale, CA
- Additional arrangement: Kazimir Boyle
- Sound engineers:
  - Satoshi Noguchi, Tony Joy, Viviane Chaix, Cory Bice (at Panchathan Hollywood Studios)
- Music editor: Erich Stratmann
- Orchestrator: Matt Dunkley
- Music Contractor: Peter Rotter
- Mixing: Alan Meyerson (at Panchathan Hollywood Studios)
- DreamWorks Music Executive: Jennifer Hawks
- DreamWorks Music Co-ordinators: Tori Fillat, Christopher Hogenson
- Music Supervisor: Liza Richardson
- Music Clearance: Julie Sessing
- Soundtrack album executive producers: Skip Williamson, Brian McNelis
- Director of A&R: Eric Craig
