= Dinesh Kanagaratnam =

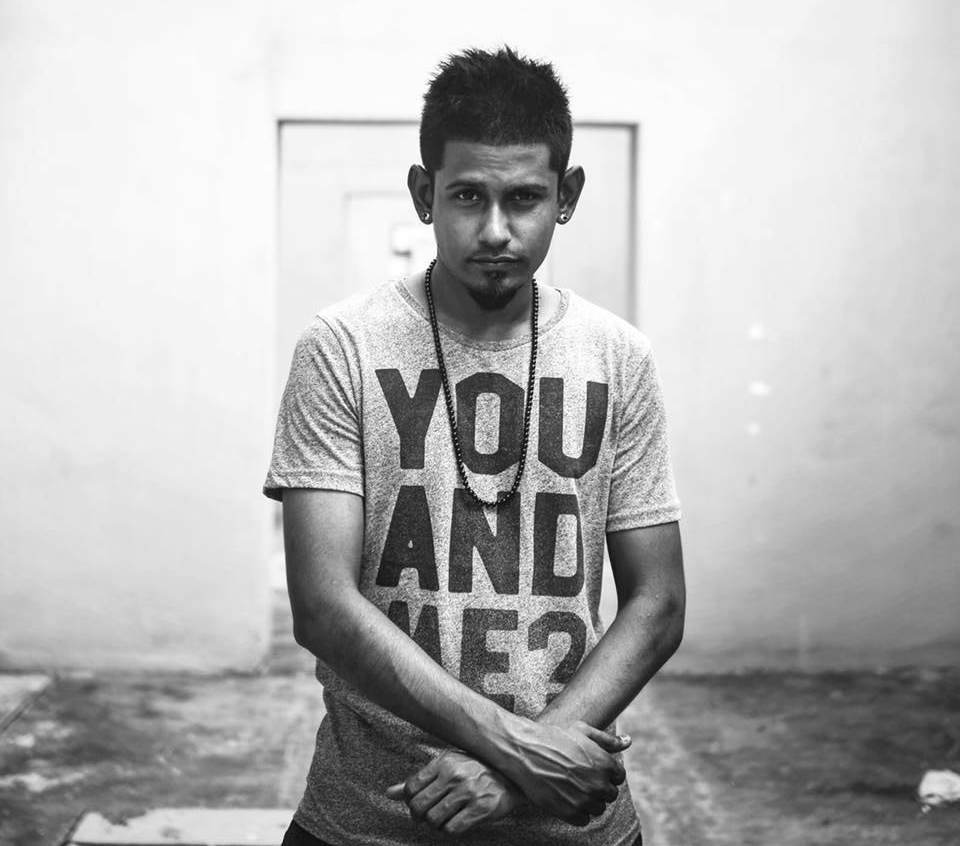

Background information
- Born: 31 August 1981 (age 45); Badulla, Sri Lanka
- Origin: Sri Lanka
- Genres: Hip hop, R&B
- Occupations: Music producer, rapper, playback singer
- Years active: 2004–present

Aaryan Dinesh Kanagaratnam (born 31 August 1981), also known by his initials A. D. K. or simply Dinesh Kanagaratnam, is a Sri Lankan R&B and hip hop artist and music producer who has composed tracks in Tamil language. He also often collaborates with music directors in Tamil cinema as a playback singer.

== Early life and career ==
Dinesh was born in Badulla and raised in Modara, Sri Lanka. He studied information technology (IT) in Trichy, Tamil Nadu, India and started teaching IT courses in Sri Lanka. He began working with local musicians part-time to pursue his growing interest in music. In 2004, he was given a chance by Bathiya, an artist in Sri Lanka and started recording rap songs until he was discovered by Vijay Antony. He collaborated with him for the song "Aathichudi" for the soundtrack of the film TN 07 AL 4777 (2008) in 2009 which is a remake of Surangani, a song from his first independent album, Tamizha (2008). Back in Sri Lanka, he did a cross-culture album in 2005 which includes songs in Tamil, Sinhala and English.

His next throughout in cinema industry was "Magudi", which was his first collaboration with A. R. Rahman for the Mani Ratnam-directed film Kadal (2013). He was featured along with Anirudh Ravichander for the song "Mun Sellada" in the film Manithan (2016), composed by Santhosh Narayanan. Kanagaratnam and rapper Sri Rascol formed a record label called Rap Machines and have done other rap musics.

He continued to work in Tamil and Telugu cinema, writing and performing English language rap for soundtracks, including the title track "Maayon" in Mersal (2017) composed by A. R. Rahman, the song "Gala Gala" featured with Megha from Race Gurram composed by S. Thaman and also a background score (which had been deleted later) in Nerkonda Paarvai. He also worked in 2.0 (2018). Kanagaratnam has joined concert tours in Sri Lanka, the Middle East, India, Malaysia and Singapore. He is well known for his rap battles at every A. R. Rahman concert tours alongside Lady Kash and Blaaze. In January 2019, Kanagaratnam performed with Bathiya and Santhush at Oba Nisa in Sri Lanka.

== Discography ==
=== Albums ===
| Year | Album | Song(s) | Composer | Ref |
|---|---|---|---|---|
| 2005 | Cross Culture | "Naan Sonnal" | Dinesh Kanagaratnam | |
| 2007 | Cross Culture | "Cross Culture" | Dinesh Kanagaratnam | |
| 2008 | Tamizha | "Surangani Remake" | Dinesh Kanagaratnam | |
| 2012 | Aaryan | "Goka Pearu" | Dinesh Kanagaratnam | |
| 2012 | Aaryan | "Kuruvi" | Dinesh Kanagaratnam | |
| 2012 | Aaryan | "Hollaback Muniamma" | Dinesh Kanagaratnam | |
| 2012 | Aaryan | "You Ate My Money" | Dinesh Kanagaratnam | |

=== Independent tracks ===
| Year | Song(s) | Composer | Ref |
|---|---|---|---|
| 2009 | "Nagara Vaytai" | Shabir | |
| 2009 | "Kuruvi" | Dinesh Kanagaratnam, Charles Bosco | |
| 2011 | "Dhoomi Dhaala" | | |
| 2015 | "Uyir Poo" | Deyo | |
| 2016–present | "AYM Tribute" | D Navigator | |
| 2016–present | "Vellai Poove" | Deyo | |
| 2016–present | "Maayavi" | Deyo | |
| 2016–present | "Pudhiya Era" | D Navigator | |
| 2016–present | "Hollaback Muaniamma 2" | | |
| 2017 | "Yeanadi Penne" | Chamath Sangeeth | |
| 2018 | "Kannaley Kollathey" | Puven | |
| 2019 | "Poraali" | Ash | |
| 2019 | "2.0 X Petta Mashup" | AllanPreetham | |

=== Playback singing ===
| Year | Title | Song | Composer | Language | Co-singer(s) |
|---|---|---|---|---|---|
| 2009 | TN-07 AL 4777 | "Aathichudi" | Vijay Antony | Tamil | Vijay Antony |
| 2009 | Vettaikaran | "Oru Chinna Thamarai" | Vijay Antony | Tamil | Krish, Suchitra, Bonekilla |
| 2009 | Odipolama | "Odipalama" | D. Imman | Tamil | Arati Anklikar |
| 2010 | Kattradhu Kalavu | "Kattradhu Kalavu" | Paul. J | Tamil | Blaaze |
| 2012 | Kadal | "Magudi Magudi" | A. R. Rahman | Tamil | Chinmayi, Tanvi Shah |
| 2014 | Lingaa | "Oh Nanba" | A. R. Rahman | Tamil | S. P. Balasubrahmanyam |
| 2014 | Burma | "Vaddi" | Sudharshan M Kumar | Tamil | Tupakeys (MC Rude, MC Akram) |
| 2014 | Race Gurram | "Gala Gala" | S. Thaman | Telugu | Megha |
| 2015 | Rajinimurugan | "Yennama Ipadi Panreengalaema (Imman Mix)" | D. Imman | Tamil | D. Imman |
| 2015 | O Kadhal Kanmani | "Kaara Attakkaaraa" | A. R. Rahman | Tamil | Darshana KT, Shashaa Tirupati |
| 2016 | Achcham Yenbadhu Madamaiyada | "Showkali" | A. R. Rahman | Tamil | Aditya Rao, Sri Rascol |
| 2016 | Achcham Yenbadhu Madamaiyada | "Thalli Pogadhey" | A. R. Rahman | Tamil | Sid Sriram, Aparna Narayanan |
| 2016 | Sahasam Swasaga Sagipo | "Showkalli" | A. R. Rahman | Telugu | Aditya Rao, Sri Rascol |
| 2016 | Sahasam Swasaga Sagipo | "Vellipomaakey" | A. R. Rahman | Telugu | Sid Sriram, Aparna Narayanan |
| 2016 | Manithan | "Mun Sellada" | Santhosh Narayanan | Tamil | Anirudh Ravichander |
| 2016 | Si3 | "Universal Cop" | Harris Jayaraj | Tamil | Christopher Stanley, Krish |
| 2017 | Mersal | "Maayon" (Title Track & BGM) | A. R. Rahman | Tamil | |
| 2018 | 7UP Madras Gig | "Veera Thamizhan" | D. Imman | Tamil | D. Imman, Nithyasree Mahadevan |
| 2018 | Vedigundu Pasangge | "Vedingu Pasangge" | Vivek-Mervin | Tamil | Teejay Arunasalam |
| 2019 | Sindhubaadh | "Rockstar Robber" | Yuvan Shankar Raja | Tamil | Pav Bundy |
| 2024 | Romeo | "Aiyo Ma" | Barath Dhanasekar | Tamil | also lyricist |
| TBA | Dhruva Natchathiram | "Ranagala Veeran Ragamane Dheeran" | Harris Jayaraj | Tamil | |

=== Composer ===
- 18 Vayasu (2012)

== Television ==
| Year | Show | Role | Channel | Notes |
|---|---|---|---|---|
| 2022-2023 | Bigg Boss (Tamil season 6) | Contestant | Star Vijay | Sacrificed Day 98 |
