= Shakthisree Gopalan =

Indian singer

- Born: 25 October 1987 (age 38)
- Genres: Pop; R'n'B; Jazz; Playback singing; Indian Classical Music
- Occupations: Singer; Lyricist; Composer; Activist
- Instruments: Guitar; Vocals
- Years active: 2008–present
- Formerly of: Off The Record, Pyjama Conspiracy
- Website: shakthisreegopalan.com

Shakthisree Gopalan is an Indian vocalist, composer, songwriter and performer, famous for her collaborations with the music composers like A.R. Rahman. Aside from the film music, she is a regular in the independent music scene, performing with various bands over the years dabbling in Pop, R'n'B, trip-hop and jazz.

== Early life and education ==
Shakthisree Gopalan was brought up in Kochi, Kerala. She did her schooling in Rajagiri Public School, Kalamassery. She moved to Chennai after her school and pursued her degree in architecture at the Anna University's School of Architecture and Planning.

She was trained in Carnatic music for 13 years. During her 11th standard, SS Music conducted Voice Hunt 1. Since she was under 18, it ended with the auditions. Eventually in 2008, she won the second season of SS Music's Voice Hunt. She was first auditioned in November 2008 and got the opportunity to sing her debut song for the film TN 07 AL 4777.

== Career ==
=== 2008–2012: Career beginnings and playback debut ===
At the age of 13, Shakthisree Gopalan was already trained in the field of Carnatic music and rock. After having won the "SS Music Voice Hunt " title in the year 2008, Gopalan debuted into film playback in the same year in Vijay Antony's TN 07 AL 4777. She subsequently went on to record a number of songs for films such as Rajadhi Raja, Irumbukkottai Murattu Singam and Naan. She was placed third in the Chennai Live's Band hunt. In the year 2014, she performed in MCC (Madras Christian College) cultural fest at Deepwoods and National Institute of Technology, Tiruchirappalli cultural fest Festember, SASTRA University cultural fest Kuruksastra'14, VIT University cultural fest Riviera 14 and Madras Institute of Technology cultural fest Mitafest 15.

"Off the Record" consists of Vikram Vivekanand (Guitar), Satish Narayanan (Bass) and Tapas Naresh/Vinay Ramakrishnan (Drums).

=== 2012–2016: Mainstream success ===
Shakthisree met A.R. Rahman when she got an assignment to design his music school, KM Music Conservatory. It was around that time she shared the music she had composed with him and got to sing 'Nenjukkulle' for the movie Kadal, which would catapult her into the spotlight. Although it was the first song of the duo's now long-lived collaboration, the eponymous title track for the composer's Bollywood film, Jab Tak Hai Jaan (2012) which they recorded after "Nenjukkulle", would release before it.

The string of major successes that followed includes her works on Raja Rani, Madras, Anegan, Kaaki Sattai, Kanchana 2 among others. Not one to be confined to a single language, she also began her foray into the Telugu and Malayalam playback industries, finding just as much success in dubbed versions of Raja Rani and Kanchana 2, and Charlie.

=== 2016–present: Song releases ===
She also released 'By Your Side' in December 2016, in which she collaborated with Hari Dafusia, a Toronto-based keyboardist-producer, and Nigel Roopnarine, a bass player. Apart from playback singing for movies, she also collaborated with Prashanth and released an indie single called Begin in November 2017.

She recorded the song Aga Naga for A. R. Rahman in the film Ponniyin Selvan, which was first used as a short background song in the first part of the movie. The song gained immense popularity among the audiences upon release of the first part. The entire song was then released as part of the main soundtrack of the second part.

=== 2024–present: Debut as a composer ===
She is set to debut as a music composer in January 2024 for the film The Test directed by S. Sashikanth and starring Madhavan, Nayanthara, Siddharth, and Meera Jasmine. Music composer A. R. Rahman announced her debut as music director on Twitter on 4 May 2023.

== Discography ==
=== Composer ===
List of composer credits
Year	Title	Language
2025	Test	Tamil

=== Cover singer ===
List of cover singing credits
Year	Song	Co-artists	Original Artist	Ref.
2014	"Crazy"	Michael Dias, Cherian K K	Gnarls Barkley	
2015	"Nocturne"	Michael Dias, Cherian K K	Pentagram	
2017	"Caramel"		Susan Vega, Chiara Civello	
2021	"I'd Rather Go Blind"	Vikram Vivekanand, Conrad Simmons	Etta James	
2021	"Summertime"	David Joseph, Naveen Napier, Shyam Benjamin	George Gershwin	
2021	"Naima" (1959)	David Joseph, Naveen Napier, Shyam Benjamin	John Coltrane	

=== Independent singer ===
List of singing credits
Year	Song	Co-artists	Ref.
2011	"Little Star"	Shyam Benjamin	
2012	"Voices"		
2016	"By Your Side"	Dafusia	
2017	"Begin"	Prashanth Techno	
2018	"Phir Wahin"		
2019	"Wake Up"	Prashanth Techno	
2020	"Cycle Gap"		
2020	"Birds and the Bees"	Alfie	
2021	"Nee Pothumey"	Akshay Yesodharan	
2021	"Litle Star" (10 years remix)	Shyam Benjamin, David Joseph and Naveen Napier	
2022	"Love is..."	Sio Tepper	
2023	"Old Friend"		
2024	"Rekka"	Vathshan Uthayakumar	
2024	"Thozhiye"	Sahi Siva	

=== Playback singer ===
Source:

=== Tamil ===
List of Tamil film playback singing credits
Year	Title	Song	Composer	Co-Singers
2008	TN 07 AL 4777	"Sorgam Madhuvile"	Vijay Antony	Rahul Nambiar
2009	Rajadhi Raja	"Yelantha Pazham"	Karunas	Dinesh
2009	Vettaikaaran	"En Uchimandai"	Vijay Antony	Krishna Iyer, Shoba Chandrasekhar, Charulatha Mani
2010	Irumbu Kottai Murattu Singam	"Raja Sindinesm"	G. V. Prakash Kumar	Rahul Nambiar, Big Nikk
2010	Kattradhu Kalavu	"Sudhandiram"	Paul J	
2010	Dam 999	"Everyday"	Ouseppachan	Ouseppachan
2010	Dam 999	"Dakkanaga"	Ouseppachan	Suchith Suresan, Ouseppachan
2011	Naan	"Makkayala"	Vijay Antony	Krishan Maheson, Mark Thomas
2012	Konjam Koffee Konjam Kaadhal	"Uyir Thozha"	Phani Kalyan	
2012	Kadal	"Nenjukkulle"	A. R. Rahman	A.R. Rahman
2012	Haridas	"Vazhkaiye"	Vijay Antony	Maalavika Manoj, GNR Kumar
2012	Maryan	"Enga Pona Raasa"	A. R. Rahman	
2013	Irandaam Ulagam	"Mannavane"	Harris Jayaraj	Gopal Rao
2013	Raja Rani	"Angnyaade"	G. V. Prakash Kumar	
2013	Raja Rani	"Imaye Imaye"	G. V. Prakash Kumar	G. V. Prakash Kumar
2013	Aarambam	"Hare Rama"	Yuvan Shankar Raja	Tanvi Shah
2014	Aaha Kalyanam	"Padhiye Padhiye"	Dharan Kumar	
2014	Velmurugan Borewells	"Sathamilla Muttu Pola"	Srikanth Deva	
2014	Malini 22 Palayamkottai	"Vinmeengal"	Aravind–Shankar	
2014	Madras	"Naan Nee"	Santhosh Narayanan	Dhee
2014	Vizhi Moodi Yosithaal	"Saala Saloothey"	B.Aathif	Deepak, Vikram
2014	Vaayai Moodi Pesavum	"Kadhal Ara Onnu Vizundhuchu"	Sean Roldan	Sean Roldan
2015	Anegan	"Thodu Vaanam"	Harris Jayaraj	Hariharan
2015	Kaaki Sattai	"Kadhal Kan Kattudhe"	Anirudh Ravichander	Anirudh Ravichander
2015	Mahabalipuram	"Usrey Nee"	K	Imman
2015	Agathinai	"Ilaigalile Sadugudu Nadathuthu"	Maria Manohar	Maria Manohar
2015	Kanchana 2	"Vaaya En Veera"	Leon James	
2015	Vasuvum Saravananum Onna Padichavanga	"Adada Onnum Solladha"	D Imman	Benny Dayal
2015	Maya	"Thoonga Kangal"	Ron Ethan Yohann	
2015	Vedalam	"Don't You Mess With Me"	Anirudh Ravichander	Shruti Haasan
2015	Eetti	"Naan Pudicha Mosakuttiye"	G.V. Prakash Kumar	G. V. Prakash Kumar
2016	Azhagu Kutty Chellam	"Azhagu Kutty Chellam"	Ved Shanker Sugavanam	
2016	24	"Aararo"	A. R. Rahman	
2016	Thirunaal	"Ore Oru Vaanam"	Srikanth Deva	Mahalakshmi Iyer
2017	Dhayam	"Kolai Ondrey"	Sathish Selvam	
2017	Sangili Bungili Kadhava Thorae	"Hai En Kai Mela"	Vishal Chandrasekhar	Anirudh Ravichander
2017	Vikram Vedha	"Yaanji Yaanji"	Sam C. S.	Anirudh Ravichander, D. Sathyaprakash
2017	Aval	"Kaarigai Kanne"	Girishh	Vijay Prakash
2017	Velaikkaran	"Vaa Velaikkara"	Anirudh Ravichander	Bjorn Surrao
2018	Chekka Chivantha Vaanam	"Bhoomi Bhoomi"	A. R. Rahman	
2018	Chekka Chivantha Vaanam	"Kalla Kalavani"	A. R. Rahman	Lady Kash
2019	Dev	"Oru Nooru Murai"	Harris Jayaraj	D. Sathyaprakash
2019	The Lion King (dubbed)	"Vaazhkaiye Vattamaai/Nants' Ingonyama"	Elton John	
2020	Odavum Mudiyadhu Oliyavum Mudiyadhu	"Magave"	Kaushik Krish	
2020	Dharala Prabhu	"Payanangal"	Bharath Shankar	
2021	Oh Manapenne	"Nee Yenadharuginil Nee"	Vishal Chandrasekhar	
2021	Kaathu Vaakula Rendu Kaadhal	"Rendu Kadhal"	Anirudh Ravichander	Anirudh Ravichander, Aishwarya Suresh Bindra
2023	Pathu Thala	"Ninaivirukka"	A. R. Rahman	A. R. Ameen
2023	Ponniyin Selvan: II	"Aga Naga"	A. R. Rahman	
2023	Maamannan	"Nenjame Nenjame"	A. R. Rahman	Vijay Yesudas
2023	Iraivan	"Idhu Pola"	Yuvan Shankar Raja	Yuvan Shankar Raja
2023	Leo	"Villain Yaaru"	Anirudh Ravichander	Anirudh Ravichander
2023	Minmini	"Iru Perum Nadhigal"	Khatija Rahman	
2023	Blue Star	"Railin Oligal"	Govind Vasantha	Pradeep Kumar
2024	Singappenney	"Idha Thane Ethir Paathen"	Kumaran Sivamani	
2024	Laandhar	"Ayalpirai"	M. S. Prraveen	
2024	Lover	"Thaensudarae"	Sean Roldan	Sean Roldan
2024	Emakku Thozhil Romance	"Vaada Poda (Reprise)"	Nivas K. Prasanna	
2025	Niram Marum Ulagil	"Aazhi"	Dev Prakash Regan	
2025	Test	"Hope"	Shakthisree Gopalan	
2025	Test	"Lullaby"	Shakthisree Gopalan	
2025	Test	"Hope" (Remix)	Shakthisree Gopalan	Kunal Merchant
2025	Thug Life	"Jinguchaa"	A. R. Rahman	Vaishali Samant, Adithya RK
2025	Others	"Oru Paarvai Paarthavanae"	Ghibran	Namitha Babu
2025	Yellow	"Megangal"	Cliffy Chris & Anand Kashinath	
2026	Thalaivar Thambi Thalaimaiyil	"Poyi Vaadi"	Vishnu Vijay	

=== Malayalam ===
List of film playback singing credits in Malayalam
Year	Title	Song	Composer
2013	KQ	"Chenthalire"	Stephen Devassy
2013	Camel Safari	"Suruma Suruma"	Deepankuran
2013	Pattam Pole	"Hey Vennila"	M. Jayachandran
2014	Samsaaram Aarogyathinu Haanikaram	"Thammil Oru Vaaku"	Sean Roldan
2014	Mr. Fraud	"Poonthikale"	Gopi Sundar
2015	Neena	"Remember You"	Nikhil J Menon
2015	Charlie	"Pularikalo"	Gopi Sunder
2016	Jalam	"Koodu Vekkan"	Ouseppachan
2016	Jalam	"Yathra Manoramayude"	Ouseppachan
2016	Jalam	"Bhoomiyil Enganum"	Ouseppachan
2017	Adventures of Omanakuttan	"Ilamai"	Arun
2017	Villain	"Angkale"	4 Musics
2018	Hey Jude	"Nishashalabame"	M. Jayachandran
2018	Parole	"Ilakalayi Pookalayi"	Evelyn
2018	Mandharam	"Pulari Mazhakal"	Mujeeb Majeed
2019	Uyare	"Kaatil"	Gopi Sundar
2019	Saaho (dubbed)	"Ekantha Thaarame"	Guru Randhawa
2022	Thallumaala	"Tupathu"	Vishnu Vijay
2023	Ponniyin Selvan: II	"Akamalar"	A. R. Rahman
2023	Falimy	"Karayaruthe"	Vishnu Vijay
2024	Premalu	"Welcome to Hyderabad"	Vishnu Vijay
2025	Sarvam Maya	"Puthu Mazha"	Justin Prabhakaran
2026	Patriot	"Manushyan"	Sushin Shyam

=== Telugu ===
List of film playback singing credits in Telugu
Year	Title	Song	Composer
2014	Raja Rani (dubbed)	"Ayyare Ayyare"	G. V. Prakash Kumar
2014	Raja Rani (dubbed)	"Vinave Vinave"	G. V. Prakash Kumar
2014	Maine Pyar Kiya	"Shwaase Nuvve"	Pradeep Kumar
2015	Kanchana 2 (dubbed)	"Reppakela Vodharpu"	Leon James
2016	Ghatana	"Nakosam"	Aravind–Shankar
2017	Mental Madhilo	"Oohale"	Prashanth R Vihari
2018	Yuddam Saranam	"Yelugula Taraley"	Vivek Sagar
2018	Nawab (dubbed)	"Bhaga Bhaga"	A. R. Rahman
2018	Nawab (dubbed)	"Nannu Nammanee"	A. R. Rahman
2019	Suryakantham	"Nenena Nenena"	Mark K Robin
2019	Jersey	"Padhe Padhe"	Anirudh Ravichander
2019	The Lion King (dubbed)	"Jeevana Chakkram/Nants' Ingonyama"	Elton John
2021	Eakam	"Yekkadi Maanusha Janmam"	Jose Franklin
2023	Ponniyin Selvan: II	"Aaganandhe"	A. R. Rahman
2023	Samajavaragamana	"Humsafar"	Gopi Sundar
2023	Hi Nanna	"Ammaadi"	Hesham Abdul Wahab
2023	Hi Nanna	"Asalelaa"	Hesham Abdul Wahab
2025	Patang	"Tai Tai Tai"	Jose Jimmy
2026	Bad Boy Karthik	"Pommante"	Harris Jayaraj

=== Other languages ===
List of film playback singing credits in other languages
Year	Title	Song	Language	Composer
2012	Jab Tak Hai Jaan	"Jab Tak Hai Jaan"	Hindi	A. R. Rahman
2014	Chaturbhuja	"Ee Tharadha Jothegara"	Kannada	Poornachandra Tejaswi
2016	Single	"By Your Side"	English	Hari Dafusia, Nigel Roopnarine
2017	Single	"Begin"	English	Prashanth
2023	Sapta Sagaradaache Ello - Side A	"Kanmaraye Kaade"	Kannada	Charan Raj

== Filmography ==
=== As a dubbing artist ===
List of film dubbing credits
Year	Title	Language	Dubbing for
2013	Kadal	Tamil	Lakshmi Manchu
2013	Annayum Rasoolum	Malayalam	Andrea Jeremiah
2021	Maara	Tamil	Shraddha Srinath
2021	Nizhal	Malayalam	Nayanthara
2025	Sarvam Maya	Malayalam	Preity Mukundan

== Awards and nominations ==
She has won the Filmfare Award for Best Female Playback Singer – Tamil and the Vijay Award for Best Female Playback Singer for singing "Nenjukkulle" from Kadal.

Following is a list of Awards won by Shakthisree

- Won – Femina Award-Women of Power
- Won – Filmfare Award for Best Female Playback Singer – Tamil – "Nenjukkulle" – Kadal
- Won – Radio Mirchi Music Awards Vocalist of the Year
- Won – SIIMA Award Best Playback Singer Female Tamil
- Won – The Pride of Tamil Nadu Award
- Won – Vijay Award for Best Female Playback Singer – "Nenjukkulle" – Kadal
- Won – SIIMA Award for Best Female Playback Singer – Telugu – "Ammaadi" – Hi Nanna
- Nominated – Filmfare Award for Best Female Playback Singer – Tamil – "Naan Nee" – Madras
- Nominated-Filmfare Award for Best Female Playback Singer – Tamil – "Bhoomi Bhoomi" – Chekka Chivantha Vaanam
- Nominated – Filmfare Award for Best Female Playback Singer – Telugu – "Ammaadi" – Hi Nanna
- Nominated – Filmfare Award for Best Female Playback Singer – Tamil – "Aga Naga" – Ponniyin Selvan: II
- Nominated – Filmfare Award for Best Female Playback Singer – Tamil – "Nenjame Nenjame" – Maamannan
- Nominated – SIIMA Award for Best Female Playback Singer – Tamil – "Bhoomi Bhoomi" – Chekka Chivantha Vaanam
- Nominated – Vijay Award for Best Female Playback Singer – "Naan Nee" – Madras
