= Surangani (song) =

Baila song popularized across South Asia

"Surangani" was originally a Sinhalese Baila song.

== Background ==
The song was composed in 6/8.

Lyrics	Transliteration	English Translation
සුරාංගනී සුරාංගනී සුරංගනීට මාළු ගෙනාවා මාළු මාළු මාළු මේ දැන් ගෙනාපු මාළු සුරංගනීට මාළු ගෙනාවා	Surangani Surangani Suranganita malu genawaa Maalu maalu malu Dan genapu malu Suranganita malu genawa	“Surangani, Surangani, Surangani, I bring you fish. Fish, fish, fish. The fish I bring you is freshly caught. Surangani, I bring you fish.”

== Other versions ==
A. E. Manoharan did a bilingual rendition of the song in Sinhala and Tamil, which became quite popular in Tamil Nadu, mainly due to Radio Ceylon. His renditions of both the Sinhala original version and the bilingual version were popular in India. It has featured in translated versions in several Indian movies. Ilayaraja then made a Tamil version – which had very little to do with the Sinhala version except for the refrain – for the Tamil film Avar Enakke Sontham (1977), sung by Malaysia Vasudevan and Renuka. This became popular around secondary schools and colleges in Chennai. Tamil students took it to other universities around India. In Hindi, it was sung by Asha Bhosle in Parmatma (1978), which also had very little to do with the Sinhala version except for the refrain.

A Goan, Konkani version was also made, and many people in India mistakenly believed this was the original.

Manoharan also did a bilingual Sinhala / Malayalam rendition, which talks about Sundaram Keralam (transl. Beautiful/green Kerala).

The song is in the 6/8 time signature. The song was remixed by Vijay Antony in 2008 Tamil film Pandhayam.

Dinesh Kanagaratnam created a trilingual remix of the song in Sinhala, Tamil, and English with a different tune for his 2008 album Tamizha titled "Surangani Remake". The song, which was produced by Pasan Liyanage, was popular in Sri Lanka.
