= Rajadhi Raja (2009 film) =

2009 Indian Tamil film

- DVD cover
- Directed by: Sakthi Chidambaram
- Written by: Sakthi Chidambaram
- Produced by: Radha Sakthi Chidambaram
- Starring: Raghava Lawrence; Mumtaj; Snigdha Akolkar; Kamna Jethmalani; Meenakshi
- Cinematography: Suresh Devan
- Edited by: V. Jai Shankar
- Music by: Songs: Karunas; Background music: Paul Jacob
- Production company: Cinema Paradise
- Distributed by: Cinema Paradise
- Release date: 15 May 2009
- Running time: 158 minutes
- Country: India
- Language: Tamil

Rajadhi Raja (transl. King of Kings) is a 2009 Indian Tamil-language masala film written and directed by Sakthi Chidambaram. It stars Raghava Lawrence, Mumtaj, Snigdha Akolkar, Kamna Jethmalani, Meenakshi, and Karunas. The film was released on 15 May 2009.

== Plot ==
Raja (Raghava Lawrence) is a native of Coutrallam. Tragedy strikes his adolescent life when his father loses his hand when a doctor in an inebriated condition operates on him. The doctor, fearing legal consequences, bribes the local police to take care of the issue. A young Raja witnesses police brutality on his father, causing his latter's death. On his deathbed, his father gets a promise from Raja that he will turn his three brothers into a police officer, a lawyer, and a doctor. Raja realizes his mission and stops his studies to earn money to make his brothers into what he promised. The brothers are provided shelter and food by a local elderly woman (Paravai Muniyamma) whom Raja affectionately calls Paatti (transl. grandmother). She has a granddaughter Lakshmi (Neelima Rani), whom Raja considers as his sister.

Now, Raja, in his adulthood, works as a bus driver, while his three brothers become a doctor, a police officer, and a lawyer as per his father's wish. One day, Lakshmi complains to him about eve-teasers who tried to misbehave with her. Raja dismisses the claim and asks her to attend. She convinces him to come with her. On seeing her, a group of male college students give remarks about Lakshmi's physique and proceed to molest her. Enraged by this, Raja fights and chases them away warning others to stay away from Lakshmi.

Raja is often kidnapped by Thangapazham (Meenakshi), who expresses her love for him and tries to woo him repeatedly. Raja escapes from her while she is distracted. However, Raja's friend Krishnamoorthy (Karunas) in turn expresses his love to Thangapazham, which she blatantly ignores. Meanwhile, Shailaja (Mumtaj), a gangster-turned-politician is seen beating up a cop for not falling on her feet. Eventually, she murders him and mocks his dead body for falling on her feet after death. During a college function, Lakshmi and Shailaja get into an altercation. Shailaja takes Lakshmi and humiliates her. Raja comes to Lakshmi's rescue by beating up the goons and humiliating Shailaja by forcing her goons to pose for a few pictures with her in inappropriate positions just like Shailaja did to Lakshmi.

Raja then gets into a local jallikattu competition, which he eventually wins. The organizer, a local village chief, announces that Raja will wed his daughter. He pulls Krishnamoorthy along in this mess. At the wedding, Raja is desperate to escape but unable to do so. Thangapazham enters and stops the wedding by throwing a hand grenade into the crowd, causing people to run. After this, Lakshmi gets sick and is admitted into the hospital run by Raja's brother. However, in Raja's absence, the greedy brother demands money and gets into a fight with Paatti. When she slaps him before his staff and patients, he brutally murders Lakshmi out of rage and sends goons to eliminate Paatti, the only eyewitness. But she reveals to Raja the fact that his brothers are all criminals and then dies. It is revealed that all three brothers are corrupt accomplices of Shailaja.

After learning this, Raja swears an oath to teach his three brothers a good lesson by betraying them while acting to be on their side. While spying on his brothers, he meets with Nikhita (Snigdha Akolkar), a girl who admires Raja for his character. It is revealed that she is the sister of the dreaded Shailaja. The lawyer brother, with the help of a local school's principal, sedates and tries to abuse a student. Raja, wearing a helmet, enters and beats the brother vigorously, saving the girl. His brother cannot see the assaulter's face. Enters nurse Namitha (Kamna Jethmalani), a modern woman ogled by many men in the hospital. Raja eventually ends up befriending her when he tries to perform a stint against his brother to collect evidence.

Raja then witnesses his 2nd brother Esakki brutally stir up a riot and intentionally kill an innocent civilian using a sledgehammer, brutally smashing the civilian's skull. At night, when Esakki pairs up with a high-class prostitute (Babilona) in his police vehicle, Raja ties the vehicle and traps them inside using a crane. Esakki gets caught red-handed the next morning and is suspended from office. The three brothers initially suspect Raja, but he manipulates them into believing that he is innocent.

The 3rd brother, Paal, is a pervert who keeps cameras inside the nurses' dressing room to watch them on his laptop. When Paal leaves the room for operation, Raja breaks the camera and steals Paal's laptop for evidence. Finally, he beats Paal viciously. Later knowing about her sister's love for Raja, Shailaja orders her goons to beat up Raja. He beats them. He then asks Nikhita to slap her sister Shailaja with her sandals to confirm her love for him, which she happily does.

During an award ceremony, Raja blackmails Paal with the previous pieces of evidence he gathered, forcing the latter to announce in front of the crowd that he will perform 100 free heart surgeries. Shailaja later enters the brothers' home for a meet. Fearing recognition, Raja masks his face with shaving cream and mimics a subtle voice. Failing to recognize him, she has a quick conversation with Raja and leaves.

During a visit to a temple function, Shailaja's caravan is abducted and taken control by Raja and Krishnamoorthy. He then forces Shailaja to wear skimpy clothes by blackmailing her using evidence of her murdering a temple official. She agrees out of fear. On seeing her in such skimpy clothes on a temple occasion, people get angry and start riots, thus making her eventually lose her minister position. Angered, she returns to her old gangster form and plots to kill Raja once and for all. She learns that he is the brother of her accomplices through a news clip. The brothers fake their deaths to lure Raja, who is then left for dead after being severely injured by his brothers and Shailaja. However, he was then saved by Krishnamoorthy and Nikhita. He stops the bad guys and Shailaja and eventually kills them. Finally, it is shown that after being released from jail, Raja married Nikhita with Thangapazham's help.

== Cast ==
- Raghava Lawrence as Rajapandian
- Mumtaj as home minister/chief minister Saithai Sailaja
- Snigdha Akolkar as Nikhita
- Kamna Jethmalani as Namitha
- Meenakshi as Thangapazham
- Karunas as Krishnamoorthy
- Premsai as Dr. Paulpandian
- Bose Venkat as Assistant Commissioner Esakki Pandian
- Yugendran as Advocate
- Neelima Rani as Lakshmi, Raja's sister
- Paravai Muniyamma as Raja's grandmother
- Chaams as Doctor
- Santhana Bharathi
- Singamuthu
- Mayilsamy as Hospital Patient
- Chetan as Sub inspector Shakthivel
- Bonda Mani
- Kiran Rathod in an item number

== Production ==
After Sandai (2008), Sakthi Chidambaram announced his next project called Rajathi Raja, the title derived from the 1989 film of the same name. Filming was completed within two months.

== Soundtrack ==
Karunas made his debut as music composer in this film. Paul Jacob was another composer. The lyrics for all songs were written by director Perarasu. The audio was released on 11 May 2009.

- "Kandha Kadambha Kathiresa" - Sam P. Keerthan
- "Elanthapazham (Remix)" - Shakthisree Gopalan, Dinesh
- "Yaaro Oruthi" - Madhu Balakrishnan, Deepa
- "Kathirikaa" - Karunas, Grace
- "Aandipatti Arasampatti" - T. Rajender, Pop Shalini

== Critical reception ==
Pavithra Srinivasan of Rediff.com wrote, "For sheer, mind-numbing crudity, there's no equal to Rajadhi Raja". Sify wrote, "Sakthi Chidambaram’s Rajadhi Raja is the crudest masala movie seen in recent times".

== Controversies ==
After the release, Chidambaram lashed out at Suhasini Maniratnam for giving the film a negative review on her show Hasini Pesum Padam.
