= Maryan (soundtrack) =

Soundtrack album by A. R. Rahman
- Released: 17 May 2013
- Recorded: May 2012 – April 2013
- Studios: Panchathan Record Inn and AM Studios, Chennai; Panchathan Hollywood Studios, Los Angeles; The DrumRoom, Pretoria, South Africa
- Genre: Feature film soundtrack
- Length: 29:53
- Languages: Tamil, Afrikaans, English
- Label: Sony Music India
- Producer: A. R. Rahman

A. R. Rahman chronology
Kadal (2012)	Maryan (2013)	Raanjhanaa (2013)

Singles from Maryan
- 1. "Nenjae Ezhu" Released: 3 May 2013

Maryan is the soundtrack album composed by A. R. Rahman for the 2013 Tamil film of the same name directed by Bharatbala. The film that is produced under the banner Aascar Films, stars Dhanush and Parvathy in the lead roles. The album was released under the label Sony Music India on 17 May 2013. The music received extremely positive critical reception and overwhelming audience response after its release. It also topped the iTunes India charts for the month of May and June 2013. Further, for the remaining months of 2013, it maintained its position in the top 10 music album charts. The soundtrack album was adjudged as "Tamil Album of Year" in iTunes’ Best of 2013. Rahman won the Norway Tamil Film Festival Best Music Director award and the SIIMA Award for Best Music Director in 2014. The soundtrack was nominated at the 2014 Edison Awards and Vijay Awards for both best music direction and best background score. Rahman was also nominated for Filmfare Award for Best Music Director – Tamil but he won the same award for his compositions to Kadal.

== Development ==
By early May 2012, composer A. R. Rahman had finished composing two songs which were filmed in Africa. Poet Kutti Revathi collaborated two and a half years ago with the film director for the song "Nenje Ezhu". She said, "Both of them (Bharat Bala & A. R. Rahman) were very clear that it should be a meaningful song. If the song needed two verses, I wrote eight, and Rahman was able to pick the lines that would work. Neither of them wanted words that we have all already heard." She added that the composer aims positive message to young viewers. The song reflects love, separation, struggle, survival and finally, arising. For both the songs, "Innum Konjam Neram" and "Naetru Aval" the composer and the respective song lyricists maintained simple and flowing poetry. On composing for "Naetru Aval", Rahman stated that he revisited the retro zones to add a ghazal feel to the contemporary music based track. The track "Kadal Raasa Naan" was initially sung by A. R. Rahman but he felt his voice did not suit the track. He insisted on re-recording it with a singer who could impart more emotions with an earthy voice to the song and eventually opted for Yuvan Shankar Raja. Attributed as a rustic yet character-driven number, the final version was recorded in Chennai on 25 April 2013. In July 2013, when singer Velmurugan sang the same track live at an event, the reports of end January 2013 published by Times of India counter-confirmed that he was the first choice for "Kadal Raasa Naan". To bring the feel for the song "Enga Pona Raasaa", the film director wanted singer Shakthisree to visualize herself "walking barefoot on the sand" and so the picturisation of filmed character "Panimalar" (played by Parvathi). Rahman patch recorded the song on guitars played by Keba Jeremiah in the range A_{4} minor. On the first day, the song was recorded in one rhythm. Later, a fundamental part of it was altered. Selectively, portion of words from 'Kaalam enakkul uraiyuthu' until 'Enakenna kedithu' that added continuity to the melancholic track were penned instantaneously after listening to the requisite aalaap sung by Rahman himself. The recorded version though has orchestral violins apart from guitars in its music.

For the background score of the film, vocals of several cast members from Africa were recorded. The opening credits theme song was sung by Bruno Conn in Afrikaans. The song "Sangamam Anbin Sangamam" sung by Chennai based El Fé Choir was headed by Maria Roe Vincent. Actress Parvathy sang an alternate version of the song "Enga Pona Raasaa". All the three tracks were used only in the film score. Her name featured under the singer's list in the opening credits of film.

== Reception ==
=== Critical reception ===
The soundtrack received positive reviews from critics. The critical review board at Behindwoods gave the album 3.5 out of 5 and stated "Maryan's music serves to prove that when ARR is given a free hand to do as he pleases, he weaves magic! Three instant hits and two slow poisons." Music Aloud noted "Definitely not on par with A R Rahman's previous soundtrack that had similar settings, but at least a couple of songs are here to stay." They gave the soundtrack 8 out of 10. Indiaglitz assigned the album 4.2 out of 5 and stated, "Start to finish, the album is purely magical and would make for one of the most cherished repertoires. Coming from none less than the genius, the album sparks further curiosity and interest in the movie. In all, anyone would fall in love with 'Mariyaan'." S. R. Ashok Kumar of The Hindu highlighted that "A.R.Rahman once again mesmerises with his compositions." At The Indian Express, Sankhayan Ghosh & Suanshu Khurana pointed, "Maryan is bit of a mixed bag, with few songs showing signs of new musical signature and some suffering from over familiarity from the composer's previous own songs." They rated the album 3 out of 5. Srikrishna at Musicperk gave 8 out of 10 to the album and his verdict, "While, Kadal had class written all over it, Maryan is much more accessible and eclectic. It also marks Rahman’s return to pure Tamil folk. A memorable album overall." Critic Srinivas Ramanujam of The Times of India set a score of 4 out of 5 stating, "Maryan does have a slight Kadal hangover, in terms of music, but Rahman hits the right note, literally, throughout the album."

=== Chart performance ===
The soundtrack album made its debut at number one upon release on the iTunes India charts. The day after release, the track "Nenjae Ezhu" topped all the charts with over one crore online listeners. As of 8 June 2013 the song "Kadal Raasa Naan" had topped all the Radio FM charts in southern India. After one month of the release of the soundtrack album, the songs "Nenjae Ezhu" and "Kadal Raasa Naan" attained the peak position on the Radio Mirchi South Top 20 charts, whereas "Sonapareeya" peaked at #3 and "Innum Konjam Neram" at #18.

=== Marketing ===
On 31 March 2013, a 40-second teaser with a musical score of "Sonapareeya" was released which showed Dhanush with a spear in his hand, diving into deep sea in a breath and hunting on the seabed. The teaser of the song "Nenje Ezhu" was released on 26 April 2013. It crossed over three lakh views on YouTube in less than two days. A. R. Rahman extended an invitation through YouTube for the premiere of the song "Nenjae Ezhu" on 3 May 2013. The track was released as a single on 3 May 2013.

== Tamil (Original) ==
The complete track listing was revealed on A.R. Rahman's official website on 4 May 2013. The complete soundtrack album was released at the composer's recording studio in Chennai on 17 May 2013, and was also made available as mastered for iTunes version.

Maryan (Original Motion Picture Soundtrack)
No.	Title	Lyrics	Singer(s)	Length
1.	"Nenjae Yezhu"	Kabilan, Kutti Revathi, A. R. Rahman	A. R. Rahman	4:43
2.	"Innum Konjam Naeram"	Kabilan, A. R. Rahman	Vijay Prakash, Swetha Mohan	5:13
3.	"Naetru Aval Irundhal"	Vaalee	Vijay Prakash, Chinmayi Sripaada	4:58
4.	"Sonapareeya"	Vaalee, Sofia Ashraf	Javed Ali, Haricharan, Nakash Aziz, Sofia Ashraf	4:05
5.	"Yenga Pona Raasaa"	Kutti Revathi, A. R. Rahman	Shakthisree Gopalan	3:44
6.	"I Love My Africa"	Brian Kabwe, Blaaze	A. R. Rahman, Blaaze, Madras Youth Choir	2:53
7.	"Kadal Raasa Naan"	Vaalee, Dhanush	Yuvan Shankar Raja, A. R. Rahman	4:13

== Telugu (Dubbed) ==
Telugu Version – Mariyaan
No.	Telugu Song Title	Telugu Lyricist	Singer(s)	Length
1	Manasaa Padhaa	Chandrabose	A. R. Rahman	4:43
2	Inka Koncham Saeppu	Chandrabose	Vijay Prakash, Sunitha Upadrashta	5:17
3	Ninna Thanuvundhi	Chandrabose	Vijay Prakash, Shashaa Tirupati	5:00
4	Sonapareeya	Vennelakanti	Haricharan, D. Sathyaprakash, Nakash Aziz, Sunitha Upadrashta	4:08
5	Emaiyyaavu Rajaa	Vennelakanti	Shakthisree Gopalan	3:46
6	I Love Africa	Various	A. R. Rahman, Blaaze	2:54
7	Kumme Soolam	Vennelakanti	Syed Subahan	4:11

== Accolades ==
- Won, Norway Tamil Film Festival Award for Best Music Director
- Won, SIIMA Award for Best Music Director
- Won, iTunes Music Award for Best Tamil Album
- Won, Mirchi Music Awards South – Album of the Year
- Nominated, Filmfare Award for Best Music Director – Tamil
- Nominated, Edison Award for Best Music Director
- Nominated, Edison Award for Best Background Score
- Nominated, Vijay Award for Best Music Director
- Nominated, Vijay Award for Best Background Score

== Album credits ==
Backing Vocals

A. R. Reihana, Abhay Jodhpurkar, Pooja Vaidyanath, Dr. Narayanan, Senthildass, Malavika Sundar, Santhosh Hariharan, Deepak Subramaniam, Nakash Aziz.

Kids chorus as "Madras Youth Choir" — A. R. Ameen, Sai, R. Ameena, K. Haripriya, K. Saivenkat, S. Akilesh, Dhiyaram, Manavaram, Pranav, Deepika

Personnel

- Drums on "Nenje Ezhu": Vinnie Henrico | Assistant Engineer: Murray Lubbe
- Ghatam: Uma Shankar
- Nadaswaram: M. K. Natraj, Thirumurthy
- Violin: Kalyan, Prabhakaran
- Flute: Kiran
- Guitars: Keba Jeremiah
- Percussions: T.Raja, M.Lakshmi Narayanan, Raju

Production

- Producer: A. R. Rahman
- Mastering: Louie Teran at Marcussen Mastering Studios, Los Angeles | R. Nitish Kumar for the song "Kadal Raasa Naan"
- Engineers:
  - Suresh Permal, Hentry Kuruvilla, T. R. Krishna Chetan, Srinidhi Venkatesh, Jerry Vincent, R. Nitish Kumar, Santhosh Dhayanidhi(at Panchathan Record Inn)
  - S. Sivakumar, Kannan Ganpat, Pradeep, Karthik Sekaran, Anandha Krishnan (at A.M. Studios)
  - Kevin Doucette, Satoshi Mark Naguchi (at Panchathan Hollywood Studios)
- String engineer: V.J. Srinivasamurthy
- Mixing: T.R. Krishna Chetan
- Additional Mixing: Satoshi Mark Naguchi
- Music co-ordinator: Noell James, Priya Chinnaswamy, Vijay Mohan Iyer
- Musicians' fixer: R. Samidurai
