= Photon Kathaas =

Indian film production company

- Type: Film production
- Traded as: PKP.L
- Industry: Motion picture
- Headquarters: Chennai, India
- Key people: Gautham Vasudev Menon; Venky Somasundaram; Reshma Ghatala
- Website: http://www.photonkathaas.com

Photon Kathaas was an Indian film production company led by director Gautham Vasudev Menon. It was established in 2010 by Menon along with Venky Somasundaram and Reshma Ghatala, who worked as the co-promoters. Its name is derived from Gautham Menon's original company Photon Factory, which had previously co-produced several of Menon's films like Vettaiyaadu Vilaiyaadu and Kaakha Kaakha, its Telugu remake Gharshana and Pachaikili Muthucharam.

== History ==
Photon Kathaas's first venture was Menon's psychological thriller Nadunisi Naaygal, Veppam, and Ram's second directorial Thanga Meengal, co-produced with RS Infotainment. Furthermore, an audio label named Photon Kathaas Music was launched as a division of the company, with newcomer Vijay Ebenezer's Kanden becoming their first release.

Soon after Photon Kathaas teamed up with RS Infotainment to produce Neethaane En Ponvasantham (2012), a romantic drama film featuring Jiiva and Samantha, but the film fared averagely at the box office. In February 2013, Elred Kumar of RS Infotainment filed a legal case against Gautham Menon and Madan claiming that he had entered into an agreement to do a film starring Silambarasan with music by A. R. Rahman in November 2008, during the making of Vinnaithaandi Varuvaayaa. He noted that they had agreed again in February 2010 to make the film, but now with Allu Arjun in the lead role. However, Elred claimed that both Gautham and Madan had gone on to do other projects even though they had been paid an advance of 40 million. As a result of the litigation, Menon had trouble releasing the rest of Photon Kathaas' productions.

Despite being announced as Photon Kathaas' productions at launch, Premsai's delayed bilingual films, Courier Boy Kalyan (2015) in Telugu and Tamilselvanum Thaniyar Anjalum (2016) in Tamil, were eventually released as films productions by Gautham Menon and his team without a banner. In an interview in November 2016, Gautham Menon revealed that Photon Kathaas had closed. He added there "was a vision, but we faltered because of the films that we did", and made reference to the cases filed by RS Infotainment against the studio.

== Filmography ==
=== Production ===
Year	Film	Director	Cast	Notes
2011	Nadunisi Naaygal	Gautham Vasudev Menon	Veera, Sameera Reddy	
2011	Veppam	Anjana Ali Khan	Nani, Nithya Menon, Karthik Kumar, Bindu Madhavi	
2012	Ekk Deewana Tha	Gautham Menon	Prateik Babbar, Amy Jackson	
2012	Neethane En Ponvasantham	Gautham Menon	Jiiva, Samantha	
2012	Yeto Vellipoyindhi Manasu	Gautham Menon	Nani, Samantha	
2013	Thanga Meenkal	Ram	Ram, Shelly Kishore, Sadhana	

=== Discography ===
Year	Film	Music director	Director	Cast	Notes
2011	Kandaen	Vijay Ebenezer	A. C. Mugil	Shanthnoo Bhagyaraj, Rashmi Gautam	
2011	Veppam	Joshua Sridhar	Anjana Ali Khan	Nani, Karthik Kumar, Nithya Menon, Bindu Madhavi	

=== Distribution ===
Year	Film	Director	Cast	Notes
2011	The Adventures of Tintin: The Secret of the Unicorn	Steven Spielberg	Jamie Bell, Andy Serkis	Only in Tamil Nadu
