= Avishek Karthik =

Indian film actor

Udhay Avishek Karthik
- Born: Chennai, Tamil Nadu, India
- Other names: Karthik, Deva
- Occupation: Actor
- Years active: 2007 – present
- Relatives: Maheshwari (Sister); Sri Devi (Aunt)

Udhay Avishek Karthik is an Indian actor who has appeared in Tamil language films. Closely associated with director Gautham Vasudev Menon, Karthik has worked previously as Menon's assistant in the films Pachaikili Muthucharam (2007) and Vaaranam Aayiram (2008), before making a breakthrough as an actor through the director's experimental thriller Nadunisi Naaygal (2011).

== Early life ==
Karthik was born to Mohan Reddy, who hails from Tirupati, and Suryakala Yalamanchili, who belongs to Telugu speaking community in Sivakasi, Tamil Nadu. He is the brother of actress Maheswari and the nephew of veteran actress Sridevi.

== Career ==
Karthik joined Gautham Menon's directorial team in 2006 and worked with him during the production of Pachaikili Muthucharam (2007), before being announced as one of the four new male leads in a film titled Chennaiyil Oru Mazhaikaalam to be directed by Menon. The film, set in the backdrop of Chennai's IT industry, began its shoot in mid-2007 with Trisha leading an ensemble cast but was later delayed and then eventually shelved.

Karthik then continued his work with Menon as an assistant director, and featured in the supporting role of Mahesh, Suriya's friend in Vaaranam Aayiram (2008). He subsequently opted against continuing in Menon's team for Vinnaithaandi Varuvaayaa (2010), but was approached to act in the director's experimental film Nadunisi Naaygal (2011) alongside Veera and Sameera Reddy. Credited in the film as Deva, he worked out and built his body to portray a cop convincingly. The film opened to mixed reviews, with a critic from Rediff.com noting "Deva, as the serious Assistant Commissioner of Police, does a neat job", while Behindwoods.com wrote "Deva who plays a cop has nothing much to do but he does it well". The film was later also dubbed and released in Telugu, with Karthik's link to actress Sridevi garnering the film further attention from the media.

In mid-2014, he began work on Kaathadi, which eventually had a delayed release in February 2018.

== Filmography ==
Year	Film	Role	Notes
2007	Pachaikili Muthucharam	Singer	Cameo appearance in "Kadhal Konjam" song
2008	Vaaranam Aayiram	Mahesh	credited as Karthik
2011	Nadunisi Naaygal	Vijay	
2018	Kaathadi	Sakthi	
2023	Dinosaurs	Mannu	
2024	Family Padam	Tamizh	
