= Vijay Award for Best Debut Actor =

Award category

The Vijay Award for Best Début Actor is presented by STAR Vijay as part of the annual Vijay Awards ceremony, recognizing achievements in Tamil (Kollywood) films.

== The list ==
The following is a list of award winners and the films for which they won.

Year	Actor	Film	Link
2017	Vasanth Ravi	Taramani	
2014	Dulquer Salmaan	Vaayai Moodi Pesavum	
2013	Gautham Karthik	Kadal	
2012	Vikram Prabhu	Kumki	
2011	Nani	Veppam	
2010	Vidharth	Mynaa	
2009	Vimal	Pasanga	
2008	Shanthnoo Bhagyaraj	Sakkarakatti	
2007	Karthi	Paruthiveeran	
2006			

== Nominations ==
- 2007 Karthi – Paruthiveeran
  - Aadhi – Mirugam
  - Akhil – Kalloori
  - Shiva – Chennai 600028
  - Vinay Rai – Unnale Unnale
- 2008 Shanthnoo Bhagyaraj – Sakkarakatti
  - Ajmal Ameer – Anjathey
  - Krishna Sekhar – Alibhabha
  - Sasikumar – Subramaniyapuram
- 2009 Vimal – Pasanga
  - Johnny – Renigunta
  - Ramakrishnan – Kunguma Poovum Konjum Puravum
  - Tharun Gopi – Mayandi Kudumbathar
  - Vishnu Vishal – Vennila Kabadi Kuzhu
- 2010 Vidharth – Mynaa
  - Atharvaa – Baana Kaathadi
  - Arulnidhi – Vamsam
  - Mahesh – Angaadi Theru
  - Myshkin – Nandhalala
- 2011 Nani – Veppam
  - Krishna – Seedan
  - Jeyanth – Margazhi 16
  - Shabarish – Markandeyan
  - Veera Bahu – Nadunisi Naaygal
- 2012 Vikram Prabhu – Kumki
  - Sivakarthikeyan – Marina
  - Dinesh – Attakathi
  - Udhayanidhi Stalin – Oru Kal Oru Kannadi
  - Sri – Vazhakku Enn 18/9
- 2013 Gautham Karthik – Kadal
  - Ashok Selvan – Pizza II: Villa
  - Sundeep Kishan – Yaaruda Mahesh
  - Nivin Pauly – Neram
  - Sathya – Puthagam
- 2014 Dulquer Salmaan – Vaayai Moodi Pesavum
  - Chandran – Kayal
  - Naga – Pisaasu
  - Abhinay Vaddi – Ramanujan
  - Santhosh Prathap – Kathai Thiraikathai Vasanam Iyakkam

== See also ==
- Tamil cinema
- Cinema of India
