= Kumaara Sambavam =

2025 Tamil film by Balaji Venugopal

- Theatrical release poster
- Directed by: Balaji Venugopal
- Written by: Balaji Venugopal
- Produced by: KJ Ganesh; KR Raja
- Starring: Kumaran Thangarajan; Payal Radhakrishna; Kumaravel; Bala Saravanan
- Cinematography: Jagadeesh
- Edited by: Madhan
- Music by: Achu Rajamani
- Production companies: Six Star Entertainment; Venus Infotainment
- Release date: 12 September 2025
- Country: India
- Language: Tamil

Kumaara Sambavam is a 2025 Indian Tamil-language comedy drama film written and directed by Balaji Venugopal. The film stars Kumaran Thangarajan in the titular role in his debut as lead actor alongside Payal Radhakrishna, Kumaravel, Bala Saravanan, G. M. Kumar, Vinod Sagar, Livingston.

Kumaara Sambavam released in theatres on 12 September 2025 and received positive reviews from critics.

== Cast ==
- Kumaran Thangarajan as Kumaran
- Payal Radhakrishna
- Kumaravel as Varadharajan
- Bala Saravanan
- G. M. Kumar as Kumaran's grandfather
- Vinod Sagar
- Livingston
- Vinoth Munna
- Shiva Aravind
- Gowtham Sundararajan
- Arjai
- Charles Vinoth
- Vijay Jasper
- Saravanan
- K. Gopal
- Telephone Raj
- Sakthi Balaji Krishnaraj
- V. Tharani
- Kavitha
- Shravan Ramakrishnan
- Yaashvan Ramesh

== Production ==
Actor-turned-director Balaji Venugopal announced to join hands with Kumaran Thangarajan, for the former's sophomore directorial after Lucky Man (2023). The film marks Thangarajan's debut as lead actor alongside an ensemble cast consisting of Kumaravel, Bala Saravanan, G. M. Kumar, Vinod Sagar, Livingston and others. The film was produced by KJ Ganesh and KJ Raja under Six Star Productions and Venus Infotainment banners.

== Music ==
Kumaara Sambavam

Soundtrack album by Achu Rajamani
- Genre: Feature film soundtrack
- Language: Tamil
- Label: Saregama
- Producer: Achu Rajamani

Singles from Kumaara Sambavam
- 1. "Vidiyatha Iravondru" Released: 20 August 2025; 2. "Idhu Devadhai Nerame" Released: 29 August 2025

The film score was composed by Achu Rajamani. The first single "Vidiyatha Iravondru" was released on 20 August 2025. The second single "Idhu Devadhai Nerame" was released on 29 August 2025.

Track listing
| No. | Title | Lyrics | Singer(s) | Length |
|---|---|---|---|---|
| 1. | "Vidiyatha Iravondru" | Balaji Venugopal | Achu Rajamani |
| 2. | "Idhu Devadhai Nerame" | Balaji Venugopal | Haricharan Sheshadri, Saindhavi |

== Release ==
Kumaara Sambavam released in theatres on 12 September 2025.

== Reception ==
=== Critical response ===
Kumaara Sambavam received positive reviews from critics.

Abhinav Subramanian of The Times of India gave 3.5/5 stars and wrote "The mystery is more a corridor than a maze, and a couple of reveals land soft, but the film never promises a dark thriller anyway. Also, we've seen this 'filmmaker inside a film' idea many times. It is not novel, it is nicely made, and that is enough." Avinash Ramachandran of Cinema Express gave 3/5 stars and wrote "Even as the comedy shines bright, Kumaara Sambavam manages to bring in the right amount of preachiness. The messaging here is not going against the grain of the film, but it is neatly ingrained in the narrative." Cinema Vikatan positively reviewed the film, praising its performances, screenplay and the plot twists.
