= Family Padam =

2024 Tamil film by Selvah Kumar Thirumaaran

- Directed by: Selvah Kumar Thirumaaran
- Written by: Selvah Kumar Thirumaaran
- Produced by: K. Balaji
- Starring: Udhay Karthik; Vivek Prasanna; Subhiksha Kayarohanam
- Cinematography: Meyyendiran
- Edited by: Sudharsan
- Music by: Original Songs: Anivee; Background Score: Ajesh
- Production company: UK Creations
- Distributed by: Tentkotta
- Release date: 6 December 2024
- Country: India
- Language: Tamil

Family Padam (transl. Family film) is a 2024 Indian Tamil-language comedy drama film written and directed by Selvah Kumar Thirumaaran and produced by K. Balaji under his UK Creations banner. The film stars Udhay Karthik in the lead role, alongside Vivek Prasanna, Subhiksha Kayarohanam, Parthiban Kumar, Sreeja Ravi, Mohana Sundharam, Kavin and Janani in supporting roles.

Family Padam released in theatres on 6 December 2024.

== Premise ==
The story revolves around three brothers with a common goal, who have failed in their professional lives and have to face the family situational hurdles.

== Cast ==
- Udhay Karthik as Tamizh
- Vivek Prasanna as Sarath Kumar
- Subhiksha Kayarohanam as Yamuna
- Parthiban Kumar as Parthi
- Sreeja Ravi
- Indrans
- Mohana Sundharam
- Kavin Gt
- Janani Samathanam
- RJ Priyanka

== Production ==
In late-March 2024, it was announced that actor Udhay Karthik who was last seen in Dinosaurs (2023) will be featuring in his next film titled Family Padam helmed by debutant director Selvah Kumar Thirumaaran, who had earlier worked as a writer for Rudhran (2023). The film is produced by K Balaji of UK Creations. The technical crew consists of cinematographer Meyyendiran, editor Sudharsan, music composed by Anivee and background scored by Ajesh. Principal photography began after a formal puja ceremony on 23 March 2024 and was wrapped in late-May 2024.

== Music ==
Family Padam

Soundtrack album by Anivee
- Genre: Feature film soundtrack
- Language: Tamil
- Label: Divo Music
- Producer: Anivee

The soundtrack is composed by Anivee and background is scored by Ajesh. The first single "Salary Song" was released on 6 November 2024. The second single "Nesama" was released on 14 November 2024.

Track listing
No.	Title	Lyrics	Singer(s)	Length
1.	"Salary Song"	Ahamed Shyam, Anivee	Anivee
2.	"Nesama"	Ahamed Shyam	Anand Aravindakshan, Svara Suresh

== Release ==
=== Theatrical ===
Family Padam released in theatres on 6 December 2024.

== Reception ==
=== Critical response ===
Avinash Ramachandran of The Indian Express rated three out of five and wrote, "Family Padam is quite a meta film on so many levels, and has the shades of other such Tamil films of this genre, including Jigarthanda, and Uppu Karuvaadu. However, the movie decides to take the seemingly simpler route of family entertainer, which is actually quite tough to crack."

Akshay Kumar of Cinema Express rated three out of five and wrote, "Family Padam is a delightful return to a 90s family entertainer that remains engaging throughout and offers comfort in the familiar, despite being downright predictable." Abhinav Subramanian of The Times of India rated two point five out of five and wrote, "Director Selvah Kumar Thirumaaran has set up every family moment with emotional extremes. Characters don’t just talk - they explode, whether in joy, rage, or despair."
