= Rajathandhiram =

2015 Indian film by AG Amid

- Theatrical release poster
- Rajathanthiram
- Directed by: AG Amid
- Written by: AG Amid
- Produced by: Sunland Cinemas, White Bucket
- Starring: Veera; Regina Cassandra; Pattiyal K. Shekar
- Cinematography: S. R. Kathir
- Edited by: Praveen Antony
- Music by: Original songs: G. V. Prakash Kumar; Background Score: Sandeep Chowta
- Production companies: Sunland Cinemas; White Bucket Productions
- Distributed by: Fox Star Studios
- Release date: 13 March 2015
- Running time: 135 minutes
- Country: India
- Language: Tamil

Rajathandhiram (transl. Strategic diplomacy) is a 2015 Indian Tamil-language heist thriller film written and directed by debutant A. G. Amid and jointly produced by Sunland Cinemas and White Bucket Productions. Fox Star Studios acquired the distribution rights to the film. The film stars Veera and Regina Cassandra. Sandeep Chowta composed the film score, G. V. Prakash Kumar composed a promo song, cinematography was handled by S. R. Kathir. The film was edited by Praveen Antony, the production designed by Videsh and action sequences were designed and choreographed by Stunt Silva.

The film was released on 13 March 2015. On 13 March 2016, the team announced the launch of its sequel, Rajathandhiram 2, with a six-minute video clip on YouTube. The film was remade in Kannada as Panta (2017).

== Plot ==
Three jobless youths find their livelihood in small-time crime. After much deliberation, they decide to attempt a bigger theft which goes haywire and creepy baddies are after them. They also find themselves entrapped by two shady characters who want them to pull off a much bigger heist with a potential pay of 200 million rupees.

== Cast ==
- Veera as Arjun Parthiban
- Regina Cassandra as Michelle D'Mello (Voice dubbed by Savitha Reddy)
- Pattiyal K. Shekar as Azhagappan Chettiar
- Darbuka Siva as Deepan alias Austin D'Costa
- Ajai Prasath as Devaraaj Sarathy
- Ilavarasu as Sethu Madhavan Iyer
- Aadukalam Naren as Dharmaraj Masani
- Aroul D. Shankar

== Production ==
The film was reported in June 2013 when it was revealed that Veera, who had appeared in Nadunisi Naaygal (2011), was making a comeback in a venture produced by White Bucket Productions. The project, titled Rajathandhiram, was to be directed by A. G. Amid, while G. V. Prakash Kumar would score the film's music. Reports suggested that Manasi Rachh, who had appeared in Karan Johar's Hindi film Student of the Year (2012), would play the leading female role while Aadukalam Naren and Srihari would also form a part of the cast.

Rajathandhiram

Soundtrack album by G. V. Prakash Kumar
- Released: 2015
- Recorded: 2014
- Genre: Feature film soundtrack
- Length: 3:01
- Language: Tamil
- Label: Think Music
- Producer: G. V. Prakash Kumar

G. V. Prakash Kumar chronology
| Pencil (2015) | Rajathandhiram (2015) | Komban (2015) |

Portions of the film were also filmed at Birla Planetarium, Chennai in February 2014, with the team issuing a press release breaking the silence on the progress of the venture. It was also revealed that Regina Cassandra was a part of the project. It was reported that the film was close to completion in June 2014 and that musician Darbuka Siva had played a pivotal role in the film. Sandeep Chowta replaced Prakash Kumar as the film composer, although the latter contributed a song which was used as a promotional track. The filming was completed in mid 2014.

== Soundtrack ==
The background music for this film was composed by Sandeep Chowta. However, the single song in the movie was composed by G. V. Prakash Kumar.

| S.No | Song | Singers | Lyrics |
|---|---|---|---|
| 1 | Yenn Indha Paarvaigal | G. V. Prakash Kumar, Saindhavi | Madhan Karky |

== Release ==
=== Critical reception ===
Bharadwaj Rangan of The Hindu wrote, "this is a film that assumes that there is an audience out there for smartly packaged entertainment. It is a film made for the love of cinema and not from fear of the box office. It's evocatively shot, has a super-stylish background score and the writing is unafraid to take its time...This sort of filmmaking is its own kind of heist, tunneling into the bowels of Kollywood, to the vault that houses all the cherished staples, and escaping with your dignity intact". The Times of India gave the film 3.5 stars out of 5 and wrote, "Making a heist film is as tricky as pulling a heist for everything depends on timing. With Rajathandhiram, AG Amid has managed to perform the trick very convincingly — the filmmaking is quite nimble and confident that it is hard to believe that this is the work of a debutant director...Rajathandhiram will certainly find a place among the best films of the year".one of the best of its kind. Movies of this kind should be appreciated and welcomed in Tamil cinema. Sify wrote, "Rajathandhiram is a con-caper laced with revenge, wit, humour & romance. What works here is director Amid's smart writing and brilliant screenplay sans all the normal cliches seen in such genre...it's a perfectly satisfying watch". Indiaglitz rated the film 3.5 out of 5 and wrote, "the treatment of Rajathandhiram is a big plus. The performance of the lead roles and the way the protagonist is clashing with the villain is definitely a new chapter in the book of the screenplay". Behindwoods.com rated it 2.75 out of 5 and called it "A smart con movie which entertains".

=== Home media ===
Rajathandhiram was dubbed into Hindi as Ek Ultimate Chaalbaaz (transl. An Ultimate Trickster) in 2019. The digital rights of both the Tamil and Hindi dubbed versions were sold to JioHotstar.
