= Tamilselvanum Thaniyar Anjalum =

2016 film directed by Premsai

- Theatrical release poster
- Directed by: Premsai
- Written by: Premsai
- Produced by: Gautham Vasudev Menon; Reshma Ghatala; Venkat Somasundaram
- Starring: Jai; Santhanam; Yami Gautam
- Cinematography: Sathya Ponmar
- Edited by: Praveen Antony
- Music by: Songs: Karthik; Score: Sandeep Chowta
- Production company: Guru Films
- Release date: 5 August 2016
- Running time: 102 minutes
- Country: India
- Language: Tamil

Tamilselvanum Thaniyar Anjalum (transl. Tamilselvan and Private Mail) is a 2016 Indian Tamil-language action thriller film directed by Premsai and produced by Gautham Vasudev Menon. The film stars Jai, Santhanam and Yami Gautam with Ashutosh Rana, VTV Ganesh, Prem, Nassar, and Thambi Ramaiah in supporting roles. The film, featuring film score and soundtrack composed by Karthik.

Tamilselvanum Thaniyar Anjalum, inspired by the 2012 American film Premium Rush, was simultaneously shot in Telugu as Courier Boy Kalyan. However, the Telugu version was released in September 2015, after financial issues for the film were solved earlier than for the Tamil version. Despite production beginning in 2012, the film was released only on 5 August 2016. It received mixed reviews, and failed at the box office.

== Plot ==
Tamilselvan is a college drop-out, who does all small jobs, but becomes disinterested. Soon, Tamil moves to Chennai and stays at his uncle AC Shakthivel's house to land in a satisfying profession. His friend Nasar, a courier boy, asks him to deliver a packet at a Khadi shop, where he meets Kavya and falls in love with her, where he becomes a courier boy in order to visit Kavya everyday.

Meanwhile, Arun is a high-profile doctor, who forms a team to smuggle stem cells from pregnant women and makes them to take a medicine, which induces abortion. However, a ward boy named Manikandan finds about the smuggling operation when he overhears a conversation between Arun and his colleague. Manikandan couriers all the details to a social activist Sathyamoorthy in Chennai. When Arun learns that the package is to be transported, he kills Manikandan and manages to make it look like an accident, where he also attacks Sathyamoorthy, who survives and orders his henchmen to snatch the courier from the courier boy, who is actually Tamil.

A chase ensues between Tamil and Arun's henchmen where Tamil manages to subdue Arun and kill him in a road accident, after learning about his plan. Tamil provides the courier to Sathyamoorthy where the stem cell scam gets exposed and Arun's partners are arrested. After this, Tamil receives ₹1 billion (equivalent to ₹1.5 billion or US$16 million in 2023) reward for his bravery, where he gives the money to Manikandan's family and moves with Kavya on a date.

== Cast ==
- Jai as Tamilselvan
- Yami Gautam as Kavya
- Santhanam as Nasar
- Ashutosh Rana as Dr. Arun
- Nassar as Sathyamoorthy
- Thambi Ramaiah as Manikandan
- VTV Ganesh as AC Shakthivel
- Prem as Shiva
- Satya Krishnan as Shakthivel's wife
- Thalapathy Dinesh as Venu
- Madhan Bob as Office Manager
- Lollu Sabha Manohar as Kathiresan
- Swaminathan as "Rotten tooth" Sekar
- Pasi Sathya as Mary
- Sampath Ram
- Pondy Ravi
- Lollu Sabha Antony as a beggar
- Lollu Sabha Easter
- Bava Lakshmanan as Watchman
- Uma
- Azhagu
- Gokul
- Magi
- Visweswara Rao
- Sangeetha Balan
- Vinitha
- Julie

== Production ==
In January 2012, it was reported that Gautham Vasudev Menon would be producing a film starring Jai and Abhinaya, and would mark the directorial debut of Premsai, an erstwhile assistant to Prabhu Deva. It was simultaneously shot in Tamil as Tamilselvanum Thaniyar Anjalum, and Telugu as Courier Boy Kalyan with Nithiin instead of Jai. Menon revealed that if the film became a success, potential sequels under the titles of Tamilselvanum Varuvaithuraiyum and Tamilselvanum Podhupanithuraiyum were planned. While the film was initially planned to be in Tamil only, once it was decided to shoot in Telugu as well, Abhinaya was removed from both versions of the project. Instead, Yami Gautam was signed on as her replacement after the makers were impressed with her performance in the Hindi film Vicky Donor. The film, despite beginning production in 2012, languished in production hell due to financial issues. Schedules were also delayed as a result of shooting the film twice in Tamil and then Telugu, with the timetabling of dates of artistes and technicians becoming a problem.

== Soundtrack ==
The soundtrack was composed by Karthik. The audio was released on 8 September 2015.

Track listing
No.	Title	Lyrics	Singer(s)	Length
1.	"Maya O Maya"	Na. Muthukumar	Karthik	4:20
2.	"Venmegangal"	Madhan Karky	Sricharan Kasturirangan, Karthik, Megha	3:58
3.	"Kalakku (I Like It)"	Viveka	Karthik, Deepak, Baba Sehgal	3:14
Total length:				11:32

== Release and reception ==
Tamilselvanum Thaniyar Anjalum was released on 5 August 2016. S. Saraswathi of Rediff.com wrote, "Tamilselvanum Thaniyar Anjalum may not be a gripping thriller, but has an interesting plot, moves along briskly with some fun moments, has a great background score and high octane stunts in the climax". Gautaman Bhaskaran of Hindustan Times rated the film 2 out of 5, saying, "Despite knocking at the burning issues of the day and plotted with disarming novelty, Tamil cinema often allows itself be distracted by bland romances, puerile humour and sappy songs" and this was an example of that.

M. Suganth of The Times of India wrote, "With a premise [...] that could make many directors feel envious for not having thought of it first, Premsai gets the first thing right in Tamilselvanum Thaniyar Anjalum, his directorial debut. But, unfortunately, that is only of the few things he does well in this film, which displays a split personality — it is engrossing one moment and infuriating the next". Anupama Subramanian of Deccan Chronicle wrote, "On paper, the idea might have looked thought provoking, but while transferring it to onscreen he misses out in his narrative".
