= Meghna Reddy =

Indian model and VJ

- Born: 24 October 1975 (age 50); Rajahmundry, Andhra Pradesh, India
- Occupations: Model, television presenter
- Years active: 1990s–present
- Known for: Co-anchoring Channel V's Mangta Hai
- Spouse: Ariel Mionis (m. 12 December 2008)
- Parent(s): Chintapoli Reddy (father), Nakshatra Reddy (mother)
- Relatives: Sushama Reddy (sister), Sameera Reddy (sister)

Meghna Reddy (born 24 October 1975) is an Indian model and former television presenter from Andhra Pradesh. She was known for co-anchoring Channel V's Mangta Hai in the mid 1990s.

== Early life ==
Reddy was born in Rajamahendravaram, Andhra Pradesh but was raised in Bombay (now Mumbai) by her Telugu father, Chintapoli Reddy, a businessman, and a Mangalorean Konkani mother. She lives in New York. Her mother Nakshatra, referred to as Niki by her daughters and the media, was a microbiologist and worked with an NGO. She has two sisters, Sushama Reddy, a former Indian actress is the eldest, and the youngest, Sameera Reddy, is a Bollywood actress and model. On 12 December 2008, Reddy was married in Greece to Ariel Mionis, a Greek businessman, whom she describes as an artist, a published poet, photographer and painter.

== Career ==
Reddy is a former VJ who co-anchored the show Mangta Hai, on Channel V during the mid-nineties. After a VJ career for many years she left for England for better opportunities. She featured in campaigns for mail catalogs such as Macy's, Tommy Hilfiger and Sisley. She made her debut in the New York fashion scene in September 2002, walking the ramp for designer Diane von Furstenberg. She was cast in 2003 Bollywood erotic thriller Boom (film) which she left midway and was replaced by Katrina Kaif. She was also featured on the National Geographic cover in August 1999 with an article in the Global Culture section.
