= Balaji Venugopal =

Actor

- Occupations: Actor, RJ, TV Host, Screenwriter, Director
- Years active: 2005–present

Balaji Venugopal is an Indian actor and director who works in Tamil-language films. Beginning his career as a radio host and television anchor, Balaji appeared in films including Poi Solla Porom, Madrasapattinam (2010) and Nanban (2012), before playing a leading role in the noir comedy Sutta Kadhai (2013).

== Career ==
After beginning his career as a radio jockey in Radio Mirchi, He is currently working as a prime time radiokey in Hello FM. Balaji became a television presenter for Vijay TV hosting a show Vasool Rani, he then went on to host Raagamaalika on Jaya TV. He made his acting debut with Poi Solla Porom (2008) and then appeared in films including Madrasapattinam (2010), Nanban and Kadhalil Sodhappuvadhu Yeppadi (2012), before playing a leading role in the noir comedy Sutta Kadhai (2013). He has played the antagonist role in Naaigal Jaakirathai (2015).

In 2015, Venugopal became the creative head of a new YouTube channel called Madras Meter, which features several comedy skit videos in Tamil and has attracted over 250,000 subscribers. Balaji Venugopal directed a web series for Shortflix titled Paani Poori. He made his directorial feature film debut with Lucky Man (2023) starring Yogi Babu. Got Critically acclaimed for it unique content, was trending in Amazon prime in Top 5 Indian films for more than a month since its release. In 2025 his Next film Kumaarasambavam got released took even more laurels & great reviews from every corner from leading reviewers.

== Filmography ==
=== As actor ===
Year	Title	Role	Notes
2008	Poi Solla Porom	Stage Director	Also dialogue assistant
2010	Madrasapattinam	Veerasekhara Murali	
2012	Nanban	Ragging senior	
2012	Thaandavam	Meenakshi's cousin	
2012	Maalai Pozhudhin Mayakathilaey	Satish	
2012	Kadhalil Sodhappuvadhu Yeppadi	Ramakrishnan	
2013	Settai	Neelakantan	
2013	Sutta Kadhai	Venky	
2013	Endrendrum Punnagai	Balaji	
2014	Aadama Jaichomada	Dhayalan	
2014	Naaigal Jaakirathai	Anbu	
2014	Thottal Thodarum	Gowtham	
2015	Idhu Enna Maayam	Bharath	
2016	Pencil	Arun Kumar	
2016	Iru Mugan	Manish	
2017	Ticket		
2017	Sathya	Vasanth Menon	
2017	Velaikkaran	Saffron Assistant Senior Manager	
2018	Tik Tik Tik	Team head	
2018	Kanaa	Bank Manager	
2021	Lift	Vice President of AMRAK	
2023	Lucky Man	RJ	Also director

=== As director and writer ===
Year	Title	Credited as		Notes
Year	Title	Director	Writer	Notes
2023	Paani Poori	Yes	Yes	Web series on Shortflix
2023	Lucky Man	Yes	Yes	
2023	Boo	No	Dialogues	
2025	Kumaara Sambavam	Yes	Yes	

=== As lyricist ===
Year	Movie	Song(s)	Notes
2023	Lucky Man	"Thottu Thavazhum", "Oru Vari Kadhai", "Edhudhan Inga"	
2024	Lucky Baskhar	"Ushaaru Maapla" "Vidhi Maarudha"	
2026	Vishwanath & Sons	"Paalmazhai" "Uyire Uyire" "Aariraro Aariro"	

=== Television ===
Year	Show	Role	Channel	Notes
2005	Vasool Rani		Star Vijay	
2006-2010	Raagamaalika		Jaya TV	
