= Courier Boy Kalyan =

2015 film directed by Premsai

- Movie poster
- Directed by: Premsai
- Written by: Premsai
- Produced by: Gautham Vasudev Menon; Venkat Somasundaram; Reshma Ghatala; Sunitha Tati
- Starring: Nitin; Yami Gautam
- Cinematography: Satya Ponmar
- Edited by: Prawin Pudi
- Music by: Songs: Karthik Anup Rubens; Score: Sandeep Chowta
- Production company: Photon Kathaas
- Release date: 17 September 2015
- Running time: 100 minutes
- Country: India
- Language: Telugu

Courier Boy Kalyan is a 2015 Indian Telugu-language action thriller film directed by Premsai, who had earlier assisted Prabhu Deva. This film is produced by Gautham Vasudev Menon under the banners Photon Kathaas and Guru films. It is inspired by David Koepp's 2012 Hollywood film Premium Rush. It stars Nitin and Yami Gautam in the lead roles.

The film, featuring film score and soundtrack composed by Karthik, was also simultaneously shot in Tamil as Tamilselvanum Thaniyar Anjalum with Jai in the lead role. The film was released on 17 September 2015. The film was dubbed in Hindi with the same name.

== Plot ==
A corrupt doctor (Ashutosh Rana) sells illegal medicines and smuggles stem cells. He lives in London, but after the police raids his laboratory and he almost becomes a suspect there, he moves to India and continues his business there. Meanwhile, enters Kalyan (Nithin) who has a discontinued degree, is jobless, and is an orphan living with his sister (Surekha Vani) and brother-in-law (Harsha Vardhan). He one day delivers a courier to Kavya (Yami Gautam) for his friend (Satyam Rajesh), and it is love at first sight for him. He decides to get a job as a courier boy so he can deliver more couriers to her, but Kavya only gets couriers yearly, so he secretly delivers fake couriers to her so that he can see her every day. He even tries to woo her, but she does not pay much attention to him and eventually reveals that she is in love with someone (not knowing that it was him all along and that she reciprocates his feelings for her). Meanwhile, the doctor successfully begins his hospitals throughout India and reveals his plan about his illegal medicines and stem cell smuggling. He kills many unborn infants and purposefully makes many women's pregnancy a miscarriage. Kalyan's sister becomes pregnant, and she ends up getting the medicine that causes the miscarriage, but luckily, she never takes it. A man overhears the doctor's plan and sends a courier to Sathya Murthy (Nassar), but it is not delivered to him yet. Kalyan ends up getting the courier. The man who planned to send the courier gets killed by the doctor, as the doctor and his goons start chasing after Kalyan and the courier. The rest of the story is about how Kalyan successfully delivers the courier and proves the doctor guilty.

== Cast ==
- Nithiin as Kalyan
- Yami Gautam as Kavya
- Ashutosh Rana as Corrupt Doctor
- Brahmanandam as Satyanarayana
- Nassar as Sathyamurthy
- Harsha Vardhan as Kalyan's brother-in-law
- Surekha Vani as Kalyan's sister
- Satyam Rajesh as Kalyan's friend
- Saptagiri as Kampoornesh Babu / Kampu
- Telangana Shakuntala as Mary Madam
- Ravi Prakash as Jr. Doctor
- Gundu Sudarshan as Interviewer
- Kadambari Kiran

== Production ==
The singer turned composer Karthik who debuted as the music director in film Aravaan is doing the music for this film. After looking into several options, director Premsai zeroed in on Yami Gautam, who won the role finally.

== Soundtrack ==
Courier Boy Kalyan

Soundtrack album by Karthik Anup Rubens
- Released: 21 August 2015
- Recorded: 2015
- Genre: Soundtrack
- Length: 15:02
- Label: Sony Music India
- Producers: Karthik; Anup Rubens

The music was composed by Karthik with Anup Rubens composing a song. The album was released on Sony Music India.

Track listing
No.	Title	Lyrics	Music	Singer(s)	Length
1.	"Maya O Maya"	Shreshta	Karthik	Karthik	4:20
2.	"Bangaramma"	Ananta Sriram, Sricharan Kasturirangan	Karthik	Sricharan Kasturirangan, Karthik, Megha	3:58
3.	"Mandu Mandu"	Sahithi	Karthik	Karthik, Baba Sehgal	3:14
4.	"Vaalu Kalla Pilla"	Bhaskarabhatla Ravi Kumar	Anup Rubens	Anup Rubens, Suchitra	3:30
Total length:					15:02

=== Release ===
The makers announced the worldwide release date as 11 September 2015. Later, the worldwide release date was postponed to 17 September 2015.
