= Sushama Reddy =

Indian model, VJ, actress and producer

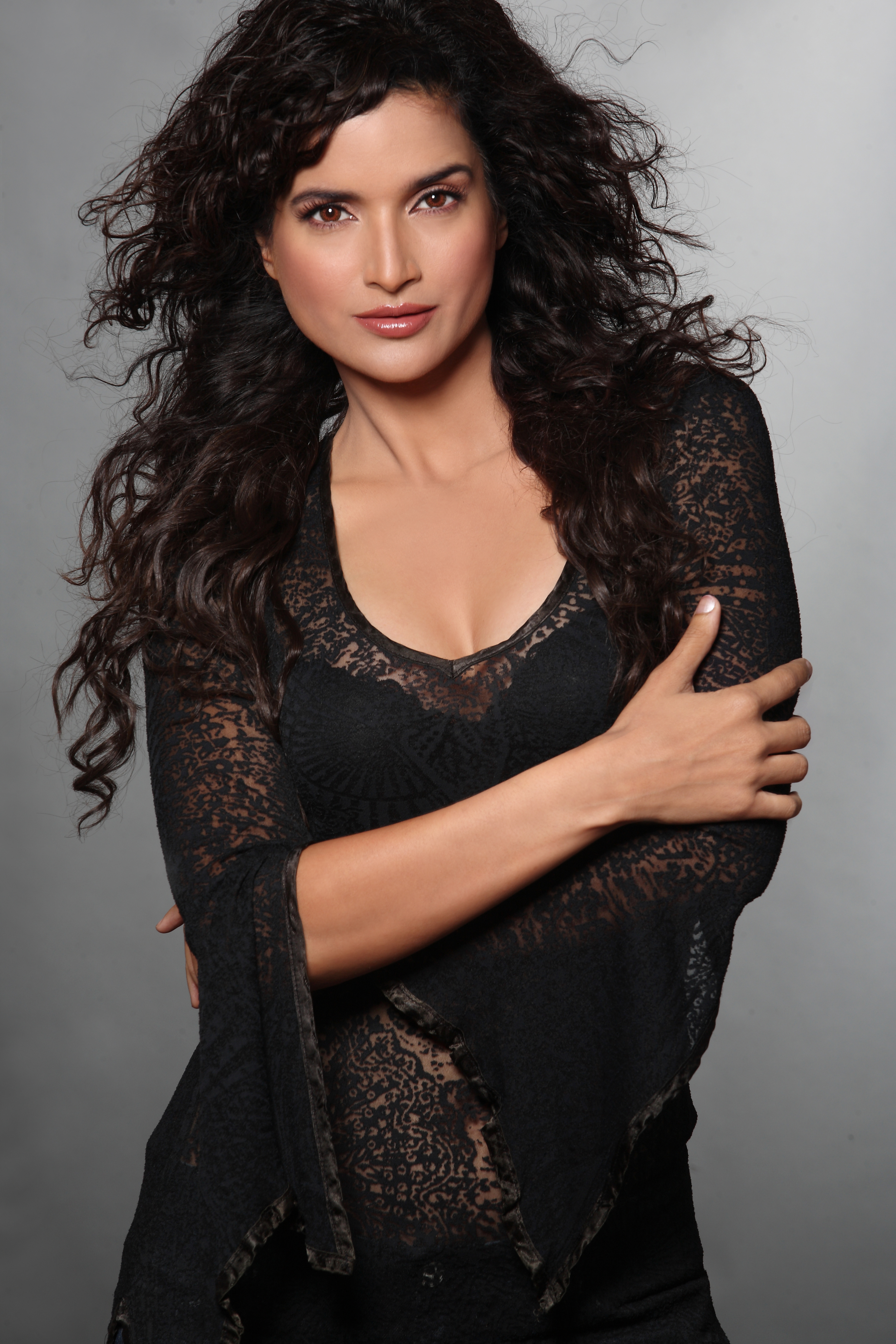
- Sushama Reddy modeling a dress
- Occupations: Model, actress, producer
- Years active: 2005–2010
- Relatives: Meghna Reddy (sister); Sameera Reddy (sister)

Sushama Reddy is an Indian Fashion model, VJ (media personality), actress and producer.

== Early life ==
Sushama Reddy was born in Hyderabad into a Telugu speaking family of Chinta Poli Reddy, a businessman and Chinta Nakshatra Reddy, who was a Microbiologist. She has two younger sisters Meghna Reddy, a former model and Sameera Reddy, a popular Bollywood actress.

== Early career ==
She studied at the Bombay Scottish School, Mahim and graduated in economics from Mithibai College, Mumbai, Maharashtra, India. She completed a filmmaking course from NYFA, New York City in the United States.

== Career ==
=== Modeling ===
Her sister Meghna persuaded her to join the television world. Her first break was given by Bharatbala Productions. She worked on more than 100 television commercials including Limca, Fair & Lovely, Liberty, Godrej, Blender's Pride, Ford Icon and a TV commercial for Thumbs Up with Salman Khan. Reddy also appeared in Sonu Nigam's music video Deewana with Diwakar Pundir, in DJ Suketu's Tere Jaisa Pyaar and Sona Mohapatra's music compilation Ishq Nachaya.

=== Hosting ===
Soon after Channel V was launched in India, she landed the role of a VJ (media personality) at the music channel for more than 2 years. Sushama hosted Dream Hotels on the Lifestyle broadcaster Discovery Travel and Living, showcasing the vistas, luxurious living, décor, style and glitter of hotels uncovering high living in the truest form.

=== Acting ===
Sushama made her film debut opposite Anil Kapoor with Vivek Agnihotri's Chocolate: Deep Dark Secrets in 2005 and later appeared in Don: The Chase Begins Again and Chup Chup Ke, with Shahid Kapoor and Kareena Kapoor (both in 2006).

=== Producing and filmmaking ===
In 2008, Sushama assisted Rajat Kapoor on his project Rectangular Love story.

In 2009, she was introduced to current producing partner Sanjay Bhattacharjee through a common friend. After realizing that they had common goals related to the filmmaking business, distribution and film marketing, they met Aryan Bros. from Delhi, who at that time were also seeking to get into the film industry. In June 2009, with funding from Aryan Bros., Reddy and Bhattacharjee established the production company Seven Island Studios Pvt. Ltd. Seven Island and Aryan Bros' Dus Tola went on the floors in late 2009, and was released on 22 October 2010. They are now working on her next projects – National Roaming, which is a comic-caper, The Stamp Collector, which is based on Vishwapriya Iyenger's short story No Letter From Mother and another one based on a Tibetan family's struggle for survival. Work is underway on the next film, tentatively titled National Roaming, which is a crazy comic caper in the jungle.

Sushama has started her own television production company, Niki Redi Productions and is developing content for travel shows on international Lifestyle channels such as TLC. She has also produced and anchored her show on TLC called Go India Maharashtra, which was telecast in December 2012.

== Filmography ==
=== Actor ===
Year	Film	Role	Language	Notes
2005	Chocolate: Deep Dark Secrets	Monsoon Iyer	Hindi	Debut film
2006	Don: The Chase Begins Again	Geeta Ahuja	Hindi	
2006	Chup Chup Ke	Pooja Rao	Hindi	
2009	Fear Factor – Khatron Ke Khiladi Level 2	Self	Hindi	Television based reality show

=== Producer ===
Year	Film	Language	Notes
2010	Dus Tola	Hindi	co-produced by Sanjay Bhattacharjee
