= Chocolate (2005 film) =

2005 Indian film by Vivek Agnihotri

- Directed by: Vivek Agnihotri
- Written by: Rohit Malhotra; Vivek Agnihotri
- Produced by: Vibha Bhatnagar; Ragini Sona; Manoj Bhatnagar
- Starring: Anil Kapoor; Suniel Shetty; Irrfan Khan; Emraan Hashmi; Arshad Warsi; Tanushree Dutta; Sushma Reddy
- Narrated by: Irrfan Khan; Tanushree Dutta
- Cinematography: Attar Singh Saini
- Edited by: Vivek Agnihotri; Satyajeet Gazmer
- Music by: Pritam
- Distributed by: Eros International
- Release date: 16 September 2005
- Running time: 162 minutes
- Country: India
- Language: Hindi

Chocolate is a 2005 Indian Hindi-language crime thriller film directed by Vivek Agnihotri in his directorial debut. The film stars an ensemble cast of Anil Kapoor, Suniel Shetty, Irrfan Khan, Emraan Hashmi, Tanushree Dutta, and Sushma Reddy. The film is inspired by the 1995 American film The Usual Suspects.

== Plot ==
Following the 11 September 2001 attacks in the US, an explosion in a motorboat shatters the peace on Christmas Eve in London, UK. Following this incident is a daring robbery on an armoured vehicle carrying billions of pounds. The police suspect two Indians: Pipi and Sim. They are interrogated extensively amidst allegations that they may be linked to Al-Qaeda.

Crime journalist Monsoon Iyer learns about their plight, meets them, and asks advocate Krishan Pandit to represent them in court. Krishan meets with the two, listens to their side of the incidents, is convinced of their innocence, and is quite sure that the two incidents, as well as the deaths of three of Pipi and Sim's friends Chip, Deva and Rocker, were the actions of a notorious terrorist named Murtaza Arzai.

Listening to Sim and Pipi, Krishan investigates and pieces together the story of how the three died on the boat that night at Arzai's hand. Krishan succeeds in persuading the presiding judge of their innocence, and the charges against them are dismissed and sealed. However, a fleeting glance at a magazine lying on a street table tells Krishan that the names in Sim and Pipi's story match up with names on the magazine's cover stories and the story must therefore be made up. Sim and Pipi escape scot free, to meet with Rocker, Devaa, and Chip whose supposed deaths turn out to be part of the ruse.

== Cast ==
- Anil Kapoor as Advocate Krishan Pandit
- Suniel Shetty as Rocker
- Irrfan Khan as Pipi
- Emraan Hashmi as Deva
- Arshad Warsi as Chip
- Tanushree Dutta as Simran Khemu
- Emma Bunton as Tabetha Gagoh
- Sushma Reddy as Crime Journalist Monsoon Iyer
- Murli Sharma as Bilal Shaikh
- Raj Zutshi as Roshan Gandhi
- Jagmohan Mundhra as Vivek Agnihotri
- Kelly Dorjee as Roshan Abbas
- Vishwajeet Pradhan as Honey
- Ashwin Mushran
- Yasmin Haines
- Mumaith Khan as an item number "Jhuki Jhuki"
- Tom Bates as Security Guard

== Soundtrack ==
Chocolate

Soundtrack album by Pritam Chakraborty
- Released: 23 July 2005 (Digital Release); 16 September 2005 (Film)
- Genre: Feature Film soundtrack
- Length: 44:06
- Label: T-Series
- Producer: Pritam Chakraborty

Pritam Chakraborty chronology
Dhoom (2004)	Chocolate (2005)	Garam Masala (2005)

The soundtrack of Chocolate is composed by Pritam.

All music is composed by Pritam Chakraborty.

No.	Title	Lyrics	Singer(s)	Length
1.	"Halka Halka Sa Yeh Sama"	Mayur Puri	Sonu Nigam, Sunidhi Chauhan	5:10
2.	"Zahreeli Raatein"	Praveen Bharadwaj	K.K.	4:50
3.	"Jhuki Jhuki"	Dev Kohli	Sunidhi Chauhan, Kailash Kher	5:17
4.	"Mummy"	Mayur Puri	Sunidhi Chauhan	4:43
5.	"Panaahon Mein Mohabbat Ki"	Praveen Bharadwaj	Kunal Ganjawala	4:12
6.	"Bheega Bheega"	Ajeet Srivastava	Indee & Sunidhi Chauhan	5:05
7.	"Halka Halka Sa Yeh Sama" (Remix)	Mayur Puri	Sonu Nigam, Sunidhi Chauhan	4:23
8.	"Khalish"	Mayur Puri	Suzanne & Kunal Ganjawala	5:23
9.	"Chocolate Theme"		Instrumental	5:03
Total length:				44:06

== Reception ==
Jaspreet Pandohar of BBC.com gave the film one star out of five, writing, ″With unnecessary songs and repetitive shots of the cast walking aimlessly through Piccadilly Circus and Oxford Street, the element of suspense is soon lost as Krish spends nearly three hours attempting to discover what's really going on. But by the end you neither care what the truth is, nor what happens to the motley crew, even though it's as plain as daylight. With all the wooden performances and nonsense goings-on, watching Chocolate is no sweet experience.″ Taran Adarsh of IndiaFM gave the film 1.5 stars out of 5, writing, ″On the whole, CHOCOLATE is body beautiful, minus soul. At the box-office, it's a film that may not appeal to the aam Indian junta. Disappointing!″ Anupama Chopra of India Today wrote, ″The film wants to be The Usual Suspects, so the plot is copied from Bryan Singer's classic. Chocolate is intermittently interesting but viewers familiar with the 1995 Singer movie will hardly be surprised by the twists and turns. Agnihotri has attitude but next time, perhaps, he should try creating something original.″

Merril Diniz of Rediff.com gave a positive review, writing, ″English films buffs may experience a sense of déjà vu while watching the film. For one, the format of the plot unfolds through snippets of conversation between two parties, this may ring a bell. Ditto for the courtroom drama and the verdict that follows. The look and feel of the film also seem 'inspired'. Figure out the analogies for yourselves. In the meantime, enjoy the ride and relish the climax, or rather, the anticlimax.″

== Controversy ==
Tanushree Dutta accused director Vivek Agnihotri of inappropriate behavior with her during the making of the film. She alleged that during one of the scenes in which Irrfan Khan had to emote, Agnihotri had asked Dutta to remove her clothes and dance off camera for Khan to emote better. Khan then reportedly shut Agnihotri down by letting the latter know he knows how to act and the antics weren't required.
