= Engeyum Kadhal =

- Theatrical release poster
- Directed by: Prabhu Deva
- Story by: A. C. Mugil; Ravi Chakravarthy; Jayakannan; Premsai
- Produced by: Kalpathi S. Aghoram; Kalpathi S. Ganesh; Kalpathi S. Suresh
- Starring: Ravi Mohan; Hansika Motwani
- Cinematography: Nirav Shah
- Edited by: Anthony
- Music by: Harris Jayaraj
- Production company: AGS Entertainment
- Distributed by: Sun Pictures
- Release date: 6 May 2011
- Running time: 125 minutes
- Country: India
- Language: Tamil

Engeyum Kadhal (transl. Love is Everywhere) is a 2011 Indian Tamil-language romantic comedy film written and directed by Prabhu Deva from a story written by A. C. Mugil, Ravi Chakravarthy, Jayakannan and Premsai. Produced by AGS Entertainment, the film stars Ravi Mohan (credited as Jayam Ravi) and Hansika Motwani in lead roles. In the film, an Indian girl living in France falls in love with a wealthy Indian man.

The film was announced in October 2009 and was known under the title Ich, before being changed to the current title. Filming began in April 2010 and completed that November, where it was predominantly shot in Paris, and two songs were shot in Santorini and New Zealand. The film features music composed by Harris Jayaraj, cinematography handled by Nirav Shah and editing done by Anthony.

The film, distributed by Sun Pictures, was released on 6 May 2011. It was nominated for two Filmfare and South Indian International Movie Awards each, three Vijay Awards and won an Ananda Vikatan Cinema Award.

== Plot ==
The film is set in France and Italy. Kamal, a young billionaire, doesn't believe in love. He works hard for 11 months and takes a month's break from all the work related commitments. Celloist Kayalvizhi (Kayal for short or Lolita for Kamal) believes in true love and is highly fascinated with Indian culture. Then she sees Kamal one day and it is love at first sight for her, but before she can follow him he gets into his car and goes away. Her father Rajasekhar runs a small detective agency in France and Kayal often reads her father's case files for interesting stories. One day, Rajasekhar gets a new client who wants to know about his girlfriend's mystery man. After a brief investigation, Rajasekhar finds that his client's girl friend is dating Kamal.

Sonu gets angry and decides to kill Kamal. Kayal overhears the conversation and deciding to save them, rushes to their hotel. Sonu has sent some men to kill Kamal and he is on his way there. When Kayal reaches Kamal's room she finds the door locked from inside. Without knowing what to do Kayal tries to get inside through the balcony. When she was about to enter she hears a gunshot and faints in the balcony. By this time Sonu's girlfriend has escaped from there. Just when Kamal is about to win the fight Sonu enters the room and threatens Kamal with a gun. Then he searches for his girlfriend he cannot find her, instead he find Kayal in the balcony. Then he thinks that Rajasekar has made a mistake and apologises to Kamal. Understanding that Kayal has saved him, he tries to get to know her better during their incidental meetings and, even though Kayal tries to resist, she cannot. Kamal leaves Paris for some board meetings and Kayal is heart broken.

When he returns he does not remember her immediately even though she has been waiting for him. Kayal tries to make Kamal love her by pretending to have many boyfriends. Kamal does get a bit jealous and he decides to get a detective to know everything about her and her possible boyfriends. Initially the detective he chooses is Rajasekar Kayal's dad. Kamal does not know Kayal's name, but he says about all her fake boyfriends. Rajasekar realises that the girl's boyfriends' names are same as the names of the people in his case files realises that Kamal is actually inquiring about his daughter, Kayal, as only she has seen them. He tells Kamal about it and asks him to leave his daughter as he always does when someone falls in love with him. Kamal agrees and tells Kayal that he will be leaving for Germany and that he does not know when he will return. Kayal is heartbroken. Kamal tries to forget her but find that he cannot as he realises that he too loves her. So he returns to Paris and finds her. But Kayal is angry with him and walks away. Kamal runs after her saying that he is in love with her and will never leave her and they will be together thereafter.

== Cast ==
Opening credits

- Ravi Mohan as R. Kamal
- Hansika Motwani as Kayalvizhi (Lolita)
- Suman as Rajasekhar
- Raju Sundaram as Raju
- Manoj Pahwa as Rajasekhar's client
- Kotapadi J. Rajesh as Rajesh

Uncredited

- Prakash Raj as himself
- Prabhu Deva as the narrator

Special appearances in the song "Dhimu Dhimu"

- Uma Padmanabhan as Kamal's mother
- Ishari K. Ganesh as Kamal's MD
- J. Rajiv Choudhry as Kamal's father

== Production ==
=== Development ===
In 2008, AGS Entertainment agreed to finance a film starring Ravi Mohan, and directed by Prabhu Deva. In October 2009, it was reported that Ravi, who was already signed on to Kannabiran, directed by Ameer, opted to prioritise Prabhu Deva's film due to the other film's perceived delay in start. Prabhu described the film as a love story revolving around a man who raised in a foreign country and a girl born abroad but fascinated with Indian culture, and how the two people meet and fall in love with each other. Prabhu stated that, "Usually, the boy falls for the girl, but in this film it is the other way round. So the hero has to look irresistible". The film's technical crew consisted of musician Harris Jayaraj, cinematographer Nirav Shah, editor Anthony and art director Nagu. Former actor Premsai co-wrote the script with A. C. Mugil, Ravi Chakravarthy and Jayakannan, and also served as the co-director. The film was initially developed under the title Ich, but was renamed Engeyum Kadhal.

=== Casting ===
Ravi plays the role of Kamal, a young billionaire. Since Ravi had lost nearly 12 kilograms (26 lb) for Peraanmai (2009), Deva felt the look was ideal for the role and was further advised to remove his moustache to make him look younger. For the lead actress, 158 women were auditioned for the role before Hansika Motwani was selected. This was her sophomore Tamil film after Mappillai (2019). As she was unfamiliar with Tamil, Motwani had to learn the language during the breaks of the filming schedule. Savitha Radhakrishnan dubbed for Motwani. The film did not feature any primary antagonists. Prabhu's brother Raju Sundaram was selected to play Ravi's friend, and was the sole comedic actor in the film as Prabhu denied casting any comedic actors in the film. Prabhu appeared in a cameo in the song "Engeyum Kadhal" though he was not credited. Prakash Raj also appeared in a cameo.

=== Filming ===
"In France, you see lovers everywhere — holding hands on the roads, at the restaurants and in the malls. After deciding on the story, we felt France was the best place to shoot the film."

— Prabhu Deva, on the location scouting for Engeyum Kadhal,

After Prabhu and Jayaraj completed the music sessions in Sydney, principal photography began in April 2010. Prabhu planned to shoot major portions of the film in Paris, with the first schedule beginning in French Riviera. During the filming schedule, Prabhu praised Motwani's commitment for filming a sequence which was delayed by two days to heavy rains there and on the third day, she had shot for 15 hours to not ensure any further delays. The entire Paris portions were shot within 46–53 days. (Note: Motwani claimed that while the Paris portions were shot within 46 days, whereas Prabhu claimed it took them 53 days to shoot those sequences.) The song "Nenjil Nenjil" was shot at Santorini, and "Thee Illai" was shot in New Zealand. Filming was completed in November 2010 after the song shoot was wrapped.

During the filming, there were rumours surrounding an affair between Prabhu and Motwani. The latter denied such claims saying that Prabhu was like an elder brother and a "mentor" to her.

== Themes and influences ==
Priyanka Sundar of The Indian Express noted that the film was inspired by Love in the Afternoon (1957) which described a relationship between a middle-aged American playboy business magnate and the young daughter of a private detective.

== Soundtrack ==
The music is scored by Harris Jayaraj. The audio rights were purchased by Sony Music India. The audio launch was held on 8 November 2010.

== Release ==
Engeyum Kadhal was earlier scheduled to be released on 5 November 2010 coinciding with Diwali, but was delayed as one song had to be shot. Though Motwani hoped that the film would be released during the Valentine's Day weekend in February 2011, it was again delayed due to the 2011 Cricket World Cup and the 2011 Tamil Nadu Legislative Assembly election. The film was distributed by Sun Pictures and was eventually released on 6 May. It was dubbed in Telugu as Ninnu Choosthe Love Vasthundi, which was released on 13 April 2012.

=== Critical reception ===
Pavithra Srinivasan from Rediff.com gave 2.5 out of 5 stating that "Engeyum Kadhal is one of those movies that promises a lot, but delivers little. Watch the film only if you're in the mood for arm-chair travel to Paris and foot-tapping music". Sify stated that the film "tries too hard to maintain a tempo, but save for the crackling chemistry and some charming moments involving Ravi and Hansika, the film is just average". The New Indian Express wrote, "The director has exploited well the locales of exotic Paris and the result is the film has a colourful glossy look. But the style scores over content. What is dampening is the predictability of the sequence of events". Nanditha Hariharan of The Hindu wrote "Engeyum Kadhal has a lot of pink, hearts, red, mush, chocolates and all the Valentine's Day crap but absolutely no love." Reviewing the Telugu version Ninnu Choosthe Love Vasthundi, The Times of India wrote, "The music is the best part of the movie, however the extreme predictability of the narrative is what weighs it down".

=== Accolades ===
| Award (Note: Awards, festivals and organisations are in alphabetical order.) | Date of ceremony (Note: Date is linked to the article about the awards held that year, wherever possible.) | Category | Recipient(s) and Nominee(s) | Result | Ref. |
|---|---|---|---|---|---|
| Ananda Vikatan Cinema Awards | 5 January 2012 | Best Choreographer | Raju Sundaram – ("Nangaai") | Won | |
| The Chennai Times Film Awards | 22 June 2012 | Best Youth Film | Engeyum Kadhal – AGS Entertainment | Nominated | |
| Filmfare Awards South | 7 July 2012 | Best Lyricist – Tamil | Thamarai – ("Engeyum Kadhal") | Nominated | |
| Filmfare Awards South | 7 July 2012 | Best Male Playback Singer – Tamil | Richard – ("Nangaai") | Nominated | |
| Big Tamil Melody Awards | 5 February 2012 | Best Music Director | Harris Jayaraj | Won | |
| Big Tamil Melody Awards | 5 February 2012 | Best Album of the Year | Engeyum Kadhal – Harris Jayaraj | Won | |
| South Indian International Movie Awards | 21–22 June 2012 | Best Actress in a Leading Role | Hansika Motwani | Nominated | |
| South Indian International Movie Awards | 21–22 June 2012 | Best Comedian | Raju Sundaram | Nominated | |
| Vijay Awards | 16 June 2012 | Best Music Director | Harris Jayaraj | Nominated | |
| Vijay Awards | 16 June 2012 | Best Male Playback Singer | Karthik – ("Dhimu Dhimu") | Nominated | |
| Vijay Awards | 16 June 2012 | Favourite Heroine | Hansika Motwani | Nominated | |
| Vijay Awards | 16 June 2012 | Favourite Song | "Nangaai" | Nominated | |

== In other media ==
In a comedy sequence in All in All Azhagu Raja (2013), Kanthasamy (Aadukalam Naren) tells his daughter Chitra Devi Priya (Kajal Aggarwal) that she cannot sing well and laments on his reaction to her singing "Nangaai".
