= Premsai =

Indian film director and former actor

- Born: Chennai
- Occupation: Screen Writer / Film director
- Years active: 1998–present

Premsai is an Indian film director and former actor. As an actor, he was acclaimed for playing many different prominent roles in Tamil and Telugu television serials and tele films. Later he ventured in to Direction. His debut film was Tamilselvanum Thaniyar Anjalum starring Jai, Santhanam, Yami Gautam in Tamil and Courier Boy Kalyan in Telugu with Nitin & Yami Gautam. It was produced by Gautham Vasudev Menon.

== Early life ==
Premsai started his media career in the year 1998 first he ventured into acting in Serials and tele films in Tamil and Telugu. He was introduced by AVM Productions in a teleserial by legendary director S. P. Muthuraman he featured in a single episode in that serial. He was choosy in selecting scripts which helped him work with the best of technicians such as Balu Mahendra, K. Balachander, A.C.Trilokchander, S.P.Muthuraman, Revathy, Venkat and Ramesh Raja.

== Direction ==
Premsai moved from acting and ventured into direction to explore his creative abilities into writing and direction. He directed his first telefilm Manasa Vaacha Karma with Venu Arvind in the lead which got him a very good recognition and Director Prabhu Deva noticed and he went on to assist him in films as associate director in the film Shankar Dada Zindabad with mega star Chiranjeevi in the lead.

He later worked as a co-director & dialogue writer for Prabhu deva in Engeyum Kadhal starring Jayam Ravi and Hansika Motwani in the lead. As a director he debuted with a bilingual film titled Tamilselvanum Thaniyar Anjalum starring Jai, Santhanam, Yami Gautam in the lead in Tamil and Courier Boy Kalyan in Telugu with Nithin & Yami Gautam in the lead . It was produced by Gautham Vasudev Menon.

== Filmography ==
=== Director ===
Year	Film	Cast	Language	Status
2015	Courier Boy Kalyan	Nithiin, Yami Gautam	Telugu	Released
2016	Tamilselvanum Thaniyar Anjalum	Jai, Yami Gautam	Tamil	Released

=== Co-Director, Associate Director ===
Film	Cast	Language	Role
Shankar Dada Zindabad	Chiranjeevi	Telugu	As an Associate Director
Engeyum Kadhal	Jayam Ravi, Hansika Motwani	Tamil	Dialogue Writer & Co-director

=== Actor ===
==== TeleSerial — Tamil ====
TeleSerial	Director	Channel
Chinna Chinna Aasai	Revathy	Sun TV
Nirangal	Sundar . K. Vijayan	Sun TV
Kadhai Neram	Balu Mahendra	Sun TV
Archanai Pookal	R.V.Ramesh Raj	Sun TV
Amma	Solai Raja	Sun TV
Sharadha	Sripriya	Sun TV
Avargal	Ganesh	Sun TV
Nilavai Pidipom	Venkat	Raj TV
En Thozhi, En Kadhali, En Maniavi	Charles	Star Vijay
Simran Thirai — Anuvum Naanum	Ahathiyan	Jaya TV
Thangamana Purushan	Sundar.K.Vijayan	kalaingnar TV

==== TeleSerial — Telugu ====
TeleSerial	Banner	Channel
Kalisi Undaam Ra	Balaji Telefilms	Gemini TV
Nine Pellaadutha	Radaan	Gemini TV
Oka Sthree Katha	AVM	Gemini TV
Suryavamsam	Radaan	Gemini TV
Janaki	AVM	Gemini TV
hrudayam		Gemini TV
Talambrallu	E TV	E TV

==== Films ====
- Rajadhi Raja (2009) and many more

== Awards ==
Year	Award	Category
2004	Nandi Award	Best actor for Talambraallu (Telugu tele Serial)
2008	Mylapore Academy Award	Best actor for Thangamana Purushan (Tamil tele Serial)
