= Sameera Reddy =

Former Indian actress (born 1978)

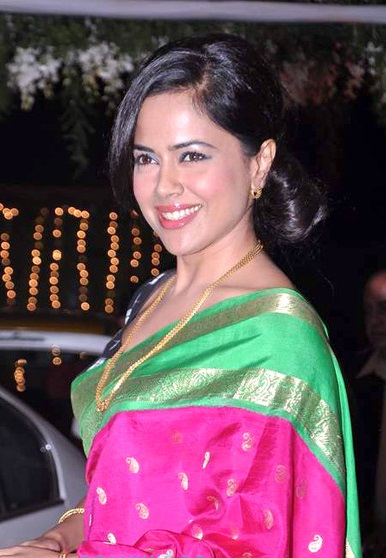
- Born: 14 December 1978 (age 47); Bombay, Maharashtra, India
- Education: Sydenham College
- Occupation: Actress
- Years active: 2002–2013, 2024–present
- Height: 170 cm (5 ft 7 in)
- Spouse: Akshai Varde (m. 2014)
- Children: 2
- Relatives: Sushama Reddy (sister); Meghna Reddy (sister)

Sameera Reddy (born 14 December 1978) is an Indian actress who primarily worked in Hindi, Tamil and Telugu language films. She made her film debut with the 2002 film Maine Dil Tujhko Diya. Sameera is best known for starring in films such as Darna Mana Hai (2003), Musafir (2004), Jai Chiranjeeva (2005), Taxi No. 9211 (2006), Ashok (2006), Race (2008), Vaaranam Aayiram (2008), De Dana Dan (2009), Aakrosh (2010), Nadunisi Naaygal (2011), Vettai (2012) and Tezz (2012).

== Early life ==
Sameera Reddy was born on 14 December 1978 in Bombay (present day Mumbai), Maharashtra to a Telugu father and a Mangalorean Konkani mother. Her mother Nakshatra, referred to as Niki by her daughters and the media, was a microbiologist and worked with an NGO. She has two older sisters, Meghna, a former VJ and supermodel, and Sushama, a Bollywood actress and model. She attended the Bombay Scottish School in Mumbai and graduated from Sydenham College.

Sameera Reddy described herself as a "tomboy" and "the ugly duckling in the family", while citing: "I was plump, had glasses and my glam quotient was rather low till I was 19."

== Career ==
Sameera Reddy first appeared in ghazal singer Pankaj Udhas's "Aur Aahista" music video in 1997. She was meant to make her debut as an actress in Saravana Subbiah's Tamil film Citizen, during the early 2000s, but eventually did not feature. She made her screen debut in the 2002 Hindi film Maine Dil Tujhko Diya opposite Sohail Khan. It was a box office failure. Film critic Taran Adarsh noted, "Sameera is plain mediocre. She needs to polish her acting skills, work on her facial expressions and improve diction."

Following her debut, Sameera Reddy earned recognition with her performance in the films: Darna Mana Hai (2003), Musafir (2004), Jai Chiranjeeva (2005), Taxi No. 9211 (2006), Ashok (2006), Race (2008), Vaaranam Aayiram (2008), De Dana Dan (2009), Aakrosh (2010), Nadunisi Naaygal (2011), Vettai (2012) and Tezz (2012). In 2013, Sameera appeared in the Kannada film Varadhanayaka opposite Sudeepa. The film was a box office success and following this Sameera Reddy took a break from acting. In 2024, her long delayed film Naam was released, where she appeared opposite Ajay Devgn.

In Taxi No. 9211, she played a businessman's lover opposite John Abraham. It was a box office success. In Race, she played a police officer's assistant alongside Anil Kapoor. The film emerged as the fifth-highest-grossing Hindi film of 2008. Taran Adarsh noted, "Sameera Reddy excels as the dumb girl. It's a tough job and she does well." Reddy earned acclaim for her playing a college topper in Vaaranam Aayiram opposite Suriya. The film was one of the highest grossing Tamil film of 2008 and got her recognition in South India. Pavithra Srinivasan noted, "Sameera is full of life and creates a pang in your heart." A critic from Sify stated she brings an "uninhibited joie" to her role.

Sameera Reddy played a Punjabi woman in De Dana Dan opposite Suniel Shetty. It became one of the highest grossing Hindi film of 2009. She played a psychopath's victim in Nadunisi Naaygal opposite Veera, which emerged a surprise success at the box office. Gautaman Bhaskaran found it to be her "career-best" performance. In Vettai, Reddy played a talkative wife of a police officer opposite R. Madhavan. Malathi Rangarajan stated, "While Sameera performs well, she could have had a better makeover." It emerged a commercial success.

== Personal life ==
Sameera Reddy married Akshai Varde, an entrepreneur, on 21 January 2014, in a traditional Maharashtrian ceremony. They have a son and daughter.

Being a fan of American talk show hostess Oprah Winfrey, Sameera Reddy met and presented a saree to Winfrey during her visit to India.

== Media image ==
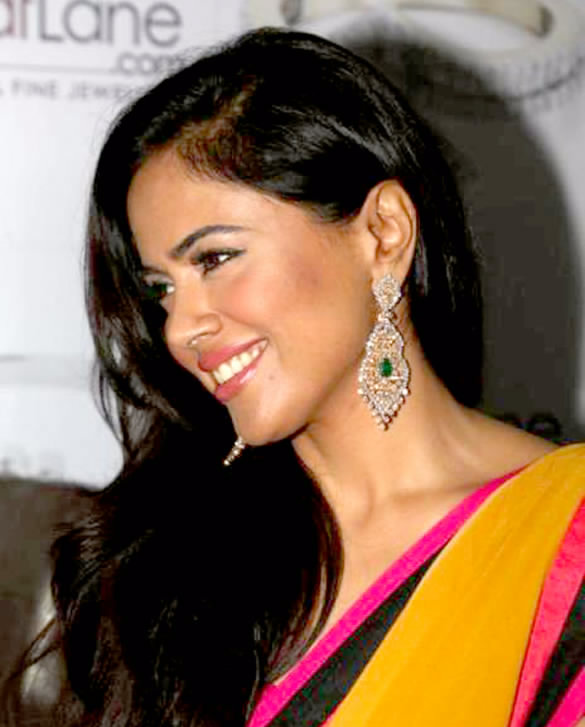
Sameera in 2012

In Rediff.com's "Best Tamil Actresses" list, Sameera Reddy was placed 4th in 2011. In the Times Most Desirable Women list, Sameera Reddy was placed 33rd in 2009, 26th in 2010 and 29th in 2011. Femina also placed her in its "50 Most Beautiful Women" list. Sameera Reddy is the first Indian actress to have her own video game, named, Sameera: The Street Fighter. Sameera Reddy also judged the Miss Sri Lanka Online contest in 2012.

== Filmography ==
=== Films ===
Year	Title	Role(s)	Language	Notes	Ref.
2002	Maine Dil Tujhko Diya	Ayesha Verma	Hindi		
2003	Darna Mana Hai	Shruti	Hindi		
2004	Plan	Sapna	Hindi		
2004	Musafir	Sam	Hindi		
2005	Narasimhudu	Parvathy	Telugu		
2005	Casualty	Anita	English	BBC Medical drama	
2005	Jai Chiranjeeva	Sailaja	Telugu		
2005	No Entry	Beach girl	Hindi	Cameo appearance	
2006	Taxi Number 9211	Rupali	Hindi		
2006	Ashok	Anjali	Telugu		
2006	Naksha	Riya	Hindi		
2007	Migration	Divya	Hindi	Short film	
2007	Fool & Final	Payal Khanna	Hindi		
2007	Ami, Yasin Ar Amar Madhubala	Rekha	Bengali		
2008	Race	Mini D'Souza	Hindi		
2008	One Two Three	Laila	Hindi		
2008	Kaalpurush	Supriya	Bengali		
2008	Vaaranam Aayiram	Meghna	Tamil	Nominated, Vijay Award for Best Debut Actress	
2009	De Dana Dan	Manpreet Oberoi	Hindi		
2010	Aasal	Sarah	Tamil		
2010	Oru Naal Varum	Meera	Malayalam		
2010	Red Alert: The War Within	Lakshmi	Hindi		
2010	Aakrosh	———	Hindi	Special appearance in song "Isak Se Meetha"	
2011	Nadunisi Naaygal	Sukanya	Tamil		
2011	Vedi	Parvathi	Tamil		
2012	Vettai	Vasanthi Thirumurthy	Tamil		
2012	Tezz	Megha	Hindi		
2012	Chakravyuh	———	Hindi	Special appearance in the song "Kunda Khola"	
2012	Krishnam Vande Jagadgurum	———	Telugu	Special appearance in the song "Sai Andri Nanu"	
2013	Varadhanayaka	Lakshmi	Kannada		
2024	Naam	Lovely	Hindi	Delayed release; Filmed in 2004	
2026	Aakhri Sawal	Pallavi Menon	Hindi		

=== Music videos ===
Year	Title	Singer(s)	Album	Ref.
1998	"Ahista"	Pankaj Udhas	Stolen Moments	
2000	"Tere Aane Ki Jab Khabar Mehke"	Jagjit Singh	Saher	

=== Video games ===
Year	Title	Role	Ref.
2006	Sameera: The Street Fighter	Ancient Warrior Princess	

== See also ==
- List of Hindi film actresses
