= Lucky Man (2023 film) =

- Theatrical release poster
- Directed by: Balaji Venugopal
- Written by: Balaji Venugopal
- Produced by: T. Kishore; Venkataswaroop Siddavarapu Reddy; Shilpa Gaddam Reddy
- Starring: Yogi Babu; Veera; Raichal Rabecca
- Cinematography: Sandeep K. Vijay
- Edited by: G. Madan
- Music by: Sean Roldan
- Production companies: Think Studios; SNS Movie Production LLP
- Distributed by: Sakthi Film Factory
- Release date: 1 September 2023
- Country: India
- Language: Tamil

Lucky Man is a 2023 Indian Tamil-language comedy drama film directed by Balaji Venugopal in his directorial debut. The film stars Yogi Babu, Veera and Raichal Rabecca. It was released on 1 September 2023 and received positive reviews from critics and audience.

== Plot ==
Murugan, a struggling real estate agent, lives with his wife Deivanai and their son. Burdened by financial troubles, his luck seems to change when he wins a car, which he comes to consider his lucky charm. Shivakumar, a short-tempered police officer, crosses paths with Murugan over a parking dispute when Murugan attempts to park near a neighbor’s house. The situation escalates until a politician intervenes, compelling Shivakumar to apologize to Murugan. A few days later, Murugan prepares to meet an important client and parks his car near his landlord’s house, only to discover the vehicle missing the next day. With the help of his friend Venkat, he files a police complaint. When the case lands with Shivakumar, the officer promises to investigate. However, Venkat suggests that Shivakumar might have stolen the car to settle a personal grudge. Encouraged by Venkat, Murugan files a complaint against Shivakumar with higher authorities. In retaliation, Shivakumar frames Murugan in a drug peddling case. Meanwhile, a group of thugs tricks Murugan into paying two lakh rupees for a wrecked car, falsely claiming it is his stolen vehicle. Obsessed with recovering his car, Murugan loses focus at work and is eventually fired. His wife, unable to cope with the mounting troubles, leaves him. Desperate, Murugan kidnaps Shivakumar’s pet dog to make the officer understand the pain of losing something precious. Over time, Murugan realizes that Shivakumar is an honest officer. He returns the dog and confesses his actions. Touched by Murugan’s sincerity, Shivakumar helps recover the car and clears Murugan's name. In the end, Murugan reunites with his family, regaining both his dignity and happiness.

== Cast ==
- Yogi Babu as Murugan
- Veera as Sivakumar
- Raichal Rabecca as Deivanai
- Abdool Lee as Venkat
- Suhasini Kumaran as Aparna, Sivakumar's fiancé
- R. S. Shivaji as Formula 1 Driving School Instructor
- Jayakumar as Pa. Ramanan
- Gowtham Sundararajan as Motivational speaker
- Hello Kandasamy as Shenbagamurthy
- Rahul Thatha as Suseenthiram Subbaiyah
- Pradeep K Vijayan as Kumaraguru
- Amit Bhargav as Amarnath Ramachandran
- Sathvick as Tamil
- Vilangu Ravi as Land buyer
- David Solomon Raja as Inspector Kamesh
- Ajith Koshy as Police inspector
- Mippu Samy as Car thief
- Rudra (dog) as Kayal
- Balaji Venugopal as RJ from Hello FM (special appearance)

== Production ==
Production on the film took place around Chennai in late 2022, and the project was first announced to the media in February 2023. The project, starring Yogi Babu and Veera, marked the directorial debut of actor Balaji Venugopal. The release of the film was briefly delayed as Yogi Babu was keen to ensure that Bommai Nayagi (2023) was released first.

== Music ==
The music was composed by Sean Roldan.

Lucky Man

Soundtrack album by Sean Roldan
- Released: 2023
- Genre: Feature film soundtrack
- Length: 14:06
- Language: Tamil
- Label: Think Music
- Producer: Sean Roldan

Sean Roldan chronology
Modern Love Chennai (2023)	Lucky Man (2023)	Vadakkupatti Ramasamy (2024)

Track listing
No.	Title	Lyrics	Singer(s)	Length
1.	"Naamadhan Raja"	Sean Roldan	Sean Roldan	3:55
2.	"Thottu Thazhuvum Thendrale"	Balaji Venugopal	Savitha Sai	3:49
3.	"Oru Vari Kadhai"	Balaji Venugopal, Sean Roldan	Pradeep Kumar	3:14
4.	"Yedhudhaan Inga Sandhosam"	Balaji Venugopal	Sanjay Subrahmanyan	3:08
Total length:				14:06

== Reception ==
The film was released on 1 September 2023 across theatres in Tamil Nadu. Bhuvanesh Chandar from The Hindu wrote "Yogi Babu shoulders a mildly entertaining drama", while Logesh Balachandran from The Times of India noted "Lucky Man is not very lucky enough to win our hearts completely, despite a good premise". Jayabhuvaneshwari B from Cinema Express wrote "Lucky Man is an interesting film that leaves you entertained but does not necessarily travel along with you after you leave the theatres".
