= Veppam =

- Theatrical release poster
- Directed by: Anjana
- Screenplay by: Anjana
- Dialogue by: I. Prabu
- Story by: Anjana
- Produced by: Gautham Vasudev Menon; Madhan; Elred Kumar; Venkat
- Starring: Nani; Nithya Menen; Karthik Kumar; Bindu Madhavi
- Cinematography: Om Prakash
- Edited by: Anthony
- Music by: Joshua Sridhar
- Production companies: Photon Kathaas; RS Infotainment
- Release date: 29 July 2011
- Running time: 135 minutes
- Country: India
- Language: Tamil

Veppam (transl. Heat) is a 2011 Indian Tamil-language crime action film written and directed by Anjana in her directoral debut. The film stars Nani, Nithya Menen, Karthik Kumar and Bindu Madhavi, with Jennifer, Sheimour Roosevelt and Muthukumar (in his film debut) in supporting roles. It marks Nani and Madhavi's Tamil debut. The story narrates events from the slum areas of Chennai, showcasing characters and their struggles. The film, jointly produced by Gautham Vasudev Menon's Photon Kathaas and RS Infotainment, began production in 2010 and was released on 29 July 2011.

== Plot ==
The film starts with Revathy walking towards the beach, into the ocean. The film is then set 18 years back in a slum in Chennai. Balaji's mother dies, and his father Jyothi, a drunkard, leaves him on the streets. Balaji works hard and ensures a decent living for his younger brother Karthik with the help of Revathy's father. Karthik, who studies at an engineering college, spends all his time with his friend Vishnu, who is also brought up in the locality. Revathy, who lives in the neighbourhood, loves Karthik. Revathy, Karthik, and Vishnu are close friends. Vishnu also owns a mechanic shop, but it is not generating enough income. His guardian pesters him to sell it and find a decent job that generates enough income to ensure financial security for the foreseeable future. Vishnu refuses as the shop is the only surviving memory of his late father.

Jyothi takes to illegal ways and makes money working for Ammaji, a drug peddler. Balaji does not want Karthik to join their father, as he left them on the streets when the brothers were younger. Jyothi supplies call girls to men in that locality. Knowing Vishnu is in love with Viji, a call girl in the locality, and also needs money because his shop is not earning enough, Jyothi decides to exploit him for his selfish gain in a drug transaction. He gives him the assignment to transport drugs to Pondicherry, promising to give him Viji if he completes the work. Vishnu takes Karthik's help and leaves for Pondicherry. Viji hears that Jyothi is planning to sell the drug to Ammaji's official enemy and tries to save Vishnu through Jyothi's assistant.

Meanwhile, Revathy's father survives a heart attack and is desperate to contact Karthik and Vishnu while in the hospital. Balaji finds Karthik in Jyothi's car and searches for him for a week. Meanwhile, Jyothi's assistant warns Vishnu about Jyothi's plan. After a week, Balaji finds Karthik in a bakery and hits him. Enraged, Karthik leaves for Vishnu's house, giving a phone to Revathy and leaving the drug in his cupboard. Vishnu searches for the drug in his bag in his house and fights with Karthik. Karthik gets hurt in the head by a chair and faints. Vishnu's guardian kills Vishnu, as the former wanted to sell Vishnu's mechanic shop. Viji dies in the depression over Vishnu's death. The police arrest Karthik, thinking that he would have killed Vishnu.

Karthik comes out with Jyothi's help. Balaji, Karthik, and Jyothi go to Ammaji, where they find that her official enemies have joined. They try to kill Jyothi, but Balaji and Karthik save him and kill everybody there, while Jyothi kills Ammaji. They go to Jyothi's house and start drinking, and upon being asked by Jyothi about the drug, Karthik replies that Revathy had found the drug in Karthik's cupboard. She took the drug to Jyothi's house, where a man tried to rape her. She escaped and dissolved the drug on the beach. Later, Balaji gives Jyothi a glass of poisoned beer for leaving them alone in their younger days. Karthik joins his brother and kills Jyothi for Vishnu's death. It is revealed that Karthik's mother died after she was poisoned. People near them agree not to let anyone know that they murdered Jyothi. The film ends as both brothers walk out of the room together.

== Cast ==
- Nani as Karthik
- Nithya Menen as Revathi
- Karthik Kumar as Vishnu
- Bindu Madhavi as Viji
- Jennifer as Ammaji
- Sheimour Roosevelt as Jyothi
- Muthukumar as Balaji (voice dubbed by Gautham Vasudev Menon)
- Ramdoss as Ammaji's henchman
- Mippu as Vishnu's friend
- Myna Nandhini
- Kovai Desingu

== Production ==
Veppam is the directorial debut of Anjana Ali Khan. She had initially signed up with another producer, but since the project failed to take off, Gautham Vasudev Menon, under whom she had worked as an assistant director, stepped in and took over the production. Bindu Madhavi was cast after Anjana noticed her modelling assignments, making her Tamil debut. Nani and Nithya Menen were cast after Anjana saw them in the Telugu film Ala Modalaindi (2011), with Veppam also marking Nani's Tamil debut. The film was supposed to be Menen's Tamil debut before 180 (2011) became her first Tamil release. When Karthik Kumar was offered by Anjana to act, he declined due to a scheduling conflict and suggested two other actors. Anjana finalised one of them but production delays led to scheduling issues for that actor and he could no longer commit, so Karthik agreed when approached again. Having been typecast as an American mappillai for much of his career, he hoped playing a slum dweller in Veppam would break that stereotype. Muthukumar, previously a Koothu-P-Pattarai artiste, made his film acting debut. Filming was completed in 46 days; It was mostly filmed in and around Chennai, with song sequencess being shot in Mahabalipuram, Pondicherry and Kodaikanal.

== Soundtrack ==
The film's music was composed by Joshua Sridhar. He noted that he got this film offer from Anjana after Kalloori (2007). The soundtrack, which features seven tracks, was released by Suhasini Maniratnam on 31 December 2010, at Sathyam Cinemas, Chennai.

Reviewing the album, Pavithra Srinivasan of Rediff.com wrote, "Listening to the album as a whole, you'll have to admit that while the songs aren't terrible, they never do rise to any sort of musical brilliance".

All lyrics are written by Na. Muthukumar.

Track listing
No.	Title	Singer(s)	Length
1.	"Oru Devathai"	Clinton Cerejo, Shweta Mohan	06:02
2.	"Mazhai Varum Arikuri"	Suzanne D'Mello	04:28
3.	"Minnalaa"	Benny Dayal	05:13
4.	"Kaatril Eeram"	Karthik, Sricharan	04:06
5.	"Raani Naan"	Apoorva	03:59
6.	"Mazhai Varum Arikuri" (male)	Naresh Iyer	04:28
7.	"Veppam"	Joshua Sridhar, Naresh Iyer	02:38
Total length:			30:54

== Release ==
Though Veppam began production in 2010 and was completed in 46 days, it was only released on 29 July 2011. The film was also dubbed in Telugu as Sega. Produced for approximately US$550,000, the domestic theatrical rights of Veppam were sold for US$600,000, while the television rights, international theatrical rights and the rights to the Telugu dubbed version had been sold for a total of US$270,000.

== Reception ==
Pavithra Srinivasan of Rediff.com gave 2.5 out of 5, feeling that "a tauter screenplay, more logic in the sequences and realistic dialogues would have made Veppam an eminently enjoyable film". IANS said, "the movie has some positives in terms of looks and narrative style, but it lacks the punch." Sify wrote that "Veppam has everything to hold the audiences interest- romance, drama, violence and slick packaging. It is certainly worth a look." N. Venkateswaran of The Times of India wrote, "Swear words and swagger do not gangsters make [sic], something director Anjana failed to factor in while working on the movie. So while we have some fearsome looking gangsters in well-shot frames, they fail to strike a chord and end up looking like caricatures." The New Indian Express wrote, "The scenes are disjoined, the narration jumpy, and the characters neither seeming to connect to each other nor to the audience [...] A more coherent script and a stronger grip on the narration would have worked to the film's advantage".
