= Dinosaurs (film) =

Indian Tamil-language action film

- Release poster
- Directed by: M. R. Madhavan
- Written by: M. R. Madhavan
- Produced by: Srinivas Sambandam
- Starring: Udhay Karthik; Rishi Rithvik; Saipriya Deva
- Cinematography: Jones V. Anand
- Edited by: R. Kalaivanan
- Music by: Bobo Shashi
- Production company: Galaxy Pictures
- Distributed by: Romeo Pictures
- Release date: 28 July 2023
- Country: India
- Language: Tamil

Dinosaurs is a 2023 Indian Tamil-language action film written and directed by M. R. Madhavan. The film stars Udhay Karthik, Rishi Rithvik, Saipriya Deva and Maara in the lead roles. The film was produced by Srinivas Sambandam under the banners of Galaxy Pictures.

== Cast ==
- Udhay Karthik as Mannu
- Rishi Rithvik as Dhana
- Saipriya Deva as Deepa
- Maara as Durai
- D. Maneksha as Salaiyar
- Kavin Jay Babu as Kiliyappan
- T. N. Arun Balaji as Thulukanam
- Saipriya Deva as Deepa
- Yamini Chander as Yamini
- Janaki Suresh as Mannu's mother
- Manimaran Srinivasan as Mannu's uncle
- Jothi as Durai's mother
- Tara Krish as Kiliyappan's sister
- C. Sathyaseelan as Kiliyappan's driver
- Uma Rani as Salaiyar's wife
- Sathish as Manoharan
- Purushoth as Assistant Commissioner
- Eswari as Thulukanam's wife
- Senthil as Bus Conductor (guest appearance)
- Ramana as Arumugam (guest appearance)

== Production ==
Madhavan, who had previously worked as an assistant director to Suraj and M. Saravanan, began work on the film in early 2020. After narrating the script to over thirty different actors, Madhavan opted to select Avishek Karthik for the lead role, expressing the importance of having a relatively unknown lead actor to suit the script. He had been recommended to contact Karthik after interacting with filmmaker H. Vinoth. For the film, Karthik adapted a different stage name of Udhay Karthik. Rishi Rithvik, who had played lead role in the film Attu (2017) was cast in a supporting role.

Production on the film began in early 2020 and continued for 30 days, before being paused as a result of the COVID-19 pandemic. The shoot restarted following the lifting of government restrictions and was mostly complete by the end of 2020. A first look poster was subsequently released by Karthik's cousin, actress Jhanvi Kapoor, in December 2020.

The film garnered attention during its promotional trail in April 2023, owing to remarks made about the director's appearance by Mysskin, who attended a trailer release event as a guest. Prior to the release of the film in July 2023, the production house Romeo Pictures announced plans of collaborating with director Madhavan again for their next venture.

== Reception ==
Logesh Balachandran of The Times of India stated that "Overall, DieNoSirs delivers an ambitious and engaging gangster-drama experience, offering both highs and lows along the way" and gave 3 stars of 5 stars. A critic from Nakkheeran wrote that "If the second half had given the same goosebumps as the first half, the film would have been talked about even more. However, some episodes that are seen here and there in the entire film are well made and make us enjoy the film." Shameena Parveen of Samayam gave 3 stars out of 5 and stated that the director has given a different take on the already familiar gangster drama. ABP Nadu rated 3 out of 5 and gave a mixed review.
