= Nadunisi Naaygal =

- Theatrical release poster
- Directed by: Gautham Vasudev Menon
- Written by: Gautham Vasudev Menon
- Produced by: Reshma Ghatala; Venkat Somasundaram; Elred Kumar; Madan
- Starring: Veera; Sameera Reddy; Avishek Karthik
- Cinematography: Manoj Paramahamsa
- Edited by: Anthony
- Production companies: Photon Kathaas; RS Infotainment
- Release date: 18 February 2011
- Running time: 110 minutes
- Country: India
- Language: Tamil
- Budget: ₹3.5 crore

Nadunisi Naaygal (transl. Midnight Dogs) is a 2011 Indian Tamil-language psychological thriller film written and directed by Gautham Vasudev Menon and produced by Photon Kathaas Productions and RS Infotainment. The film stars Veera, Sameera Reddy and Avishek Karthik, with Swapna Abraham and Ashwin Kakumanu (in his debut) in other pivotal roles. It revolves around a man who, as a consequence of suffering sexual abuse as a child, becomes a serial killer.

The film notably has no score, instead featuring sounds designed by Renganaath Ravee. Cinematography and editing were handled by Manoj Paramahamsa and Anthony, respectively. Nadunisi Naaygal was released on 18 February 2011 to mixed reviews and did not perform well at the box office.

== Plot ==
Samar, an 8-year-old motherless boy, lives with his father in Mumbai. The father leads a colourful life, indulging his sexual passions. Samar is sexually abused by his father and is rescued by his neighbour Meenakshi Amma, a middle-aged single woman. She names him Veera, takes him under her wing, and protects him. Daunted and chased by the ghosts of his painful past, Veera rapes Meenakshi Amma. She, though reluctant at first, indulges in the act. After coming back to her senses the next morning, she refuses Veera's apology and decides to marry her colleague.

On her first night, when the couple consummates their marriage, Veera stabs the man brutally and sets him and the room on fire. Meenakshi Amma is injured in the fire. After treatment, he brings back the scar-faced woman to his bungalow. After a few weeks, Veera meets a girl named Priya on the internet, and they fall for each other. He invites her home, and they grow intimate, interrupted by a scream from Priya because Meenakshi Amma stabs her brutally. She orders Veera to cut off Priya's hair as she wants it.

In the following years, Veera kidnaps women, rapes them, and finally kills them in cold blood. As the murders continue, Veera stumbles upon Sukanya, a girl he fell in love with in 10th grade, at a theatre with her boyfriend Arjun. He lies to her, saying he had gone with another girl, and offers her a ride home. An upset Sukanya agrees but does not know that Veera had been stalking her. Veera suddenly slaps her, making her unconscious, and kisses her. Disgusted and terrified, Sukanya then finds Arjun in a pool of blood in the backseat of the car. Sukanya tries to escape and engages in a fist fight with Veera but is stabbed. Police surround the car and take Sukanya to a hospital.

A bystander who had sensed something suspicious about Veera's car follows him to his bungalow and informs Assistant Commissioner Vijay. Veera takes Sukanya to his bungalow and informs Meenakshi Amma that he loves Sukanya truly and intends to live the rest of his life with her. Sukanya tries to escape but is captured by Veera. Veera tells Sukanya that Samar is responsible for all these events and murdered all the victims, including Meenakshi Amma. He says that Meenakshi Amma is actually dead, but Samar still thinks she is alive. In a few moments, Vijay arrives at the residence and is confronted by four Rottweilers ready to pounce on him.

Alarmed by this, Veera tries to fend him off. He returns to take Sukanya into a hidden basement, where another two girls are held captive, with their heads half-tonsured. Veera locks Sukanya in the basement and fights with Vijay. Sukanya, meanwhile, finds a way into the bungalow, takes a gun, and shoots at Veera. He is shocked as he thinks it was Meenakshi Amma who shot at him. All this is recorded on tape as Veera narrates it to Vijay. Finally, Veera is taken to a mental asylum, where another patient is also shown as a psychopath, victimised due to child sexual abuse.

== Cast ==
- Veera as Veera alias Samar
  - Kunal as eight-year-old Samar
  - Sabarish as twelve-year-old Samar
- Sameera Reddy as Sukanya (Voice dubbed by Chinmayi and Gee Gee)
- Avishek Karthik as Vijay
- Swapna Abraham as Meenakshi (Voice dubbed by Swarnamalya)
- Ashwin Kakumanu as Arjun
- Krishnapriya as Sandhya
- Ravi as Krishna
- Recine as Veera's father
- Meera Sivaramakrishnan as Sukanya's mother
- Harilal as Sukanya's father
- Gopakumar as Sukanya's grandmother
- Sudharma as Sukanya's sister
- Maneksha as Maan Singh
- Samantha Ruth Prabhu as an asylum patient (cameo appearance)

== Production ==
Nadunisi Naaygal shares its title with that of a poem by Sundara Ramaswamy. Director Gautham Vasudev Menon claimed that the film was inspired by a true event from the United States, adding that a novel helped form the story of the film. Explaining the relevance of the title, Menon said it was about "desire and the dangers that lurk in the night. I'm using dogs as a metaphor to denote danger". Veera, previously seen in minor or supporting roles, debuted as a lead actor with this film. To prepare for the role he trained with a Chennai-based psychiatrist, and learnt typical mannerisms and behavioural patterns shown by psychopaths. He even watched Moodu Pani (1980) in preparation for his role.

Ashwin Kakumanu initially auditioned for a role in Menon's Vinnaithaandi Varuvaayaa (2010). Menon was close to giving him the role, but Ashwin was noticed by the assistant directors of the film who recommended him for playing the love interest of Sameera Reddy's character in Nadunisi Naaygal, which became his acting debut. Swapna Abraham was cast as Menon wanted an actress who had a youthful appearance contrary to her age. Since her character is scarred, her makeup would take four hours to apply and three to remove. Avishek Karthik, credited as Deva, worked out and built his body to portray a police officer convincingly. The cinematography was handled by Manoj Paramahamsa, art direction by Rajeevan and editing by Anthony. Filming ended by September 2010 in Chennai. Most of the film was shot at night. Unlike most Tamil films, Nadunisi Naaygal does not feature any songs or score, but sounds designed by Renganaath Ravee.

== Release ==
Nadunisi Naaygal was released on 18 February 2011, after initially being scheduled for 11 February. It received an A certificate (adults only) from the censor board with no cuts. The film was also dubbed in Telugu as Erra Gulabilu, with Karthik's link to actress Sridevi garnering the film further attention from the media.

== Reception ==
Nadunisi Naaygal received mixed reviews from critics. Sify rated the film "above average", saying, "Don't go expecting a typical Gautham romantic film laced with peppy songs, be prepared to try out something new and experimental." The critic added that the film "is definitely not for the family audiences", while criticising that "there are too many loopholes in the story, raising doubts about logic". IANS gave the film 2.5 out of 5, describing it as an "unimpressive show by star director Menon, as it is neither convincing nor appealing, despite having some engrossing moments". Pavithra Srinivasan of Rediff.com too gave the film 2.5 out of 5, saying it "has a serious premise and is pretty realistic. But if you've watched any kind of Hollywood thriller at all, then the appeal is lost".

N. Venkateswaran of The Times of India wrote, "in his earlier movies [...] Gautham Menon had pushed the envelope when it came to presentation and themes, but in Nadunisi Naaygal he takes it a bit too far. Best, let the sleeping dogs lie", giving it 2 out of 5. Gautaman Bhaskaran of Hindustan Times wrote, "It is sad that Nadunisi Naaygal with a storyline powerful enough to deeply disturb a viewer (the horror gets into your bones) and with characters so finely fleshed out totters because of a shoddily penned script". The New Indian Express wrote, "The film begins promisingly and maintains an interesting pace in the earlier scenes and the key strength is Manoj Paramahamsa's cinematography [...] On the flip side, it's a predictable scenario, as the twists and turns go on the expected lines. Most importantly, it misses out the fear and thrill quotients, so essential to a movie of this genre". R. S. Prakash of Bangalore Mirror gave the film a negative review, but praised the audiography, cinematography and editing.

== Controversies ==
The film became controversial for an intimate scene between Veera and Swapna Abraham. Protests were staged in front of Menon's residence, who clarified that the scene is shown in an aesthetic manner and it is a sensitive story about a psychopath. When asked whether the scene would be removed from the film, Menon said the film itself would be removed soon from theatres as it was not doing performing well at the box office.

== See also ==
- List of Indian films without songs
