= Veera (actor) =

Indian actor

- Born: 26 July 1983 (age 43); Chennai, Tamil Nadu, India
- Other name: Veerabahu
- Occupation: Actor
- Years active: 2008 – present

Veera (born as Veerabahu) is an Indian actor who has appeared in Tamil language films. Closely associated with director Gautham Vasudev Menon, Veera has worked previously as Menon's assistant in the film Vaaranam Aayiram, before making his debut in the director's experimental thriller Nadunisi Naaygal (2011).

== Career ==
Veera joined Gautham Menon's directorial team in 2006 and worked with him during the production of Vettaiyaadu Vilaiyaadu (2006) and Pachaikili Muthucharam (2007), before being announced as one of the four new male leads in a film titled Chennaiyil Oru Mazhaikaalam to be directed by Menon. The film, set in the backdrop of Chennai's booming IT industry, began its shoot in mid 2007 with Trisha Krishnan leading an ensemble cast but was later delayed and then eventually shelved. Veera then continued his work with Menon as an assistant director, and featured in a small role of an army commando in the Suriya-starrer Vaaranam Aayiram (2008). Veera made his debut as a lead actor with Menon's psychological thriller Nadunisi Naaygal, in which he played a psychopath murderer. He revealed in order to prepare for the role he trained with a Chennai-based psychiatrist, Rangarajan, and learnt typical mannerisms and behavioural patterns shown by psychopaths. The film, which had been long in production, opened to mixed reviews in February 2011 from critics and did not perform well commercially. However Veera won rave reviews for his portrayal, with a critic from Sify.com noting "for a first timer, Veera as the psychopath with split personality makes a lasting impression in a well-written role" and that "he is riveting and holds the film together with his performance". Similarly another reviewer from Times of India stated "Veera has tremendous screen presence and fulfils the faith reposed in him by the director", and his performance saw him garner a nomination for at the Vijay Awards in 2011 for Best Debut Actor.

After the release of the film, Veera was signed by director Ram for a film Adangaamai, but the venture was eventually shelved after pre-production. In 2015, he starred in an action thriller titled Rajathandhiram which featured him alongside Regina Cassandra.

In 2023, Veera was signed by director H. Vinoth to act in the film Thunivu alongside Ajith Kumar. Veera plays a supporting role of a gangster who plans to rob a bank. Later that year, he acted in the film Lucky Man alongside Yogi Babu.

== Filmography ==
- All films are in Tamil, unless otherwise noted.

Year	Film	Role	Notes
2007	Pachaikili Muthucharam	Bus Passenger	Uncredited role
2008	Vaaranam Aayiram	Commando	
2011	Nadunisi Naaygal	Veera/Samar	Nominated, Vijay Award for Best Debut Actor
2015	Rajathanthiram	Arjun Parthiban	
2023	Thunivu	Radha	
2023	Lucky Man	Sivakumar	
