= Benny Dayal =

Indian singer (born 1979)

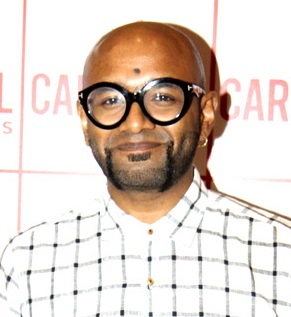

Background information
- Born: 13 May 1979 (age 47); Abu Dhabi, United Arab Emirates
- Genres: Pop; indi-pop
- Occupations: Singer; songwriter; Judge
- Instrument: Vocals
- Years active: 2002–present

Benny Dayal (born 13 May 1979) is an Indian playback singer based in the United Arab Emirates. He is a prominent singer in Hindi, Tamil, Telugu, Malayalam, Kannada, Bengali, Gujarati and Marathi and more languages films.

He is a member of the band S5, launched by SS Music TV channel. He made his acting debut in the Malayalam movie By the People, a suspense thriller. All the songs were sung by S5 members and it was then that A.R. Rahman noticed him and took an audition.

== Personal life ==
Dayal's parents hail from Kollam district in Kerala. He was born and raised in Abu Dhabi, UAE. After his schooling in the UAE he went on to complete his B.Com. and Masters in Journalism from Madras Christian College.

Dayal worked as an Events Coordinator with RR Donnelley. He quit his job in BPO to accomplish his career in music. On 5 June 2016, the singer married his model girlfriend Catherine Thangam in a close-knit ceremony in Bengaluru.

Dayal performs live with his touring band Funktuation, which features a brass section known as The Horn Flakes. Funktuation was formed in 2011 and has released the album Funk Katcheri.

== Discography ==
=== Albums ===
- Isai
- Ithu Premamo
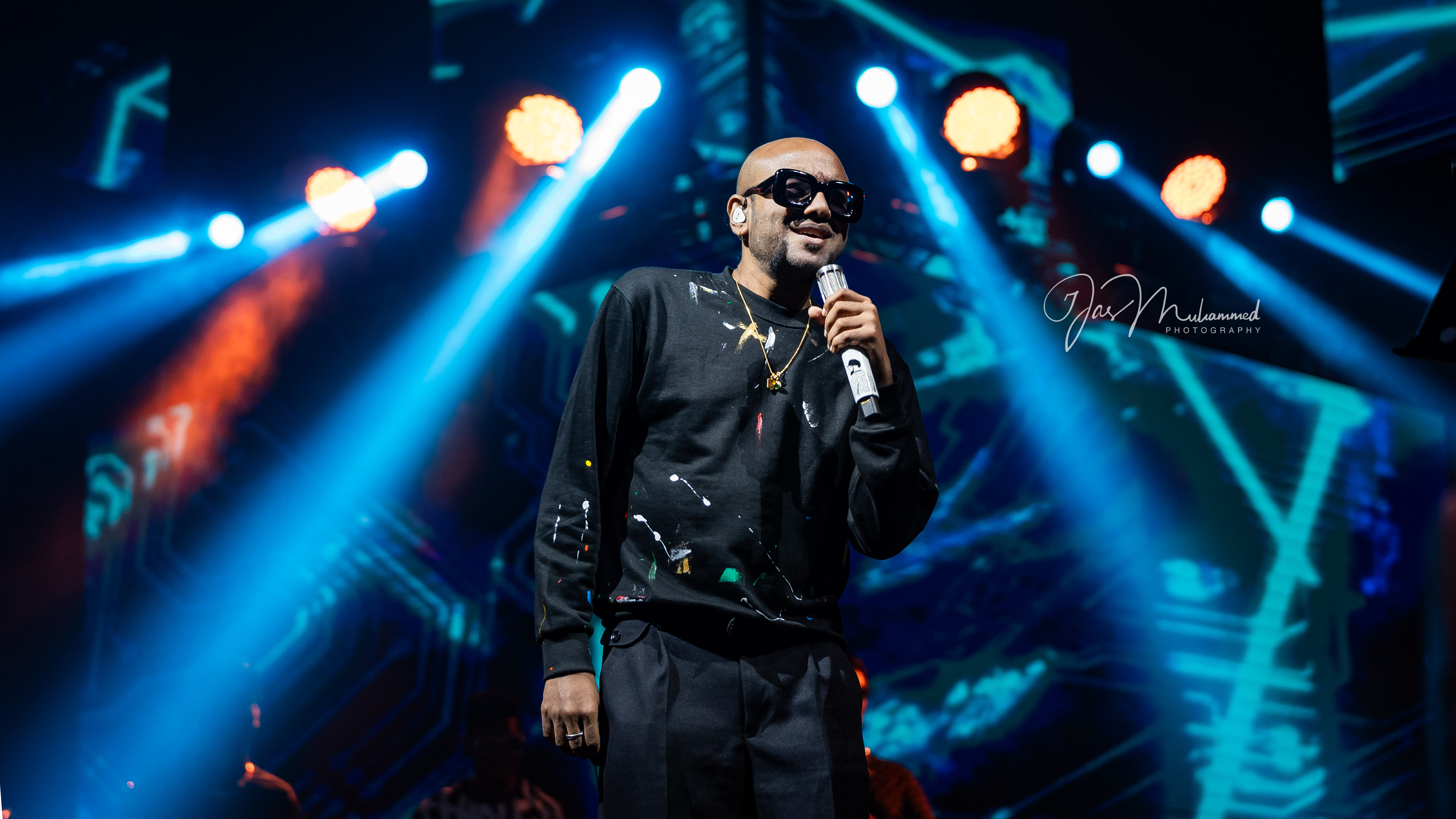
- Dayal performing in Doha in Feb 2024
  Ithu Premamo 2
- Saaral (produced by Rainbow Bridge Studios)
- Swaasam (produced by Hexachord)
- Vazhkai DJ (Produced by Benny Dayal and Charles Bosco)

=== Hindi songs ===
Year	Film	Song	Composer(s)	Writer(s)	Co-singer(s)	Ref.
2007	Fool N Final	"Masti (Remix)"	Himesh Reshammiya	Sameer, Irshad Kamil, Shehzad Roy, Nitin Raikwar	MG Sreekumar	
2008	Jaane Tu... Ya Jaane Na	"Pappu Can't Dance"	A. R. Rahman	Abbas Tyrewala	Annupamaa, Blaaze, Tanvi, Darshana, Satish Subrahmaniam, Mohammed Aslam	
2008	Jaane Tu... Ya Jaane Na	"Nazrein Milana Nazrein Churana"	A. R. Rahman	Abbas Tyrewala	Satish Subrahmaniam, Naresh Iyer, Darshana, Swetha, Tanvi, Sayonora Philip, Bhargavi, Anupama	
2008	Golmaal Returns	"Vacancy"	Pritam	Sameer	Neeraj Shridhar, Suhail Kaul, Suzanne D'Mello	
2008	Yuvvraaj	"Tu Hi Toh Meri Dost Hai"	A. R. Rahman	Gulzar	Shreya Ghoshal, A. R. Rahman	
2008	Yuvvraaj	"Mastam Mastam"	A. R. Rahman	Gulzar	Sonu Nigam, Alka Yagnik, Naresh Iyer	
2008	Yuvvraaj	"Dil Ka Rishta"	A. R. Rahman	Gulzar	Sonu Nigam, Roop Kumar Rathod, A. R. Rahman, Clinton Cerejo, Suzanne, Vivienne Pocha, Sunaina, Naresh Iyer, Blaaze	
2008	Ghajini	"Kaise Mujhe"	A. R. Rahman	Prasoon Joshi	Shreya Ghoshal	
2009	Delhi-6	"Dilli-6"	A. R. Rahman	Prasoon Joshi	Blaaze, Tanvi Shah, Vivian Chaix, Claire	
2009	Delhi-6	"Rehna Tu"	A. R. Rahman	Prasoon Joshi	A. R. Rahman, Tanvi Shah	
2009	Rocket Singh: Salesman of the Year	"Pocket Mein Rocket Hai"	Salim–Sulaiman	Jaideep Sahni		
2009	Blue	"Aaj Dil Gustakh Hai"	A. R. Rahman	Mayur Puri	Sukhwinder Singh, Shreya Ghoshal, Shi Millhouse, Henry Kuruvilla, Raven Millhouse	
2010	Badmaash Company	"Badmaash Company" (Title Song)	Pritam	Anvita Dutt Guptan		
2010	Band Baaja Baaraat	"Tarkeebein"	Salim–Sulaiman	Amitabh Bhattacharya	Salim Merchant	
2010	Band Baaja Baaraat	"Dum Dum"	Salim–Sulaiman	Amitabh Bhattacharya	Himani Kapoor	
2010	Pyaar Impossible	"You and Me"	Salim–Sulaiman	Anvita Dutt Guptan	Neha Bhasin	
2010	Enthiran D	"Arima Arima"	A. R. Rahman	Swanand Kirkire	Hariharan, Sadhana Sargam, Naresh Iyer	
2011	Pyaar Ka Punchnama	"Life Sahi Hai"	Clinton Cerejo	Luv Ranjan	KK, Vishal Dadlani, Sid Coutto	
2011	Always Kabhi Kabhi	"Antenna"	Pritam	Amitabh Bhattacharya	Roshan Abbas, Apeksha Dandekar	
2011	Mere Brother Ki Dulhan	"Choomantar"	Sohail Sen	Irshad Kamil	Aditi Singh Sharma	
2011	Love Breakups Zindagi	"Love Love Love"	Salim–Sulaiman	Javed Akhtar	Shraddha Pandit	
2011	Aazaan	"Habibi Habibi"	Salim–Sulaiman	Shraddha Pandit	Mitika	
2011	Ladies vs Ricky Bahl	"Aadat Se Majboor"	Salim–Sulaiman	Amitabh Bhattacharya		
2012	Jodi Breakers	"Jab Main Tumhare Saath Hoon"	Salim–Sulaiman	Irshad Kamil	Shilpa Rao, Salim Merchant	
2012	Ek Main Aur Ekk Tu	"Ek Main Aur Ekk Tu" (Title Song)	Amit Trivedi	Amitabh Bhattacharya	Anushka Manchanda	
2012	Cocktail	"Daru Desi"	Pritam	Irshad Kamil	Shalmali Kholgade	
2012	OMG – Oh My God	"Don't Worry (Hey Ram)"	Himesh Reshammiya	Subrat Sinha	Himesh Reshammiya, Arya Acharya	
2012	Heroine	"Tujhpe Fida"	Salim–Sulaiman	Neelesh Mishra	Shraddha Pandit	
2012	Chakravyuh	"Chakravyuh- Theme"	Salim–Sulaiman			
2012	Student of the Year	"The Disco Song"	Vishal–Shekhar	Anvita Dutt Guptan	Sunidhi Chauhan	
2012	Vishwaroopam	"Jung Hai"	Shankar–Ehsaan–Loy	Javed Akhtar, Asif Ali Beg	Shankar Mahadevan	
2013	Race 2	"Lat Lag Gayi"	Pritam	Mayur Puri	Shalmali Kholgade	
2013	Yeh Jawaani Hai Deewani	"Badtameez Dil"	Pritam	Amitabh Bhattacharya	Shefali Alvares	
2013	Phata Poster Nikla Hero	"Hey Mr.Dj"	Pritam	Amitabh Bhattacharya	Shefali Alvares, Shalmali Kholgade	
2013	Rabba Main Kya Karoon	"Muh Meetha Kara De"	Salim-Sulaiman	Amitabh Bhattacharya	Monali Thakur	
2013	Rabba Main Kya Karoon	"Rabba Main Kya Karoon - Title Track"	Salim-Sulaiman	Amitabh Bhattacharya	Raj Pandit, Vidhi Sharma	
2013	Shuddh Desi Romance	"Shuddh Desi Romance" (Title Song)	Sachin–Jigar	Jaideep Sahni	Shalmali Kholgade	
2014	Yaariyan	"ABCD"	Pritam	Amitabh Bhattacharya	Shefali Alvares, Yo Yo Honey Singh	
2014	Bewakoofiyaan	"Gulcharrey"	Raghu Dixit	Anvita Dutt Guptan	Aditi Singh Sharma	
2014	Hasee Toh Phasee	"Punjabi Wedding Song"	Vishal–Shekhar	Amitabh Bhattacharya	Sunidhi Chauhan	
2014	Hasee Toh Phasee	"Shake It Like Shammi"	Vishal–Shekhar	Amitabh Bhattacharya		
2014	Main Tera Hero	"Besharmi Ki Height"	Sajid–Wajid	Kumaar	Shalmali Kholgade	
2014	2 States	"Locha-e-Ulfat"	Shankar–Ehsaan–Loy	Amitabh Bhattacharya		
2014	Holiday: A Soldier Is Never Off Duty	"Tu Hi To Hai"	Pritam	Irshad Kamil		
2014	Humpty Sharma Ki Dulhania	"Lucky Tu Lucky Me"	Sachin–Jigar	Shashank Khaitan	Anushka Manchanda	
2014	Samrat & Co.	"Samrat & Co - Title Track	GAP (Gopal-Anand-Pavan)	Gopal Dutt		
2014	Raja Natwarlal	"Kabhi Ruhani Kabhi Rumani"	Yuvan Shankar Raja	Irshad Kamil		
2014	Raja Natwarlal	"Flip Your Collar Back"	Yuvan Shankar Raja	Irshad Kamil		
2014	Creature 3D	"Hum Naa Rahe Hum"	Mithoon	Mithoon		
2014	Bang Bang!	"Bang Bang" (Title Song)	Vishal–Shekhar	Vishal Dadlani	Neeti Mohan	
2014	Bang Bang!	"Uff"	Vishal–Shekhar	Anvita Dutt Guptan	Harshdeep Kaur	
2015	ABCD 2	"Naach Meri Jaan"	Sachin–Jigar	Mayur Puri	Shalmali Kholgade, Siddharth Basrur, Rimi Nique	
2015	ABCD 2	"If You Hold My Hand"	Sachin–Jigar	Mayur Puri		
2015	Bangistan	"Saturday Night"	Ram Sampath	Puneet Krishna	Aditi Singh Sharma, Neeraj Shridhar, Janusz Krucinski	
2015	Dilwale	"Premika"	Pritam	Amitabh Bhattacharya	Kanika Kapoor, Jonita Gandhi	
2016	Mastizaade	"Kamina Hai Dil"	Meet Bros Anjjan	Kumaar		
2016	Kyaa Kool Hain Hum 3	"Kya Kool Hai Hum" (Title Song)	Sajid–Wajid	Danish Sabri	Shivranjani Singh	
2016	Kapoor and Sons	"Let's Nacho"	Nucleya, Benny Dayal	Kumaar, Christopher Pradeep	Badshah	
2016	Baaghi	"Get Ready To Fight"	Pranaay Rijia	Rahul B. Seth, Sabbir Khan	Siddharth Basrur	
2016	Traffic	"Keh Bhi De"	Mithoon	Turaz	Palak Muchhal	
2016	Te3n	"Rootha"	Clinton Cerejo	Amitabh Bhattacharya	Divya Kumar, Bianca Gomes	
2016	Befikre	"Ude Dil Befikre"	Vishal–Shekhar	Jaideep Sahni		
2017	A Gentleman	"Disco Disco"	Sachin–Jigar	Vayu Srivastav	Shirley Setia	
2017	Bhoomi	"Trippy Trippy"	Sachin–Jigar	Priya Sariya, Badshah	Neha Kakkar, Brijesh Shandilya, Badshah	
2018	Love Per Square Foot	"Chicken Dance"	Sohail Sen	Anand Tiwari	Shivangi Bhayana	
2018	Hichki	"Madamji Go Easy"	Jasleen Royal	Raj Shekhar, David Klyton	David Klyton	
2018	Lashtam Pashtam D	"Lashtam Pashtam" (Title Song)	Sana	Mehboob	KK	
2018	Lashtam Pashtam D	"Kyon Na Ho"	Sana	Mehboob	Shalmali Kholgade	
2019	Mard Ko Dard Nahi Hota	"Rappan Rappi Rap"	Karan Kulkarni, Dipanjan Guha	Garima Obrah		
2019	Arjun Patiala	"Crazy Habibi VS Decent Munda"	Sachin–Jigar	Guru Randhawa		
2019	Mission Mangal	"Dil Mein Mars Hain"	Amit Trivedi	Amitabh Bhattacharya	Vibha Saraf	
2019	The Zoya Factor	"Pepsi Ki Kasam"	Shankar–Ehsaan–Loy	Amitabh Bhattacharya		
2019	War	"Jai Jai Shivshankar"	Vishal–Shekhar	Kumaar	Vishal Dadlani	
2019	Made in China	"Sanedo"	Sachin–Jigar	Niren Bhatt, Jigar Saraiya	Mika Singh, Nikhita Gandhi	
2020	Ala Vaikunthapurramuloo D	"Butta Bomma"	S. Thaman	Rajesh Manthan		
2020	Shakuntala Devi	"Jhilmil Piya"	Sachin–Jigar	Priya Saraiya	Monali Thakur	
2020	Indoo Ki Jawani	"Dil Tera"	Rochak Kohli	Gurpreet Saini, Gautam G Sharma	Neeti Mohan	
2021	83	"Bigadne De"	Pritam	Amitabh Bhattacharya		
2021	Tuesdays and Fridays	"Funky Mohabbat"	Tony Kakkar	Kumaar	Sonu Kakkar, Shreya Ghoshal	
2022	RRR D	"Sholay"	M. M. Keeravani	Riya Mukherjee	Vishal Mishra, Sahithi Chaganti, Harika Narayan	
2022	Atithi Bhooto Bhava	"Raat Kawari Hai"	Prasad S	Mayur Puri		
2022	Salaam Venky	"Anda Bata Paratha"	Mithoon	Sandeep Shrivastava	Aditi Singh Sharma, Mithoon	
2023	Ganapath	"Sara Zamana"	White Noise Studios	Priya Saraiya	Prakriti Kakkar	
2024	Fighter	"Sher Khul Gaye"	Vishal-Shekhar	Kumaar	Vishal Dadlani, Shekhar Ravjiani, Shilpa Rao	
2024	Madgaon Express	"Raaton Ke Nazaare"	Sharib-Toshi	Kalim Sheikh	Sharib-Toshi	

=== Tamil songs ===
Year	Film	Song	Composer(s)	Co-singer(s)
2005	London	"Adimithu Adi"	Vidyasagar	Kamaal Khan
2005	Ponniyin Selvan	"Do Re Me"	Vidyasagar	Kunal Ganjawala, Arjun
2007	Sivaji	"Balleilakka"	A. R. Rahman	S. P. Balasubrahmanyam, A. R. Reihana
2007	Polladhavan	"Neeye Sol"	G. V. Prakash Kumar	Sunitha Sarathy
2007	Sivi	"O Nenje"	Dharan	Dr. Burn, Dharan, Shweta Mohan
2007	Azhagiya Tamil Magan	"Nee Marilyn Monroe"	A. R. Rahman	Ujjayinee Roy
2007	Azhagiya Tamil Magan	"Maduraikku"	A. R. Rahman	Archith, Darshana KT
2008	Kaalai	"Kaala Kaala"	G. V. Prakash Kumar	Mamta Mohandas
2008	Kaalai	"Vandhutaanda Kaala"	G. V. Prakash Kumar	Rahul Nambiar, Silambarasan
2008	Dhaam Dhoom	"Pudhu Pudhu"	Harris Jayaraj	Suchitra, Guna
2008	Dhaam Dhoom	"Thikku Thikku"	Harris Jayaraj	Sayanora Philip
2008	Jayamkondaan	"Ore Or Naal"	Vidyasagar	
2008	Subramaniapuram	"Theneeril Snegitham"	James Vasanthan	
2008	Kuruvi	"Kuruvi Kuruvi"	Vidyasagar	Dr. Burn, Pravin Mani, Vetri Boys, SuVi
2008	Ananda Thandavam	"Kallil Aadum"	G. V. Prakash Kumar	Shweta Mohan
2008	Sakkarakatti	"Taxi Taxi"	A. R. Rahman	Blaaze, Viviane Chaix
2008	Sakkarakatti	"Chinnamma Chilakkamma"	A. R. Rahman	Chinmayi
2008	Mahesh, Saranya Matrum Palar	"Katrae Katrae"	Vidyasagar	
2008	Sathyam	"En Anbe"	Harris Jayaraj	Sadhana Sargam
2008	Vaaranam Aayiram	"Adiye Kolludhae"	Harris Jayaraj	Krish, Shruti Haasan
2008	Vaaranam Aayiram	"Yethi Yethi"	Harris Jayaraj	Naresh Iyer, Solar Sai
2008	Seval	"Odamarathu Mullapola"	G. V. Prakash Kumar	
2008	Pandi	"Kuthu Madhippa"	Srikanth Deva	Suchitra
2009	Ayan	"Oyaayiyae"	Harris Jayaraj	Haricharan, Chinmayi
2009	Pasanga	"Who's That Guy"	James Vasanthan	
2009	Solla Solla Inikkum	"Sagiye Sagiye"	Bharadwaj	
2009	Solla Solla Inikkum	"Rajathi Rajaillae"	Bharadwaj	
2009	Guru En Aalu	"Veesuvadhu"	Srikanth Deva	
2009	Muthirai	"Night Is Still Young"	Yuvan Shankar Raja	Krish
2009	Kulir 100°	"Boom"	BoBo Shashi	Abhishek Ray, BoBo Shashi
2009	Kulir 100°	"Siragindri Parakkalam"	BoBo Shashi	Geetha, Rekha, Saritha, Archana, Swami, Lil-J & Bobo Shashi
2009	Maasilamani	"Nacka Romba Nacka"	D. Imman	Rita
2009	Kanden Kadhalai	"Oru Naal Iravil"	Vidyasagar	Tippu
2009	Aadhavan	"Damakku Damakku"	Harris Jayaraj	
2009	Ninaithale Inikkum	"Nanbanai Partha"	Vijay Antony	
2009	Siddu +2	"Money Money"	Dharan	Reshmi
2009	Perumal	"Yaen Kedutha"	Srikanth Deva	Surmukhi Raman
2009	Laadam	"Makkah"	Dharan	Haricharan
2009	Laadam	"Gangster"	Dharan	Dr. Burn
2009	Manjal Veiyil	"College Vazhkayila"	Bharadwaj	Jaya
2009	Sirithal Rasipen	"Kanadicha Rosapoo"	Iniyavan	Suchitra
2009	Palaivana Solai	"Happy New"	E. K. Bobby	
2009	Saa Boo Thiri	"Suvai Karumbe"	Abbas Rafi	Ujjayinee Roy
2009	Saa Boo Thiri	"Saa Boo Thiri"	Abbas Rafi	
2009	Naan Avanillai 2	"Manmadha Leelai"	D. Imman	Shail Hada, Nithyasree
2009	Kandhakottai	"Kaadhal Paambu"	Dhina	Sowmya Raoh, Dev Prakash
2009	Paiyaa	"Poongatre Poongatre"	Yuvan Shankar Raja	
2010	Goa	"Idaivezhi Oru"	Yuvan Shankar Raja	Mamta Mohandas
2010	Vinnaithaandi Varuvaayaa	"Omana Penne"	A. R. Rahman	Kalyani Menon
2010	Yathumaagi	"Pesum Minsaram"	James Vasanthan	
2010	Yathumaagi	"Yathumaagi"	James Vasanthan	
2010	Aridhu Aridhu	"Kanavugal Edhuvarai"	S. Thaman	S. Thaman
2010	Angadi Theru	"Kadhaigalai Pesum"	G. V. Prakash Kumar	Hamsika Iyer
2010	Angadi Theru	"Yenge Poveno"	G. V. Prakash Kumar	MK Balaji, Janaki Iyer
2010	Don	"Sureanna"	Raghava Lawrence	
2010	Don	"Thadai Udaipaan"	Raghava Lawrence	
2010	Raavanan	"Kodu Poatta"	A. R. Rahman	A. R. Rahman
2010	Raavanan	"Keda Kari"	A. R. Rahman	Bamba Bakya, A. R. Reihana, Tanvi Shah
2010	Singam	"Naane Indhiran"	Devi Sri Prasad	Manikka Vinayagam
2010	Enthiran	"Arima Arima"	A. R. Rahman	Hariharan, Sadhana Sargam, Naresh Iyer
2010	Vaadaa	"Adi Yennadi Raakkamma"	D. Imman	
2010	Mynaa	"Neeyum Naanum"	D. Imman	Shreya Ghoshal
2010	Easan	"Meyyana Inbam"	James Vasanthan	Sukhwinder Singh, Sunandan
2010	Easan	"Get Ready"	James Vasanthan	Gerard Thompson
2010	Chikku Bukku	"Chikku Bukku"	Pravin Mani	Rahul Nambiar, Maya, Sricharan
2010	Chikku Bukku	"Zara Zara"	Pravin Mani	Lavanya
2010	Kaavalan	"Step Step"	Vidyasagar	Megha
2010	Veppam	"Minnala"	Joshua Sridhar	
2010	Thambikku Indha Ooru	"Ore Minsaram"	Dharan	
2010	Thambikku Indha Ooru	"Thambikku Indha Ooru"	Dharan	Mukesh Mohamed
2010	Kanagavel Kaaka	"Suthugira Bhoomi"	Vijay Antony	
2010	Kola Kolaya Mundhirika	"Ada Engengum"	V. Selvaganesh	Kalpana
2010	Magane En Marumagane	"Singampatti Oorula"	Dhina	Chinnaponnu
2010	Kadhalagi	"Roja Thottathil"	A. R. Reihana	Karthik, Prashanthini, A. R. Reihana
2010	Pa. Ra. Palanisamy	"Nenjukkul Mariyal"	Dhina	Priya Himesh
2010	Vizhiyil Vizhunthaval	"Paarthal Naan Charlie Chaplin"	Pollack	
2010	Vilai	"Arukkaani Arukkaani"	D. Imman	Priyadarshini
2011	Kadhal 2 Kalyanam	"Idhu Kadhalai"	Yuvan Shankar Raja	Chinmayi
2011	Vaanam	"Who Am I"	Yuvan Shankar Raja	
2011	Ambuli	"Happy Farewell Day"	Mervin Solomon	Pop Shalini, Reshmitha, Priyanka
2011	Subramaniam	"Solvanna"	Mani Sharma	Ranjith
2011	Venghai	"Dhenam Dhenam"	Devi Sri Prasad	Baba Sehgal
2011	7aam Arivu	"Oh Ringa Ringa"	Harris Jayaraj	Suchitra, Roshan, Jerry John
2011	Urumi	"Kondaadu Kondaadu"	Deepak Dev	Rita
2011	Margazhi 16	"Thirunelveli"	E. K. Bobby	
2011	Aivar	"Enga Veetu Nai"	Kavi Periyathambi	
2011	Mittai	"Aasaipadu"	Sabesh–Murali	
2011	Naan Sivanagiren	"Kadhalillai"	K. S. Manoj	Cisily
2011	Vithagan	"Gappu Aappu"	Joshua Sridhar	
2011	Vithagan	"Vegamaai"	Joshua Sridhar	Sunitha Sarathy
2011	Maharaja	"My Name Is Raju Baby"	D. Imman	Nassar, Sricharan
2012	Podaa Podi	"Podaa Podi"	Dharan	Andrea Jeremiah
2012	Podaa Podi	"Maatikittaenae"	Dharan	Naresh Iyer, Suchitra
2012	Marina	"Yelelo"	Girishh G	Sandhya, Andrea Jeremiah
2012	Leelai	"Ponmalai"	Satish Chakravarthy	
2012	Leelai	"Bubble Gum"	Satish Chakravarthy	Sunitha Sarathy, SuVi, Leon James
2012	Kumki	"Yella Oorum"	D. Imman	D. Imman
2012	Vishwaroopam	"Thuppaki Engal Tholile"	Shankar–Ehsaan–Loy	Kamal Haasan
2012	Marupadiyum Oru Kadhal	"May Madhaam"	Srikanth Deva	
2012	Medhai	"Uyirile Deepam Ondru"	Dhina	Saindhavi
2012	Naanga	"Romance Rowdy"	Bala Bharathi	
2012	Kantha	"Etturu Tarikaa"	Shakthi R. Selva	
2012	Suzhal	"Vaa Nanba Vaa"	L. V. Ganesh	Suvi Suresh
2012	Mirattal	"Whistle Poodu"	Pravin Mani	Suvi Suresh
2012	Mirattal	"Thillu Mullu"	Pravin Mani	Pravin Mani
2012	Eppadi Manasukkul Vanthai	"En Thottathu"	A. J. Daniel	Priya Himesh
2012	English Vinglish	"Dhikku Dhikku"	Amit Trivedi	
2012	English Vinglish	"Manhattan"	Amit Trivedi	Bianca Gomes
2012	English Vinglish	"English Vinglish" (male)	Amit Trivedi	
2013	Thalaivaa	"Tamil Pasanga"	G. V. Prakash Kumar	Sheezay. Psycho Unit
2013	Neram	"Evan Avan"	Rajesh Murugesan	
2013	JK Enum Nanbanin Vaazhkai	"Uyire Uyire"	G. V. Prakash Kumar	Ramya NSK
2013	Azhagan Azhagi	"Penne Penne"	Kannan	
2013	Thulli Vilayadu	"Vaa Machi Oothiko"	Srikanth Deva	
2014	Aaha Kalyanam	"Kootali Kootali"	Dharan	Usha Uthup
2014	Maan Karate	"Darling Dambakku"	Anirudh Ravichander	Sunidhi Chauhan
2014	Anjaan	"Oru Kan Jaadai"	Yuvan Shankar Raja	Shweta Pandit
2014	Sigaram Thodu	"Sigaram Thodu"	D. Imman	Snigdha Chandra, Santhosh Hariharan
2014	Ninaivil Nindraval	"Senthamizhe"	D. Imman	Shweta Mohan, Dinesh Kanagaratnam
2014	Yaamirukka Bayamey	"Ennamo Edho"	S. N. Prasad	Sunitha Sarathy
2015	Yennai Arindhaal...	"Unakkenna Venum Sollu"	Harris Jayaraj	Mahathi
2015	Vasuvum Saravananum Onna Padichavanga	"Adada Onnum Solladha"	D. Imman	Shakthisree Gopalan
2015	Naanum RowdyDhaan	"Naanum Rowdydhaan"	Anirudh Ravichander	
2015	Iruvar Ondranal	"Silu Silu"	Guru Krishnan	
2015	Yagavarayinum Naa Kaakka	"Papparapampam"	Prasan-Praveen-Shyam	Krishna Iyer, M. M. Manasi
2015	Masala Padam	"Abc Of Chennai"	Karthik Acharya	Subhi
2016	24	"Kaalam En Kadhali"	A. R. Rahman	Shashwat Singh, Abhay Jodhpurkar
2016	Aandavan Kattalai	"Vaazhkai Oru Ottagam"	K	
2016	Devi	"Chalmaar"	Sajid–Wajid	
2016	Maalai Nerathu Mayakkam	"Mokka Piece"	Amrit	
2017	Vanamagan	"Morada Morada"	Harris Jayaraj	Krish
2017	Saravanan Irukka Bayamaen	"Lala Kadai Santhi"	D. Imman	Sunidhi Chauhan
2017	Sathya	"Kadhal Project"	Simon K.King	Keerthana Vaidyanathan, Sharanya Gopinath, Yazin Nizar
2017	Sei	"Machaney Machaney"	NyX Lopez	
2017	Bairavaa	"Pattaya Kelappu"	Santhosh Narayanan	Ananthu
2017	Velaiilla Pattadhari 2	"Dooram Nillu"	Sean Roldan	Dhanush, Shakthisree Gopalan
2017	Karuppan	"Olaga Vaayaadi"	D. Imman	
2017	Nenjil Thunivirundhal	"Aei Arakka"	D. Imman	
2017	Brahma.com	"I Am CEO"	Siddharth Vipin	Nikhita Gandhi
2018	Abhiyum Anuvum	"Engada Pona"	Dharan	Nikhita Gandhi
2018	Abhiyum Anuvum	"Engada Pona" (male)	Dharan	
2018	Goli Soda 2	"Kannamma (Reprise)"	Achu Rajamani	
2018	Mohini	"Bomb Figure Baby"	Vivek–Mervin	Sanjana, Switche
2018	Ghajinikanth	"Hola Hola"	Balamurali Balu	M. M. Manasi, Christopher Stanley
2018	60 Vayadu Maaniram	"Thedi Thedi"	Ilaiyaraaja	Vibhavari
2018	60 Vayadu Maaniram	"Naalum Naalum" (II)	Ilaiyaraaja	Monali Thakur
2018	Saamy Square	"Darnakka"	Devi Sri Prasad	Anthony Daasan
2018	NOTA	"Yethikka Yethikka"	Sam C. S.	Sunitha Sarathy
2018	Kaatrin Mozhi	"Dirty Pondatti"	A. H. Kaashif	Swagatha S Krishnan
2019	Saaho	"Bad Boy"	Badshah	Sunitha Sarathy
2019	KD	"Tuckulingu"	Karthikeya Murthy	Andrea Jeremiah
2019	Ayogya	"Godu Godu"	Sam C. S.	Nivas
2019	Mr. Local	"Menaminiki"	Hiphop Tamizha	Snigdha Chandra
2019	House Owner	"Saayamal Saaigindra"	Ghibran	
2019	Jada	"Tarrake"	Sam C. S.	
2020	Kannum Kannum Kollaiyadithaal	"Sirikkalam Parakkalam"	Masala Coffee	Madurai Souljour
2020	Irandam Kuththu	"Virginity"	Dharan	Ramya NSK
2021	99 Songs	"Naalai Naalai"	A. R. Rahman	
2021	Pushpa: The Rise – Part 1	"Odu Odu Aadu"	Devi Sri Prasad	
2021	Maara	"Oh Azhage"	Ghibran	
2021	Theerpugal Virkapadum	"Yaarum Ingu"	S. N. Prasad	
2022	My Dear Bootham	"Master Oh My Master"	D. Imman	
2022	Anbarivu	"Kanavugal"	Hiphop Tamizha	Bamba Bakya, Sam Vishal, Srinisha Jayaseelan, Sridhar Sena, Maanasi K, Shilvi Sharon
2022	The Legend	"Vaadi Vaasal"	Harris Jayaraj	Jonita Gandhi
2022	RRR	"Koelae"	M. M. Keeravani	Vishal Mishra, Sahithi Chaganti, Harika Narayan
2022	Onai	"Kaduna Thrillu Thanada"	Sachin-Jigar	
2022	Yutha Satham	"Rock N Roll Rasaathi"	D. Imman	Joewin Shamalina
2022	Kuttram Kuttrame	"Maaman Magale"	Ajeesh	Pravin Saivi, Ajeesh
2022	Maha	"Kedutthutiye"	Ghibran	
2022	Kanam	"Thaalam Thattum"	Jakes Bejoy	
2022	Gatta Kusthi	"Chal Chakka"	Justin Prabhakaran	
2022	Varalaru Mukkiyam	"Pothi Pothi Valatha Pulla"	Shaan Rahman	
2023	Tiger 3	''Tiger Partyla Naam''	Pritam	Anusha Mani
2023	Ellaam Mela Irukuravan Paathuppan	"Super Hero"	Karthik Acharya	
2025	Padaiyaanda Maaveeraa	"Pulikodi"	G. V. Prakash Kumar	V. M. Mahalingam
2026	Blast	"Alpha"	Ravi Basrur	Rohith Siddappa

=== Telugu songs ===
Year	Film	Song	Composer(s)
2008	Jalsa	"Jennifer Lopez"	Devi Sri Prasad
2008	Ready	"Ayyo Ayyo Ayyo"	Devi Sri Prasad
2008	Ullasamga Utsahamga	"Chakkori Chakkori"	G. V. Prakash Kumar
2009	Current	"Current"	Devi Sri Prasad
2009	Village Lo Vinayakudu	"Superman"	Manikanth Kadri
2009	Josh	"Bad Boy"	Sandeep Chowta
2009	Blue	"Gundey Lo Nippundiley" - (Dubbed)	A. R. Rahman
2010	Namo Venkatesa	"Tottadoing"	Devi Sri Prasad
2010	Bindaas	"Girija Girija"	Bobo Shashi
2010	Ye Maaya Chesave	"Kundanapu Bomma"	A. R. Rahman
2010	Varudu	"Saare Jahaa"	Mani Sharma
2010	Darling	"Gum Gum Yeyo"	G. V. Prakash Kumar
2010	Vedam	"Now or Never"	M. M. Keeravani
2010	Orange	"Orange"	Harris Jayaraj
2011	Prema Kavali	"Dum Dum"	Anup Rubens
2011	Teen Maar	"Barbie Bommaki"	Mani Sharma
2011	Dhada	"Bhoome Gundranga"	Devi Sri Prasad
2011	Oh My Friend	"Vegam Vegam"	Rahul Raj
2011	Oh My Friend	"Nuvvu Nenu Jattu"	Rahul Raj
2011	Mogudu	"Bachelor Boys"	Babu Shankar
2012	Lovely	"Dolare Dola"	Anoop Rubens
2012	Poola Rangadu	"Poola Rangadu"	Anoop Rubens
2012	Daruvu	"Sexy Lady"	Vijay Antony
2012	Endukante... Premanta!	"Cinderella"	G. V. Prakash Kumar
2012	Rebel	"Keka Keka"	Raghava Lawrence
2012	Rebel	"Keka Keka"(Remix)	Raghava Lawrence
2012	English Vinglish (Dubbed version)	"English Vinglish"(Male)	Amit Trivedi
2012	English Vinglish (Dubbed version)	"Uliki Padenule"	Amit Trivedi
2012	English Vinglish (Dubbed version)	"Manhattan"	Amit Trivedi
2012	Genius	"Ambani Alludaina"	Joshua Sridhar
2012	Genius	"Chirigina Notu"	Joshua Sridhar
2013	Vishwaroopam	"Thupakee Thone"	Shankar–Ehsaan–Loy
2013	Chinni Chinni Aasha	"Idhigo Ila"	M Karthik
2013	Iddarammayilatho	"Run Run"	Devi Sri Prasad
2014	Aaha Kalyanam	"Savari Savari"	Dharan Kumar
2014	Bang Bang!	"Ivvaleyee Gaaluloo"	Vishal–Shekhar
2014	Bang Bang!	"Uff"	Vishal–Shekhar
2014	Bang Bang!	"Bang Bang"	Vishal–Shekhar
2015	Yentha Vaadu Gaani	"Neekem Kaavaalo"	Harris Jayaraj
2016	24	"Kaalam Na Preyasi"	A.R. Rahman
2016	Sardaar Gabbar Singh	"Sardaar Gabbar Singh"	Devi Sri Prasad
2017	Venkatapuram	"O Maya"	Achu
2017	C/o Surya	"Rudrakshaa"	D. Imman
2018	Touch Chesi Chudu	"Manasa"	KAG
2018	Next Enti	"Love Ostavam"	Leon James
2018	Anaganaga O Prema Katha	"Oka Tholi Prema"	KC Anjan
2018	Antariksham 9000 KMPH	"Dheemaga"	Prashanth R Vihari
2019	Dev	"Rey Bava Dev"	Harris Jayaraj
2019	Maharshi	"Phir Shuru"	Devi Sri Prasad
2019	ABCD: American Born Confused Desi	"America Naa America"	Judah Sandy
2019	Arjun Suravaram	"Thikamaka Makatika"	Sam C. S.
2020	World Famous Lover	"Comosava Paris"	Gopi Sundar
2021	Paagal	"Ee Single Chinnode"	Radhan
2022	Bhediya (Dubbed version)	''Adavullo Chichu Regeraa''	Sachin-Jigar
2023	Tiger 3 (Dubbed version)	''Yegire Manasey''	Pritam
2024	Siddharth Roy	"Nuvvevaro Mari"	Radhan
2025	Jack	"Pablo Neruda"	Achu Rajamani
2026	Raakaasa	"Snake Dance"	Anudeep Dev

=== Malayalam songs ===
Year	Film	Song	Composer(s)	Writer(s)	Co-singer(s)	Ref.
2005	By the People	"Asthala Vista"	Pravin Mani			
2005	By the People	"Malare"	Pravin Mani			
2005	By the People	"Vasco da Gama"	Pravin Mani			
2005	By the People	"Rock Me"	Pravin Mani			
2006	Kilukkam Kilukilukkam	"Paatonnu Paadan Marannathende"	Deepak Dev	Bichu Thirumala, Gireesh Puthenchery	Ranjith Govind, Arjun Sasi, Smitha	
2009	Robin Hood	"Parannu Vanna Paingili"	M. Jayachandran			
2010	Apoorvaragam	"Noolilla Pattangal"	Vidyasagar	Santhosh Varma	Devanand, Ranjith Govind, Naveen Anand, Cicily, Suchithra	
2010	Kaaryasthan	"Mangalangal"	Berny–Ignatius	Kaithapram Damodaran Namboothiri		
2011	Seniors	"Aaramam Niranje"	Alphons Joseph	Anil Panachooran	Lakshmi	
2011	Teja Bhai & Family	"Punjirikku"	Deepak Dev			
2015	KL 10 Patthu	"Halakinte avilumkanji"	Bijibal			
2018	Queen	"Saare Njangalingana"	Jakes Bejoy	Joe Paul	Jakes Bejoy, Ziya Ul Haque, Kavitha Gopi, Zonobia Safar	
2018	My Story	"Pathungi Pathungi"	Shaan Rahman	B. K. Harinarayanan	Manjari	
2018	Koode	"Paranne"	Raghu Dixit	Rafeeq Ahamed		
2019	Sakalakalashala	"Illatha Kashinu"	Aby Tom Cyriac			
2019	Queen Of Neermathalam Poothakalam	"Kalathin Mayajala"	Nahoom Abraham	S.Chandra		
2019	Saaho (D)	"Bad Boy"	Badshah	Vinayak Sasikumar	Sunitha Sarathy	
2019	Finals	"Chalaname"	Kailas Menon	Manu Manjith		
2019	Valiyaperunnal	"Uyirullavarum Sakalorkkum"	Rex Vijayan, Street Academics	Dimal Dennis, Thasreeq Abdul Salam		
2022	Thallumaala	"Ole Melody"	Vishnu Vijay	Muhsin Parari	Haricharan, Salim Kumar, Vishnu Vijay	
2022	Brahmāstra: Part One - Shiva	"Piri Ilaki Aadi"	Pritam	Shabareesh Varma		
2023	Kasargold	"Alaye"	Vishnu Vijay	Mu.Ri	Vishnu Vijay	
2023	Otta	"Peyneer Poley"	M. Jayachandran	Rafeeq Ahamed	P. Jayachandran	
2023	Otta	"Paral"	M. Jayachandran	Rafeeq Ahamed	Unni Elayaraja, M. Jayachandran	
2025	Lokah Chapter 1: Chandra	"Shoka Mookam"	Jakes Bejoy	Vinayak Sasikumar	Pranavam Sasi, J'mymah	

=== Kannada songs ===
Year	Film	Song	Composer(s)	Writer(s)	Co-singer(s)	Ref.
2008	Mast Maja Maadi	"Shakalaka Boom"	P.B Balaji	Ram Narayan	Janaki Iyer	
2008	Mast Maja Maadi	"Jhana Jhana Kanchana"	P.B Balaji	Ram Narayan	Krish, SuVi, P.B Balaji	
2009	Ullasa Utsaha	"Chakkori Chakkori"	G. V. Prakash Kumar	Kaviraj	Tippu, Rita	
2009	Love Guru	"Romeogalige juliet"	Joshua Sridhar	Joshua Sridhar	Blaaze	
2009	Love Guru	"Minchi Hoithu"	Joshua Sridhar	Vijayshankar		
2009	Love Guru	"Thangaali Thandeya"	Joshua Sridhar	Vijayshankar		
2009	Love Guru	"Yaaru Kooda"	Joshua Sridhar	Vijayshankar	Karthik	
2010	Prithvi	"Hejjegondu Hejje"	Manikanth Kadri	Kaviraj	Shweta Mohan, Clinton Cerejo	
2010	Prithvi	"Jagave Ninadu"	Manikanth Kadri	K. Kalyan	Manikanth Kadri	
2010	Gaana Bajaana	"Gundetu Gundetu"	Joshua Sridhar		Chinmayi	
2010	Huduga Hudugi	"Illeana"	Joshua Sridhar	Kaviraj	Krissy, Rita	
2016	Mungaru Male 2	"My Daddy is My Hero"	Arjun Janya	Chandan Shetty	Chandan Shetty	
2021	Ninna Sanihake	"Olavaagidhe"	Raghu Dixit	Vasuki Vaibhav	Aishwarya Rangarajan	

=== Bengali songs ===
Year	Film	Song	Composer(s)	Writer(s)	Co-singer(s)	Ref.
2013	Rangbaaz	"O Madhu I Love You"	Jeet Gannguli	Raja Chanda	Monali Thakur	
2013	Rangbaaz	Korisna Rangbazi	Jeet Gannguli	Prasen	Neeti Mohan	
2014	Game: He Plays To Win	"Party All Night"	Jeet Gannguli	Jalsha Movies Production	Neeti Mohan	
2014	Bachchan	"Bachchan Bachchan (Title Track)"	Jeet Gannguli	Raja Chanda		
2015	Herogiri	"Maria"	Jeet Gannguli	Raja Chanda	Shalmali Kholgade	
2015	Herogiri	"Janemon"	Jeet Gannguli	Raja Chanda	Deepali Sathe	
2015	Agnee 2	"Akk Khan Chumu"	Akassh	Priyo Chatterjee		
2015	Parbona Ami Chartey Tokey	"O Lolona"	Indradeep Dasgupta	Prasen (Prasenjit Mukherjee)	Satrujit Dasgupta	
2016	Beparoyaa	"Piya Basanti"	Indra, Kutty	Dipankar	Akriti Kakkar	
2017	Jio Pagla	"Jio Pagla (Title Track)"	Jeet Gannguli	Prasenjit Mallick	Monali Thakur	

=== Gujarati songs ===
Year	Film	Song	Composer(s)	Writer(s)	Co-singer(s)	Ref.
2017	Chor Bani Thangaat Kare	"Mauj-E-Dariya"	Sachin–Jigar	Niren Bhatt		

=== Marathi songs ===
Year	Film	Song	Composer(s)	Writer(s)	Co-singer(s)	Ref.
2019	Highway	"Kangaroo"	Reva	Ashwin		

=== Urdu songs ===
Year	Film	Song	Composer(s)	Writer(s)	Co-singer(s)	Ref.
2016	Bachaana	"Bachaana"	Ali Sher	Shakeel Sohail	Komal Ghazanfar	

== Filmography ==
Year	Title	Role	Language	Notes
2005	By The People	Himself	Malayalam	Cameo appearance in the songs "Rock Me" and "Oh Laila Oh Majnu"

== Awards and honors ==
Won

- 54th Filmfare Awards – RD Burman Award for New Music Talent – "Kaise Mujhe" for (Ghajini)
- 2009 Stardust Awards — Max Stardust Awards for New Musical Sensation – "Pappu Can't Dance" for (Jaane Tu Ya Jaane Na)
- Ananda vikadan cinema awards – Best playback singer – Male

== Live performances ==
- At Effe'25, IIIT Allahabad, on 31 March 2026
- At Srijan 2026, IIT(ISM) Dhanbad, on 8 February 2026
- At QNCC, Doha, Qatar on 29 February 2024
- At AVENOIR 2023, DR. MOPPENS MEDICAL COLLEGE, Wayanadu, Kerala on 17 December 2023
- At ATMOS 2023, BITS Pilani, Hyderabad Campus, on 5 November 2023
- At BOSM 2023, BITS Pilani, Pilani Campus, on 25 September 2023
- At Aura 2023, KLS GIT Belagavi, on 18 March 2023
- At Vibrance 2023, VIT Chennai, on 3 March 2023
- At Youthopia’22, The Heritage School Kolkata, on 30 July 2022
- At IIT jodhpur, on 23 February 2020
- At Riviera 2020, VIT Vellore, on 13 February 2020
- At ECHOES 2020, IIM Kozhikode, on 8 February 2020
- At Standard Chartered T&I, Annual Staff Day 2019 December, MGM beach Resorts, Chennai.
- At Imperium 2019, Management Development Institute, Gurgaon
- At Festember 2019, National Institute of technology, Tiruchirapalli
- At Shivaji College (vibration '19), New Delhi on 21 February 2019
- Ranchi Gymkhana club, Ranchi, 20 January 2019
- At Biocon Bangalore (Invivo 40), Bengaluru on 18 February 2019
- At IIM Bangalore (Unmaad – Cultural Fest), Bengaluru on 2 February 2019
- At Madras Christian College, Chennai on 24 January 2019.
- At Bacardi NH7 Weekender, Pune on 7 December 2018.
- Redbull Music festival, Kochi, 24 November 2018
- At Thapar University, Patiala on 19 November 2018.
- At Manpho Convention Center, Bangalore (AT&T Family Day "Odessey 2020") on 18 November 2018
- The Institute of Chartered Accountants of India, Abu Dhabi Chapter, 16 November 2018
- AIIMS Raipur on 28 October 2018
- At Mountain View, California (Gaana Music Festival) on 19 May 2018.
- At Vijayawada (K L University)Samyak 2018 on 24 March 2018.
- Crossroads 2018, Annual Cultural festival of Shri Ram College of Commerce, Delhi, on 18 March 2018.
- NITK Surathkal on 3 March 2018 as part of the cultural festival Incident 2018 (Day 3, Pro Shows)
- At Goa (Royal Enfield Raider Maniya)Live in concert on 19 November 2017.
- Manipal Institute of Technology on 11 March 2017 as part of Revels, the annual cultural festival of MIT.
- At IIT Hyderabad (ELAN- NVISION) Live in Concert on 21 January 2017
- 2017– at world orange festival, Nagpur Maharashtra ... Nikhil.k
- Sri Jayachamarajendra College of Engineering, Mysuru at its annual cultural fest (Jayciana – 2016) on 22 April 2016
- Anaadyanta at the Nitte Meenakshi Institute of Technology, Bangalore on 5 March 2016
- At PBWA Powai Sarvajanin Durgotsav—Live in Concert on 21 October 2015
- Spirit of Wipro Run 2015 – Wipro Limited, Bangalore on 20 September 2015
- Zee London Mela – London, England on 6 September 2015
- In "Spandan'2015" conducted by JIPMER, Pondicherry on 2 September 2015
- Canadian National Exhibition (CNE), Toronto, Canada on 23 August 2015
- Amrita School of Engineering, Coimbatore for Anokha '15 (Amrita's annual technical festival) on 7 March 2015
- Tech Mahindra Hyderabad annual fest Ekatvam in January 2015
- Infosys Limited, Bangalore, Indian Institute of Engineering Science and Technology, Shibpur for Rebeca '14 on 27 April 2014
- JSS Academy of Technical Education, Bangalore at its annual Techno-Cultural Fest (VERVE – 2014) on 26 April 2014
- Symbiosis Center for Management Studies at its annual Sympulse, in Pune, on 15 January 2014
- Annual Cultural Festival OASIS 2014 of Birla Institute of Technology & Science, Pilani
- Indian Institute of Foreign Trade in Delhi on 16 November 2013 at its annual management festival, Quo Vadis
- Zephyr 2013, the annual cultural festival of Orissa Engineering College in Bhubaneswar
- 2013 – Annual Cultural Fest, Siliguri Institute of Technology, Siliguri, West Bengal.
- Tezpur University at Techxetra on 27 October 2013
- NIT Trichy on 29 September 2013
- Institute of Medical Sciences, Banaras Hindu University (IMS, BHU, Varanasi)~ ELIXIR cultural event on 13 March 2013
- 8th mile, RV college of engineering on 20 September 2011.Bangalore
- Acharya Habba at the Acharya Institute of Technology, Bangalore on 9 April 2011
- Mar Baselios College of Engineering and Technology on 21 March 2010 as part of a cultural event
- SSN College of Engineering on 5 March 2010, with Stephen Devassy and others
- Shanmugha Arts, Science, Technology & Research Academy, Tanjore as a part of the cult fest Kuruksastra in 2009
- NIT Calicut on 26 March 2009 as part of the cultural festival Ragam '09
