= Sivaji: The Boss (soundtrack) =

- Soundtrack album cover

Soundtrack album by A. R. Rahman
- Released: 5 April 2007
- Recorded: Panchathan Record Inn and A.M. Studios, Chennai; KM Musiq Studios, London; Phase One Studios, Toronto
- Genre: Feature film soundtrack
- Length: 36:10
- Labels: Sony Music India; AVM Productions
- Producer: A. R. Rahman

A. R. Rahman chronology
| Bombil and Beatrice (2007) | Sivaji: The Boss (2007) | Amar the Pandu (2007) |

Sivaji: The Boss is the soundtrack album composed by A. R. Rahman for the film of the same name directed by S. Shankar, starring Rajinikanth and Shriya Saran and produced by AVM Productions.

== Album information ==
=== Unofficial version ===
As Sivaji became a major anticipated project, several false rumours about the soundtrack of the film were disseminated to websites and magazines. Despite the fact that early on during the project, Vairamuthu confirmed he had written a song called "Vaa..ji Vaa..ji Sivaji", no other major details about any other song was mentioned. Rumours went around that certain singers had sung in the project, including Rajinikanth. However, on 11 October 2006, the source, Behindwoods.com, mentioned that they had received credible information that Sivaji contained seven songs, five of which were set to be in the audio, with the other two being situational songs. Surprisingly, they also mentioned the five songs which were in the album.

"Vaa...ji Vaa...ji Sivaji" was mentioned to be the opening song of the film. They also reported that a philosophical song titled "Unpeyar Ennada" was in the film, as per usual Rajinikanth films since Baba. Another song titled "Jee Boom Ba" was mentioned as its picturization was to be filmed in either foreign locations or in Karnataka featuring the lead pair. A song called "Talla Dimi Takka Dimi Pucha" was apparently supposed to contain Japanese lyrics and was set to be filmed in Japan, however the Sivaji crew did not travel to Japan for any purposes during the shoot. The final song mentioned was "Adaal Udan Pesadha Di... En Salangaiku Bhadil Solladi" and it was mentioned as a remix from another film titled Vanjikottai Valiban. Behindwoods.com claimed that this song was set to come in the climax. However, none of these possible songs, barring "Vaaji Vaaji", were in the final album.

=== Official version ===
The first song in the album is "Balleilakka," which features Rajinikanth dancing with Nayanthara, who makes a guest appearance in the film. It picturizes him dancing and singing while returning to Tamil Nadu from the United States of America, with a backdrop of paddy fields. Over four hundred dancing extras were used in the song, including Pulikali artistes from Kerala. The song's lyrics were penned by Na. Muthukumar and the song was sung by S. P. Balasubrahmanyam. The other singers are Rahman's elder sister A. R. Reihana and Benny Dayal. Ethan Sperry of Portland State University arranged "Balleilakka" for SATB chorus and percussion (shaker, tambourine, djembe, and floor tom). The arrangement was published by earthsongs in 2010 as part of its "Global Rhythms" series. It has since been performed around the world, including by choirs at Saint Joseph University of Beirut, Stellenbosch University, Luther College, and many youth choirs.

The second song in the album is entitled "Style" and is sung by Ravi "Rags" Khote, Tanvi, Blaaze and Suresh Peters. The song was previously titled "Oru Koodai Sunlight" and was picturized in Bilbao, Spain. The song praises Rajinikanth's style and hero qualities. The lyrics were penned by Pa. Vijay.

The third song is "Vaaji Vaaji" and was picturized at Hyderabad's Ramoji Film City, with sets at a cost of three Indian Crores. Reports claim the song picturizes Rajinikanth in knee-length warrior clothing as the King of Egypt and Shriya Saran as Queen. The song, penned by Vairamuthu, has singers Hariharan and Madhushree singing.

The fourth song in the album is "Athiradee" and is sung by A. R. Rahman and Sayonara, with lyrics written by Vaali.

The fifth and sixth songs of the album are titled "Sahana" and "Sahara" — one being an upbeat rendition and the other being a soulful rendition of the same number. Singing the upbeat rendition is singer Udit Narayan with Chinmayi while the soulful rendition singers are Vijay Yesudas and Gomathishree. Both songs have lyrics written by Vairamuthu, who was praised by Rajinikanth personally for his effort.

The final song in the album is a situational theme song entitled "The Boss", sung by Blaaze, Naresh Iyer and Raqueeb Alam, with lyrics from Na. Muthukumar and Blaaze. Rahman worked with the Czech Philharmonic Orchestra and choral singers in Prague for the score.

== Release and reception ==
Three of the seven tracks were leaked online prior to the official release of the soundtrack. These were "Vaaji Vaaji," "Orukudai Sunlight," and "Sahaan Saaral." However, despite the uproar these songs caused, they were dismissed as scratchings for the picturization. Later the tracks were officially released with Chinmayi instead of Sujatha recording the song in Sahana and Suresh Peters added to the group of singers in Style (Oru Koodai Sunlight).

The official audio of Sivaji was released on 2 April 2007. Unlike other major films, no pooja was held for the event and the album hit the stands straight away. The original audio cassette cover had an image of four Rajinikanths on its cover, while the CD version had an image of the lead pair on its cover.

The album saw the biggest response to an Indian soundtrack since the Rajiv Menon multistarrer, Kandukondain Kandukondain, which also had music by A. R. Rahman. There was a pre-order of about 105,000 CDs and 90,000 cassettes before the release in Tamil Nadu, India. Repeat orders were received even by the close of the first day and many retail outlets reported stock outs. By the end of 4 April, the total CD sales had increased to about 140,000 and cassettes had reached 108,000 sales. On the overseas front, the sales of CDs in Malaysia and Singapore reportedly set new records for Tamil films in terms of the number of tracks sold.

Within the first three days of the release of the Sivaji audio, over 150,000 phone treats (ringtones, truetones and wallpapers) had been downloaded. Over ₹5,000,000 ($120,923) was made from this. In the ringtone department, 200,000 ring tones had been downloaded as of 13 April 2007. Ringtones of the song "Athiradee" were the most popular, followed by "Vaaji Vaaji" and "Style" finishing a close third.

The soundtrack of the film's Hindi version was released on 8 January 2010, through Sony Music label and was unveiled by K. Ravichandran, distributor for the Hindi version. Unlike the original film, the version uses different set of singers. Lyrics for the songs written by Nitin Raikwar, Iqpal Pathni, and singer Raqeeb Aalam.

== Track listing ==
=== Tamil ===
| No. | Title | Lyrics | Singer(s) | Length |
|---|---|---|---|---|
| 1. | "Balleilakka" | Na. Muthukumar | S. P. Balasubrahmanyam, A. R. Reihana, Benny Dayal | 6:11 |
| 2. | "Style" | Pa. Vijay, Blaaze | Blaaze, Tanvi Shah, Ravi "Rags" Khote, Suresh Peters | 5:16 |
| 3. | "Vaaji Vaaji" | Vairamuthu | Hariharan, Madhushree | 5:41 |
| 4. | "Athiradee" | Vaali | A. R. Rahman, Sayanora Philip Backing vocal: Naresh Iyer, Karthik | 5:50 |
| 5. | "Sahana" | Vairamuthu | Udit Narayan, Chinmayi, A. R. Rahman | 5:24 |
| 6. | "The Boss" | Na. Muthukumar, Blaaze | Naresh Iyer, Blaaze, Raqeeb Alam | 3:23 |
| 7. | "Sahara Pookal" | Vairamuthu | Vijay Yesudas, Gomathishree | 4:35 |
| Total length: | | | | 36:31 |

=== Telugu ===
| No. | Title | Lyrics | Singer(s) | Length |
|---|---|---|---|---|
| 1. | "Balleilakka" | Bhuvanachandra | S. P. Balasubrahmanyam, A. R. Reihana, Benny Dayal | 6:06 |
| 2. | "Style" | Kulasekhar | Blaaze, Tanvi Shah, Ravi "Rags" Khote, Suresh Peters | 5:09 |
| 3. | "Vaaji Vaaji" | Suddala Ashok Teja | Hariharan, Madhushree | 5:46 |
| 4. | "Adharanee" | Kulasekhar | A. R. Rahman, Sayanora Philip | 5:44 |
| 5. | "Sahana" | Bhuvanachandra | Udit Narayan, Chinmayi, A.R. Rahman | 5:18 |
| 6. | "The Boss" | Suddala Ashok Teja | Naresh Iyer, Blaaze, Raqeeb Alam | 3:18 |
| 7. | "Sahara" | Bhuvanachandra | Vijay Yesudas, Gomathishree | 4:30 |
| Total length: | | | | 35:51 |

=== Hindi ===
| No. | Title | Lyrics | Singer(s) | Length |
|---|---|---|---|---|
| 1. | "Suraj Hai Chanda Hai (Balleilakka)" | P. K. Mishra | Javed Ali, A. R. Reihana, Benny Dayal | 6:11 |
| 2. | "Style" | Nitin Raikwar, Tanvi Shah, Blaaze | Blaaze, Tanvi Shah, Ravi "Rags" Khote, Suresh Peters | 5:16 |
| 3. | "Wahji Wahji" | P. K. Mishra | Hariharan, Madhushree | 5:41 |
| 4. | "Suhana Sama (Sahana)" | Iqbal Pathni | Udit Narayan, Chinmayi, A. R. Rahman | 5:24 |
| 5. | "Aandhi Ki Tarah (Athiradee)" | Raqeeb Alam | A. R. Rahman, Sayanora Philip | 5:50 |
| 6. | "The Boss" | Raqeeb Alam | Naresh Iyer, Blaaze, Raqeeb Alam | 3:23 |
| 7. | "Suhana Sama - Version 2 (Sahara)" | Iqbal Pathni | Udit Narayan, Chinmayi | 4:35 |
| Total length: | | | | 36:31 |

== Background score ==
A. R. Rahman re-recorded the background music in London. Previously some re-recording of the score happened in Paraguay.
