= Pentagram (Indian band) =

Indian rock/electronica band

- Origin: India
- Genres: Electronic rock
- Years active: 1994–present
- Labels: Plus Music; Pentagram Music; Sony Music; Counter Culture Records
- Members: Vishal; Shiraz; Randolph; Makarand Mane (Papal)

Pentagram is a four-piece Indian rock/electronica band started in 1994 in Mumbai.

Pentagram is fronted by Vishal Dadlani (one half of the film music producing duo Vishal–Shekhar) with Randolph Correia on guitars, Clyde D'souza on guitars, Papal Mane on bass and Shiraz Bhattacharya on drums. All of whom have recently been actively involved in the Bollywood music business.

== History ==
=== Formation (1993–1995) ===
Pentagram started off in 1995, when Dadlani met drummer Shiraz Bhattacharya in a one show band called Nostalgia where Dadlani played the bass and handled vocal duties and Shekhar Ravjiani played keyboards. They decided to form their own band and roped in Clyde D’Souza as guitarist. Randolph Correia joined in on the guitars the following year and Papal Mane joined in as bassist while Dadlani focussed on Vocals. Pentagram received their initial recognition and fame by winning three major rock competitions at IIT Kanpur, IIT Delhi and IIT Bombay. Of these, Livewire, the annual band competition at Mood Indigo landed them a record deal. While the group started off as a rock/alt-rock band, they slowly drifted towards electronica and industrial sounds. Live performances in the latter quarter of their career have witnessed cover renditions of Seal, The Prodigy, Depeche Mode, etc.

=== We Are Not Listening (1996–2001) ===
This record deal with Plus Music led to the release of their debut album We Are Not Listening in 1996. To support their debut, the band released two videos (The Ignorant 1 and Yoo) which were frequently played on music channels, but failed to generate substantial sales. Pentagram won MTV India's Artist of the Month award in 1997 and also won the Channel V awards for Best Live Band and Best Indian Band in 1997 and 1998. They were featured on Channel V's Big Gig show, an hour-long live performance, which was plagued with bad sound. During the Kargil war, Pentagram recorded and released India's first exclusive-to-internet song, "The Price of Bullets", which featured famous poet Javed Akhtar and popular Indian classical artist Shankar Mahadevan. As a minor publicity stunt that failed, the video, directed by Farhan Akhtar, was blacked out by channels across the board for being "too politically loaded". It was then added as a bonus track on their second album Up.

=== Up (2002–2006) ===
The second album, Up (2002) saw the band's sound evolve into deliberate, definitive electro rock. The album went on to sell only 15,000 copies. Clyde D’Souza quit that year and Randolph Correia took on guitars and groove box. Dadlani found fame as a Bollywood music composer, singer and lyricist with movies like Jhankaar Beats, Bluffmaster! and Salaam Namaste. Pentagram have had a brief touring history outside India; including the Sundance Music Festival in Estonia in 2003. In 2005, Pentagram became the first Indian band to play at the Glastonbury Music Festival in the UK.

=== It’s OK, It’s All Good (2007–2010) ===
Pentagram released their third album It’s OK, It’s All Good in 2007 on their own record label, Pentagram Music. The first single off this album "Voice" won the Song Of The Year and vocalist Vishal was awarded Vocalist Of The Year at the Jack Daniel's Annual Indian Rock Awards. "Voice" also received considerable airplay on VH1 India. The song was later used in a music video competition by the channel and Nokia, and the video that has been released features the contributions of various fans across India who sent in their videos. Guitarist Correia set up his other band, Shaa'ir and Func in 2007 with New York-born singer Monica Dogra.

=== Bloodywood (2011–2013) ===
The band released their latest studio album in March 2011. It was named Bloodywood, representing the anti-thesis to the mainstream. The band also performed at Sympulse, the annual cultural festival of Symbiosis Centre for Management Studies, Pune. In the same year, episodes of Penta TV which featured behind-the-scenes videos of the band's shows and tours were added to their site. In 2013, they recorded the song Be a Hero, the Star Movies Action theme for Star Movies Action.

== Band members ==
Current members

- Vishal Dadlani – vocals (1993–present)
- Papal Mane – bass (1994–present)
- Randolph Correia – guitar (1993–present)
- Shiraz Bhattacharya – drums (1993–present)

Former members

- Clyde D’Souza – guitar (1993–2002)

== Discography ==
- We're Not Listening (1996 Plus Music)
- Up (2002 Pentagram Music, Sony Music)
- It's OK, It's All Good (2007 Pentagram Music)
- Bloodywood (2011, Pentagram Music)
- There (2019, Pentagram Music)
