= Vizhiyil Vizhunthaval =

- Directed by: Ajaz
- Written by: Ajaz
- Produced by: Iynul Ayman Athiya
- Starring: Ajaz; Shilpa; Anaka
- Cinematography: Biju Antony
- Edited by: Ajaz
- Music by: Pollack
- Production company: G-Ants Productions
- Release date: 23 July 2010
- Running time: 140 minutes
- Country: India
- Language: Tamil

Vizhiyil Vizhunthaval (transl. She fell into the eye) is a 2010 Tamil language romance film directed by Ajaz. The film stars newcomers Ajaz, Shilpa and Anaka, with Madhu, Anbu, Narayanan, Pavina, Amutha Ganeshan, and Gopi playing supporting roles. It was released on 23 July 2010.

== Plot ==
Vinoth (Ajaz) is a young wealthy businessman and the owner of a company which had launched many innovative inventions. He falls in love at first sight with Mridula (Shilpa), who is from Australia, and appoints her as his new personal secretary. Vinoth tries to impress Mridula in many ways, but she is repulsed by his eccentric behavior and rejects his love proposal. A desperate Vinoth decides to make Mridula jealous, so he tries to seduce his new secretary Anitha (Anaka), who unexpectedly falls in love with him. Thereafter, Mridula is abducted by a psychopath. Vinoth and Anitha try to save her, They face many obstacles but successfully overcome them. They finally find Mridula in a deserted factory. Her abductor was waiting for Vinoth and tried to kill him. In the process, Anitha is shot dead by the psychopath, and Vinoth kills him in return. The psychopath was in fact paid by other company owners to kill Vinoth because they were jealous of his growth and success. Many years later, Vinoth and Mridula are a happily married couple and have two children.

== Cast ==
- Ajaz as Vinoth
- Shilpa as Mridula
- Anaka as Anitha
- Madhu as Rajesh
- Anbu as Suresh
- Pavina as Anjali
- Narayanan
- Amutha Ganeshan
- Gopi

== Production ==
Ajaz, who studied in London and performed staged plays there, is foraying into acting through this film. He worked as an associate director at an art academy in America that helped him nurture his direction and acting. Shilpa from Kerala and stage actress Anaka were cast as the heroines. Ajaz said, "Being in the software industry and having been associated with a lot of back-end work for films, we have the right expertise, knowledge and infrastructure needed to produce hi-tech films. Vizhiyil Vizhunthaval was quite graphic intensive (all the sets were created using graphics). We'll see how viewers accept Vizhiyil Vizhunthaval before deciding on our next production". For the titular song, which featured Ajaz and Shilpa appeared in 56 costumes.

== Soundtrack ==
Vizhiyil Vizhunthaval

Soundtrack album by Pollack
- Released: 12 October 2009
- Recorded: 2009
- Genre: Feature film soundtrack
- Length: 24:44
- Producer: Pollack

The film score and the soundtrack were composed by Pollack. The soundtrack features 7 tracks.

All tracks are written by R. K. Raghuraman.

Tracklist
No.	Title	Singer(s)	Length
1.	"Paarthal Naan Charlie Chaplin"	Benny Dayal	04:04
2.	"Vizhigalil Vizhunthaval"	Suchith Suresan	02:46
3.	"Oru Naal Mazhainaal"	Suchith Suresan, Niveda, Sreelaxmi	03:57
4.	"Penne Nee"	Suchith Suresan	03:39
5.	"Sirakindri Paravi"	Anuradha Sriram	04:30
6.	"Thenkoodu"	Krithika	03:39
7.	"Theendi Paaradha"	Shweta Mohan	02:09
Total length:			24:44
