= Krissy =

Krissy is a given name. Notable people with the name include:

- Krissy Badé (born 1980), French basketball player
- Krissy Chin (born 1980), professional figure competitor from the United States
- Krissy & Ericka, Philippine pop-acoustic music duo
- Krissy Kneen, Brisbane-based bookseller and writer
- Krissy (Kris Aquino) (born 1971), Filipino talk show host, actress, etc.
- Krissy Krissy (born 1988), pop singer based in Brooklyn, New York
- Lady Kash and Krissy, Singaporean Indian rapper-singer duo, formed Sept 2008
- Krissy Matthews (born 1992), British-Norwegian blues rock singer-songwriter and guitarist
- Krissy Moehl (born 1977), American ultramarathon athlete, specializes in trail running
- Krissy Nordhoff (born 1974), American musician, plays a pop style of Christian worship music
- Krissy Taylor (1978–1995), American model
- Krissy Vaine (born 1981), American model, retired professional wrestler and valet
- Krissy Wendell-Pohl (born 1981), American women's ice hockey player

== See also ==
- Kris
- Kriss (disambiguation)
- Krisspy
