= Ravi Khote =

- Born: Ravi Khote
- Genres: Playback singing
- Occupation: Singer

Ravi "Rags" Khote is a playback singer for films in India, he is known for his raps between stanzas. Some of his songs include "Style" from Sivaji: The Boss, "Rabba Rabba" from Allah Ke Banday, and "Pretty Woman" from Kal Ho Naa Ho.
