= Krissy Krissy =

American singer (born 1988)

- Also known as: Krissy Krissy
- Born: Krislyn Rivera; September 24, 1988 (age 37)
- Origin: Bushwick, New York, U.S.
- Genres: Pop
- Occupations: Singer, songwriter
- Instruments: Vocals, guitar
- Years active: 2011–present
- Label: Bigger Than Buildings

Krissy Krissy, styled KRISSY KRISSY (born Krislyn Rivera, September 24, 1988) is a pop singer based in Brooklyn, New York. She is known for her 2012 single "Dream", which received airplay on MTV, MTVu, MTV.com, and VEVO.

She released her debut album Above All on September 25, 2012.

== Childhood ==
Krislyn Rivera was born on September 24, 1988 in California. She was raised in Bushwick, Brooklyn and started singing as child.

== Career ==
In 2011, she signed as Krissy Krissy with Dennis Wynn, at Bigger Than Buildings Management, who also manages Slaughterhouse rapper Joell Ortiz. Her debut album Above All was released September 25, 2012.

=== "Dream" ===
Her first single, "Dream," debuted at the top of Clear Channel's I Heart Radio platform June 2012. That month, Funkmaster Flex on his website told his fans to check her out, and the song won MTVu's Freshman Pick of the Week on MTV.com. The single was released on iTunes August 16, 2012.

Its video, produced by a local Brooklyn company, RRaW Films, was added to the video rotation of MTVu stores in July 2012. "Dream" was also added to the video rotation on MTV the same month. Formally released August 2012, it also appeared on VEVO's homage, which noted "the Brooklyn newcomer grew up singing in the church but her music sounds great anywhere." In November of that year, All Hip Hop magazine featured Krissy

=== Critical reception ===
The Huffington Post's Jon Chattman wrote, "Krissy Krissy has a distinct voice that stands out in a crowd, and by crowd, I mean a music industry with a bunch of pretenders and clones."MTV Buzzworthy wrote "“Tracks like “Broken Glass” showcase Krissy’s sultry vocals (we’re feeling some Mary J. Blige soul vibes mixed with some Natasha Bedingfield flair and even a little Mary Mary gospel realness)". The website Vashtie has described her as "a rising star"

== Discography ==
=== Albums ===
- Above All (2012)

=== Extended plays ===
- "Dream" (2012)

=== Singles ===
- "Dream" (2012)
