= Tanvi =

Tanvi (Sanskrit: तन्वी, romanized: Tanvī) is a feminine given name which means "slender-bodied maiden" in Sanskrit. It is an epithet of the Hindu goddess Durga. Notable people with the name include:

- Tanvi Azmi (born 1960), Indian actress
- Tanvi Bhatia (born 1989), Indian actress
- Tanvi Ganesh Lonkar (born 1995), Indian actress
- Tanvi Shah (born 1982), Indian singer
- Tanvi Thakkar (born 1985), Indian actress
- Tanvi Vyas (born 1985), Indian actress
- Tanvi Sharma (born 2008), Indian tennis player
- Tanvi Patri (born 2011), Indian tennis player
