= Sympulse =

- Genre: Student Run Cultural Fest
- Locations: Pune, India
- Founded: 2010
- Sponsor: Symbiosis Centre for Management Studies (UG)
- Website: www.sympulsefest.com

Sympulse is an annual international college cultural festival at Symbiosis Centre for Management Studies (SCMS) Pune, founded in 2010. It spreads across a span of five days held in the first quarter of every year. It attracts students from junior, under-graduate and post-graduate colleges as participants. It is an exposure into different categories of talent, for example: Business and Management, Model United Nation Conference, Showcasing artistic ability in cultural extravaganzas, and Sports. These categories have been personalized to suit the fest and the events take place simultaneously over those five days.

Each year has a new theme. Previous themes have been: City Beats, Medieval Mayhem, Theatre of Transition, Spirit of Celebration, Element Entourage, Escape to Neverland, Chrono Drift, Local Coalesce, Elemental Entourage, and Cinematic Odyssey. The Theme for 2020 was Cultural Medley. The 2021 and 2026 editions also attracted huge response.

== Symbiosis Centre for Management Studies, Pune ==
Symbiosis Centre for Management Studies – a constituent unit of Symbiosis International University was formerly introduced as Symbiosis BBA on 12 July 2004 in Pune. The institute is ranked among the top BBA courses in the nation under the guidance of Dr. Bhama Venkataramani. About 6000 students apply for 240 seats annually.

== The 5 wings of Sympulse ==
In 2010, SCMS-UG held four separate college fests with different objectives: Ananya, Sprint, SIMUNC and Symulate. Ananya was focused on cultural activities, Sprint was focused on sport-related activities, SIMUNC was focused on global topics and Symulate was focused on business-related activities. In 2010 the student council decided to merge them and create a single, larger fest called Sympulse. These four fests became wings of Sympulse, and their events were held simultaneously across the five days. Over time, Sympulse grew into five distinct wings (Ananya, Symulate, Sprint, Headline Events, and SIMUNC).

=== Ananya ===
Ananya is the cultural wing which encourages creativity and artistic expression through the events it hosts. It's also the largest cultural fest in Pune. It is known to be the living embodiment of a fun element of Sympulse because it plays host to various cultural art forms and ideas. The list of categories it covers is given below:

- Literary arts
- Fine arts
- Performing arts
- Showcase events
- Gaming
- Workshops
- Informals
- On the spot events

The events held within each category are not standardized, therefore each year the committee has new events to suit the theme of Sympulse along with previously successful events.

=== Headline Events ===
Headline Events is the glamour wing of Sympulse. It is often compared to the gilded world of movies and music, as it showcases the best elements of its participants. They host events like:

- Pit stop: A show case of international cars and bikes from all over Maharashtra. These automobiles are showcased in the college campus.
- Battle of the bands (BOTB): BOTB showcase nationally renowned bands like demonic resurrection, family cheese and workshop.
- War of the DJ: The participant DJs play what they have to offer, competing with each other and the crowd enjoys and judges the best mixes.
- Pronite: A celebration the Indian cinema and music.
- Texas Hold’em: Where poker is played like a sport.

=== SIMUNC ===
SIMUNC, the Symbiosis International Model United Nation Conference, is a personalized version of Model United Nations. SIMUNC compels students to act responsibly, think critically, and make wise decisions It is, in essence, a simulation of the UN and its committees, with contemporary, historical, and, frequently, futuristic perspectives. Students are given an opportunity to converge from all over the world in a dynamic environment to deliberate on global issues, acting as delegates representing the various member states of the UN.

=== Sprint ===
Sprint is the sport wing of Sympulse. It was one of the four initial wings of Sympulse, and generally has the highest participation of all wings. The events are categorized into the following sports:

- Basketball
- Football
- Street football
- Boxing
- Badminton
- Table tennis
- And a lot more

=== Symulate ===
Symulate is the business and management wing of Sympulse. Symulate begins with the ‘academic summit’, where eminent personalities from different sectors like corporate, sports, media and politics come together to enlighten students on a pre-decided topic. This is followed by events which test the participants' knowledge with management and other business-related activities. It gives participants a common platform to compete and showcase their talents in events ranging from Finance and Human Resource to a variety of team events. It accommodates participants from various colleges for a span of five days where every college contingent battles for the top spot. The events held by Symulate are:

- Best Manager
- Finance
- Best Entrepreneur
- Marketing
- Human Resources
- Business Plan
- Business Quiz
- Strategy

== Through the years ==
=== Sympulse'10 ===
This was the first year when Sympulse was held. The theme was City Beats. The 4 initial wings of Sympulse – Ananya, Sprint, SIMUNC, and Symulate – embraced the theme and created events within each category to suit the theme. With City Beats as its theme, it aimed to celebrate the epitome of human civilization, the manifestation of man's very soul, and the pinnacle of ambitious vision: a City. There were 30 international participants and 800 international participants; hence a total of 830 participants. The media coverage was by Channel V and Pune Mirror. The total value of the fest was 4,000,000 INR. The footfall for the year was approximately 22,000 guests.

==== Celebrities Sympulse'10 ====
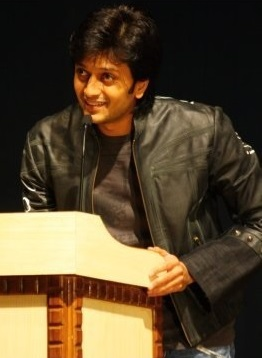
Riteish Deshmukh at Sympulse '10

- Abraxas
- Amey Date
- Hemant Kaul
- Hormuz Ragina
- Neeta Lulla
- Poppy Jabal
- Praniti Shinde
- Pullela Gopichand
- Ritesh Deshmukh
- Tarla Dalal
- VJ Andy of Channel V.

=== Sympulse'11 ===
In 2011, Sympulse was held from 17 to 21 January. This year there was an addition of the fifth wing: Headlines. The theme for this year was Medius Tempus Insania also known as Medieval Mayhem. The fest had 44 events spread out across the span of five days. There were 54 international participants, 1232 national participants; hence, 1276 participants in total. The media coverage was done by MTV, Pune Mirror, and Mid-Day. The value of the fest was 4,800,000 INR. The festival recorded an approximate footfall of 24,000 people during the five days. In addition to the Sympulse buzz, there was a movie shot on campus during the fest. However, the highlight was the performance by Shankar Mahadevan and his troupe – that saw an audience of approximately 2000 people.

==== Celebrities Sympulse'11 ====
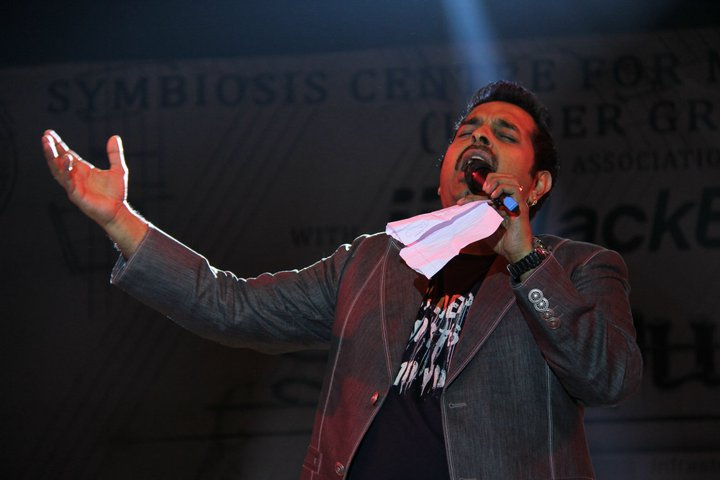
Shankar Mahadevan at Sympulse '11

- Angad Bedi
- Arjun Bajwa
- Ashley Lobo
- Shankar Mahadevan
- Jacky Bhagnani
- Kailash Kher
- Puja Gupta
- Remo D’souza
- Tochi Raina
- Vashu Bhagnani
- Wendell Rodricks
- Salman Khan

=== Sympulse'12 ===
In 2012, Sympulse was held on 30 – 3 February. This was the third year of the fest. The theme was Theatre of Transition, it was inspired by the changes in society. It was symbolic of developments in ideologies of people and how that brought about transitions in the lives of individuals which then contributed to the revolution of society over the past few decades. There were 60 international participants and 2200 domestic participants; hence in total 2260 participants. The media coverage was done by Gulf News, Mid-Day, and Pune Mirror. The total value of the fest was 7,480,640 INR. Sympulse’12 recorded a footfall of 28,274. Some of the major attractions of the festival this year were the Pit Stop bikes and cars, the Battle of the Bands, the Fashion Show, and the Musical Nite concert by Pentagram.

==== Celebrities Sympulse'12 ====
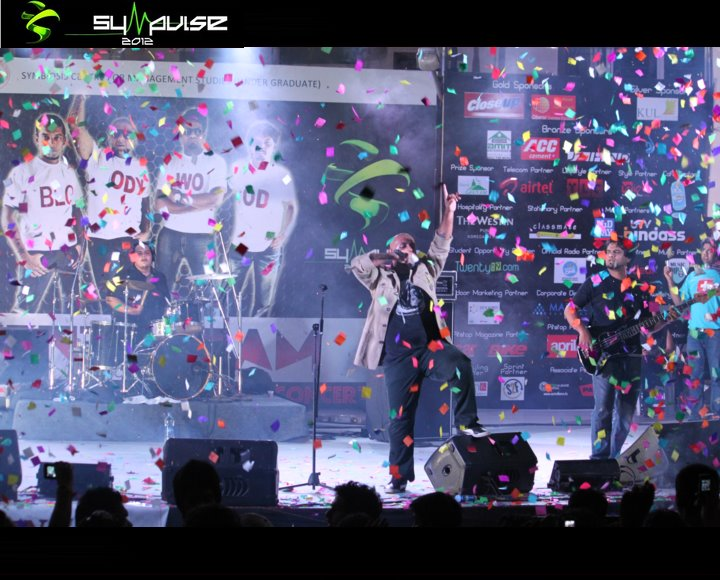
Pentagram at Sympulse '12

- Band of Boys
- Javed Jaffrey
- Kailash Kher
- Madhur Bhandarkar
- Manoviraj Khosla
- Mugdha Godse
- Nargis Fakhri
- Nikhil Chinnappa
- Ranbir Kapoor
- Shriya Saran

=== Sympulse'13 ===
In its fourth year, 2013, Sympulse was held from 28 January – 1 February. The theme for the year was The Spirit of Celebration. It intended to celebrate all aspects of life. There were 72 international participants and 3000 domestic participants; hence 3072 participants in total. The Media coverage was by 9XO/9XM, Mid-Day, Radio One, DSN, and Extentia. The total value of the fest was 11,300,000 INR. The approximate footfall of the fest was 35,000. The highlight of the fest was the Musical Nite with Michael Woods and the ProNite with RDB and Akshay Kumar.

==== Celebrities Sympulse'13 ====
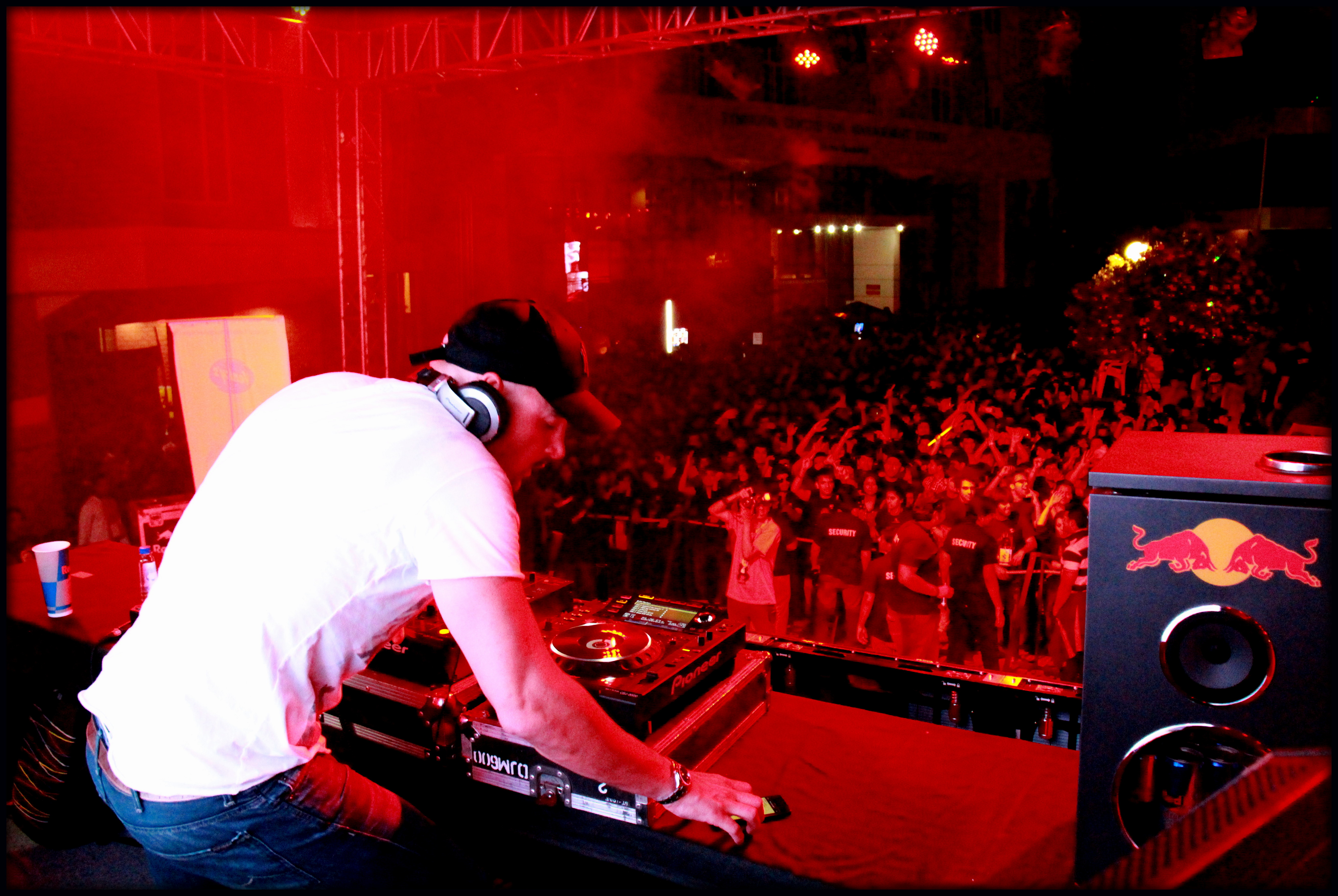
Michael Woods at Sympulse '13

- Akshay Kumar
- Kajal Aggarwal
- Dualist Inquiry
- Master Marzi
- Michael Woods
- RDB
- Shivamani
- Terence Lewis

=== Sympulse'14 ===
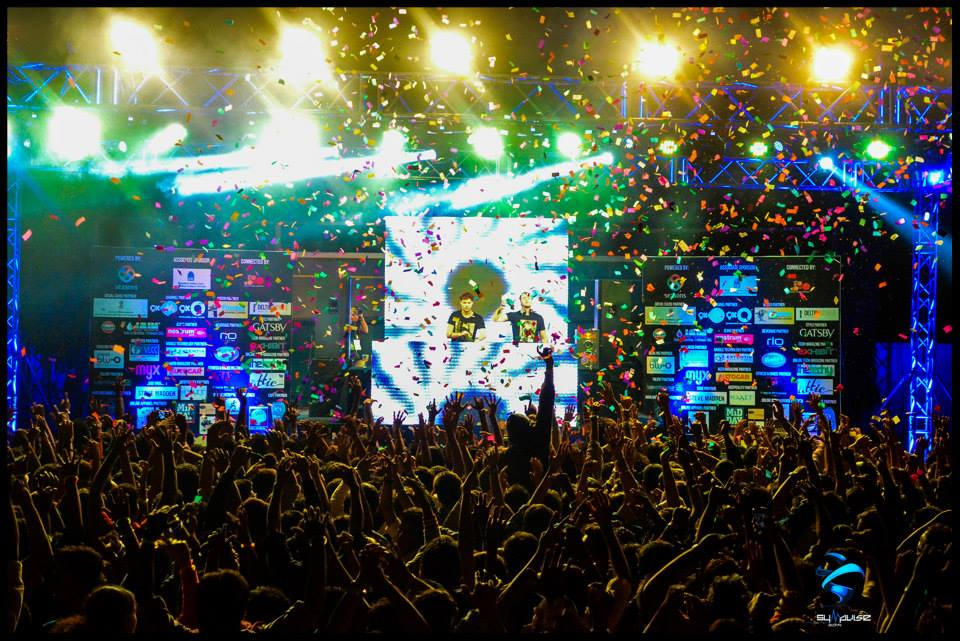
Dub vision at Musical Nite - Sympulse '14

In its fifth year, Sympulse was held 28 January – 1 February 2014. "Escape to Neverland" was the theme of the fifth edition. The Media coverage was done by 9XM/9XO, Radio One, Extentia, Autocar India, Mid Day, and Sakal times. The total value of the fest was Rs. 120 lakh with the approximate footfall of the fest being 40,000. The highlight of the fest was the Musical Nite with Dubvision and Nikhil Chinnappa, and the ProNite with Benny Dayal and Bombay Rockers.

==== Celebrity quotient ====
- Randeep Hooda,
- Benny Dayal,
- Tom Alter,
- Dubvision,
- Nikhil Chinnappa
- Bombay Rockers

=== Sympulse'15 ===
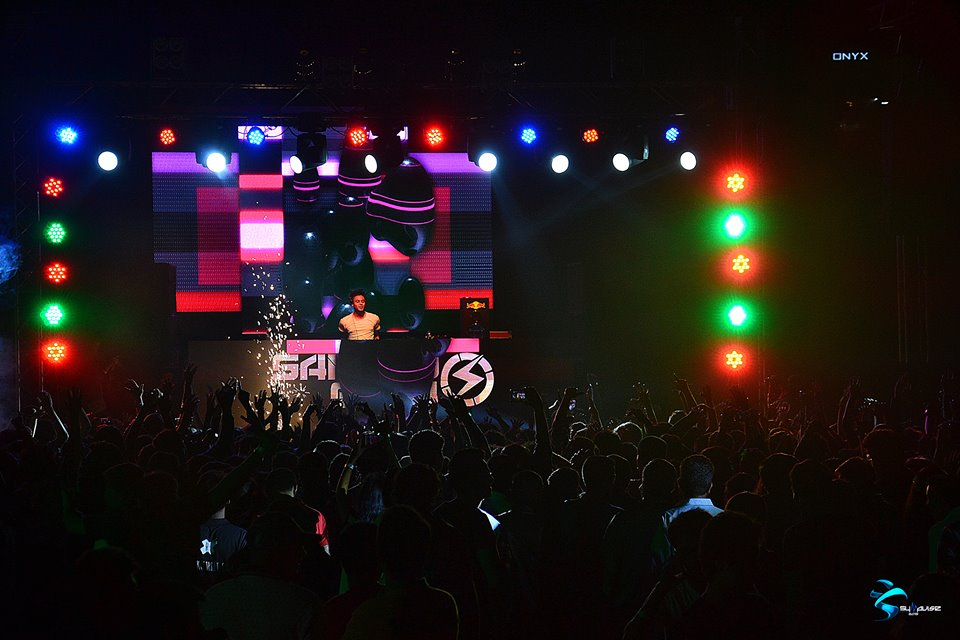
Musical Night at Sympulse '15

2015 witnessed Sympulse ’15 from 28 January – 1 February. Entering into its sixth year Sympulse took up "Chrono Drift" as the theme as it found inspiration from the changing tides of time. It was symbolic of the perpetual changes in the society and the ideologies of people and how that brought about transitions in the lives of individuals over time. There were 650 international participants and 4200 domestic participants; hence in total 4850 participants. The media coverage was done by VH1, Radio Mirchi, and Pune Mirror. The total value of the fest was Rs. 40 lakh. Sympulse ’15 had a record footfall of 45,000.

==== Celebrity Quotient ====
- Vijendra Singh: Boxing (Sprint)
- Mithoon: Western solo (Ananya).
- Ashmeet Patel: Drama event (Ananya)
- Purab Kholi, Amyara Dastur and Arya Babbar: Fashion show (Ananya)
- Shakti Mohon (Dancer): Solo Dance (Ananya)
- Indian Ocean

=== Sympulse’16 ===
Sympulse’16 was conducted from 20 to 24 January. The theme of this edition was ‘Realm: The Rebirth,’. The five day event included events from a wide variety of domains, including literature, business, sports, music, stage performance and more.

=== Sympulse’17 ===
The 2017 edition of Sympulse was held from 18 to 22 January with the theme ‘Local Coalescence’. The theme represents the melding together of different cultures in India to create one beautiful, local community. The 5 day long festival included a wide variety of events such as street plays, concerts and competitions.

=== Sympulse’18 ===
Sympulse’18 was conducted from 17 to 22 January and the theme was ‘An Elemental Entourage.’ The five day event consisted of various events such as business competitions, performing arts exhibitions, sports and much more related to the 5 elements; fire, water, earth, air and cosmos. The event featured fashion shows, musical performances, and food stalls.

=== Sympulse'19 ===
Sympulse’19 took place from 15 to 18 January 2020. The theme this year was Cinematic Odyssey, and events were based on movies and TV Shows.

==== Celebrity Quotient ====
- Kiran Bedi
- Biswa Kalyan Rath
- Kaneez Surka
- Varun Thakur
- Gurbaxx
- The Yellow Diary
- aswekeepsearching
- Ayesha Takia
- Suresh Menon
- Parul Gulati
- Su real

=== Sympulse’20 ===
In 2020, Sympulse was held from 15 to 28 January, and the theme was ‘Cultural Medley.’ The theme was representative of Sympulse’s encouragement of inclusivity and diversity. The festival consisted of a wide array of events such as photography competitions, treasure hunts, sports competitions, mono-acting, street dances and more.

=== Sympulse’21 ===
Sympulse’21 was held from 14 to 17 May, and was the first edition of Sympulse to take place virtually. Audience members and participants tuned in virtually through virtual conferences and live streams. The theme for Sympulse’21 was ‘A Global Canvas’. Events included business competitions, games of taboo, graphic design contests, physical strength competitions and much more.

=== Sponsors ===
- Shirke Group
- Dainik Jagran News
- Havenspire
- Imperial Overseas Educational Consultants
- Pokerstars
- Suhana
- The Great Punjab
- High Tournaments
- Manikchand
- Cocoa Melts
- Paytm Insider
- StuCred
- Amplogic Audio
- Abhishek Mantri
- Micro-Star International
- Baked For You
- Barrel Beans
- Body First Wellness
- Brew House Tea
- Campus Times Pune
- DU Express
- The Funky Bunny
- Kaploths

=== Celebrity Quotient ===
- Aishwarya Mohanraj
- Aakash Gupta
- Mostly Sane (Prajakta Koli)
- Sakshi Malik
- Sandeep Singh
- Neville Shah
- Rohan Shah
- Shruti Pathak
- Venkat Subramaniyam
- Anupria Goenka
- Kunal More
- Prince Nagpal
- Kakoli Gaur
- Abhishek Mantri
- Siana Catherine
- Sandeep Singh
- Maadhyam (Mayank Maurya)
- Atit Mehta
- Lovely Sharma
- Pankaj Prajapati
- Muhfaad
- Anushka Sharma
- Sunadda Damrongmanee
- Ishan Khedkar
- Aneesha Dalal
- Shreya Mehta
- Medha Srivastava

== Management ==
Sympulse is an entirely student-run college festival. There are 18 departments which co-ordinate and manage the fest by sharing responsibility of operations. The objectives are monitored by one or two Heads of Department (HOD). The HODs report to a seven-person executive team, which in turn reports to the Vice President and President of Sympulse. The President is then liable to keep the Faculty in-charge updated and well informed. The entire organizing committee consists of approximately 400 people.

=== Departments of Sympulse ===
Ananya	Headline Events	Sponsorship
Compliance	Procurement	Sprint
Creatives	Press	Symulate
Domestic & International Relations	SIMUNC	Technicals
Finance	Social Media and Graphics	
Guest Relations	Security	
Hospi		
